= The Boss Baby (franchise) =

DreamWorks Animation media franchise

- Official franchise logo
- Created by: Marla Frazee
- Original work: The Boss Baby (2017)
- Owners: DreamWorks Animation (Universal Pictures (Note: 20th Century Fox distributed the first film as part of DreamWorks' distribution deal with the studio. Then the distribution rights to Boss Baby movies moved to Universal Studios following the acquisition; the first distributed by the studio was The Boss Baby: Family Business (2021).))
- Years: 2017-present
- Based on: The Boss Baby (2010)

Films and television
- Film(s): The Boss Baby (2017); The Boss Baby: Family Business (2021)
- Short film(s): Treasure Hunt Through Time (2017); Precious Templeton: A Pony Tale (2021)
- Animated series: Back in Business (2018–2020); Back in the Crib (2022–2023)
- Television special(s): Get That Baby! (2020); Christmas Bonus (2022)

Audio
- Soundtrack(s): The Boss Baby; Family Business

The Boss Baby is a media franchise made by DreamWorks Animation, loosely based on the 2010 picture book of the same name by Marla Frazee. The franchise began with the 2017 film The Boss Baby and was followed by a 2021 sequel, Family Business; two television series, Back in Business (2018–2020) and Back in the Crib (2022–2023); two short films; and a 2020 interactive special, with a third film in development.

The franchise revolves around the Templeton family, particularly Tim and his younger adopted brother Ted, the latter of whom is an intelligent, talking baby who works for Baby Corp, a top-secret organization that creates the worlds' babies and helps get them to their proper families.

== Films ==
Film	U.S. release date	Director	Screenplay by	Story by	Producer
The Boss Baby	March 31, 2017	Tom McGrath	Michael McCullers	Michael McCullers	Ramsey Ann Naito
The Boss Baby: Family Business	July 2, 2021	Tom McGrath	Michael McCullers	Tom McGrath and Michael McCullers	Jeff Hermann

=== The Boss Baby (2017) ===
The Boss Baby is a 2017 American animated comedy film produced by DreamWorks Animation and distributed by 20th Century Fox, following a 7-year-old boy named Tim helping his baby brother who is a secret agent in the war for adults' love between babies and puppies.

The film was scheduled for a March 18, 2016 release, but another DreamWorks Animation film, Kung Fu Panda 3, took over its date to avoid competition with Star Wars: The Force Awakens, moving the release date to March 31, 2017. The Boss Baby was released on Digital HD on July 4, 2017, and was released on DVD, Blu-ray, Blu-ray 3D and Ultra HD Blu-ray on July 25, 2017, by 20th Century Fox Home Entertainment. The film features the voices of Alec Baldwin as the title character, along with Miles Bakshi, Steve Buscemi, Jimmy Kimmel, Lisa Kudrow and Tobey Maguire.

=== The Boss Baby: Family Business (2021) ===
The Boss Baby: Family Business is a 2021 American sequel to the 2017 The Boss Baby film, again produced by DreamWorks Animation and distributed by Universal Pictures, following the estranged Templeton brothers being reunited by Tim's daughters, one of whom is a new agent from BabyCorp on a mission to uncover the dark secrets behind Tabitha's school and its mysterious founder, Dr. Armstrong.

On May 25, 2017, Universal Pictures and DreamWorks Animation announced that a sequel was set to be released on March 26, 2021, but was delayed to September 17, 2021, taking over the release date of The Bad Guys. The film was moved up to July 2, 2021, and will also stream on Peacock on the same day for free. On May 8, 2020, production was being done remotely during the COVID-19 pandemic. Along with a returning Alec Baldwin, Jimmy Kimmel and Lisa Kudrow, the film features the voices of James Marsden, Amy Sedaris, Ariana Greenblatt, Eva Longoria and Jeff Goldblum.

=== The Boss Baby 3 ===
In June 2021, during a Q&A with Alec Baldwin and Amy Sedaris, a third Boss Baby film was announced to be in early development.

== Short films ==
- The Boss Baby and Tim's Treasure Hunt Through Time (2017): A 2D and 3D animated short film released on July 25, 2017, on The Boss Baby Blu-ray and DVD pack, following Wizzie, the wizard from Tim's alarm clock, as he narrates Tim and Ted's (Boss Baby's) adventures in imagination.
- Precious Templeton: A Pony Tale (2021): a 2D animated short film released on September 14, 2021, on The Boss Baby: Family Business Blu-ray and DVD pack, following a bedtime story told to Tina and Tabitha about Precious, the pony Ted gave Tabitha as a lavish gift, who tries to win a carnival talent show from a rival horse, being narrated by Ted himself (reprised by Alec Baldwin).

== Television series ==
Series	Seasons	Episodes	First released	Last released	Showrunner(s)	Network(s)
The Boss Baby: Back in Business	4	49	April 6, 2018	November 17, 2020	Brandon Sawyer	Netflix
The Boss Baby: Back in the Crib	2	28	May 19, 2022	April 13, 2023	Brandon Sawyer	Netflix

=== The Boss Baby: Back in Business (2018–20) ===
An animated television series based on the first film, titled The Boss Baby: Back in Business, aired on Netflix between April 6, 2018 and March 16, 2020. A total of 37 episodes were released. The cast featured new voice actors for the characters of Boss Baby (J. P. Karliak), Tim (Pierce Gagnon), Ted Templeton Sr. (David W. Collins), Janice Templeton (Hope Levy), Jimbo (Kevin Michael Richardson), and Staci (Alex Cazares), while Eric Bell Jr. reprised his role as The Triplets from the film. This series was produced by DreamWorks Animation and distributed by NBCUniversal Television.

=== The Boss Baby: Back in the Crib (2022–23) ===
On March 10, 2022, DreamWorks announced a new series and a possible continuation of Back in Business based on the characters from The Boss Baby: Family Business. It was released on May 19, 2022 on Netflix, with JP Karliak (the only actor reprising from Back in Business) reprising his role as the titular character, Ariana Greenblatt (the only actor reprising from Family Business) reprising her role as Tabitha, Max Mittelman replaces Pierce Gagnon from the first series as Tim, and Mary Faber and Krizia Bajos replace Amy Sedaris and Eva Longoria from the second film as Tina and Carol respectively. A 2nd season of the show released on April 13, 2023.

== Television specials ==
=== The Boss Baby: Get That Baby! (2020) ===
The Boss Baby: Get That Baby!, an interactive special, was released on Netflix on September 1, 2020, featuring the cast of The Boss Baby: Back in Business television series.

=== The Boss Baby: Christmas Bonus (2022) ===
The Boss Baby: Christmas Bonus, a Christmas special, was released on Netflix on December 6, 2022, featuring the cast of both The Boss Baby: Back in Business and The Boss Baby: Back in the Crib television series.

== Cast and characters ==
List indicator
- A dark gray cell indicates the character was not featured in the film.
- A ^{Y} indicates an actor or actress voiced a younger version of their character.

Characters
Characters	Feature films		Short films		Television series		Television specials	
Characters	The Boss Baby (2017)	The Boss Baby: Family Business (2021)	The Boss Baby and Tim's Treasure Hunt Through Time (2017)	Precious Templeton: A Pony Tale (2021)	The Boss Baby: Back in Business (2018–20)	The Boss Baby: Back in the Crib (2022–2023)	The Boss Baby: Get That Baby! (2020)	The Boss Baby Christmas Bonus (2022)
Theodore "Ted" Templeton Jr. The Boss Baby	Alec Baldwin	Alec Baldwin	Alec Baldwin	Alec Baldwin	J. P. Karliak	J. P. Karliak	J. P. Karliak	J. P. Karliak
Timothy "Tim" Templeton	Tobey Maguire	James Marsden	Miles Bakshi	James Marsden	Pierce Gagnon	Max Mittelman	Pierce Gagnon	Max Mittelman
Timothy "Tim" Templeton	Miles Bakshi^{Y}	Miles Bakshi^{Y}	Miles Bakshi	James Marsden	Pierce Gagnon	Pierce Gagnon^{Y}	Pierce Gagnon	Pierce Gagnon^{Y}
Janice Templeton	Lisa Kudrow	Lisa Kudrow			Hope Levy		Hope Levy	Hope Levy
Theodore "Ted" Templeton Sr.	Jimmy Kimmel	Jimmy Kimmel			David W. Collins		David W. Collins	David W. Collins
Jimbo	David Soren	David Soren		David Soren	Kevin Michael Richardson	Kevin Michael Richardson	Kevin Michael Richardson	Kevin Michael Richardson
Staci	ViviAnn Yee	Character is silent			Alex Cazares	Alex Cazares	Alex Cazares	Alex Cazares
Triplets	Eric Bell Jr.	Nicholas Gist		Nicholas Gist	Eric Bell Jr.	Eric Bell Jr.		
Francis Francis Super Colossal Big Fat Boss Baby	Steve Buscemi							
Eugene Francis	Conrad Vernon							
The Big Boss Baby	Edie Mirman							
Wizzie	James McGrath	James McGrath	James McGrath					
Story Bear	James Ryan	James Ryan						
Tabitha Templeton	Nina Zoe Bakshi	Ariana Greenblatt		Ariana Greenblatt		Ariana Greenblatt Maya Tanida		Ariana Greenblatt
Tina Templeton The New Boss Baby	Character is silent	Amy Sedaris		Amy Sedaris		Mary Faber		Mary Faber
Carol Templeton		Eva Longoria				Krizia Bajos		
Dr. Erwin Armstrong		Jeff Goldblum						
Nathan Pickles		Raphael Alejandro						
Meghan Glick		Serenity Brown						
Dr. Tiffany Hamilton		Tom McGrath						
Lead Baby Ninja		Raphael Alejandro						
Mega Fat CEO / Mail Intern / Regular Baby					Flula Borg		Flula Borg	
Marisol Lopez-Lugo					Sarah-Nicole Robles		Sarah-Nicole Robles	
Magnus					David Lodge			
Danny Petroski					Justin Felbinger			Justin Felbinger
Baby Hendershot					Brandon Scott	Brandon Scott		Brandon Scott
Frankie					Aparna Nacherla	Aparna Nacherla		
R&D Baby Simmons					Kari Wahlgren	Mara Junot		Kari Wahlgren
Marsha Krinkle					Kari Wahlgren	Kari Wahlgren		
Buddy from HR					Kevin Michael Richardson	Kevin Michael Richardson		
Chip					JP Karliak	JP Karliak		
Bootsy Calico					Jake Green		Jake Green	
Wendi					Wendie Malick		Wendie Malick	
Stevefan					Tony Hale			
Gigi					Nora Dunn			
Frederic Estes					Victor Raider-Wexler		Victor Raider-Wexler	
Turtleneck Superstar					Cynthia Erivo			
Junior Fancy					Diedrich Bader			
Board Baby Emiliano					Carlos Ponce			
Bug the Pug					Dee Bradley Baker			
Hermano Menor					Eric Lopez			
Multi-Multi-Task CEO Baby					Cheri Oteri			
Gina and Tina Namashita					Audrey Huynh			
Dr. Kevin					Regi Davis			
Happy Sedengry					Rhys Darby		Rhys Darby	
Maria–Maria					Carla Tassara			
OCB					Aasif Mandvi			
JJ						Alex Cazares		
Pip						Karan Soni		
Dez						Zeke Alton		
NannyCam No Filter CEO Baby						Nicole Byer		
Board Member Bradley						Andy Richter		
Yvette						Isabella Crovetti		
Mia						Grace Kaufman		
Antonio						Antony Del Rio		
Austin						Ben Pierce		
Sheriff Potty Pardner						Andy Daly		
Ranger Safety Binkerton						Kyle Chandler		
Santa Claus Ron								George Lopez
PoopyDoopy								Matthew Moy
Jingly Jangly								Dana Davis
LaLa Doo-Da								Jodi Benson
Tippy Tappy Sloppy								Charles DeWayne
Diddly Doo								Kalen Chase
Ding Dong Dongle								Ray Chase
Noth Pole Kyle								Ben Lepley
French Girl								Amaryllis Aubel

== Additional crew ==
=== Films ===
Film	Detail							
Film	Composer	Editor	Production companies	Animation services	Distributor	Running time	Release dates	
Film	The Boss Baby	Hans Zimmer; Steve Mazzaro	James Ryan	DreamWorks Animation	DWA Glendale; DWA India	20th Century Fox	1hr 37mins	March 31, 2017
The Boss Baby: Family Business	Mary Blee; Mark Hester	Hans Zimmer; Steve Mazzaro	DWA Glendale; Jellyfish Pictures	DreamWorks Animation	Universal Pictures	1hr 47mins	July 2, 2021	

=== Television series ===
TV series	Detail				
TV series	Composer(s)	Production companies	Distributor(s)	Network	Running time
The Boss Baby: Back in Business	Ben Bromfield and Ryan Elder	DreamWorks Animation Television	NBCUniversal Television and Streaming; Netflix	Netflix	22–24 minutes
The Boss Baby: Back in the Crib	Ben Bromfield and Ryan Elder	DreamWorks Animation Television	NBCUniversal Television and Streaming; Netflix	Netflix	22 minutes

== Reception ==
=== Box office performance ===
Film	Release date	Box office gross			Budget	Ref.
Film	Release date	North America	Other territories	Worldwide	Budget	Ref.
The Boss Baby	March 31, 2017	$175,003,033	$352,962,903	$527,965,936	$125 million	
The Boss Baby: Family Business	July 2, 2021	$57,300,280	$89,445,000	$146,745,280	$82 million	
Total		$232,303,313	$442,407,903	$674,711,216	$207 million	

=== Critical and public response ===
Critical and public response of The Boss Baby films
Film	Critical		Public	
Film	Rotten Tomatoes	Metacritic	CinemaScore	PostTrak
The Boss Baby	53% (178 reviews)	50 (32 reviews)	A−	—N/a
The Boss Baby: Family Business	47% (101 reviews)	39 (20 reviews)	A	74%

== Chronology ==
Chronological order of The Boss Baby franchise history:

1. The Boss Baby (2017)
2. The Boss Baby and Tim's Treasure Hunt Through Time (2017)
3. The Boss Baby: Back in Business (2018–20)
4. The Boss Baby: Get That Baby! (2020)
5. The Boss Baby: Family Business (2021)
6. Precious Templeton: A Pony Tale (2021)
7. The Boss Baby: Back in the Crib (2022–2023)
8. The Boss Baby: Christmas Bonus (2022)
