= The Boss Baby: Back in Business =

American animated television series (2018–2020)

- Genre: Comedy
- Based on: The Boss Baby by Tom McGrath; The Boss Baby by Marla Frazee
- Developed by: Brandon Sawyer
- Voices of: J. P. Karliak; Pierce Gagnon; Kevin Michael Richardson; Alex Cazares; Eric Bell Jr.
- Theme music composer: J-Radical; Kool Kojak; Tis Himself
- Composers: Ben Bromfield; Ryan Elder
- Country of origin: United States
- Original language: English
- No. of seasons: 4
- No. of episodes: 49 (+ 1 special)

Production
- Executive producer: Brandon Sawyer
- Editor: Matt Barrios
- Running time: 24 minutes
- Production company: DreamWorks Animation Television

Original release
- Network: Netflix
- Release: April 6, 2018 – November 17, 2020

Related
- The Boss Baby (2017); The Boss Baby: Family Business (2021); The Boss Baby: Back in the Crib (2022–23)

The Boss Baby: Back in Business is an American animated comedy television series produced by DreamWorks Animation Television. The show is based on the 2017 film The Boss Baby, loosely based on the 2010 picture book of the same name written by Marla Frazee. The series premiered on Netflix on April 6, 2018. JP Karliak voices The Boss Baby, replacing Alec Baldwin, while Pierce Gagnon replaces Miles Bakshi as Timothy Leslie Templeton; Eric Bell Jr. reprised his role from the film, as The Triplets. The second season premiered on October 12, 2018; the third season premiered on March 16, 2020, an interactive special The Boss Baby: Get That Baby premiered on September 1, 2020, and the fourth and final season premiered on November 17, 2020.

== Summary ==
The series takes place somewhere in the Midwestern United States, near Chicago, between the first and second film. In season one, Boss Baby and Tim work around the world of Baby Corp to stop the company's new enemy, Bootsy Calico, a businessman and former vet who has control over kittens through a bond with them due to his traumatic past. Boss Baby also deals with his boss, Mega Fat CEO Baby, who keeps trying to fire him. In the end, Calico surrenders and is arrested, while Mega Fat is fired after striking a deal with Bootsy.

In season two, Boss Baby deals with a new enemy, Frederick Estes and the Consortium of Ancients. His new boss, Turtleneck Superstar CEO Baby, tasks him with protecting Baby Corp's new product, Stinkless Serum, which can eliminate bad odors forever. In the end, after becoming CEO, Boss Baby takes down Estes and Turtleneck Superstar after she reveals herself to be an old woman guilty of espionage in Baby Corp for the Consortium of Ancients, and they both are arrested.

In season three, Boss Baby is fired when the board of directors think he is the reason why Baby Corp has so many enemies. Boss Baby decides to work with other babies who are in his new playgroup, including a reformed Mega Fat, to get his job back. Meanwhile, Staci and Jimbo, Boss Baby's co-workers and friends, deal with multiple CEOs that get hired and fired quickly. Later, Boss Baby decides to shut down Bubbezee, a company that makes products to keep babies safe, but makes them unhappy, unbeknownst to the parents. Boss Baby then finds out that the CEO of Bubbezee is Happy Sedengry, a businessman who earlier faked a job as a baby communicator, or Babblist, and tried to tear the playgroup apart using his fraud. In the end, Boss Baby takes down Sedengry, who is arrested, and the board of directors rehires him as CEO.

In season four, rehired and promoted to CEO, Boss Baby plans to gain 100% of the world's love, but begins to face new challenges: an all-new dog operated Puppy Co, who are renting a part of Baby Corp's office while plotting against Boss Baby, TV exotic pet sensations Pyg and Tam, who are trying to push Baby Corp into letting them buy the company headquarters so they can turn it into a studio, and OCB, a consultant baby who wants Boss Baby's job. Meanwhile, Tim adjusts as his best friend, Danny Petrosky, is moving due to his paranoid father believing the government found him. After suffering crushing defeats, in the end, Boss Baby finally defeats all three enemies. Pyg, Tam, and Maria–Maria end up in the jail, but after Maria was released, she ended up dancing at a theater school with Noa, who was even meaner and crueler than her. This wasn't shown in the series. OCB and his fan, a previous CEO, end up in a playground, and the puppies end up in a room where they are surrounded by vacuum cleaners. Boss Baby then retires, and promotes Staci as CEO, and Tim sings his "Bro Jam" with Danny. Upon Boss Baby's retirement, he willingly turns himself into a normal baby, as earlier in the season Boss Baby's parents became concerned with his apparent lack of growth. This led Tim and Boss Baby to reconcile with the fact that he must move forward and grow up. In the end, Tim sheds a tear but promises Boss Baby, now Theodore Lindsay Templeton, that he will watch over him.

== Cast ==
- J. P. Karliak as Theodore Lindsey "Ted" Templeton Jr. / The Boss Baby
- Pierce Gagnon as Timothy Leslie "Tim" Templeton
- David W. Collins as Ted Templeton Sr.
- Hope Levy as Janice Templeton
- Kevin Michael Richardson as Jimbo and Buddy from HR
- Alex Cazares as Staci
- Eric Bell Jr. as The Triplets
- Jake Green as Bootsy Calico (season 1) and Donald (season 3)
- Nora Dunn as Gigi (season 2)
- Diedrich Bader as Junior Fancy (season 2 and 4)
- Cynthia Erivo as Turtleneck Superstar (season 2)
- Victor Raider-Wexler as Frederic Estes (season 2)
- Flula Borg as Mega Fat and Officer Doug
- Sarah-Nicole Robles as Marisol
- David Lodge as Magnus
- Aparna Nancherla as Frankie
- Justin Felbinger as Danny Petrosky
- Audrey Huynh as Gina and Tina Namashita (season 3 and 4)
- Aasif Mandvi as OCB (season 4)
- Carla Tassara as Maria–Maria (season 4)
- Dan Bakkedahl as Scary Sweary (season 3)
- Rhys Darby as Happy Sedengry (season 3)
- James Patrick Stuart as Wagby (season 3)
- Bridget Everett as Rattleshake (season 3)
- Cheri Oteri as Multi-Multi-Task (season 3)
- Joel Kim Booster as Travis Le Duque (season 3)
- Regi Davis as Dr. Kevin (season 3)
- Eric Lopez as Hermano Menor (season 3 and 4)
- Brandon Scott as Manager Baby Hendershot
- Kari Wahlgren as Marsha Krinkle & R&D Baby Simmons

== Episodes ==
=== Series overview ===
Season	Episodes	Originally released
1	13	April 6, 2018
2	13	October 12, 2018
3	11	March 16, 2020
Special		September 1, 2020
4	12	November 17, 2020

=== Season 1 (2018) ===
No.	Title	Directed by	Written by	Storyboarded by	Original release date	Nickelodeon air date
1	"Scooter Buskie"	Matt Engstrom	Brandon Sawyer	Scott Cooper, Steve Cooper & Christo Stamboliev	April 6, 2018	October 3, 2025
Boss Baby and the field team must find a way to get a noisy neighborhood baby named Scooter Buskie to stop making noise before he ruins baby love forever. But Tim has other plans which might save Boss Baby's job and baby love.
2	"Cat's in the Cradle"	Pete Jacobs	Brandon Sawyer	Mandy Clotworthy, Steve Cooper & Ben McLaughlin	April 6, 2018	October 10, 2025
After learning that a new enemy named Bootsy Calico (voiced by Jake Green) sent a cat to their house for their parents to take in, The Boss Baby and Tim must do whatever they can to get it kicked out, without getting their parents attention.
3	"Family Fun Night"	Matt Engstrom & Allan Jacobsen	JD Ryznar	Zeus Cervas, Scott Cooper, Glenn Harmon, Brian Hatfield, Trevor Tamboline & Kenji Ono	April 6, 2018	October 17, 2025
The Tempeltons receive tickets for family fun night at a local restaurant but Boss Baby soon finds out that Bootsy Calico plots to make people love cats more than babies.
4	"Formula for Menace: A Dekker Moonboots Mystery"	Allan Jacobsen	Sam Cherington	Scott Cooper, Kenji Ono, Greg Leysens & Paul Scarlata	April 6, 2018	October 24, 2025
When babies from Baby Corp start to age, the field team realizes that the baby formula is tainted and they must find a way to revert the formula back to normal.
5	"Monster Machine"	Pete Jacobs	Alexandra Decas & Melanie Kirschbaum	Mandy Clothworthy & Ben McLaughlin	April 6, 2018	November 7, 2025
The field team decides to infiltrate a baby pageant to replace the current winner with a better role model for babies, Jimbo. However, Jimbo becomes the winner's bodyguard, and Tim must get Jimbo back before Staci sabotages the competition.
6	"The Constipation Situation"	Christo Stamboliev	Sam Cherington	Ian Abando, Wolf-Rüdiger Bloss, Paul Cohen, Fred Gonzales, Howard Perry & Rossen Varbanov	April 6, 2018	November 14, 2025
Boss Baby refuses to take a day off when he is constipated, and Mega Fat CEO Baby says he will fire him if he works, so the field team decides to go solo to stop Bootsy Calico's latest plot.
7	"The Boss Babysitter"	Allan Jacobsen	Alexandra Decas & Melanie Kirschbaum	Clayton Christman, Brian Hatfield & Arielle Rosenstein	April 6, 2018	November 21, 2025
The Templeton parents do the unthinkable and leave Boss Baby and Tim with a babysitter named Marisol whom Tim takes a shine to on despite Boss Baby's refusal.
8	"Into the Belly of the Den of the House of the Nest of Cats"	Pete Jacobs	Alexandra Decas & Melanie Kirschbaum	Jerome Co & Ben McLaughlin	April 6, 2018	November 28, 2025
Tim tries to get his neighborhood help badge from the neighbor next door but discovers something more sinister about her while Boss Baby and Stacy go undercover as cats in her house to retrieve Jimbo.
9	"Spirit Day"	Christo Stamboliev	Sam Cherington	Wolf-Rüdiger Bloss & Fred Gonzales	April 6, 2018	December 5, 2025
During their annual neighborhood festival, in which Ted will be playing rock in front of the whole town, Boss Baby and Tim work to beat Mega Fat CEO Baby in a competition during Baby Corp's annual "Spirit Day", and make it back in time.
10	"Par Avion"	Christo Stamboliev	Brandon Sawyer	Paul Cunningham, Fred Gonzales, Brian Hatfield & Jon Magram	April 6, 2018	December 12, 2025
After losing the Spirit Day competition to Boss Baby, Mega Fat stages an airplane ride to Paris with 13 babies (including the field team) onboard, in which all of them crying will give him the chance to fire him. With both Boss Baby and the parents asleep for the whole trip, it is up to Tim and Staci to keep every baby happy and deal with Mega Fat's inside man until they reach their destination.
11	"Cat Cop!"	Pete Jacobs	JD Ryznar	Mandy Clotworthy & Ben McLaughlin	April 6, 2018	January 2, 2026
After the plane ride home, Boss Baby finds out that a cat from Bootsy Calico is working as a police officer, and staging crimes to drive baby families out of town forever. Meanwhile, Tim is taught by Boss Baby how to negotiate.
12	"Hang in There, Baby"	Allan Jacobsen	JD Ryznar	Paul Cunningham & Arielle Rosenstein	April 6, 2018	January 9, 2026
When Mega Fat CEO Baby claims he has dirt on everyone, the field team try find out what dirt he has on Boss Baby by staging a break-in.
13	"Six Well-Placed Kittens"	Christo Stamboliev	Brandon Sawyer	Wolf-Rüdiger Bloss & Fred Gonzales	April 6, 2018	January 16, 2026
After the events of the last episode, Tim and Boss Baby are grounded and kept under high surveillance by Ted and Janice. However, Bootsy Calico's master plan is in full swing, and Boss Baby is determined to stop it.

=== Season 2 (2018) ===
No. overall	No. in season	Title	Directed by	Written by	Storyboarded by	Original release date	Nickelodeon air date
14	1	"As the Diaper Changes"	Pete Jacobs	Sam Cherington	Jerome Co & Ben McLaughlin	October 12, 2018	January 23, 2026
During his meeting with the board of directors, Boss Baby learns that they want him to introduce the new CEO (not become one as he originally thought), because the real new CEO, Turtleneck Superstar from R&D, had invented stinkless serum, a serum that can permanently erase all forms of stink from anyone, which she later entrusts him on guarding it to. Meanwhile, the Templetons grandmother comes to help for the rest of the summer, making the brothers summer roommates, while also gaining the attention of a new nemesis in the form of a creepy old man named Frederic Estes.
15	2	"Super Cool Big Kids, Inc."	Allan Jacobsen	Alexandra Decas & Melanie Kirschbaum	Paul Cunningham, Brian Hatfield, & Rob Porter	October 12, 2018	January 30, 2026
Determined to strike Estes first, Boss Baby and his team humiliate him by baking cookies that cause him to sneeze on live television, however, this causes two side effects, first by making Tim (not wanting to be caught in the middle of the war for love) start his own company dubbed "Super Cool Big Kids, Inc." with his friend Danny Petrosky, and Frederic forming the "Consortium of Ancients" after telling the other elders that a baby tampered with the cookies. The field team and Consortium go about bringing out both of their sides angry sides by any means necessary, but it also caused both of their love to shrink down completely while big kids (Tim among them), have gotten more, Boss Baby tries one last attempt to get the world to hate elders more, but Tim, who saw this coming, has Danny distribute warm milk and cookies to cool down the tensions, leading to a truce.
16	3	"P.U.!"	Christo Stamboliev	JD Ryznar	Fred Gonzales & Wolf-Rüdiger Bloss	October 12, 2018	February 6, 2026
During a meeting at Baby Corp, its leading scientist Simmons thinks she cracked the formula for stinkless serum and tests it on herself (as she hasn't taken a single bath for an entire week while doing so), however, she hasn't slept all week too, and in doing so, has made a stink enhancer and Boss Baby needs to get her original serum fast. Meanwhile, Tim starts a driver's branch for the next stage in his company: making money.
17	4	"Hush, Little Baby"	Pete Jacobs	Brandon Sawyer	Jerome Co & Ben McLaughlin	October 12, 2018	February 13, 2026
To show Gigi that Boss Baby is just a regular Baby, he goes to the library for Storytime with the field team, and while not finding it enjoyable at first, he grows to like Storytime and even gains Gigi's trust to do anything. Unfortunately, she informs Frederic Estes of this development, who ignites a turf war by making the library enhance their "no noise" rule and even getting a police officer to get any babies who make noise kicked out. Eventually, Boss Baby and his team manage to turn the tables on the Consortium of Ancients and reclaim the library for all babies.
18	5	"Night of the Frodarg"	Allan Jacobsen	Sam Cherington	Paul Cunningham & Brian Hatfield	October 12, 2018	February 20, 2026
During a dark and stormy night, the Templeton brothers are too busy with their personal enemies to work together, with Tim preparing for "the Frodarg", an urban town legend that comes out during a summer rainstorm, and Boss Baby preparing to protect stinkless serum from Puppy Co.'s number 1 agent, Bug the Pug.
19	6	"Fugitive's Day Out"	Christo Stamboliev	Brandon Sawyer	Wolf-Rüdiger Bloss & Fred Gonzales	October 12, 2018	February 27, 2026
After succeeding to protect the serum in the last episode, Boss Baby then sets his sights on finding the one who told Puppy Co. in an effort to become CEO, so he "borrows" a key that gives access to the Chupie Tracker, a device that shows anyone who used a chupie anywhere, but unfortunately, he learns he was somehow framed for selling out stinkless serum. Now on the run, Boss Baby must clear his name and avoid capture from his old rival mega fat, now "Mega Fat regular Baby"- who is in charge of bringing him in.
20	7	"El Apasionado Negocio de la Niñera"	Pete Jacobs	Alexandra Decas & Melanie Kirschbaum	Jerome Co & Ben McLaughlin	October 12, 2018	March 6, 2026
Frederic goes for another strike in the war for love by convincing Marisol, Boss Baby's usual babysitter, to go from looking after babies to old people. As a result, other babysitters soon follow along, and with no one to watch their babies, parents stress levels increase big time. Now the Templeton brothers must find a way to convince Marisol to go back to babysitting fast. Translation: "The Passionate Business of Nannying"
21	8	"Plushythingy"	Allan Jacobsen	Megan Atkinson	Paul Cunningham & Brian Hatfield	October 12, 2018	March 13, 2026
In a new attempt to steal baby love, Frederic designs a baby toy he calls "Plushythingy" that makes every baby in town, including the field team, love it. At the height of its success, he reveals all of its design flaws so he can take them all away, while secretly keeping one to make the field team fight each other, now it is up to Tim (who is still learning to move from the loss of his own toy) to destroy it before the team destroys each other.
22	9	"Number One Problem"	Pete Jacobs	JD Ryznar	Ben McLaughlin & Steve Trenbirth	October 12, 2018	April 3, 2026
Turtleneck Superstar CEO Baby has everyone to try and "smash the box", which inspires Boss Baby to solve all the lonesome files, Baby Corps hardest cases, at the same time Gigi decides to potty train Boss baby by setting up Potty chairs all over the house and having him completely diaperless, and much to Tim's horror, it increases his IQ by a million.
23	10	"Picture Perfect"	Christo Stamboliev	Sam Cherington	Fred Gonzales & Wolf-Rüdiger Bloss	October 12, 2018	April 10, 2026
After discovering that Ted is feeling left out in all the fun summer times, Boss Baby and Tim decide to go on a "Dudes Weekend", while Jimbo and Staci struggle to work together without Boss Baby to return a blanket to its owner.
24	11	"Play It Again, Tim"	Allan Jacobsen	Alexandra Decas & Melanie Kirschbaum	Paul Cunningham & Brian Hatfield	October 12, 2018	April 17, 2026
During the last days of Summer vacation, Tim's parents sign him up for Piano lessons for a future family rock band. Boss Baby advises him to mess up at said lessons, but discovers that it is part of a larger plot by Frederic to get all babies with older siblings to act more like old people. He at first breaks the hyponosis by getting Tim to act like himself again, but when that fails, he gets the family to play a rock solo in front of him to get his old self back. Just as things settle down, Frederic pops up and not only reveals he knows about Baby Corp, but that while the family was out, he snuck into their house and swiped stinkless serum.
25	12	"Research & Development"	Pete Jacobs	Sam Cherington	Ben McLaughlin & Steve Trenbirth	October 12, 2018	April 24, 2026
Determined to crack the formula for stinkless serum, Turtleneck Superstar CEO baby declares that whoever solves the formula will be officially made her replacement, which causes the entire company to go nuts on each other. In the end, Boss Baby is surprisingly named the winner, but Tim, watching his brother step on everyone just to get that promotion, decides to quit the field team, only to discover that Frederic has kidnapped Turtleneck.
26	13	"Wrinkles & Stinkles"	Christo Stamboliev	JD Ryznar	Wolf-Rüdiger Bloss & Fred Gonzales	October 12, 2018	May 1, 2026
A newly crowned Boss Baby leads an attack on Frederic's Funhouse he and his friends set up at the town's annual "End of Summer" festival, where he has Turtleneck held hostage. However, Turtleneck reveals that she's not only working with Frederic, but is an old lady herself and his wife. They reveal that their plan was to keep Boss Baby and his team distracted while she sowed chaos in Baby Corp and revealed that the contest in the last episode was just a way to collect everyone's failed attempts and unleash it on Babykind, starting now. While everyone leaves Boss Baby after realizing he was never the new CEO, he reads a letter from Tim and is inspired to be a Boss anyone can count on. With Gigi's help, Boss Baby prevents every Baby in town from being stanked by getting stanked himself, earning him the trust & love of both Gigi and Baby Corp, he stole back original stinkless serum as a thank you gift. Tim decides to not quit the field team and he and Boss Baby later watch their enemies get arrested for their stink.

=== Season 3 (2020) ===
No. overall	No. in season	Title	Directed by	Written by	Storyboarded by	Original release date	Nickelodeon air date
27	1	"Bossa Nova"	Dan Forgione	Brandon Sawyer	Matt Engstrom, Dan Forgione & Christo Stamboliev	March 16, 2020	September 11, 2026
Despite saving Baby Corp two times in a row, The Board of directors fire Boss Baby as they believe he's the reason Baby Corp keeps getting new enemies. Now given a 6-month supply of the formula that keeps him young, Boss Baby is forced to join a playgroup with his former enemy Mega Fat, now the son of Marsha Krinkle, and with a toy robot Kangaroo called W.A.G.B.Y (Who's a good baby), while the rest of Baby Corp has to deal with the tantrum-throwing newly promoted Scary Sweary CEO Baby. After several failed attempts to find a new purpose, Boss Baby learns how capable his fellow play groupers can be and decides to make them his new field team to increase baby love so Baby Corp will beg him to come back.
28	2	"The Museum Job"	Matt Whitlock	Tanner Tananbaum	Fred Gonzales, Whitney Martin & Matt Whitlock	March 16, 2020	September 18, 2026
For his playgroup's first mission, Boss Baby convinces the parents to take them to the museum where he learns that the reason baby love is dropping is because the public toilet is being occupied by a pre-kindergartener. Although successful, he discovers that a prized kazzoo was swiped in the process and successfully returns it. Meanwhile, Jimbo and Staci distract Scary Sweary by saying he got the day off, but they distract him for so long that the board of directors fire him upon his return.
29	3	"Ga Ba Goo Ba Ga (The Babblist)"	Pete Jacobs	JD Ryznar	Federico Ferrari, Darwin Tan & Pete Yong	March 16, 2020	September 25, 2026
As part of a Business leisure he convinced Tim to make, Boss Baby helps him raise enough money to buy a Magic kit, but learns that a man named Happy Sedangry (voiced by Rhys Darby), who is a Bubeezee certified babblist (someone who can talk to babies), is trying to tear the playgroup apart. Boss Baby and Tim ultimately get Sedangry exposed as a fraud on live television, saving the playgroup.
30	4	"The Coo Chi Coup"	Dan Forgione	Sarah Katin & Nakia Trower Shuman	Paul Cunningham, Jason Dorf & Dylan Holden	March 16, 2020	October 2, 2026
Boss Baby and Tim are pressured by Staci and Jimbo into getting Scary Sweary's replacement, Rattleshake CEO baby, fired due to her over-enthusiastic behavior and constant rattling, and because the playgroup is off for the weekend and she has made everyone go on a retreat, the old field team come up with a plan to stage an accident to get her fired by the Board.
31	5	"Lights, Camera, Org Chart!"	Pete Jacobs	Tanner Tananbaum	Federico Ferrari, Darwin Tan & Gener Ocampo	March 16, 2020	October 9, 2026
Boss Baby makes an Org Chart to better organize his playgroup, as well as finding a new way to get back at Baby Corp, which is to get his playgroup on the front page of a magazine published by Bubeezee. Unfortunately, things go awry when the photographer in charge scrambles the order Boss Baby wanted it to be and causes the team to turn against each other.
32	6	"The Big Break"	Matt Whitlock	Brandon Sawyer	Lynell Forestall, Fred Gonzales & Whitney Martin	March 16, 2020	October 16, 2026
After Tim accidentally breaks Boss Baby's arm, he is forced to go to the office of wannabe comedian Dr. Kevin. However, after this experience, Boss Baby sees this as his biggest way of getting back to Baby Co. by making the babies who go there happy. But while the plan is ultimately successful, he learns that the quiet psycho baby (whose real name is Joy) of the group actually likes the jokes Dr. Kevin makes and gets the lesson from local crazy kid Danny Petrosky that everyone has their own way of doing things and inspires Dr. Kevin to be funny to babies who actually like it.
33	7	"Escape from Krinkle's"	Dan Forgione	JD Ryznar	Paul Cunningham, Jason Dorf & Dylan Holden	March 16, 2020	October 23, 2026
34	8	"Puppy Party"	Pete Jacobs	Tanner Tananbaum	Federico Ferrari, Darwin Tan & Gener Ocampo	March 16, 2020	October 30, 2026
35	9	"Mega Fat"	Matt Whitlock	JD Ryznar	Lynell Forestall, Fred Gonzales & Whitney Martin	March 16, 2020	November 6, 2026
36	10	"Halloween"	Matt Whitlock	Sarah Katin & Nakia Trower Shuman	Lynell Forestall, Fred Gonzales & Whitney Martin	March 16, 2020	October 12, 2026
37	11	"Who's a Good Baby?"	Dan Forgione	Brandon Sawyer	Paul Cunningham, Jason Dorf & Dylan Holden	March 16, 2020	November 13, 2026

=== Special (2020) ===
Title	Directed by	Written by	Storyboarded by	Original release date	Nickelodeon air date
"The Boss Baby: Get That Baby!"	Dan Forgione, Pete Jacobs & Matt Whitlock	Sarah Katin, Nakia Trower Shuman, JD Ryznar, Brandon Sawyer & Tanner Tananbaum	Paul Cunningham, Jason Dorf, Federico Ferrari, Lynell Forestall, Fred Gonzales, Dylan Holden, Whitney Martin, Gener Ocampo & Darwin Tan	September 1, 2020	TBA
Tim and Boss Baby must stop a scheme to kidnap all babies.

=== Season 4 (2020) ===
No. overall	No. in season	Title	Directed by	Written by	Storyboarded by	Original release date	Nickelodeon air date
38	1	"Yellow 100"	Pete Jacobs	Brandon Sawyer	Derek Moore, Gener Ocampo & Darwin Tan	November 17, 2020	November 20, 2026
39	2	"Pyg & Tam"	Dan Forgione	Sarah Katin & Nakia Trower Shuman	Paul Cunningham, Jason Dorf & Dylan Holden	November 17, 2020	TBA
40	3	"Conference Room B"	Matt Whitlock	Tanner Tananbaum	Lynell Forestall, Fred Gonzales & Whitney Martin	November 17, 2020	TBA
41	4	"Game Plan"	Pete Jacobs	JD Ryznar	Gener Ocampo, Derek Moore & Darwin Tan	November 17, 2020	TBA
42	5	"Night Owls"	Dan Forgione	Sarah Katin & Nakia Trower Shuman	Paul Cunningham, Jason Dorf & Dylan Holden	November 17, 2020	TBA
43	6	"OCB"	Matt Whitlock	Tanner Tananbaum	Lynell Forestall, Fred Gonzales & Whitney Martin	November 17, 2020	TBA
44	7	"Chicago"	Pete Jacobs	JD Ryznar	Tony Lovett, Derek Moore, Gener Ocampo & Darwin Tan	November 17, 2020	TBA
45	8	"Baby Boss"	Matt Whitlock	Sarah Katin & Nakia Trower Shuman	Lynell Forestall, Fred Gonzales & Whitney Martin	November 17, 2020	TBA
46	9	"Boom Baby"	Dan Forgione	Phil Binder	Paul Cunningham, Jason Dorf & Dylan Holden	November 17, 2020	TBA
47	10	"The Fumbling of Football Mike"	Pete Jacobs	Tanner Tananbaum	Federico Ferrari, Tony Lovett & Darwin Tan	November 17, 2020	TBA
48	11	"Teambuilding"	Dan Forgione	JD Ryznar	Paul Cunningham, Jason Dorf & Dylan Holden	November 17, 2020	TBA
49	12	"Theo 100"	Matt Whitlock	Brandon Sawyer	Lynell Forestall, Fred Gonzales & Whitney Martin	November 17, 2020	TBA

== Release ==
The series premiered its first season on Netflix in the US on April 6, 2018. The second season was released October 12, 2018. The third season was released on March 16, 2020. An interactive special titled as "The Boss Baby: Get That Baby!" was released on September 1, 2020. It was later removed from Netflix on December 1, 2024 due to the discontinuation of interactive content. The fourth season was released on November 17, 2020.

The series made its linear TV premiere on Nickelodeon in the United States on October 3, 2025.

== Awards and nominations ==
Year	Award	Category	Nominee	Result	Ref.
2019	Kidscreen Awards	Best New Series	The Boss Baby: Back in Business	Nominated	
2019	Kidscreen Awards	Best Animated Series	The Boss Baby: Back in Business	Nominated	
2019	Kids' Choice Awards	Favorite Cartoon	The Boss Baby: Back in Business	Nominated	
2021	Kids' Choice Awards	Favorite Animated Series	The Boss Baby: Back in Business	Nominated	
