= The Boss Baby: Back in the Crib =

DreamWorks Animation television series

- Genre: Comedy
- Based on: The Boss Baby and The Bossier Baby by; Marla Frazee; Characters from the films by Tom McGrath and Michael McCullers
- Developed by: Brandon Sawyer
- Voices of: J. P. Karliak; Mary Faber; Ariana Greenblatt; Maya Tanida; Max Mittelman; Krizia Bajos; Raul Ceballos
- Theme music composer: Mark Nilan Jr.; Nick Cecconi; BLKMKT
- Composers: Ben Bromfield; Ryan Elder
- Country of origin: United States
- Original language: English
- No. of seasons: 2
- No. of episodes: 28

Production
- Executive producer: Brandon Sawyer
- Running time: 24 minutes
- Production company: DreamWorks Animation Television

Original release
- Network: Netflix
- Release: May 19, 2022 – April 13, 2023

Related
- The Boss Baby: Family Business (2021); The Boss Baby: Back in Business (2018–20)

The Boss Baby: Back in the Crib is an American animated comedy television series, created by Brandon Sawyer, and produced by DreamWorks Animation Television for Netflix. Loosely based on the books by Marla Frazee, and serving as a follow-up to the 2021 film The Boss Baby: Family Business, the series focuses on Ted Templeton as he is forced to resume his old life as Boss Baby, working alongside his niece Tina, while contending with several issues that impede babies from receiving full attention and love from adults.

The series featured a new cast, though with J. P. Karliak reprising his role from the 2018 series The Boss Baby: Back in Business. Back in the Crib premiered in May 2022, and ran for two seasons, though received mixed reception from critics.

== Synopsis ==
Following the events of the 2021 film The Boss Baby: Family Business, Theodore Lindsay "Ted" Templeton finds himself wanted by the FBI for embezzlement, finding out that his company's board of executives framed him for their own crime. To avoid capture, Ted makes use of a special baby formula developed by Baby Corp to rejuvenate himself into a baby again, hoping to hide from his pursuers by returning to his old life as the Boss Baby and living with his older brother Tim and his family - Carol, his wife; Tabitha, his eldest daughter; and Tina, his younger daughter, and an employee of Baby Corp. To co-exist with them, Ted returns to working with Baby Corp and helping them ensure that babies receive love and attention from grownups, while Carol is let in on the life he and Tina lead - a fact that no adult must know about, otherwise their minds would break.

Throughout much of the first season, Ted focuses on working alongside Tina's team, as they contend with new issues brought about by a new group of arch-nemeses to the company. In the second season, Ted and Tina launch their own baby-love company after being fired by Baby Corp, contending with a new adversary who sought to ruin their lives and take over the company.

== Cast ==
- J. P. Karliak as Theodore Lindsey "Ted" Templeton Jr. / The Boss Baby
- Ariana Greenblatt (Season 1, Season 2 E1-E4) as Tabitha Templeton
  - Maya Tanida (Season 2 E5-E16) as Tabitha Templeton
- Mary Faber as Tina Templeton / The New Boss Baby
- Max Mittelman as Timothy Leslie "Tim" Templeton
  - Pierce Gagnon as Teenage Tim
- Krizia Bajos as Carol Templeton, I.T. Baby Cammy and Yaya
- Alex Cazares as JJ and Staci
- Karan Soni as Pip
- Zeke Alton as Dez
- Nicole Byer as NannyCam No Filter CEO Baby
- Grace Kaufman as Uncuddleable Mia
- Antony Del Rio as Uncuddleable Antonio
- Ben Pierce as Uncuddleable Austin
- Kyle Chandler as Ranger Safety Binkerton
- Mara Junot as R&D Baby Simmons
- Kari Wahlgren as Marsha Krinkle the Channel 8 News Reporter and Security Baby Katja
- Isabella Crovetti as Yvette
- Kevin Michael Richardson as Buddy from HR, Mayor Jimbo, Amal and Agent Brown
- Andy Richter as Board Member Bradley
- Andy Daly as Sheriff Potty Pardner
- Dee Bradley Baker as Curtis "Lumpy" the Park Duck, Precious Templeton and Priest Scooter Buckie
- Diedrich Bader as Junior Fancy Jr.
- Josh Keaton as Harve
- Cissy Jones as Hilde
- Hope Levy as Peg
- Brandon Scott as CEO Baby Hendershot
- Aparna Nacherla as Frankie
- Nicole Gose as Melissa
- Taran Killam as Ace
- Amy Walker as Female FBI Agent Brown, Stella and Aoife
- Donald Faison as Dr. Thubberirhd
- Fred Melamed as Russ Tisdale
- Raul Ceballos as Uncle Benji Guerrero
- Mark Mercado as Tyler
- Matt Surges as Chet
- Flula Borg as Mega Fat RV Saving Man, The Luxes

== Episodes ==
=== Series overview ===
Season	Episodes	Originally released
1	12	May 19, 2022
2	16	April 13, 2023

=== Season 1 (2022) ===
No. overall	No. in season	Title	Directed by	Written by	Storyboarded by	Original release date
1	1	"The Business Boss: Back in Baby"	Dan Forgione	Brandon Sawyer	Fernando Corrales; Lorraine Howard; Patricia Ross	May 19, 2022
2	2	"The Stroll"	Matt Whitlock	Megan Atkinson	Tenaya Anue; Fred Gonzales; Dylan Holden	May 19, 2022
3	3	"Potty Mouth"	Pete Jacobs	Tanner Tananbaum	Regine Clarke; Murray Debus; Lianne Hughes	May 19, 2022
4	4	"Imaginary Friends"	Dan Forgione	JD Ryznar	Fernando Corrales; Lorraine Howard; Patricia Ross	May 19, 2022
5	5	"Turf War"	Matt Whitlock	Megan Atkinson	Tenaya Anue; Fred Gonzales; Sean Kreiner	May 19, 2022
6	6	"Trading Up"	Pete Jacobs	Annabel Seymour	Regine Clarke; Murray Debus; Lianne Hughes; Scott Hurney	May 19, 2022
7	7	"War of the Cheeks"	Dan Forgione	Brandon Sawyer	Fernando Corrales; Lorraine Howard; Patricia Ross	May 19, 2022
8	8	"Techy Tykes"	Pete Jacobs	Megan Atkinson	Regine Clarke; Aaron Davies; Scott Hurney	May 19, 2022
9	9	"Birthday Blues"	Matt Whitlock	Tanner Tananbaum	Tenaya Anue; Fred Gonzales; Ariel Song	May 19, 2022
10	10	"Sitting Ducks"	Dan Forgione	Phil Binder	Fernando Corrales; Lorraine Howard; Patricia Ross	May 19, 2022
11	11	"The Big Dumpling"	Matt Whitlock	Annabel Seymour	Tenaya Anue; Fred Gonzales; Ariel Song	May 19, 2022
12	12	"The Great Medieval London Fire of 1135"	Pete Jacobs	Tanner Tananbaum	Regine Clarke; Aaron Davies; Scott Hurney	May 19, 2022

=== Season 2 (2023) ===
No. overall	No. in season	Title	Directed by	Written by	Storyboarded by	Original release date
13	1	"Untitled Templeton Project"	Dan Forgione	Megan Atkinson	Fernando Corrales; Lorraine Howard; Patricia Ross	April 13, 2023
14	2	"Puppy Love"	Matt Whitlock	JD Ryznar	Tenaya Anue; Fred Gonzales; Ariel Song	April 13, 2023
15	3	"Biscuits Rising"	Pete Jacobs	Annabel Seymour	Regine Clarke; Aaron Davies; Scott Hurney; Quynh Truong	April 13, 2023
16	4	"Moon Shot"	Dan Forgione	Tanner Tananbaum	Fernando Corrales; Lorraine Howard; Patricia Ross	April 13, 2023
17	5	"Inner Children"	Matt Whitlock	Phil Binder	Tenaya Anue; Fred Gonzales; Ariel Song	April 13, 2023
18	6	"Poompf!"	Pete Jacobs	Megan Atkinson	Regine Clarke; Aaron Davies; Simon Williams	April 13, 2023
19	7	"The Heat Is On"	Dan Forgione	JD Ryznar	Fernando Corrales; Lorraine Howard; Patricia Ross	April 13, 2023
20	8	"One Tricked Pony"	Matt Whitlock	Annabel Seymour	Tenaya Anue; Fred Gonzales; Ariel Song	April 13, 2023
21	9	"Federal Slumber Party"	Pete Jacobs	Brandon Sawyer	Aaron Davies; Regine Clarke; Simon Williams	April 13, 2023
22	10	"Floaties"	Dan Forgione	Tanner Tananbaum	Fernando Corrales; Lorraine Howard; Patricia Ross	April 13, 2023
23	11	"Breaking the Bank"	Matt Whitlock	Megan Atkinson	Tenaya Anue; Fred Gonzales; Ariel Song	April 13, 2023
24	12	"Hate That Baby!"	Pete Jacobs	Annabel Seymour	Regine Clarke; Aaron Davies; Simon Williams	April 13, 2023
25	13	"North of the Border"	Unknown	Unknown	TBA	April 13, 2023
26	14	"Intensive Purposes"	Matt Whitlock	Megan Atkinson; JD Ryznar; Brandon Sawyer; Annabel Seymour; Tanner Tananbaum	Tenaya Anue; Fred Gonzales; Ariel Song	April 13, 2023
27	15	"The Unshakeable Bear"	Dan Forgione	Megan Atkinson; JD Ryznar; Brandon Sawyer; Annabel Seymour; Tanner Tananbaum	Fernando Corrales; Lorraine Howard; Patricia Ross	April 13, 2023
28	16	"Ba-Ba Town"	Matt Whitlock	Megan Atkinson; JD Ryznar; Brandon Sawyer; Annabel Seymour; Tanner Tananbaum	Tenaya Anue; Fred Gonzales; Ariel Song	April 13, 2023

== Production ==
Inspiration for the series happened when creator Brandon Sawyer watched a rough cut of The Boss Baby: Family Business by Tom McGrath and Michael McCullers. The series was worked on during the production of the sequel.

Animation for the series was provided by Technicolor Animation Productions.

On September 27, 2023, executive producer Sawyer replied in a now-deleted post on Twitter to a question about whether the second season was truly its last, saying that season 2 was "the end of Back in the Crib", signifying that the series was over after two seasons.

== Release ==
The series premiered on Netflix on May 19, 2022. A second season was released on April 13, 2023.

== Reception ==
Common Sense Media gave Back in the Crib 2 out of 5 stars for having "too much dark sarcasm" and "consumerism in an unpleasant series".
