= All the World =

2009 children's picture book by Liz Garton Scanlon

- Author: Liz Garton Scanlon
- Illustrator: Marla Frazee
- Language: English
- Published: September 8, 2009
- Publisher: Beach Lane Books
- Publication place: United States
- Pages: 40
- Award: Caldecott Honor
- ISBN: 978-1-4169-8580-8

All the World is a 2009 children's picture book written by Liz Garton Scanlon, and illustrated by Marla Frazee. Scanlon's second book, it was critically acclaimed and won a Caldecott Honor in 2010.

== Synopsis ==
The book follows a group of family and friends in a seaside community from morning until night, and illustrates the importance of both the largest and smallest moments in life.

== Reception ==
=== Pre-release ===
Two months prior to its release, Daniel Kraus of The Booklist wrote: "Scanlon uses a pleasing rhythm to move from normal-life specifics all the way to more existential concepts.... Adults should enjoy this, too, which will only increase its popularity." The following month, All the World was the subject of a starred review in Kirkus, which concluded thus: "At once a lullaby and an invigorating love song to nature, families and interconnectedness."

=== Post-release ===
Upon its publication, The Horn Book Magazine's Jennifer M. Brabander said, "Scanlon's text has a child-friendly simplicity reminiscent of Margaret Wise Brown around which Frazee's illustrations build a satisfying narrative.... All the World will win audiences with a sensibility both timeless and thoroughly modern." Writing in The Bulletin of the Center for Children's Books, Deborah Stevenson praised Frazee's work and called the story "a moving and accessible celebration of the poetry of ordinary human life".

"[Scanlon's] second book," said Andrew Bast in The New York Times Book Review, "weaves a sumptuous and openhearted poem of 18 couplets over 38 pages, all revolving around the title's singsong refrain. The verses take readers from an unexplored beach to a busy music-filled family room and into a tranquil, moonlit night. Beautifully illustrated by Maria Frazee, who won a Caldecott Honor this year for A Couple of Boys Have the Best Week Ever, it's the kind of book that will be pulled off the shelf at bedtime over and over again." Bast, however, added that the book "may be...just too beautiful" at the expense of a nonexistent story.

All the World was the recipient of the 2010 Caldecott Honor for Frazee's illustrations.

== Adaptation ==
A six-minute animated short film based on the book, narrated by Joanne Woodward and directed by Galen Fott, was released by Weston Woods Studios in 2011.
