= The Boss Baby =

2017 animated film by Tom McGrath

- Theatrical release poster
- Directed by: Tom McGrath
- Written by: Michael McCullers
- Based on: The Boss Baby by Marla Frazee
- Produced by: Ramsey Ann Naito
- Starring: Alec Baldwin; Steve Buscemi; Jimmy Kimmel; Lisa Kudrow; Miles Bakshi; Tobey Maguire
- Edited by: James Ryan
- Music by: Hans Zimmer; Steve Mazzaro
- Production company: DreamWorks Animation
- Distributed by: 20th Century Fox (Note: In 2018, the film's distribution rights were transferred from 20th Century Fox to Universal Pictures, who distributed the film in Japan, following NBCUniversal's acquisition of DreamWorks Animation in 2016.)
- Release dates: March 12, 2017 (Miami); March 31, 2017 (United States)
- Running time: 97 minutes
- Country: United States
- Language: English
- Budget: $125 million
- Box office: $528 million

The Boss Baby is a 2017 American animated spy comedy film produced by DreamWorks Animation. Directed by Tom McGrath and written by Michael McCullers, it is loosely based on the eponymous picture book by Marla Frazee. The film follows a boy helping his baby brother who is a secret agent in the war for adults' love between babies and puppies. The Boss Baby features the voices of Alec Baldwin, Steve Buscemi, Jimmy Kimmel, Lisa Kudrow, and Tobey Maguire.

The Boss Baby premiered at the Miami International Film Festival on March 12, 2017, and was released in the United States on March 31 by 20th Century Fox. The film received mixed reviews from critics and was a commercial success, grossing $528 million worldwide against a $125 million budget. The film was nominated for Best Animated Feature at the 90th Academy Awards, the Annie Awards, and the Golden Globes.

The success of the film spawned a franchise, including two television series, The Boss Baby: Back in Business and The Boss Baby: Back In the Crib, and a sequel film, The Boss Baby: Family Business (2021).

== Plot ==
Tim Templeton, an imaginative 7-year-old boy, is taken aback when his new baby brother, known as "the Boss Baby", arrives. Baby wears a suit and tie and acts like a normal baby around parents, but acts like an adult when parents are absent. Tim catches him one night and Baby tells him that he needs to make way for the next generation and stay out of his way. The next day, Baby holds a staff meeting with five other infants, under the guise of a neighborhood play date. Tim attempts to record them on a tape before Baby and his cronies spot and chase him, resulting in it being destroyed. With no evidence to support him, Tim is grounded for trying to get rid of Baby and is ordered to stay in the house with him until he learns to get along, much to both of their dismay.

Later, Baby reveals the truth as to why he is in his house and where he comes from. He and Tim suck a special pacifier that allows them to see Baby Corp, where babies come from. Most babies go to families, but those unresponsive to tickling are sent to management, where they are given a special baby formula that allows them to think and behave like adults while remaining young forever. Baby explains he is on a special mission to investigate the declining love for babies due to puppies, which is why he came to the Templetons as Tim's parents work for Puppy Co, and he will leave once his mission is done. Once he does, he will get a promotion to CEO. However, the boys hear Baby's boss threatening to fire him if he fails, which would mean Baby would have to stay, have his formula taken away, slowly turn into a normal baby, and grow up with the Templeton family. Tim and Baby team up to prevent this.

On Take Your Kids to Work Day, the parents lift the grounding when the boys pretend to love each other and take Tim and Baby with them to Puppy Co. While investigating, they are caught by Puppy Co.'s CEO, Francis E. Francis, who is then revealed to be Baby's longtime idol: Super Colossal Big Fat Boss Baby, a former CEO of Baby Corp. Francis revealed that he was fired from Baby Corp because his lactose intolerance rendered the formula useless to him. He takes away Baby's formula to create a "Forever Puppy", a puppy incapable of aging, which will take all the love from babies and get him his revenge on Baby Corp.

Francis takes Tim's parents to a conference in Las Vegas and leaves his older brother, Eugene, to watch the boys under the guise of a female nanny. The boys attack Eugene with fake vomit and escape him with the help of the neighborhood babies. After traveling to Las Vegas in a plane full of Elvis impersonators, they find Francis ready to launch a rocket of Forever Puppies out into the world. Tim's parents are trapped below the rocket to be burned. Tim and Baby fight Francis on a catwalk, making him fall into a vat of formula that turns him back into a baby; Eugene takes Francis away to "raise him right". Tim and Baby save Tim's parents and eject the Forever Puppies from the rocket before it launches.

With his mission a success, Baby returns to Baby Corp and becomes CEO. However, Tim and Baby soon realize they miss each other deeply, and Tim invites him back, saying that he wants him back as his brother. Baby returns as a regular baby named Theodore "Ted" Lindsey Templeton, realizing love is something that grows, instead of being divided. Years later, an adult Tim tells the story to his daughter, who is surprised to learn that her new baby sister is also an employee of Baby Corp.

== Voice cast ==
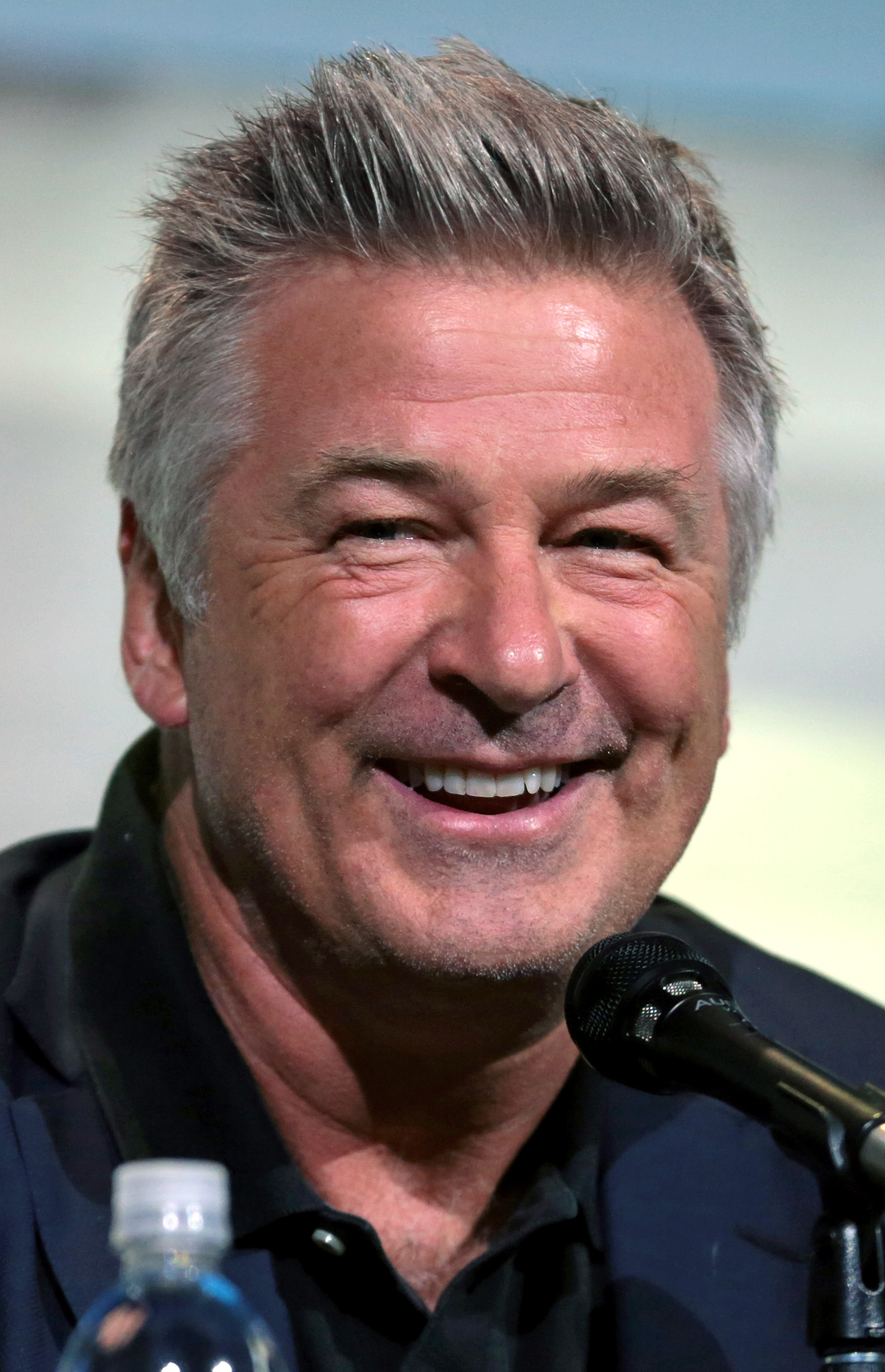
Alec Baldwin promoting the film at the 2016 San Diego Comic-Con.

- Miles Bakshi as Timothy Leslie "Tim" Templeton, Ted Jr.'s 7½-year-old brother.
  - Tobey Maguire as Adult Tim, the narrator.
- Alec Baldwin as Theodore Lindsay "Ted" Templeton Jr./The Boss Baby, an infant with the mind of an adult, who works as a Baby Corp executive and gains his intelligence and speaking ability from drinking a "Secret Baby Formula".
- Jimmy Kimmel as Theodore Lindsay "Ted" Templeton Sr., Janice's husband, the biological father of Tim, and the adoptive father of Ted Jr.
- Lisa Kudrow as Janice Templeton, Ted Sr.'s wife, the biological mother of Tim, and the adoptive mother of Ted Jr.
- Steve Buscemi as Francis E. Francis/Super Colossal Big Fat Boss Baby, the CEO of Puppy Co, the former CEO of BabyCorp and the Boss's nemesis
- Conrad Vernon as Eugene Francis, Francis's older brother and minion.
- James McGrath as Wizzie, Tim's Gandalf-esque alarm clock.
- David Soren as Jimbo
- Nina Zoe Bakshi as Tabitha Templeton, Tim's daughter.
- Tom McGrath as Julia Child (TV Chef)
- Walt Dohrn as Photographer
- James Ryan as Story Bear
- Eric Bell Jr. as The Triplets
- ViviAnn Yee as Staci
- Edie Mirman as the Big Boss Baby, Boss Baby's boss.
- James McGrath and Joseph Izzo as Elvis impersonators
- Chris Miller as Captain Ross

== Production ==
Upon reading the original book on which the film is based, McGrath felt a connection to it, as he had an older brother and felt like "the boss baby of the family". In keeping with that theme he stated, in an interview with Den of Geek, that "My personal goal with this was to watch this movie with my brother, and to see how it affected him!", which resulted in McGrath's brother being moved to tears by the completed film.

The look of the film was inspired by design techniques popularized in the 1960s, as well as animated films from both the 1950s and 1960s. This was due to McGrath's belief that contemporary animated films focused too much on realism. To help his staff McGrath would play the opening scene of Lady and the Tramp (1955) for new hires specifically noting that the film "should be easy on the eyes and really lead your eye to what's important in the shot."

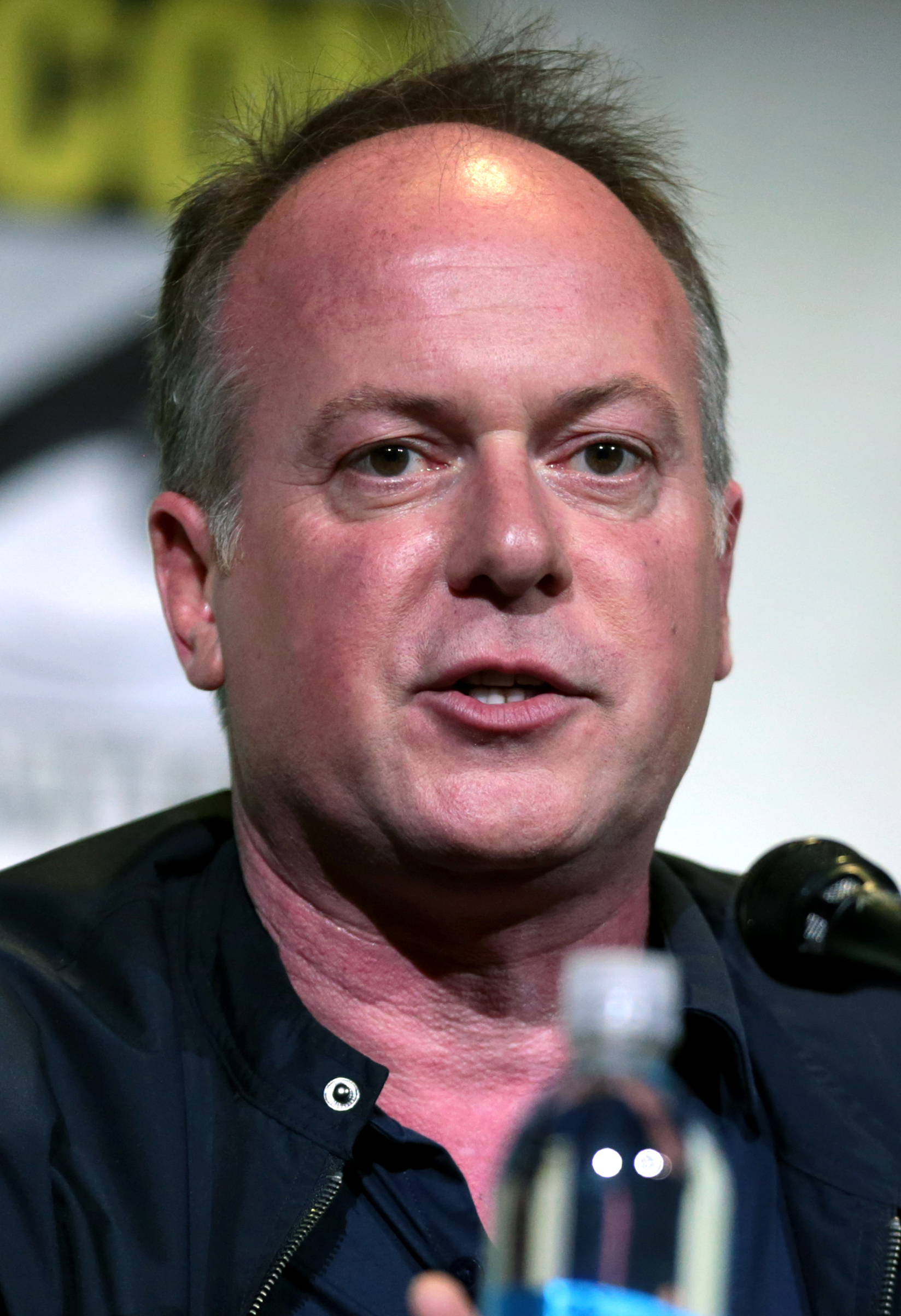
Director Tom McGrath at the 2016 San Diego Comic-Con

In September 2014, Alec Baldwin and Kevin Spacey joined the cast of the film, with further casting news announced in June 2016, including Steve Buscemi replacing Spacey. Baldwin previously worked with DreamWorks Animation as the voice of Makunga in 2008's Madagascar: Escape 2 Africa, which was also directed by McGrath, as well as the voice of Nicholas St. North/Santa Claus in 2012's Rise of the Guardians.

Miles Bakshi, son of DreamWorks Animation producer Gina Shay and grandson of the film director Ralph Bakshi, known for directing animated films such as Fritz the Cat, provided the voice of 7-year old Tim. Having been often present at DreamWorks, McGrath initially asked Bakshi only to provide a temporary voice for Tim to see if the character "worked". The producers listened to 30 to 40 children to choose the scratch voice. McGrath explained their decision: "No one sounded as authentic as Miles did. A lot of child actors are great, but they are over-articulate for their age. Miles was just natural and charming. He had a little slur to his voice at the time and it was very endearing." Three years later, Miles was told that he got the part. Bakshi was 10 when he began recording the voice. During the long process, his voice started to change and "by the end it got pretty tough", according to Bakshi, who was 14 when the film was released. He had to get his voice "very soft, but when I got that perfect tone it was great."

== Music ==
The film was scored by Hans Zimmer and Steve Mazzaro, Jacob Collier, and various artists. It marks Zimmer's fifth collaboration with Tom McGrath after the Madagascar trilogy (2005–2012) and Megamind (2010), and his 12th overall film he scored for DreamWorks Animation, which includes The Prince of Egypt (1998), The Road to El Dorado (2000), Spirit: Stallion of the Cimarron (2002), Shark Tale (2004), and the first three Kung Fu Panda films (2008–2016). The film's soundtrack was released on Back Lot Music & iTunes. "Blackbird" by The Beatles is used as part of the plot at various points throughout the film. During the end credits, Missi Hale recorded a cover of the Burt Bacharach song "What the World Needs Now Is Love" (first performed by Jackie DeShannon). "My House" by Flo Rida is also used in the trailer for the film.

== Release ==
=== Theatrical ===
The Boss Baby was initially scheduled for release on March 18, 2016, however, another DreamWorks Animation film, Kung Fu Panda 3, initially took over its release date to avoid competition with Star Wars: The Force Awakens, pushing the film back to March 31, 2017. The film premiered at the Miami Film Festival on March 12, 2017, and was released in the United States on March 31, 2017, by 20th Century Fox. The film was later released in Japan on March 21, 2018, by DreamWorks Animation's sister company Universal Pictures, following parent company NBCUniversal's 2016 acquisition of DreamWorks Animation. The Japanese release is accompanied by the DreamWorks animated short Bird Karma.

=== Home media ===
20th Century Fox Home Entertainment released The Boss Baby for digital download on July 4, 2017, and on DVD, Blu-ray, Blu-ray 3D and Ultra HD Blu-ray on July 25. Physical copies contain a short film, The Boss Baby and Tim's Treasure Hunt Through Time. The film was also released in a 2-movie pack alongside its sequel The Boss Baby: Family Business on DVD and Blu-ray by Universal Pictures Home Entertainment in 2021.

== Reception ==
=== Box office ===
The Boss Baby grossed $175 million in the United States and Canada and $353 million in other territories, for a worldwide total of $528 million.

The film was released with Ghost in the Shell (which was produced by DreamWorks Animation's former parent company) and The Zookeeper's Wife on March 31, 2017. The Boss Baby grossed $15.5 million on its first day, including $1.5 million from Thursday night previews. The film then earned $50 million from 3,773 theaters during its opening weekend. Its second weekend earnings dropped by 47% to $26.3 million, and followed by another $15.9 million the third weekend. The Boss Baby completed its theatrical run in the United States and Canada on November 2, 2017.

=== Critical response ===
The Boss Baby has an approval rating of 53% on the review aggregator website Rotten Tomatoes, based on 178 reviews, with an average rating of 5.5/10. Its critical consensus reads, "The Boss Baby's talented cast, glimmers of wit, and flashes of visual inventiveness can't make up for a thin premise and a disappointing willingness to settle for doody jokes." Metacritic (which uses a weighted average) assigned The Boss Baby a score of 50 out of 100 based on 32 critics, indicating "mixed or average reviews". Audiences polled by CinemaScore gave the film an average grade of "A−" on an A+ to F scale.

Neil Genzlinger of The New York Times praised Baldwin and the adult humor, saying: "The contrast between the helpless-infant stage of life and corporate-speak is funny but fairly high-concept for a kiddie movie, and the plot grows denser as it goes along and the baby and Tim reluctantly join forces to stop a conspiracy by which puppies would corner all the love in the world." Peter Hartlaub of San Francisco Chronicle stated that "it doesn't help that there are strong similarities with Sony's equally disorganized yet superior 2016 film Storks. Both films work off the same premise — that humans don't bear live young." Pete Hammond of Deadline Hollywood gave the film a scoring of 3 out of 5, calling it "a funny and frenetic animated comedy which is blessed to have Alec Baldwin calling the shots as this little bundle of power who looks he should be running Exxon Mobil, not sucking his thumb."

=== Accolades ===
Accolades received by The Boss Baby
Award	Date of ceremony	Category	Recipient(s)	Result	Ref.
Academy Awards	March 4, 2018	Best Animated Feature	Tom McGrath and Ramsey Ann Naito	Nominated	
Annie Awards	February 3, 2018	Best Animated Feature	The Boss Baby	Nominated	
Annie Awards	February 3, 2018	Outstanding Achievement for Character Animation in a Feature Production	Bryce McGovern	Nominated	
Annie Awards	February 3, 2018	Outstanding Achievement for Character Animation in a Feature Production	Rani Naamani	Nominated	
Annie Awards	February 3, 2018	Outstanding Achievement for Character Design in a Feature Production	Joe Moshier	Nominated	
Annie Awards	February 3, 2018	Outstanding Achievement for Directing in an Animated Feature Production	Tom McGrath	Nominated	
Annie Awards	February 3, 2018	Outstanding Achievement for Storyboarding in an Animated Feature Production	Glenn Harmon	Nominated	
Florida Film Critics Circle Awards	December 23, 2017	Best Animated Film	The Boss Baby	Nominated	
Golden Globe Awards	January 7, 2018	Best Animated Feature Film	The Boss Baby	Nominated	
Golden Trailer Awards	June 6, 2017	Best Original Score TV Spot (for a Feature Film)	"Boss Boss Baby" (The Refinery)	Nominated	
Hollywood Music in Media Awards	November 17, 2017	Best Original Score in an Animated Film	Hans Zimmer and Steve Mazzaro	Nominated	
Movieguide Awards	February 2, 2018	Best Movies for Families	The Boss Baby	Won	
Producers Guild of America Awards	January 20, 2018	Best Animated Motion Picture	Ramsey Ann Naito	Nominated	
San Diego Film Critics Society Awards	December 11, 2017	Best Animated Film	The Boss Baby	Nominated	
Satellite Awards	February 10, 2018	Best Animated or Mixed Media Feature	The Boss Baby	Nominated	
Saturn Awards	June 27, 2018	Best Animated Film	The Boss Baby	Nominated	
Visual Effects Society Awards	February 13, 2018	Outstanding Animated Character in an Animated Feature	Alec Baldwin, Carlos Puertolas, Rani Naamani, and Joe Moshier for "Boss Baby"	Nominated	
Visual Effects Society Awards	February 13, 2018	Outstanding Effects Simulations in an Animated Feature	Mitul Patel, Gaurav Mathus, and Venkatesh Kongathi	Nominated	

=== Academic scholarship ===
In 2021, interest in the original film was renewed when a philosophical symposium dedicated to the film was announced. While the announcement was widely believed to be a prank at first, organizers Jaime McCaffrey and Tore Levander insisted this was not the case. Responding to the early criticism, McCaffrey stated to The A. V. Club that "Its messaging, the way that it tries to convey ideas, you almost can't discern what the position of the movie is. And all the artistic decisions in the movie seem to be [in] conflict with each other in such a way that as a viewer you are like 'I don't know what I'm supposed to feel and therefore I must analyze.'"

The first conference was done virtually and featured speakers from Northeastern University, Middlesex University, the University of York, Cambridge University, and a medical doctor from the University of California Riverside. JP Karliak, the TV show's voice actor, and Brandon Sawyer, writer and executive producer of The Boss Baby: Back in Business, both spoke at the event. The "Second First Annual" conference was hosted in January 2023.

== Franchise ==
=== Sequel ===
On May 25, 2017, Universal Pictures and DreamWorks Animation announced a sequel, with a scheduled release for March 26, 2021, with Alec Baldwin reprising his role. On May 17, 2019, it was announced that Tom McGrath would return as director and Jeff Hermann, who produced Bilby, Bird Karma, and Marooned, would produce the sequel. Hans Zimmer and Steve Mazzaro returned to write the music for the film. On September 28, 2020, the film was pushed back to September 17, 2021, as a result of the COVID-19 pandemic, however on May 24, 2021, the film was moved up to a July 2, 2021 release through theaters and on Peacock for 60 days through paid tiers.

=== Television series ===
On December 12, 2017, both Netflix and DreamWorks Animation announced the release of the TV series based on the film. The Boss Baby: Back in Business was released in 2018.
