= J. P. Karliak =

American actor (born 1980 or 1981)

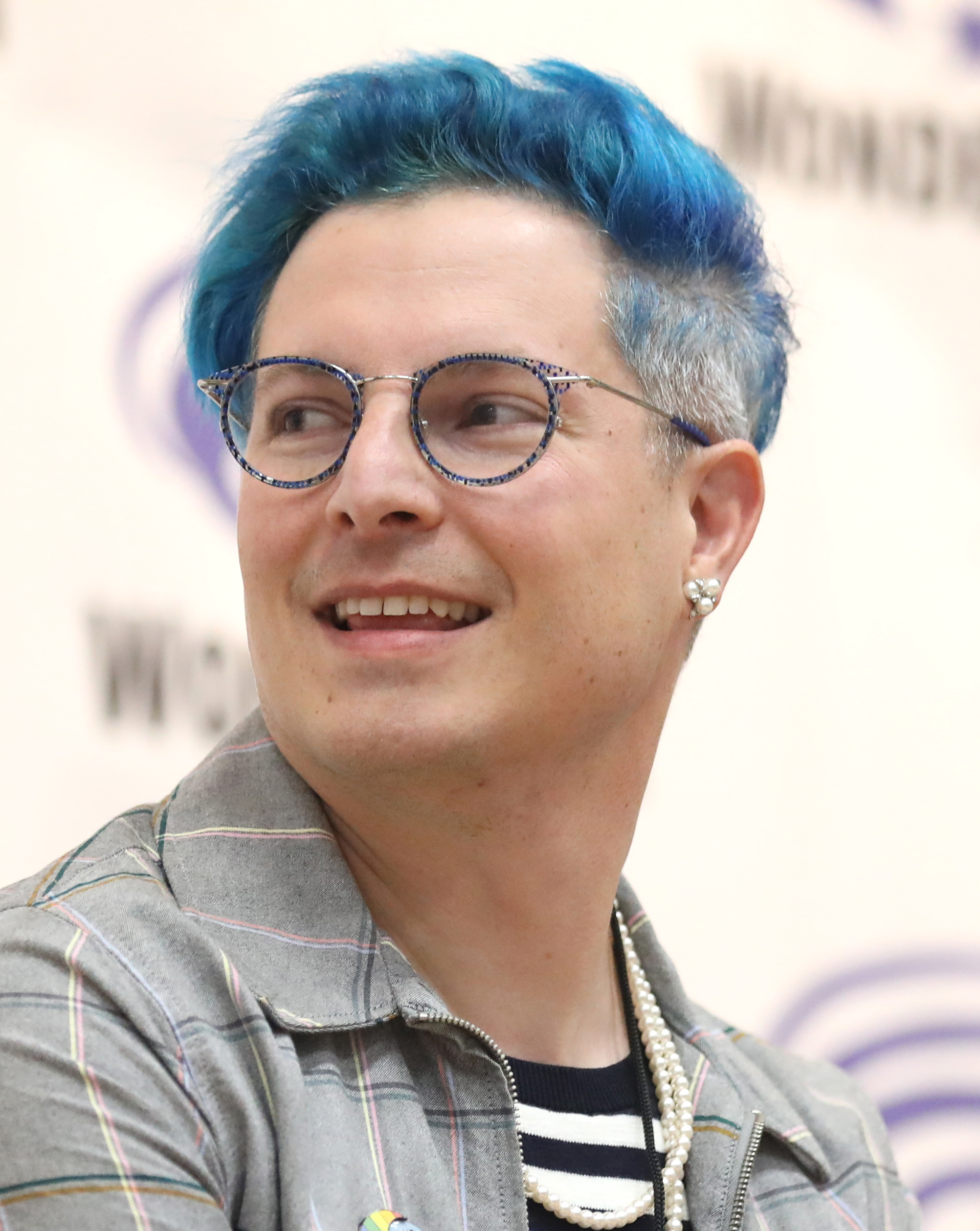
- Karliak at the 2024 WonderCon
- Born: John Paul Karliak; 1980 or 1981 (age 44–45); Dunmore, Pennsylvania
- Occupations: Actor; comedian
- Years active: 2007–present
- Spouse: Scott Barnhardt (m. 2022)

John Paul Karliak (born 1980 or 1981) is an American actor and comedian. He is known for his voice acting as Morph in the television series X-Men '97, Wile E. Coyote in the television series New Looney Tunes, Wolfgang in the video game series Skylanders, and Gargamel and Razamel in the 2025 Smurfs film.

== Early life ==
J. P. Karliak was born in 1980 or 1981 in Dunmore, Pennsylvania. He graduated with a bachelor's degree in theatre from University of Southern California.

== Career ==
He took a voice over class taught by Bob Bergen. In 2008, Karliak made his voice-acting debut in the video game Tom Clancy's EndWar as an unnamed character and others. Karliak also appears physically on-screen in live-action television series, such as Ringer and Real Husbands of Hollywood.

In 2014, he voiced Wolfgang in the video game Skylanders: Trap Team, a role he reprised in Skylanders: SuperChargers and Skylanders: Imaginators in 2015 and 2016, respectively. In 2015, he voiced Wile E. Coyote in the Cartoon Network/Warner Bros. Pictures animated television series New Looney Tunes until its cancellation in 2020. In 2016, he provided the voice of Reese in the animated feature film Batman: The Killing Joke, featuring Kevin Conroy and Mark Hamill. In 2017, he voiced Willy Wonka in the Tom and Jerry direct-to-video animated film Tom and Jerry: Willy Wonka and the Chocolate Factory.

Starting from 2018, Karliak voiced the Boss Baby in The Boss Baby: Back in Business, a Netflix television series based on Marla Frazee's book The Boss Baby and Tom McGrath's 2017 animated film of the same name. He then proceeded to reprise his role in the sequel series The Boss Baby: Back in the Crib, which had aired on May 19, 2022.

In the 2020 video game Crash Bandicoot 4: It's About Time, he provided the voice of Doctor Nefarious Tropy.

In 2021, he provided the English voice of S566 in the Netflix animated television series Eden, and provided the voice of Green Goblin in the Disney Junior animated television series Spidey and His Amazing Friends.

In February 2023, Karliak guest voiced Babwa Venomor, a Trandoshan mercenary leader, who works for the Empire, in Star Wars: The Bad Batch.

== Personal life ==
Karliak is genderqueer. In July 2022, Karliak married his husband Scott Barnhardt. Karliak lives in Los Angeles.

== Filmography ==
=== Film ===
Year	Title	Role	Notes
2009	Premarital Six	Delivery Boy	Short film Credited as John Paul Karliak
2009	Little Black Dress	Kevin	Short film Credited as John Paul Karliak
2010	Dante's Inferno: An Animated Epic	The Avenger (voice)	Direct-to-video
2010	L.T.D.	John Paul	Short film Credited as John Paul Karliak
2011	Retirement Press Conference	Orlando Martinez	Short film
2014	The Marvel Experience	Vision (voice)	
2015	Lego Marvel Super Heroes: Avengers Reassembled	Baron Strucker, Vision (voice)	
2016	Holiday in	Easter	Short film
2016	Batman: The Killing Joke	Reese (voice)	
2017	Tom and Jerry: Willy Wonka and the Chocolate Factory	Willy Wonka (voice)	
2018	Patty	Keith Jordan (voice)	Direct-to-video
2018	Dorothy's Christmas in Oz	Tin Man (voice)	Short film
2019	Neon Genesis Evangelion: Death & Rebirth	Kouzou Fuyutsuki (voice)	Netflix version
2019	Neon Genesis Evangelion: The End of Evangelion	Kouzou Fuyutsuki (voice)	Netflix version
2019	Millennium Actress	Scarface (voice)	English version
2019	The Secret Life of Pets 2	Additional voices	
2020	The Boss Baby: Get That Baby!	Boss Baby Theodore Lindsey "Ted" Templeton, Jr. (voice)	Short film
2021	Mobile Suit Gundam: Hathaway	Geise H. Hugest (voice)	Netflix version
2021	Fate/Grand Order The Movie: Divine Realm of the Round Table: Camelot Wandering; Agateram	Gawain (voice)	English version
2021	The Witcher: Nightmare of the Wolf	Additional voices	
2021	Sing 2	Additional voices	
2022	Minions: The Rise of Gru	Additional voices	
2022	The Boss Baby: Christmas Bonus	Boss Baby Theodore Lindsey "Ted" Templeton, Jr.	
2024	No Time to Spy: A Loud House Movie	Additional voices	
2025	Smurfs	Gargamel, Razamel (voice)	
2026	The Super Mario Galaxy Movie	Additional voices	

=== Television ===
Year	Title	Role	Notes
2011	Ringer	Party Planner	Credited as John Paul Karliak; Episode: "She's Ruining Everything"
2013	Real Husbands of Hollywood	Telegram Guy	Episode: "Backstabbers"; Credited as John Paul Karliak
2013	Hulk and the Agents of S.M.A.S.H.	Doc Samson (voice)	Episode: "The Skaar Whisperer"
2015	Funsplosion	Himself	Episode: "Kid Accountant"
2015–16	Sanjay and Craig	Puppet, Civilian No. 1, Heavenly Voice	17 episodes
2015–20	New Looney Tunes	Wile E. Coyote, various voices	17 episodes
2016	Star vs. the Forces of Evil	Naysaya (voice)	Episode: "Naysaya"
2016–19	The Stinky & Dirty Show	Linus, Lifty (voice)	6 episodes
2017	Home: Adventures with Tip & Oh	Boopy (voice)	Episode: "The Cloud/Booverty"
2017–20	Dorothy and the Wizard of Oz	Tin Man, Nome King, various voices	75 episodes
2018–21	Castlevania	Additional voices	9 episodes
2018–20	The Boss Baby: Back in Business	Boss Baby Theodore Lindsey "Ted" Templeton, Jr., Worker Baby Chip (voice)	Main cast
2018	Trolls: The Beat Goes On!	Pistil Patrick (voice)	Episode: "Three Trolls-keteers/The Helper"
2019	Neon Genesis Evangelion	Kouzou Fuyutsuki (voice)	Netflix version
2019	Costume Quest	Ruben, Caterpillar	2 episodes
2020	The Valhalla Murders	Arnar (voice)	English version
2020	Lego City Adventures		2 episodes
2020–21	Bless the Harts	Gene, Another Man (voice)	5 episodes
2020–22	Trolls: TrollsTopia	Dante Crescendo, Caruthers (voice)	Main cast
2020–24	Looney Tunes Cartoons	Additional voices	
2021	The Loud House	Vic McGillicuddy, Samuel (voice)	3 episodes
2021	Archibald's Next Big Thing Is Here!	Mr. Hackensack (voice)	Episode: "Robo-Family/The Phantom of Pointy Peak!"
2021	Eden	S566 (voice)	English dub
2021–22	Madagascar: A Little Wild	Todd (voice)	Recurring role
2021–22	Q-Force	Andrew (voice)	Episodes: "Greyscale" and "The Hole"
2021–22	Dogs in Space	Happy, Barclay, Bucky, Luke, various voices	Recurring role
2021–22	Star Wars: Visions	Trandoshan, additional voices	English version 5 episodes
2021–26	Rugrats	Additional voices	
2021–present	Spidey and His Amazing Friends	Green Goblin, additional voices	
2022–23	The Boss Baby: Back in the Crib	Boss Baby Theodore Lindsey "Ted" Templeton, Jr. (voice)	Main cast
2022–25	Baby Shark's Big Show!	Scoop, Flowbot 3000, additional voices	Recurring cast
2022	Fate/Grand Carnival	Gawain (voice)	English dub
2023	Star Wars: The Bad Batch	Babwa Venomor (voice)	Episode: "Tribe"
2023–25	Tiny Toons Looniversity	Merlin the Magic Mouse, Ralph Duck, additional voices	Recurring cast
2024	Pupstruction	Adult Cat (voice)	Episode: "Pizza-struction/Baby Builders"
2024	Family Guy	Additional voices	Episode: "Teacher's Heavy Pet"
2024	The Fairly OddParents: A New Wish	Dale Dimmadome (voice)	Recurring cast
2024–present	Grimsburg	Funsville Guy, Trix Rabbit, additional voices	Recurring cast
2024–present	X-Men '97	Morph, William Stryker, Hulk (voice)	Main cast
2024–26	Rock Paper Scissors	Convenient News Reporter, additional voices	Recurring cast
2024–25	The Tiny Chef Show	Argentinosaurus, Stegosaurus, Triceratops, additional voices	Recurring cast
2024–25	Ranma ½	Kīchi	English dub
2025	The Mighty Nein	Lord Sharpe, Jobe, Innkeeper	Recurring cast
2026	Star Wars: Visions Presents – The Ninth Jedi	Gramps	English version

=== Video games ===
Year	Title	Voice role	Notes
2008	Tom Clancy's EndWar	Additional voices	Credited as John Paul Karliak
2008	Aion	Additional voices	Credited as John Paul Karliak
2010	H.A.W.X. 2	Additional voices	Credited as John Paul Karliak
2013	Marvel Heroes	Iron Fist	Non-playable character
2014	Skylanders: Trap Team	Wolfgang	
2015	Disney Infinity 3.0	Bailey	
2015	Skylanders SuperChargers	Wolfgang	
2016	Lego Marvel's Avengers	Wiccan	
2016	Marvel Avengers Academy	Vision, Wiccan, J.A.R.V.I.S.	
2016	World of Final Fantasy	Shivalry	English version
2016	Skylanders Imaginators	Wolfgang, Sal	
2018	Lego DC Super-Villains	Adam Strange, Music Meister, Plastic Man, Creeper	
2018	Red Dead Redemption 2	The Local Pedestrian Population	
2019	Kingdom Hearts III	Additional voices	
2020	Final Fantasy VII Remake	Additional voices	English version
2020	Pixel Ripped 1995	Greg	
2020	Exos Heroes	Zeon	English version
2020	The Last of Us Part II	Additional voices	
2020	Star Wars: Squadrons	Pilot	
2020	Crash Bandicoot 4: It's About Time	Doctor Nefarious Tropy	
2020	Spider-Man: Miles Morales	Additional voices	
2021	Ratchet & Clank: Rift Apart	Junk Bot, Nefarious Troopers, additional voices	
2021	Halo Infinite	Additional voices	
2022	Star Ocean: The Divine Force	Neyan Khezal	
2023	Star Trek: Resurgence	Chovak	
2023	Spider-Man 2	Additional voices	
2024	Suicide Squad: Kill the Justice League	The Joker	
2024	Final Fantasy VII Rebirth	Additional voices	
2025	Date Everything!	Stepford	
2025	Game of Thrones: Kingsroad	Jaime Lannister	
