= Lynnor Bontigao =

Filipino writer

Lynnor Bontigao is a Filipino-born author and illustrator of children's books.

== Biography ==
Bontigao, born in the Philippines, moved to the United States and, when she could not find an art-related job, worked in finance in New York City.

In 2020, Bontigao won the inaugural Tomie dePaola Professional Development Award from the Society of Children’s Book Writers.

She is known for featuring diversity in the characters of her books.

Bontiago illustrated Cindy Wang Brandt's You Are Revolutionary (2021). The International Examiner wrote positively of Bontigao's illustrations. A Publishers Weekly review said, "Bontigao’s bright, approachable illustrations trace a parallel narrative of children of varying abilities, ages, religions, and skin tones".

Kirkus Reviews wrote positively of Bontigao's illustrations in The World's Best Class Plant (2023).

Her first book as both author and illustrator, Sari-Sari Summers (2023), was described as a "gentle, spare narrative" with "softly textured illustrations" by Kirkus Reviews.

She lives in New Jersey.

== Selected works ==
=== As illustrator ===
- Villanueva, Justine. Jack & Agyu. Sawaga River Press, 2019. ISBN 9780996829717.
- Brandt, Cindy Wang. You Are Revolutionary. Beaming Books, 2021. ISBN 978-1-5064-7830-2.
- Scanlon, Liz Garton & Audrey Vernick. The World's Best Class Plant. Putnam, 2023. ISBN 9780525516354.

=== As author and illustrator ===
- Sari-Sari Summers. Candlewick Press, 2023. ISBN 9781536226140.
