= Elizabeth Garton Scanlon =

American writer

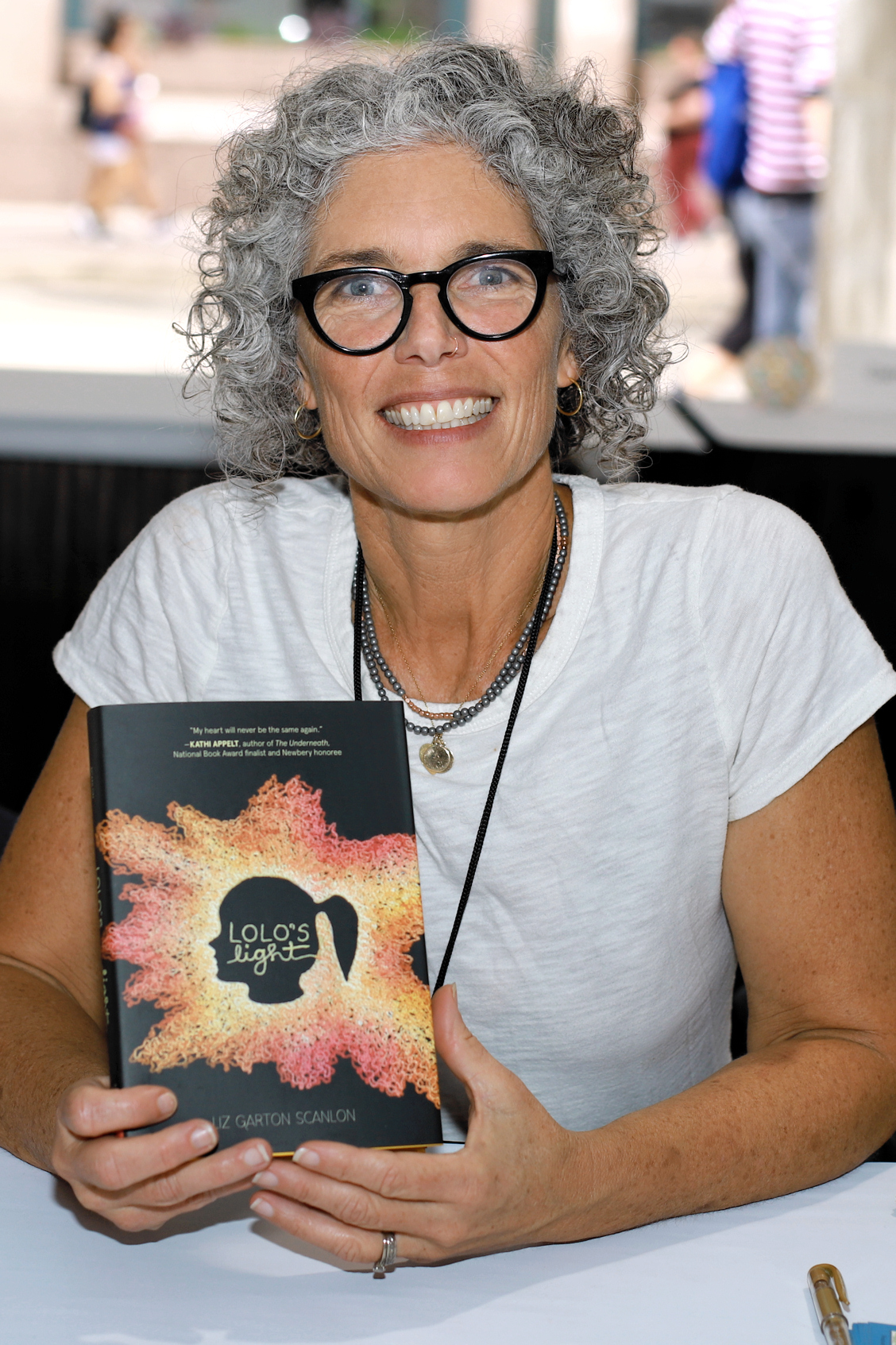
Scanlon at the 2022 Texas Book Festival.

Elizabeth "Liz" Garton Scanlon is an American writer of children's books, primarily picture books in collaboration with other illustrators.

== Career ==
Elizabeth Garton grew up in Vail, Colorado and later moved to Wisconsin. Her undergraduate degree was in English and her graduate was in Creative Writing. After helping her daughter put on socks she got the idea for her first book, A Sock Is A Pocket for Your Toes (2004). Five years later in September 2009, her second book All the World was published. It was illustrated by Marla Frazee, and won the Caldecott Award in 2010. In March 2011, Scanlon's third book, illustrated by Arthur Howard, Noodle and Lou, a story following a pair of unlikely friends, a bird and a worm, was released. Following Noodle and Lou came another children's book, Think Big, which is a "lyrical celebration of imagination and creativity in many child-friendly forms – painting, writing, acting, cooking, dancing and more, was illustrated by Vanessa Newton and published by Bloomsbury in Summer 2012." Happy Birthday, Bunny! was released in January 2013 and was illustrated by Stephanie Graegin. Scanlon is also reported to publish another children's book titled The Good- Pie Party, which is set to be illustrated by Kady MacDonald Denton and released in 2014.

== Personal life ==
Before writing full-time she composed corporate communications.

== Selected works ==
- A Sock is A Pocket for Your Toes (HarperCollins, 2004)
- All the World (Beach Lane Books/Simon & Schuster, 2009)
- Noodle and Lou (Beach Lane, 2011)
- Think Big (Bloomsbury, 2012)
- Happy Birthday, Bunny (Beach Lane, 2013)
- The Good- Pie Party (Arthur A. Levine Books/Scholastic, 2014)
- The Great Good Summer (Beach Lane Books/Simon & Schuster, 2015)
- Kate, who Tamed the Wind. Illustrated by Lee White. (Schwartz & Wade, 2018)
- One Dark Bird. Illustrated by Frann Preston-Gannon. (Beach Lane, 2019)
- The World's Best Class Plant. With Audrey Vernick. Illustrated by Lynnor Bontigao. (Putnam, 2023)

== Books reception ==
- A Sock is A Pocket for Your Toes - Kirkus Reviews finds "In bubbly verse and playful imagery reminiscent of Mary Ann Hoberman's classic A House Is a House For Me..."
- All The World - Kirkus Reviews sees "At once a lullaby and an invigorating love song to nature, families and interconnectedness."
- Noodle and Lou - Kirkus Reviews believes that readers "...will enjoy this brisk, rhyming tale of solid support and relentless esteem-building." and that this story is "Chirpy, instructive and fun. "
- Think Big - Kirkus Reviews states that "Scanlon’s spare rhyming text bursts with gusto."
- Happy Birthday, Bunny! - Kirkus Reviews finds that "Scanlon delivers a sweet, rhyming text..." and concludes "Happy birthday to a splendid book for new birthday boys and girls."
- The Good-Pie Party - Kirkus Reviews believes "Scanlon’s gentle, child’s-eye view of a common challenge hits the right notes..."
- "The Great Good Summer" - Kirkus Reviews sees "Equal parts peculiar and poignant, Ivy’s story will have readers giggling as they root for her to find everything she’s looking for"
