= That Kookoory! =

1995 book by Margaret Walden Froehlich

That Kookoory! is a 1995 children's book written by Margaret Walden Froehlich and illustrated by Marla Frazee. It was published by Harcourt.

In the book, a rooster named Kookory is supposed to come with Babsy, Grampy Spindleshanks, and Mrs. Parsley to the Edgerton Fair, at night, he runs ahead of them after waking then up at nighttime; Kookory thinks he is looking at the sun, but instead he sees the moon. During the book, he evades a weasel chasing after him.

Reviewer Ann A. Flowers describes Kookory as "a charmer". Stephanie Loer, the editor for children's books at the Boston Globe, wrote that the main character is "ebullient". In regards to the antagonist, Loer described him as "tenacious".

The book is set in the rural United States. Publishers Weekly stated that the work has an "old-fashioned tone".

The pictures use pen and ink. The background has a sandy color. The books were made from paper that was recycled.

== Reception ==
Jane Langton, in The New York Times, wrote that the text is "artificially poetical"; she argued that the quality of the artwork is so high that "Margaret Walden Froelich's words don't really matter".

Martha Topol of Northwestern Michigan College wrote in School Library Journal that the drawings "flash out the characters and enhance the country setting".

Loer wrote that the artwork has "a luminous, magical feeling", that it is "Meticulously detailed" and that it is "a perfect complement to the story."

Publishers Weekly stated that the storyline is "somewhat tepid" and that the vocabulary "may be beyond the intended audience." The publication also stated that the drawing style "is an unqualified success."

Flowers stated the text is "gentle and affectionate" and that it works well with the images.
