= The Seven Silly Eaters =

1997 book by Mary Ann Hoberman and Marla Frazee

The Seven Silly Eaters is a 1997 children's book written by Mary Ann Hoberman and illustrated by Marla Frazee. It is publisher by Harcourt.

In the book, there are seven children who are picky about what food they eat, which causes frustration for their mother, Mrs. Peters. Each child has different things they like, so Mrs. Peters has to prepare different foods for each child. At the end of the story, the children agree they like cake and will only eat cake.

Jon Agee, in The New York Times, describes the story as "spun like a Seussian fable".

The illustrations use both ink and pen. Kirkus Reviews stated that they have "a touch of Hilary Knight's chaos". According to Agee, the text is "in an up-tempo, whimsical rhyme."

Publishers Weekly stated that the drawings are "chaotically busy" and align with the words.

== Reception ==
Agee stated that the work is "riotous".

Publishers Weekly called the book "deft and funny".

Malcolm Jones, in Newsweek, stated that the illustration work was "whimsical".

== Video adaptation ==
There was a video adaptation, issued by the Nutmeg Media in 2005, where the author read from her book. Reviewer Nancy McCray, in Booklist, called the work "captivating". School Library Journal stated that the video can be used as entertainment or to teach nutrition.
