= Audrey Vernick =

American picture book author

Audrey Vernick is an American children's book author whose works include many featuring lesser-known figures in baseball history, including Larry Doby, Edith Houghton, Effa Manley, Max Patkin, and the Acerra brothers.

== Selected works ==
- Scanlon, Liz Garton & Audrey Vernick. The World's Best Class Plant. Putnam, 2023. Illustrated by Lynnor Bontigao. ISBN 9780525516354.

== Awards ==
- California Young Reader Medal (2015 for Brothers at Bat, illustrated by Steven Salerno)
- Amelia Bloomer Book (2017, for The Kid From Diamond Street)
