= Harriet, You'll Drive Me Wild! =

Book by Mem Fox illustrated by Marla Frazee

- Author: Mem Fox
- Illustrator: Marla Frazee
- Language: English
- Genre: Children's picture book
- Published: 2000 (Hodder Children's)/ Harcourt, Inc. (United States)
- Publication place: Australia
- Media type: Print (hardback)
- Pages: 30 (unpaginated)
- ISBN: 9780733613128
- OCLC: 988929205

Harriet, You'll Drive Me Wild! is a 2000 children's picture book written by Mem Fox and illustrated by Marla Frazee. It is about a young girl, Harriet, who tries her mother's patience.

== Reception ==
A reviewer in the New York Times wrote "as always, Fox writes with a light touch" and called the illustrations "delicate", while Common Sense Media found it a "simple story (that) isn't quite right for (its) target audience". The Horn Book Magazine wrote: "A most successful team effort that is welcome for its acceptance of both a child's penchant for trouble and a parent's occasional outbursts-both happen, "just like that", and both will be forgiven".

Harriet, You'll Drive Me Wild! has also been reviewed by Kirkus Reviews, Publishers Weekly, Booklist, School Library Journal, and Library Talk Reviews.

It received a Parents' Choice Award silver honor
