= Ariana Greenblatt =

American actress (born 2007)

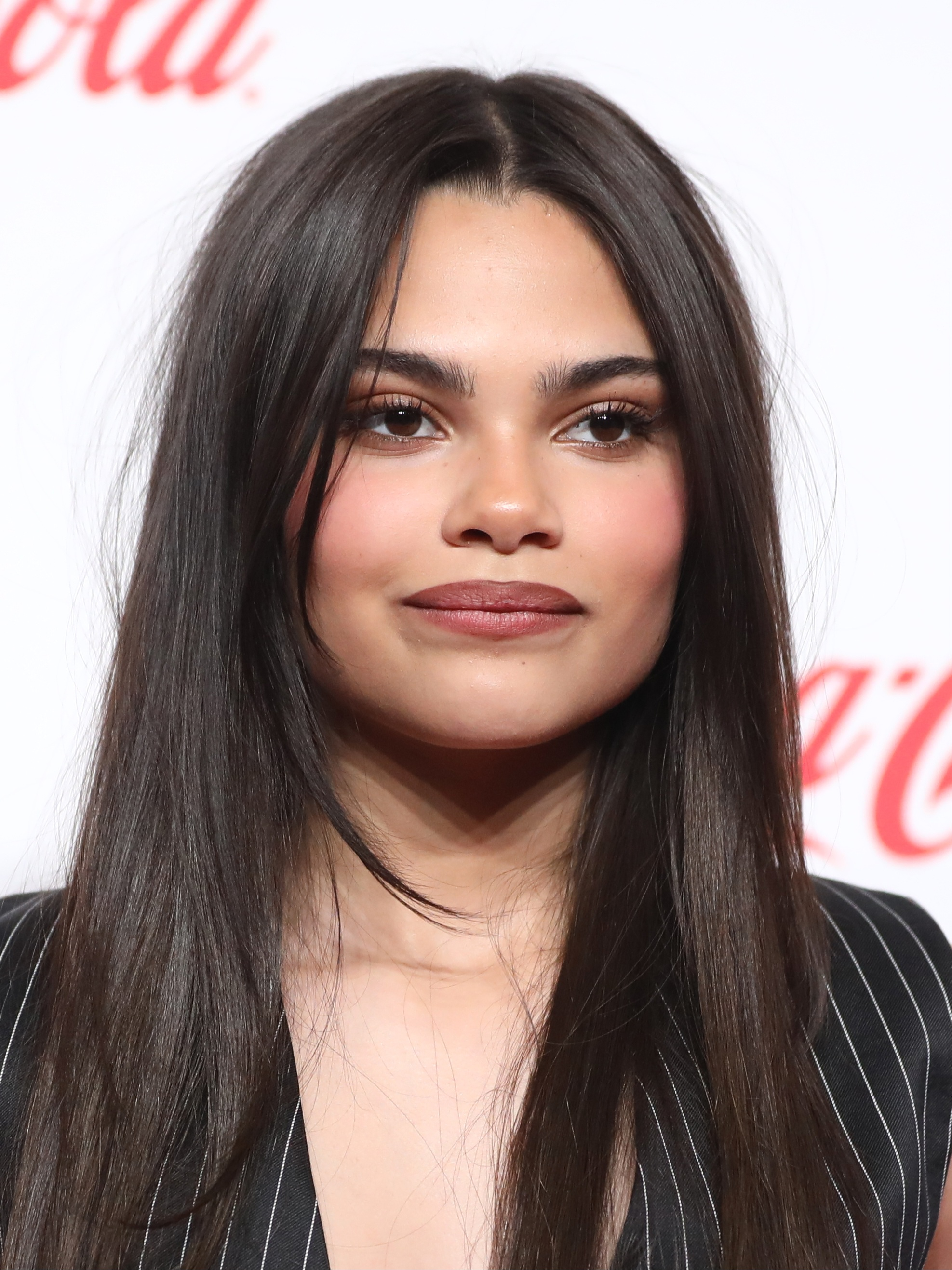
- Greenblatt in 2024
- Born: August 27, 2007 (age 19); New York City, U.S.
- Occupation: Actress
- Years active: 2015–present

Ariana Greenblatt (born August 27, 2007) is an American actress. Her first starring role was in the Disney Channel comedy series Stuck in the Middle (2016–2018). Other early roles included the comedy film A Bad Moms Christmas (2017), the Marvel film Avengers: Infinity War (2018), and the musical film In the Heights (2021). She rose to greater prominence with the science-fiction film 65, the comedy film Barbie, and the space opera television series Ahsoka, which were all released in 2023. For her role in Barbie, she received nominations at the Critics' Choice and Screen Actors Guild Awards.

== Early life ==
Born in New York City on August 27, 2007, Greenblatt grew up there and in Parkland, Florida. She comes from an entertainment background; her father, Shon Greenblatt, is a Jewish actor, and her paternal grandparents are Broadway producers. Her mother, Solimar "Soli" (née Colón), is a former professional ballerina from Puerto Rico.

== Career ==
In 2016, Greenblatt began her career as a child actress when she was cast in a starring role in the Disney Channel sitcom Stuck in the Middle playing Daphne, the youngest child in the Diaz family. Her first film role was Lori in A Bad Moms Christmas in 2017. In 2018, Greenblatt played a young Gamora in Avengers: Infinity War. She subsequently appeared in the films In the Heights, The One and Only Ivan, and Love and Monsters.

In 2020, Greenblatt voiced a young Velma Dinkley in Scoob!, and in 2021, she voiced Tim's eldest daughter Tabitha in The Boss Baby: Family Business, a role which she would reprise in The Boss Baby: Back in the Crib. In 2023, Greenblatt starred as Koa in the science fiction thriller film 65, and appeared as Sasha in the Barbie film and as young Ahsoka Tano in the Ahsoka series on Disney+. In-between 65 and Barbie, Greenblatt worked in Borderlands, a feature film adaptation of the video game of the same name, as Tiny Tina. The movie wound up released after both in 2024.

In 2025, Greenblatt starred in Fear Street: Prom Queen and Now You See Me: Now You Don't.

== Filmography ==
Key
†	Denotes productions that have not yet been released

=== Film ===
Year	Title	Role	Notes	Ref.
2017	A Bad Moms Christmas	Lori Harkness		
2018	Avengers: Infinity War	Young Gamora		
2020	Scoob!	Young Velma Dinkley (voice)		
2020	The One and Only Ivan	Julia		
2020	Love and Monsters	Minnow		
2021	In the Heights	Young Nina Rosario		
2021	Awake	Matilda Adams		
2021	The Boss Baby: Family Business	Tabitha Templeton (voice)		
2023	65	Koa		
2023	Barbie	Sasha		
2024	Borderlands	Tiny Tina		
2025	Fear Street: Prom Queen	Christy Renault		
2025	Now You See Me: Now You Don't	June Rouclere		
TBA	Somedays †	TBA	Post-production	
TBA	Rubber Hut †	TBA	Post-production	
TBA	Egg Baby †	TBA	Filming	
TBA	Little Five †	TBA	Post-production	

=== Television ===
Year	Title	Role	Notes
2015	Liv and Maddie	Raina	Episode: "Joy-to-a-Rooney"
2016–2018	Stuck in the Middle	Daphne Diaz	Main role
2018	Dancing with the Stars: Juniors	Herself	Contestant; one of the three runners-up
2022–2023	The Boss Baby: Back in the Crib	Tabitha Templeton (voice)	Main role (season 1); recurring (season 2)
2023–present	Star Wars: Ahsoka	Young Ahsoka Tano	Episode: "Part Five: Shadow Warrior"
2024	Secret Level	Ana Spelunky (voice)	Episode: "Spelunky: Tally"

== Awards and nominations ==
Year	Association	Category	Nominated work	Result	Ref.
2021	Hollywood Music in Media Awards	Best Original Song in an Animated Film	"Together We Stand"	Nominated	
2023	Las Vegas Film Critics Society Awards	Youth in Film – Female	Barbie	Nominated	
2023	Washington D.C. Area Film Critics Association	Best Youth Performance	Barbie	Nominated	
2024	Critics' Choice Movie Awards	Best Young Actor/Actress	Barbie	Nominated	
2024	Music City Film Critics Association	Best Young Actress	Barbie	Nominated	
2024	Screen Actors Guild Awards	Outstanding Performance by a Cast in a Motion Picture	Barbie	Nominated	
2024	Seattle Film Critics Society	Best Youth Performance	Barbie	Nominated	
2024	Big Screen Achievement Awards	Rising Star of the Year	Herself	Won	
