= A Couple of Boys Have the Best Week Ever =

Book by Marla Frazee

- Front cover, designed by Marla Frazee
- Author: Marla Frazee
- Illustrator: Marla Frazee
- Language: English
- Genre: Children's literature, picture book
- Published: 2008
- Publisher: Harcourt, Inc.
- Publication place: United States
- Pages: 30
- ISBN: 978-0152060206

A Couple of Boys Have the Best Week Ever is a children’s picture book written and illustrated by Marla Frazee and set in Malibu, California. It tells the story of two boys named James and Eamon, who go to a nature camp for a week and stay with Eamon's unique grandparents. The story relates the growth of a friendship between two boys enjoying a week away from parents. In 2009, the book was named a Caldecott Honor Book.

== Plot ==
The story begins with a boy named Eamon, who is staying at his grandparents’ house in Malibu, California. for a week while he attends a day camp. His friend James also gets to come and stay with his grandparents. When they first arrive at the house, Eamon's grandfather Bill asks the two boys if they want to go to the penguin exhibition, happening at the museum. The boys decline as they both wish to play inside together. The next morning the two boys set off to their first day at Nature Camp, after their first day they realized that Nature Camp may not be what they anticipated.

Throughout the first night, the two boys eat banana waffles, jump on a mattress, and play. Before they are about to leave for day two of camp, Bill gives both of them a pair of binoculars and things to find with them. As the week progresses so does Eamon's and James' friendship, it is even possible that the two friends become one person. The grandparents gave them the nickname “Jamon.” Each day Bill asks Jamon to keep thinking about going to the penguin exhibition, but the boys decline the offer. They want to say and do what any other boy would do, eat and play video games.

When the week of camp was over, the boys and grandparents decide to sit together and have a popcorn party. But the grandparents both fell asleep on the couch. Jamon decide to go outside and look at the view. When the night has risen the two boys come up with the idea to build their own penguin exhibition as a surprise. It ends up being their favorite part of the whole trip, and it is the best surprise for the grandparents. When their mothers arrive at the grandparents’ house they say thanks, give them a hug, and waddle like penguins to the car.

== Production ==
A Couple of Boys Have the Best Week Ever was inspired by the friendship of Marla Frazee's youngest son and the son of her editor. The two boys stayed at the editor's parents' house in Malibu for a week while attending a nature day camp. After the boys returned, the editor suggested writing a thank-you note to the grandparents in the form of a book. Taking that advice, Frazee created a short book, asked the boys to illustrate it, and sent it off. The editor, having seen the thank-you note, encouraged her to turn it into a full picture book for publication, which she was finally inspired to do when her oldest son happened to read it. According to Frazee, “He was just cracking up, and he handed it back and said, 'That’s hilarious, you should do something with that.'” After twenty-five revisions and ten dummies, A Couple of Boys Have the Best Week Ever was produced and published.

== Reception ==
Reviews were positive. A review in Horn Book stated “in this tongue-in-cheek story, Frazee's text plays straight man to her comic illustrations, and the clever interplay between the two fuels the book's humor.”

== Awards ==
- Boston Globe/Horn Book Honor Award for Picture Book (2008)
- a Publishers Weekly Best Book of the Year (2008)
- a Kirkus Reviews Best Book of the Year
- Delaware Diamond Award Winner
- Caldecott Honor Book (2009)
