= The Boss Baby: Family Business =

2021 animated film by Tom McGrath

- Theatrical release poster
- Directed by: Tom McGrath
- Screenplay by: Michael McCullers
- Story by: Tom McGrath; Michael McCullers
- Based on: The Boss Baby and The Bossier Baby by Marla Frazee
- Produced by: Jeff Hermann
- Starring: Alec Baldwin; James Marsden; Amy Sedaris; Ariana Greenblatt; Jeff Goldblum; Eva Longoria; Jimmy Kimmel; Lisa Kudrow
- Edited by: Mary Blee; Mark A. Hester
- Music by: Hans Zimmer; Steve Mazzaro
- Production company: DreamWorks Animation
- Distributed by: Universal Pictures
- Release date: July 2, 2021
- Running time: 107 minutes
- Country: United States
- Language: English
- Budget: $82 million
- Box office: $146.8 million

The Boss Baby: Family Business (known in some territories as The Boss Baby 2) is a 2021 American animated comedy film produced by DreamWorks Animation. Loosely based on the picture books The Boss Baby and The Bossier Baby by Marla Frazee, it is the second installment in The Boss Baby franchise, and the sequel to The Boss Baby (2017). The film was directed by Tom McGrath and written by Michael McCullers. It stars the voices of Amy Sedaris, Ariana Greenblatt, Jeff Goldblum, Eva Longoria. Alec Baldwin, Jimmy Kimmel, and Lisa Kudrow reprise their roles from the first film, and James Marsden replaces Tobey Maguire. The film follows the adult Templeton brothers as they are brought back together after Tim's daughter Tina requests their help for Baby Corp to stop a professor from erasing childhoods worldwide.

Plans for a Boss Baby sequel were announced in May 2017 with McGrath returning to direct. Animation began at DWA Glendale, and some production assets were borrowed from Jellyfish Pictures, with voice acting being done remotely due to the COVID-19 pandemic.

The film was theatrically released in the United States on July 2, 2021, by Universal Pictures, and was also available on paid tiers of Peacock for 60 days. The film received negative reviews from critics and grossed $146.8 million against an $82 million budget.

== Plot ==
Tim Templeton is now an adult and lives with his wife Carol and their two daughters, 7-year-old Tabitha and baby Tina. Tim's younger brother Ted is a successful CEO and is always absent. One night, Tim discovers that Tina comes from Baby Corp, just as Ted did, (Note: As depicted in The Boss Baby (2017)) and that she has been assigned for a "special mission" that requires Ted's presence. Tim refuses to call Ted, saying that he will never come, until Tina leaves a fake voicemail for Ted, luring him to the Templetons' house.

The next morning, Ted arrives, and Tim explains to him that Tina is a Baby Corp dispatch. Tina introduces the brothers to a new formula that will allow them to turn back into children for 48 hours to infiltrate Tabitha's school and figure out what Dr. Erwin Armstrong, founder and principal of the Acorn Center for Advanced Childhood, is planning behind parents' backs.

At the school, Tim, now as his seven-year-old self, follows Tabitha to her class while baby Ted is placed with other babies. Ted rallies the babies to help him leave the playroom so that he can go to Armstrong's office to investigate. Tim tries to be sent to the principal's office by disrupting class, but is instead put in "The Box" for timeout. Ted discovers that Armstrong is actually a baby himself with his robot suit, having run away from home after realizing that he was smarter than his parents and now makes money by creating popular phone apps. His ultimate plan is to eliminate every parent on B-Day, so that they cannot tell their children what to do anymore.

On the night of a holiday pageant, where Tabitha is supposed to sing a solo, the brothers and Tina plan to expose Armstrong. However, they learn that B-Day is set to happen that night through Armstrong's new app, QT-Snap, which will hypnotize the parents into mindless zombies. Both Tim and Ted are caught by Armstrong's ninja babies and are put in The Box, which slowly starts to fill with water. Tabitha performs her solo, but when she sees that Tim has not shown up, she runs off the stage crying. She is consoled by Tina, who reveals her identity and her mission. Tabitha agrees to help her younger sister by reaching the server and shutting down QT-Snap before it can go worldwide. Tim and Ted escape from The Box with the help of Tabitha's pet pony Precious.

Tim and Ted reach the server first, but they are stopped by Armstrong, who calls the zombie parents for backup. While the brothers hold them back as the formula starts to wear off, Tina and Tabitha reach the server. Tabitha can hack in and pull up the shutdown screen, but is interrupted by Armstrong. The sisters then set off a candy lava volcano using Mentos and soda, destroying the servers and turning all parents back to normal. Tina then reveals that bringing Tim and Ted back together was her true mission. The whole Templeton family gathers to celebrate Christmas, while Armstrong returns to his own family.

== Voice cast ==
- James Marsden as Tim Templeton, Ted Jr.'s older brother, Carol's husband, Tina and Tabitha's father, and Ted Sr. and Janice's older son. Marsden replaces Tobey Maguire and Miles Bakshi from the first film, where Maguire voiced the adult Tim and Bakshi voiced the younger Tim, Marsden voices both in this film.
- Alec Baldwin as Ted Templeton Jr. / The Boss Baby, an ex-executive of Baby Corp, Tim's younger brother, Tina and Tabitha's uncle, Carol's brother-in-law, and Ted Sr. and Janice's younger son
- Amy Sedaris as Tina Templeton, an undercover and new executive of Baby Corp, Tim and Carol's younger daughter, Tabitha's younger sister, Ted's younger niece, and Ted Sr. and Janice's younger granddaughter
- Ariana Greenblatt as Tabitha Templeton, Tina's older sister, Tim and Carol's highly intelligent older daughter, Ted's older niece, and Ted Sr. and Janice's older granddaughter. Greenblatt replaces Nina Zoe Bakshi from the first film
- Jeff Goldblum as Dr. Erwin Armstrong, a cruel but intelligent baby with a plot to remove all grownups
- Eva Longoria as Carol Templeton, Tim's wife, Ted Jr.'s sister-in-law, Ted Sr. and Janice's daughter-in-law, and Tina and Tabitha's mother
- Jimmy Kimmel as Ted Templeton Sr., Janice's husband, Ted Jr. and Tim's father, Carol's father-in-law, and Tina and Tabitha's paternal grandfather
- Lisa Kudrow as Janice Templeton, Ted Sr.'s wife, Ted Jr. and Tim's mother, Carol's mother-in-law, and Tina and Tabitha's paternal grandmother
- James McGrath as Wizzie, Tim's Gandalf-esque alarm clock from his childhood

Other supporting roles include David Soren reprising his role as Jimbo and Nicholas Gist voicing the Triplets, replacing Eric Bell Jr. from the first film.

== Production ==
=== Development ===
On May 25, 2017, Universal Pictures and DreamWorks Animation announced a sequel to the 2017 film The Boss Baby, with an initial release date for March 26, 2021, with Alec Baldwin reprising his titular role. On May 17, 2019, it was announced that Tom McGrath returned as director and Jeff Hermann, whose credits include Bilby, Bird Karma, and Marooned, replaced Ramsey Ann Naito as producer. On September 17, 2020, Jeff Goldblum, Ariana Greenblatt (replacing Nina Zoe Bakshi), Eva Longoria, James Marsden (replacing Tobey Maguire and Miles Bakshi), and Amy Sedaris joined the cast, alongside returning actors Jimmy Kimmel and Lisa Kudrow.

=== Animation ===
Portions of production were done remotely during the COVID-19 pandemic. While the animation for the film was done at DWA Glendale, Jellyfish Pictures, who worked on How to Train Your Dragon: Homecoming and Spirit Untamed, used its production assets for Family Business. It also marked the final DreamWorks Animation film to have HP as their preferred workstation partner. Starting with The Bad Guys (2022), Lenovo would be their preferred workstation partner.

=== Music ===
Hans Zimmer and Steve Mazzaro, who previously composed the score for the first film, returned for the sequel, while Jacob Collier wrote a cover of Cat Stevens' "If You Want to Sing Out, Sing Out". Songwriter Gary Barlow also contributed with a brand new song performed by Greenblatt called "Together We Stand". Other tracks from Hans Zimmer such as "Run Free" from Spirit: Stallion of the Cimarron and "Zoosters Breakout" from Madagascar were used in the film with the "Run Free" track used during the pony pursuit to Acorn Academy at a theater Tim and Ted break into. The "Global Warming Song" in the third act of the film was written by Zimmer and Mazzaro, along with Tom McGrath and Nelson Yokota, and produced by Mazzaro.

== Release ==
The Boss Baby: Family Business was initially scheduled for release on March 26, 2021, but was later delayed to September 17, initially taking over the release date of The Bad Guys, and finally July 2. These shifts were reportedly made in response to the COVID-19 pandemic. Its eventual shift enabled The Boss Baby: Family Business to be simultaneously released in theaters and on Peacock for 60 days through paid tiers.

According to Samba TV, 783,000 households streamed the film on Peacock over its opening weekend. By the end of its first thirty days, the film had been watched in an estimated 2 million households.

Universal Pictures Home Entertainment released The Boss Baby: Family Business for digital download on August 31, 2021, and on 4K Ultra HD Blu-ray, Blu-ray and DVD on September 14.

== Reception ==
=== Box office ===
The Boss Baby: Family Business grossed $57.3 million in the United States and Canada, and $89.5 million in other territories, for a worldwide total of $146.8 million.

The film was released with The Forever Purge on July 2, 2021, The Boss Baby: Family Business grossed $7.7 million on its first day, including $1.3 million from Thursday night previews. The film debuted at second grossing $17.3 million from 3,640 theaters. With the top three films at the box office, F9, Family Business, and The Forever Purge, all having been released by Universal, it marked the first time a single studio had done so since February 2005. Its second weekend earnings dropped by 47 percent to $8.7 million, and followed by another $4.7 million the third weekend.

=== Critical response ===
On the review aggregator website Rotten Tomatoes, the film holds an approval rating of 47% based on 101 reviews, with an average rating of 5.3/10. The website's critics consensus reads, "It's more C-level than C-suite, but as a painless diversion for the kids, this Boss Baby manages some decent Family Business." On Metacritic, the film has a weighted average score of 39 out of 100, based on 20 critics, indicating "generally unfavorable reviews", making it the lowest rated film from DreamWorks Animation on the platform. Audiences polled by CinemaScore gave the film an average grade of "A" on an A+ to F scale (an improvement over the first film's "A−"), while PostTrak reported 72% of audience members gave it a positive score, with 49% saying they would definitely recommend it.

Thomas Floyd of The Washington Post gave the film 2.5/4 stars, writing that "...there's a severe case of sequel-itis, as returning director Tom McGrath and screenwriter Michael McCullers go to farcical lengths to re-create the original movie's gags, story beats and character dynamics. Still, Family Business manages to largely improve on its predecessor, with the help of savvy casting and surprisingly pointed social satire." Writing for the Los Angeles Times, Michael Ordoña said: "It's more of the same, for better or worse, but likely with enough bells and whistles — especially those new characters — to please younger fans."

Writing for The A.V. Club, Katie Rife gave the film a "C+" grade and said: "...it's nothing to get worked up about, in part because this Boss Baby moves too quickly to inspire thought about much of anything. Compared to the first film, Family Business moves along at a swift and stimulating clip, with fewer diversions into world-building and hallucinatory internal logic." Carlos Aguilar of the TheWrap wrote: "Family Business offers an array of half-baked conflicts, all crying out to be noticed, while the creators are apparently unsure of which requires the most urgent attention."

=== Accolades ===
The Boss Baby: Family Business received a nomination for the Family Movie of 2021 at the 47th People's Choice Awards. It was nominated for the Kids' Choice Award for Favorite Animated Movie and the Alliance of Women Film Journalists' Time Waster Remake or Sequel Award. At the 2022 Golden Trailer Awards, Family Business's "Precious" (Ammo Creative) was nominated for Best Digital: Animation/Family. It was awarded the prize for Best Movie for Families at the 2022 MovieGuide Awards. "Together We Stand" (Barlow and Greenblatt) was nominated at the 12th Hollywood Music in Media Awards for Best Original Song in an Animated Film. The film placed one of the Top Box Office Films at the 2022 ASCAP Awards.

== Future ==
In June 2021, during a Q&A with Alec Baldwin and Amy Sedaris, a third Boss Baby film was announced to be in early development.
