= Tom McGrath (animator) =

American filmmaker

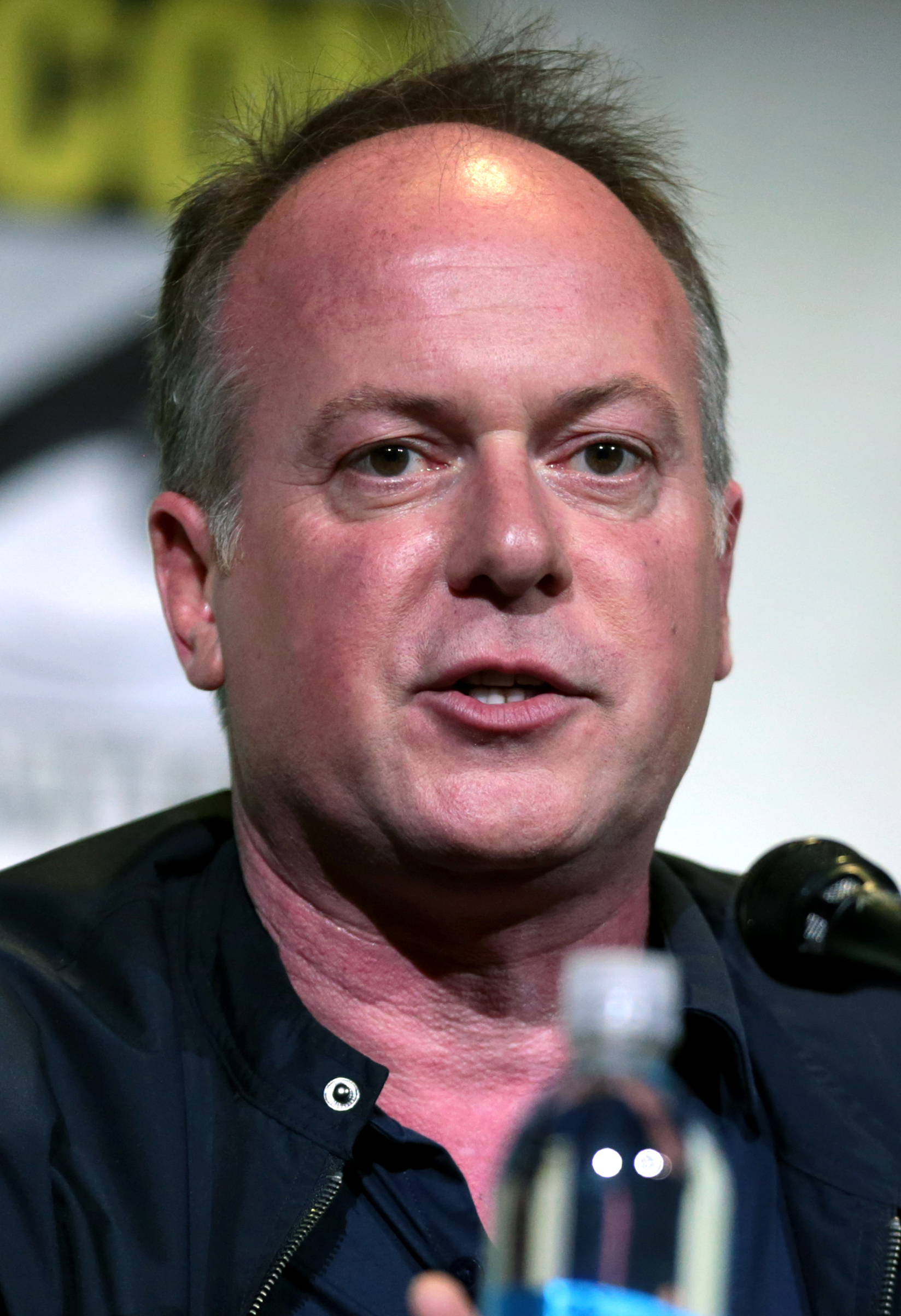
- McGrath at the 2016 San Diego Comic-Con
- Born: Thomas McGrath; Lynnwood, Washington, U.S.
- Occupations: Voice actor; animator
- Years active: 1988–present
- Employer: DreamWorks Animation
- Notable work: Madagascar; Megamind; The Boss Baby
- Spouse: Brieanne Cameron (m. 2017)

Thomas McGrath is an American voice actor, animator and filmmaker. He is known for the DreamWorks animated film Madagascar, which he co-wrote and directed with Eric Darnell while voicing the character of Skipper the Penguin. The film spawned two direct sequels, along with a spin-off animated series and film based on the penguins, with McGrath reprising his role as Skipper in all cases. McGrath also directed the DreamWorks animated films Megamind (2010) and The Boss Baby (2017), the latter of which received an Academy Award and Golden Globe Award nomination. McGrath returned as director for its 2021 sequel.

== Life and career ==
McGrath was born and raised in Lynnwood, Washington. He studied Industrial Design at the University of Washington and graduated from the Character Animation program at Cal Arts. McGrath's experience in both television and feature animation includes work as an animator on Cool World and Space Jam, storyboard artist and director for seasons 3-5 of The Ren & Stimpy Show.

McGrath made his film directing debut as the co-director and co-writer of Madagascar along with Eric Darnell, where he also voiced the leader of the squad of penguin characters, Skipper. He reprised his role as Skipper and co-directed and co-wrote the sequel, Madagascar: Escape 2 Africa, and co-directed Madagascar 3: Europe's Most Wanted. He worked on The Penguins of Madagascar, a spin-off TV series, as a creative consultant and as the voice of Skipper. He directed Megamind, released in November 2010.

In 2017, he directed The Boss Baby and the 2021 sequel The Boss Baby: Family Business.

== Filmography ==
=== Feature films ===
Year	Title	Director	Writer	Producer	Art / Animation department	Voice actor	Voice role	Notes
1992	Cool World	No	No	No	Yes	No		animation designer animator layout artist
1996	Space Jam	No	No	No	Yes	No		animator
1998	Hercules and Xena – The Animated Movie: The Battle for Mount Olympus	No	No	No	Yes	No		key animator layout artist
2000	How the Grinch Stole Christmas	No	No	No	Yes	No		storyboard artist
2001	Cats & Dogs	No	No	No	Yes	No		storyboard artist
2005	Madagascar	Yes	Yes	Yes	Yes	Yes	Skipper; Fossa; Panicky Man on Subway	co-directed with Eric Darnell co-written with Mark Burton, Billy Frolick and Eric Darnell
2006	Flushed Away	No	No	No	No	Yes	Action Figure; Artist	
2007	Shrek the Third	No	No	No	No	Yes	Gary	
2008	Madagascar: Escape 2 Africa	Yes	Yes	Yes	Yes	Yes	Skipper; Lemur	co-directed with Eric Darnell co-written with Etan Cohen and Eric Darnell
2009	Monsters vs. Aliens	No	No	No	Yes	Yes	Wilson	
2010	Megamind	Yes	No	Yes	No	Yes	Lord Scott; Prison Guard	
2011	Puss in Boots	No	No	No	No	Yes	Bar Thief	
2012	Madagascar 3: Europe's Most Wanted	Yes	No	No	No	Yes	Skipper; First Policeman	co-directed with Eric Darnell & Conrad Vernon
2014	Mr. Peabody & Sherman	No	Yes	No	No	Yes	Odysseus	
2014	Penguins of Madagascar	No	No	Yes	No	Yes	Skipper	executive producer
2017	The Boss Baby	Yes	No	No	No	Yes	TV Chef	
2021	The Boss Baby: Family Business	Yes	Yes	Yes	No	Yes	Dr. Tiffany Hamilton	executive producer Story co-written with Michael McCullers Writer of Global Warming Song co-written by Hans Zimmer, Steve Mazzaro and Nelson Yokota
2022	Paws of Fury: The Legend of Hank	No	No	No	No	Yes	Additional Voices	
2024	Kung Fu Panda 4	No	No	No	No	Yes	Croc Crime Boss	

=== Short films ===
Year	Title	Director	Writer	Art / Animation department	Actor	Role	Notes
1988	The Thing What Lurked in the Tub	No	No	Yes	No		monster animator
1988	Lea Press on Limbs	No	No	No	Yes	(voice)	
1993	The D.A.R.E. Report: The Land of Decisions and Choices	No	No	Yes	No		character layout
1995	The Louie N' Louie Show	Yes	No	Yes	No		storyboard artist
1999	Herd	No	No	No	Yes	Fed No. 5	live-action role
2001	Imp, Inc.	No	No	Yes	No		animation layout
2005	The Madagascar Penguins in a Christmas Caper	No	No	No	Yes	Skipper (voice)	
2009	Merry Madagascar	No	Yes	No	Yes	Skipper (voice); Additional voices	
2013	Madly Madagascar	No	No	No	Yes	Skipper (voice)	
2014	Almost Home	No	No	No	Yes	Jeff (voice)	

=== Television series ===
Year	Title	Director	Art Animation department	Creative consultant	Actor	Role	Notes
1993–1996	The Ren & Stimpy Show	Yes	Yes	No	No		Director (1 episode "I Was a Teenage Stimpy"); Layout artist (21 episodes); Background designer (14 episodes); Storyboard artist (10 episodes)
1996	KaBlam!	Yes	Yes	No	No		Director storyboard artist (segment "The Louie and Louie Show")
1998	Oh Yeah! Cartoons	No	Yes	No	No		Background designer (segment "A Cop and His Donut")
2008–2016	The Penguins of Madagascar	No	No	Yes	Yes	Skipper (voice)	88 episodes
2014	All Hail King Julien	No	No	Yes	No		

=== Video games ===
Year	Title	Role	Notes
2005	Madagascar	Skipper (voice)	Uncredited
2005	Madagascar: Animal Trivia DVD Game	Skipper (voice)	
2007	Shrek the Third	Skipper (voice)	
2008	Madagascar: Escape 2 Africa	Skipper (voice)	
2009	Madagascar Kartz	Skipper (voice)	
2011	The Penguins of Madagascar: Dr. Blowhole Returns – Again!	Skipper (voice)	
2011	Super Star Kartz	Skipper (voice)	
2012	Madagascar 3: The Video Game	Skipper (voice)	
