= Marla Frazee =

American writer and illustrator (born 1958)

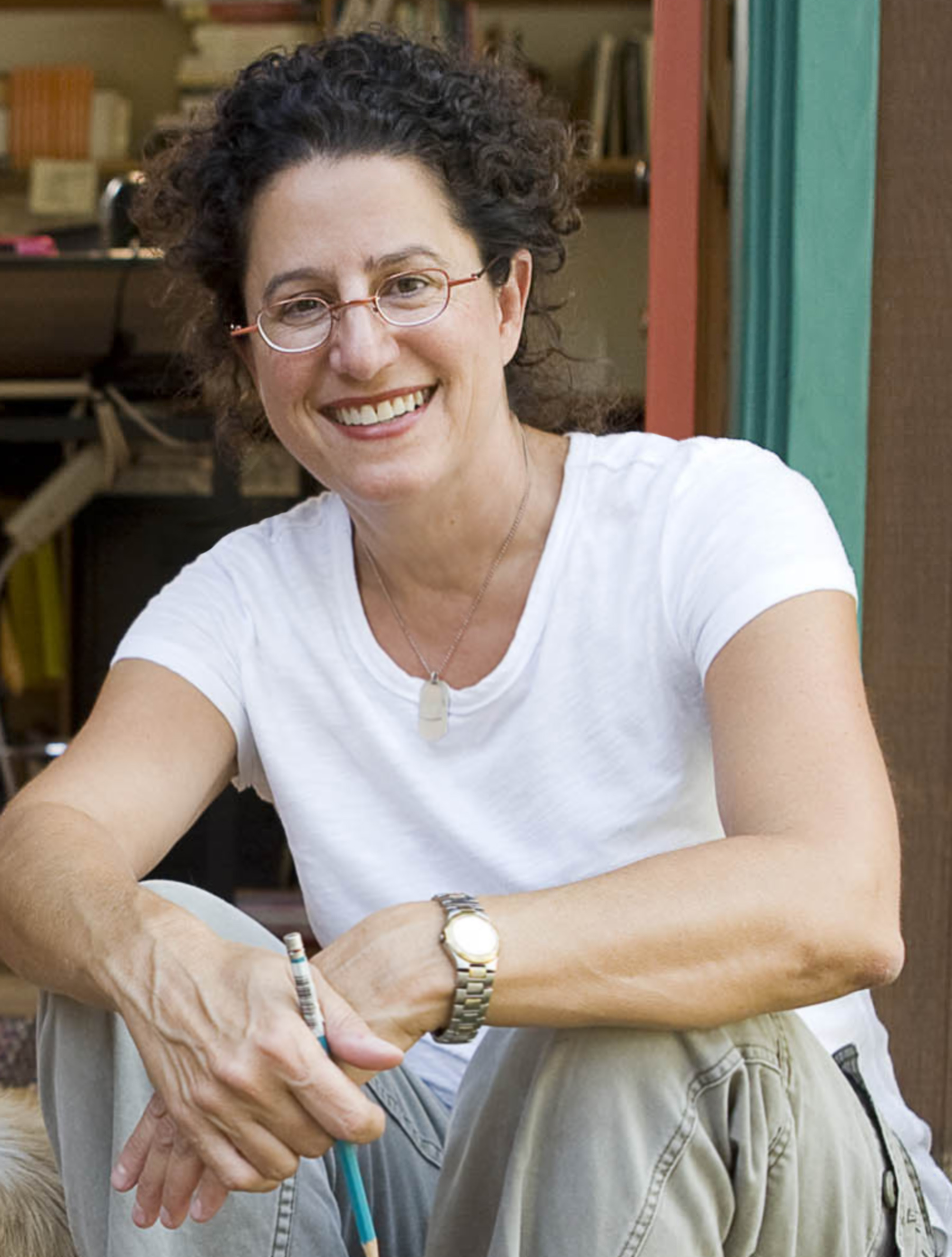
- Frazee in 2009
- Born: January 16, 1958 (age 68); Los Angeles, California, U.S.
- Occupations: Writer and illustrator
- Writing career
- Genre: Children's literature
- Notable works: A Couple of Boys Have the Best Week Ever, All the World, The Boss Baby
- Website: marlafrazee.com

Marla Frazee (born January 16, 1958) is an American author and illustrator of children's literature. She has received three Caldecott Honors for picture book illustration.

== Early life and college ==
Frazee was born in Los Angeles, California and moved to Glendale, California, during her childhood. She is of Lebanese descent. Frazee found her early inspiration in children's books such as Maurice Sendak's Where the Wild Things Are and Robert McCloskey's Blueberries for Sal. She illustrated her first book in third grade, which was called The Friendship Circle. After it won an award in a state fair competition, Frazee created a duplicate for her school library. It was Frazee's first book.

She attended college in the Greater Los Angeles Area, where she earned her bachelor of fine arts at Art Center College of Design and graduated in 1981. While attending school, Frazee met photographer Tim Bradley. The two married in 1982 and raised three sons: Graham, Reed and James. The marriage ended in divorce in 2013.

== Career ==
=== After college (1981–1990) ===
After graduating from college, Frazee worked for various companies in advertising, educational publishing, toys, games, and magazines. She did toy design with companies like Mattel, Milton Bradley, and Parker Brothers. Frazee made Happy Meal boxes for McDonald's and team characters for the National Football League.

=== World-Famous Muriel and the Magic Mystery and That Kookoory! (1990–1995) ===
In 1990 Frazee illustrated her first published book, World-Famous Muriel and the Magic Mystery, written by Sue Alexander. After Muriel, Frazee illustrated That Kookoory!, written by Margaret Walden Froehlich. She received positive reviews of her work in the Horn Book Magazine, a journal for children's literature and young-adult literature.

=== The Seven Silly Eaters (1997) ===
The release of The Seven Silly Eaters, written by Mary Ann Hoberman, marked a turning point in Frazee's career. The book revolves around a family with seven children, each of whom are extremely picky eaters. A review from the Horn Book called it, "A pleasure for parent and child." More positive reviews followed.

=== On the Morn of Mayfest – Mrs. Biddlebox (1998–2002) ===
Following the release of The Seven Silly Eaters, Frazee illustrated many books which increased her popularity. In 1998, Frazee illustrated On the Morn of Mayfest written by Erica Silverman. After the publication of On the Morn of Mayfest, Frazee's next book was Hush, Little Baby. Frazee illustrated the classic folk song in 1999. In 2000, Frazee illustrated a book written by Mem Fox. Harriet, You'll Drive Me Wild!, deals with Harriet, a little girl who does not mean to be pesky but cannot help but get in the way of her mother. They both do things they wish they had not, but their love for each other remains strong. Then in 2001, Frazee illustrated Everywhere Babies, a book written by Susan Meyers. The book tells babies all the ways their families love them, and the diverse community Frazee created is united by the love for their children. After Everywhere Babies, Frazee illustrated Linda Smith's text, Mrs. Biddlebox in 2002. Mrs. Biddlebox uses all the ingredients to her bad day (fog, dirt, and sky) to bake a delicious cake.

=== Roller Coaster (2003) ===
Frazee wrote her first book, Roller Coaster in 2003. The idea for the book was conceived during a family trip, during which Frazee's sons talked continuously about roller coasters. Roller Coaster became the first book both written and illustrated by Frazee. It follows a typical roller coaster ride and its passengers; a young girl apprehensive about the ride becomes the main character.

=== Clementine – All the World (2006–2009) ===
In 2006, Frazee illustrated Clementine, a series of chapter books written by Sara Pennypacker Frazee uses pen and ink drawings to make the story of an overly-active and imaginative third-grader come to life. More recently, Frazee wrote and illustrated A Couple of Boys Have the Best Week Ever. Loosely based upon the adventures of her son and his friend at a nature camp, Frazee captures the essence of summer vacation and what it means to children. Frazee earned her first Caldecott Honor for her illustrations in the book, although she wrote it as well. Following the publication of A Couple of Boys Have the Best Week Ever, Frazee illustrated All the World, a book written by Elizabeth Garton Scanlon. The book follows a family and their friends through the course of a day and ends with a festive gathering at night. For her beautiful illustrations and double page spreads, Frazee picked up another Caldecott Honor.

=== The Boss Baby (2010) ===
In Fall 2010, The Boss Baby, both written and illustrated by Frazee, was published. Frazee describes a young couple's newest arrival. The baby quickly takes over their lives with his nightly "meetings" and demands. The Boss Baby was met with positive reviews, with the Horn Book Magazine calling it "this year's baby-shower hit." In all, The Boss Baby garnered more than three starred reviews. DreamWorks Animation released an animated feature film loosely based on the book in March 2017, with a sequel released in July 2021. DreamWorks also released a Netflix show based on the book titled The Boss Baby: Back in Business.

== Awards ==
- Caldecott Honors for A Couple of Boys Have the Best Week Ever, All the World, and In Every Life
- Charlotte Zolotow Award in 2019 for Little Bear
- School Library Journal's Best Book of 2001
- Horn Book Fanfare
- Parenting Magazine Reading Magic Award
- Society of Children's Book Writer's and Illustrator's Golden Kite Award
- Children's Literature Council of Southern California's Excellence in Illustration Award

== Works ==
=== As illustrator ===
- World Famous Muriel and the Magic Mystery
  - The author is Sue Alexander. This is the third book about Alexander's character, Muriel. Bessie Egan of California State Library gave praise to the "whimsical, full-color illustrations" which she said had "vitality and humorous detail."
- That Kookoory!
- The Seven Silly Eaters
- Me and the Pumpkin Queen
- On the Morn of Mayfest
- Harriet, You'll Drive Me Wild!
- Everywhere Babies
- Mrs. Biddlebox
- New Baby Train
- Clementine Series
  - Clementine
  - The Talented Clementine
  - Clementine's Letter
- All the World
- Stars
- Hush Little Baby: A Folk Song with Pictures
  - Publishers Weekly stated that this book had "mixed results", citing the conflict between "hyped-up, caricatured figures" that can be "cartoonish" and "gloomy tones".
- The People in Pineapple Place – cover
- It Takes A Village: Picture Book

=== As writer and illustrator ===
- Roller Coaster
- Santa Claus, The World's Number One Toy Expert
- Walk On, A Guide for Babies of All Ages
- A Couple of Boys Have the Best Week Ever
- The Boss Baby
- The Bossier Baby
- The Farmer and the Clown
- Boot and Shoe
  - The eyes of the main characters, both dogs, are not visible. Kirkus Reviews stated that, despite that aspect, the work shows "painful and soothing depth". The final sentence of the review states, "Read unhurried, in a lap, again and again."
