= The Boss Baby (book) =

2010 picture book by Marla Frazee

- Author: Marla Frazee
- Language: English
- Publisher: Beach Lane
- Publication date: 2010

The Boss Baby is a 2010 picture book by Marla Frazee. The book and its sequel, The Bossier Baby, published in 2016, were published by Beach Lane/Simon & Schuster. The original book is the inspiration of the film The Boss Baby.

It depicts a new baby acting like a workplace boss and ordering parents around. The baby's onesie is similar to a suit worn by a business executive. It is intended to be a discussion point for older children who are gaining new, younger siblings.

Gillian Engberg, in Booklist, wrote that the book depicts "underlying truths about how a baby’s arrival changes a family."

== Reception ==
Writer Theresa L. Stowell wrote that the book "became popular as a gift for new parents because of its message."

=== Reviews ===
According to Stowell, the work was well-reviewed; according to Stowell, the "original approach to new parenting" and the "humor" were points highlighted in these reviews.

Engberg states that the book's words are "perfectly timed" and "deadpan". Engberg argued that while children may enjoy the book, she believed that aspects "feel targeted more toward weary parents than a picture-book audience."

Kirkus Reviews describes the book as "wry". The artwork uses a mix of gouache and pencil work. Publishers Weekly stated that the parents' clothing is akin to the 1950s in Western fashion, and that there is "sleek" decor that has a "funky, retro style".

Publishers Weekly gave the book a starred review. The review stated the book is "Clever and empathetic".

Jayne Damron of Farmington Community Library of Farmington, Michigan wrote in School Library Journal that both parents and children would enjoy the book, and that the work demonstrates "artistic genius" and "storytelling chops".

Roger Sutton of The Horn Book Magazine stated that the idea behind the book was "cute"; he gave it a positive review and said it was made in an "efficient and witty" style.

== Adaptation ==
The book was adapted into the film The Boss Baby.

== Sequel ==
Frazee wrote a 2016 sequel, The Bossier Baby. In this story, a baby girl supplants the boss baby, a toddler in this book. The boy is frustrated and uses desperate measures to get his parents' attention, but the girl reaches out to the boy and the two reconcile. Kirkus stated that the ending, which shows conflict, is typical of those of Frazee works.

The baby girl wears a onesie and pearls.

Kirkus Reviews describes the sequel's text, which uses "tongue-in-cheek corporatese", as "droll". The sequel also uses gouache and pencil, and Kirkus compared the style to that of Mad Men.

=== Reception of the sequel ===
Roger Sutton of The Horn Book gave the sequel a starred review. Lolly Gepson of Booklist also gave the book a starred review. Publishers Weekly also gave the book a starred review. The Kirkus review is also positive, with the final sentence being "Someone give Frazee a raise." Gay Lynn Van Vleck of Henrico County Public Library also gave a starred review in School Library Journal, and she wrote that the drawings were "comical".
