= Madagascar: Escape 2 Africa =

2008 film by Eric Darnell and Tom McGrath

- Theatrical release poster
- Directed by: Eric Darnell; Tom McGrath
- Written by: Etan Cohen; Eric Darnell; Tom McGrath
- Produced by: Mireille Soria; Mark Swift
- Starring: Ben Stiller; Chris Rock; David Schwimmer; Jada Pinkett Smith; Sacha Baron Cohen; Cedric the Entertainer; Andy Richter; Bernie Mac; Alec Baldwin; Sherri Shepherd; will.i.am
- Edited by: H. Lee Peterson
- Music by: Hans Zimmer; will.i.am
- Production companies: DreamWorks Animation (Note: The billing block in the poster and home media release is mistakenly credited as "DreamWorks SKG".); PDI/DreamWorks
- Distributed by: Paramount Pictures (Note: In July 2014, the film's distribution rights were purchased by DreamWorks Animation from Paramount Pictures and transferred to 20th Century Fox before reverting to Universal Pictures in 2018 following NBCUniversal's acquisition of DreamWorks Animation in 2016.)
- Release date: November 7, 2008
- Running time: 89 minutes
- Country: United States
- Language: English
- Budget: $150 million
- Box office: $604 million

Madagascar: Escape 2 Africa is a 2008 American animated comedy film directed by Eric Darnell and Tom McGrath and written by Etan Cohen, Darnell and McGrath. The second installment in the Madagascar film series, following the 2005 film, it was produced by DreamWorks Animation SKG and Pacific Data Images. Ben Stiller, Chris Rock, David Schwimmer, Jada Pinkett Smith, Sacha Baron Cohen, Cedric the Entertainer, and Andy Richter reprise their roles from the first film, joined by new cast members Bernie Mac, Alec Baldwin, Sherri Shepherd, and will.i.am. In the film, the main characters, a party of animals from the Central Park Zoo whose adventures have taken them to Madagascar find themselves in the East African savannas, where they meet others of their species and where Alex the lion reunites with his parents.

The film, like its predecessor, has a score composed by Hans Zimmer. Singer and cast member will.i.am additionally contributed five songs to the soundtrack.

Madagascar: Escape 2 Africa was released by Paramount Pictures in the United States on November 7, 2008. The film received generally positive reviews from critics, who praised its characters, humor and animation, while also considering it an improvement over its predecessor. It grossed $604 million on a $150 million budget, making it the sixth highest-grossing film of 2008. It was dedicated to Mac, who died before the film's release. A sequel, Madagascar 3: Europe's Most Wanted, was released in 2012.

== Plot ==
In Kenya, the alpha lion Zuba tries to teach his young son Alakay how to fight, but Alakay is more interested in dancing. Rival lion Makunga challenges Zuba for the title of alpha, but during their fight, Alakay is captured by poachers and put in a crate. Zuba gives chase and breaks the safety harness off of the crate containing Alakay, but is shot in the ear and incapacitated. The crate falls into the ocean and drifts to New York City, where Alakay is renamed Alex, grows up at the Central Park Zoo, and meets his lifelong best friends: Marty, Melman, and Gloria.

In the present day, following their adventure in Madagascar, (Note: As depicted in Madagascar (2005)) the zoo animals prepare to return to New York aboard a battered airplane piloted by the penguins, accompanied by King Julien, Maurice and Mort. The plane runs out of fuel and crash lands in continental Africa. The animals find themselves at a watering hole on a nature reserve, and are excited to meet others of their species. Alex is reunited with his parents and impresses them with tales of his status as "the king of New York". Marty fits in with a herd of other zebras who look and sound just like him. Melman, a hypochondriac, is distressed that the reserve has no doctors, so the other giraffes appoint him as their witch doctor. Seeking romance, Gloria attracts the attention of the smooth-talking hippo Moto Moto. Meanwhile, the penguins, Skipper, Kowalski, Rico and Private, set about repairing the plane, assisted by numerous chimpanzees recruited by Mason and Phil. They steal vehicles from humans on a safari and strip them for parts. Nana, a tough old woman who attacked Alex in Grand Central Terminal, takes charge of the stranded tourists and helps them survive in the wilderness for the time being.

The zoo animals' initial excitement however soon turns to disappointment. In a scheme to oust Zuba as alpha lion, Makunga insists that Alex complete a rite of passage which the latter mistakes for a talent contest. It is actually a fighting contest, and Makunga tricks him into choosing Teetsi, the strongest lion as his opponent, resulting in Alex's humiliating defeat. Despondent, Zuba relinquishes his title as alpha to Makunga, who banishes Alex from the watering hole. Meanwhile, Marty is dejected by the realization that the other zebras can do everything he can, believing himself to be no longer unique. Melman comes to believe that he is deathly ill and, having secretly loved Gloria for a long time, is saddened by her interest in Moto Moto. The four friends get into a heated argument with one another due to their predicaments. Gloria has a date with Moto Moto, but loses interest when she realizes he is only attracted to her because of her size. After a pep talk from Julien, Melman finally reveals his feelings for Gloria.

The next day, the animals panic when the watering hole dries up. Determined to redeem himself, Alex mends his friendship with Marty and they leave the reserve to investigate upriver. Julien suggests that offering a sacrifice to the nearby volcano will restore the water. Melman, forlorn and believing he is dying, volunteers to be sacrificed. Gloria stops him from jumping into the volcano, and realizes that he loves her for more than her appearance. Alex and Marty discover that the stranded humans have built a camp and dammed up the river, and Alex is captured by them. Zuba rushes to his aid, but Alex saves them both by dancing for the humans, who remember him fondly from the zoo. Marty, Melman, Gloria, the penguins, and the chimpanzees arrive in the repaired airplane and help Alex and Zuba destroy the dam, restoring the water. Makunga angrily makes a stand for control, but Alex tricks him into being subdued by Nana, forcing him out of power. Zuba offers Alex the title of alpha lion, but he declines, believing the title belongs to his father. Zuba claims the title belongs to them both, and father and son become co-leaders.

Skipper marries a bobblehead doll he salvaged from the plane, and he, the other penguins, and the chimpanzees head off to a honeymoon in Monte Carlo. (Note: As depicted in Madagascar 3: Europe's Most Wanted (2012)) As for the quartet and the lemurs, they happily decide to stay on the reserve for a while.

== Voice cast ==
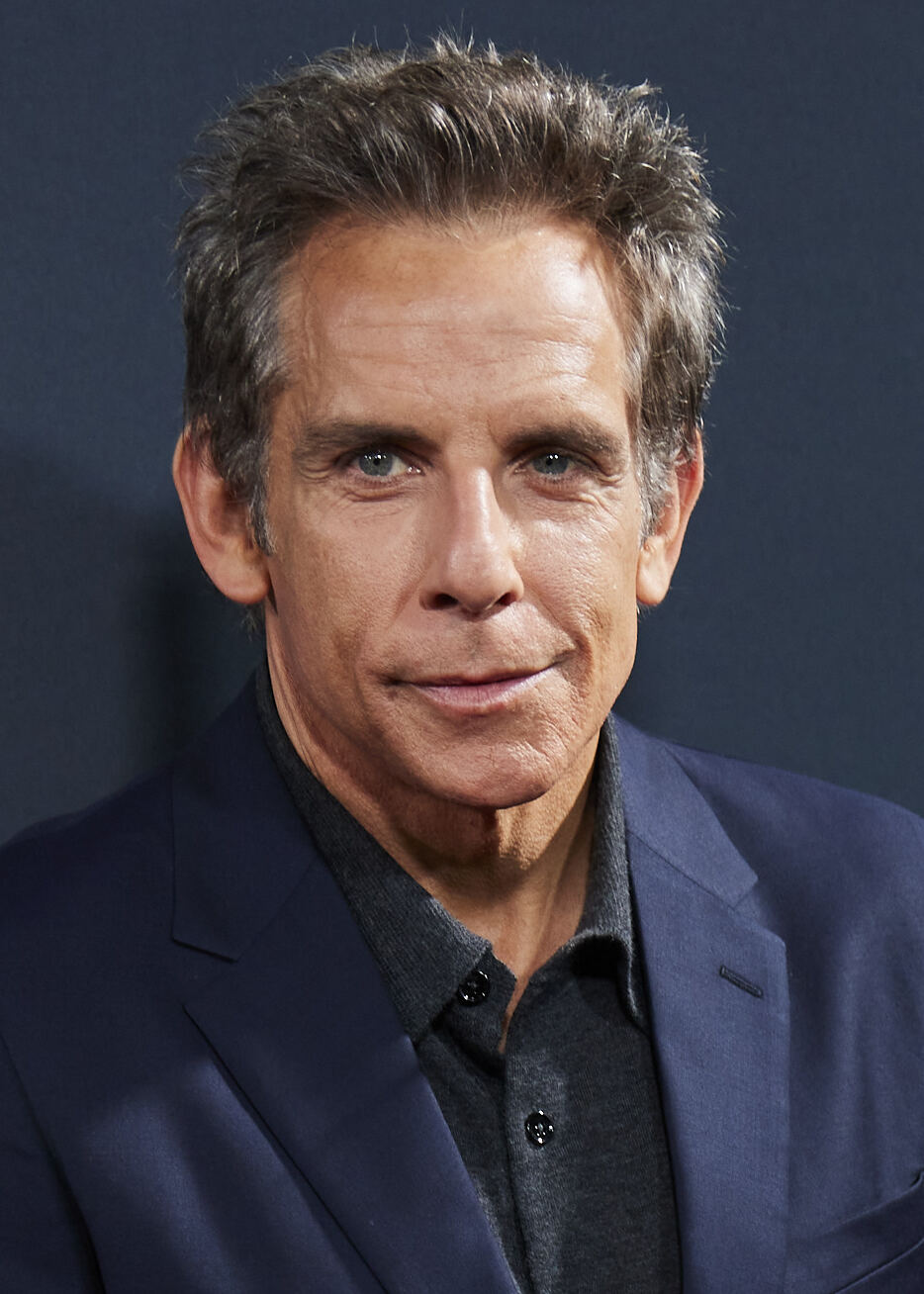
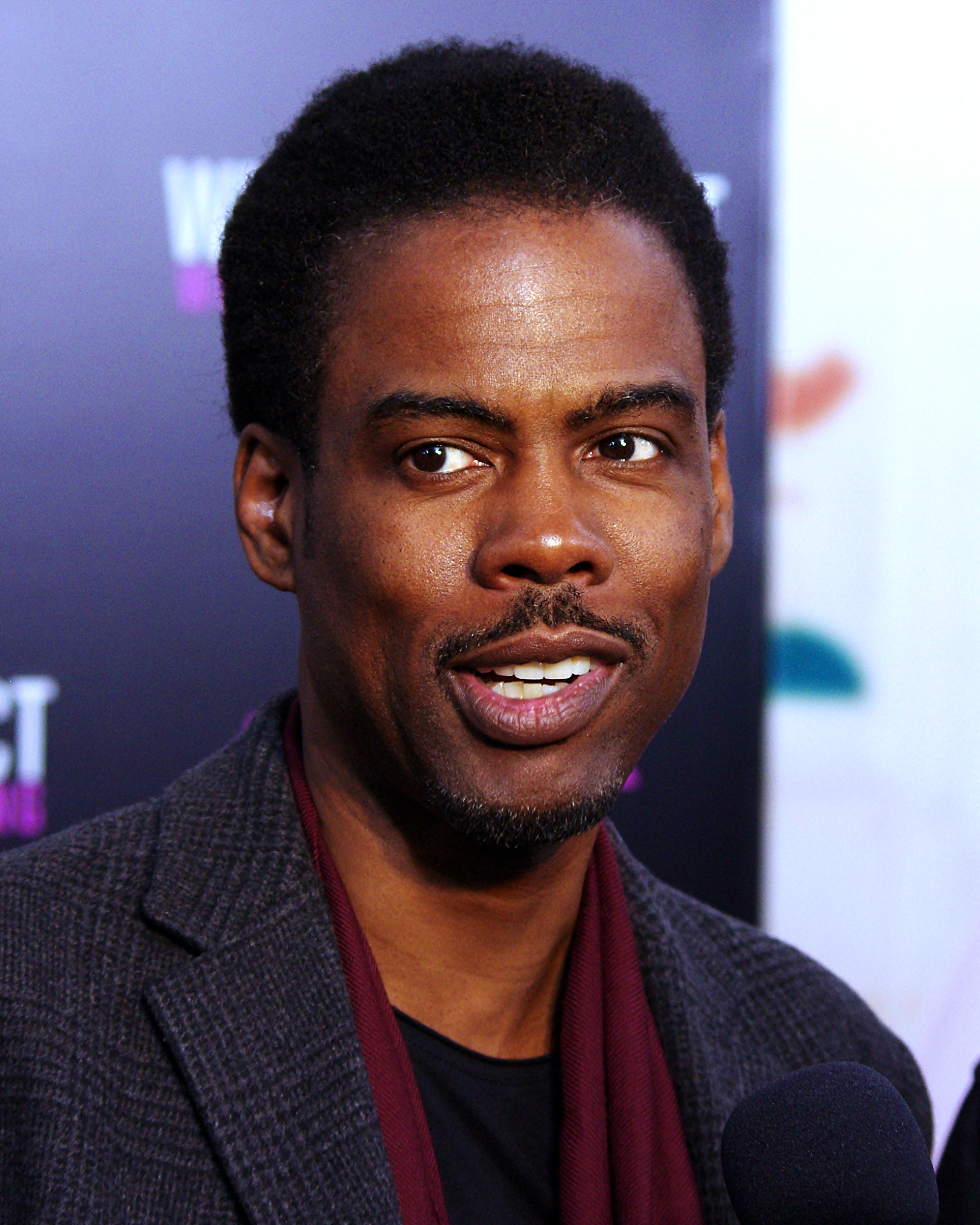
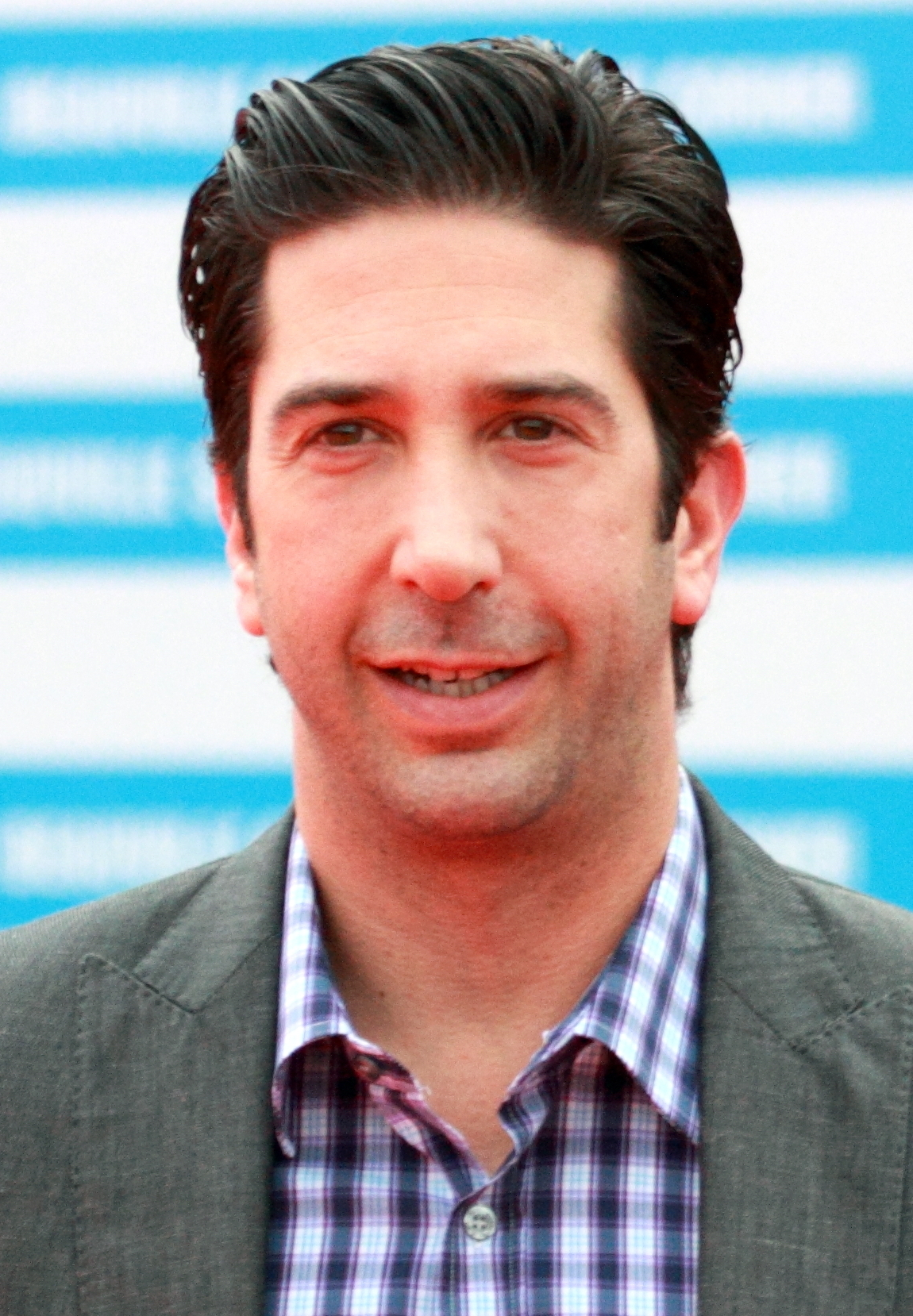
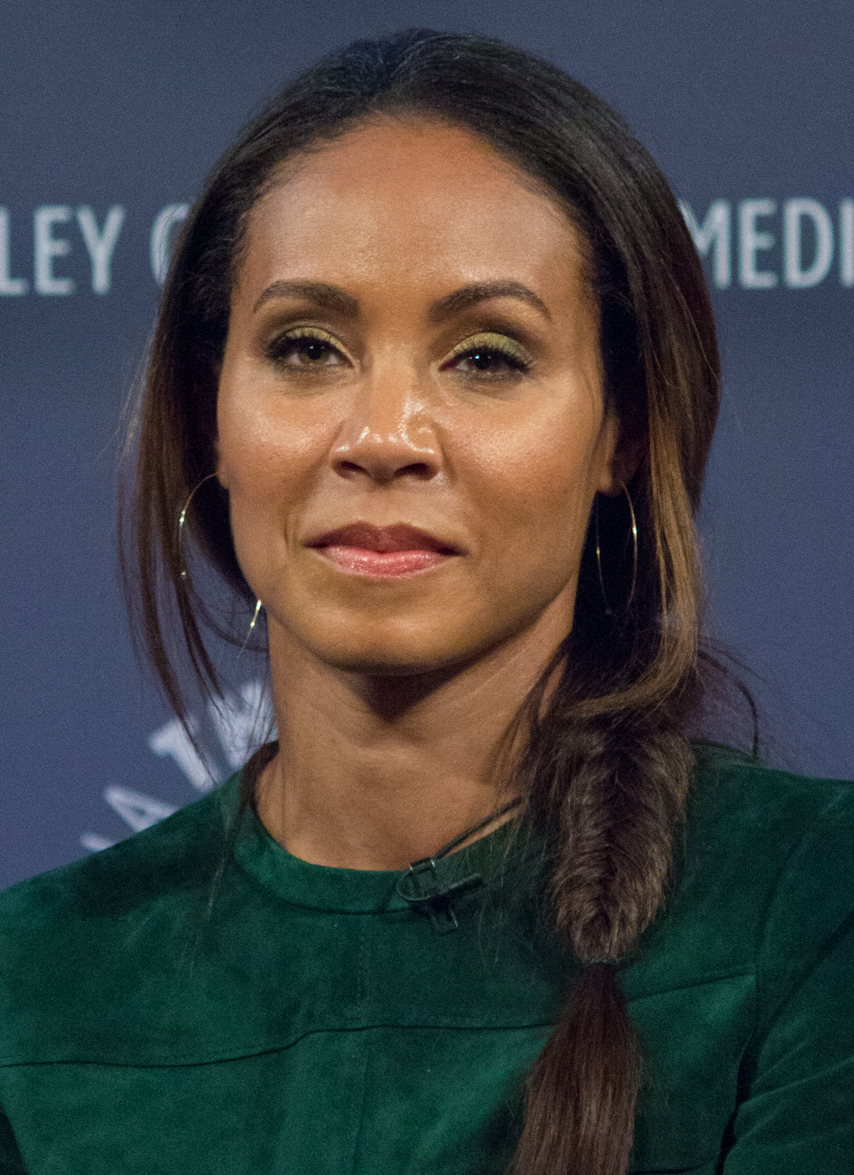
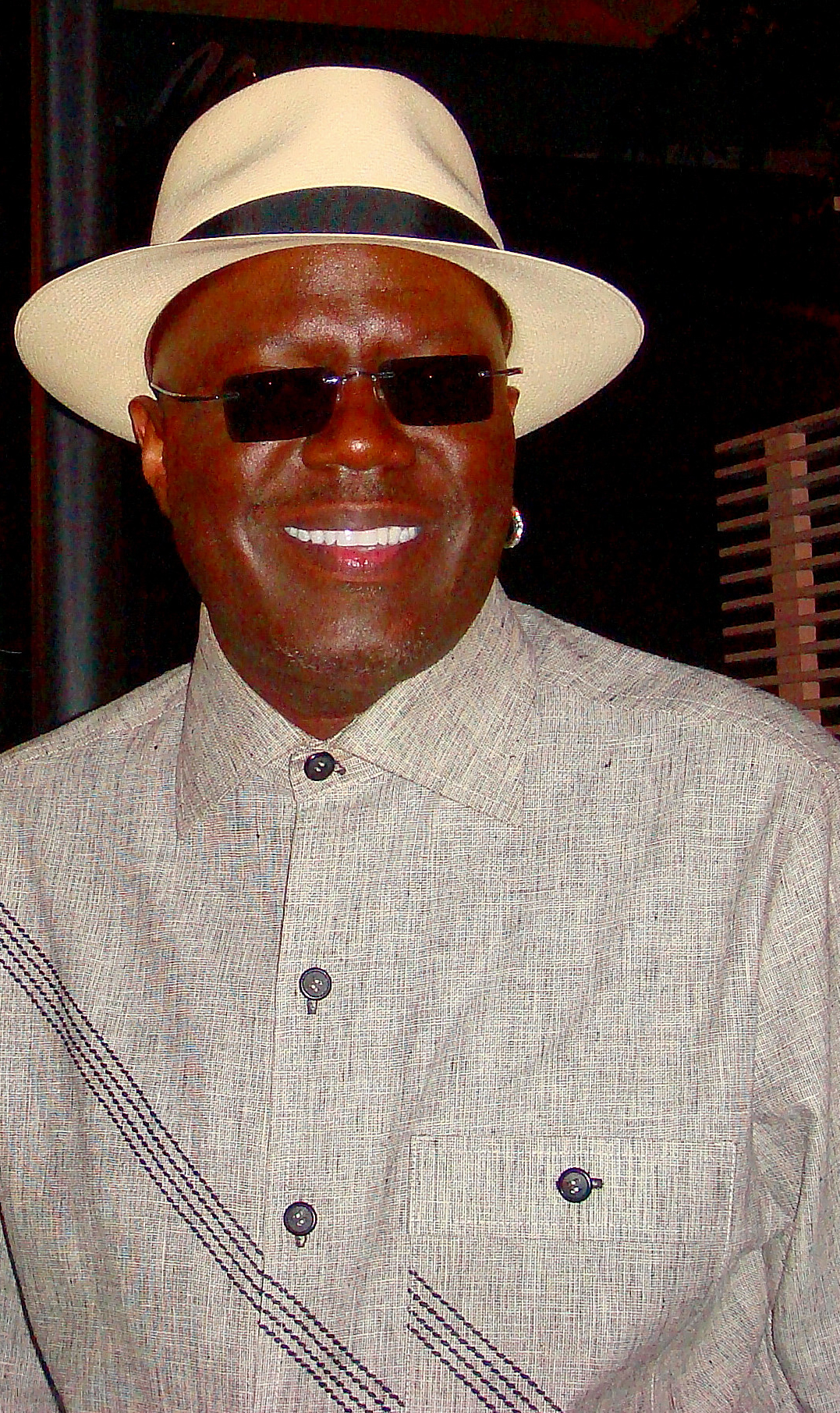
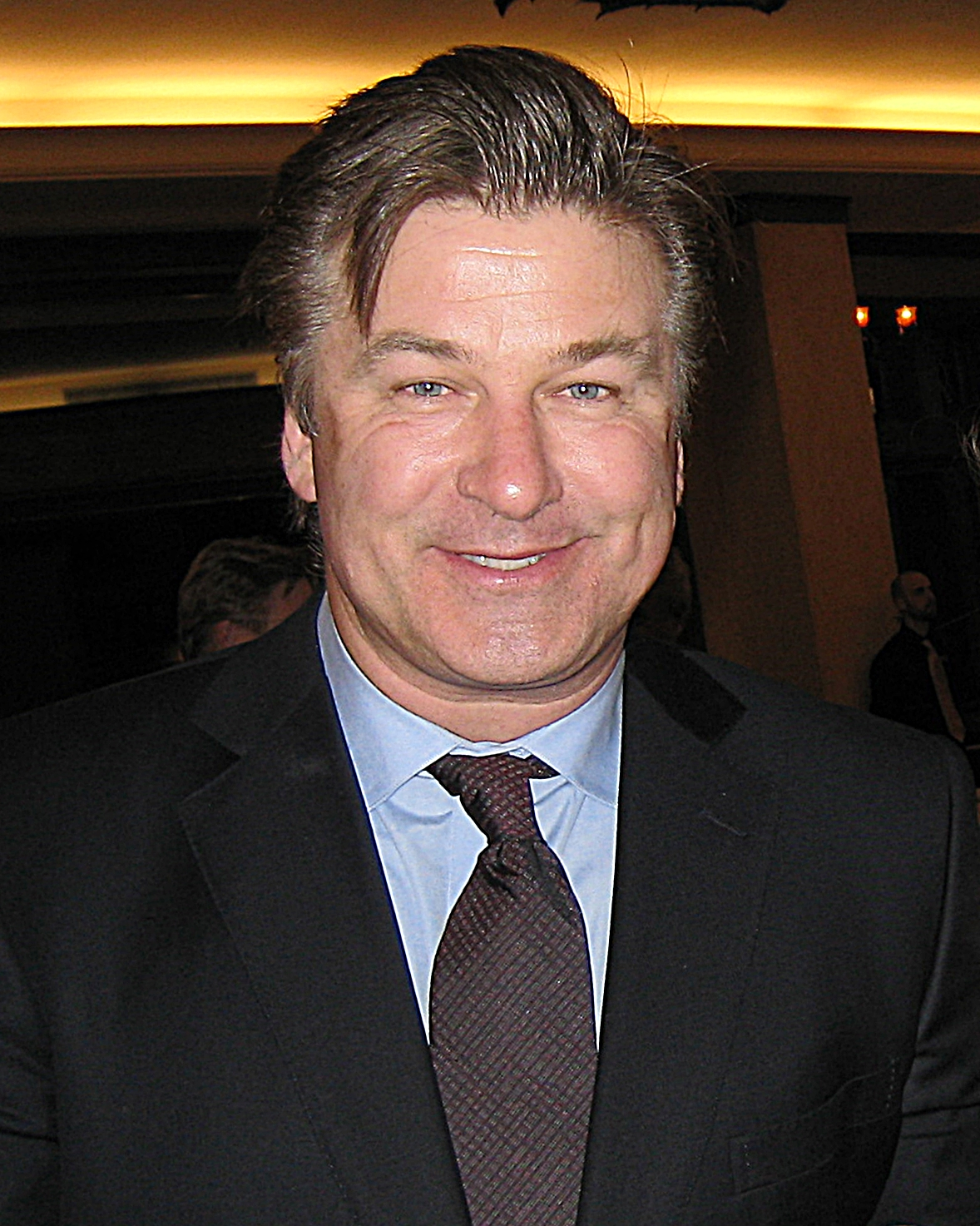
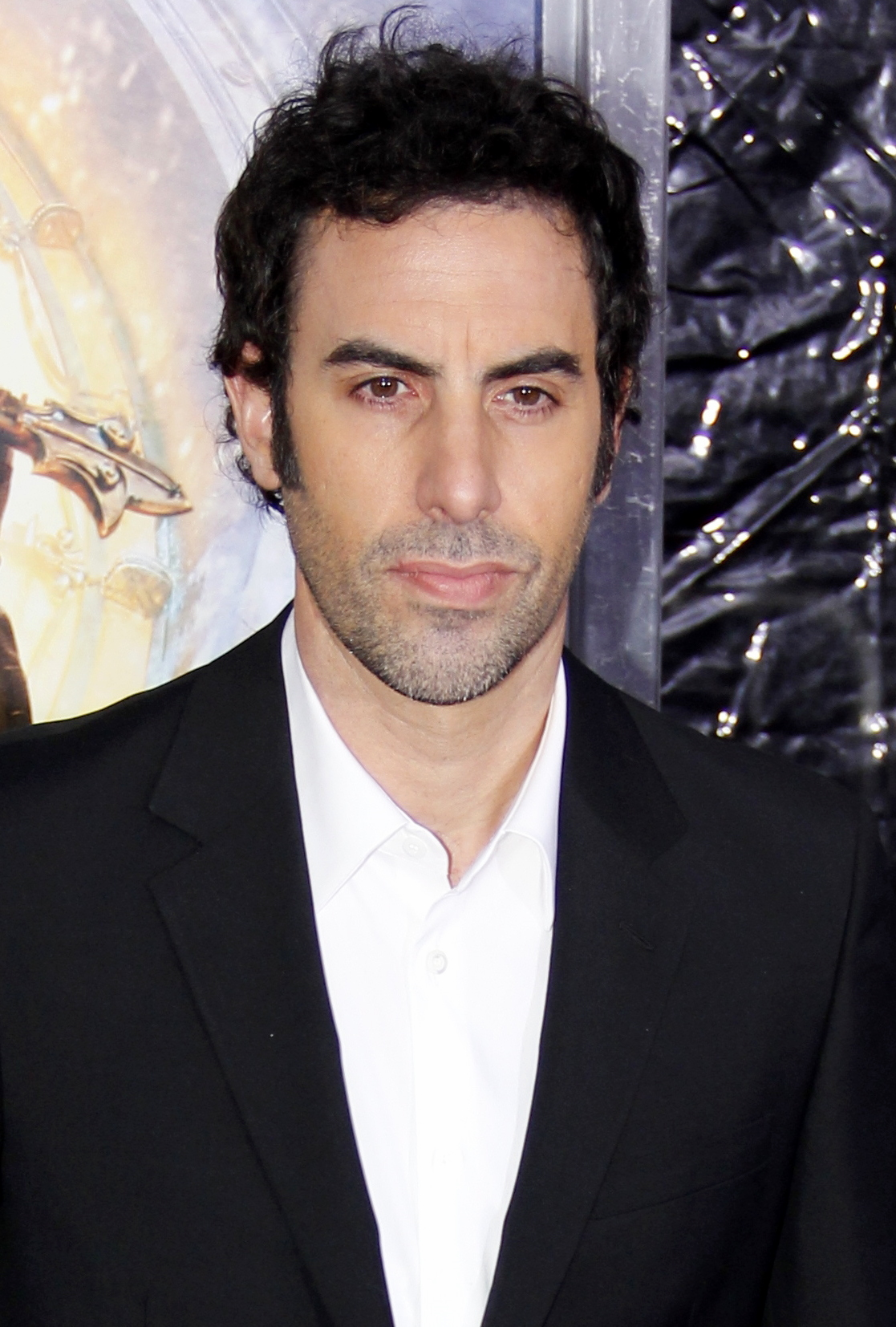
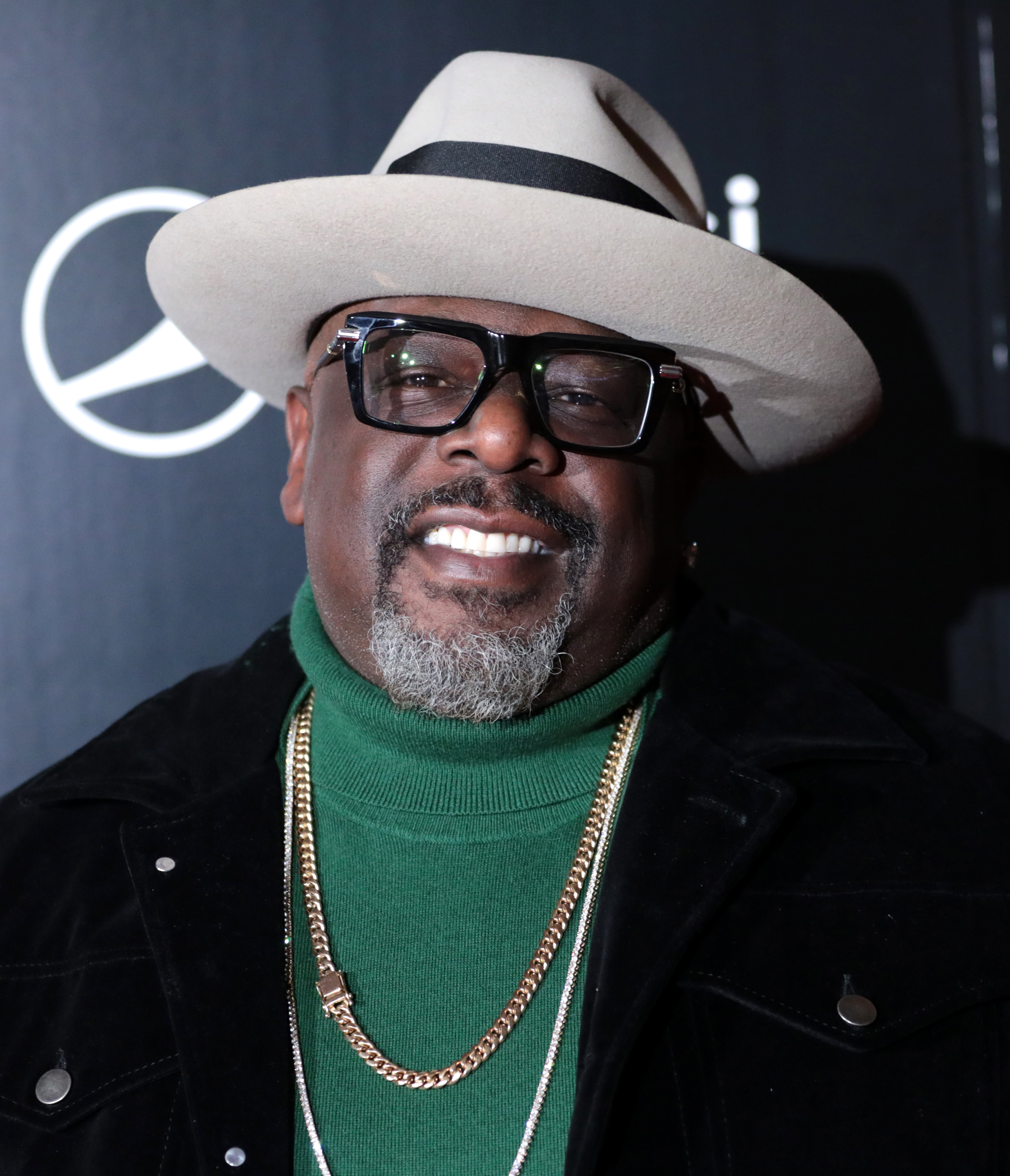
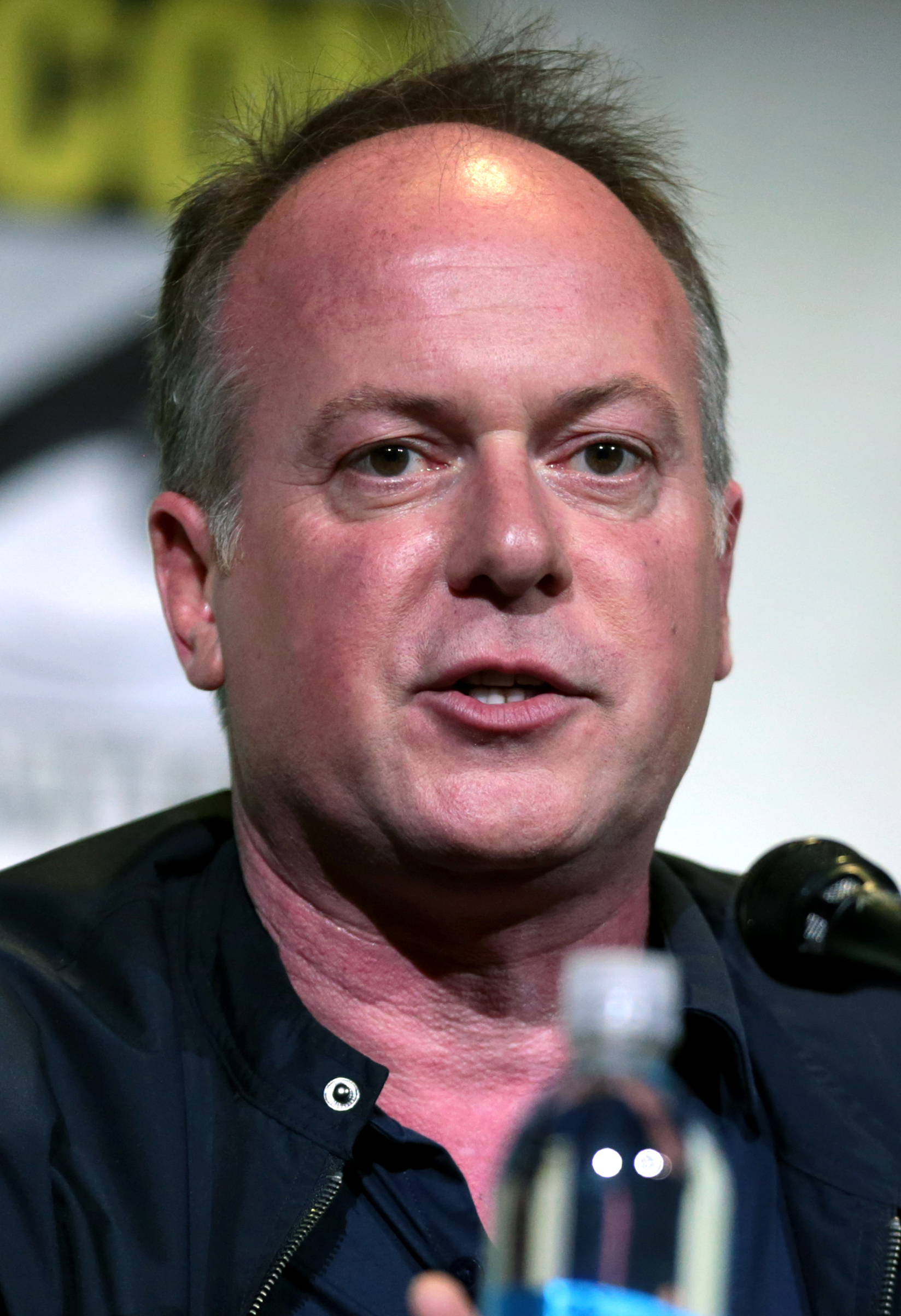
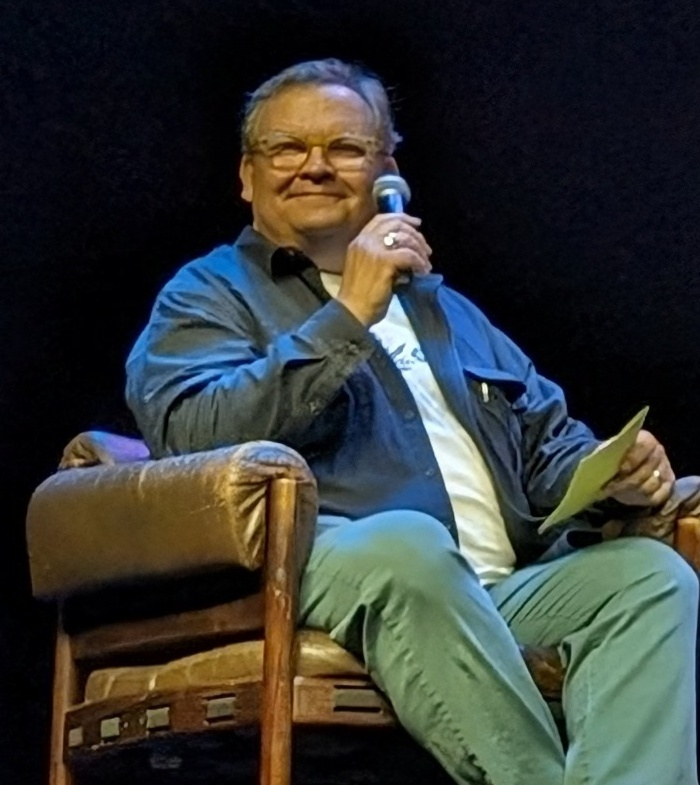
Clockwise from top left: Main cast members Ben Stiller, Chris Rock, David Schwimmer, Jada Pinkett Smith, Bernie Mac, Alec Baldwin, Sacha Baron Cohen, Cedric the Entertainer, Tom McGrath and Andy Richter voices Alex, Marty, Melman, Gloria, Zuba, Makunga, King Julien XIII, Maurice, Skipper and Mort
- Ben Stiller as Alex, a African lion.
  - Quinn Dempsey Stiller, Ben Stiller's son, as Alex as a baby, known as Alakay.
  - Declan Swift as young Alex
- Chris Rock as Marty, a plains zebra and Alex's best friend.
  - Thomas Stanley as young Marty
  - Rock also voices the other zebras in the herd.
- David Schwimmer as Melman, a reticulated giraffe and one of Alex's friends.
  - Zachary Gordon as young Melman.
- Jada Pinkett Smith as Gloria, a hippopotamus, one of Alex's friends, and Melman's girlfriend.
  - Willow Smith, Jada Pinkett Smith's daughter, as young Gloria
- Bernie Mac as Zuba, Alex's father and the alpha lion.
- Alec Baldwin as Makunga, a lion who rivals Zuba for the position of alpha.
- Sherri Shepherd as Florrie (Note: Florrie is listed in the end credits as "Mom".), Alex's mother and Zuba's mate.
- Sacha Baron Cohen as King Julien XIII, a ring-tailed lemur and the king of the lemurs in Madagascar.
- Cedric the Entertainer as Maurice, an aye-aye who is King Julien's royal advisor and assistant.
- Tom McGrath as Skipper, the leader of the penguins.
- Chris Miller as Kowalski, Skipper's second-in-command and the most intelligent of the penguins.
- Christopher Knights as Private, the English-accented, mild-mannered, and eager rookie of the penguins.
- Andy Richter as Mort, a Goodman's mouse lemur and King Julien's biggest fan.
- Conrad Vernon as Mason, a chimpanzee.
- Elisa Gabrielli as Nana, an elderly old lady woman who opposes the animals.
- Eric Darnell as Joe the Masai giraffe and as one of the poachers who captures young Alex.
- Al Roker as a newscaster.
- will.i.am as Moto Moto, a common hippopotamus who is attracted to Gloria.
- Phil LaMarr as Safari Tour Guide.
- Stephen Kearin as Stephen the Masai giraffe, as a black rhinoceros, and as one of the New Yorkers.
- Danny Jacobs as one of the New Yorkers.
- Dan O'Connor as an African buffalo and as one of the New Yorkers.
- Stacy Ferguson as a female common hippopotamus.
- Harland Williams as a Masai giraffe.
- Bridget Hoffman as one of the New Yorkers.
- David P. Smith as Bobby the Kirk's dik-dik
- John Eric Bentley provided additional voices.
- Fred Tatasciore as Teetsi the lion and as one of the poachers who captures young Alex.

Non-speaking roles in the film include Phil, the other main chimpanzee; and Rico, the mute loose cannon explosives expert and weapons supplier of the penguins.

== Production ==
=== Development ===
A sequel to Madagascar had been in development since 2005, when the first film was released, with a release date planned for late 2008. In the first teaser trailer, which was released in March 2008, the film was subtitled The Crate Escape. By June 2008, the film was given its final title – Escape 2 Africa. Los Angeles-based studio Duck Studios, animated the end credits scene using cutout animation with a style inspired by African art. Escape 2 Africa marks the first full producer credit of British production manager Mark Swift for a feature film; he would later produce the succeeding films in the Madagascar franchise.

== Reception ==
=== Critical response ===
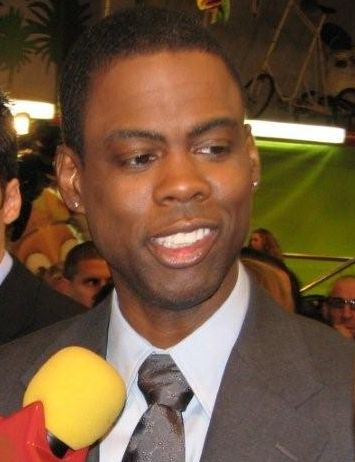
Chris Rock at the Israeli premiere of the film, on November 22, 2008.

Rotten Tomatoes reported that 64% of critics gave the film a positive review, with an average rating of 5.9/10, based on 153 reviews. The website's consensus reads, "Madagascar: Escape 2 Africa is an improvement on the original, with more fleshed-out characters, crisper animation and more consistent humor." Another review aggregator, Metacritic classified the film into the "generally favorable" reviews category with 61/100 approval rating based on 25 reviews, also a bit higher a score than the original. Audiences polled by CinemaScore gave the film an average grade of "A−" on an A+ to F scale.

Michael Phillips of the Chicago Tribune stated in his review that the film "goes easy on the pop culture jokes, I should clarify: one of the smarter things in the script is how Alex, who digs his Bob Fosse and Jerome Robbins dance moves, becomes the film's primary pop-cult gag." Roger Ebert of the Chicago Sun-Times gave the film 3/4 stars and wrote "This is a brighter, more engaging film than the original Madagascar." John Anderson of Newsday gave the film 3.5/4 stars and stated "Madagascar 2: Escape to Africa, the sequel to the enormously successful DreamWorks adventure and a film that hews close to the whole Lion King/species-as-destiny/self-fulfillment paradigm." Joe Morgenstern of The Wall Street Journal wrote: "The roots are shallow, but the sequel is good-natured, high-spirited and perfectly enjoyable if you take it for what it is." Jim Schembri of The Age gave the film 3.5/5 stars, describing it as a "hugely entertaining, lightning-fast, ceaselessly funny follow-up to the adorable 2005 animated hit", and deemed it one of the best animated films of 2008. Kelly Jane Torrance of The Washington Times gave the film 3/5 stars, writing that it "might not offer audiences cutting-edge animation or a particularly original story", but added: "It still has a lot going for it, though: foot-tapping music, laughs for young and old and the prodigious talents of Sacha Baron Cohen."

Shubra Gupta of The Indian Express wrote that the film was "as spunky, witty and funny" as its predecessor, and praised the animation and characters, but criticized the story for "[taking] the same course as The Lion King, with a detour towards Shrek thrown in." Carrie Rickey of The Philadelphia Inquirer gave the film 2/4 stars and wrote: "Take the flat tire that was Madagascar. Retread it with The Lion King storyline. Pump it up with air. Now you have Madagascar: Escape 2 Africa." Peter Bradshaw of The Guardian gave the film 2/5 stars, describing it as "a frankly disappointing piece of opportunism, with a non-plot which shamelessly rips off The Lion King." Anthony Quinn of The Independent also gave the film 2/5 stars, writing: "The visual invention and draughtsmanship are mightily impressive; a shame the drama's a bit of a bore."

=== Box office ===
On its opening day, the film grossed $17.6 million from 4,056 theaters with a $4,328 average. It went to be at number 1 at the box office with $63.1 million with $15,559 average per theater. As of March 19, 2009, it had grossed $180 million (29.8% of total gross) in the United States and Canada along with a gross of $424 million (70.2%) in other territories adding to a worldwide gross total of $604 million.

=== Accolades ===
Award	Ceremony date	Category	Recipients	Result
Annie Awards	January 30, 2009	Annie Award for Animated Effects in a Feature Production	Fangwei Lee	Nominated
Annie Awards	January 30, 2009	Writing in a Feature Production	Etan Cohen, Eric Darnell and Tom McGrath	Nominated
Critics' Choice Movie Awards	January 8, 2009	Best Animated Feature		Nominated
Nickelodeon Kids' Choice Awards	March 28, 2009	Favorite Animated Movie		Won
Visual Effects Society	February 10, 2009	Outstanding Effects Animation in an Animated Feature		Nominated

== Music ==
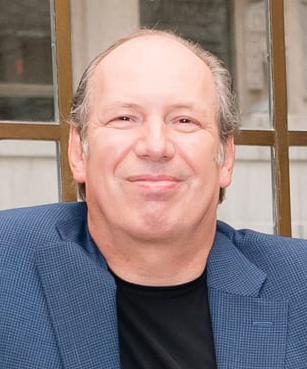
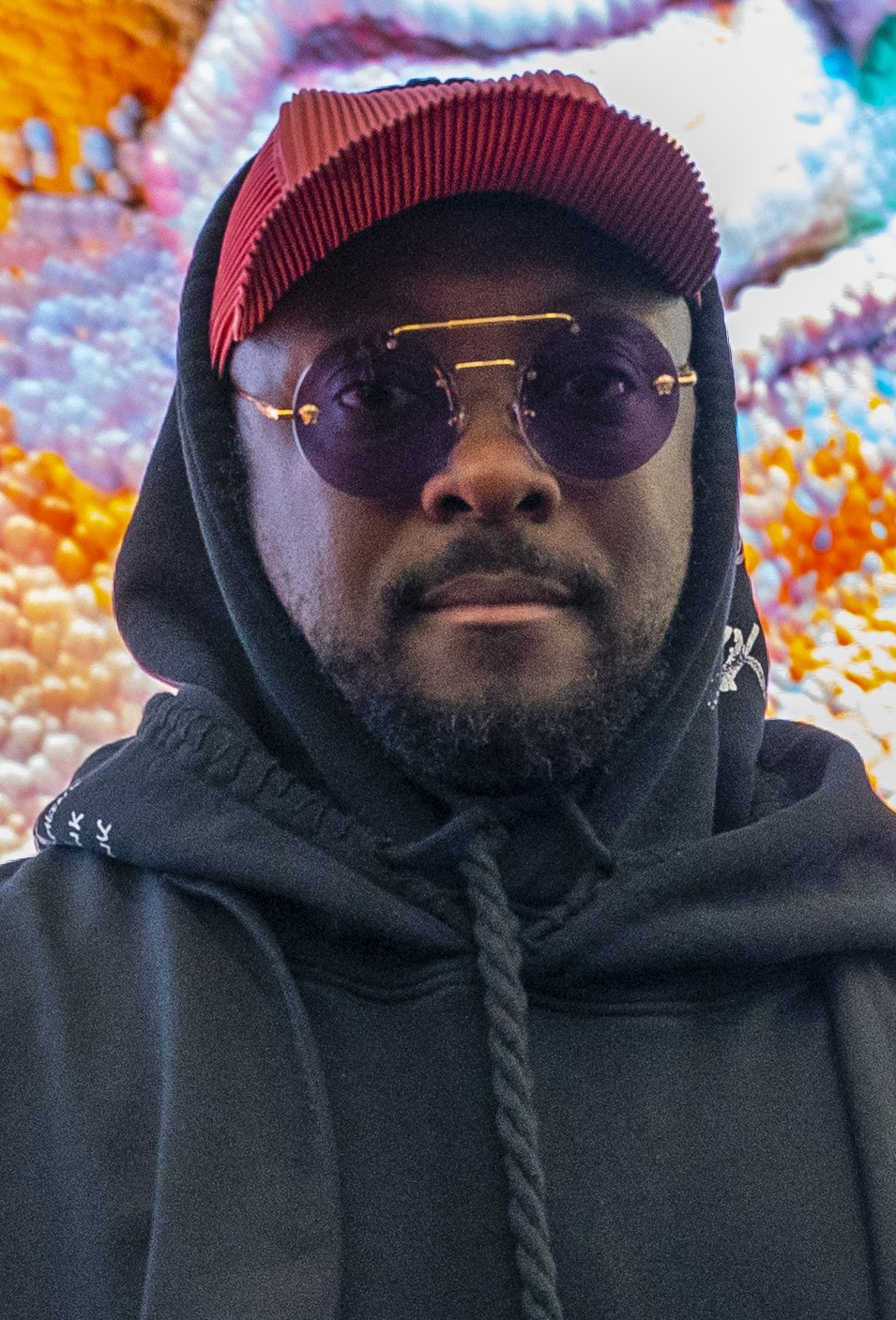
Hans Zimmer (left) composed the film's score and will.i.am (right) performed the songs.

Hans Zimmer returned to compose the score for the film, this time being joined by will.i.am. The soundtrack includes five new songs performed by will.i.am; his cover of "I Like to Move It" was used in the end credits.

== Home media ==
Madagascar: Escape 2 Africa was released on DVD and Blu-ray Disc on February 6, 2009 by Paramount Home Entertainment, along with two episodes from The Penguins of Madagascar series: "Popcorn Panic" and "Gone in a Flash". In the first week at the DVD sales chart, Madagascar opened at No. 1, selling 1,681,938 units which translated to $27.09m in revenue. As of April 2010, 13.7 million home entertainment units were sold worldwide. The film was released on 4K Ultra HD Blu-ray on July 21, 2026.

The Madagascar: Escape 2 Africa - Movie Storybook was written by Rob Scotton and illustrated by Michael Koelsch, and was published by HarperCollins Children's Books in 2008. Koelsch had previously illustrated the Madagascar - Movie Storybook for Scholastic in 2005.

== Video game ==
A video game based on the film was made for the Xbox 360, PlayStation 3, Wii, PlayStation 2, Microsoft Windows, and Nintendo DS, and released on November 4, 2008, in North America. Its gameplay is similar to the first movie's video game with the same characters and moves, although the environment is set in Africa.

== Sequel ==
A sequel titled Madagascar 3: Europe's Most Wanted was released on June 8, 2012. Alex, Marty, Gloria, and Melman are still fighting to get home to New York. This time their journey takes them to a traveling circus in Europe which they will reinvent Madagascar style.
