= Chris Miller (animator) =

American animator and voice actor (born 1968)

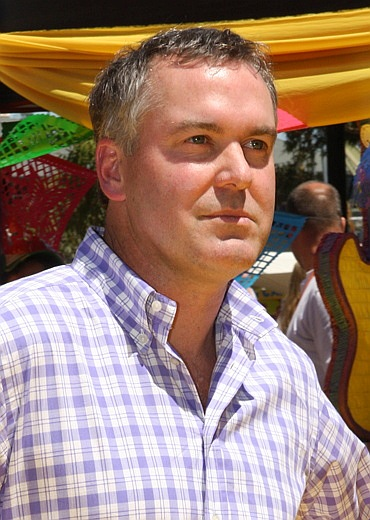
- Miller in November 2011 at a premiere of Puss in Boots in Sydney
- Born: Christopher Matthew Miller; January 20, 1968 (age 58)
- Occupations: Animator; director; voice actor
- Years active: 1988–present
- Employer(s): DreamWorks Animation (1998–2018); Reel FX Animation Studios (2018–2022); Paramount Animation (2022–present)
- Notable work: Shrek the Third; Puss in Boots; Smurfs

Christopher Matthew Miller (born January 20, 1968) is an American animator, director, and voice actor employed by Paramount Animation and formerly DreamWorks Animation. He is best known for directing Shrek the Third and Puss in Boots (for which he received his first Academy Award nomination) and for voicing The Magic Mirror from the Shrek film series and Kowalski the penguin in the Madagascar film series. At Paramount Animation, he was the leader, director, and star of the Smurfs (2025), in which he provided the voices of Grouchy Smurf and Camouflage.

== Early life ==
He studied animation at the California Institute of Arts.

== Career ==
In an interview with Robert K. Elder for The Film That Changed My Life, Miller attributes his success in film to Sleeper. "I would be penniless and drunk on the corner, begging for cash, if I had not seen the film Sleeper. I guarantee you."

In 2011, Miller directed Puss in Boots, a spin-off and sequel to the Shrek franchise. His wife, Laura Gorenstein Miller, worked as a dance choreographer.

== Filmography ==
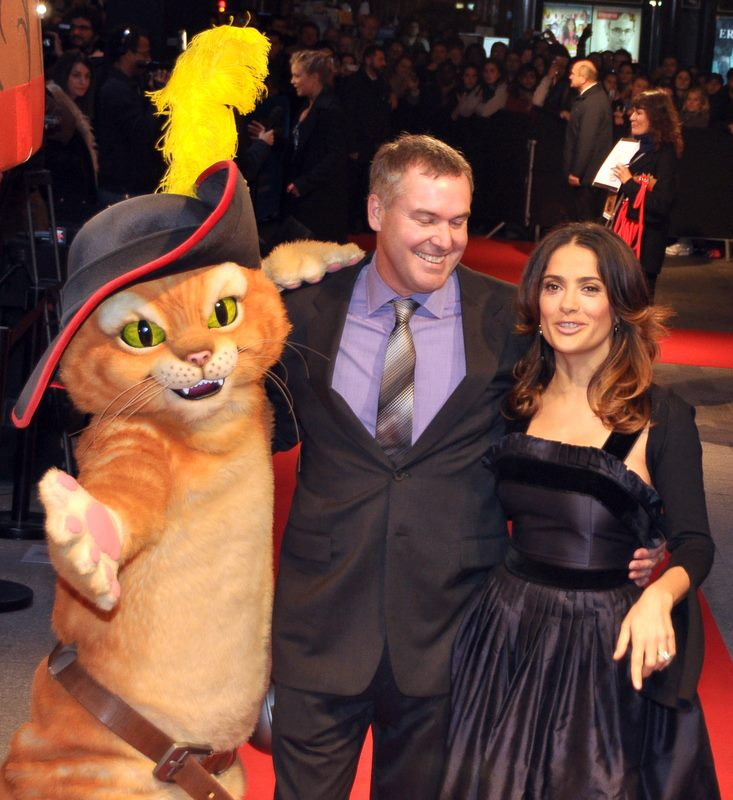
Miller with Salma Hayek pose with a Puss mascot at a premiere of Puss in Boots in Paris

Year	Title	Role	Notes
1988	The Thing What Lurked in the Tub	Lugmeyer	
1988	Lea Press on Limbs		Director
1989	The Cellar	Willy Cashen	
1992	Cool World		Key clean-up artist
1997	Officer Buckle and Gloria		Storyboard artist
1998	Antz		Storyboard artist
2001	Shrek	Geppetto, Magic Mirror	Story artist/additional dialogue
2003	Sinbad: Legend of the Seven Seas	Tower Guard	Additional story artist
2004	Shrek 2	Humphries, Magic Mirror	Head of story/additional dialogue
2004	Shark Tale		Additional storyboard artist
2005	Madagascar	Kowalski	Story artist
2007	Shrek the Third	Puppet Master, Announcer, Mascot, Singing Villain	Director/screenplay
2008	Madagascar: Escape 2 Africa	Kowalski	
2009	Monsters vs. Aliens	Advisor Cole, Army Commander Jones	Additional story artist
2010	Shrek Forever After	Royal Messenger, Magic Mirror, Geppetto	
2011	Puss in Boots	Little Boy Blue, Friar Miller, Prison Guard, Manual, Rafael	Director
2012	Madagascar 3: Europe's Most Wanted	Kowalski	
2013	Turbo	Tour Bus Driver	
2014	Penguins of Madagascar	Kowalski	
2017	The Boss Baby	Captain Ross	
2017	Captain Underpants: The First Epic Movie	Nobel Audience Member	
2025	Smurfs	Grouchy / Camouflage (voice)	Director
TBA	Untitled wish-themed project		Director

=== Television ===
Year	Title	Role	Notes
2007	Shrek the Halls		Dialogue director
2009	Merry Madagascar	Kowalski	
2013	Phineas and Ferb	Additional Voices	

=== Video games ===
Year	Title	Role	Notes
2002	Shrek Super Party	Magic Mirror	
2005	Madagascar	Kowalski, Sleeping Sailor, Sports Car Driver	
2005	Madagascar: Operation Penguin	Kowalski	
2008	Shrek's Carnival Craze	Magic Mirror	
2008	Madagascar: Escape 2 Africa	Kowalski, Clem	
2010	Shrek Forever After	Magic Mirror	
