= The Penguins of Madagascar =

American animated television series

- Genre: Comedy; Action; Adventure
- Based on: Madagascar characters by Tom McGrath and Eric Darnell
- Developed by: Mark McCorkle; Bob Schooley
- Directed by: Bret Haaland; Nick Filippi
- Voices of: Tom McGrath; John DiMaggio; Jeff Bennett; James Patrick Stuart; Danny Jacobs; Kevin Michael Richardson; Andy Richter; Conrad Vernon; Tara Strong; Nicole Sullivan; Mary Scheer
- Composer: Adam Berry
- Country of origin: United States
- No. of seasons: 3
- No. of episodes: 149 (list of episodes)

Production
- Executive producers: Mark McCorkle; Bob Schooley
- Producers: Dina Buteyn (S2); Dean Hoff (S2); Andrew Huebner (S3)
- Running time: 11 minutes; 22 minutes (long-length specials: episodes 48, 55, 79, 98, 110, 122, 146, and 147); 44 minutes ("The Return of the Revenge of Dr. Blowhole," episode 99)
- Production companies: DreamWorks Animation; Nickelodeon Animation Studio

Original release
- Network: Nickelodeon (2008–12); Nicktoons (2015–16)
- Release: November 28, 2008 – January 4, 2016

The Penguins of Madagascar is an American animated television series produced by Nickelodeon Animation Studio in association with DreamWorks Animation. It stars nine characters from DreamWorks' animated film Madagascar—Skipper (Tom McGrath), Rico (John DiMaggio), Kowalski (Jeff Bennett), Private (James Patrick Stuart), King Julien (Danny Jacobs), Maurice (Kevin Michael Richardson), Mort (Andy Richter), Mason (Conrad Vernon), and Phil. Characters new to the series include an otter named Marlene (Nicole Sullivan) and a zookeeper named Alice (Mary Scheer). It is the first Nicktoon co-produced with DreamWorks Animation. The series was executive-produced by Bob Schooley and Mark McCorkle, who were the creators of the animated series Buzz Lightyear of Star Command (a spin-off of Pixar's Toy Story franchise) and Disney Channel's Kim Possible.

The pilot episode, "Gone in a Flash," aired as part of "Superstuffed Nicktoons Weekend" on November 28, 2008, and The Penguins of Madagascar became a regular series on March 28, 2009. The series premiere drew 6.1 million viewers, setting a new record as the most-watched premiere.

The Penguins of Madagascar aired after Madagascar: Escape 2 Africa was released, but it does not take place at a precise time within the franchise as it is unknown as to how the penguins and lemurs arrived at the zoo without the other characters from the Madagascar movies, although the series does occasionally allude to the rest of it. The show started production before an ending to Escape 2 Africa had been established. McGrath, who is also the co-creator of the film characters and voice of Skipper, has said that the series takes place "not specifically before or after the movie, I just wanted them all back at the zoo. I think of it as taking place in a parallel universe."

At the end of 2010, the show was the number two animated program on television among kids age 2–11 and in basic cable total viewers. The show received praise for its animation quality, regarded as very good for the time.

In December 2014, DiMaggio stated that the show ended production. The show's executive producers, Mark McCorkle and Bob Schooley, later served as executive consultants for DreamWorks' next Madagascar spin-off series (All Hail King Julien).

A revival of the series was pitched by Spider-Man: Beyond the Spider-Verse artist Kade Byrand, but ended up being rejected.

== Plot ==
The Penguins of Madagascar is a spin-off of the Madagascar films. The series follows the adventures of four penguins—Skipper, Kowalski, Private, and Rico, who perform various commando-like missions to protect their home in the Central Park Zoo. The penguins often have to deal with problems caused, or made worse, by their zoo neighbors, King Julien XIII (a ring-tailed lemur), Maurice (an aye-aye), and Mort (a mouse lemur).

== Characters ==
The Penguins of Madagascar features the four penguin characters from the Madagascar franchise, as well as the two chimpanzees and the three lemurs. Characters new to the franchise include Marlene the otter and Alice the zookeeper, among others. Tom McGrath, John DiMaggio, Andy Richter, and Conrad Vernon reprise their roles as Skipper, Rico, Mort, and Mason respectively.

All four of the penguin characters are designed differently in the cartoon than they are in the movie to make them more distinguishable and easier to tell apart. Skipper's head is flatter in the series; Kowalski is taller; Rico has an unexplained scar over his mouth, a double chin, and a feathery Mohawk; and Private is shorter, younger, and rounder. Their personalities and abilities were also exaggerated. The texture of the characters was also changed to be better suited for television work.

=== Main ===
- Skipper (voiced by Tom McGrath) is the leader of the penguins, who devises tactics and gives orders. Arrogant, calculating, strict, temperamental and energetic, Skipper's raving paranoia and tendency to view even the most ordinary activities as a military operation, combined with his experience in covert ops, has driven him to prepare for nearly any situation, no matter how bizarre or unlikely. He is also the second-youngest of the penguins. It is revealed in the episode "Needle Point" that Skipper is afraid of needles. McGrath reprises his role from the films.
- Kowalski (voiced by Jeff Bennett) is the oldest of the penguins and is the team's intelligence officer, strategist, and gadgeteer. He is a brilliant inventor, but cannot read (although he does carry around a clipboard upon which he records drawings of their plans). He also tends to over-analyze situations and has created many amazing devices which have put the team in danger. It is revealed in the episode "Needle Point" that he is afraid of going to the dentist. Bennett replaces Chris Miller from the films.
- Rico (voiced by John DiMaggio) is the second-oldest of the penguins and is the team's explosives specialist and weapons supplier, who mainly communicates through grunts, coughs and squeals, but sometimes he can speak rather normally. Slightly unhinged, Rico swallows useful tools, such as dynamite, and regurgitates them when needed, to the point of regularly regurgitating objects that appear to be too large for him to have swallowed in the first place. He has been referred to as a psychopath in several episodes. He is shown in some episodes to be in a relationship with a female doll called Miss Perky. DiMaggio reprises his role from the short film The Madagascar Penguins in a Christmas Caper.
- Private (voiced by James Patrick Stuart) is the youngest of the penguins and is the emotionally sensitive, mild-mannered, English-accented rookie of the team. Though younger and inexperienced than the other penguins, he is the most down to earth; Private tends to offer simpler, more commonsense solutions in response to Skipper and Kowalski's complex strategies, often in an understated tone while those strategies are falling apart (e.g., "The Officer X Factor"). He often shows an eager interest in unicorns, as evidenced by his love of a show called "The Lunacorns" (e.g., "Hello, Dollface," "Operation: Lunacorn Apocalypse"), for which he is often ridiculed. Private is also a skilled fighter. Stuart replaces Christopher Knights from the films.
- King Julien XIII (voiced by Danny Jacobs) is a fun loving, witty, narcissistic ring-tailed lemur. Normally shortened to King Julien, he is a comically conceited character who has little regard for others, even his subjects Maurice and Mort. He has a tendency to use malapropisms and misinterpret figures of speech. King Julien considers himself to be the King of the Central Park Zoo, but is oblivious to the other animals' dislike of him. He is very lazy, childish, immature, dimwitted and spoiled to the point where he will not offer assistance to ensure his own safety, but will help the penguins when push comes to shove. He is also very proud of his bottom, which he refers to as "The Royal Booty." Jacobs replaces Sacha Baron Cohen from the films.
- Maurice (voiced by Kevin Michael Richardson) is an aye-aye who is King Julien's royal advisor and assistant, although he is rarely listened to. Maurice accepts his life as a servant and supports Julien more often than in the films, but he occasionally shows disdain towards King Julien and his inconsiderate attitude. He seems to be aware of human activities and inventions, even though he has spent most of his life away from human civilization. Richardson replaces Cedric the Entertainer from the films.
- Mort (voiced by Andy Richter) is an excitable, dimwitted, accident-prone mouse lemur who is Julien's biggest fan and Maurice's best friend. Unlike Maurice, Mort is fiercely devoted to Julien, even displaying a massive obsession with the latter's feet. Julien often treats him with contempt although the penguins, Maurice, and Marlene do care for him. He is considered to be the cutest animal in the zoo, which upsets Private. Mort is occasionally enlisted to help the penguins on a mission due to his small size or cuteness. Richter reprises his role from the films.
- Mason (voiced by Conrad Vernon) and Phil are two intelligent chimpanzees who often help out the penguins on their missions. Mason can speak and is very civilized and refined. Phil is mute, but is the only animal in the zoo that can read. Phil is often asked to read something, and then he communicates the message to Mason through sign language which is interpreted by Mason. Different episodes indicate that they are highly intelligent, but they are not openly aware of this themselves. Phil is considered for involvement with a space exploration program. Vernon reprises his role from the films.
- Marlene (voiced by Nicole Sullivan; Dee Bradley Baker in wild form) is an otter who was transferred to the Central Park Zoo from the Monterey Bay Aquarium. She is close friends with Skipper and sometimes tags along on his missions, but is often a neutral character who does not take sides between the penguins and the lemurs. By being a levelheaded, feminine voice of reason, she is a counterpoint to Skipper's masculine, covert-ops character. Since she was born in captivity, once she sets out of the confines of the zoo, she goes wild as she cannot cope with the lack of boundaries. Later after Kowalski separated her wild side, she becomes afraid as her feral side roams over the city. The penguins later put the two Marlenes back together and Marlene is able to control her wild side. In "Popcorn Panic," a brief shot of the zoo map reveals her enclosure to be that of an asian otter.

=== Recurring ===
- Roger (voiced by Richard Kind) is the penguins' alligator friend who lives in the sewer. They meet him in the episode "Haunted Habitat" when Skipper and Marlene go to investigate in the sewer under Marlene's habitat because of a strange sound. Roger tells the penguins that he is from Florida. He appears again in "Roger Dodger" when the sewer rats terrorize him and in "Gator Watch" when he wants a new home, eventually being captured and sent to the zoo.
- Max / "Moon-cat" (voiced by Wayne Knight) is the penguins' stray cat friend. He first meets the four penguins in the episode "Launchtime" when the penguins end up on a rooftop across the street from the zoo instead of on the moon. At first, the penguins thought he was a "moon-cat," but at the end they figure out he was a stray cat, but they still refer to Max as "Moon-cat" out of habit. Max is skinny and hopes to catch a bird in his life. He at first wanted to eat the penguins, but was so touched when they gave him a can of fish that he became their friend instead. He appeared again in "Cat's Cradle," in which he tried to hide from Officer X from Animal Control.
- Joey (voiced by James Patrick Stuart) is an anti-social kangaroo with a passion for boxing. He is extremely possessive of his habitat. Most of his comments refer to physically hurting the subject of discussion. He speaks with an Australian accent.
- Bada and Bing (voiced by John DiMaggio and Kevin Michael Richardson) are two gorillas who enjoy fighting. They once beat up Mort, which led to Mort growing after he was thrown into Kowalski's latest invention, and they then got beat up by Mort to get a mango. Julien once gave them many bananas but it is possible that they beat him up due to him giving too much to them. They are occasionally used as bodyguards to various characters, specifically anyone claiming to be the king. Some episodes suggest that the penguins are afraid of the gorillas due to their power, but these are outnumbered by episodes in which the penguins easily beat them, typically without provocation. They also tend to play up the stereotype of Italian-American mobsters.
- Fred (voiced by Fred Stoller) is a squirrel that takes everything said literally and has a slow monotone speech pattern. Fred lives in a park near the zoo. He dated Marlene in "Otter Things Have Happened," but she later broke up with him. He does not get excited about much, and consistently seems unhappy.
- Burt (voiced by John DiMaggio) is an Indian elephant who was just one of the extra animals during the beginning of the series, but then he evolved into a character later on and even got a central episode in "An Elephant Never Forgets." He is shown to be obsessed with peanuts.
- Manfredi and Johnson (voiced by James Patrick Stuart and Danny Jacobs) are two unseen recruits, referenced mainly by Skipper, who have suffered horrible, seemingly fatal ("You know, one up there and one down there!" – Skipper) events in a number of previous penguin missions. Their "fates" have included having been attacked by "flying piranhas," their remains later ladled into their graves with a teaspoon; having been short one escape tunnel, their remains later sent back in a manila envelope, coincidentally from Manila; having mistaken the "business end" of a beluga whale for an underwater escape tunnel, resulting in them not being able to speak for a month; having fallen for the "exploding elephant foot trick"; a Chinese lantern and six bottles of rocket fuel for a talent show; having lost their hearts, a lung, and 15 feet of intestine when they fell in love with two chinstrap sisters; and being apparently literally smothered when a message informing the others to smother them with affection was misinterpreted. The two make a brief appearance– alive– in the episode "The Penguin Who Loved Me." Manfredi and Johnson are also the names of the two American POWs killed while trying to escape the German prison camp in the 1953 film Stalag 17.
- Eggy (voiced by Tara Strong) is a duckling who the penguins once "egg-sitted" in "Paternal Egg-Stinct." In the episode "Hard Boiled Eggy," the penguins learn that because they influenced him while inside the egg, Eggy had all their commando strengths combined. At the end of the episode, Julien teaches Eggy how to dance and Eggy finds such better than trying to be a penguin.
- Alice (voiced by Mary Scheer) is a surly zookeeper who regularly expresses disinterest in her job. Though another worker can sometimes be heard on her walkie-talkie, and seen working around the zoo, their face is never seen.
- The Vesuvius Twins (voiced by Atticus Shaffer) are two schoolboys from a very wealthy family. They are disliked by all of the animals of the zoo because of how nasty they are. Even though they are repeatedly banned from going near the animals, they usually get around the ban because of their parents' wealth (e.g. purchasing all of the tickets for an event at the zoo). Private often encourages others to show kindness to the boys, choosing to believe that they are secretly good.
- Dr. Blowhole (voiced by Neil Patrick Harris) is penguins' archenemy. He is an evil bottlenose dolphin scientist and supervillain, who has red lobsters as minions. He was mentioned in the episodes "Eclipsed" and "Roomies," but he makes a full appearance in the special "Dr. Blowhole's Revenge." Dr. Blowhole makes another full appearance in "The Return of the Revenge of Dr. Blowhole," where he uses his "Mind Jacker" and "Diaboligizer" to take over Central Park Zoo, but transforms Julian's Mp3 player into a giant "music monster." In "The Penguin Who Loved Me" (a sequel episode to "The Return of the Revenge of Dr. Blowhole"), having had his memory erased by his own Mind Jacker, Blowhole remembers himself as Flippy, "Seaville's second most popular performer." He recalls nothing of the penguins or his evil self. In this episode, his real name is revealed to be Francis, and he has a sister named Doris. Blowhole rides on a Segway-type vehicle as his means of transportation on land. Four running gags are that his skin is "surprisingly pleasant to the touch," that he constantly mispronounces "penguins" as "peng-u-ins," that he calls the penguins "flightless," and that he constantly rubs in the fact that he has far more superior technology than the penguins do.
- Hans (voiced by John DiMaggio) is a devious puffin with a history with Skipper that involves a mission in Denmark that somehow resulted in Skipper being declared Public Enemy Number One in the country in question. During "Huffin & Puffin," he appeared in New York, initially apparently wanting to make peace with Skipper, before his true agenda was revealed to be his attempt to take control of the penguins' lair for revenge. With Skipper having infiltrated the lair and defeated Hans, he was then shipped to the Hoboken Zoo. He appeared in "The Return of the Revenge of Dr. Blowhole," working with Doctor Blowhole as part of a plan to take Skipper's memories.
- The Rat King (voiced by Diedrich Bader) is a genetically enhanced, muscular lab rat who is the leader of the rats that reside in the sewers. He constantly torments the penguins and never learns his lesson when he is defeated each time, although his raw strength often requires them to resort to less direct measures to defeat him. He even tries to take over their home, but is beaten by King Julien in an ice hockey game.
- Officer X (voiced by Cedric Yarbrough) is an animal control officer, who is obsessed with catching stray animals. He has a stronger grudge against the penguins than Alice. His first appearance is when he is searching for Max and the second appearance is when he was tracking down the penguins when they escaped the zoo. He is a very strong man and can take down even the strongest of animals, like Joey the Kangaroo. Officer X is very cocky and seems to have hunted many other animals before. In his second appearance, he was arrested for going on a rampage after losing the penguins. He was an exterminator hired to remove cockroaches that Rico had befriended in "Stop Bugging Me" and a temporary zookeeper when Alice went on vacation in "The Officer X Factor." In the episode "A Kipper for Skipper," he is shown to be a fishmonger and manages to capture Kowalski, Private and Rico, but as in the other times they manage to escape, even though he was close to catch Kowalski in his obsession, and again he gets in trouble with the law.
- Savio (voiced by Nestor Carbonell) is an enormous, sly and powerful green anaconda (usually merely referred to as a boa constrictor), and one of the penguins' most dangerous enemies. He speaks with a Spanish accent and enjoys eating small mammals. Savio appears in the episodes "The Big Squeeze" and "All Tied Up With a Boa." He also appears in "The Hoboken Surprise" and "The Terror of Madagascar."

== Episodes ==
Season	Episodes		Originally released		
Season	Episodes		First released	Last released	Network
1	48		November 28, 2008	February 15, 2010	Nickelodeon
2	68		March 13, 2010	March 31, 2012	Nickelodeon
3	33	26	April 16, 2012	November 10, 2012	Nickelodeon
3	33	7	December 24, 2013	January 4, 2016	Nicktoons

== Production ==
In mid-2006, Nickelodeon and DreamWorks Animation announced that they would collaborate to create a show based on the Madagascar films. The new series would star the penguins from the film series. Nothing was confirmed on what the series would be about until November 2007.

At first, in November 2007, Nickelodeon advertised a sneak peek of three new Nicktoons coming to the channel, The Mighty B!, Making Fiends, and The Penguins of Madagascar all on November 25, 2007, as part of Superstuffed Nicktoons Weekend. Then, in December 2007, Nickelodeon advertised many events that were going to premiere in 2008 (The Mighty B!, Fairly OddBaby, The Penguins of Madagascar, KCA 2008, "Sidekicks," and "Pest of the West"). Since then, The Penguins of Madagascar premiere was delayed at least twice in 2008. It was most likely delayed to make room for the release of Madagascar: Escape 2 Africa on November 7, 2008. On November 28, Nickelodeon aired an episode from the series as a sneak peek. The series officially debuted 4 months later on March 28, 2009, at 9:30 pm ET/PT. The Double DVD Pack edition of Madagascar: Escape 2 Africa released on February 6, 2009, included an unaired episode of the show called "Popcorn Panic." This episode officially aired on TV 3 months later on May 9, 2009. On December 24, 2013, new episodes of the series were moved to the Nicktoons channel.

The series was co-produced by DreamWorks Animation and the Nickelodeon Animation Studio's Burbank location. Animation services were outsourced to India, New Zealand and Taiwan. The producers were planning on a 26-episode first season, but the episode number was changed to 48.

=== Casting ===
Some of the voice actors who voiced the characters in the films were unable to reprise their roles for the series. Chris Miller, who had voiced Kowalski, was replaced by Jeff Bennett, while Christopher Knights was replaced by James Patrick Stuart for the voice of Private. Danny Jacobs took over from Sacha Baron Cohen as the voice of King Julien, and Cedric the Entertainer's character, Maurice, is now voiced by Kevin Michael Richardson. Tom McGrath, John DiMaggio, Andy Richter and Conrad Vernon reprised their roles of Skipper, Rico, Mort, and Mason for the TV series, respectively. Other characters are voiced by the same actors who had voiced them in the films, while some characters, like Marlene the otter and Alice the zookeeper, are new characters created especially for the series.

== Broadcast ==
=== Nickelodeon debut ===
Nickelodeon aired a "sneak peek" preview of The Penguins of Madagascar in the United States on November 28, 2008, and officially launched the series on March 28, 2009, after the 2009 Kids' Choice Awards.

=== International ===
In Australia, The Penguins of Madagascar premiered on April 18, 2009, on Nickelodeon. In Canada, the series premiered on September 12, 2009, on Nickelodeon Canada and YTV. In Ireland, the series premiered on Nickelodeon Ireland and RTÉ Two on April 12, 2009. The series debuted in Australia and New Zealand on April 18, 2009, on Nickelodeon (Australia and New Zealand). In the United Kingdom, the series premiered on April 12, 2009, on Nickelodeon UK, CITV, and Viva. The series was added to Hulu in June 2018. The series premiered on Duronto TV in Bangladesh on March 1, 2021, alongside Kung Fu Panda: Legends of Awesomeness.

== Critical reception ==
Mary McNamara of the Los Angeles Times gave The Penguins of Madagascar a favorable review. She said that the show had strong comedic timing and action scenes, saying that it recalled both Wile E. Coyote cartoons and 1940s gangster films. Tim Goodman's review in the San Francisco Chronicle is also favorable; he considered the penguins and King Julien as having the most comedic potential from the films, with his review focusing on the voice actors' comedic timing, and said that the show also contained several jokes that would make it appealing to adults.

Brian Lowry of Variety described the show as "loud, exuberant and colorful" and praised its animation quality, but he did not think that it was funny and said that the show seemed more like a "merchandising bonanza."

=== Awards and nominations ===
Year	Association	Category	Nominee	Result
2009	Artios Awards	Outstanding Achievement in Casting – Animation TV Programming	Sarah Noonan, Meredith Layne	Nominated
2009	British Academy Children's Awards	International	Bob Schooley, Mark McCorkle, Bret Haaland	Won
2009	Golden Reel Awards	Best Sound Editing: Television Animation	Episode: "Gone in a Flash"	Nominated
2010	Annie Awards	Best Animated Television Production for Children		Won
2010	Annie Awards	Directing in a Television Production	Bret Haaland (for "Launchtime")	Won
2010	British Academy Children's Awards	International		Won
2010	Daytime Emmy Awards	Outstanding Special Class Animated Program	Bob Schooley, Mark McCorkle, Bret Haaland, Dina Buteyn, Dean Hoff (tied with SpongeBob SquarePants)	Won
2010	Daytime Emmy Awards	Outstanding Achievement in Music Direction and Composition	Adam Berry	Nominated
2010	Daytime Emmy Awards	Outstanding Writing in Animation	Brandon Sawyer, Bill Motz, Bob Roth, Eddie Guzelian, Bob Schooley, Mark McCorkle	Nominated
2010	Daytime Emmy Awards	Outstanding Directing in an Animated Program	Nicholas Filippi, Bret Haaland and Lisa Schaffer	Nominated
2010	Golden Reel Awards	Best Sound Editing: Television Animation	Episode: "What Goes Around"	Won
2010	Kids' Choice Awards	Favorite Cartoon		Nominated
2011	Golden Reel Awards	Best Sound Editing: Sound Effects, Foley, Dialogue and ADR Animation in Television	Episode: "The Lost Treasure of the Golden Squirrel"	Won
2011	Daytime Emmy Awards	Outstanding Achievement in Music Direction and Composition	Adam Berry	Won
2011	Daytime Emmy Awards	Outstanding Achievement in Sound Editing – Live Action and Animation	Jimmy Lifton, Paulette Lifton, Dominick Certo, Ian Nyeste, Matt Hall, Lawrence Reyes	Won
2011	Daytime Emmy Awards	Outstanding Casting for an Animated Series or Special	Meredith Layne	Won
2011	Daytime Emmy Awards	Outstanding Children's Animated Program	Bob Schooley, Mark McCorkle, Bret Haaland, Chris Neuhahn, Dean Hoff, Dina Buteyn	Won
2011	Daytime Emmy Awards	Outstanding Direction in an Animated Program	Nick Filippi, Christo Stamboliev, Dave Knott, Lisa Schaffer	Nominated
2011	Daytime Emmy Awards	Outstanding Performer in an Animated Program	Danny Jacobs (King Julien)	Won
2011	Daytime Emmy Awards	Outstanding Performer in an Animated Program	Tom McGrath (Skipper)	Nominated
2011	Daytime Emmy Awards	Outstanding Writing in Animation	Brandon Sawyer, Bill Motz, Bob Roth	Won
2011	Kids' Choice Awards	Favorite Cartoon		Nominated
2011	BMI Film/TV Awards	Cable Music	Adam Berry	Won
2012	Annie Awards	Best Animated Television Production – Children		Nominated
2012	Annie Awards	Directing in a Television Production	Steve Loter, Christo Stamboliev, Shaun Cashman, David Knott	Nominated
2012	Annie Awards	Music in a Television Production	Adam Berry, Bob Schooley, Mark McCorkle	Nominated
2012	Annie Awards	Voice Acting in a Television Production	Jeff Bennett (Kowalski)	Won
2012	Annie Awards	Editing in Television Production	Ted Machold, Jeff Adams, Doug Tiano, Bob Tomlin	Won
2012	Golden Reel Awards	Best Sound Editing: Sound Effects, Foley, Dialogue and ADR Animation in Television	Episode: "The Return of the Revenge of Dr. Blowhole"	Won
2012	Daytime Emmy Awards	Outstanding Children's Animated Program	Bret Haaland, Mark McCorkle, Bob Schooley, Nick Filippi, Chris Neuhahn, Ant Ward, Andrew Huebner	Won
2012	Daytime Emmy Awards	Outstanding Performer in an Animated Program	Jeff Bennett (Kowalski)	Nominated
2012	Daytime Emmy Awards	Outstanding Directing in an Animated Program	David Knott, Shaun Cashman, Christo Stamboliev, Steve Loter, Lisa Schaffer	Won
2012	Daytime Emmy Awards	Outstanding Achievement in Music Direction and Composition	Adam Berry	Nominated
2012	Daytime Emmy Awards	Outstanding Original Song – Children's and Animation	Adam Berry, John Behnke (for "Off the Clock")	Nominated
2012	Daytime Emmy Awards	Outstanding Original Song – Children's and Animation	Adam Berry, Brandon Sawyer (for "In the Happy Little Land of Hoboken Surprise")	Won
2012	Daytime Emmy Awards	Outstanding Writing in Animation	Bill Motz, Bob Roth, Brandon Sawyer	Nominated
2012	Daytime Emmy Awards	Outstanding Achievement in Sound Editing – Animation	Paulette Lifton, Jimmy Lifton, Adam Berry, Dominick Certo, Michael Petak, D.J. Lynch, Matt Hall, Ian Nyeste, Aran Tanchum, Chris Gresham, Lawrence Reyes	Nominated
2012	Primetime Emmy Awards	Outstanding Animated Program	Bob Schooley & Mark McCorkle, Bret Haaland, Nicholas Filippi, Chris Neuhahn, Ant Ward, Andrew Huebner, Dave Knott, Shaun Cashman, Steve Loter & Christo Stamboliev (episode: "The Return of the Revenge of Dr. Blowhole")	Won
2013	Annie Awards	Best Animated Television Production for Children	Episode: "Action Reaction"	Nominated
2013	Annie Awards	Outstanding Achievement, Music in an Animated Television or other Broadcast Venue Production	Adam Berry (episode: "Private and the Winky Factory")	Nominated
2013	Annie Awards	Outstanding Achievement, Voice Acting in an Animated Television or other Broadcast Venue Production	James Patrick Stuart (for "Private"; episode: "High Moltage")	Nominated
2013	Annie Awards	Outstanding Achievement, Voice Acting in an Animated Television or other Broadcast Venue Production	Tom McGrath (for "Skipper"; episode: "The Otter Woman")	Nominated
2013	Annie Awards	Outstanding Achievement, Writing in an Animated Television or other Broadcast Venue Production	Gabe Garza (episode: "Endangerous Species")	Nominated
2013	Daytime Emmy Awards	Outstanding Children's Animated Program	Bob Schooley, Mark McCorkle, Bret Haaland, Nick Filipini, Ant Ward, Chris Neuhahn and Andrew Huebner	Nominated
2013	Daytime Emmy Awards	Outstanding Directing in an Animated Program	David Knott, Christo Stamboliev, Matt Engstrom, Sunil Hall and Lisa Schaffer	Nominated
2013	Daytime Emmy Awards	Outstanding Music Direction and Composition	Adam Berry	Nominated
2013	Daytime Emmy Awards	Outstanding Writing in Animation	Bill Motz, Bob Roth and Brandon Sawyer	Nominated
2013	Daytime Emmy Awards	Outstanding Sound Mixing – Animation	Justin Brinsfield, D.J. Lynch and Ian Nyeste	Nominated

== In other media ==
=== Film ===
A spin-off film featuring the penguins had been in the works since 2005, when the first film had been released, with a release date planned for 2009. In March 2011, DreamWorks announced that the four penguin characters would be given their own feature film, to be directed by Simon J. Smith (the co-director of Bee Movie), produced by Lara Breay and written by Alan J. Schoolcraft and Brent Simons (the writers of Megamind). In July 2012, at Comic-Con, it was announced that the film, tentatively titled The Penguins of Madagascar, would be released in 2015. Robert Schooley, one of the producers of the show, said that the film will be unrelated to the TV show of the same name, but he did say that could always change. In September 2012, DreamWorks Animation and 20th Century Fox, which became the studio's then-new distributor after the end of their distribution deal with Nickelodeon's sister studio Paramount Pictures, announced the release date for March 27, 2015, and a new pair of writers, Michael Colton and John Aboud. In August 2013, it was reported that Benedict Cumberbatch would voice Agent Classified from the North Wind and John Malkovich voiced the film's charming villain, Dr. Octavius Brine/Dave. On May 20, 2014, the film's release date was moved up to November 26, 2014, switching places with DreamWorks Animation's other film Home.

The film received mixed reviews from critics and audiences, and despite grossing $374 million worldwide on a $132 million budget, underperformed at the box office, causing DreamWorks to take a $57.1 million write-down on behalf of the film, along with another DreamWorks Animation film released earlier that year, Mr. Peabody & Sherman.

=== Toys ===
DreamWorks licensed a number of manufacturers to create products for the show, including Hooga Loo Toys, which had a successful run creating a line of plush toys associated with the second Madagascar film. Based on its success, Hooga Loo was granted a license to create an entirely new toy line for the new series. Hooga Loo recruited the creative development team, Pangea Corporation, the company who assisted Playmates Toys in the development of the very successful Teenage Mutant Ninja Turtles, to work systemically with DreamWorks and develop toys inspired by the series. The toy line included a full range of plush characters, as well as collectible figures and wacky vehicles. Fast food restaurants courted DreamWorks to glean the rights for a QSR deal, which finally materialized in late 2009. McDonald's had produced a line of toys based on the second film; this relationship forged a new deal with them.

Licensed merchandise based on the show began debuting in January 2010. In the following month, McDonald's began their "Mission: Play" Happy Meal toy campaign, which featured eight toys based on the penguins in the series.

=== Video games ===
- The Penguins of Madagascar video game is a Nintendo DS action-adventure game based on the TV show of the same name. The game was released by THQ on November 2, 2010, and was developed by Griptonite Games.
- The Penguins of Madagascar: Dr. Blowhole Returns – Again! was released by THQ on September 6, 2011, for Wii, Xbox 360, PlayStation 3, and Nintendo DS.

== Rejected revival series ==
On January 11, 2026, X user Alb3rt0 reported that Kade Byrand, who was a visual development artist for Spider-Man: Beyond the Spider-Verse, had pitched a revival of the show to DreamWorks Animation Television, but ultimately got rejected later on.
