= The Penguins of Madagascar (video game) =

2010 video game

- Developer(s): Griptonite Games
- Publisher(s): THQ
- Series: Madagascar
- Platform(s): Nintendo DS
- Release: NA: November 2, 2010; EU: November 19, 2010
- Genre(s): Action
- Mode(s): Single-player

The Penguins of Madagascar is a video game developed by Griptonite Games and released on Nintendo DS on November 2, 2010, with additional minigames utilizing the camera on Nintendo DSi systems. The game is based on DreamWorks and Nickelodeon's The Penguins of Madagascar animated television series, and is unrelated to DreamWorks' Penguins of Madagascar film. The game received a successor, The Penguins of Madagascar: Dr. Blowhole Returns – Again!, in September 2011 for most gaming platforms.

== Overview ==
The game's plot involves the penguins throwing King Julien a party, finding Mort, and removing snow from their zoo. Players must switch between each of the four penguins, or all of them stacked together, in order to traverse the overhead-angled environments and solve puzzles. The game also features unlockable minigames, allows players to adorn the penguins' hideout with decorations, and a Nintendo DSi exclusive-mode that lets King Julien critique photographs taken with the system's camera.

== Critical reception ==
Common Sense Media gave the game 4 stars out of 5, writing "The strategic puzzle-solving format is a fantastic way to bring The Penguins of Madagascar into the video game world. It was a pleasantly unexpected choice on the part of the developers, and such a better one than if they'd simply given us a game about penguins waddling along and smacking enemies. Kids will really have to put on their thinking caps for these fun, brain-teasing levels -- but remembering that the audience here will be younger kids, the developers didn't go crazy with any way-too-difficult challenges. They're all fun, but do-able -- which is great. And the invention-creating mini-games break things up nicely (although you will have to put together the same darn bridge way too many times). Along the way, you can collect snow cones that can be used to purchase mini-games, which also provides a nice break from the strategic planning." Kidsworld gave it 4/5 stars, writing " This is a great game that can be played for short intervals of time and then picked up at a later date".
