= Madagascar (franchise) =

DreamWorks Animation media franchise

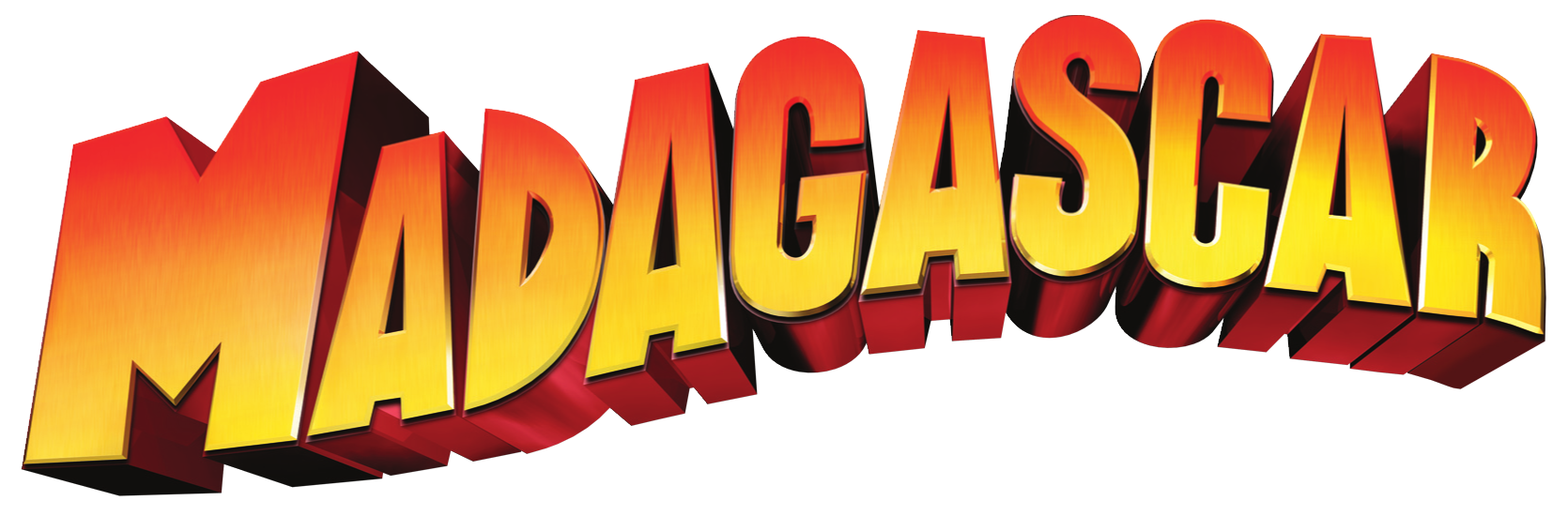
- Franchise title as seen in Madagascar: Escape 2 Africa
- Created by: Mark Burton; Billy Frolick; Tom McGrath; Eric Darnell
- Original work: Madagascar (2005)
- Owners: DreamWorks Animation (Universal Pictures (Note: DreamWorks Pictures, DreamWorks Animation's former parent company and distribution partner, distributed the first film, while Paramount Pictures distributed the second and third films, and 20th Century Fox distributed spin-off Penguins of Madagascar as part of DreamWorks Animation's distribution deals with Paramount from 2006 to 2012 and Fox from 2013 to 2017. The distribution rights to future Madagascar movies would move to Universal Studios following its acquisition by NBCUniversal in 2016.))
- Years: 2005–present

Films and television
- Films: Madagascar (2005); Escape 2 Africa (2008); Europe's Most Wanted (2012); Spin-off film(s): Penguins of Madagascar (2014)
- Short films: The Madagascar Penguins in a Christmas Caper (2005); Madly Madagascar (2013)
- Animated series: The Penguins of Madagascar (2008–2015); All Hail King Julien (2014–2017); All Hail King Julien: Exiled (2017); Madagascar: A Little Wild (2020–2022)
- Television special: Merry Madagascar (2009)

Theatrical presentations
- Play: Madagascar Live! (2011–2013)
- Musical: Madagascar: The Musical (2018)

Games
- Video games: Madagascar (2005); Operation Penguin (2005); Escape 2 Africa (2008); Madagascar Kartz (2009); The Penguins of Madagascar (2010); The Penguins of Madagascar: Dr. Blowhole Returns – Again! (2011); Madagascar 3: The Video Game (2012); Penguins of Madagascar (2014); DreamWorks Universe of Legends (2017); DreamWorks All-Star Kart Racing (2023)

Audio
- Soundtracks: Madagascar (2005); Escape 2 Africa (2008); Europe's Most Wanted (2012); Spin-off film soundtrack(s): Penguins of Madagascar (2014)

Miscellaneous
- Theme park attractions: Madagascar: A Crate Adventure (2011–2022); King Julien's Beach Party-Go-Round (2011–2022); Madagascar Madness (2012–2023)

Official website
- www.dreamworks.com/movies/madagascar

Madagascar is an American media franchise of DreamWorks Animation. It began in 2005 with the release of the animated feature film of the same name, followed by Madagascar: Escape 2 Africa in 2008 and Madagascar 3: Europe's Most Wanted in 2012. A spin-off film featuring the penguins, titled Penguins of Madagascar, was released in 2014. A fourth main film, Madagascar 4, was announced for 2018, but has since been removed from its schedule indefinitely due to the studio's restructuring in 2015.

The overall plot through the series revolves around the adventures of four anthropomorphic Central Park Zoo animals who have spent their lives in blissful captivity and are unexpectedly shipped back to Kenya initially but are shipwrecked on an uninhabited Madagascar. Now they must struggle to survive while attempting to return to New York City with the help of a crafty cadre of Adélie penguins and with many other characters along the way. The voices of Ben Stiller, Chris Rock, David Schwimmer and Jada Pinkett Smith are featured in the films. The franchise's films have received mixed-to-positive critical reviews.

== Films ==
Film	U.S. release date	Directors	Screenwriters	Story by	Producer(s)
Main series
Madagascar	May 27, 2005	Tom McGrath & Eric Darnell	Tom McGrath, Mark Burton, Eric Darnell & Billy Frolick	Tom McGrath, Mark Burton, Eric Darnell & Billy Frolick	Mireille Soria
Madagascar: Escape 2 Africa	November 7, 2008	Tom McGrath & Eric Darnell	Etan Cohen, Tom McGrath & Eric Darnell	Etan Cohen, Tom McGrath & Eric Darnell	Mark Swift & Mireille Soria
Madagascar 3: Europe's Most Wanted	June 8, 2012	Tom McGrath, Eric Darnell & Conrad Vernon	Eric Darnell & Noah Baumbach	Eric Darnell & Noah Baumbach	Mark Swift & Mireille Soria
Spin-off
Penguins of Madagascar	November 26, 2014	Eric Darnell & Simon J. Smith	John Aboud, Brandon Sawyer & Michael Colton	John Aboud, Brent Simons, Michael Colton & Alan Schoolcraft	Lara Breay & Mark Swift

=== Main films ===
==== Madagascar (2005) ====
Madagascar is a 2005 animated comedy film and the first film in the series. Directed by Eric Darnell and Tom McGrath, the film tells the story of four Central Park Zoo animals: Alex the lion (Ben Stiller), Marty the zebra (Chris Rock), Melman the giraffe (David Schwimmer) and Gloria the hippo (Jada Pinkett Smith). These animals have spent their lives in comfortable captivity and are unexpectedly shipwrecked on the island of Madagascar.

The film was a commercial success, grossing over $532 million worldwide.

==== Madagascar: Escape 2 Africa (2008) ====
Madagascar: Escape 2 Africa is a 2008 animated comedy/adventure film and the sequel to the 2005 film Madagascar. Directed by Eric Darnell and Tom McGrath, the film continues the adventures of Alex, Marty, Melman and Gloria, who try to fly back to New York, but they crash-land in Kenya, where Alex is reunited with his parents Zuba (Bernie Mac) and Florrie (Sherri Shepherd). However, Zuba's rival Makunga (Alec Baldwin) is plotting to overthrow Zuba as alpha lion of his pride.

The film grossed over $603 million worldwide, which is higher than its predecessor.

==== Madagascar 3: Europe's Most Wanted (2012) ====
Madagascar 3: Europe's Most Wanted is a 2012 animated comedy film, and the third installment in the series, directed by Eric Darnell and Tom McGrath, along with Conrad Vernon. Alex, Marty, Gloria and Melman are still struggling to get home to New York. This time, their journey takes them to Europe where they purchase a failing traveling circus as they become close friends with the staff like Stefano the sea lion (Martin Short), Vitaly the tiger (Bryan Cranston), Gia the jaguar (Jessica Chastain) and Sonya the bear (Frank Welker), King Julien's (Sacha Baron Cohen) true love. Together, they spectacularly revitalize the business even as the fanatical Monaco Animal Control officer Captain Chantel DuBois (Frances McDormand) relentlessly pursues them. In the end, the zoo animals finally get back to New York, only to find that they have grown too much in spirit to return to captivity and decide to stay with the circus instead.

The film grossed over $746 million worldwide, and was the highest-grossing film in the series.

==== Untitled fourth Madagascar film (TBA) ====
DreamWorks Animation CEO Jeffrey Katzenberg said in December 2010 that a fourth installment in the franchise was likely, stating: "Ultimately they will come back to New York, and they will come to terms with that, which they will do in this next chapter. Because of the way that movie concludes there's probably one more for them." However, in June 2012, DreamWorks Animation's head of worldwide marketing, Anne Globe, said, "It's too early to tell. There hasn't been a lot of discussion about that." A month later, Eric Darnell, who co-directed all three films, spoke about the possibility of the fourth film, noting, "Two things have to happen. One is that the world has to want Madagascar 4, because if they don't want it, it doesn't matter what we do. And the other thing is even if the world wants Madagascar 4, we have to make sure that we have an idea that is incredible, that is great, that is unexpected. If the audience wants it and we have a great idea, we will see – maybe." In June 2014, Madagascar 4 was scheduled to be released on May 18, 2018. In January 2015, the film was removed from the release schedule following a corporate restructuring and DreamWorks Animation's new policy to release two films a year. In April 2017, Tom McGrath stated about the film: "There are things in the works, nothing is announced yet, but I think they'll show their faces once more..." In January 2026, McGrath stated that DreamWorks still wants to make a fourth Madagascar film as long as there is a good story to tell.

=== Spin-off film ===
==== Penguins of Madagascar (2014) ====
A spin-off film featuring the penguins had been in the works since 2005, when the first Madagascar film had been released, with a release date planned for 2009. In March 2011, it was announced that the penguin characters would be given their own feature film, similar to the 2011 Puss in Boots movie, to be directed by Simon J. Smith (the co-director of Bee Movie), produced by Lara Breay and written by Alan J. Schoolcraft and Brent Simons (the writers of DreamWorks' Megamind). In July 2012, at Comic-Con, it was announced that the film, titled The Penguins of Madagascar, would be released in 2015. Robert Schooley, one of the producers of The Penguins series, said that the film will be unrelated to the TV series of the same name, but he did say that could always change. In September 2012, 20th Century Fox and DreamWorks Animation announced the release date for March 27, 2015, and a new pair of writers, Michael Colton and John Aboud. In August 2013, it was reported that Benedict Cumberbatch would voice Agent Classified from the North Wind and John Malkovich the film's charming villain, Dr. Octavius Brine/Dave. On May 20, 2014, the film's release date was moved up to November 26, 2014, switching places with DreamWorks Animation's other film Home.

The film, despite grossing $374 million worldwide on a $132 million budget, underperformed at the box office, causing DreamWorks Animation to take a $57.1 million write-down on behalf of the film, along with another underperforming DreamWorks Animation film released earlier that year, Mr. Peabody & Sherman.

== Television series ==
Series	Season	Episodes		Originally released		
Series	Season	Episodes		First released	Last released	Network
The Penguins of Madagascar	1	48		November 28, 2008	February 15, 2010	Nickelodeon
The Penguins of Madagascar	2	68		March 13, 2010	March 31, 2012	Nickelodeon
The Penguins of Madagascar	3	33	26	April 16, 2012	November 10, 2012	Nickelodeon
The Penguins of Madagascar	3	33	7	December 24, 2013	December 19, 2015	Nicktoons
All Hail King Julien	1	10	5	December 19, 2014		Netflix
All Hail King Julien	1	10	5	April 3, 2015		Netflix
All Hail King Julien	2	16		October 16, 2015		Netflix
All Hail King Julien	3	13		June 17, 2016		Netflix
All Hail King Julien	4	13		November 11, 2016		Netflix
All Hail King Julien	Exiled	13		May 12, 2017		Netflix
All Hail King Julien	5	13		December 1, 2017		Netflix
Madagascar: A Little Wild	1	6		September 7, 2020		Hulu / Peacock
Madagascar: A Little Wild	2	6		December 11, 2020		Hulu / Peacock
Madagascar: A Little Wild	3	7		May 27, 2021		Hulu / Peacock
Madagascar: A Little Wild	4	6		August 6, 2021		Hulu / Peacock
Madagascar: A Little Wild	5	6		November 11, 2021		Hulu / Peacock
Madagascar: A Little Wild	6	6		January 13, 2022		Hulu / Peacock
Madagascar: A Little Wild	7	6		April 4, 2022		Hulu / Peacock
Madagascar: A Little Wild	8	7		June 30, 2022		Hulu / Peacock

=== The Penguins of Madagascar (2008–2015) ===
The Penguins of Madagascar is an animated spin-off television series that aired on Nickelodeon. The series follows the adventures of the four penguins: Skipper (the leader of the group), Kowalski (the smartest), Rico (the craziest) and Private (the youngest) after the events of the second film in New York City's Central Park Zoo. The penguins rule the roost at their Central Park habitat, carrying out secret missions in the heart of the city. At times, their missions beckon them to venture outside the zoo. King Julien is also a resident of the zoo (though it is unknown how he, Maurice, and Mort got there) and the penguins must compete against him to maintain order in the zoo. While Tom McGrath, John DiMaggio, Conrad Vernon and Andy Richter reprised their roles as Skipper, Rico, Mason and Mort respectively, Jeff Bennett replaced Chris Miller as Kowalski, James Patrick Stuart replaced Christopher Knights as Private, Danny Jacobs replaced Sacha Baron Cohen as Julien and Kevin Michael Richardson replaced Cedric the Entertainer as Maurice. The series also features several new characters, including Marlene, an otter voiced by Nicole Sullivan.

=== All Hail King Julien (2014–2017) ===
All Hail King Julien is the second animated spin-off television series. It stars King Julien and set before the events of the first film. The series debuted on December 19, 2014, on Netflix, when the first five 22-minute episodes were released. The series features the voices of Danny Jacobs (replacing Sacha Baron Cohen and reprising his role from The Penguins of Madagascar) as King Julien; Henry Winkler as Julien's regal predecessor, Uncle King Julien; Andy Richter as Mort; Kevin Michael Richardson (replacing Cedric the Entertainer and reprising his role from The Penguins of Madagascar) as Maurice; and India de Beaufort as Clover, the king's special-ops expert.

=== Madagascar: A Little Wild (2020–2022) ===
Madagascar: A Little Wild is the third animated television series that premiered on Hulu and Peacock on September 7, 2020. It's the second prequel in the franchise, centering on the younger versions of the four main characters that first appeared in Madagascar (2005), and the first television series in the franchise starring them (though Alex has made one-off appearances in previous series).

== Short films ==
=== The Madagascar Penguins in a Christmas Caper (2005) ===
The Madagascar Penguins in a Christmas Caper is an animated short film, which premiered in theaters on October 7, 2005, with the stop-motion film, Wallace & Gromit: The Curse of the Were-Rabbit. The short was directed by animation veteran Gary Trousdale, produced by Teresa Cheng, and written by Michael Lachance. Set on Christmas Eve, the 12-minute film features four penguins from Central Park Zoo who discover that one of them has gone missing.

=== Madly Madagascar (2013) ===
Madly Madagascar is a direct-to-DVD Valentine's Day-themed short film released on January 29, 2013, starring all the main characters from the Madagascar film series. The story appears to take place some time before the end of the second film. It featured many of the same voice actors as the films, including Ben Stiller, Chris Rock, David Schwimmer, and Jada Pinkett Smith. However, voice actor Danny Jacobs once again replaced Sacha Baron Cohen as the voice of the character King Julien. Its plot centers around King Julien who finds a love potion and starts selling it to members of the watering hole, including Marty who instantly becomes attractive to all the females. Skipper and the penguins organize a rescue mission for his doll girlfriend and Melman tries to make his first Valentines Day with Gloria special.

=== All Hail King Julien: New Year's Eve Countdown (2017) ===
All Hail King Julien: New Year's Eve Countdown is a three-minute animated film about celebrating the new year in Madagascar.

=== All Hail King Julien: Happy Birthday to You (2017) ===
All Hail King Julien: Happy Birthday to You is a one-minute animated special.

== Television special ==
=== Merry Madagascar (2009) ===
Merry Madagascar is a Christmas special first broadcast on NBC in November 2009, which starred the characters from the Madagascar film series. The story appears to take place sometime between the first and second films. It featured many of the same voice actors as the films, including Ben Stiller, Chris Rock, David Schwimmer, and Jada Pinkett Smith. However, voice actor Danny Jacobs replaced Sacha Baron Cohen as the voice of the character King Julien. Carl Reiner provided the voice of Santa Claus. Santa Claus crash lands in his sleigh on Madagascar and loses his memory after Alex shoots him down, leaving him, Marty, Gloria and Melman to be Santa for the night. King Julien realizes that Christmas is about giving and not receiving.

== Cast and characters ==
List indicators

This section includes characters who will appear or have appeared in more than two films in the series.

- An empty grey cell indicates the character was not in the film, or that the character's official presence has not yet been confirmed.
- ^{A} indicates an appearance through archival footage or audio.
- ^{Y} indicates a younger version of the character.

Characters	Main films			Short films		Television series			Television special	Spin-off film
Characters	Madagascar	Madagascar: Escape 2 Africa	Madagascar 3: Europe's Most Wanted	The Madagascar Penguins in a Christmas Caper	Madly Madagascar	The Penguins of Madagascar	All Hail King Julien	Madagascar: A Little Wild	Merry Madagascar	Penguins of Madagascar
Alex	Ben Stiller	Ben Stiller Quinn Dempsey Stiller^{Y} Declan Swift^{Y}	Ben Stiller	Silent roles	Ben Stiller	Wally Wingert	Crispin Freeman	Tucker Chandler	Ben Stiller	Ben Stiller^{A}
Marty	Chris Rock	Chris Rock Thomas Stanley^{Y}	Chris Rock	Silent roles	Chris Rock			Amir O'Neil	Chris Rock	Chris Rock^{A}
Melman Mankiewicz	David Schwimmer	David Schwimmer Zachary Gordon^{Y}	David Schwimmer	Silent roles	David Schwimmer			Luke Lowe	David Schwimmer	David Schwimmer^{A}
Gloria	Jada Pinkett Smith	Jada Pinkett Smith Willow Smith^{Y}	Jada Pinkett Smith	Silent roles	Jada Pinkett Smith			Shaylin Becton	Jada Pinkett Smith	Jada Pinkett Smith^{A}
King Julien XIII	Sacha Baron Cohen	Sacha Baron Cohen	Sacha Baron Cohen		Danny Jacobs	Danny Jacobs	Danny Jacobs		Danny Jacobs	Danny Jacobs Sacha Baron Cohen^{A}
Skipper	Tom McGrath	Tom McGrath	Tom McGrath	Tom McGrath	Tom McGrath	Tom McGrath			Tom McGrath	Tom McGrath
Kowalski	Chris Miller	Chris Miller	Chris Miller	Chris Miller	Chris Miller	Jeff Bennett			Chris Miller	Chris Miller
Rico	Jeffrey Katzenberg	John DiMaggio	John DiMaggio	John DiMaggio	Silent	John DiMaggio			Silent	Conrad Vernon
Private	Christopher Knights	Christopher Knights	Christopher Knights	Christopher Knights	Christopher Knights	James Patrick Stuart			Christopher Knights	Christopher Knights
Maurice	Cedric the Entertainer	Cedric the Entertainer	Cedric the Entertainer		Cedric the Entertainer	Kevin Michael Richardson	Kevin Michael Richardson		Cedric the Entertainer	
Mort	Andy Richter	Andy Richter	Andy Richter		Andy Richter	Andy Richter	Andy Richter		Andy Richter	Andy Richter
Mason	Conrad Vernon	Conrad Vernon	Conrad Vernon	Silent	Conrad Vernon	Conrad Vernon				
Phil	Character is mute, uses sign language	Character is mute, uses sign language	Character is mute, uses sign language	Silent cameo	Character is mute, uses sign language	Character is mute, uses sign language				
Nana	Elisa Gabrielli	Elisa Gabrielli		Elisa Gabrielli						
The Fossa	Tom McGrath and Eric Darnell					Dee Bradley Baker	Various voices			
Willie	Cody Cameron						Jeff Bennett			
Zuba		Bernie Mac								
Florrie		Sherri Shepherd								
Makunga		Alec Baldwin								
Moto Moto		will.i.am								
Captain Chantel DuBois			Frances McDormand							
Vitaly			Bryan Cranston							Photograph
Gia			Jessica Chastain							
Stefano			Martin Short							
Sonya			Frank Welker							
Ted	Silent cameo			Bill Fagerbakke		Silent				
Okapi					Taraji P. Henson					
Marlene						Nicole Sullivan Dee Bradley Baker (Note: Baker provides the voice of Marlene when she is in her Wild form. A form she takes when is outside of the New York Zoo.)				
Alice						Mary Scheer				
Santa Claus						Carl Reiner			Carl Reiner	
Todd							Kevin Michael Richardson	JP Karliak		
Cupid									Nina Dobrev	
Lead Reindeer									Jim Cummings	
Dave / Dr. Octavius Brine										John Malkovich
Classified										Benedict Cumberbatch
Short Fuse										Ken Jeong
Eva										Annet Mahendru
Corporal										Peter Stormare
Clover							India De Beaufort			
Xixi							Betsy Sodaro			
Masikura							Debra Wilson			
King Julien XII							Henry Winkler			
Karl							Dwight Schultz			
Timo	Chris Miller						David Krumholtz			
Babak/Sage Moondancer							Jeff Bennett			
Ted (lemur)	Conrad Vernon						Andy Richter			
Pancho	David P. Smith						Danny Jacobs			
Dorothy							Sarah Thyre			
Hector	Eric Darnell						Jeff Bennett			
Horst	Eric Darnell						Jeff Bennett			
Abner	Jeffrey Katzenberg						Diedrich Bader			
Becca	David P. Smith						Sarah Thyre			
Todd (lemur)							Kevin Michael Richardson			
King Koto							Maurice LaMarche			
Ant'ney								Eric Petersen		
Pickles								Candace Kozak (Note: They communicate using sign language)		
Dave								Candace Kozak		
Kate								Jasmine Gatewood		
Murray								Charlie Adler		
Mille								Johanna Stein		
Carlos								Eric Lopez		
Ranger Hoof								Da'Vine Joy Randolph		
Lucia								Myrna Velasco		
Lala								Grace Lu		
First Policeman			Tom McGrath							
Second Policeman			Conrad Vernon							
Comandante			Eric Darnell							
Fourth Policeman			Stephen Kearin							
Esmeralda			Paz Vega							
Casino Security			Dan O'Connor							
Joe the Giraffe		Eric Darnell								
Co-Pilot	Silent cameo	Silent cameo			David Soren		Silent			

== Crew ==
Crew/detail	Main films			Spin-off film
Crew/detail	Madagascar	Madagascar: Escape 2 Africa	Madagascar 3: Europe's Most Wanted	Penguins of Madagascar
Director(s)	Eric Darnell; Tom McGrath	Eric Darnell; Tom McGrath	Eric Darnell; Conrad Vernon; Tom McGrath	Eric Darnell; Simon J. Smith
Producer(s)	Mireille Soria	Mireille Soria; Mark Swift	Mireille Soria; Mark Swift	Lara Breay; Mark Swift
Writer(s)	Mark Burton; Billy Frolick; Eric Darnell; Tom McGrath	Etan Cohen; Eric Darnell; Tom McGrath	Eric Darnell; Noah Baumbach	Screenplay by: Michael Colton; John Aboud; Brandon Sawyer Story by: Alan J. Schoolcraft; Brent Simons; Michael Colton; John Aboud
Composer(s)	Hans Zimmer	Hans Zimmer will.i.am	Hans Zimmer	Lorne Balfe
Editor(s)	H. Lee Peterson	H. Lee Peterson	Nick Fletcher	Nick Kenway
Distributor(s)	DreamWorks Pictures	Paramount Pictures	Paramount Pictures	20th Century Fox

== Reception ==
=== Box office performance ===
The film series has grossed over $2.2 billion, making it the ninth highest-grossing animated franchise and the third highest-grossing DreamWorks Animation franchise (behind Shrek and Kung Fu Panda).

Film	Release date	Revenue			All-time rank		Budget	Reference
Film	Release date	North America	Other territories	Worldwide	Domestic	Worldwide	Budget	Reference
Madagascar	May 27, 2005	$193,595,521	$348,468,325	$542,063,846	#247	#219	$75 million	
Escape 2 Africa	November 7, 2008	$180,010,950	$423,889,404	$603,900,354	#287	#189	$150 million	
Europe's Most Wanted	June 8, 2012	$216,391,482	$530,529,792	$746,921,274	#199	#129	$145 million	
Madagascar trilogy		$589,997,953	$1,302,887,521	$1,892,885,474			$370 million	
Penguins of Madagascar	November 26, 2014	$83,850,911	$289,664,710	$373,515,621	#997	#400	$132 million	
Total		$673,848,864	$1,592,552,231	$2,266,401,095	#25	#24	$502 million	

=== Critical and public response ===
The series is notable for its steadily improving critical reception, with each mainline film receiving better reviews than the last. Its reception among audiences has remained consistently positive throughout its run.

Critical and public response of Madagascar films
Film	Critical		Public
Film	Rotten Tomatoes	Metacritic	CinemaScore
Madagascar	56% (185 reviews)	57 (36 reviews)	A−
Madagascar: Escape 2 Africa	64% (153 reviews)	61 (25 reviews)	A−
Madagascar 3: Europe's Most Wanted	77% (127 reviews)	60 (26 reviews)	A
Penguins of Madagascar	74% (115 reviews)	53 (31 reviews)	A−

=== Critics' Choice Movie Awards ===
Category	Madagascar	Escape 2 Africa	Europe's Most Wanted
Best Animated Feature	Nominated	Nominated	Nominated

== Video games ==
- Madagascar video game was an adaptation of the first film, released in 2005 by Toys for Bob on the PlayStation 2, Xbox, Microsoft Windows, and GameCube consoles.
- Madagascar was released in 2005 by Vicarious Visions on the Nintendo DS and Game Boy Advance.
- Madagascar: Operation Penguin was released in 2005 for Game Boy Advance by Activision.
- Madagascar: Animal Trivia DVD Game is an interactive DVD game based on the first film. It was released in 2005 by the b Equal Company. The DVD features over 1,600 questions about animals. The DVD also features Dynamic Leveling which automatically adjusts the difficulty of the questions to each player's knowledge levels. The three levels are Scout Level for 6–9 years, Explorer Levels for 10–13 years and Navigator Level for 14–106 years.
- Madagascar: Escape 2 Africa was an adaptation of the second film and was made for the Xbox 360, PlayStation 3, Wii, PlayStation 2, Microsoft Windows, and Nintendo DS and released on November 4, 2008, in North America.
- Madagascar: Escape 2 Africa was released for the Nintendo DS and released on November 4, 2008, in North America by Griptonite Games.
- Madagascar Kartz was released on October 27, 2009, for the Wii, PlayStation 3, Xbox 360, and Nintendo DS.
- The Penguins of Madagascar was released on November 2, 2010, for Nintendo DS.
- The Penguins of Madagascar: Dr. Blowhole Returns – Again! was released on September 6, 2011, for Wii, Xbox 360, PlayStation 3, and Nintendo DS.
- DreamWorks Super Star Kartz was released by Activision on November 15, 2011, for PlayStation 3, Xbox 360, Wii, Nintendo DS and Nintendo 3DS. The game features 14 different characters from the four DreamWorks' films – Madagascar, Shrek, How to Train Your Dragon, and Monsters vs. Aliens.
- Madagascar: Join the Circus!, a mobile video game, was released on June 4, 2012, for iPhone and iPad.
- Madagascar 3: The Video Game was released on June 5, 2012, for Wii, Nintendo 3DS, Nintendo DS, Xbox 360, and PlayStation 3.
- Madagascar Online, a virtual online world within the JumpStart universe, was released on October 4, 2012.
- Madagascar Preschool Surf n' Slide, a mobile learning game, was released by JumpStart on October 4, 2012, on iOS and Android platforms.
- Penguins of Madagascar, a video game based on the film of the same name, was published by Little Orbit and released on November 25, 2014, for Nintendo 3DS, Wii, and Wii U.
- DreamWorks All-Star Kart Racing is a racing video game that is published by GameMill Entertainment, and includes Alex and King Julien as playable racers. The video game was released on November 3, 2023, for Nintendo Switch, PlayStation 5, PlayStation 4, Microsoft Windows, Xbox Series X and Series S, and Xbox One.

== Madagascar Live! ==
There have been multiple live shows based on the franchise.

=== Madagascar Live! (2011) ===
Madagascar Live! is a 90-minute theatre show based on the Madagascar film. Produced by DreamWorks Theatricals and Broadway Across America, it was directed by Gip Hoppe as the DreamWorks Animation's second stage production after Shrek the Musical. The tour started on January 28, 2011, in York, Pennsylvania, and was expected to visit more than 70 cities across the United States. After a show in New York's Radio City Music Hall, on April 24, 2011, Madagascar Live! was cancelled in the United States, citing "unforeseen circumstances" as the reason. Madagascar Live! then toured the United Kingdom, visiting nine cities between January 2013 and March 2013.

=== Madagascar Live! Prepare to Party (2012) ===
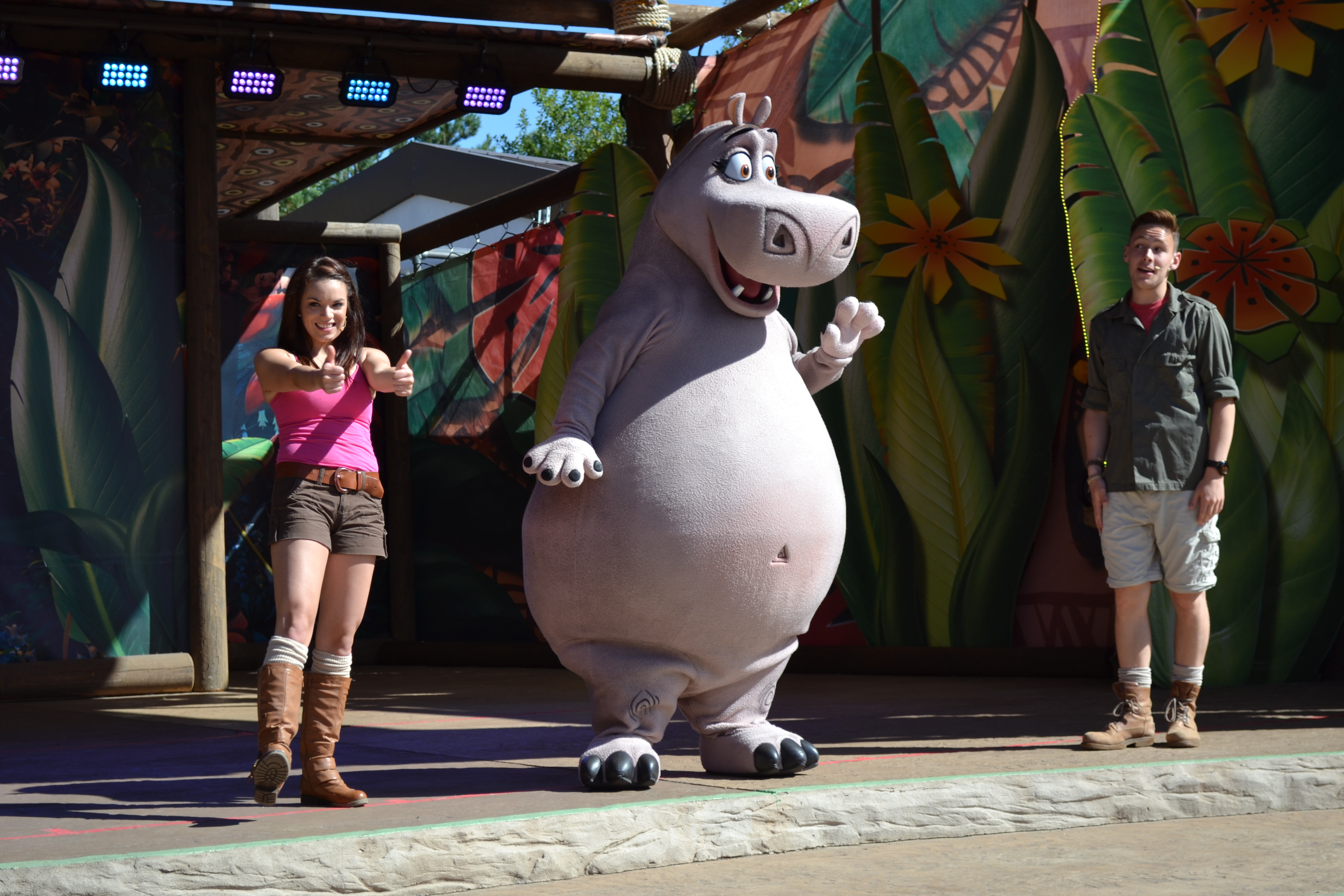
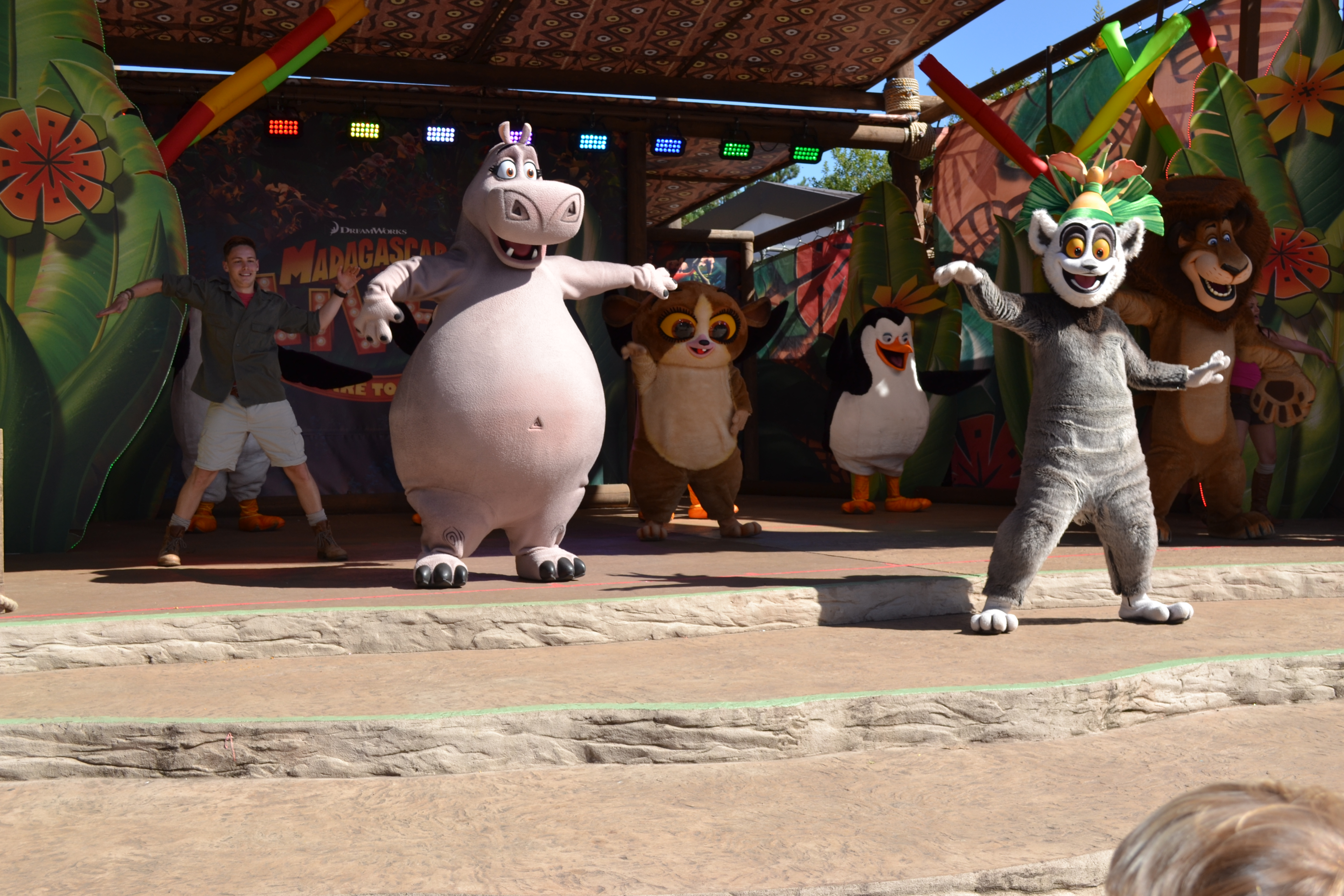
Madagascar Live! Prepare to Party at Chessington World of Adventures Resort

Madagascar Live! Prepare to Party is a 20-minute live stage show featuring Alex, King Julien, Gloria, Mort and The Penguins as they each present their special party games while dancing and singing. The show premiered in 2012 in an Africa area at the UK theme park Chessington World of Adventures, and in DreamWorks Experience at the Australian theme park Dreamworld. The show closed at Chessington in 2014 and at Dreamworld when DreamWorks Experience was rethemed as Kenny and Belinda's Dreamland in 2023.

=== Madagascar Live! It's Circus Time (2012) ===
Madagascar Live! It's Circus Time is a 30-minute live show, based on the film Madagascar 3: Europe's Most Wanted. The story follows the characters of Madagascar to a circus, where they try to avoid being captured by the animal control officer Captain Dubois by blending among its artists, performing stunts, singing and dancing. The show opened in 2012, in Everland Resort, in South Korea, and in 2013 in Heide Park, Germany, and in Gardaland, Italy.

=== Madagascar Live! Operation: Vacation (2013) ===
Madagascar Live! Operation: Vacation is a 20-minute live stage show featuring Alex, Gloria, King Julien, Mort and The Penguins along with live singers, a live band and dancers. The show opened in 2013 at Busch Gardens Tampa and SeaWorld San Diego. The show closed at SeaWorld in January 2015 and at Busch Gardens in September 2015.

=== Madagascar: The Musical (2018) ===
In 2018, a stage musical titled Madagascar The Musical debuted in the United Kingdom. Since then, it also played in Malaysia, Hong Kong, , New Zealand. and Australia.

=== Madagascar: A Musical Adventure (2027) ===
In February 2026, it was announced that Madagascar LIVE would tour all three UK resorts operated by Butlin's in 2027 as part of the company's headline entertainment programme for the year. The production is scheduled to be exclusive to Butlin's holiday parks, marking a major addition to the brand's family-focused live theatre offering.

According to the resorts' official website, "Get ready to 'move it, move it!' as Madagascar – A Musical Adventure brings the smash DreamWorks film to life in a fun-filled show for the whole family. Join Alex the Lion, Marty the Zebra, Melman the Giraffe, Gloria the Hippo and those hilarious, scheming penguins as they escape from New York's Central Park Zoo and find themselves on a wild journey to the wacky world of King Julien's Madagascar. Packed with big characters, catchy songs and plenty of laugh-out-loud moments, this crack-a-lackin' show will have you smiling and waving from start to finish."

The tour forms part of Butlin's continued investment in exclusive live productions, combining well-known family franchises with large-scale stage adaptations tailored specifically for its resort audiences.

== Attractions ==
Madagascar Madness was one of the three areas at the DreamWorks Experience themed land which was part of Australian theme park Dreamworld. It consisted of suspended roller coaster Escape from Madagascar, a show stage King Julien's Theatre in the Wild, a ball play area MAD Jungle Jam and a merchandise shop Madagascar Cargo Hold. The area was replaced by a section of Kenny and Belinda's Dreamland in early 2023.

A Madagascar-themed tower called Madagascar Rain Forest with 15 water slides opened at DreamWorks Water Park on October 1, 2020.

Madagascar was one of the seven themed lands in Universal Studios Singapore, and it featured lush tropical jungles as well as a water ride Madagascar: A Crate Adventure and a carousel King Julien's Beach Party-Go-Round. It closed on March 27, 2022, to make room for Minion Land (containing Despicable Me Minion Mayhem) and Super Nintendo World.

== Music ==
The 1993 music track "I Like to Move It", performed by Reel 2 Real, is featured prominently in the film series. The first film used a version recorded by Sacha Baron Cohen in character as King Julien. Other versions of the song have been used throughout the franchise, with the lyrics changed or altered to match with each film's plot and the film's subject matter. The original version also appeared in the first and last episode of the Madagascar Netflix series All Hail King Julien and the "Afro Circus/I Like to Move It" tune was played near the start of the Madagascar spin-off film Penguins of Madagascar. The song was also included in the stage adaptation, again sung by King Julien.
