= Madagascar (soundtrack) =

2005 film soundtrack album

Madagascar (Motion Picture Soundtrack)

Soundtrack album by Hans Zimmer
- Released: May 24, 2005
- Studios: AIR Studios, London
- Genres: Rock; pop; disco; new-age; salsa; bossa nova; reggae
- Length: 31:27
- Labels: DreamWorks; Geffen; UMG Soundtracks
- Producer: Hans Zimmer

Hans Zimmer chronology
The Little Polar Bear 2: The Mysterious Island (2005)	Madagascar (2005)	Batman Begins (2005)

Madagascar (Motion Picture Soundtrack) is the soundtrack album to the 2005 animated adventure comedy film Madagascar from DreamWorks Animation, which is the first instalment in the Madagascar franchise. The soundtrack featured popular disco and new-age songs, along with few score cues from the film's original score composed by Hans Zimmer. The film's soundtrack album was released by DreamWorks Records, Geffen Records and UMG Soundtracks on May 24, 2005.

== Background ==
Originally, frequent DreamWorks collaborator Harry Gregson-Williams who had worked with the studio on Antz (1998), Chicken Run (2000), Sinbad: Legend of the Seven Seas (2003) and the first two Shrek films (2001–2004) was hired to compose the film score. But as Gregson-Williams was busy on the production of Kingdom of Heaven (2005), his mentor and another recurring DreamWorks collaborator Hans Zimmer, who worked on the studio's productions: The Prince of Egypt (1998), The Road to El Dorado (2000), Spirit: Stallion of the Cimarron (2002) and Shark Tale (2004), was assigned as the composer. James Dooley, Heitor Pereira, James S. Levine and Ryeland Allison provided additional music. Zimmer also adapted John Barry's instrumental from "Born Free" into the score track of the same name; the Mormon Tabernacle Choir's cover of the song was used in the opening title sequence. Louis Armstrong's song "What a Wonderful World" is used in the film. The cover version of Reel 2 Real's 1993 single "I Like to Move It" by Sacha Baron Cohen, was also used in the film and since become a recurring theme song throughout the Madagascar franchise.

== Release ==
Heather Phares of AllMusic wrote "Madagascar is an unpretentious, gets-the-job-done kind of soundtrack, but that's precisely what makes it so appealing." However, Christian Clemmensen of Filmtracks called the album an "insufferable mess" and added "The film's running time indicates that there must be more score material by Zimmer and his ghostwriters than just the ten minutes here. Not even the odd selection of classic songs can save this one."

== Track listing ==
No.	Title	Artist	Length
1.	"Best Friends"	Hans Zimmer, Heitor Pereira, James S. Levine & Ryeland Allison	2:24
2.	"I Like to Move It"	Sacha Baron Cohen	3:51
3.	"Hawaii Five-O"	The Ventures	1:49
4.	"Boogie Wonderland"	Earth, Wind & Fire with the Emotions	4:49
5.	"Whacked Out Conspiracy"	James Dooley	2:16
6.	"Chariots of Fire"	Vangelis	3:29
7.	"Stayin' Alive"	Bee Gees	4:44
8.	"Zoosters Breakout"	Hans Zimmer	1:39
9.	"Born Free"	John Barry & Don Black	1:24
10.	"The Foosa Attack"	Heitor Pereira	0:37
11.	"Beacon of Liberty"	Hans Zimmer & James S. Levine	2:09
12.	"What a Wonderful World"	Louis Armstrong	2:16
13.	"Callin' Out (Madagascar Version)"	Lyrics Born	3:14
Total length:			31:27

== Personnel ==
Credits adapted from liner notes:

- Music composer and producer – Hans Zimmer
- Additional music – Heitor Pereira, James Dooley, James S. Levine, Ryeland Allison
- Orchestra conductor – Gavin Greenaway, Nick Ingman
- Orchestra leader – Gavyn Wright
- Orchestra contractor – Isobel Griffiths
- Technical engineer – Abhay Manusmare, Mark Wherry, Tom Broderick
- Assistant engineer – Chris Barrett, Ian Wood, Jeffrey Biggers
- Recording – Geoff Foster
- Mixing – Alan Meyerson, Al Clay
- Mastering – Dave Donnelly
- Music editor – Melissa Muik
- Music coordinator – Cindi Smith, Julie Imboden Keel, Ken "Kaz" Smith
- Executive in charge of music – Sunny Park
- Art direction and design – Giant2

Instruments

- Cello – Jonathan Williams, Paul Kegg
- Clarinet – Dave Bishop, Nicholas Bucknall
- Double bass – Allen Walley, Steve Mair
- Flute – Andrew Findon
- French horn – Richard Bissill
- Percussion – Paul Clarvis
- Trumpet – Andy Crowley, Daniel Newell, Mike Lovatt, Pat White, Paul Archibald
- Viola – Bruce White, Helen Goatly, Jake Walker, Rachel Bolt
- Violin – Everton Nelson, Mark Berrow, Tom Pigott-Smith, Warren Zielinski

== Charts ==
Chart (2005)	Peak position
Australian Albums (ARIA)	38
Austrian Albums (Ö3 Austria)	22
Danish Albums (Hitlisten)	79
French Albums (SNEP)	155
US Billboard 200	36
US Soundtrack Albums (Billboard)	3

== Awards and nominations ==
Award	Category	Recipient(s)	Result	Ref.
Annie Awards	Music in an Animated Feature Production	Hans Zimmer	Nominated	
ASCAP Awards	Top Box Office Films	Hans Zimmer	Won	
