= Madagascar: Escape 2 Africa (video game) =

2008 video game

- Developers: Toys for Bob (PS3, Xbox 360, Wii); Aspyr Media (PC); Idol Minds (PS2); Glu Mobile (Mobile); Amaze Entertainment (NDS)
- Publisher: Activision
- Director: Paul Reiche III
- Composer: Michael Wandmacher
- Series: Madagascar
- Platforms: Mobile; Nintendo DS; PlayStation 2; PlayStation 3; Wii; Windows; Xbox 360
- Release: WW: October 30, 2008 (mobile); NA: November 4, 2008; AU: November 26, 2008; EU: November 28, 2008
- Genre: Platform
- Modes: Single-player, multiplayer

Madagascar: Escape 2 Africa is a platform game based on the film of the same name. It was released on the Windows, Nintendo DS, PlayStation 2, PlayStation 3, Wii, Xbox 360 and Java-based mobile phones. The gameplay is similar to the movie's first scenes with the same characters and moves, although the environment is in Africa. The Nintendo Channel released a playable demo of this game on the week of November 7, that shows one of the side-scrolling, Lemmings-like levels in which the penguins of the series are the main characters.

== Plot ==
Eight years after the events of the first game, Alex, Marty, Melman and Gloria (alongside the Penguins, King Julien, Maurice, Mort and the Chimps, Mason and Phil) decide to return to the Central Park Zoo, and travel there using an abandoned plane which was repaired by the penguins. Mort stows away, and ends up making the plane crash before it can arrive. They realize that they are in Africa, their old home. Alex reunites with his father Zuba, the alpha male of his pride, but Zuba's evil friend, Makunga, reminds him that every new lion must pass a rite of passage before being accepted into the pride. Alex nearly succeeds, but fails the last task (yelling his catchphrase), and is not allowed into the pride. Marty joins a herd of zebras identical to him, while Melman and King Julien become the doctors of the giraffes, and Gloria and Maurice kick a group of evil crocodiles out of the watering hole. Gloria then starts dating a male hippo named Moto-Moto.

Meanwhile, the Penguins scrounge up equipment to fix the plane by stealing it from a nearby human safari camp. Mort eventually manages to reach the watering hole and catch up to the Zoosters after going through a dangerous swamp.

Melman soon becomes jealous of Moto-Moto, admitting that he has feelings for Gloria to Julien, who helps him take pictures of Moto-Moto hanging out with other hippos. Gloria rejects Melman, who decides to leap into a volcano, but is stopped by her. Melman then wins a dance contest against Moto-Moto, after which he and Gloria confess their love. The two catch up to Alex and Marty, and the four are then informed by King Julien and Maurice that the watering hole has dried up, and there is no more drinking water. The animals investigate, and they realize a bunch of New Yorkers have built a dam to block the watering hole.

The Penguins and the Chimps, who have finished repairing the plane, take the animals to the humans' camp, where they destroy the dam and the camp. They decide to stay in Africa for a while.

== Reception ==
Reception

Aggregate score
Aggregator	Score
Metacritic	(DS) 55/100 (PC) 58/100 (PS2) 56/100 (PS3) 58/100 (Wii) 62/100 (X360) 62/100

Review scores
Publication	Score
GameSpot	(PS3/X360/WII) 7.5/10
GamesRadar+	(WII) 2.5/5
GameZone	(PS2) 6.5/10 (WII) 7/10
IGN	(PS3/X360/WII) 4.3/10 (DS) 5.5/10
Nintendo World Report	(WII) 6/10 (DS) 5.5/10
Pocket Gamer	(Mobile) 2.5/5
The Guardian	(PS3/X360/WII) 2/5

Madagascar: Escape 2 Africa received "mixed or average" reviews, according to review aggregator website Metacritic.
