= H. Lee Peterson =

American film editor

H. Lee Peterson (February 4, 1953 - August 7, 2026) was an American film editor.

His credits for Walt Disney Feature Animation include assistant editor for The Little Mermaid, and lead film editor for Aladdin, Pocahontas, Dinosaur, Home on the Range, and the short film The Prince and the Pauper. He has also worked for DreamWorks Animation, where his credits include the first three Madagascar films, and Pixar as an additional film editor on Monsters University. For Sony Pictures Animation, H. Lee worked on Cloudy with a Chance of Meatballs 2 and Smurfs: The Lost Village.

Peterson was assistant editor on Moonwalker as well as the documentary Hail! Hail! Rock 'n' Roll.

In 1996 he was elected as a member of the American Cinema Editors.

He was married to Alex Rylance, with whom he has two children.
