= Madagascar (video game) =

2005 video game

- North American GameCube box art
- Developers: Toys for Bob (PS2, Xbox, GC); Beenox (PC); Vicarious Visions (GBA, NDS)
- Publisher: Activision
- Directors: Paul Reiche III; Fred Ford
- Producers: Iana Iasiello; Alex Ness
- Designers: Toby Schadt; Mike Ebert
- Programmers: Peter Lipson; Robert Leyland; Jamie Davis
- Artists: Terrence C. Falls; Alec Franklin
- Writers: Billy Frolick; Alex Ness; Kelly Wand; Kelly Byrd
- Composer: Michael Wandmacher
- Series: Madagascar
- Engine: RenderWare
- Platforms: Game Boy Advance, GameCube, Microsoft Windows, Nintendo DS, PlayStation 2, Xbox
- Release: NA: May 24, 2005; EU: June 30, 2005
- Genres: Action-adventure, platform
- Modes: Single-player, multiplayer

Madagascar is a 2005 platform game based on the animated film of the same name by Eric Darnell and Tom McGrath, produced by DreamWorks Animation. The game was released on May 24, 2005 in North America and on June 30, 2005 in Europe. The GameCube, PlayStation 2 and Xbox versions were developed by Toys for Bob. The Microsoft Windows version was developed by Beenox and the Nintendo DS and Game Boy Advance versions were developed by Vicarious Visions. All versions of the game were published by Activision. Madagascar: Operation Penguin was the next Madagascar video game to be released on the Game Boy Advance.

Despite being commercially successful, Madagascar received mixed reviews from critics, who praised its humor and gameplay variety, but criticised its graphics and short length. A sequel, Madagascar: Escape 2 Africa, was released on November 4, 2008.

== Gameplay ==
Madagascar is mainly a platformer with stealth, puzzle, and combat elements. The player mainly controls Marty the zebra, while in other levels the player can also control Gloria the hippo, Melman the giraffe, and Alex the lion. Each character in the game has his or her own ability. To gain said abilities, the player must first find three cards, known as power cards, to gain them. Skipper the penguin and Mort the mouse lemur are also playable in some levels. Outside of platforming, there are also challenges including using a crane to eliminate the crew of a ship, shooting darts at a hunter, protecting mushrooms from cockroaches, escorting lemurs to safety, flinging explosive durians at worms, as well as defeating crocodile martial artists.

Throughout the levels, players can collect Monkey Coins, which can be cashed in at the Zoovenir Shop, an in-game store, for character accessories, mini-games, extra health, and cheats. The player can also collect healing tikis, which when ten of them are collected, grants the player an extra life. The player can also earn bonus coins by performing additional tasks, including jumping through a number of rings as Alex and destroying a number of vehicles in New York City as Gloria.

== Plot ==
Marty the zebra, Alex the lion, Gloria the Hippopotamus and Melman the Giraffe live in the Central Park Zoo in New York. On Marty's tenth birthday, Marty starts to have doubts that the zoo is where he belongs, and finds that life in the zoo is boring. That night, a penguin living in the zoo named Skipper decides to break out of the zoo, and invites Marty to come with him, and gives Marty directions on how to clear paths. Skipper, in order to escape himself, is forced to abandon Marty in the process, but gives him more directions. Marty manages to make it to the main exit and leave. Realizing this, Alex, Melman and Gloria decide to go and look for him. As they find him, they are surrounded by police, tranquilized, and sent to a wild life reserve. Skipper and his team of penguins: Private, Rico and Kowalski are also on board. They escape from their crate and head for the bridge where they knock the captain unconscious and turn the ship around to Antarctica. Marty, Alex, Melman and Gloria fall into the ocean in the process. Alex is washed onto a beach unconscious, and soon wakes up. Finding an opened crate belonging to Marty on the beach, he concludes that his friends are there too, and goes off to find them. In the jungle, he helps different animals with their tasks, and in return they give him his friends' whereabouts and finally reunites with his friends.

They go search for help, and find an entire tribe of lemurs having a party. The lemurs introduce themselves, and explain that the island they are on is called Madagascar, but as they talk, they are attacked by the fossas, the enemies of the lemurs. The animals protect the lemurs, and help them collect food for another party. After the party, Gloria finds that Alex is acting strange because he didn't eat any food during the party, and tells Melman to go find steak while she goes to find Marty, Melman fails in finding steak, and meets up with Maurice, Gloria and Marty. Marty announces that Alex bit him on the butt. Maurice explains that lions are supposed to eat other animals, and that Alex never harmed animals before because in the zoo food was given to him, and the four flee to the beach. A warthog named Wilbur, who falls in love with Gloria and agrees to give them information if she gives him a kiss after the work, tells them that the rescue beacon on the beach is broken, but there are many things lying around the beach that they can use to rebuild the beacon. They collect enough materials and finally, they build a beacon resembling the Statue of Liberty.

Marty decides that he must go back for Alex. Meanwhile, Alex is hiding in the lair of the foosa, feeling ashamed of himself. He encounters the king of the fossa and defeats him, after which Marty arrives and rescues Alex and they give the leader to the penguins and reunite with Melman and Gloria at the beach. There, the lemurs thank the gang for their help.

== Reception ==
Reception

Aggregate score
Aggregator	Score
Metacritic	(DS) 66/100 (GBA) 71/100 (GC) 70/100 (PC) 73/100 (PS2) 69/100 (Xbox) 71/100

Review scores
Publication	Score
GameSpot	7/10
IGN	7/10

Madagascar received "mixed or average" reviews, according to review aggregator website Metacritic. While it was praised for its simple and fun gameplay, humor, and variety, it was criticised for its low-quality graphics, short length, and lacking replay value. Alex Navarro of GameSpot gave it a score of 7 out of 10, calling it "a short but endearing adventure that will be immediately appealing to the adolescent gamers in your household, whether or not they've seen the movie. And if they have, all the better.". Likewise, IGN also gave the game a 7 out of 10, stating "those looking for a good, kid-focused platformer will find it in Madagascar. It doesn't force you through level after level of mindless item collection. Instead, it boasts a number of well-designed levels that feature a variety of play styles.". Game Informer gave the game 7/10, saying "the gameplay is simple yet heavily varied, which in turn keeps the action fresh and fun.". Official U.S. PlayStation Magazine stated "overall, the mechanics are OK, though the camera is kind of unwieldy. But very frankly, that probably won't matter all that much to the target audience."

Despite the mixed reception, the Academy of Interactive Arts & Sciences nominated Madagascar for "Children's Game of the Year" during the 9th Annual Interactive Achievement Awards.

The game shipped more than 1 million copies. Madagascar ultimately sold 1.36 million copies.
