= Madagascar: Operation Penguin =

2005 video game

- Developer: Vicarious Visions
- Publisher: Activision
- Producer: Adrian Earle
- Designer: Jeremy Russo
- Programmers: Bob Koon; Robert Trevellyan
- Series: Madagascar
- Platform: Game Boy Advance
- Release: EU: October 28, 2005; NA: November 7, 2005
- Genre: Platform
- Mode: Single-player

Madagascar: Operation Penguin is a 2005 licensed platform game developed by Vicarious Visions and published by Activision for the Game Boy Advance. It is based on the DreamWorks Animation movie Madagascar and loosely follows events from the film's subplot, involving four penguins who attempt to escape the Central Park Zoo in order to live in Antarctica. Using various gadgets, the player traverses through 18 side-scrolling levels. The game's critical reception was mostly positive, with praise for its visuals and some criticism directed towards its gameplay and audio.

== Gameplay ==
Madagascar: Operation Penguin is a side-scrolling platform game based on the DreamWorks Animation film Madagascar, loosely following events from its subplot involving four penguins journey to escape the Central Park Zoo and live in Antarctica. The player primarily controls one of these penguins, Private, through 18 levels, while using various gadgets in order to traverse certain obstacles and enemies.

== Reception ==
Reception

Review scores
Publication	Score
GameZone	7.5/10
IGN	8.8/10
Games Chronicle	7/10

GameZone gave the game a 7.5/10, stating: "With more variety and some mini-games, this could have been a better game, but as it stands, it's still a good outing with those penguins from Madagascar". Console Gameworld said it offers "witty dialogue to keep the story moving along and has some replay value." Game Chronicles claimed that Operation Penguin is "technically a very solid game, and only falls apart once you realize that [...] it's all the same old same old." Operation Penguin received "Favorite Video Game" at the 2006 Nickelodeon Kids' Choice Awards.
