= List of All Hail King Julien episodes =

All Hail King Julien is an animated television series featuring characters from the DreamWorks Animation animated film Madagascar. The show stars King Julien (Danny Jacobs), the lemur from the Madagascar franchise, and tells the story of his life in Madagascar before the events of the first film.

During the course of the series, 78 episodes of All Hail King Julien were released over five seasons, with the separate season being subtitled Exiled.

== Series overview ==
| Season | Episodes | | Originally released |
|---|---|---|---|
| 1 | 10 | 5 | December 19, 2014 |
| 1 | 10 | 5 | April 3, 2015 |
| 2 | 16 | | October 16, 2015 |
| 3 | 13 | | June 17, 2016 |
| 4 | 13 | | November 11, 2016 |
| Exiled | 13 | | May 12, 2017 |
| 5 | 13 | | December 1, 2017 |

== Episodes ==
=== Season 1 (2014–15) ===
The series premiered on December 19, 2014, when were released the first five 22-minute episodes. They were followed by a second batch of five episodes on April 3, 2015.

| No. overall | No. in season | Title | Directed by | Written by | Original release date |
|---|---|---|---|---|---|
Part 1
| 1 | 1 | "King Me" | Christo Stamboliev | Brandon Sawyer & Mitch Watson | December 19, 2014 |
When Uncle King Julien XII abdicates his throne upon learning of his fate from Masikura, he hands off his crown to Prince Julien. When the Foosa attack, King Julien must rescue them and avoid being eaten by the Foosa.
| 2 | 2 | "Poll Position" | Christo Stamboliev | Elliott Owen | December 19, 2014 |
King Julien learns from Xixi that 99% of the lemurs love him, so he makes it his mission to find and convert the one "hater" lemur.
| 3 | 3 | "Enter the Fanaloka" | Matt Engstrom & James Wootton | Mitch Watson | December 19, 2014 |
During King Julien's holiday "Franksgiving" (a holiday dedicated to Frank the Sky God), the evil fanaloka genius Karl sets out to destroy King Julien. When both Clover and Maurice are captured by Karl and his Madagascar hissing cockroach minion Chauncey, King Julien must save them from his new nemesis.
| 4 | 4 | "Empty is the Head" | Matt Engstrom & James Wootton | Mark Palmer & Mitch Watson | December 26, 2014 |
Exhausted from settling his subjects' disputes, King Julien replaces himself with a dummy king so he can play hooky by posing as "Banana Guy Mike," which unwittingly starts a rebellion.
| 5 | 5 | "Return of the Uncle King" | Christo Stamboliev | Matt Shire & Mitch Watson | December 26, 2014 |
Set on reclaiming his throne, Uncle King Julien convinces Julien into Foosa territory. Julien creates a disguise and forces Maurice to join him.
Part 2
| 6 | 6 | "Eat, Prey, Shove" | Christo Stamboliev | Elliott Owen | April 3, 2015 |
Clover is forced to take a vacation with Mort and Xixi. While on vacation, she meets the handsome and free-spirited Sage Moondancer. Meanwhile, Ted covers for Clover as King Julien's bodyguard and unknowingly causes the Foosa to take advantage of Clover's vacation to attack King Julien's kingdom.
| 7 | 7 | "He Blinded Me with Science" | Bret Haaland & James Wootton | Dan Milano & Mitch Watson | April 3, 2015 |
Julien's boombox runs out of power when it comes to the ceremonial dance that will have the precipitation god Kevin to bring rain. Julien teams up with Timo, a tenrec scientist enlisted by the king to automate everything in the kingdom after he managed to get Julien's boombox working after it ran out of battery power. The lemurs start to get hooked on science much to the dismay of Masikura.
| 8 | 8 | "Viva Mort" | Ken Morrissey, Matt Engstrom & James Wootton | Elliott Owen | April 3, 2015 |
After embarrassing Maurice who was doing a dance to the music on Julien's boombox, Julien tries to make up for his transgression. Meanwhile, Mort inadvertently joins Becca and Abner's anti-King Julien group called the Lemur Alliance Liberation Army (or "LALA" for short) that seeks to avenge the "death" of Banana Guy Mike, whom they still don't know it was King Julien.
| 9 | 9 | "The Really Really Big Lie" | Christo Stamboliev | Sharon Flynn | April 10, 2015 |
Julien concocts an elaborate lie by blaming a giant "mega-gecko" for ruining the birthday party of a young lemur named Todd after Julien's attempt to get rid of a fly causes the party to be ruined. When Clover turns the lemur colony into a hunter-gatherer community to hunt the mega-gecko, Julien enlists Timo to build a mega-gecko for Clover to target only for the mega-gecko to go out of control.
| 10 | 10 | "One More Cup" | Stephen Heneveld | Mitch Watson | April 10, 2015 |
Julien finds a bag of coffee beans in the Cove of Wonders and fishes it out with Mort's help. Thinking that they are a gift from the sea gods, Julien gets the entire lemur community hooked on caffeine. What Julien doesn't know is that this is all a plan by Karl to bring the lemur kingdom to its knees.

=== Season 2 (2015) ===
| No. overall | No. in season | Title | Directed by | Written by | Original release date |
|---|---|---|---|---|---|
| 11 | 1 | "My Fair Foosa" | James Wootton | Michael Ryan | October 16, 2015 |
King Julien has a brilliant idea in order to handle the Foosa situations: He'll tame a Foosa named Mary Ann and train it to keep peace in his kingdom with the attempts by Timo, Masikura, and Ted until King Julien finds it to be soothed by music. But the plan doesn't go quite as expected when Mary Ann ends up making suggestions that would unimprove King Julien's kingdom.
| 12 | 2 | "Diapers Are the New Black" | Stephen Heneveld | Sharon Flynn | October 16, 2015 |
King Julien sparks a fashion frenzy when he turns a box of diapers into the coolest styles the kingdom has ever seen upon being told about them by Xixi. He soon ends up in a fashion war with Dorothy and Ted over the diaper distributions.
| 13 | 3 | "Crimson and Clover" | Christo Stamboliev | Elliott Owen | October 16, 2015 |
It's love at first sight when Julien meets Clover's party-girl sister, Crimson, who has a reputation of leaving destruction wherever she goes. When Julien and Crimson make wedding plans, Clover works to keep the marriage from happening.
| 14 | 4 | "Pineapple of My Eye" | James Wootton | Alejandro Bien-Willner, Mitch Watson & Steve Altiere | October 16, 2015 |
When Julien is fooled by Masikura into believing that a "divine pineapple" that he named Piney contains the wisdom of former Kings so that she can go on vacation, a jealous Mort tries to get rid of it only for its disappearance to start making Julien depressed.
| 15 | 5 | "Gimme Gimme Gimme: The Game" | Stephen Heneveld | Michael Ryan | October 16, 2015 |
Fascinated by the idea of money upon Mort showing him the board game "Gimme Gimme Gimme," King Julien brings money to the kingdom. But Mort's surprising money skills create big problems when he brings the game into real life for everyone in the kingdom.
| 16 | 6 | "Body Double" | Stephen Heneveld | Sharon Flynn | October 16, 2015 |
In his upcoming meeting with the cranky Nile crocodiles, King Julien plans to use a political body double to attend the meeting. As Clover recommends Magic Steve, King Julien goes with Sage Moondancer. When Sage Moondancer is injured sliding down the water slide, King Julien enlists Magic Steve as his body double to attend the meeting with the cranky Nile crocodiles in his place. Magic Steve has other plans as he plans to run King Julien's kingdom.
| 17 | 7 | "Election" | James Wootton | Shane Atkinson, Sharon Flynn, Elliott Owen & Michael Ryan | October 23, 2015 |
During Xixi's "Gorch Watch" where fruit must be thrown into its cave to appease it, Julien, Maurice, and Clover enter the cave and rescue Doc Sugarfoot, a charming old lemur who was trapped inside after his tail was pinned down while hiding from the Foosa years earlier. Julien then takes him on as part of his royal counsel. Soon, Doc Sugarfoot challenges Julien to a popularity-based election where the most popular lemur gets to be king. This proves to be bad when Doc Sugarfoot is revealed to be King Julien the Terrible, a lemur who ruled with an iron fist before a rebellion stopped his reign of terror.
| 18 | 8 | "Daddy Julien" | James Wootton | Mitch Watson, Michael Ryan, Elliott Owen, Sharon Flynn & Kara Lee Burk | October 23, 2015 |
Julien thinks Mort is his son and renames him Prince Falcon where he enters him in the 6th Annual Junior Gents Talent and Beauty Pageant hosted by Ted. Little does he know Mort's true age. Taking advantage of Mort's scheme, Becca and Abner come up with their latest plot to destroy King Julien at the Junior Gents Talent and Beauty Pageant. At the same time, Clover works to learn how to be motherly from Dorothy and Ted.
| 19 | 9 | "That's Sooo Rob" | Christo Stamboliev | Mitch Watson, Michael Ryan & Benjamin Townsend | October 23, 2015 |
King Julien's former best friend and partner in a rap duo named Rob McTodd shows up to lure the king back to his wild partying ways after King Julien lifts the banishment sentence that Uncle King Julien imposed on Rob. As Rob plans to show King Julien their dream club called Club Moist at the time when most of the lemurs get exhausted from overpartying, Xixi informs Maurice and Clover that Rob is planning on getting even with King Julien following his banishment and after escaping police custody. Now Clover, Maurice, and Mort must rescue King Julien before Rob has an underworld doctor named Dr. S exchange their faces.
| 20 | 10 | "The Man in the Iron Booty" | Christo Stamboliev | Mitch Watson, Michael Ryan, Sharon Flynn & Nate Knetchel | October 23, 2015 |
King Julien gives up his kingdom to help a fellow royal in distress by sending 1,000 mangoes to help reclaim his kingdom. Then he ends up giving away 1,000 of every required objects that he is asked to send. When he sails across the ocean to the little atoll in the southwest of Madagascar, King Julien, Maurice, and Mort find out that they have been tricked by Uncle King Julien and Crimson who have established their prison kingdom Feartopia and eventually placed King Julien in an Iron Booty. Meanwhile, Clover is sent on a treasure hunt that leads to different gifts from her secret admirer and encounters Sage Moondancer who has been tricked by Crimson into doing away with Clover. Now Clover must rescue everyone, free King Julien, and defeat Uncle King Julien and Crimson.
| 21 | 11 | "Monkey Planet" | James Wootton | Elliott Owen | October 23, 2015 |
After setting out to claim the Moon for all lemur kind upon using a space pod found in Timo's area, King Julien and Maurice land in the desert part of Madagascar thinking they are on Mars. They come face-to-face with a Russian-speaking space chimpanzee named Stanislav as Timo plans to use Stanislav to perfect King Julien's next attempt to get to the Moon. Meanwhile, Clover is suspicious that the crocodiles might get to the Moon to plant their space laser there.
| 22 | 12 | "True Bromance" | Stephen Heneveld | Mitch Watson, Michael Ryan & Jenny Keene | October 30, 2015 |
When King Julien learns from Clover her discover of Maurice moonlighting as an advisor to King Joey of the Jumping Rats, Maurice explains that he has been helping them out ever since they were living in chaos upon Karl's coffee fields exploding and needed their own kingdom. King Julien and Maurice break up. While King Julien tries to find a replacement advisor, Maurice deals with the Jumping Rats who take things too literally while wanting to build a maze. King Julien ask the divine pineapple for advice who states that he should get back together with Maurice.
| 23 | 13 | "The King Who Would Be King" | Stephen Heneveld | Michael Ryan | October 30, 2015 |
Maurice shows King Julien a large book called "The Kings' Chronicles" that tells the stories of the King Juliens that came before King Julien from King Julien I and King Julien II, through Uncle King Julien and himself while showing that King Julien's story needs to be added. As King Julien has a hard time thinking about what he should write about, Clover does some ghostwriting for him. While writing King Julien's life story, Clover makes up some tall tales including one about a baby-eating giant scorpion named Fred. The real Fred reads it and vows revenge.
| 24 | 14 | "Are You There, Frank? It's Me, King Julien" | Christo Stamboliev | Sharon Flynn | October 16, 2015 |
After some doubting that Frank the Sky God isn't real, King Julien is visited by Frank the Sky God. The next day, Frank demands that the lemurs sacrifice King Julien to his brother Larry the Volcano God. When King Julien, Maurice, and Clover go to confront Frank the Sky God, they discover that Frank is actually a Robot operated by Karl and Chauncey in their latest plot to get rid of King Julien. Now King Julien must enlist Timo to create a robot Larry in order to fight Karl on even grounds.
| 25 | 15 | "The Phantom of Club Moist" | James Wootton | Mitch Watson | October 23, 2015 |
Maurice narrates at the piano about the time when King Julien planned to leave behind a legacy. He does this by living out his dream of opening a nightclub called Club Moist finally comes true. Club Moist is then haunted by a masked phantom who sabotages the performances in order to get King Julien to close down Club Moist. It is soon discovered that the Phantom of Club Moist is actually Rob McTodd as he plans to have Dr. S switch King Julien's brain with Rob's brain.
| 26 | 16 | "King Juli-END?" | Christo Stamboliev | Elliott Owen | October 16, 2015 |
King Julien is diagnosed with Mad Horse Disease during his appointment with Dr. S. As there is no cure to Mad Horse Disease and he has only one week to live, King Julien is advised by Masikura to make amends with everyone he has ever wronged. Upon becoming the latest person King Julien has made amends to, Crimson frees Uncle King Julien from Feartopia and learns of his nephew's illness. They also come up with a plan to make the disease deadly if King Julien's illness is less serious so that Uncle King Julien can reclaim his kingdom. As Uncle King Julien cuts a deal with Mary Ann and the Foosa to give half the lemurs to them, King Julien won't give up his kingdom without a fight.

=== Season 3 (2016) ===
| No. overall | No. in season | Title | Directed by | Written by | Original release date |
|---|---|---|---|---|---|
| 27 | 1 | "O Captain My Captain" | Stephen Heneveld | Sharon Flynn | June 17, 2016 |
| 28 | 2 | "O Captain My Captain" | James Wootton | Michael Ryan | June 17, 2016 |
Part 1: Following the fight against Uncle King Julien and the Foosa and the Mega Gecko exploding, King Julien is imprisoned by pirates led by Captain Ethan and plans an escape with Sage Moondancer. Clover and Mort set sail to find him. Meanwhile, Maurice has to deal with harvest festival in King Julien's absence, and King Julien's parents make a surprise return. Part 2: Clover and Mort race to rescue King Julien as tries to avoid the pirates' plank by showing off his prime "pirate recruit" booty moves. Meanwhile, Julien's parents plan to sacrifice one of the lemurs to appease the gods.
| 29 | 3 | "Dance, Dance, Resolution" | Christo Stamboliev | Elliott Owen | June 17, 2016 |
As his parents prepare to leave, Julien tries to reclaim his childhood by forcing them to attend the dance recital they missed when he was a kid.
| 30 | 4 | "Oh Brother Where Aren't Thou?" | Stephen Heneveld | Mitch Watson | June 17, 2016 |
Julien begs his parents to give him a brother, so they buy an Aye-Aye. But when Julien makes them official brothers, he loses his title as king.
| 31 | 5 | "Love Gauntlet" | James Wootton | Mitch Watson, Michael Ryan, Sharon Flynn, Elliott Owen & Grant Calof | June 17, 2016 |
Julien panics when his parents announce they are never leaving. His plan to scare them off backfires when Karl takes the idea too far.
| 32 | 6 | "Jungle Games" | James Wootton | Sharon Flynn | June 24, 2016 |
Julien bets that his team can beat Uncle King Julien's, and he puts the whole kingdom on the line. The only problem? Julien's star athlete is dead.
| 33 | 7 | "Close Encounters of the Mort Kind" | Stephen Heneveld | Elliott Owen | June 24, 2016 |
Julien becomes jealous when Mort is repeatedly abducted by aliens. Julien plans to make the aliens abduct him instead.
| 34 | 8 | "The Butterfly War" | Christo Stamboliev | Sharon Flynn | June 24, 2016 |
Feeling the kingdom lacks unity, Julien starts a war with the butterflies. Things go wrong when the butterflies turn out to be more than the kingdom can handle.
| 35 | 9 | "Fast Food Lemur Nation" | Christo Stamboliev | Benjamin Lapides | June 24, 2016 |
Eager to create fast food for the kingdom, Julien holds an idea contest. But will the winning entry be a dining delight or a cooking curse?
| 36 | 10 | "Get Off My Lawn" | James "Wootie" Wootton | Elliott Owen | June 17, 2016 |
Julien is sure that his beloved jumping bean was stolen and becomes obsessed with security. To Clover's dismay, he arms the village with scorpions.
| 37 | 11 | "Revenge of the Prom" | Christo Stamboliev | Sharon Flynn | June 24, 2016 |
Julien sees the Lemur School reunion as a way to relive his glory days, but his old flame Karen and his foe Karl have a dangerously different agenda.
| 38 | 12 | "Eye of the Clover" | Stephen Heneveld | Michael Ryan | June 24, 2016 |
Clover must choose between royal duty and family pride after she's invited to compete in the Tournament of the Doomed and Julien forbids her to go. But is this Tournament more than it seems?
| 39 | 13 | "Run for the Border" | Stephen Heneveld | Mitch Watson | June 17, 2016 |
When his peace treaty leads to unrest and a broken boom box, Julien wants to build a wall to keep non-lemurs out of the party kingdom.

=== Season 4 (2016) ===
| No. overall | No. in season | Title | Directed by | Written by | Original release date |
|---|---|---|---|---|---|
| 40 | 1 | "The All Hail King Julien Show" | Emmanuel Deligiannis | Mitch Watson | November 11, 2016 |
King Julien launches a new TV channel called "Julien-Vision" but quickly realizes that the kingdom only wants to watch a reality show of his own life.
| 41 | 2 | "The Neverending Clover" | Stephen Heneveld | Sharon Flynn | November 11, 2016 |
After Clover is knocked unconscious, the entire kingdom plays along when she wakes up believing she's living in a make-believe storybook world.
| 42 | 3 | "Who Arted?" | James "Wootie" Wootton | Elliott Owen | November 11, 2016 |
King Julien is crazy with jealousy and throws out the kingdom's art after he is upstaged by Mort who is now the town's hottest new artist.
| 43 | 4 | "That Sinking Feeling" | Emmanuel Deligiannis | Mitch Watson, Michael DeGrandis, Elliott Owen, Micheal Ryan and Benjamin Lapides | November 11, 2016 |
When Masikura convinces King Julien that the island is sinking, Julien believes building an ark is the only way to save his people.
| 44 | 5 | "The Jungle Rooster" | Stephen Heneveld | Sharon Flynn | November 18, 2016 |
When the Jungle Rooster keeps him up at night, Julien discovers that the Foosa have been farming chickens for food and risks his life to free them all.
| 45 | 6 | "The Good Book" | James "Wootie" Wootton | Elliott Owen | November 18, 2016 |
When Julien finds an old book of manners, he wants to host a debutante ball, and invites the Crocodile Ambassador to teach the kingdom manners, but soon finds out that the whole idea is leaving everybody too uptight to party!
| 46 | 7 | "The King and Mrs. Mort" | James "Wootie" Wootton | Ben Lapides | November 18, 2016 |
With Julien sick and the others away on a cruise, Mort poses as king to entertain a judge from a big competition -- with disastrous results.
| 47 | 8 | "King Julien Superstar!" | Emmanuel Deligiannis | Benjamin Lapides | November 18, 2016 |
Julien, Clover, Mort and Maurice become music sensations overnight, thanks to Timo's new invention, but the band breaks up over Julien and Clover's non-stop fighting.
| 48 | 9 | "The Panchurian Candidate" | Stephen Heneveld | Sharon Flynn | November 11, 2016 |
After Uncle King Julien turned Pancho into a deadly killer so he could take back his throne, King Julien must save the kingdom before it's too late.
| 49 | 10 | "The Wrath of Morticus Khan" | James "Wootie" Wootton | Michael Ryan | November 25, 2016 |
King Julien clones himself but things take a turn for the worse when Mort wants his "very own King Julien", and accidentally unleashes Morticus Khan, an evil warlord, and his army of Mort clones.
| 50 | 11 | "Koto, Plain and Tall" | Emmanuel Deligiannis | Elliott Owen | November 25, 2016 |
Julien is lost in the jungle and accidentally saves a Mountain Lemur named Koto who turns out to be the biggest threat the kingdom has ever faced.
| 51 | 12 | "I, Maurice" | Steven Evangelatos | Mitch Watson | November 11, 2016 |
When Maurice learns that he isn't a lemur like everyone else, he sets off on a journey to find his Aye-Aye parents and sister Brosalind.
| 52 | 13 | "Un-King Me" | James "Wootie" Wootton | Sharon Flynn | November 11, 2016 |
When the kingdom is overrun with refugees, Julien is shocked that an old friend Koto and his Mountain Lemur army are preparing to attack.

=== Season Exiled (2017) ===
| No. overall | No. in season | Title | Directed by | Written by | Original release date |
|---|---|---|---|---|---|
| 53 | 1 | "The Strife Aquatic" | Steve Evangelatos | Elliott Owen | May 12, 2017 |
After fleeing the kingdom, King Julien and Maurice discover an unwanted visitor; Sage takes Clover to meet his master; Koto makes everyone his slave.
| 54 | 2 | "The Most Eggcellent Adventure" | Emmanuel Deligiannis | Sharon Flynn | May 12, 2017 |
King Julien and Maurice arrive on an island full of lady lemurs; Sage and Clover pick out Clover's "emotional support hawk"; Mort gains intel on Koto.
| 55 | 3 | "Iron Ted Weekend" | James "Wootie" Wootton | Michael Ryan | May 12, 2017 |
King Julien and team discover a trapped Crimson and must team up to defeat a beast; Mort tries to rally his fellow lemurs but they are losing hope.
| 56 | 4 | "Bridge on the River Mort" | Steve Evangelatos | Benjamin Lapides | May 12, 2017 |
King Julien decides to get his kingdom back; Sage and Clover train with Sage's Master; Mort rallies everyone to build an escape tunnel.
| 57 | 5 | "Raiders of the Lord Shark" | Emmanuel Deligiannis | Mitch Watson | May 12, 2017 |
King Julien's submarine sinks in the ocean; Clover & Sage go on quests to test their patience and rage; Mort leads an escape but a spy is in the midst.
| 58 | 6 | "Bad-Year Blimp" | James "Wootie" Wootton | Elliott Owen | May 19, 2017 |
King Julien and his team ride sharks to an island, who turns out to be inhabited by Stanislav and his fellow Russian space chimpanzees. Clover and Sage get a map that leads to the wisdom they seek. Mort hides in Junk Harbor.
| 59 | 7 | "Cult Fiction" | Steven Evangelatos | Sharon Flynn | May 19, 2017 |
King Julien resumes his trek to reclaim his kingdom. Clover and Sage find a self-help seminar led by an old friend. Mort finally contacts King Julien.
| 60 | 8 | "Fauxsa Unchained" | Emmanuel Deligiannis | Michael Ryan | May 19, 2017 |
King Julien and Maurice infiltrate a Foosa gladiator school ruled by Mary Ann. Jarsh-Jarsh switches Sage and Clover's bodies to make them face their fears. Mort looks for Hans who advises him he must form his own army.
| 61 | 9 | "I Am Fartacus" | James "Wootie" Wootton | Benjamin Lapides | May 12, 2017 |
King Julien and Maurice pose as Foosa at a gladiator school managed by Uncle King Julien, and try to "fight" their way to Koto's wedding. Sage returns home to find a memory box to help his brother, but he & Clover are captured by Koto and his men. With the help of Smart Mort, Timo fixes his dimensional machine and they head to the Mortverse.
| 62 | 10 | "For Whom the Bell Gods Toll" | Steven Evangelatos | Mitch Watson | May 19, 2017 |
While looking for Maurice, King Julien accidentally blows himself up and wakes up in Frankri-La, where must stand trial to prove he's been a good king to be awarded a second chance to live. Maurice wakes up in a cave whose strange inhabitants believe he's the chosen one. Mort battles Morticus Khan for control of the Mort army, learning of his true nature in the process. Julien arch-enemy Karl arrives at the gladiator school, offering to help Julien recover his throne.
| 63 | 11 | "Out of the Foosa Pen and into the Fire" | Emmanuel Deligiannis | Elliot Owen | May 12, 2017 |
King Julien, Karl, Ted, Uncle King Julien, Mary Ann and her Foosa arrive at the Koto's wedding festivities, planning to trap him, but their plan fails when Koto takes Clover with him. With Mom-Bot's help, Mort dives into his subconscious to wake Smart Mort and help Timo fix the dimensional machine so he can get his army back to help King Julien. Clover agrees to marry Koto to save her friends. King Julien and his allies are captured by Koto.
| 64 | 12 | "The Day After Yesterday" | James "Wootie" Wootton | Micheal Ryan | May 19, 2017 |
Koto announces that he's going to execute Julien, Karl, Ted, Mary Ann, Uncle King Julien and Sage as a wedding present. Clover manages to project her soul out the cell and gets Sage to react. They save Julien and his allies, but they are outnumbered. Then all of Julien's allies come to help him and his fellow lemurs: Mort, Timo and Mom-bot arrive with Mort's army, as does Stanislav with his fellow chimpanzees; Maurice returns with the snail-bell people and the aye-aye are also there. Sage frees Clover. Koto's wedding turns into all-out battle and, to end it, Koto throws his spear towards Julien.
| 65 | 13 | "The Day Before Tomorrow" | Steven Evangelatos | Benjamin Lapides & Elliott Owen | May 19, 2017 |
As things turn dire, King Julien orders his troops to retreat but later manages to come up with a plan for all of them to work together to destroy the mountain lemurs once and for all. The mountain lemurs are forced to retreat, but Koto kidnaps Julien. Sage battles his brother and defeats him, but Clover convinces him to not kill him. Julien accidentally makes Koto's stone statue fall over him, killing him for real. King Julien recovers his crown. Sage is now king of the mountain lemurs.

=== Season 5 (2017) ===
| No. overall | No. in season | Title | Directed by | Written by | Original release date |
|---|---|---|---|---|---|
| 66 | 1 | "Julien 2.0" | Emmanuel Deligiannis | Mitch Watson | December 1, 2017 |
King Julien announces he's turning over a new leaf and seeks anonymous suggestions from his subjects on how to improve their kingdom.
| 67 | 2 | "Spin Cycle" | James "Wootie" Wootton | Elliott Owen | December 1, 2017 |
Tired of being passed over for manly assignments, Ted brings back his macho alter ego, Snake. Julien uses Xixi's talk show to boost his image.
| 68 | 3 | "Night Creatures" | Steve Evangelatos | Benjamin Lapides | December 1, 2017 |
An allergy to gecko milk transforms King Julien into a werewolf-like Night Creature, forcing Clover to fulfill her family legacy as a monster hunter.
| 69 | 4 | "Tears in the Drain" | Emmanuel Deligiannis | Michael Ryan | December 1, 2017 |
A missing persons case turns Julien into a film noir gumshoe, but things get more mysterious when he thinks he solved it.
| 70 | 5 | "Squad Goals" | Steve Evangelatos | Nicole Belisle | December 1, 2017 |
When Julien's new adviser brings social media to the jungle, it has a disastrous effect on his entourage and nearly costs him the kingdom.
| 71 | 6 | "One More Cup, Part 2" | James "Wootie" Wootton | Elliott Owen | December 1, 2017 |
With Julien's help, Karl faces off against his older brother, who wants to replace all of Madagascar's tea stands with Brüs by Bruce coffee kiosks.
| 72 | 7 | "There Will Be Juice" | Emmanuel Deligiannis | Mitch Watson | December 1, 2017 |
After finding a barrel of plant food, Julien decides to supercharge his mango trees, but he ignores Timo's advice on how much food to use.
| 73 | 8 | "Blackboard Jungle" | Steve Evangelatos | Elliott Owen | December 1, 2017 |
When Julien puts his kingdom's students in an islandwide academic tournament, their poor performance spurs him to overhaul the lemur curriculum.
| 74 | 9 | "Lord of the Fruit Flies" | Zesung Kang | Michael Ryan | December 1, 2017 |
King Julien tries to rig an election so that Maurice becomes Mango Prime Minister but soon realizes his opponent, Mort, has a better shot than everyone thinks.
| 75 | 10 | "Karl-Mageddon" | James “Wootie” Wooton | Benjamin Lapides | December 1, 2017 |
After announcing that he and Chauncey will be retiring, Karl hosts a Willy Wonka-inspired competition to choose his replacement as Julien's nemesis. Note: This episode marks the final appearance of Karl.
| 76 | 11 | "King Julien is Watching You" | James "Wootie" Wootton | Nicole Belisle | December 1, 2017 |
Uncle King Julien makes a final attempt to take over the kingdom, but romance distracts him -- causing him to lose sight of his evil plan.
| 77 | 12 | "The End is Near" | Steve Evangelatos | Mitch Watson | December 1, 2017 |
After Clover announces that she will soon be leaving the kingdom, Julien realizes he'll need an army for defense and appoints himself as a drill sergeant.
| 78 | 13 | "The End is Here" | James "Wootie" Wootton | Mitch Watson | December 1, 2017 |
Clover and Sage are getting married, but when Julien throws a bachelor party and accidentally loses the groom-to-be, he has Timo and Dr. S. build a Franken-groom to stand in at the wedding. Note: This is the series finale and it immediately sets up the events of the first film.

== Short films ==
=== All Hail King Julien: New Year's Eve Countdown (2017) ===
All Hail King Julien: New Year's Eve Countdown is a three-minute computer-animated film about celebrating New Year on Madagascar.

=== All Hail King Julien: Happy Birthday to You (2017) ===
All Hail King Julien: Happy Birthday to You is a one-minute computer-animated special, which could be used for the birthday of Julien's fan.
