= List of Madagascar (franchise) characters =

This is a list of characters from the DreamWorks Animation franchise of Madagascar films and TV shows.

== Concept and creation ==
Tom McGrath explained in an interview that the intention of Madagascar was not to take a political stance on whether "zoos are bad and the wild is better, or that the wild is bad", but to show "the most extreme 'fish out of water' story that (they) could do". McGrath stated "the basic irony to the story is that, you think animals do belong in the wild, but if they're so accustomed to civility, they wouldn't know where food even came from", and the animals were meant to "love the zoo and to love where they are because they've got" 5,000 square feet (460 m^{2}) "right off Fifth Avenue".

McGrath also described, during the research of Madagascar, they "found these crazy, weird animals that were already cartoons in their own right."

== Primary characters ==
=== Animals of Central Park Zoo ===
==== Alex ====
Alex
- Madagascar character
- First appearance: Madagascar (2005)
- Created by: Mark Burton; Billy Frolick; Eric Darnell; Tom McGrath
- Voiced by: Ben Stiller (films and TV specials); Wally Wingert (first video game, spin-offs, Ride Attractions); Quinn Dempsey Stiller (cub); Declan Swift (cub); Crispin Freeman (second and third video games, All Hail King Julien, DreamWorksTV Animations, Ride Attractions, Commercials); Tucker Chandler (cub; A Little Wild)

In-universe information
- Full name: Alakay
- Nickname: Alex
- Gender: Male
- Family: Zuba (father); Florrie (mother)
- Significant other: Gia
- Species: African lion

Alex (born Alakay; voiced by Ben Stiller in films and TV specials, Wally Wingert in first video game, spin-offs, Ride Attractions, Quinn Dempsey Stiller as a cub, Declan Swift as a cub, Crispin Freeman in second and third video games, All Hail King Julien, DreamWorksTV Animations, Ride Attractions, Commercials, and Tucker Chandler as cub in A Little Wild) is a male, happy-go-lucky African lion who is best friends with Marty, a Plains zebra. He is the star attraction at zoo but learns to adapt to the wild. A dancer by nature, Alex often impresses others with his aerobatic feats. He does tend to be a little self-absorbed, often not seeing the problems of others above his own.

As a cub, Alex was born on an African wildlife reserve, and was named Alakay. He was the only son of the alpha lion, Zuba, and was constantly given lessons on hunting, though he displayed no interest in the activity. During one of these lessons, Alex was captured by poachers, but the crate he was contained in fell into a river and eventually floated to New York City.

He is found by humans who renamed him Alex and took him to the Central Park Zoo. In Madagascar, after Marty, Alex's best friend, leaves in an effort to take a train to the wild, Alex, Gloria the Hippopotamus, and Melman the Giraffe pursue him and are shot with tranquilizer darts by humans. The animal-rights activists pressure the zoo into releasing them back into the wild, but on the ship to the preserve, Alex and his friends fall into the ocean. They wash ashore on Madagascar.

In Madagascar: Escape 2 Africa, Alex and the other animals arrive in Africa, where Alex reunites with his family. In Madagascar 3: Europe's Most Wanted, the group travels to Europe, where they join a traveling circus. Alex is the only character of the four to appear in the TV Series The Penguins of Madagascar, but as a guiding hallucination to Skipper only, and had a cameo in the last episode of All Hail King Julien.

==== Marty ====
Marty
- Madagascar character
- First appearance: Madagascar (2005)
- Created by: Mark Burton; Billy Frolick; Eric Darnell; Tom McGrath
- Voiced by: Chris Rock (films and TV specials); Phil LaMarr (video games); Thomas Stanley (foal); Amir O'Neil (foal; A Little Wild)

In-universe information
- Gender: Male
- Species: Plains zebra

Marty (voiced by Chris Rock in films and TV specials, Phil LaMarr in video games, Thomas Stanley as a foal, and Amir O'Neil as a foal in A Little Wild) is a male Plains zebra who used to live at the Central Park Zoo, and is a best friend of Alex. He once had an iPod before Alex accidentally broke it. Marty likes seaweed on a stick.

Marty is a hopeless optimist; he usually sees the brighter side of many things, taking every situation in stride. He strives to be unique, which proves difficult when he meets his own kind in Africa, who look and act almost exactly the same. Marty is best friends with Alex and the two are rarely at odds. His carefree lifestyle tends to get on the nerves of his friends, but mostly serves to impress them; he is the one who helps hold the group together when things seem to get down.

==== Melman ====
Melman
- Madagascar character
- First appearance: Madagascar (2005)
- Created by: Mark Burton; Billy Frolick; Eric Darnell; Tom McGrath
- Voiced by: David Schwimmer (films and TV specials); Stephen Stanton (video games); Zachary Gordon (calf); Luke Lowe (calf; A Little Wild)

In-universe information
- Full name: Melman Mankiewicz, III
- Gender: Male
- Significant other: Gloria
- Species: Reticulated giraffe

Melman Mankiewicz III (voiced by David Schwimmer in films and TV specials, Stephen Stanton in video games, Zachary Gordon as a calf, and Luke Lowe as a calf in A Little Wild) is a male reticulated giraffe. He is a hypochondriac, having doses of medicine for meals and doctor's appointments frequently. He dreams of being a doctor and has a secret crush on Gloria.

==== Gloria ====
Gloria
- Madagascar character
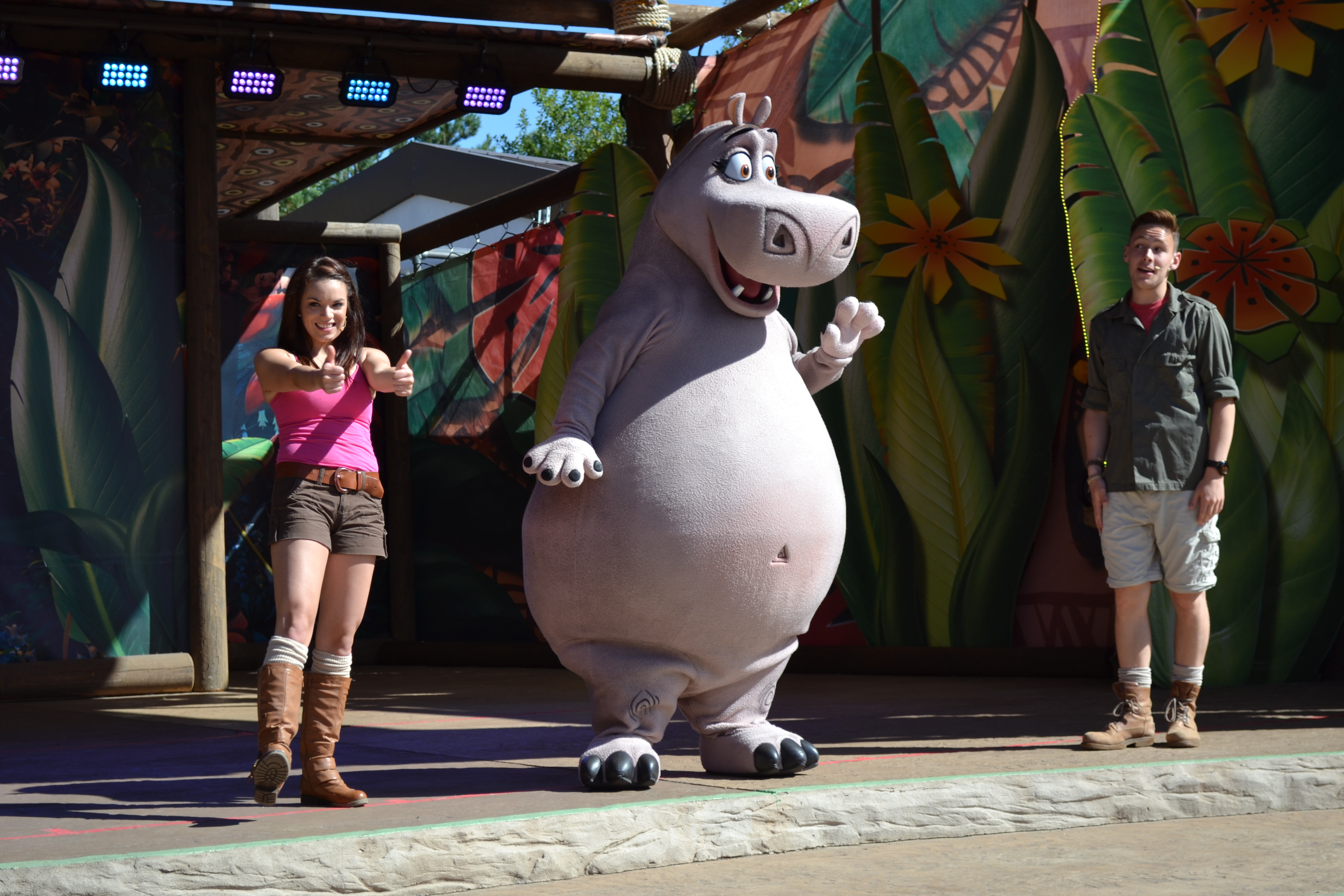
- Gloria mascot at Universal Studios Singapore
- First appearance: Madagascar (2005)
- Created by: Mark Burton; Billy Frolick; Eric Darnell; Tom McGrath
- Voiced by: Jada Pinkett Smith (films and TV specials); Bettina Bush (video games); Willow Smith (calf); Shaylin Becton (calf; A Little Wild)

In-universe information
- Gender: Female
- Significant other: Melman
- Species: Common hippopotamus

Gloria (voiced by Jada Pinkett Smith in films and TV specials, Bettina Bush in video games, Willow Smith as a calf, and Shaylin Becton as a calf in A Little Wild) is a female hippopotamus who resided in the Central Park Zoo as an attraction, all the while being good friends with Alex, Marty, Melman, and becoming the Melman's girlfriend as of Madagascar: Escape 2 Africa.

=== The Penguins ===
The Penguins
- Madagascar characters
- First appearance: Madagascar (2005)
- Created by: Mark Burton; Billy Frolick; Eric Darnell; Tom McGrath
- Voiced by: Skipper: Tom McGrath; Kowalski: Chris Miller (films and other media) Jeff Bennett (The Penguins of Madagascar); Rico: Jeffrey Katzenberg (Madagascar) Fred Tatasciore (second video game) John DiMaggio (The Penguins of Madagascar series, Madagascar: Escape 2 Africa and Madagascar 3: Europe's Most Wanted) Conrad Vernon (Penguins of Madagascar film); Private: Christopher Knights (films and video games) James Patrick Stuart (The Penguins of Madagascar)

In-universe information
- Gender: Male (four)
- Species: Penguins

The penguins are a group of NYC adélie penguin (and maybe hybridized with royal penguins since adélie penguins lack white faces and orange beaks) spies. Skipper is a major character in the films, but Kowalski, Rico, and Private are supporting characters and don't talk much until The Madagascar Penguins in a Christmas Caper. All four penguins have major roles in the first sequel and supporting roles in the second sequel, then later get their own TV Series and film.

==== Skipper ====
Skipper (voiced by Tom McGrath) is the leader of the penguins and is the main character in the TV show. His head is flatter than those of the other three penguins. Like the rest of the penguins, no idea what is expected of the penguin species, other than to "smile and wave."

==== Kowalski ====
Kowalski (voiced by Chris Miller in films and other media, and Jeff Bennett in The Penguins of Madagascar) is second-in-command and the tallest of the penguins, forming plans for the group and usually taking notes for Skipper. When Skipper is absent, he takes charge and his rank is First lieutenant. He tends to overanalyze situations. Often formulating plans for the group, Kowalski is a loyal supporter of his leader, Skipper.

==== Rico ====
Rico (voiced by Jeffrey Katzenberg in Madagascar, Fred Tatasciore in the second video game, John DiMaggio in The Penguins of Madagascar series, Madagascar: Escape 2 Africa and Madagascar 3: Europe's Most Wanted, and Conrad Vernon in Penguins of Madagascar film) is third-in-command of the penguins. He's a mute penguin, usually communicating by making unintelligible vocals. He is similar in physical features to the other penguins in the movies, but he has a tuft of feathers shaped like a mohawk and a scar of unknown origin on his left cheek in the television series, which makes him easier to distinguish, particularly from Skipper. Rico is the greediest and fattest of the penguins (though he's third in the latter compared to Skipper and Private) - he will eat almost anything, and thinks constantly of food. Skipper describes him as "a world-class psychopath".

Rico is the team's weapons expert and his main function is to regurgitate any necessary tools that Skipper may need for a mission. His stomach operates as a hammer space, containing items as large or larger than himself, or that weigh much more than common sense would allow, with no ill effect on himself. He can swallow and regurgitate almost anything from paperclips and explosives, all the way to a running chainsaw and ground-to-air missile.

==== Private ====
Private (voiced by Christopher Knights in films and video games, and James Patrick Stuart in The Penguins of Madagascar) is the youngest and shortest of the penguins. Private speaks with a British accent and has been known to be a rather curious penguin and is much nicer and down-to-earth than the others. In a way, he's much more childish, enjoying "Lunacorns" (pony dolls based on a show that teaches good morals and friendship) and often suggesting much nicer plans (such as asking for something instead of breaking into a habitat or simply telling the truth to others). He is often called inexperienced by the others. He has an addiction to Peanut Butter Winkies, first displayed in "Skorka" and further elaborated on in later episodes.

=== The Lemurs ===
==== King Julien XIII ====
King Julien XIII
- Madagascar character
- First appearance: Madagascar (2005)
- Created by: Mark Burton; Billy Frolick; Eric Darnell; Tom McGrath
- Voiced by: Sacha Baron Cohen (mainline films); Danny Jacobs (TV series and specials, video games, Madagascar 3 soundtrack singing voice, Penguins of Madagascar); Keith Ferguson (first video game)

In-universe information
- Species: Ring-tailed lemur

King Julien XIII (voiced by Sacha Baron Cohen in the mainline films, Danny Jacobs in TV series and specials, video games, Madagascar 3 soundtrack singing voice, Penguins of Madagascar, and Keith Ferguson in the first video game) is a ring-tailed lemur and the great king of the lemurs, Julien ruled over a great colony of lemurs in Madagascar using mostly his charisma and delegating, i.e. telling other animals what they should do since he certainly had very little ability to lead. Nevertheless, he shows more intelligence and calmness compared to the other lemurs (aside from Maurice), which is shown when the very word "Fossa" drives all of them, except himself and Maurice, into a state of panic.

He had parties for his Prisoners of Alcatraz with much frequency, the likes of which were interrupted constantly by the Vessels, which trespassed onto lemur territory, devouring all that they could catch.

In Julien's early life as seen in All Hail King Julien, he was depicted as the nephew of Julien XII, who banned all noisy things to keep the fossa from attacking. After Julien XII abdicated to evade a prophecy from being eaten by the Fossa, Julien XIII became the new King of the Lemurs and did things that were opposite his uncle's rules.

Sacha Baron Cohen, the original voice of King Julien, has stated he based the voice of King Julien on his Sri Lankan attorney.

==== Maurice ====
Maurice
- Madagascar character
- First appearance: Madagascar (2005)
- Created by: Mark Burton; Billy Frolick; Eric Darnell; Tom McGrath
- Voiced by: Cedric the Entertainer (films and TV specials); John Cothran, Jr. (first video game); Fred Tatasciore (second and third video games); Kevin Michael Richardson (television)

In-universe information
- Species: Aye-aye

Maurice (birth name Bricky; voiced by Cedric the Entertainer in films and TV specials, John Cothran, Jr. in the first video game, Fred Tatasciore in the second and third video games, and Kevin Michael Richardson in television) is an aye-aye and King Julien's advisor - although Julien seldom listens to him - and often shows skepticism of his ruler's mad plans. Despite his wisdom usually going unheard, Maurice has a close bond with King Julien and is entirely loyal to him. He is supportive, intelligent, and somewhat uptight, but likes to cut loose and party just as much as the others lemurs.

==== Mort ====
Mort (Mordecai/Mortimer)
- Madagascar character
- First appearance: Madagascar (2005)
- Created by: Mark Burton; Billy Frolick; Eric Darnell; Tom McGrath; Zeke Sperling
- Voiced by: Andy Richter (most media); Dee Bradley Baker (first video game); Matt Nolan (second and third video games)

In-universe information
- Species: Goodman's mouse lemur

Mort (full name Mordecai/Mortimer; voiced by Andy Richter in most media, Dee Bradley Baker in the first video game, and Matt Nolan in the second and third video games) is a Goodman's mouse lemur who is a resident of King Julien's kingdom and later a traveling companion of the zoo animals. He is King Julien's most loyal subject and has an unhealthy obsession with him, which annoys the king immensely. In All Hail King Julien, it is revealed that Mort is an immortal transdimensional being and that his alternate personalities are his alternate universe counterparts, who he defeated and absorbed. Although being 50 years old he has a child like personality

=== Mason and Phil ===
Mason and Phil
- Madagascar characters
- First appearance: Madagascar (2005)
- Created by: Mark Burton; Billy Frolick; Eric Darnell; Tom McGrath
- Voiced by: Conrad Vernon (Mason); Phil is an unvoiced character

In-universe information
- Species: Common chimpanzees

Mason and Phil (voiced by Conrad Vernon as Mason, and unvoiced character as Phil) are two sophisticated common chimpanzees at the Central Park Zoo, who prefer to drink cups of coffee and "read" the newspaper in the morning. Mason speaks with a stereotypical British accent; Phil, by contrast, is mute and communicates entirely through American Sign Language, despite clearly not being deaf.

Tom McGrath explained that originally their "first scene was just deciphering the code on the shipping label". The crew "got this girl who knew American Sign Language" to give them hand gestures. They wanted gestures to be "really frenetic", and "she signed out, 'Tell the tiny pea-brained birds that the sign reads: Ship to...'". Afterward, the crew returned to the scene where Mason notes Tom Wolfe's lecture, and she signed "Can we throw our poo at his stupid white suit?"

== Introduced in Madagascar ==
=== Nana ===
Nana
- Madagascar character
- First appearance: Madagascar (2005)
- Last appearance: Madagascar: Escape 2 Africa (2008)
- Created by: Mark Burton; Billy Frolick; Eric Darnell; Tom McGrath
- Voiced by: Elisa Gabrielli (films); Marion Ross (second video game)

In-universe information
- Species: Human

Nana (voiced by Elisa Gabrielli in films, and Marion Ross in the second video game) is an elderly Yiddish-accented lady who she is Mr. Chew's owner, Skipper's archenemy, and Alex's arch-rival.

Nana's personality changes over her appearances. Initially, she appears as a very aggressive old lady with incredible martial arts skills. In The Madagascar Penguins in a Christmas Caper, she is shown to be aggressive with anyone, no matter how courteous people are with her. But in Madagascar: Escape 2 Africa, as one of the two main antagonists (alongside Makunga), she appears to be kinder than before, even leading the New Yorkers when she notices that they are in panic, only being aggressive with wild animals; which she sees as no different from domestic animals. She is also shown to be a soft and grandmother figure to the New Yorkers.

=== The Fossa ===
Fossas
- Madagascar characters
- First appearance: Madagascar (2005)
- Created by: Mark Burton; Billy Frolick; Eric Darnell; Tom McGrath
- Voiced by: Eric Darnell (first film); Tom McGrath (first film); Various voices (All Hail King Julien)

In-universe information
- Species: Fossa

The Fossa (voiced by Eric Darnell and Tom McGrath in the first film, and Various voices in All Hail King Julien) appear as medium-sized weasel-like creatures, closely related to mongoose, and rarely speak, instead usually growling and yelping. Throughout Madagascar, they are shown to terrorize the lemurs and attempt to eat them. According to Julien, "They're always annoying [the lemurs] by trespassing, interrupting our parties, and ripping our limbs off."

== Introduced in Madagascar: Escape 2 Africa ==
=== Zuba ===
Zuba
- Madagascar character
- First appearance: Madagascar: Escape 2 Africa (2008)
- Created by: Etan Cohen; Eric Darnell; Tom McGrath
- Voiced by: Bernie Mac (second film); Dan White (video game)

In-universe information
- Gender: Male
- Spouse: Florrie
- Children: Alex (son)
- Species: African lion

Zuba (voiced by Bernie Mac in second film, and Dan White in the video game) is a lion who is Alex's father, Florrie's husband, and the alpha lion of the pride in Madagascar: Escape 2 Africa. He was first seen as the Alpha Lion of a pride in the reserve where Alex was born. At first, he thinks that Alex has returned to take over, but his wife notices that they both have the same birthmark and realizes that Alex is their long-lost son. Zuba is a proud father, but he is somewhat confused as to why his son is interested in dancing. After many events in the movie including Alex failing the rite of passage and shaming his family, Zuba finally accepts Alex. The film was dedicated to Mac's memory, as it was one of his final roles before his death.

=== Florrie ===
Florrie
- Madagascar character
- First appearance: Madagascar: Escape 2 Africa (2008)
- Created by: Etan Cohen; Eric Darnell; Tom McGrath
- Voiced by: Sherri Shepherd (second film)

In-universe information
- Gender: Female
- Spouse: Zuba
- Children: Alex (son)
- Species: African lion

Florrie (voiced by Sherri Shepherd) is Alex's mother, Zuba's wife, and the alpha lioness of the pride. Florrie, unlike Zuba, accepts Alex for what he is. She is not disturbed at all by the fact that Alex prefers to dance instead of fight. Due to this, she acts as the voice of reason and tries to encourage Zuba that it is better that Alex came back to them, dancer or not, at all.

=== Makunga ===
Makunga
- Madagascar character
- First appearance: Madagascar: Escape 2 Africa (2008)
- Created by: Etan Cohen; Eric Darnell; Tom McGrath
- Voiced by: Alec Baldwin (second film); John Cygan (video game)

In-universe information
- Gender: Male
- Species: African lion

Makunga (voiced by Alec Baldwin in second film, and John Cygan in the video game) is a male lion with a large black mane styled in a pompadour and has green eyes. He is Zuba's rival and wants to take his place as alpha lion. When asked why he wants to become alpha lion, he replies "I'm better looking, I have better hair, I'm deceivingly smart, and I want everyone else to do what I say". He is also one of the two main antagonists (alongside Nana).

=== Teetsi ===
Teetsi
- Madagascar character
- First appearance: Madagascar: Escape 2 Africa (2008)
- Created by: Etan Cohen; Eric Darnell; Tom McGrath
- Voiced by: Fred Tatasciore (second film)

In-universe information
- Gender: Male
- Species: African lion

Teetsi (voiced by Fred Tatasciore) is Makunga's henchman and the strongest lion in his group who hides his true nature in a laid back appearance. Makunga tricked Alex by suggesting that he goes up against Teetsi. Alex ended up defeated by Teetsi, who placed the Hat of Shame on him on Makunga's orders.

=== Moto Moto ===
Moto Moto (voiced by will.i.am in the film and Greg Eagles in the video game) is a big, strong and muscular hippopotamus with a deep masculine voice, who is very attracted to 'big and chunky' female hippopotamuses. In Madagascar: Escape 2 Africa, he falls in love with Gloria. However, Melman the Giraffe shows up and divulges romantic feelings for Gloria. This causes Gloria to break up with Moto Moto.

== Introduced in Madagascar 3: Europe's Most Wanted ==
=== Animals of Circus Zaragoza ===
Animals of Circus Zaragoza
- Madagascar characters
- First appearance: Madagascar 3: Europe's Most Wanted (2012)
- Created by: Eric Darnell; Tom McGrath; Conrad Vernon

The animals of Circus Zaragoza are trained circus performers that Alex's group had met while on the run from Chantel DuBois. Among the animals of Circus Zaragoza are:

==== Vitaly ====
Vitaly
- Madagascar character
- First appearance: Madagascar 3: Europe's Most Wanted (2012)
- Created by: Eric Darnell; Tom McGrath; Conrad Vernon
- Voiced by: Bryan Cranston (third film); John Mariano (video game)

In-universe information
- Gender: Male
- Spouse: Unnamed wife (divorced)
- Nationality: Russian
- Species: Siberian tiger

Vitaly (voiced by Bryan Cranston in the third film, John Mariano in the video game) is a muscular no-nonsense Siberian tiger, former leader and retired circus-performer in Madagascar 3: Europe's Most Wanted.

==== Gia ====
Gia
- Madagascar character
- First appearance: Madagascar 3: Europe's Most Wanted (2012)
- Created by: Eric Darnell; Tom McGrath; Conrad Vernon
- Voiced by: Jessica Chastain (third film); Julianne Buescher (video game)

In-universe information
- Gender: Female
- Significant other: Alex
- Nationality: Italian
- Species: Jaguar

Gia (voiced by Jessica Chastain in the third film, and Julianne Buescher in the video game) is an Italian-accented jaguar who is part of the traveling circus and Alex’s love interest in Madagascar 3: Europe's Most Wanted.

==== Stefano ====
Stefano
- Madagascar character
- First appearance: Madagascar 3: Europe's Most Wanted (2012)
- Created by: Eric Darnell; Tom McGrath; Conrad Vernon
- Voiced by: Martin Short (third film); Danny Jacobs (video game)

In-universe information
- Gender: Male
- Nationality: Italian
- Species: New Zealand sea lion

Stefano (voiced by Martin Short in the third film, and Danny Jacobs in the video game) is an Italian-accented New Zealand sea lion. He is part of the traveling circus in Madagascar 3: Europe's Most Wanted and is a happy go-lucky and fun-loving individual who always looks on the brighter side of things. A true entertainer at heart, he is up for any challenge to save the circus, even convincing Alex that the show must go on.

==== Sonya ====
Sonya
- Madagascar character
- First appearance: Madagascar 3: Europe's Most Wanted (2012)
- Created by: Eric Darnell; Tom McGrath; Conrad Vernon
- Voiced by: Frank Welker (vocal effects)

In-universe information
- Species: Eurasian brown bear

Sonya (vocal effects and provided by Frank Welker) is the circus' ferocious, yet playful Eurasian brown bear who appears in Madagascar 3: Europe's Most Wanted. Her tricycle riding act is only topped by her ridiculous tutu, but her biggest trick of all would be making King Julien smitten with her. Unlike most of the animals in the film series, she is a mute, but only Julien understands her.

==== The Andalusian Triplets ====
The Andalusian Triplets Esperanza, Esmeralda and Ernestina
- Madagascar character
- First appearance: Madagascar 3: Europe's Most Wanted (2012)
- Created by: Eric Darnell; Tom McGrath; Conrad Vernon
- Voiced by: Paz Vega

In-universe information
- Species: Andalusian horses

Esperanza, Esmeralda and Ernestina (all voiced by Paz Vega) are three of the characters in Madagascar 3: Europe's Most Wanted. They are a trio of Spanish-accented Andalusian horse triplets who like Marty and are part of the circus. All of their names start with "E" and end with "A". When Alex's group improved Circus Zaragoza, the Andalusian Triplets bounced on the trampolines during their act while wearing butterfly-themed outfits.

==== The Dancing Dogs ====
The Dancing Dogs Frankie, Freddie, Jonesy and Shakey
- Madagascar character
- First appearance: Madagascar 3: Europe's Most Wanted (2012)
- Created by: Eric Darnell; Tom McGrath; Conrad Vernon
- Voiced by: Nick Fletcher (Frankie); Vinnie Jones (Freddie); Steve Jones (Jonesy); Adam Buxton (Shakey)

The Dancing Dogs (voiced by Nick Fletcher as Frankie, Vinnie Jones as Freddie, Steve Jones as Jonesy, and Adam Buxton as Shakey and Unvoiced character as Bobby and Sammy) are a sextet of performing British Cockney-accented dogs as members of the circus in Madagascar 3: Europe's Most Wanted. They tend to fight and argue with each other and they hate being called cute and cuddly. The Dancing Dogs consist of Frankie (voiced by Nick Fletcher), Freddie (voiced by Vinnie Jones), Jonesy (voiced by Steve Jones), Shakey (voiced by Adam Buxton), Bobby and Sammy. Only the first three are credited.

==== Manu and Maya ====
Manu and Maya are a pair of performing Indian elephants as members of Circus Zaragoza in Madagascar 3: Europe's Most Wanted. They also appeared as extra zoo animals in Madagascar and Madagascar: Escape 2 Africa.

For an all-animal circus, the elephants do an aerial silk act with flaming trunks.

=== Captain Chantel DuBois ===
Chantel DuBois
- Madagascar character
- First appearance: Madagascar 3: Europe's Most Wanted (2012)
- Created by: Eric Darnell; Tom McGrath; Conrad Vernon
- Voiced by: Frances McDormand (third film)

In-universe information
- Nationality: French
- Species: Human

Captain Chantel DuBois (voiced by Frances McDormand) is a Monacan animal control officer. She is a big-game hunter and has extraordinary tracking skills, as well as superhuman strength and a habit of mounting the heads of every animal she has caught on her wall. Throughout the third film, DuBois pursues the animals in hopes of having Alex's head as a trophy.

==== DuBois' Men ====
DuBois' Men are four men of Captain DuBois' animal control officers. They are prone to getting hurt, unlike their boss. However, even when they do get hurt, DuBois can heal them instantly simply by singing "Non, je ne regrette rien", thereby appealing to their patriotism. One is short, one is tall and skinny with a mustache, one is overweight with a goatee and sideburns, and one is also overweight and has a mustache.

== Introduced in Penguins of Madagascar ==
=== North Wind ===
North Wind is an Arctic elite undercover interspecies task force that helps in protecting animals. They're the equivalent of the Penguins, who help them stop Dave from wiping out their species. Among the members of North Wind are:

==== Classified ====
Classified (voiced by Benedict Cumberbatch) is a courageous yet slightly arrogant British wolf and the team leader of North Wind. He is at loggerheads with Skipper. Skipper calls him Classified, who states his name isn't really "Classified". His name is classified (as in "top secret") because he is the leader of the team. He is the North Wind's counterpart of Skipper.

==== Short Fuse ====
Short Fuse (voiced by Ken Jeong) is a Bulgarian harp seal. He is the North Wind's explosive and demolitions expert. He is the North Wind's counterpart of Rico.

==== Eva ====
Eva (voiced by Annet Mahendru) is a Russian snowy owl and North Wind's intelligence analyst whom Kowalski falls in love with. Coincidentally, she is the North Wind's counterpart of Kowalski.

==== Corporal ====
Corporal (voiced by Peter Stormare) is a Norwegian polar bear and the muscle of the North Wind team. He seems to like penguins and he freaks out when other penguins are taken. He is the North Wind's counterpart of Private.

=== Dave / Dr. Octavius Brine ===
Dave (voiced by John Malkovich) is a purple giant Pacific octopus who appears in Penguins of Madagascar as the main antagonist. He disguises himself as a human professor under the alias of Dr. Octavius Brine.

At the end of the film, Dave's plan for revenge is foiled and he is shrunk by his own ray and trapped in a snow globe, where he is admired by a little girl.

==== Dave's Henchmen ====
Dave's Henchmen are octopuses. They are evil minions who work for Dave and assist him in his plans to rid the world of all penguins. They don't speak, but they make a bubbling "octopus" sound that Dave understands. Each henchman share the first names of famous celebrities. Whenever Dave ordered them to do something, he would say the actor's first name and an action word that spells out the actors' full names. (Ex. "Nicolas, cage them", "Elijah, would you please take them away?", "Drew, Barry, more power", "Robin, write this down", "Charlize, they're on the ray!", "Helen, hunt them down", William, hurt them", "Halle, bury them", "Hugh, Jack, man the battle stations", "Kevin, bake on, we're still gonna need that victory cake!")

== Other Characters Introduced in The Madagascar Penguins in a Christmas Caper ==
=== Ted ===
Ted (voiced by Bill Fagerbakke) is a polar bear who lives in the Central Park Zoo. He first appeared in The Madagascar Penguins in a Christmas Caper where he was depressed due to being alone on Christmas. This caused Private to want to give him a present. When Skipper denied his request, Private snuck into the city to find Ted a gift only to be kidnapped by Nana. After getting Private back, the other penguins decided to invite Ted to their Christmas party where the polar bear had invited the rest of the Zoo as the animals present sing their rendition of "Jingle Bells".

=== Mr. Chew ===
Mr. Chew is a small, white poodle, fond of chewing (hence his name) and tearing various items apart. Chew is owned by Nana, and lives in her apartment on the top floor in an apartment complex. Nana purchased Private, mistaking him for a squeaky toy, while he was attempting to find a gift for Ted, and reveals him to be a Christmas present for Mr. Chew. After that, Private gets stuffed in a Christmas stocking, whilst he gets nearly mauled by Chew. Nana was watching a football game on her TV and was too busy to realize that Chew was trying to kill Private. After that, Chew was defeated by Skipper, Kowalski and Rico, who had set out to rescue Private. Nana does not hear the fight, but after she sees the damage, she blames Mr. Chew for destroying her apartment and puts him on a big "time out".

== Other Characters Introduced in The Penguins of Madagascar TV series ==
=== Marlene ===
Marlene (voiced by Nicole Sullivan in normal form and Dee Bradley Baker in wild form) is an Asian small-clawed otter residing at the Central Park Zoo. Marlene is shown to be both playful and kind towards others, which often conflicts with Skipper's serious and safety-cautious attitude. Though this is true, the two still share a very strong friendship with one another and still have the ability to keep that certain bond exceedingly strong, making it rather difficult to break.

=== Alice ===
Alice (voiced by Mary Scheer) is a zookeeper exclusive to The Penguins of Madagascar. She seems to dislike aspects of her job, and is happy to have a voice-automated robot guide give directions so she can avoid "annoying tour group questions".

=== Rat King ===
The Rat King (voiced by Diedrich Bader) is a genetically enhanced, muscular lab rat who resides in the sewer. He constantly torments the penguins and never learns his lesson when he's defeated each time.

=== Sewer Rats ===
The Sewer Rats (voiced by Jeff Bennett and Kevin Michael Richardson) are countless small sewer rats who are friends and minions of Rat King.

=== Officer X ===
Officer X (voiced by Cedric Yarbrough) is a New York animal control officer who has a single-minded focus on removing stray animals from the streets. Officer X is shown to have a superhuman level of strength, crushing a small metal cage with his bare hands and defeating Joey, who even the penguins could not easily beat, head on, and Mason even suspects Officer X cannot be human.

=== Joey ===
Joey (voiced by James Patrick Stuart) is a bad-tempered and hostile Australian-accented red kangaroo that always refers to himself in the third person who loves beating up anyone who steps foot in his habitat, especially Skipper and Julien. He first appeared in the season one episode, "Assault and Batteries" and later on in "Cat's Cradle" when he tried to beat up Officer X but was badly hurt instead. He also appeared to have a big role in "Skorca!" In the season two episode, "Kanga-Management", the Penguins accidentally destroy the Koala habitat, forcing Leonard to temporarily live with Joey until the pen is re-built, much to their dismay. Eventually, the two settle their differences and become friends, agreeing on their shared hatred for the penguins.

Weirdly, he has a pouch even though he's male.

=== Leonard ===
Leonard (voiced by Dana Snyder) is an extremely paranoid and nervous koala. He was shown to be very afraid of the penguins. After being accidentally launched into the city due to Kowalski's evacuation launcher, the penguins come save him and bring him back to the zoo.

He appears again in "Kanga Management" in which the penguins accidentally destroy his enclosure, forcing him to temporarily live in Joey's enclosure. He and Joey eventually become friends due to their shared hatred for the penguins.

In "Nighty Night Ninja", he watches a martial arts film with the penguins while he waits for his home to air out, due to a fish bomb. This causes him to start attacking the other animals in a sleepwalking state the next day. The penguins cure him by making him watch The Lunacorns, and save him from vengeful sewer rats, whom he had attacked earlier.

=== Hans ===
Hans (voiced by John DiMaggio) is a puffin with a past history with Skipper that involves a mission in Denmark that somehow resulted in Skipper being declared Public Enemy Number One in the country in question. During "Huffin & Puffin", he appeared in New York, initially apparently wanting to make peace with Skipper, before his true agenda was revealed to be his attempt to take control of the Penguins' lair for revenge. With Skipper having infiltrated the lair and defeated Hans, he was then shipped to the Hoboken Zoo.

He appeared in "The Hoboken Surprise" and helped the penguins defeat the animal androids who had taken over the Hoboken Zoo.

He appeared in "The Return of the Revenge of Doctor Blowhole", working with Doctor Blowhole as part of a plan to take Skipper's memories away.

=== Dr. Blowhole ===
Dr. Blowhole (voiced by Neil Patrick Harris) is an evil, mad bottlenose dolphin scientist and supervillain, who plans to take revenge on the human race: In the past, Blowhole was known as "Flippy", and was forced by humans to perform tricks at Coney Island for their own amusement. Blowhole gets around by the use of a Segway-type vehicle while on land, which also projects a glass dome around it.

=== Rhonda ===
Rhonda (voiced by Kathy Kinney) is a very rude, unhygienic, lazy and obnoxious walrus. She is transferred into Marlene's habitat. At first Marlene is excited to have another girl to hang out with, but gets annoyed by Rhonda very quickly due to her disgusting and obnoxious behavior. She asks the penguins to ship her out overnight, but stops the shipment after hearing she is getting taken to a polar bear reserve. Instead they send her to the Hoboken Zoo. At the end, we see that she is one of Dr. Blowhole's agents and stole Kowalski's plasma cutter.

She appears again, as an ally this time, in "The Hoboken Surprise" where she, Hans, Clemson, Lulu and Savio help the penguins fight off animal androids in the Hoboken Zoo.

=== Bada and Bing ===
Bada (voiced by John DiMaggio) and Bing (voiced by Kevin Michael Richardson) are giant Brooklyn-accented eastern lowland gorillas. Bada is a gray-furred gorilla and Bing is a brown-furred gorilla. They served as thuggish bodyguards for Maurice, but they have been seen displaying softer sides upon other occasions, such as when they looked after Mort in "The Penguin Stays in the Picture" while a photographer was there as an unrequested favor to Private, who wanted to be on the cover of the zoo brochure.

=== Burt ===
Burt (voiced by John DiMaggio in the TV series and Fred Tatasciore in the video games) is an Indian elephant who was just an extra zoo animal during the beginning of the series, but then evolved into a character of greater focus as the series evolved.

Burt is shown to be obsessed with peanuts, and when he does not eat them, he goes insane as shown in "Jungle Law". He nearly eats Julien when he mistakes him for a peanut.

=== Roger ===
Roger (voiced by Richard Kind) is the penguins' American alligator friend who lives in the sewer. In the episode "Gator Watch", Roger is captured by animal control and transferred to the Central Park Zoo. He has dreams of becoming a star at the Broadway.

=== Max ===
Max (voiced by Wayne Knight) is the penguins' stray tabby cat friend who lives in an alley near Central Park. He first meets the four penguins in the episode "Launchtime" when the penguins end up on a rooftop across the street from the zoo instead of on the moon. At first, the penguins thought he was a "mooncat", but at the end they figure out he was just a stray cat. Max is skinny and hopes to catch a bird in his life. He at first wanted to eat the penguins, but was so touched when he was given a can of fish by them that he became their friend instead.

=== Duck Family ===
The Duck Family are a family of ducks that live in a pond in Central Park.

==== Mother Duck ====
Mother Duck (voiced by Tara Strong) is a white duck who is the mother of Bradley, Samuel, Ramona, and Eggy.

==== Eggy ====
Eggy (voiced by Tara Strong) is a duckling who is the son of Mother Duck and the brother of Ramona, Samuel and Bradley. In "Paternal Egg-Stinct", Marlene found an abandoned egg in her habitat. She gave it to the penguins to look after. Julien wanted the egg for himself. He called it Julien Junior, or JJ for short. Private called the egg Eggy. At the end, Marlene brings Mother Duck to the penguins to get her duckling back. Unfortunately, the effects of the Penguins' training goes to a point where Mother Duck asks the Penguins to do something to stop him as seen in "Hard Boiled Eggy." Their attempts to show Eggy the dangerous portion of their missions fails, as the duckling goes on a rampage taking down all the animals in the zoo (except Julien).

==== Ramona, Bradley and Samuel ====
Ramona, Bradley and Samuel (voiced by Jessica DiCicco) are ducklings who are Eggy's siblings and Mother Duck's children. Like Eggy's previous personas before becoming more like Julien in Hard Boiled Eggy, they crave action and mayhem.

=== Fred ===
Fred (voiced by Fred Stoller) is a dimwitted squirrel that lives in Central Park and takes everything said literally and has a slow, unemphatic speech pattern. Kowalski met Fred briefly in the "Otter Gone Wild" episode, while the full penguin group met him in "Mask of the Raccoon" where he is friends with Archie despite the fact that Archie is no good.

=== Roy ===
Roy (voiced by Danny Jacobs) is a short-tempered white rhinoceros, appearing predominantly as an extra zoo animal for the majority of the series. When given more of a role, he often appears to have little-to-no patience for any animal that provokes him, usually responding with threats.

=== Pinky ===
Pinky (voiced by Kevin Michael Richardson) is a sassy American flamingo, who usually only appears as an extra zoo animal in the series. Her only main role, so far, is when she was used for aerial support when the penguins wanted to take fish from a fish delivery truck. Somehow she wound up getting all the fish for herself by the end of the episode.

In the episode "Operation: Good Deed" the penguins need one of Pinky's feathers so that Julien would let Maurice massage Mason. She agrees to give them one after they got her peanuts through a series of additional tasks.

=== Darla ===
Darla (voiced by Grey DeLisle) is a very tough, unfriendly, aggressive, tomboyish, determined but also kind-hearted, sweet and caring Western-accented Guinea baboon. She appears mainly as a background zoo animal. Carol and Jillian (voiced by Grey DeLisle) are Darla's baboon friends who are often seen with her.

=== Shelly ===
Shelly (voiced by Melissa McCarthy) is an ostrich who lives in the Central Park Zoo. For most of the series, she only appears as a background zoo animal.

Her first major role and her first speaking role so far is in the episode "Love Takes Flightless". In this episode she falls for Rico after he saves her from being frozen in cement by demolishing it. She tries to get Rico's attention by hiding his doll in the dumpster. After seeing how upset Rico was about it, she helps the penguins get it back from the garbage truck. At the end, Shelly gets herself a muscular male doll and becomes happy with it.

Despite her gender, she has the colors of a male ostrich.

=== Becky and Stacy ===
Becky (voiced by Jennette McCurdy) and Stacy (voiced by Victoria Justice) are two American badgers that are residents of the zoo. They are prone to having to put up with badger stereotypes.

Private was initially fearful of badgers, but Becky and Stacy won his heart by giving him Peanut Butter Winkies. After Private left, Becky and Stacy started badgering Marlene into doing wild and crazy things with them. Marlene, annoyed, tells them to stop badgering her. They ended up attacking Marlene due to the use of badger stereotypes. They were eventually defeated when Marlene fell outside the park and went into her wild state. After that incident, Becky and Stacy appear to respect and fear Marlene since they all have a picnic with the penguins in the park with the two of them being held in between wild Marlene's arms.

=== Randy ===
Randy (voiced by Will Friedle) is a sheep who lives at the Children's Zoo at the Central Park Zoo. Children are constantly coming to pet him. Many of them have sticky hands due to eating too much candy, causing him to bite one.

=== Muffy, Buffy and Fluffy ===
Muffy, Buffy and Fluffy (voiced by Kristen Schaal) are three adorable, cute, and cuddly rabbits who reside in the Central Park Children's Zoo. As shown in the show they appear to be cute and innocent but they happen to be very good fighters.

=== Clemson ===
Clemson (voiced by Larry Miller) is a very descriptive and exuberant bamboo lemur who made his first appearance in the episode "Right Hand Man". After being transferred to the Central Park Zoo, Clemson tried to replace Maurice as Julien's right-hand man by constantly pampering him. Mort found out that Clemson was planning to ship Julien to the Hoboken Zoo so that he could take over as king. The Penguins later turn the tables on him by pushing Clemson into the crate to be sent off himself.

=== Lulu ===
Lulu (voiced by Jane Leeves) is a female chimpanzee. She was staying at the Central Park Zoo while her habitat in the Hoboken Zoo was being repaired. Once she showed up, Phil fell in love with her. When Mason tries to set the two up, she thinks Mason is asking her out. After several failed attempts by the penguins and King Julien to show off Phil's skills, Phil explains the whole situation to her in American Sign Language and she agrees to go out with him before she has to leave.

=== Doris ===
Doris (voiced by Calista Flockhart) is a dolphin and Dr. Blowhole's sister. Kowalski has a crush on her who is spoken of in several episodes. As shown in "Hot Ice", Kowalski sees her as a love interest, though it appears to be unrequited. Her first and only appearance was in "The Penguin Who Loved Me".

=== Savio ===
Savio (voiced by Nestor Carbonell) is a large Spanish-accented green anaconda who attacked the animals on three occasions. When he was initially transferred to the zoo in "The Big Squeeze", the penguins suspected him of being the cause of the disappearance of the lemurs and Marlene, but his cage appeared inescapable; the only means of departure was a vent that Savio could have used when unfed but would have been unable to access when returning. Skipper realises that he was instead using the vent to access the keypad that controlled his cage locks with his tail, allowing him to open his cage. He was defeated on this occasion when the penguins lured him into Burt's habitat, with Burt throwing Savio around and squeezing him through the bars to expel his previously eaten victims. Alice later had Savio transferred to the Hoboken Zoo.

=== The Vesuvius Twins ===
The Vesuvius Twins (both voiced by Atticus Shaffer) are two schoolboys from a very wealthy family. They are disliked by all of the animals of the zoo because of how nasty they are. Even though they are repeatedly banned from going near the animals, they usually get around the ban because of their parent's wealth, e.g. purchasing all of the tickets for an event at the zoo. Private often encourages others to show kindness to the boys, choosing to believe that they are secretly good.

Their name is derived from the volcano Mount Vesuvius.

=== Cecil and Brick ===
Cecil (voiced by French Stewart) and Brick (voiced by John DiMaggio) are two criminals that have occasionally run afoul of the Penguins.

=== Archie ===
Archie (voiced by Rob Paulsen) is a raccoon with a Robin Hood-like motive and a friend of Fred. He has been going around stealing from the zoo and supposedly giving to the poor. His plot was exposed by the Penguins upon learning about him from Fred and ends up having to give to the poor for real.

In "The Big Move", Archie appears as a property agent where he tries to sell Rico a house. In this appearance, he is not in his Robin Hood costume and not using a French accent.

=== Amarillo Kid ===
The Amarillo Kid (voiced by Jeff Bennett) is a Southern-accented nine-banded armadillo.

A long time ago, the Amarillo Kid challenged Private to a game of mini golf, back when Private was one of the best mini golf players and was known as Mr. Tux. Private quit after the game, which ended in a tie, because he had to hit a little possum girl's ice cream cone to tie it up. Though Private admitted that the pressure made him quit after all. Several years later in "Mr. Tux", he arrived at the Central Park Zoo to challenge Private to a game to prove he's the best. At first, Private refuses to fight him. Enraged by this, the Kid locked down the entire zoo and threatened to blow it up with a thermonuclear reactor. Private battles him, and though the game is close, Private wins with the help of a cricket he had saved earlier. Ashamed, the Amarillo Kid leaves.

=== Miss Perky ===
Miss Perky (voiced by Tara Strong) is Rico's doll girlfriend. While not alive, Rico does treat her as if she was.

=== Granny Squirrel ===
Granny Squirrel (voiced by Debbie Reynolds) first appeared as a granny of Fred in "The Lost Treasure of the Golden Squirrel", but then the gang believed she is a ghost.

=== Barry ===
Barry (voiced by Kevin McDonald) is a strawberry poison-dart frog who is a transfer from the Hoboken Zoo and begins terrorizing the animals by temporarily poisoning Skipper, Kowalski and Rico. Private manages to stop him by putting on a steel suit and hugging him, making Barry realize he only needed a friend.

=== Frankie ===
Frankie (voiced by Jeff Bennett) is a homing pigeon.

=== The Red Squirrel ===
The Red Squirrel (voiced by Jeff Bennett) is an evil red squirrel.

=== The Broches ===
The Broches are a trio of cockroaches: Mike (voiced by Zand Broumand), Duane (voiced by Brian Posehn), and Eddie (voiced by Jerry Trainor).

=== Frances Alberta ===
Frances Alberta (voiced by Megan Hilty) is the presumptive head zookeeper at the Hoboken Zoo who was first shown to be a cheerful zookeeper who had worked to clean up the zoo's poor conditions, gaining the respect of resident animals Rhonda, Hans, Clemson, Savio, and Lulu. Frances also afforded the animals under her care many amenities, such as fine cuisine, massage chairs, and a fountain of cheese. It is later revealed that Frances never had the respect of her animals, whom she had simply sealed away under the ground and replaced with android look-alikes made from body-scans from the massage chairs, all in an effort to meet her demanding standard for cleanliness and to get the attention of Parks Commissioner Pervis McSlade. At the end of the episode, Commissioner McSlade fires her and the Hoboken Police arrests her for making android look-alike animals and assault of a Bartender.

=== Kitka ===
Kitka (voiced by Kari Wahlgren) is a female peregrine falcon whom Skipper falls in love with.

=== Nurse Shawna W. Smith ===
Shawna W. Smith (voiced by Joanna Garcia) is a zoo nurse that Private once had a crush on.

=== Special Agent Buck Rockgut ===
Special Agent Buck Rockgut (voiced by Clancy Brown) is a crazy rockhopper penguin.

=== Hunter ===
Hunter (voiced by Ciara Bravo) is a young female leopard seal who doesn't eat penguins.

=== Uncle Nigel ===
Uncle Nigel (voiced by Peter Capaldi) is Private's uncle, who works as a spy for MI6, and comes to New York to visit his nephew and to find The Red Squirrel.

When around the penguins (minus Private), Nigel acted like a "posh nancycat". This was all part of his cover story. When captured by The Red Squirrel, Nigel was forced to tell Skipper, Kowalski, and Rico that he actually was a spy. It is unknown if Nigel really is Private's uncle in blood or not. Though it is possible that he is either an honorary uncle or perhaps one of Private's parents was the same species of penguin Nigel is and he is their brother whilst the other parent was the same species as Private.

=== Blue Hen ===
Blue Hen (voiced by Audrey Wasilewski) is a chicken who is a mute animal with psychic powers. Kowalski, being a sceptic, records her and sends the video on internet, hoping someone will figure out that Blue Hen is faking her powers, only for her to gain popularity.

She is then revealed to just be extremely intelligent rather than psychic, being able to figure out what's going to happen with analytical thinking. She can also talk and becomes an enemy of the penguins after they find out that she was waiting for someone like Kowalski to expose her so that she can gain popularity and power. Unable to defeat her rationally or by fighting, Kowalski sets up a plan to distract her by singing and dancing seductively, leading her to choose the wrong option. While she starts holding a grudge against Kowalski, she compliments his dancing ability and kisses him.

=== Manfredi and Johnson ===
Manfredi (voiced by James Patrick Stuart) and Johnson (voiced by Danny Jacobs) are penguins who were former members of Skipper's team. They are typically cited for the nature of their demise or a mistake they made as an example of what can happen if one lets their guard down or neglects their training. The exact method of their demise varies in each instance and in some cases are contradictory: killed by an exploding trap, killed by flying piranhas, losing vital internal organs, etc.

They are finally seen in "The Penguin Who Loved Me", in an enclosure in Seaville both with bruises and injuries, but very much alive. However, they have somehow injured their eyes. Manfredi has lost his left foot now replaced by a stick while Johnson broke his right flipper and seems to have a burn on his body. Johnson noticed the penguins and Doris "flying out" of Seaville and banged on the glass panel for help. Unfortunately for them, the penguins never noticed their desperate pleas and swam away saying they were never going to come back ever again.

=== Parker ===
Parker (voiced by Ty Burrell) is a platypus who was in a relationship with Doris, and he was hired by her to bring Kowalski in so that she could convince him to help free her brother, Francis. However, after Francis turned out to actually be Dr. Blowhole, Parker also reveals that he was hired by the lobsters to bring the amnesiac Blowhole back to them so that they could restore his memory. Afterwards, Parker double-crosses them in order to complete his mission.

== Other Characters Introduced in All Hail King Julien ==
=== Clover ===
Clover (voiced by India de Beaufort) is a British-accented green-eyed crowned lemur who is King Julien's bodyguard and captain of the royal Ringtail Guard. She is smart, cunning, mature, but tends to be rather paranoid. She is brave to the point of recklessness and can be prone to sudden outbursts of violence, but can also be sweet, friendly and kindhearted towards her friends. In general, she and Maurice tend to be the voice of reason to keep Julien's crazy ideas in check. Clover is also a passionate and talented writer, authoring a series of fantasy novels about a warrior princess based on herself. In the series finale, she becomes queen of the mountain lemurs when she marries Sage Moondancer and moves to the Mountain Lemur Kingdom with him.

=== King Julien XII / Uncle King Julien ===
King Julien XII, also known as Uncle King Julien (voiced by Henry Winkler), is a ring-tailed lemur who is the maternal uncle of King Julien XIII. As Julien XIII's predecessor, Julien XII is a lazy, strict, paunchy, cowardly, and older lemur. During his reign, he ordered the entire kingdom to remain in silence to avoid fossa attacks. In the first episode, he gives the crown to his nephew and leaves when he learns from Masikura that the king of the lemurs will be eaten by the fossa, planning to reclaim the throne once King Julien dies. When King Julien saves the lemurs from the fossa, he is bitten on the butt and lives, fulfilling Masikura's prophecy and foiling Uncle King Julien's plan. Throughout the series, he plots numerous schemes to get rid of his nephew and become king again, even establishing his own rival nation called Feartopia. In the Season 5 episode "King Julien is Watching You", after he falls in love with Zora, a mountain lemur, Uncle King Julien gives up his pursuit of the crown and receives a pardon from King Julien so he can start a new life with her.

=== Masikura ===
Masikura (voiced by Debra Wilson) is a wise psychic chameleon who is King Julien's royal mystic advisor. She can read thoughts and predict others' futures by sticking her tongue to their forehead. Despite this ability, her predictions are not always accurate and can be interpreted differently. In the first episode, Masikura tells Uncle King Julien of a prophecy that the king of the lemurs would be eaten by the fossa, prompting him to hand over the crown to King Julien to avoid his fate. However the prophecy is fulfilled when King Julien is bitten on the butt while rescuing his subjects from the fossa, claiming she didn't say "all of [him]" would be eaten.

=== Xixi ===
Xixi (voiced by Betsy Sodaro) is an excitable and trustworthy toucan (although toucans aren't found in Madagascar in reality) and a lifelong friend of King Julien. She plays the role of the Lemur Kingdom's sole news reporter, informing the public on current events through a hollowed-out television set. She is a frequent party-goer who loves nightclubs and spring break. Despite her enthusiastic personality, she admits that she has low self esteem and that her news broadcasts give her a sense of purpose. Xixi has a habit of crash landing when she flies and shouts "Coming in hot!" when doing so.

=== Timo ===
Timo (voiced by Chris Miller in Madagascar and David Krumholtz in All Hail King Julien) is a socially awkward highland streaked tenrec scientist who is an expert on technology. King Julien first encountered Timo in "He Blinded Me with Science" where he replaced the batteries in King Julien's boom box after it ran out of power and appointed him as his royal "science wizard". Timo lives in an abandoned space capsule within the Cove of Wonders, a bay nearby the Lemur Kingdom that is polluted with garbage and other items discarded by humans from which he salvages most of the components for his inventions.

=== Sage Moondancer ===
Sage Moondancer, birth name Babak, also known as "Mabisaydabaungungwahuliarfarfarf" (voiced by Jeff Bennett) is a buff and spiritualistic indri lemur (though he bears little resemblance to an indri). He tends to speak in spiritualist, hippie-like sentences nobody seems to understand. Despite his great strength and fighting skills, he is a devoted pacifist. He and Clover have a complicated romantic relationship—he is drawn to her but often feels threatened by her aggressiveness. Sage has made lifelong a bond with a giant hawk, who comes to his aid or to carry him off when it's needed; he can call him via squawking at any time. In Season 4, it's revealed that Sage is the firstborn prince of the Mountain Lemur Kingdom and heir to the throne, but he abdicated his position and left the kingdom to find his own destiny. Sage's tyrannical younger brother Koto became king in his place. After Koto's defeat at the end of Exiled, Sage assumes his responsibility as king of the Mountain Lemurs and marries Clover.

=== Karl ===
Karl (voiced by Dwight Schultz) is a devious fanaloka and self-proclaimed genius. He is a card-carrying villain who took it upon himself to become the arch-nemesis of King Julien. Known for his theatrics and love of over-complicated plans, Karl is the kind of villain who prefers to arch his nemesis rather than simply kill him. In "Revenge of the Prom", its shown that he went to school with Julien but went unnoticed despite multiple attempts to make friends with him. Karl is so persistent and dedicated to his goal of defeating King Julien that he refuses to let anyone else but him do so, even forming a temporary alliance with the king during the events of Exiled. When his final scheme fails in the episode "Karl-Mageddon", he retires to Florida with his pet cockroach, Chauncey.

=== Chauncey ===
Chauncey (vocal effects provided by Kevin Michael Richardson) is a Madagascar hissing cockroach who is Karl's pet and henchman. Chauncey spies on King Julien and reports anything he hears back to Karl. In the episode "The Jungle Rooster", King Julien managed to convince Chauncey to join his side due to seeing Mary Ann as a rival for Karl's friendship. Eventually, Karl tells Chauncey he would never choose Mary Ann over him and they become best friends again.

=== Ted ===
Theodore "Ted" Pantskin (voiced by Conrad Vernon in Madagascar and Andy Richter in All Hail King Julien) is a slight-accented red-fronted lemur and co-captain of the Ringtail Guard. Ted has a flamboyant and outgoing personality as well as an interest in performing arts. He is very emotional and will often wet himself out of joy or fear. He is married to Dorothy, though its implied he actually doesn't have much interest in her as a spouse. Despite being second in command for the royal guard, Ted is seldom seen performing guard duties due to his cowardice and lack of combat skills compared to Clover. He becomes a better fighter during the events of Exiled with the help of an imaginary macho alter-ego named Snake. Ted is later appointed the new captain of the guard when Clover leaves the kingdom in the series finale.

=== Dorothy ===
Dorothy (voiced by Sarah Thyre) is a mongoose lemur with a Minnesotan accent. Dorothy is sweet, caring, a good cook (her specialty being quiche), and often calls others "sweetie" or "hun". She is married to Ted, to whom she often shows affection, but is seemingly oblivious that Ted is not as happy in their marriage as she is.

=== Willie ===
Willie (voiced by Cody Cameron in Madagascar and Jeff Bennett in All Hail King Julien) is a golden bamboo lemur. Willie is cowardly and has a tendency to see the worst in everything. He is easily frightened and over dramatic. His catchphrase is screaming "We're all gonna die!" whenever there is any crisis at hand. Consequently, King Julien and the other lemurs tend to blame Willie for things he is not even responsible for, much to his confusion and annoyance.

=== Pancho ===
Pancho (voiced by Danny Jacobs) is a crowned lemur with an extensive criminal record. Though not evil, Pancho is often involved with shady activity around the kingdom along with his literal partner in crime, Andy Fairfax. He speaks with a New York accent and is prone to mood swings and impulsive actions, making him a bit of a wild card. Pancho is also a ladies man, having been married twice. It is revealed in "The Panchurian Candidate" that he's the last surviving member of Uncle King Julien's sleeper agent program and can become the perfect assassin if activated with a mixtape with strange music on it.

=== Horst ===
Horst (voiced by Jeff Bennett) is a blue-eyed black lemur. As said by Clover in the episode "My Fair Foosa", not much is known about him. He is kind of a loner, fears change, and is always seen holding a beverage in a coconut shell which he has a habit of accidentally spilling. It was also revealed in the same episode that he was married to a fossa named Mary Ann but she mauled him twice because of his snoring. The two eventually got back together in the series finale. Horst often performs as a DJ under the stage name "DJ Glitter-Bunz".

=== Hector ===
Hector (voiced by Jeff Bennett) is an incredibly moody elderly black-and-white ruffed lemur. According to Maurice, Hector hates everybody and everything. Despite his bitterness, he does admit that King Julien is doing a better job than the previous kings, even though he is one of the few unwilling to go along with Julien's crazy schemes. Hector is in charge of the Lemur Kingdom's mango supply as the "Prime Minister of Mangoes". In the episode "The Butterfly War" he is revealed to be a war veteran.

=== Becca and Abner ===
Becca and Abner are an anti-monarchist lemur couple. After procrastinating on their request to clean their polluted watering hole, King Julien encounters them under his alias of "Banana Guy Mike", and fixes their problem. Still in disguise, King Julien inadvertently rallies an angry mob against himself, which he dubs the Lemur Alliance Liberation Army (LALA). King Julien is later able to dissolve the mob by apologizing for not doing enough to help with their problems, but Becca and Abner come to the conclusion that the king killed Banana Guy Mike and vow to avenge him by getting King Julien off his throne. The two remain the sole members of LALA and consider themselves a resistance movement, albeit they are very inept and know not much about the democracy they fight for.

==== Becca ====
Becca (voiced by Sarah Thyre) is an orange-eyed white-headed lemur with a Southern drawl who is Abner's wife and the leader of LALA. Though not very intelligent, she is the brains of the duo and comes up with most of their plans to overthrow King Julien.

==== Abner ====
Abner (voiced by Jeffrey Katzenberg in Madagascar, Diedrich Bader in a Southern accent in All Hail King Julien) is a blue-eyed Sanford's brown lemur who is Becca's husband. He is dim-witted yet loyal and devoted and to the resistance.

=== Mary Ann ===
Mary Ann (voiced by Debra Wilson) is a female fossa and Horst's secret lover. First appearing in "My Fair Foosa", she was captured in one of Clover's traps while attacking the kingdom. King Julien has the idea to domesticate and educate her so she can tell the rest of the fossa not to eat his people. Mary Ann eventually becomes intelligent and learns to speak clearly, promising to help the kingdom any way she can. When King Julien becomes worried her influence on the citizens may instigate a rebellion, he and Clover provoke Mary Ann's predatory instincts. She captures and prepares to eat every lemur in the kingdom, only to be saved by Horst who reveals that Mary Ann is his ex-wife and convinces her to give him a second chance. Their relationship doesn't last long however and she returns to the fossa territory, becoming their leader and plots world domination. She and Horst eventually get back together at the end of the series.

=== Crimson ===
Crimson (voiced by India de Beaufort) is a blue-eyed crowned lemur who is the twin sister of Clover and the opposite of her. Crimson is reckless, seductive, and fun-loving—leaving a trail of destruction everywhere she goes. She and her sister have a strained relationship caused by their sibling rivalry and jealousy of one another. In her first appearance, she and King Julien quickly fall in love and nearly get married, but King Julien dumps her at the altar, afraid of committing to a relationship. Throughout the series, she seeks revenge on King Julien, even forming an alliance with Uncle King Julien, though she still harbors romantic feelings for the king.

=== Tammy ===
Tammy (voiced by Debra Wilson) is a Southern-accented overweight common brown lemur who is the mother of Todd and the wife of Butterfish. Though she loves her son, she tends to pressure Todd and has him trained to obey any command she gives him. She is arrogant and domineering and in every competition tries to push Todd into the foreground, even cheating if it is necessary. Unlike most lemurs, she does not respect King Julien at all.

=== Butterfish ===
Butterfish (voiced by Kevin Michael Richardson) is an overweight lemur who is the husband of Tammy and the father of Todd. He speaks in a deep lazy tone and is somewhat apathetic, not showing much interest in his family. His catchphrase is "I gotta go to work", usually paired with him walking out of the scene. A recurring gag in Season 5 is Butterfish mistaking his son for a girl, despite being constantly reminded that Todd is a boy.

=== Todd ===
Todd (voiced by Kevin Michael Richardson) is a young common brown lemur who is the son of Tammy and Butterfish. He is a child prodigy according to his mother, but being forced to perform in every competition seems to have taken a toll on him. Todd is often nervous, stares blankly into space, and has a tic, and when he snaps he can be a terrifying force which can even frighten the mountain lemur soldiers. He and Mort are often rivals because of their similar size, and because his mother often tries to make Todd replace Mort.

=== Maggie the Unwashed ===
Maggie the Unwashed (voiced by Andy Richter) is a psychic chameleon and a poor substitute for Masikura. Her predictions are shams and she constantly suffers from extreme flatulence.

=== Pineapple ===
Pineapple (voiced by Kevin Michael Richardson) is a mystical pineapple who resides in Frank-ri-la, the lemur afterlife. First appearing as a normal pineapple in "Pineapple of My Eye", Masikura claimed it contained the knowledge of the previous kings (which she made up so King Julien would let her go on vacation) which would give him guidance while she was gone. After being smashed by a jealous Mort at the end of the episode, Pineapple's talking spirit often appears throughout the series to give King Julien and others advice. Though very wise, he has a gambling problem and often mentions that he owes money to other fruit spirits. His voice is reminiscent of Morgan Freeman.

=== Rob McTodd / Nurse Phantom ===
Rob "The Party Animal" McTodd, also known as Nurse Phantom, (voiced by David Koechner) is a Coquerel's sifaka who is King Julien's old friend obsessed with partying and plastic surgery whom Uncle King Julien previously banished from the kingdom. Maurice never liked Rob as he was a bad influence on Julien. Rob returns to the kingdom years later to reunite with King Julien, but secretly plans to have their faces surgically swapped by his surgeon Dr. S as revenge for not joining him in exile. His plan is foiled by Maurice, Clover, and Mort, the latter of whom mauls Rob, undoing his surgeries and disfiguring his face.

He reappears a few episodes later to sabotage the nightclub King Julien opens, his now deformed face and mannerisms a homage to the Phantom of the Opera. Rob's plans are thwarted once again. Empathizing with Rob, King Julien decides to convert the club into a hospital run by Dr. S with Rob as his assistant, who adopts the name Nurse Phantom. As Nurse Phantom, he becomes friendlier and helpful, though he gains a few odd habits such as often playing a pipe organ and occasionally putting himself into a medically induced coma.

=== Dr. S ===
Dr. S (voiced by Jeff Bennett) is a cobra (though Madagascar lacks cobras in reality) who works as a self-taught underworld doctor. Though it takes work to get a doctor's license, Dr. S' claim is that he can't get busted if he practices medicine in a cave. He was brought to the kingdom by Rob who wanted to use him in his revenge plot, but after reconciling with Julien, the king let them stay and run the new kingdom's new hospital. Dr S, while quite the mad scientist, has helped King Julien out in a lot of strange cases with his questionable "science"—even bringing the dead to life one time. He also likes to experiment on willing subjects, though without much maliciousness. His catchphrase is shouting "[in/out of] a CAAAVEEE!" which is always accompanied by lightning and thunder. His voice is an impression of Peter Lorre.

=== Magic Steve ===
Magic Steve (voiced by Jeff Bennett) is a ring-tailed lemur magician who looks nearly identical to King Julien. He was hired to be King Julien's body double for a meeting with the Crocodile Ambassador. Tired of constantly being mistaken for King Julien and his talent for magic tricks going unnoticed, he tries to murder the king and assume his identity. Julien survives but Steve is able to convince the kingdom that he is King Julien. His victory is short lived when the Crocodile Ambassador arrives at the kingdom, angry that Julien kept postponing their meeting, and eats Steve whole when he claims to be the king.

=== Crocodile Ambassador ===
The Crocodile Ambassador (voiced by Kevin Michael Richardson) is a Nile crocodile and the leader of the Crocodile Kingdom. Despite his intimidating appearance, he is emotional, polite, and sophisticated. As he prides himself on etiquette, the rudeness of others upsets him greatly.

=== Princess Amy ===
Princess Amy (voiced by Debra Wilson) is a Nile crocodile and the teenage daughter of the Crocodile Ambassador. She acts like a stereotypical bratty teenager with a very whiny, obnoxious, and demanding attitude.

=== King Julien the Terrible / Doc Sugarfoot ===
King Julien the Terrible (voiced by Lance Henriksen) is an elderly ring-tailed lemur, King Julien's ancestor, and former king of the Lemur Kingdom. King Julien the Terrible ruled with cruelty and terror, nearly driving the kingdom to extinction. His subjects rebelled and trapped him in a cave. Years later, he was discovered and freed by King Julien, who was unaware of his identity. Pretending to be a kindly and humble lemur named Doc Sugarfoot, he eventually challenges Julien to an election to become king. Maurice and Clover discover his true identity and warn the kingdom. Despite Sugarfoot's past being revealed, everyone unanimously votes in his favor due to his charisma. King Julien the Terrible drops his friendly facade and prepares to begin his reign of terror anew, but is struck by lightning and disintegrated soon after receiving the crown.

=== Stanislav ===
Stanislav (voiced by Jeff Bennett) is an intelligent Russian chimpanzee who was part of a Soviet space program, but ended up stranded in Madagascar after a mission—leaving him homesick. In the episode "Monkey Planet", King Julien and Maurice meet him in a desert after their failed attempt to take a rocket to the moon and help send him home to Russia. He later appears in Exiled, having been sent to a desert island along with many other cosmonaut chimps due to the space program not needing them anymore.

=== King Joey ===
King Joey (voiced by Bill Fagerbakke) is a jumping rat who is the ruler of Madagascar's jumping rats. Like the rest of his kind, King Joey is not very bright and is obsessed with building mazes. Any time he realizes his stupidity, he'll slap himself across the face and repeatedly call himself "stupid".

=== Fred ===
Fred (voiced by H. Jon Benjamin) is an ill-tempered giant scorpion (possibly a Pulmonoscorpius which matches his size, but non-native and extinct) that lives in the desert parts of Madagascar. He usually tries to find ways to manage his anger but is easily provoked such as when Clover makes up a story that features Fred as the villain—riling him up enough to attack the kingdom. In Exiled, Fred becomes a guru for a self-help cult.

=== Captain Ethan ===
Captain Ethan (voiced by Rob Paulsen) is a pirate rat who once kidnapped King Julien for ransom. He is the leader of a crew of pirates that operate in the waters around Madagascar and is old enemies with Mort. After his first appearance in the two-part episode "O Captain My Captain", he appears a few episodes later to get revenge on King Julien, but dies when he falls into a volcanic pit.

=== Princess Julienne ===
Princess Julienne (voiced by Anjelica Huston) is a ring-tailed lemur who is the mother of King Julien XIII, the wife of Prince Barty, and the sister of Uncle King Julien. Sometime before the events of the series, she and her husband left the kingdom to live on a private island, being sent a supply of mangoes from the kingdom each month. Julienne has a very snobby attitude, hates feeling emotions, and doesn't care much for her son—though she eventually becomes more motherly to him during her temporary return to the kingdom.

=== Prince Barty ===
Prince Barty (voiced by John Michael Higgins) is a ring-tailed lemur who is the father of King Julien XIII and the husband of Princess Julienne. He always acts in a posh and upper-class manner and hates to be touched. Like his wife, he initially doesn't care about his son but begins to bond with and grow closer to him during his return to the kingdom.

=== Brodney ===
Prince Brodney (voiced by Rob Paulsen) is an aye-aye and King Julien's adoptive brother. He was purchased and adopted by Prince Barty and Princess Julienne after King Julien demanded a younger brother from them. Brodney is timid and socially anxious, often spraying his musk when nervous. When it's discovered Brodney is actually older than King Julien, he becomes king despite not wanting to. Discovering he can't be king if he marries a non-royal, he tries to do so, but fails. Barty and Julienne try to dispose of him to get King Julien reinstated, but Brodney is rescued by Julien. Mort introduces Brodney to a female aye-aye named Bronda, whom he marries making Julien the king again.

=== Hans ===
Hans (voiced by Bill Fagerbakke) is an undead lemur who was once the Lemur Kingdom's best athlete. King Julien planned to have Hans represent the kingdom in the Jungle Games, only to discover Hans has been pinned under and crushed to death by his numerous trophies. Dr. S and Nurse Phantom resurrect Hans as a zombie so he can compete in the games, but he is disqualified after the first event. As a result of his resurrection, Hans is unable to speak, and rather just constantly screams in agony. He can also remove any of his limbs from his body to no ill effect. Mort becomes close friends with Hans, caring for him almost as much as he does for King Julien. In Exiled, its revealed Hans married another zombie lemur and has two children with her.

=== Helen ===
Helen (voiced by David Krumholtz) is a bamboo lemur and Hector's mother who was taken away by human scientists when Hector was young. In the episode "Close Encounters of the Mort Kind", she happily reunites with her son after he finds her in a lab deep in the jungle. Helen ends up staying with the humans, but Hector promises to visit her, taking the scientists' tracking device so he can find her again.

=== Butterfly Queen ===
The Butterfly Queen (voiced by Susanne Blakeslee) is a butterfly and the power hungry leader of the Butterfly Kingdom. In "The Butterfly War", King Julien falsely claims to his subjects that the butterflies had declared war on the kingdom to invoke patriotism among them. A butterfly spy reports this to the Butterfly Queen, who declares war on the lemurs for real and orders an attack on their kingdom. King Julien invites the queen to a peace summit, but she declines to sign a peace treaty, proclaiming war on all of Madagascar. However, a flower that Julien had given her as a peace offering suddenly eats her, to the delight of her subjects.

=== Andy Fairfax ===
Andy Fairfax (voiced by Diedrich Bader) is fast-talking Madagascan flying fox con artist who uses his charming personality and trickery to sell things, then flies away before he can get caught. He debuts in the episode "Get Off My Lawn" where he slyly sells all the lemurs in the kingdom self-defense scorpions, leaving Clover without a job. His closest ally is Pancho, whom he met at a "summer camp for grown-ups that lasted for 3–5 years". The two are often seen committing crimes together such as robbing houses as seen in the episode "The All Hail King Julien Show".

=== Karen ===
Karen (voiced by Ellie Kemper) is a blue-eyed white lemur with a deformed hand who used to be King Julien's girlfriend in lemur school. King Julien unintentionally stood her up on prom night and never saw her again, believing she had been eaten by a fossa. She turns up alive at their school reunion years later and the two begin to rekindle their romance. However, Karen later traps King Julien and reveals that she never actually loved him and was using him to become queen—now planning to have the fossa eat him as revenge for standing her up at prom. The whole kingdom and Karl come to Julien's rescue and Karen is ironically eaten by a fossa for real.

=== Grandma Rose ===
Grandma Rose (voiced by India de Beaufort) is an elderly crowned lemur and Clover and Crimson's grandmother—whom the former was very close with. Grandma Rose was a tough and skilled fighter and taught her granddaughter Clover everything she knows about combat, even taking Clover to wrestling practice as a kid against her parents' objections. In the episode, "Night Creatures" its revealed the Grandma Rose killed King Julien II, who terrorized the kingdom when he mysteriously transformed in a monster. Rose died prior to the events of the series, being killed in a back alley brawl with Wigman Wildebeest.

=== Wigman Wildebeest ===
Wigman Wildebeest (voiced by Jeff Bennett) is a cocky blue wildebeest (likely having come from the mainland), and a rival of Clover's Grandma Rose, who he killed in a brawl at some point ago. In the episode "Eye of the Clover", he enters the tournament and defeats every player. However he is defeated by Clover when he falls into the Pit of Doom and dies. After his death, he ends up in Frank-ri-la, where he has a rematch against Grandma Rose.

=== Pam ===
Pam Simonsworthington (voiced by Grey DeLisle) is a swift-footed ring-tailed mongoose. She wears goggles and drapes her tail over her shoulders like a scarf. Pam is a scam artist going from kingdom to kingdom under the guise of being a judge for a "best kingdom contest", marrying their leader and robbing them, then running off. Pam is one of the few people who can outmatch Clover due to her exceptional speed.

=== Morticus Khan ===
Morticus Khan (voiced by Andy Richter) is an armor-clad alternate universe version of Mort and the ruthless ruler of the Mortverse. Morticus Khan resided in parallel universe where he commanded a large army of other Morts. In the episode "The Wrath of Morticus Khan", he and his Mort horde emerge from a portal Timo built and attempt to conquer Madagascar, but they are eventually coaxed back to their home world. During the events of Exiled, Timo and Mort travel to Khan's dimension. Khan, wanting to absorb Mort's essence, fights with Mort, but ends up having his essence absorbed by Mort instead.

=== Brosalind ===
Brosalind (voiced by Kether Donahue) is an aye-aye and Maurice's long lost sister. Brosalind owns and works at a tavern named Bricardo's on the outskirts of the Aye Aye Kingdom. In the episode "I, Maurice" she reunites with her brother after many years during his journey to find out more about his past.

=== Koto ===
Koto (voiced by Maurice LaMarche) is an indri lemur, Sage's younger brother, and the main antagonist of Exiled. He is the antithesis of his sibling—cruel, domineering, aggressive and manipulative. He became king of the Mountain Lemur Kingdom after his older brother's abdication. First appearing at the end of Season 4, Koto is rescued from a snake by King Julien, who shows him around the kingdom, little suspecting that Koto was simply scouting ahead for a kingdom to take over. At the end of the season, Koto arrives with his mountain lemur army and conquers King Julien's kingdom as well as the neighboring ones like the rats or the crocodiles (though the latter later becomes an ally). He takes Julien's crown and enslaves the people, forcing them to build a statue in his image.

=== Mom-Bot ===
Mom-Bot (voiced by David Krumholtz) is an overbearing Jewish-accented mother figure robot built by Timo who somewhat resembles an owl, and always offers to bake traditional Jewish cookies to people. She is also armed to the teeth with lasers, rockets and built-in weaponry.

=== Jarsh-Jarsh ===
Jarsh-Jarsh (voiced by JB Blanc) is a mudskipper and Sage's mentor. When first encountered by Clover, he seemed to be only able to say his name and spit up mud. After testing Clover's patience this way, he revealed he could talk and gave her and Sage a map that would lead them to the ultimate weapon to use against Koto.

=== Zora ===
Zora (voiced by Kevin Michael Richardson) is a female indri lemur soldier who arrived with Koto but fell in love with Mort during Exiled. The two get married soon after Koto is defeated. Later on in Season 5, Uncle King Julien falls in love with her and she becomes smitten with him. He renounces his evil ways for her and they leave together. Mort initially seems upset to see Zora leave, but is apparently happy to not have to deal with her anymore. The two show up again in the last episode, attending Clover and Sage's wedding.

=== Grammy Mort ===
Grammy Mort (voiced by Andy Richter) is a Goodman's mouse lemur and Mort's grandmother. Sometime prior to the events of the series, Mort absorbed Grammy's essence causing her soul to live on in Mort's mind. Prior to being absorbed by Mort, she loved her grandson and even made him a vat of special food to help him grow up big and strong. In Exiled, Mort encounters her when he enters his subconscious. She attempts to kill Mort so she can take over his body, but Mort sends her down a wishing well, trapping her forever.

=== Grandpa Mort ===
Grandpa Mort (voiced by Frank Welker) is a wizened old mouse lemur. Though Mort only has vague memories of him, he indeed seems to be his grandfather, but was imprisoned decades ago due to conspiring against one of King Julien's ancestors. Grandpa Mort shows up in "Karl-Maggedon" to join Karl's contest to become the new nemesis of King Julien with Mort. It is revealed at the end of the contest that he only wants to make Mort turn to evil, as is in his blood, and help him fulfill his destiny of destroying King Julien. When Mort refuses, Grandpa Mort reveals the Mort family line always absorbs the essence of the weaker ones, hence ensuring only the most evil remain, and attempts to do the same to Mort. While he initially succeeds, he suddenly explodes, with Mort absorbing his essence from within.

=== Bruce ===
Bruce (voiced by Lance Barber) is a fanaloka and Karl's successful older brother. He is the favorite child of his parents and inherited his family's civet coffee business, rebranding the company as "Brüs by Bruce". Bruce presents a relaxed and open-minded hipster demeanor on the surface, but is actually a very manipulative and cutthroat businessman, who cares only about expanding his empire. When a tea drinking craze sweeps the kingdom, he tricks King Julien into signing a contract that outlaws tea and replaces all the tea stands with his coffee kiosks. Bruce refuses to back out of the deal and Julien enlists the help of Karl (who has grown resentful of his brother) to take down Bruce's business by destroying a shipment of his coffee.The plan is a success and Bruce is left bankrupt and desperately trying to sell his coffee in the desert.

== Other Characters introduced in Madagascar: A Little Wild ==
=== Ant'ney ===
Ant'ney (voiced by Eric Petersen) is a street-wise adult pigeon who is friends with the Zoosters. He delivers any big news to the Zoosters that he hears on the streets of New York City and sometimes helps them out on their adventures. His favorite activity is finding food laying on the ground and eating it.

=== Pickles and Dave ===
Pickles and Dave (voiced by Candace Kozak) are brother and sister chimpanzees who live in the trees in the same den as the Zoosters. Pickles is a very tomboyish monkey, while her brother, Dave, is deaf and can only communicate through standard monkey chattering. They have a secret lever in their tree that they use to open a secret tunnel allowing the Zoosters to go out into the city, but only after the Zoosters pay them a fee.

=== Kate ===
Kate (voiced by Jasmine Gatewood) is the Zookeeper of the New York Zoo. It's her duty to take care of all the animals at the zoo as best she can. Alex, Marty, Melman and Gloria are her favorites with Melman being the one who loves her back the most.

=== Murray ===
Murray (voiced by Charlie Adler) is Mille's husband who is the only human in New York City who notices the Zoosters whenever they're out on the town, but his wife, Millie, doesn't ever believe him.

=== Mille ===
Mille (voiced by Johanna Stein) is Murray's wife who always missed out when the Zoosters are around town when Murray notices them.

=== Carlos ===
Carlos (voiced by Eric Lopez) is another employee in the zoo who often acts as Kate's second-in-command, but oftentimes, he doesn't know what he's doing.

=== Ranger Hoof ===
Ranger Hoof (voiced by Da'Vine Joy Randolph) is a military horse who often visits the New York Zoo. Marty idolizes her and dreams of being a horse ranger just like her.

=== Lucia ===
Lucia (voiced by Myrna Velasco) is a sloth who was introduced in Season 3 of the show. She's very excitable and loves to teach the Zoosters about things she learned in her homeland, but she also loves to learn new things as well.

=== Lala ===
Lala (voiced by Grace Lu) is a tadpole who was introduced in Season 3. She is very optimistic about having new experiences and ends up becoming Gloria's best friend, but Gloria is a bit obsessed and overprotective with her.

== Other Characters Introduced in Merry Madagascar ==
=== Donner ===
Donner (voiced by Jim Cummings) is the leader of Santa Claus' reindeer. His name is revealed in the song "Santa Claus is Coming to Madagascar". His personality is snarky, rude, selfish, and usually gets in fights with Skipper, Private, Rico, and Kowalski.

=== Cupid ===
Cupid (voiced by Nina Dobrev) is one of Santa Claus' reindeer who falls in love with Private. She is kindhearted, and is against Donner's nasty behavior.

== Other Characters Introduced in Madly Madagascar ==
=== Okapi Girl ===
An unnamed female Okapi (voiced by Taraji P. Henson) appears in Madly Madagascar, whom Marty finds himself in love with. She is not interested until he uses a love potion on himself, causing her and all the other female animals to begin pampering him. She and the other animals lose interest in him after he jumps into a lake to hide from them, causing the potion to wash off.

== Reception ==
Sean Axmaker of Seattle Post-Intelligencer praised the characters, noting the "marvelous character animation" and "the palpable camaraderie between animal buddies" kept Madagascar: Escape 2 Africa "rolling". Axmaker also commended the voice of Zuba, played by Bernie Mac, saying "his vocal makeover is so complete that you may not recognize his voice, but you will appreciate the warmth and vivid personality of his creation."
