= Merry Madagascar =

2009 film directed by David Soren

- Based on: Characters by Tom McGrath; Eric Darnell
- Written by: David Soren; Eric Darnell; Tom McGrath
- Directed by: David Soren
- Starring: Ben Stiller; Chris Rock; David Schwimmer; Jada Pinkett Smith; Danny Jacobs; Cedric the Entertainer; Andy Richter; Carl Reiner
- Music by: Heitor Pereira
- Country of origin: United States
- Original language: English

Production
- Executive producer: Mireille Soria
- Producer: Joe M. Aguilar
- Editor: James Ryan
- Running time: 30 minutes
- Production companies: DreamWorks Animation; Pacific Data Images (uncredited)

Original release
- Network: NBC
- Release: November 17, 2009

Merry Madagascar is an American animated Christmas comedy television special that was first broadcast on the NBC network on November 17, 2009, which starred the characters from the film series Madagascar, and takes place sometime between the first and second film. It is the second DreamWorks Animation Christmas special, after Shrek the Halls.

It features many of the same voices from the film, including Ben Stiller, Chris Rock, David Schwimmer, and Jada Pinkett Smith. The only major exception was Sacha Baron Cohen as King Julien XIII, who was replaced by Danny Jacobs, who also voices the character in a mid-credits scene of the Penguins of Madagascar spin-off film, along with The Penguins of Madagascar and All Hail King Julien TV series. Carl Reiner provided the voice of Santa Claus.

== Plot ==
Taking place after the events of the first film and before the events of the second film, Alex, Marty, Melman, and Gloria attempt to return to New York City in a hot air balloon for Christmas. However, the lemur population inadvertently thwarts their escape by mistaking them for the "Marauding Red Night Goblin" that visits annually. The "Goblin" then showers the island with coals. Alex shoots it down, discovering it was actually Santa Claus throwing lumps of coal at King Julien for being naughty.

The crash leaves Santa with amnesia, unaware of his responsibilities. The group resolve to deliver the presents and use the sleigh to get back home, but Santa's reindeer won't take orders from anyone other than Santa Claus, so the penguins use Santa's magic dust to fly. Their initial attempts to make deliveries go awry so they decide to dump the gifts at the relevant post offices. However, after crashing into an apartment and unintentionally bringing joy to a little girl, they continue with the deliveries despite the adverse conditions.

Back on Madagascar, while the lemurs are presenting gifts to King Julien for "Julianuary", Santa rediscovers his ability to make toys. He crafts gifts for them all, angering Julien as he feels the focus should be on him. Julien decrees that the lemurs' gifts belong to him. Sifting through the presents alone depresses him; Santa's suggestion of giving a gift lifts his mood.

As the night nears its end, the animals have only enough magic dust for one last trip. Putting aside their desire to go home, they return to Madagascar to rescue Santa Claus. They run out of dust and crash into him, restoring his memory. He thanks the animals for making his deliveries and takes Julien off the naughty list. However, the animals have overlooked a bag for Liechtenstein, so Santa Claus switches to a reserve tank to make the trip before the animals can ask for a ride. The animals resolve to enjoy their Christmas in Madagascar, but King Julien throws a coconut at Alex to get back on the naughty list, causing a lump on his head and amnesia, like Santa Claus before him.

== Cast ==
- Ben Stiller as Alex the lion.
- Chris Rock as Marty the zebra.
- David Schwimmer as Melman the giraffe.
- Jada Pinkett Smith as Gloria the hippopotamus.
- Danny Jacobs as King Julien XIII the ring-tailed lemur.
- Cedric the Entertainer as Maurice the aye-aye.
- Andy Richter as Mort the mouse lemur.
- Carl Reiner as Santa Claus.
- Tom McGrath as Skipper the penguin.
- Chris Miller as Kowalski the penguin.
- Christopher Knights as Private the penguin.
- Nina Dobrev as Cupid the reindeer.
- Willow Smith as Abby.
- Jim Cummings as the Lead reindeer.

Note: Rico the penguin appears, but has no dialogue.

== Awards ==
Merry Madagascar was nominated for six Annie Awards, and won one award for Storyboarding in a Television Production.

Award !	Recipient(s)	Result
Best Animated Television Production	DreamWorks Animation	Nominated
Character Animation in a Television Production	Kevan Shorey	Nominated
Character Design in a Television Production	Craig Kellman	Nominated
Storyboarding in a Television Production	Robert Koo	Won
Voice Acting in a Television Production	Danny Jacobs (Voice of King Julien)	Nominated
Voice Acting in a Television Production	Willow Smith (Voice of Abby)	Nominated

== Home media ==
Merry Madagascar was released on DVD in the United States on November 18, 2009, exclusively at stores of Walmart, and it was widely released on October 11, 2011. The special was released on Blu-ray and DVD on October 30, 2012, as part of compilation titled Dreamworks Holiday Classics. It was re released on DVD on October 1, 2013, along with DreamWorks Animation's other holiday specials Shrek the Halls, Kung Fu Panda Holiday, and Dragons: Gift of the Night Fury, along with feature film The Croods.

== Partnership ==
In July 2011, as part of a strategic partnership between DreamWorks Animation and Gaylord Hotels, Merry Madagascar was presented as the theme of the ICE! exhibit at Gaylord's hotels in Nashville and Maryland. In this presentation, the plot of the film is told through a series of ice sculptures that visitors walk past.
