= Danny Jacobs (actor) =

American actor and comedian

- Born: Daniel Charles Jacobs, Jr. July 7, 1968 (age 58); Detroit, Michigan, U.S.
- Occupations: Actor; comedian
- Years active: 1993–present

Daniel Charles "Danny" Jacobs, Jr. (born July 7, 1968) is an American actor and comedian. Following his voice acting debut in 1999 with an uncredited role in Full Blast, he took over the role of King Julien (originally voiced by Sacha Baron Cohen) in The Penguins of Madagascar (2008–2015) and reprised his role in the Christmas special Merry Madagascar (2009), the Valentine's Day short Madly Madagascar (2013) and All Hail King Julien (2014–2017). He also impersonated Cohen's character Borat Sagdiyev (as well as a cameo appearance as a Pirate with an Eye Patch) in Epic Movie (2007).

Besides King Julien, his voice work includes the role of Rowdy Remington in Kick Buttowski: Suburban Daredevil (2010–2012), Victor Zsasz in Batman: Arkham Asylum (2009) and Batman: Arkham City (2011), Special Agent Porter in Justice League: Doom (2012), Snake / Snakeweed in Teenage Mutant Ninja Turtles (2012), Grifter and Captain Cold in Justice League: The Flashpoint Paradox (2013), Baron Mordo in Ultimate Spider-Man (2016) and Heinrich Zemo in Avengers Assemble (2016).

== Early life ==
Jacobs is a devout Catholic of Lebanese descent. Growing up, Jacobs originally intended to become an NBA player. Jacobs attended Bishop Gallagher High School in Harper Woods, Michigan where he started to become interested in acting after seeing a production of West Side Story, in which he attended the rehearsals. Jacobs would later act in school productions of Grease and The Wiz. He enrolled in Wayne State University where he was in the community theater and later transferred to the University of Arizona where he majored in musical theater. Jacobs was further inspired by his cousin who appeared on the original Broadway rendition of Les Misérables. He moved to Los Angeles where he initially did commercial voice overs as a side gig to his theatrical work. He started animation voice acting as a walla voice actor alongside James Arnold Taylor and Teresa Ganzel.

== Career ==
In 1993, Jacobs originated the role of Chico Fernández in Jeff Daniels' comedy The Vast Difference at the Purple Rose Theatre.

In 1996–97, he won acting awards in Michigan, Florida and Wisconsin for his portrayal of Aram in Richard Kalinoski's "Beast on the Moon."

In 1999, Jacobs landed an uncredited voice role as Curt in Full Blast. He was also a background voice actor for Futurama. In the same year, he appeared in his first live-action role in Get the Hell Out of Hamtown.

Jacobs served as the producing artistic director of the Gem and Century Theatres in Detroit from 2000 to 2002.

Jacobs portrayed Borat Sagdiyev and made a cameo appearance as a Pirate with an Eye Patch in Epic Movie (2007). When portraying the role of Borat, Jacobs did an impression of Sacha Baron Cohen.

Jacobs was a substitute for Baron Cohen as the voice of King Julien in The Penguins of Madagascar, again as an impression of Baron Cohen (Jacobs also provided additional voices in the series). In 2011, he won a Daytime Emmy Award for the role. Jacobs reprised his role in Merry Madagascar (2009) and Madly Madagascar (2013). In 2014–2017, he returned to the role in All Hail King Julien. In Penguins of Madagascar (2014), Jacobs once again reprised his role as King Julien. He had also done voice-overs in various commercials.

In addition to the jobs that led to All Hail King Julien, Jacobs had been doing voice-over work for animated television series, including Phineas and Ferb (in which he provided additional voices) and Teenage Mutant Ninja Turtles (in which he voiced Snake / Snakeweed), as well as several video games. He had said that animation, much like the theatre, gives actors a chance to play a wide range of roles. He said, "I can play any character of any ethnicity, any age, even any gender. And that's a freedom the camera doesn't give you. It's an incredibly freeing thing." He also stated that King Julien is his favorite voice role and would gladly reprise his role if ever asked. Jacobs had received more recognition as King Julien than the character's predecessor Baron Cohen. In Madagascar 3: Europe's Most Wanted (2012), Jacobs provided the singing voice of King Julien for the soundtrack.

He had a voice role in Teen Titans Go! as George Washington.

On July 13, 2015, Jacobs donated to Kids Kicking Cancer and had entertained some children with his King Julien voice.

== Awards and nominations ==
Jacobs was nominated for the 2010 Annie Award for Voice Acting in a Television Production for his voice role of King Julien in Merry Madagascar (2009), but lost the award to Tom Kenny.

He won a 2011 Daytime Emmy Award and 2015 Daytime Emmy Award for his voice role of King Julien in The Penguins of Madagascar (2008–2015) and All Hail King Julien (2014–2017).

- 2010: Annie Award for Voice Acting in a Television Production – Nominated
- 2011: Daytime Emmy Award for Outstanding Performer in an Animated Program – Won
- 2015: Daytime Emmy Award for Outstanding Performer in an Animated Program – Won

== Filmography ==
=== Film ===
Year	Title	Role	Notes
1999	Full Blast	Curt (voice)	Uncredited
2006	Grounds Zero	Omar	
2006	The Mikes	Paramedic	
2007	Epic Movie	Borat Sagdiyev, Pirate	
2008	Madagascar: Escape 2 Africa	Tourist (voice)	
2009	Merry Madagascar	King Julien (voice)	
2011	Batman: Year One	Arnold Flass' Attorney (voice)	Direct-to-video
2012	Justice League: Doom	Special Agent Porter (voice)	Direct-to-video
2012	Madagascar 3: Europe's Most Wanted	Croupier, Circus Master (voice)	
2012	Batman: The Dark Knight Returns	Officer Merkel (voice)	Direct-to-video
2013	Justice League: The Flashpoint Paradox	Grifter (voice)	Direct-to-video
2013	Madly Madagascar	King Julien (voice)	Short film; direct-to-video
2014	Penguins of Madagascar	King Julien (voice)	Cameo; replacing Sacha Baron Cohen
2021	Lego Star Wars: Terrifying Tales	Raam, Protocol Droid, Watto (voice)	

=== Television ===
Year	Title	Role	Notes
2007	Mad Men	Yoram Ben Shulhai	Episode: "Babylon"
2008–15	The Penguins of Madagascar	King Julien, additional voices (voice)	
2010–12	Kick Buttowski: Suburban Daredevil	Rowdy Remington (voice)	
2012	Ben 10: Ultimate Alien	Dr. Pervis (voice)	Episode: "Catch a Falling Star"
2012–13	Teenage Mutant Ninja Turtles	Snakeweed (voice)	2 episodes
2014	Teen Titans Go!	George Washington (voice)	Episode: "Money Grandma"
2014–17	All Hail King Julien	King Julien, Pancho, Buck (voice)	Main role
2015	Pig Goat Banana Cricket	Cuddles Jr., Lasagna, Townsperson, Barbershop Quartet (voice)	2 episodes
2015–17	Be Cool, Scooby-Doo!	Harmon, Madcap, Casper Cosgoode (voice)	2 episodes
2015–18	Miles from Tomorrowland	Admiral Watson, additional voices (voice)	Recurring role
2016	Ultimate Spider-Man	Baron Mordo, Vampire, Man (voice)	2 episodes
2016	Avengers Assemble	Heinrich Zemo (voice)	Episode: "The House of Zemo"
2016	The Mr. Peabody & Sherman Show	Enrico Caruso (voice)	Episode: "Enrico Caruso"
2016–17	Lego Star Wars: The Freemaker Adventures	Raam, Yeppau (voice)	
2016	Transformers: Robots in Disguise	Brother Gunter (voice)	Episode: "Pretzel Logic"
2018–21	Apple & Onion	Various voices	
2018	Lego Star Wars: All-Stars	Raam, Lt. Mundu, Yeppau, Zradca (voice)	
2018–19	Pinky Malinky	Pinky's Dad, additional voices	
2019	The Lion Guard	Kril (voice)	Episode: "Long Live the Queen"
2020	Blood of Zeus	King Acrisius, King Periander (voice)	2 episodes
2020–23	Animaniacs	Starbox, additional voices	Recurring role
2024	Star Wars: The Bad Batch	Avi Singh (voice)	Episode: "Infiltration"

=== Video games ===
Year	Title	Role	Notes
2008	White Knight Chronicles	Nanazel	
2008	Madagascar: Escape 2 Africa	King Julien	
2009	Madagascar Kartz	King Julien	
2009	Batman: Arkham Asylum	Victor Zsasz, Frank Boles, Masked Guard, Robert Sterling	
2009	The Godfather II	Hyman Roth	
2010	Megamind: Mega Team Unite	Conductor	
2010	Marvel Super Hero Squad: The Infinity Gauntlet	Annihilus Bugs	
2010	White Knight Chronicles II	Nanazel	
2011	Batman: Arkham City	Victor Zsasz	
2011	The Penguins of Madagascar: Dr. Blowhole Returns – Again!	King Julien	
2011	Super Star Kartz	King Julien	
2012	Madagascar 3: The Video Game	King Julien, Stefano	
2013	Skylanders: Swap Force	Swarm	
2014	Skylanders: Trap Team	Swarm	
2015	Skylanders: SuperChargers	Swarm	
2017	Dishonored: Death of the Outsider	Aristocrats	
2020	Avengers	Hank Pym	
2023	DreamWorks All-Star Kart Racing	King Julien	

== Discography ==
- "Gonna Make You Sweat (Everybody Dance Now)," performing as King Julien's singing voice (2012)
- "Wannabe," performing as King Julien's singing voice (2012)
- "Hot in Herre", performing as King Julien's singing voice (2012)
- "Afro Circus / I Like to Move It," performing as King Julien's singing voice, along with Marty (Chris Rock) (2012)
- All songs featured here are attributed to the soundtrack of Madagascar 3: Europe's Most Wanted
