= Beast Wars (disambiguation) =

Transformers: Beast Wars is a spinoff franchise from the larger Transformers franchise.

Beast Wars may also refer to:

- Transformers: Beast Wars (comics), comics based on the franchise
  - Transformers: Beast Wars (2021 comic book)
- Beast Wars: Transformers, animated TV series based on the franchise
  - Beast Wars: Transformers (video game)

== See also ==
- Beast Machines, a direct sequel to Beast Wars
- Beast Wars II, a 1998 Japanese Transformers anime series
- Beast Wars Neo, a 1999 Japanese Transformers animated series and toy line
- Transformers (disambiguation)
