= All Hail King Julien =

Animated television series (2014–2017)

- Series logo
- Also known as: All Hail King Julien: Exiled (2017)
- Genre: Animated sitcom Adventure; Science fantasy Dramedy; Political drama Black comedy Satire; Slapstick
- Based on: Characters created by Tom McGrath and Eric Darnell
- Showrunner: Mitch Watson
- Voices of: Danny Jacobs; Andy Richter; Kevin Michael Richardson; India de Beaufort; Henry Winkler; Betsy Sodaro; David Krumholtz; Dwight Schultz
- Opening theme: "Who Da King" by Blaze N Vill
- Composer: Frederik Wiedmann
- Country of origin: United States
- No. of seasons: 5 + Exiled
- No. of episodes: 78 (list of episodes)

Production
- Executive producers: Mitch Watson; Bret Haaland
- Running time: 22 minutes
- Production company: DreamWorks Animation Television

Original release
- Network: Netflix
- Release: December 19, 2014 – December 1, 2017

All Hail King Julien is an American animated television series that stars King Julien, Maurice, and Mort from DreamWorks Animation's Madagascar franchise and canonically takes place in Madagascar before the events of the first film, making it a prequel. It is the second DreamWorks Animation show to be based on the Madagascar franchise.

The series was announced in March 2014 as part of an agreement between Netflix and DreamWorks Animation, under which the studio will develop more than 300 hours of exclusive programming for the service. The series is based on the characters from Madagascar, but is a prequel, set prior to the events of the film series. Danny Jacobs, Andy Richter and Kevin Michael Richardson reprised their roles from previous Madagascar media, while Henry Winkler, India de Beaufort and Betsy Sodaro joined the cast.

The series debuted on December 19, 2014, on Netflix when the first five 22-minute episodes were released. Season 2 was released on October 16, 2015. Season 3 was released on June 17, 2016, Season 4 was released on November 11, 2016, while next season, subtitled Exiled, was released on May 12, 2017. The fifth and final season was released on December 1, 2017. The series showed reruns on Universal Kids in the United States. The show was removed from Netflix globally in November 2023. As of March 2026, the show is now streaming on Kidoodle.TV along with various other shows from DreamWorks Animation Television.

== Premise ==
On an animal-inhabited version of Madagascar, fearmongering "Uncle" King Julien XII runs a tyrannical monarchy in which lemurs must stay silent at all hours to avoid invasion by predator fossa. When spiritual advisor Masikura foretells that the King will be eaten by fossa at dawn, Uncle King Julien abdicates his throne to his nephew, anticipating his nephew's death. The Prince, a notorious party animal, ascends to become King Julien XIII, immediately legalizing noise and public events. After his near-death experience by fossa consumption, the new King embraces his leadership, ensuing an era radically different from his uncle's rule.

With the help of royal advisor Maurice; head of security Clover; and his obsessive lackey, Mort, nephew King Julien XIII leads the kingdom. He impulsively decrees a variety of changes, include false flags, sovereign audiences, opinion polling, water slides, trampolines, caffeinated beverages, art shows, interviews, electric technology, border walls, and other attempted improvements. Few are beneficial to lemur society, while most end in catastrophic failure.

King Julien's haphazard schemes create a complex web of allies, political enemies, and love interests across the island of Madagascar. All the while, his devious uncle enacts elaborate schemes to regain his throne.

== Exiled ==
The Exiled season was a spinoff of the main series, featuring a strong overarching narrative. It takes place between season 4 and 5 and depicts the exile of Julien XIII by the tyrant Koto; the rebellion of the lemur prisoners of war; and Julien's battle to regain control of his kingdom.

=== Setup ===
At the conclusion of Season 4, King Julien barrels off of a waterfall, accidentally killing a giant snake and thereby rescuing Koto, a mountain lemur. Koto thanks King Julien and tells him he is forever in his debt, claiming to be the last of his kind. He tours King Julien's kingdom, noting its weak defenses, before leaving.

Soon, King Julien's kingdom becomes overpopulated with refugees of various species, including giant rats, crocodiles, and aye-ayes. The refugees reveal that Koto is actually the dictator of a militant mountain lemur autocracy.

=== Plot summary ===
King Julien learns that mountain lemur Koto's army has been systematically conquering and enslaving all other kingdoms on the island, and the lemur kingdom is next.

Before he can coordinate a response, Koto's army invades, seizing power in an immediate coup de main. With security chief Clover disempowered and his kingdom surrounded, Julien concedes to Koto's rule. As the new King, Koto deposes Julien, schedules his and Maurice's public execution, then imprisons all surviving lemurs in a POW camp. There, they engage in forced labor, and are euphemistically described as "unpaid interns".

After busting out of his bamboo prison, Julien and Maurice escape onto an abandoned Soviet submarine, where they are joined by sleeper agent lemur Pancho and the amiable lemur Ted. They engage in a variety of adventuring, including nearly being sacrificed to a space tentacle on an island of female Lotus-Eater-like lemurs; rescuing the Shark Lord from dolphins who intend to sell him as a pet to Russian oligarchs; and befriending an army of communist space monkeys, marooned on an island after being abandoned by the former USSR.

Loyal to Julien, Mort attempts to assassinate Koto via harpoon guns, poisoned beverages, and traps, but only manages to injure and maim himself. Amused by Mort's slapstick failures, King Koto employs him as his court jester. Meanwhile, the lemurs plan a clandestine uprising, employing Mort as their informant. All the while, Mort's dissociative episodes become more frequent and more intense.

Meanwhile, after her escape, Clover ensues a quest to achieve enlightenment, joined by Sage Moondancer (the pacifist brother of Koto). Their quest is guided by the wisdom of mudskipper Jarsh-Jarsh, Sage's mentor.

Mort recruits Timo to reactivate his Stargate-like multiverse portal, so they can enlist the army of Morticus Khan, an alternate-dimension version of Mort. Upon their arrival, however, Khan claims he has waited thousands of years to meet Mort. Khan reveals that, like himself, the main Mort is an immortal being, and his split personalities are various versions of himself whose "life essence" he has unwittingly consumed. Khan states his intention to consume Mort, thereby ruling over all Morts, then enter the portal and destroy everything he holds dear, starting with the feet of King Julien. After losing in physical combat, Mort defeats Morticus Khan by vomiting him into the air, then forcibly absorbing Khan's soul into his own body. However, in so doing, he explodes the portal back to King Julien's universe.

To repair the portal, Timo induces Mort to fall into a deep hypnosis and withdraw Smart Mort (his genius monocled British alter ego, usually brought on by caffeine) from his own subconscious. While within his own mind, Mort battles Granny Mort and narrowly escapes revenge from all the other alter-egos he has absorbed.

With the help of his allies, including his evil Uncle King Julien XII and nemesis Karl, Julien successfully defeats Koto and regains his kingdom.

=== Aftermath ===
The fifth and final season takes place after Koto's demise; villains such as Karl and Uncle King Julien decide to give up their evil ways and start a new life. This all leads up to the arrival of Alex on Madagascar (setting the stage of the first film) just as Clover leaves with her husband, Sage Moondancer, on their honeymoon.

== Episodes ==
| Season | Episodes | | Originally released |
|---|---|---|---|
| 1 | 10 | 5 | December 19, 2014 |
| 1 | 10 | 5 | April 3, 2015 |
| 2 | 16 | | October 16, 2015 |
| 3 | 13 | | June 17, 2016 |
| 4 | 13 | | November 11, 2016 |
| Exiled | 13 | | May 12, 2017 |
| 5 | 13 | | December 1, 2017 |

== Cast ==
- Danny Jacobs as:
  - King Julien XIII, a Ring-tailed lemur and the king of the lemurs.
  - Pancho, a crowned lemur.
- Andy Richter as:
  - Mort, a small Goodman's mouse lemur who is the overeager lackey of King Julien, idolizing his leadership and, specifically, his feet.
  - Ted, a friendly and nervous golden bamboo lemur who moonlights as an actor.
- Kevin Michael Richardson as Maurice, an aye-aye and Julien's royal advisor.
- India de Beaufort as:
  - Clover, a crowned lemur who is Julien's bodyguard and Captain of the Ring Tail Guard.
  - Crimson, twin sister of Clover, who becomes villainous after King Julien XIII dumps her on their wedding day. She later betrayed Uncle King Julien to help her sister stop Julien's uncle from having both Clover and Julien killed by Vigman Wilderbeast. In the series finale, Crimson and Clover made amends after Crimson admitted that she was jealous of her because, despite being her parents' favorite, Clover was the one they were most proud of.
- Henry Winkler as King Julien XII, the former lemur king and King Julien XIII's maternal uncle who constantly tries to assassinate his nephew.
- Dwight Schultz as Karl, a fanaloka who also tried to kill Julien.
- David Krumholtz as Timo, a tenrec mad scientist who invents things for King Julien.
- Betsy Sodaro as Xixi, a toucan news reporter, talk show host, and partygoer.
- Sarah Thyre as:
  - Dorothy, a mongoose lemur and Ted's wife.
  - Becca, a hillbilly white-headed brown lemur who is an anti-monarchist and anarchist, leading multiple revolts against King Julien.
- Debra Wilson as:
  - Masikura, a psychic chameleon and royal spiritual advisor.
  - Mary Ann, the first fossa socially "lemurized" by the King, who betrays the kingdom, and previously dated Horst.
  - Tammy, a common brown lemur.
- Grey DeLisle as Pam Simonsworthington, a ring-tailed mongoose.
- Diedrich Bader as Abner, a Sanford's brown lemur.
- David Koechner as Rob “The Party Animal” McTodd, a Coquerel's sifaka and King Julien's old friend with a propensity for plastic surgery. Following his fall from grace, he becomes a parody of the Phantom of the Opera, then becomes the nurse assistant of Dr. S, after which he is referred to as "Nurse Phantom".
- Kether Donohue as Brosalind, an aye-aye bartender and tavern owner, who reveals she is Maurice's sister.
- Jeff Bennett as:
  - Sage Moondancer, a deeply spiritual indri.
  - Willie, an anxious red-fronted lemur whose catchphrase is "We're all gonna die!", and captured once in an episode with the catchphrase "We're all gonna live!" In the introduction of Timo; he previously appeared in the original Madagascar film.
  - Hector, a grumpy black and white ruffed lemur who seems disillusioned with any government.
  - Horst, a blue-eyed black lemur who is seen drinking an unidentified beverage and who used to date Mary Ann; he also moonlights as a disc jockey under the name DJ Glitterbunz.
  - Dr. S, a king cobra and mad scientist/unlicensed doctor who practices medicine “OUT OF A CAVE!” (his catchphrase).
  - Stanislav, a Russian-speaking space chimpanzee who was among many cosmonauts abandoned by the former Soviet Union.
- Maurice LaMarche as King Koto, the tyrannical leader of the indris and Sage's evil brother who is the main antagonist of the 'Exiled' season.

== Reception ==
=== Critical response ===
The series has garnered favorable reviews, receiving critical acclaim particularly for its cultural relevance. Additionally, Jacobs and the rest of the cast were praised for their voice acting in the series.

After the initial release of the first five episodes, Robert Lloyd of Los Angeles Times wrote in his review that the series "succeeds on matters of style, script, timing and performance, not the number of individual hairs rendered in a patch of fur. And Julien delivers on all the important accounts."

=== Accolades ===
| Year | Award | Category | Nominee | Result |
|---|---|---|---|---|
| 2015 | Daytime Emmy Awards | Outstanding Children's Animated Program | Bret Haaland, Mitch Watson, Randy Dormans, Nicholas Filippi, Chris Neuhahn and Katie Ely | Won |
| 2015 | Daytime Emmy Awards | Outstanding Performer in an Animated Program | Danny Jacobs (as King Julien) | Won |
| 2015 | Daytime Emmy Awards | Outstanding Casting for an Animated Series or Special | Ania O'Hare | Won — tied with Teenage Mutant Ninja Turtles |
| 2015 | Daytime Emmy Awards | Outstanding Directing in an Animated Program | Christo Stamboliev | Nominated |
| 2015 | Daytime Emmy Awards | Outstanding Original Song — Main Title and Promo | Will Fuller and Alex Geringas (for "Who's da King") | Nominated |
| 2016 | Daytime Emmy Awards | Outstanding Children's Animated Program | Bret Haaland, Mitch Watson, Randy Dormans, Chris Neuhahn and Katie Ely | Nominated |
| 2016 | Daytime Emmy Awards | Outstanding Performer in an Animated Program | Danny Jacobs (as King Julien) | Nominated |
| 2016 | Daytime Emmy Awards | Outstanding Writing in an Animated Program | Mitch Watson, Michael Ryan, Sharon Flynn, Sonam Shekhawat and Elliott Owen | Won |
| 2016 | Daytime Emmy Awards | Outstanding Directing in an Animated Program | Stephen Heneveld, Christo Stamboliev, James Wootton and Collette Sunderman | Nominated |
| 2016 | Daytime Emmy Awards | Outstanding Sound Editing – Animation | Devon Bowman, Chris Gresham, Andrew Ing, DJ Lynch, Peter Munters, Lawrence Reyes, Ian Nyeste, Mishelle Fordham, Aran Tanchum and Vincent Guisetti | Nominated |
| 2016 | Daytime Emmy Awards | Outstanding Sound Mixing – Animation | Devon Bowman, Vicki Lemar, Aran Tanchum, Ian Nyeste and DJ Lynch | Nominated |
| 2016 | Daytime Emmy Awards | Outstanding Original Song | Frederik Wiedmann and Mitch Watson (for "True Bromance") | Won |
| 2017 | Daytime Emmy Awards | Outstanding Sound Mixing - Animation | D.J. Lynch, Ian Nyeste, Aran Tanchum, Jonathan Abelardo and Mark Mercado | Nominated |
| 2017 | Daytime Emmy Awards | Outstanding Writing in an Animated Program | Mitch Watson, Sharon Flynn, Benjamin Lapides, Elliott Owen and Michael Ryan | Nominated |
| 2017 | Daytime Emmy Awards | Outstanding Performer in an Animated Program | Andy Richter (as Mort, Smart Mort, Morticus Khan and Ted) | Nominated |
| 2017 | Daytime Emmy Awards | Outstanding Performer in an Animated Program | Danny Jacobs (as King Julien and Pancho) | Nominated |
| 2017 | Annie Awards | Outstanding Achievement, Editorial in an Animated TV/Broadcast Production | King Julien Superstar! | Nominated |
| 2018 | Daytime Emmy Awards | Outstanding Special Class Animated Program | Bret Haaland, Mitch Watson and Chris Belcher (All Hail King Julien: Exiled) | Nominated |
| 2018 | Daytime Emmy Awards | Outstanding Performer in an Animated Program | Andy Richter (as Mort, Grammy Mort, and Smart Mort) (in All Hail King Julien: Exiled) | Nominated |
| 2018 | Daytime Emmy Awards | Outstanding Writing in an Animated Program | Mitch Watson, Benjamin Lapides, Elliott Owen, Michael Ryan (All Hail King Julien) | Nominated |
| 2018 | Daytime Emmy Awards | Outstanding Sound Editing – Animation | Devon G. Bowman, Ian Nyeste, Alfredo Douglas, Chris Gresham, DJ Lynch, Lawrence Reyes, Jonathan Abelardo, Mark Mercado, Mishelle Fordham, Alfredo Douglas, Aran Tanchum and Vincent Guisetti (All Hail King Julien) | Nominated |
| 2018 | Daytime Emmy Awards | Outstanding Sound Editing – Animation | Devon G. Bowman, Ian Nyeste, Alfredo Douglas, Chris Gresham, DJ Lynch, Lawrence Reyes, Jonathan Abelardo, Mark Mercado, Mishelle Fordham, Alfredo Douglas, Aran Tanchum and Vincent Guisetti (All Hail King Julien: Exiled) | Won |
| 2018 | Daytime Emmy Awards | Outstanding Sound Mixing – Animation | DJ Lynch, Ian Nyeste, Aran Tanchum, Mark Mercado, Jon Abelardo (All Hail King Julien) | Nominated |
| 2018 | Daytime Emmy Awards | Outstanding Sound Mixing – Animation | DJ Lynch, Ian Nyeste, Aran Tanchum, Mark Mercado, Jon Abelardo (All Hail King Julien: Exiled) | Won |

== See also ==
- The Penguins of Madagascar, another animated series spinoff of Madagascar, produced circa 2009
- Lemur Conservation Foundation
