= Eric Darnell =

American filmmaker (born 1961)

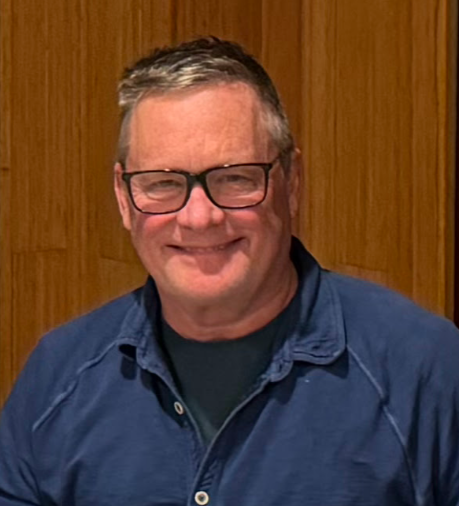
- Darnell in 2025
- Born: 1961 (age 64–65); Prairie Village, Kansas, U.S.
- Occupations: Animator, storyboard artist, film director, writer
- Spouse: Laura Darnell
- Children: 2
- Writing career
- Years active: 1989–present
- Notable works: Antz; Madagascar; Madagascar: Escape 2 Africa; Madagascar 3: Europe's Most Wanted; Penguins of Madagascar

Eric Darnell (born 1961) is an American animator, storyboard artist, director, screenwriter, songwriter and occasional voice actor best known for co-directing Antz with Tim Johnson, as well as co-directing and co-writing Madagascar, Madagascar: Escape 2 Africa and Madagascar 3: Europe's Most Wanted with Tom McGrath, as well as the spin off Penguins of Madagascar (2014) with Simon J. Smith. Darnell now serves as co-founder and chief creative officer of Baobab Studios.

== Life and career ==
Darnell was born in Prairie Village, Kansas. He attended Shawnee Mission East High School in Prairie Village, Kansas, where he was a writer for the school newspaper the Harbinger. He studied broadcast journalism at the University of Colorado at Boulder. After graduating in 1983, he spent four years working on experimental films in his basement, which helped him get accepted into the Experimental Animation program study at the California Institute of the Arts. Meanwhile, he directed the music video for the 1989 R.E.M. song "Get Up".

After graduating in 1991, Darnell joined Pacific Data Images, where he worked as a character animator on the 1991 Hanna-Barbera Halloween special The Last Halloween. He also animated and directed the short film Gas Planet, which won the Ottawa International Animation Festival Special Jury Prize. In 1995, he left PDI to join DreamWorks Animation, where he helped with research and development for The Prince of Egypt. Shortly after DreamWorks merged with PDI the following year, he was assigned to direct his first feature film, Antz, co-directing alongside fellow PDI-turned-DreamWorks employee Tim Johnson. The film, released in 1998, marked the studio's first computer-animated feature film, and the second computer-animated feature film after Pixar's Toy Story. He then worked as a storyboard artist on the 2001 film Shrek, for which he also wrote the song "Welcome to Duloc."

Darnell and Tom McGrath directed Madagascar in 2005 and its sequel, Madagascar: Escape 2 Africa in 2008. He was co-writer for the Christmas TV special, Merry Madagascar. Darnell also co-directed Madagascar 3: Europe's Most Wanted with McGrath and Conrad Vernon, which was released on June 8, 2012. He co-directed, with Simon J. Smith, a Madagascar spin-off, titled Penguins of Madagascar and released on November 26, 2014.

In 2015, Darnell co-founded with Maureen Fan, a former vice president of games at Zynga, a Redwood City, California-based virtual reality studio Baobab Studios to create animated virtual reality short films. Darnell serves as Baobab's chief creative officer, while Fan serves as its CEO. For the studio, Darnell wrote and directed short VR films, Invasion! (2016) and its follow-up Asteroids! (2017), featuring two comedic aliens, Mac and Cheeze. Plans for a feature-length film based on the characters were announced in 2016 by Baobab and Roth/Kirschenbaum Films. Darnell also wrote and directed an animated VR short film, Crow: The Legend, inspired by the Lenape myth. Released in 2018, it features the voices of John Legend, Constance Wu, Oprah Winfrey, Diego Luna and Liza Koshy.

== Personal life ==
Darnell lives in Campbell, California with his wife, Laura, and their son, Rex, and daughter, Leah.

== Filmography ==
=== Feature film ===
Title	Year	Director	Writer	Other	Notes
Campfire Tales	1997	No	No	Yes	Office production assistant: additional photography
Antz	1998	Yes	No	Yes	Additional Voices (uncredited)
Shrek	2001	No	No	Yes	Storyboard artist / Lyrics for song "Welcome to Duloc"
Madagascar	2005	Yes	Yes	Yes	Additional Voices
Madagascar: Escape 2 Africa	2008	Yes	Yes	Yes	Additional Voices
Madagascar 3: Europe's Most Wanted	2012	Yes	Yes	Yes	Additional Voices
Penguins of Madagascar	2014	Yes	No	Yes	Executive producer

=== Short film ===
Title	Year	Director	Writer	Other	Notes
Get Up	1989	Yes	No	No	Music video for R.E.M.
Filter Gallery	1991	Yes	No	No	CalArts
The Last Halloween	1991	No	No	Yes	Character animator
Gas Planet	1992	Yes	No	Yes	PDI; animator
Big Smoke	1993	Yes	No	No	PDI
CyberWorld	2000	Segment	No	No	
Merry Madagascar	2009	No	Yes	No	
Invasion!	2016	Yes	Yes	No	
Asteroids!	2017	Yes	Yes	No	
Crow: The Legend	2018	Yes	Yes	No	
Jack: Part One		No	No	Yes	Producer
Bonfire	2019	Yes	Yes	No	
Baba Yaga	2020	Yes	Yes	Yes	Cinematographer
Namoo	2021	No	No	Yes	Executive producer

=== Television series ===
Year	Title	Role
1995	The Simpsons	Computer animation in episode "Treehouse of Horror VI"
2008–2015	The Penguins of Madagascar	Original characters by, creative consultant
2014–2017	All Hail King Julien	Original characters by, creative consultant
2019–2020	Rainbow Rangers	Uncredited storyboard artist for "Otterly Lost", "Got Silk" and "The Lost Puppy"
TBA	The Witchverse	Creator
TBA	InterCats	Co-creator
