= Bat Mitzvah (disambiguation) =

Bat mitzvah (Hebrew: בַּת מִצְוָה), a Jewish coming of age ritual for girls.

Bat Mitzvah may also refer to:

- Bat Mitzvah massacre, a Palestinian terrorist attack in Hadera, Israel
- "Bat Mitzvah Crashers", title of an episode of the series The Mighty B!. See list
- Bat Mitzvah Comes of Age, one of the programs of the Jewish non-profit organization Moving Traditions that runs educational program for teenagers

== See also ==
- Bar Mitzvah (disambiguation)
- Adult bat mitzvah, a bat mitzvah of a female older than the customary age
