= The Mighty B! season 1 =

The Mighty B!
- Season 1
- The Mighty B! "We Got the Bee" DVD cover
- No. of episodes: 20 (whole); 39 (segments)

Release
- Original network: Nickelodeon
- Original release: April 26, 2008 – June 12, 2009

Season chronology
- Next → Season 2

The first season of The Mighty B! originally aired in the United States on Nickelodeon between April 26, 2008, and June 12, 2009. The season was produced by Nickelodeon Animation Studios, Paper Kite Productions and Polka Dot Pictures, and series co-creators Amy Poehler, Cynthia True and Erik Wiese served as executive producers.

The series focuses on Bessie Higgenbottom (Poehler), an ambitious Honeybee scout with a dream of earning more badges than any other Honeybee, and turning into her superhero alter-ego The Mighty B. The season consisted of 38 eleven-minute segments, and one half-hour final titled "Dragonflies". Poehler, True and Wiese had been developing the series several years before its premiere. They talked about making a "female-driven" animated series, and it was picked up by Nickelodeon in early 2006 under the name of Super Scout.

The season received generally positive reviews. One reviewer called Bessie the "female answer to SpongeBob SquarePants". 1.92 million viewers among Kids 2–11 watched the series premiere, and the series averaged 3.1 million viewers each episode during the season.

== Episodes ==
All episodes in this season were directed by Erik Wiese & Larry Leichliter.

No. overall	No. in season	Title	Written by	Storyboarded by	Original release date	Prod. code	Viewers (millions)
1a	1a	"So Happy Together"	Cynthia True & Erik Wiese	Erik Wiese	April 26, 2008 (Note: This episode originally appeared on November 13, 2007 as a sneak peek on a bonus DVD packaged with the DVD release of SpongeBob's Atlantis SquarePantis.)	101A	3.16
In order to earn her Animal Appreciation badge, Bessie Higgenbottom adopts a dog where she names him Happy, and goes to enter in a dog show, but he runs away because he didn't want to be in it in the first place. Bessie apologizes to Happy and he returns. Bessie wins the dog show when it is revealed that Portia's "dog" Precious is really a rat. Note: This is also the only episode that contains minor original music composed by James L. Venable.
1b	1b	"Sweet Sixteenth"	Jessica Chaffin	Chuck Klein	April 26, 2008	101B	3.16
Bessie is eager to ride a new ride at the amusement park called "The Punisher", but is unable to because she is not tall enough to ride it. Every attempt she makes to get in fails. She has to go on the "stupid teacups" now, but Happy shortens the height checker, allowing Bessie to get on the ride, which is accidentally set for two times.
2a	2a	"Bee My Baby"	Story by : Cynthia True & Erik Wiese; Written by : Will Berson	Chuck Klein	April 27, 2008	102A	N/A
When Gwen and Portia plan to go out, they trick Bessie and Penny into babysitting Gwen's five younger siblings. However, while babysitting, Penny and Bessie lose the baby. They chase the baby, while Happy takes care of the other kids. However, after they finally catch the baby, Bessie and Penny are kicked out of the house by Portia and Gwen, who treat themselves to a delicious meal.
2b	2b	"Bee Afraid"	Cynthia True & Erik Wiese	Erik Wiese	April 27, 2008	102B	N/A
Bessie is eager to earn the Happy Camper badge. However, while going on a camping trip, Penny tells a scary story about a nasty girl who was abandoned in the woods, which leads to Portia running away terrified and getting lost in the woods. A bear tries to attack Portia, but she is saved by Bessie, which allows her to earn the Happy Camper badge.
3a	3a	"Artificial Unintelligence"	Dani Michaeli	Piero Piluso & Andy Suriano	May 3, 2008	103A	N/A
In order to earn the Mad Scientist badge at the Honeybee Science Fair, Bessie builds a robot she names Emily. A jealous Portia goes inside Emily, controlling the robot. Meanwhile, Ben and Happy become furious at Emily and team up to destroy her, with Portia being sprayed by black ink during one attempt. Emily goes insane in the Science Fair, breaking every project. As Bessie is about to be disqualified from the science fair, Ben and Happy storm in, having found Emily's brain. They put it back in Emily and Portia is found inside the robot. Bessie wins the Mad Scientist badge.
3b	3b	"We Got the Bee"	John Ross Bowie & Dannah Feinglass	Fred Gonzales	May 3, 2008	103B	N/A
Bessie wants to join Portia's band, "The Pretty Pretty Princesses", but Portia will not let her because of her lack of musical talent, so she becomes the new drummer for Rocky's band, "The Integritones", where she and Portia both rock the whole bay area!
4a	4a	"Li'l Orphan Happy"	John Bowie & Jamie Denbo	Sherm Cohen & Louie del Carmen	May 10, 2008	107A	3.60
It's Mother's Day and Bessie learns that Happy does not know where his mom is. Bessie goes around town looking for her, but once she is found, she starts to teach Happy to break Bessie's rules.
4b	4b	"Body Rockers"	Jessica Gao	Ken Boyer & Louie del Carmen	May 10, 2008	107B	3.60
The Honeybees go on a field trip to the Science Exploratorium. Penny has to go to the bathroom while the other Honeybees are watching a short movie. Bessie goes with Penny to look for one, but they unintentionally get lost in one of the exhibits.
5a	5a	"Bat Mitzvah Crashers"	Jessica Chaffin	Sherm Cohen	May 17, 2008	104A	3.63
Bessie and Penny start crashing bat mitzvahs after attending Penny's neighbor Zanni's, and set their sights on the ultimate bat mitzvah being held by Portia's cousin, Chelsea.
5b	5b	"Super Secret Weakness"	Dani Michaeli	Octavio Rodriguez	May 17, 2008	104B	3.63
Bessie finds out that every superhero has a secret weakness. When she concludes that the Mighty Bee's weakness is zucchini, she plans to rid the whole bay area of the foul vegetable.
6a	6a	"An I See Bee"	Jessica Chaffin	Ray Angrum & Piero Piluso	May 31, 2008	105A	3.03
A fortune teller convinces Bessie that she can see the future, but her sunny predictions for Penny's birthday party are way off the mark, so she attempts to make things right.
6b	6b	"Woodward and Beesting"	Dannah Feinglass	Fred Gonzales	May 31, 2008	105B	3.03
Bessie tries to learn Portia's secret by becoming a reporter for the "Hive Herald", but comes to the ridiculous conclusion that Portia is an alien. The truth: She has laryngitis.
7a	7a	"Doppelfinger"	Will Berson	Louie del Carmen	June 7, 2008	106A	N/A
Bessie begins to follow the advice of Fingere, Finger's evil French cousin, after Finger is injured in an origami competition which leads her and Happy into mischief to win the Origami badge.
7b	7b	"Little Womyn"	Jessica Chaffin	Fred Gonzales & Chuck Klein	June 7, 2008	106B	N/A
Bessie's mom becomes the troop leader and stops giving out badges because of the Honeybee structure and lack of self-expression.
8a	8a	"The Apprentice"	Jessica Chaffin	Sherm Cohen & Fred Gonzales	June 23, 2008	108A	N/A
Portia's mom takes Bessie as her apprentice to boost her cosmetics sales, but Bessie's zeal will give her much more than she anticipated.
8b	8b	"Beenedict Arnold"	Jessica Gao	Ken Boyer	June 24, 2008	108B	N/A
Bessie puts Happy on a strict health-food regimen and workout schedule. Happy is not excited about this and he does not understand that Bessie only wants what's best for him, and leaves Bessie for Portia.
9a	9a	"Boston Beean"	Jessica Gao	Octavio Rodriguez	June 25, 2008	109A	N/A
Bessie is hosting a foreign Honeybee, Sissy Sullivan, who comes all the way from Boston. At first, the girls seem to get along perfectly fine, but when Bessie realizes that Sissy is better than her at everything, it inspires her competitive spirit.
9b	9b	"Penny Hearts Joey"	Story by : Nicholas Cofrancesco; Written by : Dannah Feinglass	Lynne Naylor	June 26, 2008	109B	N/A
Penny develops a special connection with an animatronic kangaroo from a pizza arcade.
10a	10a	"Ten Little Honeybees"	Jessica Gao	Chuck Klein	June 27, 2008	110A	N/A
Portia's locket disappears during her birthday party, so Bessie goes on the case to try to find it.
10b	10b	"Toot Toot"	Cynthia True & Erik Wiese	Ken Boyer, Piero Piluso & Bernie Petterson	November 29, 2008	110B	N/A
Bessie accidentally farts during a troop meeting (because of her lactose intolerance) and is banned and shunned from the Honeybees which in turn bring them horrible haunting situations and they try to get Bessie back. And Bessie reveals a badge that has never been given out before or is long-gone: the Toot Toot badge.
11a	11a	"Night Howl"	Jessica Chaffin	Eddie Trigueros & Sherm Cohen	September 9, 2008	113A	N/A
Bessie finds out Happy is leading a double life and going out every night to a bar.
11b	11b	"Hat Trick"	Story by : Cynthia True & Erik Wiese; Written by : Jessica Chaffin	Ken Boyer & Fred Gonzales	September 10, 2008	113B	N/A
Bessie uses Happy in her magic act, but he soon gets bored and sneaks off without her knowing, causing a wild menajire to escape from the hat.
12a	12a	"Apoxalypse Now"	Jessica Gao	Chuck Klein	September 11, 2008	114A	N/A
Bessie tries to catch the chicken pox to earn the Chicken Pox badge. When she learns from Ben's mom that he has an immunity, she tries to use him to get the chicken pox. In the end, it turns out Bessie is the one with the immunity, and now she must take care of sick-as-a-dog Ben.
12b	12b	"Hive Jacked"	Jessica Gao	Lynne Naylor	September 12, 2008	114B	N/A
Bessie loses a bet and must let Portia and Gwen run the Hive for the weekend. However, when they refuse to give up the Hive after the ending time, Bessie, Ben, Happy, and Penny go to drastic measures to kick them out, even unknowingly using an outraged skunk in the process.
13a	13a	"Something's Wrong With This Taffy"	Jessica Chaffin, Jessica Gao & Cynthia True	Chris Graham	October 25, 2008	116B	N/A
Bessie sets out to uncover what's wrong with the latest batch of taffy. She finds out that fake honey is making the taffy taste different.
13b	13b	"Name Shame"	Jessica Gao	Eddie Trigueros	October 25, 2008	116A	N/A
Portia finds out that Bessie's middle name is cursed and whenever somebody says it, something bad happens. It becomes a problem after she spreads it around all of San Francisco.
14a	14a	"Bee Patients"	Jessica Chaffin	Eddie Trigueros & Sunil Hall	September 8, 2008	112A	N/A
Bessie and Happy visit the doctor and veterinarian; Bessie is horrified to learn she is due for a booster shot.
14b	14b	"To Bee or Not to Bee"	Jessica Gao	Lynne Naylor	November 29, 2008	112B	N/A
Bessie wins the chance to have tea with Miriam Breedlove, the founder of the Honeybees, but Portia and Gwen sabotage her chance by feeding her false information and odd etiquette.
15a	15a	"Eye of the Honeybee"	Jessica Chaffin	Chris Graham & Ian Graham	January 9, 2009	117A	N/A
Bessie helps Penny find her hidden talent for play ping-pong. Note: This episode hasn't been rerun since its original airing.
15b	15b	"Thanksgiving Beenactment"	Jessica Chaffin, Jessica Gao & Cynthia True	Sunil Hall	November 29, 2008	117B	N/A
Bessie and the Honeybees go on a trip to learn about the Pilgrims, but things go wrong when the Pilgrims accuse Portia of being a witch when she disregards their rule against technology. Note: This episode hasn't been rerun since its original airing.
16a	16a	"Blindsided"	Jessica Chaffin, Jessica Gao & Cynthia True	Eddie Trigueros	January 5, 2009	118A	N/A
Happy takes Bessie's glasses and trades them for a bone. Bessie is unable to see clearly as she stumbles through the city to buy a new pair, leaving her in extreme danger from Portia and Gwen, not including a pack of piranhas from which Happy must repeatedly save her. In the end, he loses his bone to save Bessie, and Bessie finds a replacement as thanks.
16b	16b	"Hen and Bappy"	Jessica Chaffin	Chris Graham & Sunil Hall	January 6, 2009	118B	N/A
The Hippie cooks the wrong recipe. After Ben and Happy eat his tasty treat, they switch bodies, where Happy uses this to get vengeance on Ben. In the end, Bessie and the Hippie switch bodies, and Ben, Happy, Bessie, and the Hippie start to make up one big, weird, body.
17a	17a	"Ben Appetit"	Cynthia True, Jessica Chaffin & Jessica Gao	Louie del Carmen & Sherm Cohen	January 7, 2009	115A	N/A
Bessie tries to get Ben to break his rule about food not touching other foods. In the end, he gets over it, and he and Happy try to get Bessie to get over her claustrophobia with her methods.
17b	17b	"Dang It Feels Good to Be a Gamester"	Jessica Gao	Chris Graham	January 8, 2009	115B	N/A
The Honeybees become preoccupied with playing a new video game and neglect their responsibilities.
18a	18a	"Portrait of a Happy"	Jessica Chaffin	Sunil Hall	June 8, 2009	119A	N/A
Bessie wants to have professional photos taken with Happy, but she must talk the photographer out of quitting his job.
18b	18b	"O Say Can Bess See?"	Jessica Gao	Sunil Hall, Justin Ridge & Ian Graham	June 9, 2009	119B	N/A
Bessie cannot see the hidden image in a magical eyeball poster she receives as an award.
19a	19a	"Macro Mayhem"	Mike Bell	Sherm Cohen, Sunil Hall & Ian Graham	June 10, 2009	120A	N/A
Bessie gets carried away with her new macramé hobby.
19b	19b	"Ben Screams for Ice Cream"	Story by : Cynthia True; Written by : Jessica Chaffin, Cynthia True & Jessica Gao	Lynne Naylor	June 11, 2009	120B	N/A
Bessie lands the ice-cream man in trouble with his boss when she reports that he ran a stop sign. As a result, he leaves the neighborhood and the children suffer in the heat. Will Bessie solve this problem?
20	20	"Dragonflies"	Jessica Chaffin, Jessica Gao, Cynthia True & Erik Wiese	Louie del Carmen, Fred Gonzales & Ian Graham	June 12, 2009	111	N/A
The Honeybees must team up in order to take on a rival scout troop from Oakland for use of the recreation center.

== Production ==
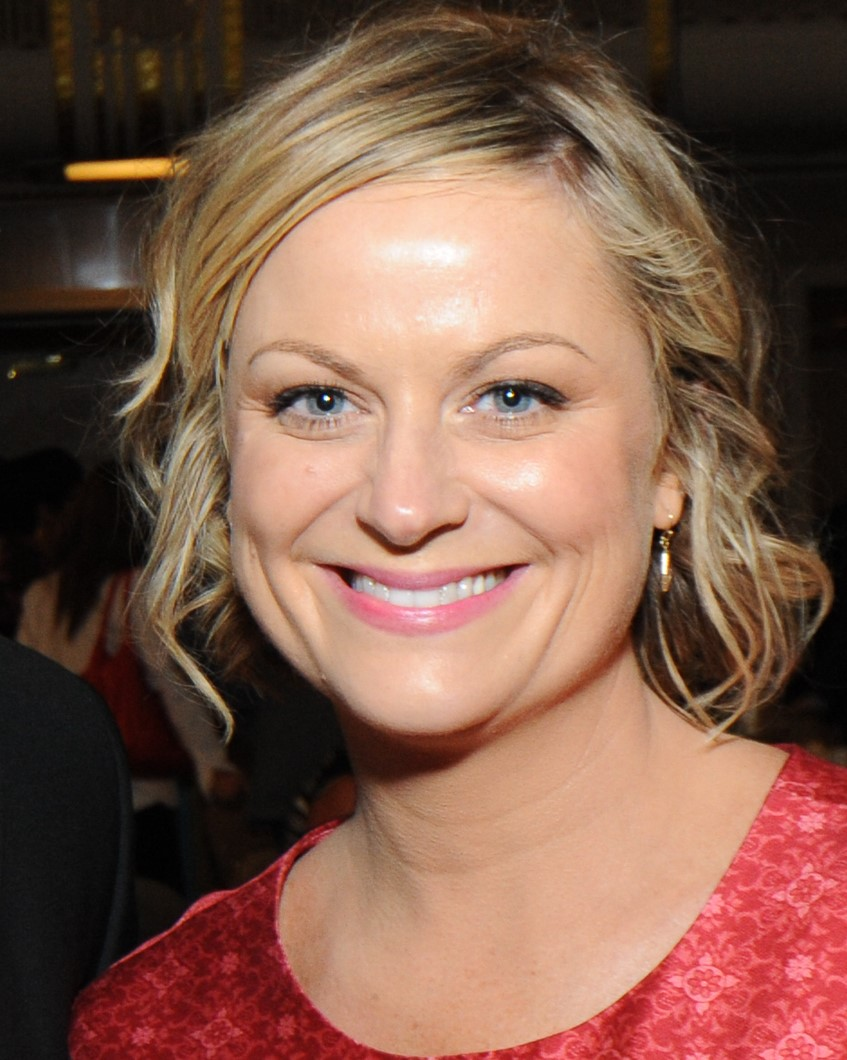
Former SNL Cast member Amy Poehler co-created the show and provides the voice of Bessie.

=== Conception ===
Several years before The Mighty B! premiered, co-creator and former SNL cast member Amy Poehler and her friends at Nickelodeon talked about making a "female-driven" animated television series. Poehler stated; "where this girl is at that great age [...] where you're not boy-crazy and you're not mean to other girls". She found that enthusiasm "fascinating" and wanted to "bottle it and take it like a pill". Bessie is loosely based on a character Poehler had played during her time at improvisational comedy troupes Second City and Upright Citizens Brigade as well as girls she looked up to when she was younger. She described Bessie as a "feisty, plucky, bossy, Honey Bee scout".

The Mighty B! was picked up for a pilot in early 2006 under the name of Super Scout. It was co-created by Poehler, Cynthia True and Erik Wiese. Brown Johnson, president of animation at Nickelodeon, was "absolutely thrilled to have a comedy team of the caliber of Amy, Erik and Cynthia create this iconic character for a new generation".

=== Cast ===
Former SNL cast member Amy Poehler voices Bessie Higgenbottom, a 9¾ year old Honeybee scout. Poehler describes her as "superoptimistic and a super spaz" and "a bit bossy, but with good intentions". She is based on a character Poehler had played during her time at improvisational comedy troupes Second City and Upright Citizens Brigade, but also girls Poehler looked up to when she was younger, which she called "the leaders". Poehler provides the voice of Bessie only, but for the episode "Boston Beean", she provided the voice of Sissy Sullivan, a foreign Honeybee scout from Boston whose voice sounded exactly like Bessie's. Dee Bradley Baker voices Happy, Bessie's dog which she found at the harbor in the first episode "So Happy Together". Andy Richter voices Ben Higgenbottom, Bessie's younger brother. Richter is also the voice of Mort on the Nick show The Penguins of Madagascar. Richter talked about The Mighty B!, quoting: "[...] another dream come true, to be able to do cartoon voices! And, also, to get to do cartoon voices for [Ben and Mort] two really funny, cool cartoons that my kids love and that I'm proud to have them love. It's pretty great." Dannah Feinglass voices Penny, Bessie's sidekick. Feinglass is also a writer for the show. Grey DeLisle voices Portia Gibbons, a Honeybee scout, Megan Cavanagh voices Hilary Higgenbottom, Bessie and Ben's single mother, Sarah Thyre voices Mary Frances Gibbons, Portia's mother, and Jessica DiCicco voices Gwen, Portia's friend.

== Reception ==
=== Critical reception ===
The season received generally positive reviews from television sources and critics. Brian Lowry of Variety said that the show "has the kind of crazed energy and inventiveness that isn't associated often enough with girl-oriented children's fare [...] The Mighty B! opts for a more elevated approach – like that aforementioned roller-coaster jaunt, taking a free-spirited jump off the tracks and trusting its audience to hang on for the ride." David Hinckley of Daily News gave the show four stars, stating: "The Mighty B! has a decent shot at becoming a pre-tween fave." Aaron H. Bynum of Animation Insider called the show a "good, brainless cartoon [...] Viewers shouldn't ever be bored with Bessie [but] the comedy really doesn't try to do too much, which may ultimately work against it when the story calls for the characters to do too little.

Joanne Ostrow of the Denver Post called Bessie the "female answer to SpongeBob SquarePants". Emily Ashby of Common Sense Media gave the show three stars out of five, saying: "The show maintains a chaotic pace, and there are no real attempts to teach strong positive lessons [...] Young tweens will likely enjoy Bessie's outlandish, fantasy-fueled adventures – which are fast-paced and, on the surface, entertaining." Ed Liu of Toon Zone called The Mighty B! a show that he admires more than he "truly love[s]", stating: "There is prodigious talent behind it and its wonderfully energetic, boisterous comedy. It's clearly trying very, very hard to be entertaining and largely succeeds [...] I almost feel bad for not liking The Mighty B! more than I do, and I'm still not sure why I don't enjoy it more". He also said that it was worth pointing out that more recent episodes of the show seem "more assured and funnier" than the eight episodes on the We Got the Bee DVD.

=== Ratings ===
The Mighty B! premiered at 10:30am on April 26, 2008, and scored "above average for Nickelodeon programming" in the Nielsen ratings. It ranked in the top ten of all programming for combined broadcast and basic cable shows, with 1.92 million viewers in the Kids 2–11 demographic and a rating of 5.2/23. The Mighty B! had double the viewership as Bakugan Battle Brawlers, a show that aired simultaneously on Cartoon Network.

In September 2008, the show had an average of 3.1 million viewers, and in the second quarter of 2008, the show ranked among the top five animated programs on television. During the third quarter of 2009, it averaged 2.6 million viewers, and was number-one in its timeslot in the kids 2–11 and kids 6–11 demographics.

== DVD releases ==
A DVD called We Got The Bee was released on February 24, 2009. It contained eight episodes, behind the scenes footage, an animatic version of the episode "Bat Mitzvah Crashers" and a karaoke music video for "Running with the Rainbow Unicorn". A second DVD called BEEing Bessie Higgenbottom was released on December 8, 2009, where it contained seven episodes, a karaoke music video for "Buzz Off", an animatic of the episode "Bee Patients", and audio commentary of the episodes of "Bee Patients", "Ben Appetit", and "Name Shame", provided by Amy Poehler, Andy Richter, Dee Bradley Baker, Grey DeLisle, Erik Wiese, and Eddie Trigueros.
