= The Mighty B! season 2 =

The Mighty B!
- Season 2
- Digital purchase cover
- No. of episodes: 20 (whole); 35 (segments)

Release
- Original network: Nickelodeon (2009–10); Nicktoons (2010–11)
- Original release: September 21, 2009 – June 18, 2011

Season chronology
- ← Previous; Season 1

The second and final season of The Mighty B! began airing in the United States on Nickelodeon on September 21, 2009 and finished airing on Nicktoons on June 18, 2011.

Nickelodeon's animation president Brown Johnson talked about the show, quoting: "The Mighty B! has become a break-out hit for Nickelodeon, complementing and strengthening our powerhouse Saturday morning line-up [...] Fans can look forward to more of Bessie's dare-to-be-different attitude this season as she chases new badges and comes closer to her dream of becoming the Mighty B."

== Episodes ==
No. overall	No. in season	Title	Directed by	Written by	Storyboarded by	Original release date	Prod. code
21	1	"Catatonic"	Erik Wiese & Alex Kirwan	Cynthia True & Brendan Hay, Jessica Gao	Sunil Hall & Carey Yost	October 25, 2009	201
Bessie reluctanly dresses up as a black cat for Halloween, but after Ben accidentally knocks her Bessie gets so in character that Happy can just barely resist chasing her, meanwhile Ben is trying to hide it from Hilary.
22a	2a	"What's the Frequency, Bessie?"	Erik Wiese and Bill Wray	Brendan Hay & Cynthia True & Mike Bell	Aaron Paetz	September 25, 2009	202A
Bessie begins to receive radio signals, after the dentist puts in an abnormally large filling she received.
22b	2b	"Bee Nice"	Erik Wiese & Bill Wray	Jessica Gao Brendan Hay & Cynthia True	Katie Rice & Eddie Trigueros	September 24, 2009	202B
Bessie is worried that she has too much bad karma, so she kills everyone with kindness, in order to get rid of it.
23a	3a	"Dirty Happy"	Erik Wiese & Eddie Trigueros	Brendan Hay	Justin Nichols	September 21, 2009	203A
When Happy refuses to take a bath, Bessie tries everything to trick him into cleaning, but he's one step ahead of her.
23b	3b	"Tour D'Alcatraz"	Erik Wiese & Eddie Trigueros	Story by : Amanda Sitko; Written by : Richard Pursel & Brendan Hay	Kirk Tingblad, Mark Colangelo & David Gemmill	September 23, 2009	203B
Bessie takes Happy on a tour to Alcatraz in order to teach him not to sneak off, but their confused tour guide mistakes Bessie and Penny for two escaped criminals, the tables turn and it's Bessie who ends up needing to get out of the prison.
24a	4a	"Hairy Situation"	Erik Wiese & Eddie Trigueros	Jessica Gao	Sunil Hall, Frank Molieri & Fred Gonzales	September 22, 2009	204A
When Bessie and Happy accidentally drink Hippie's hair potion, and end up unable to keep their hair from growing out of control, their friendship is put to the test, as they fight over who should get the cure.
24b	4b	"Bee Plus One"	Erik Wiese & Bill Wray	Julia Miranda & Cynthia True & Brendan Hay	Carey Yost	January 16, 2010	204B
When Bessie wins two free tickets to the sold-out Sugar Boys concert, everyone wants to be her plus one.
25a	5a	"Bad to the Bee"	Erik Wiese & Bill Wray	Jessica Gao, Brendan Hay & Cynthia True	Justin Nichols	November 14, 2009	205A
When she gets a "bee-merit" for dropping boxes of taffy on the ground, Bessie feels that being good is pointless if you can't be perfect, giving Portia and Gwen a chance to get her to do something really bad.
25b	5b	"Hive of Darkness"	Erik Wiese & Alex Kirwan	Jessica Gao, Brendan Hay & Cynthia True	Aaron Paetz	January 16, 2010	205B
Bessie raises a beehive in order to earn a beekeeping badge, but when she decides to move on after she earns it, the bees are determined not to lose "Queen Bessie" so easily.
26a	6a	"Mr. Turtleton's Wild Ride"	Erik Wiese & Eddie Trigueros	Jessica Chaffin	Chris Graham & Fred Gonzales	November 14, 2009	206A
Bessie has to watch over Millie's pet turtle, Chester Turtleton, for several days. At first, it seems that Mr. Turtleton doesn't fit in with Bessie's lifestyle, but when Millie returns to claim Mr. Turtleton, he doesn't seem ready to give his up new life.
26b	6b	"A Pirate's Life for B"	Erik Wiese & Eddie Trigueros	Jessica Gao	Mike Mullen & David Gemmill	June 18, 2011	206B
Bessie and Happy play pirates, and they find a huge clump of gold.
27a	7a	"Awww-esome"	Erik Wiese & Eddie Trigueros	Cynthia True	Katie Rice	January 2, 2010	207A
Bessie becomes irritated, when she is unable to watch "Puppy Net".
27b	7b	"Dogcatcher in the Rye"	Erik Wiese & Bill Wray	Brendan Hay	Aaron Paetz	January 2, 2010	207B
Bessie decides to run for the office of city dogcatcher.
28a	8a	"Rinx!"	Erik Wiese & Eddie Trigueros	Jessica Gao	Justin Nichols	November 6, 2010	208A
Bessie and Happy play jinx, which results in Happy getting thrown into the dog shelter by Hal the dogcatcher.
28b	8b	"Sleepless in San Francisco"	Erik Wiese & Eddie Trigueros	Brendan Hay	Katie Rice, Kirk Hanson & David Gemmill	November 6, 2010	208B
Bessie sets out to prove that the boogeyman is not under Ben's bed.
29a	9a	"Higgenbottom's 7"	Erik Wiese & Eddie Trigueros	Jessica Gao	Howie Perry	November 13, 2010	209A
Bessie with the help of Happy, Finger, Ben, Millie, Hippie and Penny work together to retrieve Bessie's dollar which got stuck in a vending machine.
29b	9b	"Finger Pickin' Bad"	Erik Wiese & Bill Wray	Cynthia True, Jessica Gao & Brendan Hay	Sunil Hall	November 13, 2010	209B
When Finger makes a new friend, Bessie is forced to spend time with Ronnie.
30a	10a	"It's B's Party"	Erik Wiese & Eddie Trigueros	Jessica Gao	Katie Rice	November 20, 2010	213A
Bessie searches her friends and family, so they can throw her a surprise party. Note: During the end credits and on iTunes, this episode is listed as "It's B's Party and She'll Cry If She Wants To".
30b	10b	"B-Chip"	Erik Wiese & Bill Wray	Julia Miranda	Aaron Paetz	November 20, 2010	213B
Bessie takes Happy, to get an identity chip.
31a	11a	"Old Bee and the Sea"	Erik Wiese & Bill Wray	Brendan Hay	Aaron Paetz	November 29, 2010	214A
Penny gets kidnapped by a mob of gangster fish, while on a fishing trip with the Honeybees.
31b	11b	"One Million Years Bee.C."	Erik Wiese & Eddie Trigueros	Cynthia True, Jessica Gao & Brendan Hay	Steve L'Couilliard & Justin Nichols	November 29, 2010	214B
Bessie and Happy go back to the time of the dinosaurs when she, Penny, and Happy find a dinosaur bone and Bessie accidentally insults them, which results in her getting chased by them when she accidentally teleports them back to her time.
32a	12a	"The Bone Identity"	Erik Wiese & Eddie Trigueros	Jessica Gao, Brendan Hay & Cynthia True	Justin Nichols	November 30, 2010	215A
Happy receives a mysterious note, regarding the missing half of his right ear.
32b	12b	"Grumpy Old Bees"	Erik Wiese & Bill Wray	Brendan Hay	Sunil Hall	November 30, 2010	215B
Bessie befriends an elderly ex-bee who then becomes obsessed with taking her sock hop badge, because she didn't earn one as a kid.
33a	13a	"Children of the Unicorn"	Erik Wiese & Bill Wray	Brendan Hay	Justin Nichols	December 1, 2010	217A
Bessie and Gwen set out to prove that unicorns really exist.
33b	13b	"My Way or the Bee Way"	Erik Wiese & Eddie Trigueros	Brendan Hay	Ed Baker	December 1, 2010	217B
Bessie adopts a weed-strewn stretch of highway and makes it a popular road, but later, Portia makes her own and it becomes a competition to see who can get the most customers.
34 35	14 15	"O Brother, What Art Thou" Stuffed Happens"	Erik Wiese & Eddie Trigueros Erik Wiese, Eddie Trigueros & Bill Wray	Brendan Hay Jessica Gao, Brendan Hay & Cynthia True	Katie Rice, Kirk Hanson & Frank Molieri Justin Nichols, Sunil Hall & Chris Reccardi	December 2, 2010	210 211
When Ben mistakenly thinks that Bessie is making Happy her sidekick, he decides to become her nemesis. After resolving their issues, they have to team up to stop Mr. Pants, who frames Bessie by messing with the Honeybees' precious items, causing Bessie to get suspended from the Honeybee activities.
36	16	"Gorillas in the Midst"	Erik Wiese & Bill Wray	Brendan Hay & Jessica Gao, Cynthia True	Sunil Hall, Howie Perry, Eddie Trigueros & Dave Thomas	May 15, 2011	212
Bessie poses as a gorilla scout and Ben poses as Bessie as a Honeybee, but Ben gets too swept up in his role.
37a	17a	"Space Evaders"	Erik Wiese & Bill Wray	Jessica Gao, Brendan Hay & Cynthia True	Howie Perry & Eddie Trigueros	May 22, 2011	216A
Happy launches himself and Bessie into outer space, to avoid getting a flea dip.
37b	17b	"YiPs"	Erik Wiese & Bill Wray	Jessica Gao	Miles Thompson, Aaron Paetz & Eddie Trigueros	May 22, 2011	216B
Bessie and Happy go on a police ride-along to get the Junior Policeman badge.
38a	18a	"Public Enembee"	Erik Wiese & Eddie Trigueros	Jessica Gao, Brendan Hay & Cynthia True	Matt Whitlock & Eddie Trigueros	May 29, 2011	218A
Bessie accidentally trips the fire alarm during Fire Safety Week.
38b	18b	"Bang the Drum Timely"	Erik Wiese & Eddie Trigueros	Jessica Gao	Howie Perry & Sunil Hall	May 29, 2011	218B
Bessie must write jokes in order to earn her Stand-up Comedy badge but keeps failing, so she gets Hippie to help her with sound effects, though this quickly annoys her.
39a	19a	"The League of Ordinary Gentlemen"	Erik Wiese & Eddie Trigueros	Jessica Gao, Brendan Hay & Cynthia True	Sunil Hall	June 5, 2011	219A
Happy, Hippie and Ben form a Gentlemen's club, and Bessie wants to join.
39b	19b	"Irritable Bowling Syndrome"	Erik Wiese & Bill Wray	Story by : Kristine Songco; Written by : Jessica Gao & Brendan Hay	Chris Reccardi & Justin Nichols	June 5, 2011	219B
Bessie is haunted by her inability to get a strike, while bowling.
40a	20a	"Bess-E"	Erik Wiese & Eddie Trigueros	Brendan Hay	Chris Reccardi & Eddie Trigueros	June 12, 2011	220A
After Gwen & Portia tease Bessie's analytical nature, Bessie starts to believe herself that she is a robot.
40b	20b	"C'mon Get Happy!"	Erik Wiese & Bill Wray	Jessica Gao, Brendan Hay & Cynthia True	Howie Perry	June 12, 2011	220B
Bessie and Happy plan to celebrate their 104-week anniversary of becoming best friends.
