= Bar Mitzvah (disambiguation) =

Bar mitzvah (Hebrew: בַּר מִצְוָה) is a Jewish coming of age ritual for boys.

Bar Mitzvah can also refer to:

- Bar mitzvah attack, an attack on the SSL/TLS protocols that exploits the use of the RC4 cipher with weak keys for that cipher
- Bar Mitzvah Boy, British television play on the BBC based on a script by Jack Rosenthal
  - Bar Mitzvah Boy (musical), a musical based on above

== See also ==
- Bat Mitzvah (disambiguation)
- The Black Bar Mitzvah, 2012 mixtape by American rapper Rick Ross
- Ruin Jonny's Bar Mitzvah, 2004 live album by Me First and the Gimme Gimmes
- Adult bar mitzvah, a bar mitzvah of a person older than the customary age
- Bars Mitzvah, 2023 studio album by American rapper BLP Kosher
