= Albert S. Axelrad =

American rabbi (1938–2026)

- Born: October 22, 1938; New York City, U.S.
- Died: September 18, 2026 (aged 87); Massachusetts, U.S.
- Education: Columbia University; Hebrew Union College – Jewish Institute of Religion
- Known for: Rabbi of Hillel at Brandeis University
- Spouse: Berta

Albert S. Axelrad (October 22, 1938 – September 18, 2026) was an American Reform rabbi, author, educator and community leader. He fostered the American Jewish counterculture of the 1960s-1980s. Axelrad also served as Jewish chaplain at Brandeis University and Executive Director of its B'nai B'rith Hillel Foundation from 1965 to 1999.

== Early life and career ==
Albert Sidney Axelrad was born in Brooklyn, New York City, on October 22, 1938. He attended the Yeshivah of Flatbush and then earned a BA in sociology at Columbia University. He received an MA and, in 1965, rabbinic ordination from Hebrew Union College–Jewish Institute of Religion in New York.

As Hillel director at Brandeis, Axelrad pioneered a number of programs that were adopted widely in American Jewish life, leading one student to dub him a "Jewish impresario." The annual Jewish Arts Festival introduced there became a part of Hillel programming around North America. Under Axelrad's leadership, the Berlin Chapel, the Jewish chapel at Brandeis, for several years housed the office of the young Jewish counterculture's quarterly magazine Response: A Contemporary Jewish Review, which had been founded by Jewish students in New York in 1967. His commitment to pluralism in Jewish communal life earned him widespread respect, even among groups for whom his religious and political views were anathema. One official of the central Hillel Foundation organization described Axelrad in the 1980s as "not a Hillel director; the Hillel director."

Axelrad was one of the founders in 1968 of Havurat Shalom in Somerville, Massachusetts, which was originally envisioned as a "community seminary" to offer a new model of rabbinic training. The Brandeis student "egalitarian minyan" prayer groups, with Axelrad's active involvement, were among the earliest spinoffs of the new approach to Jewish prayer developed by Havurat Shalom.

When Axelrad understood that many adult members of the university community, especially women, had not celebrated their bar/bat mitzvah decades earlier, Axelrad arranged for the first "adult bar and bat mitzvah" training and celebrations in the early 1970s. He and his students and friends helped popularize the practice in all denominations of North American Judaism.

Beginning in the first years of his rabbinate, Axelrad advocated for rabbinic officiation at marriages of a Jew and a non-Jew, although only under limited circumstances. Noting that supportive non-Jewish spouses could be involved in raising Jewish children, he proposed that rabbis should be understanding of a non-Jewish partner's reluctance to convert to Judaism for any of a variety of reasons. For couples willing to raise Jewish children, Axelrad proposed that the cooperation and support of a rabbi at the outset of the marriage could be crucial in their decision to do so.

== Advocacy and other interests ==
Arriving at Brandeis as American involvement in the Vietnam War reached its peak, Axelrad became involved in advising students considering seeking conscientious objector status in the Selective Service military draft system. He was an active member of the Jewish Peace Fellowship. Axelrad came to describe himself not as a "pacifist" but as a "pacifoid," doing everything possible to avoid war, but also recognizing that in extreme cases war may be necessary.

Another area of Axelrad's political advocacy was in the movement for divestment from South Africa as a way of pressuring the government there to abandon apartheid. He remained troubled by the anti-Israel bias of many who shared his divestment position.

From 1973 through 1977, Breira, the first national Jewish organization to advocate for the establishment of an independent Palestinian state alongside Israel, counted Axelrad among its leaders. Rael Jean Isaac's pamphlet, Breira: Counsel for Judaism, published in 1977, attacked Breira’s conciliatory positions on the disputed territories controlled by Israel, citing some of Axelrad’s publications and taking issue with both their substance and their motivation.

The most severe and widely publicized denunciation of Axelrad’s positions on Jewish issues came when he was one of hundreds of Jews excommunicated in a formal ceremony performed in 1982 by a self-appointed “Supreme Rabbinical Court of America” led by another Massachusetts rabbi, Martin Antelman.

In the 1970s and 1980s, Axelrad was involved in the plight of Jews in the Soviet Union, who were unable to practice Judaism and also unable to emigrate. He made Brandeis University a center of activity in the Soviet Jewry Movement of those years. His 1978 trip to the Soviet Union, the first of two such journeys to visit refuseniks, is documented in a brief book he wrote, Refusenik: Voices of Struggle and Hope. He visited again, with a rabbinic colleague from Boston, in February, 1991.

Axelrad's interest in nonviolent resistance to tyranny led him to focus on the biblical midwives of the Hebrew women of Egypt, Shifra and Puah. He publicized one of two visits to Brandeis by Avital Sharansky during her efforts to free her husband Anatoly Shcharansky (later Natan Sharansky) from imprisonment in the Soviet Union led Axelrad to create the Shifra and Puah Award, presented annually by Brandeis Hillel.

After his retirement from Brandeis, Axelrad served as the founding director of the Center for Spiritual Life and adjunct professor of religion at Emerson College in Boston, and as a part-time chaplain at the Massachusetts Eye and Ear, a specialty hospital in Boston.

== Personal life and death ==
Axelrad died on September 18, 2026, at the age of 87. His wife Berta died in December 2024. They lived in Massachusetts with their children.
