= Carole B. Balin =

American rabbi (born 1964)

- Born: Carole Beth Balin; 1964 (age 61–62); Andover, Massachusetts
- Education: B.A. history, Wellesley College, 1986; M.A. Hebrew letters, Hebrew Union College-Jewish Institute of Religion, 1989; M. Phil., Columbia University, 1994; PhD, history, Columbia University, 1998
- Occupation: Professor of Jewish history
- Years active: 1997–present
- Employer: Hebrew Union College-Jewish Institute of Religion
- Notable work: To Reveal Our Hearts: Jewish Women Writers in Tsarist Russia (2003)
- Spouse: Michael E. Gertzman
- Children: 3

Carole Beth Balin (born 1964) is a Reform rabbi and professor of Jewish history at Hebrew Union College-Jewish Institute of Religion in New York City. Her research interests include Eastern European and American Jewish history, the history of Reform Judaism, and gender studies. She received laudatory reviews for her 2003 book To Reveal Our Hearts: Jewish Women Writers in Tsarist Russia, and has co-edited two other books. She is a co-curator of "Bat Mitzvah Comes of Age", a traveling exhibition sponsored by the Smithsonian-affiliated National Museum of American Jewish History and the Moving Traditions Jewish non-profit.

== Early life and education ==
Carole Beth Balin grew up in Andover, Massachusetts, the daughter of Theodore G. Balin, a defense engineer, and Marcia Balin, a telemarketing sales trainer. She became bat mitzvah in 1977; her mother celebrated her own bat mitzvah in 1979.

She earned her bachelor's degree in history at Wellesley College in 1986. Her senior honors thesis was "Unraveling an American-Jewish Synthesis: Rosa Sonneschein's The American Jewess, 1895–1899". In 1989 she earned a master's degree in Hebrew letters at Hebrew Union College-Jewish Institute of Religion, followed by rabbinic ordination in 1991 at the same institute. In 1994 she earned a Master of Philosophy degree at Columbia University, and in 1998 completed her PhD in history at Columbia. Her doctoral advisors were Yosef Hayim Yerushalmi and Michael Stanislawski.

== Academic career ==
Balin was a visiting instructor at the Institute for Advanced Jewish Studies in Moscow in 1995. She joined the faculty of her alma mater, the Hebrew Union College, in 1997 as assistant professor of Jewish history, advancing to associate professor in 2004 and full professor in 2006. She was also a faculty member of the Wexner Heritage Foundation from 1999 to 2003.

== Works ==
Balin's 2003 book To Reveal Our Hearts: Jewish Women Writers in Tsarist Russia was noted for its "pioneering" research by several reviewers, as she rediscovered the existence of 67 Jewish women writers (44 Russian-language, 17 Hebrew-language, and six Yiddish-language) in the Russian Empire in the late 19th and early 20th centuries through archival material in Russia, Israel, and North America. The book explores in-depth the lives of five of these writers.

Balin has written numerous book chapters and articles, including several biographies for the Jewish Women's Archive. She wrote the pieces "Betty Friedan’s 'Spiritual Daughters,' the ERA, and the CCAR" and "From Periphery to Center: A History of the Women's Rabbinic Network", which appear in the book The Sacred Calling: Four Decades of Women in the Rabbinate, published in 2016. She also blogs for The Huffington Post.

== Other activities ==
In 1991 Balin became the spiritual leader of the Jewish Congregation of Kinnelon, New Jersey, which conducts joint worship services at St. David's, an Episcopal church. Her duties for the 300-member Reform congregation included officiating at religious services, planning seminars on religion, preparing youth for their bar mitzvah or bat mitzvah, and visiting hospitalized and homebound Jewish patients.

In 2008 she was one of the interviewees on the PBS documentary The Jewish People: A Story of Survival.

Balin is the co-curator, with Josh Perelman and Lori Perlow, of the traveling exhibition "Bat Mitzvah Comes of Age", which opened in April 2012 at the Jewish Community Center of Manhattan. The exhibition, a collaboration between the Smithsonian-affiliated National Museum of American Jewish History and the Moving Traditions Jewish non-profit, traces the history of bat mitzvahs in the United States through the stories of 150 American women, depicted in images and oral histories. It has since visited eight other locales.

She is a member of the board of Moving Traditions.

== Personal life ==
Balin married Michael Eric Gertzman, a Harvard law student, in August 1988. From 1992 to 1996 Gertzman served as Assistant United States Attorney for the Southern District of New York. He is currently a partner at Paul, Weiss, Rifkind, Wharton & Garrison in New York City. They have three children.

== Bibliography ==
=== Books ===
- 'To Tread on New Ground': Selected Hebrew Writings of Hava Shapiro. Wayne State University Press. 2014. ISBN 978-0814338704. (co-edited with Wendy I. Zierler)
- Sisterhood: A Centennial History of Women of Reform Judaism. Hebrew Union College Press. 2013. ISBN 978-0878202546. (co-edited with Dana Herman and Jonathan D. Sarna)
- To Reveal Our Hearts: Jewish Women Writers in Tsarist Russia. Hebrew Union College Press. 2003. ISBN 978-0878204564.

=== Selected chapters ===
- Balin, Carole B. (2012). "Preface". In Cosgrove, Elliot J.; Wolpe, David J. (eds.). Jewish Theology in Our Time: A New Generation Explores the Foundations and Future of Jewish Belief. Jewish Lights Publishing. ISBN 978-1580236300.
- Balin, Carole B. (2011). "Making Every Forkful Count: Reform Jews, Kashrut, and Mindful Eating, 1840–2010". In Zamore, Mary L. (ed.). The Sacred Table: Creating a Jewish Food Ethic. CCAR Press. pp. 50–59. ISBN 978-0881231861.
- Balin, Carole B. (2008). "Moving Through the Movements: American denominations and their Haggadot". In Arnow, David (ed.). My People's Passover Haggadah: Traditional texts, modern commentaries. Vol. 1. Jewish Lights Publishing. pp. 79–84. ISBN 978-1580233545.
- Balin, Carole B. (2008). "'Good to the Last Drop': The proliferation of the Maxwell House Haggadah". In Arnow, David (ed.). My People's Passover Haggadah: Traditional texts, modern commentaries. Vol. 1. Jewish Lights Publishing. pp. 85–90. ISBN 978-1580233545.

=== Selected articles ===
- "Leaning In to the Presidency: Hillary, Sheryl and Me". The Huffington Post. 11 June 2014.
- "The Uniongram and the Cookie". Women of Reform Judaism. 10 September 2013. Archived from the original on 1 May 2016.
- "Bat Mitzvah Comes of Age: 90 Years of Transforming Jewish Girls to Women". The Huffington Post. 12 March 2012.
