= Women's Rabbinic Network =

American organization for female Reform rabbis

Women's Rabbinic Network is, according to itself, “the organization of Reform female, nonbinary, genderfluid rabbis, supporting and advocating for our members and the values we uphold to positively impact women in the Jewish community.”

Ellen Weinberg Dreyfus, a founder and former president of the Women's Rabbinic Network, was selected as one of the top 50 rabbis in America by Newsweek and the Sisterhood blog of The Jewish Daily Forward.

In 2012 Rabbi Mary L. Zamore, then the executive director of the Women's Rabbinic Network, wrote to Rabbi David Ellenson, the Hebrew Union College-Jewish Institute of Religion’s then president, requesting that he address the discrepancy of male candidates' ordination certificates identifying them by the Reform movement’s traditional "morenu harav," or "our teacher the rabbi," while female candidates' certificates only used the term "rav u’morah," or "rabbi and teacher." After four years of deliberation, HUC-JIR decided to give women a choice of wording on their ordination certificates beginning in 2016, including the option to have the same wording as men.

The piece "From Periphery to Center: A History of the Women's Rabbinic Network", by Rabbi Carole B. Balin, appears in the book The Sacred Calling: Four Decades of Women in the Rabbinate, published in 2016.

In August 2022, Rabbi Elaine Rose Glickman was named assistant executive director of the organization.

== See also ==
- Women rabbis
- Rabbinic authority
