= Daniel Brenner =

American rabbi

Daniel S. Brenner is an American rabbi. Brenner is Vice President of Education at Moving Traditions. Brenner was the founding executive director of Birthright Israel NEXT and he directed graduate-level training programs at Auburn Theological Seminary and at CLAL- the National Jewish Center for Learning and Leadership, both in New York City. In 2009, he was named by Newsweek Magazine as one of the fifty most influential rabbis in America.

Brenner graduated with a BA in philosophy from the University of Wisconsin, studied in Jerusalem at the Pardes Institute of Jewish Studies, and received both an MA and rabbinic title from the Reconstructionist Rabbinical College.

After ordination, Brenner studied with Rabbi Irving Greenberg at CLAL-the National Jewish Center for Learning and Leadership as part of the Steinhardt Fellowship. Brenner served on the faculty of CLAL from 1998–2003, authoring a work on palliative care with Joseph Fins, the chief of medical ethics of Weill Cornell Medical College and a series on spirituality with Rabbi Zalman Schachter-Shalomi.

In 2003, Brenner became the first rabbi to direct the Center for Multifaith Education at Auburn Theological Seminary, a Presbyterian seminary in Manhattan. At Auburn, Brenner played a role in the creation of a doctoral program at New York Theological Seminary for clergy who work within a religiously diverse context. It is the first doctoral level program of its kind in the United States. Brenner also created a program with Columbia University's Center for the Study of Science and Religion for religious leaders. He received a Simon Rockower Award for Excellence in Jewish Journalism in 2004 for the article Talking with Presbyterians about Israel he wrote for New Jersey Jewish News.

Brenner became the vice president of the Birthright Israel Foundation in 2007. He then founded and became executive director of Birthright Israel NEXT, an organization with the mission of engaging young adults in Jewish community life. Under Brenner's leadership, Birthright Israel NEXT launched NEXT Shabbat and grew into a national organization that involved over 50,000 young Jewish adults each year.

Brenner joined Moving Traditions in 2011. Brenner is a published playwright. In 2012, he served as the official rabbi for The Wall Street Journal's Passover wine tasting. In 2016 he started a dance craze called "Klezmer Aerobics".

== Works ==
- Fins, Joseph J.; Brenner, Daniel S. (2005). Embracing Life & Facing Death: A Jewish Guide to Palliative Care. CLAL. ISBN 978-0963332905.
- Brenner, Daniel S. (2009). "Please Don't Feed the Prophet". In Sharlet, Jeff; Manseau, Peter (eds.). Believer Beware - First Person Dispatches from the Margins of Faith. Beacon Press. pp. 98–102. ISBN 978-0-8070-7739-9.
- Brenner, Daniel (February 1, 2012). "Will Men Stand up Against the Sex Slave Trade in Israel?". The Huffington Post.
- Brenner, Daniel (March 5, 2012). "Every Sperm is Sacred? Jewish Perspectives on Contraception". The Huffington Post.
- Brenner, Daniel (May 12, 2011). "Rabbi Daniel Brenner on the Initiative to Ban Circumcision". The Jerusalem Post. Archived from the original on 2011-10-14.
- Brenner, Daniel S. (September 1, 2011). "Ultimate Frisbee and the Next Generation of Jewish Men". Jewish Telegraphic Agency.
- "Boys to Men: A Thanksgiving Lesson via Esau". New Jersey Jewish News. November 17, 2011.
- Brenner, Daniel (January 19, 2015). "Baboons, Bonobos, and Bar Mitzvah Boys, ELI Talks". www.sefaria.org.
