= Snoopy Presents: A Summer Musical =

2025 Peanuts animated special

- Genre: Musical; Children & Family; Comedy
- Based on: Peanuts by Charles M. Schulz
- Written by: Craig Schulz; Bryan Schulz; Cornelius Uliano
- Directed by: Erik Wiese
- Starring: Etienne Kellici; Hattie Kragten; Terry McGurrin
- Music by: Jeff Morrow; Alan Zachary; Michael Weiner; Ben Folds
- Countries of origin: Canada United States
- Original language: English

Production
- Executive producers: Craig Schulz; Bryan Schulz; Cornelius Uliano; Paige Braddock; Josh Scherba; Stephanie Betts; Logan McPherson
- Running time: 41 minutes
- Production companies: Peanuts Worldwide; WildBrain Studios; Schulz Studio

Original release
- Network: Apple TV+
- Release: August 15, 2025

Related
- Snoopy Presents: Welcome Home, Franklin (2024); Snoopy Presents: There's No Place Like Home, Snoopy (2026)

Snoopy Presents: A Summer Musical, or simply A Summer Musical, is a 2025 musical animated special based on the Peanuts comic strip by Charles M. Schulz. It is the 52nd Peanuts special overall and was the seventh to be released exclusively on Apple TV+, on August 15, 2025. Directed by Erik Wiese from a screenplay by Cornelius Uliano and Craig and Bryan Schulz, it features the voices of Etienne Kellici as Charlie Brown, Jayd Deroché as Charlie Brown's singing voice, and Hattie Kragten as Charlie Brown's younger sister Sally. The plot follows Charlie Brown and Sally as they are sent to summer camp alongside the rest of the Peanuts cast. Charlie Brown tries to reassure his reluctant first-time camper sister that camp will be fun, learning about the location's past and future, while Snoopy (Terry McGurrin) and Woodstock (Rob Tinkler) search for hidden treasure on the campgrounds.

== Plot ==
Charlie Brown eagerly rides a bus to the Cloverhill Ranch summer camp with his reluctant younger sister, Sally Brown, alongside the rest of the Peanuts gang ("Best Time Ever"). As a returning senior camper, he promises her an idyllic first experience filled with nature and fun. Sally, however, feels uneasy as she settles in with her bunkmates. The two visit the "history wall", a gallery of photographs of past campers, where they notice the number of attendees dwindling over the years, also noticing several missing frames. When Charlie Brown accidentally knocks one down, Snoopy discovers a hidden treasure map and embarks on an adventure to find the treasure it leads to.

Sally suffers a restless night and wakes to discover her shirt has been tie-dyed as part of a prank, pushing her to a breaking point where she proclaims that camp is dirty, dangerous, and exhausting ("A Place Like This"). Her mood switches when she discovers a petting zoo and bonds with a pony named Lula May, along with her bunkmates. Meanwhile, rumors spread that Cloverhill Ranch will close due to declining attendance and a trail shutdown caused by nearby urban development. This news upsets Charlie Brown and unsettles the campers.

Meanwhile, Snoopy and Woodstock set off in search of the treasure. After Snoopy briefly loses the map, Woodstock retrieves it and helps locate the treasure at the bottom of a river. They recover a chest but are dismayed to find it locked.

Back at camp, Charlie Brown reflects on early memories of Cloverhill Ranch as the campers gradually comes to terms with the possibility of closure ("When We Were Light"). Meanwhile, Sally and her friends are found to be creating memories of their own through games, campfires, and stargazing. The next morning, Snoopy returns with the chest and forces its lock open, revealing a time capsule filled with instruments and photos of past campers, including one of a concert.

Inspired, Charlie Brown proposes hosting a festival to save the camp, even though it is his final year. The campers send invitations and prepare a stage; at the same time, Snoopy writes to his siblings. On the morning of the event, heavy rain threatens to ruin everything. Charlie Brown is discouraged; he is told to look up to the clouds and accept that no one will show up. As he reflects on his lost hope, the rain clears and a large crowd arrives ("Look Up, Charlie Brown").

After everyone has arrived, Snoopy's siblings appear to play the instruments discovered in the time capsule and the festival succeeds, helping secure the camp's future. During the celebration, Charlie Brown reflects on the importance of preserving heritage for future generations ("Leave It Better"). A flashback reveals that he and Sally restored the missing photos on the history wall using the time capsule, showing how Sally herself has come to value the camp's legacy. The campers head home, and the final frame shows a new addition to the memory wall: Charlie Brown, Sally, and the rest together in celebration.

== Cast ==
The special's voice cast includes:

- Etienne Kellici as Charlie Brown
  - Jayd Deroché as Charlie Brown's singing voice
- Hattie Kragten as Sally Brown
- Terry McGurrin as Snoopy
- Rob Tinkler as Woodstock
- Zoe Wheatley as Eudora
- Isabella Leo as Lucy Van Pelt
- Wyatt White as Linus Van Pelt
- Lexi Perri as Peppermint Patty
- Arianna McDonald as Marcie
- Caleb Bellavance as Franklin

== Production and music ==
A Summer Musical was announced on May 20, 2025 with a planned release date of July 18. A trailer was released on July 30, and the special premiered on Apple TV+ on August 15, 2025.

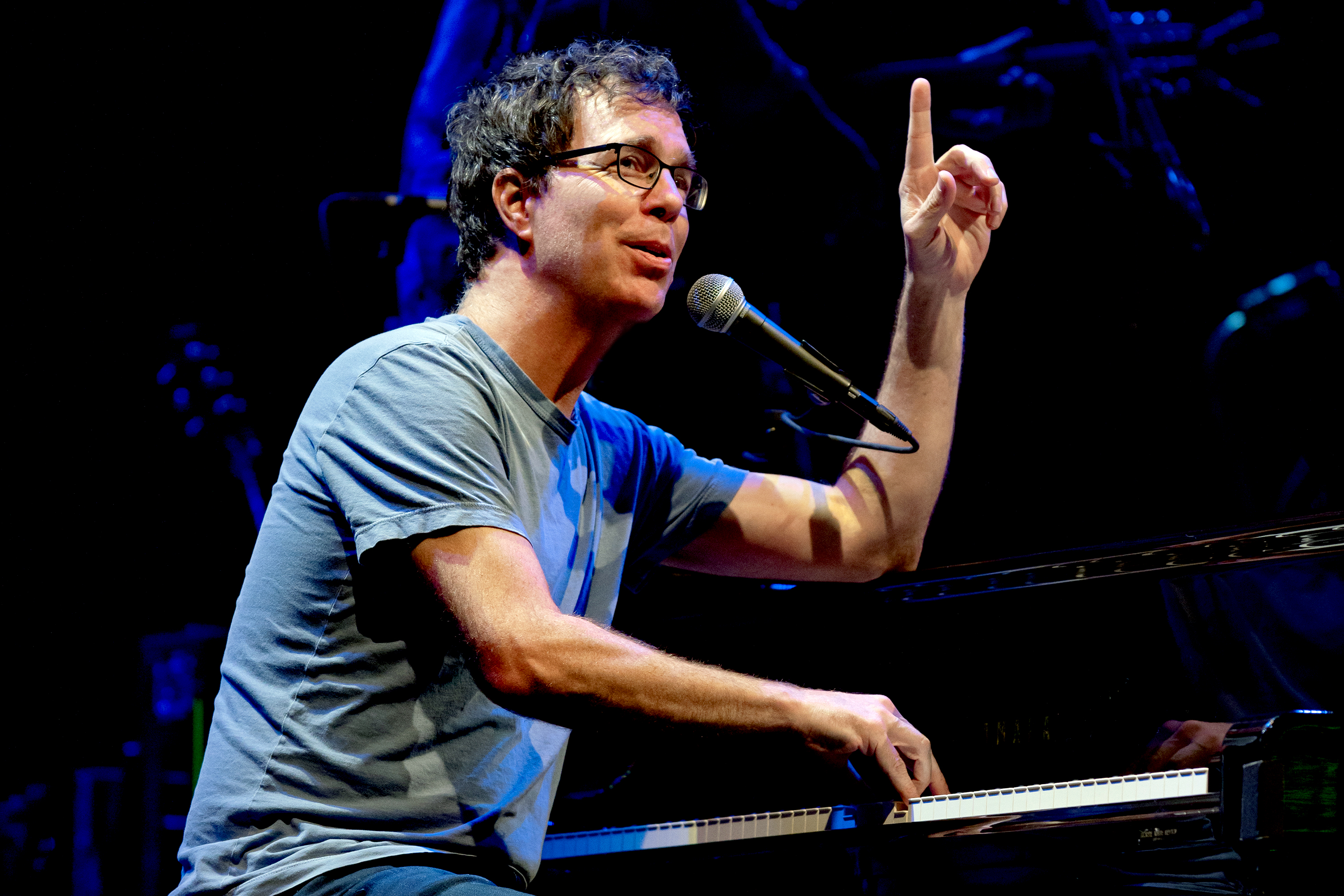
Co-composer Ben Folds in 2023

Songwriter Jeff Morrow composed the first two lyrical songs in the special in collaboration with Alan Zachary and Michael Weiner, while Ben Folds wrote the remaining three. Folds had previously been commissioned to work on It's The Small Things, Charlie Brown. Morrow's songs—"Best Time Ever" and "A Place Like This"—exhibit an upbeat pop jazz style inspired by both Vince Guaraldi's work in previous Peanuts specials and Folds's songwriting; director Erik Wiese explained that "we wanted it to sound cohesive." In contrast, Folds's songs are heavier and at times melancholic to reflect the more serious tone of the latter half of the special. "When We Were Light" and "Look Up, Charlie Brown" are ballads, while "Leave It Better" is "up-tempo" and "cheerful", a style Folds found difficult to write in. Morrow composed and enlisted a 75-piece orchestra to perform the grandiose background music heard throughout Snoopy's subplot.

During "When We Were Light", the special uses an art style resembling 1950s Peanuts strips. Co-producer Craig Schulz was initially hesitant to include this sequence, which was conceived by his son Bryan partly in response to the younger characters seen in Snoopy Presents: One-of-a-Kind Marcie. Charles M. Schulz, Craig's father, disliked his early cartooning style during his lifetime; as a result, no Peanuts special to date had incorporated it. However, Craig enjoyed the sequence once it was complete, stating that it was "[his] favorite scene in the whole film."

=== Soundtrack ===
A soundtrack album for the special was released on major streaming platforms on August 15, 2025.

Snoopy Presents: A Summer Musical (Apple TV+ Original Soundtrack)

Soundtrack album
- Released: August 15, 2025
- Genre: Soundtrack
- Length: 20:00

| No. | Title | Writer(s) | Artist(s) | Length |
|---|---|---|---|---|
| 1. | "Best Time Ever" | Jeff Morrow, Alan Zachary, Michael Weiner | Jayd, Hattie Kragten, Peanuts | 3:22 |
| 2. | "A Place Like This" | Morrow, Zachary, Weiner | Kragten | 1:35 |
| 3. | "When We Were Light" | Ben Folds | Jayd, Kragten, Peanuts | 3:48 |
| 4. | "Look Up, Charlie Brown" | Folds | Jayd, Peanuts | 3:42 |
| 5. | "Leave It Better" | Folds | Jayd, Peanuts | 3:33 |
| 6. | "When We Were Light (Ben Folds Version)" | | Folds | 3:38 |
| 7. | "Look Up, Charlie Brown (Ben Folds Version)" | | Folds | 3:32 |
| 8. | "Leave It Better (Ben Folds Version)" | | Folds | 3:33 |
| 9. | "First Camp" | | Jeff Morrow | 0:28 |
| 10. | "Camp Critters" | | Morrow | 0:43 |
| 11. | "Camp Struggles" | | Morrow | 1:28 |
| 12. | "Lake Snake" | | Morrow | 0:17 |
| 13. | "History Wall" | | Morrow | 1:12 |
| 14. | "Lulu May" | | Morrow | 1:19 |
| 15. | "Closing Camp" | | Morrow | 2:20 |
| 16. | "Closed Forever" | | Morrow | 1:06 |
| 17. | "X Marks the Spot" | | Morrow | 2:10 |
| 18. | "Joseph Cool" | | Morrow | 0:20 |
| 19. | "Unlocking Treasure" | | Morrow | 0:24 |
| 20. | "Festival" | | Morrow | 0:30 |
| 21. | "Make a Plan" | | Morrow | 0:40 |
| 22. | "Credits" | | Morrow | 1:34 |

== Reception ==
=== Critical response ===
On the review aggregator website Rotten Tomatoes, 78% of 9 critics' reviews are positive. Preston Barta wrote in Denton Record-Chronicle that the musical is "a reminder of the values that connect us" and "teaches children the value of empathy over judgment". John Edward Betancourt wrote in Nerds that Geek that the songs "get you tapping your toes" due to being "sung beautifully" and that they "truly work within the framework of the story" and "never feel rushed" and "shoehorned in". Bill Goodykoontz of The Arizona Republic called it "delightful", praising the songs but criticizing the story as "light" compared to A Charlie Brown Christmas. G. Allen Johnson of the San Francisco Chronicle praised the animation as "colorful and meditative, with several nice touches", citing for example a scene where Charlie Brown is walking down some sunny trees.

However, the special received some negative reception. Jesse Hassenger of The Daily Beast panned the special, saying "It's not all that funny. For long stretches, it barely even tries to be funny." J. Kelly Nestruck of The Globe and Mail similarly said the special is "worth watching only for those (like me) fond of Folds, and proud of him for taking a stand and quitting his job at the Kennedy Center for the Performing Arts after it was taken over by President Donald Trump," criticizing the music as "poorly integrated into a script that feels only sketched in".

=== Accolades ===
| Award | Date of ceremony | Category | Recipient(s) | Result | Ref(s). |
|---|---|---|---|---|---|
| Annie Awards | February 21, 2026 | Best Animated Special Production | Snoopy Presents: A Summer Musical | Won | |
| Annie Awards | February 21, 2026 | Outstanding Achievement for Character Animation in an Animated Television / Broadcast Production | Chris Derochie | Nominated | |
| Annie Awards | February 21, 2026 | Outstanding Achievement for Music in an Animated Television / Broadcast Production | Ben Folds, Jeff Morrow, Alan Zachary, Michael Weiner | Nominated | |
| Astra Creative Arts Awards | December 11, 2025 | Best Original Song | "Best Time Ever" | Nominated | |
| Canadian Screen Awards | May 31, 2026 | Best Animated Program or Series | Snoopy Presents: A Summer Musical | Nominated | |
| Canadian Screen Awards | May 31, 2026 | Best Original Music, Animation | Jeff Morrow | Nominated | |
| Canadian Screen Awards | May 31, 2026 | Best Original Song | Jeff Morrow (for "A Place Like This") | Nominated | |
| Hollywood Music in Media Awards | November 19, 2025 | Original Song – Animated Film | Alan Zachary, Michael Weiner and Jeff Morrow (writers); cast (performers) (for "Best Time Ever") | Nominated | |
| Leo Awards | July 5, 2026 | Best Animation Program | Logan Mcpherson, James Brown, Craig Schulz, Bryan Schulz, Cornelius Uliano, Paige Braddock and Josh Scherba | Nominated | |
| Leo Awards | July 5, 2026 | Best Direction, Animation Program | Erik Wiese and Kaitlin Sutherland | Won | |
| Leo Awards | July 5, 2026 | Best Sound, Animation Program | Gregorio Gomez, Greg Stewart, Angelo Nicoloyannis, John Franco, Bonnie Lambie, Rick Senechal and Alex Krivoi | Nominated | |
| Leo Awards | July 5, 2026 | Best Character Animation, Animation Program | Chris Derochie | Nominated | |
| Producers Guild of America Awards | February 28, 2026 | Outstanding Children's Program | Snoopy Presents: A Summer Musical | Nominated | |
| TCA Awards | August 20, 2026 | Outstanding Achievement in Children's Programming | Snoopy Presents: A Summer Musical | Won | |
