= Ellen Weinberg Dreyfus =

American rabbi

Ellen Weinberg Dreyfus is an American rabbi. She is a founder and former president of the Women's Rabbinic Network.

== Career ==
She was ordained in 1979 at the Hebrew Union College-Jewish Institute of Religion (HUC-JIR) in New York, and is to her knowledge the first woman to be ordained as a rabbi while pregnant.

In 1983, she moved back to Illinois, becoming the first female rabbi in that state.

In 2001, she became the first female president of the Chicago Board of Rabbis.

In 2009, she was installed as the second female president of Reform Judaism's Central Conference of American Rabbis (CCAR) in Jerusalem, making her the first female leader of a major rabbinic organization to begin her tenure in Israel.

Also in 2009, she was also inducted onto the Board of Governors of the Hebrew Union College-Jewish Institute of Religion.

The piece "From Generation to Generation: A Roundtable Discussion with Rabbi Ellen Weinberg Dreyfus", appears in the book The Sacred Calling: Four Decades of Women in the Rabbinate, published in 2016.

== Honors ==
In 2004, the Hebrew Union College-Jewish Institute of Religion awarded her an honorary Doctor of Divinity degree.

In 2010, she was selected as one of the top 50 rabbis in America by Newsweek and the Sisterhood blog of The Jewish Daily Forward.

In 2011, she received the Rabbi Mordecai Simon Memorial Award.

== Personal life ==
She is married and has three children.
