= Big Fan (game show) =

- Genre: Game show
- Created by: Jimmy Kimmel
- Presented by: Andy Richter
- Country of origin: United States
- Original language: English
- No. of seasons: 1
- No. of episodes: 4

Production
- Executive producers: Jimmy Kimmel; David Goldberg; Caroline Baumgard; Jeff Krask; Michael Canter
- Running time: 30 minutes
- Production companies: Smo King Baby; Banijay Studios North America

Original release
- Network: ABC
- Release: January 9 – January 16, 2017

Related
- Jimmy Kimmel Live!

Big Fan is an American short-lived game show that debuted on ABC. The series premiered on January 9, 2017.

== Details ==
The US TV network ABC announced Big Fan in February 2016. The series is based on a segment on Jimmy Kimmel Live! called Who Knows...?, in which a contestant competes against a celebrity or sports figure of whom he or she is a fan, answering trivia and biographical questions about the star.

The half-hour series is hosted by Andy Richter, with Jimmy Kimmel, David Goldberg, and Caroline Baumgard as executive producers, and Banijay Studios North America producing.

== Episodes ==
No.	Title	Original release date
1	"Matthew McConaughey"	January 9, 2017
2	"Aaron Rodgers"	January 9, 2017
3	"Kim Kardashian West"	January 16, 2017
4	"Kristen Bell"	January 16, 2017
