= List of The Mighty B! episodes =

The Mighty B! is an American animated television series created by Amy Poehler, Cynthia True, and Erik Wiese for Nickelodeon. The series centers on Bessie Higgenbottom, an ambitious Honeybee scout that believes she will become a superhero called the Mighty B if she collects every Honeybee badge. Bessie lives in San Francisco with her single mother Hilary, brother Ben, and dog Happy. The series was picked up for a pilot in early 2006 under the name of Super Scout. The series premiered on April 26, 2008, which was the morning after Poehler's film Baby Mama had released. In September 2008, the show was renewed for a second season with 20 episodes. Brown Johnson, president of animation at Nickelodeon, called the show a "break-out hit" that "complements and strengthens" the Saturday morning line-up. The second season premiered on September 21, 2009.

The Mighty B! and its crew have been nominated six Annie Awards, with so far no wins. The show has also been nominated for two Daytime Emmy Awards, winning one for Outstanding Individual Achievement in Animation. The show has also been nominated one Artios Award and one Golden Reel Award.

Many titles of the episodes of the series are parodies of particular media. Examples include "Sleepless in San Francisco" (based on the 1993 film Sleepless in Seattle) and Dirty Happy (based on Clint Eastwood's 1971 film Dirty Harry, which even includes references quotes from the movie).

== Series overview ==
| Season | Segments | Episodes | Originally released | |
| Season | Segments | Episodes | First released | Last released |
|---|---|---|---|---|
| 1 | 39 | 20 | April 26, 2008 | June 12, 2009 |
| 2 | 35 | 20 | September 20, 2009 | June 18, 2011 |

== Episodes ==
=== Season 1 (2008–09) ===
All episodes in this season were directed by Erik Wiese & Larry Leichliter.

| No. overall | No. in season | Title | Written by | Storyboarded by | Original release date | Prod. code | Viewers (millions) |
|---|---|---|---|---|---|---|---|
| 1a | 1a | "So Happy Together" | Cynthia True & Erik Wiese | Erik Wiese | April 26, 2008 (Note: This episode originally appeared on November 13, 2007 as a sneak peek on a bonus DVD packaged with the DVD release of SpongeBob's Atlantis SquarePantis.) | 101A | 3.16 |
| 1b | 1b | "Sweet Sixteenth" | Jessica Chaffin | Chuck Klein | April 26, 2008 | 101B | 3.16 |
| 2a | 2a | "Bee My Baby" | Story by : Cynthia True & Erik Wiese; Written by : Will Berson | Chuck Klein | April 27, 2008 | 102A | N/A |
| 2b | 2b | "Bee Afraid" | Cynthia True & Erik Wiese | Erik Wiese | April 27, 2008 | 102B | N/A |
| 3a | 3a | "Artificial Unintelligence" | Dani Michaeli | Piero Piluso & Andy Suriano | May 3, 2008 | 103A | N/A |
| 3b | 3b | "We Got the Bee" | John Ross Bowie & Dannah Feinglass | Fred Gonzales | May 3, 2008 | 103B | N/A |
| 4a | 4a | "Li'l Orphan Happy" | John Bowie & Jamie Denbo | Sherm Cohen & Louie del Carmen | May 10, 2008 | 107A | 3.60 |
| 4b | 4b | "Body Rockers" | Jessica Gao | Ken Boyer & Louie del Carmen | May 10, 2008 | 107B | 3.60 |
| 5a | 5a | "Bat Mitzvah Crashers" | Jessica Chaffin | Sherm Cohen | May 17, 2008 | 104A | 3.63 |
| 5b | 5b | "Super Secret Weakness" | Dani Michaeli | Octavio Rodriguez | May 17, 2008 | 104B | 3.63 |
| 6a | 6a | "An I See Bee" | Jessica Chaffin | Ray Angrum & Piero Piluso | May 31, 2008 | 105A | 3.03 |
| 6b | 6b | "Woodward and Beesting" | Dannah Feinglass | Fred Gonzales | May 31, 2008 | 105B | 3.03 |
| 7a | 7a | "Doppelfinger" | Will Berson | Louie del Carmen | June 7, 2008 | 106A | N/A |
| 7b | 7b | "Little Womyn" | Jessica Chaffin | Fred Gonzales & Chuck Klein | June 7, 2008 | 106B | N/A |
| 8a | 8a | "The Apprentice" | Jessica Chaffin | Sherm Cohen & Fred Gonzales | June 23, 2008 | 108A | N/A |
| 8b | 8b | "Beenedict Arnold" | Jessica Gao | Ken Boyer | June 24, 2008 | 108B | N/A |
| 9a | 9a | "Boston Beean" | Jessica Gao | Octavio Rodriguez | June 25, 2008 | 109A | N/A |
| 9b | 9b | "Penny Hearts Joey" | Story by : Nicholas Cofrancesco; Written by : Dannah Feinglass | Lynne Naylor | June 26, 2008 | 109B | N/A |
| 10a | 10a | "Ten Little Honeybees" | Jessica Gao | Chuck Klein | June 27, 2008 | 110A | N/A |
| 10b | 10b | "Toot Toot" | Cynthia True & Erik Wiese | Ken Boyer, Piero Piluso & Bernie Petterson | November 29, 2008 | 110B | N/A |
| 11a | 11a | "Night Howl" | Jessica Chaffin | Eddie Trigueros & Sherm Cohen | September 9, 2008 | 113A | N/A |
| 11b | 11b | "Hat Trick" | Story by : Cynthia True & Erik Wiese; Written by : Jessica Chaffin | Ken Boyer & Fred Gonzales | September 10, 2008 | 113B | N/A |
| 12a | 12a | "Apoxalypse Now" | Jessica Gao | Chuck Klein | September 11, 2008 | 114A | N/A |
| 12b | 12b | "Hive Jacked" | Jessica Gao | Lynne Naylor | September 12, 2008 | 114B | N/A |
| 13a | 13a | "Something's Wrong With This Taffy" | Jessica Chaffin, Jessica Gao & Cynthia True | Chris Graham | October 25, 2008 | 116B | N/A |
| 13b | 13b | "Name Shame" | Jessica Gao | Eddie Trigueros | October 25, 2008 | 116A | N/A |
| 14a | 14a | "Bee Patients" | Jessica Chaffin | Eddie Trigueros & Sunil Hall | September 8, 2008 | 112A | N/A |
| 14b | 14b | "To Bee or Not to Bee" | Jessica Gao | Lynne Naylor | November 29, 2008 | 112B | N/A |
| 15a | 15a | "Eye of the Honeybee" | Jessica Chaffin | Chris Graham & Ian Graham | January 9, 2009 | 117A | N/A |
| 15b | 15b | "Thanksgiving Beenactment" | Jessica Chaffin, Jessica Gao & Cynthia True | Sunil Hall | November 29, 2008 | 117B | N/A |
| 16a | 16a | "Blindsided" | Jessica Chaffin, Jessica Gao & Cynthia True | Eddie Trigueros | January 5, 2009 | 118A | N/A |
| 16b | 16b | "Hen and Bappy" | Jessica Chaffin | Chris Graham & Sunil Hall | January 6, 2009 | 118B | N/A |
| 17a | 17a | "Ben Appetit" | Cynthia True, Jessica Chaffin & Jessica Gao | Louie del Carmen & Sherm Cohen | January 7, 2009 | 115A | N/A |
| 17b | 17b | "Dang It Feels Good to Be a Gamester" | Jessica Gao | Chris Graham | January 8, 2009 | 115B | N/A |
| 18a | 18a | "Portrait of a Happy" | Jessica Chaffin | Sunil Hall | June 8, 2009 | 119A | N/A |
| 18b | 18b | "O Say Can Bess See?" | Jessica Gao | Sunil Hall, Justin Ridge & Ian Graham | June 9, 2009 | 119B | N/A |
| 19a | 19a | "Macro Mayhem" | Mike Bell | Sherm Cohen, Sunil Hall & Ian Graham | June 10, 2009 | 120A | N/A |
| 19b | 19b | "Ben Screams for Ice Cream" | Story by : Cynthia True; Written by : Jessica Chaffin, Cynthia True & Jessica Gao | Lynne Naylor | June 11, 2009 | 120B | N/A |
| 20 | 20 | "Dragonflies" | Jessica Chaffin, Jessica Gao, Cynthia True & Erik Wiese | Louie del Carmen, Fred Gonzales & Ian Graham | June 12, 2009 | 111 | N/A |

=== Season 2 (2009–11) ===
| No. overall | No. in season | Title | Directed by | Written by | Storyboarded by | Original release date | Prod. code |
|---|---|---|---|---|---|---|---|
| 21 | 1 | "Catatonic" | Erik Wiese & Alex Kirwan | Cynthia True & Brendan Hay, Jessica Gao | Sunil Hall & Carey Yost | October 25, 2009 | 201 |
| 22a | 2a | "What's the Frequency, Bessie?" | Erik Wiese and Bill Wray | Brendan Hay & Cynthia True & Mike Bell | Aaron Paetz | September 25, 2009 | 202A |
| 22b | 2b | "Bee Nice" | Erik Wiese & Bill Wray | Jessica Gao Brendan Hay & Cynthia True | Katie Rice & Eddie Trigueros | September 24, 2009 | 202B |
| 23a | 3a | "Dirty Happy" | Erik Wiese & Eddie Trigueros | Brendan Hay | Justin Nichols | September 21, 2009 | 203A |
| 23b | 3b | "Tour D'Alcatraz" | Erik Wiese & Eddie Trigueros | Story by : Amanda Sitko; Written by : Richard Pursel & Brendan Hay | Kirk Tingblad, Mark Colangelo & David Gemmill | September 23, 2009 | 203B |
| 24a | 4a | "Hairy Situation" | Erik Wiese & Eddie Trigueros | Jessica Gao | Sunil Hall, Frank Molieri & Fred Gonzales | September 22, 2009 | 204A |
| 24b | 4b | "Bee Plus One" | Erik Wiese & Bill Wray | Julia Miranda & Cynthia True & Brendan Hay | Carey Yost | January 16, 2010 | 204B |
| 25a | 5a | "Bad to the Bee" | Erik Wiese & Bill Wray | Jessica Gao, Brendan Hay & Cynthia True | Justin Nichols | November 14, 2009 | 205A |
| 25b | 5b | "Hive of Darkness" | Erik Wiese & Alex Kirwan | Jessica Gao, Brendan Hay & Cynthia True | Aaron Paetz | January 16, 2010 | 205B |
| 26a | 6a | "Mr. Turtleton's Wild Ride" | Erik Wiese & Eddie Trigueros | Jessica Chaffin | Chris Graham & Fred Gonzales | June 18, 2011 | 206A |
| 26b | 6b | "A Pirate's Life for B" | Erik Wiese & Eddie Trigueros | Jessica Gao | Mike Mullen & David Gemmill | June 18, 2011 | 206B |
| 27a | 7a | "Awww-esome" | Erik Wiese & Eddie Trigueros | Cynthia True | Katie Rice | January 2, 2010 | 207A |
| 27b | 7b | "Dogcatcher in the Rye" | Erik Wiese & Bill Wray | Brendan Hay | Aaron Paetz | January 2, 2010 | 207B |
| 28a | 8a | "Rinx!" | Erik Wiese & Eddie Trigueros | Jessica Gao | Justin Nichols | November 6, 2010 | 208A |
| 28b | 8b | "Sleepless in San Francisco" | Erik Wiese & Eddie Trigueros | Brendan Hay | Katie Rice, Kirk Hanson & David Gemmill | November 6, 2010 | 208B |
| 29a | 9a | "Higgenbottom's 7" | Erik Wiese & Eddie Trigueros | Jessica Gao | Howie Perry | November 13, 2010 | 209A |
| 29b | 9b | "Finger Pickin' Bad" | Erik Wiese & Bill Wray | Cynthia True, Jessica Gao & Brendan Hay | Sunil Hall | November 13, 2010 | 209B |
| 30a | 10a | "It's B's Party" | Erik Wiese & Eddie Trigueros | Jessica Gao | Katie Rice | November 20, 2010 | 213A |
| 30b | 10b | "B-Chip" | Erik Wiese & Bill Wray | Julia Miranda | Aaron Paetz | November 20, 2010 | 213B |
| 31a | 11a | "Old Bee and the Sea" | Erik Wiese & Bill Wray | Brendan Hay | Aaron Paetz | November 29, 2010 | 214A |
| 31b | 11b | "One Million Years Bee.C." | Erik Wiese & Eddie Trigueros | Cynthia True, Jessica Gao & Brendan Hay | Steve L'Couilliard & Justin Nichols | November 29, 2010 | 214B |
| 32a | 12a | "The Bone Identity" | Erik Wiese & Eddie Trigueros | Jessica Gao, Brendan Hay & Cynthia True | Justin Nichols | November 30, 2010 | 215A |
| 32b | 12b | "Grumpy Old Bees" | Erik Wiese & Bill Wray | Brendan Hay | Sunil Hall | November 30, 2010 | 215B |
| 33a | 13a | "Children of the Unicorn" | Erik Wiese & Bill Wray | Brendan Hay | Justin Nichols | December 1, 2010 | 217A |
| 33b | 13b | "My Way or the Bee Way" | Erik Wiese & Eddie Trigueros | Brendan Hay | Ed Baker | December 1, 2010 | 217B |
| 34 35 | 14 15 | "O Brother, What Art Thou" Stuffed Happens" | Erik Wiese & Eddie Trigueros Erik Wiese, Eddie Trigueros & Bill Wray | Brendan Hay Jessica Gao, Brendan Hay & Cynthia True | Katie Rice, Kirk Hanson & Frank Molieri Justin Nichols, Sunil Hall & Chris Reccardi | December 2, 2010 | 210 211 |
| 36 | 16 | "Gorillas in the Midst" | Erik Wiese & Bill Wray | Brendan Hay & Jessica Gao, Cynthia True | Sunil Hall, Howie Perry, Eddie Trigueros & Dave Thomas | May 15, 2011 | 212 |
| 37a | 17a | "Space Evaders" | Erik Wiese & Bill Wray | Jessica Gao, Brendan Hay & Cynthia True | Howie Perry & Eddie Trigueros | May 22, 2011 | 216A |
| 37b | 17b | "YiPs" | Erik Wiese & Bill Wray | Jessica Gao | Miles Thompson, Aaron Paetz & Eddie Trigueros | May 22, 2011 | 216B |
| 38a | 18a | "Public Enembee" | Erik Wiese & Eddie Trigueros | Jessica Gao, Brendan Hay & Cynthia True | Matt Whitlock & Eddie Trigueros | May 29, 2011 | 218A |
| 38b | 18b | "Bang the Drum Timely" | Erik Wiese & Eddie Trigueros | Jessica Gao | Howie Perry & Sunil Hall | May 29, 2011 | 218B |
| 39a | 19a | "The League of Ordinary Gentlemen" | Erik Wiese & Eddie Trigueros | Jessica Gao, Brendan Hay & Cynthia True | Sunil Hall | June 5, 2011 | 219A |
| 39b | 19b | "Irritable Bowling Syndrome" | Erik Wiese & Bill Wray | Story by : Kristine Songco; Written by : Jessica Gao & Brendan Hay | Chris Reccardi & Justin Nichols | June 5, 2011 | 219B |
| 40a | 20a | "Bess-E" | Erik Wiese & Eddie Trigueros | Brendan Hay | Chris Reccardi & Eddie Trigueros | June 12, 2011 | 220A |
| 40b | 20b | "C'mon Get Happy!" | Erik Wiese & Bill Wray | Jessica Gao, Brendan Hay & Cynthia True | Howie Perry | June 12, 2011 | 220B |

== DVD releases ==
Region 1
| DVD title | Season(s) | Episode count | Release date | Episodes |
|---|---|---|---|---|
| We Got the Bee | 1 | 4 | February 24, 2009 | 1 ("So Happy Together" / "The Sweet Sixteenth") – 3 ("Artificial Unintelligence" / "We Got the Bee"), and 5 ("Bat Mitzvah Crashers" / "Super Secret Weakness") |
| BEEing Bessie Higgenbottom | 1 | 5 | December 8, 2009 | 14 ("Bee Patients" / "To Bee or Not To Bee"), 17 ("Ben Appetit" / "Dang, It Feels Good to Be a Gamester"), and 20 ("Dragonflies") |
