= Andy Richter =

American actor and announcer (born 1966)

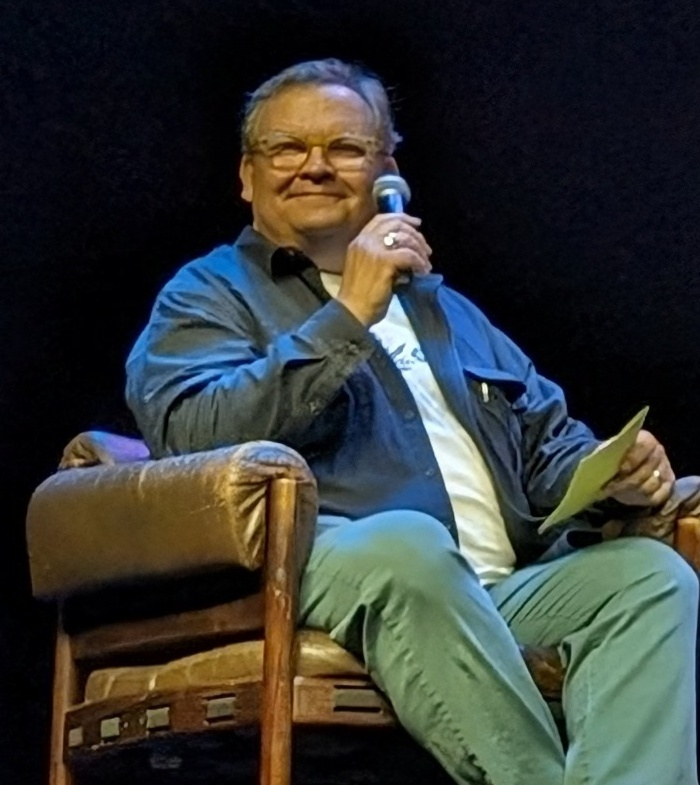
- Richter in 2024
- Born: Paul Andrew Richter; October 28, 1966 (age 60); Grand Rapids, Michigan, U.S.
- Education: Columbia College Chicago
- Occupations: Actor; comedian; writer; announcer
- Years active: 1988–present
- Spouses: Sarah Thyre (m. 1994; div. 2019): Jennifer Herrera (m. 2023)
- Children: 3

Comedy career
- Medium: Television; film
- Genres: Improvisational comedy; sketch comedy; cringe comedy; anti-humor; self-deprecation; blue comedy; alternative comedy; satire

Paul Andrew Richter (born October 28, 1966) is an American actor, comedian, writer, and talk show announcer. He is best known as the sidekick for Conan O'Brien on O'Brien's talk shows: Late Night, The Tonight Show on NBC, and Conan on TBS. He was also the star of the Fox television series Andy Richter Controls the Universe. He voiced Mort in the Madagascar film franchise and Ben Higgenbottom in the animated television series The Mighty B! on Nickelodeon. Since June 2019, Richter has hosted his own podcast, The Three Questions with Andy Richter, on the Earwolf network. In 2025, Richter played a supporting role in the supernatural horror film Obsession.

== Early life ==
Richter, the second of four children, was born in Grand Rapids, Michigan, to mother Glenda Swanson (née Palmer), a kitchen cabinet designer, and father Laurence R. Richter, who taught Russian at Indiana University for more than 32 years. Richter was raised in Yorkville, Illinois. He graduated from Yorkville High School in 1984, where he was elected Prom King. His parents divorced when he was 4 and his father later came out as bisexual. He is of Swedish and German descent.

== Career ==
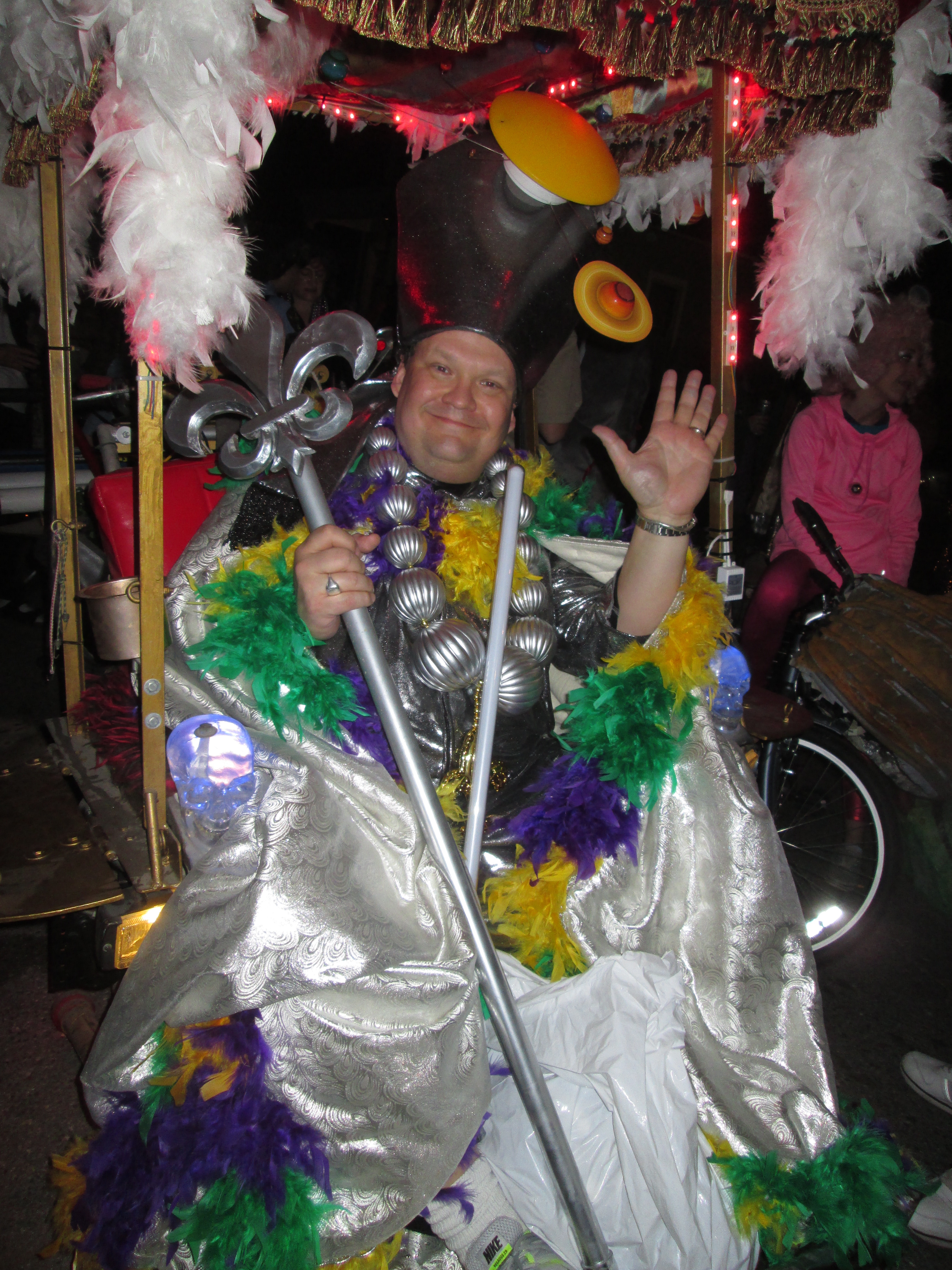
Andy Richter as "Pope" of the "Intergalactic Krewe of Chewbacchus" 2015 New Orleans Mardi Gras parade

In the late 1980s, Richter attended the University of Illinois Urbana–Champaign and Columbia College Chicago as a film major. While at Columbia, he learned the basics of comedic acting and writing by starring in numerous student films and videos. After leaving Columbia in 1988, Richter worked as a production assistant on commercial shoots in Chicago. In 1989, he began taking classes at Chicago's Improv Olympic. He went from student to "House Performer" within a year. Richter branched out working with "The Comedy Underground" and the Annoyance Theatre. Richter wrote for the short-lived Jonathan Brandmeier television show.

In the early 1990s, the Annoyance Theatre hit gold when producer Joey Soloway staged The Real Live Brady Bunch with live, word-for-word performances of the '70s sitcom. The show was so popular that it attracted national attention and moved to New York City. Richter was not an original member of the cast but the actor who played "Mike Brady" in the Chicago cast opted not to go to New York. Richter asked Soloway if he could play "Mike" in New York and, since Soloway had not cast a replacement, they agreed.

=== Late Night with Conan O'Brien ===
At the same time The Real Live Brady Bunch was playing in New York, two fellow Annoyance members (Beth Cahill and Melanie Hutsell, who played Marcia and Jan Brady in the "Real Live Brady Bunch" stage show) were hired as cast members on Saturday Night Live. With friends on SNL, Richter attended after-show parties, where he met SNL writer Robert Smigel. Two years later, Smigel hired Richter as a writer for a new show he was producing, Late Night with Conan O'Brien. Smigel sent Richter to join Conan O'Brien on stage during a practice run-through when the production staff was testing lighting angles and sound, and noticed the two had a strong rapport. He became O'Brien's sidekick just weeks before the show began airing in 1993.

Richter departed from Late Night after the show on May 26, 2000. He later said of the decision, "After seven years of being on the show, I got itchy. I have a philosophy that if you enjoy good fortune, rather than sit there and say, ‘Oh, that's fine, this amount is good enough for me,’ you should try and push it. You should see how much you can stretch your good fortune. And I was curious."

=== After Late Night ===
Richter left his post at Late Night in 2000 to pursue a career acting in films and television. His first major venture, Fox's Andy Richter Controls the Universe, was canceled after two mid-season runs. His next Fox sitcom, Quintuplets, lasted one season. His 2007 television series, Andy Barker P.I., was co-written and executive produced by Conan O'Brien. In the series, Richter played an accountant who could not attract clients. After a woman comes to his office thinking he is the former tenant, a private investigator, she asks him to find her husband, who she thinks faked his death. Barker decides to pursue this job and becomes a private detective in earnest, and continues to do his accounting job, which seems to pick up as the series goes on. The series aired on NBC, with all six episodes in the first season on NBC.com. The series was canceled after very poor ratings, despite being named by Entertainment Weekly as one of the Top Ten Shows of 2007.

=== The Tonight Show ===
On February 24, 2009, it was announced that Richter would rejoin O'Brien as the announcer for The Tonight Show with Conan O'Brien in Los Angeles. Richter frequently appeared in comedy sketches on the show and often commented and interacted with Conan during the opening monologue; he was also part of the show's writing staff. In mid-December 2009, Richter also began joining Conan on the couch during the celebrity interviews, much like he did in his former sidekick role on Late Night. Richter said he enjoyed having a steady paycheck again and not having to deal with production companies while developing television shows. Richter said, "Now I'm so happy to be back and making TV every night, not asking permission from somebody and waiting six months to get their sparklingly clear and cogent notes. And then wait another month for them to get back from Hawaii and say, 'Yes, now we can go make television.' I felt like a plumber who kept going into the building and saying, 'Can we put some pipes together?' and watching my wrenches gather dust."

=== Conan ===
When Conan O'Brien returned to the air as host of Conan on TBS in 2010, Richter followed and resumed his roles as announcer, writer, general sidekick and participant in comedy sketches.

=== The Three Questions with Andy Richter ===
Since June 2019, Richter has hosted his own podcast on the Earwolf network.

=== Game shows ===
In 2010, Richter was considered to be a potential host of the classic Pyramid game show that was being developed for CBS, but was ultimately not picked up by the network. Had the series been picked up, it would not have affected Richter's role on Conan. On May 18, 2011, TBS announced development of a possible new version of Pyramid, again to be hosted by Richter.

In June 2010, Richter hosted the Team Coco Presents the Conan Writers Live comedy special for TBS at the Just for Laughs festival in Chicago. He hosted in place of O'Brien, who was prohibited from hosting any television program until fall 2010.

In July 2013, Richter signed on to host a game show called Step Up, which was ordered by Fox.

Richter holds the record for all-time highest one-day score on Celebrity Jeopardy!, winning $68,000 during a first-round game of the 2009–10 season's "Jeopardy! Million Dollar Celebrity Invitational". His earnings were donated to the St. Jude Children's Research Hospital.

In January 2017, he began hosting the ABC game show Big Fan.

In September 2022, Richter appeared on the series premiere of Celebrity Jeopardy! He finished in second place, and won $30,000 for his charity The Los Angeles Regional Food Bank.

=== Other television appearances ===
In April 2002, Richter appeared in the Fox series Malcolm in the Middle. In "Clip Show", he played a psychiatrist giving therapy to Malcolm, Reese, and Dewey.

In October 2005, Richter appeared in the NBC sitcom Will & Grace. In "The Old Man and the Sea", he played an annoying blind date that was teased and misled by Grace Adler, who only dated him to prove she was not a snob.

Richter appeared in Monk as a murderer posing as Adrian Monk's best friend in the episode "Mr Monk Makes a Friend".

Richter appears in the Fox series Arrested Development in the 2006 episode "S.O.B.s." He plays every member of a fictional group of identical Richter quintuplets: Donnie, Chareth, Rocky, Emmett, and himself. He reprises the roles in several episodes of season 4, which aired in 2013 on Netflix.

From 2006 to 2008, Richter had a recurring role as "Sad Dad" Stan in the TV show The New Adventures of Old Christine.

He also provided the voice of Ben on the animated series The Mighty B!, played Simon Cristini on True Jackson, VP, and reprises the voice of Mort on The Penguins of Madagascar and All Hail King Julien.

Richter voiced himself in an episode of the 2021 Netflix animated sitcom Chicago Party Aunt.

In 2024, Richter competed in season twelve of The Masked Singer as "Dust Bunny" and had Dick Van Dyke (who competed as "Gnome" in season nine) as his Mask Ambassador. He was eliminated in the Group B premiere "Sports Night".

In 2025, Richter was announced to be competing on season thirty-four of Dancing with the Stars. He was partnered with professional dancer Emma Slater. He was nicknamed "the people's princess," because despite consistently receiving low scores from the judges, a large, dedicated fanbase of audience voters, nicknamed the "Fandys", allowed the couple to stay in the competition until they were eliminated during the quarterfinals on November 11, 2025, finishing in seventh place.

=== Film ===
In addition to his television work, Richter has appeared in motion pictures such as Aliens in the Attic, Big Trouble, Elf, Seeing Other People, New York Minute, Dr. Dolittle 2, the Madagascar franchise, My Boss's Daughter, Scary Movie 2, Frank McKlusky, C.I., Pootie Tang, Talladega Nights: The Ballad of Ricky Bobby, Blades of Glory, Semi-Pro, Lenny the Wonder Dog, Dr. T & the Women, Cabin Boy, and Obsession.

=== Other appearances ===
In 2008, Richter appeared in composer Marc Shaiman's satirical mini-musical called "Prop 8 — The Musical". The three-minute video was distributed on the internet at FunnyOrDie.com. In addition to Richter, the cast includes Jack Black, John C. Reilly, Craig Robinson, and many other celebrities, directed by Adam Shankman. The video won the 2009 Webby Award category Comedy: Individual Short or Episode, and won a GLAAD media award.

In July 2009, Richter played for the American League as a first baseman in the 2009 Taco Bell All-Star Legends and Celebrity Softball Game. Representing the Los Angeles Angels of Anaheim, Richter hit a home run in the game.

After the end of The Tonight Show with Conan O'Brien, Richter joined O'Brien on his Legally Prohibited from Being Funny on Television Tour, a stage show touring the United States and Canada over the spring of 2010. Richter served in his usual role as announcer and sidekick. Due to performing with O'Brien, Richter was forced to drop out of the Jeopardy! Million Dollar Celebrity Invitational, in which he was a semifinalist. Isaac Mizrahi replaced Richter in the tournament. Richter also made an appearance on the Disney Channel sitcom The Suite Life on Deck as a non-religious hooded brother, Brother Theodore in the episode "Silent Treatment".

In May 2021, Richter appeared on the Gus and Eddy Podcast hosted by comedy duo Gus Johnson and Eddy Burback.

== Personal life ==
Richter was married to comedic actress and author Sarah Thyre from 1994 to 2019, and they have two children, a son born in 2000 and a daughter born in 2005. Thyre was a cast member on the comedy series Strangers with Candy, on which Richter made frequent cameo appearances. Richter and Thyre also appeared together playing Hansel and Gretel in an episode of the Upright Citizens Brigade sketch comedy series on Comedy Central in 1998. On April 13, 2019, Richter announced on his Twitter account that he and Thyre had separated and had begun divorce proceedings. In November 2022 he announced his engagement to Jennifer Herrera. They married on June 10, 2023, in West Hollywood, with Conan O'Brien officiating. After their marriage Richter adopted Herrera’s daughter.

Richter is a supporter of Planned Parenthood. At a fundraiser in 2016, he referenced abortion services provided in 1992 for Thyre when the couple had split and were each undergoing great personal difficulties. He stated that although they were very sad about the situation, they both knew it was the right decision for them. He also said that he is "eternally grateful" to the organization for allowing them to care for themselves and also for the ability to choose the time to bring children into their lives.

On April 15, 2019, Richter joined other writers in firing their agents as part of the WGA's stand against the ATA and against film packaging, which they believed to be an unfair practice.

== Filmography ==
=== Film ===
Andy Richter film work
Year	Title	Role	Notes
1994	Cabin Boy	Kenny	
1996	Good Money	Happy	
1998	The Thin Pink Line	Ken Irvine	
1999	Barenaked in America	Himself	Documentary
2000	Dr. T & the Women	Eli	
2001	Dr. Dolittle 2	Eugene Wilson	
2001	Pootie Tang	Record executive	
2001	Scary Movie 2	Father Harris	
2001	Kids in the Hall: Same Guys, New Dresses	Himself	Documentary
2002	Gigantic (A Tale of Two Johns)	Himself	Documentary
2002	Run Ronnie Run!	Network executive #2	
2002	Martin & Orloff	Maitre 'D	
2002	Big Trouble	Jack Pendick/Ralph Pendick	
2002	Frank McKlusky, C.I.	Herb	
2002	God Hates Cartoons	Drinky Crow	Voice, direct-to-video
2002	The Cat Returns	Natoru	Voice
2003	End of the Century	Himself	Documentary
2003	My Boss's Daughter	Red Taylor	
2003	Elf	Morris	
2004	Death and Texas	Congressman Jack Levant	
2004	New York Minute	Bennie Bang	
2004	Seeing Other People	Carl	
2005	The Aristocrats	Himself	Documentary
2005	Madagascar	Mort	Voice
2005	Lenny the Wonder Dog	Lenny	Voice
2006	Talladega Nights: The Ballad of Ricky Bobby	Gregory	
2007	The Procedure	T. J.	Short film
2007	If I Had Known I Was a Genius	Game show host	
2007	Blades of Glory	Mountie	
2008	Semi-Pro	Bobby Dee	
2008	Madagascar: Escape 2 Africa	Mort	Voice
2008	Prop 8 — The Musical	Gay California man	Short film
2009	Aliens in the Attic	Uncle Nathan Pearson	
2011	Conan O'Brien Can't Stop	Himself	Documentary
2012	Madagascar 3: Europe's Most Wanted	Mort	Voice
2013	The Secret Life of Walter Mitty	Himself	
2014	Penguins of Madagascar	Mort	Voice cameo
2014	Jason Nash Is Married	Himself	
2016	Donald Trump's The Art of the Deal: The Movie	Pete Rozelle	
2017	Girlfriend's Day	Harold Lamb	
2021	Marcel the Shell with Shoes On	Mario	
2023	80 for Brady	Clark	
2023	First Time Female Director	Sheldonn Clifford	
2025	Obsession	Carter Harper	

=== Television ===
Andy Richter television work
Year	Title	Role	Notes
1993	The Positively True Adventures of the Alleged Texas Cheerleader-Murdering Mom	Police Officer	Television film
1993–2000	Late Night with Conan O'Brien	Himself (co-host)	1,247 episodes; also writer
1995	Mr. Show with Bob and David	Himself	Episode: "The Cry of a Hungry Baby"
1998	Upright Citizens Brigade	Hansel	Episode: "Story of the Toad"
1998	Saturday Night Live	Drinky Crow	Voice, episode: "Cameron Diaz/Smashing Pumpkins"; uncredited
1999	LateLine	Himself	Episode: "Pearce on Conan"
2000	Strangers with Candy	Various roles	3 episodes
2000	Just Shoot Me!	Alan	Episode: "Choosing to Be Super"
2000	DAG	Himself	Episode: "Pilot"; uncredited
2002	Ed	Barney Sticuzo	Episode: "Youth Bandits"
2002	Malcolm in the Middle	Dr. Kennedy	Episode: "Clip Show"
2002	Primetime Glick	Himself	Episode: "Andy Richter / Alec Baldwin"
2002–03	Andy Richter Controls the Universe	Andy Richter	19 episodes; also producer
2003	The Lyon's Den	Kelly Robbins	Episode: "Ex"
2004	Happy Family	Clerk	Episode: "The Headboard"
2004	It's All Relative	Dr. Bob	Episode: "Philip in a China Shop"
2004	Father of the Pride	Nelson	Episode: "What's Black, White and Depressed All Over?"
2004–05	Crank Yankers	Lloyd	Voice, 3 episodes
2004–05	Quintuplets	Bob Chase	22 episodes
2005–06, 2013	Arrested Development	The Richter Brothers	9 episodes
2005	Will & Grace	Dale	Episode: "The Old Man and the Sea"
2006–08	The New Adventures of Old Christine	Stan	4 episodes
2006–12	Metalocalypse	Various voices	3 episodes
2006–23	American Dad!	Various voices	16 episodes
2007	The Naked Trucker and T-Bones Show	Mayor William Q. Lefawn	Episode: "Key to the City"
2007	Andy Barker, P.I.	Andy Barker	6 episodes; also producer
2007	Clark and Michael	Jerry Lillard	Episode: "DA Dad and the Break-Up"
2007	30 Rock	Mitch Lemon	Episode: "Ludachristmas"
2007–08	Monk	Hal Tucker	2 episodes
2008	The Sarah Silverman Program	Potential Adoptive Parent	Episode: "Fetus Don't Fail Me Now"
2008	King of the Hill	Wesley Cherish	Voice, episode: "Straight as an Arrow"
2008–11	The Mighty B!	Benjamin Higgenbotton	Voice, 16 episodes
2008–11	Robot Chicken	Various voices	2 episodes
2008–15	The Penguins of Madagascar	Mort	Voice, 82 episodes
2009	Bones	Henry Simon	Episode: "Double Trouble in the Panhandle"
2009	True Jackson, VP	Simon Christini	Episode: "The Rival"
2009	Chuck	Brad	Episode: "Chuck Versus the Suburbs"
2009	The Goode Family	Fred Ridley	Voice, episode: "Public Disturbance"
2009	Merry Madagascar	Mort	Voice, television special
2009–10	The Tonight Show with Conan O'Brien	Himself (co-host)	145 episodes; also writer and announcer
2010	The Suite Life on Deck	Brother Theodore	Episode: "The Silent Treatment"
2010	Running Wilde	Dan Thorngood	Episode: "The Junior Affair"
2010	Glory Daze	Priest	Episode: "Hungry Like Teen Wolf"
2010–21	Conan	Himself (co-host)	Also writer and announcer
2011	Jon Benjamin Has a Van	"Celebrity Parkour" competitor	Episode: "The Van Scheme"
2011–15	China, IL	Agent Green	Voice, 4 episodes
2012	Hot in Cleveland	Father Brian	Episode: "Claus, Tails & High-Pitched Males: Birthdates 3"
2012–14	Comedy Bang! Bang!	Himself / narrator	3 episodes
2013	Happy Endings	Roy	Episode: "Bros Before Bros"
2013	Madly Madagascar	Mort	Voice, television special
2013	Randy Cunningham: 9th Grade Ninja	The Disciplinarian	Voice, episode: "Escape from Detention Island"
2013	Deon Cole's Black Box	Cameo	Episode: "Deon Discovers the Wettest in the Building"
2013	Brooklyn Nine-Nine	Doorman	Episode: "The Vulture"
2014	Sean Saves the World	Larry	Episode: "The Joy of Ex"
2014	Review	Auctioneer	Episode: "Celebrity; Batman"
2014	The Millers	Douglas Marie Dascal	Episode: "Walk-n-Wave"
2014–15	Maron	Himself	2 episodes
2014–17	All Hail King Julien	Mort, additional voices	Voice, 78 episodes
2015–23	Bob's Burgers	Wayne	Voice, 3 episodes
2016	Bajillion Dollar Propertie$	Art Gordon	Episode: "Inside Joke"
2016	The Jim Gaffigan Show	Mitch Gaffigan	Episode: "My Brother's Keeper"
2016–19	The Stinky & Dirty Show	Brave	Voice, 10 episodes
2016	Andy Richter's Home for the Holidays	Himself	Television film
2017	Big Fan	Himself (host)	4 episodes
2017	Life in Pieces	Julius Black	Episode: "Musical Motel Property Bingo"
2017	Michael Bolton's Big, Sexy Valentine's Day Special	Himself	Variety special
2017	Portlandia	Larry	Episode: "Passenger Rating"
2017	Animals	Prisoner	Voice, episode: "Humans"
2017	Justice League Action	Chronos	Voice, 2 episodes
2017–18	Santa Clarita Diet	Carl Coby	5 episodes
2017–21	Big Hero 6: The Series	Globby, additional voices	Voice, 13 episodes
2018	Mr. Pickles		Voice, episode: "S.H.O.E.S"
2018; 2021	Final Space	Gatekeeper	Voice, 2 episodes
2019	Black-ish	Mr. Schatz	Episode: "Relatively Grown Man"
2019	Corporate	Himself	Episode: "The Tragedy"
2020	Fresh Off the Boat	Himself	Episode: "Commencement"
2020	Earth to Ned	Himself	Episode: "Late Night Ned"
2020–22	Love, Victor	Coach Ford	6 episodes
2021	TrollsTopia	Disgruntle Weed	Voice, episode: "Disgruntle Weeds"
2021	Chicago Party Aunt		Voice, episode: "The Beefys"
2021–23	Big City Greens	Mayor Hansock	Voice, 3 episodes
2022	Beat Bobby Flay	Himself	Guest host; episode: "Let the Good Food Roll"
2022	Celebrity Jeopardy!	Himself	Contestant
2022	Hell's Kitchen	Himself	Guest diner; episode: "Wok This Way"
2022–23	The Boss Baby: Back in the Crib	Bradley / various	Voice, 5 episodes
2023	Fantasy Island	Game Show Host	Episode: "Paymer vs. Paymer"
2023	American Auto	Himself	Episode: "Celebrity"
2023	Stars on Mars	Himself	4 episodes
2023	Star Trek: Lower Decks	Beljo Tweekle	Voice, episode: "Twovix"
2024	The Masked Singer	Himself/Dust Bunny	Season 12 contestant
2025	Dancing with the Stars	Contestant	Season 34
2025	LEGO Masters Jr.	Contestant	Season 1, Episodes 1-4
2025	Elsbeth	Mickey	Season 3, Episode 1
2026	The Paper	Carl	Season 2, Episodes 6 and 9

=== Video games ===
Andy Richter video game work
Year	Title	Role	Notes
2012	Halo 4	Marine	Voice

Media offices
Preceded by John Melendez	The Tonight Show announcer 2009–2010	Succeeded by Wally Wingert
