= Moving Traditions =

American Jewish non-profit organization

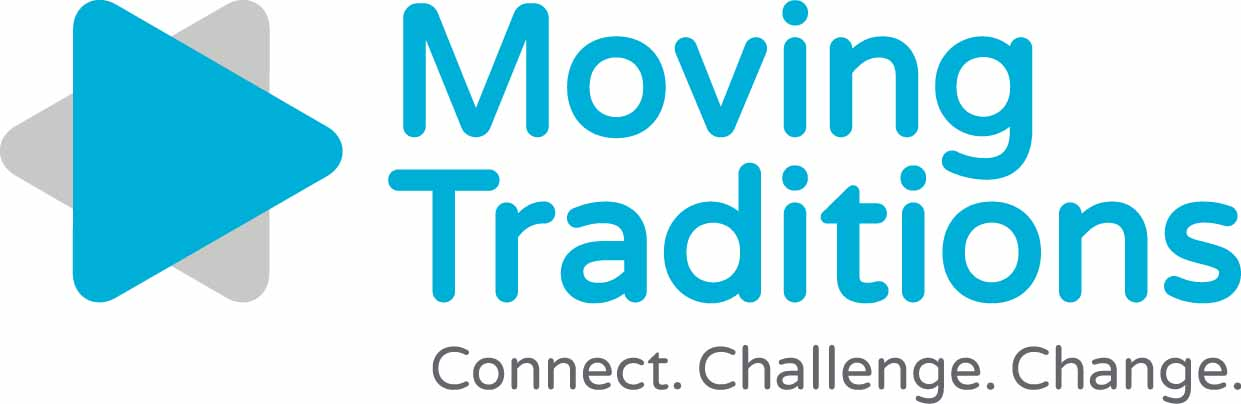
Moving Traditions logo

Moving Traditions is a Jewish non-profit organization that runs educational programs for teenagers. The organization was founded in 2005 and is based in Elkins Park, Pennsylvania.

== Mission ==
The organization recognizes the disconnect between the social realities that teens face today and the programming offered to them by many organizations in the Jewish Community. The organization researches and develops curricula, trains educators to inspire teens, and assists institutions in weaving the approach into educational models. Because of this approach, Moving Traditions has been named "one of the 50 most innovative Jewish organizations" by Slingshot '16 for the 10th year.

It uses their educational programs as a way to keep Jewish education relevant. Most Jewish teens in the United States do not continue with any form of Jewish education after having a Bar or Bat Mitzvah. Sally Gottesman, its cofounder, says that a community should be making Bar and Bat Mitzvah "a rite of passage into something rather than from something." With their educational programs for boys and girls, Moving Traditions encourages participating in the program through 12th grade and focuses on addressing relevant topics that teenage boys and girls are dealing with.

== Programs ==
=== Rosh Hodesh ===
Rosh Hodesh is a Jewish educational program which draws on Jewish themes and principles to help girls in grades 8–12 face the intricacies of adolescent life. The name of the program is derived from the Jewish holiday of Rosh Hodesh, which marks the beginning of every lunar month. It is a hybrid between a youth group and a facilitated discussion. It meets on a monthly basis, and is based on the Jewish tradition of a women's new moon celebtrations. Moving traditions partners with synagogues, schools, and Jewish Community Centers to operate the program. The organization trains adult group leaders to facilitate the Rosh Hodesh groups. They meet and discuss adolescent girls' self-esteem, leadership, competition, body image, Jewish identity and friendships.

=== Shevet Achim ===
Shevet Achim is the male counterpart. The name of the program is derived from the prayer Hine Ma Tov meaning "here's to what's good" from Psalm 133. The program grew out of three years of research conducted by the organization and published in the article Engaging Jewish Teen Boys: A Call to Action. Funders of the campaign for Jewish Boys include the UJA-Federation of New York, Jewish Federation of Greater Philadelphia, Rose Community Foundation, and the Lasko Family Foundations and the Covenant Foundation. It is a program for eighth- and ninth-grade boys with over 30 groups in 7 cities. Each meeting starts with a cooperative and non competitive game, or with food preparation, the goal of which is to break the ground for deeper conversation. Rabbi Daniel Brenner, director for initiatives for boys and men for Moving Traditions, believes that the program fills a void in the typical adolescent male life. Brenner says that "boys have physical and spiritual lives. If you just ask them 'How are you feeling?' they will say 'duhhh.' So you have to get to a place where they can engage." Moving Traditions trains group leaders to facilitate Shevet Achim. Each meeting focuses on allowing the boys to decompress from stressful lives and balance clowning and horseplay with deep discussions of Judaism and ethics.

=== Tzelem ===
Tzelem is a national online group for Jewish teens who identify as transgender, nonbinary, gender fluid, and gender questioning Jewish teens in partnership with Keshet.

=== Bat Mitzvah Comes of Age ===
The organizations and The National Museum of American Jewish History have collaborated to organize a traveling exhibition, Bat Mitzvah Comes of Age, featuring the story of how, in less than a century, individual girls, their parents and their rabbis challenged communal values to institute this now widely practiced Jewish ritual of the Bat Mitzvah. The exhibition is based on more than 150 responses to the Bat Mitzvah survey and showcases the evolution of the Bat Mitzvah through the stories of women who pioneered the sacred ritual of the Bat Mitzvah. "A couple years ago we wanted to show the evolution of the bat mitzvah" says Deborah Meyer, executive director and cofounder at Moving Traditions. "the ceremony is often taken for granted; now every girl today seems to have a bat mitzvah. In Judaism, for thousands of years, it was men who were on the pulpit and now in the last several decades women have been welcomed to participate in the worship."

The exhibit includes oral history recordings of Bat Mitzvah stories and artifacts across history and Jewish movements and an interactive component in which visitors can share their coming of age stories. The exhibit mentions both everyday people as well as noted women, including Supreme Court Justice Elena Kagan and activist Ruth Messinger. Now at the Jewish Community Center of Metropolitan Detroit through March 2013, the exhibit was launched in Manhattan in April 2012 and has since traveled to the Marcus Jewish Community Center of Atlanta and Larchmont Temple in Westchester, New York. The exhibit will next travel to the Jewish Museum of Florida in Miami Beach and the Oregon Jewish Museum in Portland.
