= Erik Wiese =

American animator and storyboard artist

- Born: Erik Guerrero-Wiese; January 24, 1974 (age 52); Hollywood, California, U.S.
- Other name: Erik C. Wiese
- Education: California Institute of the Arts; Los Angeles County High School for the Arts; ArtCenter College of Design
- Occupations: Director, writer, producer, story artist, animator
- Years active: 1994–present
- Known for: Snoopy Presents: A Summer Musical; SpongeBob SquarePants; Samurai Jack; The Fairly OddParents; Danny Phantom; The Mighty B! Sonic Prime
- Spouse: Cynthia True (m. 2007)

Erik C. Wiese (born Erik Guerrero-Wiese; January 24, 1974) is an American director, writer, storyboard artist and animator. He directed the Apple TV+ Peanuts musical special Snoopy Presents: A Summer Musical (2025). He is also known for his work on the animated series SpongeBob SquarePants (1999–present), beginning with his character development and design for its pilot episode, "Help Wanted". He is the co-creator of the television series The Mighty B! (2008–2011), where he served as director, executive producer, writer, voice director, and storyboard artist for the series. He studied animation at the California Institute of the Arts.

Wiese's other credits include The SpongeBob SquarePants Movie as a storyboard artist and animator, Rugrats in Paris as a layout artist, Danny Phantom as the lead storyboard artist, The Fairly OddParents as a storyboard artist, and Samurai Jack as a writer and storyboard artist. He has worked on CatDog as a character designer and layout artist, The X's as a storyboard artist, and as a director on the 2000 animated series Sammy.

Wiese served as a character layout artist, animation supervisor, and assistant director to John Kricfalusi at Spümcø, working on the animated Björk music video "I Miss You", and the Ranger Smith cartoons A Day in the Life of Ranger Smith and Boo Boo Runs Wild.

Wiese briefly worked in video games in 1995 as a storyboard and concept artist for Donald Starring in Maui Mallard and The Lion King. In the 2010s, Wiese served as the storyboard supervisor and head of story on The SpongeBob Movie: Sponge Out of Water, a supervising producer on the French-British animated series Dude, That's My Ghost!, and as a writer on the unreleased Star Wars Detours.

== Filmography ==
=== Film ===
Year	Title	Role
2000	Rugrats in Paris: The Movie	storyboard artist/character layout artist
2004	The SpongeBob SquarePants Movie	production storyboard artist
2015	The SpongeBob Movie: Sponge Out of Water	storyboard supervisor
2017	Smurfs: The Lost Village	story artist
2018	Hotel Transylvania 3: Summer Vacation	story artist

=== Television ===
Year	Title	Role
1998–1999	CatDog	character designer/intertitle design/storyboard clean-up/storyboard artist
1999–2000; 2005–2007; 2014	SpongeBob SquarePants	character layout artist/clean-up artist/key animator/assistant storyboard artist/writer/songwriter/storyboard artist/storyboard director/special thanks
1999	Boo Boo Runs Wild	layout artist
1999	A Day in the Life of Ranger Smith	layout artist
2000	Sammy	director
2000	Dora the Explorer	storyboard artist (episode: "Grandma's House")
2001–2008	The Fairly OddParents	storyboard artist
2001–2004	Samurai Jack	storyboard artist/writer
2003	Johnnie Talk	Himself
2004	Danny Phantom	storyboard artist
2005	The X's	storyboard artist (episode: "Photo Ops")
2008–2011	The Mighty B!	co-creator/story/writer/storyboard artist/director/creative director/executive producer
2011	Kick Buttowski: Suburban Daredevil	storyboard artist
2013	Dude, That's My Ghost!	supervising producer
2015	Zip Zip	writer
2015–2017	Dawn of the Croods	director/supervising producer
2019	Star Wars Detours	writer
2022	Sonic Prime	writer/director/executive producer
2025	Snoopy Presents: A Summer Musical	director (television special)

=== Video games ===
Year	Title	Role
1994	The Lion King	concept art/storyboard artist
1995	Donald in Maui Mallard	concept artist/character developer
1999	Disney's Tarzan Activity Center	assistant animator

=== Music video ===
Year	Title	Role
1997	I Miss You	assistant director/animation supervisor

=== Brands ===
Year	Title	Role
1997	Nike	Animator
