= Adult bar and bat mitzvah =

Jewish tradition

Adult Bar and bat mitzvah
- Native name: Bar mītsvā: בַּר מִצְוָה; Bat mītsvā: בַּת מִצְוָה
- Type: Symbolic coming-of-age ceremony
- Theme: To mark the assumption or reaffirmation of Jewish religious responsibilities

An adult bar/bat mitzvah is a bar or bat mitzvah of a Jewish person older than the customary age. Traditionally, a bar or bat mitzvah occurs at age 13 for boys and 12 for girls. Adult Jews who have never had a bar or bat mitzvah may choose to have one later in life, and many who have had one at the traditional age choose to have a second. An adult bar or bat mitzvah can be held at any age after adulthood is reached and can be performed in a variety of ways.

The adult and child b'nai mitzvot differ mainly in planning; adults plan their own celebrations, while children's are organized by their community or parent(s). Additionally, many relatives of the child may have died, and the adult often has a family of their own. Some Jewish men hold a second bar mitzvah at age 83, marking 70 years since their first.

== Reasons ==
- Many adult men and women did not have a bat mitzvah as children due to lack of popularity and/or restrictive gender norms.
- Individuals with learning disabilities that made the process of preparing for their bar or bat mitzvah too difficult during childhood.
- Adults who have converted to Judaism may want a bar or bat mitzvah.
- Many non-religious Jews who had little or no Jewish education as children.
- Those who have had a bar or bat mitzvah as children decide to undergo renewal.
- Transgender Jews who had a bar or bat mitzvah as their gender assigned at birth may wish to have the other one as an adult using their new gender and name.
- Many Holocaust survivors didn't have the opportunity to have a bar or bat mitzvah.

== History ==
Rabbi Albert Axelrad of Brandeis University officiated the first adult bar and bat mitzvahs in the early 1970s. He encouraged the practice in all denominations of Judaism.

Between 1995 and 2001, Hadassah held group adult Bat Mitzvah ceremonies for 180 women.

In 2001, the Union for Reform Judaism created a guide on adult bar and bat mitzvah programs which was adopted by 900 congregations. In 2002, the Conservative Movement adopted this guide as well.

== Process ==
The process of becoming a bar or bat mitzvah for adults involves studying for a year or longer. It consists of Hebrew language, Jewish rituals, Torah readings, and Haftorah readings. Many synagogues provide classes for adults.

== Notable adult bar and bat mitzvahs ==
- Paula Abdul had an adult bat mitzvah in Safed in 2013, at the age of 51. She had originally planned to hold it at the Western Wall in Jerusalem but changed her plans due to jet lag and the media circus that would follow.
- Armand Hammer died on December 11, 1990, on the evening before his planned bar mitzvah, at the age of 92.
- In 2012, actor David Arquette celebrated his bar mitzvah, at the age of 40 at the Kotel.
- Yisrael Kristal held his bar mitzvah at the age of 113. He was the world's oldest living man at the time.
- In December 2019, comedian Tiffany Haddish celebrated her bat mitzvah, at the age of 40.
- Drake had a repeated bar mitzvah at the age of 31, after his previous bar mitzvah at the age of 13.
- James Franco had a charity event for his bar mitzvah in 2015, at the age of 37.
- Former TV host Mario Kreutzberger, Don Francisco, had a second bar mitzvah in 2024, at the age of 83

In popular culture, there have been depictions of adult bar mitzvahs on TV shows:

- An episode during the last season of The Dick Van Dyke Show depicts Buddy having his bar mitzvah, having been too poor to have one as a boy.
- The Simpsons episode "Today I Am a Clown" depicts Krusty the Klown having a bar mitzvah.
- On an episode of Touched by an Angel, Kirk Douglas played a man who (like Douglas himself) has a second bar mitzvah at the age of 83.
- In 2025, Robert Kraft, owner of the New England Patriots, celebrated a second bar mitzvah with Chabad at Chestnut Hill in Massachusetts.
