= The Mighty B! =

American animated television series

- Genre: Comedy
- Created by: Amy Poehler; Cynthia True; Erik Wiese
- Directed by: Erik Wiese; Larry Leichliter (season 1)
- Creative director: Erik Wiese
- Voices of: Amy Poehler; Dee Bradley Baker; Andy Richter; Dannah Feinglass; Megan Cavanagh; Grey DeLisle; Jessica DiCicco; Sarah Thyre
- Theme music composer: Amy Miles; Michael Robertson
- Opening theme: "The Mighty B! Theme Song"
- Ending theme: "Boys and Girls" by Jean-Jacques Perrey
- Composer: James L. Venable (first episode only)
- Country of origin: United States
- Original language: English
- No. of seasons: 2
- No. of episodes: 40 (74 segments) (list of episodes)

Production
- Executive producers: Paper Kite Productions: Amy Poehler; Polka Dot Pictures: Cynthia True; Erik Wiese
- Running time: 22 minutes
- Production companies: Paper Kite Productions; Polka Dot Pictures; Nickelodeon Animation Studio

Original release
- Network: Nickelodeon
- Release: April 26, 2008 – January 16, 2010
- Network: Nicktoons
- Release: November 6, 2010 – June 18, 2011

The Mighty B! (stylized in all caps) is an American comedy animated television series created by Amy Poehler, Cynthia True, and Erik Wiese for Nickelodeon. The series centers on Bessie Higgenbottom, an ambitious Honeybee girl scout who believes she will become The Mighty B (a superhero) if she collects every Honeybee badge. Bessie lives in San Francisco with her single mother Hilary, brother Ben and dog Happy. Poehler provides the voice of Bessie, who is loosely based on the character Cassie McMadison, who Poehler played on the improvisational comedy troupes Upright Citizens Brigade and Second City before she joined the cast of SNL.

The series ran on Nickelodeon from April 26, 2008, to January 16, 2010, before moving to Nicktoons on November 6, 2010, and ending on June 18, 2011. After its debut, the show had attracted an average of 3.1 million viewers. In the second quarter of 2008, the show ranked among the top five animated programs on television.

In September 2008, the show was renewed for a second and final season with 20 episodes that premiered on September 21, 2009.

The Mighty B! was nominated for six Annie Awards and four Daytime Emmy Awards, winning one Daytime Emmy for Outstanding Individual Achievement in Animation. It has garnered one Artios Award nomination and one Golden Reel Award nomination.

== Premise ==
The show is set in San Francisco, California, and revolves around the adventures of Bessie Higgenbottom, an ambitious and optimistic 9-year-old Honeybee scout who wears her uniform every day. She believes she will become a superhero called The Mighty B if she collects every Honeybee badge. As of the first episode, she has 4,584 badges to go. Her loyal younger brother, Benjamin "Ben", aspires to be her sidekick. Happy, a stray dog with a torn ear, is Bessie's pet and best friend. Bessie and Ben live with their single mother, Hilary, who owns and operates a coffee shop called Hilary's Café. Bessie has an "imaginary friend"; Finger, which is her index finger with a smiley face on her left hand.

Many recurring characters appear alongside the Higgenbottom family, including the Honeybee scouts; Penny is Bessie's clumsy, dim-witted, obese best friend, who loves taffy. Although she and Bessie are best friends, Penny also shows loyalty to Portia and Gwen. Portia is a bratty, and snobby Honeybee scout, whose mother is the troop leader. Along with the business-minded Gwen, Portia is often opposing Bessie or tries to ruin her life. Bessie is also friends with Rocky Rhodes, an older, "cool" skater who works part-time at Hilary's Café.

== Episodes ==
Season	Segments	Episodes	Originally released	
Season	Segments	Episodes	First released	Last released
1	39	20	April 26, 2008	June 12, 2009
2	35	20	September 20, 2009	June 18, 2011

== Characters ==
=== Main ===
The main characters; Ben, Bessie and dog Happy.

- Bessie Kajolica Higgenbottom (voiced by Amy Poehler) She is a 9-year-old, geeky, bespectacled "Honeybee Scout" characterized by her extreme hyperactivity and unshakably dedicated work ethic. She also has an imaginary friend named Finger on her right index finger.
- Happy Walter Higgenbottom (vocal effects by Dee Bradley Baker) is Bessie's cherished pet dog.
- Penny Lefkowitz (voiced by Dannah Feinglass) is Bessie's awkward, dull, chubby best friend who also serves as a lackey to Portia.
- Benjamin "Ben" Higgenbottom (voiced by Andy Richter) is Bessie's 6-year-old younger brother. He has a teddy bear named Mr. Pants.
- Hilary Higgenbottom (voiced by Megan Cavanagh) is a 41-year-old single hippie and the mother of Bessie, Happy and Ben who owns and operates a coffee shop called Hilary's Café.
- Portia Gibbons (voiced by Grey DeLisle) is Mary Frances' daughter, who goes out of her way to get under Bessie, who tends to treat her as a good friend.
- Gwen Wu (voiced by Jessica DiCicco) is one of Portia's best friends who is "totally tuned into hip hop and urban culture, music and fashion."
- Mary Frances Gibbons (voiced by Sarah Thyre) is the Honeybee troop leader and Portia's mother.

=== Supporting ===
- Millie Millerson (voiced by Grey DeLisle) is a Honeybee scout with a slow way of talking and loves shiny or reflective objects, such as tinsel or confetti.
- Rocky Rhodes (voiced by Kenan Thompson) is a skater who works part-time as a waiter at Hilary's Café. He is written out of the show after the first season.
- Hippie (voiced by Matt Besser) is a nameless hippie who roams around town without a care in the world.
- Mr. Wu (voiced by Keone Young) is the owner of a Chinese restaurant and Gwen Wu's father.
- Miriam Breedlove (voiced by Niecy Nash) is the founder of the Honeybees. She once went to brunch with Bessie, after Bessie won a competition and later helps her out occasionally.
- Anton St. Germain (voiced by Matt Besser) is a dog show judge in "So Happy Together", but he has also been shown as the science fair judge and the head of city council. He is a good friend of Mary Frances as she often bribes him.
- Chelsea Gibbons (voiced by Jessica Chaffin) is Portia's even more conceited, bratty, and snobby cousin. She is the only character that intimidates Portia.
- Donald (voiced by Kevin Michael Richardson) is a resident mailman.
- Ronnie (voiced by Grey DeLisle) is a young Beaver scout who is fat, pudgy kid who leads the Beavers. His finger, Digit, rivals Finger, Bessie's finger.
- Mr. Lefkowitz (voiced by Dee Bradley Baker) is Penny’s well-meaning father.
- Rainbow (voiced by Jill Talley) is a hippie tour guide with a sense of humor.
- K.G. Bianca (voiced by Grey DeLisle) of the S.H.A.D.O.W. (Seriously Hardcore Attack Dogs Operating Worldwide) organization, which trains attack dogs to fight. She was Happy's former owner, and tries in each of her appearances to make him rejoin S.H.A.D.O.W. by force.
- Chester Turtleton (voiced by Dee Bradley Baker) is Millie’s beloved pet turtle.
- The Doctor (voiced by Rob Corddry) is Bessie’s local doctor who is also Happy’s veterinarian and a dentist on one occasion.

== Voice cast ==
Former SNL cast member Amy Poehler voices Bessie Higgenbottom, a 9¾-year-old Honeybee scout. Poehler describes her as "superoptimistic and a super spaz" and "a bit bossy, but with good intentions". She is based on a character Poehler had played during her time at improvisational comedy troupes Second City and Upright Citizens Brigade, but also girls Poehler looked up to when she was younger, which she called "the leaders". Poehler provides the voice of Bessie only, but for the episode "Boston Beean", she provided the voice of Sissy Sullivan, a Honeybee scout from Boston whose voice sounded exactly like Bessie's. Dee Bradley Baker voices Happy, Bessie's dog which she found at the harbor in the first episode "So Happy Together". Andy Richter voices Ben Higgenbottom, Bessie's younger brother. Richter is also the voice of Mort on another Nick show The Penguins of Madagascar. Richter talked about The Mighty B!, quoting: "[...] another dream come true, to be able to do cartoon voices! And, also, to get to do cartoon voices for [Ben and Mort] two really funny, cool cartoons that my kids love and that I'm proud to have them love. It's pretty great." Dannah Feinglass voices Penny, Bessie's sidekick. Feinglass is also a writer for the show. Grey DeLisle voices Portia Gibbons, a Honeybee scout, Megan Cavanagh voices Hilary Higgenbottom, Bessie and Ben's single mother, and Jessica DiCicco voices Gwen, Portia's best friend.

In addition to the main cast, Sarah Thyre, Kenan Thompson, Matt Besser, Keone Young, Jessica Chaffin and Kevin Michael Richardson voice supporting characters. Guest stars that have appeared on the show include Jill Talley, Jackée Harry, Rob Corddry, John Ross Bowie, Brian Posehn, Zachary Gordon, Paul Butcher, Niecy Nash, Maya Rudolph, Dan Schneider, Audrey Wasilewski, and Mike O'Malley. Poehler's then husband, Will Arnett, also guest starred on the show, in the episode "Tour D'Alcatraz" as Captain Stonewall.

== Production and development ==
Several years before The Mighty B! premiered, co-creator and former SNL cast member Amy Poehler and a number of people at Nickelodeon were speaking and thinking about making a "female-driven" animated television series. Poehler stated that the series would be pitched as: "where this girl is at that great age [...] where you're not boy-crazy and you're not rude to other girls". She found that enthusiasm "fascinating" and wanted to "bottle it and take it like a pill".

The Mighty B! was picked up for a pilot in early 2006 under the name of Super Scout. It was co-created by Poehler, Cynthia True and Erik Wiese. Brown Johnson, president of animation at Nickelodeon, was "absolutely thrilled to have a comedy team of the caliber of Amy, Erik and Cynthia create this iconic character for a new generation". Poehler said that she was "thrilled that the world will finally meet the funny and sweet girl-tornado that is Bessie Higgenbottom [...] Erik, Cynthia and I are so pleased to be working with the wonderful people at Nickelodeon. In the words of Bessie, it's been awesome!"

Bessie is loosely based on a character Poehler had played during her time at improvisational comedy troupes Second City and Upright Citizens Brigade as well as girls she looked up to when she was younger. She described Bessie as a "feisty, plucky, bossy, Honey Bee scout" and called her "our hero [...] who goes on all these adventures in hopes of collecting all these badges". Poehler referred to the show as "double the action, triple the adventures and quadruple the awesomeness". During an interview with TV Guide, when asked if Poehler was trying to appeal adults with the show, she wrote:

"Yeah. What I love about SpongeBob SquarePants is that it's very watchable for an adult. But kids like it because they don't feel like they're being pandered to. That was what we were looking to do with The Mighty B! [...] We wanted to do a show that had a strong female character who didn't have too many rainbows and unicorns."

== Home media ==
A DVD of selected episodes from the series, entitled We Got the Bee, was released on February 24, 2009. It contained 8 episodes, behind the scenes footage, an animatic version of the episode "Bat Mitzvah Crashers", and a karaoke music video for "Running with the Rainbow Unicorn". Another DVD, named BEEing Bessie Higgenbottom, was released on December 8, 2009, exclusively at Amazon.com. This release contains 3 episodes as well as the karaoke music video for "Buzz Off" from the Dragonflies special. It is published on demand onto DVD-Rs. On December 8, 2020, the entire series was added to Paramount+ (formerly CBS All Access).

== Reception ==
=== Critical reception ===
One review from Brian Lowry of Variety explained it contains a "kind of crazed energy and inventiveness that isn't associated often enough with girl-oriented children's fare [...] [and] opts for a more elevated approach – like that aforementioned roller-coaster jaunt, taking a free-spirited jump off the tracks and trusting its audience to hang on for the ride." David Hinckley of Daily News gave the show four stars, while writing that The Mighty B! "has a decent shot at becoming a pre-tween fave". Aaron H. Bynum of Animation Insider called the series a "good, brainless cartoon [...] [Because] viewers shouldn't ever be bored with Bessie," but criticized part of its humor for not "try[ing] to do too much, which may ultimately work against it when the story calls for the characters to do too little.

Denver Post contributor Joanne Ostrow declared the protagonist of the series a "female answer to SpongeBob SquarePants". Ed Liu of Toon Zone called The Mighty B! a show that he admires more than what he "truly love[s]", stating: "There is prodigious talent behind it and its wonderfully energetic, boisterous comedy. It's clearly trying very, very hard to be entertaining and largely succeeds [...] I almost feel bad for not liking The Mighty B! more than I do, and I'm still not sure why I don't enjoy it more". He noted it was worth pointing out that more recent episodes of the show seem "more assured and funnier" than the eight episodes on the We Got the Bee DVD.

Emily Ashby of Common Sense Media gave the series 3 out of 5 stars; saying that, "Bessie is fairly one-dimensional; her single-minded devotion to badge acquisition (which she often pursues by pestering both adults and her peers to get her way) means that her social skills suffer. Plus, the show maintains a chaotic pace, and there are no real attempts to teach strong positive lessons. While Bessie's dedication to her goal could theoretically be considered admirable, the show makes light of her disregard for her adoring younger brother's feelings and her lack of real friends (in favor of an imaginary pal she draws on her finger and her reluctant dog sidekick). You have to wonder - are those the makings of a truly mighty hero?" But Ashby added that, "young tweens will likely enjoy Bessie's outlandish, fantasy-fueled adventures - which are fast-paced and, on the surface, entertaining." Marilyn Moss from The Hollywood Reporter said, "Nickelodeon's new animated series "The Mighty B!" has what every kid needs in order to grow up strong and self-sufficient in today's adult world: violence, nonsensical verbiage and, most importantly, a built-in idea that you rule the universe. It used to be called narcissism, something that kids are thought to need in order to negotiate childhood. Then it's supposed to disappear. But with the violent, clanging-banging kids and action we see in "Mighty B!" it could last forever if young minds get overloaded on programming with this kind of senselessness."

=== Ratings ===
The Mighty B! premiered at 10:30 AM on April 26, 2008, and scored "above average for Nickelodeon programming" in the Nielsen ratings. It ranked in the top ten of all programming for combined broadcast and basic cable shows, with 1.92 million viewers in the 2–11 demographic and a rating of 5.2/23. The Mighty B! had double the viewership as Bakugan Battle Brawlers, a show that aired simultaneously on Cartoon Network.

In September 2008, the show had an average of 3.1 million viewers, and in the second quarter of 2008, the show ranked among the top five animated programs on television. During the third quarter of 2009, it averaged 2.6 million viewers, and was number-one in its timeslot in the children's 2-11 and children's 6-11 demographics.

=== Awards ===
The Mighty B! and its crew have been nominated for six Annie Awards. The show has also been nominated for four Daytime Emmy Awards, winning one. It has also been nominated for one Artios Award and one Golden Reel Award.

Award	Category	Nominee	Result
2009 Golden Reel Awards	Best Sound Editing – Television Animation		Nominated
2009 Artios Awards	Outstanding Achievement in Casting – Animation TV Programming	Sarah Noonan	Nominated
2009 Annie Awards	Best Animated Television Production for Children		Nominated
2009 Annie Awards	Best Production Design in an Animated Television Production or Short Form	Seanna Hong; For "Bee Patients"	Nominated
2009 Annie Awards	Best Storyboarding in an Animated Television Production or Short Form	Eddie Trigueros; For "Name Shame"	Nominated
2009 Daytime Emmy Awards	Outstanding Individual Achievement in Animation	Larry Murphy	Won
2009 Daytime Emmy Awards	Outstanding Performer in an Animated Program	Amy Poehler	Nominated
2010 Annie Awards	Best Animated Television Production for Children		Nominated
2010 Annie Awards	Best Character Design in a Television Production	Bryan Arnett; For "Catatonic"	Nominated
2010 Annie Awards	Best Storyboarding in a Television Production	Sunil Hall; For "Catatonic"	Nominated
2010 Daytime Emmy Awards	Outstanding Performer in an Animated Program	Amy Poehler	Nominated
2010 Daytime Emmy Awards	Outstanding Directing in an Animated Program	Erik Wiese; Alex Kirwan; Cynthia True	Nominated
