= List of DreamWorks Animation productions =

The following is a list of productions produced by DreamWorks Animation, a division of NBCUniversal, which includes animated feature films, shorts, specials, and television series. As of 2026, DreamWorks Animation has produced 54 feature films, with their first being Antz on October 2, 1998, and their latest being Forgotten Island on September 25, 2026.

Their upcoming slate of films includes CoComelon: The Movie on February 19, 2027, the live-action remake of How To Train Your Dragon 2 on June 11, 2027, Shrek 5 on June 30, 2027, and Donkey on June 30, 2028. In addition, two unannounced films are scheduled to be released on September 24, 2027 and September 22, 2028, respectively.

== Feature films ==
=== Released ===
Film	Release date	Director(s)	Writer(s)		Producer(s)	Composer(s)	Distributor	Co-production with	Animation/production service(s)
Film	Release date	Director(s)	Story	Screenplay	Producer(s)	Composer(s)	Distributor	Co-production with	Animation/production service(s)
Antz	October 2, 1998	Eric Darnell; Tim Johnson	Todd Alcott; Chris Weitz; Paul Weitz	Todd Alcott; Chris Weitz; Paul Weitz	Brad Lewis; Aron Warner; Patty Wooton	Harry Gregson-Williams; John Powell	DreamWorks Pictures	Pacific Data Images (Note: Also production company.)	Pacific Data Images
The Prince of Egypt	December 18, 1998	Brenda Chapman; Steve Hickner; Simon Wells	Based on: Book of Exodus	Based on: Book of Exodus	Penney Finkelman Cox; Sandra Rabins	Hans Zimmer (score) Stephen Schwartz (songs)	DreamWorks Pictures	—N/a	DWA Glendale; Bardel Animation Limited; Fox Animation Studios (additional final line animation); Heart of Texas Productions (additional final line animation)
The Prince of Egypt	December 18, 1998	Brenda Chapman; Steve Hickner; Simon Wells	Philip LaZebnik	Philip LaZebnik	Penney Finkelman Cox; Sandra Rabins	Hans Zimmer (score) Stephen Schwartz (songs)	DreamWorks Pictures	—N/a	DWA Glendale; Bardel Animation Limited; Fox Animation Studios (additional final line animation); Heart of Texas Productions (additional final line animation)
The Road to El Dorado	March 31, 2000	Bibo Bergeron; Don Paul	Ted Elliott; Terry Rossio	Ted Elliott; Terry Rossio	Bonne Radford; Brook Breton	Hans Zimmer; John Powell (score) Elton John; Tim Rice (songs)	DreamWorks Pictures	—N/a	DWA Glendale; Bardel Animation Limited; Stardust Pictures; Pacific Data Images (opening "Creation" sequence)
Chicken Run (Note: Not produced, but released by DreamWorks Animation under its label.)	June 23, 2000	Peter Lord; Nick Park	Peter Lord; Nick Park	Karey Kirkpatrick	Peter Lord; David Sproxton; Nick Park	John Powell; Harry Gregson-Williams	DreamWorks Pictures	Pathé; Aardman Animations	Aardman Animations (main faculties); Framestore
Joseph: King of Dreams	November 7, 2000	Robert Ramirez; Rob LaDuca	Based on: Book of Genesis	Based on: Book of Genesis	Ken Tsumura	Daniel Pelfrey (score) John Bucchino (songs)	DreamWorks Home Entertainment	—N/a	Bardel Animation Limited; Big Fish Animation (effects); Blue Sunflower (effects); Canuck Creations (final line); Character Builders; DKP Effects Inc. (3D sequences); DWA Glendale; Dynomight Cartoons; Fil Cartoons (final line); Giant Productions (effects); Golden Bell Animation (final line); Heart of Texas Productions (final line and effects); Hits for Less (effects); Mercury Filmworks (additional paint services); New Vision Productions (final line); Ray Pang Effects (effects); Red Rover (animation and final line); Spaff Animation (effects); Starburst Animation (final line); Tama Productions (effects and animation); VirtualMagic Animation, Inc. (digital paint/compositing); Wang Film Productions (final line); Wild Horse Animation Group (final line)
Joseph: King of Dreams	November 7, 2000	Robert Ramirez; Rob LaDuca	Eugenia Bostwick-Singer; Raymond Singer; Joe Stillman; Marshall Goldberg		Ken Tsumura	Daniel Pelfrey (score) John Bucchino (songs)	DreamWorks Home Entertainment	—N/a	
Shrek	May 18, 2001	Andrew Adamson; Vicky Jenson	Based on the book by: William Steig	Based on the book by: William Steig	Aron Warner; John H. Williams; Jeffrey Katzenberg	Harry Gregson-Williams; John Powell	DreamWorks Pictures	PDI/DreamWorks	PDI/DreamWorks
Shrek	May 18, 2001	Andrew Adamson; Vicky Jenson	Ted Elliott; Terry Rossio; Joe Stillman; Roger S. H. Schulman		Aron Warner; John H. Williams; Jeffrey Katzenberg	Harry Gregson-Williams; John Powell	DreamWorks Pictures	PDI/DreamWorks	PDI/DreamWorks
Spirit: Stallion of the Cimarron	May 24, 2002	Kelly Asbury; Lorna Cook	John Fusco	John Fusco	Mireille Soria; Jeffrey Katzenberg	Hans Zimmer (score) Bryan Adams (songs)	DreamWorks Pictures	—N/a	DWA Glendale; Bardel Entertainment; Anvil Studios; Stardust Pictures
Sinbad: Legend of the Seven Seas	July 2, 2003	Tim Johnson; Patrick Gilmore	Inspired by: Sinbad the Sailor	Inspired by: Sinbad the Sailor	Mireille Soria; Jeffrey Katzenberg	Harry Gregson-Williams	DreamWorks Pictures	—N/a	DWA Glendale; Bardel Entertainment; Stardust Pictures; PDI/DreamWorks
Sinbad: Legend of the Seven Seas	July 2, 2003	Tim Johnson; Patrick Gilmore	John Logan	John Logan	Mireille Soria; Jeffrey Katzenberg	Harry Gregson-Williams	DreamWorks Pictures	—N/a	DWA Glendale; Bardel Entertainment; Stardust Pictures; PDI/DreamWorks
Shrek 2	May 19, 2004	Andrew Adamson; Kelly Asbury; Conrad Vernon	Based on the book by: William Steig	Based on the book by: William Steig	Aron Warner; David Lipman; John H. Williams	Harry Gregson-Williams	DreamWorks Pictures	PDI/DreamWorks	PDI/DreamWorks
Shrek 2	May 19, 2004	Andrew Adamson; Kelly Asbury; Conrad Vernon	Andrew Adamson	Andrew Adamson; Joe Stillman; J. David Stem; David N. Weiss	Aron Warner; David Lipman; John H. Williams	Harry Gregson-Williams	DreamWorks Pictures	PDI/DreamWorks	PDI/DreamWorks
Shark Tale	October 1, 2004	Vicky Jenson; Bibo Bergeron; Rob Letterman	Michael J. Wilson; Rob Letterman	Michael J. Wilson; Rob Letterman	Bill Damaschke; Janet Healy; Allison Lyon Segan	Hans Zimmer	DreamWorks Pictures	—N/a	DWA Glendale
Madagascar	May 27, 2005	Eric Darnell; Tom McGrath	Mark Burton; Billy Frolick; Eric Darnell; Tom McGrath	Mark Burton; Billy Frolick; Eric Darnell; Tom McGrath	Mireille Soria	Hans Zimmer	DreamWorks Pictures	PDI/DreamWorks	PDI/DreamWorks
Wallace & Gromit: The Curse of the Were-Rabbit (Note: Owned by Aardman Animations.)	October 7, 2005	Nick Park; Steve Box	Based on the characters by: Nick Park	Based on the characters by: Nick Park	Claire Jennings; Carla Shelley; Peter Lord; David Sproxton; Nick Park	Julian Nott	DreamWorks Pictures	Aardman Animations	Aardman Animations (main faculties); Moving Picture Company (visual effects)
Wallace & Gromit: The Curse of the Were-Rabbit	October 7, 2005	Nick Park; Steve Box	Steve Box; Nick Park; Mark Burton; Bob Baker	Steve Box; Nick Park; Mark Burton; Bob Baker	Claire Jennings; Carla Shelley; Peter Lord; David Sproxton; Nick Park	Julian Nott	DreamWorks Pictures	Aardman Animations	Aardman Animations (main faculties); Moving Picture Company (visual effects)
Over the Hedge	May 19, 2006	Tim Johnson; Karey Kirkpatrick	Based on the characters by: Michael Fry; T. Lewis	Based on the characters by: Michael Fry; T. Lewis	Bonnie Arnold	Rupert Gregson-Williams (score) Ben Folds (songs)	Paramount Pictures	—N/a	DWA Glendale; Pacific Data Images (uncredited)
Over the Hedge	May 19, 2006	Tim Johnson; Karey Kirkpatrick	Len Blum; Lorne Cameron; David Hoselton; Karey Kirkpatrick	Len Blum; Lorne Cameron; David Hoselton; Karey Kirkpatrick	Bonnie Arnold	Rupert Gregson-Williams (score) Ben Folds (songs)	Paramount Pictures	—N/a	DWA Glendale; Pacific Data Images (uncredited)
Flushed Away	November 3, 2006	David Bowers; Sam Fell	Sam Fell; Peter Lord; Dick Clement; Ian La Frenais	Dick Clement; Ian La Frenais; Chris Lloyd; Joe Keenan; Will Davies	Cecil Kramer; David Sproxton; Peter Lord	Harry Gregson-Williams	Paramount Pictures	Aardman Animations	Aardman Animations (main faculties); DWA Glendale
Shrek the Third	May 18, 2007	Chris Miller Co-director: Raman Hui	Based on the book by: William Steig	Based on the book by: William Steig	Aron Warner	Harry Gregson-Williams	Paramount Pictures	PDI/DreamWorks	PDI/DreamWorks
Shrek the Third	May 18, 2007	Chris Miller Co-director: Raman Hui	Andrew Adamson	Jeffrey Price; Peter S. Seaman; Chris Miller; Aron Warner	Aron Warner	Harry Gregson-Williams	Paramount Pictures	PDI/DreamWorks	PDI/DreamWorks
Bee Movie	November 2, 2007	Simon J. Smith; Steve Hickner	Jerry Seinfeld; Spike Feresten; Barry Marder; Andy Robin	Jerry Seinfeld; Spike Feresten; Barry Marder; Andy Robin	Jerry Seinfeld; Christina Steinberg	Rupert Gregson-Williams	Paramount Pictures	Columbus 81 Productions	DWA Glendale
Kung Fu Panda	June 6, 2008	John Stevenson; Mark Osborne	Ethan Reiff; Cyrus Voris	Jonathan Aibel; Glenn Berger	Melissa Cobb	Hans Zimmer; John Powell	Paramount Pictures	—N/a	DWA Glendale; James Baxter Animation (opening sequence only)
Madagascar: Escape 2 Africa	November 7, 2008	Eric Darnell; Tom McGrath	Etan Cohen; Eric Darnell; Tom McGrath	Etan Cohen; Eric Darnell; Tom McGrath	Mireille Soria; Mark Swift	Hans Zimmer (score) Hans Zimmer; Will.I.Am (songs)	Paramount Pictures	PDI/DreamWorks	PDI/DreamWorks
Monsters vs. Aliens	March 27, 2009	Conrad Vernon; Rob Letterman	Conrad Vernon; Rob Letterman	Maya Forbes; Wally Wolodarsky; Rob Letterman; Jonathan Aibel; Glenn Berger	Lisa Stewart	Henry Jackman	Paramount Pictures	—N/a	DWA Glendale
How to Train Your Dragon	March 26, 2010	Chris Sanders; Dean DeBlois	Based on the books by: Cressida Cowell	Based on the books by: Cressida Cowell	Bonnie Arnold	John Powell	Paramount Pictures	—N/a	DWA Glendale
How to Train Your Dragon	March 26, 2010	Chris Sanders; Dean DeBlois	Will Davies; Dean DeBlois; Chris Sanders	Will Davies; Dean DeBlois; Chris Sanders	Bonnie Arnold	John Powell	Paramount Pictures	—N/a	DWA Glendale
Shrek Forever After	May 21, 2010	Mike Mitchell	Based on the book by: William Steig	Based on the book by: William Steig	Gina Shay; Teresa Cheng	Harry Gregson-Williams	Paramount Pictures	—N/a	DWA Glendale
Shrek Forever After	May 21, 2010	Mike Mitchell	Josh Klausner; Darren Lemke	Josh Klausner; Darren Lemke	Gina Shay; Teresa Cheng	Harry Gregson-Williams	Paramount Pictures	—N/a	DWA Glendale
Megamind	November 5, 2010	Tom McGrath	Alan Schoolcraft; Brent Simons	Alan Schoolcraft; Brent Simons	Lara Breay; Denise Nolan Cascino	Hans Zimmer; Lorne Balfe	Paramount Pictures	PDI/DreamWorks	PDI/DreamWorks
Kung Fu Panda 2	May 26, 2011	Jennifer Yuh Nelson	Jonathan Aibel; Glenn Berger	Jonathan Aibel; Glenn Berger	Melissa Cobb	Hans Zimmer; John Powell	Paramount Pictures	—N/a	DWA Glendale
Puss in Boots	October 28, 2011	Chris Miller	Inspired by the character from: Giovanni Francesco Straparola		Joe M. Aguilar; Latifa Ouaou	Henry Jackman	Paramount Pictures	—N/a	DWA Glendale; DreamWorks Dedicated Unit
Puss in Boots	October 28, 2011	Chris Miller	Brian Lynch; Will Davies; Tom Wheeler	Tom Wheeler	Joe M. Aguilar; Latifa Ouaou	Henry Jackman	Paramount Pictures	—N/a	DWA Glendale; DreamWorks Dedicated Unit
Madagascar 3: Europe's Most Wanted	June 8, 2012	Eric Darnell; Conrad Vernon; Tom McGrath	Eric Darnell; Noah Baumbach	Eric Darnell; Noah Baumbach	Mireille Soria; Mark Swift	Hans Zimmer	Paramount Pictures	PDI/DreamWorks	PDI/DreamWorks
Rise of the Guardians	November 21, 2012	Peter Ramsey	Based on the characters by: William Joyce	Based on the characters by: William Joyce	Christina Steinberg; Nancy Bernstein	Alexandre Desplat	Paramount Pictures	—N/a	DWA Glendale
Rise of the Guardians	November 21, 2012	Peter Ramsey	David Lindsay-Abaire	David Lindsay-Abaire	Christina Steinberg; Nancy Bernstein	Alexandre Desplat	Paramount Pictures	—N/a	DWA Glendale
The Croods	March 22, 2013	Chris Sanders; Kirk DeMicco	John Cleese; Kirk DeMicco; Chris Sanders	Kirk DeMicco; Chris Sanders	Kristine Belson; Jane Hartwell	Alan Silvestri	20th Century Fox	—N/a	DWA Glendale
Turbo	July 17, 2013	David Soren	David Soren	David Soren; Darren Lemke; Robert Siegel	Lisa Stewart	Henry Jackman	20th Century Fox	—N/a	DWA Glendale
Mr. Peabody & Sherman	March 7, 2014	Rob Minkoff	Based on the characters by: Ted Key	Based on the characters by: Ted Key	Alex Schwartz; Denise Nolan Casino	Danny Elfman	20th Century Fox	PDI/DreamWorks; Bullwinkle Studios	PDI/DreamWorks; DreamWorks Dedicated Unit
Mr. Peabody & Sherman	March 7, 2014	Rob Minkoff	Craig Wright	Craig Wright	Alex Schwartz; Denise Nolan Casino	Danny Elfman	20th Century Fox	PDI/DreamWorks; Bullwinkle Studios	PDI/DreamWorks; DreamWorks Dedicated Unit
How to Train Your Dragon 2	June 13, 2014	Dean DeBlois	Based on the books by: Cressida Cowell	Based on the books by: Cressida Cowell	Bonnie Arnold	John Powell	20th Century Fox	—N/a	DWA Glendale
How to Train Your Dragon 2	June 13, 2014	Dean DeBlois	Dean DeBlois	Dean DeBlois	Bonnie Arnold	John Powell	20th Century Fox	—N/a	DWA Glendale
Penguins of Madagascar	November 26, 2014	Eric Darnell; Simon J. Smith	Alan Schoolcraft; Brent Simons; Michael Colton; John Aboud	Michael Colton; John Aboud; Brandon Sawyer	Lara Breay; Mark Swift	Lorne Balfe	20th Century Fox	PDI/DreamWorks	PDI/DreamWorks; DreamWorks Dedicated Unit
Home	March 27, 2015	Tim Johnson	Based on the book by: Adam Rex	Based on the book by: Adam Rex	Mireille Soria; Suzanne Buirgy; Chris Jenkins	Lorne Balfe; Stargate	20th Century Fox	—N/a	DWA Glendale; Pacific Data Images (production services)
Home	March 27, 2015	Tim Johnson	Tom J. Astle; Matt Ember	Tom J. Astle; Matt Ember	Mireille Soria; Suzanne Buirgy; Chris Jenkins	Lorne Balfe; Stargate	20th Century Fox	—N/a	DWA Glendale; Pacific Data Images (production services)
Kung Fu Panda 3	January 29, 2016	Jennifer Yuh Nelson; Alessandro Carloni	Jonathan Aibel; Glenn Berger	Jonathan Aibel; Glenn Berger	Melissa Cobb	Hans Zimmer	20th Century Fox	China Film Group Corporation; Zhong Ming You Ying Film; Oriental DreamWorks	DWA Glendale
Trolls	November 4, 2016	Mike Mitchell Co-director: Walt Dohrn	Based on the toys by: Thomas Dam	Based on the toys by: Thomas Dam	Gina Shay	Christophe Beck	20th Century Fox	—N/a	DWA Glendale
Trolls	November 4, 2016	Mike Mitchell Co-director: Walt Dohrn	Erica Rivinoja	Jonathan Aibel; Glenn Berger	Gina Shay	Christophe Beck	20th Century Fox	—N/a	DWA Glendale
The Boss Baby	March 31, 2017	Tom McGrath	Based on the book by: Marla Frazee	Based on the book by: Marla Frazee	Ramsey Ann Naito	Hans Zimmer; Steve Mazzaro	20th Century Fox	—N/a	DWA Glendale
The Boss Baby	March 31, 2017	Tom McGrath	Michael McCullers	Michael McCullers	Ramsey Ann Naito	Hans Zimmer; Steve Mazzaro	20th Century Fox	—N/a	DWA Glendale
Captain Underpants: The First Epic Movie	June 2, 2017	David Soren	Based on the novels by: Dav Pilkey	Based on the novels by: Dav Pilkey	Mireille Soria; Mark Swift	Theodore Shapiro	20th Century Fox	Scholastic Entertainment (uncredited)	Mikros Image; Technicolor Animation Productions
Captain Underpants: The First Epic Movie	June 2, 2017	David Soren	Nicholas Stoller	Nicholas Stoller	Mireille Soria; Mark Swift	Theodore Shapiro	20th Century Fox	Scholastic Entertainment (uncredited)	Mikros Image; Technicolor Animation Productions
How to Train Your Dragon: The Hidden World	February 22, 2019	Dean DeBlois	Based on the books by: Cressida Cowell	Based on the books by: Cressida Cowell	Bonnie Arnold; Brad Lewis	John Powell	Universal Pictures	—N/a	DWA Glendale
How to Train Your Dragon: The Hidden World	February 22, 2019	Dean DeBlois	Dean DeBlois	Dean DeBlois	Bonnie Arnold; Brad Lewis	John Powell	Universal Pictures	—N/a	DWA Glendale
Abominable	September 27, 2019	Jill Culton Co-director: Todd Wilderman	Jill Culton	Jill Culton	Suzanne Buirgy; Peilin Chou	Rupert Gregson-Williams	Universal Pictures	Pearl Studio; Zhong Ming You Ying Film	DWA Glendale
Trolls World Tour	April 10, 2020 (Note: The film was originally planned to be released theatrically in the United States on this date. However, on March 16, Universal Pictures announced that the film would be released simultaneously in drive-in theaters, as regular movie theaters closed due to the restrictions caused by the COVID-19 pandemic, and through Premium VOD in the United States, Canada, United Kingdom, South Korea and Italy. This affected the number of projections and the box office performance of the screenings. As the pandemic receded, the film was released back in regular theatres.)	Walt Dohrn Co-director: David P. Smith	Based on the toys by: Thomas Dam	Based on the toys by: Thomas Dam	Gina Shay	Theodore Shapiro	Universal Pictures	—N/a	DWA Glendale; Minimo VFX; Jellyfish Pictures
Trolls World Tour	April 10, 2020	Walt Dohrn Co-director: David P. Smith	Jonathan Aibel; Glenn Berger	Jonathan Aibel; Glenn Berger; Maya Forbes; Wally Wolodarsky; Elizabeth Tippet	Gina Shay	Theodore Shapiro	Universal Pictures	—N/a	DWA Glendale; Minimo VFX; Jellyfish Pictures
The Croods: A New Age	November 25, 2020	Joel Crawford	Kirk DeMicco; Chris Sanders	Dan Hageman; Kevin Hageman; Paul Fisher; Bob Logan	Mark Swift	Mark Mothersbaugh	Universal Pictures	—N/a	DWA Glendale
Spirit Untamed	June 4, 2021	Elaine Bogan Co-director: Ennio Torresan Jr.	Based on the characters by: John Fusco; Aury Wallington	Based on the characters by: John Fusco; Aury Wallington	Karen Foster	Amie Doherty	Universal Pictures	—N/a	Jellyfish Pictures; 88 Pictures; Minimo VFX
Spirit Untamed	June 4, 2021	Elaine Bogan Co-director: Ennio Torresan Jr.	Aury Wallington; Kristin Hahn	Aury Wallington; Kristin Hahn	Karen Foster	Amie Doherty	Universal Pictures	—N/a	Jellyfish Pictures; 88 Pictures; Minimo VFX
The Boss Baby: Family Business	July 2, 2021	Tom McGrath	Based on the books by: Marla Frazee	Based on the books by: Marla Frazee	Jeff Hermann	Hans Zimmer; Steve Mazzaro	Universal Pictures	—N/a	DWA Glendale; Jellyfish Pictures (asset production)
The Boss Baby: Family Business	July 2, 2021	Tom McGrath	Tom McGrath; Michael McCullers	Michael McCullers	Jeff Hermann	Hans Zimmer; Steve Mazzaro	Universal Pictures	—N/a	DWA Glendale; Jellyfish Pictures (asset production)
The Bad Guys	April 22, 2022	Pierre Perifel	Based on the books by: Aaron Blabey	Based on the books by: Aaron Blabey	Damon Ross; Rebecca Huntley	Daniel Pemberton	Universal Pictures	—N/a	DWA Glendale; Jellyfish Pictures (asset production)
The Bad Guys	April 22, 2022	Pierre Perifel	Etan Cohen	Etan Cohen	Damon Ross; Rebecca Huntley	Daniel Pemberton	Universal Pictures	—N/a	DWA Glendale; Jellyfish Pictures (asset production)
Puss in Boots: The Last Wish	December 21, 2022	Joel Crawford Co-director: Januel Mercado	Inspired by the character from: Giovanni Francesco Straparola		Mark Swift	Heitor Pereira	Universal Pictures	—N/a	DWA Glendale
Puss in Boots: The Last Wish	December 21, 2022	Joel Crawford Co-director: Januel Mercado	Tommy Swerdlow; Tom Wheeler	Paul Fisher; Tommy Swerdlow	Mark Swift	Heitor Pereira	Universal Pictures	—N/a	DWA Glendale
Ruby Gillman, Teenage Kraken	June 30, 2023	Kirk DeMicco Co-director: Faryn Pearl	Pam Brady; Brian C. Brown; Elliott DiGuiseppi	Pam Brady; Brian C. Brown; Elliott DiGuiseppi	Kelly Cooney Cilella	Stephanie Economou	Universal Pictures	—N/a	DWA Glendale
Trolls Band Together	November 17, 2023	Walt Dohrn Co-director: Tim Heitz	Based on the toys by: Thomas Dam	Based on the toys by: Thomas Dam	Gina Shay	Theodore Shapiro	Universal Pictures	—N/a	DWA Glendale; Titmouse, Inc. (2D sequences only); DNEG
Trolls Band Together	November 17, 2023	Walt Dohrn Co-director: Tim Heitz	Elizabeth Tippet	Elizabeth Tippet	Gina Shay	Theodore Shapiro	Universal Pictures	—N/a	DWA Glendale; Titmouse, Inc. (2D sequences only); DNEG
Orion and the Dark	February 2, 2024	Sean Charmatz	Based on the book by: Emma Yarlett	Based on the book by: Emma Yarlett	Peter McCown	Kevin Lax; Robert Lydecker	Netflix	—N/a	Mikros Animation; Jungler
Orion and the Dark	February 2, 2024	Sean Charmatz	Charlie Kaufman	Charlie Kaufman	Peter McCown	Kevin Lax; Robert Lydecker	Netflix	—N/a	Mikros Animation; Jungler
Kung Fu Panda 4	March 8, 2024	Mike Mitchell Co-director: Stephanie Ma Stine	Jonathan Aibel; Glenn Berger; Darren Lemke	Jonathan Aibel; Glenn Berger; Darren Lemke	Rebecca Huntley	Hans Zimmer; Steve Mazzaro	Universal Pictures	—N/a	DWA Glendale; Jellyfish Pictures (asset production)
The Wild Robot	September 27, 2024	Chris Sanders	Based on the books by: Peter Brown	Based on the books by: Peter Brown	Jeff Hermann	Kris Bowers	Universal Pictures	—N/a	DWA Glendale; Stim Studio (additional character rigging)
The Wild Robot	September 27, 2024	Chris Sanders	Chris Sanders	Chris Sanders	Jeff Hermann	Kris Bowers	Universal Pictures	—N/a	DWA Glendale; Stim Studio (additional character rigging)
Dog Man	January 31, 2025	Peter Hastings	Based on the books by: Dav Pilkey	Based on the books by: Dav Pilkey	Karen Foster	Tom Howe	Universal Pictures	Scholastic Entertainment (uncredited)	Jellyfish Pictures; Minimo VFX (rigging services)
Dog Man	January 31, 2025	Peter Hastings	Peter Hastings	Peter Hastings	Karen Foster	Tom Howe	Universal Pictures	Scholastic Entertainment (uncredited)	Jellyfish Pictures; Minimo VFX (rigging services)
How to Train Your Dragon (Note: Live-action production) (Note: Combines live-action with animation)	June 13, 2025	Dean DeBlois	Based on How to Train Your Dragon by: Chris Sanders; Dean DeBlois; William Davies		Marc Platt; Adam Siegel	John Powell	Universal Pictures	Marc Platt Productions	Framestore (visual effects)
How to Train Your Dragon	June 13, 2025	Dean DeBlois	Dean DeBlois	Dean DeBlois	Marc Platt; Adam Siegel	John Powell	Universal Pictures	Marc Platt Productions	Framestore (visual effects)
The Bad Guys 2	August 1, 2025	Pierre Perifel Co-director: JP Sans	Based on the books by: Aaron Blabey	Based on the books by: Aaron Blabey	Damon Ross	Daniel Pemberton	Universal Pictures	—N/a	DWA Glendale; Sony Pictures Imageworks
The Bad Guys 2	August 1, 2025	Pierre Perifel Co-director: JP Sans	Yoni Brenner; Etan Cohen	Yoni Brenner; Etan Cohen	Damon Ross	Daniel Pemberton	Universal Pictures	—N/a	DWA Glendale; Sony Pictures Imageworks
Gabby's Dollhouse: The Movie	September 26, 2025	Ryan Crego	Based on the television series by: Traci Paige Johnson; Jennifer Twomey		Steven Schweickart	Stephanie Economou	Universal Pictures	—N/a	CGCG Inc. Assemblage Entertainment; FX3X (visual effects)
Gabby's Dollhouse: The Movie	September 26, 2025	Ryan Crego	Ryan Crego	Mike Lew; Rehana Lew Mirza; Adam Wilson; Melanie Wilson LaBracio	Steven Schweickart	Stephanie Economou	Universal Pictures	—N/a	CGCG Inc. Assemblage Entertainment; FX3X (visual effects)
Forgotten Island	September 25, 2026	Joel Crawford; Januel Mercado	Joel Crawford; Januel Mercado	Joel Crawford; Januel Mercado	Mark Swift	Nathan Matthew David	Universal Pictures	—N/a	DWA Glendale; Snipple Animation Studios (2D sequences only); Sony Pictures Imageworks

=== Upcoming ===
Film	Release date	Director(s)	Writer(s)		Producer(s)	Composer(s)	Distributor	Co-production with	Animation/production service(s)	Production status	Ref(s)
Film	Release date	Director(s)	Story	Screenplay	Producer(s)	Composer(s)	Distributor	Co-production with	Animation/production service(s)	Production status	Ref(s)
CoComelon: The Movie	February 19, 2027	Kathleen Thorson Good	Adam Pava	Adam Pava	TBA	TBA	Universal Pictures	Moonbug Entertainment; Flywheel Media; Prime Focus Studios	DNEG Animation	In production	
How To Train Your Dragon 2	June 11, 2027	Dean DeBlois	Based on How to Train Your Dragon by: Chris Sanders; Dean DeBlois; William Davies		Marc Platt; Dean DeBlois; Adam Siegel	John Powell	Universal Pictures	Marc Platt Productions	Framestore (visual effects)	Post-production	
How To Train Your Dragon 2	June 11, 2027	Dean DeBlois	Dean DeBlois	Dean DeBlois	Marc Platt; Dean DeBlois; Adam Siegel	John Powell	Universal Pictures	Marc Platt Productions	Framestore (visual effects)	Post-production	
Shrek 5	June 30, 2027	Conrad Vernon; Walt Dohrn Co-director: Brad Ableson	Based on the book by: William Steig	Based on the book by: William Steig	Chris Meledandri; Gina Shay	TBA	Universal Pictures	—N/a	DWA Glendale	Completed	
Shrek 5	June 30, 2027	Conrad Vernon; Walt Dohrn Co-director: Brad Ableson	Michael McCullers	Michael McCullers	Chris Meledandri; Gina Shay	TBA	Universal Pictures	—N/a	DWA Glendale	Completed	
Untitled film	September 24, 2027	TBA	TBA	TBA	TBA	TBA	Universal Pictures	—N/a	TBA	In development	
Donkey	June 30, 2028	Charlie Bean Co-director: Matt Flynn	TBA	TBA	Rebecca Huntley	TBA	Universal Pictures	—N/a	TBA	In development	
Untitled film	September 22, 2028	TBA	TBA	TBA	TBA	TBA	Universal Pictures	—N/a	TBA	In development	

=== In development ===
Title	Notes
The Bad Guys 3	
The Boss Baby 3	
Kung Fu Panda 5	
Madagascar 4	
The Wild Robot Escapes	
Untitled Dog Man sequel	
Untitled Lil Dicky film	

== Television specials ==
Title	Release date	Director(s)	Distribution/co-production with	Network
Shrek the Halls	November 28, 2007	Gary Trousdale	PDI/DreamWorks	ABC
Monsters vs. Aliens: Mutant Pumpkins from Outer Space	October 28, 2009	Peter Ramsey	NBCUniversal Television Distribution	NBC
Merry Madagascar	November 17, 2009	David Soren	NBCUniversal Television Distribution; Pacific Data Images	NBC
Scared Shrekless	October 28, 2010	Gary Trousdale; Raman Hui	NBCUniversal Television Distribution; Pacific Data Images	NBC
Kung Fu Panda Holiday	November 24, 2010	Tim Johnson	NBCUniversal Television Distribution	NBC
Dragons: Gift of the Night Fury	November 15, 2011	Tom Owens	Paramount Home Entertainment	Direct-to-video
Madly Madagascar	January 29, 2013	David Soren	20th Century Fox Home Entertainment; Pacific Data Images	Direct-to-video
Trolls Holiday	November 24, 2017	Joel Crawford	NBCUniversal Television Distribution	NBC
How to Train Your Dragon: Homecoming	December 3, 2019	Tim Johnson	NBCUniversal Television Distribution; Jellyfish Pictures; Minimo VFX	NBC
Trolls: Holiday in Harmony	November 26, 2021	Sean Charmatz; Tim Heitz	NBCUniversal Television Distribution	NBC

== Short films ==
Title	Release date	Distribution/co-production with	Release with	Notes
Shrek in the Swamp Karaoke Dance Party	November 2, 2001	DreamWorks Home Entertainment; PDI/DreamWorks	Shrek	Home video release
Shrek 4-D/The Ghost of Lord Farquaad	May 22, 2003	Universal Parks & Resorts (parks); DreamWorks Home Entertainment (DVD); PDI/DreamWorks	Theme park ride at Universal Studios Hollywood	
Cyclops Island	November 18, 2003	DreamWorks Home Entertainment	Sinbad: Legend of the Seven Seas	Home video release
Far Far Away Idol	November 5, 2004	DreamWorks Home Entertainment; PDI/DreamWorks	Shrek 2	Home video release
Club Oscar	February 8, 2005	DreamWorks Home Entertainment	Shark Tale	Home video release
The Madagascar Penguins in a Christmas Caper	October 7, 2005	DreamWorks Pictures; PDI/DreamWorks	Wallace & Gromit: The Curse of the Were-Rabbit	Theatrical release
First Flight	May 19, 2006	Paramount Pictures	Over the Hedge	Theatrical release
Hammy's Boomerang Adventure	October 17, 2006	Paramount Home Entertainment	Over the Hedge	Home video release
Secrets of the Furious Five	November 9, 2008	Paramount Home Entertainment; Reel FX Creative Studios; Film Roman	Kung Fu Panda	Home video release
B.O.B.'s Big Break	September 29, 2009	Paramount Home Entertainment	Monsters vs. Aliens	Home video release
Legend of the Boneknapper Dragon	October 15, 2010	Paramount Home Entertainment; Duncan Studio (2D sequences)	How to Train Your Dragon	Home video release
Donkey's Caroling Christmas-tacular	December 7, 2010	Paramount Home Entertainment	Shrek Forever After	Home video release
Megamind: The Button of Doom	February 25, 2011	Paramount Home Entertainment; Pacific Data Images	Megamind	Home video release
Thriller Night	September 13, 2011	Paramount Home Entertainment	Scared Shrekless	Home video release
The Pig Who Cried Werewolf	October 3, 2011	Paramount Home Entertainment	Scared Shrekless	Home video release
Night of the Living Carrots	October 12, 2011	Paramount Home Entertainment	Scared Shrekless	Home video release
Book of Dragons	November 15, 2011	Paramount Home Entertainment; Renegade Animation	Dragons: Gift of the Night Fury	Home video release
Kung Fu Panda: Secrets of the Masters	December 13, 2011	Paramount Home Entertainment; Duncan Studio	Kung Fu Panda 2	Home video release
Puss in Boots: The Three Diablos	February 24, 2012	Paramount Home Entertainment	Puss in Boots	Home video release
Almost Home	March 7, 2014	20th Century Fox	Mr. Peabody & Sherman	Theatrical release
Rocky and Bullwinkle	October 14, 2014	20th Century Fox Home Entertainment; Pacific Data Images; Bullwinkle Studios	Mr. Peabody & Sherman	Home video release
Dawn of the Dragon Racers	November 11, 2014	20th Century Fox Home Entertainment	How to Train Your Dragon 2	Home video release
Kung Fu Panda: Secrets of the Scroll	December 14, 2015	20th Century Fox Home Entertainment; Yowza! Animation	Kung Fu Panda	Home video release
Panda Paws	May 15, 2016	20th Century Fox Home Entertainment	Kung Fu Panda 3	Home video release
Kung Fu Panda: Unstoppable Awesomeness	December 15, 2016	—N/a	Theme park ride at Motiongate	Short was edited and re-used in DreamWorks Theatre
The Boss Baby and Tim's Treasure Hunt Through Time	July 4, 2017	20th Century Fox Home Entertainment	The Boss Baby	Home video release
Bird Karma	February 23, 2018	Universal Pictures	The Boss Baby	Theatrical release (Japan only)
Kung Fu Panda: The Emperor's Quest	June 15, 2018	Universal Pictures	Theme park ride at Universal Studios Hollywood	
Bilby	June 16, 2018	Universal Pictures	Screened at the Annecy International Animation Film Festival	Theatrical release
Marooned	September 27, 2019	Universal Pictures	Included in physical releases of Abominable	Home video release
Show and Tell	December 17, 2019	Universal Pictures Home Entertainment; Pearl Studio	Included in physical releases of Abominable	Home video release
Tiny Diamond Goes Back to School	July 7, 2020	Universal Pictures Home Entertainment	Included in physical releases of Trolls World Tour	Home video release
To: Gerard	December 17, 2020	Universal Pictures	Included in physical releases of The Croods: A New Age	Home video release/Peacock
Family Movie Night: Little Red Bronana Bread	February 23, 2021	Universal Pictures Home Entertainment	Included in physical releases of The Croods: A New Age	Home video release
Dear Diary: World's First Pranks	February 23, 2021	Universal Pictures Home Entertainment	Included in physical releases of The Croods: A New Age	Home video release
Precious Templeton: A Pony Tale	September 14, 2021	Universal Pictures Home Entertainment	Included in physical releases of The Boss Baby: Family Business	Home video release
The Bad Guys in Maraschino Ruby	June 21, 2022	Universal Pictures Home Entertainment	Included in physical releases of The Bad Guys	Home video release
Puss in Boots: The Trident	February 28, 2023	Universal Pictures Home Entertainment	Included in physical releases of Puss in Boots: The Last Wish	Home video release
It Takes Three	January 16, 2024	Universal Pictures Home Entertainment	Included in physical releases of Trolls Band Together	Home video release
Dueling Dumplings	April 9, 2024	Universal Pictures Home Entertainment	Included in physical releases of Kung Fu Panda 4	Home video release
The Bad Guys: Little Lies and Alibis	January 31, 2025	Universal Pictures	Dog Man; Later included in physical releases of The Bad Guys 2	Theatrical release
Wednesdays with Gramps	June 15, 2025	Universal Pictures	Screened at the American Black Film Festival	Theatrical release

^{AMC} The films that were screened as part of DreamWorks Animation Week were: Shrek, Madagascar, Kung Fu Panda, How to Train Your Dragon, The Croods, and Trolls.

== Related productions ==
Title	Release date	Director(s)	Writer(s)		Producer(s)	Composer(s)	Studio(s)	Animation/production service(s)	Notes
Title	Release date	Director(s)	Story	Screenplay	Producer(s)	Composer(s)	Studio(s)	Animation/production service(s)	Notes
CyberWorld	October 6, 2000	Colin Davies; Elaine Despins	Hugh Murray; Todd Alcott; Additional story work: Mark Smith	Charlie Rubin; Steve Hoban; Jimmy Savile; Hugh Murray	Steve Hoban; Hugh Murray	Paul Haslinger; Hummie Mann	20th Century Fox; IMAX Corporation; Intel; EyeTide Media; ZeoCast; IMAX Sandde Animation; Spin Entertainment; Consolidated Film Industries; Pacific Data Images (Antz and Homer³ segment)	Pacific Data Images (Antz and Homer³ segment)	—N/a
Trollhunters: Rise of the Titans	July 21, 2021	Johane Matte; Francisco Ruiz Velasco; Andrew Schmidt	Based on the characters by: Guillermo del Toro; Daniel Kraus		Guillermo del Toro; Chad Hammes; Marc Guggenheim; Dan Hageman; Kevin Hageman	Jeff Danna	Netflix; DreamWorks Animation Television; Double Dare You Productions	88 Pictures; CGCG Inc. Original Force	Television film that serves as the conclusion to the Tales of Arcadia franchise.
Trollhunters: Rise of the Titans	July 21, 2021	Johane Matte; Francisco Ruiz Velasco; Andrew Schmidt	Guillermo del Toro; Marc Guggenheim; Dan Hageman; Kevin Hageman		Guillermo del Toro; Chad Hammes; Marc Guggenheim; Dan Hageman; Kevin Hageman	Jeff Danna	Netflix; DreamWorks Animation Television; Double Dare You Productions	88 Pictures; CGCG Inc. Original Force	Television film that serves as the conclusion to the Tales of Arcadia franchise.
Chicken Run: Dawn of the Nugget	December 15, 2023	Sam Fell	Karey Kirkpatrick; John O'Farrell	Karey Kirkpatrick; John O'Farrell; Rachel Tunnard	Steve Pegram; Leyla Hobart	Harry Gregson-Williams	Netflix; Aardman Animations	—N/a	Feature film sequel to Chicken Run.
Megamind vs. the Doom Syndicate	March 1, 2024	Eric Fogel	Alan Schoolcraft; Brent Simons		—N/a	Matthew Janszen; Bryan Winslow	Peacock; DreamWorks Animation Television	88 Pictures; Doberman Pictures	Television film sequel to Megamind.
Wallace & Gromit: Vengeance Most Fowl	December 25, 2024	Nick Park; Merlin Crossingham	Mark Burton; Nick Park	Mark Burton	Richard Beek	Lorne Balfe; Julian Nott	BBC; Netflix; Aardman Animations	—N/a	Feature film sequel to Wallace & Gromit: The Curse of the Were-Rabbit.

== Miscellaneous work ==
- 74th Academy Awards (2002) (Animation for the characters of Shrek and Donkey in the audience during the award for Best Animated Feature)

== Reception ==
=== Box office grosses ===
Film	Budget	North America		Overseas gross	Worldwide gross (unadjusted)	Ref(s)
Film	Budget	Opening	Gross (unadjusted)	Overseas gross	Worldwide gross (unadjusted)	Ref(s)
Antz	$42–105 million	$17,195,160	$90,757,863	$81,000,000	$171,757,863	
The Prince of Egypt	$60–100 million	$14,524,321	$101,413,188	$117,200,000	$218,613,188	
The Road to El Dorado	$95 million	$12,846,652	$50,863,742	$25,568,985	$76,432,727	
Chicken Run	$45 million	$17,506,162	$106,834,564	$118,000,000	$224,834,564	
Shrek	$60 million	$42,347,760	$268,349,831	$220,279,678	$488,629,509	
Spirit: Stallion of the Cimarron	$80 million	$17,770,036	$73,280,117	$49,283,422	$122,563,539	
Sinbad: Legend of the Seven Seas	$60 million	$6,874,477	$26,483,452	$54,289,625	$80,773,077	
Shrek 2	$150 million	$108,037,878	$444,854,717	$487,536,387	$932,406,549	
Shark Tale	$75 million	$47,604,606	$160,861,908	$213,721,971	$374,583,879	
Madagascar	$75 million	$47,224,594	$193,595,521	$348,468,325	$542,063,846	
Wallace & Gromit: The Curse of the Were-Rabbit	$30 million	$16,025,987	$56,110,897	$136,594,394	$192,705,291	
Over the Hedge	$80 million	$38,457,003	$155,019,340	$184,776,550	$339,795,890	
Flushed Away	$149 million	$18,814,323	$64,665,672	$113,615,882	$178,281,554	
Shrek the Third	$160 million	$121,629,270	$322,719,944	$485,586,147	$813,367,380	
Bee Movie	$150 million	$38,021,044	$126,631,277	$166,883,059	$293,514,336	
Kung Fu Panda	$130 million	$60,239,130	$215,434,591	$416,309,969	$631,744,560	
Madagascar: Escape 2 Africa	$150 million	$63,106,589	$180,010,950	$423,889,404	$603,900,354	
Monsters vs. Aliens	$175 million	$59,321,095	$198,351,526	$183,158,344	$381,509,870	
How to Train Your Dragon (2010)	$165 million	$43,732,319	$217,581,231	$277,297,528	$494,878,759	
Shrek Forever After	$135–165 million	$70,838,207	$238,736,787	$513,864,080	$752,600,867	
Megamind	$130 million	$46,016,833	$148,415,853	$173,469,912	$321,885,765	
Kung Fu Panda 2	$150 million	$47,656,302	$165,249,063	$500,443,218	$665,692,281	
Puss in Boots	$130 million	$34,077,439	$149,260,504	$405,726,973	$554,987,477	
Madagascar 3: Europe's Most Wanted	$145 million	$60,316,738	$216,391,482	$530,529,792	$746,921,274	
Rise of the Guardians	$145 million	$23,773,465	$103,412,758	$203,528,912	$306,941,670	
The Croods	$135–175 million	$43,639,736	$187,168,425	$400,036,243	$587,204,668	
Turbo	$127–135 million	$21,312,625	$83,028,128	$199,542,554	$282,570,682	
Mr. Peabody & Sherman	$145 million	$32,207,057	$111,506,430	$164,191,609	$275,698,039	
How to Train Your Dragon 2	$145 million	$49,451,322	$177,002,924	$444,534,595	$621,537,519	
Penguins of Madagascar	$132 million	$25,447,444	$83,850,911	$289,664,710	$373,515,621	
Home	$135 million	$52,107,731	$177,397,510	$208,644,097	$386,041,607	
Kung Fu Panda 3	$145 million	$41,282,042	$143,528,619	$377,642,206	$521,170,825	
Trolls	$125 million	$46,581,142	$153,707,064	$193,157,398	$347,013,487	
The Boss Baby	$125 million	$50,198,902	$175,003,033	$352,962,903	$527,965,936	
Captain Underpants: The First Epic Movie	$38 million	$23,851,539	$73,921,000	$51,506,681	$125,427,681	
How to Train Your Dragon: The Hidden World	$129 million	$55,022,245	$160,799,505	$361,000,000	$521,799,505	
Abominable	$75 million	$20,612,100	$61,270,390	$129,034,382	$190,304,772	
Trolls World Tour	$90–110 million	—N/a	$450,000	$48,826,818	$49,276,818	
The Croods: A New Age	$65 million	$9,724,200	$58,568,815	$157,337,000	$215,905,815	
Spirit Untamed	$30 million	$6,101,050	$17,716,215	$25,001,000	$42,717,215	
The Boss Baby: Family Business	$82 million	$16,000,665	$57,300,280	$89,445,000	$146,745,280	
The Bad Guys	$69–80 million	$23,950,245	$97,459,240	$152,928,648	$250,387,888	
Puss in Boots: The Last Wish	$90–110 million	$12,429,515	$186,090,535	$295,667,128	$481,757,663	
Ruby Gillman, Teenage Kraken	$70 million	$5,500,990	$15,753,600	$29,904,145	$45,657,745	
Trolls Band Together	$95 million	$30,002,525	$102,996,915	$106,375,875	$209,372,790	
Kung Fu Panda 4	$85 million	$57,989,905	$193,590,620	$354,098,872	$547,689,492	
The Wild Robot	$78 million	$35,790,150	$143,182,115	$181,109,000	$324,291,115	
Dog Man	$40 million	$47,519,946	$97,970,355	$33,366,528	$145,490,301	
How to Train Your Dragon (2025)	$150 million	$84,633,315	$224,001,000	$292,939,000	$516,940,000	
The Bad Guys 2	$80 million	$21,995,715	$80,388,790	$127,611,128	$207,999,918	
Gabby's Dollhouse: The Movie	$32 million	$13,697,595	$32,011,820	$48,837,797	$80,849,617	
Forgotten Island	$80 million	$13,007,005	$37,777,295	$39,705,125	$77,482,420	

=== Critical and public response ===
Film	Critical		Public
Film	Rotten Tomatoes	Metacritic	CinemaScore
Antz	92% (87 reviews)	73 (26 reviews)	B+
The Prince of Egypt	78% (87 reviews)	64 (26 reviews)	A
The Road to El Dorado	49% (103 reviews)	51 (29 reviews)	B+
Chicken Run	97% (169 reviews)	88 (34 reviews)	A−
Shrek	89% (214 reviews)	84 (34 reviews)	A
Spirit: Stallion of the Cimarron	69% (121 reviews)	52 (29 reviews)	A
Sinbad: Legend of the Seven Seas	46% (122 reviews)	48 (33 reviews)	A−
Shrek 2	89% (234 reviews)	75 (40 reviews)	A
Shark Tale	34% (176 reviews)	48 (36 reviews)	A−
Madagascar	56% (185 reviews)	57 (36 reviews)	A−
Wallace & Gromit: The Curse of the Were-Rabbit	95% (180 reviews)	87 (38 reviews)	B+
Over the Hedge	75% (170 reviews)	67 (31 reviews)	A
Flushed Away	73% (136 reviews)	74 (28 reviews)	B+
Shrek the Third	41% (209 reviews)	58 (35 reviews)	B+
Bee Movie	49% (168 reviews)	54 (34 reviews)	B+
Kung Fu Panda	87% (189 reviews)	74 (36 reviews)	A−
Madagascar: Escape 2 Africa	64% (153 reviews)	61 (25 reviews)	A−
Monsters vs. Aliens	73% (215 reviews)	56 (35 reviews)	A−
How to Train Your Dragon (2010)	99% (208 reviews)	75 (37 reviews)	A
Shrek Forever After	58% (195 reviews)	58 (35 reviews)	A
Megamind	73% (178 reviews)	63 (33 reviews)	A−
Kung Fu Panda 2	82% (185 reviews)	67 (34 reviews)	A
Puss in Boots	85% (150 reviews)	65 (24 reviews)	A−
Madagascar 3: Europe's Most Wanted	77% (127 reviews)	60 (26 reviews)	A
Rise of the Guardians	75% (159 reviews)	58 (37 reviews)	A
The Croods	71% (142 reviews)	55 (30 reviews)	A
Turbo	68% (112 reviews)	58 (30 reviews)	A
Mr. Peabody & Sherman	81% (138 reviews)	59 (34 reviews)	A
How to Train Your Dragon 2	92% (184 reviews)	77 (48 reviews)	A
Penguins of Madagascar	74% (115 reviews)	53 (31 reviews)	A−
Home	53% (137 reviews)	55 (31 reviews)	A
Kung Fu Panda 3	87% (178 reviews)	66 (34 reviews)	A
Trolls	76% (161 reviews)	55 (32 reviews)	A
The Boss Baby	53% (178 reviews)	50 (32 reviews)	A−
Captain Underpants: The First Epic Movie	87% (134 reviews)	69 (25 reviews)	B+
How to Train Your Dragon: The Hidden World	90% (271 reviews)	71 (42 reviews)	A
Abominable	83% (170 reviews)	61 (28 reviews)	A
Trolls World Tour	72% (160 reviews)	51 (36 reviews)	—N/a
The Croods: A New Age	76% (157 reviews)	56 (30 reviews)	A
Spirit Untamed	48% (115 reviews)	49 (23 reviews)	A
The Boss Baby: Family Business	47% (101 reviews)	39 (20 reviews)	A
The Bad Guys	87% (174 reviews)	64 (26 reviews)	A
Puss in Boots: The Last Wish	95% (196 reviews)	73 (29 reviews)	A
Ruby Gillman, Teenage Kraken	65% (105 reviews)	50 (27 reviews)	A−
Trolls Band Together	64% (88 reviews)	53 (13 reviews)	A
Orion and the Dark	91% (77 reviews)	72 (23 reviews)	—N/a
Kung Fu Panda 4	71% (164 reviews)	54 (33 reviews)	A–
The Wild Robot	97% (261 reviews)	85 (46 reviews)	A
Dog Man	82% (105 reviews)	66 (22 reviews)	A
How to Train Your Dragon (2025)	78% (258 reviews)	61 (43 reviews)	A
The Bad Guys 2	88% (115 reviews)	64 (23 reviews)	A
Gabby's Dollhouse: The Movie	85% (26 reviews)	46 (4 reviews)	A+
Forgotten Island	95% (131 reviews)	74 (30 reviews)	A

== Accolades ==
=== Academy Awards ===
Year	Film	Category	Recipient(s)	Result
1998	The Prince of Egypt	Best Original Score	Hans Zimmer	Nominated
1998	The Prince of Egypt	Best Original Song	"When You Believe"	Won
2001	Shrek	Best Adapted Screenplay	Ted Elliott, Terry Rossio, Joe Stillman and Roger S. H. Schulman	Nominated
2001	Shrek	Best Animated Feature	Aron Warner	Won
2002	Spirit: Stallion of the Cimarron	Best Animated Feature	Jeffrey Katzenberg	Nominated
2004	Shark Tale	Best Animated Feature	Bill Damaschke	Nominated
2004	Shrek 2	Best Animated Feature	Andrew Adamson	Nominated
2004	Shrek 2	Best Original Song	"Accidentally in Love"	Nominated
2005	Wallace & Gromit: The Curse of the Were-Rabbit	Best Animated Feature	Nick Park and Steve Box	Won
2008	Kung Fu Panda	Best Animated Feature	John Stevenson and Mark Osborne	Nominated
2010	How to Train Your Dragon	Best Animated Feature	Chris Sanders and Dean DeBlois	Nominated
2010	How to Train Your Dragon	Best Original Score	John Powell	Nominated
2011	Kung Fu Panda 2	Best Animated Feature	Jennifer Yuh Nelson	Nominated
2011	Puss in Boots	Best Animated Feature	Chris Miller	Nominated
2013	The Croods	Best Animated Feature	Chris Sanders, Kirk DeMicco and Kristine Belson	Nominated
2014	How to Train Your Dragon 2	Best Animated Feature	Dean DeBlois and Bonnie Arnold	Nominated
2016	Trolls	Best Original Song	"Can't Stop the Feeling!"	Nominated
2017	The Boss Baby	Best Animated Feature	Tom McGrath and Ramsey Ann Naito	Nominated
2019	How to Train Your Dragon: The Hidden World	Best Animated Feature	Dean DeBlois, Brad Lewis and Bonnie Arnold	Nominated
2022	Puss in Boots: The Last Wish	Best Animated Feature	Joel Crawford and Mark Swift	Nominated
2024	The Wild Robot	Best Animated Feature	Chris Sanders and Jeff Hermann	Nominated
2024	The Wild Robot	Best Original Score	Kris Bowers	Nominated
2024	The Wild Robot	Best Sound	Randy Thom, Brian Chumney, Gary A. Rizzo and Leff Lefferts	Nominated

=== Golden Globe Awards ===
Year	Film	Category	Recipient(s)	Result
1998	The Prince of Egypt	Best Original Score	Hans Zimmer	Nominated
1998	The Prince of Egypt	Best Original Song	"When You Believe"	Nominated
2000	Chicken Run	Best Motion Picture – Musical or Comedy	Nick Park and Peter Lord	Nominated
2001	Shrek	Best Motion Picture – Musical or Comedy	Andrew Adamson and Vicky Jenson	Nominated
2002	Spirit: Stallion of the Cimarron	Best Original Song	"Here I Am"	Nominated
2004	Shrek 2	Best Original Song	"Accidentally in Love"	Nominated
2007	Bee Movie	Best Animated Feature Film	Steve Hickner and Simon J. Smith	Nominated
2008	Kung Fu Panda	Best Animated Feature Film	Mark Osborne and John Stevenson	Nominated
2010	How to Train Your Dragon	Best Animated Feature Film	Chris Sanders and Dean DeBlois	Nominated
2011	Puss in Boots	Best Animated Feature Film	Chris Miller	Nominated
2012	Rise of the Guardians	Best Animated Feature Film	Peter Ramsey	Nominated
2013	The Croods	Best Animated Feature Film	Chris Sanders, Kirk DeMicco and Kristine Belson	Nominated
2014	How to Train Your Dragon 2	Best Animated Feature Film	Dean DeBlois and Bonnie Arnold	Won
2016	Trolls	Best Original Song	"Can't Stop the Feeling!"	Nominated
2017	The Boss Baby	Best Animated Feature Film	Tom McGrath and Ramsey Ann Naito	Nominated
2019	How to Train Your Dragon: The Hidden World	Best Animated Feature Film	Dean DeBlois, Brad Lewis and Bonnie Arnold	Nominated
2020	The Croods: A New Age	Best Animated Feature Film	Joel Crawford and Mark Swift	Nominated
2022	Puss in Boots: The Last Wish	Best Animated Feature Film	Joel Crawford and Mark Swift	Nominated
2024	The Wild Robot	Best Animated Feature Film	Chris Sanders	Nominated
2024	The Wild Robot	Cinematic and Box Office Achievement	Jeff Hermann	Nominated
2024	The Wild Robot	Best Original Song	"Kiss the Sky"	Nominated
2024	The Wild Robot	Best Original Score	Kris Bowers	Nominated

=== Annie Awards ===
Year	Film	Category	Recipient(s)	Result
1999	The Prince of Egypt	Best Animated Feature	Penney Finkelman Cox and Sandra Rabins	Nominated
2000	Chicken Run	Best Animated Feature	Peter Lord, Nick Park and David Sproxton	Nominated
2000	The Road to El Dorado	Best Animated Feature	Brook Breton and Bonne Radford	Nominated
2001	Shrek	Best Animated Feature	Jeffrey Katzenberg, Aron Warner and John H. Williams	Won
2002	Spirit: Stallion of the Cimarron	Best Animated Feature	Max Howard, Jeffrey Katzenberg and Mireille Soria	Nominated
2004	Shrek 2	Best Animated Feature	Aron Warner, David Lipman and John H. Williams	Nominated
2005	Wallace & Gromit: The Curse of the Were-Rabbit	Best Animated Feature	Nick Park, Claire Jennings, Peter Lord, Carla Shelley and David Sproxton	Won
2005	Madagascar	Best Animated Feature	Mireille Soria	Nominated
2006	Over the Hedge	Best Animated Feature	Bonnie Arnold	Nominated
2007	Bee Movie	Best Animated Feature	Jerry Seinfeld, Christina Steinberg and Cameron Stevning	Nominated
2008	Kung Fu Panda	Best Animated Feature	Melissa Cobb	Won
2010	How to Train Your Dragon	Best Animated Feature	Bonnie Arnold	Won
2011	Kung Fu Panda 2	Best Animated Feature	Melissa Cobb	Nominated
2011	Puss in Boots	Best Animated Feature	Latifa Ouaou and Joe M. Aguilar	Nominated
2012	Rise of the Guardians	Best Animated Feature	Christina Steinberg and Nancy Bernstein	Nominated
2013	The Croods	Best Animated Feature	Kristine Belson	Nominated
2014	How to Train Your Dragon 2	Best Animated Feature	Bonnie Arnold	Won
2016	Kung Fu Panda 3	Best Animated Feature	Melissa Cobb	Nominated
2017	The Boss Baby	Best Animated Feature	Ramsey Ann Naito	Nominated
2017	Captain Underpants: The First Epic Movie	Best Animated Feature	Mireille Soria and Mark Swift	Nominated
2019	How to Train Your Dragon: The Hidden World	Best Animated Feature	Bonnie Arnold and Brad Lewis	Nominated
2020	The Croods: A New Age	Best Animated Feature	Mark Swift	Nominated
2020	Trolls World Tour	Best Animated Feature	Gina Shay	Nominated
2022	Puss in Boots: The Last Wish	Best Animated Feature	Mark Swift	Nominated
2024	Kung Fu Panda 4	Best Animated Feature	Rebecca Huntley	Nominated
2024	The Wild Robot	Best Animated Feature	Jeff Hermann	Won

=== British Academy Film Awards ===
Year	Film	Category	Recipient(s)	Result
2000	Chicken Run	Best British Film	Peter Lord and David Sproxton	Nominated
2000	Chicken Run	Best Visual Effects	Paddy Eason, Mark Nelmes, and Dave Alex Riddett	Nominated
2001	Shrek	Best Film	Jeffrey Katzenberg, Aron Warner and John H. Williams	Nominated
2001	Shrek	Best Supporting Actor	Eddie Murphy	Nominated
2001	Shrek	Best Adapted Screenplay	Ted Elliott, Terry Rossio, Joe Stillman and Roger S.H. Schulman	Won
2001	Shrek	Best Original Music	Harry Gregson-Williams and John Powell	Nominated
2001	Shrek	Best Sound	Andy Nelson, Anna Behlmer, Wylie Stateman, and Lon Bender	Nominated
2001	Shrek	Best Visual Effects	Ken Bielenberg	Nominated
2005	Wallace & Gromit: The Curse of the Were-Rabbit	Best British Film	Claire Jennings, David Sproxton and Bob Baker	Won
2006	Flushed Away	Best Animated Film	David Bowers and Sam Fell	Nominated
2007	Shrek the Third	Best Animated Film	Chris Miller and Raman Hui	Nominated
2010	How to Train Your Dragon	Best Animated Film	Chris Sanders and Dean DeBlois	Nominated
2010	How to Train Your Dragon	Best Original Music	John Powell	Nominated
2022	Puss in Boots: The Last Wish	Best Animated Film	Joel Crawford and Mark Swift	Nominated
2024	The Wild Robot	Best Animated Film	Chris Sanders and Jeff Hermann	Nominated
2024	The Wild Robot	Best Children's & Family Film	Chris Sanders and Jeff Hermann	Nominated
2024	The Wild Robot	Best Original Score	Kris Bowers	Nominated

=== Critics' Choice Movie Awards ===
Year	Film	Category	Recipient(s)	Result
1998	The Prince of Egypt	Best Animated Feature	Brenda Chapman, Steve Hickner, and Simon Wells (tied with A Bug's Life)	Won
1998	The Prince of Egypt	Best Song	"When You Believe"	Won
2000	Chicken Run	Best Animated Feature	Peter Lord and Nick Park	Won
2001	Shrek	Best Animated Feature	Andrew Adamson and Vicky Jenson	Won
2002	Spirit: Stallion of the Cimarron	Best Animated Feature	Kelly Asbury and Loona Cook	Nominated
2004	Shrek 2	Best Animated Feature	Andrew Adamson, Conrad Vernon and Kelly Asbury	Nominated
2004	Shrek 2	Best Song	"Accidentally in Love"	Nominated
2005	Madagascar	Best Animated Feature	Eric Darnell and Tom McGrath	Nominated
2005	Wallace & Gromit: The Curse of the Were-Rabbit	Best Animated Feature	Nick Park and Steve Box	Won
2006	Over the Hedge	Best Animated Feature	Tim Johnson and Karey Kirkpatrick	Nominated
2008	Kung Fu Panda	Best Animated Feature	Mark Osborne and John Stevenson	Nominated
2008	Madagascar: Escape 2 Africa	Best Animated Feature	Eric Darnell and Tom McGrath	Nominated
2010	How to Train Your Dragon	Best Animated Feature	Chris Sanders and Dean DeBlois	Nominated
2011	Kung Fu Panda 2	Best Animated Feature	Jennifer Yuh Nelson	Nominated
2011	Puss in Boots	Best Animated Feature	Chris Miller	Nominated
2012	Madagascar 3: Europe's Most Wanted	Best Animated Feature	Chris Buck and Tom McGrath	Nominated
2012	Rise of the Guardians	Best Animated Feature	Peter Ramsey	Nominated
2013	The Croods	Best Animated Feature	Chris Sanders and Kirk DeMicco	Nominated
2014	How to Train Your Dragon 2	Best Animated Feature	Dean DeBlois	Nominated
2016	Trolls	Best Animated Feature	Mike Mitchell	Nominated
2016	Trolls	Best Song	"Can't Stop the Feeling!"	Nominated
2019	How to Train Your Dragon: The Hidden World	Best Animated Feature	Dean DeBlois	Nominated
2022	Puss in Boots: The Last Wish	Best Animated Feature	Joel Crawford	Nominated
2024	The Wild Robot	Best Animated Feature	Chris Sanders	Won
2024	The Wild Robot	Best Song	"Kiss the Sky"	Nominated
2024	The Wild Robot	Best Score	Kris Bowers	Nominated

=== Kids' Choice Awards ===
Year	Film	Category	Result
2001	Chicken Run	Favorite Voice From an Animated Movie	Nominated
2002	Shrek	Favorite Movie	Nominated
2002	Shrek	Favorite Voice From an Animated Movie	Won
2003	Spirit: Stallion of the Cimarron	Favorite Voice From an Animated Movie	Nominated
2004	Sinbad: Legend of the Seven Seas	Favorite Voice From an Animated Movie	Nominated
2005	Shark Tale	Favorite Voice From an Animated Movie	Won
2005	Shrek 2	Favorite Voice From an Animated Movie	Nominated
2006	Madagascar	Favorite Animated Movie	Won
2006	Madagascar	Favorite Voice From an Animated Movie	Won
2007	Over the Hedge	Favorite Voice From an Animated Movie	Nominated
2008	Shrek the Third	Favorite Animated Movie	Nominated
2008	Shrek the Third	Favorite Voice From an Animated Movie	Won
2008	Bee Movie	Favorite Animated Movie	Nominated
2008	Bee Movie	Favorite Voice From an Animated Movie	Nominated
2009	Kung Fu Panda	Favorite Animated Movie	Nominated
2009	Kung Fu Panda	Favorite Voice From an Animated Movie	Won
2009	Madagascar: Escape 2 Africa	Favorite Animated Movie	Won
2009	Madagascar: Escape 2 Africa	Favorite Voice From an Animated Movie	Nominated
2010	Monsters vs. Aliens	Favorite Animated Movie	Nominated
2010	Monsters vs. Aliens	Favorite Voice From an Animated Movie	Nominated
2011	How to Train Your Dragon	Favorite Animated Movie	Nominated
2011	Shrek Forever After	Favorite Voice From an Animated Movie	Won
2011	Megamind	Favorite Buttkicker	Nominated
2012	Kung Fu Panda 2	Favorite Animated Movie	Nominated
2012	Kung Fu Panda 2	Favorite Voice From an Animated Movie	Nominated
2012	Puss in Boots	Favorite Animated Movie	Won
2012	Puss in Boots	Favorite Voice From an Animated Movie	Nominated
2013	Madagascar 3: Europe's Most Wanted	Favorite Animated Movie	Nominated
2013	Madagascar 3: Europe's Most Wanted	Favorite Voice From an Animated Movie	Nominated
2015	How to Train Your Dragon 2	Favorite Animated Movie	Nominated
2015	Penguins of Madagascar	Favorite Animated Movie	Nominated
2016	Home	Favorite Animated Movie	Nominated
2016	Home	Favorite Voice From an Animated Movie	Nominated
2017	Kung Fu Panda 3	Most Wanted Pet	Nominated
2017	Trolls	Favorite Animated Movie	Nominated
2017	Trolls	Favorite Voice From an Animated Movie	Nominated
2017	Trolls	Favorite Frenemies	Nominated
2018	Captain Underpants: The First Epic Movie	Favorite Animated Movie	Nominated
2021	The Croods: A New Age	Favorite Animated Movie	Nominated
2021	The Croods: A New Age	Favorite Voice From an Animated Movie	Nominated
2021	Trolls World Tour	Favorite Animated Movie	Nominated
2021	Trolls World Tour	Favorite Voice From an Animated Movie	Won
2022	The Boss Baby: Family Business	Favorite Animated Movie	Nominated
2023	The Bad Guys	Favorite Voice from an Animated Movie (Female)	Nominated
2023	Puss in Boots: The Last Wish	Favorite Voice from an Animated Movie (Female)	Nominated
2024	Kung Fu Panda 4	Favorite Animated Movie	Nominated
2024	Kung Fu Panda 4	Favorite Voice from an Animated Movie (Male)	Nominated
2024	Kung Fu Panda 4	Favorite Voice from an Animated Movie (Female)	Nominated
2024	Trolls Band Together	Favorite Animated Movie	Nominated
2024	Trolls Band Together	Favorite Voice from an Animated Movie (Male)	Nominated
2024	Trolls Band Together	Favorite Voice from an Animated Movie (Female)	Won
2024	Trolls Band Together	Favorite Villain	Nominated
2025	The Wild Robot	Favorite Animated Movie	Nominated
2025	The Wild Robot	Favorite Voice from an Animated Movie (Female)	Nominated
2025	Dog Man	Favorite Animated Movie	Nominated

=== National Board of Review ===
Year	Film	Category	Result
2000	Chicken Run	Best Animated Film	Won
2001	Shrek	Best Animated Film	Won
2014	How to Train Your Dragon 2	Best Animated Film	Won
2019	How to Train Your Dragon: The Hidden World	Best Animated Film	Won

=== Heartland Film Festival ===
Year	Film	Category	Result
2010	How to Train Your Dragon	Truly Moving Picture Award	Won
2011	Puss in Boots	Truly Moving Picture Award	Won
2014	Mr. Peabody & Sherman	Truly Moving Picture Award	Won
2021	Spirit Untamed	Truly Moving Picture Award	Won
2022	The Bad Guys	Truly Moving Picture Award	Won
2024	The Wild Robot	Truly Moving Picture Award	Won

=== Satellite Award ===
Year	Film	Category	Recipient(s)	Result
1998	Antz	Best Animated or Mixed Media Feature		Nominated
1998	The Prince of Egypt	Best Animated or Mixed Media Feature		Nominated
2000	Chicken Run	Best Animated or Mixed Media Feature		Won
2001	Shrek	Best Animated or Mixed Media Feature		Nominated
2002	Spirit: Stallion of the Cimarron	Best Animated or Mixed Media Feature		Nominated
2003	Sinbad: Legend of the Seven Seas	Best Animated or Mixed Media Feature		Nominated
2004	Shrek 2	Best Animated or Mixed Media Feature		Nominated
2005	Wallace & Gromit: The Curse of the Were-Rabbit	Best Animated or Mixed Media Feature		Nominated
2006	Flushed Away	Best Animated or Mixed Media Feature		Nominated
2010	How to Train Your Dragon	Best Animated or Mixed Media Feature		Nominated
2011	Kung Fu Panda 2	Best Animated or Mixed Media Feature		Nominated
2011	Puss in Boots	Best Animated or Mixed Media Feature		Nominated
2012	Madagascar 3: Europe's Most Wanted	Best Animated or Mixed Media Feature		Nominated
2012	Rise of the Guardians	Best Animated or Mixed Media Feature		Won
2013	The Croods	Best Animated or Mixed Media Feature		Nominated
2013	Turbo	Best Animated or Mixed Media Feature		Nominated
2014	How to Train Your Dragon 2	Best Animated or Mixed Media Feature		Nominated
2016	Trolls	Best Animated or Mixed Media Feature		Nominated
2017	The Boss Baby	Best Animated or Mixed Media Feature		Nominated
2019	How to Train Your Dragon: The Hidden World	Best Animated or Mixed Media Feature		Nominated
2022	The Bad Guys	Best Animated or Mixed Media Feature		Nominated
2024	The Wild Robot	Best Animated or Mixed Media Feature		Nominated

=== Saturn Award ===
Year	Film	Category	Recipient(s)	Result
2003	Sinbad: Legend of the Seven Seas	Best Animated Film	Tim Johnson and Patrick Gilmore	Nominated
2004	Shrek 2	Best Animated Film	Andrew Adamson, Kelly Asbury and Conrad Vernon	Nominated
2004	Shark Tale	Best Animated Film	Rob Letterman and Vicky Jenson	Nominated
2005	Wallace & Gromit: The Curse of the Were-Rabbit	Best Animated Film	Nick Park and Steve Box	Nominated
2005	Madagascar	Best Animated Film	Eric Darnell and Tom McGrath	Nominated
2006	Over the Hedge	Best Animated Film	Tim Johnson and Karey Kirkpatrick	Nominated
2006	Flushed Away	Best Animated Film	Sam Fell and David Bowers	Nominated
2007	Shrek the Third	Best Animated Film	Chris Miller and Raman Hui	Nominated
2008	Kung Fu Panda	Best Animated Film	Mark Osborne and John Stevenson	Nominated
2008	Madagascar 2: Escape to Africa	Best Animated Film	Eric Darnell and Tom McGrath	Nominated
2009	Monsters vs Aliens	Best Animated Film	Rob Letterman and Conrad Vernon	Won
2010	How to Train Your Dragon	Best Animated Film	Chris Sanders and Dean DeBlois	Nominated
2011	Kung Fu Panda 2	Best Animated Film	Jennifer Yuh Nelson	Nominated
2011	Puss in Boots	Best Animated Film	Chris Miller	Won
2014	How to Train Your Dragon 2	Best Animated Film	Dean DeBlois	Nominated
2015	Kung Fu Panda 3	Best Animated Film	Jennifer Yuh Nelson and Alessandro Carloni	Nominated
2016	Trolls	Best Animated Film	Mike Mitchell	Nominated
2017	The Boss Baby	Best Animated Film	Tom McGrath	Nominated
2019	How to Train Your Dragon: The Hidden World	Best Animated Film	Dean DeBlois	Nominated
2019/2020	Abominable	Best Animated Film	Jill Culton	Nominated
2019/2020	Trolls World Tour	Best Animated Film	Walt Dohrn	Nominated
2022	Puss in Boots: The Last Wish	Best Animated Film	Joel Crawford	Nominated
2024	Kung Fu Panda 4	Best Animated Film	Mike Mitchell	Nominated
2024	The Wild Robot	Best Animated Film	Chris Sanders	Won

== See also ==
- DreamWorks Animation Television
- List of Illumination productions
- List of Universal Animation Studios productions
- List of Universal Pictures theatrical animated feature films
