= Kristof Serrand =

French animator

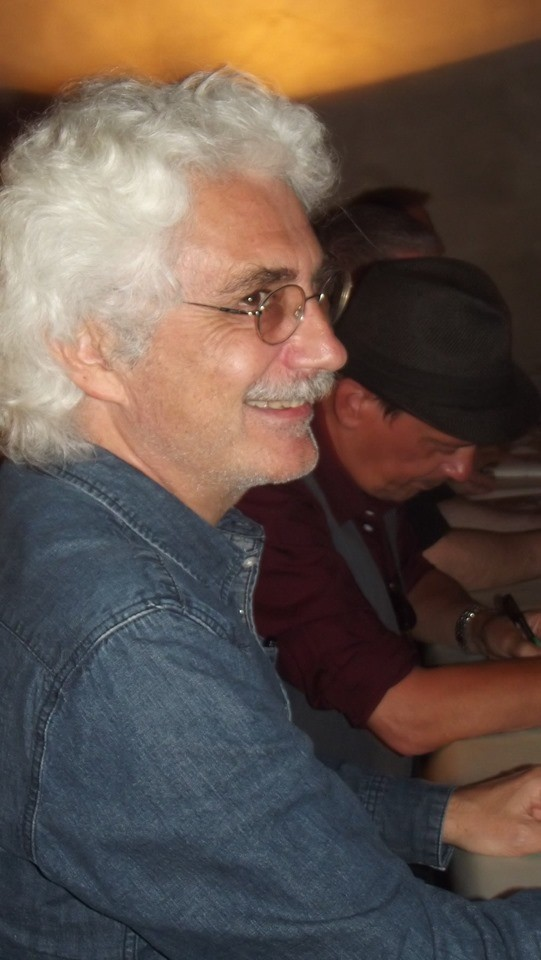
- Kristof Serrand at Annecy Animated Film Festival 2019.
- Born: Paris, France
- Occupation: Animator
- Years active: 1984–present
- Employer(s): Gaumont (1984–1989); Amblimation (1989–1995); DreamWorks Animation (1995–2020); Netflix (2020–present)

Kristof Serrand is a French animator. He is a supervising animator of Netflix.

== Biography ==
He studied at the Gobelins School of the Image, before joining Gaumont and then Amblimation, in 1989, then DreamWorks, in 1995 and now since 2020 in Netflix.

== Filmography ==
- Dessine-moi un marin (1984)
- Astérix et la surprise de César (1985)
- Astérix chez les Bretons (1986)
- La table tournante (1988)
- Astérix et le coup du menhir (1989)
- An American Tail: Fievel Goes West (1991)
- We're Back!: A Dinosaur's Story (1993)
- Balto (1995)
- The Prince of Egypt (1998)
- The Road to El Dorado (2000)
- Spirit: Stallion of the Cimarron (2002)
- Sinbad: Legend of the Seven Seas (2003)
- Shark Tale (2004)
- Over the Hedge (2006)
- How to Train Your Dragon (2010)
- The Croods (2013)
- How to Train Your Dragon 2 (2014)
- Penguins of Madagascar (2014)
- Kung Fu Panda 3 (2016)
- Bird Karma (2018)
- How to Train Your Dragon: The Hidden World (2019)
- Abominable (2019)
- The Croods: A New Age (2020)

== Awards ==
- Nominated for Character Animation in a Feature Production : Over the Hedge at 34th Annie Awards
