= Committed (comic strip) =

American comic strip by Michael Fry

- Author: Michael Fry
- Current status/schedule: Defunct
- Launch date: 1994
- End date: February 19, 2006
- Syndicate(s): United Feature Syndicate
- Genre: Family

Committed was an American comic strip written and drawn by Michael Fry. It ran from 1994 to 2006 and was syndicated by United Feature Syndicate. It was also adapted into an animated television series in 2001, produced by the Canada-based Nelvana.

== Synopsis ==
The strip was a family-oriented strip, centering on a suburban family consisted of two young children and their parents alongside their dog.

== History ==
Committed was first published in 1994, and was drawn and written by former Houston Post editorial cartoonist Michael Fry. The strip centered on a family consisted of Liz and Joe Larsen, daughters Tracy and Zelda, and their dog, Bob. It took a single-panel format in dailies, and a typical multi-panel format on Sundays. The comic's humor was based on the two working parents and their trying to raise children. One year after the strip began, Fry began a second strip, Over the Hedge, with T. Lewis.

In 2001, the comic was adapted into an animated television series, also entitled Committed. The series was aired on two channels: CTV (Canada) and WE tv (United States).

Fry ended Committed on February 19, 2006 for 12 years, stating that he was "creatively done with it". At the end of its run, Committed ran in only 45 newspapers.
