= Committed (Canadian TV series) =

2001 Canadian animated sitcom

- Genre: Animated sitcom
- Created by: Michael Fry
- Based on: Committed by Michael Fry
- Developed by: Howard Nemetz
- Written by: Michael Fry
- Directed by: Dennis Miller
- Voices of: Eugene Levy; Catherine O'Hara; Andrea Martin; Dave Foley; Annick Obonsawin; Charlotte Arnold; Cole Caplan
- Theme music composer: Martin Kucaj
- Opening theme: Trisha Yearwood
- Countries of origin: Canada; Philippines; United States
- Original language: English
- No. of seasons: 1
- No. of episodes: 13

Production
- Executive producer: Annie Groovie
- Producer: Frank Saperstein
- Editor: Kelly Vrooman
- Running time: approx. 23 minutes
- Production companies: CTV; Philippine Animation Studio Inc. Nelvana Limited

Original release
- Network: CTV (Canada); We TV (United States)
- Release: March 3 – June 8, 2001

Committed is a Canadian animated sitcom based on the comic strip of the same name by Michael Fry, co-produced by Nelvana Limited and Philippine Animation Studio Inc., the series aired on CTV from March 3 to June 8, 2001, and was broadcast by We TV as its first scripted original series in the United States.

== Premise ==
The show is based on the comic strip of the same name. It features mother Liz Larsen; her husband Joe; their children, twin ten-year-old girls Tracy & Zelda and their two-year-old son Nicholas; and their pet dog, Bob. The show's comedy focuses on the parents' attempts to balance their careers and personal lives while raising their children. Interludes of the cartoon feature Bob acting as a Greek chorus. Bob also breaks the fourth wall throughout the series.

The show features celebrity voice talents such as Eugene Levy as Joe Larsen, Catherine O'Hara as Liz Larsen, Andrea Martin as Frances Wilder, and Dave Foley as Bob the Dog.

Famous country singer celebrity Trisha Yearwood performs the theme song.

== Cast ==
- Catherine O'Hara as Liz Larsen, a level-headed mother and high-flying business woman who has to deal with misogyny at work and a chaotic household at home.
- Eugene Levy as Joe Larsen, a well-meaning but lazy father who reviews video games for an online journal.
- Andrea Martin as Frances Wilder, Liz's highly paranoid and hypochondriac mother who doesn't approve of Joe, and regularly criticises her daughter.
- Dave Foley as Bob the Dog, a lazy and unmotivated dog who often comments to the audience on the chaos unfolding around him.
- Annick Obonsawin as Tracy Larsen, Liz and Joe's eldest daughter who likes all things girly, which concerns Liz who fears she'll become shackled to traditional gender roles.
- Charlotte Arnold as Zelda Larsen, the middle child and a tomboy who gets along well with Joe due to sharing a lot of interests with him.
- Cole Caplan as Nicholas Larsen, the youngest child and Liz and Joe's only son. He often displays effeminate behaviour, much to Joe's dismay as he wants his son to be more manly.
- Oscar Hsu as Gary Wong, a pizza shop owner who Liz often calls to ask for advice from.
- Ron Pardo as Cal, Liz's sexist and dishonest coworker who is more than willing to trample over Liz's career prospects to advance his own career.
- Linda Kash as Val, the vain wife of Liz's boss who looks down on Liz for her perceived lack of fashion sense, and her decision to have kids.
- Len Carlson as Additional Voices
- Greg Spottiswood as Additional Voices
- Adrian Truss as Additional Voices

== Episodes ==
| No. | Title |
|---|---|
| 1 | "Liz's Choice" |
When the babysitter quits, working parents Liz and Joe Larsen have to scramble to find childcare for their two-year-old potty training Nicholas.
| 2 | "Time Waits For No Mom" |
Liz faces a performance review at work, while trying to keep track of three sick kids and a husband facing a writing deadline.
| 3 | "Mom On Strike" |
Liz comes home from work to find the house a mess and her family oblivious.
| 4 | "My Daughter The Star" |
After ten-year-old Tracy gets a part in an experimental school play, Joe and Liz disagree about how to best encourage her new-found interest in acting.
| 5 | "Two Minutes to Paradise" |
Having scheduled a romantic date night, Liz ends up reassessing the state of her marriage while waiting for Joe to watch the last two minutes of a championship basketball game.
| 6 | "www.joie-de-tot.com" |
Joie de Tot, Nicholas' daycare center, has just installed a web cam so the parents can watch their kids during the day.
| 7 | "Life Goes On, Bra" |
When Tracy decides she needs a bra, Liz is forced to face the reality that her little girl is becoming a pre-woman.
| 8 | "Who Wants To Be A Crillionaire?" |
On a field trip, an eight-year-old Zelda's bus has a minor accident.
| 9 | "Be My Guest" |
The new next-door neighbors ask the Larsens to dog-sit in their all-new, cutting edge computer controlled home.
| 10 | "Married To The Mob Rat" |
Liz discovers that Zelda's Girl Tracker cookie drive is not only controlled by the mob, but that the cookies are made by her company.
| 11 | "There Must Be a Pony" |
Liz suggests to a bored Zelda that she throw herself into hobby.
| 12 | "The College Slush Fund" |
After a career day at school, Zelda and Tracy discover that going to college costs money.
| 13 | "Beauty Is In The Eye of the Beholden" |
Liz questions her attractiveness when Joe is picked to judge "The Miss Downloadable" beauty contest.

== Critical reception ==
Lynne Heffley of The Los Angeles Times gave the show a mostly-negative review, stating that "Not even the show's few moments of genuinely resonant parental reality can overcome forced plotlines".
