= Over the Hedge =

2006 American animated film

- Theatrical release poster
- Directed by: Tim Johnson; Karey Kirkpatrick
- Screenplay by: Len Blum; Lorne Cameron; David Hoselton; Karey Kirkpatrick
- Based on: Over the Hedge by: Michael Fry; T. Lewis
- Produced by: Bonnie Arnold
- Starring: Bruce Willis; Garry Shandling; Steve Carell; William Shatner; Wanda Sykes; Nick Nolte
- Edited by: John K. Carr
- Music by: Rupert Gregson-Williams
- Production company: DreamWorks Animation
- Distributed by: Paramount Pictures (Note: In July 2014, the film's distribution rights were purchased by DreamWorks Animation from Paramount Pictures and transferred to 20th Century Fox before reverting to Universal Pictures in 2018 following NBCUniversal's acquisition of DreamWorks Animation in 2016.)
- Release dates: April 30, 2006 (Los Angeles); May 19, 2006 (United States)
- Running time: 83 minutes
- Country: United States
- Language: English
- Budget: $80 million
- Box office: $339.8 million

Over the Hedge is a 2006 American animated comedy film directed by Tim Johnson and Karey Kirkpatrick, and written by Len Blum, Lorne Cameron, David Hoselton and Kirkpatrick. It is based on the Over the Hedge comic strip by Michael Fry and T. Lewis, and was produced by DreamWorks Animation. The voice cast stars Bruce Willis, Garry Shandling, Steve Carell, William Shatner, Wanda Sykes, and Nick Nolte. The plot follows RJ (Willis), a raccoon who is forced to deliver food to a bear named Vincent (Nolte) after accidentally destroying his stockpile of food, whereupon he manipulates a family of woodland animals, led by a turtle named Verne (Shandling), into helping him steal food from a local housing development in order to speed up the process.

Over the Hedge premiered in Los Angeles on April 30, 2006, and was theatrically released in the United States on May 19 by Paramount Pictures. The film received generally positive reviews from critics for its humor, charm, and animation. It was a commercial success, grossing $339.8 million worldwide on an $80 million budget.

== Plot ==
A raccoon known as RJ, unable to find food for himself, attempts to steal a stockpile from a bear named Vincent. His attempt backfires when Vincent is woken up by the commotion and the food is destroyed. Vincent almost kills RJ, who offers to replace his food within one week. Vincent threatens to kill him if he fails or runs away.

The next morning, a family of woodland animals led by a turtle named Verne awaken from hibernation on the first day of spring. They discover that most of the forest they lived in has been turned into a housing development, separated from the remaining forest by a giant hedge. RJ introduces himself to the group and explains that they can obtain better food by scavenging off the humans. Despite Verne's concerns, RJ convinces the other animals to steal and stockpile food. They are oblivious to his true intentions regarding Vincent, which causes him to grow guilty. Gladys Sharp, the neighborhood homeowner association president, notices the animal problem and hires exterminator Dwayne LaFontant. When RJ tries to stop a worried Verne from returning the pile of food in order to avoid Dwayne, the food is destroyed following a chase with an excited Rottweiler named Nugent. Verne is blamed for the destruction and shunned by the family after he accidentally insults them for listening to RJ.

That night, RJ witnesses Dwayne rigging animal traps, including an illegal contraband device called the Depelter Turbo, in Gladys' yard. A guilty Verne reconciles with RJ and the other animals, and RJ convinces everyone to invade Gladys' home and steal her massive stockpile of food. The squirrel Hammy disables the Depelter Turbo while the striped skunk Stella steals the collar of Gladys' Persian cat, Tiger, which enables entry into the house. The animals stockpile another wagon full of food, but before leaving, RJ sees a can of Spuddies potato chips and becomes determined to get it per Vincent's request. RJ flees with the food while Verne and the other animals are captured by Dwayne, who takes them away in his van.

Upon delivering the food to Vincent, RJ sees Dwayne's truck driving past, leading to RJ having a change of heart. In an attempt to free the animals, he crashes the wagon into Dwayne's van and knocks him unconscious. This prompts an enraged Vincent to attack RJ and the other animals while the porcupine triplets drive the van back to the neighborhood. Verne convinces the other animals to forgive RJ during the commotion. The animals crash the van into Gladys' home and return to the hedge, only for Vincent to attack them on one side of the hedge, and Gladys and Dwayne to attack them on the other side.

Hammy, fueled by an energy drink, reactivates the Depelter Turbo while RJ and Verne trick Vincent into leaping over the hedge, resulting in him, Gladys, and Dwayne being caught in the Depelter Turbo. The local animal control service ships Vincent to the Rocky Mountains, Gladys is arrested for possessing the Depelter Turbo and resisting arrest, and Dwayne's attempt to escape arrest is thwarted by Nugent. With them gone, RJ rejoins the woodland creatures permanently alongside Tiger, who had fallen in love with Stella, and Hammy reveals he has found the nuts he had stored for the previous winter, replenishing the animals' food supply.

That night, RJ shows his family the vending machine from the beginning of the movie. They easily manage to get all the products out before realizing they've blocked the door from opening from the outside.

== Voice cast ==
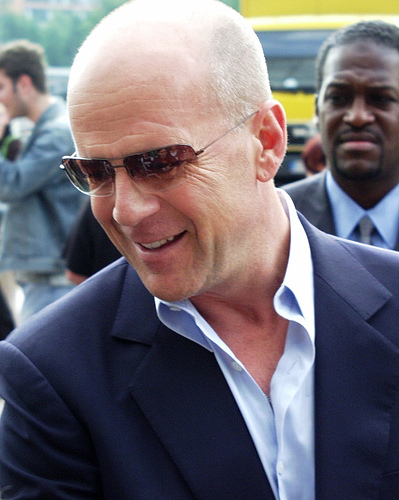
Bruce Willis (pictured in 2006) voices RJ the raccoon.

- Bruce Willis as RJ, a manipulative raccoon
- Garry Shandling as Verne, the turtle leader of the foragers
- Steve Carell as Hammy, a squirrel
- Wanda Sykes as Stella, a striped skunk
- William Shatner and Avril Lavigne as Ozzie and Heather, an opossum father and teenage daughter respectively
- Allison Janney as Gladys Sharp, president of the Homeowners Association
- Thomas Haden Church as Dwyane the Verminator, a pest exterminator
- Nick Nolte as Vincent, an American black bear
- Eugene Levy and Catherine O'Hara as Lou and Penny, a porcupine couple
- Paul Butcher as Skeeter, a boy
- Omid Djalili as Tiger, Gladys' cat
- Shane Baumel, Sami Kirkpatrick and Madison Davenport as Spike, Bucky and Quillo, Lou and Penny's triplets
- Brian Stepanek as Nugent, a dog
- Debra Wilson as Debbie, Timmy's mother
- Zoe Randol as Mackenzie
- Jessica DiCicco as Shelby
- Kejon Kesse as Timmy
- Lee Bienstock and Sean Yazbeck as Lunch Table Larry and BBQ Barry, who won the roles via The Apprentice 5

== Production ==
=== Casting ===
Bill Murray and Harold Ramis were initially considered as the voices of RJ and Verne, respectively. In July 2002, Jim Carrey was announced to co-star in the film as RJ, with Garry Shandling as Verne. However, Carrey dropped out in October 2004 and was replaced by Bruce Willis, although some of the former's lines remained. Gene Wilder was offered a role in the film as well, namely an owl named Norbert, but he turned it down, and that character was ultimately scrapped.

=== Animation ===
Production officially began on July 15, 2002. While production was based at DreamWorks' Glendale campus, a satellite crew working out of the Pacific Data Images studios helped with additional animation, effects, and lighting support.

== Music ==
The soundtrack for the film was released on May 16, 2006, by Epic Records. Rupert Gregson-Williams composed the original score while Hans Zimmer served as an executive music producer and Ben Folds contributed three original songs, along with a rewrite of his song "Rockin' the Suburbs" and a cover of The Clash's "Lost in the Supermarket".

For the Japanese and Korean dubs of the movie, BoA provides the voice of Heather the opossum and sings the theme songs, "KEY OF HEART" for the Japanese release, and "People Say" for the Korean release.

== Release ==
=== Theatrical ===
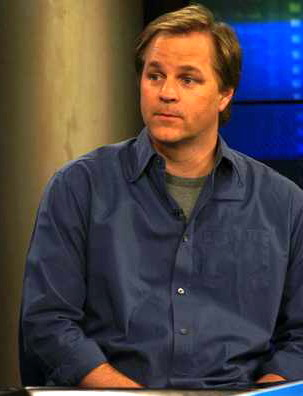
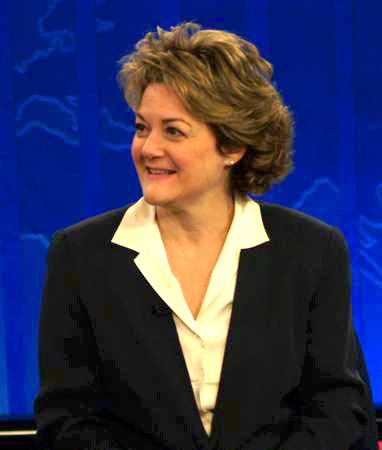
Co-director Karey Kirkpatrick and producer Bonnie Arnold in 2006 promoting the film

Over the Hedge had an original release date of November 2005; however, in December 2004, the date was changed to May 2006. The film was originally to be distributed by DreamWorks Animation's former parent company DreamWorks SKG (who distributed DWA's films from 1998 to 2005). In late 2005, distributor Paramount Pictures' parent company Viacom purchased DreamWorks Pictures, which led DWA to terminate its distribution contact with its former parent and sign a seven-year distribution deal with Paramount in early 2006 (the latter would later obtain distribution rights to the DWA films that were released by DreamWorks SKG from 1998–2005 until 2014 when DWA acquired Paramount's distribution rights to the pre-2012 library, and the distribution rights were transferred to 20th Century Fox, DWA's distribution partner from 2013 to 2017, after the end of their distribution deal with Paramount in 2012, the distribution rights were transferred again to Universal Pictures in 2018, after its parent company NBCUniversal purchased DreamWorks Animation in 2016 and after the end of their distribution deal with 20th Century Fox in 2017), and thus, Over the Hedge became DreamWorks Animation's first film to be distributed under this deal.

The film was screened as a "work-in-progress" on April 29, 2006, at the Indianapolis International Film Festival, and premiered on April 30 in Los Angeles. Nolte, Willis, Lavigne, Shandling, Sykes, O'Hara and Steve Carell attended the premiere. It was theatrically released in the United States on May 19, 2006 by Paramount Pictures. In select theaters, it was accompanied by the short film First Flight. The film was also screened out of competition on May 21, 2006, at the Cannes Film Festival.

=== Home media ===
Over the Hedge was released on DVD, in wide- and full-screen editions, by DreamWorks Animation's newly-formed home entertainment division and Paramount Home Entertainment on October 17, 2006.

The film was released on Blu-ray on February 5, 2019, by Universal Pictures Home Entertainment as a Walmart exclusive, and was subsequently given a wider release on June 4.

The film's home media releases feature Hammy's Boomerang Adventure, a short film taking place after the events of the film that was also later added in the Madly Madagascar (2013) DVD as a bonus feature. It features Steve Carell, Bruce Willis, Madison Davenport, Shane Baumel, Sami Kirkpatrick and Garry Shandling reprising their roles from the main film.

== Tie-ins ==
=== Video games ===
A video game based on the film was released on May 9, 2006. Developed by Edge of Reality, Beenox and Vicarious Visions, it was published by Activision for the PlayStation 2, Microsoft Windows, Xbox, GameCube, Nintendo DS and Game Boy Advance. Shane Baumel, Sami Kirkpatrick, and Madison Davenport were the only ones to reprise their roles for the video game while the other characters were voiced by different actors.

Three different versions of the video game Over the Hedge: Hammy Goes Nuts! were released by Activision in the fall of 2006: a miniature golf game for Game Boy Advance, an action adventure game for Nintendo DS, and a platform game for PlayStation Portable.

=== Picture books ===
Scholastic published a series of picture books to tie-in with the film. Two books, Over the Hedge: Meet the Neighbors and Over the Hedge: Movie Storybook, were both authored by Sarah Durkee and illustrated by Michael Koelsch.

== Reception ==
=== Box office ===
On its opening weekend, Over the Hedge finished in second place to The Da Vinci Code, but its gross of $38,457,003 did not quite live up to DreamWorks Animation's other titles released over the past few years. The film had a per-theater average of $9,474 from 4,059 theaters. In its second weekend, the film dropped 30% to $27,063,774 for a $6,612 average from an expanded 4,093 theaters and finishing third, behind X-Men: The Last Stand and The Da Vinci Code. Since it was Memorial Day Weekend, the film grossed a total of $35,322,115 over the four-day weekend, resulting in only an 8% slide. In its third weekend, the film held well with a 24% drop to $20,647,284 and once again placing in third behind The Break-Up and X-Men: The Last Stand, for a $5,170 average from 3,993 theaters. The film closed on September 4, 2006, after 112 days of release, grossing $155,019,340 in the United States and Canada, along with $180,983,656 internationally for a worldwide total of $336,002,996, against a production budget of $80 million.

=== Critical response ===
On Rotten Tomatoes, the film has a rating of 75% based on 172 reviews, with an average score of 6.80/10. The site's consensus states: "Even if it's not an animation classic, Over the Hedge is clever and fun, and the jokes cater to family members of all ages." On Metacritic, the film has a score of 67 out of 100, based on 31 critics, indicating "generally favorable" reviews. Audiences polled by CinemaScore gave the film an average grade of "A" on an A+ to F scale.

Ken Fox of TVGuide.com praised the film for being "a sly satire of American 'enough is never enough' consumerism and blind progress at the expense of the environment. It's also very funny, and the little woodland critters that make up the cast are a kiddie-pleasing bunch." Roger Ebert of the Chicago Sun-Times give the film three out of four and called it "Not at the level of Finding Nemo or Shrek, but is a lot of fun, awfully nice to look at, and filled with energy and smiles." Nick De Semlyen of Empire give the film three out of five and wrote, "You'll soon be sick of digital furballs, but there's plenty of fun here and Hammy is up there with Ice Age's Scrat in the pantheon of lunatic movie rodents". Peter Bradshaw of The Guardian gave the film two out of five, writing "The spoilt and wasteful American consumer is satirised in this patchy animated comedy from DreamWorks".

=== Accolades ===
Awards
Award	Category	Recipients	Result
Annie Awards	Best Animated Feature		Nominated
Annie Awards	Character Animation in a Feature Production	Kristof Serrand	Nominated
Annie Awards	Character Design in a Feature Production	Nico Marlet	Won
Annie Awards	Directing in a Feature Production	Tim Johnson & Karey Kirkpatrick	Won
Annie Awards	Production Design in a Feature Production	Paul Shardlow	Nominated
Annie Awards	Storyboarding in a Feature Production	Thom Enriquez	Nominated
Annie Awards	Storyboarding in a Feature Production	Gary Graham	Won
Annie Awards	Voice Acting in a Feature Production	Wanda Sykes	Nominated
Critics' Choice Awards	Best Animated Feature		Nominated
Kids' Choice Awards	Animated Movie		Nominated
Kids' Choice Awards	Voice From an Animated Movie	Bruce Willis	Nominated
Online Film Critics Society Awards	Best Animated Film		Nominated
People's Choice Awards	Favorite Family Movie		Nominated
Saturn Awards	Best Animated Film		Nominated
Toronto Film Critics Association Awards	Best Animated Film		Nominated
Cannes Film Festival	Golden Camera	Karey Kirkpatrick	Nominated
Capri Hollywood International Film Festival	Capri Arts Award	Enzo Ghinazzi	Won
Genesis Awards	Outstanding Family Feature - Animated	DreamWorks	Nominated
Gold Derby Awards	Best Animated Feature	Best Animated Feature	Nominated
Golden Schmoes Awards	Best Animated Movie of the Year	Best Animated Movie of the Year	Nominated
Indianapolis Film Festival	Best Family Film	Tim Johnson & Karey Kirkpatrick	Won

== Future ==
In May 2007, DreamWorks Animation CEO Jeffrey Katzenberg said that Over the Hedge would not receive a sequel due to its box office performance, saying that "It was close. An almost." In October 2010, Michael Fry, co-creator of Over the Hedge, explained the chances of a sequel on the strip's blog:

The Over the Hedge film cost about $100 million to make (with allocated overhead included) [...] In the end the film nets about $50 million. Not bad. But it's not the $300-$400 million that Shrek netted.

Now let's say you want to make Hedge II. First off, you have to actually pay the actors this time. They did the first one for a fraction of their usual rates with the hope that there would be a sequel and they could cash in. That adds about $20 million to the budget. Now your margin is pretty slim. If the second film doesn't perform as well as the first you could actually lose money. So, when you have the choice of doing Madagascar III (Mad II nets $200 million) and Hedge II, that's no choice at all.

Combine this with the fact that DWA is a small studio that makes 2 to 3 [movies] per year and the choice becomes even easier. A larger studio could make Hedge II and amortize the potiential [sic] risk across 20-30 movies instead of just 3. [...] In the end, the only hope for Hedge II or a Hedge TV show is if DWA is bought by a large studio. Which will happen eventually. Eventually being defined as a long, long time.

Fry reiterated this in 2013, noting that the financial risk for DreamWorks was "just too high."

== Legacy ==
The atmospheric phenomenon called STEVE was named after the hedge that divides the animals’ forest from a new housing development.
