= Bird Karma =

2018 film by William Salazar

- Promotional image
- Directed by: William Salazar
- Written by: William Salazar
- Produced by: Jeff Hermann
- Edited by: James Ryan; C. K. Horness
- Music by: Nora Kroll-Rosenbaum
- Animation by: William Salazar; Jakob Jensen; Simon Otto; Kristof Serrand; Stephen Wood
- Backgrounds by: Raymond Zibach
- Production company: DreamWorks Animation
- Distributed by: Universal Pictures
- Release dates: February 24, 2018 (NYICFF); March 21, 2018 (with The Boss Baby in Japan)
- Running time: 5 minutes
- Country: United States

Bird Karma is a 2018 American animated short film written and directed by William Salazar and produced by DreamWorks Animation. It was the first short to come from DreamWorks' newly created shorts program, and the studio's first film to utilize only traditional animation since Sinbad: Legend of the Seven Seas in 2003. It is also the first DreamWorks Animation production to be distributed by Universal Pictures following parent company NBCUniversal's acquisition of the studio in 2016.

== Plot ==
On a foggy lake, a long-legged bird flies into the water and, to a musical beat, catches and eats some fish. Eventually, he sees a sparkling orange fish jumping out of the water and vainly attempts to catch it until it begins to rain. The next morning, the bird again spots the fish and gives chase, but his attention is soon diverted by the fish's ability to create rainbow trails when he jumps from the water. But despite his amazement of the sight, the bird lures the fish into a false sense of friendship and proceeds to catch and eat it. However, this meal causes the bird to grow sick, turn orange and fall over dead, after which the fish in the lake begin to devour his corpse.

== Production ==
The idea for Bird Karma originated in the mid-1990s, when director William Salazar created a pencil test of a long-legged bird while working at Amblimation in London. After moving to Los Angeles to work at DreamWorks Animation, his work laid untouched in his attic for two decades. When DreamWorks announced an internal shorts program, Salazar revisited his idea and, over a period of three months, expanded his test into a three-minute animatic and pitched it to the program.

Besides Salazar, who animated over 75% of the film, other animators on Bird Karma included Jakob Jensen, Simon Otto, Kristof Serrand and Stephen Wood, most of whom had worked with Salazar since The Prince of Egypt. Salazar intended for the animation to have a "clean-rough" style; thus, the animators had to clean up their drawings on their own without a separate clean-up crew.

Production designer Raymond Zibach (Kung Fu Panda, The Road to El Dorado) painted all the backgrounds for the film, whose visual style was inspired by the works of J. M. W. Turner.

== Release ==
Bird Karma made its world premiere on February 24, 2018, when it was included on a program of shorts as part of New York International Children's Film Festival, and was then attached to the Japanese theatrical release of The Boss Baby the following month on March 21 before it was shown as the opening program of the Annecy International Animated Film Festival that June. On December 21, the short was released on DreamWorks' official YouTube channel.

Bird Karma, along with Bilby, was included on home video releases of How to Train Your Dragon: The Hidden World on May 21, 2019.

The short can also be found on the owned-and-operated over-the-top video streaming service by DreamWorks' owner NBCUniversal Peacock.

== Reception ==
Bird Karma has met positive reception. It won the Audience Award at the 2018 San Francisco International Film Festival, and was lauded when screened at CalArts, Gnomon and the CTN Animation Expo.
