= Bonnie Arnold =

American film producer

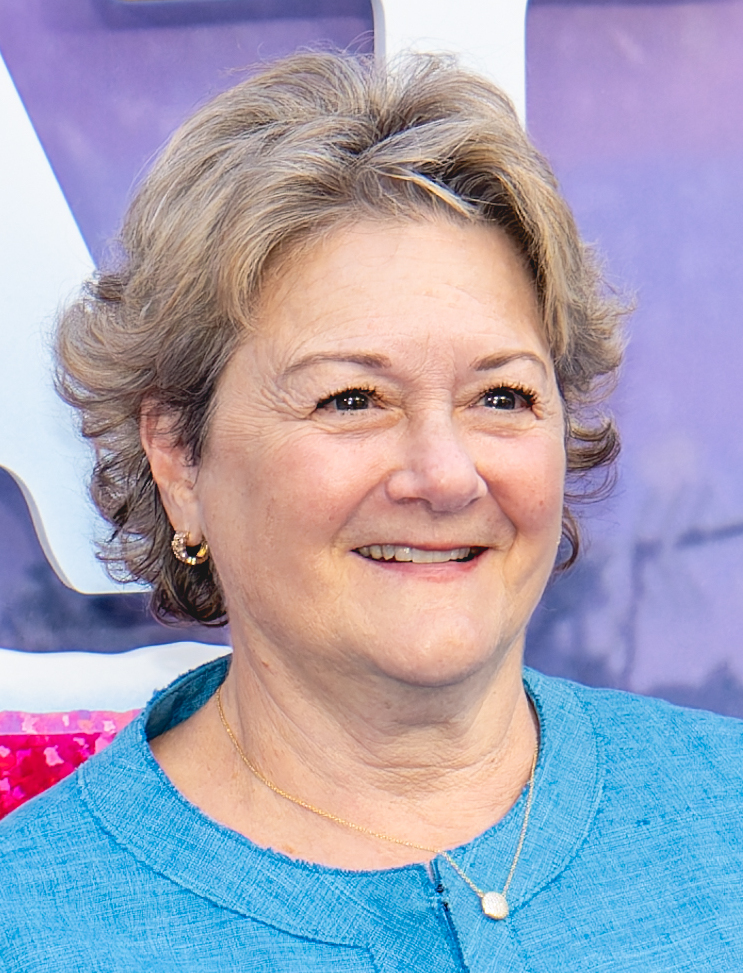
- Arnold at the 2024 BFI London Film Festival premiere of That Christmas
- Education: University of Georgia; Boston University
- Occupations: Film producer Media executive
- Years active: 1984–present
- Notable work: Toy Story; Tarzan; Over the Hedge; The Last Station; How to Train Your Dragon series
- Children: 1

Bonnie Arnold is an American film producer and executive who has worked at Walt Disney Animation Studios, Pixar Animation Studios and DreamWorks Animation. Arnold was born in Atlanta, Georgia, and rose to prominence in Hollywood during the initial wave of computer animation.

== Life and career ==
Arnold has a B.S. in journalism from the University of Georgia and a M.S. in journalism from Boston University. Her interest in journalism led her to her first professional assignment as unit publicist for American Playhouse's debut production, King of America. Arnold's first job on a Hollywood feature was as production coordinator for Neil Simon's The Slugger's Wife, a 1984 film shot in Atlanta and produced by Ray Stark, who was responsible for many of Simon and Barbra Streisand's movie hits. "I got a real sense of filmmaking the Hollywood way," Arnold recalls. From there, she freelanced in film production in Atlanta and met producer David Picker, who invited her to work at Columbia Pictures in Los Angeles. While working on the Tony Scott movie Revenge at Columbia, Arnold met Kevin Costner and ended up joining the Dances with Wolves production as associate producer. In 1992, Arnold was recruited by Peter Schneider and John Lasseter to work on Toy Story for Disney. When Toy Story became a box office smash, she produced Tarzan, overseeing a crew of 1,100 and a $130 million budget—four and a third times that of Toy Story. In 2001, after she finished Tarzan, Jeffrey Katzenberg invited Arnold to produce Over the Hedge at DreamWorks Animation.

Arnold continued to work on the How to Train Your Dragon franchise, for which she has received a Golden Globe Award and two Academy Award nominations.

After DreamWorks saw a series of financially disappointing films, DreamWorks Animation named Arnold co-president of feature animation in early 2015. Along with Mireille Soria, she was tasked with overseeing creative development and production of DWA's theatrical releases. In 2016, Soria stepped down from her role as co-president to return to producing, leaving Arnold the sole president of feature animation.

Arnold became an executive at DreamWorks Animation until 2017 when she returned to her work as a full-time producer. Arnold executive-produced the Netflix and DreamWorks Animation film Orion and the Dark which was released on February 2, 2024. More recently, Arnold also executive-produced the Netflix and Locksmith Animation film That Christmas which was released on December 4, 2024.

Arnold is set to produce an upcoming Peanuts animated feature film for Apple TV. Work on the project began in 2024.

To date, Arnold's films have grossed over $2.2 billion at the box office. In addition, she is a member of the Academy of Motion Picture Arts and Sciences and the British Academy of Film and Television Arts.

== Personal life ==
Unlike most people in the animation industry whose love for animation arises out of the moment they watched a specific film, Arnold's lifelong obsession with animation came about because of the quality of the music for an animated film: Disney Animation's Cinderella. As a young girl in 1962, she had a 78 rpm record of the soundtrack on a portable player, and she listened to the entire soundtrack for that film all the time.

Arnold resides in Santa Monica with her husband and daughter. Her favourite hobbies include playing tennis and reading anything by Mississippi writer Eudora Welty. She credits her interest in family movies to her mother, a teacher and avid film buff who often took her and her brother to watch movies at a theatre where her uncle worked as a projectionist.

== Filmography ==
Year	Title	Role
1990	Dances with Wolves	Associate producer
1991	The Addams Family	Associate producer
1995	Toy Story	Producer
1999	Tarzan	Producer
2006	Over the Hedge	Producer
2009	The Last Station	Producer
2010	How to Train Your Dragon	Producer
2014	How to Train Your Dragon 2	Producer
2019	How to Train Your Dragon: The Hidden World	Producer
2024	Orion and the Dark	Executive producer
2024	That Christmas	Executive producer
