= First Flight (film) =

- Film poster
- Directed by: Cameron Hood; Kyle Jefferson
- Written by: Cameron Hood; Kyle Jefferson
- Produced by: Maryann Garger; Pilar Flynn
- Starring: Jeanine Meyers; Jon Spinogatti
- Edited by: Marcus Taylor
- Music by: James Dooley
- Production company: DreamWorks Animation
- Distributed by: Paramount Pictures
- Release dates: May 19, 2006 (with Over the Hedge); January 29, 2013 (DVD)
- Running time: 7 minutes
- Country: United States
- Language: English

First Flight is a 2006 animated comedy short film produced by DreamWorks Animation. It was written and directed by Cameron Hood and Kyle Jefferson.

The short debuted on March 12, 2006, at the South by Southwest Festival in Austin, Texas. Theatrically it was released on May 19, 2006, in select New York and Los Angeles theaters, together with the film Over the Hedge.

== Premise ==
The film tells the story of a fastidious businessman whose perspective on life is forever changed through an unexpected encounter with a tiny, fledgling bird.

== Cast ==
- Jeanine Meyers as Bird
- Jon Spinogatti as Swift/Bus Driver

== Home media ==
First Flight is a special feature on the Madly Madagascar DVD along with Hammy's Boomerang Adventure, an Over the Hedge short film.
