= Orion and the Dark =

Film by Sean Charmatz

- Release poster
- Directed by: Sean Charmatz
- Written by: Charlie Kaufman
- Based on: Orion and the Dark by Emma Yarlett
- Produced by: Peter McCown
- Starring: Jacob Tremblay; Paul Walter Hauser; Colin Hanks; Mia Akemi Brown; Ike Barinholtz; Nat Faxon; Golda Rosheuvel; Natasia Demetriou; Aparna Nancherla; Carla Gugino; Matt Dellapina; Angela Bassett
- Edited by: Kevin Sukho Lee
- Music by: Robert Lydecker; Kevin Lax
- Production company: DreamWorks Animation
- Distributed by: Netflix
- Release date: February 2, 2024 (United States)
- Running time: 93 minutes
- Country: United States
- Language: English

Orion and the Dark is a 2024 American animated fantasy comedy film written by Charlie Kaufman and directed by Sean Charmatz. Produced by DreamWorks Animation for Netflix, it is based on the 2014 children's book Orion and the Dark by Emma Yarlett. The film stars Jacob Tremblay and Paul Walter Hauser as the titular characters, alongside the voices of Colin Hanks, Mia Akemi Brown, Ike Barinholtz, Nat Faxon, Golda Rosheuvel, Natasia Demetriou, Aparna Nancherla, Carla Gugino, Matt Dellapina, and Angela Bassett. Robert Lydecker and Kevin Lax composed the film's musical score.

Orion and the Dark premiered at the TUDUM Theater in Los Angeles on January 27, 2024, and was released on Netflix on February 2. The film received positive reviews from critics.

== Plot ==
Orion is a severely anxious 11-year-old with an extensive list of irrational fears. He journals his fears in his diary and is nervous about being rejected by his school crush, Sally, at an upcoming planetarium field trip. On the 10th of March, 1995, after a sudden blackout, Orion is greeted by Dark, the embodiment of his worst fear, in his bedroom. Tired of Orion's constant complaints about him, Dark offers to take Orion on a trip to help him overcome his fears by showing him the benefits and wonders of nighttime. Along the way, it is revealed that an adult Orion is telling the story to his young daughter, Hypatia, to help with her fears.

During their travels, Dark introduces Orion to his fellow night entities Sleep, Insomnia, Quiet, Unexplained Noises and Sweet Dreams. Dark convinces them to let Orion witness their work, to which they reluctantly agree. Initially, Orion's anxious behavior interferes with the night entities' jobs, but as Orion warms up to and eventually befriends Dark, he helps the night entities in their tasks. Additionally, Orion briefly encounters Light, Dark's nemesis who brings daylight in the mornings while Dark brings nighttime in the evenings.

Continuing their journey, Orion inadvertently remarks how Light seems preferable to Dark, as Light makes him feel safe and warm. Feeling dejected, the other entities abandon their nighttime duties in exchange for working during the day. Angry and saddened by their abandonment, Dark stops on a mountaintop. A guilty Orion pleads with Dark to move before Light passes through and disintegrates him but Dark stays still and vanishes as Light passes through him, abandoning Orion. Now alone, Orion sits on the mountaintop, which he realizes is the back of a flying turtle, ashamed of his actions.

With the story ended, the now adult Orion and his daughter Hypatia walk through the city to the planetarium. Hypatia is shocked by his ending and suggests a different narrative. As she takes over the story, Orion, now alone at the beach, is met by Hypatia who promises to help him. She recites a poem she has written based on the story so far and the night entities return, having witnessed the chaos brought by endless daylight without nighttime to maintain the natural balance of the world. Remembering Dark to be the literal embodiment of Orion's worst fear, they realize Orion needs to sleep and dream about Dark to bring him back.

With Sweet Dreams' help, the two children enter Orion's subconscious and successfully summon Dark from the memory of the first time they met in Orion's bedroom, but the reunion is cut short when his closet door opens and reveals a black hole which tries to pull Dark in. Finally learning to accept his fears, Orion jumps in to save Dark, while Quiet softly wakes him up right in time for them to get out of the dream. Dark reappears, restoring the natural order of the world, and returns the children to Orion's house before bidding them farewell. After Dark's departure, Hypatia is now stuck 20 years in her past with no way to return home. However, the story is resolved as a young boy named Tycho arrives in a time machine to bring Hypatia back.

The story ends again, and it is revealed that an adult Hypatia is telling the story to her son, Tycho. Finishing the story, Hypatia goes outside to say goodnight to her father and mother, the now much older Orion and Sally, as the scene cuts back to the start with a young Orion and Sally gazing at the stars on the Planetarium field trip.

== Voice cast ==
- Jacob Tremblay as Orion Mendelson
  - Colin Hanks as adult Orion
- Paul Walter Hauser as Dark
- Angela Bassett as Sweet Dreams
- Ike Barinholtz as Light
- Natasia Demetriou as Sleep
- Golda Rosheuvel as Unexplained Noises/Debbie
- Nat Faxon as Insomnia
- Aparna Nancherla as Quiet
- Carla Gugino as Orion's mother
- Matt Dellapina as Dom Mendelson, Orion's father
- Mia Akemi Brown as Hypatia, adult Orion's daughter
  - Shannon Chan-Kent as adult Hypatia
- Shino Nakamichi as Sally
  - Ren Hanami as adult Sally
- Jack Fisher as Richi Panichi
- Nick Kishiyama as Tycho
- Werner Herzog as the narrator

== Production ==
It was announced on June 12, 2023, that Netflix and DreamWorks Animation had collaborated on the film, which was written by Charlie Kaufman, and debuted several segments at the annual Annecy International Animation Film Festival that same day. Jacob Tremblay, Paul Walter Hauser and Werner Herzog were announced as part of the voice cast. Additionally, Lloyd Taylor, who worked on Spies in Disguise and Nimona, provided the additional screenplay material for the film with Brandon Sawyer, making it the second film Taylor worked for DreamWorks after Trolls Band Together.

In January 2024, additional voice cast was announced, including Ike Barinholtz, Angela Bassett, Colin Hanks and Carla Gugino.

=== Animation ===
Mikros Animation, who previously worked with DreamWorks Animation on Captain Underpants: The First Epic Movie, provided the film's animation in their Paris and Bangalore facilities. Additional animation was done by Paris-based Jungler.

== Music ==
Orion and the Dark (Original Motion Picture Soundtrack)

Soundtrack album by Kevin Lax and Robert Lydecker
- Released: February 2, 2024
- Genre: Pop
- Length: 58:14
- Label: Back Lot

Orion and the Dark (Original Motion Picture Soundtrack) is the soundtrack album for the film. Kevin Lax and Robert Lydecker composed the film's score. The soundtrack was released by Back Lot Music on February 2, 2024, coinciding with the film's release.

All music is composed by Kevin Lax and Robert Lydecker.

No.	Title	Length
1.	"Meet Orion"	2:21
2.	"Permission Slip"	1:16
3.	"Walking Home From School"	0:44
4.	"Orion and the Dark"	0:26
5.	"Darkness Embodied"	1:04
6.	"Orion Meets Dark"	3:04
7.	"Swirling Chaos of Fears"	0:27
8.	"Hypatia Interrupts"	0:48
9.	"Open Your Eyes"	1:46
10.	"Buckle Up"	0:34
11.	"Sunshine"	1:05
12.	"Meet the Night Entities"	2:04
13.	"Dark, Light, and"	2:28
14.	"Insomnia"	1:35
15.	"Quiet and Unexplained Noises"	1:37
16.	"Dreams"	1:13
17.	"Irene's Dream"	1:07
18.	"Irene's Dream Goes Wrong"	3:12
19.	"Not Still Afraid"	1:27
20.	"City Walk"	1:55
21.	"Entities in Harmony"	0:34
22.	"Orion's Speech"	1:40
23.	"The Entities Abandon Dark"	1:50
24.	"Dark Surrenders to the Light"	1:45
25.	"Hypatia's Idea"	0:41
26.	"Hypatia's Poem"	1:58
27.	"Sweet Dreams, Orion"	1:28
28.	"Inside Orion's Dreamspace"	0:43
29.	"Dark in the Void"	4:10
30.	"Orion Awakes"	1:33
31.	"The Entities Return"	1:13
32.	"Orion's and Dark's Farewell"	1:37
33.	"Getting Hypatia Home"	1:45
34.	"Tycho's Rescue"	2:18
35.	"A Family Beneath the Stars"	2:10
36.	"Last Sketches"	2:36
Total length:		58:14

== Release ==
Orion and the Dark had its world premiere on January 27, 2024, as the opening night matinee of the TUDUM Theater presentation in Los Angeles.

The film was released on Netflix on February 2, 2024.

== Reception ==
=== Critical response ===
On the review aggregator website Rotten Tomatoes, 92% of 76 critics' reviews are positive, with an average rating of 7.1/10. The website's consensus reads: "An uncommonly ambitious animated film, Orion and the Dark benefits from a Charlie Kaufman screenplay that isn't afraid to tangle with existential ideas." Metacritic, which uses a weighted average, assigned the film a score of 72 out of 100, based on 23 critics, indicating "generally favorable" reviews.

=== Accolades ===
Award	Date of ceremony	Category	Recipient(s)	Result	Ref.
Annie Awards	February 8, 2025	Best Special Production	Orion and the Dark	Won	
Annie Awards	February 8, 2025	Outstanding Achievement for Production Design in an Animated Television / Broadcast Production	Timothy Lamb and Christine Bian	Nominated	
Annie Awards	February 8, 2025	Outstanding Achievement for Writing in an Animated Television / Broadcast Production	Charlie Kaufman	Won	
Astra TV Awards	December 8, 2024	Best Animated Series or TV Movie	Orion and the Dark	Nominated	
Astra TV Awards	December 8, 2024	Best Voice-Over Performance	Jacob Tremblay	Nominated	
Astra TV Awards	December 8, 2024	Best Voice-Over Performance	Paul Walter Hauser	Nominated	
Children's and Family Emmy Awards	March 15, 2025	Outstanding Animated Special	Bonnie Arnold, Walt Dohrn, Peter McCown, Ashley Laidlaw, Sean Charmatz, Charlie Kaufman and Kristin Brenner	Won	
Children's and Family Emmy Awards	March 15, 2025	Outstanding Voice Performer in a Children's or Young Teen Program	Paul Walter Hauser	Nominated	
Children's and Family Emmy Awards	March 15, 2025	Outstanding Younger Voice Performer in an Animated or Preschool Animated Program	Jacob Tremblay	Won	
Children's and Family Emmy Awards	March 15, 2025	Outstanding Casting for an Animated Program	Katie Galvan and Ania O'Hare	Nominated	
Children's and Family Emmy Awards	March 15, 2025	Outstanding Editing for an Animated Program	Kevin Sukho Lee	Won	
Children's and Family Emmy Awards	March 15, 2025	Outstanding Music Direction and Composition for an Animated Program	Kevin Lax, Robert Lydecker, Vivian Aguiar-Buff, Matt Manna and Alexandra Nickson	Nominated	
Children's and Family Emmy Awards	March 15, 2025	Outstanding Sound Editing and Sound Mixing for an Animated Program	Jessey Drake, Jeff Halbert, Marc Schmidt, D.J. Lynch, Rob McIntyre, Laria DeLeon, Matt Festle, Cat Gensler, Grace Stensland, Jason Oliver, Vincent Deng, Laura Macius and Roberto D. Alegria	Won	
Children's and Family Emmy Awards	March 15, 2025	Individual Achievement in Animation	Miho Tomimasu (Background Design)	Won	
Children's and Family Emmy Awards	March 15, 2025	Individual Achievement in Animation	Lauren Zurcher (Color)	Won	
Golden Reel Awards	February 23, 2025	Outstanding Achievement in Sound Editing – Non-Theatrical Animation	D.J. Lynch, Rob McIntyre, Jessey Drake, Jeff Halbert, Marc Schmidt, Evan Dockter, Cat Gensler, Grace Stensland, Jason Oliver, Roberto D. Alegria, Vincent Deng and Laura Macias	Nominated	
NAACP Image Awards	February 22, 2025	Outstanding Character Voice-Over Performance (Television)	Angela Bassett	Nominated	
