= Tim Johnson (film director) =

American animator and film director

- Born: August 27, 1961 (age 65); Chicago, Illinois, U.S.
- Education: Weinberg College of Arts and Sciences
- Occupations: Animator, storyboard artist, film director, film producer, television director
- Years active: 1985–present
- Employer: DreamWorks Animation (1996–2019)
- Notable work: Antz; Sinbad: Legend of the Seven Seas; Over the Hedge; Home

Tim Johnson is an American animator, film director, film producer, and television director. Johnson is best known for directing the DreamWorks animated films Antz, Sinbad: Legend of the Seven Seas, Over the Hedge, and Home.

== Life and career ==
Johnson was born in Chicago, Illinois. He studied at Northwestern University where he earned a BA in English Literature. He also produced two animated films; both of which earned Richter Grant Organization Awards.

Upon graduating, he worked for two years as a freelance animator and director. His introduction to computer animation came in 1985 while he worked on the staff at Post Effects in Chicago. He later joined Pacific Data Images in 1988 and two years later co-founded the studio's Character Animation Group. He also directed the first CG Pillsbury Doughboy commercial.

Johnson won two Annie awards on Antz and Over the Hedge, an Audience Award on Over the Hedge, and a Grand Prize for The Simpsons' "Treehouse of Horror VI".

While at DreamWorks Animation, he also directed Sinbad: Legend of the Seven Seas, Home, and the Christmas television special Kung Fu Panda Holiday, and additionally served as executive producer for How to Train Your Dragon and Abominable.

== Filmography ==
=== Film ===
Year	Title	Role
1998	Antz	Director
2000	Cyberworld	Director: Antz segment, Animation director: Homer3 segment
2003	Sinbad: Legend of the Seven Seas	Director
2006	Over the Hedge	Director
2006	Hammy's Boomerang Adventure	Creative consultant
2010	How to Train Your Dragon	Executive producer
2015	Home	Director
2019	Abominable	Executive producer

=== Television ===
Year	Title	Role
1995	The Simpsons's Treehouse of Horror VI	Computer animation director
2010	Kung Fu Panda Holiday	Director
2019	How To Train Your Dragon: Homecoming	Director
