= CTN Animation Expo =

Animation convention

CTN Animation Expo is an annual three day animation convention that focuses on putting "the talent" center stage. It is held at the Marriott Convention Center in Burbank, California during what is officially proclaimed by the City of Burbank to be "Animation Week" for this event. Founded by animation talent veteran Tina Price this event is presented by the Creative Talent Network. It was first held in 2009, from November 20 to 22.

== Participating Companies ==
- Blue Sky Animation Studios
- Cartoon Network
- Digital Domain Media
- DisneyToon Studios
- Disney Television Animation
- Dragonherder Entertainment
- DreamWorks Animation
- Duncan Studio
- Gentle Giant Studios
- Hasbro
- Jim Henson Studios
- Laika Animation Studios
- Nickelodeon
- Pepper Films
- Pixar
- Rhythm and Hues Studios
- Sony Pictures Animation
- Stone Circle Pictures
- Threshold Entertainment
- Walt Disney Animation Studios
