= Over the Hedge (comic strip) =

Comic strip

- 2017 comic strip header, featuring Verne the turtle (left) and RJ the raccoon (right)
- Author(s): Michael Fry; T. Lewis
- Website: gocomics.com/overthehedge
- Current status/schedule: Running
- Launch date: June 12, 1995
- Syndicate(s): United Feature Syndicate
- Genre(s): Humour; Gag-a-day

Over the Hedge is an American syndicated comic strip, written by Michael Fry, and drawn by T. Lewis. It tells the story of a raccoon, a turtle, a squirrel, and their friends, who come to terms with their woodlands being taken over, by suburbia, trying to survive the increasing flow of humanity and technology while becoming enticed by it at the same time. The strip debuted June 12, 1995.

The comic strip was adapted into the 2006 animated film Over the Hedge, produced by DreamWorks Animation.

== History ==
Cartoonists Michael Fry and T. Lewis began collaborating through an agent who represented both of them. At the time, Lewis was a children’s book illustrator, and Fry was a freelance writer. They originally conceived another comic strip called The Secret Life of Pigs, featuring two anthropomorphic pigs. This idea was rejected by editors, who thought that readers would not relate to the strip’s rural setting or the use of pigs as characters. In response, the two changed the lead characters to an ordinary raccoon and turtle, and in 1995, the strip was approved by United Feature Syndicate.

According to the Detroit Free Press, one factor in the strip’s initial success was the ending of Calvin and Hobbes in December 1995; when that strip ended, over 110 newspapers chose to run Over the Hedge as its replacement.

== Main characters ==
- RJ — RJ is a raccoon con artist. He takes pride in being extremely apathetic. He apparently envisions himself as an intellectual; however, his "facts" are obviously false. He is sometimes shown without a brain, using his brain cavity to store his "hanky" and breath mints. He loves to burgle human homes for food, as well as watch them, and their televisions, through the windows. He enjoys commenting on human life, and has studied humans, and knows their ways of getting food, and even has slightly imprinted on them. He was shown to care for Clara, even before she was born (after he learned that babies can hear some things outside of the mother from Verne) by reading The Hunchback of Notre-Dame, and singing a horrible version of "Stairway to Heaven". RJ is shown to have the ability to expand to fit a massive amount of food, and is known as "that horrible raccoon kid" on Halloween. His favourite food is Twinkies.
- Verne — Verne is a cautious, easy going, lactose abhorrent ornate box turtle, who is reflective, and prone to allergies. Verne is a true renaissance turtle, an intelligent and quick witted observer with a deep spiritual side and a tingling feeling in his tail when something is not right. He is one of the most caring characters (second to "The Tree That Knows Stuff"), but he sometimes lacks basic common sense. His proudest achievement is gathering all of the air conditioners out of Suburbia, and shouting, "LET THE GLOBAL COOLING COMMENCE!!!", just as RJ was about to plug them all in. He is a computer nerd, and he once "broke" the Internet. Most recently, his shell was used as a hotspot for Queen Izzy, the Ant Queen, and her ant subjects, forcing him to first wear one cereal box of Lucky Charms, and then one utilikilt.
- Hammy — A hyperactive Eastern gray squirrel, Hammy is the least intelligent, although also the most lovable character in the strip, spouting random comments at random moments. His comments usually state an unusually short lecture on a topic of little interest to the other characters. The character started the strip as "Hammy". He was later renamed as "Sammy", one continuity error that was assigned a fanciful explanation, when the film was in production, in May 2005. The character swapped places in December 2005, with his duplicate, also named "Hammy", from the other side of a mirror. RJ has addressed the character as "Hamilton".
- Clara — A human infant, who can speak to and understand the animals, with surprising intelligence. She gets along best with RJ, often adding insight to his plans.

== Film adaptation ==
An animated film adaptation, produced by DreamWorks Animation and distributed by Paramount Pictures, was released on May 19, 2006 (June 30, 2006 in Britain). The film adaptation features RJ befriending a group of woodlanders (two of whom are Hammy and Verne) and introducing them to suburbia, with an ulterior motive of helping him replenish the food supply he stole from a bear named Vincent.

Bruce Willis, Garry Shandling, Steve Carell, William Shatner, Wanda Sykes, Eugene Levy, Catherine O'Hara, and Nick Nolte star as RJ, Verne, Hammy, Ozzie (an opossum), Stella (a skunk), Lou and Penny (porcupines) and Vincent (a bear), respectively. The film features Avril Lavigne’s first major film role, as Heather, Ozzie's continuously embarrassed teenage daughter.

The film grossed $336 million worldwide. Following DreamWorks' acquisition by Comcast in 2016, the film's rights are now owned by Universal Pictures.
