= Sinbad: Legend of the Seven Seas =

2003 DreamWorks Animation animated film

- Theatrical release poster
- Directed by: Tim Johnson; Patrick Gilmore
- Written by: John Logan
- Based on: Sinbad the Sailor; Damon and Pythias
- Produced by: Mireille Soria; Jeffrey Katzenberg
- Starring: Brad Pitt; Catherine Zeta-Jones; Michelle Pfeiffer; Joseph Fiennes; Dennis Haysbert
- Edited by: Tom Finan
- Music by: Harry Gregson-Williams
- Production company: DreamWorks Animation
- Distributed by: DreamWorks Pictures (Note: In July 2014, the film's distribution rights were purchased by DreamWorks Animation from Paramount Pictures (owners of the pre-2005 DreamWorks Pictures catalog) and transferred to 20th Century Fox before reverting to Universal Pictures in 2018 following NBCUniversal's acquisition of DreamWorks Animation in 2016.)
- Release date: July 2, 2003
- Running time: 85 minutes
- Country: United States
- Language: English
- Budget: $60 million
- Box office: $80 million

Sinbad: Legend of the Seven Seas (or simply Sinbad) is a 2003 American animated fantasy adventure film directed by Tim Johnson and Patrick Gilmore and written by John Logan, featuring the character Sinbad. Produced by DreamWorks Animation and distributed by DreamWorks Pictures, it stars the voices of Brad Pitt, Catherine Zeta-Jones, Michelle Pfeiffer, Joseph Fiennes, and Dennis Haysbert. The film tells the story of Sinbad (voiced by Pitt), a pirate who travels the sea with his dog and his loyal crew, alongside Marina (voiced by Zeta-Jones), the fiancée of his childhood friend Prince Proteus (voiced by Fiennes), to recover the stolen Book of Peace from Eris (voiced by Pfeiffer) to save Proteus from approving Sinbad's death sentence.

Development began when Ted Elliott and Terry Rossio developed the story of Sinbad in the vein of the story of Damon and Pythias before settling on a love triangle. The project was canceled in 1993, though Jeffrey Katzenberg decided to restart some ideas when he left the Walt Disney Company and co-founded DreamWorks Pictures in 1994 during the production of The Prince of Egypt (1998). Johnson, who attempted to direct his follow-up CGI animated film Tusker following Antz (1998), before eventually scrapped the project, was recruited to direct Sinbad and teamed with Gilmore. Like the studio's previous film, Spirit: Stallion of the Cimarron (2002), the film combines traditional animation and computer animation. The film blends elements from One Thousand and One Nights and classical mythology. The film's traditional animation and its final line services were provided by Stardust Pictures and Bardel Entertainment, with PDI/DreamWorks handling its computer animation technology and CG character animation. The score for the film was composed by Harry Gregson-Williams.

Sinbad was released on July 2, 2003, and received mixed reviews from critics, who praised the animation, action sequences, and voice performances, but criticized the storyline, polarizing CGI, and the film's departure from its Arab origin. Grossing $80 million on a $60 million budget, Sinbad was considered by analysts to be a box-office failure, causing DreamWorks to suffer a $125 million loss on a string of films. The film is also listed as one of the biggest box-office bombs of all time, which nearly bankrupted the studio. To date, this remains the last DreamWorks Animation feature film to use traditional animation before the studio discontinued it in favor of computer animation. DreamWorks, however, brought 2D animation back for the short film Bird Karma in 2018. Until the releases of Rise of the Guardians and Ruby Gillman, Teenage Kraken in 2012 and 2023 respectively, Sinbad: Legend of the Seven Seas was DreamWorks Animation's biggest box office failure.

== Plot ==
Sinbad and his pirate crew attempt to steal the magical Book of Peace, which is en route to Syracuse, Sicily, and hold it for ransom as one last job before retiring to Fiji. Sinbad is surprised to see it is being protected by his childhood best friend, Prince Proteus of Syracuse. Sinbad tries stealing the Book anyway, but his attempt is foiled when Cetus attacks the ship. Sinbad and Proteus work together to fight Cetus and for a moment reaffirm their bond. Though the beast is defeated, Sinbad is dragged off the ship and into the sea.

Sinbad is saved by the goddess of discord, Eris, who offers him any boon he desires in exchange for the Book of Peace. Sinbad and his crew go to Syracuse to steal the Book, but after seeing Proteus with his fiancé Lady Marina, Sinbad abandons the mission. Anticipating this, Eris disguises herself as Sinbad and steals the Book herself. Sinbad is sentenced to death, but Proteus intervenes and sends Sinbad to retrieve the Book instead, placing himself as a hostage. Marina stows away to make sure that Sinbad succeeds, and the two quickly argue over Sinbad's flippant attitude towards Proteus' situation. To stop them, Eris sends a group of mythical sirens, who entrance Sinbad and his men with their hypnotic singing voices. Unaffected, Marina pilots the ship to safety and wins the favor of the crew. However, she and Sinbad continue to clash. Eris sees this disharmony and sends in a roc which captures Marina. She is rescued by Sinbad, and they successfully defeat the creature. Afterwards, the two reconcile.

After these and other incidents, Sinbad and Marina talk in a brief moment of peace — Marina reveals that she had always dreamed of a life on the sea, and Sinbad reveals that he distanced himself from Proteus 10 years earlier because he loved Marina. They reach and enter Eris' realm, where the goddess reveals that her plan was to maneuver Proteus into Sinbad's place, leaving Syracuse to collapse into chaos without an heir. Eris makes a deal with Sinbad: she will ask him whether he will return to Syracuse and accept his execution if he does not get the Book of Peace, and if he answers truthfully, she will surrender the Book. She gives him her word that she will honor the deal, which even a god cannot break. When he answers that he will return, Eris calls him a liar, and returns him and Marina to the mortal world. Ashamed, Sinbad admits that Eris is right, truly believing himself as a liar. Having fallen in love with Sinbad, Marina tearfully urges him to flee, which he seemingly does.

In Syracuse, Proteus readies himself to be beheaded, but at the last minute, Sinbad appears and takes his place. An enraged Eris appears and shatters the executioner's sword, saving Sinbad, then chastises him for returning. Sinbad realizes that this was part of her test and he has won by proving his answer true after all. Eris, furious but unable to go back on her word as a goddess, begrudgingly gives the Book to Sinbad, then leaves to sow chaos elsewhere. With the true culprit revealed, Sinbad is pardoned and allowed to go free.

With the Book of Peace restored to Syracuse, Proteus and Sinbad part as friends once more. Sinbad and his crew prepare to leave on another voyage, leaving Marina in Syracuse. Unknown to him, Proteus sees that Marina has fallen in love with Sinbad and life on the sea, and releases her from their engagement, sending her to join Sinbad's ship. Marina surprises Sinbad by revealing her presence on the ship just as it begins to sail, and the two kiss. Now together, they and the crew set out on another voyage as the ship sails into the sunset.

== Voice cast ==
- Brad Pitt as Sinbad, an Arab adventurous pirate and sailor who plans on retiring to Fiji.
- Catherine Zeta-Jones as Lady Marina, a Thracian ambassador to a fictional Syracuse, Proteus's fiancé, and Sinbad's love interest.
- Michelle Pfeiffer as Eris, the manipulative goddess of discord and chaos who wants to create destruction throughout the world.
- Joseph Fiennes as Prince Proteus of Syracuse, Sinbad's noble childhood-friend and Marina's fiancé.
- Dennis Haysbert as Kale, Sinbad's first mate and friend.
- Adriano Giannini as "Rat", an Italian lookout of Sinbad's crew.
- Timothy West as King Dymas of Syracuse, Proteus' father.
- Jim Cummings as Luca, an elderly member of Sinbad's crew.
  - Cummings also voices an ambassador who leads Sinbad's trial.
- Conrad Vernon as Jed, a comically heavily armed member of Sinbad's crew.
- Raman Hui as Jin, an Asian member of Sinbad's crew who frequently makes bets with Li.
- Chung Chan as Li, an Asian member of Sinbad's crew who frequently makes bets with Jin.
- Andrew Birch as Grum and Chum, members of Sinbad's crew.
- Harvey (uncredited) as Spike, Sinbad's pet Mastiff whom Marina grows a soft spot for.
- Chris Miller as Tower Guard.

== Production ==
=== Development ===
Shortly after co-writing Aladdin (1992) for Disney, screenwriters Ted Elliott and Terry Rossio came up with the idea of adapting the story of Sinbad the Sailor in the vein of the story of Damon and Pythias before settling on a love triangle. They wrote a treatment inspired by screwball romantic comedy films with Sinbad as a reserved apprentice cartographer who joins Peri, a free-spirited female smuggler, on an adventure and falls in love. The story was based largely on the Simbad comic book written and illustrated by Elena Poirier (1949–1956). In July 1992, Disney had announced they were adapting the story into a potential animated feature. The project was cancelled in 1993.

In 1994, Jeffrey Katzenberg had left Disney and co-founded DreamWorks SKG with Steven Spielberg and David Geffen. When The Prince of Egypt (1998) was in production, Katzenberg decided to restart some ideas that Disney had cancelled. Tim Johnson, who had directed Antz (1998), intended to direct his follow-up CGI animated film Tusker. Three years later, Shrek (2001) was released and because of the film's success, Katzenberg sat down with Johnson and proposed a more irreverent comedic approach to the project. Johnson explained, "There was so much success with this outrageous comedy [Shrek] that he didn't feel it was the right time to make a drama. So, Tusker got shelved." Johnson was later recruited to direct Sinbad and was teamed with Patrick Gilmore, a first-time director. Reflecting on the experience, Johnson stated the film "was a personal struggle" for him; he explained: "Making it was a joy. But it was a dramatic action adventure, and honestly, that's not where my instincts, sense of humor, and strengths are."

Shortly after writing the screenplay for Gladiator (2000), John Logan was approached by Katzenberg to write the script for an animated film. When he was offered the story of Sinbad, Logan researched the multiple tales of the character before settling on depicting the Greek and Roman versions. He described his first draft script as "very complex, the relationships were very adult. It was too intense in terms of the drama for the audience that this movie was aimed at."

=== Casting ===
Russell Crowe was originally set to voice Sinbad, but he dropped out due to scheduling conflicts. He was replaced by Brad Pitt, who wanted to make a film that his nieces and nephews could see. He explained, "They can't get into my movies. People's heads getting cut off, and all that." Pitt had already tried to narrate DreamWorks' previous animated film Spirit: Stallion of the Cimarron, but "it didn't work", with Matt Damon taking over the role. Pitt's purist intentions worried him that his Missourian accent would not be suitable for the Middle Eastern character, but was persuaded by the filmmakers that his accent would lighten the mood.

Michelle Pfeiffer, who voices Eris, the Goddess of Discord, had struggles with pinning down the character's personality, initially finding her "too sexual," and then too dull. After the third rewrite, Pfeiffer called Jeffrey Katzenberg and told him, "You know, you really can fire me," but he assured her that this was part of the process.

=== Animation ===
In January 2001, it was reported that DreamWorks Animation would completely transfer their animation workflow into using the Linux operating system. Previously, their animation and rendering software had used Silicon Graphics Image servers and workstations, but as their hardware began to show slowness, DreamWorks began looking for an alternate platform for superior optimal performance in order to save hardware costs. In 2002, they decided to partner with Hewlett-Packard for a three-year deal for which they used their dual-processor HP workstations and ProLiant servers running Red Hat Linux software. Starting with Spirit: Stallion of the Cimarron (2002), they had replaced its entire render farm with x86-based Linux servers.

Sinbad: Legend of the Seven Seas was the first DreamWorks Animation production to completely utilize Linux software, with more than 250 workstations used. Starting with storyboards, the artists first drew sketches on paper to visualize the scene, which were later edited into animatics. For the character animation, rough character sketches were passed through the ToonShooter software, which digitized the sketches. From that point, the animators were able to easily integrate the animation into existing scenes. Production software lead Derek Chan explained, "ToonShooter is an internal tool we wrote for Linux. It captures low resolution 640 × 480 line art that the artists use to time the film." The animated characters were then digitally colored using the Linux software application, InkAndPaint.

For the visual effects, DreamWorks Animation had used Alias Maya to create water effects. However, the rendering was found to be too photorealistic, and senior software engineer for advanced R&D future films Galen Gornowicz sought to modify the effects so as to closely match the movie's visual development renderings. Craig Ring, who served as digital supervisor on the film, described four major approaches to water used in the film: compositing ripple distortion over the painted backgrounds; creating fluid simulation; developing a rapid slashing technique to create a surface and then send ripples through the surface; and better integrating the 3D visual effects with stylized, hand drawn splashes.

The film's traditional animation and its final line services were provided by Stardust Pictures and Bardel Entertainment, with PDI/DreamWorks handling its computer animation technology and CG character animation.

It is the last DreamWorks Animation film to feature the 1997 DreamWorks Pictures opening logo. This logo had been used on both live-action and animated DreamWorks films up until that point. In the following year, a specifically made logo for films from DreamWorks Animation debuted.

== Release ==
=== Marketing ===
A PC game based on the film was released by Atari, who worked closely with one of the film's directors, Patrick Gilmore. It was released before the VHS and DVD release of the film. Burger King released six promotional toys at the time of the film's release, and each toy came with a "Constellation Card". Hasbro produced a series of Sinbad figures as part of its G.I. Joe action figure brand. The figures were 12" tall and came with a mythical monster.

=== Home media ===
Sinbad: Legend of the Seven Seas was released on DVD and VHS on November 18, 2003, by DreamWorks Home Entertainment. The DVD included a six-minute interactive short animated film Cyclops Island, featuring an encounter with the eponymous Cyclopes.

In February 2006, Paramount Pictures acquired the rights to all live-action films DreamWorks had released between 1997 and 2005, following Viacom's $1.6 billion acquisition of the company's live-action film assets and television assets. Additionally, Paramount signed a six-year distribution agreement for past and future DreamWorks Animation films, with DreamWorks Animation having spun off into a separate company from the live-action division in 2004.

On December 31, 2012, DreamWorks Animation's distribution agreement with Paramount officially ended. In July 2014, the distribution rights to the DreamWorks Animation catalog were purchased back by DreamWorks Animation from Paramount and transferred to new distribution partner 20th Century Fox. Fox's distribution rights reverted to Universal Pictures in 2018, two years after NBCUniversal's $3.8 billion acquisition of DreamWorks Animation in 2016. Universal Pictures Home Entertainment subsequently released the film on Blu-ray Disc on June 4, 2019, with the Cyclops Island short removed.

==== Cyclops Island ====
Cyclops Island (also known as Sinbad and the Cyclops Island) is a traditionally animated interactive short film that acts as a sequel to Sinbad: Legend of the Seven Seas, taking place shortly after the events of the previous film.

Instead of travelling to Fiji, Sinbad and his crew decide to spend their vacation on the tropical island of Krakatoa. While attempting to find a source of fresh water on the island, Marina and Spike run into a tribe of Cyclopes who they have to defeat with the help of Sinbad, Kale, and Rat. When Sinbad dislodges a large boulder during the fight, a volcano erupts and the island goes down in flames. Marina then suggests looking for a nicer destination for their next holiday, such as Pompeii.

While watching the short film on DVD, the viewer can choose to follow different characters to see different angles of the same story. The viewer can follow Sinbad, the duo of Kale and Rat, Marina, or Spike. Brad Pitt, Catherine Zeta-Jones, Dennis Haysbert, and Adriano Giannini all reprised their roles from the original film. On the film's VHS release, the short film takes place after the movie ends but before the credits roll, and is shown in its entirety.

== Reception ==
=== Critical response ===
On the review aggregator website Rotten Tomatoes, Sinbad: Legend of the Seven Seas has an approval rating of 45% based on 127 reviews with an average rating of 5.63/10. The site's consensus reads: "Competent, but not magical." Metacritic, which assigns a normalized rating, has a score of 48 based on 33 reviews, indicating "mixed or average reviews". Audiences polled by CinemaScore gave the film an average grade of "A−" on an A+ to F scale.

Kirk Honeycutt of The Hollywood Reporter praised the film, writing that "Sinbad is a cartoon that does what matinée [afternoon showings] moviemakers of old never had the resources to do: allow their imagination to run amok in an ancient world that never existed ― but should have." He praised the animation and backgrounds as "lushly rendered by the animation artists, displaying details not only from the world according to Ray Harryhausen; but from the Greco-Roman world and Middle East. As with all good animation, these serve as backdrops to the comedy and adventure the characters encounter every second." Roger Ebert of the Chicago Sun-Times gave the film three-and-a-half stars, concluding that "Sinbad: Legend of the Seven Seas is another worthy entry in the recent renaissance of animation, and in the summer that has already given us Finding Nemo, it's a reminder that animation is the most liberating of movie genres, freed of gravity, plausibility, and even the matters of lighting and focus. There is no way that Syracuse could exist outside animation, and as we watch it, we are sailing over the edge of the human imagination."

Claudia Puig, reviewing for USA Today, summarized that "Sinbad is a swashbuckling adventure saga that probably will appeal more to older kids. But it's not a wondrous tale. The effects are competent, the action has exciting moments, and the story is interesting enough, but the parts don't add up to a compelling sum." Todd McCarthy of Variety wrote, "A passably entertaining animated entry from DreamWorks that's closer to The Road to El Dorado than to Shrek, Sinbad: Legend of the Seven Seas tries too strenuously to contemporize ancient settings and characters for the sake of connecting with modern kids." Elvis Mitchell of The New York Times panned the film, suggesting the film featured a "boatload of celebrities slumming through another not-quite-thawed adventure story." Additionally, he claimed "more thought and care were lavished on the design of the monsters than on the hand-drawn lead characters, who have the same kind of sketchy features as the stars of those animated Bible story cartoons sold on late-night infomercials."

There was additional criticism for the film's departure from its Arab origin. Jack Shaheen, a critic of Hollywood's portrayal of Arabs, believed that "the studio feared financial and possibly political hardships if they made the film's hero Arab", and claimed that "if no attempt is made to challenge negative stereotypes about Arabs, the misperceptions continue. It's regrettable that the opportunity wasn't taken to change them, especially in the minds of young people." At one point, Shaheen asked Katzenberg to include some references to Arab culture in the film. According to Shaheen, "he didn't seem surprised that I mentioned it, which presumably means that it was discussed early on in the development of the film."

=== Box office ===
On the film's opening weekend, the film earned $6.9 million and $10 million since its Wednesday start. It reached sixth place at the box office and faced early competition from Terminator 3: Rise of the Machines, Legally Blonde 2: Red, White & Blonde, Charlie's Angels: Full Throttle, 2 Fast 2 Furious, Finding Nemo, Rugrats Go Wild, and Hulk. The week after its release, the similarly themed film Pirates of the Caribbean: The Curse of the Black Pearl premiered, in which Sinbad grossed $4.3 million finishing seventh. The film closed on October 9, 2003, after earning $26.5 million in the United States and Canada and $54.3 million overseas, for a worldwide total of $80.7 million.

The box office failure of Sinbad caused a loss of $125 million for DreamWorks Animation. When speaking of the disappointment, Katzenberg commented, "I think the idea of a traditional story being told using traditional animation is likely a thing of the past."

== Soundtrack ==
The score was composed by Harry Gregson-Williams, in his fourth collaboration with DreamWorks Animation, following Antz (1998), Chicken Run (2000), and Shrek (2001), as well as his first film that he composed solely by himself for the studio, since he previously worked with John Powell on all three of those films. It is also the only DreamWorks hand-drawn film to not have music composed by Hans Zimmer, who previously composed The Prince of Egypt (1998), The Road to El Dorado (2000; with Powell), and Spirit: Stallion of the Cimarron (2002). The soundtrack was released on June 24, 2003, by DreamWorks Records. In November 2003, DreamWorks Records was sold to Universal Music Group, making it the last DreamWorks soundtrack album released while the music division was still part of the same company as the film division.

== Video game ==
A video game based on the film developed by Small Rockets and published by Atari was released on October 21, 2003, for Microsoft Windows.
