= Michael Fry (cartoonist) =

American cartoonist

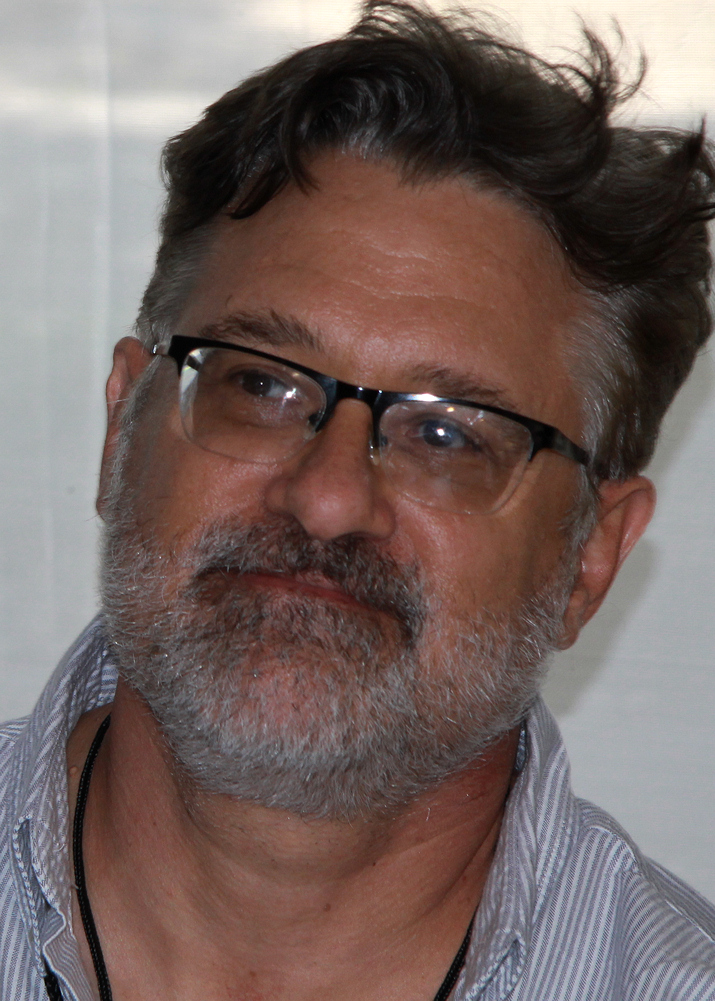
- Michael Fry at the 2014 Texas Book Festival.
- Born: August 16, 1959 (age 67); Minneapolis, Minnesota, U.S.
- Occupation: Cartoonist
- Known for: Committed and Over the Hedge comic strips

Michael Fry (born August 16, 1959) is an American cartoonist, online media entrepreneur, and screenwriter.

== Career ==
He is best known for the syndicated comic strips Committed and Over the Hedge, the latter of which is a collaboration with T. Lewis. Over the Hedge was nominated for best newspaper strip by the National Cartoonists Society in 2006.

Fry was also President of RingTales, an online media company. RingTales's animated New Yorker cartoons were nominated for a Webby Award in 2008. Fry started cartooning professionally at The Houston Post with the local daily comic strip, Scotty. His work has appeared in Playboy, Good Housekeeping, The Texas Observer, and many other publications.

As of 2013 Fry is the author and illustrator of the middle-grade illustrated novel series "The Odd Squad" for Disney-Hyperion. Three books were released in 2013/2014: The Odd Squad: Bully Bait, The Odd Squad: Zero Tolerance, and The Odd Squad: King Karl.
