= Motor Mash =

1997 video game

- Developer: Eutechnyx
- Publishers: UK: Ocean Software; EU: Infogrames
- Platforms: PlayStation, Windows, MS-DOS
- Release: PlayStation; November 1997; MS-DOS, Windows: UK: 1998; EU: 1999
- Genre: Racing
- Modes: Single-player, multiplayer

Motor Mash is a racing video game developed by Eutechnyx and published in 1997 by Ocean Software in the United Kingdom and Infogrames in Europe for the PlayStation, Windows, and MS-DOS. Played from a top down perspective, players compete in races as cartoon-like characters. Motor Mash received mixed reviews, with some praising the visuals and variety of tracks, but many considering the game was too similar to the Micro Machines series and had poor camera control.

== Gameplay ==
Gameplay screenshot

Players race across 48 tracks set in six themed environments, including City, Wild West, Nightmare, Atlantis, Arctic and Jungle. Players select one of twelve different characters, each with their own vehicle and different handling. Power-ups are distributed around courses, which when collected by the player by driving over it, can provide offensive weapons or boosts. The game supports a local multiplayer mode for two to four players. in which players must push their opponents off the track to win a race.

== Development ==
The game was developed by Eutechnyx, whose lead programmer Ian Copeland had previously developed Micro Machines and Micro Machines 2: Turbo Tournament for the Super NES. The game received separate releases for PlayStation, MS-DOS, and Windows. The Windows version has higher resolution and 3D acceleration.

== Reception ==
Reception

Review scores
Publication	Score
Computer and Video Games	2/5
PlayStation Official Magazine – UK	6/10
PlayStation Plus	68%
PlayStation Pro	7.5/10
Total PlayStation	67%

Most critics compared the game's similarities to the Micro Machines series and Micro Machines V3, Motor Mash was assessed as unoriginal, with Total Playstation stating it was "all too familiar" and "more than a rehash", and Computer and Video Games finding the game lacked surprises and offered little new compared to previous titles in the genre. Considering the game "far from great", PlayStation Plus enjoyed the graphics, but critiqued the game for being "too slow to be exciting". Several reviews critiqued the game's camera angles and track objects for obscuring the player's view. However, Official UK PlayStation Magazine praised the gameplay as "fun, fast and furious" and both it and PlayStation Pro commended the variety of tracks and weapons.
