= Rex Grignon =

Canadian-American animation director and entrepreneur

- Born: June 11, 1962 (age 63)
- Occupation: Co-founder
- Employer: Nimble Collective

Rex Grignon (born June 11, 1962) is a Canadian-American animation director and entrepreneur. Grignon received his animation training at Sheridan College where he graduated in 1984. He then earned his bachelor's degree in 1985 from New York Institute of Technology. He worked in Europe for two years as a staff animator and Art Director in Frankfurt and Paris, mostly working on early 3D commercials and broadcast graphics. Grignon moved to the U.S. in 1988 where he worked for Pacific Data Images as a Senior Animator and co-founded PDI's Character Animation Group with Tim Johnson.

After founding the Character Animation Group, he worked for two years with Jim Henson and Frank Oz at the Jim Henson Company as lead animator. Grignon briefly left PDI to work at Pixar as an animator on Toy Story. After PDI was bought by DreamWorks Animation, Grignon worked as the Head of Character Animation on such films as Antz, Shrek, Madagascar, Madagascar: Escape 2 Africa, and Madagascar 3: Europe's Most Wanted.

In 2006 Grignon was accepted into the Academy of Motion Picture Arts and Sciences—the Oscars—for his contributions to the field of animation.

He was awarded the first ever Distinguished Alumnus Award, Animation from Sheridan College in 2007 and won the 2013 Premier's Award for Creative Arts and Design.

Grignon was the lead designer of Premo, the animation software developed at DreamWorks Animation. In 2018 Premo won a Technical Achievement Award from The Academy of Motion Picture Arts and Sciences.

Grignon is currently the CEO of Nimble Collective, which he co-founded in 2014 with DreamWorks alumni Jason Schleifer, Bruce Wilson and Scott LaFleur.

== Filmography ==
| Year | Title | Credits |
|---|---|---|
| 1989 | The Jim Henson Hour (TV series) | animator |
| 1991 | Muppet*Vision 3-D (short) | lead animator |
| 1991 | The Last Halloween (TV short) | lead animator |
| 1994 | Angels in the Outfield | animator |
| 1995 | Toy Story | anmator |
| 1998 | Antz | supervising animator |
| 2000 | CyberWorld (short) | chief animator |
| 2001 | Shrek | additional supervising animator |
| 2001 | Shrek in the Swamp Karaoke Dance Party (video short) | supervising animator |
| 2003 | Sinbad: Legend of the Seven Seas | CG character animator |
| 2005 | Madagascar | head of character animation |
| 2005 | The Madagascar Penguins in a Christmas Caper (short) | head of character animation |
| 2008 | Kung Fu Panda | additional animation |
| 2008 | Madagascar: Escape 2 Africa | head of character animation |
| 2012 | Madagascar 3: Europe's Most Wanted | head of character animation |
| 2014 | Rocky and Bullwinkle (short) | supervising animator |
| 2017 | Coin Operated (short) | animation supervisor |
