= Brad Lewis =

American film producer

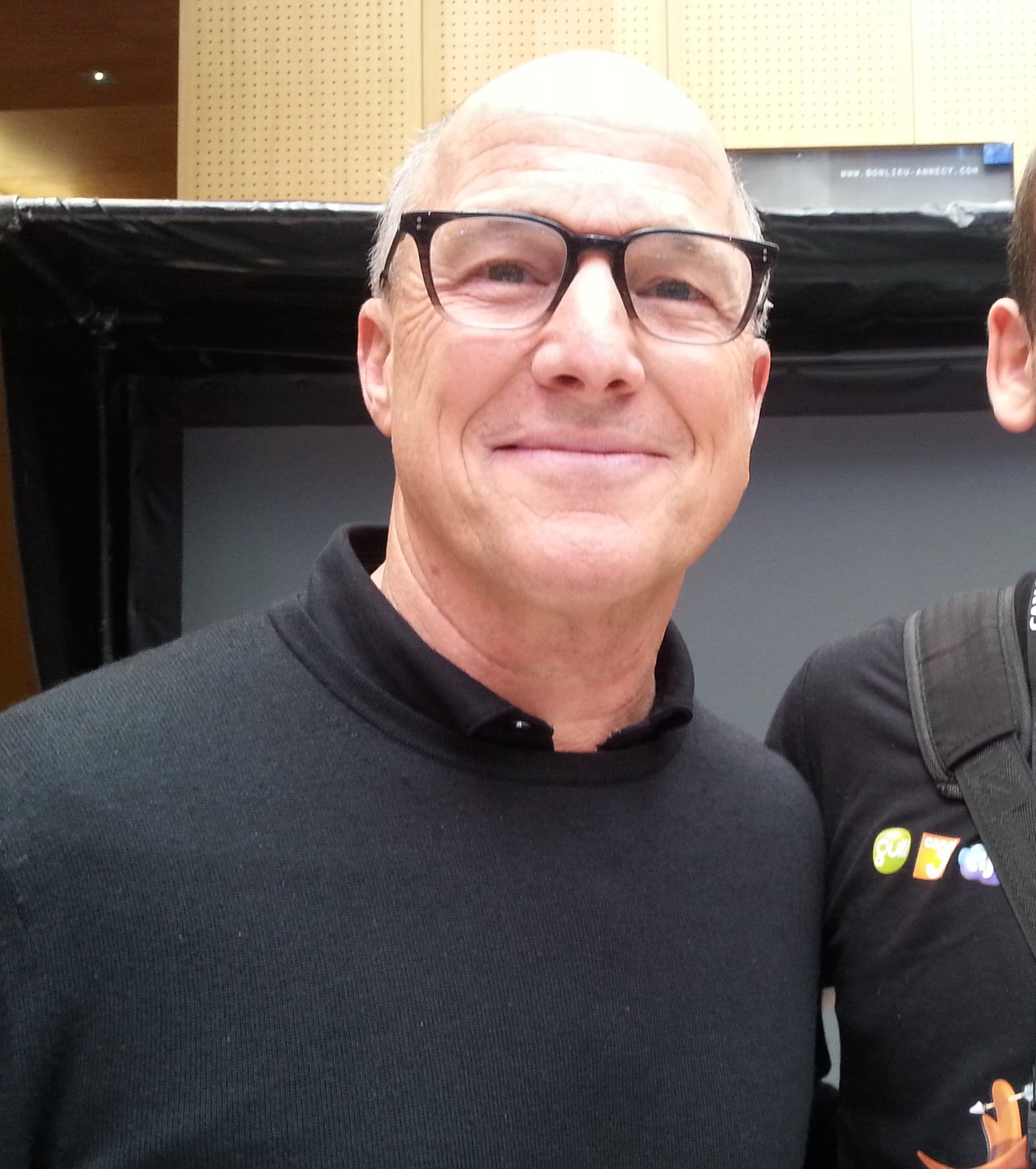
- Lewis at the 2016 Annecy International Animated Film Festival
- Born: April 29, 1958 (age 68); Sacramento County, California, U.S.
- Education: California State University, Fresno (BA)
- Occupations: Film producer, director, writer, politician

Bradford Clark Lewis (born April 29, 1958) is an American film producer, director, writer and politician. He produced the second computer animated film in history Antz, the Oscar-winning Ratatouille, Storks, and was also nominated for an Academy Award for producing How to Train Your Dragon: The Hidden World. He also co-directed Cars 2 for Pixar. He is a two-time Emmy winner for his work on The Last Halloween and ABC's Monday Night Football. He is a former mayor of the city of San Carlos, California.

== Personal life ==
Lewis was born in Sacramento County, California. He was raised in San Mateo, California and moved to nearby San Carlos in 1991. Lewis graduated from Fresno State University with a Bachelor of Arts in Theatre, and lives in Durham, North Carolina. Brad has two children, Jackson and Ella, and is married to Andrea McCarthy Lewis.

== Career ==
=== Pacific Data Images ===
For over thirteen years Lewis worked at Pacific Data Images (PDI), a computer animation and visual effects production company. He served as executive Producer and Vice President of Production, and lead the expansion of the partnership with DreamWorks SKG.

Prior to PDI while working in NYC, he produced, designed and directed computer graphics for ESPN and Showtime. He also was the executive in charge of visual effects at VCA Teletronics and worked with the top advertising agencies.

Lewis produced many commercials and visual effects for feature films while at PDI. Of his many "firsts" in computer animation he produced The Bud Bowl, Pillsbury Doughboy, Hamburger Helper amongst many others television specials. In 1991 he received a Sports Emmy Awards for graphic design on ABC's Monday Night Football. In 1992 he won a Primetime Emmy Award for Outstanding Special Visual Effects on The Last Halloween, for which Hanna-Barbera used CGI animation instead of traditional animation for the first time. In 1995 Lewis produced "Treehouse of Horror VI", the first 3D episode of The Simpsons, with a three-dimensional Homer Simpson.

Lewis then served as producer on films such as Broken Arrow (1996), The Arrival (1996), The Peacemaker (1997), Antz (1998) and Forces of Nature (1999). He was to direct the cancelled animated film Tusker with Tim Johnson. Lewis left the company shortly after it was purchased by DreamWorks SKG in 2000.

Additionally, Lewis' commercial production work netted him two Clios.

=== Pixar ===
Brad Lewis joined Pixar in November 2001; his first credit was on The Incredibles as an actor. He served as producer on Ratatouille in 2007 and later went on to co-direct Cars 2 in 2011. He co-directed the English voice version of Hayao Miyazaki's Ponyo in 2009.

=== Recent ===
Lewis left Pixar to join Digital Domain in 2011, at their Tradition Studios division in Florida where he was to direct animated features. After Digital Domain's bankruptcy filing and their shutdown and layoffs at Tradition Studios, Lewis joined Warner Bros. as a producer. He produced Storks which was released on September 23, 2016, and was executive producer on The Lego Batman Movie. Lewis returned to DreamWorks Animation to produce How to Train Your Dragon: The Hidden World.

After leaving Warner Bros, he Co-founded Spire Animation Studios with PJ Gunsagar and developed two feature films, Trouble and Century Goddess. He partnered with CAA and Epic Games.

== Local politics ==
Lewis served five years on the San Carlos Parks & Recreation Commission before being elected to the city's council in 2005. He became vice-mayor in 2006, and mayor in 2007. He served in the San Carlos City Council in 2010.

== Filmography ==
=== Feature films ===
Year	Title	Director	Story	Producer	Other	Notes
1995	Bushwhacked	No	No	Executive	No	
1996	Broken Arrow	No	No	Executive	No	
1996	The Arrival	No	No	No	Yes	Visual Effects, Executive Producer - PDI
1997	A Simple Wish	No	No	No	Yes	Visual Effects, Executive Producer - PDI
1997	The Peacemaker	No	No	No	Yes	Visual Effects, Executive Producer - PDI
1998	Antz	No	No	Yes	No	
1999	Forces of Nature	No	No	No	Yes	Visual Effects, Executive Producer - PDI
2004	The Incredibles	No	No	No	Yes	Additional Voices
2007	Ratatouille	No	No	Yes	Yes	Additional Voices
2009	Ponyo	No	No	No	Yes	Director: English Dub, US Version
2011	Cars 2	Co-Director	Yes	No	Yes	Voice of Tubbs Pacer
2016	Storks	No	No	Yes	No	
2017	The Lego Batman Movie	No	No	Executive	No	
2019	How to Train Your Dragon: The Hidden World	No	No	Yes	No	

=== Short Films and Television ===
Year	Title	Producer	Notes
1991	The Last Halloween	Executive	Executive Producer: PDI
1995	The Simpsons: Treehouse of Horror VI	Executive	Executive Producer: PDI
2007	Your Friend the Rat	Executive	
2016	Pigeon Toady's Guide to Your New Baby	Yes	

=== Other Credits ===
Year	Title	Role
2001	Shrek	Special Thanks
2007	Guys Choice	Consultant
2009	Tracy	Doug Howard
2016	Blood Sombrero	Thanks
