= Wrecked: Revenge Revisited =

2012 video game

- Developer: Supersonic Software
- Publisher: 505 Games
- Platforms: PlayStation Network, Xbox Live Arcade
- Release: 28 March 2012
- Genres: Vehicular combat, racing
- Modes: Single-player, multiplayer

Wrecked: Revenge Revisited (previously known as Gas: Fuel for Fun) is a 2012 vehicular combat racing video game developed by Supersonic Software and published by 505 Games for PlayStation Network and Xbox Live Arcade, but the PS3 release is only available in the PAL region.

== Reception ==
Reception

Aggregate score
Aggregator	Score	
Aggregator	PS3	Xbox 360
Metacritic	64/100	57/100

Review scores
Publication	Score	
Publication	PS3	Xbox 360
Eurogamer	N/A	4/10
GamesMaster	62%	N/A
GamesTM	N/A	4/10
Hyper	N/A	9/10
IGN	7.5/10	7.5/10
PlayStation Official Magazine – Australia	7/10	N/A
PlayStation Official Magazine – UK	6/10	N/A
Official Xbox Magazine (UK)	N/A	5/10
Official Xbox Magazine (US)	N/A	3.5/10
Metro	N/A	7/10

Wrecked: Revenge Revisited received "mixed" reviews on both platforms according to the review aggregation website Metacritic.

== See also ==
- Mashed: Drive to Survive
