= Micro Machines V3 =

1997 video game

- European PlayStation box art
- Developers: Codemasters; Novalicious (GBC)
- Publishers: EU: Codemasters; NA: Midway; WW: THQ (GBC)
- Series: Micro Machines
- Platforms: PlayStation, Microsoft Windows, Nintendo 64, Game Boy Color
- Release: 21 March 1997: PlayStation; EU: 21 March 1997; NA: 9 January 1998 Windows; EU: 1998 Nintendo 64; NA: 29 March 1999; EU: 23 April 1999 Game Boy Color; NA: 7 November 2000; EU: 24 November 2000
- Genre: Racing
- Modes: Single-player, multiplayer

Micro Machines V3 is a racing video game developed by Codemasters, the third title of the Micro Machines series following Micro Machines 2: Turbo Tournament (1994) and the first set in a 3D game environment. It was originally released for PlayStation in 1997 followed by ports to Microsoft Windows, Nintendo 64 (as Micro Machines 64 Turbo) in 1999, and a 2D version for Game Boy Color in 2000.

== Development and release ==
A Sega Saturn version of the game was demonstrated at the 1996 Electronic Entertainment Expo, at which time Codemasters stated that they were hoping to release the PlayStation and Saturn versions simultaneously. However, in mid-1997 they announced that development on the Saturn version had been halted.

Initially Micro Machines V3 was published only in Europe, but in late 1997 Midway acquired the U.S. distribution rights and announced a November 1997 U.S. release for the PlayStation version.

An N64 port of Micro Machines V3 was released in 1999 titled Micro Machines 64 Turbo. Like the PlayStation version, this port lets 8 people play simultaneously while using a Pad Share, where one person uses one side of the controller, steering with the Directional pad, while the other player uses the four C-buttons on the N64. The vehicles accelerate automatically in these modes. A Micro Machines vehicle was packaged with each copy.

The Game Boy Color version was developed by Novalicious, with THQ publishing.

== Reception ==
Reception

Aggregate score
Aggregator	Score			
Aggregator	GBC	N64	PC	PS
GameRankings	85%	73%	N/A	78%

Review scores
Publication	Score			
Publication	GBC	N64	PC	PS
Consoles +	92%	90%	N/A	94%
Edge	N/A	N/A	8/10	8/10
Electronic Gaming Monthly	N/A	8.5/10; 9/10; 7/10; 8.5/10	N/A	8.5/10; 5/10; 8/10; 7/10
Game Informer	N/A	7/10	N/A	8/10
GameFan	N/A	92/100; 90/100; 72/100; 82/100	N/A	94%
GamePro	N/A	3.5/5; 2.5/5; 4/5; 3.5/5	N/A	N/A
GameRevolution	N/A	N/A	N/A	B
GameSpot	N/A	6.2/10	N/A	5.7/10
Hyper	N/A	84%	N/A	91%
IGN	9/10	8.6/10	N/A	8.7/10
N64 Magazine	N/A	86%	N/A	N/A
Next Generation	N/A	N/A	N/A	4/5
Nintendo Power	N/A	4.6/10	N/A	N/A
Official U.S. PlayStation Magazine	N/A	N/A	N/A	5/5

Micro Machines V3 received divisive reviews. While critics uniformly praised the detailed, imaginative tracks and multitude of play modes, they disagreed on whether the game provides any lasting fun, with the multiplayer modes being a particular sticking point. IGN and Next Generation regarded it as the highlight of the game, with IGN reporting that the competitiveness of the multiplayer was able to get "a huge crowd of jaded IGN hacks to gather around a single TV screen and scream and shout at one another" and Next Generation calling Micro Machines V3 "One of the few truly great multiplayer PlayStation games." On the other side, Electronic Gaming Monthly (EGM), GameSpot, and GamePro found the multiplayer irritating and confusing to the point of being almost unplayable. Crispin Boyer and Kraig Kujawa of EGM said the camera views, in particular the restriction to one screen, make it too easy to lose track of what's going on, while their co-reviewer Sushi-X found the entire concept of competing to fall off ledges the least number of times was not fun. GamePro expressed irritation with how the multiplayer races stop and restart every time someone wipes out or gets too far ahead of a competitor. GameSpot agreed, and reasoned that "While a split-screen mode would be likewise untenable, this inching along clearly sucks unless all drivers involved are incredibly (or equally) proficient."

Despite his strong dislike for the multiplayer, Boyer recommended Micro Machines V3 on the strength of the single-player mode, especially the course design. Kujawa, however, felt even the single-player becomes too repetitious to have lasting appeal. GameSpot agreed that the game's charm quickly wears off with the monotony of the gameplay, and GamePro concluded that "It might seem strange that a game with bright graphics, equally solid sound, responsive controls, and a clever premise could be so little fun, but it's the frustrating gameplay and design flaws that keep Micro Machines V3 in the pits." IGN instead hailed it as an outstanding party game, not only for the multiplayer action but for features such as the ability to compete for each other's cars. Next Generation similarly said that in conjunction with the outstanding multiplayer, the varied yet always responsive controls of the different vehicles and the imaginative track design make it a great title.

On the review aggregation website GameRankings, the PlayStation version held a score of 78% based on 13 reviews, Micro Machines 64 Turbo held a score of 73% based on 8 reviews, and the Game Boy Color version held an 85% based on 4 reviews.

The game topped the UK game charts when it was released in March, becoming number one just two days after its release.
