= Circuit Breakers (video game) =

1998 video game

- Developer: Supersonic Software
- Publisher: Mindscape
- Engine: RenderWare (PS2)
- Platform: PlayStation
- Release: UK: 10 July 1998; NA: 2 September 1998
- Genre: Racing
- Modes: Single-player, multiplayer

Circuit Breakers is a 1998 racing game developed by Supersonic Software and published by Mindscape for the PlayStation. It is the sequel to Supersonic Racers.

It was the first (and possibly only) PlayStation title ever to receive expansion packs through Demo discs released with Official UK PlayStation Magazine.

A remake for the PlayStation 2 was released in Europe only under the name Circuit Blasters in 2005 by Metro3D Europe.

== Reception ==
Reception

Aggregate score
Aggregator	Score
GameRankings	73%

Review scores
Publication	Score
AllGame	2/5
CNET Gamecenter	7/10
Edge	8/10
Electronic Gaming Monthly	8.375/10
GameSpot	3.7/10
IGN	8/10
Next Generation	4/5
PlayStation Official Magazine – UK	9/10
Official U.S. PlayStation Magazine	3/5
PlayStation: The Official Magazine	4/5

The game received average reviews according to the review aggregation website GameRankings. Some magazines gave it favourable reviews while it was still in development. Edge gave it a favourable review over a month before it was released in Europe. Next Generation said, "If you possess a multitap and three willing friends, this game should be at the very top of your 'must buy' list." However, GameSpot gave the European version a negative review, a few months before it was released Stateside. GamePro gave it a negative review, saying, The only fun to be had with this Micro Machines–style game is in the mildly entertaining multiplayer matches." (Note: GamePro gave the game 2.5/5 for graphics, and three 2/5 scores for sound, control, and fun factor.)

Official UK PlayStation Magazine included the game on their official top 10 PlayStation games of all-time list.
