= Jason Schleifer =

American animator

- Occupation: Co-founder
- Employer: Nimble Collective

Jason Schleifer is an American animator, character technical director, and entrepreneur. Schleifer started his career at Alias/Wavefront where he was a product specialist during the development of Maya. His technical expertise in character rigging led him to work as a character technical director and eventually animation lead at Weta Digital where he helped create and animate the character, Gollum for the Lord of the Rings trilogy. In 2003 Schleifer moved back to the U.S. to work at PDI/DreamWorks in Redwood City, CA where he became Head of Character Animation and worked on feature films including Madagascar, Over the Hedge, Megamind, and Mr. Peabody & Sherman.

Jason Schleifer has a B.A. in High Honors from the University of California, Santa Barbara. He also received an Honorary Doctorate of Animation from the Digital Media Arts College in Boca Raton, Florida.

In 2014 Schleifer co-founded Nimble Collective with DreamWorks alumni Rex Grignon, Bruce Wilson and Scott LaFleur.

== Filmography ==
Year	Title	Credits
1998	Bingo (short)	additional character animation
2001	The Lord of the Rings: The Fellowship of the Ring	creature technical director
2002	The Lord of the Rings: The Two Towers	senior animator
2003	The Lord of the Rings: The Return of the King	animation lead
2005	Madagascar	animator
2005	The Madagascar Penguins in a Christmas Caper	animator
2006	Over the Hedge	animator
2007	Shrek the Third	animator
2008	Madagascar: Escape 2 Africa	supervising animator
2009	Monsters vs. Aliens	character development
2010	Megamind	head of character animation
2011	Megamind: The Button of Doom (video short)	head of character animation
2011	Night of the Living Carrots (video short)	supervising animator
2014	Mr. Peabody & Sherman	head of character animation
2014	Rocky and Bullwinkle (short)	head of character animation
2017	The Boss Baby	head of character animation (pre-production)
2017	Disrupted (short)	animator
2017	Coin Operated (short)	animator
