= Mashed (video game) =

2004 video game

- Developer: Supersonic Software
- Publishers: Empire Interactive (Europe); D3 Publisher (Japan); Vivendi Games (North America)
- Engine: RenderWare
- Platforms: PlayStation 2, Xbox, Microsoft Windows
- Release: Original; PlayStation 2, Xbox: EU: 18 June 2004; Microsoft Windows: EU: 25 June 2004; Fully Loaded; PlayStation 2, Xbox: EU: 24 March 2005; JP: 15 December 2005; NA: 13 December 2006
- Genres: Vehicular combat, racing
- Modes: Single-player, multiplayer

Mashed is a vehicular combat racing video game developed by Supersonic Software. The game was originally released in Europe for PlayStation 2, Xbox and Microsoft Windows in June 2004. An updated version with additional features, titled Mashed: Fully Loaded in Europe and Drive to Survive internationally, was released in Europe in March 2005 and in North America in December 2006. The direct sequel Wrecked: Revenge Revisited was released in 2012.

While the game allows four-player multiplayer, the PlayStation 2 only natively supported two controllers. Since the game used so few buttons, the PlayStation 2 version uniquely allows two people to share a controller – one player would use the D-pad and the left stick, the other would use the colored buttons and the right stick. The game supports the PS2 multi tap for four players.

== Reception ==
Reception

Aggregate score
Aggregator	Score		
Aggregator	PC	PS2	Xbox
Metacritic	60/100	(FL) 80/100; 63/100	72/100 (FL) 68/100

Review scores
Publication	Score		
Publication	PC	PS2	Xbox
Edge	8/10	8/10	8/10
Eurogamer	N/A	N/A	7/10
Famitsu	N/A	21/40	N/A
Game Informer	N/A	7/10	7/10
GameSpot	N/A	2.3/10	N/A
IGN	4/10	N/A	N/A
PlayStation Official Magazine – UK	N/A	9/10	N/A
Official Xbox Magazine (US)	N/A	N/A	4.8/10
PC Gamer (UK)	78%	N/A	N/A
PlayStation: The Official Magazine	N/A	6.5/10	N/A
The Sydney Morning Herald	N/A	3.5/5	3.5/5
The Times	4/5	4/5	4/5

Mashed received "mixed or average reviews" on all platforms except the PlayStation 2 version of the Fully Loaded edition, which received "generally favorable reviews", according to the review aggregation website Metacritic. Andy Young of VideoGamer.com called the Xbox version "a great multiplayer game. One of the best in recent memory". Some American publications gave the game a review over a month after the Fully Loaded edition was released in Europe, but nearly two years before it was released in North America. In Japan, where the PS2 version of the Fully Loaded edition was ported under the name Simple 2000 Series Ultimate Vol. 28: Bōsō! Kenka Grand Prix, Drive to Survive (SIMPLE 2000 シリーズ アルティメット Vol.28 闘走！喧嘩グランプリ 〜Drive to Survive〜, Sinpuru 2000 Shirīzu Arutimatto Vol. 28: Bōsō! Kenka Gurando Puri 〜Doraibu tū Sabaibu〜) and published by D3 Publisher on 15 December 2005, Famitsu gave it a score of two sixes, one five, and one four for a total of 21 out of 40.
