= Micro Machines V4 =

2006 video game

- Developer: Supersonic Software
- Publisher: Codemasters
- Composer: Dan Selby
- Series: Micro Machines
- Engine: RenderWare
- Platforms: Microsoft Windows, PlayStation 2, PlayStation Portable, Nintendo DS
- Release: Microsoft Windows, PlayStation 2 & PlayStation Portable: NA: 27 June 2006; EU: 30 June 2006; AU: 7 July 2006; Nintendo DS: EU: 1 December 2006; NA: 6 February 2007; AU: 9 February 2007
- Genre: Racing
- Modes: Single-player, multiplayer

Micro Machines V4 is a racing video game developed by Supersonic Software and published by Codemasters for Microsoft Windows, PlayStation 2, PlayStation Portable and Nintendo DS.

== Gameplay ==
The player controls a toy Micro Machines vehicle and drives it through a course. As in most games, the objective is to beat the other racers to the finish line. However, as in other games in the Micro Machines video game series, there is an alternate way to victory as well; in racing, the "screen" is shared amongst all racers (opposed to split screen), and if a player can drive far enough ahead of the other racer(s) so that they fall off out of the viewing area, they receive a point. If enough points are received or lost, the player will win or lose. Upon winning races, new vehicles to race as are earned, with a total of 750 to be collected. As the game entails driving toy cars, the race course settings typically reflect that, with courses being set up on pool tables, around the edge of bathtubs, on furniture, or other household type settings.

Along the track, players may pick up orbs containing different power-ups that can be used to heal yourself, or attack other players. These orbs could contain items including; Hammers, Health Pills, Tesla Chess Pieces, Plasma Cannons, Machine Guns, Peashooters and Mines among others. Weapons vary in damage but all roughly dealing one section of health each attack (apart from the pill which heals the player a full five bars of health). Once a player falls below five bars, they will lose a wheel, causing them to drive slower and have less grip. This keeps on occurring until 20 bars are lost. From that point, no more damage can be inflicted onto the racer. A pill is not able to gain wheels back after they are lost. Once a round is over, all players will be set to max health and all lost wheels will be returned.

Apart from power-up orbs, a variety of other pick-ups can be found along the track. These include speed boost tiles, health tiles and equaliser tiles. Speed boost tiles speed the player up for roughly a second before going back to their original speed. Health tiles will often be present in rows of four or five. Each health tile the player runs over will regain them one bar of health. The equaliser tile changes all racers health to that of the racer who activated it. However, even though the health is the same, players will not lose any wheels right away. Once a tile is activated, that tile may not be activated until the following round.

== Reception ==
Reception

Aggregate score
Aggregator	Score
Metacritic	(DS) 62/100 (PC) 57/100 (PS2) 64/100 (PSP) 61/100

Review scores
Publication	Score
Eurogamer	6/10
GameSpot	5.3/10
GameSpy	3.5/5
GamesRadar+	3.5/5 (DS) 3/5
GameZone	(PC) 6/10 (DS) 5.7/10
IGN	7/10
Pocket Gamer	(PSP) 3/5 (DS) 3/5
VideoGamer.com	5/10

Micro Machines V4 received "mixed or average" reviews, according to review aggregator Metacritic Several review outlets noted that the game was competent, but that its poor graphics and shallow, unremarkable gameplay hindered the experience.

IGN gave the game a 7/10, stating that "Micro Machines V4 is definitely the strongest version to come along since the franchise debuted on the NES almost 20 years ago. A solidly-designed title aimed at young children and inexperienced gamers, V4 is a nice, entry-level piece of software that offers just enough challenge and variety for juveniles without the inevitable frustrations and complications found in most of today's racers". GameSpot gave the game a 5.5/10, while they praised the game to its number of cars to collect, they largely criticized the generic nature of the cars, the trial and error-based gameplay and poor camera view.
