= Glenn McQueen =

Canadian animator (1960–2002)

- Born: Glenn John McQueen; December 24, 1960; Toronto, Ontario, Canada
- Died: October 29, 2002 (aged 41); Berkeley, California, U.S.
- Education: Sheridan College
- Occupation: Animator
- Employer(s): Pacific Data Images (1991–1994); Pixar (1994–2002)
- Spouses: Audrey Fleisher (m. 1987, divorced): Terry McQueen
- Children: 1

Glenn John McQueen (December 24, 1960 – October 29, 2002) was a Canadian supervisor of digital animation and supervising character animator at Pixar and Pacific Data Images until his death in 2002.

== Personal life ==
McQueen graduated from Sheridan College in 1985. He was sent by Sheridan on a scholarship to the New York Institute of Technology Computer Graphics Lab, where he worked as head of the 3D production department, which made film effects, television commercials, and scientific visuals.

In 1994, he moved from Pacific Data Images to Pixar, partly due to his interest in Toy Story and his respect for John Lasseter, where he supervised the animation on Pixar's early successes after the aforementioned Toy Story, including A Bug's Life, Toy Story 2, and Monsters, Inc.

McQueen also served as a member of the Academy of Motion Picture Arts and Sciences in Hollywood. He and his wife, Terry, had a daughter.

== Death ==
In December 2001, McQueen was diagnosed with melanoma, but he stated that he would continue working at Pixar. He died on October 29, 2002, at his home in Berkeley, California, at the age of 41, from complications of the disease. His death occurred during production of Finding Nemo, which was dedicated to him. His former colleagues also paid homage by naming the main character in Cars as Lightning McQueen.

== Legacy ==
McQueen has admirers all over the world for his work and has been hailed as one of the best animators in the field. Pixar co-founder John Lasseter called McQueen "a great animator, a great friend and a fantastic family man" and "the heart and soul of our animation department", and also said that "Glenn is not gone from us. He’s still alive in all of us."

Pixar opened a new studio in 2009 in Vancouver, British Columbia, which would be named the Glenn McQueen Pixar Animation Center to honor McQueen. It was planned to be around 20,000 square feet (1,900 m^{2}) and be located in the downtown area of Vancouver. The studio focused on producing short films and television episodes based on Pixar characters. Job qualifications were released in 2009 and the studio opened in spring 2010, producing many shorts, including Small Fry (2011) and Partysaurus Rex (2012).

In October 2013, the studio was closed down in order to re-focus Pixar's efforts at its main headquarters.

== Filmography ==
=== Director ===
- 1991: The Last Halloween
- 1991: Slide Show

=== Animator ===
- 1992: Sleepwalkers
- 1995: Toy Story

=== Supervising animator ===
- 1998: A Bug's Life
- 1999: Toy Story 2
- 2001: Monsters, Inc.

=== Character animator ===
- 1994: Angels in the Outfield
