= Sampras Tennis 96 =

1995 video game

- Developer: Codemasters
- Publisher: Codemasters
- Series: Pete Sampras
- Platform: Sega Mega Drive
- Release: EU: 28 July 1995
- Genre: Sports
- Modes: Single-player, multiplayer

Sampras Tennis 96 is a 1995 tennis video game for the Sega Mega Drive developed by Codemasters. It is the sequel to Pete Sampras Tennis. Like its predecessor, it was one of the few titles released on the J-Cart format, which provides two additional controller ports for multiplayer games. The game was followed by Pete Sampras Tennis '97, which was released for the PlayStation and personal computers.

== Features ==
It was endorsed by Pete Sampras, one of the best-known tennis players of the late 20th century. It features a first-person behind-the-back view of the court with player's choice of multiple male or female players and pick of several different styles of play, including head-to-head and mixed doubles.

== Description ==
The Europe-only sequel to Pete Sampras Tennis, Sampras Tennis 96 includes new features, such as a reworked graphics engine with parallax scrolling, new shots and aftertouch controls, with an Indoor court joining the previously available grass, clay and hard courts.

Compared to the prior game, the ball reacts differently in each court and it is harder to control the direction of the ball, meaning the powerful forehands that could win a game in minutes of the first game are much harder to perform. Services now must be perfectly weighted in both power, direction and timing, facing the risk of hitting the net or going off bounds, with a speedometer showing how fast the best serves went. All these are controlled using the three buttons of the gamepad and the d-pad, with the A button for lobbing the ball, B to make passing shots and C to dive for a direction. By combining the B and A or C buttons it is possible to add top/back or full spin to the ball, with the Y axis changing the power and the X axis the direction.

The large roster of Pete Sampras Tennis was replaced by only eight players: Pete Sampras himself, Sam Nimitz (German, powerful player best suited for hard courts), Marie Guyennot (French, accurate and fast around the court), Minori Hurosawa (Japanese, fast and agile all around), Dino Turnetti (Italian, with an aggressive style of play), Wanda Tucker (American, all around), Esperanza Delgado (Spanish, powerful serve and volleying abilities) and Richard Potter (English, rookie all-arounder). There are three game modes: Challenge (single match, pairs or doubles on any court), Tournament ("Party mode" for up to eight players) and World Tour (single player mode, where the player squares against seven computer players, with the option to play singles or doubles. There is a Pro mode which extends the match to three sets and increase the difficulty setting by enhancing computer player AI and allowing them to perform spin shots).
