= Spelling Challenges and More! =

2007 video game

- Developer(s): Supersonic Software
- Publisher(s): NA: Crave Entertainment; EU: 505 Games
- Platform(s): Nintendo DS, PlayStation Portable
- Release: NA: 24 September 2007 (DS); NA: 25 September 2007 (PSP)
- Genre(s): Puzzle
- Mode(s): Single-player

Spelling Challenges and More! is a puzzle video game developed by Supersonic Software and published by Crave Entertainment for the Nintendo DS and PlayStation Portable. In this game, the player must complete multiple different spelling challenges by using the unique features on the Nintendo DS or PlayStation Portable. This game was released in Europe on the Nintendo DS under the name 'Spellbound'.
