= Todd Alcott =

American actor

- Born: October 22, 1961 (age 63); Crystal Lake, Illinois, U.S.
- Occupation(s): Actor, director, screenwriter
- Years active: 1991–present
- Spouse: Sara Gaffney (1998–present)
- Website: http://www.toddalcott.com/

Todd Alcott (born October 22, 1961) is an American screenwriter, playwright, actor, and director. He was born in Crystal Lake, Illinois.

== Filmography ==
=== Writer ===
- 1996 : Just Your Luck
- 1998 : Antz
- 1999 : Curtain Call
- 2000 : CyberWorld ("Antz" segment and story)
- 2001 : Valentine (uncredited rewrite)
- 2003 : Grasshopper (short)
- 2007 : Enchanted (uncredited rewrite)

=== Actor ===
- 1991 : Thrill Kill Video Club
- 1993 : Six Degrees of Separation as Concertgoer
- 1994 : The Hudsucker Proxy as Mailroom Screamer

=== Director ===
- 2003 : Grasshopper
- 2008: The Bentfootes
- 2014: The Occupants
