= Opéra Industriel =

- Production company: Pacific Data Images
- Release date: 1986
- Running time: 1 minute
- Countries: United States; Canada
- Languages: French; English

Opéra Industriel is a short film produced by Pacific Data Images in 1986. Parts of the film have been used in compilations such as Beyond the Mind's Eye and State of the Art of Computer Animation. The film portrays a number of humanoid, expressionless robots in a monochrome scene that resembles a factory or a forge.

It was an official selection at the 1987 Annecy Film Festival.
