= Character Technical Director =

Character technical director
Occupation
- Names: Character TD, creature TD, technical animator
- Occupation type: Profession

Description
- Competencies: Anatomy, computer programming, mathematics
- Fields of employment: Film & visual effects, feature animation, game development

A character technical director (TD), also referred to as a creature TD (ILM, Weta) or technical animator (Imageworks), is a type of technical director in film and video games who is specifically concerned with characters, creatures, and mechanical objects.

== Responsibilities ==
The role of a character TD may vary from studio to studio in its scope, but is almost always centered around the discipline of rigging: the process of engineering anatomical or mechanical kinematic systems that move and deform digital models, and the design of higher-level interfaces used by computer graphics animators to control the movements of those models.

The role may additionally encompass disciplines such as modeling and simulation.

== Software ==
The software used by character TDs may vary widely from studio to studio, from off-the shelf tools to proprietary in-house systems. Autodesk Maya is used predominantly throughout the VFX and animation industry, with Softimage also having a large user-base. In the gaming industry, Autodesk Maya and Autodesk 3ds Max have been the dominant presence.

Many studios pair off-the-shelf software with their own in-house software and plug-ins for rigging and simulation. For instance, Industrial Light & Magic does much of their sim setup and simulation in a proprietary package called Zeno, and Weta Digital uses an in-house simulation system they call Tissue.

Notable newcomers to the field of rigging include the independent platform Fabric Engine, being used by Double Negative, MPC and Hybride.

== Character TD responsibilities and software by studio ==
=== Industrial Light & Magic ===
Title	Creature TD
Department	Creature dev
Responsibilities	Body rigging Flesh & muscle sim setup Cloth & hair sim setup Simulation
Software	Autodesk Maya; Zeno (proprietary, sim setup & simulation); BlockParty (proprietary Maya tool for rig building)

=== Sony Pictures Imageworks ===
Title	Technical animator
Department	Rigging
Responsibilities	Body rigging Facial rigging Shot finaling
Software	Autodesk Maya

=== Walt Disney Animation Studios ===
Title	Character TD
Department	
Responsibilities	Body rigging Facial rigging Muscle sim setup Cloth & hair sim setup Simulation
Software	Autodesk Maya

== Notable character TDs ==
Within the VFX, animation, and game development communities, a number of artists have gained name-recognition for their contributions to the field of rigging. A few of those artists include:

Jason Osipa is an EA and LucasArts character TD known for pioneering and disseminating (through his book Stop Staring: Facial Animation Done Right) a type of facial-rigging that did not rely on phonemes and pre-built expressions, but rather the blending of more generic poses using simplified controls often referred to as Osipa-Style controls.

Jason Schleifer is a Weta and DreamWorks creature TD Known for his video series "Animator Friendly Rigging", in which he discusses techniques for building complex rigging control systems that are intuitive and easy to use (thus the term "animator friendly").

Dick Walsh is a DreamWorks character TD who won a Technical Achievement Academy Award in 2003 for his development of the PDI/DreamWorks Facial Animation System. He is also known as Shrek's Dad.
