= Pete Sampras Tennis '97 =

1997 video game

- Developer: Codemasters
- Publisher: Codemasters
- Platforms: Windows, MS-DOS, PlayStation
- Release: 1996 (PS1); 1997 (PC)
- Genre: Sports
- Modes: Single-player, multiplayer

Pete Sampras Tennis '97 is a tennis video game developed and published by Codemasters. It was released for Microsoft Windows and MS-DOS. It was also released for the PlayStation as Sampras Extreme Tennis. It was endorsed by multiple Grand Slam champion Pete Sampras who appears in the game as an unlockable character. It is the third and final game in the Pete Sampras Tennis series, following Pete Sampras Tennis and Sampras Tennis 96.

== Gameplay ==
Players can choose to compete in an exhibition versus match against the CPU or another human player, or participate in a tournament or knockout mode. In tournament mode, the player selects from one of four unseeded rookies to compete in a world tour. Knockout mode is an eight-player round robin tournament.

== Reception ==
Reception

Review scores
Publication	Score
Computer Gaming World	3/5 (PC)
Computer and Video Games	3/5 (PS1)
PC Games	72% (PC)

The game received positive reviews upon release, such as Ed Lomas for Computer and Video Games who called it the best tennis game for PlayStation.
