= Antz Racing =

2001 video game

- Developer: RFX Interactive
- Publishers: Light & Shadow Production: UK: Electronic Arts; NA: Acclaim Entertainment
- Platform: Game Boy Color
- Release: FRA: March 30, 2001; UK: April 6, 2001; NA: June 1, 2001
- Genre: Racing
- Modes: Single-player, multiplayer

Antz Racing is a 2001 video game for the Game Boy Color, developed by RFX Interactive and published by Light and Shadow Production with Acclaim Entertainment co-publishing in North America and Electronic Arts co-publishing in Europe. The game is a kart racing game based on the 1998 film Antz.

== Gameplay ==
A screenshot of Antz Racing.

Antz Racing features kart racing between six characters from the film across two modes of play. In '4 Seasons', players compete in a tournament spanning across eight courses from locations in the film, including Anthill, Forest Park, Frozen Pond and the City. 'Quick Race' allows players to play individual circuits. As players race around the tracks, they collect bonuses and weapons, including speed, invincibility, and missiles. Vehicles contain a damage meter that can lead to vehicles being lost if filled when running over obstacles or attacked by other racers. The game also features Game Link Cable support, allowing players to compete in races.

== Development ==
Light & Shadow Production signed a publishing deal with Electronic Arts in September 2000 for the publication of their Game Boy Color titles. However, in January 2001, Electronic Arts announced they had dropped out of publishing Light & Shadow Production's titles in the United States, including Antz Racing. After several months in limbo, Acclaim Entertainment announced they would publish Antz Racing under their Club Acclaim label at E3 2001.

== Reception ==
Reception

Review scores
| Publication | Score |
|---|---|
| AllGame | 3/5 |
| Game Boy Xtreme | 68% |
| Pocket Games | 7.5 |
| Total Advance | 70% |

Antz Racing received lukewarm reviews. Pocket Games stated the game was a "decent kart racer", praising the "high-color introductions and fluid cartoon graphics." Game Boy Xtreme stated the game had "great graphics", whilst noting "it's difficult to anticipate the corners properly."
