= J-Cart =

Video game cartridge

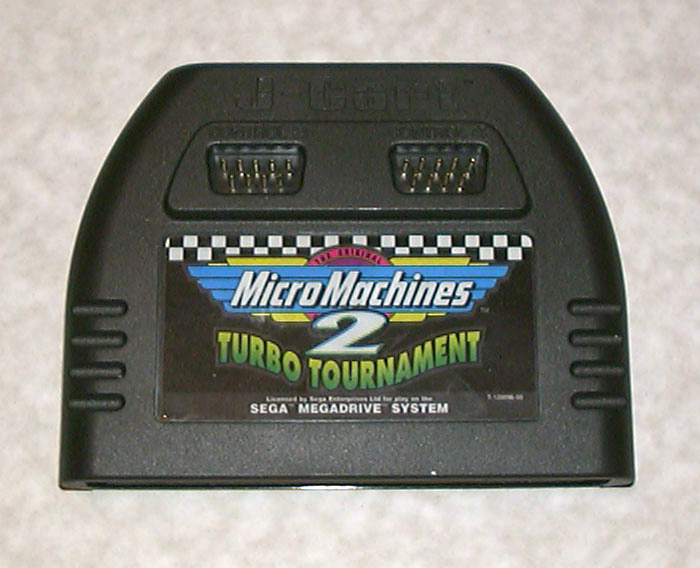
Micro Machines 2 as a J-Cart

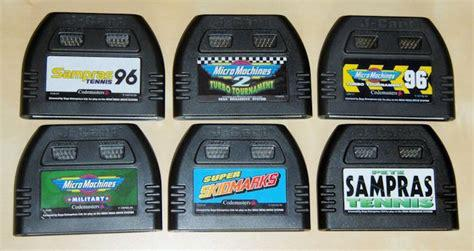
All six J-Cart released games

The J-Cart is a special ROM cartridge developed by Codemasters for the Sega Genesis console. It held not only the game data but also came with two additional gamepad ports. This effectively allowed four players to play simultaneously without any extra adapters. The first J-Cart game, Tennis All-Stars, was released in early 1994.

Micro Machines 2: Turbo Tournament also allowed up to eight players to play simultaneously using up to four gamepads, each player using only the D-pad or face buttons.

The J-Cart came relatively late in the life cycle of the console. In addition, Codemasters never licensed the technology to other publishers. Thus the number of games released as J-Carts was limited.

== Games ==
- Pete Sampras Tennis (Released in US and EU, all other titles EU Only)
- Pete Sampras Tennis '96
- Micro Machines 2: Turbo Tournament
- Micro Machines 96
- Micro Machines Military
- Super Skidmarks
