= Antz =

1998 DreamWorks Animation film

- Theatrical release poster
- Directed by: Eric Darnell; Tim Johnson
- Screenplay by: Todd Alcott; Chris Weitz; Paul Weitz
- Produced by: Brad Lewis; Aron Warner; Patty Wooton
- Starring: Woody Allen; Dan Aykroyd; Anne Bancroft; Jane Curtin; Danny Glover; Gene Hackman; Jennifer Lopez; John Mahoney; Paul Mazursky; Grant Shaud; Sylvester Stallone; Sharon Stone; Christopher Walken
- Edited by: Stan Webb
- Music by: Harry Gregson-Williams; John Powell
- Production companies: DreamWorks Pictures; DreamWorks Animation; PDI
- Distributed by: DreamWorks Pictures (through DreamWorks Distribution) (Note: In July 2014, the film's distribution rights were purchased by DreamWorks Animation from Paramount Pictures (owners of the pre-2005 DreamWorks Pictures catalog) and transferred to 20th Century Fox before reverting to Universal Pictures in 2018 following NBCUniversal's acquisition of DreamWorks Animation in 2016.)
- Release dates: September 19, 1998 (TIFF); October 2, 1998 (United States)
- Running time: 83 minutes
- Country: United States
- Language: English
- Budget: $42–105 million
- Box office: $171.8 million

Antz is a 1998 American animated comedy film directed by Eric Darnell and Tim Johnson, and written by Todd Alcott, Chris Weitz and Paul Weitz, with additional sequences directed by Lawrence Guterman. Produced by DreamWorks Animation and PDI, the film stars the voices of Woody Allen, Sharon Stone, Jennifer Lopez, Sylvester Stallone, Christopher Walken, Dan Aykroyd, Anne Bancroft, Danny Glover and Gene Hackman. Some of the main characters share facial similarities with the actors who voice them. The film involves an anxious worker ant, Z, who falls in love with Princess Bala. When the arrogant General Mandible attempts to seize control of the ant colony, Z must combine his desire for purpose with his inner strength to save everyone.

Development began in 1988 when Walt Disney Feature Animation pitched a film called Army Ants, about a pacifist worker ant teaching lessons of independent thinking to his militaristic colony. Meanwhile, Jeffrey Katzenberg had left the company in a feud with CEO Michael Eisner over the vacant president position after the death of Frank Wells. Katzenberg would later go on to help co-found DreamWorks with Steven Spielberg and David Geffen, and the three planned to rival Disney with the company's new animation division. Production began in May 1996. DreamWorks had contracted Pacific Data Images (PDI) to begin working on computer-animated films to rival Pixar's features. During its production, a controversial public feud erupted between Katzenberg of DreamWorks and Steve Jobs and John Lasseter of Pixar, due to the production of their similar film A Bug's Life, which was released a month later. The feud worsened when Disney refused to avoid competition with DreamWorks' intended first animated release, The Prince of Egypt. Harry Gregson-Williams and John Powell composed the music for the film.

Antz premiered at the Toronto International Film Festival on September 19, 1998, and was released theatrically in the United States on October 2, 1998 by DreamWorks Pictures. It grossed $171.8 million on a budget of $42–105 million and received positive reviews from critics, who praised the voice cast, animation, humor, and its appeal towards adults. Nevertheless, it has been considered to be commercially overshadowed by A Bug's Life.

== Plot ==
In a Central Park anthill, neurotic worker ant Z suffers an existential crisis when everyone in the colony reminds him of his insignificance. At the same time, the colony's princess Bala wants to escape her suffocating royal life. The two meet one night in a worker bar which Bala visits, where Z hears about the legendary insect paradise "Insectopia" from a retired scout. Z and Bala share a dance, after which he becomes smitten with her. Meanwhile, General Mandible - the leader of the colony's army and to whom Bala is betrothed - declares war on an encroaching termite colony. Unbeknownst to anyone else, Mandible is sending only soldier ants loyal to the colony's Queen on a suicide mission to engage the termites in order to stage a coup d'état.

Wanting to see Bala again, Z convinces his best friend Weaver, a soldier ant, to exchange places with him for the army's royal inspection. The next day, Weaver joins the digging crew and strikes up a relationship with Z's co-worker, Azteca, while Z joins the army corps and befriends staff sergeant Barbatus. Z is sent out with a platoon into battle against the termites, who slaughter all the ants except Z. After the carnage, Z finds a dying Barbatus, who tells him to think for himself instead of blindly following orders. Z returns home, where he is hailed as a war hero and is granted an audience with the Queen, where Bala recognizes him as a worker and Mandible orders him arrested. Z panics and pretends to take Bala hostage, escaping the anthill with her.

Outside the anthill, Z decides to leave in search of Insectopia, with Bala reluctantly joining him. Meanwhile, Z's act of individuality inspires the workers and some soldier ants, halting construction of Mandible's "Mega Tunnel" project. Mandible regains their loyalty by portraying Z as a self-centered war criminal, promoting the glory of conformity and promising the workers rewards for completing the Mega Tunnel. However, Mandible's second-in-command, a flying ant named Cutter, begins to doubt Mandible's constant reassurances that he is acting for the good of the colony.

Elsewhere, Z and Bala mistake a human picnic for Insectopia and are told otherwise by upper-class wasps, Muffy and Chip. They are then attacked by a human, who kills Muffy with a fly swatter. Z and Bala get stuck to gum beneath the human's shoe, which the human removes using a coin and drops them in Insectopia (a trash can overfilled with decaying food). Mandible interrogates Weaver, and learns that Z is searching for Insectopia; he sends Cutter out to find it, who later arrives there and forcibly flies Bala back to the colony. Seeing Z's desperation at Bala's abduction, a drunken Chip, mourning Muffy's death, flies Z back to the colony. Z rescues Bala and together they discover that the Mega Tunnel will flood upon completion and that Mandible intends to drown the Queen, along with the workers, and restart the colony with Bala as his queen.

Bala goes to save the Queen while Z attempts to stop work on the tunnel, but it begins to flood. Z and Bala unify the queen and workers into building a ladder towards the surface as the water rises. Meanwhile, Mandible gathers the soldiers on the surface and gloats about creating a new, stronger colony. When the worker ants break through the surface, Cutter betrays Mandible and helps them. An enraged Mandible tries to attack Cutter, but Z intervenes, and he and Mandible fall into the flooded tunnel. Mandible dies striking a root and Z nearly drowns, but is rescued by Cutter and resuscitated by Bala. Z is praised for his heroism, and he and Bala become a couple and, with the colony no longer subject to its previous rules, is finally content with his place in the world.

== Voice cast ==
- Woody Allen as Z-4195 "Z", an idealistic, but anxious worker ant.
- Gene Hackman as General Mandible, the sarcastic, unscrupulous and arrogant general officer of the ant military and Bala's fiancé.
- Sharon Stone as Princess Bala, the future Queen of the colony, Mandible's fiancée, and Z's love interest.
- Sylvester Stallone as Corporal Weaver, a brave soldier ant and Z's best friend who becomes Azteca's boyfriend.
- Christopher Walken as Colonel Cutter, a flying ant who serves as Mandible's patient and empathetic adviser who becomes disillusioned by the general's actions.
- Anne Bancroft as the Queen Ant, Bala's mother and the ruler of the ants.
- Jennifer Lopez as Azteca, another friend of Z's and a worker ant who becomes Weaver's girlfriend.
- Danny Glover as Staff Sergeant Barbatus, a soldier ant who befriends Z during the fight against the termites.
- Dan Aykroyd as Chip, a British-accented wasp whom Z befriends.
- Jane Curtin as Muffin "Muffy", a wasp who is Chip's wife.
- Grant Shaud as the Foreman, the head of the worker ants.
- Jerry Sroka as the Bartender, the unnamed bartender of the bar that Z and Weaver frequent.
- John Mahoney as Grebs, a drunk ant scout with PTSD who talked about Insectopia.
- Paul Mazursky as Z's Psychiatrist.
- Jim Cummings as:
  - Soldier Ants
  - Worker Ant
- April Winchell as a ladybug resident of Insectopia

The cast features several actors from films Allen wrote, starred in and directed, including Stone (Stardust Memories), Stallone (Bananas), Hackman (Another Woman), and Walken (Annie Hall). Aykroyd later co-starred in Allen's The Curse of the Jade Scorpion.

== Production ==
=== Development and writing ===
In 1988, Walt Disney Feature Animation pitched a film called Army Ants, about a pacifist worker ant teaching lessons of independent thinking to his militaristic colony. Years later, Jeffrey Katzenberg, then chairman of Disney's film division, had left the company in a feud with CEO Michael Eisner over the vacant president position after the death of Frank Wells. Katzenberg would later go on to help co-found DreamWorks with Steven Spielberg and David Geffen, and the three planned to rival Disney with the company's new animation division. At the newly founded studio, Katzenberg began developing projects he tried to pursue or suggested while at Disney, including The Prince of Egypt, a collaboration with Aardman Animations which resulted in Chicken Run, Sinbad, and Army Ants. Also many ideas for the film were borrowed from a scrapped PDI film pitch for a computer-animated film from 1991 called Bugs: Lights Out about microscopic robots that take apart machinery.

Production began in May 1996, after production had already commenced on The Prince of Egypt. DreamWorks had contracted Pacific Data Images (PDI) in Palo Alto, California to begin working on computer-animated films to rival Pixar's features. Woody Allen was cast in the lead role of Z. According to Allen, his decision to be in the film was made as a favor to Jeffrey Katzenberg. Allen made some uncredited rewrites to the script, to make the dialogue better fit his style of comedic timing. An altered line from one of his early directed films, Everything You Always Wanted to Know About Sex* (*But Were Afraid to Ask) was included – "I was going to include you in my most erotic fantasies..." Sarah Jessica Parker was originally cast as Princess Bala and even recorded some lines, until she was fired and replaced by Sharon Stone.

=== Feud between DreamWorks Animation and Pixar ===
During the production of Pixar's A Bug's Life, a public feud erupted between Katzenberg, and Pixar's Steve Jobs and John Lasseter. After DreamWorks' acquisition of PDI—long Pixar's contemporary in computer animation—Lasseter and others at Pixar were dismayed to learn from the trade papers that PDI's first project at DreamWorks would be another ant film, to be called Antz. By this time, Pixar's project was well known within the animation community. Both Antz and A Bug's Life center on a young male ant, a drone with oddball tendencies that struggles to win a princess's hand by saving their society. Whereas A Bug's Life relied chiefly on visual gags, Antz was more verbal and revolved more around satire. The script of Antz was also heavy with adult references, whereas Pixar's film was more accessible to children.

Lasseter and Jobs believed that the idea was stolen by Katzenberg. Katzenberg had stayed in touch with Lasseter after the acrimonious Disney split, often calling to check up. In October 1995, when Lasseter was overseeing postproduction work on Toy Story at the Universal Studios Lot's Technicolor facility in Universal City, where DreamWorks was also located, he called Katzenberg and dropped by with Andrew Stanton. When Katzenberg asked what they were doing next, Lasseter described what would become A Bug's Life in detail. Lasseter respected Katzenberg's judgment and felt comfortable using him as a sounding board for creative ideas. Lasseter had high hopes for Toy Story, and he was telling friends throughout the tight-knit computer-animation business to get cracking on their own films. He told various friends, "If this hits, it's going to be like space movies after Star Wars" for computer animation companies. Lasseter later recalled, "I should have been wary. Jeffrey kept asking questions about when it would be released."

When the trades indicated production on Antz, Lasseter, feeling betrayed, called Katzenberg and asked him if it was true, who in turn asked him where he had heard the rumor. Lasseter asked again, and Katzenberg admitted it was true. Lasseter raised his voice and would not believe Katzenberg's story that a development director had pitched him the idea long ago. Katzenberg claimed Antz came from a 1991 story pitch by Tim Johnson that was related to Katzenberg in October 1994. Another source gives Nina Jacobson, one of Katzenberg's executives, as the person responsible for the Antz pitch. Lasseter, who normally did not use profane language, cursed at Katzenberg and hung up the phone. Lasseter recalled that Katzenberg began explaining that Disney was "out to get him" and Lasseter felt that he was cannon fodder in Katzenberg's fight with Disney. For his part, Katzenberg believed he was the victim of a conspiracy: Eisner had decided not to pay him his contract-required bonus, convincing Disney's board not to give him anything. Katzenberg was further angered by the fact that Eisner scheduled Bugs to open the same week as The Prince of Egypt, which was then intended to be DreamWorks' first animated release. Lasseter relayed the news to Pixar employees but kept morale high. Privately, Lasseter told other Pixar executives that he and Stanton felt let down by Katzenberg.

=== Competition with Disney ===
At the time, the current Disney studio executives were starting a bitter competitive rivalry with Jeffrey Katzenberg and his new DreamWorks films. In 1995, Katzenberg announced The Prince of Egypt to debut in November 1998 as DreamWorks' first animated release. A year later, Disney scheduled Bugs to open on the same weekend, which infuriated Katzenberg. Katzenberg invited Disney executives to DreamWorks to negotiate a release date change for Bugs, but the company refused to budge. DreamWorks pushed Prince of Egypt to the Christmas season and the studio had decided not to begin full marketing for Antz until after Prince of Egypt was released. Disney afterward announced release dates for films that were going to compete with The Prince of Egypt, and both studios had to compete with Paramount Pictures, which was releasing The Rugrats Movie in November, based on Nickelodeon's animated series Rugrats. Katzenberg suddenly moved the opening of Antz from March 1999 to October 1998, in order to successfully beat A Bug's Life into cinemas.

David Price writes in his 2008 book The Pixar Touch that a rumor, "never confirmed", was that Katzenberg had given PDI "rich financial incentives to induce them to whatever it would take to have Antz ready first, despite Pixar's head start". Jobs furiously called Katzenberg to explain that there was nothing he could do to convince Disney to change the date. Katzenberg said to him that Jobs himself had taught him how to conduct similar business long ago, explaining that Jobs had come to Pixar's rescue from near bankruptcy by making the deal for Toy Story with Disney. He told Jobs that he had enough power with Disney to convince them to change specific plans on their films. Lasseter also claimed Katzenberg had phoned him with a final proposition to delay Antz if Disney and Pixar changed the date of A Bug's Life, but Katzenberg denied this. Jobs believed it was "a blatant extortion attempt".

=== Release fallout and comparisons ===
As the release dates for both films approached, Disney executives concluded that Pixar should keep quiet on Antz and the feud concerning DreamWorks. Regardless, Lasseter publicly dismissed Antz as a "schlock version" of A Bug's Life; however, Lasseter later admitted that he never saw the film. Lasseter claimed that if DreamWorks and PDI had made the film about anything other than insects, he would have closed Pixar for the day so the entire company could go see it. Jobs and Katzenberg would not back down and the rivaling ant films provoked a press frenzy. "The bad guys rarely win," Jobs told the Los Angeles Times. In response, DreamWorks' head of marketing Terry Press suggested, "Steve Jobs should take a pill." Tensions would remain high between Jobs and Katzenberg for many years after the release of both films. According to Jobs, years later, Katzenberg approached him after the opening of Shrek, and insisted that he had never heard the pitch for A Bug's Life, reasoning that his settlement with Disney would have given him a share of the profits if that were so. In the end, Pixar and PDI employees kept up the old friendships that had arisen from working in computer animation for years before feature films.

The final product of both films are generally perceived to contrast one another in tone and certain plot points. Antz in the end seemed to be more geared towards older audiences, featuring moderate violence, mild sexual innuendoes, and profanity, as well as social and political satire. A Bug's Life was more family-friendly and lighthearted in tone and story. The two films especially differ in their artistic look: Antz played off more realistic aspects of ants and how they relate to other bugs, like termites and wasps, while A Bug's Life offered a more fanciful look at insects to better suit its story. PopMatters journalist J.C. Maçek III compared the two films and wrote, "The feud deepened with both teams making accusations and excuses and a release date war ensued. While Antz beat A Bug's Life to the big screen by two months, the latter film significantly out grossed its predecessor. Rip off or not, Antz's critical response has proven to be almost exactly as positive as what A Bug's Life has enjoyed."

== Music ==
Jeffrey Katzenberg initially wanted Hans Zimmer to compose music for Antz, but because of his commitments with The Prince of Egypt, he suggested his protégés, Harry Gregson-Williams and John Powell, who were working for Zimmer's Media Ventures, to score the film. The soundtrack was released on November 3, 1998, by Angel Records.

== Release ==
=== Theatrical ===
On December 23, 1997, a teaser trailer for Antz, depicting the opening scene with Z in an ant psychiatrist office, first played in theaters in front of select prints of As Good as It Gets. Anticipation was generally high with adults rather than families and children. Antz premiered at the 1998 Toronto International Film Festival on September 19, 1998, and entered wide release on October 2, 1998.

=== Home media ===
Antz was released on VHS and DIVX on February 9, 1999, and on DVD on March 23, becoming the first feature-length CGI-animated film to be available on DVD. The original release used a 35mm print of the film, rather than an encoded version from the original files. A special edition version was released on February 14, 2003.

In February 2006, Paramount Pictures acquired the rights to all live-action films DreamWorks had released between 1997 and 2005, following Viacom's $1.6 billion acquisition of the company's live-action film assets and television assets. Additionally, Paramount signed a six-year distribution agreement for past and future DreamWorks Animation films, with DreamWorks Animation having spun off into a separate company from the live-action division in 2004. Paramount Home Entertainment controlled the home media rights for the film during this time, but did not create any new releases for it, despite releasing other DreamWorks Animation films on home video.

On December 31, 2012, DreamWorks Animation's distribution agreement with Paramount officially ended, and in July 2014, DreamWorks Animation announced they had reacquired the distribution rights to all of their films from Paramount, transferring these rights to their new distribution partner 20th Century Fox. On April 28, 2016, DreamWorks Animation was purchased by Comcast-owned NBCUniversal for $3.8 billion. The film was released on Blu-ray on October 16, 2018, by Universal Pictures Home Entertainment, for the film's 20th anniversary.

== Reception ==
=== Box office ===
The film topped the box office in its opening weekend ahead of Rush Hour and What Dreams May Come, earning $17,195,160 for a $7,021 average from 2,449 theatres. It surpassed Stargate to have the highest October opening weekend. This record would last for two years until it was beaten by Meet the Parents in 2000. In its second weekend, the film held the top spot again, with a slippage of only 14% to $14.7 million for a $5,230 average and expanding to 2,813 sites. It held well also in its third weekend behind Practical Magic and Bride of Chucky, slipping only 24% to $11.2 million and finishing in third place, for a $3,863 average from 2,903 theatres. The film's widest release was 2,929 theatres, and closed on February 18, 1999. The film altogether picked up $90,757,863 domestically, but failed to outgross the competition with A Bug's Life. The film picked up an additional $81 million in other territories for a worldwide total of $171.8 million.

According to DreamWorks, the film's budget was about $42 million, while the numbers $60 million and $105 million were also reported. According to Los Angeles Times, the first figure was doubted by the film industry, considering that other computer-animated films at the time cost twice that amount, and that the budget did not include start-up costs of PDI.

=== Critical response ===
On review aggregator Rotten Tomatoes, the film has an approval rating of 92% based on 91 reviews and an average rating of 7.60/10. The site's critical consensus reads, "Featuring a stellar voice cast, technically dazzling animation, and loads of good humor, Antz should delight both children and adults." Metacritic gave the film a score of 73 out of 100 based on 26 critics, indicating "generally favorable" reviews. Conversely, Audiences polled by CinemaScore gave the film an average grade of "B+" on an A+ to F scale.

Roger Ebert praised the film, writing that it is "sharp and funny". The variety of themes, interesting visuals, and voice acting were each aspects of the film that were praised. Ebert's partner, Gene Siskel, greatly enjoyed the film and preferred it over A Bug's Life. He wrote the film "boasts a smart and funny script that will appeal even more to adults than children." Siskel later ranked it as number 7 on his list of the 10 best films of 1998. Todd McCarthy of Variety praised the voice acting, the script, and the animation in his review. McCarthy summarized: "On its own terms, Antz is fresh and inventive, visually stimulating and extremely well-served by a starry cast largely new to the animation field."

Lisa Schwarzbaum of Entertainment Weekly called Antz a "sophisticated, funny, and joyously subversive animated bug epic that, for all its snazzy computer animation that can claim the 1955 cartoon version of George Orwell's Animal Farm as a first cousin." James Berardinelli of ReelViews wrote Antz "is a very good movie, no matter how you look at it. Visually, it's more impressive than Disney's Toy Story, the pioneer in this burgeoning genre. On a script level, it was developed as much with a mature audience in mind as with the usual pre-pubescent crowd." Michael O'Sullivan of The Washington Post called the script "cleverly written" and was "an old-fashioned yarn about the triumph of individuality over conformity that taps into the universal desire to root for the underdog. As directed by Eric Darnell and Tim Johnson, however, [Antz] actually accomplishes what many live-action narratives fail to do: It makes you care about its speck-sized characters."

Janet Maslin for The New York Times however found the story to be "overplotted in bizarrely grandiose ways", but felt the film worked best by "just showing off its prodigious voice talent ... and playing lightheartedly with the curious possibilities of a buggy world." Kenneth Turan of the Los Angeles Times complimented the visuals, but was unimpressed with the script calling it "too predictable to make an impact even in such a short space." Overall, he opined: "When everything is added up, Antz is more weird than funny, a film that has the potential to make both parents and young children uncomfortable." Rita Kempley of The Washington Post negatively compared Antz to previous Disney animated films as she disliked the adult innuendos, the script, and the use of product placement. She wrote in summary: "For whatever ill-conceived reasons, the material is obviously tilted toward grown-ups. But it's hard to believe that adults will be drawn to a cartoon about an ant no matter how remarkable his accomplishments."

=== Accolades ===
Award	Category	Recipient(s)	Result
AFI's 10 Top 10	Animated	Antz	Nominated
1999 ASCAP Film and Television Music Awards	Top Box Office Films	Harry Gregson-Williams, John Powell	Won
27th Annie Awards	Outstanding Achievement for Directing in an Animated Feature Production	Eric Darnell, Tim Johnson	Nominated
27th Annie Awards	Outstanding Individual Achievement for Music in an Animated Feature Production	Harry Gregson-Williams, John Powell	Nominated
27th Annie Awards	Outstanding Achievement for Production Design in an Animated Feature Production	John Bell	Nominated
27th Annie Awards	Outstanding Achievement for Writing in an Animated Feature Production	Todd Alcott, Chris Weitz & Paul Weitz	Nominated
52nd British Academy Film Awards	The Best Achievement in Special Visual Effects	Philippe Gluckman, John Bell, Kendal Cronkhite, Ken Bielenberg	Nominated
1999 Golden Reel Awards	Best Sound Editing in Animated Feature Film — Music Editing	Adam Milo Smalley, Brian Richards	Won
1999 Golden Reel Awards	Best Sound Editing in Animated Feature Film — Sound Editing	Antz	Nominated
Golden Satellite Awards 1998	Satellite Award for Best Animated or Mixed Media Feature	Brad Lewis, Aron Warner, Patty Wooton	Nominated

== Video games ==
Title	Release date	Platform	Developer	Publisher
Antz	September 24, 1999	Game Boy Color	Planet Interactive	Infogrames
Antz Racing	March 30, 2001	Game Boy Color	RFX Interactive	Light and Shadow Production / Club Acclaim / Electronic Arts
Antz World Sportz	November 30, 2001	Game Boy Color	M4 Ltd.	Light and Shadow Production
Antz: Panic in the Anthill!	2001	Microsoft Windows	Light and Shadow Production	Light and Shadow Production
Antz Extreme Racing	August 28, 2002; September 5, 2002; September 20, 2002	Microsoft Windows; Xbox; PlayStation 2	Supersonic Software	Empire Interactive
Antz Extreme Racing	November 20, 2002	Game Boy Advance	Magic Pockets	Empire Interactive

== Cancelled sequel ==
A direct-to-video sequel was in development at DreamWorks at the time of the release of Antz. Like the first film, it was planned to be produced by Pacific Data Images, and was also considered for theatrical release. By early 1998, when DreamWorks closed its television animation unit and merged the direct-to-video unit with the feature animation, the sequel was still planned, but eventually the project was never made.

== See also ==
- List of films that depict class struggle
