= Pete Sampras Tennis =

1994 video game

- European Mega Drive cover art
- Developers: Zeppelin Games; Big Red Software (Game Gear)
- Publisher: Codemasters
- Platforms: Mega Drive/Genesis, Game Gear
- Release: Mega Drive/Genesis: NA: 1994; EU: June 16, 1994; Game Gear: EU: August 19, 1994; NA: November 1994
- Genre: Sports
- Modes: Single-player, multiplayer

Pete Sampras Tennis is a sports video game published by Codemasters for the Sega Genesis and Game Gear in 1994. A Master System version was cancelled in development. It was followed by Sampras Tennis 96 for the Genesis and Pete Sampras Tennis '97.

== Gameplay ==
While Pete Sampras Tennis uses all three control pad buttons, the game play remains simple yet realistic, for its time. While serving, the A button sends the ball automatically, and B allows the player to control the ball speed and direction, and is the only way to score aces against the best players. During play, A lobs, B sends a normal shot and C, if pressed alone performs a top spin shot, if in conjunction with left or right on the D-Pad the player dives in that direction. It is also possible to aim the ball by pressing any direction on the D-Pad before there is contact between the racket and the ball.

Expert players are able to win against any computer player without giving a point away, since the AI isn't very well developed (and there are no difficulty options) and it's hard to miss a ball. The most usual tactic is to lure the opponent into the net (by making low shots), and then expect he bounces against a mid-height ball close to the net, or if he manages to return, call in a long lob, leaving the opponent with no chances of returning the ball. With harder-hitting characters, it is possible to make strong and accurate returns after the serve, which the computer-controlled player rarely manages to return.

While managing to make perfect use of the lob and spinning shot aim is essential to play the game, top spins can be more a nuisance than helpful. Since it shares the same button as dives, and a good top spin shot requires additional power control (by either pressing up or down), Sega's 8-direction pads, if broken or dirty, or even simply if the user's finger slipped, top spin shots often ended up turning into a dive, the ball passing uselessly by the helpless player.

== Characters ==
The only real tennis player is Pete Sampras. All players, however, have different ratings for base line, service, speed and volleys, and there is a noticeable difference between left- and right-handed players. Not all players can be used in the World Tour mode, as some of them are actual opponents.

== Events ==
There are only three surfaces to choose from (Grass, Hard and Clay). Although the surfaces are not sufficiently differentiated to impinge on AI or player tactics, the bounce of the ball is lowest on Grass and highest on Clay, with Hard intermediate. There are several places where matches and tournaments in the Huge Tour take place, and they are accurate on the kind of surface that tournament actually uses: London (Wimbledon) is played on grass, Paris (Roland Garros) on clay, New York (Flushing Meadows) on hard court, etc. Each surface has three different sets, with the scoreboard on the left, right or middle. This is probably one indication of the court in use: most games during Huge Tour tournaments are played in the sided scoreboard courts, except the final.

== Game modes ==
The game has three main modes: Challenge match, Tournament and World Tour. By inserting the Zeppelin password, two extra modes are unlocked: Crazy Tennis and Huge Tour.

=== Main modes ===
Challenge matches are simple head-to-head matches, where everything can be customized, from game length (1/3/5 sets), location and the kind of game (singles or doubles). All players can be chosen (including opponents in the World Tour), and if the J-Cart is in use, 4 players can play simultaneously.

Tournament is the "party" mode. From four to eight players can compete head to head in a knockout competition until the best two matchup in the final. Although it is not possible to change the match length (5 sets only), each player can choose a handicap, from none to three sets.

The single-player only game mode, called World Tour, is a one set only, composed by 18 rounds across the globe. Some of the players are not available (Sampras included) since they are opponents during the tournament. Since the game is easy, this mode can be beaten in few days.

=== Extra modes ===
Crazy Tennis is one arcade-ish mode where players get points from simply hitting the ball. There is one overall sense of wackiness in this mode, as some lower balls are blocked by a popup racket on the net, some powerups increase the size of the ball or allow direct control of its path, and there is even a cameo from Dizzy, who walks on the net and works as a piñata. After five hits Dizzy breaks, giving several points to the last player who hit the ball. Players can get points from hitting the ball, breaking Dizzy and winning the point, which aggregates all the points played since the last service (which is done automatically by a machine, instead of a player). The game is timed, and both players must achieve the target score - if one of them reaches the timer without the required score, the game ends and the player with the higher score is declared winner.

The Huge Tour mode is a complete competition, nearly a season simulation. There are both men, women and mixed tournaments, for the highest rewarded a minimum place in the ranking is required. In order to win the Australian Open (the season opener) one must first complete a season first. Up to eight players can compete at the same time, the match length is the official: five sets for men, three for women.

== Reception ==
Reception

Review scores
Publication	Score	
Publication	Game Gear	Sega Genesis
Consoles +	90%	89%
Computer and Video Games	88/100	84/100
GameZone	N/A	72%
Hyper	N/A	88%
Joypad	N/A	89%
M! Games	N/A	70%
Mean Machines Sega	91/100	93/100
Mega Fun	76%	79%
Next Generation	N/A	2/5
Player One	90%	90%
Video Games (DE)	N/A	65%
VideoGames & Computer Entertainment	N/A	7/10
Games World	87/100	94/100
Mega	N/A	88%
MegaTech	N/A	79/100
Sega Magazine	N/A	92/100
Sega Power	86%	88%
Sega Pro	91%	90%

Next Generation gave the Genesis version of the game two stars out of five, commenting that Pete Sampras Tennis is an action-oriented tennis game without much action.

Reception in Europe was generally positive. British magazine Computer and Video Games awarded the Mega Drive version 84%, praising its multiplayer support and range of options. French magazine Joypad gave the game 89%, praising its animation, accessibility and four-player mode, and considering it a strong successor to earlier Mega Drive tennis games.

German magazine MAN!AC was less enthusiastic, awarding the game 70 out of 100. The magazine considered it entertaining in four-player matches, but less appealing for solo players and those seeking a more realistic simulation. Spanish magazine Hobby Consolas awarded it 90 out of 100, praising its accessibility, multiplayer support and the J-Cart's ability to accommodate four players without an additional adapter, while noting that the court perspective could take time to become accustomed to.
