= Antz Extreme Racing =

2002 video game

- Developers: Supersonic Software; Magic Pockets (GBA)
- Publisher: Empire Interactive
- Engine: RenderWare
- Platforms: Microsoft Windows, Xbox, PlayStation 2, Game Boy Advance
- Release: EU: 26 July 2002; NA: 13 September 2002; NA: 20 November 2002 (GBA)
- Genre: Racing
- Modes: Single-player, multiplayer

Antz Extreme Racing is a 2002 racing video game developed by Supersonic Software and published by Empire Interactive. The game is based on the 1998 DreamWorks Animation film Antz. The game was released in 2002 for Microsoft Windows, Xbox, and PlayStation 2. The Game Boy Advance version of Antz Extreme Racing was developed by Magic Pockets and released on 20 November 2002.

== Gameplay ==
Antz Extreme Racing is set in each of the four temperate seasons and has four different types of races: driving, flying on the backs of insects, running, and snowboarding or surfing. The game features both a single-player and multiplayer mode; the split screen multiplayer mode supports up to four players.

== Reception ==
Reception

Aggregate scores
Aggregator	Score			
Aggregator	GBA	PC	PS2	Xbox
GameRankings	80%	24%	42%	44%
Metacritic	N/A	N/A	31/100	35/100

Review scores
Publication	Score			
Publication	GBA	PC	PS2	Xbox
4Players	N/A	80%	63%	60%
Game Informer	N/A	N/A	N/A	5.5/10
GameRevolution	N/A	N/A	D−	N/A
GameSpy	N/A	N/A	2/5	N/A
IGN	N/A	2.4/10	2.4/10	N/A
Jeuxvideo.com	15/20	11/20	10/20	10/20
Official U.S. PlayStation Magazine	N/A	N/A	1.5/5	N/A
Official Xbox Magazine (US)	N/A	N/A	N/A	3.2/10
X-Play	N/A	N/A	1/5	N/A

The PlayStation 2 and Xbox versions received "unfavourable" reviews according to the review aggregation website Metacritic.

IGN's Ivan Sulic and GameSpy's Michael Nam both criticized the game for its lacking personality and repetitive gameplay and for offering nothing new to the racing game genre.
