= Puzzle Challenge: Crosswords and More =

2006 video game

- Developer: Supersonic Software
- Publisher: Crave Entertainment
- Engine: RenderWare
- Platforms: PlayStation 2, PlayStation Portable, Wii
- Release: NA: 9 June 2006 (PS2 & PSP); NA: 28 February 2009 (Wii)
- Genre: Puzzle
- Modes: Single-player, multiplayer

Puzzle Challenge: Crosswords and More is a puzzle video game that has over 1,000 word and logic games. The puzzle games include crosswords, codebreakers, word searches (also mini and micro word searches), criss cross (also mini criss cross) and several others. As the player progresses, they can complete puzzles to unlock backdrops, audio tracks, and trophies.

== Reception ==
IGN's Jeremy Dunham criticised the game's graphics, audio, and controls but stated these issues "don't hurt it as much as it would in other titles" and that "there is some genuine enjoyment to be found".
