= Emergency Mayhem =

2008 video game

- Developer: Supersonic Software
- Publisher: Codemasters
- Platform: Wii
- Release: NA: 15 April 2008; AU: 8 May 2008; EU: 13 June 2008
- Genres: Racing, action
- Modes: Single-player, multiplayer

Emergency Mayhem is a 2008 racing action video game developed by Supersonic Software and published by Codemasters for the Wii.

== Gameplay ==
The game is based around the three main emergency services (fire, police and emergency medical services). The player must drive to the destination as quickly as possible. There's a minigame at the end of each level, which is based around defusing the situation. These minigames use the Wii Remote's motion sensing. These minigames include administering CPR, disarming bombs, and wrangling escaped zoo animals, among others.

== Development ==
Emergency Mayhem was announced for the PlayStation 2 and Xbox at the 2004 Electronic Entertainment Expo, published by Acclaim Entertainment and developed by Acclaim Studios Cheltenham. However, the game was canceled when Acclaim Entertainment closed down Acclaim Studios Cheltenham and eventually filed for bankruptcy in September of the same year.

In May 2007, it was announced that Codemasters had acquired the rights to the title and would release it for the Wii, with Warner Bros. Interactive Entertainment handling North American distribution rights. In December, the game was officially announced by Codemasters for a release within the second quarter of 2008, and it was also confirmed that Supersonic Software would develop the game.

== Reception ==
Reception

Aggregate scores
Aggregator	Score
GameRankings	43.04%
Metacritic	40/100

The game has generally been received negatively. GameSpot gave the game a 2.5/10 and criticized the game for its lack of variety, "wildly uneven difficulty", saying that some minigames have "overly sensitive controls" while "others are completely unresponsive". IGN gave the game a 5.0/10 and thought that the graphics were "generic and dated", and the gameplay was "fun, but shallow and repetitive. And there's nothing besides the gimmicky minis that hasn't already been done by Crazy Taxi". They praised it for having "fitting music" and "60 frames at all time".

=== Awards ===
GameSpot nominated Emergency Mayhem for the dubious award of Flat-Out Worst Game in its 2008 video game awards.

== See also ==
- Emergency Heroes, another Wii game released in the same year involving emergency vehicles
