= Ignition (video game) =

1996 video game

- Developer: Unique Development Studios
- Publisher: Virgin Interactive
- Platforms: MS-DOS, Windows, Linux
- Release: December 12, 1996
- Genre: Racing
- Modes: Single-player, multiplayer

Ignition is a racing game for MS-DOS and Microsoft Windows released in 1996 by Virgin Interactive.It features miniature cars and different vehicles such as school buses, police cars and trucks, many of which are unlocked as the game progresses. It was re-released by Interplay in 2017.

== Development ==
Ignition's soundtrack and sound effects were produced by Christian Björklund.

== Reception ==
Ignition received generally favourable reviews. Many highlighted the game's entertainment value, a very good first impression and detailed graphics. Some mentioned its similarity to Micro Machines 2 also featuring "small cars", and the game's simplicity was both seen positively and negatively (lacking content) in comparison.

== See also ==
- Micro Machines (video game series)
