= Emergency Heroes =

2008 video game

- North American cover art
- Developers: Ubisoft Reflections; Ubisoft Barcelona
- Publisher: Ubisoft
- Platform: Wii
- Release: NA: May 27, 2008; AU: June 12, 2008; EU: June 13, 2008
- Genre: Driving
- Modes: Single-player, multiplayer

Emergency Heroes is a 2008 mission‑based driving game developed by Ubisoft Reflections and Ubisoft Barcelona and published by Ubisoft for the Wii.

== Story ==
The story follows Zach Harper, a former cadet of Emergency Heroes, a futuristic service that combines police, firefighting, and emergency medical roles. Harper leaves the program after his actions allegedly cause a fellow cadet's death. Captain Walters recalls him after the team is overwhelmed by a surge of disasters and crime in the city. Harper navigates San Alto's streets, extinguishing fires, rescuing citizens, clearing wreckage, and pursuing criminals.

== Gameplay ==
The game is a driving title in which vehicles are controlled with the Wii's motion controls. As a first responder, the player completes missions by racing through various locations. Optional side activities are scattered throughout the map.

Each mission uses a specific vehicle and requires different driving skills. For example, Rescue Buggies focus on jump‑based missions, while police missions take the form of car chases. The game features 12 rescue vehicle variants, including Police Pursuit, Police Road Clearance, Firefighter, and Rescuer; the remaining three are criminal vehicles. The game includes a two‑player mode.

== Reception ==
Reception

Aggregate scores
Aggregator	Score
GameRankings	45%
Metacritic	41/100

Review scores
Publication	Score
1Up.com	D+
Eurogamer	5/10
GameSpot	2.5/10
GameZone	4.5/10
Nintendo World Report	4/10
Official Nintendo Magazine	62%
PALGN	4/10

Emergency Heroes received negative reviews, earning a 45% score on GameRankings and a 41/100 rating on Metacritic.

GameSpot rated the game 2.5 out of 10, describing it as "Terrible". They criticized the "sterile city", "repetitive missions", and "inconsequential plot", and wrote that neither the single‑player mode, described as a "slog through dull missions", nor the multiplayer mode was well‑designed.

Eurogamer, which rated the game 5/10, noted that the controls were acceptable and that it might appeal to a "five year-old boy", but criticized the graphics, describing the environment as "like it belongs in a PSone game".

== See also ==
- Emergency Mayhem, another Wii‑exclusive released the same year and also centered on emergency vehicles
