= Micro Machines 2: Turbo Tournament =

1994 video game

- Mega Drive cover art
- Developers: Supersonic Software; Merit Studios (SNES); Codemasters (GG, GB)
- Publishers: Codemasters; Ocean Software (SNES, GB); GameTek (MS-DOS)
- Producer: Pat Stanley
- Programmer: Peter Williamson
- Series: Micro Machines
- Platforms: Mega Drive, MS-DOS, Game Gear, Super NES, Game Boy
- Release: 25 November 1994: Mega Drive; EU: 25 November 1994 MS-DOS; EU: July 1995; NA: 31 May 1996 Game Gear; EU: 1995 SNES; EU: 1996 Game Boy; EU: 1996
- Genre: Racing
- Modes: Single-player, Multiplayer

Micro Machines 2: Turbo Tournament is a 1994 racing video game developed by Supersonic Software and published by Codemasters for the Sega Mega Drive. The sequel to Micro Machines, the game is themed around Galoob's Micro Machines toys, and players race around environments in miniature toy vehicles. Micro Machines 2: Turbo Tournament adds new vehicles and game modes, and the Mega Drive version was released on J-Cart, enabling up to eight players without a multitap.

Development began after the release of the Mega Drive version of the original, and there was a focus on graphics and driving physics. Violet Berlin of Bad Influence! makes a cameo appearance as a new character. Codemasters did not develop the game because the programmer of the first Micro Machines was not available, though they did develop the Game Gear and Game Boy versions. Micro Machines 2: Turbo Tournament was ported to various systems, including the Game Gear and MS-DOS, the latter of which features a track editor. The MS-DOS version is the only version of the game released in North America, where it was published by GameTek. An update, Micro Machines Turbo Tournament '96, was released for the Mega Drive in 1995, which added the track editor, new race tracks, and a new soundtrack.

Reception was positive, with reviewers praising the additional tracks and vehicles providing replay value, but some criticised the graphics of some versions. The Mega Drive update was also well received, but some reviewers criticised it for being too similar to the original. Due to the game's success, a spin-off, Micro Machines Military was produced and released in 1996, and a sequel, Micro Machines V3, in 1997.

== Gameplay ==
A typical race in progress, Mega Drive version

Gameplay is identical to the previous instalment: races are viewed from a top-down perspective, and players race in environments such as bathrooms and pool tables (many tracks contain obstacles such as common household objects) in vehicles including powerboats and helicopters. The game adds sixteen vehicles.

Like the original, there are the challenge and head-to-head game modes. In challenge mode, players play a series of races against three opponents and must finish first or second to progress to the next race. If a good enough lap time on any of the earlier levels is achieved, players automatically win the race. Placing first three times in a row earns players the chance to win an extra life by playing a special round to collect vehicles within a time limit. Head-to-head is a game which involves one opponent achieving enough distance from opponents to be the only racer on the screen. This earns that player a point, represented by coloured lights on the screen: one light turns the colour of that player. If all eight lights are one colour, the player of that colour wins. If after three laps, the colours are mixed, the player with the most lights wins. Players are given three lives in both modes. Players select a character, whose stats only affect computer-controlled players, to play as before racing.

Micro Machines 2: Turbo Tournament adds new modes: Leagues, Time Trials, Single Race, and Tournaments. In League mode, players compete for points in divisions. Seasons consist of four races. Players with the most points at the end of the season are promoted to the next division, and players with the least are relegated. In Time Trial mode players race alone (although some tracks have a Shadow Racer representing the best time) for the best time, or to practice driving. Single Race is where players compete in a series of rounds in which vehicles begin at the centre of the screen, and get further apart as the race progresses. If a vehicle goes off the screen, they are out of the race unless they have travelled the furthest. The game ends when only one player remains. Tournaments are a fixed race series played in the same manner as Single Races. The winner is the first player to win a set number of times. There are two multiplayer-only modes: Knockout and Share Games. Knockout involves a series of races similar to tournament mode, with winners progressing to the next round and losers knocked out. Share Games is similar to Single Race, but cars are coloured according to team, with each team's finishing position depending on which member performs the best. The Mega Drive J-Cart provides two controller ports, enabling up to eight players in multiplayer by two players sharing the controllers. The Game Gear version retains the console sharing (two player sharing one console) function of the original, and two units can be linked.

The MS-DOS version includes a track editor, included in an updated Mega Drive release.

== Development and release ==
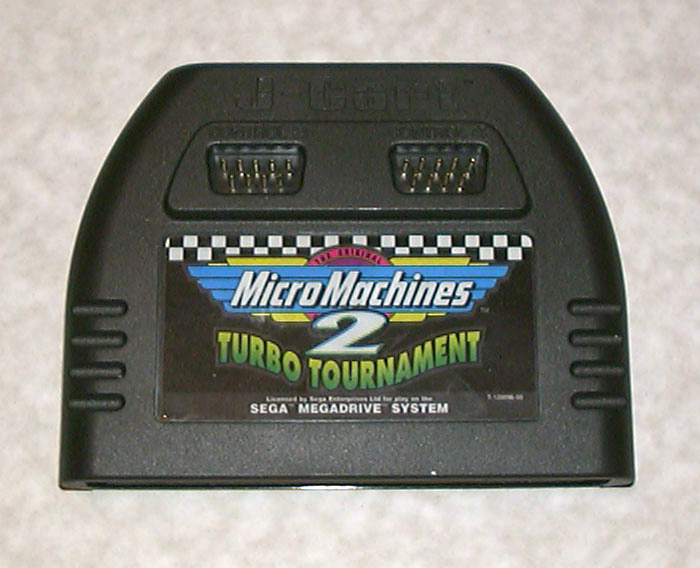
The J-Cart was created to enable four players without an adaptor.

Andrew Graham, programmer of the original game, had returned to university after its completion, and David Darling, co-founder of Codemasters, decided that they could not wait for him to finish his degree. Codemasters approached Peter Williamson of Supersonic Software and had him produce the sequel. Williamson had just completed Cosmic Spacehead and wanted to do something new. It was intended for the sequel to reproduce the feeling of the original and add as many new features as possible. The original was used for reference, and the code and graphics were produced from the beginning. Williamson explained that it was hoped that they could capture and go beyond that the original game offered, and the game's success was anticipated. Darling wanted it to be more than a mere continuation of the first.

Development began in 1993, just after the release of the Mega Drive version of the first game. The release date was set at November 1994, and, according to Williamson, there was pressure to meet it. Early decisions focused on vehicle physics such as heavier vehicles being slow. According to Williamson, slow vehicles were considered "boring" and that the team "made the game for ourselves". He stated that the team wanted more variety and depth than the original, so variables such as tyre friction and wheel lock were programmed to modify the behaviours of the vehicles. These additions increased the size of the game to double that of the original, but compression techniques were used to avoid the need for high capacity storage. This also allowed the production of the J-Cart, enabling four controllers to be plugged in without extra hardware. Williamson believed that increasing the number of players would make the game more fun, and stated that the J-Cart played a major role in establishing it as a "party game". David and Richard Darling came up with the idea of the J-Cart. Although not initially involved with it, Supersonic Software's team were excited on hearing about the J-Cart because they thought it had potential. Richard was also the project manager, and visited Supersonic Software's offices weekly. His primary concern was how much fun the game was. David also thought of the idea of players sharing controllers, increasing the total number of players supported to eight. Williamson said that the team were not concerned with the difficulty increasing too quickly, or having a target audience.

Supersonic's focus was on the graphics and game modes for smaller vehicles. As the Mega Drive was considered the leading platform, an 8-bit look was impossible. David Darling was not happy with early efforts, and had Supersonic redraw the graphics. He said the perspective was wrong and there was slowdown. He also said that getting the game running at 50 frames per second (FPS) in eight-player mode was difficult. Supersonic asked Big Red Software to assist with the graphics. Most of the background graphics were produced by Mark Neesam, using an Amiga 500. He stated that some graphics were hard, despite having access to the originals, and believed that additional colours enabled him to "muddy up" graphics, but also used the increased colour palette to clean some up. Richard Darling encouraged tweaking, giving the game a personality. Journalists frequently visited to check on progress. Violet Berlin, co-presenter of the television programme Bad Influence!, made a cameo appearance as a character: she made one such visit and Richard Eddy of Codemasters asked to take her picture to put in the game. She agreed on the condition that she was made the fastest character, although it was already decided that another character would be. She was instead made the second fastest character.

Micro Machines 2: Turbo Tournament features greater background interaction than the original, such as levels in the dark. Williamson's favourite addition to the game was the sponge in the kitchen, which forced players to time their entry onto and exit from a platform. He also liked the toilet seat track. David Darling initially disliked the physics, stating he liked the way the first game achieved skids without feeling like a train manoeuvring. It was worked on until it was similar to the original, and ultimately it worked "perfectly". According to Williamson, the team spent "enormous amounts of time" testing the game.

Micro Machines 2: Turbo Tournament was released for the Mega Drive on November 25, 1994. The cartridge features a non-volatile memory (NVR) chip that stores lap times and game achievements. The game was ported to MS-DOS, Game Gear, Super Nintendo Entertainment System (SNES), and Game Boy. An Amiga version was also planned. Codemasters handled development for the Game Gear version, which began in September 1994, and the port was released in spring 1995. The MS-DOS version was published in North America by GameTek on 31 May 1996. The European PC release was by Codemasters in July 1995. The SNES and Game Boy versions were published by Ocean Software.

After over quarter of a million copies sold, an update, called Micro Machines Turbo Tournament '96, was released for the Mega Drive in PAL regions on October 20, 1995, which added tracks, a track editor, and a new soundtrack. It was released on J-Cart format, and its NVR chip also stores tracks. The track editor had been featured in the PC version of Micro Machines 2: Turbo Tournament, and Williamson explained that it "seemed like an obvious thing to do", and that it was not possible for the original Mega Drive version because the team were going for a Christmas release date. He also stated that the USA was a difficult market to compete in. The sequel was produced in six months. Due to its success, Supersonic was asked to develop Micro Machines Military, released in 1996 for the Mega Drive, which featured military vehicles with weapons. Graham returned to develop Micro Machines V3, released in 1997. Micro Machines 2: Turbo Tournament was bundled with the original and released for the Game Boy Color in 2000.

== Reception ==
Reception

Review scores
Publication	Score
Computer and Video Games	94% (Mega Drive); 90% (Turbo Tournament 96)
Edge	8/10 (Mega Drive)
GameSpot	8/10 (MS-DOS)
Next Generation	3/5 (MS-DOS)
GamesMaster	97% (Mega Drive)
Mean Machines Sega	95% (Mega Drive); 93% (Game Gear); 92% (Turbo Tournament 96)
Player One	97% (Mega Drive); 92% (Game Gear); 95% (Turbo Tournament 96)
Consoles +	90% (Game Gear); 93% (SNES)
Mega Fun	75% (Game Gear); 83% (Turbo Tournament 96)
Joypad	86% (SNES); 81% (Turbo Tournament 96)
Power Play	79% (MS-DOS)
Coming Soon Magazine	91% (MS-DOS)
Computer Games Strategy Plus	3/5 (MS-DOS)
Sega Saturn Magazine	92% (Turbo Tournament 96)
Sega Magazine	96% (Mega Drive)
PC Zone	92% (MS-DOS)

Micro Machines 2: Turbo Tournament was well received. Critics were impressed with the J-Cart and the extra tracks and vehicles. Mark Patterson of Computer and Video Games praised the Mega Drive version's J-Cart enabling more than two players without extra hardware, and described the game as "bloody brilliant!". Edge's reviewer commented that the extra vehicles, tracks, and game modes increase re-playability of both single-player and multiplayer. The reviewers of GamesMaster lauded its addictiveness and commented that it is amongst the best or highest-rated games they have played. A reviewer from Mean Machines Sega believed the game exceeded their expectations, and echoed other opinions by praising the re-playability provided by the extra levels and vehicles. Player One's reviewer eulogised the animation, saying it lacks slowdown, and playability. Reviewers from Sega Magazine were highly positive: Richard Leadbetter and Tom Guise lauded the multiplayer mode, saying it is "untouchable". The playability were also given high praise, and was described as "superb". Leadbetter believed the game is "totally brilliant and well worth the asking price".

The Game Gear version received positive reviews, with some comparing it to the Mega Drive version. A reviewer from Consoles + describes its music as reminiscent of the Mega Drive soundtrack, and lauded the animation, saying its speed is "incredible". Mean Machines Sega's reviewer described the Game Gear version as "every bit as playable as the Mega Drive classic", but criticised the screen update, saying it "makes things a bit muddy". Player One's reviewer praised the originality of the circuits, but described the sound as average. A reviewer from Mega Fun thought that multiplayer is better with two units linked than with two players sharing one.

Similar compliments were made of the other versions. A reviewer from Consoles + praised the SNES version's simultaneous four-player function and the addition of game modes and tracks. Joypad's reviewer praised the multiplayer, saying it is "simply excellent", and gave the vehicles' manoeuvrability a similar description. Power Play's reviewer praised the MS-DOS version's variety. Vince Broady of GameSpot praised the "excellent" gameplay, but complained that the CD soundtrack is repetitive, and that the graphics were not as good as competitors. Coming Soon Magazine's reviewer complimented its "terrific" gameplay and praised the track editor, saying it was "a tremendous idea" and that it increases playability. Steve Bauman of Computer Games Strategy Plus had mixed feelings: he believed the game is "shallow as hell", but also described it as "surprisingly entertaining". PC Zone's Charlie Brooker liked the graphics and sound, describing them as "cute" and "neat" respectively, and praised the game's "timeless console-style action". The game was named a PC Zone classic. A reviewer for Next Generation remarked that "if you're just interested in simple, arcade-style racing that even runs fine on a 386, well, you've hit the mother lode". He felt the game seemed designed more for consoles, since it is plainly focused on the multiplayer mode but lacks support for networked play, thus requiring the players to crowd around a single PC, but was pleased with the cuteness of the cars and the inventiveness of the tracks.

The updated Mega Drive version was also well received, although some questioned its worth as a separate title. The track editor was described by Gary Lord of Computer and Video Games as "a novel idea", but stated that there is not a lot else to it compared to the original game, describing the extra tracks as "more of the same". A reviewer from Joypad concurred by complimenting the track editor and the extra tracks and saying the game gave "an impression of déjà vu". Mean Machines Sega's reviewer took a different position: he believed that the track editor adds "a whole new dimension", but raised the issue of whether players would want it if they already own the original game. Player One's reviewer gave the opinion that it introduces innovations that add to the game's interest. A reviewer of Mega Fun praised the "exemplary" gameplay, but said track editor was the only renovation. Ed Lomas of Sega Saturn Magazine compared the track editor to the MS-DOS version's, and thought it "severely limited" and not as comprehensive, and also criticised Codemasters for releasing the game as a standalone title rather than an add-on cartridge. Nevertheless, he praised the game in general, saying it is one of the most playable games he has played, but, although he described it as "better", said the improvements over the original are not enough to make it essential. In 1996, GamesMaster ranked the Mega Drive version 6th on their "The GamesMaster Mega Drive Top 10." In the same issue, they also ranked the game 61st on its "Top 100 Games of All Time."

In the United Kingdom, the Mega Drive version ranked fourth on the all-formats console sales chart for Christmas 1994.

== See also ==
- Ignition (video game)
