= Open-book accounting =

Open-book accounting (OBA) is a business practice which opens up an organisation's accounts to some or all of those with an interest in the organisation, including its employees and its shareholders (including those whose shareholding is managed indirectly, for example through a mutual fund) and supply chain. This effectively means all members of the public.

Since almost all accounting records are now kept in electronic form, and since the computers on which they are held are universally connected, it should be possible for accounting records to be world-readable.

== Adoption ==
OBA has become "a well-known practice in supply chain management", although Louise Dunne noted in 2014 that "it is still in its infancy". It is especially relevant to cost-reimbursable forms of contracting, such as target pricing under the New Engineering Contract (NEC3 and 4), Public Sector Partnering Contract and JCT: Constructing Excellence contract, enabling construction clients to understand suppliers' costs and the cost implications of their design and project management decisions. Advocates of open-book accounting argue that full transparency in accounting will lead to greater accountability and will help rebuild the trust in financial capitalism that has been damaged by recent events such as the collapse of Lehman Brothers, the federal bailouts of AIG, Fannie Mae and Freddie Mac, and the fire-sale of Merrill Lynch to Bank of America, in addition to earlier scandals such as the collapse of Enron and Worldcom.

== See also ==
- Open-book management
