= Supersonic Racers =

1996 video game

- Developer: Supersonic Software
- Publisher: Mindscape, Inc.
- Composer: Mark Knight
- Platform: PlayStation
- Release: EU: October 1996; NA: 31 October 1996
- Genre: Racing
- Modes: Single-player, multiplayer

Supersonic Racers (Dare Devil Derby 3D in North America and Japan) is a racing video game developed by Supersonic Software and published by Mindscape, Inc. for the PlayStation.

== Reception ==
The game received an average score of 76.25% at GameRankings, based on an aggregate of 4 reviews. Jeff Kitts wrote in GameSpot, "While ... Dare Devil Derby for the Playstation may not be a photorealistic, pedal-to-the-metal speedfest ... the variety of tracks and racing environments are enough to give it long term replay value." He praised the inventiveness of the tracks. Scary Larry of GamePro was also pleased with the track design but summarized the game as "a fun, addictive game that's plagued with hard-to-grasp controls."
