= Pacific Data Images =

Defunct American computer animation and visual effects production company

PDI/DreamWorks
- Final logo, used from 2000 to 2015

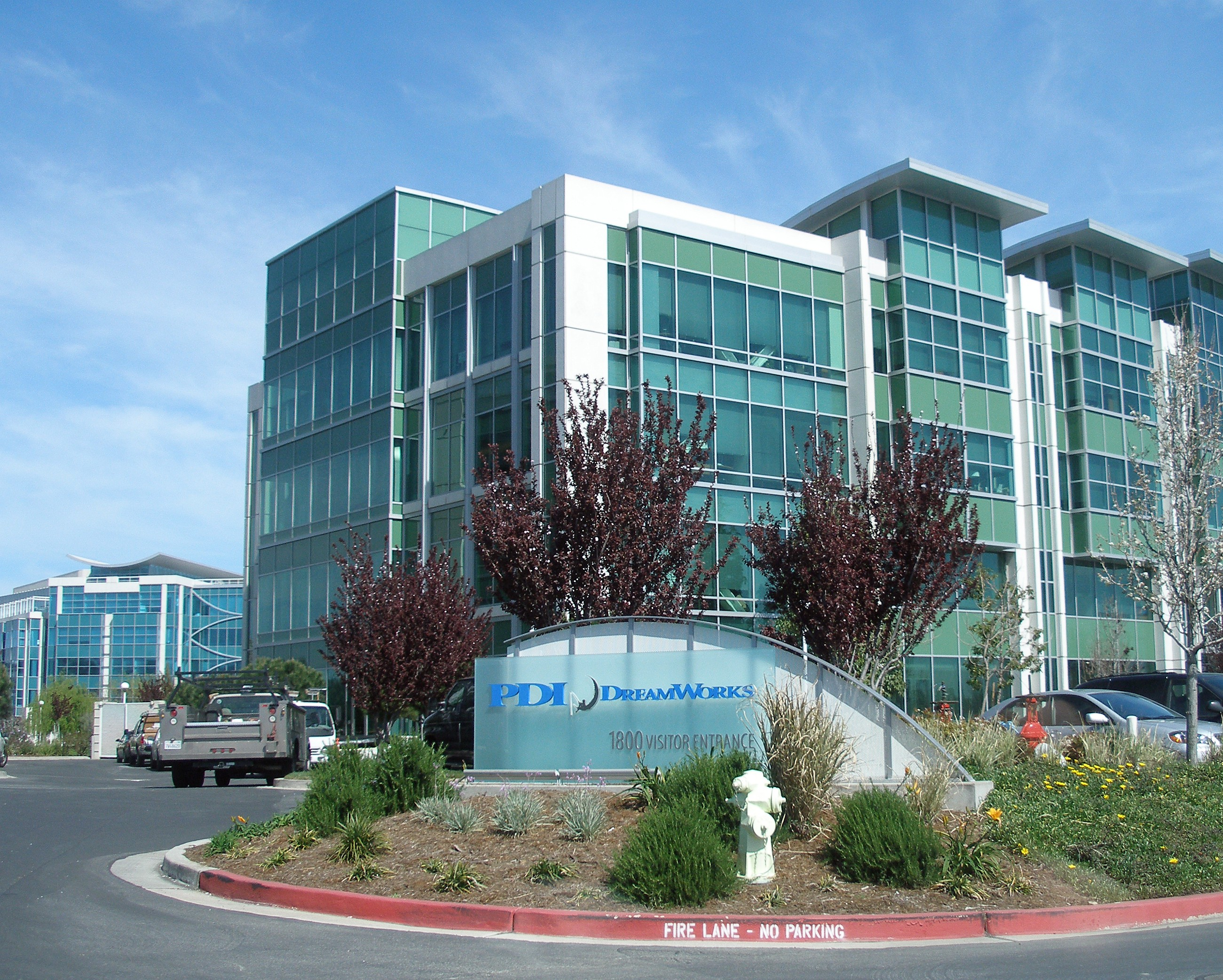
- Former PDI/Dreamworks headquarters at Redwood City's Pacific Shores Center before the company moved in 2012 to larger facilities in another building in the same office complex.
- Formerly: Pacific Data Images (1980–2000)
- Type: Subsidiary
- Industry: Film
- Founded: August 13, 1980; 46 years ago
- Founder: Carl Rosendahl
- Defunct: January 22, 2015; 11 years ago
- Fate: Closed
- Successor: DreamWorks Animation
- Headquarters: Redwood City, California, United States
- Number of employees: 450 (January 2015)
- Parent: DreamWorks Animation (2000–2015)

Pacific Data Images (PDI) was an American computer animation and visual effects production company based in Redwood City, California, that was bought by DreamWorks SKG in 2000. It was renamed PDI/DreamWorks and was owned by DreamWorks Animation.

Founded in 1980 by Carl Rosendahl, PDI was one of the pioneers of computer animation, it produced more than 700 commercials, contributed visual effects to more than 70 feature films, and produced and contributed to many of DreamWorks Animation's films, beginning with DreamWorks's first film, Antz, in 1998. PDI's final animated film before its closure on January 22, 2015, was Penguins of Madagascar, released on November 26, 2014.

== History ==
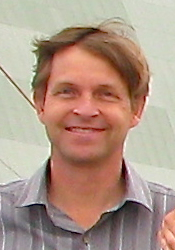
PDI's founder Carl Rosendahl in 2009

=== 1980–1987: early years ===
PDI was founded in 1980 by Carl Rosendahl with a $25,000 loan from his father. He was joined in 1981 by Richard Chuang, and in 1982 by Glenn Entis. Richard and Glenn wrote the foundation of the in-house computer animation software that was to be used for the next two decades. They started work on 3D software at 1981's end, and 3D production started in fall 1982. The initial goal of the company was "Entertainment using 3D computer animation".

The first computer at PDI was a DEC PDP 11/44, with 128 kilobytes of memory. This was a lot of memory, given that the computer had only 64 kibibytes (16-bits) of address space. It had a 20 megabyte disc. Attached was a $65,000 framebuffer that had a resolution of 512×512 and was 32 bits deep.

The first 3D image rendered at PDI was done March 12, 1982. The image was simply a 4 by 4 by 4 grid of spheres of varying colors. The spheres were not polygonal; they were implicitly rendered and were fully anti-aliased. The resulting image was 512 by 480 by 24 (8 bits for red, green and blue channels), which took two minutes to render.

The PDP-11 was soon replaced by a DEC VAX-11/780, and PDI shifted to another superminicomputer called the Ridge 32 from Ridge Computers. This machine was 2-to-4 times faster than the VAX-11/780, at a fraction of the cost.

The original in-house software evolved to a large suite of tools that included a polygon scan-line renderer (called p2r), an interactive animation program (called e-motion), an animation scripting and scene-description language (called script), and a lighting tool (called led). All of these tools were written in C and deployed on a variety of machines running various flavors of Unix.

The initial investment to start the company was $250,000 (equivalent to $977,000 in 2025). Its original offices were in Sunnyvale, California, working from a garage owned by Carl's father. PDI moved to its first real offices in 1985, to its second offices in 1995, and to its last location in Redwood City at the Pacific Shores Center in 2002. The growth of the company was financed solely through profit. The company was run as an open book; monthly financial reviews were shared with the entire company, and a detailed monthly financial report was released. Money was never taken out of the company, which maintained a 7% investment in research and development. PDI was debt-free when acquired by DreamWorks in 2000.

Pacific Data Images's first client was Rede Globo, Brazil's largest TV network, owned by Grupo Globo through its current Globo division. This gave PDI the major client it needed to fund the creation of most of its early software. This also sent PDI into the business of TV motion graphics and logo animation. PDI designed some early show openings and other special projects for Rede Globo. The software written was also given to Rede Globo and is the only time the in-house software was given to another company. The contract ended in the mid-1980s, but Rede Globo continued to use the software until 1989.

Most of the 1980s were spent creating broadcast graphics for many television networks around the world. PDI was working concurrently for ABC, A&E, CBS, NBC, HBO, Cinemax, MTV, PBS, VH1, TNT, WOR-TV, Nine Network Australia, Sky One, Showtime and USA Network. PDI focused on direct-to-video production, as opposed to film output being done at other early studios. PDI modified the interface to a Sony BVH-2000 using parts put together from a trip to a toy store to do single-frame recording. All the rendering was done on fields at 60 or 50 frames per second (depending on the video broadcasting standard used locally).

As one of the first mass producers of computer animation, Pacific Data Images controlled a large percentage of this market during this time. One year producing two major networks' graphics packages meant specifically rendered images for over 400 local television stations. Some of the early production contracts included Globo, Entertainment Tonight (produced for Harry Marks), ABC Sports 84 Olympic promos, and NBC News.

Pacific Data Images worked with Atari, also in Sunnyvale, in the early 1980s on a couple of projects. In 1982, Rosendahl was hired to set up and calibrate Atari's computer animation film recorder system that would be used for video game footage in Superman III.

Pacific Data Images proposed a feature-length CG animation film in 1985, but they were unable to raise the funding needed to produce it.

Pacific Data Images outlived all the other computer graphics studios that existed in the early 1980s. One of the reasons for this is that PDI never went into significant debt by purchasing expensive hardware. While other studios purchased or leased supercomputers, PDI bought cheaper hardware, treating it as a commodity which would soon be replaced, enabling lower operating costs.

=== 1987–1990: transition ===
Pacific Data Images's early focus was on network TV productions, for they captured more than 50% of that market in 1985. However, in 1990, PDI introduced the digital film scanning process. This process was used to popularize automated rig removal and image touch-up. PDI was also instrumental in introducing performance animation for theme parks, ads and movies. This started with a joint project in 1988 with Jim Henson's Creature Shop on a real-time performance character named Waldo C. Graphic for The Jim Henson Hour (1989).

During these years of transition, Pacific Data Images moved away from the motion graphics market, and focused its attention on commercials and 3D visual effects for feature films. Noted for its commercials for the first Pillsbury Doughboy created with computer graphics. Pillsbury was the first company to move an established icon to CGI. Previously, animated commercials with stop-motion include the "Bud Bowl" and "Scrubbing Bubbles" spots.

Early in the 1990s, Thaddeus Beier and Shawn Neely developed a method for morphing that resulted in a more natural and expressive morph. The technique is called "feature-based morphing". Pacific Data Images used this technology to create various well-known sequences, including the Exxon car-into-tiger morph and the extended morph at the end of the "Black or White" music video by Michael Jackson. These morphing jobs were easy to do with PDI's software, and the effect was in high demand. The algorithms invented by Beier and Neely were published at the annual SIGGRAPH conference, and are now the basis of most image morphing tools. For many people, their first exposure to these algorithms was the SGI IRIX software called "Elastic Reality". PDI also did the opening sequence for the 1990s revival of the classic game show, Let's Make a Deal.

Pacific Data Images broke into the feature film visual effects business with contributions to Terminator 2, Toys, Angels in the Outfield, Batman Forever and The Arrival. At the time, the strengths of PDI included character animation, lip synch, rendering effects, the aforementioned rig removal and cleanup, and performance animation.

During this era, Pacific Data Images transitioned from the Ridge32 computer to SGI workstations, running IRIX. They were not alone in this transition, for most of the industry followed suit.

=== 1990–1995: character animation ===
In early 1990, Tim Johnson and Rex Grignon officially formed Pacific Data Images's Character Animation Group, with the mandate to develop a group of artists with the creative and technical skills needed to produce a feature-length computer-generated film. The group originally consisted of Johnson, Grignon, Raman Hui, Glenn McQueen, Beth Hofer, Dick Walsh, Karen Schneider and Eric Darnell. Under this group, PDI's commercial character animation skills grew, and numerous notable short films were produced. Among these are Gas Planet (1992), Sleepy Guy (1994), Brick-a-Brac (1995), Gabola the Great (1997), Fishing (1999) and Fat Cat on a Diet (1999).

This character group set the company in a new direction that set the basis for development goals during this period. The short films were a way to develop animation techniques, as well as being a test for software and pipeline procedures and flow.

Pacific Data Images allowed animators to pursue individual products and shorts. This produced several award-winning short films in this category. Some of the more notable productions are Opéra Industriel (1986), Chromosaurus, Cosmic Zoom (1985), Burning Love (1988) and Locomotion (1989).

By 1992, Pacific Data Images was looking for a partner to produce feature-length animated films. In the meantime, the company (with help from Lucasfilm's Industrial Light & Magic) worked on the 1991 TV special, The Last Halloween, for Hanna-Barbera Productions, which won an Emmy Award for the computer-generated characters in the otherwise live-action special. This became PDI's first 3D Character Animation pipeline. Using this pipeline, they created a 3D stereo Daffy Duck for Warner Bros., and a CG Homer and Bart Simpson for the "Homer^{3}" segment of the 1995 The Simpsons episode, "Treehouse of Horror VI".

The result of these projects was a movie deal with DreamWorks SKG in 1995 to make the movie Antz. At this time, DreamWorks purchased a 40% share of PDI.

Glen Entis left PDI for the game industry in 1995, joining DreamWorks Interactive as CEO. When Electronic Arts purchased DreamWorks Interactive, he moved to their Vancouver office to set up its next-generation games research group. He is a founding board member of Los Angeles's Digital Coast Roundtable, and is chairman of the Academy of Interactive Arts & Sciences.

=== 1995–2015: feature films and closure ===
Pacific Data Images's first feature film, Antz, was released by DreamWorks Pictures October 2, 1998. This was followed by Shrek May 18, 2001.

After the success of Antz, Sega contacted the company to create a series of commercials for a marketing campaign for the launch of the Sega Dreamcast. in 2000, Carl Rosendahl sold his remaining interest in PDI to DreamWorks. PDI was renamed PDI/DreamWorks and continued to operate as a stand-alone business unit. Rosendahl left PDI in February 2000 to become managing director for Mobius Venture Capital (formerly Softbank Venture Capital), focusing on investments in technology and media companies, founding a youth media company, in 2008, joining Carnegie Mellon Entertainment Technology Center, as a Distinguished Professor of Practice.. In May 2001, the sale essentially united the two studios, PDI and DreamWorks, into a single entity that went public a few years later as DreamWorks Animation (DWA). PDI stopped making commercials and visual effects for live-action films in 2002. Animators at PDI worked on projects based at the PDI studio, but they also assisted in DWA projects based in the Glendale DWA studio.

By the time Pacific Data Images reached its 25th anniversary in 2005, it had completed more than 1,000 projects, and grown to more than 400 employees.

In 2008, Richard Chuang, the last of the founding three, left the company to pursue his own ventures.

In July 2012, PDI/DreamWorks moved to a larger office building with about 200,000 square feet (19,000 m^{2}) of interior space in the same office complex at Pacific Shores Center. It was about one-third larger than the previous building and featured "an on-site clinic for a doctor’s office and nutritionist, a larger cafe and more outdoor space with gas heaters" to allow for "hanging outside year-round".

On January 22, 2015, PDI/DreamWorks was shuttered as part of its parent company's restructuring plans following the box-office underperformance of the 2014 films Mr. Peabody & Sherman and Penguins of Madagascar, cutting off 500 jobs.

== Technical awards ==
PDI/DreamWorks has won nine Scientific and Technical Academy Awards. The first was awarded in 1994 to Les Dittert, with others, for work in the area of film scanning. The second was awarded to Carl Rosendahl, Richard Chuang and Glenn Entis in 1997 for the concept and architecture of the PDI animation system. This award, in particular, recognized their pioneering work in computer animation, dating back to the founding of PDI 17 years earlier. Nick Foster was given an award in 1998 for PDI's fluid animation system (flu), and in 2002, Dick Walsh was given one for the development of PDI's Facial Animation System.

In 2010, Eric Tabellion and Arnauld Lamorlette were given an award for PDI's global illumination rendering system first used on Shrek 2. It was the first use of global illumination in an animated feature film, a technique that is commonplace today.

In 2013, Lawrence Kesteloot, Drew Olbrich and Daniel Wexler were given an award for PDI's lighting tool, called "light". The tool was developed in 1996 for PDI's first feature film, Antz, and was used until 2015 at PDI and DreamWorks Animation, 25 films later.

In 2015, Scott Peterson, Jeff Budsberg and Jonathan Gibbs were awarded for the studio's foliage (trees and vegetation) system. The system was first used on Shrek. At the ceremony, Karl Rasche was awarded with engineers from HP for his part in the creation of the "DreamColor" monitor.

Richard Chuang, Rahul Thakkar, Mark Kirk and Stewart Birnam, with DreamWorks engineer Andrew Pilgrim, won a 2016 SciTech technical achievement award for their work on digital movie review systems.

The Academy of Motion Picture Arts and Sciences has announced that Drew Olbrich (CS '92) it was receive an Academy Award for his role in creating the Light system for computer graphics lighting, which has been used for Shrek, Madagascar and other animated DreamWorks features.

== Filmography ==
=== Films ===
#	Title	Release date	Budget	Gross	Rotten Tomatoes	Metacritic	CinemaScore
1	Antz	October 2, 1998	$42–105 million	$171 million	93% (91 reviews)	72 (26 reviews)	B+
2	Shrek	May 18, 2001	$60 million	$484 million	88%	84	A
3	Shrek 2	May 19, 2004	$150 million	$932 million	89%	75	A
4	Madagascar	May 27, 2005	$75 million	$542 million	55%	57	A−
5	Shrek the Third	May 18, 2007	$160 million	$813 million	41%	58	B+
6	Madagascar: Escape 2 Africa	November 7, 2008	$150 million	$604 million	64%	61	A−
7	Megamind	November 5, 2010	$130 million	$322 million	72%	63	A−
8	Madagascar 3: Europe's Most Wanted	June 8, 2012	$145 million	$747 million	79%	60	A
9	Mr. Peabody & Sherman	March 7, 2014	$145 million	$275 million	80%	59	A
10	Penguins of Madagascar	November 26, 2014	$132 million	$373 million	72% (109 reviews)	53 (31 reviews)	A−

=== Film effects ===
PDI contributed visual effects, animation and other services to the following films:

- Electric Dreams (1984)
- Scrooged (1988)
- Ghost (1990) (uncredited)
- Solar Crisis (1990)
- Terminator 2: Judgment Day (1991)
- Freddy's Dead: The Final Nightmare (1991)
- Star Trek VI: The Undiscovered Country (1991)
- The Last Boy Scout (1991) (digital compositing)
- Body Parts (1991) (trailer)
- Freejack (1992) (uncredited)
- Sleepwalkers (1992)
- The Babe (1992)
- Lethal Weapon 3 (1992) (digital compositing)
- Batman Returns (1992)
- Mo' Money (1992)
- Toys (1992)
- Lorenzo's Oil (1992)
- Robocop 3 (1993)
- Cliffhanger (1993)
- Dennis the Menace (1993)
- Rookie of the Year (1993)
- Heart and Souls (1993) (Visual effects and title sequence)
- For Love or Money (1993)
- Freaked (1993)
- Carlito's Way (1993)
- Lightning Jack (1994)
- Beverly Hills Cop 3 (1994)
- Angels in the Outfield (1994) (Visual effects and co-animation with Walt Disney Animation Studios)
- True Lies (1994)
- Airheads (1994)
- Natural Born Killers (1994)
- The River Wild (1994)
- Double Dragon (1994)
- Speechless (1994)
- Batman Forever (1995)
- Bushwhacked (1995)
- Broken Arrow (1996)
- Executive Decision (1996)
- The Arrival (1996)
- Eraser (1996)
- Batman and Robin (1997)
- A Simple Wish (1997)
- The Peacemaker (1997)
- Titanic (1997)
- Mouse Hunt (1997) (Uncredited)
- Paulie (1997) (Uncredited)
- Forces of Nature (1999)
- The Out-Of-Towners (1999)
- Supernova (2000)
- Mission: Impossible 2 (2000)
- The Legend of Bagger Vance (2000)
- The Road to El Dorado (2000)
- The Deep End (2001)
- The Mexican (2001)
- Evolution (2001)
- A.I. Artificial Intelligence (2001)
- Minority Report (2002)
- People I Know (2002)
- Sinbad: Legend of the Seven Seas (2003)

=== Shorts ===
- Teddy Bear Maelstrom (1983, Glen Entis)
- Elephant Bubbles (1984, Don Venhaus)
- Max Trax (1985, Adam Chin)
- Botco (1985, PDI Staff)
- Cosmic Zoom (AKA Comic Zoom) (1985, PDI Staff)
- Chromosaurus (1985, Don Venhaus)
- Max's Place (1985, Adam Chin)
- Happy Drinking Birds (1985, Rich Cohen)
- Opéra Industriel (1986, Adam Chin, Rich Cohen)
- Burning Love (1988, Roger Gould, Howard E. Baker)
- Locomotion (1989, Steve Goldberg)
- The Wave (1989, Scott Miller)
- Slide Show (1991, Glenn McQueen)
- Frankie & Johnny (1991, PDI Staff)
- Happy Dog (1992, PDI Character Animation Group)
- Gas Planet (1992, Eric Darnell)
- Big Smoke (1993, Eric Darnell)
- Sleepy Guy (1994, Raman Hui)
- Brick-a-Brac (1995, Cassidy Curtis)
- Gabola The Great (1997, Tim Cheung)
- Basic Insect (1998, Marty Sixkiller)
- Millennium Bug (1998, Lee Lainer)
- Fat Cat On a Diet (1999, Raman Hui)
- Fishing (1999, David Gainey)
- Metropopular (2000, Jonah Hall)
- Shrek in the Swamp Karaoke Dance Party (2001, PDI Staff)
- Sprout (2002, Scott B. Peterson) – Final independent work.
- Far Far Away Idol (2004, PDI Staff)
- The Madagascar Penguins in a Christmas Caper (2005, Gary Trousdale)
- Megamind: The Button of Doom (2011, Simon J. Smith)
- Madly Madagascar (2013, David Soren)
- Rocky & Bullwinkle (2014, Gary Trousdale)

=== Television specials ===
- The Last Halloween (1991)
- Shrek the Halls (2007)
- Merry Madagascar (2009)
- Scared Shrekless (2010)

=== Other work ===
- PBS logo (Computer Animation) (1989–1993)
- The Jim Henson Hour (Computer Animation) (1989)
- The Last Halloween (Character Animation) (1991)
- Muppet*Vision 3D (1991) (Waldo Character Animation)
- "She's Mad" (1992) (Music video for David Byrne)
- The Simpsons Treehouse of Horror VI (1995) ("Homer^{3}" Segment)
- Marvin the Martian in the Third Dimension (1996) (Theme Park Ride/Short Film)
- Cartoon Sushi (1997) (Gabola The Great Segment)
- Cyberworld 3D (2000) (IMAX film, Antz and The Simpsons segments)
- Courage the Cowardly Dog (Hard Drive Courage CG animated segment)
- 74th Academy Awards (2002) (Animation for the characters of Shrek and Donkey in the audience during the award for Best Animated Feature)
- Shrek 4-D (2003) (Theme Park Ride/Short Film)
- THX trailer (Shrek) (Animation for the characters of Shrek and Donkey; co-produced with DreamWorks Animation) (2006–2007)
- Madagascar: A Crate Adventure (2011) (Theme Park Ride) (animated sequences)
- Home (2015) (production services)

== See also ==
- Pearl Studio
- DreamWorks Animation
- Shrek fandom
- Shrek (franchise)
- Madagascar (franchise)
- Megamimd (franchise)
- Pixar
- Blue Sky Studios
- Sony Pictures Imageworks
- Framestore
- Industrial Light & Magic
- DNA Productions
