= The Last Halloween =

American Halloween television special produced by Hanna-Barbera

- Genre: Live-action; Animation; Adventure; Comedy; Sci-fi
- Written by: Savage Steve Holland; Sean Roche
- Directed by: Savage Steve Holland
- Starring: Will Nipper; Sarah Matinek; Rhea Perlman; Richard Moll; Eugene Roche; Michael D. Roberts; Sarah Martineck; Stan Ivar
- Voices of: Paul Williams; Don Messick; Frank Welker
- Narrated by: William Hanna
- Composer: Bruce Broughton
- Country of origin: United States
- Original language: English

Production
- Executive producer: David Kirschner
- Producers: Kenneth R. Koch; Brad Lewis; Mark Moore; Carl Rosendahl
- Cinematography: John J. Connor
- Editor: Augie Hess
- Running time: 25 minutes
- Production company: Hanna-Barbera Productions

Original release
- Network: CBS
- Release: October 28, 1991

The Last Halloween is an American Halloween television special produced by Hanna-Barbera. It premiered and first aired on CBS on October 28, 1991. The visual effects and animation were provided by Industrial Light & Magic and Pacific Data Images.

== Plot ==
Four aliens - Gleep (voiced by Paul Williams), Romtu (voiced by Don Messick), Scoota (voiced by Frank Welker), and Bing (voiced by Welker) have been sent to Earth from the planet Mars in order to find a rare material known as "coobi" (which is later revealed to be candy). After crash landing on Earth, they wander the streets searching for "coobi," but are mistaken for trick-or-treaters and ignored. When Scoota gets a strong reading on his "coobi meter," the four aliens chase down two children, Michael (Will Nipper) and his younger sister, Jeanie (Sarah Matinek), into the woods. The children learn about the aliens' mission and agree to help them collect candy. Meanwhile, Mrs. Gizbourne (a woman played by Rhea Perlman who had a previous run-in with Jeanie and Michael) and her assistant Hans (Richard Moll) are in an old house performing experiments on insects to find the secrets of eternal youth. It is revealed that by performing these experiments they have nearly drained Crystal Lake, which is the main source of power for a candy factory in town. Mrs. Gizbourne then demands that Hans find a bug "big and strong enough to survive a nuclear meltdown."

The children and the aliens agree to split into two groups to find more candy, one group consisting of Gleep, Romtu, and Scoota and the other group consisting of Jeanie, Michael and Bing. The children become distraught when they learn that Bing is running towards Mrs. Gizbourne's house. Hans mistakes Bing for a giant insect and proceeds to capture Bing and bring him to Mrs. Gizbourne. The children learn of Mrs. Gizbourne's plot, but are soon captured by Hans. Jeanie and Michael are quickly able to escape with Bing in tow to the lake. There they are found by Jeanie and Michael's father, who goes on to thwart Mrs. Gizbourne's plans. The first group of aliens then arrive at the candy factory, take all of the candy, give Michael a special skipping stone and return to Mars. Michael uses this stone and the power of wishing to revive Crystal Lake. The candy factory is thus saved, and the townspeople end the special rejoicing.

== Accolades ==
The special won a Primetime Emmy Award in 1992 for Outstanding Special Visual Effects in a Season or a Movie.
