= Supersonic Software =

British video game developer

Supersonic Software Ltd.
- Company type: Public
- Industry: Video games
- Founded: 1989
- Headquarters: Leamington Spa, England
- Products: Micro Machines series (1994–6, 2006)

Supersonic Software Ltd. is a British video game developer based in Leamington Spa, England. It was founded by former Codemasters employee Peter Williamson. It was acquired by Miniclip in 2021.

== Games developed ==
Year	Game	Platform(s)
1993	Cosmic Spacehead	Amiga, MS-DOS, Game Gear, Master System, Mega Drive
1994	Micro Machines 2: Turbo Tournament	MS-DOS, Sega Mega Drive
1995	Micro Machines Turbo Tournament '96	Sega Mega Drive
1996	Micro Machines Military	Sega Mega Drive
1996	Supersonic Racers	PlayStation
1998	Circuit Breakers	PlayStation
1999	Pong: The Next Level	Windows, PlayStation
2000	Breakout	Windows, PlayStation
2002	Antz Extreme Racing	Windows, PlayStation 2, Xbox
2003	Starsky & Hutch	GameCube, Xbox
2004	Mashed	Windows, PlayStation 2, Xbox
2005	Circuit Blasters	PlayStation 2
2006	Puzzle Challenge: Crosswords and More	PlayStation 2, PlayStation Portable, Wii
2006	Micro Machines V4	Windows, Nintendo DS, PlayStation 2, PlayStation Portable
2007	Spelling Challenges and More!	Nintendo DS, PlayStation Portable
2008	Emergency Mayhem	Wii
2012	Wrecked: Revenge Revisited	PlayStation Network, Xbox Live Arcade
2012	Top Gear: Stunt School Revolution	iOS, Android
2013	World's Biggest Wordsearch	iOS, Android
2014	Top Gear: Race The Stig	iOS, Android
2014	World's Biggest Sudoku	iOS, Android
2014	World's Biggest Crossword	iOS, Android
2015	World's Biggest Jigsaw	iOS, Android
2015	Picture Cross	iOS, Android
2016	World's Biggest Mahjong	iOS, Android
2016	World's Biggest Solitaire	iOS, Android
2016	One Clue Crossword	iOS, Android
2016	Celebrity Gems	iOS, Android
2017	Picture Perfect Crossword	iOS, Android
2017	Crossword Climber	iOS, Android
2018	Puzzle Page	iOS, Android
