= PlayStation Official Magazine – UK =

Video game magazine

- PlayStation Official Magazine – UK cover from the January 2019 issue
- Editor: Tim Clark (issues 1 to 39); Ben Wilson (issues 40 to 95); Matthew Pellett (96 to 134); Ian Dean (135 to 187)
- Categories: Computer and video games
- Frequency: Monthly
- First issue: Winter 2006
- Final issue: May 2021
- Company: Future Publishing
- Country: United Kingdom
- Language: English
- Website: officialplaystationmagazine.co.uk
- ISSN: 1752-2102
- OCLC: 85482095

PlayStation Official Magazine – UK, generally abbreviated as OPM, was a magazine based in the United Kingdom that covered PlayStation news created in 1995. Originally, individual magazine line ups were created for the first PlayStation and PlayStation 2, before the magazine relaunched during the Winter of 2006, covering from that point onwards PlayStation as a whole. Although the first issue of the relaunch was distributed in three-month intervals, from Issue 2 onward, it became a monthly segment. From Issue 7 to Issue 84, the magazine came with a playable Blu-ray demo disc for PlayStation 3; it primarily covered PlayStation 3, PlayStation 4, PlayStation 4 Pro, PlayStation VR and PlayStation 5 games and material. It also covered PlayStation Vita material. The magazine covered PlayStation, as well as all aspects of HD media in lesser detail.

On 30 April 2021, GamesRadar+ announced that the Official PlayStation Magazine title would end, citing "along with Sony we felt that the Official PlayStation Magazine had finally earned a well-deserved retirement", and the magazine would be relaunched as Play. Staff would remain the same, while subscribers to OPM would continue to be subscribed with the issues number resetting until that itself ceased publication in December 2024.

== Official UK PlayStation Magazine ==
Official UK PlayStation Magazine
- Issue 108 (March 2004) – the final edition of Official UK PlayStation Magazine, with Lara Croft on the cover
- Editor-in-Chief: Steve Jarratt (issue 1 to 7); Rob Pegley (issue 8 to 42); Mike Goldsmith (issue 43 to 63); Mark Donald (issue 64 to 76); Richard Keith (issue 77 to 97); Ryan Butt (issue 98 to 108)
- Categories: Gaming
- Frequency: 13 issues a year
- Publisher: Future Publishing UK
- First issue: November 1995
- Final issue Number: March 2004; 108
- Country: United Kingdom
- Language: English
- ISSN: 1367-4471
- OCLC: 390817337

The Official UK PlayStation Magazine was a magazine launched in November 1995 to coincide with the launch of the PlayStation console. It ran for 108 issues, with the last hitting news stands in March 2004. The first issue sold 37,000 copies. Roughly midway through its run the abbreviations in the magazine changed from PSM to OPM (this was mainly because another magazine by the name of PSM2 was launched in the 4th quarter of 2000, and so as not to cause confusion, the abbreviations of the official magazine were changed to OPM). It had 3 design changes in its lifetime: 1 to 51, 52 to 72, and finally 73 to 108.

The first game to be reviewed was Wipeout, which received 8/10. The last game to be reviewed was Ford Truck Mania, which garnered 7/10.

The magazine would go on to become not only the best selling PlayStation magazine in the United Kingdom, but the best selling videogames magazine in the world. By mid-1997, PSM was selling over 150,000 issues a month. In the month of February 1999, issue 42 (cover game: Metal Gear Solid), according to ABC the magazine managed a record 453,571, beating the UK's biggest lads magazines FHM, Maxim and Loaded.

== Official UK PlayStation 2 Magazine ==
Official UK PlayStation 2 Magazine
- Editor: Mike Goldsmith (Issue 1 to 17); Sam Richards (Issue 18 to 33); Richard Keith; Stephen Pierce; Tim Clark (issue 57 to 76); George Walter (acting ed) (issue 77 to 78); Nick Ellis (issue 79 to 94); Andy Hartup (issue 95 to 100)
- Categories: Gaming
- Frequency: 13 issues a year
- Publisher: Future Publishing UK
- First issue: December 2000
- Final issue Number: July 2008; 100
- Country: United Kingdom
- Language: English
- ISSN: 1472-3123
- OCLC: 223301420

Official UK PlayStation 2 Magazine (often abbreviated to OPS2) was launched in December 2000 as the sequel publication to the Official UK PlayStation Magazine, originally priced £4.99, to coincide with the launch of the PlayStation 2 console. Each month the magazine came with a cover-mounted playable demo DVD. It ran for 100 issues, with the last going on sale in the month of July 2008. It had four design changes in its lifetime: 1 to 25, 26 to 41, 42 to 89, and finally 90 to 100.

The first game to be reviewed was Tekken Tag Tournament, which received 8/10. The last game to be reviewed was SBK-08: Superbike World Championship, which earned 7/10. The magazine would go on to become the UK's best selling PlayStation 2 magazine, peaking with 197,348 readers in 2002.

=== Target demographic ===
In the beginning, OPS2 was designed for the early adopter, encompassing hardcore gamers and previous readers crossing over from the original Official UK PlayStation Magazine.; this ran from issue 1 (December 2000) to 25 (October 2002). Starting from issue 26, the magazine was set the task of attracting a more mass market, mainstream audience, including a full redesign. From issue 34, OPS2 changed again, this time retaining its recent redesign. In a drastic attempt to attract a more young male demographic — similar to that of the independent PlayStation magazines of the '90s — the publication decided to "review" readers' girlfriends and their mothers and increased the number of scantily-clad women, even to the point of including bare breasts. It received a mixed response from readers, and failed to considerably increase the readership. In turn, the magazine featured another redesign from issue 42. OPS2 would retain this middle ground for the next three years, neither employing an overly male nor hardcore adult gamer stance. In the final year, as the PlayStation 2 entered a more family-friendly stage, OPS2 changed once more, this time for its final time. Starting from issue 90, the magazine would focus on new PS2 owners and the younger gamer.

== Awards ==
- In 2004, OPSM2 won the prestigious Industry Dinner Magazine of the Year Award.
- In 2004, OPSM2 publication won MCV's Magazine Team of the Year Award.
- In 1998 and 1999, OPSM won the prestigious Industry Dinner Magazine of the Year Award.

== Regular features ==
The magazine's design follows the same approximate structure each issue. Recurring segments include:

- The Big 10, in which the ten most momentous PlayStation-related pieces of news are discussed.
- Agenda, which contains the game sales charts for all three major PlayStation platforms as well as a Personal column and regulars like Culture, where PlayStation super fans show off their art, models and tributes. It also shows off the latest Sony gadgets (mainly phones and cameras) as well as "Lust have kit".
- Previews and reviews sections.
- Blu-ray movies section in which the latest Blu-ray releases are reviewed.
- Contact, in which letters and emails from readers are shown and replied to, this section also includes a corner dedicated to "what's on my hard drive" where people talk about what games, videos, music, photos and friends are on their PS3 and several wall posts from the Official U.S. PlayStation Magazine Facebook page.
- Directory, which houses a "Buyer's Guide" for games for the main platforms as well as for HDTVs.

=== OPM ===
From issues #1 to #51, the magazine followed a set format every month:

- StartUp (featuring a quick run through of the games featured on the cover disc and editor's letter)
- Update (news, interviews and first looks. With each page, a 'Loading Bar' percentage increased)
- PrePlay (previews)
- Letters (this was later moved to the back of the magazine in a section called 'Down Loading')
- Features
- PlayTest (reviews)
- Cheats (later called 'Top Secret', a special section which was printed on recycled paper)
- Down Loading
- On the CD (demo game controls)
- Next Month

=== OPS2 ===
- Spy (news and the latest announcements)
- Monitor (previews, as voted for by the readers)
- Features
- Next Month
- Letters
- Replay (looking at previously reviewed titles, review A to Z, cheats)
- Comedown (DVD and Music reviews)
- On the Disc

== Demo disc ==
Each month the publication comes with a cover mounted playable demo disc — a first for a console magazine. The disc contains game demos and other PlayStation-related content which have to be downloaded and installed onto the PS3's hard drive.

Although some of the demos are also available on the PlayStation Network, there will be some exclusive content on certain discs. It has also been stated that the magazine will receive exclusive content in the future to be published on the disc.

== Reviews ==
Usually, one member of the team is assigned to review a certain new game, although on occasion other staff members will provide "2up" or a second opinion. Sometimes there are also pie charts to describe the contents, or what you do in the game. Also used are score poles to compare reviews, as well as describing the influences. And as with the "2up" segment, there is a "dev talk" article giving a short statement from the games developer. Reviews are scored out of ten.

The magazine also presents its "highest accolade", the Gold Award, to any game that its staff believe "demonstrates significant innovation, near-flawless gameplay, great graphics and long-lasting appeal." Games do not necessarily have to have a perfect 10 out of 10 score to receive it; those that have received this award include FIFA 09, FIFA 11, Metal Gear Solid 4: Guns of the Patriots, Mirror's Edge, Grand Theft Auto IV, Warhawk, The Elder Scrolls IV: Oblivion, Call of Duty 4: Modern Warfare, Siren: Blood Curse, Uncharted: Drake's Fortune, Soulcalibur IV, LittleBigPlanet, Resistance 2, Ratchet & Clank Future: Tools of Destruction, Ratchet & Clank: A Crack in Time, Infamous, BioShock, Uncharted 2: Among Thieves, Killzone 2, Assassin's Creed II, Heavy Rain, and Red Dead Redemption for the PlayStation 3; Tomb Raider: Anniversary for the PlayStation 2; and God of War: Chains of Olympus and Final Fantasy Tactics: The War of the Lions for the PlayStation Portable.

The only game to receive a 0 rating was the DVD version of Time Traveler.

== Editorial staff ==
As of Issue 140, the team listed on the magazine's first page consists of:

- Ian Dean – Editor
- Milford Coppock – Managing art editor
- Miriam McDonald – Operations editor
- Oscar Taylor-Kent – Games editor
- Jessica Kinghorn – Staff writer

== Top Ten Readers Poll ==
In issue 50 (October 2010), the magazine published the results of the readers poll on the greatest PlayStation title ever released.

Top Ten listing

Number	Game
1	Uncharted 2: Among Thieves
2	Metal Gear Solid
3	Final Fantasy VII
4	Grand Theft Auto: Vice City
5	Metal Gear Solid 4: Guns of the Patriots
6	Metal Gear Solid 3: Snake Eater
7	Call of Duty 4: Modern Warfare
8	Shadow of the Colossus
9	Red Dead Redemption
10	Resident Evil 4

== Desert Island Games ==
In the final March 2004 issue, the magazine published their list of the official top 10 PlayStation games of all time.

No.	Game	Publisher (PAL)	Developer	Release (PAL)
1	ISS Pro Evolution 2	Konami	KCE Tokyo	2001
2	Metal Gear Solid	Konami	KCE Japan	1999
3	Tomb Raider	Eidos Interactive	Core Design	1996
4	Gran Turismo 2	SCEE	Polyphony Digital	2000
5	Tony Hawk's Pro Skater 2	Activision	Neversoft	2000
6	Resident Evil 2	Virgin Interactive	Capcom	1998
7	PaRappa the Rapper	SCEE	NanaOn-Sha	1997
8	Medal of Honor	Electronic Arts	DreamWorks Interactive	1999
9	Circuit Breakers	Mindscape	Supersonic Software	1998
10	Tekken 2	SCEE	Namco	1996

== Hall of Fame ==
With the new look, the magazine published their Hall of Fame for each platform.

Top Fifteen listing (Twenty-Five for PlayStation 4)

Number	PS3	PS4	PS5	PS VR	PSVita
1	The Last of Us	Uncharted 4: A Thief's End	Demons Souls	Rez Infinite	Tearaway
2	Grand Theft Auto V	The Last Guardian	Miles Morales	Thumper	Persona 4 Golden
3	Uncharted 2: Among Thieves	Metal Gear Solid V: The Phantom Pain	Astro's Playroom	Keep Talking and Nobody Explodes	Rayman Legends
4	Red Dead Redemption	Grand Theft Auto V	Mortal Kombat 11	Statik	Velocity 2X
5	Journey	Persona 5	Dirt 5	Resident Evil VII: Biohazard	Little Big Planet
6	Mass Effect 2	The Witcher 3: Wild Hunt – Game of the Year Edition	The Pathless	Star Wars Battlefront Rogue One: X-Wing VR Mission	Super Meat Boy!
7	Dark Souls	Horizon Zero Dawn	NBA 2K21	RIGS: Mechanized Combat League	Final Fantasy X/X-2 HD Remaster
8	Call of Duty 4: Modern Warfare	Bloodborne	Observer System: Redux	Star Trek: Bridge Crew	Gravity Rush
9	Portal 2	Injustice 2	Sackboy: A Big Adventure	Batman: Arkham VR	Metal Gear Solid HD Collection
10	Metal Gear Solid 4: Guns of the Patriots	Resident Evil VII: Biohazard	Immortals: Fenyx Rising	Farpoint	Spelunky
11	BioShock Infinite	Street Fighter V	Devil May Cry 5	The Playroom VR	Steins;Gate
12	Batman: Arkham City	Destiny: The Collection	Godfall	Werewolves Within	Hotline Miami
13	The Walking Dead: Season One	Dishonored 2	FIFA 21	PlayStation VR Worlds	Crypt of the Necrodancer
14	Heavy Rain	Titanfall 2	Haven	Tumble VR	Downwell
15	LittleBigPlanet 2	The Last of Us Remastered		Gnog	Uncharted: Golden Abyss
16		Overwatch			
17		Tekken 7			
18		Nioh			
19		The Elder Scrolls V: Skyrim Special Edition			
20		Dark Souls III			
21		The Witness			
22		Dirt 4			
23		Yakuza 0			
24		Inside			
25		What Remains of Edith Finch			

== Related magazines ==
=== Ireland ===
Official PlayStation Magazine – Ireland (OIPM) was a TP Media monthly gaming publication. The first issue was published in May 2000.

The magazine was conceived by TP Media. Ireland's large PlayStation adoption rate and the greatly increased prices of imported UK publications at the time were contributing factors in launching such a magazine. The Official UK PlayStation Magazine published by Future Publishing could cost up to £9.99 IEP due to Irish import fees.

Although the first three issues of the magazine had the same cover as the UK magazine, OIPM's content was original and written by a team in Ireland, headed by Kevin MacDermot. Certain features were directly taken from the UK version. The magazine's A-Z section was also taken from the UK version, although all future entries were based on OIPM's reviews, not the UK ones.

=== Australia ===
PlayStation Official Magazine – Australia is a video games magazine published by Future Australia. The first issue was published in March 2007.

The magazine's origin dates back to the original PlayStation console. The magazine was called "Official Australian PlayStation Magazine". As the era changed, it would be rebranded as "Official PlayStation 2 Magazine-Australia". Finally, to coincide with the release of the PlayStation 3, it was rebranded again as "PlayStation Official Magazine – Australia". The magazine's title is often abbreviated to OPM.
