= Micro Machines (video game series) =

- Developers: Codemasters, Big Red Software, Merit Studios, Mindscape, Supersonic Software, Infogrames Sheffield House
- Publishers: Codemasters, Camerica, Ocean Software, Midway, THQ, Infogrames, Chillingo
- Platforms: NES, Amiga, Game Gear, Master System, Mega Drive, MS-DOS, CD-i, Super NES, Game Boy, PlayStation, Windows, Nintendo 64, Game Boy Color, PlayStation 2, GameCube, Xbox, Game Boy Advance, PlayStation Portable, Nintendo DS, Linux, OS X, PlayStation 4, Xbox One
- First release: Micro Machines; 1991
- Latest release: Micro Machines World Series; 29 June 2017

Micro Machines is a series of video games featuring toy cars, developed by Codemasters and published on multiple platforms (MS-DOS, Nintendo Entertainment System, Amiga, Sega Mega Drive/Genesis, Super Nintendo Entertainment System, Game Boy, PlayStation 2, Nintendo 64, GameCube, Xbox, Game Gear, and iOS). The series is based on the Micro Machines toy line of miniature vehicles.

Micro Machines games feature tracks based on household settings: for example, kitchen tables and desktops. The tracks also contain obstacles in the form of household items; often the possibility of falling off the track is a hazard in itself.

== Games ==
=== Micro Machines (1991) ===
Micro Machines, the first game in the series, laid the foundation of the gameplay: a top-down racing game with miniature vehicles. The race tracks are unconventionally themed. For example, some races take place on a billiard table while others occur in a garden. The cartridge itself was sold in several versions. There was a gold (black in PAL regions) cartridge with a switch at the bottom in order to enable or disable the hardware needed to bypass the console's 10NES chip. In Europe there was also a version where the cartridge was in the form of a plug through cartridge, a cartridge you plugged on another, normal NES cartridge and then inserted it in the machine. It was also released as an add-on to the Aladdin Deck Enhancer created by Codemasters.

A remake of this game was later released in 2002. This version features advanced graphics as well as drivers having unique vehicles.

A free-to-play port for iOS devices was released on 14 July 2016, and Android devices and Remix OS computers later in November. Published by EA subsidiary Chillingo and developed by Codemasters, the game, based extensively on PC, PS3 and Xbox 360 racing game Toybox Turbos, allows players to compete against one another across the internet, local WiFi or Bluetooth in races and vehicular battles. Although free to play, the game features in-app purchases allowing players to speed up progress by purchasing coins and gems, which in turn are used to buy additional parts for a variety of cars, ranging from transportation such as buses and taxis to rally cars, military vehicles and construction equipment. Players can also join a club of other racers and compete with other clubs for weekly rewards.

Plagued with server and coding issues, Chillingo retired the game and closed the servers in August 2018.

=== Micro Machines 2: Turbo Tournament (1994) ===
Micro Machines 2: Turbo Tournament was released in 1994 and featured vehicles which required different handling techniques for each course, including hovercraft and helicopters. There are different playing modes including "head-to-head", in which each player earns points by driving a full screen ahead of the opponent. TV presenter Violet Berlin features as a playable driver. The MS-DOS version featured a track editor which allowed players to create their own custom vehicles, backgrounds and obstacles and export and import tracks.

A selling point for the Sega Genesis/Mega Drive version was the J-Cart, a cartridge including two control ports, thus eliminating the need for a 4-player adaptor. It also included a 'pad-sharing' feature that allowed 2 players to share a single joypad; thus it enabled 8 players to compete simultaneously on certain tracks.

An updated version of Micro Machines 2: Turbo Tournament was only released in PAL regions for the Mega Drive entitled Micro Machines Turbo Tournament '96. The updated version featured new tracks combined with some updated tracks from Micro Machines 2. It also featured a track construction kit previously included in the MS-DOS version.

=== Micro Machines Military (1996) ===
Only released as a J-Cart in PAL regions for the Sega Mega Drive, this game features all new tracks and military vehicles. These vehicles feature weapons enabling the player to attack opponents. The game was developed by Supersonic Software.

=== Micro Machines V3 (1997) ===
Micro Machines V3 featured 3D-graphics and 8-player multiplayer matches. It featured circuits in different areas of the household and had multiple weapons; it also included the controller share multiplayer option.

=== Micro Maniacs (2000) ===
Micro Maniacs is a racing game that takes an unconventional step considering it a near spin-off as part of the series. It does so by replacing the vehicles by running characters, though they occasionally use vehicles for certain tracks, such as jet-skis, skate-boards or even bees. It also features 3D graphics and up to 8-player multiplayer games. The 12 available characters each have different special attacks. The name of one of these characters, 'V4', suggests that this is the actual fourth game in the series.

=== Micro Machines (2002) ===
Micro Machines is the first reboot of the Micro Machines series and released for Sony's PlayStation 2, Nintendo's GameCube, Microsoft's Xbox and Nintendo's Game Boy Advance. It isn't highly regarded and therefore is a somewhat forgotten entry to the series.

=== Micro Machines V4 (2006) ===
Micro Machines V4 is widely considered as the true sequel to Micro Machines V3. It features over 25 tracks, 750 vehicles and a track editor, although the track editor is not present in the PSP or DS versions. Tracks also feature new settings such as a supermarket or swimming pool. The game was developed by Supersonic Software Ltd.

=== Micro Machines World Series (2017) ===
Micro Machines World Series was released on 29 June 2017.

== Reception ==
Electronic Gaming Monthly gave the Game Gear version of the first game a 6.75 out of 10, citing the variety of unique track settings, good graphics, and general fun of the game. GamePro was more critical; they commented that the game is very charming with its track designs and props, but the sounds are average even by Game Gear standards and the races "aren't that involving", citing the sameness of the vehicles and the lack of a clock. They nonetheless concluded that "younger gamers will eat up this sugary game, though veterans may get a toothache from all the sweetness". The game was ranked the 14th best game of all time by Amiga Power, while Mega placed the game at #10 in their Top Mega Drive Games of All Time. MegaTech gave the game 92% and a Hyper Game award.

The 93% review in Mega described Micro Machines 2: Turbo Tournament as "multi-player fun at its best".

== See also ==
- Ignition - a similar top-down small cars racing game published by Virgin Interactive in 1996.
- VS. Racing 2 - a similar racing game with a top-down perspective made for iOS in 2012.
- Table Top Racing - a similar racing game involving racing toy cars in household environments, released for iOS in 2012.
- Hot Wheels Unleashed - a similar racing game developed and published by Milestone based on Mattel's Hot Wheels toyline, released in 2021.
