= Mark Swift =

British film producer in animation

Mark Swift is a British film producer at DreamWorks Animation.

== Early life and education ==
Mark Swift was born in Bearwood, West Midlands in England to Jim Swift, a bus driver, and Eileen, a cleaner, with Mark being the fifth of seven children. Mark is also the uncle of James 'Paddy' Swift, an up-and-coming amateur boxer and property investor who owns a substantial property portfolio across Birmingham. He was raised in Birmingham, attending school in Edgbaston at Cardinal Newman School and at St Philip's College before taking economics at Manchester University.

== Career ==
After graduation, Swift became acquainted with American filmmaker Steven Spielberg after being hired as a runner for the 1988 animated/live-action film Who Framed Roger Rabbit, which was shot in London. He later became an assistant production manager at Spielberg's Amblimation, an animation studio he worked at from 1989 to 1995.

After Spielberg co-founded the film studio DreamWorks SKG with Jeffrey Katzenberg and David Geffen in 1994, Swift moved to the United States to work at DreamWorks Animation. At DreamWorks, Swift served as production supervisor for The Prince of Egypt (1998) and as production manager for The Road to El Dorado (2000). His role as a film producer began with the 2004 film Shark Tale, for which he served as associate producer; a year later, he received full producer credit alongside Teresa Cheng for the short film The Madagascar Penguins in a Christmas Caper. By 2008, Swift received his first full producer credit for a feature-length film in Madagascar: Escape 2 Africa, released in November 2008. He would eventually serve as producer for the succeeding Madagascar films: Madagascar 3: Europe's Most Wanted (2012) and Penguins of Madagascar (2014).

In the 2010s, Swift pushed for an adaptation of the Captain Underpants book series among DreamWorks executives, having enjoyed reading the books with his children and knowing that the studio already acquired the adaptation rights. Although CEO Jeffrey Katzenberg was not inclined to adapting the book series, the project was announced in 2013, and Swift was brought onboard to produce Captain Underpants: The First Epic Movie (2017) alongside Mireille Soria. Swift helped ensure that the film's computer animation style remained a faithful translation of author Dav Pilkey's illustrations for the books.

In 2017, in the aftermath of Comcast's acquisition of DreamWorks Animation (through NBCUniversal), Swift was brought on as producer for The Croods: A New Age, in which he helped director Joel Crawford in deciding how to revise the story from initial scripts while maintaining its basic premise. The film was eventually released during the COVID-19 pandemic in 2020, and in recent years, Swift continued serving as producer for films involving Crawford and Januel Mercado, such as Puss in Boots: The Last Wish (2022) and Forgotten Island (2026). He has since cited Puss in Boots as his favorite among the films he has produced for DreamWorks.

== Personal life ==
Swift is married to an American wife, with whom he has three children in San Francisco. He has described himself as a lapsed Catholic.

== Filmography ==
=== Film ===
==== As producer ====
Year	Title	Director	Note(s)
2004	Shark Tale	Vicky Jenson; Bibo Bergeron; Rob Letterman	as associate producer
2005	The Madagascar Penguins in a Christmas Caper	Gary Trousdale	short film with Teresa Cheng
2007	Bee Movie	Simon J. Smith; Steve Hickner	as co-producer
2008	Madagascar: Escape 2 Africa	Eric Darnell; Tom McGrath	with Mireille Soria
2011	Megamind: The Button of Doom	Simon J. Smith	short film
2012	Madagascar 3: Europe's Most Wanted	Eric Darnell; Conrad Vernon; Tom McGrath	with Mireille Soria
2014	Penguins of Madagascar	Eric Darnell; Simon J. Smith	with Lara Breay
2017	Captain Underpants: The First Epic Movie	David Soren	with Mireille Soria
2020	The Croods: A New Age	Joel Crawford	
2022	Puss in Boots: The Last Wish	Joel Crawford; Januel Mercado (co-director)	
2023	Puss in Boots: The Trident	Matt Flynn	short film as executive producer
2026	Forgotten Island	Joel Crawford; Januel Mercado	

==== As story writer ====
Year	Title	Director	Note(s)
2021	Dear Diary: World's First Pranks	Januel P. Mercado	short film with Joel Crawford, Januel P. Mercado, James Ryan

==== Miscellaneous ====
Year	Title	Credited as	Director	Note(s)
1991	An American Tail: Fievel Goes West	Production assistant	Phil Nibbelink; Simon Wells	
1993	We're Back! A Dinosaur's Story	Assistant to directors	Dick & Ralph Zondag; Phil Nibbelink; Simon Wells	
1995	Balto	Assistant production manager	Simon Wells	
1998	The Prince of Egypt	Production supervisor	Brenda Chapman; Steve Hickner; Simon Wells	
2000	The Road to El Dorado	Production manager	Bibo Bergeron; Don Paul	
2009	Merry Madagascar	—N/a	David Soren	television special special thanks

== Accolades ==
Year	Award-giving body	Category	Work	Result	Ref.
2018	45th Annie Awards	Best Animated Feature	Captain Underpants: The First Epic Movie	Nominated	
2021	78th Golden Globes	Best Animated Feature Film	The Croods: A New Age	Nominated	
2021	48th Annie Awards	Best Animated Feature	The Croods: A New Age	Nominated	
2023	80th Golden Globes	Best Animated Feature Film	Puss in Boots: The Last Wish	Nominated	
2023	76th British Academy Film Awards	Best Animated Film	Puss in Boots: The Last Wish	Nominated	
2023	50th Annie Awards	Best Animated Feature	Puss in Boots: The Last Wish	Nominated	
2023	95th Academy Awards	Best Animated Feature Film	Puss in Boots: The Last Wish	Nominated	
