= Captain Underpants: The First Epic Movie =

2017 film directed by David Soren

- Theatrical release poster
- Directed by: David Soren
- Screenplay by: Nicholas Stoller
- Based on: Captain Underpants by Dav Pilkey
- Produced by: Mireille Soria; Mark Swift
- Starring: Kevin Hart; Ed Helms; Nick Kroll; Thomas Middleditch; Jordan Peele; Kristen Schaal
- Edited by: Matthew Landon
- Music by: Theodore Shapiro
- Production company: DreamWorks Animation
- Distributed by: 20th Century Fox (Note: In 2018, the film's distribution rights were transferred from 20th Century Fox to Universal Pictures, following NBCUniversal's acquisition of DreamWorks Animation in 2016.)
- Release dates: May 21, 2017 (Regency Village Theater); June 2, 2017 (United States)
- Running time: 89 minutes
- Country: United States
- Language: English
- Budget: $38 million
- Box office: $125.4 million

Captain Underpants: The First Epic Movie is a 2017 American animated superhero comedy film produced by DreamWorks Animation and based on the children's novel series Captain Underpants by Dav Pilkey. The film was directed by David Soren, written by Nicholas Stoller, and features the voices of Kevin Hart, Ed Helms, Nick Kroll, Thomas Middleditch, Jordan Peele, and Kristen Schaal. In the film, two fourth-grade pranksters named George (Hart) and Harold (Middleditch) hypnotize their mean humorless principal named Mr. Krupp (Helms) into thinking he is a superhero named Captain Underpants to avoid them being put in separate classrooms.

DreamWorks acquired the film rights to the novel series in 2011, with CEO Jeffrey Katzenberg initially reluctant to adapting the material. During production, Soren and producer Mark Swift worked with Pilkey in ensuring the film's accuracy to the books' illustrations and spirit. Captain Underpants: The First Epic Movie premiered at the Regency Village Theater in Los Angeles on May 21, 2017, and was released theatrically in the United States on June 2 by 20th Century Fox. The film received positive reviews from critics and grossed $125 million against a budget of $38 million. This was the last DreamWorks movie to be released by Fox, as their five-year distribution deal ended afterwards.

A spin-off television series The Epic Tales of Captain Underpants was released on Netflix on July 13, 2018, while a spin-off film Dog Man was released by Universal Pictures on January 31, 2025.

== Plot ==
In Piqua, Ohio, best friends and next-door neighbors George Beard and Harold Hutchins create comic books, their latest creation being a superhero named Captain Underpants. They are fourth-graders at Jerome Horwitz Elementary School, where their excessive pranks to cheer up their fellow students put them at odds with their cruel principal Benjamin Krupp. One day, they tamper with their classmate Melvin Sneedly's invention, the Turbo Toilet 2000, to lift the other students' spirits, but Mr. Krupp uses one of Melvin's other inventions to record the boys enacting the prank. He prepares to put George and Harold in separate classes in hopes of ending their friendship.

George hypnotizes Mr. Krupp using a 3-D Hypno-Ring from a cereal box prize before Mr. Krupp can sign the papers to separate George and Harold. They command Mr. Krupp to become Captain Underpants, leading him to cause trouble around town. After taking him to their treehouse, the boys discover that they can turn Captain Underpants back into Mr. Krupp by splashing water on him and back into Captain Underpants by snapping their fingers. They come up with a clever plan to keep Mr. Krupp from separating them by convincing Captain Underpants that Mr. Krupp is his secret identity. His change in personality attracts the attention of the school's shy lunch lady Edith.

Meanwhile, Professor Pee-Pee Diarrheastein Poopypants Esquire is hired as the school's new science teacher, though George and Harold are suspicious of his violent behavior. Poopypants, who invented a Nobel Prize-winning "sizerator", is sick of never being taken seriously due to his name, and seeks to eliminate all laughter. George and Harold continue with their plan by making the school a livelier place, with Captain Underpants as principal. However, a rainstorm turns Captain Underpants back into Mr. Krupp, who officially places George and Harold in separate classes, because their plan failed.

Poopypants and Melvin grow the Turbo Toilet 2000, power it with Edith's toxic leftovers, and use it to attack the school. Poopypants uses Melvin's brain, which lacks the part that causes laughter, to power a ray that turns the students into dull, humorless zombies. Captain Underpants tries to stop them but, having no superpowers, is thrown into the toxic waste. George and Harold are captured, but the power of a joke that made them friends in kindergarten overloads the Turbo Toilet 2000, returning the kids to normal and trapping Melvin in giant toilet paper. The toxic leftovers give Captain Underpants real superpowers and, with George and Harold's help, he defeats and shrinks Poopypants, who escapes on a bee.

Unable to control Captain Underpants forever, George and Harold destroy the 3-D Hypno-Ring to permanently change him back into Mr. Krupp, but swear to remain friends. However, after realizing that Mr. Krupp would be nicer if he had friends, they set him and Edith up on a date, causing Krupp to have a change of heart and return the comics he confiscated from George and Harold. Meanwhile, the toxic waste from the Turbo Toilet 2000 transforms the toilets at a scrapyard into an army of Talking Toilets, which attack the restaurant where Mr. Krupp and Edith are dining. After unwittingly snapping his fingers, Mr. Krupp is once again transformed into Captain Underpants, to Edith's surprise and admiration, and he flies away with George and Harold to face their next adventure together.

== Voice cast ==
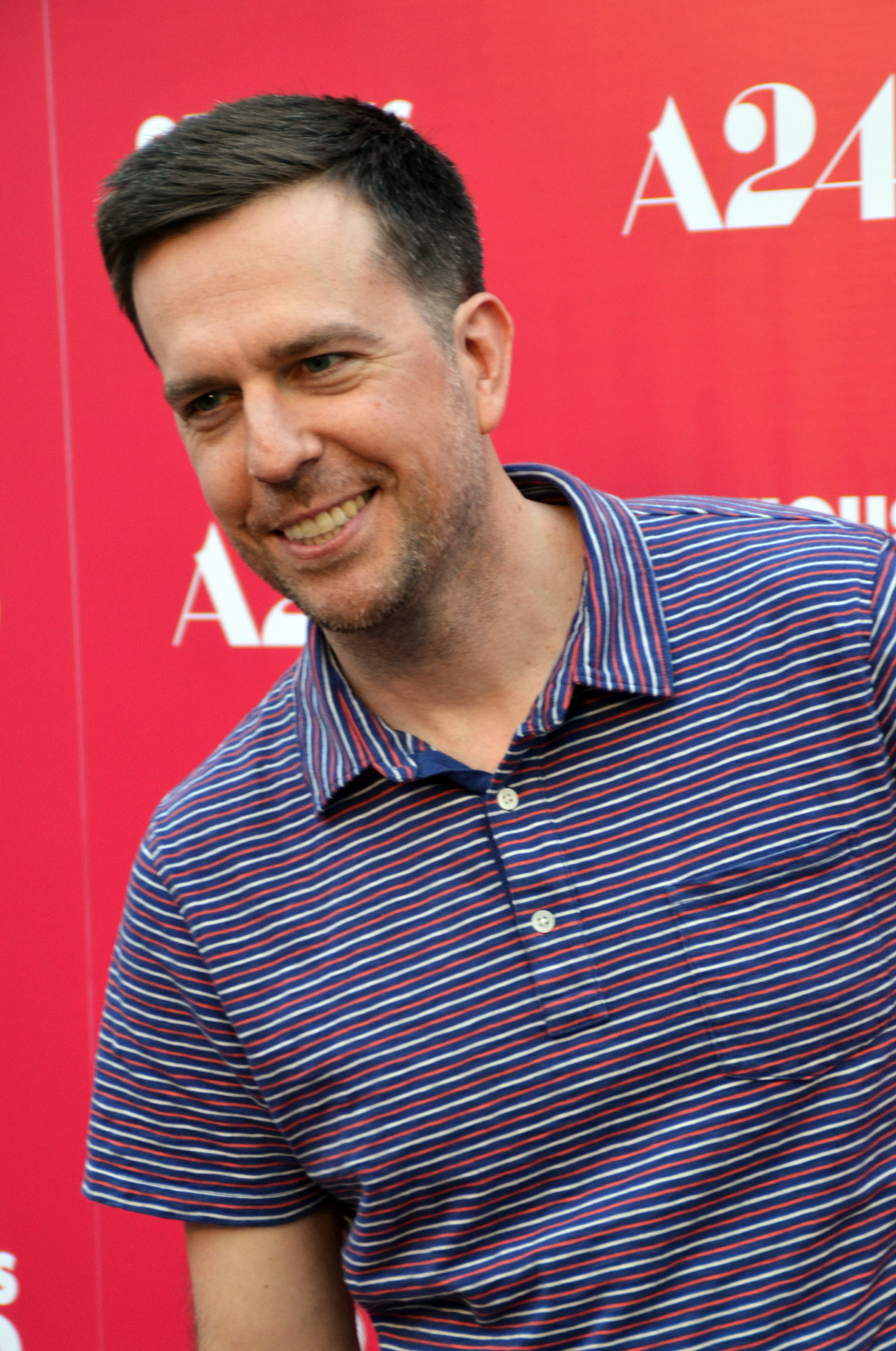
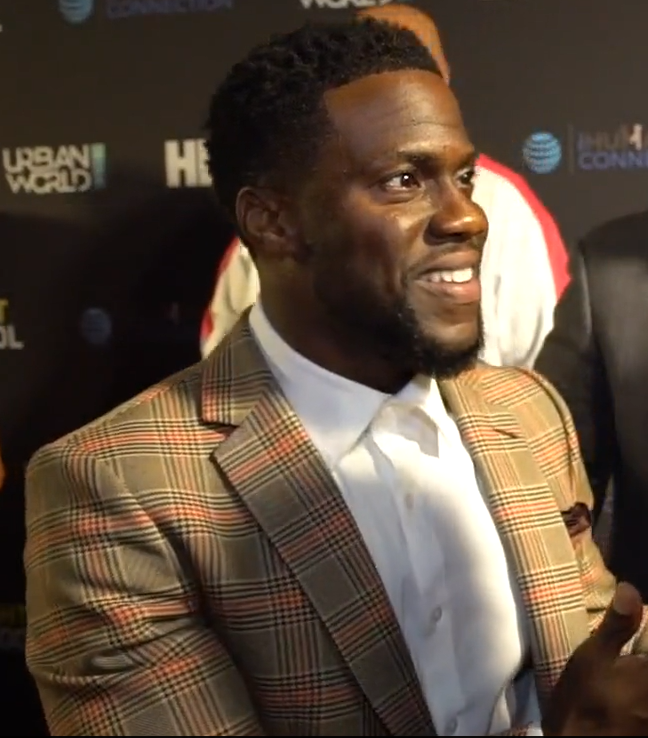
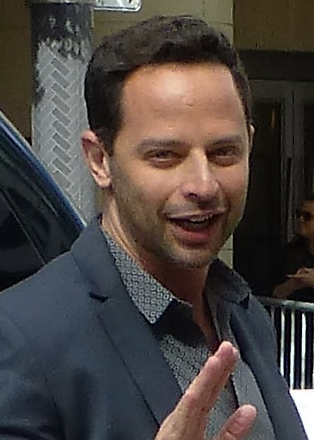
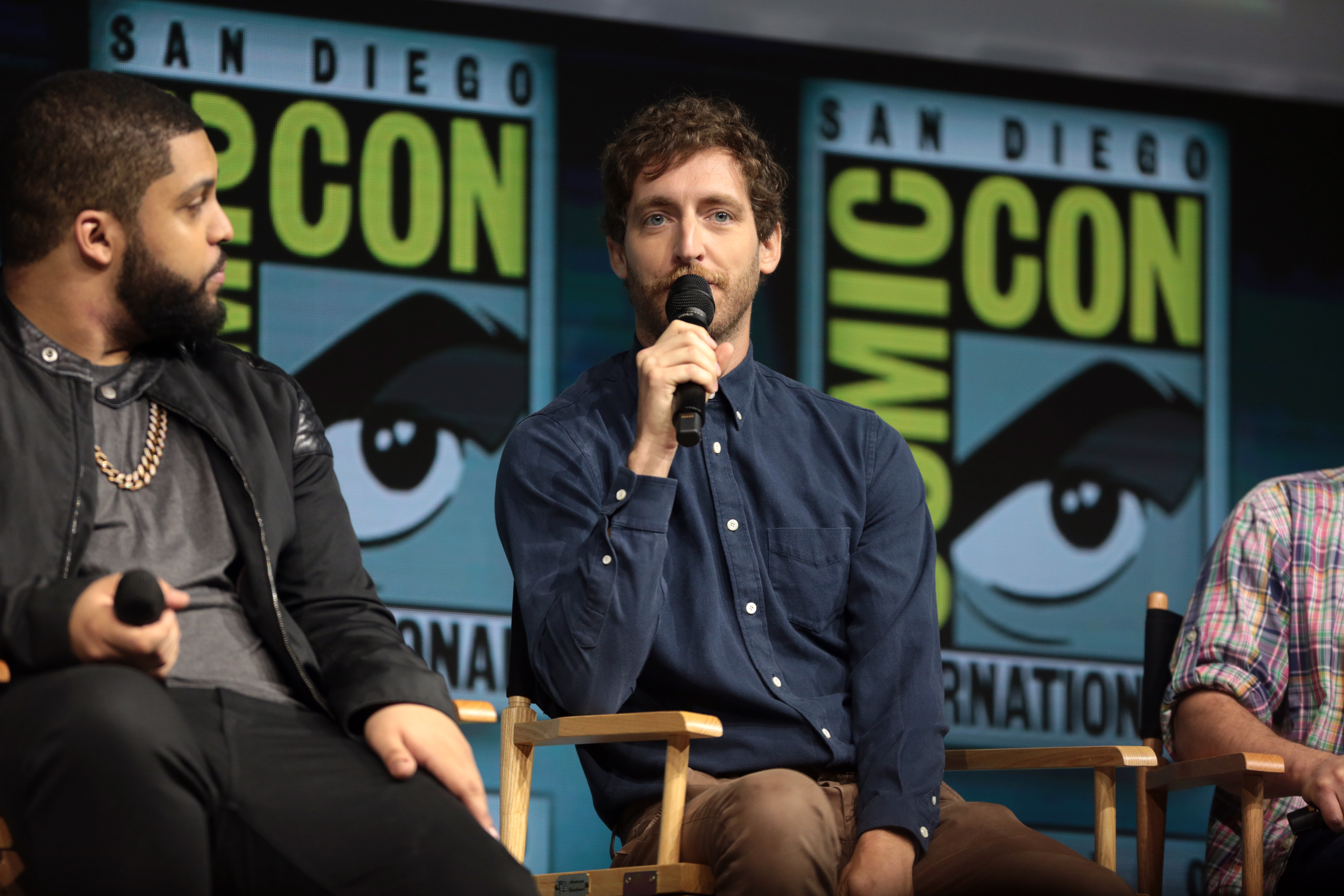
The main cast of the film played by Ed Helms (Mr. Krupp/Captain Underpants), Kevin Hart (George Beard), Nick Kroll (Professor Poopypants), and Thomas Middleditch (Harold Hutchins).
- Kevin Hart as George Beard, a fourth-grade student who is best friends with Harold. Together, they make comic books, with George writing. He is typically calmer in tough situations.
- Ed Helms as Mr. Benjamin “Benny” Krupp / Captain Underpants, the grumpy and cruel principal of Jerome Horwitz Elementary School. George and Harold hypnotize him into becoming Captain Underpants, a superhero they created, to stop him from putting them in separate classes.
- Nick Kroll as Professor Pee-Pee Diarrheastein Poopypants Esquire, a ruthless and humorless German-accented mad scientist from New Swissland. He plots to take over the world to eliminate all laughter after years of being constantly disparaged for his name.
- Thomas Middleditch as Harold Hutchins, a fourth-grade student who is best friends with George. He illustrates the stories George writes. He is usually cautious and worrisome in tough situations. Harold is friendly and has a fondness for dolphins.
- Jordan Peele as Melvin Sneedly, George and Harold's nerdy enemy. He is a child prodigy who becomes Professor Poopypants' sidekick due to lacking a sense of humor.
- Kristen Schaal as Edith, the shy school lunch lady and the love interest of Mr. Krupp. She was first created for the film, and was partially based on Edith Anthrope from the book series, who was featured as a separate character.

== Production ==
DreamWorks Pictures and DreamWorks Animation's first interests in the film distribution rights to the Captain Underpants book series dates back to when the first book installment was published on September 1, 1997, but creator Dav Pilkey declined it. In a 2000 interview with Karen Heller from Philly.com, Pilkey expressed his first interests in the late Chris Farley as Captain Underpants, adding that he would only want a Captain Underpants film to be animated. In one effort to persuade him, DreamWorks gave Pilkey a tour around their studio with everyone wearing underpants over their pants, which made him laugh. On October 19, 2011, his representatives indicated Pilkey was ready, and DreamWorks Animation won the rights in an auction. Although CEO Jeffrey Katzenberg was not inclined to adapting the book series into a film, the project was greenlit by DreamWorks, and on October 25, 2013, Rob Letterman and Nicholas Stoller were announced as the director and screenwriter respectively, and both had previously worked together on the 2010 20th Century Fox film Gulliver's Travels. On January 21, 2014, the cast was announced: Ed Helms as Captain Underpants/Mr. Krupp, Kevin Hart as George Beard, Thomas Middleditch as Harold Hutchins, Nick Kroll as George and Harold's "insidious villain" Professor Poopypants, and Jordan Peele as George and Harold's "nerdy nemesis" Melvin Sneedly.

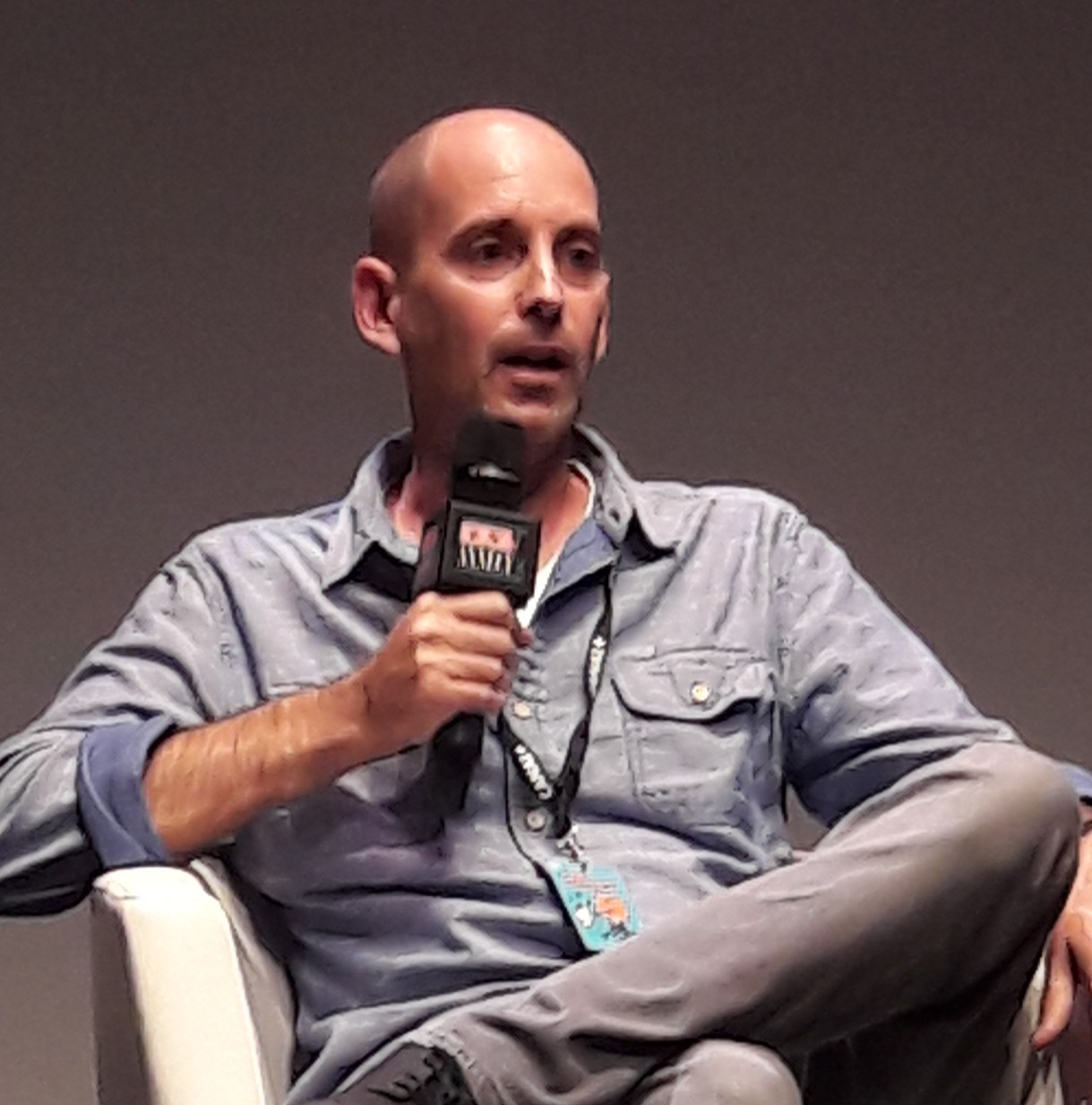
Director David Soren screened Captain Underpants: The First Epic Movie at the 2017 Annecy International Animation Film Festival.

On June 12, 2014, DreamWorks Animation announced a January 13, 2017 release date. Following DreamWorks Animation's reorganization and the corporate shutdown of Pacific Data Images on January 22, 2015, due to the box-office failures of their following two different 2014 fully-fledged feature-form films, Mr. Peabody & Sherman and Penguins of Madagascar, the studio announced that the film would be produced outside of the studio's pipeline at a significantly low cost, it was instead animated at Mikros Image in Montreal, Canada, and at Technicolor Animation Productions in France, and therefore managed to translate Pilkey's original drawing style for CG animation. Producer Mark Swift, who supported the project's initial greenlight, helped ensure the film's animation style would remain accurate to Pilkey's illustrations, having been a fan of Captain Underpants since reading the books with his children. A month later, Letterman left the project but came back as an executive producer, and David Soren, the director of the 2013 film Turbo, entered talks to direct the film.

During production, Pilkey got to work closely with Soren. He was relieved that Soren was directing since he was a fan of Turbo. In an interview with Los Angeles Times, Pilkey said: "Once I met David, it was like a huge load fell off my back; I was like, 'I don't even have to think about this anymore. Just send me a couple of tickets to the premiere.'" Commenting back, Soren said, "In a way, the controversy over the books ended up being liberating for the film. Normally on an animated movie, you're trying to appeal to every possible demographic, and often that results in your content being watered down a little bit. Obviously, we hope we get as wide of an audience as possible. But it's likely that if people have issues with the books they may have issues with the movie too, and we didn't feel like we needed to waste a lot of time trying to rope them in. It allowed us to make the purest version of the movie." Soren said that he took inspiration from John Hughes films. In an interview with MovieFreak, he mentioned:

"We actually looked at a lot of John Hughes movies for inspiration, like Ferris Bueller's Day Off and Weird Science. John Hughes had this great knack for making comedies like this. Both of those movies have great friendships at the center of them. He seemed to be able to tap into the voice of a generation. They're very funny, all of his movies, but they are also poignant and they actually have meaningful things to say, which I think is why they have stood the test of time. So there's timelessness to his work that we were attempting to go for with this."

== Music ==
The soundtrack is produced by Adam Anders and Peer Åström and featured music from Andy Grammer, Adam Lambert, Cold War Kids member Nathan Willett, and Lil Yachty, along with the theme song written by "Weird Al" Yankovic. The album featuring 11 tracks was released digitally on June 2, 2017, by Virgin Records and Deep Well Records. The original score was scored by Theodore Shapiro, which was released into a 24-track album through Back Lot Music on June 9.

== Release ==
=== Theatrical ===
Captain Underpants: The First Epic Movie was previously scheduled to be released on March 10, 2017, but on September 18, 2015, The Boss Baby took over its date. The film was then moved to June 2, 2017. Other territories such as Europe and Asia received the film between July and October 2017. The film first premiered at the Regency Village Theater in Los Angeles, California in the United States on May 21, 2017. The film was chosen alongside with the 2017 Columbia Pictures and Sony Pictures Animation film The Emoji Movie to inaugurate the removal of Saudi Arabia's cinema ban through a double feature screening on January 13, 2018, organized by Cinema 70, they were both of the first two movies to be given an official public screening in the country in 35 years.

Captain Underpants: The First Epic Movie was the last DreamWorks Animation film to be distributed by 20th Century Fox, following Comcast and NBCUniversal's acquisition of DreamWorks Animation in 2016. Starting with How to Train Your Dragon: The Hidden World, all DreamWorks Animation films would be distributed by Universal Pictures.

=== Home media ===
Captain Underpants: The First Epic Movie was first released digitally in the United States on digital download on August 29, 2017, and was first released physically in the United States on 4K Ultra HD Blu-ray, Blu-ray, and DVD by 20th Century Fox Home Entertainment (through DreamWorks Animation Home Entertainment) on September 12, 2017.

== Reception ==
=== Box office ===
Captain Underpants: The First Epic Movie grossed $73.9 million in the United States and Canada and $51.6 million in other territories, for a worldwide gross of $125.5 million, against a production budget of $38 million.

In North America, the film was released alongside Wonder Woman, and was projected to gross around $20 million from 3,434 theaters in its opening weekend. It made $8 million on its first day and $23.9 million in its opening weekend, finishing second at the box office, behind Wonder Woman ($103.3 million). The film grossed $12.2 million in its second weekend, $7.2 million in its third and $4.3 million in its fourth.

=== Critical response ===
On Rotten Tomatoes, the film has an approval rating of 87% based on 134 reviews and an average rating of 7/10. The site's critical consensus reads, "With a tidy plot, clean animation, and humor that fits its source material snugly, Captain Underpants: The First Epic Movie is entertainment that won't drive a wedge between family members." On Metacritic, the film has a score of 69 out of 100 based on 25 critics, indicating "generally favorable" reviews. Audiences polled by CinemaScore gave the film an average grade of "B+" on an A+ to F scale.

Matt Zoller Seitz of RogerEbert.com gave the film three-and-a-half out of four stars. Although Seitz pointed out that the film is hampered by "a rushed, jumbled quality" and has "tiresome" features that he says are common to DreamWorks, such as "frenetic action scenes ... and the use of workhorse pop songs", he emphasized that "[t]hey've approached this compendium of elemental slapstick and unabashed childishness with the reverence that the Coen brothers brought to No Country for Old Men." He further added that the inclusion of the flipbook interludes are the film's best parts, especially in having the pages accidentally be torn similar to the real books, stating that "[i]t's not often that a movie puts a spotlight on a mundane ritual in your own life that you never realized was profound and says, 'You probably forgot about this, but I want you to remember it and savor it because it meant something.'"

== Accolades ==
| Award | Category | Recipient(s) | Result |
|---|---|---|---|
| Annie Award | Best Animated Feature | Mireille Soria and Mark Swift | Nominated |
| Annie Award | Music in an Animated Feature Production | Theodore Shapiro | Nominated |
| Annie Award | Voice Acting in an Animated Feature Production | Nick Kroll | Nominated |
| Detroit Film Critics Society | Best Animated Film | Captain Underpants: The First Epic Movie | Nominated |
| Empire Awards | Best Animated Film | Captain Underpants: The First Epic Movie | Nominated |
| Golden Tomato Awards 2017 | Best Animated Film | Captain Underpants: The First Epic Movie | 5th Place |
| Hollywood Music in Media Awards 2017 | Best Original Song - Animated Film | "Captain Underpants Theme Song" for "Weird Al" Yankovic | Nominated |
| Hollywood Music in Media Awards 2017 | Best Original Score - Animated Film | Theodore Shapiro | Nominated |
| International Film Music Critics Association | Best Original Score - Animated Film | Theodore Shapiro | Won |
| IGN Awards | Best Animated Movie | Captain Underpants: The First Epic Movie | Nominated |
| Kids' Choice Awards | Favorite Animated Film | Captain Underpants: The First Epic Movie | Nominated |
| Los Angeles Online Film Critics Society | Best Animated Film | Captain Underpants: The First Epic Movie | Nominated |
| St. Louis Film Critics Association | Best Animated Feature | David Soren | Nominated |
| 16th Visual Effects Society Awards | Outstanding Visual Effects in an Animated Feature | David Soren, Mark Swift, Mireille Soria, David Dulac | Nominated |

== Spin-offs ==
=== Spin-off television series ===
On December 12, 2017, Netflix and DreamWorks Animation Television announced that there would be a spin-off animated series of film titled The Epic Tales of Captain Underpants, it was released on Netflix on July 13, 2018.

=== Spin-off film ===
On December 9, 2020, Universal Pictures and DreamWorks Animation announced that a feature film adaptation of Dog Man—another one of George and Harold's comic creations in-universe—was planned to be directed by Peter Hastings, the show runner for The Epic Tales of Captain Underpants, it was released by Universal Pictures on January 31, 2025.
