= Christopher Knights =

British actor

- Other name: Chris Knights
- Occupations: Voice actor; film editor; cinematographer
- Years active: 1993–present
- Employers: DreamWorks Animation (1998–present); Paramount Animation (2021–present)

Christopher Knights is a British voice actor. He is best known for providing the voice of Private the Penguin in the Madagascar film franchise. He worked on several DreamWorks films: Shrek, Shrek 2, Shrek the Third and Shrek 4-D. He started his filming career at Amblimation studios and worked on We're Back! A Dinosaur's Story and Balto. When he joined DreamWorks he not only started his editing career but also his acting career. He worked on the Shrek series as an associate editor and voice of the Three Blind Mice and Thelonious, Lord Farquaad's henchman. He worked many times with another British cameraman and voice actor, Simon J. Smith.

== Filmography ==
=== Actor ===
- Shrek 5 (2027) as Three Blind Mice (voice)
- Rumble (2021) as King Gorge's Coach (voice)
- Penguins of Madagascar (2014) as Private the Penguin (voice)
- Madly Madagascar (2013) as Private the Penguin (voice)
- Madagascar 3: Europe's Most Wanted (2012) as Private the Penguin (voice)
- Shrek Forever After (2010) as Three Blind Mice (voice)
- Merry Madagascar (2009) as Private the Penguin (voice)
- Madagascar: Escape 2 Africa (2008) Private the Penguin (voice) (credited as "Chris Knights")
- Shrek the Third (2007) as Blind Mice / Heckler / Evil Tree #2 / Guard #2 (voice)
- Flushed Away (2006) as Fat Barry the Rat / Market Trader (voice)
- The Madagascar Penguins in a Christmas Caper (2005) as Private the Penguin (voice) (credited as "Chris Knights")
- Madagascar (2005) as Private the Penguin / Pedistain (voice) (credited as "Chris Knights")
- Shrek 2 (2004) as Three Blind Mice (voice) (with Simon J. Smith)
- Shrek 3-D (2003) as Thelonious / Blind Mouse (voice) (with Simon J. Smith)
- Shrek (2001) Blind Mouse / Thelonious (voice) (with Simon J. Smith and Mike Myers)
- Shrek in the Swamp Karaoke Dance Party (2001) as Thelonious / Blind Mouse (singing voice) (with Simon J. Smith)

=== Editorial department ===
- Kung Fu Panda 4 (2024) (editor)
- Spirit Untamed (2021) (associate editor) (with C.K. Horness)
- Megamind (2010) (associate editor)
- Shrek Forever After (2010) (associate editor)
- Shrek the Third (2007) (associate editor)
- Madagascar (2005) (first assistant editor)
- Shrek 2 (2004) (assistant editor) (with Simon J. Smith)
- Shrek 4-D (2003) (additional editor) (with Simon J. Smith)
- Shrek (2001) (first assistant film editor) (with Simon J. Smith)

=== Camera and electrical department ===
- The Prince of Egypt (1998) (camera operator)
- Balto (1995) (camera operator: rostrum camera)
- We're Back! A Dinosaur's Story (1993) (camera operator: rostrum camera)

=== Animation department ===
- We're Back! A Dinosaur's Story (1993) (line tester as Chris Knights)
