= Madagascar 3: Europe's Most Wanted =

2012 animated comedy film by DreamWorks Animation

- Theatrical release poster
- Directed by: Eric Darnell; Conrad Vernon; Tom McGrath
- Written by: Eric Darnell; Noah Baumbach
- Produced by: Mireille Soria; Mark Swift
- Starring: Ben Stiller; Chris Rock; David Schwimmer; Jada Pinkett Smith; Sacha Baron Cohen; Cedric the Entertainer; Andy Richter; Tom McGrath; Jessica Chastain; Bryan Cranston; Martin Short; Frances McDormand
- Edited by: Nick Fletcher
- Music by: Hans Zimmer
- Production companies: DreamWorks Animation; PDI/DreamWorks
- Distributed by: Paramount Pictures (Note: In July 2014, the film's distribution rights were purchased by DreamWorks Animation from Paramount Pictures and transferred to 20th Century Fox before reverting to Universal Pictures in 2018 following NBCUniversal's acquisition of DreamWorks Animation in 2016.)
- Release dates: May 18, 2012 (Cannes); June 8, 2012 (United States)
- Running time: 93 minutes
- Country: United States
- Language: English
- Budget: $145 million
- Box office: $747 million

Madagascar 3: Europe's Most Wanted is a 2012 American animated comedy film directed by Eric Darnell, Conrad Vernon, and Tom McGrath, and written by Darnell and Noah Baumbach. It is the third installment in the Madagascar film series, a sequel to Madagascar: Escape 2 Africa (2008), it was produced by DreamWorks Animation. The film features Ben Stiller, Chris Rock, David Schwimmer, Jada Pinkett Smith, Sacha Baron Cohen, Cedric the Entertainer, Andy Richter, and McGrath reprising their roles from the previous films, with Jessica Chastain, Bryan Cranston, Martin Short, and Frances McDormand joining the cast. In the film, the main characters—a party of animals from the Central Park Zoo whose adventures have already taken them to Madagascar and mainland Africa—attempt to return to New York City and find themselves traveling across Europe with a circus while being chased by the villainous head of Monaco's animal control service.

DreamWorks Animation announced the third film in August 2008, three months before the release of the second film. As with the previous films in the franchise, the score was composed by Hans Zimmer.

Madagascar 3: Europe's Most Wanted premiered out of competition at the 2012 Cannes Film Festival on May 18, 2012, and was theatrically released in the United States on June 8 by Paramount Pictures. The film received generally positive reviews from critics, with praise going towards its animation, characters, voice acting and humor. It was the eighth highest-grossing film of 2012, with a gross of $747 million against a budget of $145 million. A spin-off, Penguins of Madagascar, was released in 2014.

== Plot ==
Some time after the penguins Skipper, Kowalski, Rico, and Private, along with chimpanzees Mason and Phil, left Africa for a honeymoon in Monte Carlo aboard their modified airplane, (Note: As depicted at the ending of Madagascar: Escape 2 Africa (2008)) Alex, Marty, Melman, Gloria, and lemurs King Julien, Mort, and Maurice set out to find them so they could all return to the Central Park Zoo in New York City. They eventually track the penguins and chimps to the Monte Carlo Casino, but when their cover is blown, chaos ensues, and they barely escape from Captain Chantel DuBois, Monaco’s relentless animal control chief, who is determined to add Alex’s head to her taxidermy collection.

After their plane crashes beyond repair, the animals catch a ride on a circus train. The Circus Zaragoza crew—New Zealand sea lion Stefano, jaguar Gia, and Siberian tiger Vitaly—are cautious around outsiders, so Alex convinces them they’re American circus performers. The troupe is set for shows in Rome and London, aiming to impress a promoter and score their first American tour. To blend in, the penguins buy the circus from its human ringmaster using the fortune they won in Monte Carlo.

In Rome, Alex begins to fall for Gia, while Julien falls for Sonya, a Eurasian brown bear performer. DuBois chases them through Vatican City but ends up in prison. When the Colosseum show flops, Stefano tells Alex the circus was once famous, with Vitaly as the star leaping through shrinking hoops—until a stunt went wrong, losing his passion and sending the circus into decline. While stopping in the Alps, Alex convinces the circus animals to create a thrilling new act to restore their former glory and impress the promoter. Marty and Stefano discover a love for being shot out of a cannon, while Melman and Gloria master dancing together on a tightrope. Gia persuades Alex to teach her the “Trapeze Americano,” and romance soon blossoms between them. Meanwhile, DuBois escapes from prison and resumes her pursuit.

In London, Vitaly fears another failure and considers quitting, but Alex reignites his passion. The show becomes a success, prompting the promoter to sign the circus. DuBois arrives with her henchmen, but the penguins foil her plan—until a document DuBois carried exposes the group’s true motives. Feeling betrayed, the circus animals expel the quartet. After Julien breaks up with Sonya, the zoo and circus animals part ways but meet again in Central Park. When they see their old home, the zoo animals realize their adventures have changed them, and they decide their true place is with the circus. Suddenly, DuBois ambushes them, but before she can harm Alex, the zoo staff arrive, mistakenly believing she is returning the missing animals. Julien returns to the circus with the news, reconciles with Sonya, and the circus animals decide to rescue their friends.

Alex’s group wakes up in their old enclosures, now surrounded by tall fences. DuBois receives praise from the zoo staff but rejects the reward money, instead attempting to kill Alex with a poison dart in public. The circus animals swiftly come to the quartet’s rescue, and together they defeat DuBois. Alex’s group officially joins the circus, finally finding where they belong, while the penguins ship DuBois and her henchmen off to Madagascar as retribution.

== Voice cast ==
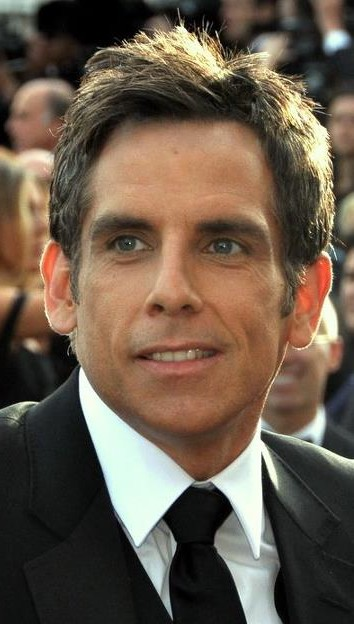
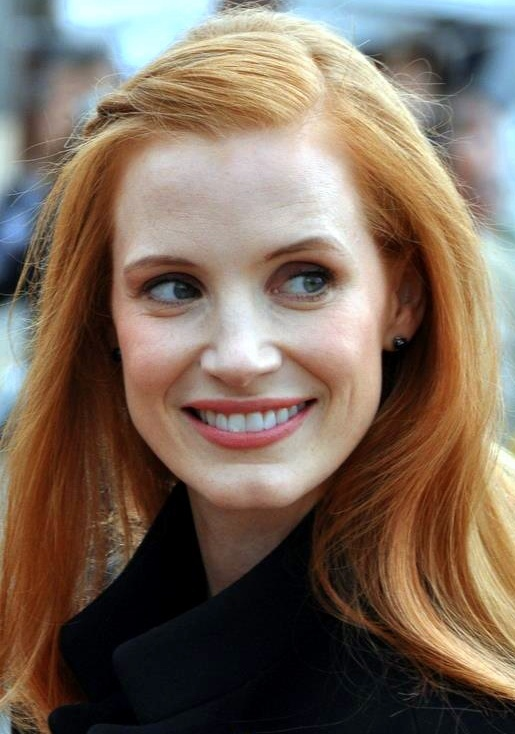
Ben Stiller and Jessica Chastain at the 2012 Cannes Film Festival, where the film had its worldwide premiere
- Ben Stiller as Alex, an African lion and the main protagonist
- Jessica Chastain as Gia, a jaguar and Alex's love interest
- Bryan Cranston as Vitaly, a traumatized Siberian tiger and ex-superstar of Circus Zaragoza
- Martin Short as Stefano, an Italian New Zealand sea lion and Vitaly's assistant
- Frances McDormand as Captain Chantel DuBois, the head of Monaco's animal control service who plots to capture Alex so she can add his head to her taxidermy collection. She is the main antagonist.
- Chris Rock as Marty, a plains zebra and Alex's best friend
- David Schwimmer as Melman, a reticulated giraffe, another of Alex's friends
- Jada Pinkett Smith as Gloria, a hippopotamus, another of Alex's friends
- Sacha Baron Cohen as King Julien XIII, a ring-tailed lemur who is the king of Madagascar
- Cedric the Entertainer as Maurice, an aye-aye who is the beleaguered assistant and royal adviser of King Julien
- Andy Richter as Mort, a Goodman's mouse lemur and King Julien's biggest fan
- Tom McGrath as Skipper, the leader of the penguins
  - McGrath also voices First Policeman.
- Chris Miller as Kowalski, Skipper's second-in-command and the most intelligent of the penguins
- Christopher Knights as Private, the English-accented, mild-mannered, and eager rookie of the penguins
- John DiMaggio as Rico, the mute loose cannon explosives expert and weapons supplier of the penguins
- Conrad Vernon as Mason, a refined British-accented chimpanzee
  - Vernon also voices Second Policeman.
- Frank Welker as the vocal effects of Sonya, an Eurasian brown bear and King Julien's love interest

== Production ==
DreamWorks Animation's CEO Jeffrey Katzenberg confirmed in 2008 that there would be an additional sequel to Madagascar and Madagascar: Escape 2 Africa. Katzenberg stated, "There is at least one more chapter. We ultimately want to see the characters make it back to New York." At the Television Critics Association press tour in January 2009, Katzenberg was asked if there would be a third film in the series. He replied, "Yes, we are making a Madagascar 3 now, and it will be out in the summer of 2012." On August 9, 2010, Katzenberg revealed in an e-mail that writer-director Noah Baumbach had done sixty pages of re-writes to the screenplay.

In January 2011, Frances McDormand was hired to provide the voice of the film's main antagonist, making this her first role in an animated film.

A significant amount of the animation and visual effects for the film had been done at DreamWorks Dedicated Unit, an India-based unit at Technicolor.

== Release ==
=== Theatrical ===
Madagascar 3: Europe's Most Wanted premiered out of competition at the Cannes Film Festival on May 18, 2012. The American release followed on June 8, 2012. The film was also converted to the IMAX format and shown in European territories.

=== Home media ===
Madagascar 3: Europe's Most Wanted was released on DVD, Blu-ray, and Blu-ray 3D on October 16, 2012, by Paramount Home Entertainment. It was the first DreamWorks Animation film to use the UltraViolet System and the Blu-ray and Blu-ray 3D comes with a rainbow wig. As of April 2014, 9.1 million home entertainment units were sold worldwide.

== Reception ==
=== Box office ===
Madagascar 3: Europe's Most Wanted earned $216 million in North America and $531 million in other territories for a worldwide total of $747 million. Its worldwide opening weekend totaled $137.6 million. Worldwide, it is the highest-grossing film in the series, the fourth-highest-grossing DreamWorks Animation film, the second-highest-grossing animated film of 2012, and the eighth-highest-grossing film of that year. Overall, it is the eleventh-highest-grossing animated film and the 113th-highest-grossing film of all time. The film took between 66 and 94 days of release, respectively, to out-gross its two predecessors. It surpassed Kung Fu Panda 2 to become DreamWorks' highest-grossing non-Shrek film, and their first non-Shrek film to gross over $700 million.

In North America, the film made $20.7 million on its opening day, which was higher than the opening-day grosses of the original film ($13.9 million) and its sequel ($17.6 million). For its opening weekend, the film ranked at the no. 1 spot, beating Prometheus, with $60.3 million, which was higher than the opening of the original Madagascar ($47.2 million) but was behind the opening weekend of Escape 2 Africa ($63.1 million). It remained at the top spot for two consecutive weekends. In North America, it is the highest-grossing film in the series, the sixth-highest-grossing DreamWorks Animation film, the second-highest-grossing 2012 animated film, and the tenth-highest-grossing film of 2012.

Outside North America, Europe's Most Wanted out-grossed Shrek Forever After to become DreamWorks Animation's highest-grossing film. On its opening weekend, it topped the box office with $77.3 million from 28 countries. It held that position for three consecutive weekends. Its three highest-grossing openings occurred in Russia and the CIS ($15.7 million), China ($10.4 million), and Brazil ($10.1 million in 5 days). It set an opening-day record for animated films in Russia with $3.7 million (since surpassed by Ice Age: Continental Drift) and became the highest-grossing animated film (surpassed by Ice Age: Continental Drift) and the third-highest-grossing film ever (at the time), earning $49.4 million. It also set an opening-weekend record for any film in Argentina with $3.80 million (first surpassed by Ice Age: Continental Drift) and it set opening-weekend records for animated films in Brazil, Venezuela, Trinidad, and the United Arab Emirates.

=== Critical reception ===
Based on 132 reviews, the film holds an approval rating of 78% on review aggregator Rotten Tomatoes and an average rating of 6.7/10. The site's critical consensus reads: "Dazzlingly colorful and frenetic, Madagascar 3 is silly enough for young kids, but boasts enough surprising smarts to engage parents along the way." This marks the best general review consensus of the film series that has showed improving critical favor; the original film has a score of 55%, and the sequel scores 64%. On Metacritic, it holds a score of 60 out of 100 based on 26 reviews, indicating "mixed or average" reviews. Audiences polled by CinemaScore gave the film an average grade of "A" on an A+ to F scale (an improvement over the first two film's "A−").

Lisa Kennedy of The Denver Post gave the film 3.5 out of 4 stars and said, "From time to time the improbable occurs: A sequel outdoes its original." Colin Covert of Star Tribune said that Madagascar 3 set a high standard for cartoon comedy and was almost too good for kids. He gave it 3.5 out of 4 stars. Giving the film 3.5 out of 5 stars, Betsy Sharkey of the Los Angeles Times said, "A neon-saturated, high-flying trapeze act with enough frenetic funny business that it's a wonder the folks behind this zillion-dollar franchise about zoo critters on the lam didn't send the animals to the circus sooner." Andy Webster of The New York Times said, "Where Madagascar 3 soars is in its visuals: A Monte Carlo chase is vertiginously madcap; a Cirque du Soleil-style spectacle dazzles with rich pastels; the 3-D effects have wit and invention. Kids will be stimulated. And, parents, you'll enjoy the sights." Stephen Witty of the Newark Star-Ledger calls the movie "fun and fast family entertainment. […] the animals' jazzy circus performance, done in black-light colors and set to a Katy Perry song—may be one of the trippiest scenes in a mainstream kiddie movie since Dumbo saw those pink elephants." Film scholar Timothy Laurie writes that the plot development of Madagascar 3 is "met with large servings of personal growth and side dishes of overcooked romance".

=== Accolades ===
Award	Category	Nominated	Result
ASCAP Award	Top Box Office Films	Hans Zimmer	Won
Teen Choice Awards	Movie Voice	Chris Rock	Nominated
Teen Choice Awards	Summer Movie: Comedy/Music	Madagascar 3	Nominated
Annie Awards	Animated Effects in an Animated Production	Jihyun Yoon	Nominated
Annie Awards	Character Design in an Animated Feature Production	Craig Kellman	Nominated
Annie Awards	Production Design in an Animated Feature Production	Kendal Cronkhite-Shaindlin, Shannon Jeffries, Lindsey Olivares, Kenard Pak	Nominated
Annie Awards	Storyboarding in an Animated Feature Production	Rob Koo	Nominated
Satellite Award	Motion Picture, Animated or Mixed Media	Madagascar 3	Nominated
Satellite Award	Best Original Song	"Love Always Comes as a Surprise" – Peter Asher & Dave Stewart	Nominated
Critics' Choice Movie Awards	Best Animated Feature	Eric Darnell, Tom McGrath and Conrad Vernon	Nominated
Kids' Choice Awards	Favorite Animated Movie	Madagascar 3	Nominated
Kids' Choice Awards	Favorite Voice from an Animated Movie	Ben Stiller	Nominated
Kids' Choice Awards	Favorite Voice from an Animated Movie	Chris Rock	Nominated

== Music ==
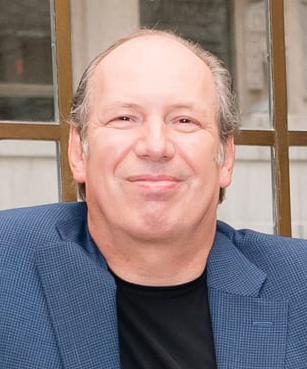
Hans Zimmer composed the film's score.

Madagascar 3: Europe's Most Wanted is the soundtrack of the film scored by Hans Zimmer and was released on June 5, 2012. "Afro Circus/I Like to Move It" peaked at 7 on the ARIA Hitseekers Singles chart on the week commencing October 15, 2012.

In some variations of the soundtrack, "Cool Jerk" is featured in place of "We No Speak Americano" by Yolanda Be Cool & DCUP. "Sexy and I Know It" by LMFAO was only used in the theatrical trailer, and was not included on the soundtrack and was replaced by "Firework" by Katy Perry for the circus. "Any Way You Want It" by Journey and the instrumental "Watermark" from the album of the same name by Enya were also used, but are not included on the soundtrack. "Land of Hope and Glory" by Edward Elgar appears in the track "Fur Power". The "Afro Circus" tune is from "Entrance of the Gladiators", by the Czech composer Julius Fučík.

== Video games ==
A video game based on the film, Madagascar 3: The Video Game, was released on June 5, 2012. The game allows gamers to play as Alex, Marty, Melman, and Gloria as they travel across Europe promoting the circus by performing stunts, circus acts and completing missions. It was released to PlayStation 3, Xbox 360, Wii, Nintendo 3DS, and Nintendo DS. Published by D3 Publisher in North America and Namco Bandai Games in Europe, the Wii, Xbox 360, and PlayStation 3 versions were developed by Vicious Cycle Software under the Monkey Bar Games label, and the 3DS and DS versions by Torus Games. The game received negative reviews from critics with Metacritic giving the Xbox 360 version a 45/100.

A mobile video game, Madagascar: Join the Circus!, also published by D3 Publisher, was released on June 4, 2012, for iPhone and iPad. The game allows players to build a circus and play mini-games. The game was removed from App Stores on June 16, 2017.

== Comic book ==
A comic book based on the film and titled Madagascar Digest Prequel: Long Live the King! was released on June 12, 2012, by Ape Entertainment.

== Future ==
=== Spin-off ===
A spin-off film titled Penguins of Madagascar, depicting the adventures of penguin characters following the events of Madagascar 3, was released on November 26, 2014.

=== Sequel ===
In June 2014, it was announced that Madagascar 4 would be released on May 18, 2018. However, in January 2015, the film was removed from the release schedule following a corporate restructuring of DreamWorks Animation and the corporate shutdown of Pacific Data Images. In April 2017, Tom McGrath stated "There are things in the works, nothing is announced yet, but I think they'll show their faces once more." In January 2026, McGrath stated that DreamWorks still wanted to make a fourth Madagascar film as long as they could find a good story to tell for one.
