= The Madagascar Penguins in a Christmas Caper =

2005 American short film

- Directed by: Gary Trousdale
- Written by: Michael Lachance
- Produced by: Teresa Cheng; Mark Swift
- Starring: Tom McGrath; Chris Miller; Christopher Knights; John DiMaggio; Elisa Gabrielli; Bill Fagerbakke
- Edited by: Clare de Chenu; Mark Sorensen
- Music by: James Dooley
- Production companies: DreamWorks Animation SKG; PDI/DreamWorks
- Distributed by: DreamWorks Pictures
- Release date: October 7, 2005; (with Wallace & Gromit: The Curse of the Were-Rabbit)
- Running time: 12 minutes
- Country: United States
- Language: English

The Madagascar Penguins in a Christmas Caper is a 2005 American animated Christmas comedy short film produced by DreamWorks Animation SKG and PDI/DreamWorks and distributed by DreamWorks Pictures. Directed by animation veteran Gary Trousdale, produced by Teresa Cheng and Mark Swift, and written by Michael Lachance, it stars the voice cast of Tom McGrath, Chris Miller, Christopher Knights, John DiMaggio, Elisa Gabrielli, and Bill Fagerbakke. Set before the events of the first Madagascar film, the 12-minute spin-off features the adventures of four penguins, sometimes known as the Madagascar Penguins, who live in the Central Park Zoo and are trained as spies. When Private is captured by Nana while on his quest to find a present for Ted during his absence, the other three penguins, Skipper, Kowalski, and Rico, must rescue Private from Nana's apartment, while making last-minute preparations for Christmas at the Central Park Zoo. The music in the short film is scored by James Dooley.

The Madagascar Penguins in a Christmas Caper premiered in theaters on October 7, 2005, along with the stop-motion film Wallace & Gromit: The Curse of the Were-Rabbit, and then became a bonus feature on the Madagascar DVD and VHS shortly afterwards on November 15.

== Plot ==
On Christmas Eve, at Central Park Zoo in New York City, the youngest penguin on the team, Private, is looking around the zoo using the periscope which is decorated as a snowman. While most of the animals seem happy, a polar bear named Ted is all alone. Private therefore decides that a present would cheer up Ted, though his fellow penguins do not share the same sentiment. Determined to find Ted's present, Private slips out of the zoo. While roaming the streets of Manhattan, he is captured by Nana who mistakes him for a chew toy for her vicious dog, Mr. Chew. The other three penguins, Skipper, Kowalski, and Rico, set out to rescue Private from Nana's apartment when they discover Private's absence (only when they were going over everything before eating). They escalate into chaos against Mr. Chew, all-the-while, not noticed by Nana, who is occupied watching a football game. When they are done, they stuff Mr. Chew into a stocking. Before leaving, Skipper lets Rico detonate the door with a stick of dynamite (which Rico had repeatedly attempted to use prior), finally attracting Nana's attention who ends up punishing Mr. Chew with a big time-out, thinking he was responsible for the damage the penguins had done to her apartment.

Returning to the Central Park Zoo, they invite Ted to their home, but Ted already had invited several other guests, resulting in a massive sing-a-long to a parody of Jingle Bells.

== Voice cast ==
- Tom McGrath as Skipper
- Chris Miller as Kowalski
- Christopher Knights as Private
- John DiMaggio as Rico
- Elisa Gabrielli as Nana (credited as The Old Lady)
- Bill Fagerbakke as Ted the polar bear
- Sean Bishop as The Doorman, and The TV Announcer

Additional voices include Hope Levy, Rif Hutton, Richard Miro, Mitch Carter, Ben Stiller, Chris Rock, David Schwimmer, Jada Pinkett-Smith and Lynnanne Zager

== Soundtrack ==
The original music for the short was composed by James Dooley. According to Dooley, he was asked to score because he "had written all the music for the penguins in the feature length, Madagascar."

No.	Title	Writer(s)	Length
8.	"He Looks So Bad"	Jim Dooley	0:42
9.	"Where's The Private?"	Jim Dooley	0:30
10.	"Analysis!"	Jim Dooley	0:41
11.	"I am Walking Here"	Jim Dooley	0:47
12.	"Good Boy"	Jim Dooley	1:24
13.	"Help Me Guys!"	Jim Dooley	0:26
14.	"Storking Stuffer Operation"	Jim Dooley	1:36
15.	"Bad Dog"	Jim Dooley	0:46
16.	"Jingle End"	Jim Dooley	0:11
17.	"Jingle, Jingle, Jingle - Brian Setzer"	Jim Dooley	1:49
Total length:			8:52

== Home media ==
The Madagascar Penguins in a Christmas Caper was released on later DVD editions of Madagascar, Shrek, and Shrek 2, all of which were released on November 15, 2005. It was released on Blu-ray on September 23, 2008, as a bonus feature attached to Madagascar.

== Legacy ==
The short would establish elements that would later reappear in The Penguins of Madagascar television series; it features the penguins' underground headquarters for the first time, and also established Rico's appearance and personality, compared to his ambiguity in the main Madagascar movies. Kowalski also uses an abacus for the first time, which would also be a reoccurring element in the show. Ted the polar bear would also reappear in the series but as a silent character, due to him being frequently cut off when he starts to talk.

== See also ==
- List of Christmas films
