= Mireille Soria =

Animated film producer

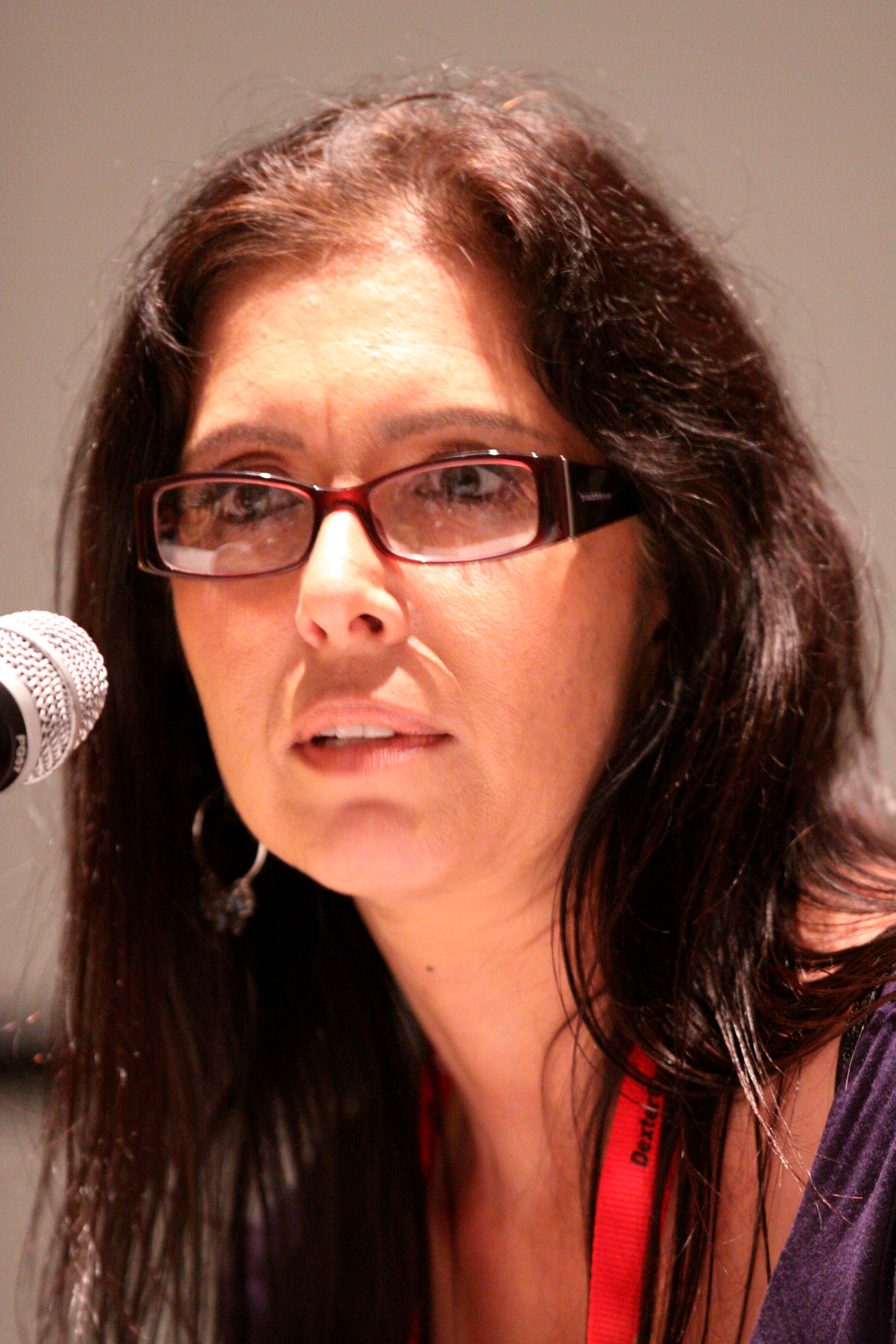
- Soria at San Diego Comic-Con in July 2010.
- Born: April 22, 1970 (age 56); Greenwich, Connecticut, U.S.
- Occupations: Film and TV producer
- Employer(s): DreamWorks Animation; Paramount Animation
- Notable work: Spirit: Stallion of the Cimarron, Sinbad: Legend of the Seven Seas, Madagascar (franchise), Neighbors from Hell; Home, Captain Underpants: The First Epic Movie

Mireille Soria (born April 22, 1970) is an American film producer, most notable for working at DreamWorks Animation on many of their films and for producing the animated sitcom Neighbors from Hell.

She produced Spirit: Stallion of the Cimarron, Sinbad: Legend of the Seven Seas, Madagascar and its sequels Madagascar: Escape 2 Africa and Madagascar 3: Europe's Most Wanted, Home, and Captain Underpants: The First Epic Movie.

After DreamWorks saw a series of financially disappointing films, DreamWorks Animation named Soria co-president of feature animation in early 2015. Along with Bonnie Arnold, she was tasked with overseeing the creative development and production of DWA's theatrical releases. However, in December 2016, Soria stepped down from her role as co-president of feature animation at DWA and returned to producing.

In July 2017, Soria was hired by Paramount to be the president of its animation division, Paramount Animation. She was replaced in that role by Ramsey Ann Naito in September 2021.

Mireille Soria filmography
Year	Film	Role	Notes
1989	Out on the Edge	co-executive producer	TV movie
1991	Victim of Love	executive producer	TV movie
1991	Vidiots	producer	TV movie
1997	Under Wraps	executive producer	TV movie
1998	Ever After: A Cinderella Story	producer	
2002	Spirit: Stallion of the Cimarron	producer	
2003	Sinbad: Legend of the Seven Seas	producer	
2005	Madagascar	producer	
2008	Madagascar: Escape 2 Africa	producer	
2010	Neighbors from Hell	executive producer	TV series
2012	Madagascar 3: Europe's Most Wanted	producer	
2014	Penguins of Madagascar	executive producer	
2015	Home	producer	
2017	Captain Underpants: The First Epic Movie	producer	
2021	My Little Pony: A New Generation	special thanks	
2023	Leo	producer	
