= Teresa Cheng =

American film producer

- Born: November 8, 1957 (age 68); Hong Kong
- Education: University of Washington, Seattle, Washington, United States
- Occupation: Animation producer
- Known for: Shrek Forever After; Madagascar; Batman & Robin; True Lies

Teresa Cheng (born November 8, 1957) is an animation producer specifically skilled in computer graphics and most famously known for her work on Shrek Forever After, Madagascar, Batman & Robin, and True Lies. She has worked with major agencies such as Warner Brothers Studios, DreamWorks, assumed the role of general manager for Lucasfilm Animation, and most recently has become chair of the John C. Hench Division of Animation and Digital Arts at the USC School of Cinematic Arts.

== Biography ==
Cheng was born in Hong Kong but moved to Seattle, Washington to attend University of Washington where she earned her Bachelor of Arts in communications in 1979. She landed her first job in Toronto with CBC Television, Canada's largest broadcasting network. There, she was introduced to computer graphics, and from that she got her next jobs as a commercial producer for both Digital Domain and Rhythm and Hues. At Digital Domain, Cheng moved from commercials to visual effects on feature films. She began her feature animation career with DreamWorks where she stayed for 17 years and held various positions as a producer and a studio executive.

More recently Cheng's professional roles have specialized in Asia. She has worked as the general manager for Industrial Light & Magic Singapore, a division of Lucasfilm, and had a collaborative role in DreamWorks U.S. and Oriental DreamWorks, which was just established in Shanghai in 2012.

Since the start of her career, Cheng has had 20 years of experience within both the film and commercial industry. One of her first contributions was her Rhythm and Hues work on the computer generated polar bears in the Coca-Cola commercials and since has worked on numerous well-known films and television series. Perhaps Cheng's most prestigious contribution is her work on Dreamwork's Shrek series, the 12th highest grossing franchise of all time and the highest grossing animated franchise. She is knowledgeable about the studio, facility, business, and global aspects of the animation industry. Cheng has occupied many leadership roles. At her first job at CBC, she started as promos producer and finished as the graphic design manager. At DreamWorks she occupied many positions such as production manager, head of production, and producer. She has been nominated in the VES awards for Outstanding Animation in an Animated Feature Motion Picture. In 2010, Teresa Cheng was included in the Producers Guild of America's Digital 25: Visionaries, Innovators and Producers list for her work on Shrek Forever After and was listed amongst names such as Steve Jobs and James Cameron. The Digital 25 list recognizes advances in Internet, interactive television, digital effects, gaming, and home entertainment.

== Filmography ==
- True Lies (1994): Digital Effects Producer
- Ace Ventura: When Nature Calls (1995): Digital Production Supervisor
- Batman Forever (1995): Digital Effects Producer
- Batman & Robin (1997): Visual Effects Production Supervisor
- Spirit: Stallion of the Cimarron (2002): Production Manager
- Shrek 2 (2004): Production Supervisor
- Madagascar (2005): Co-producer
- The Madagascar Penguins in a Christmas Caper (2005): Producer
- Shrek the Halls (2007): Producer
- Shrek Forever After (2010): Producer
- Hitman: Agent 47 (2015): Executive Producer
- Strange Magic (2015): Executive Producer
