= Elisa Gabrielli =

American actress

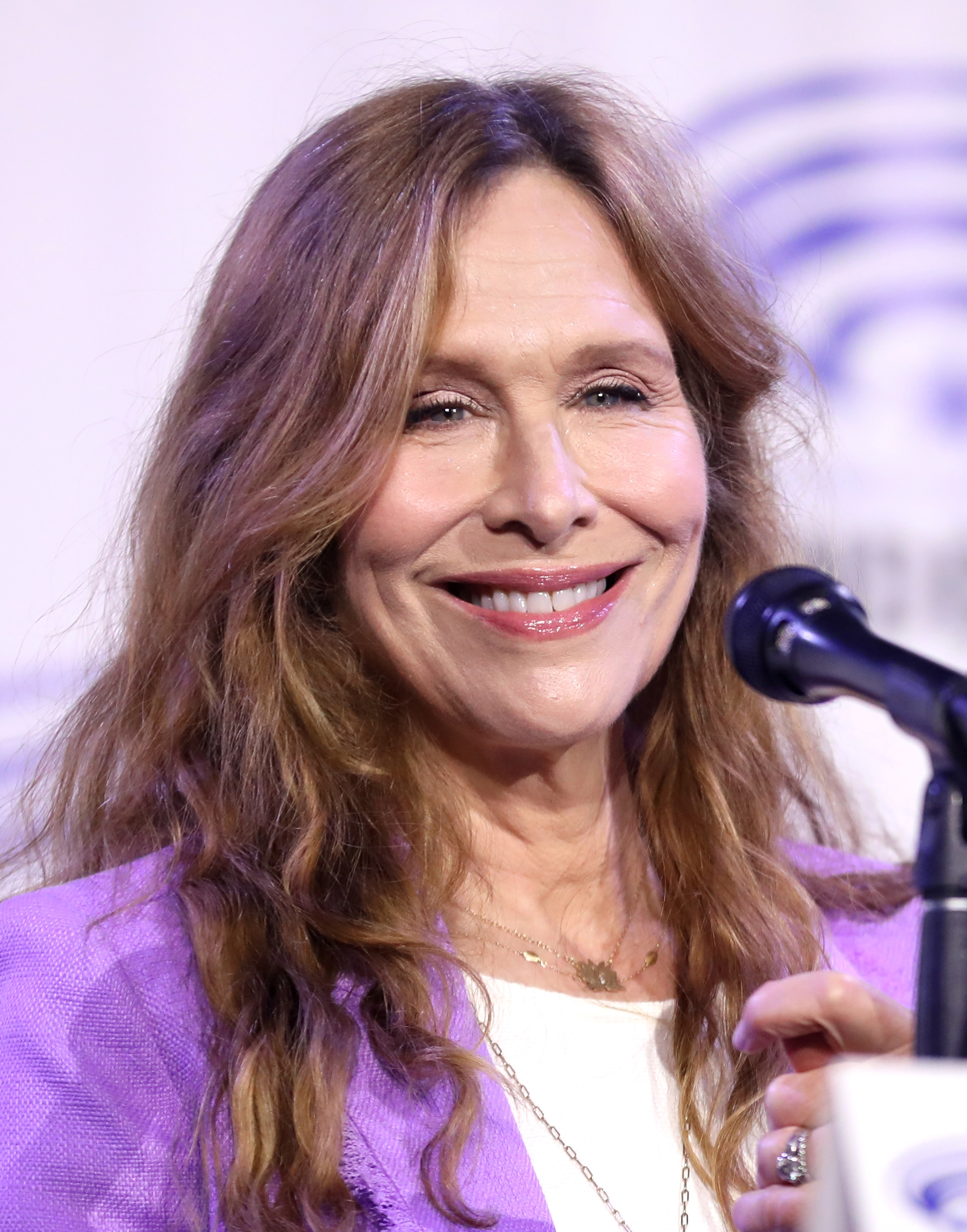
- Gabrielli at the 2024 WonderCon
- Other names: Diva West; Elisa Gabrella; Elise Gabriel; Elisa Pensler Gabrielli; Elisa Pensler; Elisa Pensler-Gabrielli; Julia Lynn
- Occupations: Actress; comedian
- Years active: 1988–present
- Spouse: Floyd VanBuskirk (?–present)
- Website: www.elisagabrielli.com

Elisa Gabrielli is an American actress and comedian, who played "Pepper" Potts in the animated movie The Invincible Iron Man, among other roles. Gabrielli also played the part of Miss Linley in The Brady Bunch Movie. In the 2005 animated film Madagascar, she was the voice of Nana, who became a breakout character that she voiced again in the 2008 sequel, Madagascar: Escape 2 Africa.

== Filmography ==
=== Live acting ===
==== Film ====
- Alien Space Avenger (1989) as Red Riding Hood
- Naked Gun 33 1/3: The Final Insult (1994) as Mourner
- The Brady Bunch Movie (1995) as Miss Lynley
- Waiting Game (1996) as Hattie
- Bubba and Ike (1998)
- Seven Girlfriends (1999) as Joan
- Luck of the Draw (2000) as Hit-Man's Woman
- Patching Cabbage (2003) as Fight Mother
- Father vs. Son (2010) as Beach Couple Wife

==== Television ====
- Eden (1993) as Celine
- Babylon 5 ("Mind War", 1994) as Guest Liaison
- Reform School Girl (1994) as Velmont Girl
- Murder One (1 episode, 1995) as Reporter
- Brooklyn South (1 episode, 1997) as Female Clown
- Jenny (1 episode, 1998) as Tammy
- ER (1 episode, 1998) as Inga Peterson
- G-Spot (1 episode, 2005) as Miramax Female Producer

=== Voice artist ===
==== Video games ====
Year	Title	Role	Notes
2002	Warcraft III: The Reign of Chaos	Tyrande Whisperwind	
2003	Warcraft III: The Frozen Throne	Tyrande Whisperwind	
2009	Eat Lead: The Return of Matt Hazard	Kitty Abundanza	
2009	The Sims 3	Sim	
2010	Fallout: New Vegas	Dead Horse Female	
2011	The Elder Scrolls V: Skyrim	Maven Black-Briar, Female Beggar voices	
2015	Heroes of the Storm	Tyrande Whisperwind	
2020	Twin Mirror	Bess, Christina	
2020	Warcraft III: Reforged	Tyrande Whisperwind, Sea Witch	

- Quest for Glory V: Dragon Fire (1998) as Nawar
- Robotech: Invasion (2004) as Maria
- Warcraft series (2002–present) as Tyrande Whisperwind

==== Film ====
Year	Title	Role	Notes
2003	Batman: Mystery of the Batwoman	Detective Sonia Alcana	
2005	Madagascar	Nana, Additional/Background Voices	
2006	The Invincible Iron Man	Virginia 'Pepper' Potts	
2008	Madagascar: Escape 2 Africa	Nana	
2013	A Turtle's Tale 2: Sammy's Escape from Paradise	Female patron	
2021	Luca	Concetta Aragosta	

- Mulan (1998) as Additional Voice
- Shrek (2001) as Additional Voices
- The Madagascar Penguins in a Christmas Caper (2005) as Old Lady/Nana
- Open Season (2006) as Additional Voices
- Beverly Hills Chihuahua (2008) as Elderly Chihuahua
- Open Season 2 (2008) as Additional Voices
- Bride Wars (2009) as Additional Voices
- Cyrus (2010) as Additional Voices
- From Up on Poppy Hill (2011, English dub) as Additional Voices
- Zootopia (2016) as Additional Voices (uncredited)

==== Television ====
- The Super Dave Superbowl of Knowledge (1994)
- 3×3 Eyes (1995)
- El Hazard: The Magnificent World (1995) as Queen Diva
- Gargoyles (2 episodes, 1995–1996) as Obsidiana, Maria Chavez
- Battle Athletes (1998) as Check-In Clerk, Upperclassman B, Operator A
- Dual! Parallel Trouble Adventure (2000) as Ayuko Rara
- The Legend of Black Heaven (2000) as Layla Yuki
- W.I.T.C.H. (1 episode, 2006) as Sarina Sanchez
- The Spectacular Spider-Man (2 episodes, 2008–2009) as Dr. Ashley Kafka
- Kung Fu Panda: The Paws of Destiny (season 2) as White Bone Demon

==== Additional Dialog Recording ====
- Son in Law (1993)
- Iron Will (1994)
- While You Were Sleeping (1995)
- That Old Feeling (1997)
- Romy and Michele's High School Reunion (1997)
- The Limey (1999)
- Diplomatic Siege (1999)
- Meet the Parents (2000)
- Winning London (2001)
- Shrek (2001)
- Monster's Ball (2001)
- The Challenge (2003)
- House of D (2004)
- Shopgirl (2005)
- Bobby (2006)
- Smart People (2008)
- The Experiment (2010)
- Aquaman (2018)

=== AudioBooks ===
Year	Title	Role
2015	Rain of the Ghosts	Iris Cacique
