= Madagascar (2005 film) =

2005 film by Eric Darnell and Tom McGrath

- Theatrical release poster
- Directed by: Eric Darnell; Tom McGrath
- Written by: Mark Burton; Billy Frolick; Eric Darnell; Tom McGrath
- Produced by: Mireille Soria
- Starring: Ben Stiller; Chris Rock; David Schwimmer; Jada Pinkett Smith; Sacha Baron Cohen; Cedric the Entertainer; Andy Richter
- Edited by: H. Lee Peterson
- Music by: Hans Zimmer
- Production companies: DreamWorks Animation; PDI/DreamWorks
- Distributed by: DreamWorks Pictures (Note: In July 2014, the film's distribution rights were purchased by DreamWorks Animation from Paramount Pictures (owners of the pre-2005 DreamWorks Pictures catalog) and transferred to 20th Century Fox before reverting to Universal Pictures in 2018 following NBCUniversal's acquisition of DreamWorks Animation in 2016.)
- Release date: May 27, 2005
- Running time: 85 minutes
- Country: United States
- Language: English
- Budget: $75 million
- Box office: $557.3 million

Madagascar is a 2005 American animated comedy film directed by Eric Darnell and Tom McGrath and written by Mark Burton, Billy Frolick, Darnell and McGrath. Produced by DreamWorks Animation and PDI/DreamWorks, the film stars the voices of Ben Stiller, Chris Rock, David Schwimmer and Jada Pinkett Smith as a quartet of anthropomorphic animals from the Central Park Zoo who find themselves stranded on the island of Madagascar and must adjust to living in the wild. Sacha Baron Cohen, Cedric the Entertainer, and Andy Richter also voice supporting roles. The film features a musical score by Hans Zimmer, and also features a cover version by Baron Cohen of "I Like to Move It" by Reel 2 Real, which has since become a recurring theme song throughout the franchise.

Madagascar was released in the United States by DreamWorks Pictures on May 27, 2005. The film received mixed reviews from critics, who praised the animation, voice acting and characters, but criticized the story and humor. It was a success at the box office, grossing $558 million on a production budget of $75 million, becoming the sixth highest-grossing film of 2005. The success of Madagascar launched a multimedia franchise, which includes two sequels, a spin-off film, several short films, television series and specials and a number of video games, theme park attractions and live stage shows.

== Plot ==
In New York City, a lion named Alex lives in the Central Park Zoo as a star attraction known as the "King of New York" with his best friends, a zebra named Marty, a giraffe named Melman, and a hippopotamus named Gloria. Marty, having grown tired of his daily life in the zoo, desires to experience the wild. One evening on Marty's tenth birthday, Alex, Melman and Gloria attempt to cheer him up, but he remains unsatisfied. Having learned earlier that the zoo's four Adélie penguin spies, Skipper, Kowalski, Rico and Private, are trying to escape to Antarctica, Marty decides to follow them out of the zoo to fulfill his wish to be in the wild.

Marty heads towards the Grand Central Terminal to catch a train to nearby Connecticut. Alex, Melman and Gloria discover Marty's absence and pursue him, joined by the penguins and chimpanzee duo Mason and Phil at Grand Central, where an army of officers subdue them. Under pressure from animal rights activists, the zoo is forced to ship the escaped animals by sea to a nature reserve in Kenya. During the trip, the penguins manage to escape their crate and hijack the ship, setting course to Antarctica, inadvertently causing the crates carrying Alex and his friends to fall overboard.

Upon being washed ashore on the East African island of Madagascar, the quartet come across its lemur inhabitants, led by a ring-tailed lemur named King Julien XIII. The predatory fossa attack the lemurs, but are scared off by Alex's fearsome appearance. Feeling homesick, Alex angrily blames Marty for the group's predicament, and makes several attempts to be rescued, with no success. Marty finds life in Madagascar to be exactly what he wanted, with Gloria and Melman soon joining him. Without the raw steaks Alex was provided at the Central Park Zoo, his hunger sets in, triggering his predatory instincts.

The next morning, King Julien and the lemurs attempt to befriend the castaways in hopes that Alex's presence will keep the fossa at bay, despite protest about Alex's predatory nature from his adviser, Maurice the aye-aye. While entertaining the lemurs, Alex starts to hallucinate everyone as steaks, briefly loses his sanity and attempts to eat them, scaring them all. Alex flees to the fossa territory of the island to protect his friends from himself. Seeing what Alex has become, and how dangerous the wild can be, Marty regrets his decision of leaving the zoo.

Having found Antarctica to be inhospitable, the penguins decide to land the ship at Madagascar. Seeing the chance to finally return home to New York City, Marty tracks Alex's trail towards the fossas' territory where he tries to convince his friend of the ship's arrival, but Alex refuses out of fear, still not wanting to hurt anyone. However, Marty refuses to leave without him too, and starts singing to cheer him up. When Marty is suddenly ambushed by the fossas, Gloria, Melman, and the penguins come to the rescue, but they are far outnumbered. Alex, having overcome his predatory instincts, arrives and rescues his friends, scaring the fossas away from the lemur territory permanently.

The penguins satisfy Alex's hunger by feeding him sushi, which he finds better than steak. As the lemurs throw a farewell celebration for the group, the penguins decide not to tell them that the ship has run out of fuel, leaving them stranded on the island for the time being.

== Voice cast ==
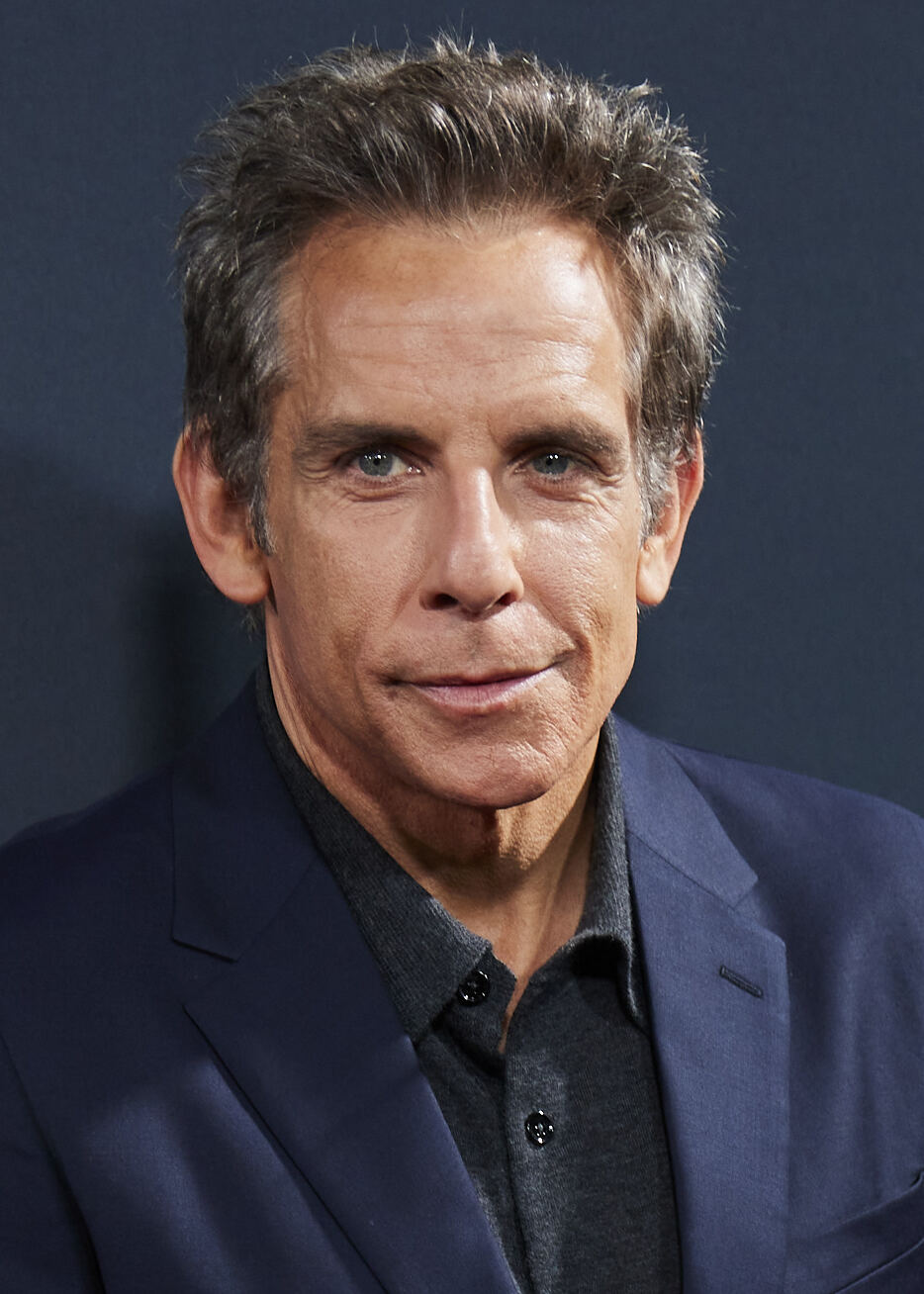
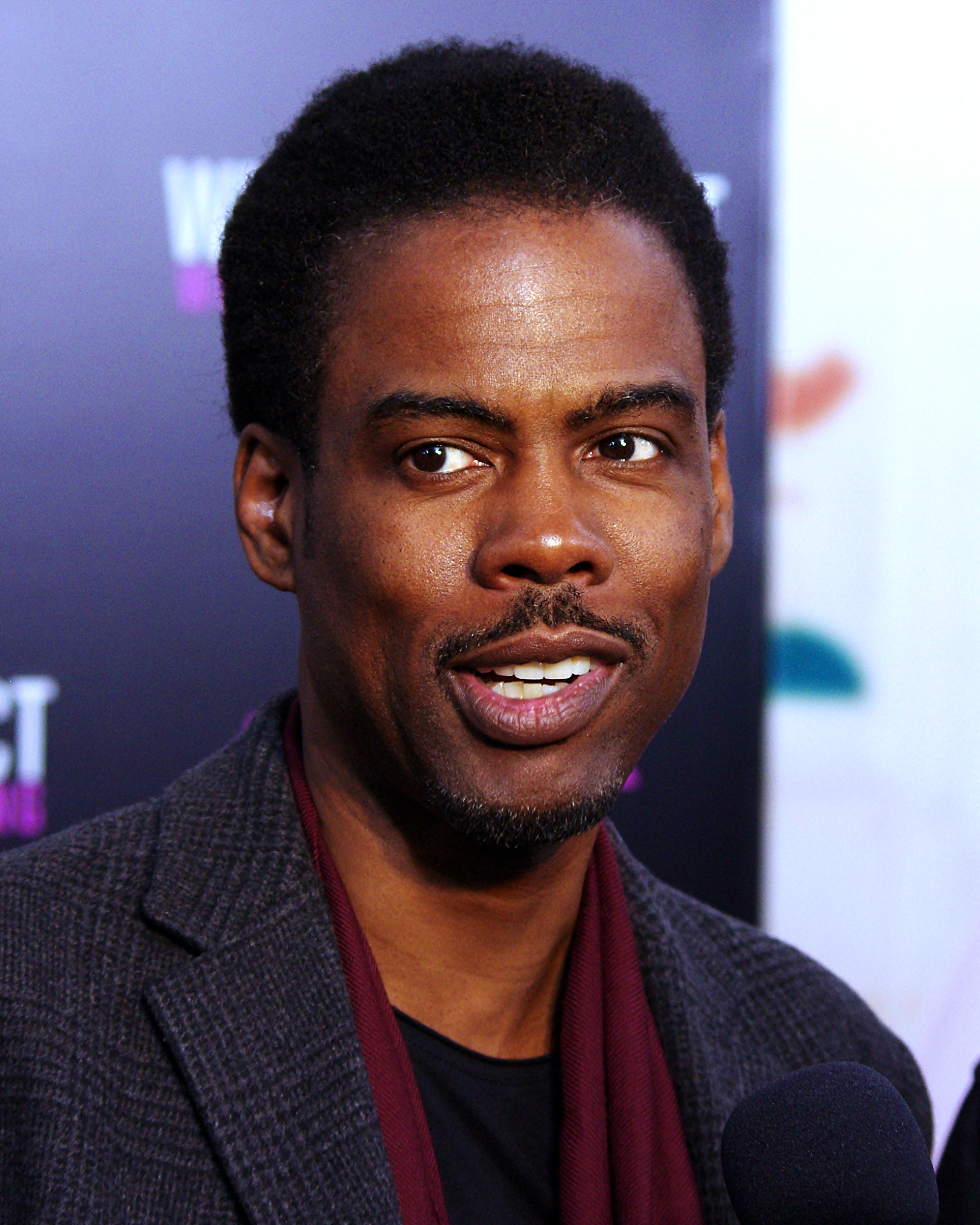
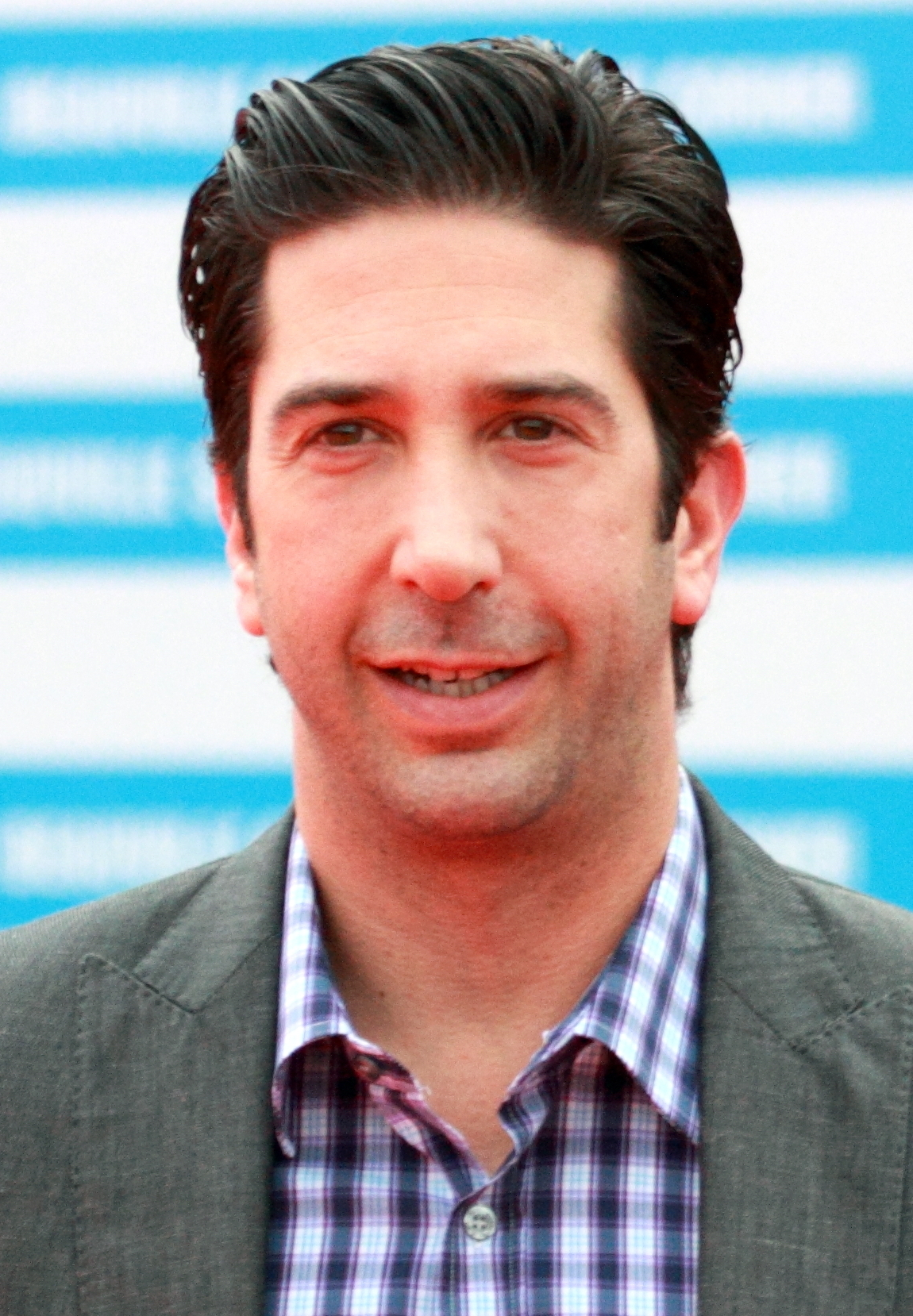
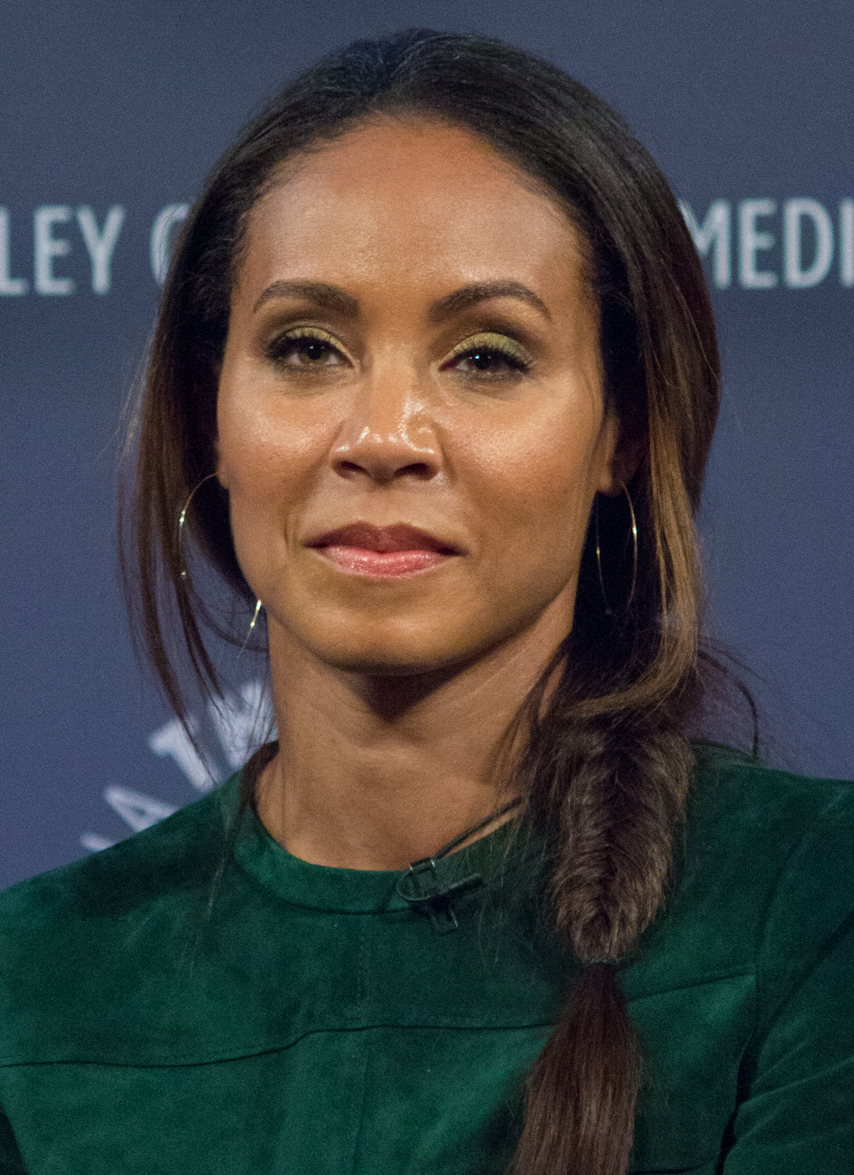
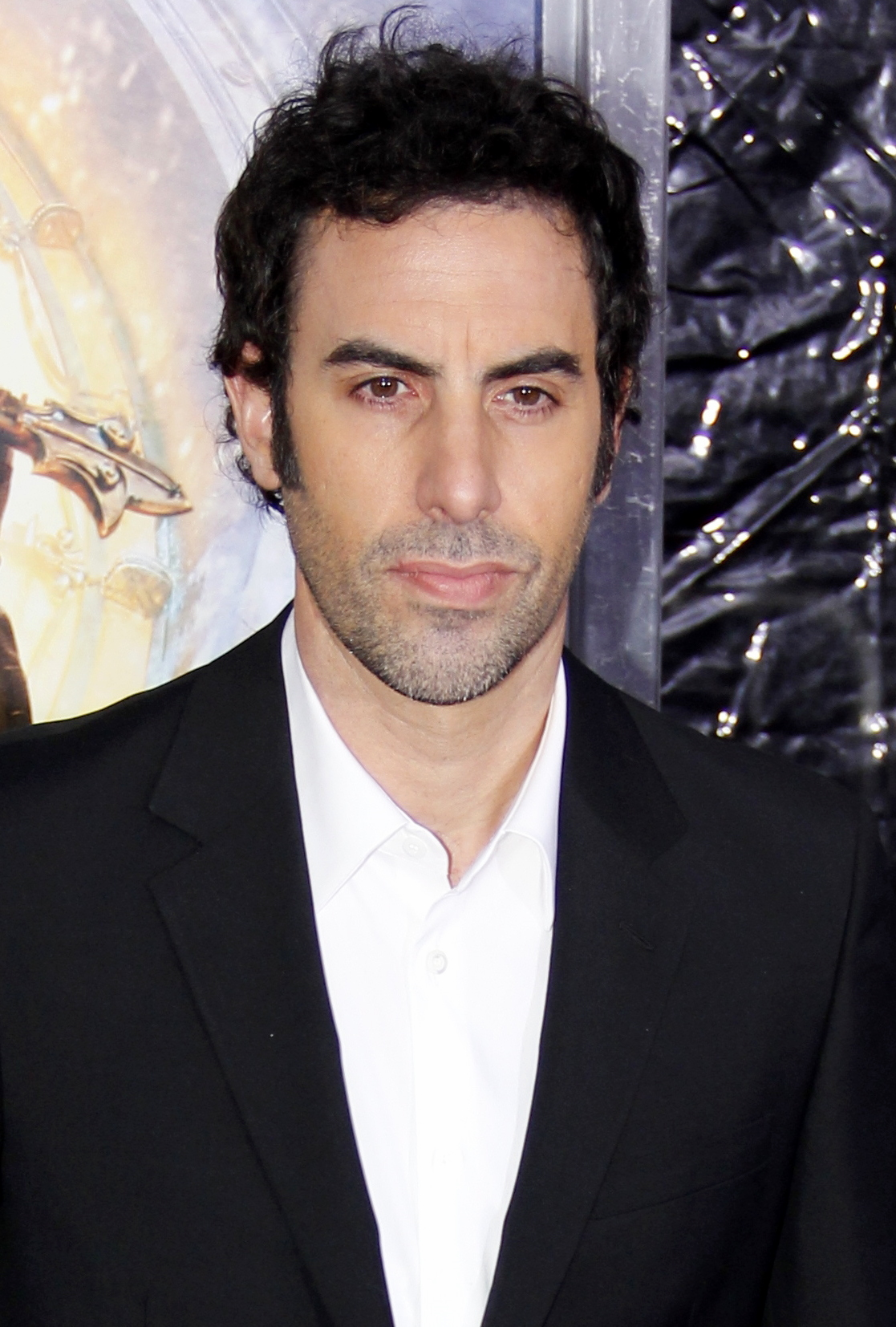
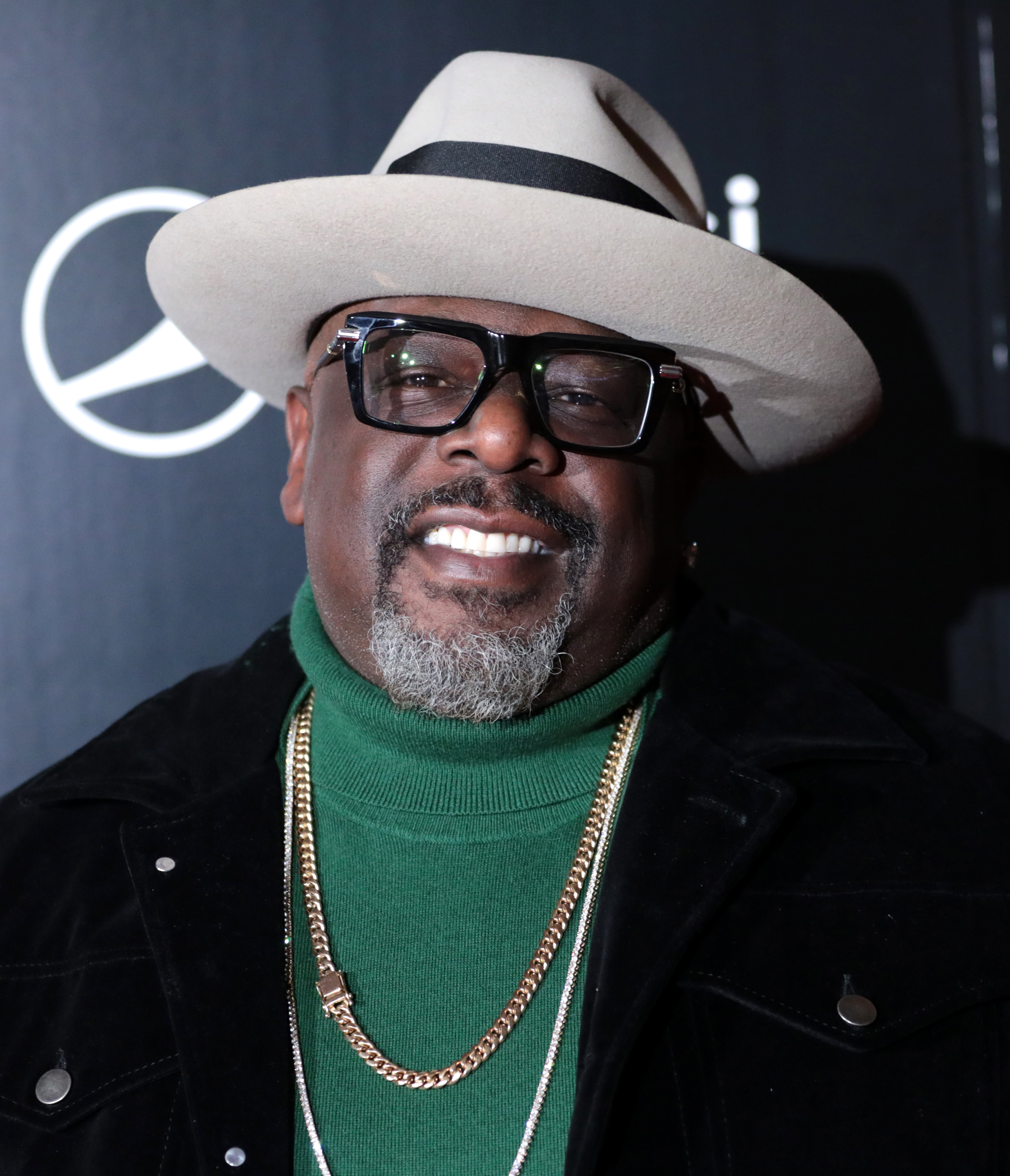
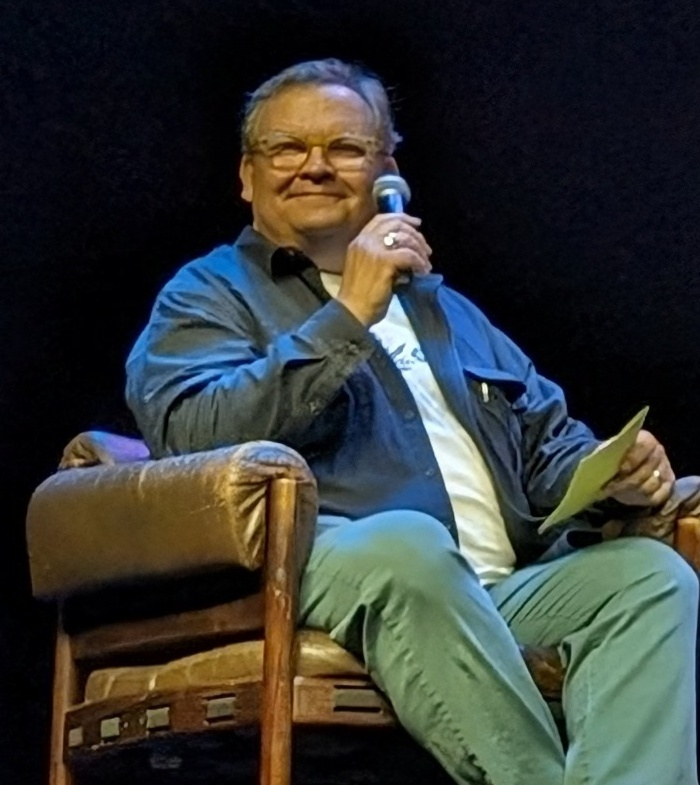
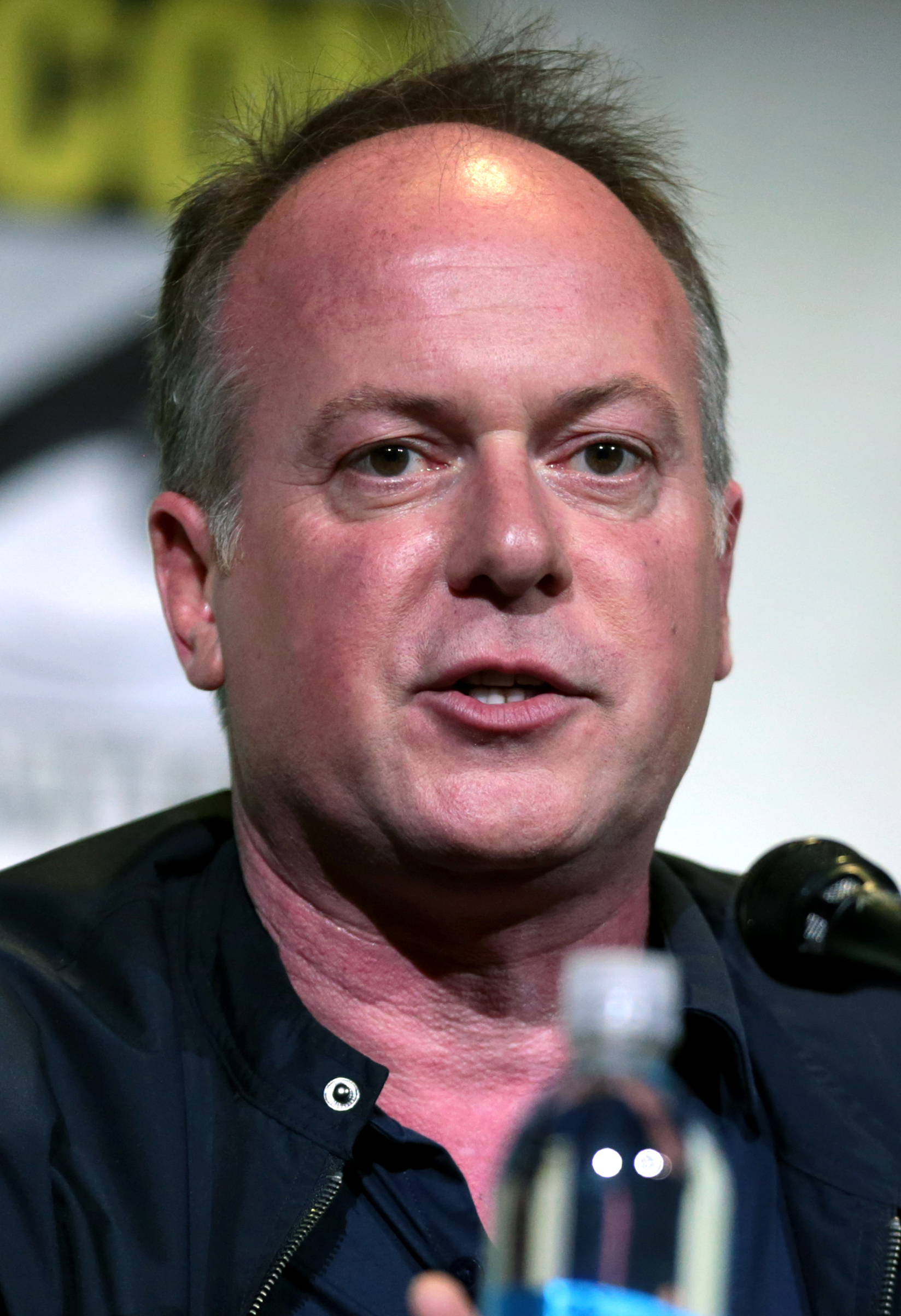
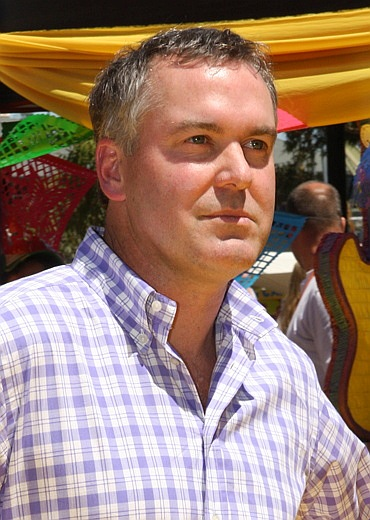
From top left: Main cast members Ben Stiller, Chris Rock, David Schwimmer, Jada Pinkett Smith, Sacha Baron Cohen, Cedric the Entertainer, Andy Richter, Tom McGrath and Chris Miller voices Alex, Marty, Melman, Gloria, King Julien XIII, Maurice, Mort, Skipper and Kowalski.
- Ben Stiller as Alex, an African lion and Marty's best friend. Tom McGrath explained that "Ben Stiller was the first actor we asked to perform, and we knew we wanted his character, Alex, to be a big performing lion with a vulnerable side."
- Chris Rock as Marty, a plains zebra and Alex's best friend. McGrath explained the character: "Marty is a guy who thinks there might be more to life than what's in the zoo. We wanted his character to be energetic, so we listened to Chris Rock."
- David Schwimmer as Melman, a hypochondriac, earnest, and awkward reticulated giraffe and one of Alex's friends who has germ phobias. When they were looking for a voice actor for Melman, they listened to Schwimmer's voice on Friends and, according to McGrath, thought that it "sounded really neat".
- Jada Pinkett Smith as Gloria, a sassy common hippopotamus who is one of Alex's friends. McGrath said that they found all these traits in Pinkett Smith's voice when they listened to her.
- Sacha Baron Cohen as King Julien XIII, a ring-tailed lemur and the leader of Madagascar's lemur community. King Julien was initially meant to be a "two-line" character until auditioning Baron Cohen improvised eight minutes of dialogue in an Indian accent.
- Cedric the Entertainer as Maurice, an aye-aye and King Julien's royal advisor.
- Andy Richter as Mort, a Goodman's mouse lemur who is King Julien's biggest fan and Maurice's best friend.
- Tom McGrath as Skipper, a penguin who leads a commando unit consisting of himself and three other penguins. McGrath, who also co-wrote and co-directed the film, initially lent his voice to the temporary tracks. Growing up with films starring tough actors like John Wayne, Charlton Heston, and Robert Stack, it was the latter of whom McGrath wanted for the voice of Skipper. Stack was approached about voicing the character, but died two weeks before production on the animation began. After that, DreamWorks Animation CEO Jeffrey Katzenberg decided to keep the temporary voice, with McGrath explaining: "People were used to me doing that voice. We knew it worked when we screened it." Many of the character's traits were based on Stack's work. McGrath especially emphasized The Untouchables, a 1959 television crime drama series starring Stack.
- Chris Miller as Kowalski, a penguin and Skipper's right-hand man and intelligence officer of the team.
- Jeffrey Katzenberg as Rico, a penguin who is the loose-cannon explosives expert and weapons supplier of Skipper's team who communicates through grunts and squeals. Mireille Soria, the film's producer, commented on Katzenberg's uncredited role: "The irony for us is that he's the one who doesn't talk. There's something very Dadaistic about that, isn't there?"
- Christopher Knights as Private, an English-accented penguin who is the mild-mannered eager rookie of Skipper's team. Knights was also an assistant editor on the film.
- Eric Darnell and Tom McGrath as the fossas.
- Elisa Gabrielli as Nana, an elderly Yiddish-accented New Yorker. Gabrielli provided some background voices until the directors and producer asked her and her fellow actors if they wanted to try their voices for the role. Upon seeing a black and white sketch of Nana, Gabrielli knew that she wanted to voice her. She modeled Nana's voice after her Russian and Hungarian grandmothers and her stepfather, though she did not think that her voice would be kept in the finished film at first.
- Bob Saget as Pal, a blue-and-yellow macaw.
- Conrad Vernon as Mason, a common chimpanzee (Phil, the other chimpanzee, is unvoiced, communicating to Mason via Sign Language. Phil is the one who can read whereas Mason cannot.)
- David Cowgill as a police horse.
- Stephen Apostolina as a police officer.

== Production ==
According to co-director Tom McGrath, the idea for Madagascar began as a one-sentence prompt, and it took two years of development for the idea to be refined to the point where the four main characters were finalized. In 1998, DreamWorks and PDI had started development on an animated film titled Rockumentary, which featured a Beatles-esque penguin rock band, and was to be directed by Eric Darnell, after he finished his work on Antz. The idea was scrapped in 2001, but after production on Madagascar started, Darnell decided to revive the penguins as a commando unit rather than a rock band.

"When Eric Darnell and I first met, he was working on Rockumentary, which was a spoof of A Hard Day's Night with four penguins: it had to be shelved because of problems with the music rights", McGrath commented. "When I was working on the storm at sea, Eric and I thought it would be funny if the penguins took over the ship and headed it for Antarctica. I was thinking S.W.A.T. with penguins, playing aggressiveness against their cuteness. As the film progressed, we used them to create a mirror story about animals trying to go back to where they think they belong."

=== Casting ===
Originally, Julien was intended to be a minor character with two lines. However, when Sacha Baron Cohen auditioned for the role, he improvised an Indian accent and eight minutes of dialogue for his recording. The filmmakers found Baron Cohen's performance so funny that they rewrote the script and made Julien a much more prominent character in the story as "King of the Lemurs". Dana Carvey was originally offered a role but he turned it down as he was busy raising kids at the time.

== Music ==
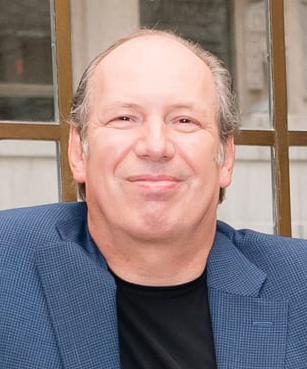
Hans Zimmer composed the film's score.

Madagascar (Motion Picture Soundtrack) is the soundtrack album featuring original score by Hans Zimmer and licensed and covered version of songs as featured in the film. It was released by DreamWorks Records, Geffen Records and UMG Soundtracks on May 24, 2005. Of particular critical note was the cover of "I Like to Move It" by Sacha Baron Cohen, which has since become a recurring theme song throughout the Madagascar franchise.

== Release ==
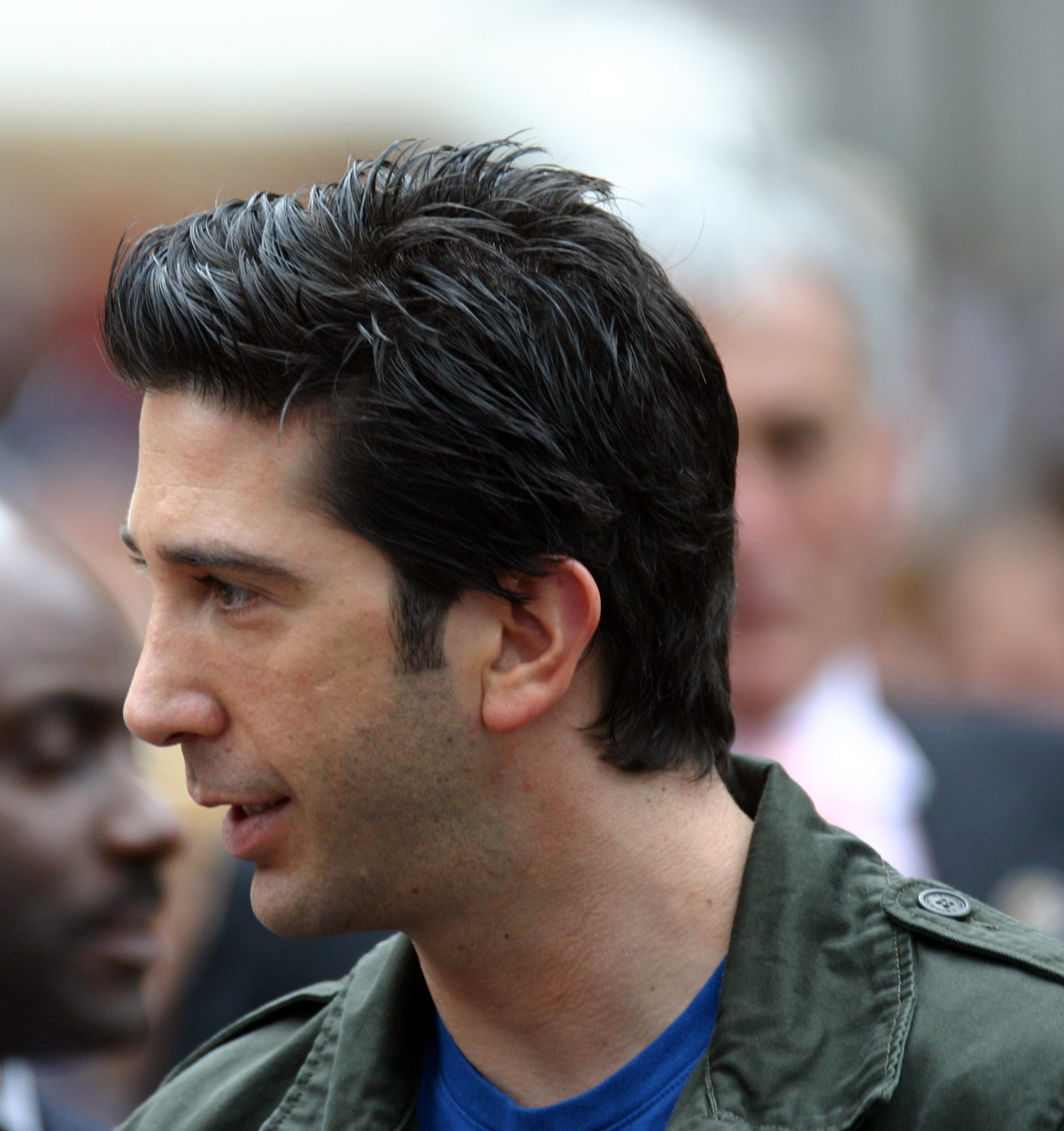
David Schwimmer at the film's British premiere in London

=== Theatrical ===
Madagascar had its original theatrical release in the United States by DreamWorks Pictures on May 27, 2005. In celebration of its twentieth anniversary, it was theatrically re-released in the United States by Universal Pictures on January 16, 2026.

=== Home media ===
Madagascar was released on VHS and DVD on November 15, 2005. The DVD included a short animated film The Madagascar Penguins in a Christmas Caper, and a music video "I Like to Move It", featuring characters from the film dancing to the song.

In February 2006, Paramount Pictures acquired the rights to all live-action films DreamWorks had released between 1997 and 2005, following Viacom's $1.6 billion acquisition of the company's live-action film assets and television assets. Additionally, Paramount signed a six-year distribution agreement for past and future DreamWorks Animation films, with DreamWorks Animation having spun off into a separate company from the live-action division in 2004. A Blu-ray version of the film was released by Paramount Home Entertainment on September 23, 2008, to coincide with the theatrical release of Madagascar: Escape 2 Africa. On August 16, 2010, Paramount released a 10-film box set titled the "DreamWorks Animation Ultimate Box Set", which included Madagascar, Madagascar: Escape 2 Africa, and eight other DreamWorks Animation films.

On December 31, 2012, DreamWorks Animation's distribution agreement with Paramount officially ended, and in July 2014, DreamWorks Animation announced they had reacquired the distribution rights to all of their films from Paramount, transferring these rights to their new distribution partner 20th Century Fox. On April 28, 2016, DreamWorks Animation was purchased by Comcast subsidiary NBCUniversal for $3.8 billion. On May 27, 2025, Universal Pictures Home Entertainment announced that the film would be released on Ultra HD Blu-ray on July 22, 2025, in commemoration of the film's 20th anniversary.

=== Book ===
The Madagascar - Movie Storybook was written by Billy Frolick and illustrated by Michael Koelsch, and was published by Scholastic in 2005. Koelsch also illustrated the Madagascar: Escape 2 Africa - Movie Storybook in 2008.

== Reception ==
=== Box office ===
The film was a commercial success. On its opening weekend, the film grossed $47,224,594 with a $11,431 average from 4,131 theaters making it the number 3 movie of that weekend behind Star Wars: Episode III – Revenge of the Sith and The Longest Yard. However, the film managed to claim the top position in the U.S. box office the following week with a gross of $28,110,235. In the United States, the film eventually grossed $194,304,665, and in foreign areas grossed $362,964,045 with a summative worldwide gross of $557,268,710. Overall, it was the sixth-highest-grossing film of 2005.

=== Critical reception ===
On Rotten Tomatoes, the film received a 56% approval rating based on 185 reviews, with an average rating of 6.2/10. The consensus reads: "Though its story is problematic in spots and its humor is hit-or-miss for the adult crowd, Madagascar boasts impressive visuals and enough spunky charm to keep children entertained." On Metacritic, the film has a score of 57 out of 100, based on 36 reviews, indicating "mixed or average" reviews. Audiences polled by CinemaScore gave the film an average grade of "A−" on an A+ to F scale.

Paul Arendt of BBC gave the film 4/5 stars, writing: "It's also a pleasure to see a cartoon so determinedly devoid of sentiment, a stance confirmed by the hilarious demise of an angelic little duckling. Highly recommended for kids and adults." Jeff Strickler of the Star Tribune gave the film 3/4 stars, describing it as a "good-natured kid flick" and writing: "This computer-animated comedy makes enough kowtows to adult humor that parents won't be bored, but it is clearly aimed at the peewee set." Ann Hornaday of The Washington Post described the film as "wildly fun" and wrote: "along with such recent classics as Shrek, Finding Nemo and The Incredibles, Madagascar will surely go on to take a deserved place on millions of families' video shelves as a reliable Saturday night staple." Kenneth Turan of the Los Angeles Times described the film as "a good-humored, pleasant confection that has all kinds of relaxed fun bringing computer-animated savvy to the old-fashioned world of Looney Tunes cartoons." Paul Clinton of CNN wrote that the film was "a delight", and added: "Co-writers and -directors McGrath and Eric Darnell, along with their entire team, have done a terrific job with their sweet and whimsical story."

Roger Ebert gave the film 2.5/4 stars, writing that it "is funny, especially at the beginning, and good-looking in a retro cartoon way", but added: "in a world where the stakes have been raised by Finding Nemo, Shrek and The Incredibles, it's a throwback to a more conventional kind of animated entertainment." Philippa Hawker of The Sydney Morning Herald also gave the film 2.5/4 stars, writing: "Madagascar, despite some break-out moments of silliness, seems defined by a formula that can't fail to please, at a basic level, but never feels imaginatively inspired." Rick Groen of The Globe and Mail gave the film 2/4 stars, describing the film's script as "a wafer-thin yarn that might have done Sylvester and Tweety proud, but goes missing-in-action when stretched over 80-plus minutes." A. O. Scott of The New York Times wrote that the film "arouses no sense of wonder, except insofar as you wonder, as you watch it, how so much talent, technical skill and money could add up to so little."

=== Awards ===
The film has won three awards and several nominations.

Award	Category	Recipient	Result
AFI's 10 Top 10	Animated Film	Madagascar	Nominated
Annie Award	Best Animated Feature	Mireille Soria	Nominated
Annie Award	Animated Effects	Matt Baer	Nominated
Annie Award	Animated Effects	Rick Glumac	Nominated
Annie Award	Animated Effects	Martin Usiak	Nominated
Annie Award	Character Design in an Animated Feature Production	Craig Kellman	Nominated
Annie Award	Music in an Animated Feature Production	Hans Zimmer	Nominated
Annie Award	Production Design in an Animated Feature Production	Yoriko Ito	Nominated
Annie Award	Storyboarding in an Animated Feature Production	Tom McGrath	Nominated
Annie Award	Storyboarding in an Animated Feature Production	Catherine Yuh Rader	Nominated
Golden Eagle Award	Best Foreign Language Film	Madagascar	Nominated
Kids' Choice Awards	Favorite Animated Movie	Madagascar	Won

In 2008, the American Film Institute nominated the film for its Top 10 Animation Films list.

== Franchise ==
The film became a franchise with two sequels: Madagascar: Escape 2 Africa, released in 2008, and Madagascar 3: Europe's Most Wanted, released in 2012 — both of which were more positively received.

A spin-off series entitled The Penguins of Madagascar premiered on Nickelodeon in 2008. The spin-off was made into the film Penguins of Madagascar in 2014. A prequel series entitled All Hail King Julien premiered on Netflix in 2014.

Another series entitled Madagascar: A Little Wild premiered on Hulu and Peacock in 2020. Madagascar has also spawned a number of short films, video games, and other media, as well as theme park attractions and live stage shows.
