= Penguins of Madagascar =

2014 DreamWorks Animation film

- Theatrical release poster
- Directed by: Eric Darnell; Simon J. Smith
- Screenplay by: Michael Colton; John Aboud; Brandon Sawyer
- Story by: Alan Schoolcraft; Brent Simons; Michael Colton; John Aboud
- Produced by: Lara Breay; Mark Swift
- Starring: Tom McGrath; Chris Miller; Christopher Knights; Conrad Vernon; Benedict Cumberbatch; Ken Jeong; Annet Mahendru; Peter Stormare; John Malkovich
- Edited by: Nick Kenway
- Music by: Lorne Balfe
- Production companies: DreamWorks Animation; Pacific Data Images
- Distributed by: 20th Century Fox (Note: In 2018, the film's distribution rights were transferred from 20th Century Fox to Universal Pictures, following NBCUniversal's acquisition of DreamWorks Animation in 2016.)
- Release dates: November 8, 2014 (Cork); November 26, 2014 (United States)
- Running time: 92 minutes
- Country: United States
- Language: English
- Budget: $132 million
- Box office: $374 million

Penguins of Madagascar (Note: Billed as DreamWorks Penguins of Madagascar) is a 2014 American animated comedy film directed by Eric Darnell and Simon J. Smith and written by Michael Colton, John Aboud, and Brandon Sawyer. A spin-off of the Madagascar film series and the fourth installment thereof, it was produced by DreamWorks Animation. The film features the voices of Tom McGrath, Chris Miller, Christopher Knights, Conrad Vernon, Benedict Cumberbatch, Ken Jeong, Annet Mahendru, Peter Stormare and John Malkovich. It takes place after the events of Madagascar 3: Europe's Most Wanted (2012) and follows the Penguins (McGrath, Miller, Knights, Vernon) who become entangled in a conspiracy involving a nefarious octopus scientist (Malkovich) with a grudge against them. The score was composed by Lorne Balfe.

Penguins of Madagascar was released theatrically in the United States on November 26, 2014, by 20th Century Fox. The film received generally positive reviews from critics. It grossed $374 million on a $132 million budget, underperforming by DreamWorks' standards, and was a box-office disappointment. Along with Mr. Peabody & Sherman earlier that year, it lost the studio $57 million. It was the last feature film to be produced by Pacific Data Images before its closure on January 22, 2015.

== Plot ==
In Antarctica, penguin chicks Skipper, Rico, and Kowalski rescue an egg from leopard seals on an abandoned whaling ship and are sent on an iceberg. When the egg hatches, the trio adopt the chick as their brother, Private.

Ten years later, Circus Zaragoza is continuing their American tour in Kentucky. (Note: As depicted in Madagascar 3: Europe's Most Wanted (2012)) The penguins leave to celebrate Private's birthday by breaking into Fort Knox to get Cheesy Dibbles from a vending machine, despite Private's wish of being recognized as a meaningful and valued team member. The penguins are subsequently kidnapped and taken to a submarine in Venice, where they meet Dave, a Giant Pacific octopus who was once an attraction at the Central Park Zoo until they upstaged him when they arrived. (Note: As depicted in Madagascar (2005)) After being repeatedly transferred between numerous zoos and aquariums around the world, continuously upstaged by penguins, Dave disguised himself as a human scientist named Dr. Octavius Brine to enact his revenge. Rico swallows a vial of Dave's snow globe collection from every zoo and aquarium that he was transferred to and his chemical, the Medusa Serum before the penguins escape.

Fleeing through Venice while pursued by Dave's octopus henchmen, the penguins are rescued by the North Wind, an inter-species intelligence agency consisting of a Eurasian wolf leader whose name is classified (Skipper calls him "Classified"), polar bear muscle Corporal, harp seal demolitionist Short Fuse, and snowy owl intelligence analyst Eva. The penguins show the North Wind the Medusa Serum, but Dave calls to reveal he actually has much more serum. The North Wind gets alerts of Dave kidnapping captive penguins around the world. Deeming Skipper's team a liability to the mission, Classified tranquilizes them and puts them on a plane bound for a North Wind safe house in Madagascar.

The penguins escape the plane, and, using Dave's snow globes, realize Dave targets every zoo and aquarium he was kicked out of, with the Shanghai Zoo as his next target. The penguins forms a plan to stop Dave, and Private reluctantly agrees to be the bait. They manage to trap Dave with a dinosaur skeleton just as the North Wind shows up. Dave escapes through a drain and captures the Shanghai penguins along with Private. Skipper, Rico, and Kowalski hijack the North Wind's jet to pursue him. At Dave's lair, Private learns that Dave plans to use the Medusa Serum to turn the penguins into monsters for the public to hate and exterminate.

Upon reaching Dave's hideout, the penguins and the North Wind clash over their different plans to infiltrate the submarine, before Skipper relents and goes with the North Wind's plan. The penguins distract the octopus guards while the North Wind sneak inside, but both teams are captured. Dave tests the Medusa Serum on Private, but he escapes using a paper clip he swallowed earlier, unbeknownst to everyone present, who believe Private has been vaporized. Private finds and frees the North Wind, but they refuse to help without their equipment, so Private goes alone.

As Dr. Brine, Dave unleashes the mutated penguins on New York City. Private obtains Dave's ray, finds Skipper, Rico, and Kowalski, and restores their sanity. As the penguins and the North Wind battle Dave and his henchmen, Private inserts himself into Dave's ray, using the power of his cuteness to restore the other penguins. This causes Private to gain a magenta purple hue, as well as spots and antlers, and Dave is now shrunken and trapped inside one of his snow globes, which Skipper gives to a little girl. Skipper deems Private the most meaningful and valued member of the team, to the approval of the North Wind, who give the penguins jetpacks.

Later, the penguins return to the circus and use Dave's machine to return Private to normal, using Mort as the power source. It works and Mort remains the same, outwardly, but is able to devour King Julien in one gulp.

== Voice cast ==
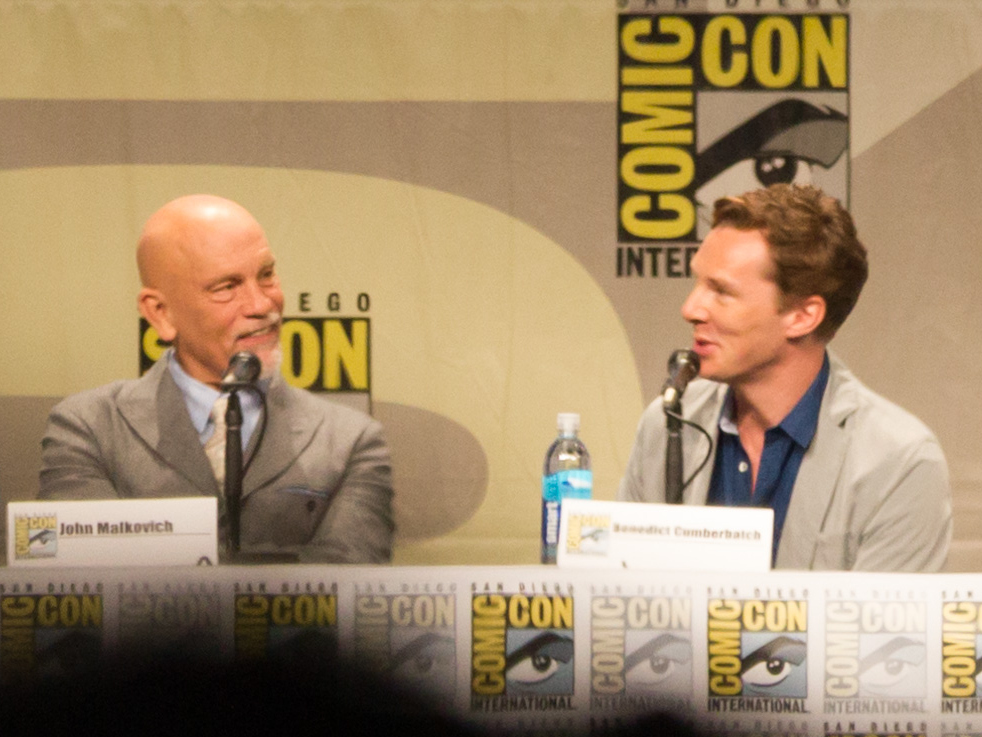
John Malkovich and Benedict Cumberbatch talking at the Penguins of Madagascar panel at the 2014 San Diego Comic-Con

- Tom McGrath as Skipper, the leader of the Adélie penguins.
- Christopher Knights as Private, the mild-mannered eager rookie of the Adélie penguins.
- Chris Miller as Kowalski, the dedicated status reporter.
- Conrad Vernon as Rico, the "special" penguin in the group that is obsessed with big booms. Vernon replaces John DiMaggio as the voice of Rico in the film.
- John Malkovich as Dave / Dr. Octavius Brine, a villainous and disgruntled giant Pacific octopus who has a human scientist disguise and has a one-sided grudge against penguins. He wants revenge on all penguins across Earth for being upstaged by them at international zoos.
- Benedict Cumberbatch as Agent Classified, a Eurasian wolf and the North Wind's team leader. Classified is not his real name, but a nickname Skipper gives him when former tells the latter that his name is classified information (and his real name is never revealed during the movie).
- Ken Jeong as Short Fuse, a Belgian white-furred harp seal and a member of the North Wind who serves as their expert in pyrotechnics and demolitions.
- Annet Mahendru as Eva, a Russian snowy owl with a matching accent, Kowalski's love interest/girlfriend, and the North Wind's intelligence analyst.
- Peter Stormare as Corporal, a Norwegian polar bear and a member of the North Wind who serves as the muscle.
- Andy Richter as Mort, a Goodman's mouse lemur and King Julien's biggest fan.
- Danny Jacobs as King Julien XIII, a ring-tailed lemur who is the king of Madagascar. Jacobs reprises his role from The Penguins of Madagascar and replaces Sacha Baron Cohen from the films.
- Werner Herzog as Himself (credited as the "Documentary Filmmaker")
- Billy Eichner as a New York City newsreporter

== Production ==
A direct-to-video spin-off feature film featuring the Madagascar penguin characters had been in the works since 2005, when the first film was released, with a release date initially planned for 2009. Years later, DreamWorks Animation announced in March 2011 that the penguins would be given their own theatrical film, directed by Simon J. Smith (the co-director of DreamWorks' Bee Movie) produced by Lara Breay, and written by Alan J. Schoolcraft and Brent Simons (the writers of DreamWorks' Megamind). Around this time, DreamWorks was actively expanding the Madagascar franchise as part of a broader strategy to develop its most recognizable properties into standalone features.

At the July 2012 Comic-Con, DreamWorks Animation announced that the film, then titled The Penguins of Madagascar, would be released in 2015. Bob Schooley, one of the developers of The Penguins of Madagascar series on Nickelodeon, said that the film would be unrelated to the eponymous TV series, but added that could always change. In early September 2012, 20th Century Fox—the studio's then new distributor—and DreamWorks Animation announced the film's release date of March 27, 2015 and a new team of screenwriters for the film, Michael Colton and John Aboud. Benedict Cumberbatch and John Malkovich joined the cast in August 2013. Cumberbatch, cast as the wolf team leader Agent Classified, reportedly underwent vocal coaching to refine an American accent for the role. Malkovich, who had been offered the role of Dr. Octavius Brine three and a half years before the film's release, told an audience at the July 2014 Comic-Con that he thought that it "was a funny idea" to use his voice for an octopus.

The production employed a different animation pipeline from the Madagascar trilogy. Although the characters originated in CG animation, the team aimed for a more stylized, dynamic tone to match the film's espionage-parody narrative. Smith stated that visual pacing and comic timing were influenced by classic spy films and slapstick animation. Unlike the TV series, which was produced in partnership with Nickelodeon, the film's animation was done primarily at PDI/DreamWorks in Redwood City, California.

This is the final DreamWorks Animation film to be produced by PDI/DreamWorks before its closure on January 22, 2015, with DreamWorks Animation (DWA) Glendale taking over until 2024, when the studio decided to shift away from fully animating its film in-house and rely more on outsourcing from outside studios.

== Music ==
On January 8, 2014, Lorne Balfe was announced to compose the film's musical score, making it his first solo score for a DreamWorks Animation film. Balfe wrote the additional music for the previous two Madagascar films and helped Madagascar composer Hans Zimmer with the score for Megamind. The soundtrack album was released digitally on November 21, 2014, and through CDs on December 5, by Relativity Music Group. Relativity also released an extended play, Penguins of Madagascar: Black & White Christmas Album, which featured five holiday songs. Pitbull performed a non-album single titled "Celebrate" for the film, which was played during the film's end credits and released as a part of his eighth studio album Globalization.

== Release ==
=== Theatrical ===
Penguins of Madagascar was originally scheduled to be released by 20th Century Fox on March 27, 2015. In May 2014, the film's release date was moved up to November 26, 2014, from its initial March 27, 2015 date, switching places with DreamWorks Animation's other film Home. Jeffrey Katzenberg, DreamWorks Animation's CEO, explained that the film, coming from one of DWA's most successful franchises, would have an easier task to stand out around the Thanksgiving holiday season while Home was to try taking advantage of a less competitive spring release window and repeat successful spring launches of some of DWA's original films, such as The Croods and How to Train Your Dragon. The film was released two weeks earlier in China on November 14, 2014, where it was released by Oriental DreamWorks. The film premiered at the Cork International Film Festival on November 8.

A four-issue comic book series based on the film was published by Titan Comics, written by Alex Matthews and drawn by Lucas Fereyra.

=== Home media ===
Penguins of Madagascar was released on DVD, Blu-ray, and Blu-ray 3D on March 17, 2015. It topped the home video sales chart in its first week.

== Reception ==
=== Box office ===
Penguins of Madagascar grossed $83.4 million in North America and $290 million in other territories for a worldwide total of $374 million. The film's production budget was $132 million, which, according to DreamWorks Animation's president Ann Dally, excluded "incentive-based compensation." By the end of 2014, the studio had to take a $57.1 million write-down, primarily related to the performances of the film and Mr. Peabody & Sherman. It marked the fourth film in three years that DreamWorks Animation lost money on, after Turbo and Rise of the Guardians.

In the United States and Canada, Penguins of Madagascar was released alongside Horrible Bosses 2, and was projected to $45–47 million from 3,764 theatres over its five-day opening weekend. It earned $6.25 million on its opening day and $3.95 million the next day on Thanksgiving Day. Wall Street analysts viewed the debut as significantly below expectations. Stifel Nicolaus analyst Benjamin Mogil had projected a five-day total between $50 million and $55 million. It earned $10.5 million on Black Friday. The film underperformed during its opening weekend, earning $35.4 million and debuting at #2 at the box office behind The Hunger Games: Mockingjay – Part 1, for which 3D accounted for 24% of its opening-weekend gross. The opening-weekend audience was nearly evenly split by age and gender, with 58% under the age of 25 and females accounting for 51%. According to Mogil, the disappointing performance led him to estimate a $14 million fourth-quarter loss for DreamWorks Animation.

The film was released in China on November 14, 2014, two weeks ahead of its North American debut, and earned $11.3 million from 3,500 screens, debuting at number two at the Chinese box office behind Interstellar ($42 million). In its opening weekend, the film earned $36.5 million from 47 markets. By early December, the film had grossed $24 million in China. Top openings were in Russia ($8.2 million), Korea ($6 million), Italy ($4.63 million), Germany ($4.2 million), and Australia ($3.68 million). The film's opening in Germany was the second-highest for an animated film in 2014, behind How to Train Your Dragon 2.

=== Critical response ===
On review aggregator website Rotten Tomatoes, Penguins of Madagascar holds an approval rating of 74% based on 115 reviews, with an average rating of 6.2/10. The site's critical consensus reads, "Penguins of Madagascar is fast and brightly colored enough to entertain small children, but too frantically silly to offer real filmgoing fun for the whole family." On Metacritic, the film achieved a score of 53 out of 100 based on reviews from 31 critics, indicating "mixed or average reviews." Audiences surveyed by CinemaScore gave the film an average grade of "A−" on an A+ to F scale.

Elizabeth Weitzman of the New York Daily News gave the film three out of five stars, saying "Granted, it's no classic, but a sassy script and good-natured voice work from Benedict Cumberbatch and John Malkovich should keep kids and grownups entertained over the holidays." Ignatiy Vishnevetsky of The A.V. Club gave the film a B, saying "Frenetic and frequently funny, Penguins of Madagascar represents the DreamWorks Animation franchise style—which boils down to self-aware, but naïve, talking animals who learn kid-friendly life lessons—at its most palatable." Angie Errigo of Empire earned a three out of five rating, describing it as "the silliest spin-off this side of Elektra, and lots of fun with it." Ben Kenigsberg of The New York Times gave the film a positive review, saying "The lack of originality is offset by sheer silliness, including Classified and Skipper's Abbott and Costello-style argument over whether there's a long I in 'diversion.' The word fits the movie."

Bill Zwecker of the Chicago Sun-Times gave the film three out of four stars, saying "Once again the Madagascar team have come up with a winner – a nice way to kick off the Thanksgiving and holiday filmgoing experience for the whole family." Michael Rechtshaffen of The Hollywood Reporter gave the film a negative review, saying "While there are plenty of madcap antics to fill a feature, all that manic energy ultimately proves to be more exhausting than exhilarating." Jeff Labrecque of Entertainment Weekly gave the film a C−, saying "Penguins of Madagascar aims primarily for the kiddies, racing from one frenetic action sequence to another like some haywire Walter Lantz cartoon."

=== Accolades ===
List of awards and nominations
| Award/Film Festival | Category | Recipient(s) | Result |
|---|---|---|---|
| 42nd Annie Awards | Outstanding Achievement for Animated Effects in an Animated Production | Mitul Patel, Nicolas Delbecq, Santosh Khedkar and Yash Argawal | Nominated |
| 42nd Annie Awards | Outstanding Achievement for Character Animation in an Animated Feature Production | Ravi Kamble | Nominated |
| 42nd Annie Awards | Outstanding Achievement for Character Design in an Animated Feature Production | Craig Kellman, Joe Moshier, Stevie Lewis and Todd Kurosawa | Nominated |
| 51st Cinema Audio Society Awards | Outstanding Achievement in Sound Mixing for Motion Picture - Animated | Tighe Sheldon, Paul N.J. Ottosson, Dennis Sands and Randy K. Singer | Nominated |
| 28th Kids' Choice Awards | Favorite Animated Movie | Eric Darnell and Simon J. Smith | Nominated |
| 11th St. Louis Film Critics Association Awards | Best Animated Film | Eric Darnell and Simon J. Smith | Nominated |

== Video game ==
A video game based on the film, titled Penguins of Madagascar, and published by Little Orbit, was released on November 25, 2014, for Nintendo 3DS, Wii, and Wii U.
