= Simon J. Smith =

British animator, director, and voice actor

- Born: Simon James Smith; Watford, England
- Occupations: Animator; director; voice actor
- Years active: 1997–present
- Employer(s): DreamWorks Animation (1997–2015); Warner Bros. Animation (2015-present)
- Notable work: Antz; Shrek; Shrek 2; Bee Movie; Megamind: The Button of Doom; Penguins of Madagascar; Baymax Dreams; Batwheels

Simon James Smith is a British animator, film director, and voice actor. He is best known for his work at DreamWorks Animation. Smith came to PDI/DreamWorks in 1997 as head of layout for the company's feature film division. A CG animation veteran with nearly 35 years of experience, Smith supervised the layout department on PDI/DreamWorks' first animated feature Antz (1998), serving as the head of layout in Shrek (2001). He then directed the Universal Studios Theatre experience Shrek 4-D, followed by the short Far Far Away Idol. His first feature film as a director was in 2007, with Bee Movie. He then directed another DVD short, Megamind: The Button of Doom, before co-directing, with Eric Darnell, the comedy/spy action spin-off from the Madagascar series, Penguins of Madagascar, the mini series Baymax Dreams for Disney, and is executive producer on Batwheels for Warner Bros.

== Early and personal life ==
Smith was born in Watford, to English parents. He grew up in Hatch End, Middlesex, before moving into London proper in 1982.

== Career ==
Smith began his career in London, where he worked as a boom operator/sound assistant working on various film and TV productions. He discovered video editing at the advertising agency BBDO, editing on the Apple and Pepsi accounts. He then moved over to post production house SVC Television, to continue editing but there he also discovered the computer graphic machine Symbolics. He continued animating and FX supervising on various projects at the editing and effects house Framestore and post house VTR, where he established his own 3D department. Immediately prior to joining PDI/DreamWorks, Smith served at The Mill as the CG supervisor on commercial projects for Nike, Honda, Volvo and VW Polo.

He was a pioneer in the field of pre-visualization, becoming the second ever head of layout in cinema history on the 1998 film Antz, using that skill set to create PDI's Layout/Pre Viz Department which became an integral part of PDI's filmmaking process. Smith was also instrumental in helping to set up a CG layout department for Aardman Animation for the production of Chicken Run. Known for his work on the award-winning pop video "Go West" for the Pet Shop Boys, Smith also received the first ever Gold Leaf Award for his 3D directorial work on the commercial "West Lites". Smith supervised the layout department on PDI/DreamWorks' first animated feature Antz, serving as the head of layout in Shrek. He then directed the Universal Studios Theatre experience Shrek 4-D, followed by the short Far Far Away Idol. His first feature film as a director was in 2007, with Bee Movie. He then directed another DVD short, Megamind: The Button of Doom, before co-helming, with Eric Darnell, the comedy/spy action spin-off from the Madagascar series, Penguins of Madagascar.

He then created, wrote, and directed Baymax Dreams for Disney. A joint Unity/Disney production to prove that a real time engine could be used to make broadcast TV content. Smith won an Emmy for the project. He is currently executive producer/showrunner on the animated superhero children's television series Batwheels starring Ethan Hawke for Warner Bros.

== Film credits ==
=== Directing ===
Year	Title	Notes
2003	Shrek 4-D	
2004	Far Far Away Idol	
2007	Bee Movie	also voice of Truck driver/Chet
2011	Megamind: The Button of Doom	
2014	Penguins of Madagascar	

=== Animation ===
Year	Title	Role	Notes
1998	Antz	Head of Layout	
2000	Chicken Run	Special Thanks	
2001	Shrek	Head of Layout	Also voice of Blind Mouse
2004	Shrek 2	Layout Consultant	
2022	Batwheels	Co-Executive Producer	
