= Annie Award for Outstanding Achievement for Character Design in a Feature Production =

Character design award

Annie Award for Character Design in a Feature Production
- Awarded for: Excellence in animated films
- Country: United States
- Presented by: ASIFA-Hollywood
- First award: 2002
- Currently held by: Scott Watanabe, Ami Thompson – KPop Demon Hunters (2025)
- Website: annieawards.org

The Annie Award for Character Design in an Animated Feature Production is an Annie Award awarded annually to the best character designer and introduced in 2002. It rewards the design and look of characters for animated feature films.

== Winners and nominees ==
‡= live-action nominee

=== 2000s ===
Year	Winners and nominees	Film
2002 (30th)
2002 (30th)	Carlos Grangel	Spirit: Stallion of the Cimarron
2002 (30th)	Peter De Sève	Ice Age
2002 (30th)	Chris Sanders	Lilo and Stitch
2002 (30th)	Ricky Nierva	Monsters, Inc.
2002 (30th)	Peter De Sève	Treasure Planet
2003 (31st)
2003 (31st)	Ricky Nierva	Finding Nemo
2003 (31st)	Rune Bennicke	Brother Bear
2003 (31st)	Carter Goodrich	Sinbad: Legend of the Seven Seas
2004 (32nd)
2004 (32nd)	Tony Fucile	The Incredibles
2004 (32nd)	Joe Moshier	Home on the Range
2004 (32nd)	Teddy Newton	The Incredibles
2004 (32nd)	Carlos Grangel	Shark Tale
2005 (33rd)
2005 (33rd)	Nick Park	Wallace and Gromit: The Curse of the Were-Rabbit
2005 (33rd)	Joe Moshier	Chicken Little
2005 (33rd)	Carlos Grangel	Corpse Bride
2005 (33rd)	Craig Kellman	Madagascar
2005 (33rd)	William Joyce	Robots
2006 (34th)
2006 (34th)	Nico Marlet	Over the Hedge
2006 (34th)	Carter Goodrich	Open Season
2006 (34th)	Peter De Sève	Ice Age: The Meltdown
2007 (35th)
2007 (35th)	Carter Goodrich	Ratatouille
2007 (35th)	Sylvain Deboissy	Surf's Up
2008 (36th)
2008 (36th)	Nico Marlet	Kung Fu Panda
2008 (36th)	Valerie Hadida	Igor
2008 (36th)	Sang Jun Lee	Horton Hears a Who!
2009 (37th)
2009 (37th)	Shane Prigmore	Coraline
2009 (37th)	Shannon Tindle	Coraline
2009 (37th)	Daniel Lopez Muñoz	Up

=== 2010s ===
Year	Winners and nominees	Film
2010 (38th)
2010 (38th)	Nico Marlet	How to Train Your Dragon
2010 (38th)	Carter Goodrich	Despicable Me
2010 (38th)	Sylvain Chomet	The Illusionist
2010 (38th)	Timothy Lamb	Megamind
2011 (39th)
2011 (39th)	Crash McCreery	Rango
2011 (39th)	Peter De Sève	Arthur Christmas
2011 (39th)	Jay Shuster	Cars 2
2011 (39th)	Patrick Mate	Puss in Boots
2011 (39th)	Sergio Pablos	Rio
2012 (40th)
2012 (40th)	Heidi Smith	ParaNorman
2012 (40th)	Carlos Grangel	Hotel Transylvania
2012 (40th)	Carter Goodrich	Hotel Transylvania
2012 (40th)	Yarrow Cheney, Eric Guillon and Colin Stimpson	The Lorax
2012 (40th)	Craig Kellman	Madagascar 3: Europe's Most Wanted
2012 (40th)	Bill Schwab, Lorelay Bove, Cory Loftis and Minkyu Lee	Wreck-it Ralph
2013 (41st)
2013 (41st)	Carter Goodrich, Takao Noguchi and Shane Prigmore	The Croods
2013 (41st)	Craig Kellman	Cloudy With a Chance of Meatballs 2
2013 (41st)	Bill Schwab	Frozen
2013 (41st)	Eric Guillon	Despicable Me 2
2013 (41st)	Christophe Lourdelet	A Monster in Paris
2013 (41st)	Chris Sasaki	Monsters University
2013 (41st)	Sylvain Deboissy and Shannon Tindle	Turbo
2014 (42nd)
2014 (42nd)	Paul Sullivan, Sandra Equihua and Jorge R. Gutiérrez	The Book of Life
2014 (42nd)	Shiyoon Kim and Sang-jin Kim	Big Hero 6
2014 (42nd)	Mike Smith	The Boxtrolls
2014 (42nd)	Craig Kellman, Joe Moshier, Stevie Lewis and Todd Kurosawa	Penguins of Madagascar
2014 (42nd)	Sang Jun Lee, Jason Sadler and José Manuel Fernández Oli	Rio 2
2014 (42nd)	Tomm Moore, Marie Thorhauge, Sandra Norup Andersen and Rosa Ballester Cabo	Song of the Sea
2015 (43rd)
2015 (43rd)	Albert Lozano	Inside Out
2015 (43rd)	Matt Nolte	The Good Dinosaur
2015 (43rd)	Craig Kellman	Hotel Transylvania 2
2015 (43rd)	Eric Guillon	Minions
2016 (44th)
2016 (44th)	Cory Loftis	Zootopia
2016 (44th)	Shannon Tindle	Kubo and the Two Strings
2016 (44th)	Bill Schwab and Sang-jin Kim	Moana
2016 (44th)	Eric Guillon	The Secret Life of Pets
2016 (44th)	Timothy Lamb and Craig Kellman	Trolls
2017 (45th)
2017 (45th)	Daniel Arriaga, Daniela Strijleva, Greg Dykstra, Alonso Martinez and Zaruhi Galstyan	Coco
2017 (45th)	Joe Moshier	The Boss Baby
2017 (45th)	Reza Riahi, Louise Bagnall and Alice Dieudonné	The Breadwinner
2017 (45th)	Eric Guillon	Despicable Me 3
2017 (45th)	Patrick Mate	Smurfs: The Lost Village
2018 (46th)
2018 (46th)	Shiyoon Kim	Spider-Man: Into the Spider-Verse
2018 (46th)	Marceline Gagnon-Tanguay	Next Gen
2018 (46th)	Matt Nolte	Incredibles 2
2018 (46th)	James Woods‡	Mary Poppins Returns
2018 (46th)	Ami Thompson	Ralph Breaks the Internet
2019 (47th)
2019 (47th)	Torsten Schrank	Klaus
2019 (47th)	Nico Marlet	Abominable
2019 (47th)	Craig Kellman	The Addams Family
2019 (47th)	Bill Schwab	Frozen 2
2019 (47th)	José Manuel Fernández Oli	Spies in Disguise

=== 2020s ===
Year	Winners and nominees	Film
2020 (48th)
2020 (48th)	Federico Pirovano	Wolfwalkers
2020 (48th)	Daniel López Muñoz	Soul
2020 (48th)	Joe Pitt	The Croods: A New Age
2020 (48th)	Craig Kellman	The Willoughbys
2020 (48th)	Timothy Lamb	Trolls World Tour
2021 (49th)
2021 (49th)	Lindsey Olivares	The Mitchells vs. the Machines
2021 (49th)	Deanna Marsigliese	Luca
2021 (49th)	Ami Thompson	Raya and the Last Dragon
2021 (49th)	Julien Bizat	Ron's Gone Wrong
2021 (49th)	Joe Moshier	Vivo
2022 (50th)
2022 (50th)	Taylor Krahenbuhl	The Bad Guys
2022 (50th)	Massimiliano Narciso	Luck
2022 (50th)	Jesús Alonso Iglesias	Puss in Boots: The Last Wish
2022 (50th)	Ida Hem	Rise of the Teenage Mutant Ninja Turtles: The Movie
2022 (50th)	Pablo Lobato	Wendell & Wild
2023 (51st)
2023 (51st)	Jesús Alonso Iglesias	Spider-Man: Across the Spider-Verse
2023 (51st)	Maria Yi	Elemental
2023 (51st)	Nikolas Ilic	Merry Little Batman
2023 (51st)	Aidan Sugano	Nimona
2023 (51st)	Daniel Fernandez Casas	Robot Dreams
2024 (52nd)
2024 (52nd)	Genevieve Tsai	The Wild Robot
2024 (52nd)	Deanna Marsigliese	Inside Out 2
2024 (52nd)	Nathan Jurevicius	Scarygirl
2024 (52nd)	Guillermo Ramíre	Spellbound
2024 (52nd)	Uwe Heidschötter	That Christmas
2025 (53rd)
2025 (53rd)	Scott Watanabe and Ami Thompson	KPop Demon Hunters
2025 (53rd)	Matt Nolte, Yingzong Xin, James Woods, Kaleb Rice and Bob Pauley	Elio
2025 (53rd)	Craig Kellman	Fixed
2025 (53rd)	Adam Paloian, Thaddeus Couldron and Alvi Ramirez	The SpongeBob Movie: Search for SquarePants
2025 (53rd)	Kei Acedera, Tristan Poulain, Jules Rigolle, Fernando Peque and Remi Salmon	The Twits
