= Annie Award for Outstanding Achievement for Storyboarding in a Feature Production =

Annual US film award

Annie Award for Storyboarding in a Feature Production
- Awarded for: Excellence in storyboarding for animated feature productions
- Country: United States
- Presented by: ASIFA-Hollywood
- First award: 1995
- Currently held by: Anthony Holden and Young Ki Yoon – The Bad Guys 2 (2025)
- Website: annieawards.org

The Annie Award for Storyboard in an Animated Feature Production is an Annie Award awarded annually to the best storyboard artist and introduced in 1995. It rewards animation of characters for animated feature films.

Up until the creation of the Annie Award for Storyboarding in a TV Production, TV series, animated shorts, and non-theatrical releases were eligible for nomination in this category.

== Winners and nominees ==
*= non-feature nominee
^=non-theatrical nominee
†=live-action nominee

=== 1990s ===
Year	Winners and nominees	Film/Television
1995 (23rd)
1995 (23rd)	Kazuo Terada	Gargoyles (Episode: "Reawakening")*
1995 (23rd)	Warwick Gilbert	Aladdin (Episode: "The Lost Ones")
1995 (23rd)	Denise Koyama	Aladdin (Episode: "The Secret of Dagger Rock")*
1995 (23rd)	Brian Pimental	A Goofy Movie
1995 (23rd)	Genndy Tartakovsky*	Dexter's Laboratory*
1996 (24th)
1996 (24th)	Rusty Mills	A Pinky and the Brain Christmas
1996 (24th)	Barry Caldwell	Animaniacs*
1996 (24th)	Brenda Chapman and Will Finn	The Hunchback of Notre Dame
1996 (24th)	Rodolphe Guenoden	Balto
1996 (24th)	Hiroshi Ohno	Gargoyles*
1996 (24th)	Joe Ranft	James and the Giant Peach
1997 (25th)
1997 (25th)	Not awarded	
1998 (26th)
1998 (26th)	Chris Sanders	Mulan
1998 (26th)	Li Hong	Ferngully 2: The Magical Rescue^
1999 (27th)
1999 (27th)	Mark Andrews	The Iron Giant
1999 (27th)	Lorna Cook	The Prince of Egypt
1999 (27th)	Kevin O' Brien	The Iron Giant
1999 (27th)	Dean Wellins	The Iron Giant
1999 (27th)	Brian Pimental	Tarzan

=== 2000s ===
Year	Winners and nominees	Film
2000 (28th)
2000 (28th)	Dan Jeup and Joe Ranft	Toy Story 2
2000 (28th)	Thom Enriquez	Dinosaur
2000 (28th)	Jeff Snow	The Road to El Dorado
2001 (29th)
2001 (29th)	Rob Koo	Shrek
2001 (29th)	Stephen Anderson	The Emperor's New Groove
2001 (29th)	Don Hall	The Emperor's New Groove
2001 (29th)	Chris Ure	Atlantis: The Lost Empire
2001 (29th)	Wendell Washer	Tweety's High-Flying Adventure^
2002 (30th)
2002 (30th)	Ronnie Del Carmen	Spirit: Stallion of the Cimarron
2002 (30th)	Larry Leker	Spirit: Stallion of the Cimarron
2002 (30th)	Simon Wells	Spirit: Stallion of the Cimarron
2003 (31st)
2003 (31st)	Sharon Forward	The Jungle Book 2
2003 (31st)	Dean Roberts	101 Dalmatians II: Patch's London Adventure^
2003 (31st)	Holly Forsyth	The Jungle Book 2
2003 (31st)	Chris Otsuki	The Jungle Book 2
2003 (31st)	Dave Prince	The Jungle Book 2
2004 (32nd)
2004 (32nd)	Kevin O'Brien	The Incredibles
2004 (32nd)	Chen-Yi Chang	Home on the Range
2004 (32nd)	Ted Mathot	The Incredibles
2004 (32nd)	Chris Otsuki	Winnie the Pooh: Springtime with Roo^
2004 (32nd)	Conrad Vernon	Shrek 2
2005 (33rd)
2005 (33rd)	Bob Persichetti	Wallace and Gromit: The Curse of the Were-Rabbit
2005 (33rd)	Tom McGrath	Madagascar
2005 (33rd)	Catherine Yuh Rader	Madagascar
2005 (33rd)	Chris Otsuki	Kronk's New Groove^
2005 (33rd)	Michael Salter	Wallace and Gromit: The Curse of the Were-Rabbit
2006 (34th)
2006 (34th)	Gary Graham	Over the Hedge
2006 (34th)	William H. Frake III	Ice Age: The Meltdown
2006 (34th)	Kris Pearn	Open Season
2006 (34th)	Thom Enriquez	Over the Hedge
2006 (34th)	Simon Wells	Flushed Away
2007 (35th)
2007 (35th)	Ted Mathot	Ratatouille
2007 (35th)	Nassos Vakalis	Bee Movie
2007 (35th)	Don Hall	Meet the Robinsons
2007 (35th)	Denise Koyama	Surf's Up
2007 (35th)	Sean Song	TMNT
2008 (36th)
2008 (36th)	Jennifer Yuh Nelson	Kung Fu Panda
2008 (36th)	Joe Mateo	Bolt
2008 (36th)	Alessandro Carloni	Kung Fu Panda
2008 (36th)	Rob Stevenhagen	The Tale of Despereaux
2008 (36th)	Ronnie Del Carmen	WALL-E
2009 (37th)
2009 (37th)	Tom Owens	Monsters vs. Aliens
2009 (37th)	Sharon Bridgeman	Astro Boy
2009 (37th)	Chris Butler	Coraline
2009 (37th)	Ronnie Del Carmen	Up
2009 (37th)	Peter Sohn	Up

=== 2010s ===
Year	Winners and nominees	Film
2010 (38th)
2010 (38th)	Tom Owens	How to Train Your Dragon
2010 (38th)	Paul Fisher	Shrek Forever After
2010 (38th)	Alessandro Carloni	How to Train Your Dragon
2010 (38th)	Catherine Yuh Rader	Megamind
2011 (39th)
2011 (39th)	Jeremy Spears	Winnie the Pooh
2011 (39th)	Kris Pearn	Arthur Christmas
2011 (39th)	Scott Morse	Cars 2
2011 (39th)	Nelson Yokota	Gnomeo & Juliet
2011 (39th)	Gary Graham	Kung Fu Panda 2
2011 (39th)	Phillip Craven	Kung Fu Panda 2
2011 (39th)	Bob Logan	Puss in Boots
2011 (39th)	Delia Gosman	Rango
2011 (39th)	Josh Hayes	Rango
2012 (40th)
2012 (40th)	Johanne Matte	Rise of the Guardians
2012 (40th)	Rob Koo	Madagascar 3: Europe's Most Wanted
2012 (40th)	Emanuela Cozzi	Paranorman
2012 (40th)	Leo Matsuda	Wreck-it Ralph
2012 (40th)	Lissa Treiman	Wreck-it Ralph
2013 (41st)
2013 (41st)	Dean Kelly	Monsters University
2013 (41st)	Steven A. Macleod	The Croods
2013 (41st)	Eric Favela	Despicable Me 2
2013 (41st)	John Ripa	Frozen
2013 (41st)	Jason Hand	Planes
2014 (42nd)
2014 (42nd)	Tron Mai	How to Train Your Dragon 2
2014 (42nd)	Marc Smith	Big Hero 6
2014 (42nd)	Emanuela Cozzi	The Boxtrolls
2014 (42nd)	Julian Nariño	The Boxtrolls
2014 (42nd)	Piero Piluso	Planes: Fire and Rescue
2014 (42nd)	John E. Hurst	Rio 2
2014 (42nd)	Rodrigo Perez-Castro	Rio 2
2015 (43rd)
2015 (43rd)	Tony Rosenast	Inside Out
2015 (43rd)	Antonio Santamaria	Extraordinary Tales
2015 (43rd)	Enrico Casarosa, Tony Rosenast and Jean-Philippe Vine	The Good Dinosaur
2015 (43rd)	Bill Presing	The Good Dinosaur
2015 (43rd)	Rosana Sullivan	The Good Dinosaur
2015 (43rd)	Mike Smukavic	Hotel Transylvania 2
2015 (43rd)	Domee Shi	Inside Out
2015 (43rd)	Habib Louati	Minions
2016 (44th)
2016 (44th)	Dean Wellins	Zootopia
2016 (44th)	Trevor Jimenez	Finding Dory
2016 (44th)	Mark Garcia	Kubo and the Two Strings
2016 (44th)	Normand Lemay	Moana
2016 (44th)	Claire Morrissey	Trolls
2017 (45th)
2017 (45th)	Dean Kelly	Coco
2017 (45th)	Glenn Harmon	The Boss Baby
2017 (45th)	Julien Regnard	The Breadwinner
2017 (45th)	Madeline Sharafian	Coco
2017 (45th)	Louie Del Carmen	The Star
2018 (46th)
2018 (46th)	Dean Kelly	Incredibles 2
2018 (46th)	Habib Louati	The Grinch
2018 (46th)	Bobby Rubio	Incredibles 2
2018 (46th)	Ovi Nedelcu	Mary Poppins Returns†
2018 (46th)	Michael Herrera	Ralph Breaks the Internet
2019 (47th)
2019 (47th)	Sergio Pablos	Klaus
2019 (47th)	Julien Bisaro	I Lost My Body
2019 (47th)	Jérémy Clapin	I Lost My Body
2019 (47th)	Julián Nariño	Missing Link
2019 (47th)	Oliver Thomas	Missing Link

=== 2020s ===
Year	Winners and nominees	Film
2020 (48th)
2020 (48th)	Trevor Jimenez	Soul
2020 (48th)	Evon Freeman	The Croods: A New Age
2020 (48th)	Goro Miyazaki	Earwig and the Witch
2020 (48th)	Glen Keane	Over the Moon
2020 (48th)	Guillaume Lorin	Wolfwalkers
2021 (49th)
2021 (49th)	Jason Hand	Encanto
2021 (49th)	Steven Garcia	The Addams Family 2
2021 (49th)	Luis Logam	Raya and the Last Dragon
2021 (49th)	Gary Graham	Spirit Untamed
2021 (49th)	Carlos Romero	Vivo
2022 (50th)
2022 (50th)	Anthony Holden	Puss in Boots: The Last Wish
2022 (50th)	Nima Azarba	Minions: The Rise of Gru
2022 (50th)	Dave Feiss	Minions: The Rise of Gru
2022 (50th)	Jeff Snow	Strange World
2022 (50th)	Javier Ledesma Barboll	Strange World
2023 (51st)
2023 (51st)	Hayao Miyazaki	The Boy and the Heron
2023 (51st)	Richard Phelan	Chicken Run: Dawn of the Nugget
2023 (51st)	Esteban Bravo	Nimona
2023 (51st)	Maca Gil	Robot Dreams
2023 (51st)	Makoto Shinkai	Suzume
2024 (52nd)
2024 (52nd)	Habib Louati	Despicable Me 4
2024 (52nd)	Ryan Green	Moana 2
2024 (52nd)	Piero Piluso	Saving Bikini Bottom: The Sandy Cheeks Movie
2024 (52nd)	Alex Relloso Horna and Carlos Zapater Oliva	Spellbound
2024 (52nd)	Ashley Boddy, Lorenzo Fresta and Helen Schroeder	That Christmas
2025 (53rd)
2025 (53rd)	Anthony Holden and Young Ki Yoon	The Bad Guys 2
2025 (53rd)	Ugo Bienvenu	Arco
2025 (53rd)	Tony Rosenast	Elio
2025 (53rd)	Nicolas Pawlowski	Little Amélie or the Character of Rain
2025 (53rd)	Hikari Toriumi	Zootopia 2
