= Steve Hickner =

American screenwriter, film director and film producer

- Occupations: Animator, director
- Years active: 1981–present
- Employer: DreamWorks Animation
- Notable work: The Prince of Egypt; Bee Movie
- Awards: Critics' Choice Movie Award for Best Animated Feature; The Prince of Egypt (1998)
- Website: https://www.stevehickner.com/

Steve Hickner is an American animator and director at DreamWorks Animation. He is best known for directing DreamWorks animated films such as The Prince of Egypt and Bee Movie. He won the Critics' Choice Movie Award for Best Animated Feature and was also nominated for the Satellite Award for Best Animated or Mixed Media Feature for his work on The Prince of Egypt.

== Early life ==
Hickner was inspired to work in animation by his high school English teacher, who suggested he should find a career in the animation industry. This suggestion encouraged him to create an animated film after school. Hickner described this film as “terrible,” because he lacked knowledge of how to properly animate. At first he desired to become a cartoonist, but later he decided to become an animator. Hickner cited some of his biggest influences as Walt Disney and the Warner Brothers. After High School he went to the New York University Film school where he studied Film Production B.F.A.

== Career ==
While in school, Hickner contacted, and was hired by a man named Kay Wright. He spent over thirty-five years working at DreamWorks, Disney, Amblimation, Aardman, Hanna-Barbera and Filmation. He has produced the films, An American Tail: Fievel Goes West, We're Back! A Dinosaur's Story and Balto. His directing credits include Bee Movie and The Prince of Egypt. Hickner also contributed to Who Framed Roger Rabbit, The Little Mermaid, The Great Mouse Detective, Madagascar, Shrek Forever After, Mr. Peabody & Sherman and Home. He has contributed to location-based entertainment projects in Singapore, Dubai, China, London, and Hollywood. Hickner has been a guest speaker at many colleges and universities, film festivals and animation events. He has also authored two books: Animation Rules! 52 Ways to Achieve Creative Success and Animating Your Career.

== Filmography ==
=== Television ===
Year	Title	Notes
1981	The New Adventures of Zorro	storyboard artist
1981	Blackstar	storyboard artist
1982	Pac-Man	story director
1983	The Dukes	story director
1983-1985	He-Man and the Masters of the Universe	storyboard artist
2010	Kung Fu Panda Holiday	story artist

=== Film ===
Year	Title	Notes
1985	The Black Cauldron	in between artist
1986	The Great Mouse Detective	key assistant animator
1988	Who Framed Roger Rabbit	production coordinator: animation
1989	The Little Mermaid	assistant production manager: clean-up
1991	An American Tail: Fievel Goes West	associate producer
1993	We're Back! A Dinosaur's Story	producer
1995	Balto	producer
1998	Antz	additional story artist
1998	The Prince of Egypt	director
2000	The Road to El Dorado	additional storyboard artist
2000	Joseph: King of Dreams	executive producer
2004	Shark Tale	story artist
2005	Madagascar	additional story artist
2006	Over the Hedge	additional story artist
2007	Bee Movie	director
2008	Kung Fu Panda: Secrets of the Furious Five	storyboard artist
2010	Shrek Forever After	additional story artist
2010	Donkey's Caroling Christmas-tacular	story artist
2011	Night of the Living Carrots	storyboard artist
2011	Book of Dragons	director/writer
2014	Mr. Peabody & Sherman	storyboard artist
2015	Home	additional story artist

=== Internet ===
Year	Title	Notes
2016	Cartoons VS Cancer	Himself
