= Leslee Feldman =

American casting director

Leslee Feldman is the Head of Casting and Voice Director at Amblin Partners and is the former Head of Casting and Voice Director at DreamWorks, the studio which produced such films as Shrek, The Prince of Egypt, Road to Perdition, Old School, and Anchorman: The Legend of Ron Burgundy, among others. Feldman was Casting and Voice Director for movies including Shrek 2, The Boss Baby, Shark Tale, and Madagascar.

In 2023 she received the Hoyt Bowers Award for excellence in casting and outstanding contribution to the casting profession.
