= Styrobot =

Sculptures by Michael Salter

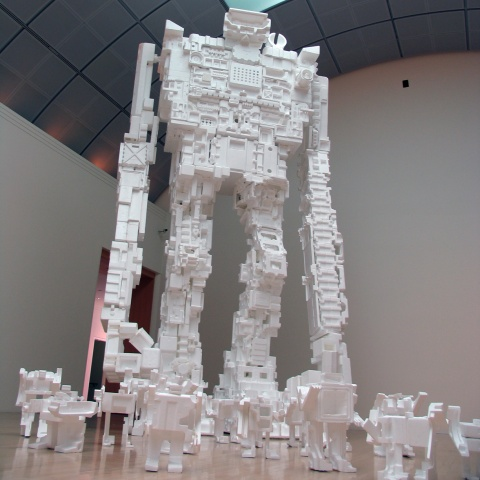
Giant Styrobot installation at the San Jose Museum of Art, 2008, 22 feet high.

Styrobot is the name applied to a number of site-specific sculptural assemblages created by the artist Michael Salter. Robotic figures puzzled together from discarded polystyrene packing forms, Styrobots have risen ceiling-high to dominate their space. Although Styrobots are often intimidating in size, their postures are generally non-threatening, at times meditative.

== Origins ==
Salter has a history of using found materials in his work Around 2003, inspired by their "mechanical" shapes, Salter assembled a number of the pre-formed pieces into his first "big one." The six-foot tall figure led to a solo show at the Southeastern Center for Contemporary Art in Winston-Salem, where, in a 30-foot high available space, former curator David J. Brown suggested: "Why don't you make a really big one?" With that, Salter says, "I went to town." His giant Styrobots have since appeared in shows in New York City, Los Angeles, Houston, Miami, and Brussels, Belgium.

== Interpretations ==
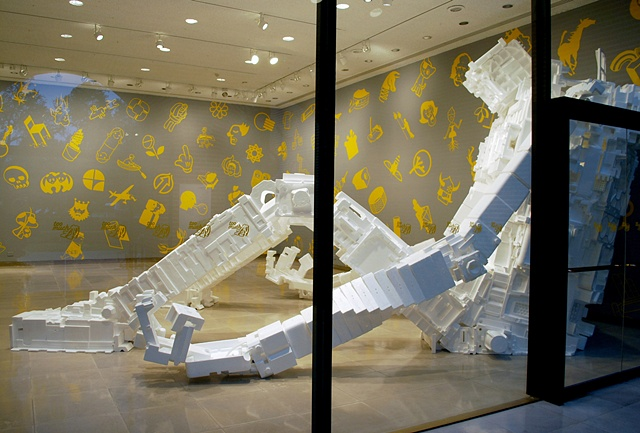
too much installation at the Rice University Art Gallery, 2008

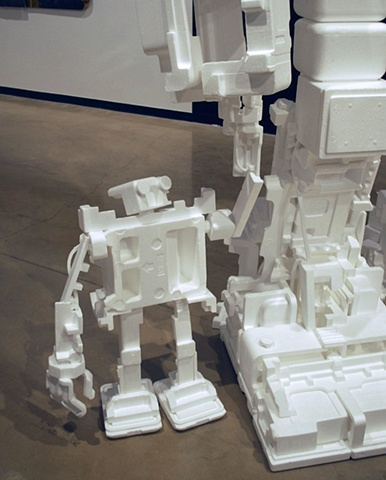
Big Styrobot and little buddy installation, Ulrich Museum of Art, 2009

In his review of Salter's 2008 show at the Jeff Bailey Gallery in New York, critic Edward Leffingwell characterized the massive Styrobot as demonstrating the notion that the artist "seems to toy with the replicable quality of a culture represented by freshly designed or appropriated images." "It more or less dominated the space," Bailey said. Curator David Brown has written that "the Styrobots are dazzling in their splendor, ambitious in their realization, and serve evidence to the artist's expansive interest in the bombardment of images that we suffer." For Salter's 2009 installation If You Don't Buy It From Us, It's Not Our Problem, think.21 Gallery in Brussels proposed the figure of the Styrobot as:

"commenting on waste, the re-use of discarded material, and our uneasy relationship technology. The object itself can appear intriguing and beautiful. At first it appears to be a friendly machine, yet after close inspection it nevertheless reveals a much alarming reality. The polystyrene robot becomes a fearsome symbol of human consuming folly that is set to destroy mankind."

== Etymology ==
The word "Styrobot" is a portmanteau of the words "Styrofoam" and "robot".
