= Balto (film) =

1995 American film directed by Simon Wells

- Theatrical release poster by John Alvin
- Directed by: Simon Wells
- Screenplay by: Cliff Ruby; Elana Lesser; David Steven Cohen; Roger S. H. Schulman
- Story by: Cliff Ruby; Elana Lesser
- Produced by: Steve Hickner
- Starring: Kevin Bacon; Bridget Fonda; Phil Collins; Bob Hoskins
- Cinematography: Jan Richter-Friis (live-action)
- Edited by: Renee Edwards; Nick Fletcher; Sim Evan-Jones
- Music by: James Horner
- Production companies: Universal Cartoon Studios; Amblin Entertainment; Amblimation
- Distributed by: Universal Pictures
- Release dates: December 22, 1995 (United States); March 29, 1996 (United Kingdom)
- Running time: 78 minutes
- Countries: United Kingdom; United States
- Language: English
- Budget: $31 million
- Box office: $11 million

Balto is a 1995 animated adventure film directed by Simon Wells, produced by Amblin Entertainment, and distributed by Universal Pictures. It is loosely based on the true story of the dog Balto, who helped save children infected with diphtheria in the 1925 serum run to Nome. The film stars voice actors Kevin Bacon, Bridget Fonda, Phil Collins, and Bob Hoskins. Though primarily an animated film, it uses a live-action framing device that takes place in New York City's Central Park and features Miriam Margolyes as an older version of one of the children. This is the third and final film to be produced by Steven Spielberg's Amblimation animation studio, before the studio's closure in 1997.

Released theatrically in the United States on December 22, 1995, the film was a financial failure due to being overshadowed by the release of Toy Story, but its subsequent sales on home video led to two direct-to-video sequels: Balto II: Wolf Quest (2002) and Balto III: Wings of Change (2004).

== Plot ==
In New York City, an elderly woman and her granddaughter are walking through Central Park, looking for a memorial statue. While they rest, the grandmother recounts a story about Nome, Alaska.

In 1925, a wolfdog named Balto lives on the outskirts of Nome with his adoptive goose father Boris alongside two polar bears named Muk and Luk. Balto is ridiculed by dogs and humans alike for his half-breed heritage. His only friends in town are a young girl named Rosy and her red husky Jenna whom Balto has a crush on. He is challenged by the town's favorite sled dog Steele, a fierce and arrogant Alaskan Malamute.

That night, Rosy and all the children in Nome are stricken with diphtheria. Severe winter weather conditions prevent medicine from being brought by air or sea from Anchorage, and the closest rail line ends in Nenana. After authorization to transport the antitoxin by rail is given by the Governor of Alaska, a dog race is held to determine the best-fit dogs for a sled dog team to get the medicine. Balto enters and wins, but is disqualified after Steele exposes his wolf-dog heritage. The team departs that night with Steele in the lead and picks up the medicine successfully. On return, deteriorating conditions leave the disoriented team stranded at the base of a steep slope with the musher knocked unconscious.

When the news reaches Nome, Balto sets out in search of them with Boris, Muk, and Luk . On the way, a huge grizzly bear attacks them, but Jenna, who followed their tracks, intervenes. The bear pursues Balto out onto a frozen lake, where it falls through the ice and drowns. With Jenna injured and unable to continue, Balto instructs Boris and the polar bears to take her back home while he continues alone. Balto eventually finds the team, but Steele refuses his help and attacks him until he loses his balance and falls off a cliff. Balto takes charge of the team, but they lose their way again since Steele had sabotaged the trail as revenge. Balto falls while attempting to save the medicine from falling down a cliff.

Back in Nome, Jenna explains Balto's mission to the other dogs as Steele returns, lying that the team, including Balto, is dead. Jenna sees through his deception and creates an aurora-like signal on the outskirts of town, hoping it will help guide Balto home. When Balto regains consciousness, he is ready to lose hope, until a white wolf appears. Encouraged by the wolf, he drags the medicine back up the cliff to the waiting team. Balto's advanced senses filter out the false markers Steele had created.

After encountering further challenges, Balto and the sled team finally return to Nome with the medicine (losing one vial along the way), allowing the doctors to cure the children. A pity-playing Steele is abandoned by the other dogs after his lies are exposed. Reunited with Jenna and his friends, Balto earns respect from both the dogs and the humans. He visits a cured Rosy, who thanks him for saving her.

Back in the present, the elderly woman and her granddaughter finally find the statue of Balto. The woman, who is actually Rosy, once again thanks Balto for saving her.

== Cast ==
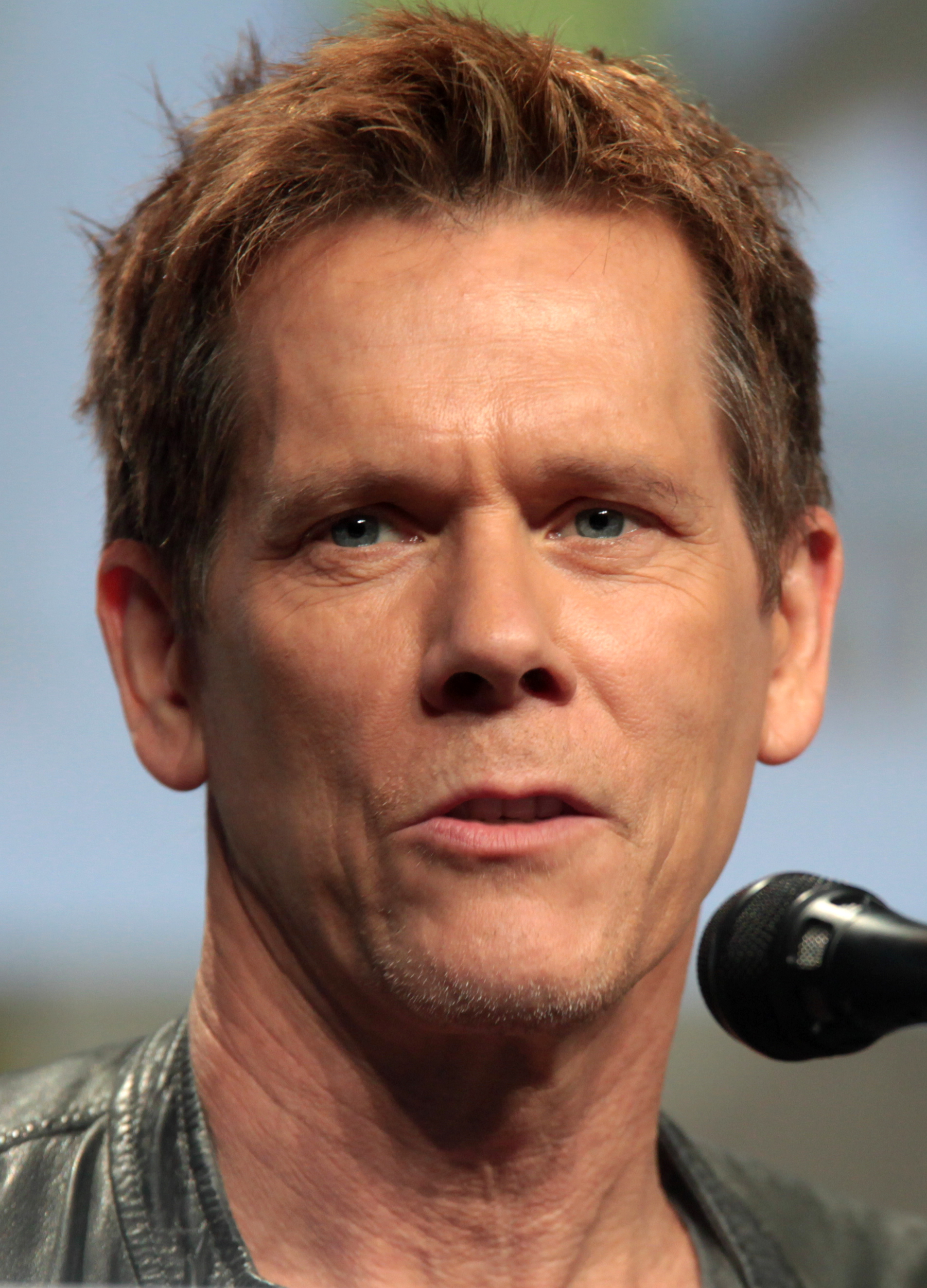
Kevin Bacon voices Balto.

- Kevin Bacon as Balto, a brown-and-grey wolfdog; being a Siberian Husky-Arctic wolf hybrid. Jeffrey James Varab and Dick Zondag served as the supervising animators for Balto. Bacon is succeeded by Maurice LaMarche in the direct-to-video sequels, Balto II: Wolf Quest and Balto III: Wings of Change.
- Bob Hoskins as Boris Goosinov, a Russian snow goose and Balto's caretaker, mentor, adoptive father, and sidekick. Kristof Serrand served as the supervising animator for Boris. Hoskins is succeeded by his Who Framed Roger Rabbit co-star, Charles Fleischer in the sequels.
- Bridget Fonda as Jenna, a female copper-and-white Siberian Husky, Rosy's pet, and Balto's love interest. Her facial design is based on actress Audrey Hepburn. Robert Stevenhagen served as the supervising animator for Jenna. Fonda is succeeded by Jodi Benson in the sequels.
- Jim Cummings as Steele, a fierce-looking black-and-white Alaskan Malamute who bullies Balto over his part-wolf heritage and also has a crush on Jenna. Sahin Ersöz served as the supervising animator for Steele. Brendan Fraser was originally cast to voice Steele before being replaced by Cummings.
- Phil Collins as Muk and Luk, a pair of polar bears, Boris's adoptive nephews, and Balto's adoptive cousins. Nicolas Marlet designed and served as the supervising animator for Muk and Luk. Collins is succeeded by Kevin Schon in the sequels.
- Juliette Brewer as Rosy, a kind, excitable girl and Jenna's owner who was the only human in Nome who was kind to Balto before his epic journey. David Bowers served as the supervising animator for Rosy. Rosy makes a brief cameo in Balto III: Wings of Change.
  - Miriam Margolyes as old Rosy in the live-action sequences who narrates her story to her granddaughter at the beginning of the film.
- Jack Angel, Danny Mann, and Robbie Rist as Nikki, Kaltag, and Star, respectively. Nikki is a reddish-brown Chow Chow, Kaltag is a honey-yellow Chinook, and Star is a mauve-and-cream Siberian Husky. William Salazar was the supervising animator for the team. Nikki, Kaltag, and Star make brief cameos in Balto III: Wings of Change.
- Sandra Dickinson as Dixie, a female Pomeranian and one of Jenna's friends who adores Steele until his lies about Balto are exposed by Balto returning with the medicine needed to cure the children. Dickinson also voices Sylvie, a female Afghan Hound who is also Jenna's friend; and Rosy's mother. Patrick Mate designed and served as the supervising animator for Sylvie and Dixie, and all the principal human characters. Sylvie makes a brief cameo in Balto III: Wings of Change.
- Lola Bates-Campbell as Rosy's granddaughter who appears in the live-action sequences and is accompanied by her dog Blaze, a purebred Siberian Husky.
- William Roberts as Rosy's father
- Donald Sinden as Doc, an old St. Bernard. Doc makes a brief cameo in Balto III: Wings of Change.
- Garrick Hagon as a telegraph operator
- Bill Bailey as a butcher

== Production ==
=== Development ===
Screenwriter Elana Lesser recalled first hearing the story of Balto from her grandfather as a child, and as an adult, decided that it would make an excellent animated and live-action film. She and her husband, fellow screenwriter Cliff Ruby, pitched a screenplay to Amblin Entertainment in Universal City, California, and executives Douglas Wood and Bonne Radford relayed it to co-directors Phil Nibbelink and Simon Wells at Amblin's London-based animation studio, Amblimation. Steven Spielberg agreed that the story had potential, but he was initially concerned that such a film would not be colorful enough. To reassure Spielberg, Wells showed him several color studies by production designer Hans Bacher, which showed that the film would not simply depict black and white dogs against desolate scenery. Nibbelink and Wells had initially developed Balto together, before Nibbelink left to continue working on We're Back! A Dinosaur's Story (1993), and screenwriters Roger S. H. Schulman and David Steven Cohen, and several uncredited writers, further developed the script.

=== Animation ===
Balto was officially put into production in March 1993, under the working title Snowballs. To source the dogs' character animation, the filmmakers set up special drawing classes with about seven Siberian Huskies and videotaped them walking around the studio, while the animators studied their movements and anatomy. During these classes, Kristof Serrand, who was assigned to supervise the animation on Boris, gave a lecture on the locomotion of dogs. Former Disney animator Jeffrey J. Varab, who had trained under Eric Larson and joined Amblimation during production on We're Back!, was assigned to co-supervise the animation on Balto alongside Dick Zondag. At Wells's behest, Varab lectured about dog anatomy and Balto's drawings, based on his work on The Fox and the Hound (1981), and citing preliminary character sketches drawn by character designer Carlos Grangel and original model sheets of Tramp from Lady and the Tramp (1955). Prior to his departure from the project, Nibbelink lectured on applying spacing and weight to the dog animation, using the "bouncing ball" animation exercise he had learned from Frank Thomas while working as an animator at Disney alongside Varab. Wells and several other crew members took special trips to Finland to study dog sledding.

Budget constraints necessitated many difficult decisions. It was calculated that in most shots, the effects animators must choose either footprints or shadows. To achieve the snow colors and textures that Bacher's production design mandated, the background artists needed to use oil paint, instead of the gouache or watercolor in most animated films. Because oil paint dries more slowly than gouache, the filmmakers scheduled extra days for each background to dry before shooting scenes. According to producer Steve Hickner, an advantage of this was that the artists could "work back into their art" days later, while the paint was still wet.

Principal animation lasted from 1993 to 1994, with each animator completing five seconds of animation a week on average; Ken Keys, one of the animators on Steele, stated that he was "throwing away nine drawings to keep one". The film is mainly hand-drawn, but with considerable computer animation in more challenging visual elements; all of the falling snow was animated using an early CGI particle system. All of the ink-and-paint work is the first use in film of the 2D animation software program Toonz, which was still in development and needing intense interactivity with its developers. Additional animation was provided by the Danish studio A. Film Production. Each shot was composited digitally and transferred to film through a "Solitaire" film recorder, before being spliced into the leica reel.

=== Casting ===
Wells stated that the casting process was easy, explaining "Basically, you pick your dream [actors] and see if you can get them." Because the characters were designed before the voices were cast, the actors were given several inspirational character sketches to look at before each recording session, in order to get a sense of the characters they were portraying. Initially, it was reported that Kevin Anderson had been cast as Balto. Anderson had finished all of his voice-over work and the animation had been done around his performance, but late into production, Universal Pictures insisted on having a bigger name in the role, so he was replaced by Kevin Bacon, who had been filming Apollo 13 (1995) at Universal around the same time. Because of the completed animation, Bacon had to precisely match his timing to Balto's mouth movement. According to Bacon, "It was very hard. I didn't like it. They would play his dialogue in the way that he had said it in my head right before I'd say my line." Wells said he "did a terrific job and was really enthusiastic".

Similarly, Brendan Fraser, who was filming Airheads (1994) at the time, was originally cast as Steele, because Wells had envisioned Steele as a school quarterback jock carried away by his sense of importance, and said that Fraser fit that personality well. According to Wells, "I liked Brendan a great deal, and we did one recording session with him that was terrific." However, Spielberg wanted to feel a clearer sense of Steele's "inherent evil", so Fraser was replaced by Jim Cummings. Wells stated that Cummings "did a fantastic job, and totally made the character live, so I don't regret the choice". Cummings was officially cast by January 1995, though Anderson was still listed at the time. According to Cummings, several other on-camera actors were brought in to replace Fraser, before the role ultimately went to him. Spielberg, having been too busy with Schindler's List (1993) to attend Fraser's recording sessions, and not wanting to reject yet another unsatisfactory performance based on footage viewings, also insisted on directing Cummings personally, and completing his recording in one day.

Jennifer Blanc also originally voiced Jenna, but she was also subsequently replaced by Bridget Fonda. Fonda explained in an interview with Bobbie Wygant that she was offered the role of Jenna via phone call, and accepted after being shown a rough cut on tape, which showed some shots in finished form, some still in pencil test form, and some missing. When asked how hard it was to be doing voice-over work for animation for the first time, she explained, "It was odd, it was different. It was challenging. It was exhausting in that I had to be more active, and more outgoing vocally than usually. And syncing up to animated is very difficult. But, y'know, it was just so imaginative, and satisfying in a different way."

Bob Hoskins voiced Boris, having previously collaborated with Spielberg on Who Framed Roger Rabbit (1988) and Hook (1991). Wells stated that his performance helped shape Boris, praising it as "a lot more emotional and effusive than we had originally conceived the character to be". Wells recalled Hoskins's brief struggle with Boris's accent and angrily venting that he "used to have a career [before] playing a goose". Phil Collins had never done voice-over work before, but actively expressed interest in the dual role of Muk and Luk, and called Amblimation to ask for the role. Wells praised his voice for Muk as "just head and shoulders better than anything else we heard". In his autobiography, Jack Angel stated that he, Danny Mann, and Robbie Rist were flown to London to record their respective roles as Nikki, Kaltag, and Star together, and he brought his wife, Arlene Thornton. Angel added that although they had no personal interaction with Spielberg, he flew Angel, Mann, and Rist out again after they had finished recording their roles, because "somebody apparently didn't get it right the first time".

=== Live-action segments ===
Screenwriter Frank Deese, who was already writing a script draft for Small Soldiers (1998) that Amblin later rejected, was hired by Radford to script the live-action prologue and epilogue segments in 1994, though he received no credit in the finished film. The two segments were filmed on-location in Central Park later that year, over a period of one to two days. Closing down the area for filming proved to be a challenge, due to uncooperative locals. However, Wells greatly enjoyed working with Miriam Margolyes, and was impressed with how well she worked with Lola Bates-Campbell, who played Rosy's granddaughter.

=== Music ===
The film score was composed by James Horner, who had previously scored An American Tail: Fievel Goes West (1991) and We're Back! A Dinosaur's Story (1993). According to Wells, because Horner worked in California, and Amblimation was based in London, he "preferred to present his score as the orchestral finished product, and make alterations based on notes from that finished product". Horner also collaborated with songwriting duo Barry Mann and Cynthia Weil to write an original song, "Reach for the Light", sung by Steve Winwood, which plays over the film's end credits. It was initially reported that the end credits would feature a song co-written by Neil Diamond and Carole Bayer-Sager, but this song never materialized.

== Release ==
The film was theatrically released in the United States on December 22, 1995, and international theaters on January 13, 1996, when it first premiered in Brazil. Its release was overshadowed by the release of Pixar's first feature film, Toy Story, which had premiered one month earlier.

=== Box office ===
The film ranked 15th on its opening weekend and earned $1.5 million from a total of 1,427 theaters. The film also ranked 7th among G-rated movies in 1995. Its total domestic gross was $11,348,324. Though a box office failure, it was much more successful in terms of video sales. These strong video sales led to the release of two direct-to-video sequels: Balto II: Wolf Quest and Balto III: Wings of Change being created, though neither sequel received as strong a reception as the original film.

=== Critical reception ===
Balto generally received mixed reviews from critics. On the review aggregator website Rotten Tomatoes, the film has an approval rating of 54% based on 24 reviews, with an average rating of 5.80/10. The website's critical consensus reads, "Balto is a well-meaning adventure with spirited animation, but mushy sentimentality and bland characterization keeps it at paw's length from more sophisticated family fare." The film received a "thumbs down" from Gene Siskel and a "thumbs up" from Roger Ebert in a 1996 episode of At the Movies. Siskel found the film to be a weak attempt at aping Lady and the Tramp, criticizing the animation style as "sketchy", and the story as "all over the map, from the rousing adventure, to the sweet and cloying scenes", whereas Ebert liked the film, stating that though it is not in the "category of the great animated film" and the animation not being as strong as that of Disney, it was "adequate", the story was "interesting", and the film was a "nice, little children's adventure movie about a brave dog".

Roger Ebert gave the film a three-out-of-four-star review, praising it as "a kids' movie, simply told, with lots of excitement and characters you can care about", and though he criticized Balto's refusal to fight Steele and stated that it compared poorly to Disney's output, he found it to be a satisfactory film in its own right. Paul Merrill of Empire Magazine gave the film three out of five stars, commending the film as "enchanting, highly enjoyable and impressively crafted, not least for its adventurous 'camera work'", and praised the voice cast, "barnstorming" chase sequences and lack of "cheesy songs to slow proceedings down". Nell Minow of Common Sense Media gave the film three out of five stars, calling it a "fun-but-tense fact-based film". Stephen Holden of The New York Times praised the film for "avoiding the mythological grandiosity and freneticism that afflict so many animated features these days", and "making modesty a virtue". Brian Lowry of Variety gave the film a more middling review, praising its pro-social messages and James Horner's "blaring" score, and finding the action sequences decent, but also criticized the humor as scant, and Balto himself as "rather blandly heroic".

On the negative side, Nick Bradshaw of Time Out criticized the film as a "half-hearted animated feature" that "rambles on" with "second-hand plotting and characterization", and criticized the animation style as "TV-standard". David Kronke of The Los Angeles Times criticized the film's historical inaccuracy and slow-paced premise establishment, criticized the animation as competent at best, and criticized the voice cast, stating that "even as voiced by [Kevin Bacon], Balto doesn't have the sort of charisma to get kids to truly root for him." Rita Kempley of The Washington Post gave the film a negative review, calling it a "mushy animated melodrama", criticizing its storyline as "prosaic" and "sappy", and unfavorably comparing the film to Toy Story, and Disney's other output, and its artistry to Dogs Playing Poker.

=== Home media ===
Balto was released on VHS and LaserDisc on April 2, 1996, by MCA/Universal Home Video in North America and CIC Video internationally. Balto was released on VHS and LaserDisc on April 2, 1996, by MCA/Universal Home Video in North America. The VHS version was made available once more on August 11, 1998, under the Universal Family Features label.

The film was released on DVD on February 19, 2002, which includes a game, Where is the Dog Sled Team?. This version was reprinted along with other Universal films such as An American Tail, An American Tail: Fievel Goes West, and The Land Before Time. It was initially released in widescreen on Blu-ray for the first time exclusively at Walmart retailers on April 4, 2017, before its wide release on July 4, 2017.

== Soundtrack ==
Balto

Soundtrack album by James Horner
- Released: December 5, 1995; October 29, 2018 (expansion)
- Recorded: July 1995
- Studios: Abbey Road Studios, London; Todd-AO Scoring Stage, Studio City (additional score; expansion only); Scrimshaw Sound, Nashville; Quad Studios Nashville; Skylab Studios, Nashville; Sixteenth Avenue Sound, Nashville
- Genres: Pop, modern classical, film score
- Length: 53:30 (original release); 78:55 (2018 expansion)
- Labels: MCA (1995); Intrada (2018)
- Producer: James Horner

James Horner chronology
Jumanji (1995)	Balto (1995)	The Spitfire Grill (1996)

Singles from Balto
- 1. "Reach for the Light" Released: December 4, 1995 (original release), October 29, 2018 (expansion)

Professional ratings
Review scores
Source	Rating
LetsSingIt	4/5 stars
Filmtracks	4/5 stars

Balto: Original Motion Picture Soundtrack contains the score for the film, composed and orchestrated by James Horner, and performed by the London Symphony Orchestra. The soundtrack was released on December 5, 1995, by MCA Records. It includes the film's only song, "Reach for the Light" performed by Steve Winwood. The original album release went out of print when MCA Records went out of business in 1997.

A limited edition expansion of the soundtrack album was released by Intrada Records on October 29, 2018. This release includes newly remastered versions of the tracks from the original release and previously unreleased material, and alternate tracks that were ultimately unused in the finished film.

== Awards ==
The film received four Annie Award nominations, including Best Animated Feature, and a Young Artist Award nomination, losing to Toy Story and A Pinky and the Brain Christmas, respectively.

List of awards and nominations
Award	Category	Nominee	Result
Annie Awards	Best Animated Feature	Balto	Nominated
Annie Awards	Best Individual Achievement: Producing	Steve Hickner	Nominated
Annie Awards	Best Individual Achievement: Production Design	Hans Bacher	Nominated
Annie Awards	Best Individual Achievement: Storyboarding	Rodolphe Guenoden	Nominated
Young Artist Award	Best Family Motion Picture - Musical or Comedy	Balto	Nominated

== Sequels ==
Two direct-to-video sequels that soon became a trilogy followed, made by Universal Cartoon Studios, with their animation done overseas by the Taiwanese studio Wang Film Productions, as Amblimation had gone out of business. Due to the sequels' significantly lower budgets and different production personnel, some lead roles were recast: Maurice LaMarche as Balto, Charles Fleischer as Boris, Jodi Benson as Jenna, and Kevin Schon as Muk and Luk. All other original characters were absent or had background roles. None of the sequels have historical references from the true story of Balto, nor have live-action sequences.

The first sequel, Balto II: Wolf Quest (also known as Balto: Wolf Quest), was released in 2002 and follows the adventures of one of Balto and Jenna's pups, Aleu, who sets off to discover her wolf heritage.

Balto III: Wings of Change (also known as Balto: Wings of Change) was released in 2004. The storyline follows the same litter of pups from Balto II, but focuses on another pup, Kodi, who is a member of a U.S. Mail dog sled delivery team, and is in danger of getting put out of his job by Duke, a pilot of a mail delivery bush plane, while Boris finds a mate named Stella.

== See also ==
- Togo
- White Fang (1991)
- Silver Fang
- All Dogs Go to Heaven
- Iron Will
- Kimba the White Lion
