= Michael Salter =

American conceptual artist

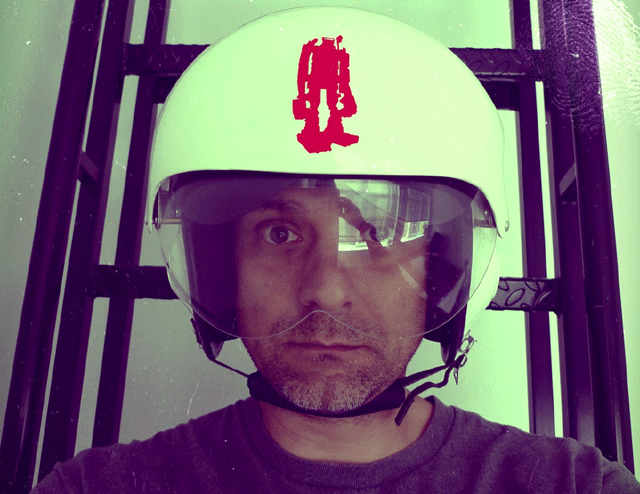
- Self-portrait, from the artist's collection
- Born: 1967 (age 58–59); Bristol, Connecticut, U.S.
- Education: Miami University (BFA); University of North Carolina, Chapel Hill (MFA)
- Known for: Conceptual art, installation art, painting, graphic design
- Notable work: Styrobot; If You Don't Buy It From Us, It's Not Our Problem too much Are You Sure; Informatics and the Styrobot Face-off; Visual Logistics
- Awards: North Carolina Arts Council 2005 Artist Fellowship Recipient

Michael Salter (born 1967) is an American contemporary artist and educator. Salter works in a variety of media, including drawing, painting, digital art, animation, kinetic sculpture, and sculptural assemblage. His work often references and subverts the visual language of corporate branding and graphic design, and reflects his desire to, in his words: "sort out the cacophony of visual noise in order to rethink meaning, motive, perception and narrative." His work has been described as postmodern, whimsical, quirky, unsettling, cryptic, and thought-provoking. Salter is perhaps best known for his giant Styrobots - a series of site-specific installations which rise ceiling-high to dominate their space.

== Career and early work ==
=== Education ===
Salter began college as a marketing major before narrowing his focus to the visual and creative aspect of design. He earned his BFA from Miami University, Oxford, Ohio, with to a double concentration in sculpture and graphic design. He received his MFA in studio art from the University of North Carolina at Chapel Hill.

=== Early work ===
After spending some time as a successful graphic designer, Salter became disillusioned with the consumer culture his work was contributing to. As a member of the artist collective Team Lump, in 1998 he began participating in Lump Gallery group shows, creating what one reviewer later described as "whimsical parodies of corporate logotypes and manufactured objects", using the language of institutional-style graphics to "spoof" them. Two years later, he displayed a photo series: discontinuous editing, which depicted uninhabited industrial landscapes. Both the "irrational" icons and the images of unpopulated urban or sub-urban landscapes would become recurring motifs in Salter's work, reemerging in three-dimensional and animated forms in Salter's later work.

== Later work ==
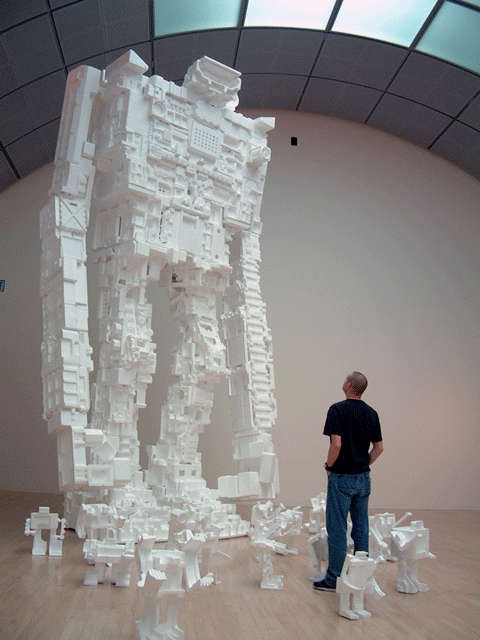
Artist Michael Salter contemplates his giant Styrobot at the San Jose Museum of Art.

=== Styrobots ===
Around 2003, inspired by their "mechanical" shapes, Salter began using pre-formed styrofoam packing materials to construct a six-foot tall robotic sculpture. Over time the Styrobots have grown with each successive show, expanding to fill their available space. The tallest Styrobot to date was created for a group show at the San Jose Museum of Art in 2008, "Robots: Evolution of a Cultural Icon". Rising to a height of 22 feet, the massive figure was surrounded by and appeared to be looking down at a number of smaller Styrobots at its feet. Later that year, a solo show at Rice University titled too much featured a Styrobot nearly as large in a much smaller space, crouched in a defeated position in the corner, surrounded on all sides by walls plastered with scores of images culled from Salter's collection of graphic icons.

=== Icons ===
From the beginning, Salter's gallery installations have included a variety of stylized images, often referred to as "icons", but perhaps more properly called pictograms. Executed in the simple, generic, black and white style of international signage, they seem at first familiar, yet their surrealistic content defies explanation. In the words of one reviewer, by parodying the near ubiquity of corporate logotypes and institutional style graphics, Salter "calls attention to what he calls the 'invisible fabric' of random, banal images and objects which threatens to smother us with its mind-numbing profusion."

=== Sculptures and kinetic sculptures ===
"The chair as a symbol of authority has literally been turned on its head," said critic Woody Holliman of Salter's circa 2000 work l'arc des'chaises, an "anti-heroic spectacle" of ten small plastic children's chairs bolted together in a semi-circle and flipped upside down. Two years later, the kinetic sculpture epilepsony featured recorded music with a vibrating figure on a tray under bright light. Pick Me A Winner, in 2008, literally embodied its title, as a motorized finger relentlessly aimed for a small molded nose. Disembodied appendages also feature in Finger Lickin' Good: a tiny kinetic sculpture in which "the pointed finger rotates on a single axis gently brushing against a tiny rubber tongue. The rubber tongue slightly bounces when it licks the finger, coming to a complete stop before lickin' again."

== Installations ==
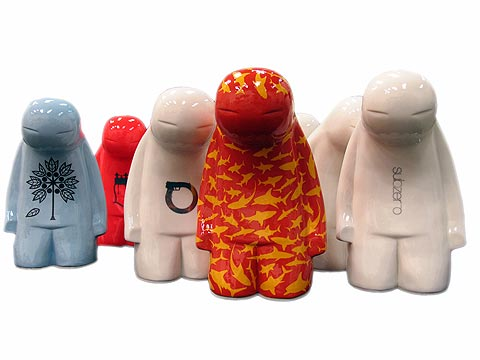
Subzer-o

=== Jeff Bailey Gallery ===
Salter has exhibited works in solo and group shows nationally and internationally. His 2008 show at the Jeff Bailey Gallery in New York was reviewed in the October issue of Art in America that year. The show, entitled Are You Sure, featured a variety of elements from his ouvre, including the fourteen foot tall Styrobot, a series of digital C-prints titled Situations Unknown depicting empty suburban landscapes containing a single improbable element, and a collection of porcelain figurines dubbed Subzer-o: a series of static humanoid figures, each branded with its own logo, packaging, and text describing its particular depressing attributes.

=== BLK/MRKT Gallery ===
Informatics and The Styrobot Face Off, an installation at BLK/MRKT Gallery in 2006, included a central space filled with two opposing Styrobots mirroring each other's aggressive posturing. Grouped around these oversize figures were a number of smaller works in a variety of media: lighted panels displaying Salter's "spoofs" on graphic design and corporate logotypes, a shelf of colorful toylike monsters in tubes, two imploded oil cans covered with glossy paint and appliqués, a series of images depicting surreal suburban environs, small sharks apparently swimming into a wall, and the kinetic sculpture Finger Lickin' Good. This piece and the appropriated oil cans would reappear the next year in the group show Introduction, the inaugural exhibition of the think.21 gallery in Brussels, Belgium.

=== think.21 Contemporary Gallery ===
In 2009, Salter would install a solo show at think.21, If You Don't Buy It From Us, It's Not Our Problem which included a pensive looking seated Styrobot and the "absurd" figure of a giant singing yellow banana whose pants had fallen to his ankles.

=== New Britain Museum of American Art ===
For his solo show as the New Britain Museum of American Art featured "New/Now" artist in 2012, Salter displayed commercial-like signage with ominous undertones, an oversize graphic image of a delicate hand pinching a denuded flower, small chimera-like sculptures made of toy figurines, and two Icon-o-lots - panels covered with what one reviewer characterized as "subversive glyphs that seem to exist just beyond one's ability to perceive them."

== Collaborations ==
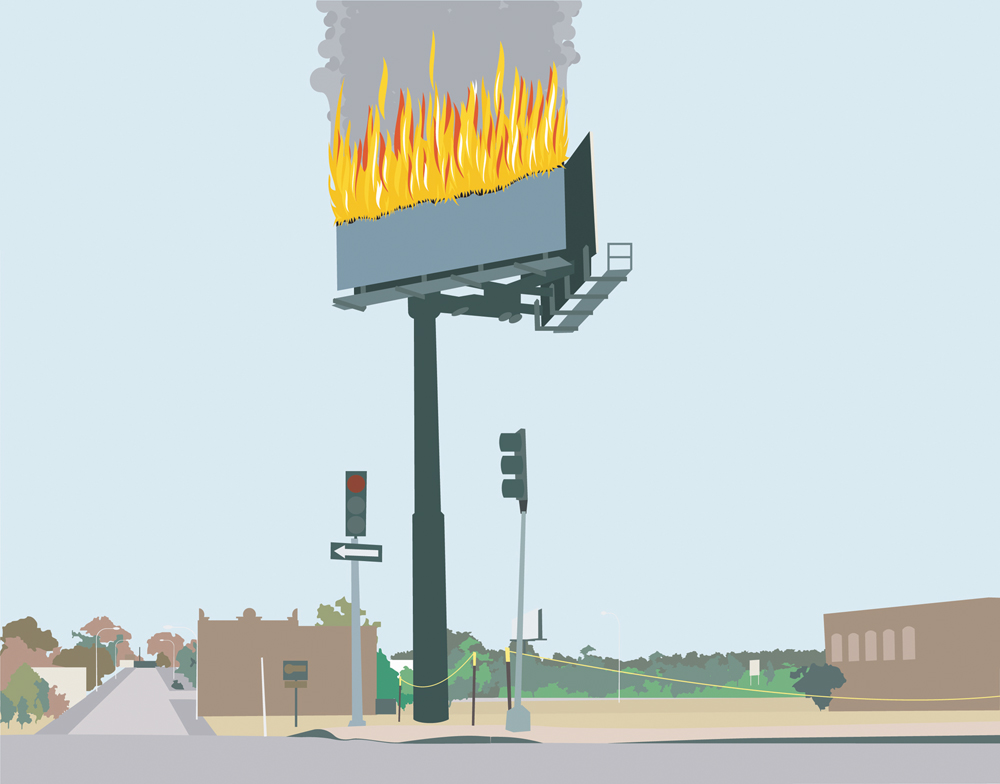
Burning Billboard (from the Situations Unknown series), 2007, digital C-print, ed. 3, 22" x 28".

Salter has collaborated with the artist Chris Coleman on a series of animations called My House is not My House (2008-2010). Based on Salter's Situations Unknown illustrations, with animation and incidental sounds added by Coleman, each five-minute loop depicts a view of a seemingly unoccupied suburban home, where, as Coleman says: "time passes and nothing seems to change." The four high definition "digital paintings" were commissioned in 2011 for the opening of the Lithium Project Art Gallery in Napoli, Italy.

From the beginning of his career, Salter has both benefited from and contributed to the success of Team Lump, an artist collective collaborating since at least the late 1990s. An outgrowth of the Raleigh, North Carolina project space Lump, founded by Bill Thelen, Team Lump and the Lump Gallery is an alternative art space which showcases conceptual and challenging work by emerging artists from all disciplines.

== Motifs ==
Salter's work is characterized by a response to and a subversion of consumer culture, the ubiquity of corporate branding, and the banality of urban and suburban landscapes. His installations often feature disorienting shifts in scale and surrealistic elements - improbable content that defies literal interpretation. Chairs were a recurring motif in Salter's early work, and sharks sometimes surface. The giant Styrobots continue to command attention, and over time have evolved (or devolved) in form. In a 2012 show at the Jordan Schnitzer Museum of Art, two of Salter's recurring motifs combined in ANDY: Autonomous Nautical Deepwater stYrobot- a twenty foot long Styroshark. "Sharks sort of exist in pop culture to a level of invisibility," he said. "My gut reaction is always to go to that invisible, saturated level."

The artist is also known to have a fondness for puns.

== Artist's philosophy ==
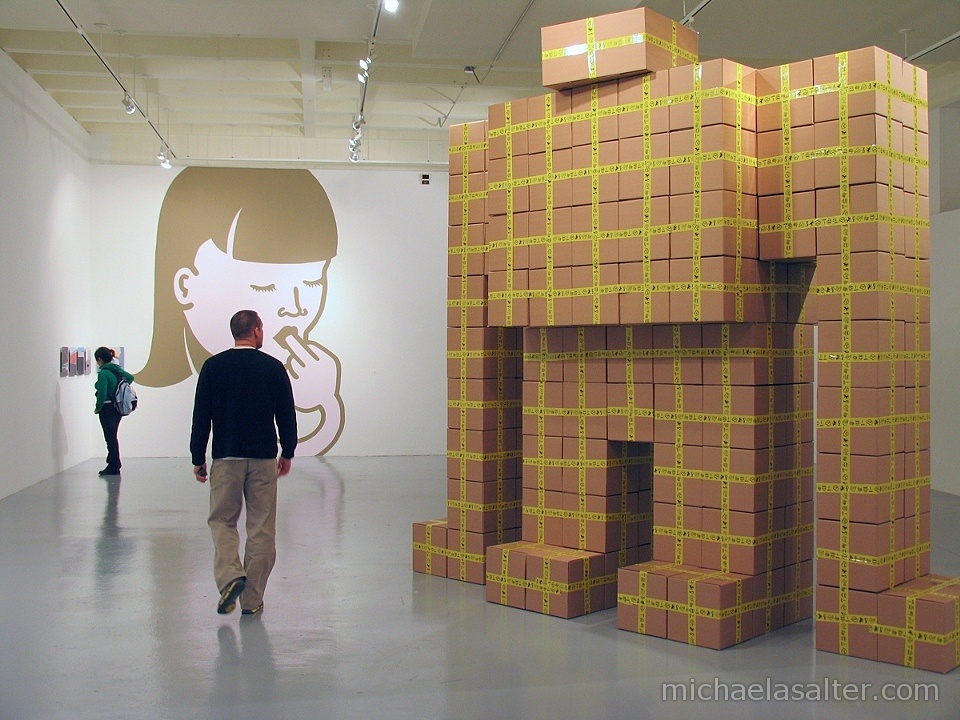
Visual Logistics at the University of Texas, Arlington, January 2006.

I love this kind of twisted narrative in the real world, and it's everywhere, it's just absolutely everywhere- from the bread on the shelf, to the shoes we wear and the clothes...Our current visual culture, I think, is just an absolute mess. I don't propose there's any cure for it, I just propose that maybe I can find some sort of peace with it if I go out there, I sort of throw a net through all of what I see, and I come back to my studio and re-synthesize this- and then I bring it back and deliver it again.

— Michael Salter

I have a long history of using whatever is around...And it can be confused with being sort of the champion recycling guy and I'm not. I just use what's around. And I think that's actually a better idea of sustainability in the end.

— Michael Salter, an interview to The Register-Guard

The artist seems to be making a comment about the power of branding in our lives...At the opening to his show...someone thought they recognized the umbrella in one of his works. According to Melissa Nardiello, NBMAA marketing and design manager, "They said 'Ah, you're influenced by Travelers insurance' and he said, 'No, you are influenced by Travelers because you see that, where I just see an umbrella.'

—

My work is an attempt to slow down, sort out, and focus information. The seemingly simple, runs away from me so fast, and leaves a cloud of dust so thick, I have to stop and wipe my eyes.

—

== Critical response ==
Salter seems to toy with the replicable quality of a culture represented by freshly designed or appropriated images.

— Edward Leffingwell (2008)

Salter's cryptic paintings and installations had a detached quality-cool, precise, seemingly mechanically produced. They were also very compelling and often strikingly funny but with a dark sense of humor.

— Linda Johnson Dougherty (2002)

One might compare Salter's icons to the work of Matt Mullican, who has his own cryptic vocabulary of symbols. But I prefer to think of Salter as a kind of postmodern René Magritte, mocking our smug attempts to reduce complex human reality to a simple, black and white stereotype.

— Woody Holliman (1998)
