= Carlos Grangel =

Spanish character designer for animated films

- Born: Barcelona, Spain

Carlos Grangel is a Spanish character designer for animated films.

== Career ==
He started out as a comic book artist, drawing Fix und Foxi for the German market from the mid-80s to 1994 and Disney comics (Brer Rabbit) for the Dutch market in 1994/95. Afterwards he moved to DreamWorks Animation, where his credits include The Road to El Dorado (2000), Spirit: Stallion of the Cimarron (2002), Shark Tale (2004) and Madagascar (2005). He also worked on Tim Burton's Corpse Bride (2005).

He owns Grangel Studios along with his brother Jordi.

== Filmography ==
- We're Back! A Dinosaur's Story (1993)
- Balto (1995)
- The Fearless Four (1997)
- The Prince of Egypt (1998)
- Periwig Maker (1999)
- The Road to El Dorado (2000)
- Joseph: King of Dreams (2000)
- Spirit: Stallion of the Cimarron (2002)
- Sinbad: Legend of the Seven Seas (2003)
- Till Eulenspiegel (2003)
- Shark Tale (2004)
- Madagascar (2005)
- Corpse Bride (2005)
- Hui Buh (2006)
- The Pirates! In an Adventure with Scientists! (2012)
- Hotel Transylvania (2012)
- Ron's Gone Wrong (2021)

== Recognition ==
- 2003, won Annie Award for 'Individual Achievement in Character Design' for Spirit: Stallion of the Cimarron (2002).
- 2005, nominated for Annie Award for 'Character Design in an Animated Feature Production' for Shark Tale (2004)
- 2006, nominated for Annie Award for 'Best Character Design in an Animated Feature Production' for Corpse Bride (2005)
