= Nico Marlet =

American animator

Nicolas "Nico" Marlet (born 1969, Figeac) is a French-American animator and character designer employed by DreamWorks Animation. He has won four Annie Awards.

He is best known for his character design work on films in the Kung Fu Panda and How to Train Your Dragon franchises, as well as Disney television shows such as TaleSpin and DuckTales. He also worked on an unproduced animated version of Andrew Lloyd Webber's Cats at DreamWorks' predecessor studio, Amblimation. His work has appeared in several "art of" books, including The Art of Kung Fu Panda, The Art of How to Train Your Dragon, The Art of Bee Movie, and his own limited edition sketchbook containing some of his personal works.

== Animation credits ==
- DuckTales the Movie: Treasure of the Lost Lamp (animator) – 1990
- TaleSpin – Plunder & Lightning (animator) – 1990
- We're Back! A Dinosaur's Story (animator) – 1993
- Balto (character designer, supervising animator: "Muk and Luk") – 1995
- The Prince of Egypt (character designer) – 1998
- The Road to El Dorado (character designer, supervising animator: "Armadillo") – 2000
- Monsters, Inc. (visual development) – 2001
- Sinbad: Legend of the Seven Seas (character designer) – 2003
- Madagascar (additional character designer) – 2005
- Over the Hedge (character designer) – 2006
- Bee Movie (character designer) – 2007
- French Roast (character designer) – 2008
- Kung Fu Panda (character designer) – 2008
- Kung Fu Panda: Secrets of the Furious Five (character designer) – 2008
- How to Train Your Dragon (character designer) – 2010
- Kung Fu Panda Holiday Special (character designer) – 2010
- Kung Fu Panda 2 (character designer) – 2011
- Book of Dragons (character designer) – 2011
- Dragons: Riders of Berk (character designer for 1 episode) – We Are a Family Part II – 2013
- How to Train Your Dragon 2 (character designer) – 2014
- Mune: Guardian of the Moon (character designer & production designer) – 2014
- Kung Fu Panda 3 (character designer) – 2016
- How to Train Your Dragon: The Hidden World (character designer) – 2019
- Abominable (character designer) – 2019
