= The Prince of Egypt =

1998 film produced by DreamWorks Animation

- Theatrical release poster
- Directed by: Brenda Chapman; Steve Hickner; Simon Wells
- Written by: Philip LaZebnik
- Based on: Book of Exodus
- Produced by: Penney Finkelman Cox; Sandra Rabins
- Starring: Val Kilmer; Ralph Fiennes; Michelle Pfeiffer; Sandra Bullock; Jeff Goldblum; Danny Glover; Patrick Stewart; Helen Mirren; Steve Martin; Martin Short
- Edited by: Nick Fletcher
- Music by: Hans Zimmer
- Production companies: DreamWorks Pictures; DreamWorks Animation
- Distributed by: DreamWorks Distribution (Note: In July 2014, the film's distribution rights were purchased by DreamWorks Animation from Paramount Pictures (owners of the pre-2005 DreamWorks Pictures catalog) and transferred to 20th Century Fox before reverting to Universal Pictures in 2018 following NBCUniversal's acquisition of DreamWorks Animation in 2016.)
- Release dates: December 16, 1998 (Royce Hall); December 18, 1998 (United States)
- Running time: 99 minutes
- Country: United States
- Language: English
- Budget: $60–100 million
- Box office: $218 million

The Prince of Egypt is a 1998 American animated musical drama film directed by Brenda Chapman, Steve Hickner, and Simon Wells, and written by Philip LaZebnik. It is the first traditionally animated film from DreamWorks Animation, and the first to be animated entirely in-house at DWA Glendale after Amblimation was closed in 1997. The film is an adaptation of the Book of Exodus and follows the life of Moses from being a prince of Egypt to a prophet chosen by God to carry out his ultimate destiny of leading the Hebrews out of Egypt. It features songs written by Stephen Schwartz and a score composed by Hans Zimmer. The film stars the voices of Val Kilmer, Ralph Fiennes, Michelle Pfeiffer, Sandra Bullock, Jeff Goldblum, Danny Glover, Patrick Stewart, Helen Mirren, Steve Martin, and Martin Short.

DreamWorks co-founder and CEO Jeffrey Katzenberg had frequently suggested an animated adaptation of the 1956 film The Ten Commandments while working for The Walt Disney Company, and he decided to put the idea into production after leaving Disney and co-founding DreamWorks Pictures in 1994. To make the project, DreamWorks employed artists who had worked for Walt Disney Feature Animation and Amblimation, totaling a crew of 350 people from 34 countries. The film has a blend of traditional animation and computer-generated imagery, created using software from Toon Boom Technologies and Silicon Graphics.

The Prince of Egypt premiered at Royce Hall in Los Angeles on December 16, 1998, and was released in theaters on December 18, followed by a release on home video on September 14, 1999. Reviews were generally positive; critics particularly praised the visuals, songs, score, and voice acting. The film grossed $218 million worldwide in theaters, which made it the most successful non-Disney animated feature at the time. The film's success led to the direct-to-video prequel Joseph: King of Dreams (2000), and a stage musical adaptation which opened in London's West End in 2020.

The song "When You Believe" became a commercially successful single in a pop version performed by Whitney Houston and Mariah Carey. The song won Best Original Song at the 71st Academy Awards, making The Prince of Egypt the first animated film independently outside of Disney and Pixar films, as well as the first DreamWorks Animation film, to receive Academy Awards, succeeded by Shrek (2001) and Wallace & Gromit: The Curse of the Were-Rabbit (2005). The film also won the inaugural Critics' Choice Movie Award for Best Animated Feature, in a tie with Pixar's A Bug's Life. In the decades since its release, The Prince of Egypt has been widely acclaimed and regarded as one of DreamWorks's best films and one of the greatest animated films of all time.

== Plot ==
In Ancient Egypt, the enslaved Hebrew people pray to God for deliverance. Pharaoh Seti, fearing that the growing numbers of Hebrews could lead to rebellion, orders a mass infanticide of all newborn Hebrew boys. Yocheved and her children, Miriam and Aaron, rush to the Nile River, where she places her newborn son in a basket on the water, bidding him farewell with a final lullaby. Miriam follows the basket as it floats to Seti's palace. She witnesses her brother safely adopted by Seti's wife, Queen Tuya, who names him Moses. Before leaving, Miriam prays that Moses will return to free the Hebrews.

Years later, Moses and his adoptive brother Rameses, heir to the throne of Egypt, are scolded by Seti for accidentally destroying a temple. After Moses suggests that Rameses be given the opportunity to prove his responsibility, Seti names Rameses prince regent. High priests Hotep and Huy offer Rameses a beautiful but rebellious young Midianite woman, Tzipporah. Moses humiliates Tzipporah, disappointing Tuya. Rameses offers Tzipporah to Moses and appoints him Royal Chief Architect.

Later that night, Tzipporah escapes the palace; Moses follows, choosing not to stop her. He runs into the now-adult Miriam and Aaron, whom he does not recognize. He disbelieves Miriam's claims that they are family and almost has them arrested until Miriam sings their mother's lullaby, triggering Moses's memory. He flees in denial, but learns the truth of Seti's genocide from a nightmare, then from Seti himself, who disturbs Moses by claiming the Hebrews were "only slaves". The next day, Moses stops an Egyptian slave driver from flogging an elderly Hebrew slave, accidentally pushing the slave driver to his death. Horrified and ashamed, Moses flees into the desert in exile, despite Rameses's pleas that he stay.

Arriving at an oasis, Moses defends three girls from brigands, only to learn their older sister is Tzipporah. Moses is welcomed by Jethro, Tzipporah's father and the high priest of Midian, who helps Moses gain a more positive outlook on life. Moses becomes a shepherd, falls in love with Tzipporah, marries her, and adjusts to life in Midian. Moses discovers a burning bush, through which God tells him to return to Egypt and free the Hebrews. God bestows Moses's shepherding staff with his power and promises that he will tell Moses what to say. When Moses tells Tzipporah of his task, she decides to join him.

Arriving in Egypt, Moses is happily greeted by Rameses, who is now Pharaoh with a wife and son. Moses demands the Hebrews' release and transforms his staff into a snake to demonstrate God's power. Hotep and Huy deceptively recreate this transformation, only to have their snakes eaten by Moses's. Not wanting to have his actions cause the empire's collapse and feeling betrayed by Moses, Rameses denies Moses's demand and doubles the Hebrews' workload.

The Hebrews, including Aaron, blame Moses for their increased workload, discouraging Moses, but Miriam inspires Moses to persevere. Moses casts the first of the Ten Plagues of Egypt by changing the waters of the Nile into blood, but Rameses remains unmoved. God inflicts eight more plagues onto Egypt (frogs, lice, flies, livestock pestilence, boils, hailfire, locusts, and prolonged darkness), but still Rameses refuses to relent, vowing never to release the Hebrews. Disheartened, Moses prepares the Hebrews for the tenth plague, instructing them to sacrifice a lamb and mark their doorposts with its blood. That night, the final plague kills all the firstborn sons of Egypt, including Rameses's young son, while passing over the Hebrews' marked homes. Grief-stricken, Rameses permits the Hebrews to leave. After leaving the palace, Moses collapses in anguish and remorse.

The following morning, Moses, Miriam, Aaron and Tzipporah lead the Hebrews out of Egypt. Once at the Red Sea, a vengeful Rameses pursues them with his army, intent on killing them. However, a pillar of fire blocks the army's way, while Moses uses his staff to part the sea. The Hebrews cross the open sea bottom; the fire vanishes and the army gives chase, but the sea closes over and drowns the Egyptian soldiers, sparing Rameses alone. Moses mournfully bids Rameses farewell and leads the Hebrews to Mount Sinai, where he receives the Ten Commandments.

== Voice cast ==
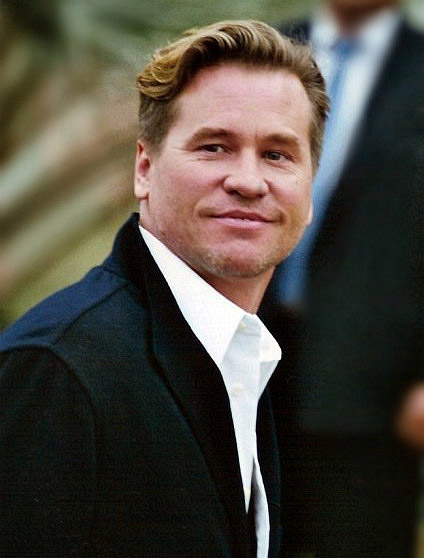
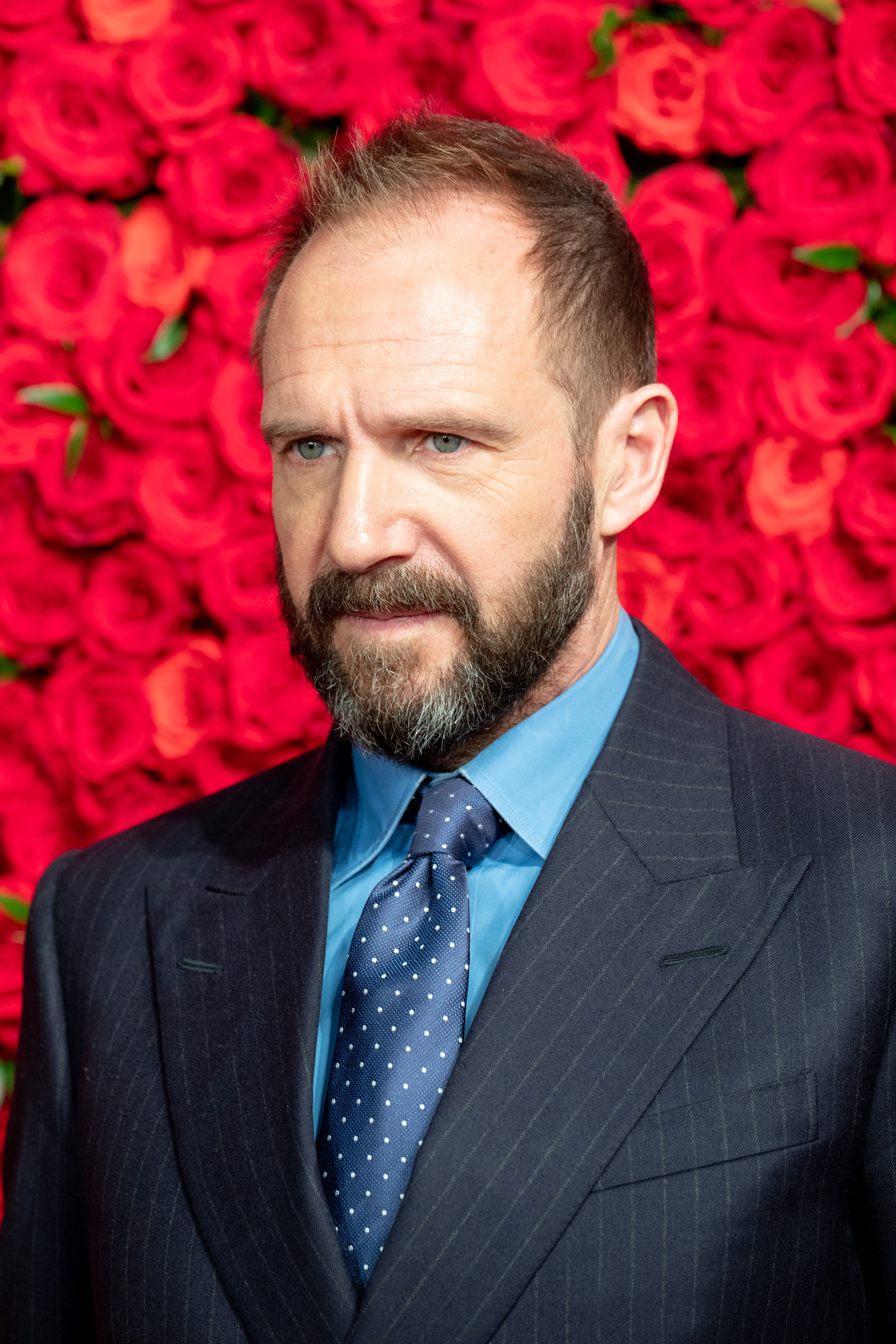
Val Kilmer (left) and Ralph Fiennes (right), the voices of Moses and Rameses respectively.
- Val Kilmer as Moses, a Hebrew who was adopted and raised as a prince by the Egyptian royal family
  - Kilmer also provides the uncredited voice of God
  - Amick Byram provides Moses's singing voice
- Ralph Fiennes as Rameses, Moses's adoptive brother and eventual successor to Seti
- Michelle Pfeiffer as Tzipporah, Jethro's oldest daughter and Moses's wife
- Sandra Bullock as Miriam, Aaron's sister and Moses's biological sister
  - Sally Dworsky provides Miriam's singing voice
  - Eden Riegel provides the voice of a younger Miriam
- Jeff Goldblum as Aaron, Miriam's brother and Moses's biological brother
- Danny Glover as Jethro, Tzipporah's father and Midian's high priest
  - Brian Stokes Mitchell provides Jethro's singing voice
- Patrick Stewart as Pharaoh Seti, Rameses's father and Moses's adoptive father, the Pharaoh at the beginning of the film
- Helen Mirren as Queen Tuya, Seti's wife, Rameses's mother, and Moses's adoptive mother
  - Linda Dee Shayne provides Tuya's singing voice
- Steve Martin as Hotep, one of the high priests who serves as an advisor to Seti, and later Rameses.
- Martin Short as Huy, Hotep's fellow high priest.
- Ofra Haza as Yocheved, Miriam and Aaron's mother and Moses's biological mother. She sang her character's number, "Deliver Us", in English and 17 other languages for the film's dubbing.
- Bobby Motown as Amun, Rameses's son
- Francesca Marie Smith as Ephorah, Jethro's second daughter
- Stephanie Sawyer as Ajolidoforah, Jethro's third daughter
- Aria Curzon as Jethrodiadah, Jethro's youngest daughter
- James Avery as Kahma, the cruel overseer of Seti I's construction works

Director Brenda Chapman briefly voices Miriam when she sings the lullaby to Moses. The vocals had been recorded for a scratch audio track, which was intended to be replaced later by Dworsky. The track turned out so well that it remained in the film.

== Production ==
=== Development ===
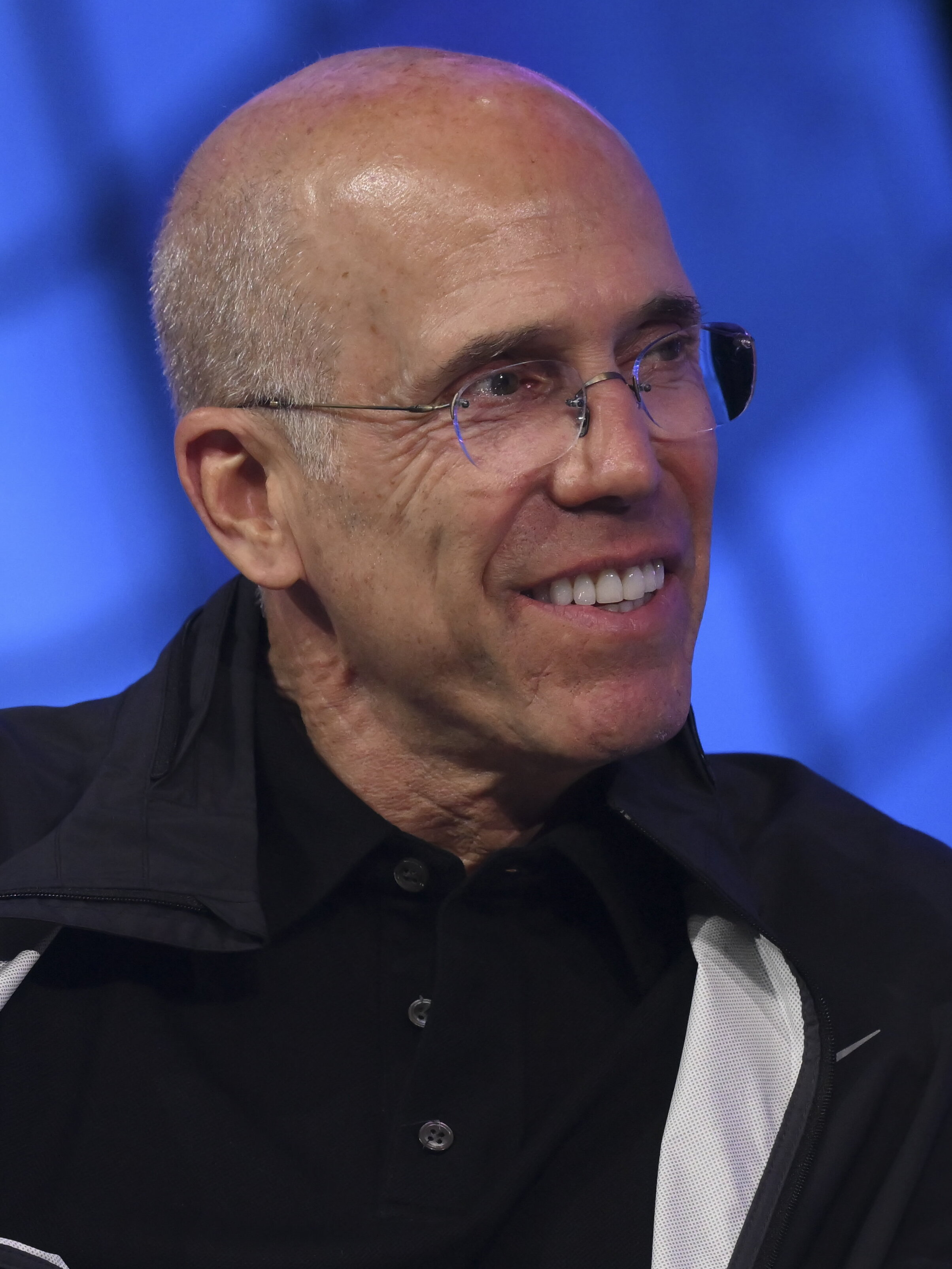
The film was a passion project for executive producer Jeffrey Katzenberg, who brought the project to the newly-formed DreamWorks Pictures.

Former Walt Disney Studios chairman Jeffrey Katzenberg had always wanted to produce a film adaptation of the life of Moses. Katzenberg once stated, "It was the project I was pushing for us to make, because it's so different for an animated feature. This is an idea I had to do while I was still working for Disney." In April 1994, Disney Studios president Frank Wells was killed in a helicopter crash. Katzenberg had assumed that Michael Eisner would appoint him as Wells's successor, but he refused. (In 1995, Eisner instead hired Michael Ovitz to fill the position). In August 1994, Eisner called Katzenberg into his office and handed him a four-page memorandum about impending staffing changes, which included Katzenberg's immediate resignation. Katzenberg resigned on August 23, though he remained at Disney until September 1994.

The idea for The Prince of Egypt was discussed at the formation of DreamWorks Pictures on October 12, 1994, when Katzenberg's partners, Amblin Entertainment founder Steven Spielberg and music producer David Geffen, were meeting in Spielberg's living room. Katzenberg had wanted to tackle "bigger-than-life stories", like Indiana Jones and the Temple of Doom, The Terminator (both 1984) and Lawrence of Arabia (1962). Katzenberg recalls that Spielberg looked at him during the meeting and said, "You ought to do The Ten Commandments".

The Prince of Egypt was "written" throughout the story process. Beginning with a starting outline, story supervisors Kelly Asbury and Lorna Cook led a team of fourteen storyboard artists and writers as they sketched out the entire film—sequence by sequence. Once the storyboards were approved, they were put into the Avid Media Composer digital editing system by editor Nick Fletcher to create a "story reel" or animatic. The story reel allowed the filmmakers to view and edit the entire film in continuity before production began, and also helped the layout and animation departments understand what is happening in each sequence of the film.

After casting of the voice talent concluded, dialogue recording sessions began. For the film, the actors recorded individually in a studio under guidance by one of the three directors. The voice tracks were to become the primary aspect as to which the animators built their performances. Because DreamWorks was concerned about theological accuracy, Katzenberg decided to call in Biblical scholars, Christian, Jewish, and Muslim theologians, and Arab American leaders to help his film be more accurate and faithful to the original story. After previewing the developing film, all these leaders noted that the studio executives listened and responded to their ideas, and praised the studio for reaching out for comment from outside sources.

=== Animation and design ===
Art directors Kathy Altieri and Richard Chavez and production designer Darek Gogol led a team of nine visual development artists in setting a visual style for the film that was representative of the time, the scale and the architectural style of Ancient Egypt. Part of the process also included the research and collection of artwork from various artists, as well as taking part in trips such as a two-week journey across Egypt by the filmmakers in December 1995, before the film's production began. The film's look was inspired by Claude Monet (backgrounds) and David Lean (composition).

A promotional image of the characters from the film. From left to right: Aaron, Miriam, Tzipporah, Moses, Rameses, Hotep, Huy, Pharaoh Seti and Queen Tuya.

Character designers Carter Goodrich, Carlos Grangel and Nico Marlet worked on setting the design and overall look of the characters. Drawing on various inspirations for the widely known characters, the team of character designers worked on designs that had a more realistic feel than the usual animated characters up to that time. Both character design and art direction worked to set a definite distinction between the symmetrical, more angular look of the Egyptians versus the more organic, natural look of the Hebrews and their related environments. The backgrounds department, headed by supervisors Paul Lasaine and Ron Lukas, oversaw a team of artists who were responsible for painting the sets/backdrops from the layouts. Within the film, approximately 934 hand-painted backgrounds were created. While Katzenberg took the rest of the crew members to Egypt, the background supervisors visited Death Valley, California to study the colors, textures and landscapes.

The animation team for The Prince of Egypt, including 350 artists from 34 different nations, was primarily recruited both from Walt Disney Feature Animation, which had fallen under Katzenberg's auspices while at the Walt Disney Company, and from Amblimation, a defunct division of Spielberg's Amblin Entertainment. As at Disney's, character animators were grouped into teams by character: for example, Kristof Serrand, as the supervising animator of Older Moses, set the acting style of the character and assigned scenes to his team. Consideration was given to depicting the ethnicities of the ancient Egyptians, Hebrews, and Nubians properly. The filmmakers initially worked out of Amblin Entertainment's main offices on the Universal Studios Lot, but quickly outgrew them. In March 1995, as a temporary solution to accommodate increases in crew members, the studio was moved into the Lakeside Plaza facility, nearby on the lot. As animation increased at the Lakeside building, in June 1996, construction of DreamWorks' new animation studio in Glendale, California began, under Katzenberg's supervision.

There are 1,192 scenes in the film, and 1,180 contain work done by the special effects department, which animated everything in a scene that is not a character, such as blowing wind, dust, rainwater, and shadows. A blend of traditional animation and computer-generated imagery was used in the depictions of the ten plagues of Egypt and the parting of the Red Sea. The Red Sea scene was animated by twelve people and took three years to complete. The characters were animated with the digital paint software Animo by Cambridge Animation (now merged with Toon Boom Technologies), and the compositing of the 2D and 3D elements was done using the "Exposure Tool", a digital solution developed for Alias Research by Silicon Graphics. Additional final line animation was outsourced to Bardel Entertainment, Fox Animation Studios and Heart of Texas Productions.

=== Creating the voice of God ===
The task of creating God's voice was given to Lon Bender and the team working with the film's music composer, Hans Zimmer. According to Bender: "The challenge with that voice was to try to evolve it into something that had not been heard before. We did a lot of research into the voices that had been used for past Hollywood movies as well as for radio shows, and we were trying to create something that had never been previously heard not only from a casting standpoint but from a voice manipulation standpoint as well." It was decided that the voice of God would be provided by Val Kilmer, who portrayed Moses in the film, in order to indicate that God was communicating with Moses via the voice he would otherwise perceive in his mind, as opposed to the "larger-than-life tones" used to portray God in previous theatrical releases.

== Music ==
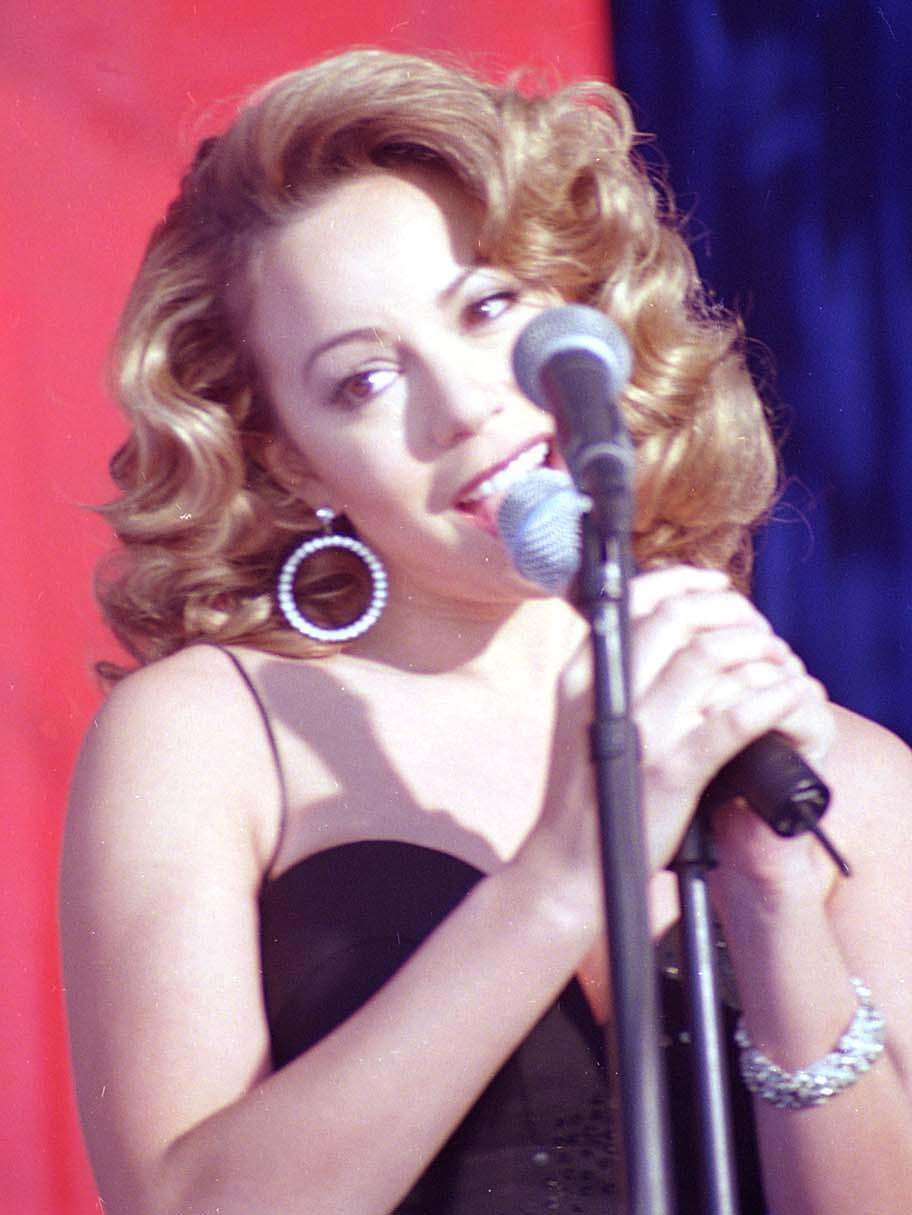
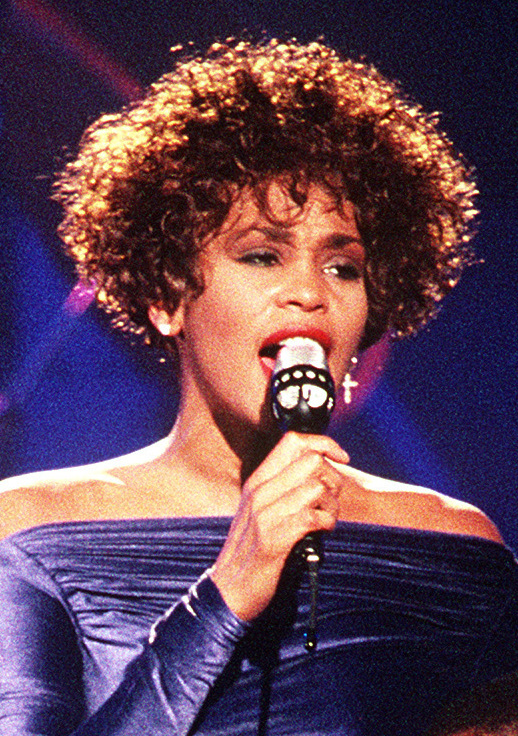
Mariah Carey (left) and Whitney Houston (right) were praised for their vocal contributions to "When You Believe".

Composer and lyricist Stephen Schwartz began working on writing songs for the film from the beginning of its production. As the story evolved, he continued to write songs that would serve both to entertain and help move the story along. Composer Hans Zimmer arranged and produced the songs and then eventually wrote the film's score. The film's score was recorded entirely in London.

DreamWorks Records released three soundtrack albums simultaneously for The Prince of Egypt, each of them aimed towards a different target audience. While the other two accompanying records, the country-themed "Nashville" soundtrack and the gospel-based "Inspirational" soundtrack, functioned as film tributes, the official The Prince of Egypt soundtrack contained the actual songs from the film. This album combines elements from the score composed by Hans Zimmer and film songs by Stephen Schwartz. The songs were either voiced over by professional singers, such as Salisbury Cathedral Choir, or sung by the film's voice actors, such as Michelle Pfeiffer and Ofra Haza. Various tracks by contemporary artists such as Amy Grant, K-Ci & JoJo, and Boyz II Men were added, including the Mariah Carey and Whitney Houston duet "When You Believe", a Babyface rewrite of the original Schwartz composition, sung by Michelle Pfeiffer and Sally Dworsky in the film.

== Release ==
The Prince of Egypt had its premiere at UCLA's Royce Hall on December 16, 1998, with its wide release occurring two days later. Despite being the inaugural production by DreamWorks Animation, it wound up the second to get a theatrical release, as Antz was rushed to reach theatres in October. The international release occurred simultaneously with that of the United States, as according to DreamWorks' distribution chief Jim Tharp, opening one week prior to the "global holiday" of Christmas, audiences all over the world would be available at the same time.

The accompanying marketing campaign was aimed to appeal to adults, who at the time were perceived as being averse to animated films. Merchandising was limited to a line of collectable figures and books. Walmart served as a promotional partner and offered in stores a package featuring two tickets to The Prince of Egypt, a storybook and the film's soundtrack. Burger King promotions were scrapped as both DreamWorks and Burger King felt it would be a "terrible disservice" to push any kind of merchandise that would trivialize the film. The Prince of Egypt: Classic Edition storybook, published by Dutton Children's Books in 1998, was written by Jane Yolen and illustrated by Michael Koelsch. Koelsch received an honorable mention from the Society of Illustrators for this book's illustrations.

A 4K restoration of the film, remastered from the original 35mm camera negative under the supervision of the film's directors, premiered at the Annecy International Animation Film Festival in June 2018, to commemorate the film's 20th anniversary.

=== Home media ===
The Prince of Egypt was released on DVD, VHS, and LaserDisc in the United States on September 14, 1999. It was released worldwide over a two-month period, the fastest global rollout for a home media release at the time. The ownership of the film was assumed by DreamWorks Animation (DWA) when that company split from DreamWorks Pictures in 2004; as of July 2018, the rights to the film are now owned by Universal Pictures via its parent company NBCUniversal's acquisition of DWA. A Blu-ray of the film was released on October 16, 2018, by Universal Pictures Home Entertainment. For the 25th anniversary of the film, a 4K Blu-ray utilizing the remastered print from the 2018 Annecy Film Festival screening, was released on March 14, 2023, and grossed $58,803, but every release of the film on home media prior to the 4K Blu-ray used a 35mm interpositive print of the film, rather than using the original files to encode the film directly to digital.

== Reception ==
=== Box office ===
The Prince of Egypt grossed $101 million in the United States and Canada, and $117 million in other territories, for a worldwide total of $218 million.

In its opening weekend, the film grossed $14.5 million (a $4,658 average) from 3,118 theaters, finishing second place at the box office, behind You've Got Mail. The opening was seen as somewhat disappointing given the film's high production and promotional costs, and the studio's faith in the project; industry insiders also had doubts it could leg out to $100 million domestically. Due to the holiday season, the film gained 4% in its second weekend, earning $15.1 million and finishing in fourth place. It would hold well in its third weekend, with only a 25% drop to $11.2 million for a $3,511 average from 3,202 theaters and once again finishing in fourth place.

=== Critical response ===
On the review aggregator website Rotten Tomatoes, 79% of 92 critics' reviews are positive, with an average rating of 7.8/10. The website's consensus reads: "The Prince of Egypt's stunning visuals and first-rate voice cast more than compensate for the fact that it's better crafted than it is emotionally involving." Metacritic, which uses a weighted average, assigned the film a score of 64 out of 100 based on 26 critics, indicating "generally favorable reviews". Audiences polled by CinemaScore gave the film an average grade of "A" on an A+ to F scale.

Roger Ebert of the Chicago Sun-Times wrote that "The Prince of Egypt is one of the best-looking animated films ever made. It employs computer-generated animation as an aid to traditional techniques, rather than as a substitute for them, and we sense the touch of human artists in the vision behind the Egyptian monuments, the lonely desert vistas, the thrill of the chariot race, the personalities of the characters. This is a film that shows animation growing up and embracing more complex themes, instead of chaining itself in the category of children's entertainment".

MovieGuide also reviewed The Prince of Egypt favorably, saying that it took animated films to a new level of entertainment, and that the "magnificent" art, music, story, and realization make it "one of the most entertaining masterpieces of all time".

Stephen Hunter from The Washington Post wrote that "the movie's proudest accomplishment is that it revises our version of Moses toward something more immediate and believable, more humanly knowable".

Lisa Alspector from the Chicago Reader wrote: "The blend of animation techniques somehow demonstrates mastery modestly, while the special effects are nothing short of magnificent."

Jeff Millar from The Houston Chronicle praised the animation and called the film "an amalgam of Hollywood biblical epic, Broadway supermusical and nice Sunday school lesson".

James Berardinelli from Reelviews described the animation as "top-notch" and able to match Disney films in that regard.

Liam Lacey of The Globe and Mail gave a negative review, writing that it is spectacular, but it takes itself too seriously. Richard Corliss of Time magazine also disliked the film, saying that it lacks creativity and joy.

=== Retrospective reception ===
Since its release, the film continues to receive acclaim from critics. When the film reached its 20th anniversary, SyFy made a retrospective review of The Prince of Egypt, calling it the greatest animated film of all time, predominantly due to its voice cast, animation, characters, cinematography, and most importantly, its musical score. Lisa Laman of Collider wrote that it "stands out" among the other films in DreamWorks Animation's catalog for its dark but inspirational and uplifting tone when compared to the studio's later titles. Laman further noted that the film is "content to let these kinds of dark moments simmer. Sadness is allowed to wash over the audience rather than get undercut by abrupt jokes", and he called it the studio's best film.

Julia Polster of The Daily Pennsylvanian wrote that the film showcases "complex emotions and history in ways even children can appreciate" and positively compared its handling of the portrayal of Jews under oppression to Steven Spielberg's film Schindler's List (1993) and the stage musicals Fiddler on the Roof and Parade. She went on to explain how the film continues to remain relevant and essential in modern times, in part due to an increase of antisemitism and Holocaust denial in the United States during the early months of 2020, saying that "this lack of security is why films like The Prince of Egypt and its more adult counterparts must exist: to teach in an accessible way" and that The Prince of Egypt and other films carry on the history and legacy of Judaism.

For The Film Magazine, Katie Doyle in her 2015 retrospective called the film's portrayal of Moses's encounter with God's voice coming through the burning bush as "a masterpiece of animation" and one of the best depictions of God shown in the film, and she wrote that, for younger viewers, it is "a shining example of a children's movie that delivers mature content to children in a manner that is not too frightening but still gets the deep message across".

It has appeared on many lists as among the best animated films of all time. Jackson Lockhart of Comic Book Resources ranked it first place on his list of the top 10 non-Disney animated musical films, writing that the "songs and visuals are transcendent and packed with symbolism, such as God collapsing a statue of Amun-Ra, the Egyptian God of the sun, before inflicting his plague of darkness". Hannah Shortt of MovieWeb ranked it at number 8 on her list of the "Best Animated Movies From the 1990s", commenting that placing Moses and Rameses's relationship as brothers at the forefront of the film's focus helped make the story feel new and fresh for a modern audience. Jacob Oller of Paste named it the third-best DreamWorks Animation film of all time, calling it "dark, beautiful, and filled with songs as epic as its visuals". It was also voted number 40 on the "Top 100 Animated Features of All Time" list by the Online Film Critics Society, published in March 2003.

In a 2016 interview, the film's executive producer Jeffrey Katzenberg stated that when he watched the film for its 10th anniversary, he reacted by saying "'What were we thinking?'" He elaborated by saying that it is a "dark movie, so dramatic!" with "barely even a little humor", while also noting that he thinks the film is "beautiful and ambitious."

=== Cultural impact ===
The Prince of Egypt saw a resurgence in visibility during the COVID-19 pandemic in 2020, most notably when Cynthia Erivo and Shoshana Bean, with piano accompaniment by Stephen Schwartz, performed a rendition of "When You Believe" during the virtual Saturday Night Seder that April, in response to the shutdown of Broadway and the film's stage musical adaptation suspending performances in the West End. The performance was well-received and their rendition was released as a single on June 30, 2020, to benefit the Jews for Racial and Economic Justice organization. Erivo would go on to perform the song with her Wicked co-star Ariana Grande at the 2024 Met Gala and by herself at the 35th National Memorial Day Concert, both in May 2024. In November 2021, the "River Lullaby" leitmotif became the subject of a TikTok mash-up between that and Hans Zimmer's "Gom Jabbar" score cue from the film adaptation of Dune, created by Nashville singer JADA. The video went viral on the platform within its first 24 hours, garnering 2.3 million views and over 500,000 likes.

In July 2023, to celebrate the film's 25-year anniversary, many crew members who worked on the film, including directors Brenda Chapman, Steve Hickner and Simon Wells, songwriter Stephen Schwartz, and cast members Amick Byram and Eden Riegel, reunited by participating in a 3-hour livestream on YouTube on The Tammy Tuckey Show. The event had been organized ahead of time.

=== Censorship ===
The Prince of Egypt was banned in the Maldives, Malaysia and Egypt, and all state Islam countries, on the grounds that Islamic prophets are not to be visually depicted. The film was also banned in Indonesia but was later released in video CD format.

The Supreme Council of Islamic Affairs in the Maldives stated that "all prophets and messengers of God are revered in Islam, and therefore cannot be portrayed". Following this ruling, the censor board banned the film in January 1999. In the same month, the Film Censorship Board of Malaysia banned the film "so as not to offend the country's majority Muslim population". The board's secretary said that the censor body ruled the film was "insensitive for religious and moral reasons".

=== Accolades ===
List of awards and nominations
Award	Category	Nominee(s)	Result	Ref.
Academy Awards	Best Original Musical or Comedy Score	Music and Lyrics by Stephen Schwartz; Orchestral Score by Hans Zimmer	Nominated	
Academy Awards	Best Original Song	"When You Believe"; Music and Lyrics by Stephen Schwartz	Won	
Annie Awards	Best Animated Feature	Penney Finkelman Cox and Sandra Rabins	Nominated	
Annie Awards	Outstanding Individual Achievement for Directing in an Animated Feature Production	Brenda Chapman, Steve Hickner, and Simon Wells	Nominated	
Annie Awards	Outstanding Individual Achievement for Effects Animation	Jamie Lloyd (Burning Bush/Angel of Death)	Nominated	
Annie Awards	Outstanding Individual Achievement for Storyboarding in an Animated Feature; Production	Lorna Cook	Nominated	
Annie Awards	Outstanding Individual Achievement for Voice Acting in an Animated Feature; Production	Ralph Fiennes	Nominated	
Critics' Choice Movie Awards	Best Animated Feature	Brenda Chapman, Steve Hickner, and Simon Wells	Won (Note: Tied with A Bug's Life.)	
Critics' Choice Movie Awards	Best Song	"When You Believe"; Music and Lyrics by Stephen Schwartz	Won	
Dallas–Fort Worth Film Critics Association Awards	Best Animated Film		Won	
Florida Film Critics Circle Awards	Special Notice to 1998 animation features		Won (Note: Tied with Antz, A Bug's Life and Mulan.)	
Golden Globe Awards	Best Original Score	Stephen Schwartz and Hans Zimmer	Nominated	
Golden Globe Awards	Best Original Song	"When You Believe"; Music and Lyrics by Stephen Schwartz	Nominated	
Golden Reel Awards	Best Sound Editing – Animated Feature		Nominated	
Golden Reel Awards	Best Sound Editing – Music – Animated Feature	Adam Milo Smalley and Brian Richards	Nominated	
Grammy Awards	Best Soundtrack Album	The Prince of Egypt: Music from the Motion Picture; Various Artists and Hans Zimmer	Nominated	
Grammy Awards	Best Song Written for a Motion Picture, Television or Other Visual Media	"When You Believe"; Kenneth "Babyface" Edmonds and Stephen Schwartz	Nominated	
International Film Music Critics Association Awards	Best Original Score for an Adventure Film	Hans Zimmer	Nominated	
Movieguide Awards	Best Movie for Families		Won	
Movieguide Awards	Most Inspiring Movie		Won	
Online Film & Television Association Awards	Best Family Picture	Penney Finkelman Cox and Sandra Rabins	Won	
Online Film & Television Association Awards	Best Family Actor	Ralph Fiennes	Nominated	
Online Film & Television Association Awards	Best Voice-Over Performance	Ralph Fiennes	Nominated	
Online Film & Television Association Awards	Best Family Score	Hans Zimmer and Stephen Schwartz	Won	
Online Film & Television Association Awards	Best Original Song	"Deliver Us"; Music and Lyrics by Stephen Schwartz	Nominated	
Online Film & Television Association Awards	Best Original Song	"When You Believe"; Music and Lyrics by Stephen Schwartz	Nominated	
Online Film & Television Association Awards	Best Cinematic Moment	"The Parting of the Red Sea"	Nominated	
Online Film & Television Association Awards	Best Family Ensemble		Nominated	
Online Film Critics Society Awards	Best Original Score	Hans Zimmer	Nominated	
Satellite Awards	Best Animated or Mixed Media Feature		Nominated	
Satellite Awards	Best Original Song	"When You Believe"; Music and Lyrics by Stephen Schwartz	Nominated	
Saturn Awards	Best Action/Adventure/Thriller Film		Nominated	
Saturn Awards	Best Music	Hans Zimmer	Nominated	
Young Artist Awards	Best Family Feature Film – Animated		Won	
Young Artist Awards	Best Performance in a Voice-Over in a Feature or TV – Best Young Actress	Aria Curzon	Won	

=== American Film Institute recognition ===
The film is recognized by American Film Institute in these lists:

- 2004: AFI's 100 Years...100 Songs:
  - "When You Believe" – Nominated

== Expanded franchise ==
=== Prequel ===
In November 2000, DreamWorks Animation released Joseph: King of Dreams, a direct-to-video spin-off prequel based on the story of Joseph from the Book of Genesis. The project began during production of The Prince of Egypt, employing some of the same animation crew and featuring director Steve Hickner as an executive producer.

=== Stage musical ===
A stage musical adaptation debuted at TheatreWorks in Mountain View, California, on October 14, 2017. The show had an international premiere on April 6, 2018, in Denmark at the Fredericia Teater. It made its West End debut at the Dominion Theatre on February 5, 2020, with an official opening on February 25 and was to spend a 39-week engagement through October 31. Performances were then halted on March 17, due to the COVID-19 pandemic. The show reopened on July 1, 2021, and ran through January 8, 2022. The production was filmed by Universal Pictures Content Group and STEAM Motion + Sound for a future broadcast, and was released in theaters on October 19, 2023. The recorded performance was released on BroadwayHD on November 15 and was followed by a digital release on December 5.

== See also ==
- List of films featuring slavery
- Krishna Aur Kans – a Hindi animated film with similar themes based on the text Bhagavata Purana.

== Notes ==
1. During the production of The Prince of Egypt, DreamWorks had hoped that the film would be a box office success, so they had been pressuring employees to work on the film; however, if they were unable to do so, they were instead forced to work on Shrek, which was expected to flop. Despite this, Shrek was highly successful at the box office, whereas The Prince of Egypt was only a moderate success.
