= Shark Tale =

2004 animated film

- Theatrical release poster
- Directed by: Vicky Jenson; Bibo Bergeron; Rob Letterman
- Screenplay by: Michael J. Wilson; Rob Letterman
- Produced by: Bill Damaschke; Janet Healy; Allison Lyon Segan
- Starring: Will Smith; Robert De Niro; Renée Zellweger; Angelina Jolie; Jack Black; Martin Scorsese
- Edited by: John Venzon
- Music by: Hans Zimmer
- Production company: DreamWorks Animation
- Distributed by: DreamWorks Pictures (Note: In July 2014, the film's distribution rights were purchased by DreamWorks Animation from Paramount Pictures (owners of the pre-2005 DreamWorks Pictures catalog) and transferred to 20th Century Fox before reverting to Universal Pictures in 2018 following NBCUniversal's acquisition of DreamWorks Animation in 2016.)
- Release dates: September 10, 2004 (Venice Film Festival); October 1, 2004 (United States)
- Running time: 90 minutes
- Country: United States
- Language: English
- Budget: $75 million
- Box office: $375 million

Shark Tale is a 2004 American animated film directed by Vicky Jenson, Bibo Bergeron and Rob Letterman, and written by Michael J. Wilson and Letterman. Produced by DreamWorks Animation, the film features the voices of Will Smith, Robert De Niro, Renée Zellweger, Angelina Jolie, Jack Black, and Martin Scorsese. The plot follows an underachieving anthropomorphic fish named Oscar (Smith) who falsely claims to have killed the son of shark mob boss Don Lino (De Niro) in an attempt to advance his community standing. Oscar teams up with the mobster's younger son Lenny (Black) to keep up the facade.

Shark Tale premiered at the Venice Film Festival on September 10, 2004, and was theatrically released in the United States by DreamWorks Pictures on October 1. It was a box-office success, grossing $375 million worldwide against a $75 million budget, becoming the ninth-highest-grossing film of 2004, and received mixed reviews from critics; advocacy groups criticized the film for its use of Italian-American stereotypes. It was nominated for Best Animated Feature at the 77th Academy Awards.

== Plot ==
In the Southside Reef, Oscar is a lonely bluestreak cleaner wrasse who, in his childhood, dreamed of being a tongue-scrubber at the local Whale Wash like his father until he was cruelly mocked for it. Since working at the wash, Oscar now wishes to be the rich and famous fish, but owes money to his boss and the Whale Wash's owner, a pufferfish known as Mr. Sykes. His best friend, an angelfish named Angie who has a secret crush on him, offers him a pearl that was a gift from her grandmother to pawn and pay his debt. One day, Oscar brings the money from the pearl to a seahorse race to meet Sykes, but hears that the race is rigged and bets it all on a seahorse named "Lucky Day", catching the attention of a feisty redhead gold digger lionfish named Lola, who seduces Oscar.

Sykes is annoyed that Oscar bet the money, but he hopes that Oscar might win. Lucky Day eventually takes the lead, only to trip and lose short of the finish line, revealing that the race was rigged against him. Sykes loses his temper and orders his two Jamaican jellyfish henchmen, Ernie and Bernie, to punish Oscar for his actions by banishing him from the reef. Meanwhile, Don Lino, the boss of a mob gang of sharks, orcas, sailfish and octopuses, which Sykes works for, dislikes that his younger son, Lenny, is a vegetarian, and orders his older son, Frankie, to mentor Lenny. While Ernie and Bernie repeatedly sting Oscar, Frankie notices the scene and urges Lenny to eat Oscar. Lenny instead frees Oscar and tells him to escape. Frankie is enraged and charges at Oscar, only to be killed when an anchor from above the surface falls on his neck. Blaming himself for his brother's demise, a devastated Lenny leaves.

Returning to the reef, Oscar takes credit for killing Frankie and rises in fame as the "Sharkslayer". He moves to a luxury apartment at the "top of the reef", while Sykes becomes his manager and forgives his debt. Meanwhile, Don Lino has everyone search for Lenny and the Sharkslayer. Oscar encounters Lenny who, aware of Oscar's lie, begs Oscar to let him hide at his place to avoid returning to his father. Angie soon finds out about Oscar's lie and threatens to tell everyone, but he and Lenny convince her to keep it a secret. Oscar and Lenny stage a fight involving Oscar "fighting" off Lenny, thus cementing Oscar's notoriety and tricking the sharks into thinking that Lenny has been killed too, infuriating Don Lino. Lola kisses Oscar on camera, making Angie jealous. That night, as Lenny disguises himself as a dolphin, Oscar and Angie get into a heated argument, where she admits that she had romantic feelings for Oscar even before he became the Sharkslayer. A remorseful Oscar sadly reflects on his selfishness and dumps Lola, who reacts violently.

Oscar visits the Whale Wash with gifts for Angie, only to discover that Don Lino has kidnapped her with Lola's help as revenge for being dumped. Don Lino threatens to eat Angie if Oscar does not give up his act and surrender, but Lenny "eats" Angie to save her. He soon regurgitates her, inadvertently exposing his true shark self to Don Lino. Believing that he turned his son against him, an enraged Don Lino chases Oscar through the reef. Oscar flees to the Whale Wash, accidentally trapping Lenny in the machinery before also trapping Don Lino. Everyone cheers for Oscar, but he finally confesses the truth behind Frankie's death while urging Don Lino to respect Lenny's lifestyle and not commit the same mistakes he made. A regretful Don Lino reconciles with Lenny and accepts him for who he is. Oscar forsakes all the wealth he has acquired; becomes co-owner of the Whale Wash, now frequented by the gang members; and reconciles with Angie, beginning a romantic relationship with her and living happily in the reef.

Meanwhile Lola arrives at the penthouse to apologize to Oscar for her antagonism, only to encounter his deranged hermit crab friend Crazy Joe instead.

== Voice cast ==
- Will Smith as Oscar, an insecure-yet-streetwise, smooth-talking and comical bluestreak cleaner wrasse who works for the Whale Wash of Southside Reef and often concocts schemes to become rich, famous and respected.
- Robert De Niro as Don Lino, a great white shark who leads a mafia consisting of sharks and other ocean carnivores, uses the Whale Wash as a legitimate business front, and wants his sons Lenny and Frankie to eventually succeed him and run his mafia together.
- Renée Zellweger as Angie, an angelfish and Oscar's best friend and co-worker at the Whale Wash, who harbors a secret crush on him.
- Jack Black as Leonard "Lenny" Lino, Don Lino's second son, a vegetarian, and Frankie's younger brother, who becomes good friends with Oscar and Angie.
- Angelina Jolie as Lola, a gold digging lion fish.
- Martin Scorsese as Mr. Sykes, a loan shark pufferfish and Oscar's boss at the Whale Wash.
- Ziggy Marley and Doug E. Doug as Ernie and Bernie, two Jamaican jellyfish and Sykes' enforcers, who torture anyone who crosses their boss with their stingers.
- Michael Imperioli as Franklin "Frankie" Lino, Lenny's older brother and Don Lino's first son, who is embarrassed by his brother's vegetarian views.
- Vincent Pastore as Luca, a teal octopus and Don Lino's "left-hand, right-hand man", with a tendency to state the obvious. Originally, Luca was going to be played by Kevin Pollak as shown in an early promotional card for the film. Pastore was also going to play an orca character named Willie, who does not appear in the film.
- Peter Falk as Don Feinberg, an elderly leopard shark who leads another shark crime family inspired by the Jewish mafia.
- Katie Couric as Katie Current, a female sea bass who is the local reporter of the Southside Reef in the U.S. release. As her name suggests, she is based on and modeled after Couric. At the time, Katie Couric co-hosted Today in America. In the Australian release, then-local Today co-host Tracy Grimshaw dubbed her lines, while Fiona Phillips of the UK's GMTV provided the voice for the British release of the film and Cristina Parodi of Italy's Verissimo provided the Italian version of the character.
- Lenny Venito as Giuseppe, a hammerhead shark and one of Don Lino's messengers.
- David P. Smith as Crazy Joe, a deranged hermit crab who becomes Oscar's "financial advisor".
- Bobb'e J. Thompson, Kamali Minter and Emily Lyon Segan as the Shorties, three delinquent young fish and friends of Oscar who love to spray graffiti. Two of them are cowfishes, and one is a Pennant coralfish.
- Shelley Morrison as Mrs. Sanchez, an elderly, grumpy weeverfish.
- Sean Bishop as an unnamed green sperm whale who attends the Whale Wash.
- Christina Aguilera and Missy Elliott portray fish and jellyfish versions of themselves at the end of the film, singing "Car Wash".

Additionally, animator David Soren makes cameos as Horace, a shrimp and former enemy of Don Lino's, who escapes being eaten at a shark family meal courtesy of Lenny; a worm on a fishing hook whom Lenny also helps escape; and a starfish.

== Production ==
The film was officially announced and began production in 2002, under the title of Sharkslayer, with Vicky Jenson and Bibo Bergeron directing from a screenplay by Michael J. Wilson, as well as Mark Swift and Damian Shannon, who conceived the film's story. By September 2003, the film had been retitled Shark Tale, to make it sound less violent and more family-friendly. Bill Damaschke, the producer of the film, explained the title change: "In the beginning, we set out to make a movie a little more noir, perhaps a little darker than where we've landed." Shark Tale is the first all computer-animated film produced at DreamWorks Animation's Glendale facility, which previously animated the studio's hand-drawn animated movies, as well as their first computer-animated film to not be produced by Pacific Data Images.

James Gandolfini was initially set to voice the kingpin shark Don Lino. When he later dropped out, Robert De Niro took over the role.

The film was produced concurrently with Finding Nemo, another animated film set underwater, which was released a year and a half earlier. DreamWorks Animation's CEO, Jeffrey Katzenberg, defended the film, saying that "any similarities are mere coincidence. We've been open with the Pixar people, so we don't step on each other's toes."

== Release ==
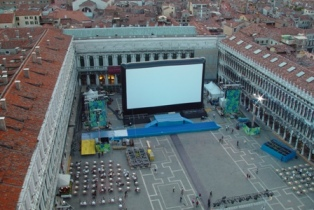
The Piazza San Marco in Venice a day before the film's world premiere, where it was projected on the world's largest inflatable movie screen.

Shark Tale was initially scheduled for release on November 5, 2004, but was later moved up to October 1. This shift was reportedly made to avoid competition with Pixar's The Incredibles, which was released on the same weekend. The film had its worldwide premiere on September 10, 2004, in Piazza San Marco in Venice, Italy. Screening as part of the Venice Film Festival, it marked the first time that Piazza San Marco was closed for a premiere of a major feature film. The film was projected on the largest inflatable screen in the world, measuring more than six stories tall and over 3,900 square feet (360 m^{2}). It required 20,000 cubic feet (570 m^{3}) of air to inflate and more than 50 tons of water for stabilization. The premiere was attended by 6,000 visitors, including Will Smith, Angelina Jolie, Robert De Niro and Michael Imperioli. Jeffrey Katzenberg, the executive producer of the film, explained that they "wanted to find a unique way to introduce this movie to the world. We needed a big idea. ... More than anything, we are in showbusiness. This is the show part."

=== Marketing ===
Burger King featured ten different Shark Tale action figures within its kids meals. Over 100 million The Coca-Cola Company products displayed Shark Tale on their packaging. Specially marked pouches of Minute Maid and Hi-C offered consumers a free movie voucher with three proofs of purchase, or directed them to free limited-time Shark Tale downloads at howdoyouhangout.com. Shark Tale was featured on over 40 million packages of General Mills products, while specially marked cereal packages came with one of five Shark Tale mini video games inside. Great Clips sponsored a national sweepstakes awarding a trip to Shark Tale's world premiere and other prizes, and promoted Shark Tale on Kasey Kahne's NASCAR race car. Hewlett-Packard, whose computers were used to create the film, sponsored online Shark Tale games and activities. Krispy Kreme carried Shark Tale-themed doughnuts.

=== Home media ===
Shark Tale was released on VHS and DVD on February 8, 2005. The DVD contained behind-the-scenes featurettes, games and activities, blooper reels, an audition for the whale Gigi, the Car Wash music video featuring Aguilera and Elliott, and a short film Club Oscar. The film was released on Game Boy Advance Video on November 17, and on Blu-ray on February 5, 2019 by Universal Pictures Home Entertainment.

=== Streaming re-release ===
In April 2023, Shark Tale debuted on streaming platform Netflix. In 2025, the film was listed on Disney+, and Hulu in the United States.

== Reception ==
=== Box office ===
Shark Tale grossed $161 million in the United States and Canada and $214 million in other territories, for a worldwide total of $375 million. It was the ninth-highest-grossing film of 2004.

Shark Tale opened at #1 with $47.6 million, which was, at the time, the second-highest opening for a DreamWorks Animation film behind Shrek 2 ($108 million). It remained the #1 film in the U.S. and Canada for its second and third weekends.

=== Critical response ===
On review aggregation website Rotten Tomatoes, 35% of 181 critics' reviews were positive, with an average rating of 5.3/10. The website's consensus reads, "Derivative and full of pop culture in-jokes." Metacritic, which uses a weighted average, assigned the film a score of 48 out of 100, based on 36 critics, indicating "mixed or average" reviews. Audiences polled by CinemaScore gave the film an average grade of "A−" on an A+ to F scale.

Roger Ebert gave the film two out of four stars, observing, "Since the target audience for Shark Tale is presumably kids and younger teenagers, how many of them have seen the R-rated Godfather and will get all the inside jokes? Not a few, I suppose, and some of its characters and dialogue have passed into common knowledge. But it's strange that a kid-oriented film would be based on parody of a 1972 gangster movie for adults." He also opined that younger viewers would have trouble enjoying a film about adult characters with adult problems, such as an elaborate love triangle and a main character wanting to clear his debt with loan sharks, and compared it to more successful fish-focused animated features like Pixar Animation Studios' Finding Nemo, which Ebert felt featured a simpler plot that audiences could more easily identify with. Richard Roeper commented that although the film was not on the same level as Finding Nemo, it was a film worth seeing.

Todd McCarthy of Variety was critical of the film's lack of originality: "Overfamiliarity extends to the story, jokes and music, most of which reference popular entertainment of about 30 years ago" noting that the script combines The Godfather and Jaws, with a dash of Car Wash. McCarthy calls Smith's character "tiresomely familiar", and Zellweger's "entirely uninteresting", but praises the vocal performance of Martin Scorsese. Kirk Honeycutt of The Hollywood Reporter said the film was not as good as Shrek, but called it "an overly jokey but often quite entertaining spoof that should please families everywhere."

=== Social commentary ===
Shark Tale was criticized for perpetuating negative stereotypes of Italian-Americans in its antagonists. Politician Bill Pascrell said: "The prevailing message is negative and they have to be held out to dry for it. I'm a very proud Italian-American. When you stereotype me, it's like making fun of my grandparents". Columbus Citizens Foundation issued a statement condemning the stereotyping of people with Italian names as gangsters. Dona De Sanctis, deputy executive director of the Order Sons of Italy in America, said: "We were very concerned about this type of stereotyping being passed on to another generation of children." John Mancini, the founder of the Italic Institute of America, protested the movie, stating: "We're concerned about what preteens are learning from the outside world. They don't associate other groups as criminals, they only know Italians as gangsters. Our goal here is to de-Italianize it." The protest was coordinated by the Italian American One Voice Coalition of New Jersey. DreamWorks reacted by changing the name of Peter Falk's character from Don Brizzi to Don Feinberg. However, Mancini demanded that everything Italian—character names, the mannerisms, the forms of speech—be dropped.

Lenny, a shark voiced by Jack Black, spends the film coming to terms with his vegetarianism, a trait deeply ostracised by his carnivorous family. Since the film's release, many have taken this as an allegory for homophobia and self-acceptance—particularly in the context of Lenny's family environment, rife with "alpha male" types who mock his refusal to eat seafood. The American Family Association, a Christian conservative organization, found fault with this aspect, suggesting that it was designed to "brainwash" children into supporting gay rights.

=== Accolades ===
Shark Tale was nominated for Best Animated Feature at the 77th Academy Awards, but lost to Pixar's The Incredibles.

Award	Category	Name	Result
Academy Awards	Best Animated Feature	Bill Damaschke	Nominated
Annie Awards	Outstanding Achievement for Animated Effects	Scott Cegielski	Nominated
Annie Awards	Outstanding Achievement for Character Animation	Ken Duncan	Nominated
Annie Awards	Outstanding Achievement for Character Design in a Feature Production	Carlos Grangel	Nominated
Annie Awards	Outstanding Achievement for Production Design in an Animated Feature Production	Armand Baltazar	Nominated
Annie Awards	Outstanding Achievement for Production Design in an Animated Feature Production	Samuel Michlap	Nominated
Annie Awards	Outstanding Achievement for Production Design in an Animated Feature Production	Pierre-Olivier Vincent	Nominated
Annie Awards	Outstanding Achievement for Writing in a Feature Production	Michael J. Wilson and Rob Letterman	Nominated
Artios Awards	Outstanding Achievement in Animated Voice-Over Feature Casting	Leslee Feldman	Won
ASCAP Film and Television Music Awards	Top Box Office Films	Hans Zimmer	Won
BET Comedy Awards	Best Actor	Will Smith	Nominated
BET Comedy Awards	Best Performance in an Animated Theatrical Film	Will Smith	Nominated
British Academy Children's Awards	Best Feature Film		Nominated
Golden Reel Awards	Best Sound Editing in Feature Film – Animated	Richard L. Anderson, Thomas Jones, Wade Wilson, Mark Binder, Mike Chock, Ralph Osborn, David Williams, Mark A. Mangini and Slamm Andrews	Nominated
Golden Schmoes Awards	Best Animated Movie of the Year		Nominated
Nickelodeon Kids' Choice Awards	Favorite Voice from an Animated Movie	Will Smith	Won
Saturn Awards	Best Animated Film		Nominated
Teen Choice Awards	Choice Movie: Animated/Computer Generated		Nominated
Visual Effects Society Awards	Outstanding Performance by an Animated Character in an Animated Motion Picture	Renée Zellweger and Ken Duncan	Nominated

=== Streaming reception ===
In 2024, Shark Tale reached number 10 on Netflix's top 10 movies list, 20 years after its theatrical release. In 2025, the film reached number 5 on the Disney+ top 10 and featured on the Hulu top 10. The success led to attention from media outlets due to its relative obscurity and age, with Hannah Gearan of Screen Rant calling the film "Will Smith's Forgotten $374M Animated Movie".

== Soundtrack ==
Shark Tale: Motion Picture Soundtrack was released on September 21, 2004. The soundtrack features newly recorded music by various artists, including Christina Aguilera, Mary J. Blige, India.Arie, Bobby Valentino, Sean Paul, Timbaland, D12, JoJo, The Pussycat Dolls, Ludacris, Missy Elliott, Avant and Justin Timberlake, as well as "Some of My Best Friends Are Sharks", the film's closing theme composed by Hans Zimmer.

== Video game ==
A video game based on the film was released on September 29, 2004, for Microsoft Windows, Xbox, GameCube, PlayStation 2 and Game Boy Advance. Published by Activision, Edge of Reality developed the console versions of the game, while Vicarious Visions developed the Game Boy Advance version, and Amaze Entertainment developed the Microsoft Windows version. The cast from the film did not reprise their roles in the game, except David P. Smith reprising his role as Crazy Joe.

== Legacy ==
On April 26, 2011, Jeffrey Katzenberg commented about the possibility of a sequel to Shark Tale as well as Monsters vs. Aliens and Megamind, saying: "All shared an approach and tone and idea of parody, and did not travel well internationally. We don't have anything like that coming on our schedule now."
