= Dean Kelly (artist) =

Irish painter and photographer (born 1977)

- Born: 1977 (age 48–49); Galway, Connacht, Ireland
- Occupations: Painter; photographer
- Website: deankelly.ie

Dean Kelly (born 1977, Galway) is an Irish painter and photographer. His works 'chronicle changes in Irish society through recent years'.

Between 1995 and 2001 Kelly was a member of Macnas Theatre & Spectacle, Galway. (He was prop and theatre designer, and sculptor of a number of 'cabezudos' style caricature heads. These 'massive heads' were later used on Chris Evans' Channel 4 (UK) 'TFI Friday' show in the late 1990s).

In 2015 the artist was included in the National Irish Visual Arts Library (NIVAL) database of Irish artists.

== Selected exhibitions ==
- 2019 National Heritage Week, Dean Kelly, 'City Studies', from August 17th, new paintings and photographs at The Kenny Gallery, Galway
- 2015 April Cúírt International Literature Festival, Latin Quarter Art Trail. Curated by Margaret Nolan.
- 2012 Dean Kelly & Shane Crotty 'Pretty Pictures' – Two man show, Kenny Gallery, Galway. Official opening by Páraic Breathnach.
- 2008 'Modus Operandi?' - Solo exhibition, Kenny Gallery, Galway. Official opening by Tom Kenny.
- 2005 'Listening Eyes' – Invited Group, Music for Galway anniversary exhibition – Norman Villa Gallery, with John Behan RHA. Official opening by Enrique Juncosa, Director IMMA.
- 2004 'Core' collective - Group exhibition, NUI, Galway Gallery. Official opening by Michael D.Higgins (then TD, later President of Ireland).
- 2001–present Collection, The Kenny Gallery, Galway.
