= The Bad Guys (franchise) =

Media franchise by DreamWorks Animation

- Created by: Etan Cohen
- Original work: The Bad Guys
- Owners: DreamWorks Animation (Universal Pictures)
- Years: 2022–present
- Based on: The Bad Guys by Aaron Blabey

Films and television
- Films: The Bad Guys (2022); The Bad Guys 2 (2025); Untitled third film (TBA)
- Animated series: The Bad Guys: The Series (2025–2026)
- Television specials: The Bad Guys: A Very Bad Holiday (2023); The Bad Guys: Haunted Heist (2024)

Games
- Video game: DreamWorks All-Star Kart Racing (2023)

The Bad Guys is a media franchise of crime comedy films made by DreamWorks Animation, loosely based on the children's book series of the same name by Aaron Blabey. The franchise began with the 2022 film of the same name, and has since grown to include two prequel holiday specials, The Bad Guys: A Very Bad Holiday and The Bad Guys: Haunted Heist, which were released on Netflix in 2023 and 2024 respectively. A sequel, The Bad Guys 2, and a prequel streaming series, The Bad Guys: The Series, were released in 2025.

The franchise features the adventures of a gang of humanoid animals who operate as professional criminals in the face of extreme social prejudice against their species. Eventually, they are inspired to strive to change their ways and try to lead normal lives with the secret help of Diane Foxington, a retired criminal formerly "The Crimson Paw" turned State Governor. However, circumstances force them back to using their criminal skills, albeit in the spirit of more constructive goals.

== Films ==
Film	Release date	Director	Screenwriter(s)	Story	Producer(s)
The Bad Guys	April 22, 2022 (US)	Pierre Perifel	Etan Cohen	Based on the books by Aaron Blabey	Damon Ross and Rebecca Huntley
The Bad Guys 2	August 1, 2025 (US)	Pierre Perifel	Yoni Brenner and Etan Cohen	Based on the books by Aaron Blabey	Damon Ross

=== The Bad Guys (2022) ===
On July 22, 2017, Australia's The Daily Telegraph reported that several studios had expressed interest in adapting the series into a film. In March 2018, Variety reported that DreamWorks Animation would develop a film based on the book series, with Etan Cohen writing the screenplay. The following year, in October, it was reported that the film would be directed by Pierre Perifel in his feature directorial debut. The film was described as having "a similar twist on the heist genre that Shrek did on fairy tales, Kung Fu Panda did for the kung fu genre, and what Trolls did for the musical numbers of the franchise." The crew worked remotely during the COVID-19 pandemic.

On July 28, 2021, the cast was announced with Etan Cohen, Patrick Hughes, and author Aaron Blabey set to serve as executive producers for the film.

On October 7, 2019, it was reported that the film would be theatrically released in the United States on September 17, 2021, taking over the release date of Spooky Jack. In December 2020, the film was delayed with The Boss Baby: Family Business taking its original slot, though it was confirmed that it would get a new date "within the coming weeks" due to the COVID-19 pandemic. In March 2021, the release date was scheduled to April 15, 2022. In October 2021, it was pushed back again by one week to April 22. The film was slated to stream in the United States on the Peacock streaming service 45 days after its theatrical release, followed by its Netflix debut after Peacock's 4-month exclusive window. On March 1, 2022, Universal pulled the release in Russia in response to the Russian invasion of Ukraine.

=== The Bad Guys 2 (2025) ===
In March 2022, Perifel said that he would love to do a sequel. Two years later, DreamWorks Animation officially confirmed a sequel with a release date set for August 1, 2025 in the United States. Perifel returned to direct and JP Sans, who served as head of character animation on the previous film, co-directed, with the cast reprising their roles. In addition, the film features new characters played by Natasha Lyonne, Danielle Brooks, and Maria Bakalova.

=== Potential third film ===
In June 2025, two months before the theatrical release of The Bad Guys 2 in the United States, Pierre Perifel and JP Sans revealed in an interview with Collider that they were planning a third film. Sans and Ross, however, have since left DreamWorks Animation for Sony Pictures Animation, leaving the status of the project currently uncertain as of 2026.

== Shorts ==
=== The Bad Guys in Maraschino Ruby (2022) ===
A first short film, The Bad Guys in Maraschino Ruby, was announced in the Blu-ray and Digital release. It was written and directed by head of story Nelson Yokota, and produced by Angie Howard while executive produced by Pierre Perifel, Damon Ross, Rebecca Huntley, and Michael Vollman.

=== The Bad Guys: Little Lies and Alibis (2025) ===
A second short film titled The Bad Guys: Little Lies and Alibis, premiered before the theatrical showings of Dog Man, and it was released on the digital release of The Bad Guys 2 on August 19, 2025 and on the 4K, Blu-ray, and DVD releases of The Bad Guys 2 on October 7.

== Television series ==
=== The Bad Guys: The Series (2025–2026) ===
On October 8, 2025, a prequel series, titled The Bad Guys: Breaking In was announced. It was inspired by the characters from the film and was produced by DreamWorks Animation Television, which premiered on Netflix on November 6, 2025. On March 4, 2026, it was announced that the second and final season of the series was retitled The Bad Guys: The Series, which premiered on Netflix on April 2, 2026.

== Television specials ==
=== The Bad Guys: A Very Bad Holiday (2023) ===
A prequel holiday special, titled The Bad Guys: A Very Bad Holiday, inspired by the characters from the film was produced by DreamWorks Animation Television and was directed by Bret Haaland from Fast & Furious Spy Racers and executive produced by Haaland and Katherina Nolfi from Abominable and the Invisible City and Spirit Riding Free. The holiday special premiered on November 30, 2023, on Netflix.

=== The Bad Guys: Haunted Heist (2024) ===
On July 10, 2024, it was announced that a new Halloween prequel special, titled The Bad Guys: Haunted Heist, inspired by the characters from the film was being produced by DreamWorks Animation Television, which premiered on Netflix on October 3, 2024.

== In other media ==
Mr. Wolf and Foxington are playable characters in the 2023 crossover kart racing video game DreamWorks All-Star Kart Racing.

== Cast and characters ==
List indicators

This section includes characters who will appear or have appeared in more than two films in the series.

- An empty grey cell indicates the character was not in the film, or that the character's official presence has not yet been confirmed.
- ^{Y} indicates a younger version of the character.

Characters	Feature films		Short films		Video games	Television specials		Television series
Characters	The Bad Guys	The Bad Guys 2	The Bad Guys in Maraschino Ruby	The Bad Guys: Little Lies and Alibis	DreamWorks All-Star Kart Racing	The Bad Guys: A Very Bad Holiday	The Bad Guys: Haunted Heist	The Bad Guys: The Series
Mr. Wolf	Sam Rockwell	Sam Rockwell	Sam Rockwell	Sam Rockwell	Michael Godere	Michael Godere	Michael Godere	Michael Godere
Mr. Snake	Marc Maron	Marc Maron	Marc Maron	Marc Maron		Chris Diamantopoulos	Chris Diamantopoulos	Chris Diamantopoulos
Mr. Shark	Craig Robinson	Craig Robinson	Craig Robinson	Craig Robinson		Ezekiel Ajeigbe	Ezekiel Ajeigbe	Ezekiel Ajeigbe
Mr. Piranha	Anthony Ramos	Anthony Ramos	Anthony Ramos	Anthony Ramos		Raul Ceballos	Raul Ceballos	Raul Ceballos
Ms. Tarantula / "Webs"	Awkwafina	Awkwafina	Awkwafina	Awkwafina		Mallory Low	Mallory Low	Mallory Low
Diane Foxington / The Crimson Paw	Zazie Beetz	Zazie Beetz			Bryce Charles			
Professor Marmalade	Richard Ayoade	Richard Ayoade						
Chief / Commissioner Misty Luggins	Alex Borstein	Alex Borstein	Alex Borstein					
Tiffany Fluffit	Lilly Singh	Lilly Singh				Zehra Fazal		Zehra Fazal
Kitty Kat		Danielle Brooks						
Susan / "Doom"		Natasha Lyonne						
Pigtail Petrova		Maria Bakalova						
Jerimiah Moon		Colin Jost						
Mr. Soliman		Omid Djalili						
Jorge Garcia		Jaime Camil						
Officer Bob			Orlando Duenas					
Phone Operator			Angie Howard					
Gary						Keith Silverstein		Keith Silverstein
DJ Trudy Tude						Kari Wahlgren		
Reginald E. Scary							Chris Diamantopoulos	
Mr. Wigglesworth								Patton Oswalt
Serpentina								Kate Mulgrew
Peppy Sweet Pots								Maria Bamford
Chaz								Keith Silverstein
Kevin								Keith Silverstein
Coffee Vendor								Keith Silverstein
Ash								Kimberly Brooks
Thalia								Kimberly Brooks
Ricki Talon								Lisa Gilroy
Skulli Flame-Boni								Vincent Tong
Baron Von Tuskington								Ian James Corlett
D.B. Cougar								Jason Alexander
Chi-Hoon								Michaela Dietz
Jeff								Tom Taylorson
Beverly								Cheri Oteri
Tanya Ripper								Jess Darrow
Vanna Tee								Ashley Park
Tiffany Fluffit Sr.								Zehra Fazal

== Reception ==
=== Box office performance ===
Film	U.S. release date	Box office gross			All-time ranking		Budget	Ref.
Film	U.S. release date	U.S. and Canada	Other territories	Worldwide	U.S. and Canada	Worldwide	Budget	Ref.
The Bad Guys	April 22, 2022	$97,459,240	$153,373,095	$250,832,335			$69–80 million	
The Bad Guys 2	August 1, 2025	$82,593,605	$157,025,063	$239,618,668			$80 million	
Total		$180,044,850	$310,398,158	$490,451,003			$149–160 million	

=== Critical and public response ===
Film	Critical		Public	
Film	Rotten Tomatoes	Metacritic	CinemaScore	PostTrak
The Bad Guys	87% (174 reviews)	64 (26 reviews)	A	—N/a
The Bad Guys 2	88% (115 reviews)	64 (23 reviews)	A	—N/a
