= The Bad Guys (book series) =

Comic book series

- Author: Aaron Blabey
- Illustrator: Aaron Blabey
- Country: Australia
- Language: English
- Genre: Children's literature; Comedy; Crime fiction
- Publisher: Scholastic
- Published: 1 July 2015 – 1 October 2024 (Australia); 27 December 2016 – 12 November 2024 (USA)
- Media type: Print (hardcover and paperback)
- No. of books: 20

The Bad Guys is an illustrated children's graphic novel series written by Australian author and former actor Aaron Blabey. It revolves around a gang of anthropomorphic animals known as The Bad Guys. The group of animals attempt to perform good deeds to change society's perception of them as criminals.

DreamWorks Animation acquired the rights to the series to make an animated feature film adaptation, which was released in the United States on 22 April 2022. A second film was released in the US on 1 August 2025. It has also spawned a media franchise, including a series of Netflix-exclusive prequels released between the main films.

== Characters ==
=== Primary ===
- Mr. Moe Wolf – A gray wolf and leader of the Good Guys Club (also known as Shadow Squad G), who is tired of being seen as a villain. He recruits his friends to do good deeds and clear their reputations, but despite his good intentions, his enthusiasm often causes their missions to fail.
- Mr. Cedric Snake – An eastern brown snake who works on the team's stealth tactics. He is self-centered, and often diverts from the Good Guys Club's goals. During the book's second arc, he is possessed by an otherworldly entity and becomes the antagonistic force known as the Dark Lord of Serpents.
- Mr. Pepe Piranha – A Bolivian red-bellied piranha serving as the team's muscle. He has a bad temper that contrasts with his small size. His family runs a mafia-like operation with his father as the leader.
- Mr. Lou Shark – A great white shark who fulfills a role of a master-of-disguise. Despite his large size and intimidating appearance, he is usually the most serene of the group. At first, he did not like Mr. Stevie due to his arachnophobia, but came to accept his presence.
- Mr. Stevie Tarantula/Ms. Tarantula – A sharp-tongued redknee tarantula and expert hacker, also known as "Legs". Often speaking in jive, he prefers not to wear clothing, which confuses the rest of the team. In the DreamWorks adaptation, the character is female and nicknamed "Webs".

=== Secondary ===
- Doctor Rupert Marmalade/Professor Rupert Marmalade IV – A guinea pig mad scientist who wants to take over the world and hates being called cute. In the book series, the Bad Guys find him after they rob his chicken farm, and he is later revealed to be an alien. In the DreamWorks adaptation, Marmalade is a renowned genius who supposedly "stops wars, feeds the hungry, and saves countless pandas". As a philanthropist, he is in charge of reforming the Bad Guys, but secretly uses them as a cover-up for his criminal plot: mind-controlling other guinea pigs into stealing back his charity donations.
- Dread Overlord Splaarghön – The primary antagonist of the later books, an evil centipede-like demon who seeks to conquer the multiverse. Splaarghön's primary tactics include granting evil powers to characters to act as his underlords.
- The Underlords – The minions of Dread Overlord Splaarghön who would eventually be purified in "The Serpent and the Beast". Mr. Snake, Mr. Shark, Agent Hogwild, Agent Kitty Kat, and Agent Fox were briefly members of the Underlords.
- Underlord Shaård/Dickie – A chainsaw monster and one of Splaarghön's minions who rules a universe full of sharp blades and broken glass. Later on, he is discovered to be a baby spoon named Dickie who sought help from Splaarghön, thus giving him powers akin to the other Underlords.
- Underlord Onsàáy – A large bee and member of the Underlords. Her full name is Queen Bee Onsàáy, and she rules a universe that resembles a beehive full of giant bees. Onsàáy's true form is a tiny bee.
- Underlord Doctor David Drilllaärgh – A member of the Underlords. He is an unlicensed and unstable jackal dentist who rules a dental-themed universe. It is later shown that his true form is an ordinary jackal.
- Nursie – A large anthropomorphic molar tooth who works as Drilllaärgh's dental assistant.
- Underlord Esmeralda Ghaāstly — A member of the Underlords with a scorpion-shaped head. She rules a universe that looks like a forest. Ghaāstly is also said to bring bad luck, bad weather, bad moods, and bad hair. Her true form is later established to be an anthropomorphic deer.
- Eaar of Splaarghön — A multi-eared, sphere-shaped monster who is presumably the last member of the Underlords and "master of ceremonies". He rules over an arena dimension populated with demonic worm-like creatures. It is later revealed that the Eaar of Splaarghön's true form is a human boy.

=== Other ===
- Agent Ellen Fox/Diane Foxington – A fox who was hunted and hated at a young age due to her species. She is a member of the International League of Heroes and Mr. Wolf's love interest. In books 3-7, she helps the Good Guys Club stop Professor Marmalade from turning every cute animal in the world into zombies. In the DreamWorks adaptation, she is a red fox governor named Diane Foxington, later revealed to be a former thief known as the Crimson Paw.
- Tiffany Fluffit/Delores Gristlewurst — An anchorwoman who makes reports about The Bad Guys' behaviour. While she is a cat in the books, she was rewritten as a human in the media franchise. Later in the books, it was revealed that her real name is Delores Gristlewurst.
- Granny Gumbo — An alligator who helped Mr. Wolf, Mr. Snake, Mr. Tarantula, and Agent Fox in "The Attack Of The Zittens" to turn the Zittens back into normal kittens. In the second arc, she is revealed to be a part of an intergalactic team called The Others.
- Agent Pam Kitty Kat – A black cat, member of the International League of Heroes, and Mr. Shark's love interest. In the DreamWorks adaptation, she is a snow leopard and a criminal.
- Agent Emmylou Hogwild/Pigtail – A pig and member of the International League of Heroes who has a crush on Piranha. In the DreamWorks adaptation, she is a wild boar and a criminal.
- Agent Joy/Susan Doom – A raven, member of the International League of Heroes, and Mr. Snake's love interest. In the DreamWorks adaptation, she is a criminal.
- Agent Rhonda Shortfuse/The One – A small Tasmanian devil, a member of the International League of Heroes, and Mr. Tarantula's love interest. Further on in the series, it is disclosed that she is actually a spirit known as the One, who was created at the beginning of the universe with the intention of fending off Dread Overlord Splaarghön. She is, in fact, a being of light who only assumes the form of a Tasmanian devil.
- The Others – An inter-dimensional team of heroes who are claimed to be fragments of The One.
- Milton – A Velociraptor from the Cretaceous period who is accidentally sent to the present and given high intelligence. In the second arc, he is discovered to be a member of The Others.
- Abe – A bat member of The Others who never lies.
- Zee — A lizard member of The Others.
- Papa Hector Piranha – The father of Mr. Piranha.
- Buck Thunders – A bull who helps the B Team (Agent Doom, Mr. Tarantula, Milton, Papa Piranha, and Nathan) to find The Others. Later, it is shown that Buck Thunders is a spy of Dread Overlord Splaarghön.
- Mr. Vincent (Vinnie) Wolf — Father of Moe Wolf (Mr. Wolf). It was Vincent's mistreatment of him that drove Moe to a life of crime.

== Novels ==
1. The Bad Guys: Episode 1 (2015)
2. The Bad Guys: Episode 2: Mission Unpluckable (2015)
3. The Bad Guys: Episode 3: The Furball Strikes Back (2016)
4. The Bad Guys: Episode 4: Attack of the Zittens (2016)
5. The Bad Guys: Episode 5: Intergalactic Gas (2017)
6. The Bad Guys: Episode 6: Alien vs. Bad Guys (2017)
7. The Bad Guys: Episode 7: Do-You-Think-He-Saurus? (2018)
8. The Bad Guys: Episode 8: Superbad (2018)
9. The Bad Guys: Episode 9: The Big Bad Wolf (2019)
10. The Bad Guys: Episode 10: The Baddest Day Ever (2019)
11. The Bad Guys: Episode 11: Dawn of the Underlord (2020)
12. The Bad Guys: Episode 12: The One?! (2020)
13. The Bad Guys: Episode 13: Cut to the Chase (2021)
14. The Bad Guys: Episode 14: They're Bee-hind You! (2021)
15. The Bad Guys: Episode 15: Open Wide and Say Arrrgh! (2022)
16. The Bad Guys: Episode 16: The Others?! (2022)
17. The Bad Guys: Episode 17: Let the Games Begin! (2023)
18. The Bad Guys: Episode 18: Look Who's Talking! (2023)
19. The Bad Guys: Episode 19: The Serpent and the Beast (2024)
20. The Bad Guys: Episode 20: One Last Thing (2024)

== Other media ==
=== DreamWorks franchise ===
==== Films ====
On 22 July 2017, Australia's The Daily Telegraph reported that several studios had expressed interest in adapting the series into a film. In March 2018, Variety reported that DreamWorks Animation would develop a film based on the book series, with Etan Cohen writing the screenplay. The following year, in October, it was reported that the film would be directed by Pierre Perifel in his feature directorial debut. The film was described as having "a similar twist on the heist genre that Shrek did on fairy tales, and what Kung Fu Panda did for the kung fu genre". The crew worked remotely during the COVID-19 pandemic.

On 28 July 2021, the cast was announced with Etan Cohen, Patrick Hughes, and author Aaron Blabey set to serve as executive producers for the film.

On 7 October 2019, it was reported that the film would be theatrically released on 17 September 2021 in the United States, taking over the release date of Spooky Jack. Due to the COVID-19 pandemic, the film was delayed with The Boss Baby: Family Business taking its original slot in December 2020, though it was confirmed that it would get a new date "within the coming weeks". In March 2021, the release date was scheduled to 15 April 2022. In October 2021, it was pushed back again by one week to 22 April. The film was slated to stream in the United States on the Peacock streaming service 45 days after its theatrical release, followed by its Netflix debut after Peacock's 4-month exclusive window. On 1 March 2022, Universal pulled the release in Russia in response to the Russian invasion of Ukraine.

In March 2022, a month before the film's US release, Perifel said that he would love to do a sequel. Two years later, DreamWorks Animation officially confirmed a sequel and was released on 1 August 2025 in the United States. Perifel returned to direct and JP Sans, who served as head of character animation on the previous film, co-directed, with the cast reprising their roles.

==== Shorts ====
A follow-up short based on the film, The Bad Guys in Maraschino Ruby, was announced in the Blu-ray and Digital release with a story made and directed by head of the story Nelson Yokota, and produced by Angie Howard while executive produced by Pierre Perifel, Damon Ross, Rebecca Huntley, and Michael Vollman.

Another short film, The Bad Guys: Little Lies and Alibis, would be produced by DreamWorks in 2025, ahead of the release of The Bad Guys 2, and would see a release in theaters alongside the DWA film Dog Man upon its release on 31 January of that year.

==== Holiday special ====
A holiday special, titled The Bad Guys: A Very Bad Holiday, inspired by the characters from the film was being produced by DreamWorks Animation Television and was directed by Bret Haaland from Fast & Furious Spy Racers and executive produced by Haaland and Katherina Nolfi from Abominable and the Invisible City and Spirit Riding Free. The holiday special premiered on 30 November 2023, on Netflix, albeit none of the film's principal voice cast would be reprising their respective roles for the special.

==== Halloween special ====
A Halloween special and second prequel, titled The Bad Guys: Haunted Heist, was announced in August 2024, and premiered on Netflix on 3 October 2024, with the main voice cast from A Very Bad Holiday reprising their roles.

==== Television series ====
On 8 October 2025, a prequel series titled The Bad Guys: The Series was announced. Inspired by the characters from the film, the series follows the Bad Guys as they put together their first crime. It was produced by DreamWorks Animation Television, with the main voice cast of the holiday prequels reprising their roles, and premiered on Netflix on 6 November 2025.
