= The Bad Guys: Haunted Heist =

2024 American short film

- Based on: The Bad Guys by Pierre Perifel; The Bad Guys by Aaron Blabey
- Written by: Ben Glass
- Directed by: Kevin Peaty
- Voices of: Michael Godere; Ezekiel Ajeigbe; Raul Ceballos; Chris Diamantopoulos; Mallory Low
- Theme music composer: Brandon Liew
- Composers: Taylor Page; Daniel Futcher
- Country of origin: United States
- Original language: English

Production
- Executive producers: Bret Haaland; Katherine Nolfi
- Editors: Ben Glass; Adam Smith
- Running time: 24 minutes
- Production company: DreamWorks Animation Television

Original release
- Network: Netflix
- Release: October 3, 2024

The Bad Guys: Haunted Heist is a 2024 CG animated Halloween crime comedy short film based on the 2022 film The Bad Guys, which in turn is based on the graphic novel series of the same name. This was the second special based on the film after A Very Bad Holiday and before The Bad Guys 2, with the cast of said special reprising their roles for Haunted Heist, and later again for the prequel series which premiered in November 2025.

The special premiered on Netflix on October 3, 2024.

== Plot ==
Before the events of the first film, Wolf tells the gang about a legendary treasure belonging to a villainous shoebill stork named Reginald E. Scary, saying that anyone who takes it would be haunted for the rest of their lives. They don't believe him, however, as he has been known to prank them on Halloween by scaring them. He promises not to scare them, as they head to Scary's mansion. While there, they are continually scared by automated contraptions Scary left to frighten thieves away. They manage to find the treasure, an amulet, and steal it, but not before Wolf plays one more prank on them.

Back at their hideout, Wolf starts going crazy, hearing music that no one else does, and having a strange dream. Thinking that he has to return the amulet to appease Scary, Wolf rallies the crew to go back to the mansion. They head to the mansion, when the gang is kidnapped, leading to Wolf returning the amulet. It's soon revealed that the others pranked Wolf after he did the same to them. However, when Wolf takes the amulet again, he disintegrates, before revealing that he knew about the prank and manipulated them to use it against them. Furious by how he pranked them twice, the gang lunge at Wolf and attack him.

== Voice cast ==
- Michael Godere as Mr. Wolf
- Ezekiel Ajeigbe as Mr. Shark
- Raul Ceballos as Mr. Piranha
- Chris Diamantopoulos as Mr. Snake and Reginald E. Scary
- Mallory Low as Ms. Tarantula

== Reception ==
Common Sense Media rated the film 4 out of 5 stars. Greg Wheeler of "The Review Geek" said, "If you’re a fan of the Bad Guys though, you should find enough to whet the appetite but beyond a little treat for the kids, there’s not a whole lot to sink your teeth into."

== Other media ==
A novelization of the same name, by Kate Howard, was released by Scholastic on August 6, 2024.
