= The Bad Guys: The Series =

DreamWorks Animation television series

- Season 2 promotional poster
- Also known as: The Bad Guys: Breaking In (season 1)
- Genre: Crime comedy
- Based on: The Bad Guys by Pierre Perifel; The Bad Guys by Aaron Blabey
- Developed by: Ben Glass; Katherine Nolfi
- Creative directors: Jennifer Taylor; Jeff Tucker
- Voices of: Michael Godere; Ezekiel Ajeigbe; Raul Ceballos; Chris Diamantopoulos; Mallory Low
- Composers: Taylor Page; Daniel Futcher
- Country of origin: United States
- Original language: English
- No. of seasons: 2
- No. of episodes: 19

Production
- Executive producers: Bret Haaland; Katherine Nolfi
- Animator: 88 Pictures
- Editor: Ben Glass
- Running time: 24-25 minutes
- Production company: DreamWorks Animation Television

Original release
- Network: Netflix
- Release: November 6, 2025 – April 2, 2026

The Bad Guys: The Series (formerly known as The Bad Guys: Breaking In in its first season), is an American animated crime comedy television series based on the 2022 film The Bad Guys, which in turn is based on the graphic novel series of the same name. Like the two television specials that came before, the series serves as a prequel to the original film. Michael Godere, Ezekiel Ajeigbe, Raul Ceballos, Chris Diamantopoulos, and Mallory Low all reprise their roles from the specials; none of the films' original cast return.

The series was released via Netflix on November 6, 2025. Its second and final season premiered on April 2, 2026.

== Premise ==
Long before their successful criminal careers, the Bad Guys were small-time criminals who wanted to increase their notoriety for by performing large heists so they could gain prominence over other notorious criminal gangs, however their scheming would also be their own undoing.

== Voice cast ==
=== Main ===
- Michael Godere as Mr. Wolf
- Ezekiel Ajeigbe as Mr. Shark
- Raul Ceballos as Mr. Piranha
- Chris Diamantopoulos as Mr. Snake
- Mallory Low as Ms. Tarantula

=== Recurring ===
- Zehra Fazal as Tiffany Fluffit and Tiffany Fluffit Sr.
- Maria Bamford as Peppy Sweet Pots
- Patton Oswalt as Mr. Wigglesworth
- Keith Silverstein as Gary, Chaz, Kevin, and the Coffee Vendor
- Kimberly Brooks as Ash and Thalia
- Lisa Gilroy as Ricki Talon
- Vincent Tong as Skulli Flame-Boni
- Ian James Corlett as Baron Von Tuskington
- Kate Mulgrew as Serpentina
- Jason Alexander as D.B. Cougar
- Michaela Dietz as Chi-Hoon
- Tom Taylorson as Jeff
- Cheri Oteri as Beverly
- Ashley Park as Vanna Tee
- Jessica Darrow as Tanya Ripper

== Episodes ==
=== Series overview ===
Series overview
Season	Episodes	Originally released
1	9	November 6, 2025
2	10	April 2, 2026

=== Season 1: Breaking In (2025) ===
No. overall	No. in season	Title	Directed by	Written by	Original release date
1	1	"Bad Beginnings"	Bret Haaland	Katherine Nolfi	November 6, 2025
Mr. Wolf and his loyal band of thieves set out to make a name for themselves by stealing an iconic painting from the local museum.
2	2	"The Sweet, Sweet Steal"	Kevin Peaty	Kyel White	November 6, 2025
Still itching to be recognized for their crimes, the Bad Guys set out to swipe a top-secret recipe from a suspiciously sweet candy maker.
3	3	"No News Is Bad News"	Emmanuel Deligiannis	Ben Glass	November 6, 2025
Wolf arranges for the team to be interviewed on the news as a way to hype up their heists. But are the Bad Guys really ready for prime time?
4	4	"This Means Chore"	Pete Jacobs	Katherine Nolfi	November 6, 2025
Tired of living in a messy lair, Piranha creates a household chore wheel. (Sorry, Mr. Wolf, but planning the perfect heist will have to wait.)
5	5	"The Webs, the Wigglesworth and the Wardrobe"	Pete Jacobs	Elizabeth Chun	November 6, 2025
After bungling a heist, Webs is worried the team might want to kick her out - so she asks a legendary escape artist to teach them all some new tricks.
6	6	"It's a Hard Heist Life"	Kevin Peaty	Kyel White	November 6, 2025
When an anti-aging cream transforms Snake into an adorable baby, the Bad Guys use his cuteness to try and pull a long con on a childless baron.
7	7	"Heist on the Run"	Emmanuel Deligiannis; TJ Sullivan	Ben Glass	November 6, 2025
The Bad Guys set out to out-heist the infamous Night Owls - but bragging about it online before they've actually succeeded puts them in a tough spot.
8	8	"Home Is Where the Heist Is"	Pete Jacobs	Shane Lynch	November 6, 2025
Suspecting Snake is hiding something, the rest of the Bad Guys tail him to a mysterious mansion and find themselves face-to-face with a legendary thief.
9	9	"Crime After Crime"	Kevin Peaty	Elizabeth Chun	November 6, 2025
The Bad Guys discover Wolf's dearly departed mentor left him an inheritance. But to get it, the gang will have to pull off five heists in just one night.

=== Season 2 (2026) ===
No. overall	No. in season	Title	Directed by	Written by	Original release date
10	1	"The Heist-Over"	Pete Jacobs	Ben Glass	April 2, 2026
Something smells fishy. When the Bad Guys can't find Piranha - and can't remember anything from the night before - they attempt to retrace their steps.
11	2	"The Con Test"	Kevin Peaty	Shane Lynch	April 2, 2026
Can the Bad Guys keep their criminal instincts in check? Webs acts as ref while the rest try to make it to the end of the day without pulling a heist.
12	3	"Natural Heistory"	Emmanuel Deligiannis	Elizabeth Chun	April 2, 2026
The Bad Guys get in touch with their primal side when an extinct wolfanderthal criminal busts out of icy captivity -- and into the present.
13	4	"A Nice Day for a Bad Wedding"	Pete Jacobs	Tom Yang	April 2, 2026
Snake recruits the crew to steal away his mom's happiness after she surprises him with news that she's marrying one of the Bad Guys' biggest enemies.
14	5	"Me Mentor Mori"	Kevin Peaty	Ben Glass	April 2, 2026
On the hook for his own bad deeds, Wolf's legendary mentor mysteriously returns to claim the rest of his loot -- and cast some doubt among the squad.
15	6	"Double Jeopardy"	Emmanuel Deligiannis	Shane Lynch	April 2, 2026
To keep their crime streak on full throttle, the Bad Guys look to join forces with some cosplaying copycats who badly need the crew's crooked advice.
16	7	"I, Webs"	Pete Jacobs	Elizabeth Chun	April 2, 2026
The gang convinces Webs to hack together an AI-powered getaway car. But things take a wrong turn when their advanced auto tech tries to take control.
17	8	"Bad Actors"	Kevin Peaty	Shane Lynch	April 2, 2026
Everyone goes gaga for a superstar's new movie as the Bad Guys head to Hollywood, where Shark's dreams of the spotlight keep their crime streak alive.
18	9	"Fear the Ripper"	Emmanuel Deligiannis	Ben Glass	April 2, 2026
One steal away from becoming legends, the Bad Guys meet their match in a vengeful vigilante with plans to polish off all crime in one fell swoop.
19	10	"Fear the Ripper Pt. 2"	Pete Jacobs	Caitlin Meares	April 2, 2026
Thanks to a crusading crime stopper known as the Ripper, the city is unrecognizable. Can the Bad Guys pull out all their tricks to get their city back?

== Release ==
In October 2025, the series was revealed via a trailer. The first season was released on November 6 on Netflix. In March 2026, the second season and a retitling of the series was announced, which was released on April 2.
