= The Bad Guys: A Very Bad Holiday =

2023 American television special

- Based on: The Bad Guys by Pierre Perifel; The Bad Guys by Aaron Blabey
- Written by: Katherine Nolfi
- Directed by: Bret Haaland
- Voices of: Michael Godere; Ezekiel Ajeigbe; Raul Ceballos; Chris Diamantopoulos; Mallory Low
- Theme music composer: Brandon Liew
- Composers: Daniel Futcher; Taylor Page
- Country of origin: United States
- Original language: English

Production
- Executive producers: Bret Haaland; Katherine Nolfi
- Producers: Aaron Blabey; Patrick Hughes (Note: Both Blabey and Hughes are credited as "Consulting Producers".)
- Editor: Ben Glass
- Running time: 25 minutes
- Production company: DreamWorks Animation Television

Original release
- Network: Netflix
- Release: November 30, 2023

The Bad Guys: A Very Bad Holiday is a 2023 animated Christmas television special based on the 2022 film The Bad Guys, which in turn is based on the graphic novel series of the same name. The special is the first of two holiday specials, followed by 2024's Haunted Heist.

Directed by Bret Haaland, the special premiered on November 30, 2023, on Netflix.

== Plot ==
Set before the events of the movie, the Bad Guys are riding around the city and looking forward to rob a bank on Christmas, taking advantage that everyone will be celebrating in their homes. At a parade, their car gets tied to a beloved Santa Claus balloon which they end up destroying accidentally. As a result, the city's mood falls so low that Christmas is cancelled. Concerned that their heist will not be possible, the Bad Guys set out to cheer up the city. At first, Webs suggests replacing the balloon with a Santa Claus exoskeleton she has built, but the rest of the gang disagree as it looks too intimidating. Instead, Wolf suggests recreating the balloon, but it ends up looking horrible and is discarded as well.

With 12 hours left for Christmas morning, they plan to break into a radio station to broadcast Christmas carols again —having been replaced with heavy metal music since the cancellation— as Wolf and Snake steal presents to deliver them to people's homes. Though the plan is successful, Wolf feels the need for snow to fully rekindle people's spirit. To do that, Webs modifies the shaved ice machine of a street stand, but contrary to her instructions, Wolf increases its power output. Snow begins, but it quickly spirals into an ice storm terrorizing the city. The gang reprimand Wolf's tendency to push things too far, but they forgive him when he admits that he was just trying to give them the best heist ever, instead of showing off. Wolf uses the Santa Claus exoskeleton to deactivate the ice machine. When the storm ends, the exoskeleton becomes the city's new hero and mascot. Through its microphone, Shark tells the citizens to go back to their homes.

The Bad Guys go back to their hideout, but they have now caught a cold and cannot carry out the robbery. To their surprise and dismay, they find presents from Santa Claus for the good deeds they have done. As a result, they begin working on a plan to heist Santa's workshop to prove that they belong on the naughty list.

== Voice cast ==
- Michael Godere as Mr. Wolf
- Ezekiel Ajeigbe as Mr. Shark
- Raul Ceballos as Mr. Piranha
- Chris Diamantopoulos as Mr. Snake
- Mallory Low as Ms. Tarantula
- Zehra Fazal as Tiffany Fluffit
- Keith Silverstein as Gary, the Shaved Ice vendor
- Kari Wahlgren as DJ Trudy Tude

== Production ==
The special was announced in November 2022, with Bret Haaland as director and an executive producer alongside Katherine Nolfi. In October 2023, TVLine revealed that none of the original film cast would be reprising their respective roles and instead star Godere, Ajeigbe, Ceballos, Diamantopoulos and Low, respectively. Godere provided minor miscellaneous voice work in the feature film.

== Other media ==
A novelization of the same name, by Kate Howard, was released by Scholastic on October 3, 2023.
