= Zehra Fazal =

American voice actress

- Occupation: Voice actress
- Years active: 2004–present

Zehra Fazal is an American voice actress, known for voicing Nadia Rizavi in Voltron: Legendary Defender and Halo and Harper Row in Young Justice.

== Career ==
Prior to her voice acting career, Fazal, who is of Pakistani descent, was known for her irreverent comedy often poking fun at Muslim identity. Her one-woman musical comedy show Headscarf and the Angry Bitch, which she described as partly fictional and partly autobiographical, created Muslim parodies of holiday comedy songs - for instance, "The Ramadan Song" instead of "The Chanukah Song" - and discussed living in America with a "hyphenated identity." Fazal, who describes herself as "the Muslim Weird Al", explains that the show explores the fact that "the definition of what it is to be Muslim is expanding and it's okay to be vocal about it." She created the show's character, Zed Headscarf, as "her tougher, bolder, prouder side", partly in response to post-9/11 Islamophobia she encountered. Fazal's performance won the "best solo performance award" at the Capital Fringe Festival in 2009 and was sold out throughout its New York International Fringe Festival run in 2010.

Fazal has also portrayed Adolf Hitler in an adaptation of Yukio Mishima's play, My Friend Hitler. She studied with Japan’s Takarazuka Revue Company as a research intern in 2004. After returning to the United States, Fazal translated and staged Takarazuka Revue's The Rose of Versailles at Wellesley College, where she was a student. Fazal explains "I have a knack for taking something that already exists and making it fit into a new mold." Fazal also portrayed doctor Amanda Jain in the video comedy series F#@K I Love U.

During the development of Young Justice: Outsiders, co-creator Greg Weisman wrote the role for Halo with Fazal in mind; she would also play about a dozen other characters featured on the show.

== Personal life ==
Fazal has a B.A. from Wellesley College. She speaks Japanese, French, and Urdu. Fazal is a passionate supporter of Paani Project, a nonprofit that works with community partners and institutions in the United States and Pakistan to help alleviate clean water inaccessibility, advocate for gender equity, and address a variety of pressing health disparities in rural South Asian communities.

As a child, she was a fan of the Disney animated show Darkwing Duck; she drew on inspiration on the titular character for her performance as General Yunan on Disney's Amphibia.

== Filmography ==
=== Animation ===
List of voice performances in animation
Year	Title	Role	Notes	Source
2018	Voltron: Legendary Defender	Nadia Rizavi, Hunk's Mother	11 episodes	
2018–2023	Craig of the Creek	Faraday, Shannon, Aggie (The Squashinator)	15 episodes	
2019–2022	Young Justice	Halo, Cassandra Savage, Harper Row, Hawkwoman, Lian Harper, Talia al Ghul, Windfall, Trajectory, Antonia Rodriguez, Madia Daou, Evelyn Fox, J'arlia J'axx, S'yraa S'mitt, Martha Kent	34 episodes	
2019	Trolls: The Beat Goes On!	Celine Starburst, Timpani	2 episodes	
2019	Pinky Malinky	Aisha	Episode: "Advanced"	
2019	BoJack Horseman	Demi, Ilana and Ilana	Episode: "Surprise!"	
2019–20	She-Ra and the Princesses of Power	Mara	4 episodes	
2019–21	Big Hero 6: The Series	Basemax, Officer Flynn	13 episodes	
2020	Glitch Techs	Zahra, Sabrina	9 episodes	
2020	Where’s Waldo?	Film Director	Episode: “Mumbai Dance Party”	
2020	Vampirina	Dr. Millweed	Episode: "Weekend with Grandpop/Haunted House Call"	
2020–2022	Amphibia	General Yunan	9 episodes	
2021, 2023	Invincible	Various voices	2 episodes	
2021	Gen:Lock	Minu	Episode: "The First Strike"	
2022	Wolfboy and the Everything Factory	Professor Pigment	Episode: "The Colors Faded"	
2022	Dragon Age: Absolution	Tassia	Main role	
2023–present	My Adventures with Superman	Livewire, additional voices	7 episodes	
2023	Dew Drop Diaries	Tracy Ryan	20 episodes	
2023	The Bad Guys: A Very Bad Holiday	Tiffany Fluffit	Christmas TV special	
2025	Your Friendly Neighborhood Spider-Man	Doctor Carla Connors, Susan O'Hara, Hot Rod	6 episodes	
2025	Super Duper Bunny League	Fantasy Voice, Citizen	Episode: "Ye Olde Sourbreath!"	
2025	The Mighty Nein	Curator Tasha	Episode: "Many Gifts"	
2025–2026	The Bad Guys: The Series	Tiffany Fluffit, Tiffany Fluffit Sr.	13 episodes	
2026	The Doomies	Jenny Lafrousse, Romy's Mom, Grannies	20 episodes	
2026	X-Men '97	Emma Frost	Episode: "A Voice to be Reckoned With"	
2026–present	Avatar: Seven Havens	Shilpa, Various voices		

=== Web series ===
List of appearances in web shows and series
Year	Title	Role	Notes	Source
2018–2019	Kuroba	Mari (voice)	Animation; 1st Voice	
2023	Candela Obscura	Dr. Jinnah Basar	Actual play; 3 episodes	

=== Film ===
List of voice performances in film
Year	Title	Role	Notes	Source
2018	The Laws of the Universe Part I	Zamza	English dub	
2020	Batman: Death in the Family	Talia al Ghul, Reporter	Direct-to-video	
2022	Catwoman: Hunted	Talia al Ghul, Nosferata, Interpol Commando	Direct-to-video	
2022	Beavis and Butt-Head Do the Universe	Butt-Head Fantasy Woman #1		
2023	Mortal Kombat Legends: Cage Match	Jataaka	Direct-to-video	
2023	Urkel Saves Santa: the Movie	Suli	Direct-to-video	
2023	Godzilla Minus One	Sumiko Ōta	English dub	
2023	Craig Before the Creek	Gala, Shannon the Scout, Tattoo		
2024	Watchmen Chapter 2	Hira Manish, Newscaster	Direct-to-video	

=== Video games ===
List of voice performances in video games
Year	Title	Role	Notes	Source
2016	Blade & Soul	Soha, Jinsoyung, Sunyung	English dub	
2016	Uncharted 4: A Thief's End	French Auction Guest, Additional voices		
2016	Titanfall 2	Lifeboat & Systems AI		
2017	Final Fantasy XV	Townspeople	English dub	
2019	Apex Legends	AI announcer, Narrator		
2019	Crackdown 3	Additional voices		
2019	League of Legends	Kayle		
2019	Fallout 76: Wild Appalachia	ARIC-4, Nia		
2019	Eliza	Rae		
2019	Until You Fall	Runesmith		
2019	Borderlands 3	Amara		
2019	Rage 2: Rise of the Ghosts	Eden HQ AI, Metro Station Guard, Metro Station Civilian		
2019	Destiny 2: Shadowkeep	Guardian: Exo Female		
2019	Indivisible	Thorani		
2019	Call of Duty: Modern Warfare	Ousa		
2019	Shenmue III	Li Feng, Niao Sun	English dub	
2020	Maneater	Female NPCs		
2020	Destiny 2: Beyond Light	Player Guardian Female		
2021	Legends of Runeterra	Taliyah		
2021	Psychonauts 2	Terryl		
2021	Shin Megami Tensei V	Cleopatra		
2022	Destiny 2: The Witch Queen	Player Guardian Female		
2022	Marvel's Avengers	Jane Foster / The Mighty Thor		
2022	Gotham Knights	Noor Rashid		
2023	Destiny 2: Lightfall	Player Guardian Female		
2024	Suicide Squad: Kill the Justice League	Wonder Woman		
2024	Destiny 2: The Final Shape	Player Guardian Female		
2024	Arknights	Kestrel		
2025	Date Everything!	Farya		
2025	Borderlands 4	Amara		
2026	God of War Sons of Sparta	Circe		

=== Live action ===
List of performances in live-action
Year	Title	Role	Notes	Source
2018	How to Get Away with Murder	Reporter 1	Episode: "It Was the Worst Day of My Life"	
2018	Living Biblically	Female Actor		
2018	I Feel Bad	Alexa	Episode: "I Get Sick of Being Needed"	
2019	Magnum P.I.	Fariha	Episode: "Spoiler Alert"	
2019	The Politician	Reporter	Episode: "Gone Girl"	
2020	Lucifer	Dr. Subia	Episode: "Spoiler Alert"	

== Awards and nominations ==
Year	Awards	Category	Nominated for	Result	Ref.
2019	Voice Arts Awards	Outstanding Promo Campaign - TV or Web, Best Voiceover	Fox Sports FIFA Women's World Cup 2019	Nominated	
2019	Voice Arts Awards	Outstanding Animation Character - TV or Web, Best Voiceover	Young Justice: Outsiders - Halo	Won	
2019	Voice Arts Awards	Outstanding Body of Work, Best Voice Actor	—N/a	Won	
