= Aaron Blabey =

Australian author and former actor (born 1974)

- Born: 1 January 1974 (age 52); Bendigo, Victoria, Australia
- Occupations: Children's author; executive producer; illustrator; artist; designer; actor
- Spouse: Kirstie Hutton (m. 2000; div. 2026) Tye Wilson (nee Cattanach) (m. 2026)
- Children: 2
- Writing career
- Years active: 1989–2005 (actor); 2006–present (children's author)
- Notable works: Pig the Pug series The Bad Guys series Thelma the Unicorn series
- Website: aaronblabey.com

Aaron Blabey (born 1 January 1974) is an Australian author of children's books, and a former actor. He is best known as the author and illustrator of three best-selling children's series; Pig the Pug – a picture book series about a rude, selfish, mean-spirited little dog named Pig, The Bad Guys – a The New York Times #1 best-selling graphic novel series for junior readers about a gang of scary-looking animals trying to change their bad reputations, and Thelma the Unicorn – a second picture book series about a plain little pony who pretends to be a unicorn.

As of November 2026, Blabey has around 65 million books in print and his books have spent over 120 weeks on The New York Times best-seller list. The Bad Guys first reached #1 on the list on 3 July 2019.

On 22 April 2022, an animated movie adaptation of The Bad Guys from DreamWorks Animation starring Sam Rockwell, Awkwafina, Marc Maron, Craig Robinson, and Anthony Ramos premiered in the United States. Blabey served as an executive producer on the movie with Patrick Hughes and Etan Cohen. The movie opened at #1 at the U.S. box office and was the fifth-highest-grossing animated film of 2022, earning $250 million worldwide, followed by a sequel in 2025 with the aforementioned cast all reprising their roles from the first film, which opened at #2 at the U.S. box office and grossed $240 million worldwide.

In May 2019, it was announced that Netflix was developing a movie-musical adaptation of Thelma the Unicorn with Blabey again serving as executive producer. The film released onto the service in 2024.

Until 2005, Blabey was also an actor. In the field of acting, he is probably best known for his lead roles in two television dramedies, 1994's The Damnation of Harvey McHugh, for which he won an Australian Film Institute Award, and 2003's CrashBurn, before retiring from performance in 2005.

== Personal life ==
Blabey was born on 1 January 1974, in Bendigo, Australia. He married the actress and speech pathologist Kirstie Hutton in April 2000. They have two sons. The couple separated in April 2022 and divorced in October 2026. Blabey became engaged in December 2022 to artist Tye Wilson (nee Cattanach) and the couple have announced their upcoming wedding on the 22nd of December 2026.

Blabey supports The Alannah and Madeline Foundation, who work to protect children from violence.

== Career ==
=== Acting ===
Blabey appeared in various television and film roles throughout the 1990s and 2000s and took part in several theatrical productions.

Besides his 1994 award for acting in a lead role, the Australian Film Institute also nominated him in 2000 for his guest-starring role in the series Stingers.

=== Art ===
From the mid-2000s, Blabey turned his attention away from acting and towards painting and created six separate solo exhibitions across Australia between 2004 and 2006.

=== Books ===
The first of these, Pearl Barley and Charlie Parsley, was published in July 2007. In 2008, the book received a Children's Book Council of Australia Award in the council's Early Childhood category. The book was also shortlisted for the CBCA's Crichton Award (given to new illustrators), The NSW Premier's Literature Awards – The Patricia Wrightson Award, and the Children's Peace Literature Award. In 2008, the book was also included on the Notable Book list from the Smithsonian Institution.

His second book, Sunday Chutney, was published in 2008 and shortlisted for the CBCA Picture Book of the Year 2009 and the Australian Book Industry Awards 2009.

His third book, Stanley Paste, was a CBCA Notable Book in the Picture Book category in 2010 as was The Ghost of Miss Annabel Spoon in 2012, which was also selected as a prestigious White Raven of 2012 by the International Youth Library in Munich, Germany. The Ghost of Miss Annabel Spoon also won the Patricia Wrightson Award in 2013 New South Wales Premier's Literary Awards and the 2013 Children's Peace Literature Award. In early 2014, Nick Cave selected The Ghost of Miss Annabel Spoon to record for the Story Box Library website.

His fifth book, The Dreadful Fluff won the Best Designed Children's Cover of the Year by the Australian Publishers Association in 2013, which also saw the release of his critically acclaimed sixth title, Noah Dreary.

This was followed by a picture book for adults entitled Babies Don't Suck – a guide for expectant new fathers.

Blabey's seventh children's book, The Brothers Quibble, which deals with sibling rivalry, was chosen as the National Simultaneous Storytime Book of 2015, and was read by over 500,000 children on 27 May 2015.

=== Pig the Pug, Thelma the Unicorn and Piranhas Don't Eat Bananas ===
In 2014 Blabey signed a three-book deal with Scholastic Australia beginning with Pig the Pug, a humorous picture book about a rude, selfish, mean-spirited dog (pug), who always gets into arguments and even fights with his rival playmate, the friendly, polite-mannered, good-hearted Trevor (dachshund). The book was an immediate hit in Australia and has since been translated into many languages and published around the world. It spawned a series of Pig books including Pig the Fibber (2015), Pig the Winner (2016), Pig the Elf (2016), Pig the Star (2017), Pig the Grub (2018), Pig the Tourist (2019), Pig the Slob (Blob) (2020), Pig the Monster (2021) and the final instalment Pig the Rebel (2022).

The Pig books have sold millions of copies around the world, predominantly in the US and Australia.

The second book released from his initial three-book-deal was Thelma the Unicorn. This picture book – about a plain little pony who dreams of becoming a unicorn – has also become a bestseller. In combination with its sequel The Return of Thelma the Unicorn, it has sold millions of copies as well.

In June 2019, it was announced that Netflix was developing an animated musical movie adaptation of Thelma the Unicorn, to be directed by Jared Hess (who wrote the script with his wife Jerusha) and Lynn Wang with animation provided by Mikros Image Montreal. Blabey served as an executive producer on the project. The film adaptation released on 17 May 2024.

=== The Bad Guys ===
2015 also saw the release of the first two instalments of Blabey's best-selling graphic novel series for junior readers, The Bad Guys. The humorous series follows the adventures of a gang of scary-looking, dangerous animals – Mr. Wolf, Mr. Snake, Mr. Shark and Mr. Piranha – who attempt to change their bad reputations by performing good deeds.

In January 2018, The Bad Guys hit The New York Times Best Seller list (Children's Series) and have since remained there for many weeks. After 36 weeks on the list, The Bad Guys finally reached the number one spot on 3 July 2019.

As of December 2022, there are over 25 million Bad Guys books in print around the world and the series has spent over 120 weeks on the New York Times Bestseller List.

On 9 March 2018 it was announced that an animated feature film adaptation of The Bad Guys was in development at DreamWorks Animation – with a screenplay by Etan Cohen. On 17 October 2019 the project went into production with a scheduled release date of 17 September 2021. Due to the COVID-19 pandemic, the release date was pushed back to 22 April 2022. The movie is directed by veteran animator Pierre Perifel in his feature directorial debut and produced by Damon Ross and Rebecca Huntley and written by Etan Cohen, who also serves as an executive producer on the project with both Blabey (the book's author) and Patrick Hughes. It stars Sam Rockwell (Mr. Wolf), Awkwafina (Ms. Tarantula), Marc Maron (Mr. Snake), Craig Robinson (Mr. Shark) and Anthony Ramos (Mr. Piranha).

Whilst promoting the movie in Los Angeles in April 2022, Blabey appeared on Maron’s podcast WTF and discussed his journey to that point with Maron who voiced Mr Snake in the film. A Netflix-exclusive holiday prequel, subtitled "A Very Bad Holiday", was released on 30 November 2023, followed by a Halloween prequel special in 2024 and a prequel series premiering in November 2025.

In March 2022, a month before the film was released in the US, Perifel said that he would love to do a sequel. Two years later, DreamWorks Animation officially confirmed a sequel, The Bad Guys 2, and was released in the United States on 1 August 2025. Perifel returned to direct and JP Sans, who served as head of character animation on the previous film, also returned co-direct, with the cast reprising their roles.

=== Cat on the Run ===
In January 2022, about 3 months before the release of the film adaptation of The Bad Guys, Blabey announced that a new book series called Cat on the Run was in development and it would be released in 2023. The series takes place in the same universe as The Bad Guys, and it follows the world’s #1 cat video star Princess Beautiful as she attempts to prove her innocence after being framed for a crime she didn’t commit.

=== Game of Pets and The Awfuls ===
In March 2025, about 5 months after The Bad Guys series ended and 2 months before the release of the last Cat On The Run book, Blabey announced an eight-figure deal with Macmillan Publishers to publish two new series with seven titles in total.

The first in the two-series-deal, called Game of Pets, with its first book releasing on 29 September 2026, follows an 11-year-old boy named Griff as he gets told by a talking axolotl named Bob that he is the only one who can save the world from a diabolical intergalactic game show. In October 2026, an animated film adaptation was announced from Amazon MGM Studios, Rideback and Foundation Media Partners.

The second in the two-series-deal, called The Awfuls, will follow a top secret, experimental weapon that falls into a hands of a middle schooler.

=== Art direction ===
Blabey has also worked as a staff writer at a major advertising agency and spent two years as a lecturer at a prominent Sydney design college.

== Honours and awards ==
- 1994, Australian Film Institute Award, Best Actor in a Leading Role in a Television Drama, The Damnation of Harvey McHugh, episode: "Spay Misty For Me."
- 2008, Children's Book of the Year Award: Early Childhood, Pearl Barley and Charlie Parsley.
- 2012, White Ravens Award by the International Youth Library, The Ghost of Miss Annabel Spoon.
- 2012, National Literacy Ambassador
- 2012 - 2015, Ambassador for The Alannah and Madeline Foundation.
- 2013, New South Wales Premier's Literary Awards, Patricia Wrightson Prize for Children's Literature, The Ghost of Miss Annabel Spoon.
- 2013, Best Designed Children's Cover of the Year by the Australian Publishers Association, The Dreadful Fluff.
- 2013, The Children's Peace Literature Award from the Australian Psychological Society – Psychologists For Peace, The Ghost of Miss Annabel Spoon.
- 2016, INDIE books award for Best Children's Book, The Bad Guys

== List of works ==
As author and illustrator:

=== Pig the Pug ===
#	Title	First published	Publisher
1	Pig The Pug	2014	Scholastic Australia
2	Pig the Fibber	2015	Scholastic Australia
3	Pig the Winner	2016	Scholastic Australia
4	Pig the Elf	2016	Scholastic Australia
5	Pig the Star	2017	Scholastic Australia
6	Pig the Grub	2018	Scholastic Australia
7	Pig the Tourist	2019	Scholastic Australia
8	Pig the Slob (Blob)	2020	Scholastic Australia
9	Pig the Monster	2021	Scholastic Australia
10	Pig the Rebel	2022	Scholastic Australia

=== Thelma the Unicorn ===
#	Title	First published	Publisher
1	Thelma the Unicorn	2015	Scholastic Australia
2	The Return of Thelma the Unicorn	2019	Scholastic Australia

=== The Bad Guys ===
#	Title	First published	Publisher
1	The Bad Guys: Episode 1	2015 (Black and White), 2022 (Full Colour)	Scholastic Australia
2	The Bad Guys: Episode 2: Mission Unpluckable	2015 (Black and White), 2022 (Full Colour)	Scholastic Australia
3	The Bad Guys: Episode 3: The Furball Strikes Back	2016 (Black and White), 2023 (Full Colour)	Scholastic Australia
4	The Bad Guys: Episode 4: Attack of the Zittens	2016 (Black and White), 2023 (Full Colour)	Scholastic Australia
5	The Bad Guys: Episode 5: Intergalactic Gas	2017 (Black and White), 2025 (Full Colour)	Scholastic Australia
6	The Bad Guys: Episode 6: Alien vs. Bad Guys	2017 (Black and White), 2025 (Full Colour)	Scholastic Australia
7	The Bad Guys: Episode 7: Do-You-Think-He-Saurus?	2018 (Black and White), 2026 (Full Colour)	Scholastic Australia
8	The Bad Guys: Episode 8: Superbad	2018 (Black and White), 2027 (Full Colour)	Scholastic Australia
9	The Bad Guys: Episode 9: The Big Bad Wolf	2019	Scholastic Australia
10	The Bad Guys: Episode 10: The Baddest Day Ever	2019	Scholastic Australia
11	The Bad Guys: Episode 11: Dawn of the Underlord	2020	Scholastic Australia
12	The Bad Guys: Episode 12: The One?!	2020	Scholastic Australia
13	The Bad Guys: Episode 13: Cut to the Chase	2021	Scholastic Australia
14	The Bad Guys: Episode 14: They're Bee-hind You!	2021	Scholastic Australia
15	The Bad Guys: Episode 15: Open Wide and Say Arrrgh!	2022	Scholastic Australia
16	The Bad Guys: Episode 16: The Others?!	2022	Scholastic Australia
17	The Bad Guys: Episode 17: Let the Games Begin!	2023	Scholastic Australia
18	The Bad Guys: Episode 18: Look Who's Talking!	2023	Scholastic Australia
19	The Bad Guys: Episode 19: The Serpent and the Beast	2024	Scholastic Australia
20	The Bad Guys: Episode 20: One Last Thing	2024	Scholastic Australia

=== Cat on the Run ===
Cat on the Run is a spinoff to The Bad Guys.

#	Title	First published	Publisher
1	Cat on the Run Episode 1: Cat of Death!	2023	Scholastic Australia
2	Cat on the Run Episode 2: Cucumber Madness!	2024	Scholastic Australia
3	Cat on the Run Episode 3: Hidden Layers!	2025	Scholastic Australia

=== Game of Pets ===
#	Title	First published	Publisher
1	Game of Pets Book 1: The Boy Who Knew Too Much	29 September 2026	MacMillan Publishers (UK and Australia); Odd Dot (US)
2	Game of Pets Book 2: Farmageddon	1 June 2027	MacMillan Publishers (UK and Australia); Odd Dot (US)

=== The Awfuls ===
#	Title	First published	Publisher
1	Untitled first The Awfuls book	TBA	Macmillan Publishers (UK and Australia); Odd Dot (US)

=== Other works ===
Title	First published	Publisher
Pearl Barley and Charlie Parsley	2007	Penguin Books Australia
Sunday Chutney	2008	Penguin Books Australia
Stanley Paste	2009	Penguin Books Australia
The Ghost of Miss Annabel Spoon	2011	Penguin Books Australia
The Dreadful Fluff	2012	Penguin Books Australia
Noah Dreary	2013	Penguin Books Australia
The Brothers Quibble	2014	Penguin Books Australia
Babies Don't Suck	2014	Pan Books Australia
Piranhas Don't Eat Bananas	2015	Scholastic Australia
I Need A Hug	2015	Scholastic Australia
Don't Call Me Bear	2016	Scholastic Australia
Busting!	2017	Scholastic Australia
Guff	2017	Penguin Books Australia

== Filmography ==
=== Film ===
Year	Film	Role	Notes
1996	Turning April	Leif	Feature film
1996	Mr. Reliable	Bruce Morrison	Feature film
1998	Pentuphouse	Dale	Short film
1999	Erskineville Kings	Trunny	Feature film
2001	Mullet	Terry	Feature film
2004	Human Touch	David	Feature film
2006	The 9:13	Thunder	Short film

=== Television ===
Year	Film	Role	Notes
1991; 1995; 1996	G.P.	Sean Bartells / Jim Mayhew / Sean	TV series, 3 episodes
1993	Phoenix		TV series, season 2, episode 4: "The Return"
1994	Blue Heelers	Robbie Davies	TV series, season 1, episode 42: "The First Stone"
1994	The Damnation of Harvey McHugh	Harvey McHugh	Miniseries, 13 episodes, Australian Film Institute Award for Best Actor in a Leading Role in a Television Drama
1995	Halifax f.p.	Tony Lobianco	TV series, season 1, episode 2: "Words Without Music"
1995	The Man from Snowy River	Jimmy Wilks	TV series, season 2, episode 12: "The Recruit"
1996	Twisted Tales	Nick	TV series, season 1, episode 1: "The Confident Man"
1996–1997	Medivac	Danny Haywood	TV series, 2 episodes
1997	Fallen Angels	Jim Phelps	TV series, season 1, episode 6: "All Things Bright and Beautiful"
1997	Wildside	Warren Beckett	TV series, 4 episodes
1997; 1999	Water Rats	Doug Porter / Gary Travis	TV series, 4 episodes
1998	Day of the Roses	Dr John White	Miniseries, 2 episodes
1999	All Saints	Scott Lacey	TV series, season 2, episode 36: "The Ties That Bind"
2000	Grass Roots	Sandy Maxwell	TV series, season 1, episode 5: "January to April"
2000	Stingers	Michael Callum	TV series, season 3, episode 17: "Second Chance"; Nominated for Australian Film Institute Award for Best Performance by an Actor in a Guest Role in a Television Drama Series
2003	CrashBurn	Ben Harfield	TV series, season 1, 13 episodes
2004	Through My Eyes: The Lindy Chamberlain Story	Kirkham	Miniseries, 2 episodes
2005	MDA	Luke Rodman	TV series, 4 episodes
