= The Bad Guys 2 =

2025 American film by Pierre Perifel

- Theatrical release poster
- Directed by: Pierre Perifel
- Screenplay by: Yoni Brenner; Etan Cohen
- Based on: The Bad Guys by Aaron Blabey
- Produced by: Damon Ross
- Starring: Sam Rockwell; Marc Maron; Awkwafina; Craig Robinson; Anthony Ramos; Zazie Beetz; Danielle Brooks; Natasha Lyonne; Maria Bakalova; Alex Borstein; Richard Ayoade; Lilly Singh
- Cinematography: Théophile Bondoux
- Edited by: Jesse Averna
- Music by: Daniel Pemberton
- Production company: DreamWorks Animation
- Distributed by: Universal Pictures
- Release dates: July 24, 2025 (Argentina); August 1, 2025 (United States)
- Running time: 104 minutes
- Country: United States
- Language: English
- Budget: $80 million
- Box office: $240 million

The Bad Guys 2 (Note: Officially billed as DreamWorks The Bad Guys 2) is a 2025 American animated crime comedy film produced by DreamWorks Animation. The sequel to The Bad Guys (2022) and the second film of the Bad Guys franchise, loosely based on the children's book series The Bad Guys by Aaron Blabey, it was directed by Pierre Perifel and written by Yoni Brenner and Etan Cohen. The film stars Sam Rockwell, Marc Maron, Awkwafina, Craig Robinson, Anthony Ramos, Zazie Beetz, Alex Borstein, Richard Ayoade, and Lilly Singh, reprising their roles from the first film, with Danielle Brooks, Natasha Lyonne, and Maria Bakalova joining the cast. In the film, the Bad Guys are forced to come out of retirement and join forces with an all-female criminal squad to perform one last heist.

Perifel expressed interest on developing a sequel to The Bad Guys in March 2022, before the release of the first film in the United States. Two years later, DreamWorks Animation announced a sequel, with Perifel and the voice cast returning. Lyonne joined the cast in July 2024, with the involvement of Brooks and Bakalova being announced in November. Daniel Pemberton composed the score, returning from the previous film.

The Bad Guys 2 premiered in Argentina on July 24, 2025, before being released in the United States on August 1, by Universal Pictures. The film received positive reviews from critics and grossed $240 million.

== Plot ==
Following the defeat of Professor Marmalade and their release from prison, (Note: As depicted in The Bad Guys (2022)) the Bad Guys have reformed, but they struggle to fit into society. Wolf, Shark, Piranha, and Tarantula unsuccessfully apply for jobs while Snake is frequently absent from home. Wolf spends his time with Diane, and they grow closer but are unable to start a romantic relationship due to their public differences. Inspired by Diane to give people a reason to trust them, Wolf helps Misty Luggins, who is now a police commissioner, track down the Phantom Bandit, a new criminal known for being untraceable. They soon find evidence leading to the bandit being Snake, only to later realize that he was with his new girlfriend, a raven named Susan. In an attempt to expose the Phantom Bandit at a lucha libre wrestling tournament, the Bad Guys are framed by a wild boar for the Phantom Bandit's work. After escaping, Wolf calls Diane to maintain their innocence, and she agrees to help them. When Wolf returns to the others, he finds everyone but Susan unconscious before being tranquilised by the latter.

Upon waking up, the Bad Guys find themselves kidnapped by Susan, whose real name is Doom. She reveals that she works for a snow leopard named Kitty Kat, who is the Phantom Bandit, alongside Pigtail Petrova, the wild boar from the tournament. Kitty has a video revealing Diane as the Crimson Paw—her former criminal identity—and threatens to upload it unless the Bad Guys help her steal the experimental MOON-X rocket, which they reluctantly agree to. Meanwhile, Diane visits Marmalade in prison. He reveals that Kitty plans to use the International Space Station to steal all of the world's gold with MacGuffinite, a rare metal which can magnetize gold with great force.

The group begins their plan by successfully stealing the smartwatch of MOON-X's owner, Mr. Moon, at his wedding, and Kitty gives Wolf the footage on a flash drive as promised. The Bad Guys plan to expose Kitty to clear their names, but they are caught. Kitty uploads the footage to the internet and alerts the police of the Bad Guys' location. Diane confronts the Bad Girls before they board the rocket. Kitty tranquilizes Diane, who sneaks on board half-conscious. Luggins rearrests the Bad Guys but admits that she believes them and helps them board the rocket mid-launch via helicopter.

Upon learning the Bad Guys snuck aboard, Doom and Pigtail refuse to attack them, but Kitty threatens them and refuses to give up the plan, magnetizing the Earth's gold, along with a limousine containing a newly acquitted Marmalade. When Wolf reaches her, Kitty breaks the magnet's remote, but Wolf steals the smartwatch and maneuvers the rocket into the magnet, destroying it and returning the gold. An enraged Kitty attempts to murder Wolf for ruining her plan, but Diane recovers, attacks Kitty, and knocks her out. Wolf and Diane happily reunite and share their first kiss, while the Bad Guys regroup along with a reformed Doom and Pigtail as the space station plummets towards Earth. After crash-landing, the Bad Girls are arrested; Kitty is imprisoned while Doom and Pigtail are sentenced to community service. Luggins fakes the deaths of the Bad Guys and Diane to employ them as secret agents for the International Super-Galactic League of Protectors (ISGLOP). Meanwhile, Marmalade transforms his limo into a spaceship and flies into space to his home planet.

== Voice cast ==
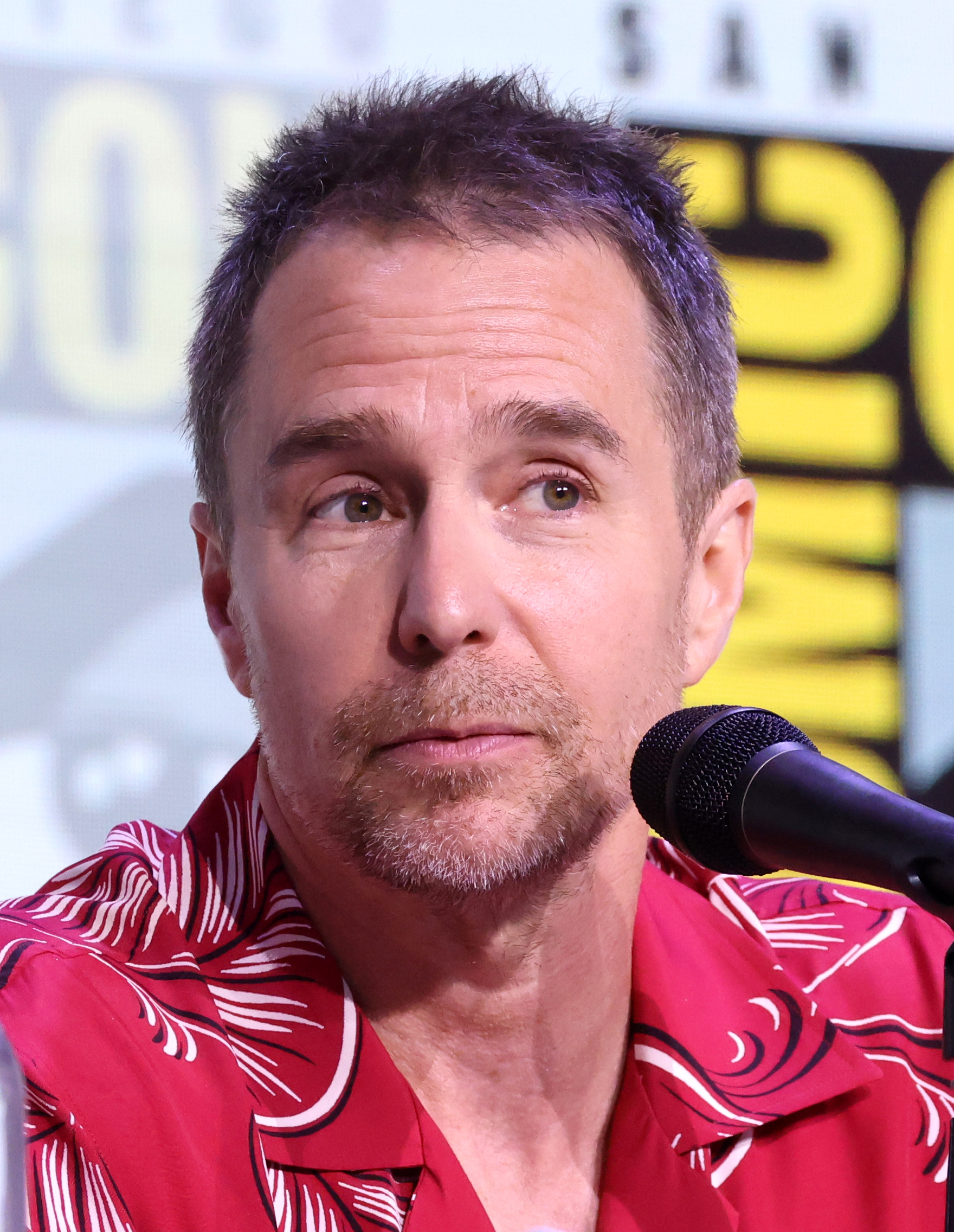
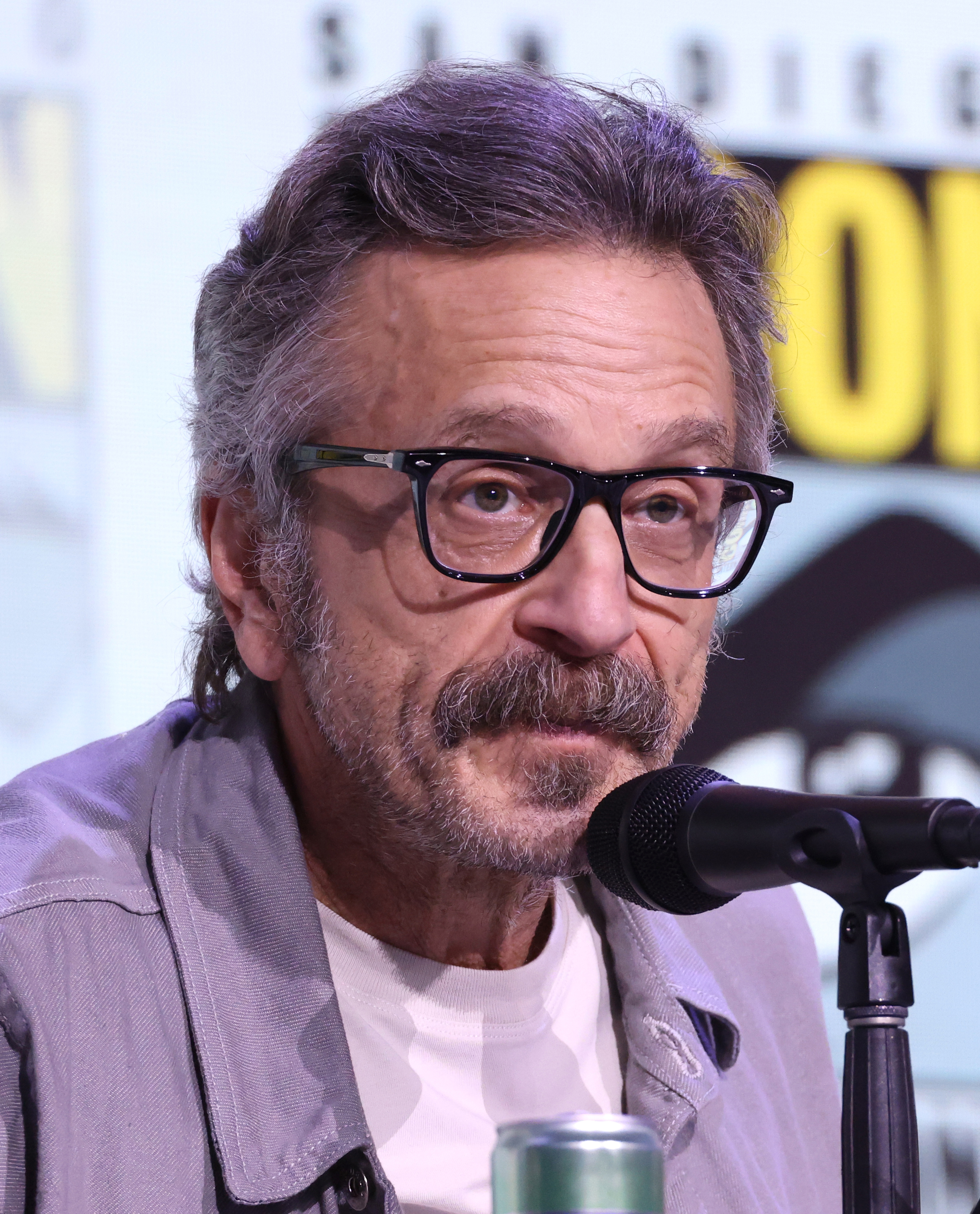
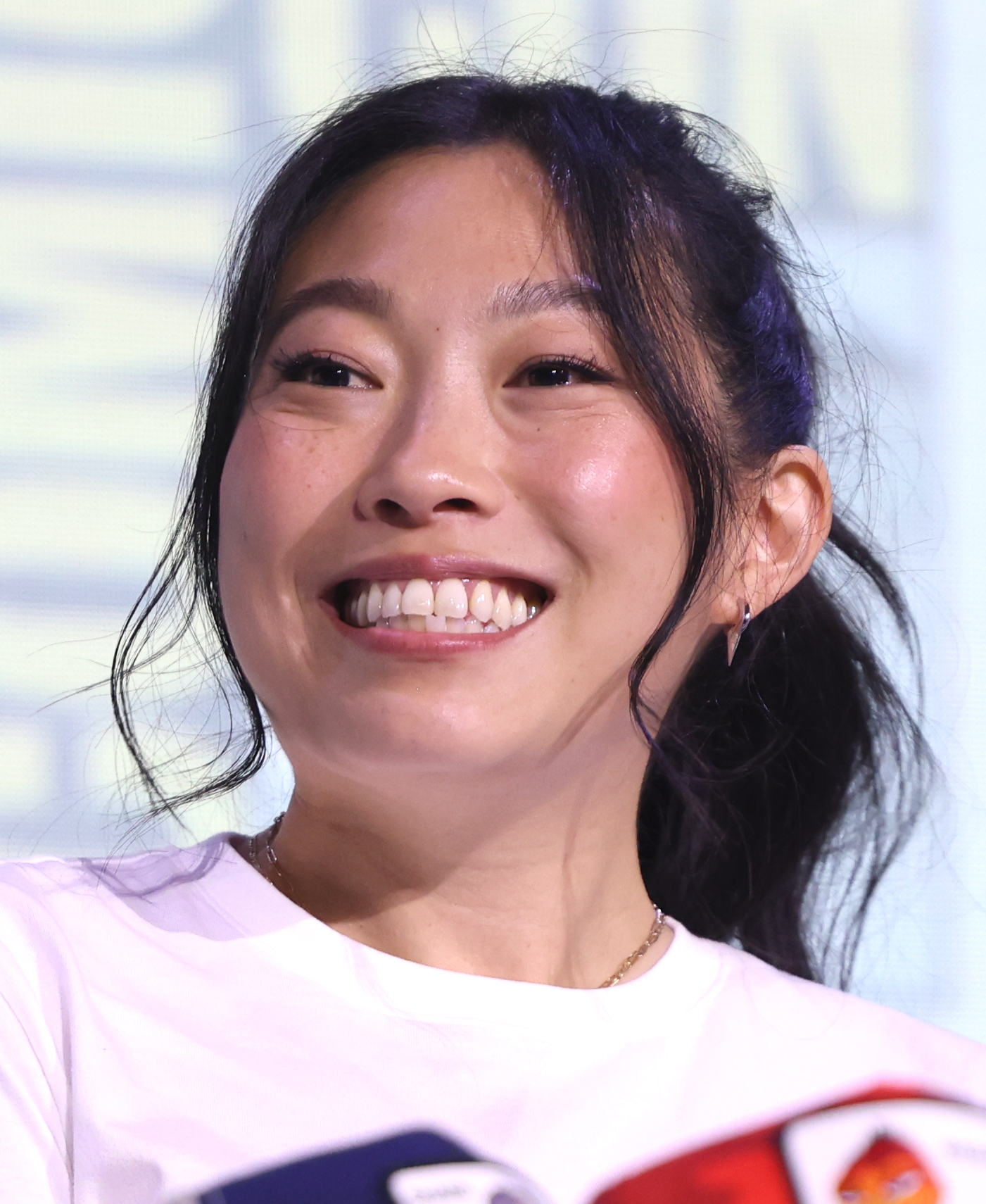
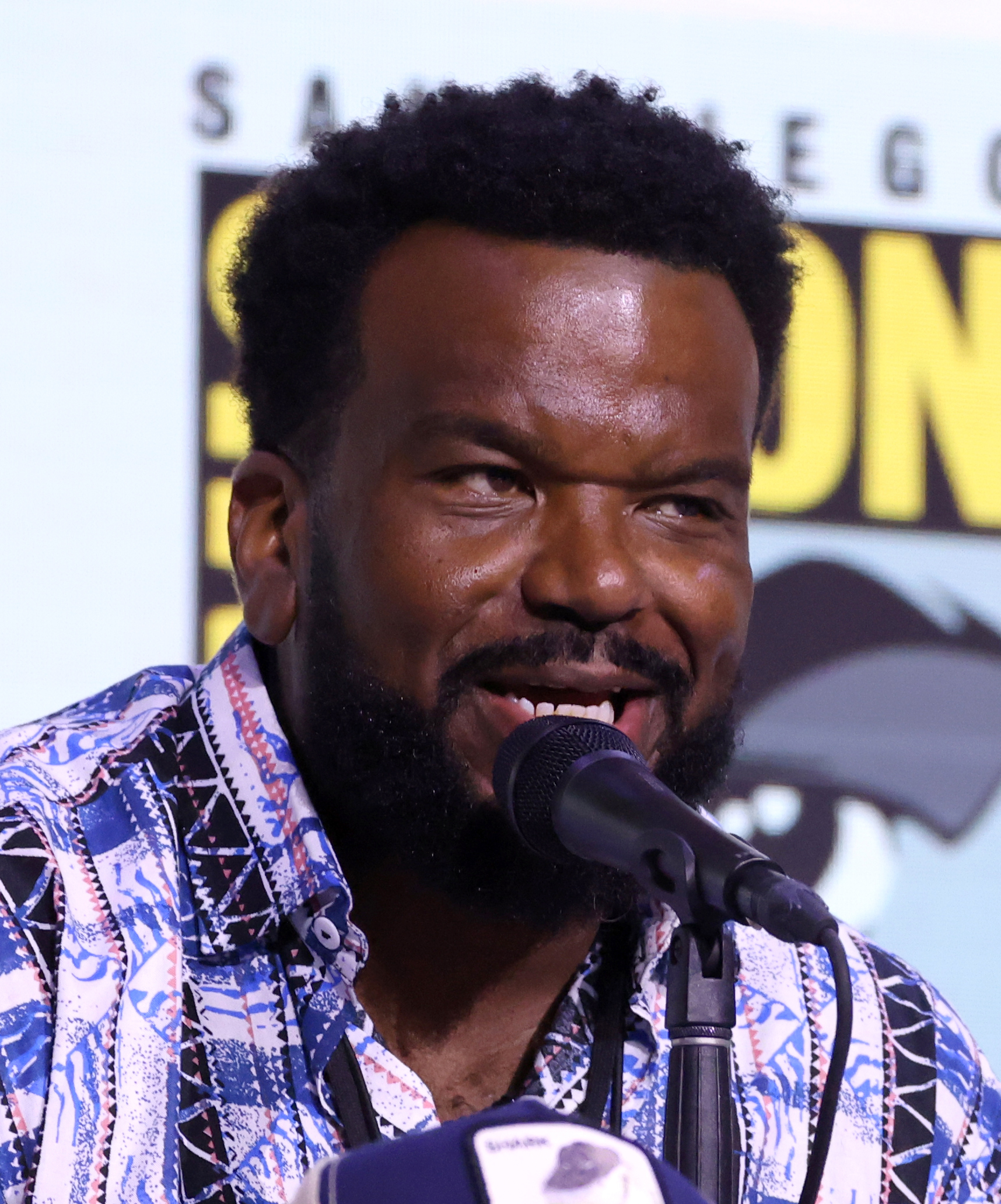
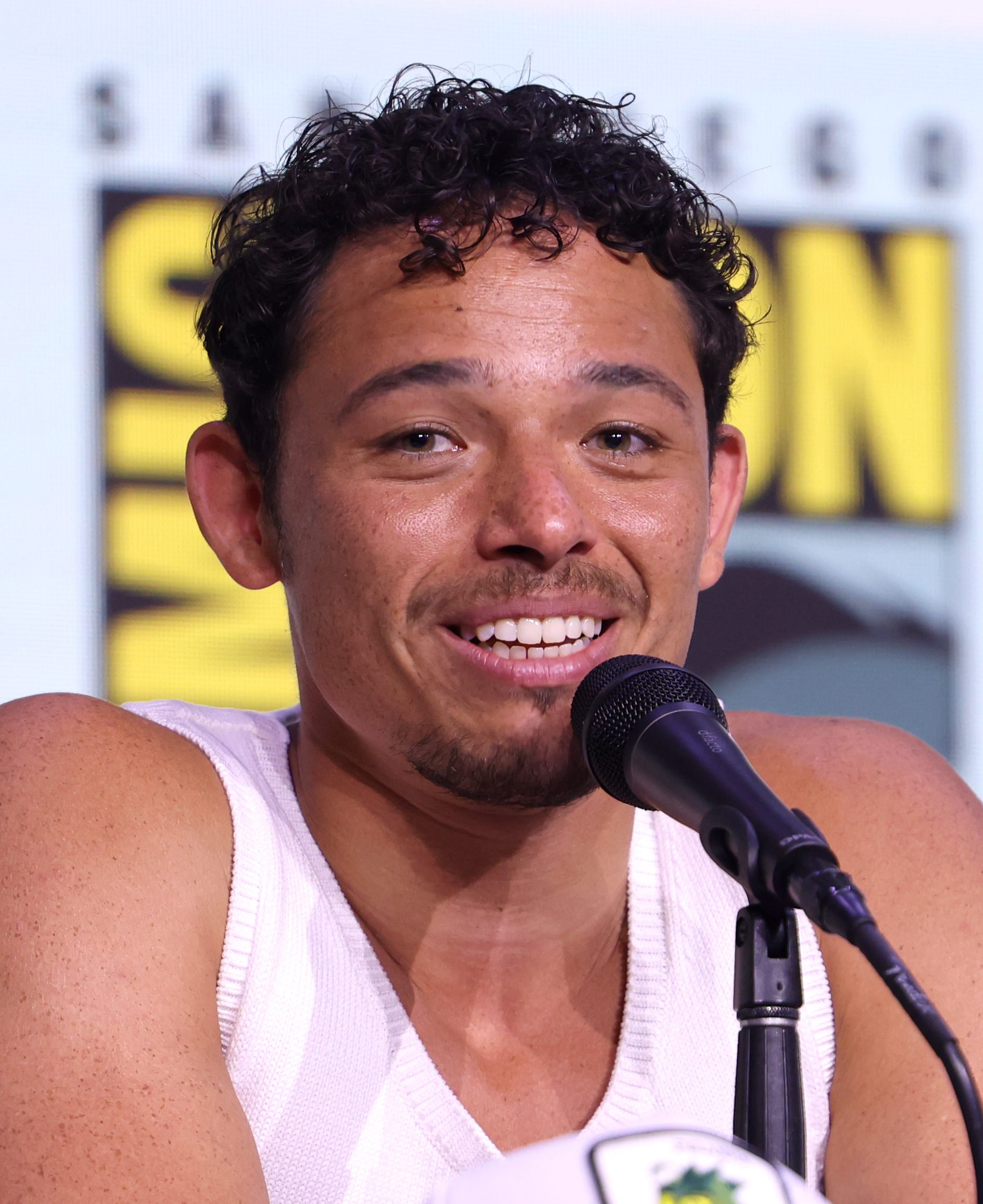
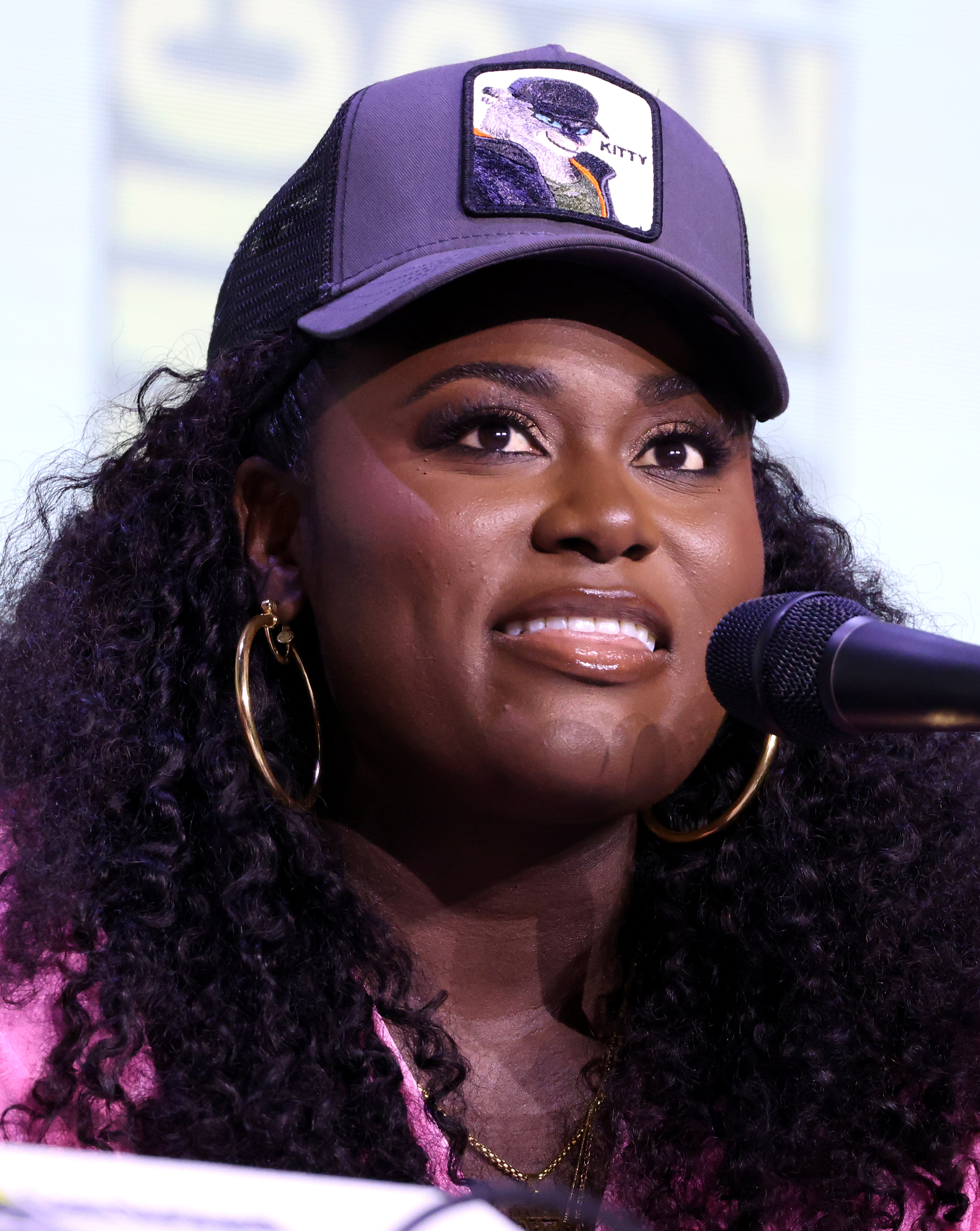
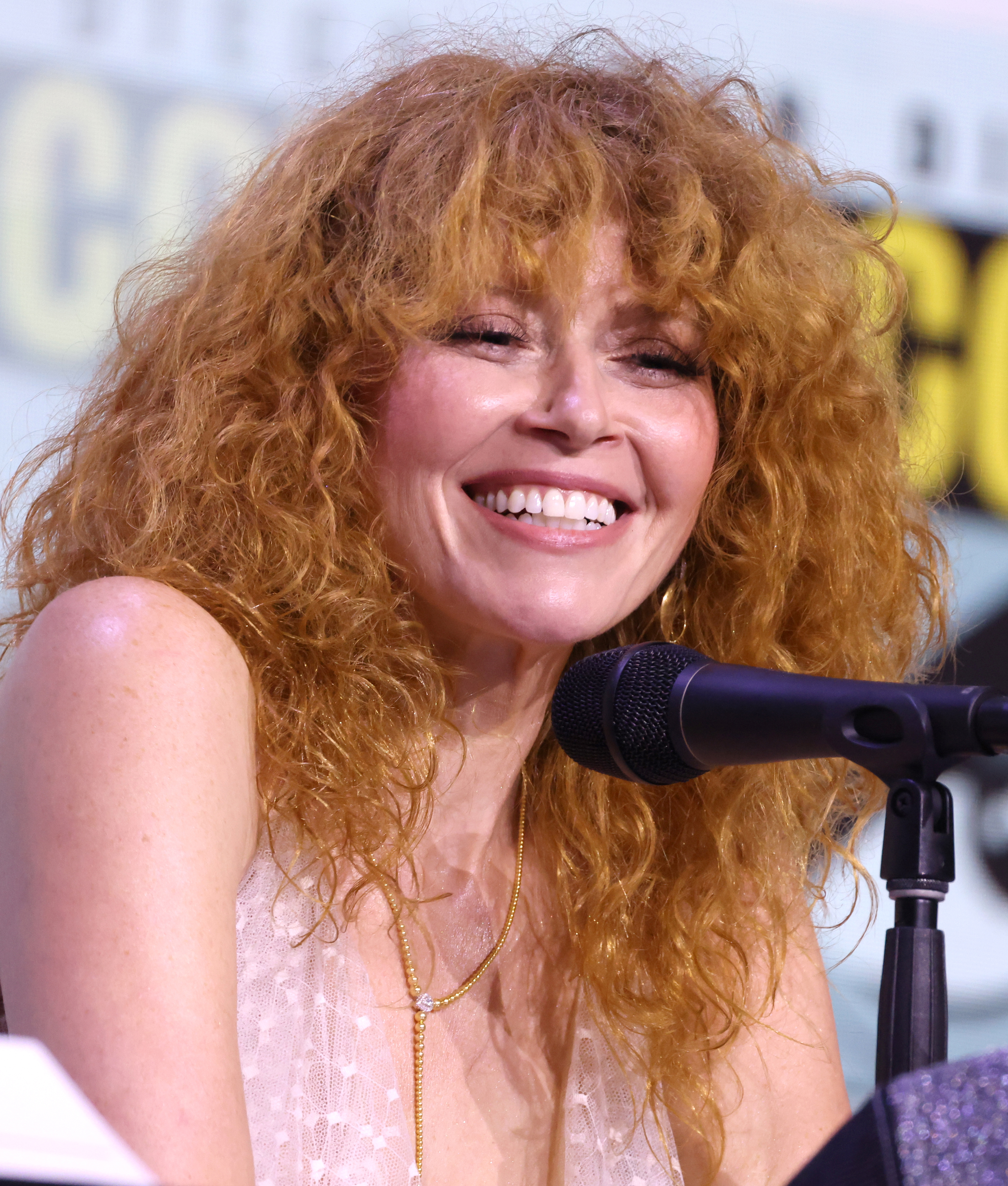
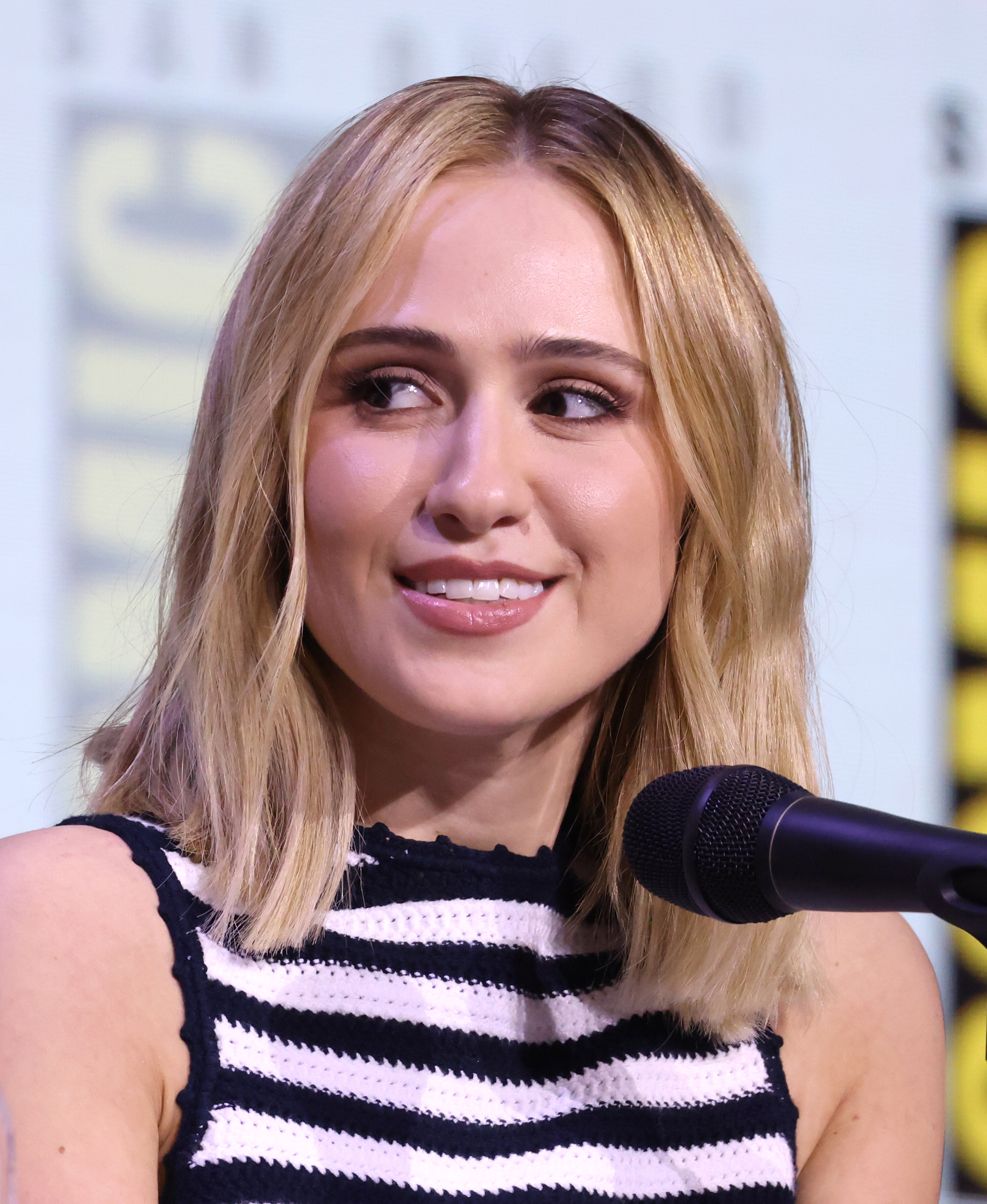
Clockwise from top left: Main cast members Sam Rockwell, Marc Maron, Awkwafina, Craig Robinson, Anthony Ramos, Danielle Brooks, Natasha Lyonne and Maria Bakalova promoting the film at the 2025 San Diego Comic-Con
- Sam Rockwell as Mr. Wolf, the pickpocketer, getaway driver, and leader of the Bad Guys
- Marc Maron as Mr. Snake, Wolf's best friend, and second-in-command and safecracker of the Bad Guys
- Awkwafina as Ms. Tarantula / "Webs", the Bad Guys' hacker
- Craig Robinson as Mr. Shark, the Bad Guys' master of disguise
- Anthony Ramos as Mr. Piranha, the muscle of the Bad Guys
- Zazie Beetz as Diane Foxington, a red fox, who serves as the state governor and formerly operated as a criminal dubbed the Crimson Paw, and Wolf's girlfriend
- Danielle Brooks as Kitty Kat, a snow leopard, who is the leader of the Bad Girls
- Natasha Lyonne as Doom / "Susan", a raven, a member of the Bad Girls, and Snake's girlfriend
- Maria Bakalova as Pigtail Petrova, a wild boar who is a member of the Bad Girls
  - Bakalova also voices Pigtail in the Bulgarian dub.
- Alex Borstein as Misty Luggins, the human chief-turned-police commissioner
- Richard Ayoade as Professor Marmalade, a villainous, highly-intelligent, British-accented guinea pig and the Bad Guys' nemesis
- Lilly Singh as Tiffany Fluffit, a human news reporter
- Omid Djalili as Mr. Soliman, a billionaire from Cairo, Egypt whom the Bad Guys stole their iconic car from
- Colin Jost as Jeremiah Moon, CEO of Moon-X who owns the rocket that the Bad Girls steal
- Jaime Camil as Handsome Jorge Garcia, a champion luchador wrestler
- Hugo Savinovich as the lucha announcer
- Michael Godere as Craig, the manager of a bank where Wolf interviews for a job
- Kelly Stables as Maureen, Diane's secretary
  - Katherine Ryan voices Maureen in the British dub.
- Jorge R. Gutierrez as a lucha spectator

== Production ==
=== Development ===
In March 2022, a month before The Bad Guys was released in the United States, director Pierre Perifel said that he would "love to do a sequel". On March 26, 2024, a sequel was confirmed by DreamWorks Animation, with Perifel returning to direct and JP Sans, who served as head of character animation on the previous film, co-directing, making this his directorial debut. Sam Rockwell, Marc Maron, Awkwafina, Craig Robinson, Anthony Ramos, Richard Ayoade, Zazie Beetz, Alex Borstein, and Lilly Singh all reprise their roles from the previous film. On July 13, 2024, it was announced that Natasha Lyonne had been cast in the sequel. Maria Bakalova and Danielle Brooks were announced as part of the cast in November.

=== Animation ===
On October 6, 2023, the then-unannounced film was revealed to be animated by Sony Pictures Imageworks. Imageworks would operate as a partner studio with DreamWorks utilizing a "mixed production model". Pre-production was done in-house at DreamWorks along with approximately 50% of the asset build and one hour of production, while Imageworks handled the other 50% of asset builds and 20 minutes of shot production. All animation was finished by May 7, 2025.

== Music ==
The Bad Guys 2 (Original Motion Picture Soundtrack)

Film score by Daniel Pemberton
- Released: August 1, 2025
- Genre: Score
- Label: Back Lot Music

Daniel Pemberton chronology
Eddington (2025)	The Bad Guys 2 (Original Motion Picture Soundtrack) (2025)	Project Hail Mary (2026)

Singles from The Bad Guys 2 (Original Motion Picture Soundtrack)
- 1. "GOODLIFE" Released: July 11, 2025; 2. "Taking Everything" Released: July 25, 2025

Daniel Pemberton returns to compose the film's score. Rag'n'Bone Man and WizTheMc performed an original song for the film, titled "GOODLIFE", which was released as a single on July 11, 2025, while another original song titled "Taking Everything", performed by Busta Rhymes, was released on July 25. The official soundtrack was released by Back Lot Music on August 1, 2025, the same day as the film's theatrical release in the United States.

Additionally, "Espresso" by Sabrina Carpenter, "iDance & Rule It" by Luciana, "Shake Your Groove Thing" by Peaches & Herb, a rendition of the Chicken dance performed by The Starsound Orchestra, a remix of Cardi B, J Balvin and Bad Bunny's "I Like It" by Dillon Francis, "Crimson and Clover" by Tommy James and the Shondells, Felix Mendelssohn's "Wedding March", "Frontline" by Mo'Kalamity and The Wizards, "Black Rose" by Coi Leray, "Purple Hat" by Sofi Tukker and "Rebel Rebel" by David Bowie are heard in the film but not included in the soundtrack album. Furthermore, like its predecessor, "Bad Guy" by Billie Eilish was only featured in the trailers.

=== Track listing ===
All music is composed by Daniel Pemberton, except as noted.

No.	Title	Writer(s)	Producer	Length
1.	"GOODLIFE" (performed by Rag'n'Bone Man ft. WizTheMc)	Pemberton; Gary GoSanele; David Sydow	Pemberton	3:08
2.	"Taking Everything" (performed by Busta Rhymes)	Trevor Smith; Pemberton	Pemberton	3:23
3.	"Cairo, Five Years Ago"			2:24
4.	"Bottom of the List"			2:40
5.	"The Phantom Bandit"			1:26
6.	"Parting Gift"			1:00
7.	"The Evidence Board"			1:46
8.	"Give Them a Reason"			1:09
9.	"Such a Snake"			0:46
10.	"Lucha Lucha"			2:25
11.	"A New Challenger"			1:06
12.	"Hot Dog Running"			1:53
13.	"Cops on Case"			1:00
14.	"Someone Setting Us Up"			1:35
15.	"Gear Up, Lay Low"			1:10
16.	"Kitty Kat Crew"			1:47
17.	"Crashing Down"			2:00
18.	"Rocket Con"			1:27
19.	"S.U.C.M. Prisoner"			1:24
20.	"Here Comes the Bride"			1:05
21.	"The Wedding Plan"			4:02
22.	"Eyes Up Cowboy"			1:23
23.	"Connect 4"			1:16
24.	"Target Acquired"			0:54
25.	"Magnet vs. Upload"			2:43
26.	"Fox Fight"			3:03
27.	"Cops Set It Up"			0:45
28.	"You Believe Us"			1:26
29.	"MoonX Countdown"			1:26
30.	"Jump the Rocket"			3:04
31.	"Zero Gravity"			2:54
32.	"Gold Magnet"			4:10
33.	"Power Move"			2:36
34.	"Medium Friendly"			1:33
35.	"Never Give Up"			1:15
36.	"The Final Fanfare"			2:14
37.	"Secret Agents"			1:35
38.	"GOODLIFE (Super Extended Mix)" (performed by Rag'n'Bone Man ft. WizTheMc)	Pemberton; Gary GoSanele; WizTheMc	Pemberton	8:47
39.	"Taking Everything (Film Mix)" (performed by Busta Rhymes)	Smith; Pemberton	Pemberton	3:41
40.	"The Big Bad Wolf 2 (Bonus)"			0:58

== Marketing ==
The first trailer for the film, set to "Bad Guy" by Billie Eilish, was released on November 21, 2024, and was later attached to the theatrical release of Wicked (2024).

A short film titled The Bad Guys: Little Lies and Alibis, premiered before the theatrical showings of Dog Man in January 2025, and was subsequently featured on the digital release of the film in August 2025, and the film's 4K, Blu-ray, and DVD releases in October 2025.

Main cast members Rockwell, Maron, Awkwafina, Robinson, Ramos, Borstein, Brooks, Lyonne, and Bakalova appeared on a panel promoting the film at the 2025 San Diego Comic-Con on July 26, leading up to its theatrical release.

Awkwafina appeared as a guest on Maron's long-running podcast WTF, in one of its final episodes, on July 31, in promotion of the film, on the eve of its American theatrical release.

== Release ==
The Bad Guys 2 was released theatrically in the United Kingdom on July 25, 2025, later in the United States on August 1, and in Australia on September 18.

=== Home media ===
The Bad Guys 2 was released on digital download on August 19, 2025, and on DVD, Blu-ray and Ultra HD Blu-ray on October 7, 2025.

== Reception ==
=== Box office ===
The Bad Guys 2 has grossed $82.8 million in the United States and Canada, and $157.2 million in other territories, for a worldwide total of $240 million.

In the United States and Canada, The Bad Guys 2 was released alongside The Naked Gun and was projected to make $20 million during its opening weekend. After making $9.2 million on its first day, including $2.25 million from Thursday previews, the film surpassed expectations and debuted with $22.2 million domestically, and $44.5 million globally, ranking it in second place behind holdover The Fantastic Four: First Steps. In its second weekend, the film made $10.4 million (a drop of 53%), falling to fourth place. The Bad Guys 2 then made $7.5 million in its third weekend, finishing in fifth place.

=== Critical response ===
On the review aggregator website Rotten Tomatoes, 88% of 114 critics' reviews are positive, with an average rating of 6.8/10. The website's consensus reads: "The Bad Guys 2's crew of reformed rapscallions are still a ton of fun as their latest adventure raises the stakes while maintaining a playful sense of mischief." Metacritic, which uses a weighted average, assigned the film a score of 64 out of 100, based on 23 critics, indicating "generally favorable" reviews. Audiences polled by CinemaScore gave the film an average grade of "A" on an A+ to F scale, the same as the first film.

=== Accolades ===
Award	Date of ceremony	Category	Recipient(s)	Result	Ref.
Hollywood Music in Media Awards	November 19, 2025	Best Original Score in an Animated Film	Daniel Pemberton	Nominated	
Kansas City Film Critics Circle	December 21, 2025	Best Animated Feature	The Bad Guys 2	Nominated	
Houston Film Critics Society Awards	January 20, 2026	Best Animated Feature	The Bad Guys 2	Nominated	
Black Reel Awards	February 16, 2026	Outstanding Voice Performance	Danielle Brooks	Nominated	
Black Reel Awards	February 16, 2026	Outstanding Voice Performance	Anthony Ramos	Nominated	
Annie Awards	February 21, 2026	Best Feature	The Bad Guys 2	Nominated	
Annie Awards	February 21, 2026	Best FX – Feature	Landon Gray, Michael Losure, Zachary Glynn, Chris Wombold, and Olivier Malric	Nominated	
Annie Awards	February 21, 2026	Best Character Animation – Feature	Ludovic Bouancheau	Nominated	
Annie Awards	February 21, 2026	Best Production Design – Feature	Luc Desmarchelier and Floriane Marchix	Nominated	
Annie Awards	February 21, 2026	Storyboarding – Feature	Anthony Holden and Young Ki Yoon	Won	
Visual Effects Society Awards	February 25, 2026	Outstanding Animation in an Animated Feature	Pierre Perifel, Damon Ross, Matt Baer, Benjamin Willis	Nominated	
Visual Effects Society Awards	February 25, 2026	Outstanding Environment in an Animated Feature	John J. Lee, Greg Hettinger, Mikael Genachte-Le Bail, Mayumi Shimokawa (for "Cairo City")	Nominated	
Visual Effects Society Awards	February 25, 2026	Outstanding Effects Simulations in an Animated Feature	Michael Losure, Landon Gray, Zachary Glynn, Steve Avoujageli	Nominated	
Artios Awards	February 26, 2026	Feature Animation	Christi Soper Hilt; Lara Boushehri	Nominated	
American Cinema Editors Awards	February 27, 2026	Best Edited Animated Feature Film (Theatrical or Non-Theatrical)	Jesse Averna	Nominated	
NAACP Image Awards	February 28, 2026	Outstanding Animated Motion Picture	The Bad Guys 2	Nominated	
NAACP Image Awards	February 28, 2026	Outstanding Character Voice-Over Performance – Motion Picture	Craig Robinson	Nominated	
NAACP Image Awards	February 28, 2026	Outstanding Character Voice-Over Performance – Motion Picture	Danielle Brooks	Nominated	
Art Directors Guild Awards	February 28, 2026	Best Animated Feature Film	Luc Desmarchelier	Nominated	
Producers Guild of America Awards	February 28, 2026	Best Animated Motion Picture	Damon Ross	Nominated	
Motion Picture Sound Editors	March 8, 2026	Outstanding Achievement in Sound Editing – Feature Animation	DreamWorks Animation	Nominated	
Saturn Awards	March 8, 2026	Best Animated Film	The Bad Guys 2	Nominated	
World Soundtrack Awards	October 10, 2026	Film Composer of the Year	Daniel Pemberton (Note: Also for Project Hail Mary (2025), The Drama (2026), and Masters of the Universe (2026))	Won	

== Harassment lawsuit ==
Parker Goldsmith, a trans man who uses singular they pronouns, filed a lawsuit against DreamWorks Animation and NBCUniversal in March 2026. They served as a first assistant editor on The Bad Guys 2, and were allegedly subjected to gender-based workplace harassment while working on the film. Their direct supervisor, John Venzon (the editor of the first film), is named as defendant; he allegedly asked Goldsmith invasive questions regarding their personal life and medical transition, deadnamed them, sent them transphobic Internet memes, and outed them to co-workers. Goldsmith had reported the harassment to human resources and told Venzon in a private meeting that they would work remotely, which Venzon was "appalled" by. Goldsmith was later told by the human resources manager that other employees corroborated their version of the events. Venzon was fired in March 2024.

== Future ==
In June 2025, two months before the theatrical release of The Bad Guys 2 in the United States, directors Perifel and Sans revealed in an interview with Collider that they were planning a third film. Sans and producer Damon Ross, however, later left DreamWorks Animation for Sony Pictures Animation, leaving the status of the project currently uncertain as of 2026.
