= The Bad Guys (film) =

2022 American film by Pierre Perifel

- Theatrical release poster
- Directed by: Pierre Perifel
- Screenplay by: Etan Cohen
- Based on: The Bad Guys by Aaron Blabey
- Produced by: Damon Ross; Rebecca Huntley
- Starring: Sam Rockwell; Marc Maron; Awkwafina; Craig Robinson; Anthony Ramos; Richard Ayoade; Zazie Beetz; Alex Borstein; Lilly Singh
- Edited by: John Venzon
- Music by: Daniel Pemberton
- Production company: DreamWorks Animation
- Distributed by: Universal Pictures
- Release dates: March 16, 2022 (Egypt and Seychelles); April 22, 2022 (United States)
- Running time: 100 minutes
- Country: United States
- Language: English
- Budget: $69–80 million
- Box office: $250.8 million

The Bad Guys is a 2022 American animated neo-noir crime comedy film produced by DreamWorks Animation. Loosely based on the children's book series by Aaron Blabey, the film was directed by Pierre Perifel (in his feature directorial debut) and written by Etan Cohen, while featuring the voices of Sam Rockwell, Marc Maron, Awkwafina, Craig Robinson, Anthony Ramos, Richard Ayoade, Zazie Beetz, Alex Borstein, and Lilly Singh. It tells the story of a criminal group of anthropomorphic animals who, upon being caught, pretend to attempt to reform themselves as model citizens, only for their leader to find himself genuinely drawn to changing his ways for good.

Work on the film started in March 2018, with Cohen writing the screenplay. The characters and themes drew inspiration from various crime films and anime series such as Pulp Fiction (1994), the Ocean's film trilogy, Lupin the Third, and Sherlock Hound, while the inspiration for the film's animation style came from Spider-Man: Into the Spider-Verse (2018). Production began at DreamWorks Animation's Glendale campus, and some additional production assets were borrowed from Jellyfish Pictures, with voice acting being performed remotely due to the COVID-19 pandemic.

The Bad Guys was released in the United States on April 22, 2022, by Universal Pictures. It received positive reviews from critics and grossed $251 million. A sequel, The Bad Guys 2, was released in 2025. It has also spawned a media franchise; with a series of Netflix-exclusive prequels being released between the main films.

== Plot ==
In Los Angeles, where humans and anthropomorphic animals co-exist, master pickpocketer Mr. Wolf leads the Bad Guys, an infamous gang of criminals consisting of his best friend and safecracker Mr. Snake, expert hacker Ms. "Webs" Tarantula, master of disguise Mr. Shark, and loose cannon Mr. Piranha.

One day after another brazen robbery and police chase, Governor Diane Foxington publicly insults the gang's predictability on TV. Wolf convinces them to steal the Golden Dolphin award, which will be presented to guinea pig philanthropist Professor Rupert Marmalade IV, who has helped rebuild the city following a meteorite impact. Infiltrating the Golden Dolphin ceremony, Wolf feels a sense of accomplishment after inadvertently assisting an elderly woman, but his conflicted feelings delay the gang's escape, ultimately leading to their arrest. To avoid prison and reclaim the award, Wolf persuades Diane to let Marmalade reform the Bad Guys' criminal ways.

Marmalade's efforts to reform the gang are unsuccessful, culminating in a disastrous attempt to rescue guinea pigs from a research lab. Diane scolds them and nearly calls off the experiment, but sympathizes with Wolf, who acts the way society expects of him. Wolf finds himself rescuing a cat from a tree, captured by Marmalade in a video that turns the gang's public image around, but Snake suspects that Wolf is losing sight of their plan.

At Marmalade's charity gala, the gang executes another heist to steal the Golden Dolphin. Wolf, having fallen for Diane, is unable to do it and reforms. However, the meteorite is stolen instead, and the gang is blamed and arrested, while a remorseful Wolf gives Diane the location of the gang's lair full of stolen loot. Marmalade reveals to the gang that he stole the meteorite and arranged everything to frame them, including posing as the old lady back at the ceremony. Very enraged, Wolf attempts to attack Marmalade, only for Marmalade to open the van doors in front of everyone, making it look like he was attacked without provocation.

In prison, Wolf explains that he believes a better life is possible, leading to a fight with Snake, who is convinced that society will never accept them. The gang is rescued by Diane, whom Wolf realizes is the Crimson Paw, a former criminal mastermind. Wolf agrees to help Diane stop Marmalade from using the meteorite as a hypnotic power source, but the others return to their hideout only to discover their loot is gone. Snake comforts Shark by giving him their last Push Pop, leading to them all realizing that Wolf was right about a better life, but Snake storms off in apperent denial to ally with Marmalade.

Marmalade uses the meteorite to control an army of guinea pigs, which he sends to rob his charity funds throughout the city. Diane reveals to Wolf that, when trying to steal the Golden Dolphin, she realized she was being the "tricky fox" society perceived her to be and abandoned her criminal ways. Attempting to steal back the meteorite, Marmalade and Snake capture Wolf and Diane. Webs, Shark, and Piranha, having also been redeemed, arrive to rescue them. They race to deliver the meteorite to the police but decide to bring Snake back first. Chased by the guinea pig swarm, Wolf is forced to surrender the meteorite when Marmalade kicks Snake out of his helicopter; Wolf and Snake reconcile after rescuing Snake.

The police confront the gang, while Marmalade's mind control device is destroyed. Before Diane can defend the gang by revealing that she was the Crimson Paw, Wolf, and the others willingly turn themselves in. Marmalade tries to claim credit for recovering the meteorite, but Snake reveals that he faked his defection and had the meteorite swapped with Marmalade's replica lamp when he had the mind control device. The machine destroys the meteorite (Snake had set it up to overload with the real meteorite once the lamp was taken), exposing Marmalade as the real thief, while he inadvertently frames himself as the Crimson Paw after a diamond he took from Diane falls out of his pocket, leading to his arrest. As the police take the Bad Guys to jail, Wolf reveals that he left the Push Pop to prove there was good in Snake.

== Voice cast ==
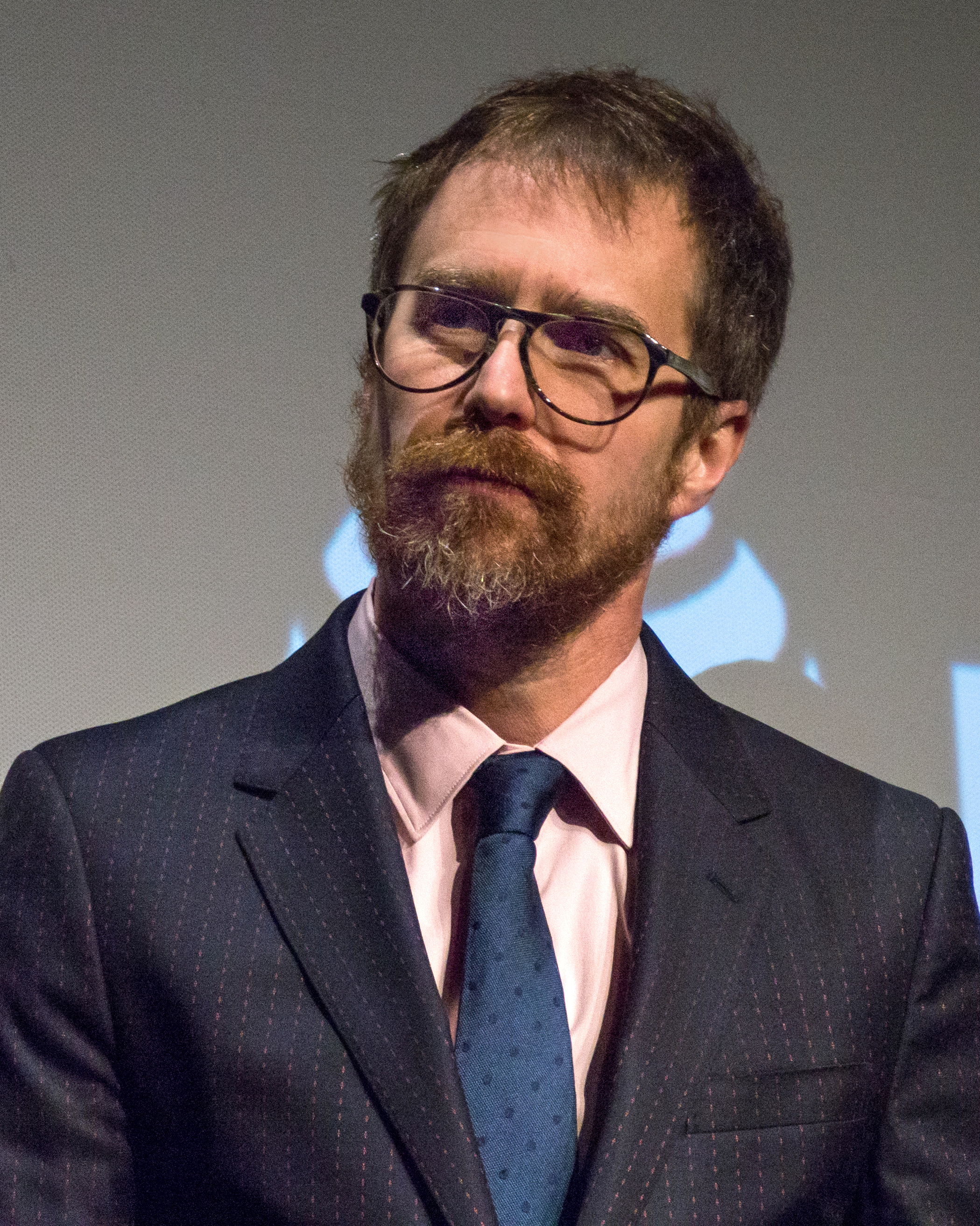
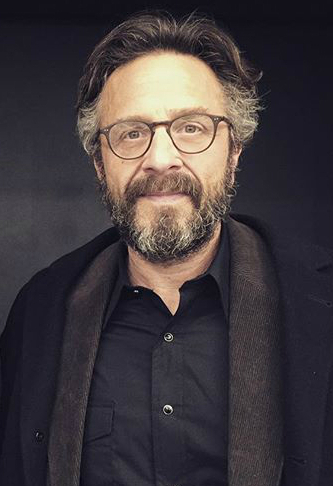
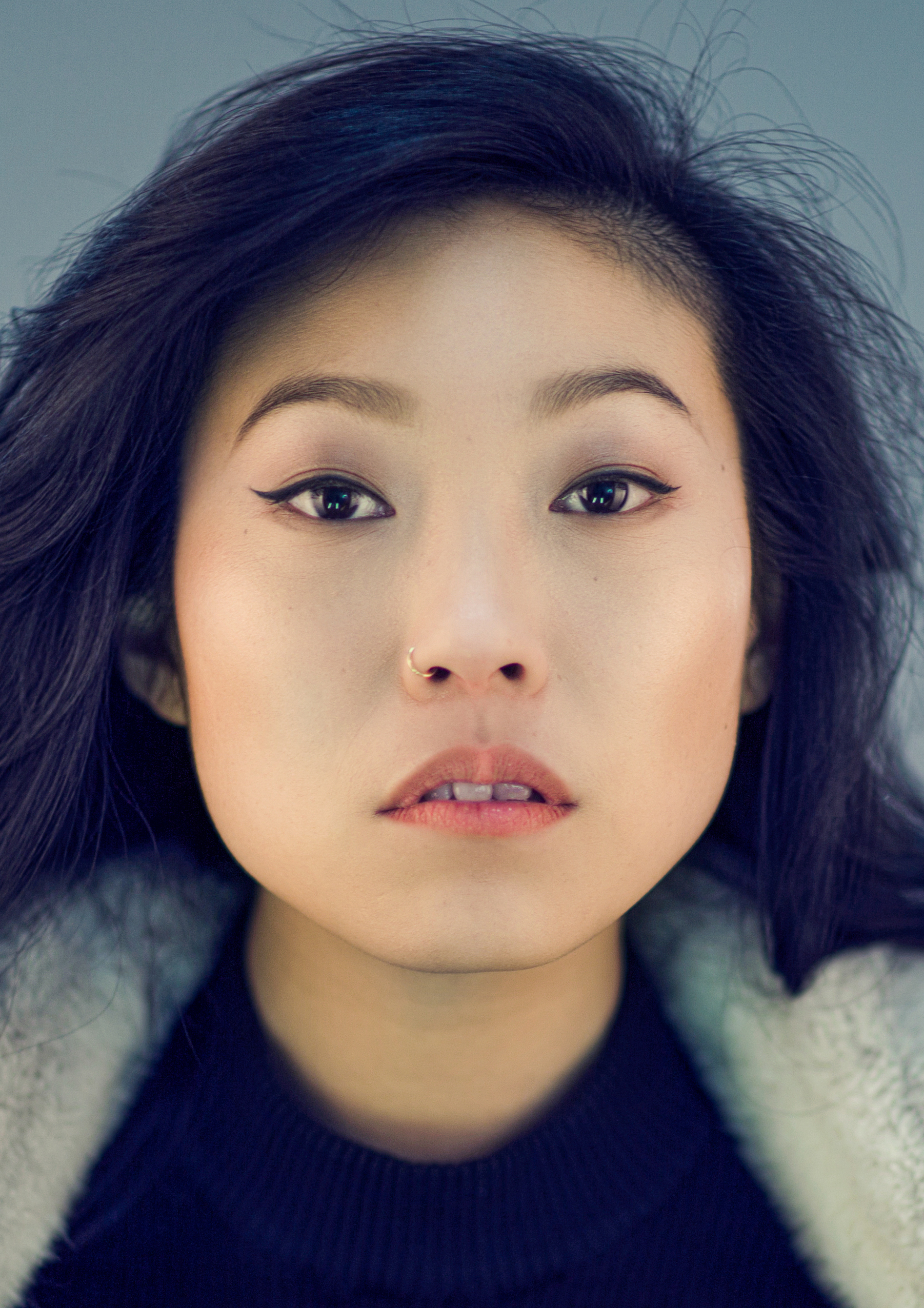
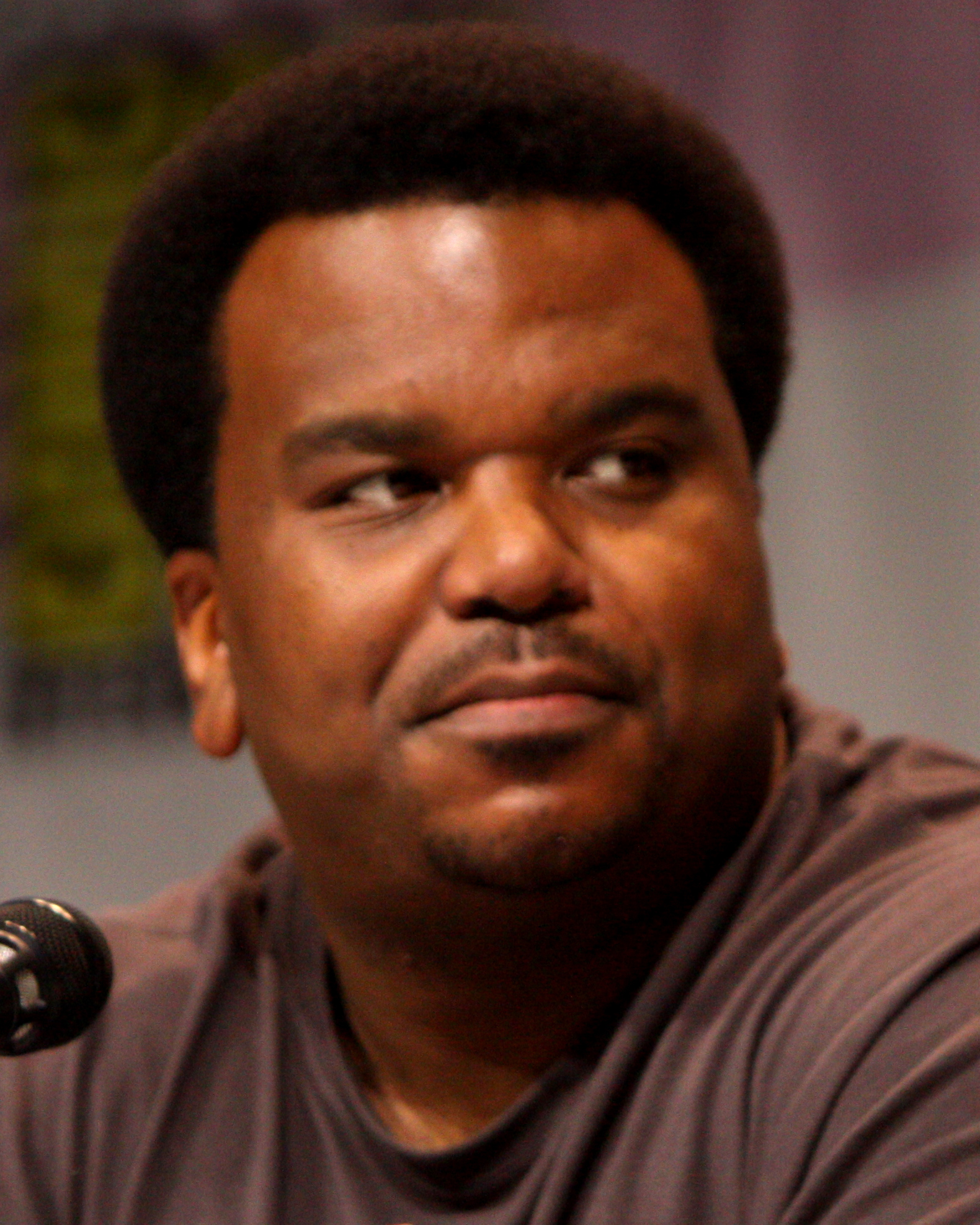
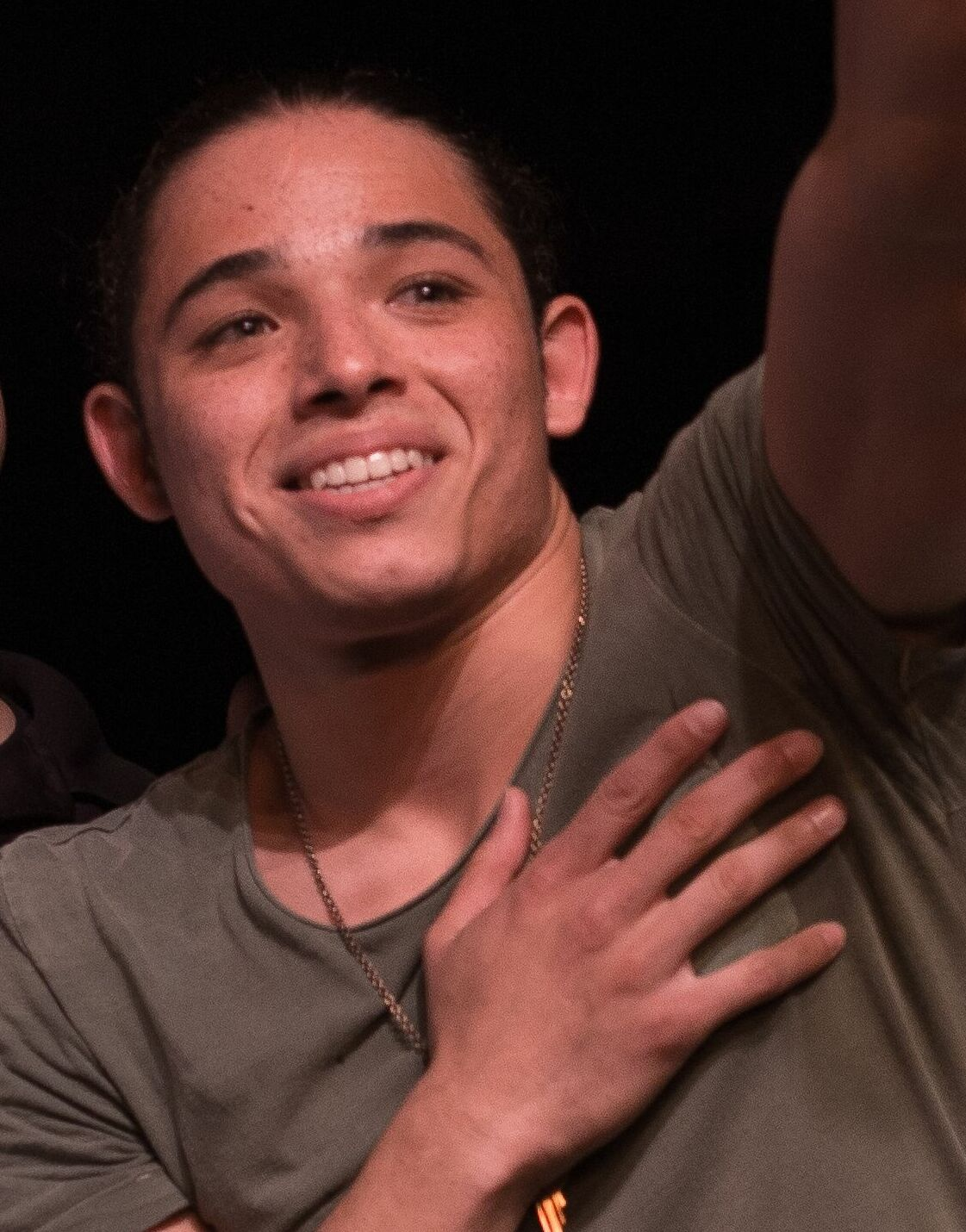
The titular group of criminal animals are voiced by Sam Rockwell (Mr. Wolf), Marc Maron (Mr. Snake), Awkwafina (Ms. Tarantula), Craig Robinson (Mr. Shark) and Anthony Ramos (Mr. Piranha) respectively.
- Sam Rockwell as Mr. Wolf, a witty, charming, pickpocket wolf and the leader of "The Bad Guys" gang, who also acts as the gang's getaway driver
- Marc Maron as Mr. Snake, a grouchy, cynical safe-cracking snake and Wolf's second-in-command, as well as his best friend
- Awkwafina as Ms. Tarantula, a sharp-tongued, sarcastic tarantula and expert hacker, also known as "Webs"
- Craig Robinson as Mr. Shark, a childish, sensitive great white shark and master of disguise
- Anthony Ramos as Mr. Piranha, a short-fused, loose-cannon piranha and the "muscle" of the gang and has flatulence when he lies
- Richard Ayoade as Professor Rupert Marmalade IV, a wealthy, British-accented, guinea pig philanthropist and scientist who mentors Wolf's group with doing "good deeds", but is secretly an evil and greedy individual, intending to steal from his own charity
- Zazie Beetz as Diane Foxington (a.k.a. The Crimson Paw), a red fox serving as the state governor and former master thief-turned-good, and Wolf's love interest
- Alex Borstein as Misty Luggins, the hot-tempered human chief of police who is determined to arrest the Bad Guys at any cost
- Lilly Singh as Tiffany Fluffit, a local human news reporter with the tendency to exaggerate her reports

== Production ==
=== Development ===
On July 22, 2017, Australia's The Daily Telegraph reported that several studios had expressed interest in adapting Aaron Blabey's book series The Bad Guys into a feature film. In March 2018, DreamWorks Animation announced the development of a film based on the book series, with Etan Cohen writing the screenplay. The following year, in October, it was reported that the film would be directed by Pierre Perifel in his feature directorial debut, with Cohen and Hilary Winston set to co-write the film's script. Throughout the development of the film, the crew worked remotely during the COVID-19 pandemic. The film was described as having "a similar twist on the heist genre that Shrek did on fairy tales, and what Kung Fu Panda did for the kung fu genre". Winston was only credited for additional screenplay material with Ice Age: Dawn of the Dinosaurs writer Yoni Brenner while the film was executive produced by Cohen, Blabey, and Foundation Media's Patrick Hughes. The cast was announced on July 28, 2021. It also marked the first DreamWorks Animation film to have Lenovo as their preferred workstation partner, following the end of their association with HP.

=== Animation, design, and influences ===
The film's design was inspired by Sony Pictures Animation's Spider-Man: Into the Spider-Verse, with DreamWorks adopting a more illustrative and stylized aesthetic than their previous films. Character designs took inspiration from a mix of styles from directors such as Luc Besson's The Fifth Element, Michael Mann's Heat, Steven Soderbergh's Ocean's Eleven, and Quentin Tarantino's Reservoir Dogs, and Pulp Fiction. Pierre Perifel cited Akira Toriyama and Dragon Ball as influences for the art style. The film was also inspired by anime and manga series such as Sherlock Hound and Lupin III as well as the French-Belgian animated film Ernest & Celestine, due to how it influenced the approach to the characters.

While most of the animation for the film was provided by DWA Glendale, Jellyfish Pictures, who previously worked with DreamWorks on providing the animation for How to Train Your Dragon: Homecoming and Spirit Untamed, as well as providing additional production assets for The Boss Baby: Family Business, handled the additional asset production services using proprietary software like Premo and Moonray, along with a new tool called Doodle – created for the 2D effects and for allowing the animators to move the lines around the character rigs. The film's opening diner scene, inspired by the similar opening scene from Tarantino's Pulp Fiction, is the longest one-shot in DreamWorks Animation history, lasting two minutes, 25 seconds, and seven frames.

== Music ==
The Bad Guys (Original Motion Picture Soundtrack)

Film score by Daniel Pemberton
- Released: March 31, 2022
- Recorded: 2021–2022
- Genre: Score
- Length: 67:32
- Label: Back Lot Music

Daniel Pemberton chronology
Being the Ricardos (2021)	The Bad Guys (Original Motion Picture Soundtrack) (2022)	Amsterdam (2022)

Singles from The Bad Guys (Original Motion Picture Soundtrack)
- 1. "Good Tonight" Released: March 18, 2022; 2. "Feelin' Alright" Released: March 25, 2022; 3. "Good Tonight (Party Pupils Remix)" Released: April 22, 2022

On June 22, 2021, Daniel Pemberton was signed to compose the score for the film, having previously composed the soundtrack for Spider-Man: Into the Spider-Verse. A song "Good Tonight" written by Pemberton and Gary Go was made and released on March 18 by Back Lot Music, performed by Anthony Ramos, who does the additional lyrics with Will Wells. The album was released on March 31 with two other new songs included with "Good Tonight", includes a cover of "Feelin' Alright" by Elle King (released on March 25) and "Brand New Day" by The Heavy. Director Pierre Perifel, producer Damon Ross and composer Daniel Pemberton recorded backup vocals on "Brand New Day". Following the American release of the film on April 22, a new remix of "Good Tonight" was released by Party Pupils.

Additionally, "Stop Drop Roll" by Can't Stop Won't Stop, "Howlin' for You" by The Black Keys, "Fly Me to the Moon" by Julie London and "Go" by The Chemical Brothers are heard in the film but not included in the soundtrack album. Furthermore, "Bad Guy" by Billie Eilish was only featured in the trailers, and similarly those of its successor.

All music is composed by Daniel Pemberton, except as noted.

No.	Title	Writer(s)	Artist	Length
1.	"The Big Bad Wolf"			1:05
2.	"Meet The Bad Guys"			3:39
3.	"Let's Bounce"			3:08
4.	"Push Pop"			3:28
5.	"Step 3"			3:17
6.	"Security Surprise"			1:36
7.	"The Dolphin Heist"			4:38
8.	"Going to Go Good"			4:07
9.	"Turn on the Charm"			1:23
10.	"Marmalade Prelude"			1:32
11.	"A Heist for Good"			2:28
12.	"The Sharing Laboratory"			1:51
13.	"Save the Cat"			1:43
14.	"Good Tonight"	Pemberton, Gary Go, Anthony Ramos and Will Wells		3:41
15.	"So Long Suckers"			1:56
16.	"The Lair of Loot"			2:29
17.	"Loot Loops"			1:08
18.	"Bedtime Story"			2:06
19.	"Double Crossed"			4:09
20.	"Tricky Fox"			1:08
21.	"The Crimson Paw"			1:51
22.	"Secret Hideout"			2:19
23.	"Evil Masterplan"			1:13
24.	"The Sad Guys"			1:35
25.	"One Last Push Pop"			1:40
26.	"Finish Them"			1:45
27.	"Huff + Puff"			2:07
28.	"Just Robbing This Place"			1:55
29.	"Freeway Escape"			2:27
30.	"Who Said It Was the End?"			2:03
31.	"Redemption"			2:01
32.	"The Old Switcheroo"			1:45
33.	"Feelin' Alright"	Dave Mason	Elle King	4:04
34.	"Brand New Day"	Pemberton, Daniel Taylor and Kelvin Swaby	The Heavy	3:45

== Marketing ==
The film's marketing campaign began on December 14, 2021, with the release of the first trailer, a first-look photo, and a cast table read. The first trailer was also shown during theater screenings of Sing 2. A second trailer, released on February 23, 2022. A television spot aired during the Super Bowl pre-game garnered 8.5 million views when it was released on YouTube. Overall, fourteen promotional YouTube videos attracted 110.1 million views. The Bad Guys also had a tie-in with the 2022 March Madness tournament, featuring a virtual bracket for the film's characters and commercials during pre- and post-game coverage on TNT and TBS. A Snapchat AR lens of Mr. Wolf and a TikTok trend set to Billie Eilish's "Bad Guy" were used to promote the film. Deadline Hollywood said Universal took advantage of April Fool's Day (April 1), the day tickets went on sale, with the release of another Snapchat AR lens that went viral after it was used by popular influencers such as MrBeast and Michael Le, gaining 21.5 million views and over 1.8 million likes on TikTok.

== Release ==
=== Theatrical ===
On October 7, 2019, it was reported that the film would be theatrically released on September 17, 2021, taking over the release date of Spooky Jack. In December 2020, the film was delayed with The Boss Baby: Family Business taking its original slot, though it was confirmed that it would get a new date "within the coming weeks" due to the COVID-19 pandemic. In March 2021, the release date was rescheduled to April 15, 2022. In October 2021, it was pushed back again by one week to April 22. The Bad Guys had a red carpet screening at the Ace Hotel Los Angeles on April 12, 2022, with Beetz in attendance. On March 1, 2022, Universal pulled the release in Russia in response to the Russian invasion of Ukraine.

=== Home media and streaming ===
Universal Pictures Home Entertainment released The Bad Guys on DVD, Blu-ray and Ultra HD Blu-ray and for digital download in the United States on June 21, 2022. The film was released on NBCUniversal's Peacock streaming service on July 1, 2022. As part of an 18-month deal with Netflix for Universal's animated films, the film streamed on Peacock for the first four months of the pay-TV window, before moving to Netflix on November 1, 2022, for the next ten, returning to Peacock on September 1, 2023, for the next four, and finally moving to Amazon Prime Video on January 1, 2024.

A 3D Blu-ray release of the film was released in Australia on May 10, 2023. A European 3D Blu-ray version was released on May 23, 2024.

== Reception ==
=== Box office ===
The Bad Guys grossed $97.5 million in the United States and Canada, and $153.4 million in other territories, for a worldwide total of $250.8 million.

In the United States and Canada, The Bad Guys was released alongside The Northman and The Unbearable Weight of Massive Talent, and was projected to gross $13–20 million from 4,008 theaters in its opening weekend. The film made $8 million on its first day, including $1.15 million from Thursday night previews. It went on to debut with $24 million, topping the box office. Deadline Hollywood noted that the over-performance was thanks to a diverse turnout, big marketing push, and recent success of family films. Women made up 56% of the audience during its opening. The ethnic breakdown of the audience showed that 40% Caucasian, 25% Latino and Hispanic, 20% African American, and 9% Asian or other. The film grossed $16.2 million in its second weekend, finishing first again. It made $9.6 million in its third weekend and $7 million in its fourth, both times finishing second behind newcomer Doctor Strange in the Multiverse of Madness. It stayed in the box office top ten until its eleventh weekend.

Outside the U.S. and Canada, the film earned $8.5 million from 25 international markets in its opening weekend. This included a strong $1.7 million opening in Spain, where it finished ahead of The Batman and tied with Encanto as the best debut in the country during the COVID-19 pandemic. In its second weekend, it made $6.5 million from 37 markets. Its third weekend added $10.5 million, which included a $3.1 million debut in the UK and $1.7 million from Australia, where the film had the best opening for an animated film since the start of the pandemic. It made $7.5 million in its fourth weekend, which included a debut in France of $1.5 million. The film crossed the $50 million mark outside the U.S. and Canada in its fifth weekend, ahead of its North American release, after adding $6.5 million. In its sixth weekend, the film made $5.9 million, which Deadline Hollywood noted as a "terrific 9% drop" before its release in China on April 29. The film added $9 million in its seventh weekend. This included an opening of $4.53 million in China, where it received a "strong" 9.1/10 rating from audiences on the Maoyan website. The film earned $7.2 million the following weekend, which included a debut of $1.93 million in Korea. The Bad Guys also surpassed the gross of Encanto in China. It made $6.7 million in its ninth weekend, crossed the $100 million overseas mark in its tenth weekend, and added another $5.8 million in its eleventh weekend. It made $8.9 million the following weekend, surpassing the earnings of Moana and Toy Story 4 in China. In its thirteenth weekend, it made $3.5 million.

=== Critical response ===
On the review aggregator website Rotten Tomatoes, 87% of 174 critics' reviews are positive, with an average rating of 6.9/10. The website's consensus reads: "Fast-paced, funny, and full of colorful visual appeal, The Bad Guys is good news for audiences seeking options the whole family can enjoy." Metacritic, which uses a weighted average, assigned the film a score of 64 out of 100, based on 26 critics, indicating "generally favorable" reviews. Audiences polled by CinemaScore gave the film an average grade of "A" on an A+ to F scale, while those at PostTrak gave it an average score of 4 out of 5 stars.

The Washington Post's Kristen Page-Kirby gave 3 stars out of 4, and concluded: "The moral of the story doesn't pack a huge wallop. Not that it needs to. (We can't all be Encanto.) Still, it's clever, visually interesting, and very, very funny. Even when the humor goes lowbrow, it makes narrative sense. A joke about flatulence is a lot funnier when it's essential to the plot. The Bad Guys gets that. In fact, The Bad Guys gets a lot of things. It knows precisely what it is — and what it sets out to do, it does well. It's a heist film with heart and humor, and where's the crime in that?" IGN's Ryan Leston gave a rating of 8 out of 10 and wrote: The Bad Guys is a slick, hilarious heist movie with buckets of laughs and a lot of heart. It's Ocean's Eleven meets 'Little Red Riding Hood' with Sam Rockwell's Wolf going on a charm offensive to stay out of jail... and he might just win you over in the process. Richard Ayoade has a blast as the sanctimonious Professor Marmalade, and the entire voice cast brings their A-game with some stellar gags that will get you roaring with laughter. The Bad Guys is a fun, family-friendly caper that's bursting with action and brimming with laughs." Chicago Sun-Times's Richard Roeper gave the film 3.5 stars out of 4, and commented that "The animation combines computer-generated 2D and 3D with a look that will remind you of a Saturday-morning cartoon—only much crisper and more dazzling. There's nothing photorealistic about the animation; it's stylized and has very specific definition of Heist Movie Los Angeles, with the sky so bright it's almost overexposed, and yet somehow creating a bit of a noir vibe. This is a great-looking film with terrific performances, some lovely messaging, and a steady parade of solid laughs—some the kids will enjoy and just as many targeted squarely at the grown-up kids in the audience."

The Guardian's Wendy Ide gave 3 stars out of 5 and said: "Like Roger Rabbit, the pacing owes a debt to the demented frenzy of classic Looney Tunes animations, but the film also nods to heist movies, notably the Ocean's series. It's deliberately preposterous – the disguises are rarely more convincing than the kind of false nose and moustache combo you might find in a cracker. But there's a kernel of believability where it matters: in the easy repartee and fully fleshed friendships. It's sharp, silly, and frequently very funny."

=== Accolades ===
Award	Date of ceremony	Category	Recipient(s)	Result	Ref.
Heartland Film Festival	March 18, 2022	Truly Moving Picture Award	The Bad Guys	Won	
Hollywood Music in Media Awards	November 16, 2022	Best Original Score in an Animated Film	Daniel Pemberton	Nominated	
Black Reel Awards	February 6, 2023	Outstanding Voice Performance	Zazie Beetz as Diane Foxington	Nominated	
Visual Effects Society Awards	February 15, 2023	Outstanding Visual Effects in an Animated Feature	Pierre Perifel, Damon Ross, Matt Baer and JP Sans for The Bad Guys	Nominated	
Hollywood Critics Association	February 24, 2023	Best Animated Film	The Bad Guys	Nominated	
Annie Awards	February 25, 2023	Outstanding Achievement for Character Animation in an Animated Feature Production	Jorge Capote	Nominated	
Annie Awards	February 25, 2023	Outstanding Achievement for Character Animation in an Animated Feature Production	Min Hong	Nominated	
Annie Awards	February 25, 2023	Outstanding Achievement for Character Design in an Animated Feature Production	Taylor Krahenbuhl	Won	
Annie Awards	February 25, 2023	Outstanding Achievement for Music in an Animated Feature Production	Daniel Pemberton	Nominated	
Annie Awards	February 25, 2023	Outstanding Achievement for Production Design in an Animated Feature Production	Luc Desmarchelier, Floriane Marchix	Nominated	
Satellite Awards	March 3, 2023	Best Motion Picture - Animated or Mixed Media	The Bad Guys	Nominated	
Kids' Choice Awards	March 4, 2023	Favorite Animated Movie	The Bad Guys	Nominated	
Kids' Choice Awards	March 4, 2023	Favorite Female Voice From an Animated Movie	Awkwafina as Tarantula	Nominated	
American Cinema Editors Awards	March 5, 2023	Best Edited Animated Feature Film	John Venzon for The Bad Guys	Nominated	
Artios Awards	March 9, 2023	Animation	Christi Soper Hilt	Nominated	

The film was awarded the title of Truly Moving Picture Award at the 2022 Heartland Film Festival and was nominated for Best Animated Film at the Hollywood Critics Association and Satellite Awards. Beetz received a nomination for Outstanding Voice Performance at the 2023 Black Reel Awards. The film also was nominated for Outstanding Visual Effects in an Animated Feature at the 21st Visual Effects Society Awards, a Kids' Choice Award for Favorite Animated Movie as well as Awkwafina receiving a nomination for Favorite Female Voice From an Animated Movie at the 2023 Kids' Choice Awards, and for five Annie Awards (winning one).

The film was nominated for Best Edited Animated Feature Film and for Outstanding Achievement in Casting at the 38th Artios Awards.

== Future ==
=== Sequel ===
In March 2022, a month before the film was released in the US, Perifel said that he would love to do a sequel. Two years later, DreamWorks Animation officially confirmed a sequel and was released in the US on August 1, 2025. Perifel returned to direct, and JP Sans, who served as head of character animation on the previous film, co-directed, with the cast reprising their roles. On July 13, 2024, it was announced that Natasha Lyonne was cast in the sequel. A trailer was released on November 21, 2024, with the cast returning, along with new voice actors.

=== Television specials ===
A holiday special inspired by the characters from the film was produced by DreamWorks Animation Television. It was directed by Bret Haaland from Fast & Furious Spy Racers, and executive produced by Haaland and Katherine Nolfi from Abominable and the Invisible City and Spirit Riding Free. The holiday special, titled The Bad Guys: A Very Bad Holiday, debuted on November 30, 2023, on Netflix. None of the film cast reprised their roles. The special takes place before the events of the film and features the titular Bad Guys reluctantly restoring holiday cheer to Los Angeles after Christmas was unexpectedly canceled. Another prequel and a Halloween special The Bad Guys: Haunted Heist was released on October 3, 2024, with the main cast from A Very Bad Holiday reprising their roles.

=== Television series ===
On October 8, 2025, a prequel series, titled The Bad Guys: The Series, was announced and premiered on Netflix on November 6 with the main cast from the holiday prequels reprising their roles. Inspired by the characters from the film, the series was produced by DreamWorks Animation Television.

=== Other media ===
Mr. Wolf (voiced by Michael Godere replacing Rockwell) and Diane Foxington (voiced by Bryce Charles replacing Beetz) are playable characters in the 2023 crossover kart racing video game DreamWorks All-Star Kart Racing. Godere had previously performed miscellaneous voice work in the film and later reprised his role as Mr. Wolf in the subsequent Netflix prequels.
