= Etan Cohen =

American screenwriter and filmmaker

- איתן כהן
- Born: Safed, Israel
- Education: Harvard College
- Occupation: filmmaker
- Years active: 1995–present

Etan Cohen (Hebrew: איתן כהן) is an Israeli-American filmmaker who has written scripts for Hollywood movies, including Idiocracy (2006), Tropic Thunder (2008), Madagascar: Escape 2 Africa (2008), Men in Black 3 (2012), The Bad Guys (2022) and its sequel (2025).

== Early life and education ==
Born in Safed, Israel, to a Jewish family, Cohen grew up in Sharon, Massachusetts, US. He graduated from the Maimonides School and Harvard College, where he wrote for the Harvard Lampoon.

== Career ==
His first produced scripts, in 1995 and 1997, were for Beavis and Butthead, where he was credited as Etan Cohen. He has since written for other Mike Judge-directed projects, including King of the Hill from 2001 to 2005, and for the feature film Idiocracy in 2006. In the late 1990s he worked on two other television series – the animated Recess and the shortlived It's Like, You Know.... In 2007, he wrote the short film My Wife is Retarded. After scripting Idiocracy, he worked on the animated series, American Dad! and wrote the episode, "Failure Is Not a Factory-Installed Option". The American Dad! minor character of the same name is named for him.

In 2008, Cohen co-wrote, along with Ben Stiller and Justin Theroux, the action-comedy film Tropic Thunder. He also co-wrote, along with Eric Darnell and Tom McGrath, Madagascar: Escape 2 Africa, which earned an Annie Award nomination for best Writing in a Feature Production.

Cohen penned the script for 2012's Men in Black 3. In 2015, he made his directorial debut with Get Hard, which he also co-wrote.

Cohen wrote and directed the 2018 film Holmes & Watson. The film was a critical and commercial flop and later earned him a Golden Raspberry Award for Worst Director.

== Personal life ==
Cohen is an observant Jew. He keeps kosher and does not work on the Jewish Sabbath. He and his wife send their children to a Jewish day school.

== Filmography ==
=== Films ===
Year	Title	Director	Writer	Notes
2006	Idiocracy	No	Yes	Co-wrote with Mike Judge
2008	Tropic Thunder	No	Yes	Co-wrote with Justin Theroux and Ben Stiller
2008	Madagascar: Escape 2 Africa	No	Yes	Co-wrote with Eric Darnell and Tom McGrath; Nominated – Annie Award for Best Writing in an Animated Feature Production
2012	Men in Black 3	No	Yes	
2015	Get Hard	Yes	Yes	Directorial debut Co-wrote with Jay Martel and Ian Roberts
2018	Holmes & Watson	Yes	Yes	Golden Raspberry Award for Worst Director
2022	The Bad Guys	No	Yes	Additional screenplay material by Yoni Brenner and Hilary Winston; Also executive producer with Aaron Blabey and Patrick Hughes
2022	Puss in Boots: The Last Wish	No	Partial	Additional screenplay material
2024	Brothers	No	Yes	
2025	The Bad Guys 2	No	Yes	Co-wrote with Yoni Brenner

=== Television ===
Year	Title	Notes
1995–1997	Beavis and Butt-head	
1999	It's Like, You Know	
1999	Recess	
1999	Timon & Pumbaa	
2001–2005	King of the Hill	Annie Award for Best Writing in an Animated Television Production
2006	American Dad!	

== Awards and nominations ==
Year	Award	Category	Nominated work	Result	Ref.
2005	Annie Award	Writing in an Animated Television Production	King of the Hill	Won	
2007	US Comedy Arts Festival	Comedy Festival Award for Best Short Film	My Wife Is Retarded	Won	
2009	Annie Award	Best Writing in an Animated Feature Production	Madagascar 2	Nominated	
2019	39th Golden Raspberry Awards	Worst Director	Holmes & Watson	Won	
