= The Counselor (soundtrack) =

The Counselor (Original Motion Picture Soundtrack)

Film score by Daniel Pemberton
- Released: October 22, 2013 (digital); November 11, 2013 (physical)
- Recorded: Abbey Road Studios, London
- Genre: Film score
- Length: 64:05
- Label: Milan
- Producer: Daniel Pemberton

Daniel Pemberton chronology
Complicit (2013)	The Counselor (2013)	Cuban Fury (2014)

The Counselor (Original Motion Picture Soundtrack) is the soundtrack to the 2013 film of the same name directed by Ridley Scott. The film is scored by Daniel Pemberton in his first high-profile project as a composer. The score recorded at the Abbey Road Studios consisted of an orchestral music integrated with guitar noises and textures recorded in Pemberton's home studio. The soundtrack was released by Milan Records in digital formats on October 22, 2013 and a physical release on November 11, 2013.

== Development ==
Scott listened to Pemberton's debut score for The Awakening (2011) which he liked it and roped Pemberton to write music for The Counselor. Pemberton felt that "Ridley responds really well to interesting and unusual sounds. So as a composer who likes making unusual sounds, that's exciting. It was daunting but he was great to work with and up for experimenting." Pemberton felt essential on how the spoken word was to the themes of the film, thereby being cautious with the score. While writing the first cue "The Hunter", Pemberton recalled that the theme should be "philosophical" and "visceral". Hence he tried to experiment the guitar to sound unique and emotionally ground the film, explaining that most of the score "underlies emotion" and the cue "pushes it more to the front".

The "Warning" was one of the main themes that served the idea, which is to "represent the warning, every time the Counselor (Michael Fassbender) is told to be careful". The track "A Glorious Woman" which was played the Counselor proposes to his to girlfriend Laura (Penélope Cruz) was not planned for the film score, but however he wrote the track as the "contrast and elegance was too great to resist". The piece was slightly similar to the track "Memories of Green" composed by Vangelis for Blade Runner (1982) which Pemberton described as "the memory before the memory".

The score consisted of sounds in a mix which consisted of scratching wires, which played a sustained melody that bent wives. The film furthermore consisted of a "ping" sound heard throughout, which Pemberton described as a load of guitar harmonics re-recorded through a guitar amplifier with a spring reverb and bent in a sampler, so that they are slightly in and out of tune with one another to give an uncomfortable feeling to the listeners. This became a separate cue written for the film.

== Track listing ==
The Counselor (Original Motion Picture Soundtrack)
No.	Title	Length
1.	"The Hunter"	1:47
2.	"The Counselor (Titles)"	4:10
3.	"The Lovers"	1:51
4.	"A Warning (Moral Decisions)"	2:10
5.	"Truth Has No Temperature"	4:14
6.	"Serious Problems"	2:07
7.	"Confrontation And Conspiracy"	2:57
8.	"Escape"	3:34
9.	"The Wireman Prepares"	5:08
10.	"The Lovers (Phone Call)"	1:37
11.	"A Glorious Woman"	3:13
12.	"A Rare Stone (Cautionary Tale)"	3:22
13.	"Malkina Listens"	3:07
14.	"Vanish In A Heartbeat"	2:36
15.	"All These Worlds"	4:06
16.	"Hotel Paranoia"	1:54
17.	"Wire To The Head"	2:58
18.	"The World You Have Created"	1:58
19.	"The Hunted"	1:13
20.	"Desert Star Septic (Credits)"	3:49
Total length:		57:51

Bonus tracks (Note: as featured in the digital version)
No.	Title	Length
21.	"Lost Souls"	2:33
22.	"Westray In London"	1:44
23.	"The Lovers (Destroyed)"	1:57
Total length:		64:05

== Reception ==
A review from Evening Standard praised the soundtrack as "ridiculously explicit". Jason Pirodsky of The Prague Reporter called the soundtrack as "terrific Morricone-esque border" which "effortlessly moves from Southern twang to pulsating Euro beats". Pat Padua of the DCist wrote "Daniel Pemberton’s score is, unlike so much movie music these days, unobtrusive".
