= The Awakening (soundtrack) =

The Awakening (Original Motion Picture Soundtrack)

Film score by Daniel Pemberton
- Released: 15 November 2011
- Genre: Film score
- Length: 57:27
- Labels: Screamworks; MovieScore Media
- Producer: Daniel Pemberton

Daniel Pemberton chronology
Enemies of the People (2009)	The Awakening (2011)	Dirk Gently (2012)

The Awakening (Original Motion Picture Soundtrack) is the soundtrack to the 2011 film of the same name directed by Nick Murphy. The original score is composed by Daniel Pemberton in his maiden feature film. Recorded at the Abbey Road Studios with the Chamber Orchestra Of London and Crouch End Festival Chorus, performing the orchestra and choir, the album was released on 15 November 2011 by Screamworks Records through MovieScore Media, and received generally positive reviews.

== Background ==
Pemberton recorded his score at the Abbey Road Studios with a large ensemble orchestra and choir, even with limited resources. However, he recorded some of the music through swanee whistle in his flat and tuned it in his computer. Using time-stretching software, he stretched the sounds of the swanee whistle to create a "foggy" texture and make certain sounds even more creepier. In his blog written for The Guardian, he cited The Third Man (1949), Halloween (1978) Eyes Wide Shut (1999) and Inception (2010) as inspirations to his score as it was "simplistic and more effective".

== Track listing ==
No.	Title	Length
1.	"Seeing Through Ghosts" (Theme from The Awakening)	1:46
2.	"The Séance"	2:07
3.	"'Oh, Coccinelle'/Deep Breaths"	2:22
4.	"High Over Cumbria"	0:56
5.	"Empty Classrooms"	2:15
6.	"Florence Cathcart"	1:55
7.	"Arrival at Rookford"	1:18
8.	"Semper Veritas"	1:32
9.	"Preparations"	1:49
10.	"Chasing Footprints"	3:22
11.	"Lock the House"	1:26
12.	"The Hallway"	1:04
13.	"Scars"	1:07
14.	"There Is Nothing"	0:58
15.	"Don't Go Away"	1:00
16.	"The Dollshouse"	2:31
17.	"No Walls or Floors"	1:43
18.	"Damaged People"	1:08
19.	"Patience"	3:08
20.	"Florence Vanishing"	1:29
21.	"The East Bedroom"	3:33
22.	"Don't Tell Tom"	2:39
23.	"Chorus de Susticatio" (Chorus from The Awakening)	1:57
24.	"A Death Remembered"	1:18
25.	"Be Still My Soul"	4:16
26.	"Florence Is Free"	2:57
27.	"The Awakening" (Credits)	3:20
28.	"Reprise" (Theme from The Awakening)	2:31
Total length:		57:27

== Reception ==
James Southall of Movie Wave praised the soundtrack, calling it, "really solid stuff, worthy of a lot of attention". Matt Goldberg of Collider complimented Pemberton's score as, "beautifully melancholy".

Ridley Scott recruited Pemberton to provide music for The Counselor (2013) after he listened to the score for The Awakening and appreciated his work.

== Personnel ==
Credits adapted from CD liner notes:

- Composer – Daniel Pemberton
- Producer – Daniel Pemberton, Mikael Carlsson
- Engineer – Gordon Davidson
- Recording and mixing – Andrew Dudman
- Mastering – Konstantin Braticevic
- Music supervision – Alison Wright
- Executive producer – Mikael Carlsson
- Orchestra – The Chamber Orchestra Of London
- Orchestrator and conductor – Andrew Skeet
- Concertmaster – Stephanie Gonley
- Contractor – Cool Music Ltd.
- Choir – The Crouch End Festival Chorus
- Choir conductor – David Temple
