= The Man from U.N.C.L.E. (soundtrack) =

The Man from U.N.C.L.E. (Original Motion Picture Soundtrack)

Soundtrack album by Daniel Pemberton
- Released: August 7, 2015
- Recorded: 2014–2015
- Studios: Abbey Road Studios, London
- Genres: Hip hop; classic rock; jazz
- Length: 73:29 (standard); 80:43 (deluxe)
- Label: WaterTower Music
- Producer: Daniel Pemberton

Daniel Pemberton chronology
Cuban Fury (2014)	The Man from U.N.C.L.E. (2015)	Steve Jobs (2015)

The Man from U.N.C.L.E. (Original Motion Picture Soundtrack) is the soundtrack to the Guy Ritchie-directed spy film The Man from U.N.C.L.E. based on the 1964–1968 television series of the same name. Daniel Pemberton scored the original music, in his first big-budget production, who described it as "kaleidoscope of international color" due to its dense, unpredictable blend of styles.

The soundtrack to the film consisting of 24 tracks was released by WaterTower Music on August 7, 2015, a week ahead of the film's release, and a deluxe edition, containing four bonus tracks from Pemberton's score also accompanied the album. It was further released in vinyl at a limited edition of 750 copies in November 2015. The score received critical acclaim, capturing the essence of "vintage action films" through its music.

== Development ==
"The 1960s thing is fun from a musical point-of-view because music was such a strong aspect in culture and in films, so you had a lot more license to be very bold, which as a composer, is very enjoyable [...] In some ways, it's my favorite kind of music from film scores back then. They were a lot more striking and unusual. This is a nostalgic, retro kind of score, but, I think, actually very modern. It's so different from what's coming out in the cinema."

— Pemberton, in an interview to IndieWire on the film's original score

Guy Ritchie recruited Pemberton to score for the film, after being showcased with the list of composers and found Pemberton's work was unique and "didn't sound exactly like everyone else's [in the list]" meeting Ritchie's demands for a unique sound. Instead of having composers creating the score during the end of post-production, Pemberton was involved during the film's edit and closely worked with Ritchie on the soundtrack, sharing a great rapport together.

The recording went for nearly eleven months at Abbey Road Studios, and Pemberton brought individual musicians to come up with different ideas, when the breakthrough came with a bass flute. He said that "We tried a lot of different ideas over the big car chase that opens the movie and Guy felt [the sound] was too predictable [...] And then suddenly I did some work with this amazing flute player Dave Heath who normally plays classical concertos. I was like, 'Show me the crazy noises you can make that no one lets you do.' What he did I thought was really cool, so I started writing something around that sound, recorded it and Guy was really into that and it ended up being a big part of the sound in the film."

Pemberton admitted that music from the 1960s were "bold and striking" and hence he composed the film's music that "came right out the 1960s with a modern flair". The use of vintage equipment while recording the music was not either retro or cool, but "was authentic to the 60s". He used several instruments such as Spanish guitar, electric guitar, accordion, Hammond B3 organ, harpsichord, mandolin, cimbalom, bongos and a variety of percussion instruments to create the sonic palette. Jerry Goldsmith's theme music from the 1964–1968 eponymous television series was not used as the simplicity of the major keys did not fit appropriately with the film's music.

== Track listing ==
The Man from U.N.C.L.E. (Original Motion Picture Soundtrack)
No.	Title	Artist(s)	Length
1.	"Compared to What"	Roberta Flack	5:16
2.	"Out Of The Garage"		3:47
3.	"His Name Is Napoleon Solo"		2:38
4.	"Escape From East Berlin"		4:25
5.	"Jimmy, Renda se"	Tom Zé and Valdez	3:39
6.	"Mission: Rome"		2:40
7.	"The Vinciguerra Affair"		3:22
8.	"Bugs, Beats and Bowties"		1:52
9.	"Cry to Me"	Solomon Burke	2:36
10.	"Five Months, Two Weeks, Two Days"	Louis Prima	2:09
11.	"Signori Toileto Italiano"		2:37
12.	"Breaking In" (Searching the Factory)		3:04
13.	"Breaking Out" (The Cowboy Escapes)		2:04
14.	"Che Vuole Questa Musica Stasera"	Peppino Gagliardi	3:36
15.	"Into The Lair" (Betrayal Part I)		1:47
16.	"Laced Drinks" (Betrayal Part II)		3:40
17.	"Il Mio Regno"	Luigi Tenco	2:23
18.	"Circular Story"		4:03
19.	"The Drums Of War"		5:11
20.	"Take You Down"		3:26
21.	"We Have Location"		2:29
22.	"A Last Drink"		1:48
23.	"Take Care Of Business"	Nina Simone	2:04
24.	"The Unfinished Kiss"		2:53
Total length:			73:29

Deluxe edition
No.	Title	Length
25.	"The Red Mist"	2:10
26.	"The Switch"	0:58
27.	"Warhead"	2:18
28.	"Fists"	1:48
Total length:		80:43

== Reception ==
Music critic Jonathan Broxton wrote "In a year which has produced a number of wonderful espionage scores, ranging from Christophe Beck's Ant-Man to Joe Kraemer's Mission Impossible, Henry Jackman's The Kingsmen and Teddy [Theodore] Shapiro's Spy, and with a Thomas Newman James Bond score to come later in the fall, 2015 has clearly become the year of the secret agent. It would have been very easy for Daniel Pemberton and The Man from U.N.C.L.E. to get lost in the mix. As such, it's a testament to the young Englishman's talent that this score is so enjoyable, and so memorable on its own terms. Slip into something more comfortable, fix yourself a martini, and luxuriate." James Southall of Movie Wave wrote "The Man from UNCLE is a textbook example of how to do homage/pastiche just right – respectful nods, no direct copying, and Pemberton's own musical personality is certainly on display too. Along with his score the album features some great songs, which blend stylistically very well indeed. It sounds effortlessly stylish and cool, though of course in reality an awful lot of effort went into making it sound so effortless." Sean Wilson of MFiles wrote "Daniel Pemberton's score is, like the movie, entirely concerned with style and a casual sense of fun, resisting obvious themes in favour of a whistle-stop tour through the various styles of 1960s film music. However, if the primary aim of a film score is to serve its respective movie (and it clearly is), then Pemberton knocks it out of the park. Beautifully snappy, witty and appealing, the score might be all surface but few others this year have proven as effective or gleefully entertaining."

Mark Olsen of Los Angeles Times complimented Pemberton's work as he "seems to understand the idea of the movie even better than Ritchie" and further wrote "his score featuring breathy flutes, twangy guitar, spooky harpsichord and pounding drums and organ capturing the mixture of pastiche, homage and a twist of the new in a way the rest of the film rarely matches." Tim Grierson of Screen International called the score as "self-consciously groovy and dynamic". Don Kaye Den of Geek called Pemberton's score as "one of the most winning scores of the year" providing a "propulsive, jazzy boost that the film sorely needs". Peter Debruge of Variety commented that Pemberton's "classy jazz" music complements the 1960s action films such as The Thomas Crown Affair (1968) and The Italian Job (1969), along with the action sequences, costume and set design. Deepanjana Pal of Firstpost wrote "Daniel Pemberton delivers a glorious, '60s-inspired soundtrack that informs everything from cinematography to dialogues in U.N.C.L.E." IndieWire listed the score in one of their "30 greatest scores of 2015" in the "special mention" category along with Pemberton's score for Steve Jobs, ranked at third.

== Credits ==
Credits adapted from CD liner notes.

Album credits

- Music composed and produced by – Daniel Pemberton
- Orchestra leader – Robbie Gibbs
- Orchestrator and conductor – Andrew Skeet
- Recording – Sam O'Kell, Rebecca Prosser
- Mixing – Sam O'Kell
- Mastering – Alex Wharton
- Music editor – Simon Changer
- Engineer – Gordon Davidson
- Assistant engineer – Jon Alexander
- Music supervision – Ian Neil
- Executive producer – Guy Ritchie
- Coordinator – Darrell Alexander
- Art direction – Sandeep Sriram
- Photography – Amelia Pemberton, Chloe Pemberton
- Bass – Jon Noyce, Richard Pryce

Performer credits

- Cimbalom – Ed Cervenka
- Drums – Tim Weller
- Organ – Steve Lodder
- Flute – Dave Heath
- Guitar – Huw Davies, John Parricelli, Leo Abrahams
- Handclaps – Sam OKell
- Harmonica – Phillip Achille
- Harpsichord – Andrew Skeet, Karen Glen
- Marxophone – Daniel Pemberton
- Orchestra – Chamber Orchestra Of London
- Percussion – Jeremy Wiles, Paul Clarvis, Rob Farrer, Russell Jordan
- Strings and brass band – Chamber Orchestra Of London
- Trumpet – Gareth Williams
- Vocals – Dave Sanderson, Jay Marsh
