= Peter Ettedgui =

British film writer, director, and producer

- Occupations: Director, writer, and producer for mostly documentary films
- Years active: 1999–present
- Notable work: McQueen (2018); Rising Phoenix (2020); Super/Man: The Christopher Reeve Story (2024)

Peter Ettedgui is a British film writer, director and producer. Along with his professional partner Ian Bonhôte, he has made documentaries including McQueen (2018), Rising Phoenix (2020) and Super/Man: The Christopher Reeve Story (2024).

== Career ==
Ettedgui and Michael Ignatieff co-wrote the screenplay for Onegin, a 1999 romantic drama based on Alexander Pushkin's Eugene Onegin. In 2005, he was a co-producer of Kinky Boots.

Ettedgui wrote the 2018 documentary McQueen about fashion designer Alexander McQueen, and co-directed it with his professional partner Ian Bonhôte. The film was nominated for Outstanding British Film and Best Documentary at the 72nd British Academy Film Awards in 2019.

In 2020, Ettedgui and Bonhôte directed Rising Phoenix, a documentary about the Paralympic Games. Ettedgui, who is Jewish, and Bonhôte, who had a Jewish grandmother who survived the Holocaust, were inspired by the story of Paralympics founder Ludwig Guttmann, who also fled Nazi Germany. The film won the award for Outstanding Long Sports Documentary at the Sports Emmy Awards in 2021. It was a nominee for Best Documentary at the British Independent Film Awards 2021.

Ettedgui and Bonhôte wrote and directed Super/Man: The Christopher Reeve Story about Superman actor Christopher Reeve, in 2024. The film won the award for Best Documentary at the 78th British Academy Film Awards. The pair were also nominated for Outstanding Directing for a Documentary/Nonfiction Program and Outstanding Writing for a Nonfiction Program at the 77th Primetime Emmy Awards.

== Personal life ==
Ettedgui's father Joseph Ettedgui, who was born in Morocco, founded the Joseph fashion brand.

In November 2025, Ettedgui publicly alleged that Reform UK leader Nigel Farage had racially abused him when they were classmates at Dulwich College in the late 1970s. Farage responded by stating: "I categorically deny saying those things, to that one individual", which Ettedgui said was "fundamentally dishonest".
