= The Trial of the Chicago 7 (soundtrack) =

The Trial of the Chicago 7 (Music from the Netflix Film)

Soundtrack album by Daniel Pemberton
- Released: October 16, 2020
- Studio: Abbey Road Studios
- Genre: Film soundtrack
- Length: 53:46
- Label: Varèse Sarabande
- Producer: Daniel Pemberton

Daniel Pemberton chronology
Enola Holmes (2020)	The Trial of the Chicago 7 (2020)	Rising Phoenix (2020)

Singles from The Trial of the Chicago 7 (Music from the Netflix Film)
- 1. "Hear My Voice" Released: September 30, 2020; 2. "Blood on the Streets" Released: October 9, 2020

The Trial of the Chicago 7 (Music from the Netflix Film) is the soundtrack to the 2020 film The Trial of the Chicago 7, directed by Aaron Sorkin. Daniel Pemberton composed the film score in his third collaboration with Sorkin after Steve Jobs (2015) (Note: Sorkin wrote the script of Steve Jobs.) and Molly's Game (2017). The soundtrack, which features three original songs performed by British singer Celeste, was released digitally under American record label Varèse Sarabande and Universal Music Group on October 16, 2020. A physical CD edition of the soundtrack was released on November 20.

== Background ==
Pemberton had composed the film score during the COVID-19 pandemic lockdown at his studio in London, but he could not record the score due to the pandemic restrictions. When the restrictions were partially lifted during late-2020, Pemberton managed to record the score, which took place in Studio Two at Abbey Road Studios. The score was conducted by Sam Okell, with assistance from Christopher Parker and Jack Thomason. The string session, consisted of 40 players recording the tracks, as Pemberton stated that "A lot of the score is actually about detail rather than numbers, so stuff like the riot cues and the opening, a lot of that is not about numbers, it's about capturing those details."

While, there had no plans for incorporating songs in the film, three original songs were composed and had performed by British singer Celeste. The track "Hear My Voice" was served as the lead single and was released on September 30, 2020. Prior to the official release, "Hear My Voice" was submitted to the 93rd Academy Awards for Best Original Song in September 2020. Sorkin initially wanted to reuse The Beatles' track "Here Comes the Sun" (1969), to feature in the end-credits to conclude the film "with a note of positivity, a moment of light and hope at the end". But, as the track being incorporated by several artists, including Pemberton for Yesterday (2019), (Note: Based on the eponymous 1965 song, Pemberton had incorporated several tracks of Beatles' in the film.) he decided against it. As a result, "Hear My Voice" was composed. Celeste's vocals were approved by Pemberton, as "it takes back to the courtroom period of 1969".

The score was built on four key sequences: the opening, the two riot sequences and the conclusion. In the first meeting with Pemberton and Solkin, the former submitted four cues for the scenes, which Solkin stated that "everything is relying on these moments for the film to work as a whole. It's not like underscore". He identified these sequences as the musical pillars of the film and wanted to be "strongly cinematic". Pemberton later composed "Hear My Voice", which Solkin felt that the score was subtly changed. He explained, in an interview to The Wrap, saying "Everything moves toward that song – the whole score is constructed to end on that song. When I first wrote it, the melody got reversed-engineered into the whole score. So that by the time it comes at the end, you've had it hinted at a number of different places in the score, and that's the moment it all comes together." "Blood on the Streets" was released as a promotional single on October 9, 2020. Following, the digital and physical releases, a Vinyl edition of the soundtrack was released on February 26, 2021.

== Track listing ==
All music is composed by Daniel Pemberton.

The Trial of the Chicago 7 (Music from the Netflix Film)
No.	Title	Artist(s)	Length
1.	"Hear My Dream"	Daniel Pemberton; Celeste	1:25
2.	"We're Going to Chicago"	Pemberton	6:17
3.	"The Trial"	Pemberton	4:38
4.	"Conspiracy Office"	Pemberton	1:12
5.	"My Life"	Pemberton	1:33
6.	"Sequestering the Jury"	Pemberton	1:18
7.	"Meet the Police"	Pemberton	0:52
8.	"Take the Hill (Hear My Screams)"	Pemberton	6:14
9.	"Riot Aftermath"	Pemberton	1:40
10.	"Don't Stand"	Pemberton	2:19
11.	"Star Witness"	Pemberton	2:31
12.	"Motion Denied"	Pemberton	3:30
13.	"Blood on the Streets"	Pemberton	7:01
14.	"Trial Day 151"	Pemberton	3:11
15.	"Stand Up (The Chicago 7)"	Pemberton	3:41
16.	"Hear My Voice"	Celeste	3:05
17.	"Take the Hill (Hear My Screams)"	Pemberton; Celeste	3:19
Total length:			53:46

== Accolades ==
Award	Date of ceremony	Category	Recipient(s)	Result	Ref.
Academy Awards	25 April 2021	Best Original Song	"Hear My Voice" – Daniel Pemberton and Celeste Waite	Nominated	
Golden Globe Awards	1 March 2021	Best Original Song	"Hear My Voice" – Daniel Pemberton and Celeste Waite	Nominated	
Hollywood Music in Media Awards	27 January 2021	Best Original Score in a Feature Film	Daniel Pemberton	Nominated	
Hollywood Music in Media Awards	27 January 2021	Best Original Song in a Feature Film	"Hear My Voice" – Daniel Pemberton and Celeste Waite	Nominated	
Satellite Awards	15 February 2021	Best Original Song	"Hear My Voice" – Daniel Pemberton and Celeste Waite	Nominated	
