= Raëd Abillama Architects =

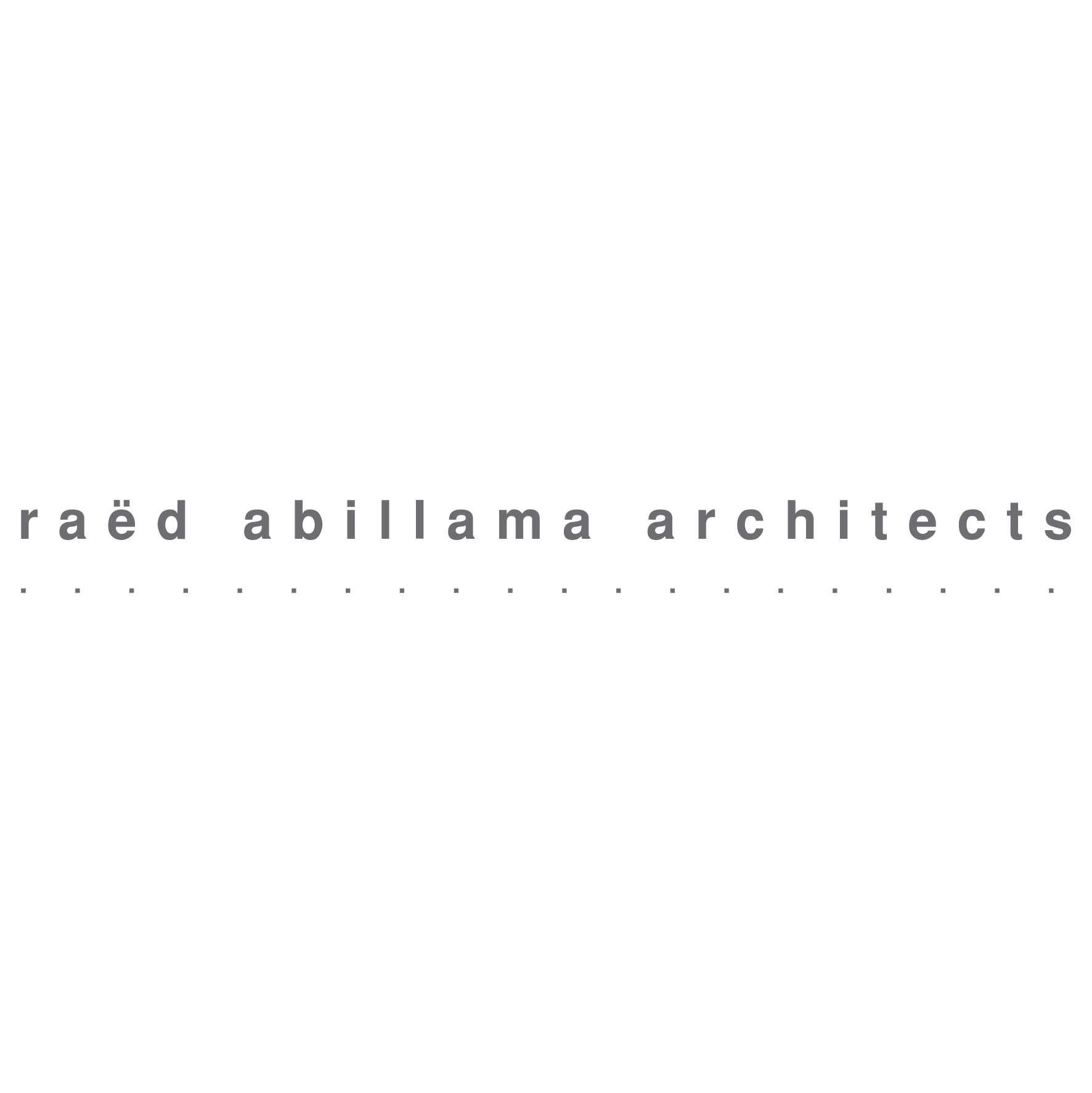
- Company type: Private
- Industry: Architectural Design
- Founded: 1997
- Headquarters: Lebanon
- Key people: Raëd Abillama
- Website: raarchitects.com

Raëd Abillama Architects is an architectural firm based in Lebanon and founded by Raëd Abillama in 1997 after returning from the United States where he pursued his studies.

Its projects are primarily located in Lebanon. The firm has been responsible for the construction of various homes and villas, along with the winery for IXSIR, the headquarters for Mitsulift. and the First National Bank and the extension of the National Museum of Beirut. Its scope encompasses architectural projects of various types: commercial, retail, offices, residential and interior design. The company has been granted multiple awards, among them the Aga Khan Award for Architecture, Good Green Architecture and the Architizer A+ POP Award.

== History ==
Raëd Abillama attended Rhode Island School of Design, graduating with a Bachelor of Architecture degree in 1993, and obtained his Master of Architectural Design degree from Columbia University in 1994. After graduation Abillama moved to Lebanon where he founded Raëd Abillama Architects, his architectural firm.

Since then, it offers services for architectural, interior and industrial design. In 1999, 2001 and 2007 the firm was selected for the Aga Khan Award for Architecture. Beirut Pine Forest wins the Silver Award - Africa Middle East for “Evergreen City, Urban Pine Forest Rehabilitation", in 2004. A year later, the company is a finalist for the YCE Design Award.

Completed in 2012, Mitsulift's headquarters in Lebanon has a number of distinguished features: The windows built at floor-to-ceiling height and placed in the shade maximize natural sunlight penetration, whereas the facades are designed to reduce the impact of direct light, and thus minimize the heat intake.

In late 2013, Raëd Abillama Architects completes the restoration of IXSIR's 380-year-old winery located in Basbina, outside Batroun in Lebanon. The project went on winning the POP Architizer A+ Award in the same year, being featured in CNN's Greenest buildings of 2011 and was awarded the Green Good Design.

In the same year, the firm also completes the construction of Fidar Beach House in Byblos, Lebanon, along with several villas that received important media coverage. It wins the Good Green Architecture again for Faqra Degrees, their residential project in Lebanon.

Later that year, the office was commissioned to build an extension to the National Museum of Beirut. It is currently under construction

Raëd Abillama Architects also designed fashion brand Joseph's store in Beirut. It was built and open in early 2014 and went on to feature in Global Blue magazine in April 2014.

In 2015, the construction of the First National Bank Headquarters starts in Beirut. Mainly recognized by its louvered facades and textured concrete, it wins, in 2016, the Green Good Design Award.

== Projects ==
- Mitsulift - Lebanon Headquarters (2012) - Completed
- Fidar Beach House - Jbeil, Lebanon(2013) - Completed
- IXSIR Winery - Basbina, Lebanon (2013) - Completed
- Joseph Fashion - Beirut, Lebanon(2014) - Completed
- First National Bank Headquarters - Beirut, Lebanon(2015) - Under Construction
- National Museum of Beirut Extension - Beirut Lebanon (2014) - Under Construction
- Abi Chelsea - Chelsea, Manhattan, New York - Under Construction
