= Ben Crompton =

English actor and standup comedian (born 1974)

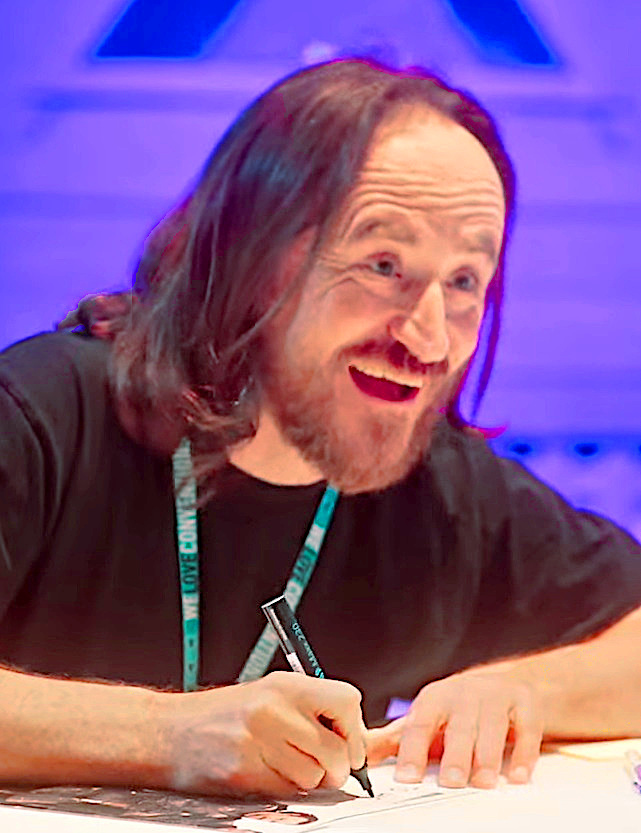
- Crompton at the 2024 German Comic Con Babelsberg
- Born: Benjamin Lorton Crompton; 1974 (age 51–52); Stockport, Greater Manchester, England
- Occupation: Actor
- Years active: 1996–present
- Spouse: Liv Lorent (m. 2008)
- Children: 2

Benjamin Lorton Crompton (born 1974) is an English actor and stand-up comedian, has appeared on the BBC sketch show Man Stroke Woman and as Colin in the BBC Three sitcom Ideal from 2005 to 2011). Crompton portrayed Eddison Tollett on the HBO high-fantasy series Game of Thrones from 2012 to 2019.

Other credits include All or Nothing (2002), Clocking Off (2001-2003), The Mayor of Casterbridge (2003), Housewife, 49, Pramface (2012-2014), The Great Fire (2014), The Suspicions of Mr Whicher, Blood (2012), Zapped (2017), Motherland (2017), Vera (2018), Marcella (2018), Peterloo (2018), and Rebecca (2020).

== Career ==
Crompton appeared in the 2002 film All or Nothing (2002), the TV series Clocking Off (2001-2003), he worked alongside Ciarán Hinds in The Mayor of Casterbridge (2003), and with Victoria Wood in the Television movie Housewife, 49. He played Ewan in 102 Dalmatians, and appeared as Colin in the BBC Three sitcom Ideal from 2005–2011.

He was Keith in the BBC Three series Pramface from 2012 until 2014. In 2011, he appeared as William Nutt in the television film The Suspicions of Mr Whicher, for ITV. In 2012, he appeared in the film Blood.

He appeared in both series of the BBC TV sketch show Man Stroke Woman.

He has had a recurring role as Eddison Tollett since Season 2 of the television fantasy drama series Game of Thrones.

In 2014, he appeared as a ship's officer in the second episode of series 8 of the Doctor Who television series, "Into the Dalek", and as Mr. Bagwell in the ITV drama The Great Fire.

In 2016, he appeared in the music video "Old Skool" by English electronic group Metronomy.

== Personal life ==
In 2008, Crompton married Liv Lorent, together they have two children.

== Filmography ==
=== Film ===
Year	Film	Role	Director	Notes
1998	Les Misérables	Grantaire	Bille August	
1998	Romeo Thinks Again	Kevin	Matthew Parkhill	Short film
2000	102 Dalmatians	Ewan	Kevin Lima	
2001	Blow Dry	Saul	Paddy Breathnach	
2002	All or Nothing	Craig	Mike Leigh	
2004	Nits	Dad	Harry Wootliff	Short film
2005	Piccadilly Jim	Young Butler #2	John McKay	
2005	Pitch Perfect	Bob	J Blakeson	Short film
2008	Ripple	Martin	Paul Gowers	Short film
2009	The Appointment	Danny	J Blakeson	Short film
2009	Nativity!	Parent	Debbie Isitt	
2009	Radio Mania: An Abandoned Work	Martian X	Iain Forsyth; Jane Pollard	Short film
2009	King Jeff	King Mike	Phil Dale	Short film
2010	The Balloon	Jimmy	Tom Whitemore	Short film
2011	Kill List	Justin	Ben Wheatley	
2012	Blood	Jason Buliegh	Nick Murphy	
2014	Before I Go to Sleep	Warehouse Caretaker	Rowan Joffé	
2018	Peterloo	Tuke, The Painter	Mike Leigh	
2020	Rebecca	Ben	Ben Wheatley	
2021	Off the Record	Himself	Michal Špitálský	student project
2024	Bad Tidings	Big Barry Brennan	Tim Kirkby	

=== Television ===
Year	Title	Role	Notes
1996	The Thin Blue Line	Protester	Episode: "Road Rage"
1998	The Life and Crimes of William Palmer	Charles Newton	Television miniseries
1998	City Central	Kevin Hadley	Episode: "Parallel Lines"
1998	Dalziel and Pascoe	Olly	Episode: "The Wood Beyond"
1998	Norman Ormal: A Very Political Turtle	Liam Gallagher	Television film
1999	Butterfly Collectors	Billy Johnson	Television miniseries
1999	Love in the 21st Century	Spencer	
1999	All the King's Men	Private Davy Croft	Television film
1999	Doomwatch: Winter Angel	Ewan McAllister	Television film
2000	North Square	Greaterix	Episode: "Winning and Losing"
2002	Silent Witness	Jamie Irons	Episode: "Kith and Kill"
2001–2003	Clocking Off	Barney Watson	19 episodes
2003	The Mayor of Casterbridge	Abel Whittle	Television film
2003	Sweet Medicine	Ian	Episode: Series 1, Episode 5
2004	North & South	Inspector Mason	Episode: Series 1, Episode 3
2005–2011	Ideal	Colin	39 episodes
2005	New Tricks	Paul	Episode: "Trust Me"
2005	Heartbeat	Matt Cartwright	Episode: "Family Ties"
2005	ShakespeaRe-Told	Snug	Episode: "A Midsummer Night's Dream"
2005	The Slavery Business: How to Make a Million from Slavery	Hodge	Television film
2005–2007	Man Stroke Woman	Various characters	12 episodes
2006	The Outsiders	Claude Truffaut	Television film
2006	Housewife, 49	Arthur Last	Television film
2008	Midsomer Murders	Spud	Episode: "Left for Dead"
2008	Caught in a Trap	Steve Campbell	Television film
2009	Collision	Harry Canwell	Television miniseries
2010	Terry Pratchett's Going Postal	Mad Al	Television film
2011	The Sinking of the Laconia	Harry Townes	Television miniseries
2011	The Suspicions of Mr Whicher: The Murder at Road Hill House	William Nutt	Television film
2012–2014	Pramface	Keith Prince	17 episodes
2012–2019	Game of Thrones	Eddison Tollett	34 episodes
2012	Hit & Miss	Liam	6 episodes
2014	Doctor Who	Ross	Episode: "Into the Dalek"
2014	The Great Fire	Mr. Bagwell	Television miniseries
2016	Comedy Playhouse	Sid	Episode: "Broken Biscuits"
2017–2022	Strike	Shanker	4 episodes
2017	Zapped	Jones the Anvil	Episode: "The Trial"
2017	Motherland	Animal man	Episode: "The Birthday Party"
2018	Vera	Jason Glenn	Episode: "Home"
2018	Marcella	Cole	2 episodes
2023	Lockwood & Co.	Julius Winkman	5 episode
2023	The Full Monty	Miller	1 episode
2023	COBRA	Henry Wicks	5 episodes
2026	VisionQuest	Clancy	2 episodes
