= Steve Jobs (soundtrack) =

Steve Jobs: Original Motion Picture Soundtrack

Soundtrack album by Daniel Pemberton
- Released: October 9, 2015
- Genres: Alternative rock; indie pop; electronic; orchestral
- Length: 82:04
- Label: Back Lot Music
- Producer: Daniel Pemberton

Daniel Pemberton chronology
The Man from U.N.C.L.E. (2015)	Steve Jobs (2015)	From the Land of the Moon (2016)

Steve Jobs: Original Motion Picture Soundtrack is the soundtrack album to the 2015 film Steve Jobs, directed by Danny Boyle and written by Aaron Sorkin, based on the life of Apple Inc. co-founder Steve Jobs. Daniel Pemberton composed the film score in his maiden collaboration with Boyle. He split the score into three parts: analog, orchestral and digital, and had blended electronic and orchestral score as the film takes place during 1984–1998.

Apart from Pemberton's score, the soundtrack album also features songs by The Libertines, Bob Dylan and The Maccabees. It was released digitally on October 9, 2015, followed by a physical release on October 23, by Back Lot Music. A two-disc vinyl set was released on February 5, 2016. The soundtrack received positive response from critics, praising Pemberton's instrumentation and musical approach, and received a nomination at the 73rd Golden Globe Awards for Best Original Score.

== Background ==
Similar to the film's visual approach, (Note: Danny Boyle had split the film into three sections: the first act revolves around Job's vision – according to screenwriter Aaron Sorkin, it revolves around the introduction of Apple Computer in 1984. The second act focuses on his revenge – Job left Apple in 1985, launched his newly-formed company NeXT and released his first product NeXT Computer in 1988. The third and final act revolves around his wisdom – his return to Apple and the launch of IMac in 1998.) the score is divided into three distinguishable sections revolving around, corresponding to the intended feel of the act in which the section is heard. Pemberton said that the first act consists of analog, the second act being orchestral and the third act which is digital. For the first act's composition, Pemberton primarily used analog synthesizers, in particular ones released no later than 1984 – the time the first act takes place – such as the Roland SH-1000 and Yamaha CS-80. According to Pemberton, in that period, "synthesizers reflected an optimism and futuristic feel" while also becoming "nostalgic". While scoring for that segment, Pemberton experienced few drawbacks, as he could only record one note at a time, and need to play everything by hand, and if the ancient synthesisers "get cold or being heated, it might go out of tune".

"It was incredibly difficult. You're basically writing a 10-minute symphony that has to have complete musicality, rather than just score, but at the same time, it has to respond to everything that's happening in the picture, which was constantly being tweaked and reedited."

— Daniel Pemberton, on composing the 10-minute track "Revenge"

The second act's score is more classical and operatic in nature, matching the setting of the San Francisco Opera House. He called the setting as "the most difficult" as Boyle sent him proposed notes during filming, and had to write 10-minute symphony (which was later entitled as "Revenge") for multiple instances. Pemberton recorded lengthy orchestral pieces, inspired from Gioachino Rossini and Giuseppe Verdi's compositions, with arias in Italian. The third and final act featured a more introspective score produced entirely digitally to complement its backdrop of the 1998 iMac product launch, and Pemberton correspondingly used his own iMac with MacOS (Apple software) to compose this section as "more experimental sound textures, sound design are featured inside the computer". He called it as the "most ambient, cold, introspective and emotive act" in the film.

The soundtrack also features songs by The Libertines, Bob Dylan and The Maccabees. The Maccabees' "Grew Up At Midnight", the song that played during the film's concluding scene, was reportedly chosen by Danny Boyle himself, who is a fan of the band. Other songs were considered for the final scene, even Pemberton's own score, before the song was chosen.

== Track listing ==
No.	Title	Artist(s)	Length
1.	"The Musicians Play Their Instruments?"	Daniel Pemberton	1:04
2.	"It's Not Working"	Daniel Pemberton	3:44
3.	"Child (Father)"	Daniel Pemberton	1:49
4.	"Jack It Up"	Daniel Pemberton	3:59
5.	"The Circus of Machines I (Overture)"	Daniel Pemberton	2:58
6.	"Russian Roulette"	Daniel Pemberton	1:46
7.	"Change the World"	Daniel Pemberton	5:09
8.	"The Skylab Plan"	Daniel Pemberton	5:01
9.	"Don't Look Back into the Sun"	The Libertines	3:01
10.	"...I Play the Orchestra"	Daniel Pemberton	2:22
11.	"The Circus of Machines II (Allegro)"	Daniel Pemberton	4:30
12.	"Revenge"	Daniel Pemberton	9:38
13.	"Rainy Day Women #12 & 35"	Bob Dylan	4:37
14.	"It's an Abstract"	Daniel Pemberton	2:27
15.	"Life Out of Balance"	Daniel Pemberton	4:06
16.	"I Wrote Ticket to Ride"	Daniel Pemberton	2:59
17.	"The Nature of People"	Daniel Pemberton	4:04
18.	"1998. The New Mac"	Daniel Pemberton	2:10
19.	"Father (Child)"	Daniel Pemberton	3:27
20.	"Remember"	Daniel Pemberton	4:11
21.	"Grew Up at Midnight"	The Maccabees	4:00
22.	"Shelter from the Storm"	Bob Dylan	5:02
Total length:			82:04

== Reception and analysis ==
Critics analysed the instrumentation and approach made for the film's score. Filmitracks wrote "Pemberton's fine score is not complex, it's somewhat like the uncluttered and to-the-point soundtrack's cover which in itself is based on Apple's clear and low key text and image presentation. It's mostly electronic and simplistic with a little opera thrown in." Carly Mallenbaum of USA Today had noticed that, in the first act, the score cue resembled one of Vangelis' theme from the Chariots of Fire (1981), during the Apple launch. Peter Bradshaw of The Guardian, stated "Daniel Pemberton's musical score jitters each scene to a nerve-jangling climax". The Daily Californian's Kyle Kizu stated about the musical score saying, "Pemberton showcases incredible versatility. He utilizes computer sounds for intriguing moments, while opting for operatic orchestration during grandiose scenes — something that helps craft the Shakespearean figure of Jobs." The Independent-based critic Geoffrey Macnab praised the technical aspects, including the music and sound design, saying "Daniel Pemberton's score captured everything that happened perfectly, the music simply moulded with the individual scenes plots astoundingly well. As well as a good score, the sound editing also showed scenes of great cinematic quality, such as the stomping of feet, or the echoes of conversation when Hoffman listens to Jobs's exchanges with Wozniak and Sculley." The score received a nomination for Golden Globe Award for Best Original Score. The score, was also shortlisted for the nomination of Best Original Score category at the 88th Academy Awards, but due to its underwhelming performance at the box-office, it heavily impacted the awards prospects, and the film missed out several nominations at the ceremony, including the Original Score category; although Fassbender and Winslet received Academy Award nominations for Best Actor and Best Supporting Actress.
