= Joseph Ettedgui =

Morocco-born, British fashion designer (1936–2010)

- Born: 22 February 1936; Casablanca, Morocco
- Died: 18 March 2010 (aged 74); London, United Kingdom
- Other name: Joseph
- Occupations: Entrepreneur and founder of Joseph brand
- Spouse: Isabel Pritchard (m. 1990)
- Children: 3, including Peter

Joseph Ettedgui (22 February 1936 – 18 March 2010) was a Moroccan-born London-based retailer and founder of the Joseph retail empire. After his death, the chair of the British Fashion Council Harold Tillman described him as: "a great designer, retailer and entrepreneur". Le Figaro fashion editor Godfrey Deeny has described him as: "one of the half dozen greatest fashion retailers in the past half-century".

== Early life and career ==
Born in Casablanca, Morocco, on February 22, 1936, Joseph Ettedgui was the son of a Moroccan Jewish furniture retailer. Joseph’s father considered retailing to be a degrading profession and hoped his son would become a doctor or lawyer. Joseph had no such ambitions and moved to London with his brother Maurice in 1960 to train as a hairdresser. Two years later the brothers opened a hairdressing salon (Salon 33) in King's Road, Chelsea – one of the epicentres of Swinging London. In 1964, their brother Franklin joined them. In an interview in 1989 with the Jewish Chronicle, Joseph said: "I really wanted to be an architect but I'm terribly impatient. I decided to take a course in hairdressing and I loved it; I loved the way you could transform someone in two hours".

== Move into fashion retail ==
Joseph Ettedgui began travelling to Paris to see the ready-to-wear collections. This led to a meeting and early business association with Japanese designer Kenzo Takada. He began to sell Kenzo sweaters in Salon 33, and in 1972 the first Joseph clothes store opened underneath the hairdressing premises. Kenzo sweaters in the store’s window were spotted by then Sunday Times fashion editor Michael Roberts and used in a photo shoot – a move credited with simultaneously launching both minimalist European fashion and the Joseph retail name to a wider UK audience.

A high-tech Norman Foster-designed flagship store opened in Sloane Street, Knightsbridge in 1979, after which Joseph Ettedgui’s place as a retail pioneer was cemented. During the 1980s, own-brand knitwear and clothing were introduced. The Joseph brand expanded into restaurants (Joe’s Café) and homeware (Joseph Pour la Maison). Stores opened across London and other major fashion centres, including New York, Paris and Tokyo.

== Influence and legacy ==
Joseph Ettedgui assisted emerging fashion designers, including Margaret Howell, Katharine Hamnett, John Galliano and Azzedine Alaïa. He also championed architects and interior designers, working with names such as David Chipperfield and Eva Jiricna. British fashion designer John Richmond called him: "the creator of modern retail" and Italian designer and entrepreneur Miuccia Prada commented that Joseph's shops were: "among the most beautiful in the world". London-based Saks Fifth Avenue merchandise director Gail Sackloff recalled how her visiting American fashion buyers always wanted to visit Joseph stores in the 1980s because of the way he merchandised.

== Later ventures ==
After selling the Joseph brand outright to its Japanese licensee in 2005, Joseph Ettedgui turned his attention and fortune to Connolly Luxury Goods, an offshoot of Connolly Leather, and the Belgravia Italian restaurant Il Vaporetto. As of November 2020, the Connolly retail business remains in the ownership of his widow, Isabel.

== Personal life ==
Ettedgui married Edna Herz in 1959. They had two sons, Peter and Paul. He married second wife Isabel Pritchard in 1990. They had a daughter, Gigi. Peter Ettedgui became a documentary film maker.
