= Beatrice Vio =

Italian wheelchair fencer

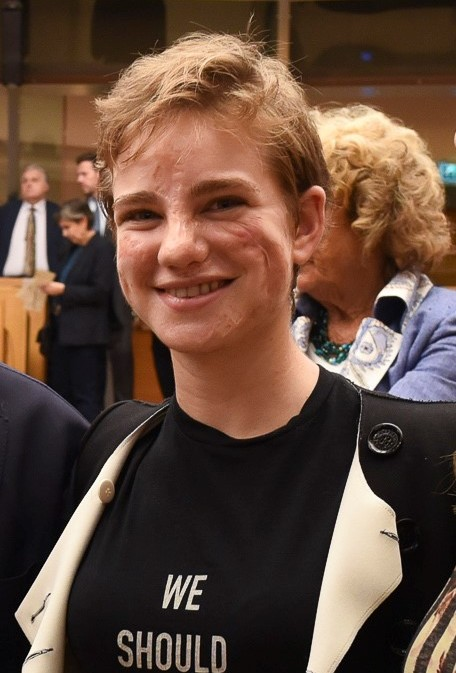
- Bebe Vio in 2018

Personal information
- Full name: Beatrice Maria Adelaide Marzia Vio Grandis
- Nickname: Bebe Vio
- Born: Beatrice Maria Adelaide Marzia Vio; 4 March 1997 (age 29) Venice, Italy
- Website: bebevio.com

Fencing career
- Sport: Fencing
- Country: Italy
- Weapon: foil
- Hand: left-handed
- National coach: Simone Vanni
- Club: Scherma Mogliano
- Head coach: Federica Berton, Alice Esposito
Medal record
Event	1st	2nd	3rd
Paralympic Games	2	1	3
World Championships	3	0	0
European Championships	4	1	0
Total	9	2	3
Summer Paralympics
Gold medal – first place	2016 Rio de Janeiro	Foil B
Gold medal – first place	2020 Tokyo	Foil B
Silver medal – second place	2020 Tokyo	Team foil
Bronze medal – third place	2016 Rio de Janeiro	Team foil
Bronze medal – third place	2024 Paris	Foil B
Bronze medal – third place	2024 Paris	Team foil

Beatrice Maria Adelaide Marzia Vio Grandis (born 4 March 1997), known as Bebe Vio, is an Italian wheelchair fencer, the 2014 and 2016 European champion, 2015 and 2017 World champion, and 2016 and 2020 Paralympic champion in the foil B category.

== Life ==
Bebe Vio was born in Venice on 4 March 1997 as the second of three siblings and raised in Mogliano Veneto. In her childhood she pursued three passions, which she dubs "the three S's": school (scuola in Italian), fencing (scherma), which she took up when she was five, and scouting (scoutismo).

In late 2008, when she was 11 years old, she contracted meningitis. In order to save her life, doctors had to amputate both her legs at the knee, and both her forearms. After more than three months of intensive rehabilitation she was able to return to fencing. In 2009 her parents founded the non-profit organization Art4sport Onlus, which promotes sport for young amputees.

In May 2023, she graduated from Communication and International Relations at John Cabot University in Rome. Vio is the namesake of the Trojan asteroid 111571 Bebevio.

== Athletics ==
Vio is a champion wheelchair fencer. She uses a special prosthetics to hold her foil, fencing from the shoulder. Under the coaching of Federica Berton and Alice Esposito, she took part in her first wheelchair fencing competition in 2010.

The 2012 Summer Paralympics were too early in her career for her to take part, but she was chosen as a torchbearer for the opening ceremony after an online campaign where more than 1,000 people emailed the International Paralympic Committee to support her candidacy. In 2013, she won her first World Cup in Montreal after she defeated Olympic silver medalist Gyöngyi Dani. For this performance she was named paralympic athlete of the month by the International Paralympic Committee.

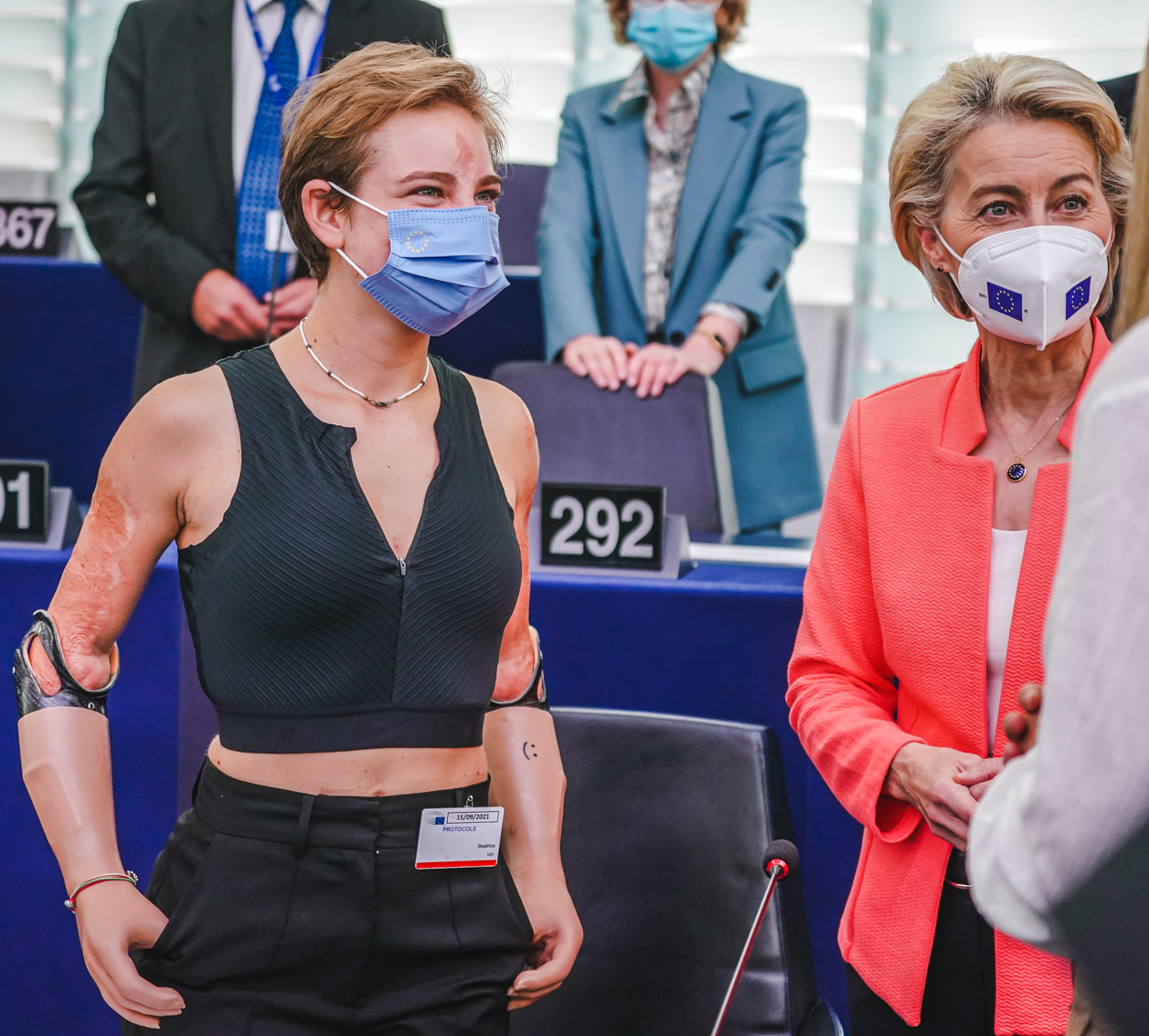
Vio at the State of the European Union with Ursula von der Leyen in September 2021

In the early 2013–14 season, she paused to focus on her studies, but she returned in June and won both the individual and team competition at the European Championships. At the end of the year, the Italian Paralympics Committee awarded her the distinction of "Italian Paralympic Athlete of the Year", a title shared with Oxana Corso. In 2015, she became world champion after she defeated Dani 15–4 in the final. She was named an ambassador for the Milan Expo 2015 and she published her autobiography, Mi hanno regalato un sogno.

In the 2015–16 season, she received the Edoardo Mangiarotti award from the Italian Olympic Committee. She won her second European title in Casale Monferrato, prevailing over Russian Irina Mishurova. In July she lost in the final of the Warsaw World Cup to Russian Viktoria Boykova, which ended her streak of 11 consecutive victories in World Cup events. She however qualified to the 2016 Summer Paralympics as the top-ranked fencer in her category. In Rio she came out of the pool stage undefeated, winning her five pool bouts on 5–0. In the quarterfinals, she defeated Poland's Marta Makowska on 15–6, then overcame defending Paralympic champion, China's Fang Yao, on 15–1. On 14 September, in the final, she met China's Jingjing Zhou. After she took an early lead, the bout was interrupted when the tip of her opponent's foil went accidentally into her mask. After ice was applied, she went on to win 15–7, earning Paralympic gold.

She received the America Award of the Italy-USA Foundation in 2018. On 19 September 2018, after beating Russian opponent Irina Misurova, Vio was crowned European champion for the third time. She later participated in the 2020 Summer Paralympics, held the following year in Tokyo. On 28 August 2021, after defeating Zhou Jingjing a second time, she won another gold medal in the wheelchair fencing foil individual event. In 2020, she starred in the documentary film Rising Phoenix.

== Advocacy ==
As a result of her illness and her recovery, Vio has become "a fierce campaigner for early vaccination".

== Bibliography ==
- Mi hanno regalato un sogno, English translation: They gifted me a dream (2015, Rizzoli Libri, Milan; ISBN 978-88-586-7878-7)
- Se sembra impossibile allora si può fare, English translation: If it seems impossible then it can be done (2017, Rizzoli Libri, Milan; ISBN 978-88-17-09713-0)
