= Enola Holmes (soundtrack) =

Enola Holmes (Music from the Netflix Film)

Film score by Daniel Pemberton
- Released: September 23, 2020
- Recorded: 2019–2020
- Studios: Abbey Road Studios; AIR Studios
- Genre: Film score
- Length: 1:06:32
- Label: Milan
- Producer: Daniel Pemberton

Daniel Pemberton chronology
Birds of Prey (2020)	Enola Holmes (2020)	The Trial of the Chicago 7 (2020)

Singles from Enola Holmes (Music from the Netflix Film)
- 1. "Enola Holmes (Wild Child)" Released: September 11, 2020

Enola Holmes (Music from the Netflix Film) is a film score soundtrack composed by Daniel Pemberton for the 2020 film of the same name. Pemberton described the score as a "blend of melodic and emotional orchestral music coupled with a nice level of messy quirky oddness". The score was released by Milan Records on September 23, 2020, the same day as the film. A vinyl edition of the soundtrack was released on June 4, 2021. The score received positive responses and praise from critics.

== Development ==
In July 2019, Daniel Pemberton was announced as composer of the film's score. Having previously worked with director Harry Bradbeer on television shows, Pemberton discussed with him, to create a "score full of themes, mystery and surprise that both encapsulated her character but also taking audiences on her journey". He thought Enola Holmes was very different from a typical Sherlock Holmes character and liked what he did, but felt that he could bring a bit of his own personality, which was a major concern, as multiple composers had worked on several media adaptations based on the character — most notably Hans Zimmer and Lorne Balfe's score for Guy Ritchie's film adaptation series, David Arnold and Michael Price's score for the subsequent television series and Bruce Broughton's score for Young Sherlock Holmes (1985). Pemberton called the score as "quite a conventional straight orchestral score" which is different from what he usually scores, and attributed it as having "got the sort of magic of Harry Potter in a way".

Bradbeer was keen on having very strong themes, as according to Pemberton, "often you don't get someone actually asking for themes. Lots of directors sort of say they want themes but they actually don't - as soon as they get big strong melodies they start to get a bit scared. Whereas Harry really did want themes. I played around with a few ideas, but we hadn't really nailed them yet." He then recorded those themes at his house during Christmas of 2019; Pemberton used his old piano and had recorded several tunes on his iPhone before sending them to Bradbeer, who responded positively agreeing to work with the film. He then turned this pre-recorded material into score cues. These tracks were converted into three main themes: a theme for Enola, Tewkesbury and what Pemberton called it as "the mystery adventure theme". He also added multiple variations of the themes that were featured throughout the film.

For Enola's theme, he used an oboe as the foremost instrument as Pemberton "wanted to do something that had an energetic drive to it but that felt a bit more wonky and eccentric. Enola as a character is quite tactile and rough. She's not poised or necessarily elegant in the way people normally perceive that ideal". Hence he wanted a sound that is "rough and tumble", and added that "the more bangy piano sound was a really good way to get that rhythm going. Then I wanted something that floated on top of that – that captured another side to her – but I also wanted something that was a solo instrument. Her name is Enola which is 'alone' backwards, so I wanted something that very much captured just one individual. And the oboe just seemed to work really well, and it doesn't get used that much. It's a really beautiful sound, and it also feels very British to me. So it felt like a good way to introduce her and the world and start the film."

Pemberton added that in Enola Holmes, the "over-the-top scoring" synchronised well with the film, as with orchestral scores "there are zillions of very good sample sets that allow you to write orchestral music, whereas most of my other projects… all the things I want to do, don't exist. So I have to make them or build them or find a way around [...] there's already a lot of great orchestral music in the world, so I'm always trying to do something different. But with this, it felt like that was the most right thing for the film, and so it was really fun for me just to really concentrate more on melody and big emotion." He also recorded a squeaky door-slamming sound in an Airbnb, while holidaying in Greece.

== Reception ==
The music received critical acclaim. Jonathan Broxton wrote "every single part of Enola Holmes is just superb. The three main themes are memorable in their own way, and the way that Pemberton constantly finds new ways to adapt them, arrange them, change the instrumentation, and find new emotional messages, is very impressive. The depth and intricacy of the orchestrations means that the score is never dull; there's always a new sound combination, or a new texture, just around the corner. Fans of the quintessentially 'English' sound in film music will find it in abundance here, and those who were also drawn to Hans Zimmer and David Arnold's respective musical interpretations of the Holmes legacy will also find that a lot of this score occasionally treads similar paths." James Southall of Movie Wave wrote "Enola Holmes is a delightful score – it's conventional by recent Pemberton standards but still features a number of quirks and it feels so continually fresh and energetic" and concluded it as "one of the year's strongest scores and an album which will reward repeated listens".

Filmtracks.com wrote "Enola Holmes is a mixture of incredibly inventive, engaging, and enthusiastic attitude and insanely disjointed instrumental quirkiness. When this score excels, it enthralls you, breaks your heart, and piques your intellectual interest. When it tries your patience, it's usually doing so as Pemberton tries to be too cute with one of his endless crescendos of pomposity or gets sidetracked by the darker passages. When you evaluate these two tendencies of the score together, however, the positives far outweigh the negatives. On album, the presentation may benefit from abandoning any attempt to program a chronological narrative organization and instead place the Enola theme's portions together in one group, the love theme and mother material in another, and the mystery theme's boisterous variants in one more. The score has outstanding cues throughout but needs some care when admiring its explosively wild ride outside of the film."

Film Music Central wrote "This soundtrack is, without a doubt, an incredible adventure to listen to". Mfiles wrote "You could describe the score as very much like the film's central character: relatable and a little bit eccentric. It has action, drama, mystery, adventure, and jeopardy but also some character development and emotion. It is full of good tunes and propulsive rhythms, with interesting and sometimes surprising instrumentation. While I wouldn't expect the score to be a serious oscar-contender, it is a hugely entertaining listen which further extends Pemberton's range." Marvelous Geeks Media writer Jenna Anne stated "Enola Holmes' original score, even without the context of the film is simply magical, adventurous, and so surprisingly comforting even amidst the more upbeat tracks."

== Track listing ==
No.	Title	Length
1.	"Enola Holmes (Wild Child)"	3:00
2.	"Gifts From Mother"	1:09
3.	"Mycroft & Sherlock Holmes"	1:02
4.	"Cracking The Chrysanthemums Cypher"	2:35
5.	"The Game Is Afoot"	1:53
6.	"Train Escape"	3:36
7.	"Nincompoop"	1:39
8.	"Marquis"	1:23
9.	"Fields Of London"	1:10
10.	"London Arrival"	2:31
11.	"Dressing Up Box"	1:18
12.	"Messages For Mother"	1:44
13.	"The Limehouse Puzzle"	2:15
14.	"Limehouse Lane"	2:41
15.	"Fight Combat"	3:22
16.	"Edge Of A Cliff"	1:41
17.	"Basilwether Hall"	1:38
18.	"Forest Clues"	2:50
19.	"Tewkesbury's Trail"	1:41
20.	"Escaping Lestrade"	1:55
21.	"Making A Lady"	3:16
22.	"School Escape"	2:55
23.	"Tick Tock"	3:49
24.	"For England"	3:34
25.	"Ha!"	1:18
26.	"Enola & Tewkesbury Farewell"	2:56
27.	"An Old Friend"	1:54
28.	"Mother"	2:02
29.	"Enola Holmes (The Future Is Up To Us)"	3:45
Total length:		66:32

== Personnel ==
Credits adapted from CD liner notes.

- Daniel Pemberton – composer, producer
- Gareth Griffiths – score contractor
- Ben Smithers – score editor
- Andrew Skeet – orchestrator, orchestra conductor
- Edward Farmer – additional orchestration
- Nathan Klein – additional orchestration
- Gianluca Massimo – assistant engineer
- Jack Mills – assistant engineer
- Jack Thomason – assistant engineer
- Chris Parker – pro-tools operator
- John Prestage – pro-tools operator
- Alex Wharton – mastering
- Sam OKell – recording, mixing
- Alison Litton – music supervision
- Peter Afterman – music supervision
- JC Chamboredon – executive producer
- Stefan Karrer – executive producer

== Chart performance ==
Chart (2020)	Peak position
UK Soundtrack Albums (OCC)	44
US Billboard 200	91
US Soundtrack Albums (Billboard)	14
