= Blood (2012 film) =

- Theatrical release poster
- Directed by: Nick Murphy
- Written by: Bill Gallagher
- Produced by: Pippa Harris; Nicola Shindler; Nick Laws
- Starring: Paul Bettany; Mark Strong; Stephen Graham; Brian Cox; Naomi Battrick; Ben Crompton; Natasha Little; Zoë Tapper
- Cinematography: George Richmond
- Edited by: Victoria Boydell
- Music by: Daniel Pemberton
- Production companies: BBC Films; IM Global; Neal Street Productions; Quickfire Films; Red Production Company
- Distributed by: Momentum Pictures
- Release dates: 11 October 2012 (London Film Festival); 31 May 2013 (United Kingdom)
- Running time: 92 minutes
- Country: United Kingdom
- Language: English

Blood is a 2012 thriller film directed by Nick Murphy and written by Bill Gallagher. The plot is about two brothers who are policemen and charts the moral collapse of a police family. The two brothers, played by Paul Bettany (Joe Fairburn) and Stephen Graham (Christie Fairburn) must investigate a despicable crime in a small town, in the shadow of their former police chief father.

The film is a cinematic remake of the 2004 BBC television mini series Conviction, which Gallagher also wrote.

== Plot ==
While trying to solve a vicious murder in a small town, two detectives Joe (Paul Bettany) and Chrissie (Stephen Graham) wind up murdering the suspected perpetrator. What follows brings them on a journey through fear and drives them to turn on each other. All whilst under the gaze of their police force colleague, Robert (Mark Strong). The investigation and ultimate crime turn their lives into a downward spiral of guilt and paranoia.

== Cast ==
- Paul Bettany as Joe Fairburn
- Mark Strong as Robert Seymour
- Stephen Graham as Chrissie Fairburn
- Brian Cox as Lanny Fairburn
- Naomi Battrick as Miriam Fairburn
- Ben Crompton as Jason Buleigh
- Natasha Little as Lily Fairburn
- Zoë Tapper as Jemma Vern
- Adrian Edmondson as Tom Tiernan
- Nick Murphy as Sports Master
- Patrick Hurd-Wood as Dominic
- Daniel Pemberton as Drunken Guitarist
- Stuart McQuarrie as David Saddler
- Sandra Voe as Sandra Buleigh
- Brooklyn Baker as CID Officer
- Jenna Sheehy as Running Girl 3
- Faye Morrison as Race Winner
