= Rising Phoenix =

2020 documentary film

- Film poster
- Directed by: Ian Bonhôte; Peter Ettedgui
- Produced by: John Battsek; Greg Nugent
- Starring: Jean-Baptiste Alaize; Ryley Batt; Ellie Cole; Philip Craven; Xavier Gonzalez; Eva Loeffler; Ntando Mahlangu; Tatyana McFadden; Andrew Parsons; Jonnie Peacock; Matt Stutzman; Prince Harry; Bebe Vio; Cui Zhe
- Music by: Daniel Pemberton
- Production companies: HTYT Films, Passion Pictures, Misfits Entertainment, Ventureland
- Distributed by: Netflix
- Release date: August 26, 2020 (Netflix)
- Running time: 105 minutes
- Country: United Kingdom
- Language: English

Rising Phoenix is a 2020 documentary film directed by Ian Bonhôte and Peter Ettedgui and starring Tatyana McFadden, Bebe Vio and Jonnie Peacock. The film conveys the stories of nine Paralympic athletes and their journeys in competition.

== Content ==
The documentary film tells the backstories of several Paralympic athletes. The film's title was inspired by Bebe Vio, who was nicknamed "Rising Phoenix" when she was young. Vio tells of how she loved fencing as a child, and had her arms and legs amputated after contracting meningitis at 11 years old. Jonnie Peacock similarly lost a leg to meningitis as a child. Other Paralympians featured include Jean-Baptiste Alaize, Matt Stutzman, Ntando Mahlangu, Tatyana McFadden, Cui Zhe, Ryley Batt, and Ellie Cole.

Also featured are Invictus Games founder Prince Harry, Duke of Sussex and Eva Loeffler, the daughter of Paralympic Games founder Ludwig Guttmann.

== Development ==
Greg Nugent, the marketing director for the 2012 Summer Paralympics, had wanted to make a documentary film about Paralympians for eight years before Rising Phoenix debuted. The directors of the film were Ian Bonhôte and Peter Ettedgui, who had previously made the 2018 documentary film McQueen. The film was intended to release to coincide with the 2020 Summer Paralympics in Tokyo, but those games were postponed due to the COVID-19 pandemic. Daniel Pemberton, the film's composer, recruited the disabled American hip-hop group Krip-Hop Nation to rap for the end-title song.

Rising Phoenix was released on August 26, 2020 on Netflix. It is an HTYT Films and Passion Pictures production in association with Ventureland and Misfits Entertainment.

== Reception ==
The film has received positive reviews from critics. It has a Rotten Tomatoes rating of 86% based on reviews from 21 critics. In a review, Celine Ramseyer of CNN said that the documentary "will make you laugh and cry". Daniel Pemberton, the composer of the film's soundtrack, won the World Soundtrack Award for Soundtrack Composer of the Year in 2021 for his work on the film.

The film won the award for Outstanding Long Sports Documentary at the Sports Emmy Awards in 2021. It was a nominee for Best Documentary at the British Independent Film Awards 2021.
