= Ferrari (2023 soundtrack) =

2023 soundtrack album by Daniel Pemberton

Ferrari (Original Motion Picture Soundtrack)

Soundtrack album by Daniel Pemberton
- Released: December 25, 2023
- Genres: Contemporary classical; film score
- Length: 53:24
- Label: Milan
- Producer: Daniel Pemberton

Daniel Pemberton chronology
Spider-Man: Across the Spider-Verse (Original Score) (2023)	Ferrari (Original Motion Picture Soundtrack) (2023)	Fly Me to the Moon (Original Motion Picture Soundtrack) (2024)

Ferrari (Original Motion Picture Soundtrack) is the soundtrack album composed by Daniel Pemberton for the 2023 film Ferrari by Michael Mann. It was digitally released by Milan Records on December 25, 2023, the same day as the film's theatrical release in the United States.

== Background ==
Composer Daniel Pemberton grew up watching the films of Michael Mann, whom he described as a "visionary director." Initially, Pemberton had only been brought onto the film to score the racing scenes, however, Mann liked Pemberton's work so much that he asked him to score the entire film.

== Composition ==
After reviewing the racing scenes, Pemberton wanted his score to complement the low rumbling frequency of the racecar engines. He stated that "the sound of those cars is the score in some ways, and the score must not tramp on that." As such, the score utilizes high-pitched strings and low-frequency bass that created space for the engines to become part of the score as well. For a major racing scene, Pemberton began with uneasy and "on-edge" chords that escalated into a crescendo until the driver onscreen reached a "driving nirvana, where you are suddenly in the zone and everything has come together."

Pemberton scored the film in one week, later describing the process as "very intense" and "like driving an actual Ferrari, at very high speeds." He described his Ferrari score as "slightly more understated" than what he usually composes.

== Reception ==
Justin Chang of the Los Angeles Times called Pemberton's score "moving" while Ross Bonaime of Collider called it "mesmerizing." Rafa Sales Ross of IGN wrote that Pemberton's score "[punctuated] the gritty sounds of thudding metal and roaring engines with heartrending melodies fittingly used as a reminder that Ferrari is a film about loss and longing in all their many forms." David Rooney of The Hollywood Reporter called Pemberton's score "propulsive or emotional as required" and wrote that it helped "keep the pace feeling brisk over a two-hours-plus running time." Edward Douglas of Above the Line wrote that Pemberton "[delivered] a score that's perfectly attuned to the period and region, making it very different from other scores, showing his continuing versatility." Ridge Harripersad of CGMagazine wrote, "The musical composition by Daniel Pemberton really set the tone for every scene well."

On the other hand, Hannah Strong of Little White Lies wrote that "Pemberton's score [felt] misused in places, pitched at such a level it competes with the dialogue."

== Accolades ==
Ferrari (Original Motion Picture Soundtrack) awards and nominations
Award	Year (Note: Indicates the year of ceremony. Each year is linked to the article about the awards held that year, wherever possible.)	Category	Result	Ref.
Society of Composers & Lyricists Awards	2024	Outstanding Original Score for an Independent Film	Nominated	

== Track listing ==
Ferrari (Original Motion Picture Soundtrack) track listing
No.	Title	Length
1.	"Dawn Over Emilia"	3:03
2.	"To Modena"	1:31
3.	"De Portago Test Drive"	1:53
4.	"Build a Wall"	1:13
5.	"Castelvetro"	3:11
6.	"French Grand Prix"	2:38
7.	"All Of Us Are Racers"	2:06
8.	"My Only Fear"	2:08
9.	"Fuel and Air"	2:41
10.	"Piero and Enzo"	4:03
11.	"Hills of Ravenna"	2:38
12.	"Letter Writing"	3:03
13.	"The Launch Ramp"	3:29
14.	"Bologna"	0:36
15.	"Rome Checkpoint, 1957 Mille Miglia"	4:22
16.	"The Racing Line"	1:56
17.	"Aftermath"	1:19
18.	"The Scapegoat"	3:28
19.	"Epilogue"	2:30
20.	"Enzo Ferrari"	5:26
Total length:		53:24

== Release history ==
Release history and formats for Ferrari (Original Motion Picture Soundtrack)
Region	Date	Format(s)	Label(s)	Ref.
Various	December 25, 2023	Digital download; streaming	Milan Records	
