= Complicit (film) =

2013 British television film directed by Niall MacCormick

- Written by: Guy Hibbert
- Directed by: Niall MacCormick
- Starring: David Oyelowo; Arsher Ali; Stephen Campbell Moore
- Theme music composer: Daniel Pemberton
- Country of origin: United Kingdom
- Original languages: English; Arabic

Production
- Producers: Jolyon Symonds and Kevin Toolis
- Cinematography: Jan Jonaeus
- Editor: Stuart Gazzard
- Running time: 93 minutes
- Production company: Many Rivers Films

Original release
- Network: Channel 4
- Release: 17 February 2013

Complicit is a 2013 British television film, produced by Many Rivers Films for Channel 4. It was directed by Niall MacCormick, written by Guy Hibbert, and produced by Jolyon Symonds and Kevin Toolis. David Oyelowo plays an MI5 officer who travels to Egypt to question a young man he believes is planning a terrorist attack using ricin.

== Plot ==
Edward Ekubo (David Oyelowo) is a case officer for the British Security Service, MI5. He is keeping Waleed Ahmed (Arsher Ali), a British citizen of Yemeni descent, under surveillance because he believes that Ahmed has been radicalised and is planning a terrorist attack in the UK. However, his supervisor and head of section are sceptical due to the lack of solid evidence. Ekubo feels his instincts are ignored and his career prospects stifled because he is black and studied at Warwick University rather than Oxford or Cambridge.

A hidden camera monitors Ahmed telling a colleague he is attending the wedding of his cousin in Yemen, but Ekubo's informants tell him that there is a long-standing feud between the cousins and he would not have been invited. Ekubo convinces his superiors and the Secret Intelligence Service (MI6) that Ahmed is a threat, and MI6 arrange for him to be followed in Yemen. Ahmed manages to elude them, and Ekubo suggests he may be heading to Cairo to meet with a contact who can assist with manufacturing ricin. Shortly afterwards, he hears that Ahmed has been arrested by Egyptian police along with several other men at a farm growing castor oil plants, the seeds of which can be used to make ricin.

Ekubo flies to Cairo where he meets the local MI6 officer, Tony Coveney (Stephen Campbell Moore). The men who were arrested with Ahmed admitted to helping manufacture ricin, but have withdrawn their confessions and have clearly been tortured. The British officers question Ahmed, who also claims to have been abused and mistreated, and under their guidelines, they must report his accusation to the British government. Frustrated with the slow progress, Ekubo asks a colleague to find out the name of the interrogating officer from Egypt's State Security Investigations Service—a Colonel Hazem Ashraf (Makram Khoury). The colonel offers to use his persuasive "techniques" to get the address in the UK where Ahmed may have sent the ricin two days ago. Ekubo also visits the farm and finds three aerosol cans missed by the police, which Coveney arranges to be sent to London for analysis.

Once again confounded by further delays in London, Ekubo questions Ahmed on his own. Ahmed claims he is innocent, and that the intercepted emails in which he and his contact refer to 'linen' (which Ekubo believes is code for ricin), are literally referring to bedsheets. He then hints that the ricin is already in the UK, and goads Ekubo about his colour until Ekubo throws Ahmed to the floor. Ekubo calls Colonel Hazem to ask for his help, and meets him at a coffeehouse the next day, where the colonel hands him an address in Derby. When Ekubo and Coveney return to the police station, Ekubo realises that the Colonel's claims to have used psychological techniques on Ahmed are false, as he has clearly been physically tortured. The address then turns out to be false, although one of the aerosol cans tests positive for ricin.

Ekubo returns to London, and is called into the office of the head of Section G. She tells him that his meeting at the coffeehouse with Hazem has been photographed by an activist blogger in Egypt who is investigating the colonel, and the story is about to go public. He is suspended with immediate effect, and it is suggested that he re-think his career. With his career in the service essentially over, Ekubo watches as Ahmed and his lawyer announce a lawsuit against the British government, and wonders if the ricin is out there in the UK.

== Production ==
The genesis of the film was an idea by producer Kevin Toolis, prompted by British Prime Minister Gordon Brown's denial that British intelligence were involved or complicit in conducting torture in other countries. He began to research the topic of torture, and in 2010, joined with screenwriter Guy Hibbert to continue research and draft a script.

The film was shot in May and June 2012 in London and Morocco (which doubled for the film's Egypt setting). Toolis was keen to film in Egypt itself, but acknowledged that the country's political turmoil in 2012, as well as the nature of the film's content regarding the conduct of Egyptian intelligence services, made filming there impractical or even dangerous.

Actor David Oyelowo had previously played an MI5 officer, Danny Hunter, in the BBC drama series Spooks. He told the Radio Times when he signed on for Complicit that he did not want to do a "film version of Spooks", and that he considered Complicit to be a far more realistic depiction of an intelligence officer's work than his previous role, which he described as "James Bond for the telly".

Actor Arsher Ali took a 'method acting' approach to his role and as a result, he did not speak to David Oyelowo between takes so as not to break character.

== Cast ==
- David Oyelowo – Edward Ekubo
- Arsher Ali – Waleed Ahmed
- Stephen Campbell Moore – Tony Coveney
- Rupert Procter – Ralph
- Monica Dolan – Judith
- Makram J. Khoury – Colonel Hazem Ashraf
- Paul Ritter – Thomas
- Denise Gough – Lucy

== Awards ==
Complicit won the BAFTA TV Award for Best Single Drama in 2014.

Arsher Ali also won the "Outstanding Actor" award at the Golden Nymph Awards in Monte Carlo for his performance.
