= Sunlightsquare =

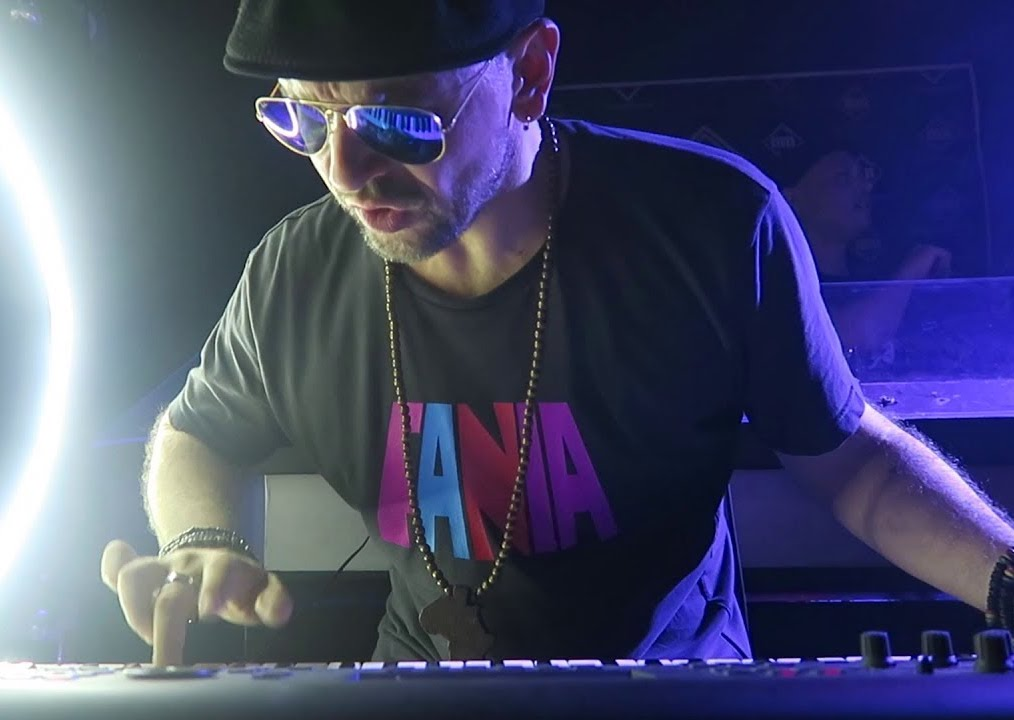
- Claudio Passavanti playing live at Le Monseigneur (Bordeaux)

Background information
- Origin: London
- Genres: Neo soul, nu jazz, boogaloo, salsa, house
- Years active: 2004–present
- Labels: Sunlightsquare, Yoruba, BBE Music
- Website: sunlightsquare.com

Sunlightsquare is the pseudonym of British Italian music producer, pianist and digital entrepreneur Claudio Passavanti also known as Doctor Mix on YouTube.

Primarily known for his work in Latin music, jazz fusion and house music, he performs live at festivals and clubs worldwide.

He has collaborated with international artists, most notably with American drummer Steve Gadd and bassist Will Lee.

As a YouTuber, he reviews synthesizers and explains synth-pop songs.

== Recent work ==
His 2008 cover of Stevie Wonder's "Pastime Paradise" was championed by Gilles Peterson, Joey Negro and Jazz FM DJ Peter Young, among others.

In 2009, Claudio Passavanti recorded a live album in Havana (Cuba) at Radio Rebelde's recording studios, released in February 2010 under the name 'Sunlightsquare Latin Combo'. Havana Central obtained critical acclaim; Blues & Soul magazine described it as "superb".

BBC magazine reviewed his 2011 album Britannia Shing-A-Ling as "a triumph".

== Discography ==
=== Albums ===
as Dr. Mix

- 80's Non-Stop Retro Nite, subtitle: Dr Mix's Most Requested Saturday Nite Retro Non-Stop Mix (SP-9903)

as Claudio Passavanti

- After Hours Ritual (1994)

as Eramo & Passavanti

- Oro e Ruggine (1998), winner of Mia Martini critic award with the track Senza confini

as Sunlightsquare

- Urban Sessions (2005)
- Mutations for Piano (2006)
- Urban Latin Soul (2008)
- Let's Groove (2009)
- Havana Central (2010)
- Britannia Shing-A-Ling (2011)
- King Yoruba (2014)

=== Singles ===
- "Pastime Paradise" (2008)
- "I Believe in Miracles" (2010)
- "Para Guarachar" (2010)
- "Super People" (2015)
- "Celebration of Oggun" (2016)
