= Joseph (fashion brand) =

UK fashion brand

JOSEPH
- Industry: Fashion
- Founded: 1966 in London, UK
- Area served: Worldwide
- Key people: Barbara Campos (CEO); Mario Arena (Creative Director)
- Products: Clothing, Accessories
- Website: www.joseph-fashion.com

Joseph is a luxury fashion brand and retail chain that was established in London by Moroccan entrepreneur Joseph Ettedgui and his family in 1972.

== History of the brand ==
The Joseph brand grew from a small shop attached to a hairdressing salon in King's Road, Chelsea, owned by Casablanca-born Joseph Ettedgui and his brothers Maurice and Franklin, to more than 20 London stores, with eight additional outlets in New York City and Paris plus stores in Leeds and Manchester.

Joseph Ettedgui's love of fashion meant the brothers began displaying designer clothes in their hair salon in the 1960s, including the work of pioneering Japanese designer Kenzo Takada. The success of this early collaboration led to a move into fashion retailing, with the first store opening below the Chelsea hair salon in the early 1970s and the first large-scale retail outlet opening on Sloane Street in 1979.

== Designer collaborations ==
Joseph stores championed the work of many up-and-coming designers, including Margaret Howell, Katharine Hamnett, John Galliano and Azzedine Alaïa. Own brand clothing began with distinctive knitwear (Joseph Tricot) and went on to include women's clothing, perfume, homewares (Joseph Pour La Maison), and Joe's restaurants. Joseph has been the recipient of a number of British Fashion Awards, including Knitwear Designer of the Year four times between 1990 and 1994 and a British Fashion Award in 2000 presented by Cherie Blair.

The stores were as distinctive and influential to the UK retail scene as the clothes in them. Joseph was among the first to combine a restaurant and shop in one space. The Sloane Street store originally incorporated Joe's Restaurant on site and the Brompton Cross store was accompanied by Joe's Restaurant across the road. The Sloane Street, Knightsbridge flagship store was opened in 1979, and was designed by acclaimed architect Norman Foster. Joseph also collaborated with other architects and designers – including Eva Jiricná, Andrée Putman and Raëd Abillama Architects – on its retail and restaurant projects.

== Further development of the brand ==
In 1999 the Ettedgui brothers sold a majority share of the business to Belgian financier Albert Frère, and a minority interest to LVMH.

In 2000, Frère took over the shares of Besoussan, who had briefly assumed the role of CEO at Joseph, and thus held 72% of the company. In the meantime, the Joseph boutiques ran alongside their own line, among other things. Designers like Alexander McQueen, Balenciaga, Azzedine Alaïa, John Galliano or Diane von Fürstenberg.

In 2004 there were 63 Joseph boutiques worldwide.

In May 2005 the company was sold to the Japanese fashion group Onward Kashiyama, long-time license partner of Joseph in Asia, for approximately 140 million pounds. Ettedgui and his brother Franklin received an additional £20 million in the deal for the sale of their remaining shares. The two left the company at the end of 2005. In 2008 sales were almost EUR 82 million.

Between 2009 and 2012 Joseph renovated a number of its stores both in the UK - including Brook Street, Old Bond Street, Sloane Street and Westbourne Grove - and in France, including St Germain and Avenue Montaigne.

In 2010 there were 34 boutiques worldwide.

In 2011 the company opened its first store in Moscow, and in 2012 opened a store in Los Angeles. In 2013 the company opened stores in Beirut and New York City.

In February 2016, Joseph opened its first stand-alone menswear store at No.2 Savile Row in London.

== Fashion shows ==
In 2013 Joseph announced that it would be appearing at London Fashion Week in February 2014, with five of its designers creating product for the catwalk show. It also appeared at London Fashion Week in autumn 2014.

The Autumn Winter 2015 Menswear Collection received press coverage from fashion trade paper WWD.

In 2026 Joseph returned to London Fashion Week, with a show at Tate Modern showcasing the Autumn Winter 2026 collection designed by current creative director, Mario Arena.
