= Daniel Pemberton =

English composer (born 1977)

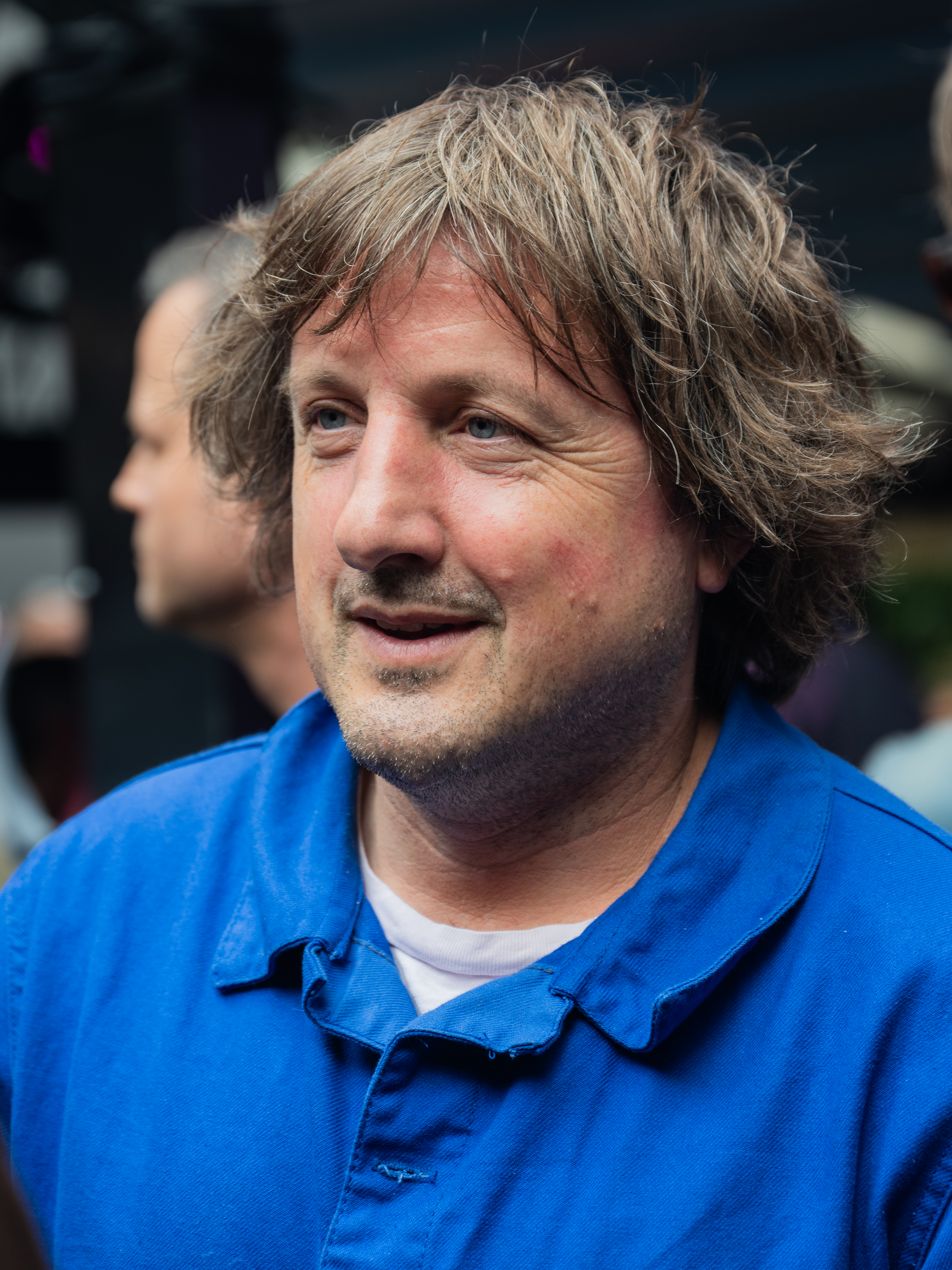
- Pemberton at SXSW London 2026

Background information
- Born: 3 November 1977 (age 49); United Kingdom
- Genres: Film score, video game score, electronic, ambient, rock, jazz, funk
- Occupations: Composer, songwriter
- Instruments: Piano, keyboards, synthesizer, guitar, bass guitar
- Website: danielpemberton.com

Daniel Pemberton (born 3 November 1977) is an English composer and songwriter. Primarily working in film, television, and video games, he has received various accolades including an Emmy Award as well as an Academy Award nomination, six BAFTA Awards and five Golden Globe Awards.

Pemberton has collaborated with filmmaker Aaron Sorkin thrice for Molly's Game (2017), The Trial of the Chicago 7 (2020), and Being the Ricardos (2021) and the middle of which earned him an Academy Award for Best Original Song nomination for "Hear My Voice". He has also composed the scores for the films The Counselor (2013), The Man from U.N.C.L.E. (2015), Steve Jobs (2015), Motherless Brooklyn (2019), Materialists (2025), The Drama (2026), and Project Hail Mary (2026). He is also known for Spider-Man: Into the Spider-Verse (2018), Spider-Man: Across the Spider-Verse (2023), and Spider-Man: Beyond the Spider-Verse (2027) as well as The Bad Guys film franchise (2022–present).

For television, he has composed the scores for the BBC / Netflix anthology series Black Mirror (2017–2025) and the Apple TV+ mystery crime series Slow Horses (2022–present), each has earned Primetime Emmy Award nominations, and the later received BAFTA TV Award nominations. For the Netflix documentary Rising Phoenix (2020), he won a Sports Emmy Award. For the National Geographic documentary The Rescue (2021) he won a Critics' Choice Documentary Award. He has also composed the video game scores for The Movies (2006) and LittleBigPlanet (2008).

== Early life ==
Pemberton grew up in East Molesey and attended Hampton School. At the age of 12, he completed work experience for the video game magazine Zero. Following the launch of Game Zone, at age 13 Pemberton ran PG Tips, the cheats and tips section for the magazine. He subsequently bought a keyboard and a tape player with his earnings.

== Career ==
=== 1994–2009 ===
In 1994, at the age of 16, Pemberton recorded his debut album, Bedroom, on a multitrack cassette recorder, which caught the attention of ambient musician Pete Namlook and was released on the latter's Fax label as part of its sub-label series. This album impressed TV director Paul Wilmshurst, who asked 17-year-old Pemberton to score a TV documentary on which he was working. Following this, he became a very in-demand composer for British television eventually segueing into feature film with his debut score of The Awakening from director Nick Murphy.

Pemberton has composed title tunes and incidental music for several television series including The Game, Prey, Ambassadors, Peep Show, Desperate Romantics, Space Dive, Occupation, Prisoners' Wives, Black Mirror, My Mad Fat Diary, Suburban Shootout, Hell's Kitchen, Great British Menu, Hiroshima, Bad Lads' Army, That'll Teach 'Em, George Orwell: A Life in Pictures, The Yellow House, Monster Moves, Dirk Gently, Napoleon and the first series of the 2010 revival of Upstairs Downstairs. He has composed music for video games such as LittleBigPlanet, Kinect Adventures, LittleBigPlanet 2, The Movies and TrackMania Turbo. Using the alias The Daniel Pemberton TV Orchestra, some of his television themes were released on the album TVPOPMUZIK in 2007, while his video game work—primarily that from LittleBigPlanet—was released on the album LittleBIGMusic.

=== 2010–2019 ===
In 2013, Pemberton completed his breakthrough score of director Ridley Scott's film The Counselor, which was recorded at Abbey Road Studios in London. Pemberton was originally named the "Discovery of the Year" in 2014 at the World Soundtrack Awards and nominated as "Film Composer of the Year" in 2016, 2019, 2021, 2022 and 2023.

In 2016 his score for Steve Jobs was nominated for the Golden Globe Award for Best Original Score. In 2017 he was nominated for the Golden Globe Award for Best Original Song for the song Gold from the film of the same name which he co-wrote with Iggy Pop, Danger Mouse and the director Stephen Gaghan. In 2019 his score for Motherless Brooklyn was nominated for the Golden Globe Award for Best Original Score. He won an Emmy for his work on the acclaimed Paralympic documentary Rising Phoenix creating a score and song working alongside numerous musicians and artists with disabilities.

Earlier work includes The Awakening (2011); the live-action short Ghost Recon: Alpha (2012), directed by Francois Alaux and Herve De Crecy and edited by Pietro Scalia; Blood (2012); and In Fear and the television film Complicit (both 2013). Pemberton also scored director Gareth Edwards' breakthrough sci-fi short film Factory Farmed. Pemberton's other notable works include the Ridley Scott-directed The Counselor (2013) and All the Money in the World (2017); the Danny Boyle-directed Steve Jobs (2015) and Yesterday (2019); the Guy Ritchie-directed The Man from U.N.C.L.E. (2015) and King Arthur: Legend of the Sword (2017); the Aaron Sorkin-directed Molly's Game (2017), The Trial of the Chicago 7 (2020), and Being the Ricardos (2021); Cuban Fury (2014); the French film Mal De Pierres (2016); the score to the American 2018 animated film Spider-Man: Into the Spider-Verse, as well as the score to its 2023 sequel Spider-Man: Across the Spider-Verse; Ocean's 8 (2018); Enola Holmes (2020); and The Rescue (2021), for which Pemberton won a Critics' Choice Award for Best Score.

=== 2020–present ===
For the 2020 Paralympics documentary film Rising Phoenix as well as working with disabled musicians on the score Pemberton collaborated with disabled rappers Toni Hickman, Georgetragic and Keith Jones to create the end credits song "Rising Phoenix". which was used in the closing ceremonies of both the 2020 Olympic and Paralympic Games. Pemberton has co-written songs such as "Jokes on You", the title track performed by Charlotte Lawrence from the film Birds of Prey; "Good Tonight" performed by Anthony Ramos and "Brand New Day" performed by the Heavy from the animated DreamWorks feature film The Bad Guys; and the title theme "Come With Me" performed by Yola from the second Netflix series of Green Eggs And Ham. He co-wrote and produced the end titles song "Time" from the movie Amsterdam with Drake and performed by Giveon which was shortlisted for the 2023 Oscars.

In 2021, he was named "Film Composer of the Year" by the World Soundtrack Awards and International Film Music Critics Association. Pemberton has been nominated for an Academy Award, won an Emmy Award and been nominated four times for a Golden Globe award and three times for a BAFTA Award. In 2021 he was nominated for the Academy Award For Best Original Song and Golden Globe Award for Best Original Song for the song "Hear My Voice" from the film The Trial of the Chicago 7 which was performed and co-written with Celeste. Pemberton and Celeste performed the song during the 2021 Oscars Ceremony from the roof of the newly opened Academy Museum in Hollywood. A new arrangement of the song was also used as a central part of the Opening Ceremony of the 2022 Commonwealth Games featuring a 1,000-piece choir and guitar solos from Black Sabbath founder Tony Iommi.

In 2022 Pemberton co-wrote and produced the title song "Strange Game" with Mick Jagger for the Apple TV series Slow Horses. On July 26, 2025 during the San Diego Comic-Con Project Hail Mary directors Phil Lord and Christopher Miller announced Daniel Pemberton as the music composer and producer. However a later interview with Soundsphere Magazine revealed that he had been contracted to compose the film's soundtrack in 2024.

== Filmography ==
=== Feature film ===
| Year | Title | Director(s) | Notes | Ref. |
|---|---|---|---|---|
| 2009 | Enemies of the People | Rob Lemkin and Thet Sambath | Documentary | |
| 2011 | The Awakening | Nick Murphy | | |
| 2012 | Blood | Nick Murphy | | |
| 2013 | In Fear | Jeremy Lovering | | |
| 2013 | The Counselor | Ridley Scott | | |
| 2014 | Cuban Fury | James Griffiths | | |
| 2015 | The Man from U.N.C.L.E. | Guy Ritchie | | |
| 2015 | Steve Jobs | Danny Boyle | | |
| 2016 | From the Land of the Moon | Nicole Garcia | | |
| 2016 | Gold | Stephen Gaghan | | |
| 2017 | King Arthur: Legend of the Sword | Guy Ritchie | | |
| 2017 | Mark Felt: The Man Who Brought Down the White House | Peter Landesman | | |
| 2017 | Molly's Game | Aaron Sorkin | | |
| 2017 | All the Money in the World | Ridley Scott | | |
| 2018 | Ocean's 8 | Gary Ross | Replaced Nicholas Britell | |
| 2018 | Scarborough | Barnaby Southcombe | | |
| 2018 | Spider-Man: Into the Spider-Verse | Bob Persichetti, Peter Ramsey and Rodney Rothman | | |
| 2019 | Yesterday | Danny Boyle | | |
| 2019 | Motherless Brooklyn | Edward Norton | | |
| 2020 | Birds of Prey | Cathy Yan | | |
| 2020 | Enola Holmes | Harry Bradbeer | | |
| 2020 | The Trial of the Chicago 7 | Aaron Sorkin | | |
| 2020 | Rising Phoenix | Ian Bonhote and Peter Ettedgui | Documentary | |
| 2021 | The Rescue | Elizabeth Chai Vasarhelyi and Jimmy Chin | Documentary | |
| 2021 | Being the Ricardos | Aaron Sorkin | | |
| 2022 | The Bad Guys | Pierre Perifel | | |
| 2022 | Brian and Charles | Jim Archer | | |
| 2022 | See How They Run | Tom George | | |
| 2022 | Amsterdam | David O. Russell | Replaced Hildur Guðnadóttir | |
| 2022 | Enola Holmes 2 | Harry Bradbeer | Cameo appearance as orchestra conductor | |
| 2023 | Spider-Man: Across the Spider-Verse | Joaquim Dos Santos, Kemp Powers and Justin K. Thompson | | |
| 2023 | Ferrari | Michael Mann | | |
| 2024 | Fly Me to the Moon | Greg Berlanti | | |
| 2025 | Materialists | Celine Song | | |
| 2025 | Eddington | Ari Aster | co-composed with Bobby Krlic | |
| 2025 | The Bad Guys 2 | Pierre Perifel | | |
| 2026 | Project Hail Mary | Phil Lord and Christopher Miller | | |
| 2026 | The Drama | Kristoffer Borgli | | |
| 2026 | Masters of the Universe | Travis Knight | | |
| 2027 | Spider-Man: Beyond the Spider-Verse † | Bob Persichetti and Justin K. Thompson | | |

Key
| † | Denotes films that have not yet been released |

=== Short film ===
| Year | Title | Director |
|---|---|---|
| 2008 | Factory Farmed | Gareth Edwards |
| 2012 | Ghost Recon: Alpha | Francois Alaux; Herve de Crecy |

=== Television ===
| Year | Title | Notes |
|---|---|---|
| 2002–2006 | Bad Lads' Army | Broadcast on ITV |
| 2003–2006 | That'll Teach 'Em | Broadcast on Channel 4 |
| 2003–2015 | Peep Show | Broadcast on Channel 4 |
| 2004–2009 | Hell's Kitchen | Broadcast on ITV |
| 2006 | Great British Menu | Theme music for season 1, broadcast on BBC Two |
| 2006 | Prehistoric Park | Broadcast on ITV |
| 2009 | Commanders at War | Broadcast on the Military Channel |
| 2009 | The Lost World of Communism | Episode: "The Kingdom of Forgetting" |
| 2009 | Runaway | Serial, broadcast on CBBC |
| 2009 | Best: His Mother's Son | TV movie, broadcast on BBC Two and BBC Northern Ireland |
| 2009 | Occupation | Serial, broadcast on BBC One |
| 2009 | Desperate Romantics | Broadcast on BBC Two |
| 2009 | Wildest Dreams | 2 episodes, broadcast on BBC One |
| 2010–2012 | Dirk Gently | Broadcast on BBC 4 |
| 2010 | Upstairs Downstairs | Series 1, broadcast on BBC One |
| 2012 | Public Enemies | Broadcast on BBC One |
| 2012–2013 | Prisoners' Wives | Broadcast on BBC One |
| 2012 | Pramface | Episode: "Like Narnia But Sexy" |
| 2013 | Complicit | TV movie, broadcast on Channel 4 |
| 2013 | Ambassadors | Serial, broadcast on BBC Two |
| 2014–2015 | Prey | Broadcast on ITV |
| 2014 | The Game | Serial, broadcast on BBC Two |
| 2017; 2025 | Black Mirror | Episodes: "USS Callister", "Bête Noire", "USS Callister: Into Infinity" |
| 2018 | One Strange Rock | Miniseries, broadcast on National Geographic |
| 2019 | Brexit: The Uncivil War | TV movie, broadcast on Channel 4 and HBO |
| 2019 | The Dark Crystal: Age of Resistance | Netflix miniseries, co-composer with Samuel Sim; Original Dark Crystal theme by Trevor Jones |
| 2021 | Welcome to Earth | Disney+ series |
| 2022–2023 | The Afterparty | Apple TV+ series, co-composer with David Schweitzer for season 2 |
| 2022– | Slow Horses | Apple TV+ series, co-composer with Toydrum |
| 2022 | Green Eggs and Ham | Netflix series, season 2 theme with Gary Go; Performed by Yola; Score composed by David Newman |

=== Video games ===
| Year | Title | Developer(s) |
|---|---|---|
| 2005 | The Movies | Lionhead Studios |
| 2008 | LittleBigPlanet | Media Molecule |
| 2010 | Kinect Adventures! | Microsoft Game Studios |
| 2011 | LittleBigPlanet 2 | Media Molecule |
| 2019 | Knights and Bikes | Foam Sword; Double Fine Productions |
| 2024 | Concord | Firewalk Studios |

== Discography ==
- Bedroom (Fax +49-69/450464, 1994)
- Octopus 3 [with Charles Uzzell-Edwards] (Fax +49-69/450464, 1998)
- Enhanced Environments [with Charles Uzzell-Edwards] (Subversal Records, 1999)

=== Soundtrack releases ===
• Musk (Vol.1) (Milan Records, 2026)

- Project Hail Mary (Milan Records, 2026)
- The Bad Guys 2 (Back Lot Music, 2025)
- Ferrari (Milan Records, 2023)
- The Afterparty: Season 2 (Madison Gate Records, 2023)
- Spider-Man: Across the Spider-Verse (Sony Classical, 2023)
- Slow Horses: Season 2 (Apple Video Programming, 2023)
- Enola Holmes 2 (Milan Records, 2022)
- Amsterdam (Hollywood Records, 2022)
- See How They Run (Hollywood Records, 2022)
- Brian and Charles (1812 Recordings, 2022)
- The Bad Guys (Back Lot Music, 2022)
- The Afterparty: Season 1 (Madison Gate Records, 2022)
- Welcome to Earth (National Geographic Partners, 2021)
- Being the Ricardos (Lakeshore Records, 2021)
- The Rescue (National Geographic Partners, 2021)
- The Trial of the Chicago 7 (Varèse Sarabande, 2020)
- Enola Holmes (Milan Records, 2020)
- Rising Phoenix (1812 Recordings, 2020)
- Birds of Prey (WaterTower Music, 2020)
- Motherless Brooklyn (WaterTower Music, 2019)
- The Dark Crystal: Age of Resistance, Vol. 1 (Cutting Edge Music, 2019)
- The Dark Crystal: Age of Resistance, Vol. 2 (Cutting Edge Music, 2019)
- Spider-Man: Into the Spider-Verse (Sony Classical, 2018)
- Ocean's 8 (WaterTower Music, 2018)
- Molly's Game (Sony Classical, 2018)
- Black Mirror: USS Callister (1812 Recordings, 2017)
- All The Money in the World (Sony Classical, 2017)
- Mark Felt: The Man Who Brought Down The White House (Filmtrax Ltd., 2017)
- King Arthur: Legend of the Sword (WaterTower Music, 2017)
- Gold (BMG, 2017)
- From The Land Of The Moon (Mal De Pierres) (Les Productions Du Tresor, 2017)
- Steve Jobs (Back Lot Music, 2015)
- The Man From U.N.C.L.E. (Watertower, 2015)
- The Game (MovieScore Media, 2015)
- Cuban Fury (Decca Records, 2014)
- The Counselor (Milan Records, 2013)
- Blood (MovieScore Media, 2013)
- Space Dive (1812 Recordings, 2012)
- Dirk Gently (Moviescore Media, 2012)
- The Awakening (Moviescore Media/Screamworks, 2012)
- Desperate Romantics (1812 Recordings, 2012)
- LittleBIGMusic (1812 Recordings, 2011)
- The Haunted Airman (1812 Recordings, 2011)
- Upstairs Downstairs (1812 Recordings, 2010)
- Kinect Adventures (1812 Recordings, 2010)
- Monster Moves: Songs + Sounds (1812 Recordings, 2009)
- Heroes and Villains: Attila the Hun / Napoleon (Moviescore Media, 2009)
- TVPOPMUZIK (1812 Recordings, 2007)
- Prehistoric Park (1812 Recordings, 2006)

== Awards and nominations ==
| Organizations | Year | Category | Work | Result | Ref. |
|---|---|---|---|---|---|
| Academy Awards | 2020 | Best Original Song | "Hear My Voice" (from The Trial of the Chicago 7) | Nominated | |
| Annie Awards | 2023 | Outstanding Achievement for Music in a Feature Production | The Bad Guys | Nominated | |
| Annie Awards | 2024 | Outstanding Achievement for Music in a Feature Production | Spider-Man: Across the Spider-Verse | Won | |
| BAFTA Film Awards | 2021 | Best Original Music | Being the Ricardos | Nominated | |
| BAFTA Film Awards | 2023 | Best Original Music | Spider-Man: Across the Spider-Verse | Nominated | |
| BAFTA Games Awards | 2006 | Best Original Score | The Movies | Nominated | |
| BAFTA Games Awards | 2009 | Best Original Score | LittleBigPlanet | Nominated | |
| BAFTA TV Awards | 2023 | Best Original Music: Fiction | Slow Horses | Nominated | |
| BAFTA TV Awards | 2025 | Best Original Music: Fiction | Slow Horses | Nominated | |
| Critics' Choice Awards | 2024 | Best Score | Spider-Man: Across the Spider-Verse | Nominated | |
| Critics' Choice Documentary Awards | 2020 | Best Score | Rising Phoenix | Nominated | |
| Critics' Choice Documentary Awards | 2021 | Best Score | The Rescue | Won | |
| D.I.C.E. Awards | 2012 | Outstanding Achievement in Original Music Composition | LittleBigPlanet 2 | Nominated | |
| Emmy Awards (Primetime) | 2018 | Outstanding Music Composition for a Limited Series, Movie or Special | Black Mirror (for "USS Callister") | Nominated | |
| Emmy Awards (Primetime) | 2024 | Outstanding Music Composition for a Series | Slow Horses (for "Strange Games") | Nominated | |
| Emmy Awards (Primetime) | 2025 | Outstanding Music Composition for a Limited Series, Movie or Special | Black Mirror (for "USS Callister: Into Infinity") | Nominated | |
| Emmy Awards (Primetime) | 2026 | Outstanding Music Composition for a Series | Slow Horses (for "Missiles") | Nominated | |
| Emmy Awards (Primetime) | 2026 | Outstanding Original Music and Lyrics | "The Devil You Know" (from Spider-Noir) | Nominated | |
| Emmy Awards (Sports) | 2021 | Outstanding Music Direction | Rising Phoenix | Won | |
| Golden Globes | 2015 | Best Original Score | Steve Jobs | Nominated | |
| Golden Globes | 2016 | Best Original Song | "Gold" (from Gold) | Nominated | |
| Golden Globes | 2019 | Best Original Score | Motherless Brooklyn | Nominated | |
| Golden Globes | 2020 | Best Original Song | "Hear My Voice" (from The Trial of the Chicago 7) | Nominated | |
| Golden Globes | 2023 | Best Original Score | Spider-Man: Across the Spider-Verse | Nominated | |
| Grammy Awards | 2027 | Best Score Soundtrack Album for Visual Media | Project Hail Mary | Pending | |
| Middleburg Film Festival | 2026 | Distinguished Composer Award | Ink / Project Hail Mary | Honored | |
| International Documentary Association | 2021 | Best Music Score | Rising Phoenix | Nominated | |
| RTS Craft & Design Awards | 2009 | Best Music, Original Score | Occupation | Nominated | |
| RTS Craft & Design Awards | 2009 | Best Music, Original Titles | Desperate Romantics | Nominated | |
| RTS Craft & Design Awards | 2022 | Best Music, Original Titles | Slow Horses | Nominated | |
| Satellite Awards | 2021 | Best Original Song | "Hear My Voice" (from The Trial of the Chicago 7) | Nominated | |
| Satellite Awards | 2024 | Best Original Score | Spider-Man: Across the Spider-Verse | Nominated | |
| Saturn Awards | 2024 | Best Music in a Film | Spider-Man: Across the Spider-Verse | Nominated | |
| World Soundtrack Awards | 2014 | Discovery of the Year | Cuban Fury / The Counselor | Won | |
| World Soundtrack Awards | 2016 | Public Choice Award | The Man from U.N.C.L.E. | Nominated | |
| World Soundtrack Awards | 2016 | Film Composer of the Year | From the Land of the Moon / Steve Jobs; The Man from U.N.C.L.E. | Nominated | |
| World Soundtrack Awards | 2019 | Film Composer of the Year | Scarborough /Yesterday; Spider-Man: Into the Spider-Verse | Nominated | |
| World Soundtrack Awards | 2021 | Film Composer of the Year | Enola Holmes / Rising Phoenix; The Trial of the Chicago 7 | Won | |
| World Soundtrack Awards | 2022 | Film Composer of the Year | The Bad Guys / Being the Ricardos; Brian and Charles / The Rescue | Nominated | |
| World Soundtrack Awards | 2023 | Film Composer of the Year | Amsterdam / Enola Holmes 2 See How They Run; Spider-Man: Across the Spider-Verse | Nominated | |
| World Soundtrack Awards | 2026 | Film Composer of the Year | Project Hail Mary / The Bad Guys 2 The Drama / Masters of the Universe | Won | |
