= McQueen (film) =

2018 biographical documentary film

- Film poster
- Directed by: Ian Bonhôte
- Written by: Peter Ettedgui
- Produced by: Ian Bonhôte; Andee Ryder; Nick Taussig; Paul Van Carter
- Starring: Alexander McQueen
- Cinematography: Will Pugh
- Edited by: Cinzia Baldessari
- Music by: Michael Nyman
- Distributed by: Lionsgate
- Release date: 22 April 2018 (Tribeca Film Festival)
- Country: United Kingdom
- Language: English

McQueen is a 2018 biographical documentary film, directed by Ian Bonhôte, written and co-directed by Peter Ettedgui, and produced by Ian Bonhôte, Andee Ryder, Nick Taussig, and Paul Van Carter under the banner of Misfits Entertainment, and Salon Pictures. The documentary is based on the life and career of British fashion designer Alexander McQueen.

== Cast ==
Credits adapted from Rotten Tomatoes.

- Alexander McQueen
- Tom Ford
- Isabella Blow
- Kate Moss
- Annabelle Neilson
- Janet McQueen

== Production ==
Film director Ian Bonhôte, and producer Peter Ettedgui approached Alexander McQueen's family to make a documentary film about McQueen; the family declined the request. In February 2017 Bonhôte, and Ettedgui proposed their idea to several film distributors. The film was financed within three days, and director Ian Bonhôte added, "We wanted to make a really respectful cinematic version of Lee’s story".

The production team took the project, with "zero access and zero original archive at our fingertips", and worked 18-20 hour days for a year to finish the project.

== Reception ==
=== Box office ===
McQueen grossed $868,544 in the United Kingdom, and grossed $205,045 in Australia, for a total worldwide gross of $2,638,552. On its domestic opening weekend the film grossed $98,873, averaging $24,718 per location. On its second weekend McQueen grossed $83,461, with change of -16%, and averaging $16,692 per location. On its third weekend the film grossed $181,638, which became its highest opening weekend, with +118% change, and averaging $5,342 per 34 theaters.

=== Critical response ===
On the review aggregator Rotten Tomatoes, the film holds an approval rating of 99% based on 126 reviews, with an average rating of 7.8/10. The website's critical consensus reads, "McQueen offers an intimate, well-sourced, and overall moving look at a young life and brilliant career that were tragically cut short." Metacritic, which uses a weighted average, assigned the film a score of 84 out of 100, based on 28 critics, indicating "Universal acclaim".

Peter Travers of the Rolling Stone wrote, "McQueen is an empathetic, ravishing and scorchingly outspoken look at why, eight years after his death, he still leaves us transfixed". Michael O'Sullivan of The Washington Post wrote, "McQueen” makes the case that its subject was an artist whose clay was clothing. It also, despite giving short shrift to psychoanalysis, reminds us that everything you might want to know about the artist can be found in the art". Kenneth Turan of the Los Angeles Times wrote, "If you live and die for fashion, a documentary called “McQueen” could tell only one story, that of designer Alexander McQueen, whose extraordinary gifts, dark preoccupations and tragic death make for a completely engrossing, compulsively watchable film".

=== Accolades ===
Year	Award	Category	Result	Refs.
2018	Tribeca Film Festival	Best Documentary	Nominated	
2018	Transatlantyk Festival	Best Documentary	Nominated	
2018	Hot Docs Canadian International Documentary Festival	Best Social Political Documentary	Nominated	
2018	Hamburg Film Festival	Best Feature	Nominated	
2019	GALECA: The Society of LGBTQ Entertainment Critics	LGBTQ Documentary of the Year	Won	
2019	Motion Picture Sound Editors	Golden Reel Award	Nominated	
2019	London Critics Circle Film Awards	Documentary of the Year	Nominated	
2019	International Film Music Critics Award (IFMCA)	Best Original Score for a Documentary Film (IFMCA Award)	Nominated	
2019	British Academy Film Awards	Outstanding British Film of the Year	Nominated	
2019	British Academy Film Awards	Best Documentary	Nominated	
