= Cuban Fury =

- UK theatrical release poster
- Directed by: James Griffiths
- Written by: Jon Brown
- Produced by: James Biddle; Nira Park
- Starring: Nick Frost; Rashida Jones; Chris O'Dowd; Ian McShane
- Cinematography: Dick Pope
- Edited by: Jonathan Amos
- Music by: Daniel Pemberton
- Production companies: Big Talk Productions; British Film Institute; Film4
- Distributed by: StudioCanal
- Release date: 14 February 2014
- Running time: 98 minutes
- Country: United Kingdom
- Languages: English; Persian; Spanish
- Budget: £1 million
- Box office: $5.6 million

Cuban Fury is a 2014 British romantic comedy film directed by James Griffiths, written by Jon Brown, and starring Nick Frost, Rashida Jones, and Chris O'Dowd. The film was a minor box office success but received mixed reviews from critics.

== Plot ==
Bruce Garrett, a former teen salsa champion with his sister Sam, is now an engineer. Bruce gave up dancing after he was brutally bullied and traumatised by older boys on his way to the National finals.

25 years later, after Bruce has a meet-cute moment with his new American boss, Julia, he hears she is passionate about salsa dancing. So, he decides that the only way he can win her over is by re-mastering the art of dance. He seeks out his old teacher Ron, who forces him to confront the reasons he quit dancing in the first place.

Bruce struggles with low self-esteem due to his weight, as well as his constantly bullying coworker and rival, Drew. He continually dominates Julia's attention, a romantic interest for Bruce but strictly sexual for Drew. With the help of his salsa classmates, teacher, and his former dancing partner, his sister Sam, Bruce gets up the courage to relearn all his 'rusty' dance steps and to recapture his lost "corazón" (heart), not only for the dance but for his life.

Drew organises a bowling night involving Julia, Bruce and Carly. Bruce is not impressive, but he has created a Salsa mixtape, with his own inlay, which he surreptitiously plants in Julie's bag. Convinced by his classmate Bejan to go to a salsa club, Bruce is given a mini makeover at home. The transformation includes shaving his chest hair and use a bronzer. At the club, there are more people from the class. As Bruce is dancing with his instructor, Ron openly criticizes his passionless move. Incensed by the bullying, he greatly improves, but when seeing Drew with Julia on the dance floor, he is dejected. His salsa friends see the deflated Bruce leaving.

The next day at work, Drew reveals to Bruce that he recovered the mixtape. Drew then gifts it to Julia, having replaced the inlay. Thanks to Ron seeing Bruce at the club, he agrees to train Bruce. Again encouraging him with mild bullying, Ron pushes him hard until he starts to see results. Bruce has a mini dance-off with Drew at their lunch break, giving him a burst of self-confidence.

When ready, Bruce's friends convince him to enter the local nightclub's salsa dance competition, with the idea that he'll invite Julia to be his dance partner. But when he goes round to hers to ask her out to the dance, he is tricked into believing that he's interrupting an intimate evening she's spending with Drew, so leaves before asking, disillusioned.

Julia, meanwhile, discovers what Drew is up to and outright rejects his advances, then kicks him out whilst threatening his position at work. Julia discovers the salsa mixtape was from Bruce, not Drew, so she follows him to the nightclub where he's been doing quite well with Sam and an old routine, and is about to enter the final heat/round of the competition.

When he notices Julia had followed him to the club, he's elated and finally plucks up the courage to ask her to dance. They dance the last round of the competition, where Bruce goes on to lose the competition, but regains his true self and finally wins Julia's heart.

== Cast ==
- Nick Frost as Bruce Garrett
- Rashida Jones as Julia
- Chris O'Dowd as Drew
- Ian McShane as Ron
- Olivia Colman as Sam Garrett
- Wendi McLendon-Covey as Carly
- Alexandra Roach as Helen
- Rory Kinnear as Gary
- Kayvan Novak as Bejan
- Ben Radcliffe as Young Bruce Garrett
- Simon Pegg (cameo) as Ginger Mondeo driver
- Chris Wilson as Chief Executive Officer
- The Cuban Brothers as MC's during dance contest

== Release ==
=== Critical response ===
The film received mixed reviews from critics. On review aggregator website Rotten Tomatoes, it has a 54% score based on 96 reviews, with an average rating of 5.54/10. The site's consensus states: "Nick Frost and Chris O'Dowd remain as undeniably likable as ever, but Cuban Fury saddles them with a contrived and predictable plot that's far too short on laughs." Olivia Colman, who appeared in a supporting role as Frost’s sharp-tongued sister, later drew brief media attention after remarking in interviews that she could not remember details of the film or her performance in it. Colman explained that she frequently forgets projects once filming has finished, particularly when she has worked on numerous productions in quick succession. Her comments led to some online discussion, with a small number of critics interpreting them as dismissive of the film; however, most coverage framed the remarks as humorous and consistent with her well-known self-deprecating manner. Metacritic gives a weighted average score of 52 out of 100 rating based on reviews from 21 critics, indicating "mixed or average reviews".

== Soundtrack ==
Decca Records released the Cuban Fury soundtrack on 17 February 2014.

Track listing
No.	Title	Artists	Length
1.	"Mambo Gozon"	Tito Puente And His Orchestra	2:48
2.	"I Believe In Miracles"	Sunlightsquare	3:55
3.	"Amor Internacional"	Doble Filo	4:17
4.	"Lupita"	Nico Gomez, His Afro Percussion	3:42
5.	"Aguanile"	Marc Anthony	5:16
6.	"Get It Together"	Daniel Pemberton	3:23
7.	"Arroz Con Pollo"	Ogguere, Gilles Peterson's Havana Cultura Band	4:44
8.	"Finding The Fury"	Daniel Pemberton	2:32
9.	"Machito Forever"	Tito Puente	4:51
10.	"Abre Que Voy"	Miguel Enriquez	5:04
11.	"Descarga"	Gerardo Frisina	5:00
12.	"Breakin' Down (Sugar Samba)"	Sunlightsquare	3:21
13.	"Bonito y Sabroso"	Oscar D'León	3:43
14.	"Que Cosa Tiene La Vida"	Juan Formell, Los Van Van	6:41
15.	"La Banda"	Spanish Harlem Orchestra	4:49
