= Ixsir =

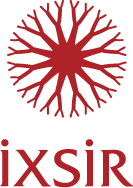
Ixir logo

IXSIR Winery, established in 2008, is a Lebanese wine producer located just outside Batroun, north Lebanon. The company is known for its high-altitude vineyards, ranging from 1,300 to 5,900 feet. The name is derived from the Arabic word for "elixir" (Al-Ikseer).

IXSIR produces a range of wines, including blends of local and international grape varieties, and exports to 35 countries and 22 U.S. states. Jean-Marc Quarin awarded it "best grade for a Lebanese wine" at Bordeaux's La Semaine des Primeurs 09.

The winery has also earned three international architectural awards for environmental initiatives.

== History ==
IXSIR was founded in 2008 by Etienne Debbane, Hady Kahale, Carlos Ghosn and Gabriel Rivero. IXSIR entered the Lebanese market in 2010, and quickly became the fastest growing wine on the Lebanese and the export markets.

On May 11, 2010, IXSIR joined the Union Vinicole du Liban (UVL).

As of 2020, IXSIR exported its wines to 35 countries and 22 states within the United States. The winery initially focused on restaurants serving Lebanese cuisine but has since expanded its reach through online sales, particularly in response to the COVID-19 pandemic.

== Vineyards ==
The only Middle Eastern country without a desert, Lebanon's topography is favorable for wine production as it consists of mountains, valleys, and coastal areas that are hospitable to many different grape varieties. Ixsir cultivates its wine grapes in different zones, including Batroun in the North, Jezzine in the South, and the Bekaa Valley in the East.

As of 2020, IXSIR managed 297 acres (120 hectares) of productive vineyards, with an additional 75 acres (30 hectares) set to come online within three years. The winery's vineyards are spread across several regions, including:

- Jezzine: Located at 3,100 feet (950 meters) elevation.
- Ainata: Situated at 5,900 feet (1,800 meters) elevation.
- Halwa: At 4,600 feet (1,400 meters) elevation.

== Products ==
Ixsir produces a spectrum of grape varieties, from Cabernet Sauvignon, Syrah, Tempranillo, Caladoc, and Viognier, Muscat, Sauvignon blanc, Chardonnay and Sémillon.

=== Available ranges ===
- Red, 2008. Grape varieties: Cabernet Sauvignon, Syrah, Caladoc and Tempranillo
- Rosé, 2009. Grape varieties: Syrah and Caladoc
- White, 2009, Grape varieties: Muscat, Viognier, Sauvignon and Sémillo
- Red, 2008. 61% Syrah and 39% Cabernet Sauvignon, French oak barrels
- White 2009. 60% Viognier, 25% Sauvignon and 15% Chardonnay
