= The Awakening (2011 film) =

- Theatrical release poster
- Directed by: Nick Murphy
- Written by: Stephen Volk; Nick Murphy
- Produced by: David M. Thompson; Sarah Curtis; Julia Stannard
- Starring: Rebecca Hall; Dominic West; Imelda Staunton; Isaac Hempstead-Wright
- Cinematography: Eduard Grau
- Edited by: Victoria Boydell
- Music by: Daniel Pemberton
- Production companies: StudioCanal Features; BBC Films; Creative Scotland; LipSync Productions; Origin Pictures
- Distributed by: StudioCanal
- Release dates: 16 September 2011 (TIFF); 11 November 2011 (United Kingdom)
- Running time: 107 minutes
- Country: United Kingdom
- Language: English
- Budget: £3.1 million
- Box office: $4.4 million

The Awakening is a 2011 British horror film directed by Nick Murphy (in his feature directorial debut) and written by Stephen Volk and Murphy. It stars Rebecca Hall as a writer and paranormal investigator who is invited to a boys' boarding school in post-World War I England to examine reports of a ghost and the recent death of a student.

The film premiered at the 2011 Toronto International Film Festival, and was released in the United Kingdom on 11 November 2011, by StudioCanal. Set in 1921, it follows Florence’s efforts to debunk the supernatural claims, which gradually lead her to confront unexplained occurrences and personal trauma. The narrative incorporates themes related to grief, scepticism, and belief, in the aftermath of war.

Critical response highlighted the film’s atmosphere, cinematography, and Hall’s performance, though some reviewers noted its slow pacing and the contrived twist in the final act. With a production budget of approximately £3.1 million, the film earned around US $4.5 million worldwide. It has been noted for its use of Gothic horror conventions and has drawn comparisons to other British ghost stories such as The Woman in Black.

== Plot ==
In 1921, author Florence Cathcart works with the police to expose fraudulent spiritualists. She lost her fiancé in the First World War and "hunts" ghosts to see if it is possible to bring him back. Robert Mallory, a teacher at a boys' boarding school, asks her to investigate sightings of a child ghost which might have caused the recent death of a pupil. Florence initially refuses, but Robert's concern for the children - whom he describes as being like orphans - changes her mind as she is an orphan herself.

School housekeeper Maud Hill tells Florence she has read her books. Florence's investigation concludes that the sightings are a prank, as two pupils had bullied a third into dressing as a ghost. A teacher admits that he had forced the deceased pupil to stand outside to toughen him up after he claimed to have seen the ghost, causing his fatal asthma attack. The school closes for half-term leaving the only occupants as Florence, Robert, Maud, and Tom, a pupil whose parents live in India.

Florence drops her cigarette case, which belonged to her late fiancé, in the lake. As she reaches for it, a hand reaches for her from the water. She steadies herself then allows herself to fall into the lake. Robert rescues her. Florence insists it was an accident, but Robert and Maud become concerned about her mental health. Florence decides to remain at the school. After chasing what she believes to be the ghost, an apparition of a man with a shotgun appears to shoot her. She also hears a child calling "Mowa Zee", which she tells Tom was her nickname after she was rescued from the lion that orphaned her as a child. Florence and Robert have sex. Groundskeeper Edward Judd, who has a grudge against Robert for being a war hero, attempts to rape Florence in the woods. Assisted by a supernatural apparition, she kills Judd. Robert buries Judd to cover up the incident. Florence asks Robert not to tell Tom, but Robert tells her there are no children at the school.

Florence realises Tom is the ghost. Buried memories begin to surface, and she remembers that the boarding school had been her family home. As a child, she watched as her father murdered her mother with a shotgun and attempted to kill her too. Florence hid inside the walls of the house as her father pursued her, calling out for his "little Mousy." Her father accidentally killed Tom, who is revealed to have been his illegitimate son. Florence then watched her father kill himself. Florence had replaced these memories with false memories of a childhood in Africa.

Florence learns that Robert sees the ghosts of his friends who died in the war, and concludes that ghosts reveal themselves to the lonely. Maud had been her nanny, and was Tom's mother. Maud had arranged for Florence to come to the school because Tom missed her. Maud poisons herself and Florence, intending for their ghosts join Tom. Florence tells Tom that her soul will not rest if she dies now, so Tom brings her medicine.

Florence walks throughout the school. She passes several adults but none notice her, though Victor, a lonely boy at the school who was bullied by the others, does; they exchange hellos. She shares a cigarette with Robert and says that being unable to see ghosts anymore is not the same as forgetting them. They exchange a kiss, she asks him to tell the driver to wait for her, and she tells Robert that she'll see him "Saturday week." Robert watches her walk away; she exchanges greetings with another boy on the lawn.

== Cast ==
- Rebecca Hall as Florence Cathcart
- Dominic West as Robert Mallory
- Imelda Staunton as Maud Hill
- Isaac Hempstead Wright as Thomas "Tom" Hill
- Lucy Cohu as Constance Strickland
- John Shrapnel as Reverend Hugh Purslow
- Shaun Dooley as Malcolm McNair
- Joseph Mawle as Edward Judd
- Andrew Havill as George Vandermeer
- Anastasia Hille as Dorothy Vandermeer

== Production ==
=== Writing ===
Director Nick Murphy said the "film is about people seeing what they need to and seeing what they need to is carrying forth of the film and as such, I wanted to give audiences that chance at the end. Yeah, I know what she is. Rebecca and I decided she’s alive and then she smokes and she gets a car."

=== Filming ===
The Awakening was shot on location in the United Kingdom in Trinity Church Square London, Berwickshire, East Lothian, Lyme Park in Cheshire (the house and 'The Cage', a tower in the grounds) and Manderston House in Manderston from July 2010. Some of the filming was completed at Gosford House near Longniddry in East Lothian.

== Release ==
The film opened at the 2011 Toronto International Film Festival on 16 September 2011, and was officially released 11 November 2011 in the United Kingdom and Ireland. It was released on DVD and Blu-ray in the UK on 26 March 2012, and in North America on 29 January 2013.

== Reception ==
As of October 2021, the film holds an approval rating of 62% on Rotten Tomatoes, based on 74 reviews with an average rating of 5.7/10. The site's consensus reads: "The Awakening never quite quickens the pulse the way it should, yet it remains a well-acted and handsomely assembled example of an old-fashioned supernatural thriller." Robbie Collin of The Daily Telegraph rated the film 4/5 stars and called it "a chilling ghost story plotted like a mystery." Scott Weinberg of Fearnet wrote that the film is a beautiful, satisfying, and concise ghost story with good performances, particularly from Rebecca Hall. John DeFore of The Hollywood Reporter called the film "twisty and atmospheric", elevated above traditional horror films by the beautiful cinematography, rich setting, and strong performances. Rosie Fletcher of Total Film rated it 3/5 stars and called it creepy but predictable. Fletcher wrote that the visuals, setting, and ambiguity help to set it apart. Peter Bradshaw of The Guardian rated it 3/5 stars and wrote that the film is "creepy and disturbing, but is let down by a contrived ending". Roger Ebert rated it 1.5/4 stars and wrote that the film "looks great but never develops a plot with enough clarity to engage us, and the solution to the mystery is I am afraid disappointingly standard." Peter Howell of the Toronto Star rated it 2/4 stars and called the film routine, rote, and "a waste of good atmosphere." Dennis Harvey of Variety called it atmospheric but derivative. Harvey criticises the ending as convoluted and disappointing, though the build-up maintains its promise.
