= The Counselor =

2013 film by Ridley Scott

- Theatrical release poster
- Directed by: Ridley Scott
- Written by: Cormac McCarthy
- Produced by: Ridley Scott; Nick Wechsler; Steve Schwartz; Paula Mae Schwartz
- Starring: Michael Fassbender; Penélope Cruz; Cameron Diaz; Javier Bardem; Brad Pitt
- Cinematography: Dariusz Wolski
- Edited by: Pietro Scalia
- Music by: Daniel Pemberton
- Production companies: Fox 2000 Pictures; Scott Free Productions; Nick Wechsler Productions; Chockstone Pictures; Ingenious Media
- Distributed by: 20th Century Fox
- Release dates: October 3, 2013 (Leicester Square); October 25, 2013 (United States); November 15, 2013 (United Kingdom)
- Running time: 117 minutes
- Countries: United Kingdom; United States
- Language: English
- Budget: $25 million
- Box office: $71 million

The Counselor is a 2013 crime thriller film directed by Ridley Scott and written by Cormac McCarthy. It stars Michael Fassbender as the eponymous Counselor as well as Penélope Cruz, Cameron Diaz, Javier Bardem, and Brad Pitt. The extremely violent and bloodthirsty activities of drug cartels are depicted as the Counselor, a high-level lawyer, gets involved in a drug deal around the troubled Ciudad Juarez, Mexico/Texas border area.

The Counselor was chosen as the closing film at the 2013 Morelia Film Festival and also played at the Cork Film Festival. The film was theatrically released on October 25, 2013, and is dedicated to Scott's brother, Tony Scott, who died in 2012. It received mixed reviews and grossed $71 million worldwide against a budget of $25 million.

== Plot ==
In Mexico, cocaine is packaged in barrels, concealed in a sewage truck, and driven across the border to the United States where it is stored at a sewage treatment plant.

A lawyer from Texas who is known only as the Counselor goes to Amsterdam to meet with a diamond dealer to purchase an engagement ring for his girlfriend, Laura. Returning to the United States, the Counselor attends a party in Texas thrown by drug dealer Reiner and his girlfriend Malkina. He discusses an upcoming drug deal he is going in on with Reiner, which would be the Counselor's first. Their discussion ends with Reiner describing a device called "the bolito" which after being pulled around one's neck, self-constricts and decapitates the victim. Afterwards, at a dinner with Laura, the Counselor proposes marriage and she accepts.

The Counselor meets with Westray, a business associate of Reiner's, to deliver his investment for the drug deal. Westray informs the Counselor of the deal's 4000% return rate, but cautions the Counselor about becoming involved, saying that Mexican cartels are merciless. Despite this, the Counselor remains outwardly confident and unconcerned. Following the conversation with Westray, the Counselor visits a prison inmate named Ruth, a court-appointed client of his who is on trial for murder. Ruth explains that her son is a biker, recently arrested for speeding, and cannot post bail. She asks the Counselor for help and he agrees to bail Ruth's son out as a favor.

Malkina senses an opportunity to undermine the Counselor's upcoming deal and to profit for herself. To that end, she employs "the Wireman" to help her steal the drugs. After discovering that the biker is working for the cartels and has plans to pick up a truck with a drug shipment, the Wireman executes a plan to steal the component needed to start the truck by decapitating the biker with a wire stretched across an empty desert road. With the component in his possession, the Wireman steals the truck containing the cocaine.

Learning of the theft, Westray meets with the Counselor to notify him of the biker's true identity, a valued drug cartel member known as "the Green Hornet". He explains that the biker is now dead, with the cocaine also being stolen, leaving the Counselor culpable in the eyes of the cartel. Westray says he is leaving town immediately and suggests the Counselor do the same, explaining that the cartel's ruthlessness extends to creating "snuff films" where kidnapping victims are filmed being decapitated. The Counselor makes an urgent call to Laura, arranging to meet her in another state, where he will explain the situation to her.

While transporting the drugs, the Wireman is pulled over by two cartel members pretending to be police officers. A gunfight ensues, resulting in the death of the Wireman, his accomplice, one of the cartel members, and an innocent bystander. The surviving cartel member repossesses the truck with the drugs and delivers it to its final destination. Reiner is accidentally killed by cartel members while they attempt to capture him. The cartel then kidnaps Laura.

In a last-ditch effort, the Counselor contacts Jefe, a high-ranking cartel member, for suggestions on what to do next and to plead to spare Laura's life. Jefe begins speaking pseudophilosophically and mocking, citing the life and poetry of Antonio Machado to underline his advice. Jefe darkly and mordantly advises the Counselor to resign himself to his fate that was created by the choices he made long beforehand, and that despite the Counselor's willingness to exchange his life for Laura's, it is too late.

The Counselor remains in Mexico, defeated and in mourning. A package is slipped under the door of his hotel room and in it, he finds a DVD with "Hola!" written on it. Realizing that the disc likely contains a snuff film of Laura sent by the cartel, he breaks down. In an unnamed location, Laura's headless body is dumped into a landfill.

Malkina's failed effort to steal the drugs does not deter her. She tracks Westray to London, where she hires a woman to seduce him and steal his bank codes. She then has accomplices steal Westray's laptop, and he is killed with the "bolito" device that Reiner had previously described. Malkina then meets her banker Michael at a restaurant, coolly explaining how she wants her profits and accounts to be handled and plans to move to Hong Kong.

== Cast ==
- Michael Fassbender as the Counselor
- Penélope Cruz as Laura
- Cameron Diaz as Malkina
- Javier Bardem as Reiner
- Brad Pitt as Westray
- Rosie Perez as Ruth
- Natalie Dormer as the Blonde
- Édgar Ramírez as the Priest
- Bruno Ganz as the Diamond Dealer
- Rubén Blades as 'Jefe'
- Goran Višnjić as Michael
- Velibor Topić as the Sedan Man
- Toby Kebbell as Tony
- Emma Rigby as Tony's girlfriend
- John Leguizamo as Randy
- Dean Norris as the Buyer
- Richard Cabral as 'the Green Hornet', a biker who is Ruth's son
- Sam Spruell as the Wireman
- Alex Hafner as the Second Patrolman
- Andrea Deck as the Watching Girl
- Dar Dash as the Barman
- Paris Jefferson as the Waitress

== Literary references ==
In the second half of the film, Jefe recites directly from the poem Campos de Castilla by Spanish poet Antonio Machado. "Caminante, no hay camino. Se hace camino al andar," which translates in its original context as: Wanderer, there is no road; the road is made as you go along. Jefe shares this line from the poem as well as details about Machado's reflections regarding the prospects of his own life after learning of his wife being diagnosed with terminal tuberculosis. Jefe concludes by telling the Counselor, "You are the world you have created. And when you cease to exist, that world you have created will also cease to exist."

== Production ==
=== Pre-production ===
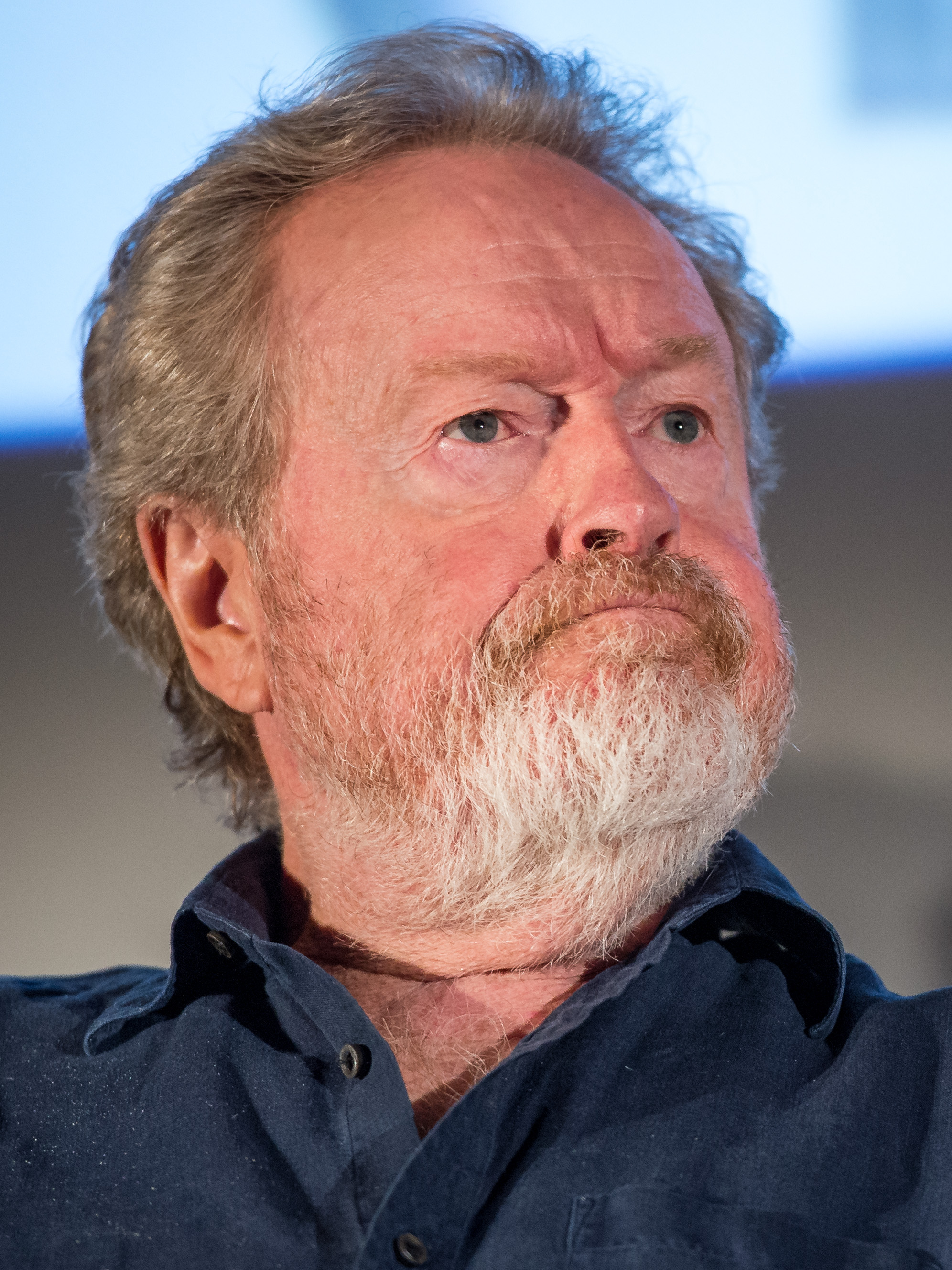
Director Scott in 2015

On January 18, 2012, it was reported that novelist Cormac McCarthy had sold his first spec script, The Counselor, to Nick Wechsler, Steve Schwartz and Paula Mae Schwartz, who had previously produced the film adaptation of McCarthy's novel The Road. On January 31, it was reported that Ridley Scott was currently considering several directorial projects, but that there was a strong possibility that The Counselor would be his next film and his follow-up to Prometheus. On February 9, it was confirmed that Scott would direct and produce the film. Cormac McCarthy, Mark Huffam, Michael Schaefer and Michael Costigan are credited as executive producers.

=== Filming ===
Principal photography began on July 27, 2012, in London. The film was also shot in Spain and the United States. On August 20, 2012, Scott halted production of the film due to his brother Tony's death. He canceled that week's shoot in order to travel to Los Angeles to be with his brother's family. Scott returned to London to resume production on September 3.

The film was dedicated to the memory of Tony Scott, and Matt Baker, the second assistant director on the film who had since died.

=== Design ===
Costume designer Janty Yates collaborated with Giorgio Armani on the film as a part of a new partnership between Armani and 20th Century Fox that also extended into retail and digital initiatives. Armani was enlisted to create the wardrobes for the characters portrayed by Michael Fassbender and Penélope Cruz. In addition to Armani, designer Paula Thomas also contributed to the film's wardrobe by dressing Cameron Diaz's character, Malkina, with roughly 15 different outfits. "[It wasn't until] I read the script that I realized why [Scott] called upon me," said Thomas. "[Cameron's] character has a lot of elements of a Thomas Wylde (her own design label) woman. [She's] bold, edgy, modern. She's about wanting to be seen, as opposed to blending into the background."

For Javier Bardem's character, Yates applied a widely colorful wardrobe that was mostly made up of pieces of Versace. As for Bardem's hair, the idea was the actor's own and inspired by film producer Brian Grazer's hairdo.

=== Music ===
The film score to The Counselor was composed by Daniel Pemberton. Pemberton recorded the score with a full orchestra at Abbey Road Studios in addition to integrating home-recorded guitar noises and textures. "Ridley responds really well to interesting and unusual sounds," explained Pemberton on the composer-director relationship. "So as a composer who likes making unusual sounds, that's exciting. It was daunting but he was great to work with and up for experimenting. [...] He made the process a lot less scary than it should have been." A soundtrack album was released digitally on October 22 and in physical forms on November 11, 2013, by Milan Records.

=== Screenplay ===
- McCarthy, Cormac (June 10–17, 2013). "Scenes of the crime". The New Yorker. Vol. 89, no. 17. pp. 66–69.

== Marketing ==
A short film was commissioned for the film starring Michael Fassbender in character buying lingerie from "the Blonde" played by Natalie Dormer. It was directed by Johnny Hardstaff and released as an exclusive by GQ magazine online.

== Reception ==
=== Box office ===
The Counselor grossed $17 million in the United States and Canada, and $54 million in other territories, for a total of $71 million, against a production budget of $25 million.

Preliminary reports had The Counselor tracking for an $8–13 million debut in North America. The film opened to $3.2 million in 3,336 locations on Friday and opened at #4 in the box office with just a $7.8 million over the weekend.

=== Critical response ===
On review aggregator website Rotten Tomatoes, the film has an approval rating of 34% based on 217 reviews, with an average rating of 5/10. The site's critical consensus reads, "The Counselor raises expectations with its talented cast and creative crew—then subverts them with a wordy and clumsy suspense thriller that's mercilessly short on suspense or thrills." On Metacritic, the film has a weighted average score of 48 out of 100, based on 42 critics, indicating "mixed or average reviews". A 2017 data analysis of Metacritic reviews by Gizmodo UK found The Counselor to be the second most critically divisive film of recent years. Audiences polled by CinemaScore gave the film an average grade of "D" on an A+ to F scale.

Todd McCarthy of The Hollywood Reporter gave a negative review, calling it "not a very likable or gratifying film", adding that "one is left with a very bleak ending and an only slightly less depressing sense of the waste of a lot of fine talent both behind and in front of the camera." Mark Kermode listed it as number two on his Ten Worst Films of 2013. Los Angeles Times critic Kenneth Turan stated, "As cold, precise and soulless as the diamonds that figure briefly in its plot, The Counselor is an extremely unpleasant piece of business." Peter Debruge of Variety criticized Cormac McCarthy's script, saying that his "first original script is nearly all dialogue, but it's a lousy story, ineptly constructed and rendered far too difficult to follow."

Conversely, Richard Roeper of the Chicago Sun-Times gave the film four stars out of four, saying, "Director Ridley Scott and screenwriter Cormac McCarthy have fashioned a sexy, sometimes shockingly violent, literate and richly textured tale of the Shakespearean consequences of one man's irrevocable act of avarice" and called it "a bloody great time". In addition, Manohla Dargis of The New York Times gave it a rave review, stating that "Mr. McCarthy appears to have never read a screenwriting manual in his life [...] That's a compliment." Danny Leigh of the BBC programme Film 2013 praised the film, saying that "the real star is the script. What this film really is is a Cormac McCarthy audiobook with visuals by Ridley Scott. It's black as night, engrossing and masterful." He also acclaimed the performances, particularly Diaz's, and said, with regard to the negative reviews, "Movie history is littered with films that we all sneered at and we all laughed at and we all thought were terrible and the critics hated them and no-one went to see them, and then 40 years later they fetch up on programmes like this with everyone saying 'what a masterpiece!'"

Scott Foundas, critic for Variety, wrote a defense of the film titled "Why The Counselor Is One of Ridley Scott's Best Films" in which he compared it to John Boorman's Point Blank (1967) and the screenplay to the work of David Mamet, Harold Pinter, and Quentin Tarantino. Foundas writes that the film "is bold and thrilling in ways that mainstream American movies rarely are, and its rejection suggests what little appetite there is for real daring at the multiplex nowadays." Filmmaker Guillermo del Toro also praised the film, stating that the film is "a meditation of the illusory nature of normalcy and the devastation to come."

Later Ridley Scott said: “The Counselor, to me, was the best dialogue I’ve ever had. Cormac McCarthy wrote the script, and he brought it to me with [producer] Nick Wechsler. I said, “I'll do it now, but it has to be now.” And from that, I got it cast in two weeks—Michael Fassbender, Brad Pitt, Javier Bardem, Penélope Cruz, Cameron Diaz ... they were all fighting to do these parts. I got some disastrous reviews, I'm told. It was very good film, but too dark for the average person. I think the dialogue is beautiful.“

=== Accolades ===
Year	Group	Award	Result	Notes
2014	London Critics Circle Film Awards	British Actor of the Year	Nominated	Michael Fassbender
2014	MTV Movie Awards	Best WTF Moment	Nominated	Cameron Diaz
