= Nick Murphy (director) =

British film director

- Occupation(s): Film director, television director
- Years active: 1999–present

Nick Murphy is a British film director and television director. He is best known for directing the films The Awakening (2011) (also writer) and Blood (2012).

== Filmography ==
He has directed episodes of the television series Paddington Green, Primeval, Occupation and the docudramas How Art Made the World, Surviving Disaster, Ancient Rome: The Rise and Fall of an Empire and Heroes and Villains. He also wrote the episodes for all the docudramas he directed.
