= 2005 in animation =

2005 in animation is an overview of notable events, including notable awards, list of films released, television show debuts and endings, and notable deaths.

== Events ==
=== January ===
- January 7: The first episode of Pocoyo airs.
- January 18: The Tom and Jerry direct-to-video film Tom and Jerry: Blast Off to Mars releases on VHS and DVD.
- January 21:
  - American Dragon: Jake Long premieres on Disney Channel.
  - Season 2 of Foster's Home for Imaginary Friends begins on Cartoon Network with the premiere of the episode "Partying Is Such Sweet Soiree".

=== February ===
- February 4: The Foster's Home for Imaginary Friends episodes "Where There's a Wilt, There's a Way/Everyone Knows It's Bendy" premiere on Cartoon Network, the latter episode was very negatively received by fans due to the new one-time character Bendy constantly blaming Bloo & the gang for his own wrong-doings, and with Mr. Herriman & Frankie actually believing Bendy, leading to them punishing Bloo & the others for no reason. Craig McCracken & Lauren Faust even ended up apologizing to fans of the show for having this episode made in the first place.
- February 6: The pilot episode of American Dad! airs on Fox as a sneak peek.
- February 20:
  - The first episode of Robot Chicken airs.
  - The Simpsons episode "There's Something About Marrying" premieres, in which the character Patty Bouvier outs herself as a lesbian.
- February 21: The first episode of Avatar: The Last Airbender airs.
- February 27: 77th Academy Awards:
  - The Incredibles, directed by Brad Bird and produced by the Walt Disney Company, wins the Academy Award for Best Animated Feature.
  - Ryan by Chris Landreth wins the Academy Award for Best Animated Short Film.
  - In their 100 Greatest series, the British TV channel Channel 4 broadcasts the "100 Greatest Cartoons!", a list of the 100 greatest animated cartoons, as voted by viewers.

=== March ===
- March 9: Season 9 of South Park begins on Comedy Central with the premiere of the episode "Mr. Garrison's Fancy New Vagina". The character Mr. Garrison gets a surgical sex change in this episode & becomes "Ms. Garrison" for the next 3 years/seasons.
- March 11:
  - The first episode of Wonder Showzen airs, an adult parody of children's educational shows.
  - Blue Sky Studios releases Robots, directed by Chris Wedge.
- March 25:
  - The first episode of Krypto the Superdog is broadcast.
  - The final episode of The Powerpuff Girls airs. While the series itself gained generally positive attention, it was cancelled following the poor critical reception of The Powerpuff Girls Movie as Cartoon Network ceased production of the series in 2003.
- March 28: Turner Broadcasting splits Adult Swim off from Cartoon Network after the block debuted in 2001, as the Nielsen Media Research could treat it as a separate channel for ratings purposes.

=== April ===
- April 1: Season 4 of The Grim Adventures of Billy & Mandy begins on Cartoon Network (ahead of its third season's finale) with the premiere of the episodes "He's Not Dead, He's My Mascot/Hog Wild".
- April 14: Noitamina, a programing block created for Fuji TV, premieres with its first program Honey and Clover.
- April 17: The Simpsons' 350th episode "Future-Drama" premieres on Fox, guest starring Amy Poehler as Bart's future girlfriend Jenda & John DiMaggio as Futurama's Bender. The episode was seen by just over 8.3 million viewers that night.

=== May ===
- May 1:
  - The Animation Domination programming block launches on Fox.
  - Family Guy returns to Fox after a three-year cancellation with the premiere of its fourth season, the episode being "North by North Quahog".
  - American Dad! makes its official premiere on Fox with the episode "Threat Levels".
- May 2: The first episode of Fifi and the Flowertots airs.
- May 6: SpongeBob SquarePants returns to Nickelodeon after a seven-month hiatus with the premiere of its fourth season, the episodes being "Fear of a Krabby Patty/Shell of a Man".
- May 9: Japanese animation studio A-1 Pictures is founded.
- May 10:
  - Marco Nguyen, Pierre Perifel, Xavier Ramonède, Olivier Staphylas and Rémi Zaarour's Le Building premieres.
  - The Fairly OddParents episode "It's a Wishful Life" premieres on Nickelodeon. This episode was negatively received by fans due to Jorgen showing Timmy that everyone lives would be so much better if the latter was never born, which is the exact opposite message that It's a Wonderful Life (the film that this episode is parodying) taught us.
- May 13: Michel Ocelot and Bénédicte Galup's Kirikou and the Wild Beasts premieres.
- May 15:
  - King of the Hill concludes its ninth season on Fox with the episode "It Ain't Over 'til the Fat Neighbor Sings". The episode was watched just over 4.5 million viewers that night.
  - The Simpsons concludes its 16th season on Fox with the following episodes:
    - "Home Away from Homer", which guest stars Jason Bateman as himself. The episode watched by over 8.1 million viewers that night.
    - "The Father, the Son, and the Holy Guest Star", which guest stars Liam Neeson. The episode watched by nearly 9.7 million viewers that night.
- May 27: Eric Darnell and Tom McGrath's Madagascar premieres.
- May 30: The first episode of The Life and Times of Juniper Lee premieres.

=== June ===
- June 10: The Fairly OddParents concludes its fourth season on Nickelodeon with the premiere of its third TV-movie "School's Out: The Musical!", which reeled in a total of just nearly 4 million viewers that night.
- June 17:
  - Danny Phantom concludes its first season on Nickelodeon with the episode "Control Freaks".
  - The Grim Adventures of Billy & Mandy concludes its third season on Cartoon Network with the episodes "Dream Mutt/Scythe For Sale".
- June 18: The Adventures of Jimmy Neutron, Boy Genius half-hour special "The League of Villains" premieres on Nickelodeon. This is the show's series finale by production order, but a bunch of unaired episodes would still continue to premiere on the network.
- June 19: American Dad! concludes its first season on Fox with the episode "Deacon Stan, Jesus Man". The season's finale was seen by over 6.5 million viewers that night.
- June 22: Happy Tree Friends Volume 3 - Third Strike renews its theatrical release by adding episodes of 19 to 21 of the Internet Season 2, as well as Dino-Sore Days (an irregular episode), a Buddhist Monkey episode (Books of Fury).
- June 24: Season 2 of Danny Phantom begins on Nickelodeon with the premiere of the episode "Memory Blank".

=== July ===
- July 8: The first episode of Camp Lazlo premieres on Cartoon Network.
- July 9:
  - Disneyland receives a star at the Hollywood Walk of Fame, the first and only theme park to receive this honor.
  - The first episode of Catscratch and Time Warp Trio airs.
- July 15: Foster's Home for Imaginary Friends concludes its second season on Cartoon Network with the episode "My So Called Wife".
- July 22: Season 3 of Foster's Home for Imaginary Friends begins on Cartoon Network with the premiere of the episode "Eddie Monster".

=== August ===
- August 12: The Proud Family episode "Who You Callin' a Sissy?" airs only once on Disney Channel due to allegations with the LGBT-related content in the episode before reinstating it 15 years later prior to the reboot in 2022.
- August 19: Disney Channel's The Proud Family Movie premieres. This film is later confirmed non-canon regarding the inconsistent aging of Penny Proud.

=== September ===
- Specific date unknown
  - Happy Tree Friends and Friends premieres, adding episodes of 25 to 26 of the Internet Season 2 on G4.
  - Chorion completes its purchase of Silver Lining Entertainment.
- September 3: The Tom and Jerry Direct-to-video film Tom and Jerry: The Fast and the Furry premieres in theaters in selected cities. The movie later released on VHS and DVD on October 11th.
- September 4: Wallace & Gromit: The Curse of the Were-Rabbit premieres.
- September 6: The first episode of Go, Diego, Go! airs.
- September 7: Tim Burton and Mike Johnson's Corpse Bride is released.
- September 11:
  - Season 17 of The Simpsons begins on Fox with the premiere of the episode "The Bonfire of the Manatees". The episode watched by exactly 11.1 million viewers that night.
  - Season 2 of American Dad! begins on Fox with the premiere of the episode "Bullocks to Stan". The episode watched by over 7.8 million viewers that night.
- September 17: The first episodes of Johnny Test, Loonatics Unleashed, Coconut Fred's Fruit Salad Island!, and Pokémon: Advanced Battle airs.
- September 18: Season 10 of King of the Hill begins on Fox with the premiere of the episode "Hank's on Board". The episode watched by over 7.1 million viewers that night.
- September 23: Nicktoons rebranded itself as Nicktoons Network. It remains rebranded for four years before returning to its former name. Happy Tree Friends - Mole in the city was theatrically debuted on the same day.
- September 26: Sprout Network is launched by a joint venture between PBS, Comcast, HIT Entertainment, and Sesame Workshop when the new network replaces PBS Kids.
- September 27: The Tom and Jerry short The Karate Guard premieres in theaters all across Los Angeles.

=== October ===
- October 9: The first episode of Little Einsteins airs.
- October 10: A fire destroys most of Aardman Animations' archive warehouse, including most of Nick Park's creations and the models and sets used in the film Chicken Run. Some of the original Wallace & Gromit models and sets, as well as the master prints of the finished films, were stored elsewhere and were not destroyed.
- October 21: The Grim Adventures of Billy & Mandy concludes its fourth season on Cartoon Network with the half-hour special "Prank Call of Cthulhu".
- October 23: Bratz Rock Angelz premieres.
- October 28: The stand-alone Ed, Edd n Eddy Halloween special "Ed, Edd n Eddy's Boo Haw Haw" premieres on Cartoon Network.
- October 30: Disney's Chicken Little premieres in theaters, it receives mixed to negative reception by fans & critics.

=== November ===
- November 4: Ed, Edd n Eddy returns to Cartoon Network from its original series finale in 2004 with the premiere of its fifth season, with the episodes being "Mission Ed-Possible/Every Which Way but Ed".
- November 6:
  - The first episode of The Boondocks airs.
  - The Simpsons' "Treehouse of Horror XVI" premieres on Fox.
- November 25: The first episode of The X's airs.

=== December ===
- December 2: Avatar: The Last Airbender concludes its first season on Nickelodeon with the half-hour special "The Siege of the North". The season's finale was seen by 3.6 million viewers that night.
- December 4: Season 4 of Aqua Teen Hunger Force begins on Adult Swim with the premiere of the episode "Dirtfoot".
- December 6: Run Wrake's award-winning animated short Rabbit premieres.
- December 7: South Park concludes its ninth season on Comedy Central with the episode "Bloody Mary".
- December 16: The Happy Tree Friends - Ski Patrol film makes its first television debut.
- December 20: Toy Story is added to the National Film Registry in honor of the film's 10th anniversary.
- December 22: The animated music video for Lemon Demon's The Ultimate Showdown of Ultimate Destiny is released.
- December 26: The first episode of My Gym Partner's a Monkey airs as a sneak peek before the series' official premiere on February 24, 2006.
- December 27: The first episode of the original Ben 10 series airs.

== Awards ==
- Academy Award for Best Animated Feature: The Incredibles
- Academy Award for Best Animated Short Film: Ryan
- Animation Kobe Feature Film Award: Zeta Gundam A New Translation: Heirs to the Stars
- Annie Award for Best Animated Feature: Wallace & Gromit: The Curse of the Were-Rabbit
- Goya Award for Best Animated Film: Midsummer Dream
- Japan Media Arts Festival Animation Award: Flow
- Mainichi Film Awards – Animation Grand Award: Fullmetal Alchemist the Movie: Conqueror of Shamballa

== Films released ==
- January 6 - DragonBlade: The Legend of Lang (Hong Kong)
- January 10 - Among the Thorns (Sweden)
- January 11:
  - The Land Before Time XI: Invasion of the Tinysauruses (United States)
  - Lil' Pimp (United States)
- January 18 - Tom and Jerry: Blast Off to Mars (United States)
- January 29 - Tennis no Ōjisama – Futari no Samurai (Japan)
- February 1 - Mulan II (United States)
- February 2 - The Magic Roundabout (United Kingdom and France)
- February 3 - Felix – A Rabbit on a World Tour (Germany)
- February 5 - Air (Japan)
- February 8 - Aloha, Scooby-Doo! (United States)
- February 11 - Pooh's Heffalump Movie (United States)
- February 24 - Pirates in the Pacific (Peru)
- March 4 - Gisaku (Spain)
- March 5 - One Piece: Baron Omatsuri and the Secret Island (Japan)
- March 6 - Barbie: Fairytopia (United States)
- March 8:
  - Candy Land: The Great Lollipop Adventure (United States)
  - VeggieTales: Duke and the Great Pie War (United States)
- March 11 - Robots (United States)
- March 15 - Tugger: The Jeep 4x4 Who Wanted to Fly (United States)
- March 25 - Valiant (United Kingdom)
- April 6 - My Little Pony: Friends are Never Far Away (United States)
- April 8 - Kim Possible: So the Drama (United States)
- April 9 - Detective Conan: Strategy Above the Depths (Japan)
- April 16:
  - Crayon Shin-chan: The Legend Called Buri Buri 3 Minutes Charge (Japan)
  - Futari wa Pretty Cure Max Heart the Movie (Japan)
- April 29 - The Golden Blaze (United States)
- May 8 - Fire Ball (Taiwan)
- May 17 - Dinotopia: Quest for the Ruby Sunstone (United States)
- May 27 - Madagascar (United States)
- May 28 - Mobile Suit Zeta Gundam: A New Translation I – Heirs to the Stars (Japan)
- May 30 - The King: The Story of King David (United States)
- June 2 - Ark (United States and South Korea)
- June 14 - Tarzan II (United States)
- June 25 - VeggieTales: Minnesota Cuke and the Search for Samson's Hairbrush (United States)
- July 1 - Midsummer Dream (Spain and Portugal)
- July 8 - The Book of the Dead (Japan)
- July 16 - Pokémon: Lucario and the Mystery of Mew (Japan)
- July 23 - Fullmetal Alchemist the Movie: Conqueror of Shamballa (Japan)
- August 6 - Naruto the Movie 2: Great Clash! The Illusionary Ruins at the Depths of the Earth (Japan)
- August 12:
  - Empress Chung (South Korea and North Korea)
  - Escape from Cluster Prime (United States)
  - Renart the Fox (Luxembourg)
- August 19:
  - Imaginum (Mexico)
  - The Proud Family Movie (United States)
- August 20 - xxxHolic: A Midsummer Night's Dream (Japan)
- August 30:
  - Lilo & Stitch 2: Stitch Has a Glitch (United States)
  - My Scene Goes Hollywood (United States)
- September - Little Soldier Zhang Ga (China)
- September 6 - Inspector Gadget's Biggest Caper Ever (Canada and United States)
- September 13 - Pooh's Heffalump Halloween Movie (United States)
- September 14 - Final Fantasy VII Advent Children (Japan)
- September 17 - Here Comes Peter Cottontail: The Movie (United States)
- September 18 - Barbie and the Magic of Pegasus 3-D (United States)
- September 20 - LeapFrog: Learn to Read at the Storybook Factory (United States)
- September 23 - Corpse Bride (United States)
- September 26 - Heidi (United Kingdom, Canada, and Germany)
- September 27 - Stewie Griffin: The Untold Story (United States)
- September 29 - The Little Polar Bear 2 – The Mysterious Island (Germany)
- October 4 - Bratz – Rock Angelz (United States)
- October 7 - Wallace & Gromit: The Curse of the Were-Rabbit (United Kingdom)
- October 11:
  - Bionicle 3: Web of Shadows (United States)
  - Stuart Little 3: Call of the Wild (United States)
  - Tom and Jerry: The Fast and the Furry (United States)
- October 16 - Negadon: The Monster from Mars (Japan)
- October 18:
  - The Batman vs Dracula: The Animated Movie (United States)
  - Care Bears: Big Wish Movie (Canada)
  - The Legend of Frosty the Snowman (United States)
- October 21 - Hanuman (India)
- October 25:
  - My Little Pony: A Very Minty Christmas (United States)
  - Street Fighter Alpha: Generations (Japan)
- October 28 - The Three Musketeers (Denmark and Latvia)
- October 29:
  - Mobile Suit Zeta Gundam: A New Translation II – Lovers (Japan)
  - VeggieTales: Lord of the Beans (United States)
- November 4:
  - Chicken Little (United States)
  - Disaster! (United States)
  - The Nameless Warrior: The Mercenary (Argentina and Spain)
- November 22 - Kong: King of Atlantis (United States)
- November 25:
  - Olentzero and the Magic Log (Spain)
  - Pettson and Findus: Pettson's Promise (Sweden)
- December 2 - The Happy Elf (United States)
- December 7 - Kirikou and the Wild Beasts (France)
- December 10:
  - Futari wa Pretty Cure Max Heart 2: Friends of the Snow-Laden Sky (Japan)
  - On a Stormy Night (Japan)
- December 13:
  - Kronk's New Groove (United States)
  - Scooby-Doo! in Where's My Mummy? (United States)
- December 16 - Hoodwinked! (United States)
- December 23 - Gulliver's Travel (India)
- December 25 - Xuxinha and Guto against the Space Monsters (Brazil)
- December 30 - Thru the Moebius Strip (China)
- Specific date unknown:
  - Action Man: X Missions – The Movie (United States)
  - Ali Baba and the Forty Thieves: The Lost Scimitar of Arabia (United States)
  - Christmas in New York (Italy)
  - Klay World: Off the Table (United States)
  - Mother Teresa (Italy)
  - Muttabar (Ukraine)
  - Rest On Your Shoulder (China)
  - The Toy Warrior (South Korea)
  - Txirri, Mirri y Txiribiton (Spain)

== Television series debuts ==
Date	Title	Channel	Year
January 3	Toopy and Binoo	Treehouse TV	2005–2006
January 7	Pocoyo (2005)	YouTube, Clan, Channel 5, Nick Jr	2005–present
January 17	Auto-B-Good	Syndication	2005–2006
January 21	American Dragon: Jake Long	Disney Channel	2005–2007
January 23	Pet Alien	Cartoon Network	2005
February 6	American Dad!	Fox, TBS	2005–present
February 20	Robot Chicken	Adult Swim	2005–present
February 21	Avatar: The Last Airbender	Nickelodeon	2005–2008
March 11	Wonder Showzen	MTV2	2005–2006
March 25	Krypto the Superdog	Cartoon Network	2005–2006
May 2	Fifi and the Flowertots	Channel 5, Sprout	2005–2010
May 30	The Life and Times of Juniper Lee	Cartoon Network	2005–2007
June 17	The Buzz on Maggie	Disney Channel	2005–2006
June 19	12 oz. Mouse	Adult Swim	2005–2007
July 8	Camp Lazlo	Cartoon Network	2005–2008
July 9	Catscratch	Nickelodeon	2005–2007
July 9	Time Warp Trio	Discovery Kids	2005–2006
August 19	Hopeless Pictures	IFC	2005
August 19	Greg the Bunny	IFC	2005–2006
August 19	SuperNews!	Current TV	2005–2010
August 22	Firehouse Tales	Cartoon Network	2005–2007
August 22	Gerald McBoing-Boing	Cartoon Network	2005–2007
September 4	Ribert and Robert's Wonderworld	Syndicated through PBS Kids	2005–2008
September 5	Danger Rangers	Syndicated through PBS Kids	2005–2006
September 5	The Zula Patrol	Syndicated through PBS Kids	2005–2008
September 6	Go, Diego, Go!	Nick Jr.	2005–2011
September 10	Bratz	4Kids	2005–2008
September 17	Loonatics Unleashed	Kids' WB	2005–2007
September 17	Coconut Fred's Fruit Salad Island	Kids' WB	2005–2006
September 17	Pokémon: Advanced Battle	Kids' WB	2005–2006
September 17	Johnny Test	Kids' WB	2005–2008
September 19	Get Ed	Jetix	2005–2006
October 2	Sunday Pants	Cartoon Network	2005
October 3	Trollz	Syndication	2005
October 9	Little Einsteins	Playhouse Disney	2005–2009
October 9	Squidbillies	Adult Swim	2005–2021
November 6	The Boondocks	Adult Swim	2005–2014
November 6	Minoriteam	Adult Swim	2005–2006
November 25	The X's	Nickelodeon	2005–2006
December 13	Moral Orel	Adult Swim	2005–2009
December 26	My Gym Partner's a Monkey (Note: The show first aired as a sneak preview only, it officially premiered on February 24, 2006.)	Cartoon Network	2005–2008
December 27	Ben 10 (Note: The show first aired as a sneak preview only, it officially premiered on January 13, 2006.)	Cartoon Network	2005–2008

== Television series endings ==
Date	Title	Channel	Year	Notes
January 15	Megas XLR	Cartoon Network	2004–2005	Ended
January 22	Dave the Barbarian	Disney Channel	2004–2005	Ended
February 6	The Super Milk Chan Show	Adult Swim	2004–2005	Ended
February 14	Rubbadubbers	Nick Jr	2003–2005	Ended
February 19	Kenny the Shark	Discovery Kids	2003–2005	Ended
February 26	¡Mucha Lucha!	Kids' WB	2002–2005	Ended
March 25	The Powerpuff Girls (1998)	Cartoon Network	1998–2005	Ended
March 25	Star Wars: Clone Wars	Cartoon Network	2003–2005	Ended
April 20	Baby Looney Tunes	Cartoon Network	2001–2005	Ended
April 24	Sealab 2021	Adult Swim	2001–2005	Ended
May 26	Pet Alien	Cartoon Network	2005	Cancelled, until remaining episodes aired on Kabillion in 2007.
May 27	Father of the Pride	NBC	2004–2005	Cancelled
June 15	CatDog	Nicktoons	1998–2005	Ended
July 8	Jackie Chan Adventures	Kids' WB	2000–2005	Ended
July 22	Video Mods	MTV2	2004–2005	Cancelled
August 19	The Proud Family	Disney Channel	2001–2005	Ended
September 10	Pokémon: Advanced Challenge	Kids' WB	2004–2005	Ended
October 14	Hopeless Pictures	IFC	2005	Cancelled
October 30	Sunday Pants	Cartoon Network	2005	Cancelled
November 8	Trollz	Syndication	2005	Cancelled
November 11	Duck Dodgers	Cartoon Network	2003–2005	Ended
November 25	Jay Jay the Jet Plane	PBS Kids	1998–2001, 2005	Ended
November 25	Dragon Tales	PBS Kids	1999–2002, 2005	Ended
November 27	Fatherhood	Nick at Nite	2004–2005	Cancelled
December 25	Stroker & Hoop	Adult Swim	2004–2005	Cancelled

== Television season premieres ==
Date	Title	Season	Channel
January 17	Teen Titans	4	Cartoon Network
February 21	Foster's Home for Imaginary Friends	2	Cartoon Network
March 9	South Park	9	Comedy Central
April 22	Hi Hi Puffy AmiYumi	2	Cartoon Network
May 1	Family Guy (Note: Revived after being cancelled for the past 3 years.)	4	Fox
May 6	SpongeBob SquarePants	4	Nickelodeon
June 24	Danny Phantom	2	Nickelodeon
June 24	The Grim Adventures of Billy & Mandy	4	Cartoon Network
July 22	Foster's Home for Imaginary Friends	3	Cartoon Network
September 11	American Dad!	2	Fox
September 11	The Simpsons	17	Fox
September 18	King of the Hill	10	Fox
September 24	Teen Titans	5	Cartoon Network
September 30	Codename: Kids Next Door	5	Cartoon Network
October 9	The Life and Times of Juniper Lee	2	Cartoon Network
October 14	Camp Lazlo	2	Cartoon Network
October 19	Drawn Together	2	Comedy Central
November 4	Ed, Edd n Eddy	5	Cartoon Network
December 4	Aqua Teen Hunger Force	4	Adult Swim (Cartoon Network)

== Television season finales ==
Date	Title	Season	Channel
January 22	Teen Titans	3	Cartoon Network
March 25	Hi Hi Puffy AmiYumi	1	Cartoon Network
May 15	King of the Hill	9	Fox
May 15	The Simpsons	16	Fox
June 10	The Fairly OddParents	4	Nickelodeon
June 17	Danny Phantom	1	Nickelodeon
June 17	The Grim Adventures of Billy & Mandy	3	Cartoon Network
June 19	American Dad!	1	Fox
July 15	Foster's Home for Imaginary Friends	2	Cartoon Network
July 16	Teen Titans	4	Cartoon Network
July 22	Codename: Kids Next Door	4	Cartoon Network
August 21	The Life and Times of Juniper Lee	1	Cartoon Network
September 9	My Life as a Teenage Robot	2	Nickelodeon
September 16	Camp Lazlo	1	Cartoon Network
October 21	The Grim Adventures of Billy & Mandy	4	Cartoon Network
November 25	Hi Hi Puffy AmiYumi	2	Cartoon Network
December 2	Avatar: The Last Airbender	1	Nickelodeon
December 7	South Park	9	Comedy Central

== Births ==
=== January ===
- January 8: Collin Dean, American actor (voice of Hiroshi in Welcome to the Space Show, Tiffany and Candy Kids in Adventure Time, Gregory in Over the Garden Wall, Lincoln Loud in seasons 1-3 of The Loud House, Oto in Doki, Camper in the American Dad! episode "Camp Campawanda", announcer for Boomerang).
- January 25: Avantika Vandanapu, American actress (voice of Kamala in Mira, Royal Detective, Sareena Tapoor in the Mickey Mouse Mixed-Up Adventures episode "A Gollywood Wedding!").

=== February ===
- February 25: Noah Jupe, British actor (voice of Peter in The Magician's Elephant).

=== May ===
- May 5: Gabrielle Nevaeh Green, American actress (voice of Clawdeen Wolf in Monster High, Elle in Gremlins: Secrets of the Mogwai).
- May 19: Jack Gore, American actor (voice of young Valiente in Ferdinand, young Patrick Star in The SpongeBob Movie: Sponge on the Run).

=== June ===
- June 14: Tamara Smart, English actress (voice of Siobhan Klaxon in Wendell & Wild).
- June 25: Kylie Cantrall, American actress, singer, songwriter and YouTuber (voice of Savannah Meades in Ron's Gone Wrong).

=== July ===
- July 12: Issac Ryan Brown, American actor (voice of Goby in season 4 of Bubble Guppies, Haruna Kitumba in Miles from Tomorrowland, Chomper in The Land Before Time XIV: Journey of the Brave, Chai in Whisker Haven, Bingo in seasons 1-3 of Puppy Dog Pals, Brett in All I Want for Christmas Is You, Ric in Next Gen, Everett Nichols in Costume Quest, Gus Porter in The Owl House, Stinky in The Stinky & Dirty Show, Bra Jabu in Kiya & the Kimoja Heroes).
- July 25: Pierce Gagnon, American actor (voice of Tim Templeton in The Boss Baby: Back in Business, Tiago in Rio 2, young Fred Jones in Scoob!, Ryan Miller in The Loud House episode "Family Bonding").

=== August ===
- August 8: Kitana Turnbull, American actress (voice of Kit Secord in The Rocketeer, Sydney in Puppy Dog Pals, Lyds in Spirit Riding Free, Olivia in Elena of Avalor, Minu in Shimmer and Shine).

=== September ===
- September 7: Ruth Righi, American actress (voice of the title character in Eureka!).

=== October ===
- October 1: Rosalie Chiang, American actress (voice of Mei Lee in Turning Red, Chika Amabe in Suzume).

=== November ===
- November 16: Ava Morse, American actress (voice of Ava in Ron's Gone Wrong, Miriam in Turning Red, Cinder in Firebuds).

=== December ===
- December 14: Mia Sinclair Jenness, American actress (voice of the title character in Fancy Nancy, young Powder in Arcane).
- December 30: Brady Noon, American actor (voice of Greg Heffley in Diary of a Wimpy Kid and Diary of a Wimpy Kid: Rodrick Rules, Raphael in Teenage Mutant Ninja Turtles: Mutant Mayhem).

== Deaths ==
=== January ===
- January 15: Dan Lee, Canadian animator and character designer (Disney Television Animation, Pixar), dies at age 35.
- January 24: Steve Susskind, American actor (voice of J.J. Eureka Vatos in The Tick, Irate Chef in The Emperor's New Groove, Jerry Slugworth in Monsters, Inc., Sergeant Squash in the DuckTales episode "Duckworth's Revolt", Maxie Zeus in the Batman: The Animated Series episode "Fire from Olympus"), dies in an automobile accident at age 62.
- January 23: Johnny Carson, American television host, comedian writer and producer (voiced himself in The Simpsons episode "Krusty Gets Kancelled"), dies from respiratory failure at age 79.
- January 25: Chad Grothkopf, American comics artist and animator (Walt Disney Animation Studios, Fleischer Studios, Hanna-Barbera, DePatie-Freleng Enterprises, Chuck Jones, Jay Ward Productions, Terrytoons, Tiny Toon Adventures), dies at age 90 or 91.
- January 28: Daniel Branca, Argentine animator and comic artist, dies at age 53.
- January 29: Ron Feinberg, American actor (voice of Headstrong in The Transformers, André the Giant in Hulk Hogan's Rock 'n' Wrestling, Doc Terror in Centurions, Titanus in Teenage Mutant Ninja Turtles, Ming the Merciless in Defenders of the Earth, Vladimir Goudenov Grizzlikof in Darkwing Duck), dies at age 72.

=== February ===
- February 1: John Vernon, Canadian actor (voice of Rupert Thorne in Batman: The Animated Series, Iron Man and Namor in The Marvel Super Heroes, Thunderbolt Ross in The Incredible Hulk, Shao Kahn in Mortal Kombat: Defenders of the Realm, Prosecutor in Heavy Metal, the title character in Wildfire, Warden Toadblatt in The Grim Adventures of Billy & Mandy, Nohrin Judge in Delgo, Doctor Strange in the Spider-Man episode of the same name, Principal Dinkler in the Duckman episode "From Brad to Worse"), dies at age 72.
- February 4: Ossie Davis, American actor, director, writer, and activist (voice of Yar in Dinosaur), dies at age 87.
- February 17: Dan O'Herlihy, Irish actor (voice of Grant Walker in the Batman: The Animated Series episode "Deep Freeze", additional voices in The Pirates of Dark Water), dies at age 85.
- February 28: Pam Carter, American voice actor (voice of Lena Mack in Street Sharks, Mrs. Andrews in Archie's Weird Mysteries, Sea Beast in Strawberry Shortcake, additional voices in Liberty's Kids) and voice director (DIC Entertainment), dies at age 50.

=== March ===
- March 5: Vance Gerry, American storyboard artist, concept artist, and character designer (Walt Disney Animation Studios), dies at age 75.
- March 10: Debbi Besserglick, Israeli actress (dub voice of Arthur Read), dies at age 49.
- March 13: Hal Seeger, American animator, comics writer and comics artist (Fleischer Studios, Batfink, Milton the Monster), dies at age 87.

=== April ===
- April 11: John Bennett, English actor (voice of Captain Holly in Watership Down, Don in The Plague Dogs), dies at age 76.
- April 21: Bob Gardiner, American animator (co-director of Closed Mondays) and inventor (Claymation), dies at age 54.
- April 22: Paul Beard, American animator (Blue's Clues, Blue's Room, Wonder Pets!), dies at age 27.
- April 23: Romano Scarpa, Italian comics artist, writer and animator (La piccola fiammiferaia), dies at age 77.
- April 26: Mason Adams, American actor (voice of The Cat in the Hat in The Grinch Grinches the Cat in the Hat, Grandpa in Raggedy Ann & Andy: A Musical Adventure, Narrator in the CBS Storybreak episode "Arnold of the Ducks"), dies at age 86.

=== May ===
- May 6: Joe Grant, American animator, character designer and screenwriter (Walt Disney Company), dies at age 96.
- May 9: Chris Kreski, American writer, biographer and screenwriter (Beavis and Butt-Head, Celebrity Deathmatch), dies at age 42.
- May 19: Henry Corden, American actor (voice of Paw Rugg in The Hillbilly Bears, Ookla the Mok in Thundarr the Barbarian, continued voice of Fred Flintstone), dies at 85.
- May 17: Frank Gorshin, American actor, impressionist, and comedian (voice of Daffy Duck in Superior Duck, Foghorn Leghorn in Pullet Surprise, Yosemite Sam in From Hare to Eternity, Sir 1023 and Quart in Rudolph's Shiny New Year, Hugo Strange in The Batman, The Reverend Jack Cheese in The Ren & Stimpy Show episode of the same name, Barney Stone and Clovy in the Johnny Bravo episode "Blarney Buddies"), dies at age 72.
- May 21: Howard Morris, American actor (voice of Gopher in Winnie the Pooh and the Honey Tree and Winnie the Pooh and the Blustery Day, the title characters in Atom Ant and Munro, Mr. Peebles in Magilla Gorilla, Jughead Jones in The Archies, Professor Icenstein and Luigi La Bounci in Galaxy High, Flem in Cow & Chicken), dies at age 85.
- May 22: Thurl Ravenscroft, American actor and singer (voice of Monstro the Whale in Pinocchio, the alligator in Lady and the Tramp, Tony the Tiger in the animated ads, Paul Bunyan in Paul Bunyan, Captain in One Hundred and One Dalmatians, singer of You're A Mean One, Mr. Grinch in How the Grinch Stole Christmas!, Billy Bass in The Aristocats, Kirby in The Brave Little Toaster), dies at age 91.

=== June ===
- June 6: Anne Bancroft, American actress (voice of Queen Ant in Antz, Empress Sedessa in Delgo, Dr. Zweig in The Simpsons episode "Fear of Flying"), dies from uterine cancer at age 73.
- June 11: David Lehner, American music composer (composed the theme song of The Life and Times of Juniper Lee with his brother Rob), dies at 21.
- June 14:
  - Robie Lester, American actress (voice of Miss Jessica in Santa Claus Is Comin' to Town, singing voice for Eva Gabor in The Aristocats and The Rescuers), dies at age 80.
  - Barrington Bunce, English-born American animator (Hanna-Barbera, Spider-Woman, Ruby-Spears Enterprises, Garbage Pail Kids, The Simpsons), storyboard artist (Dink, the Little Dinosaur, Marvel Productions, Hanna-Barbera, Wild West C.O.W.-Boys of Moo Mesa, Red Planet, Freakazoid!, Adventures in Odyssey, Nickelodeon Animation Studio, Butt Ugly Martians, Make Way for Noddy, Danger Rangers), character designer (ChalkZone) and art director (Alvin and the Chipmunks), dies at age 60.
- June 19: Selby Kelly, American comic artist and animator (Walt Disney Animation, Warner Bros. Animation Studios, MGM Animation, Walter Lantz, George Pal's Puppetoons, Hanna-Barbera, Jay Ward, Bill Melendez, Chuck Jones), dies at age 87.
- June 24: Paul Winchell, American ventriloquist and actor (voice of Tigger in Winnie the Pooh, Dick Dastardly in Wacky Races and Dastardly and Muttley in Their Flying Machines, Shun Gon in The Aristocats, Gargamel in The Smurfs, Boomer in The Fox and the Hound, Zummi Gummi in Disney's Adventures of the Gummi Bears), dies at age 82.
- June 25: John Fiedler, American actor (voice of Piglet in Winnie the Pooh, Father Sexton in Robin Hood, Porcupine in The Fox and the Hound, Rudy in The Emperor's New Groove), dies at age 80.

=== July ===
- July 2: Norm Prescott, American animation producer (co-founder of Filmation), dies at age 78.
- July 11: Frances Langford, American singer (sang the Once Upon a Wintertime segment in Melody Time), dies at age 92.
- July 20: James Doohan, Canadian actor (voice of Scotty in Star Trek: The Animated Series), dies at age 85.
- July 21: Long John Baldry, English-Canadian singer and actor (voice of Dr. Robotnik in Adventures of Sonic the Hedgehog, Mistle Toad in Toad Patrol, Komplex in Bucky O'Hare and the Toad Wars), dies at age 64.
- July 26: James O'Brien, American animator (The Simpsons), dies at age 33.
- July 27: Marten Toonder, Dutch comics artist and animator (Toonder Animation), Als Je Begrijpt Wat Ik Bedoel (The Dragon That Wasn't (Or Was He?)), dies at age 93.

=== August ===
- August 1: Wim Boost, aka Wibo, Dutch comics artist, cartoonist and animator, dies at age 87.
- August 2: Loulie Jean Norman, American coloratura soprano singer (voice of Penelope Pinfeather in Melody and Toot, Whistle, Plunk and Boom), dies at age 92.
- August 9: Nikolay Serebryakov, Soviet and Russian director of animated films dies at age 76.
- August 16: Joe Ranft, American screenwriter, animator, and voice actor (Walt Disney Animation Studios, Pixar), dies at age 45.
- August 23: Brock Peters, American actor (voice of General Newcastle in Challenge of the GoBots, Tormack in Galtar and the Golden Lance, Boneyard in Gravedale High, Bloth in The Pirates of Dark Water, Lucius Fox in Batman: The Animated Series, Dark Kat in SWAT Kats: The Radical Squadron, Jomo in The Wild Thornberrys, Usula in The Legend of Tarzan, Chronos in the Johnny Bravo episode "Bearly Enough Time!", Morris Grant / Soul Power in the Static Shock episode "Blast from the Past"), dies at age 78.

=== September ===
- September 2: Bob Denver, American actor (voice of Gilligan in The New Adventures of Gilligan and Gilligan's Planet, himself in The Simpsons episode "Simpson Tide"), dies from pneumonia at age 70.
- September 10: Carlos Costantini, Argentine comic artist and animator (Doña Tele, Barbeta y Grunchi, Mac Perro), dies at age 69.
- September 24: Tommy Bond, American actor (voice of Beans in Looney Tunes, speaking voice of Owl Jolson in I Love to Singa), dies at age 79.
- September 25: Don Adams, American actor and comedian (voice of Tennessee Tuxedo in Tennessee Tuxedo and His Tales, the title character in Inspector Gadget, Gadget Boy in Gadget Boy & Heather, Principal Hickey in Pepper Ann, voiced himself in The New Scooby-Doo Movies episode "The Exterminator"), dies from lymphoma at age 82.

=== October ===
- October 2: Hamilton Camp, English actor (voice of Gizmoduck in DuckTales, Greedy and Harmony Smurf in The Smurfs, Professor Moriarty in Sherlock Hound, young Barney Rubble in The Flintstone Kids, Dracula in Scooby-Doo! and the Reluctant Werewolf, Professor Chromedome in The Tick, Merlin in House of Mouse), dies at age 70.
- October 7: Charles Rocket, American actor, comedian, musician and television news reporter (voice of Leo Lionheart Jr. in MGM sing-along videos, Firrikash in Titan A.E., Mission Control 1961 in Fly Me to the Moon, narrator in Yu-Gi-Oh! The Movie: Pyramid of Light, Frederick Fournier in The New Batman Adventures episode "Mean Seasons", Oil Slick Monster in The Adventures of Hyperman episode "Oceans a Leavin'", Crewcut in the Static Shock episode "She-Bang"), commits suicide at age 56.
- October 16: Elmer Dresslar Jr., American actor (voice of the Jolly Green Giant), dies at age 80.
- October 20: Eva Švankmajerová, Czech painter, ceramist, poet, animator, designer, director and producer, and wife of Jan Švankmajer, dies at age 65.
- October 29: Lloyd Bochner, Canadian actor (voice of Hamilton Hill in Batman: The Animated Series and The New Batman Adventures), dies at age 81.

=== November ===
- November 5: Derek Lamb, English animator and film producer (Special Delivery, Every Child, Mystery!, Sports Cartoons, Sesame Street), dies at age 69.
- November 7: Harry Thompson, English radio and TV producer, comedy writer, novelist and TV writer (co-creator of Monkey Dust), dies at age 45 from cancer.
- November 11: Keith Andes, American actor (voice of Birdman in Birdman and the Galaxy Trio), dies at age 85.
- November 24: Pat Morita, Japanese-American actor and comedian (voice of Mr. Miyagi in the opening narration of The Karate Kid, The Emperor of China in Mulan and Mulan II, King Makahana in the Happily Ever After: Fairy Tales for Every Child episode "Puss in Boots", Mr. Straw in the Adventures from the Book of Virtues episode "Charity", Master Udon in the SpongeBob SquarePants episode "Karate Island", himself in the Robot Chicken episode "S&M Present"), dies from kidney failure at age 73.
- November 26: Stan Berenstain, American author and illustrator (co-creator of The Berenstain Bears), dies from cancer at age 82.
- November 28: Miroslav Štěpánek, Czech animator, film director, sculptor, screenwriter, illustrator and graphic designer (Pojďte pane, budeme si hrát, aka Hey Mister, Let's Play!), dies at age 81.

=== December ===
- December 22: Aurora Miranda, Brazilian singer and actress (sang and danced with Donald Duck and Jose Carioca in The Three Caballeros), dies at age 90.
- December 26: Vincent Schiavelli, American actor (voice of Mr. Bailey and Pigeon Man in Hey Arnold!, Zatara in the Batman: The Animated Series episode "Zatanna"), dies from lung cancer at age 57.

== See also ==
- 2005 in anime
