= John Coven =

American storyboard artist

- Born: August 27, 1958 (age 67); New York City
- Citizenship: United States
- Education: College of William & Mary (BA)
- Occupations: Storyboard artist, art professor
- Years active: 1987–present
- Employer(s): Walt Disney Studios, Paramount Pictures, Universal Studios
- Known for: X-Men, The Lion King, Captain America: Civil War

John Leslie Coven (born August 27, 1958) is an American storyboard artist, film director, educator and the author of several comics and children's picture books. He is currently the director of the department of animated film at the Gobelins School of the Image in Paris, France.

== Career ==
Coven graduated in 1980 from The College of William and Mary in Virginia with a Bachelor of Science and from the École Nationale des Arts Décoratifs in Strasbourg, France with a diploma in illustration. He began writing and illustrating children's books while completing his studies. His first book was published in France by Galllimard.

His career as a storyboard artist started in Hollywood in the 1990s and spans more than three decades and includes over 80 feature films such as the blockbusters The Lion King, Jurassic World, Venom, Logan, Captain America: Civil War, and the X-Men.

In 1995, Coven became a member of the Art Directors Guild, and began teaching storyboarding, illustration and filmmaking in various Art Schools around the world such as the Art Center College of Design in Pasadena, the Otis College of Art and Design in Los Angeles, the École Émile-Cohl and the Atelier de Sèvres in France as well as animation schools such as the Gobelins School of the Image in Paris, France and The Animation Workshop in Denmark.

In 2022, Coven became a member of the Academy of Motion Picture Arts and Sciences; in the same year, he was appointed director of the department of animated film at Gobelins School of the Image in Paris, France.

== Filmography (selected) ==
=== Storyboard Artist ===
| Year | Title | Role | Production company |
|---|---|---|---|
| 1992 | Candyman | Illustrator | Propaganda Films |
| 1994 | Reality Bites | Storyboard artist | Jersey Films |
| 1995 | The Usual Suspects | Storyboard artist | PolyGram Filmed Entertainment |
| 1998 | Apt Pupil | Storyboard artist | TriStar Pictures, Phoenix Pictures, Bad Hat Harry |
| 1999 | Stir of Echoes | Storyboard artist | Artisan Entertainment |
| 2000 | The Million Dollar Hotel | Storyboard artist | Icon Productions, Road Movies |
| 2000 | X-Men | Storyboard artist | Marvel Enterprises |
| 2004 | 13 Going on 30 | Storyboard artist | Columbia Pictures, Revolution Studios |
| 2005 | Walk the Line | Storyboard artist | Fox 2000 Pictures |
| 2006 | Stick It | Storyboard artist | Touchstone Pictures, Spyglass Entertainment |
| 2009 | I Love You Philip Morris | Storyboard artist | EuropaCorp, Mad Chance Productions |
| 2009 | The Men Who Stare at Goats | Storyboard artist | Winchester Capital Partners, BBC Films, Smokehouse Pictures |
| 2011 | The Green Hornet | Storyboard artist | Columbia Pictures, Original Film |
| 2011 | Crazy, Stupid, Love.''" | Storyboard artist | Carousel Productions, Di Novi Pictures |
| 2013 | The Wolverine | Storyboard artist | Marvel Entertainment |
| 2014 | Godzilla | Storyboard artist | Legendary Pictures |
| 2015 | Jurassic World | Storyboard artist | Amblin Entertainment, Legendary Pictures, The Kennedy/Marshall Pictures |
| 2016 | Capitain America: Civil War | Storyboard artist | Marvel Studios |
| 2016 | Alice Through the Looking Glass | Storyboard artist | Walt Disney Pictures |
| 2017 | Logan | Storyboard artist | 20th Century Fox, Marvel Entertainment |
| 2017 | Godless (TV mini series) | storyboard artist (6 episodes) | Casey Silver Productions |
| 2018 | Smallfoot | Storyboard artist | Warner Animation Group |
| 2018 | Venom | Storyboard artist | Columbia Pictures, Marvel Entertainment |
| 2019 | X-Men: Dark Phoenix | Storyboard artist | 20th Century Fox, Marvel Entertainment |
| 2019 | The Lion King | Storyboard artist | Walt Disney Pictures |
| 2019 | Charlie's Angels | Storyboard artist | Columbia Pictures |
| 2019 | Jumanji: The Next Level | Storyboard artist | Columbia Pictures |
| 2022 | Chip 'n Dale: Rescue Rangers | Storyboard artist | Walt Disney Pictures |
| 2023 | The Little Mermaid | Storyboard artist | Walt Disney Pictures |
| 2024 | Mufasa: The Lion King | Head of story | Walt Disney Pictures |

=== Other ===
| Year | Title | Format | Role |
|---|---|---|---|
| 1995 | Night Train | Short film | Director, writer |
| 2001 | Out There | Short film | Director, writer, producer |
| 2002 | Repossessed | Short film | Director, writer |
| 2002 | Talk 5.0 | Short film | Director, writer |
| 2001 | Drum Solo | Short film | co-producer |
| 2004 | Game Box 1.0 | Feature film | co-executive producer |
| 2004 | On the Run | Short film | producer |
| 2004 | Lost | Feature film | voice actor |

== Bibliography ==
=== Children's Books ===
| Title | Year of first publication | First edition publisher | Role |
|---|---|---|---|
| Treasure Island | 1990 | Balburry Publishing | Illustrator |
| L’Autre Moitié | 1989 | Gallimard Publishing, Paris | Author, Illustrator |
| A Tail of Two Cities | 1987 | Balburry Publishing | Illustrator |

=== Comics ===
| Title | Year of first publication | First edition publisher | Role |
|---|---|---|---|
| Le Nouveau Spectacle | 2009 | Spirou Magazine | Author, Illustrator |
| Pas Le Genre | 1995 | Fluide Glacial Magazine | Author, Illustrator |
