= Pierre Perifel =

French filmmaker

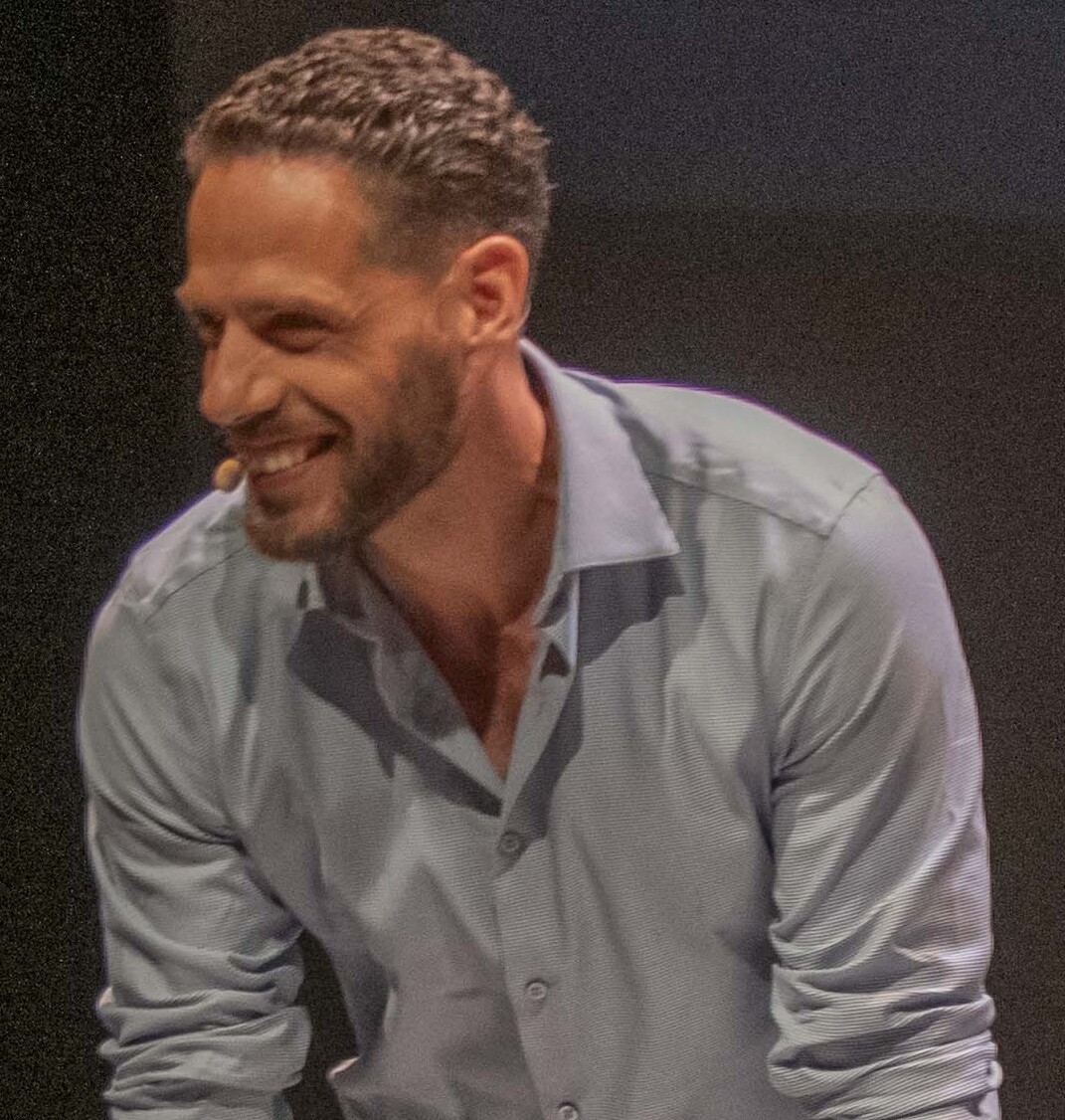
- Perifel at the 2025 Annecy International Animation Film Festival
- Born: 1980–81 (age 44-45); Lyon, France
- Occupations: Filmmaker; animator
- Years active: 2004–present
- Employer: DreamWorks Animation (2008–present)

Pierre Perifel is a French filmmaker and animator. He is best known for his work at DreamWorks Animation, including directing the short film Bilby (2018) and the feature films The Bad Guys (2022) and its sequel The Bad Guys 2 (2025).

== Early life and education ==
Perifel was born in Lyon, France. His passion for animation began in high school. In his third year of attending École Émile-Cohl art school, he applied to Gobelins, l'École de l'image and was accepted.

In 2004, Perifel created the short student film A Swell Plan, and collaborated with classmates Xavier Ramonède, Jun Frederic Violet, and Rémi Zaarour on a second short film, Festival Qualité. He graduated from Gobelins in 2005. For his thesis film, Le Building, he reteamed with Ramonède and Zaarour, and also worked with Marco Nguyen and Olivier Staphylas. The film uses a combination of 2D and 3D animation. Le Building screened at numerous international film festivals and won several awards, including Best Undergraduate Animation at the Ottawa International Animation Festival.

== Career ==
The earliest films of Perifel's career include Curious George, Nocturna, Go West! A Lucky Luke Adventure and The Illusionist. The same year as his graduation from Gobelins, Perifel served as a supervising animator on the French short film Imago, which was directed by Cédric Babouche. Imago afforded Perifel the opportunity to work with Ramonède again.

Perifel moved to the United States in 2008 and began his career at DreamWorks Animation doing character animation on the 2D short film, Secrets of the Furious Five, for which he won an Annie Award. Following that, Perifel transitioned to CGI, working on Monsters vs. Aliens for about two months. He then joined onto Shrek Forever After. He returned to 2D animation with a few sequences in Kung Fu Panda 2. On that film, he also served as lead animator for the character Lord Shen. Perifel has said that he "was in charge of [the character]", even though he "didn't have a team of animators".

Perifel was officially promoted to supervising animator on Rise of the Guardians leading the team responsible for the character North. Both Kung Fu Panda 2 and Rise of the Guardians earned Perifel Annie Award nominations.

Perifel's subsequently was appointed Head of Animation on several films including Monkeys of Mumbai and Larrikins that never got to see the light of day for various reasons.

In November 2017, it was announced that Perifel has been developing an untitled short film with Liron Topaz and JP Sans. The film was selected through the DreamWorks Shorts program, which was set up by Chris DeFaria, after he became president of the DreamWorks Animation Film Group in January 2017. Bilby opened at the closing ceremony of the Annecy International Animated Film Festival 2018. It screened in many festivals and won the Jury Choice Award at Siggraph 2018.

Perifel made his feature directorial debut, directing the animated feature film adaptation of the original Aaron Blabey/Scholastic book series, The Bad Guys. It was released theatrically in the United States on 22 April 2022. He returned to direct the sequel to The Bad Guys, which was released theatrically in the US on 1 August 2025.

== Filmography ==
=== Feature films ===
==== Director ====
- The Bad Guys (2022)
- The Bad Guys 2 (2025)

=== Short films ===
==== Director ====
- Le Building (2005)
- Bilby (2018)
