= Gobelins, l'école de l'image =

School of visual communication and arts in Paris, France

Coordinates: 48°50′13″N 2°21′13″E

Gobelins Paris
- Established: 1963
- Director: Erik Anspach
- Location: Paris, France
- Campus: Urban
- Website: www.gobelins-school.com

Gobelins, l'école de l'image (French: Gobelins Imagery School) also known as Gobelins Paris is a school of visual communication and arts in Paris, France, with its main location near the Latin Quarter. A consular school funded by the Paris Chamber of Commerce and Industry, it provides several programs at a range of fees.

It is best known for the Cinéma Department of Animation, founded in 1975 by Pierre Ayma. Its former students include many strip cartoonists and animation artists such as Didier Cassegrain, Cromwell, Yacine Elghorri, Jean-François Miniac, and Pierre Coffin. The faculty includes Michel Bouvet. The Animation Department is currently directed by American storyboard artist and director John Coven.

Over the years, Gobelins has introduced major innovations in multimedia content, developing products for the web, CD-ROM, Interactive DVD, and public installations. The video department, created by Daniel Boullay and Guy Chevalier for the training of adult students, has since 1985 been prominent in the French technical audiovisual landscape. Led by Daniel Desmoulins, the video department allows professionals to create or analyze techniques, keeping current with the rapid evolution of industry technologies. Gobelins also offers instruction in photography and graphic design.

== Notable alumni ==
- Pascal Charrue, co-founder of Fortiche, the studio behind Arcane (TV series)
- Virginie Augustin, comic book artist
- Pierre Coffin, director of Despicable Me
- Bibo Bergeron, director of A Monster in Paris, The Road to El Dorado and Shark Tale
- Kristof Serrand, supervising animator at DreamWorks Animation
- Marion Montaigne, author of Tu mourras moins bête...
- Bastien Vivès, co-creator of Lastman
- Olivier Grunewald, photographer
- Riad Sattouf, creator of The Arab of the Future
- Yves Bigerel, co-creator of Lastman
- Olivier Cotte, animation historian
- Rikke Asbjoern, co-creator of Pinky Malinky
- Violaine Briat, storyboard artist on The Loud House
- Bertrand Mandico, film director
- Lucrèce Andreae, film director
- Simon Otto, head of character animation at DreamWorks Animation
- Thomas Romain, co-creator of Code Lyoko and co-producer of Ōban Star-Racers
- Pierre Perifel, director of The Bad Guys

== Notable student films ==
- Le Building (2005) - by Marco Nguyen, Pierre Perifel, Xavier Ramonède, Olivier Staphylas, and Rémi Zaarour
- Oktapodi (2007) - by Julien Bocabeille, François-Xavier Chanioux, Olivier Delabarre, Thierry Marchand, Quentin Marmier, and Emud Mokhberi
- Louise (2021) - by Constance Bertoux, Camille Bozec, Pauline Guitton, Pauline Mauviere, and Mila Monaghan
- Last Summer (2022) - by Nicola Bernardi, Alessandra De Stefano, Chloé Van Becelaere, Camille Van Delft, and Elodie Xia
