= Le Building =

- Directed by: Marco Nguyen; Pierre Perifel; Xavier Ramonède; Olivier Staphylas; Rémi Zaarour
- Written by: Marco Nguyen; Pierre Perifel; Xavier Ramonède; Olivier Staphylas; Rémi Zaarour
- Starring: Manu Nabajoth
- Music by: Olivier Crouet
- Production company: Gobelins, l'École de l'image.
- Release date: 2005
- Running time: 1 minute
- Country: France

Le Building is a 2005 French animated short film directed by a team of final year students at Gobelins, l'École de l'image. The story depicts a series of slapstick accidents that cause destruction to a three-story apartment complex. Le Building's team of five directors is composed of Pierre Perifel and Olivier Staphylas, both of whom went on to become Annie Award-recognized animators at DreamWorks, Xavier Ramonède and Annie award-nominated Marco Nguyen, who have continued their careers with animation credits on various high-profile French productions, and Rémi Zaarour, who has since become a comic book artist, published under the pseudonym Pozla.

Produced as a group thesis film, Le Building was first shown as an opener at the Annecy International Animation Film Festival. It has since gone on to screen at numerous other festivals internationally. Shortly after the film's May 2005 premiere, it was released online, and in early 2006, it secured a TV distribution deal in France. The film has been included in limited edition DVD releases associated with various film festivals. It has also received multiple releases through DVD magazines and video podcasts.

Le Building has garnered positive attention from both critics and animation professionals. Most comments have praised the film's humor, as well as its blending of 2D and 3D animation. Le Building has been honored with several awards, including Best Undergraduate Animation at the Ottawa International Animation Festival, and has often been cited as one of Gobelins' best student works.

== Plot ==
Inside a crooked, brick apartment complex, a burly man, with a Russian military uniform hanging on his wall, showers, while belting out a song in his native tongue. A short, elderly woman in the apartment next door finds this to be a nuisance. She rouses from her chair and knocks on the wall between their two rooms. Her knocking causes a porcelain dolphin figurine to fall to the ground and shatter. This startles her cat, who then jumps from their third story window sill. The cat lands on a clothes rack underneath and bounces onto the helmet of an oncoming motorcyclist.

Gripping onto the helmet for its life, the cat causes the motorcyclist – en route on a pizza delivery – to swerve uncontrollably in the road. A bus barely misses hitting them – and then collides into a nearby parking meter. The motorcyclist, unable to stop, inadvertently drives into the apartment complex. Crashing up the stairs, his vehicle comes to a sudden halt on the second floor, sending a small pizza through the mail slot of a closed door. A naked, obese woman steps out of her bathtub and slips on the pizza. She grabs hold of a shelf above her, but the shelf breaks. A radio that had been perched on the shelf is catapulted through an open window and hits a crane operator in the face.

Upon collision, the crane operator passes out. Crumpling forward onto the crane's control panel, the operator unconsciously pushes two levers forward - as a result, the crane rotates. A giant magnet suspended by a wire from the crane attaches itself to the parked bus. As the bus driver stands outside in the road with his back turned, his vehicle is carried away. The Russian man, still singing, notices the bus hurtling towards his window. He lets out a startled scream. The old woman, still pounding against the wall, hears a loud crash. She mutters irritably, and with a "hmph", walks back to her chair. Outside, the bus continues circling through the air, the screaming Russian man plastered against its window. The building has almost entirely been destroyed. A single beam holds up the old woman's room – she presumably remains oblivious to the catastrophe outside.

== Production ==
Le Building was directed as a student project at Gobelins, l'École de l'image. During their final year, members of the animation program at this prestigious Parisian university form six groups in which to create their thesis films. As an annual tradition, the nearby Annecy International Animation Film Festival features the completed works of these students as opening short films – one on each day of the festival. Le Building was created for the 2005 festival by Marco Nguyen, Pierre Perifel, Xavier Ramonède, Olivier Staphylas, and Rémi Zaarour. It was in 2005 that computer animation first became a required course of study at Gobelins, and Le Building holds the distinction of being among the first openers at Annecy to use this technique.

Wanting their film to suit its placement as a festival opener, the team of students behind Le Building felt compelled to take it in a humorous and "punchy" direction. Settling on a storyline that all five of them could agree on was described as the most difficult aspect of production. Ultimately, the filmmakers determined to focus on a "simple idea" that would spawn a "crazy chain reaction". After six weeks of collaborating, they had finalized their script and storyboard. Including this early brainstorming process, Le Building's production schedule lasted four-and-a-half months, spanning December 2004 through April 2005.

Several commentators argued that Le Building's use of CGI – such as the Pizza Boy character, seen here in a behind the scenes making of video – is seamlessly blended with the film's traditionally animated elements.

All five directors contributed to the initial design work and then shared out subsequent responsibilities. Most of the film was traditionally animated, and most of the work in this medium was done by Perifel, Ramonède, and Zaarour. A previous collaboration between these three classmates had been exhibited at Annecy one year earlier, in the form of a thirty-second bumper, called Festival Qualité. Staphylas, who had transferred directly into the university's final year, supervised the computer animation. He had previously graduated from Supinfocom university, in Valenciennes, and had also worked on the music video for Madonna's "Love Profusion". Using Maya software, Staphylas strived to achieve a look that would match the traditionally animated portions of the film. Nguyen distributed his efforts between both disciplines, assisting Staphylas with some of the CG work, while also at times playing the role of traditional animator.

The final character designs were developed by Zaarour. He went on to review all of the CG work, so as to ensure that his style was being properly translated between mediums. Traditionally animated backgrounds were sketched and painted by Perifel, with assistance from Zaarour, and a computer-animated background was created by Nguyen. Most of the traditional animation was colored by Ramonède, who also held primary responsibility for the compositing.

The old woman and the Russian singer are both traditionally animated. The first scene with the old woman was animated by Ramonède, while the final scene with the character was animated by Perifel. The Russian singer was animated by Nguyen, in the scene when the character is approached by an oncoming bus. The bus itself is computer-animated, as are the demolition crane (by Nguyen) and the pizza boy (by Staphylas). The cat was animated by Zaarour, using Flash animation. In order to match the frame rate of Staphylas' CG work in this scene, Zaarour animated the cat at 25 frames per second.

In addition to Maya 6 and Macromedia Flash MX2004, other programs used in the film's production were Adobe After Effects 6.5, Adobe Photoshop CS, Pro Tools, Mental Ray (for Maya), and Crater Software CTP. The sound design was done by Olivier Crouet, using Logic Audio. Crouet also composed the music. The sole vocal performance in the film was provided by Manu Nabajoth.

== Release ==
The film's world premiere, as an opener at the Annecy International Animation Film Festival, occurred on May 10, 2005. By late June, Le Building had been made available to view online, (Note: A roughly two-and-a-half minute "making of" video was also released online.) and in October it won the Audience Award at the 2004–2005 Webcuts Internet Film Festival. Webcuts subsequently released the film on DVD, along with other selections from that festival, as part of a limited edition compilation. Only 250 copies of this release were ever made.

Earlier that year, on September 17, the film had an American screening in Wilmington, North Carolina's non-competitive Port City Animation Festival. On December 8, the filmmakers were featured speakers at the Profile Intermedia Design Festival in Bremen, Germany. Additional screenings that year took place in São Paulo, Brazil's Anima Mundi festival and Vilnius, Lithuania's Tindirindis festival. In the final months of 2005, the film was distributed through issues of the DVD magazines Stash (#15) and XFUNS (#21), as well as through Channel Frederator's fifth video podcast. Channel Frederator included a short bumper after the film, which read, "That naked lady requested you call her...Please. Don't play games with her heart." This brief quip was accompanied by the company's own phone number.

According to the official website for Le Building, French TV channel Canal+ purchased rights to the film in January 2006. The film continued to screen at various international festivals throughout that year as well, including Future Film Festival in Bologna, Italy, Animex in Middlesbrough, England, Animafest Zagreb in Croatia, SIGGRAPH, held that year in Boston, Massachusetts, Russia's multi-city KROK International Animated Films Festival, held on the cruise ship Marshall Zhukov, and Encounters Short Film and Animation Festival in Bristol, England. At that year's Annecy festival, an organization called Café Creed sold a limited edition DVD compilation of short films called The Increedible Choco-Show, which included Le Building among its selections. By the time Le Building won in the Undergraduate category at the Ottawa International Animation Festival in September, Eric Homan of Frederator Studios commented in response, "I feel everyone and his mom has seen this short by now." Le Building went on to win Best Foreign Film at Frederator's own awards ceremony in early 2007 and was subsequently re-released by the studio in an Awards-edition of its video podcast (episode 2). The film was also re-released by Stash – that September, issue #37 of the DVD magazine contained a special bonus disc commemorating staff favorites from the early issues of its publication. In 2007, the film screened at Trickfilmfestival Stuttgart in Stuttgart, Germany.

=== Critical reception ===
Shortly after Le Building's premiere at Annecy, Amid Amidi ran a glowing profile of the film on Cartoon Brew. Amidi used the film as an argument against the perceived decline of 2D animation, claiming that the student work of Gobelins as a whole is "probably the slickest and most technically proficient of any animation school" he had ever seen. Multiple times over the following years, Amidi would call back on Le Building as exemplary of the work being produced at Gobelins.

In conjunction with the 2006 Siggraph conference, Animation Magazine ran an article by Ramin Zahed, noting that Le Building – which was screening at that year's event – had "already generated good word of mouth". Terrence Masson, then serving as Siggraph's Computer Animation Festival Chair, commented that the films of Gobelins were among the best submitted to him that year. He remarked that European students overall were turning out work better than their American counterparts. Similar claims were made by Christopher Panzer, in an article that year for Animation World Network. In his article – illustrated with an image from Le Building – Panzer called the work of European animation students "better than pro" and wrote that these students were "raising the bar for professionals worldwide."

Multiple figures have remarked positively upon Le Building's combined use of 2D and 3D animation methods. Eric Riewer, who once served as the head of Gobelins' animation department, wrote in 2010 that he "continue[d] to admire this film for its hybrid form". In a review for the website Drawn!, professional animator Ward Jenkins (Note: Through his affiliation with an animation studio known as Primal Screen, Jenkins has had work shown on Cartoon Network, Nickelodeon, HGTV, TNT, and PBS Kids.) praised Le Building's "excellent integration of traditional and CG animation". He felt it necessary to note, "Yes, the pizza boy is completely CG" – a fact that had escaped Amidi (of Cartoon Brew) on first viewing. Upon gaining this knowledge, Amidi's response was enthusiastic: "All I can say is WOW!"

Another professional animator, Peter J. Richardson, (Note: Richardson created the animation for David Sington's 2011 film, The Flaw.) wrote that achieving the film's visual blend relied on a "very delicate balance". Masking CG to look more like 2D animation, he explained, typically relies on a technique known as cell shading – he continued however, that cell shading is not sufficient to hide the distinct movement of 3D objects. According to Richardson, the filmmakers addressed this issue through careful orchestration of the film's pacing. He explained, " If everything's moving crazy fast, it's harder to tell if a shape was hand-drawn or not...When the cat lands on the biker in Le Building, the 3D kicks in, and it all feels appropriately wobbly and unstable." Richardson then wrote that he had rarely seen 3D movement animated this well and proclaimed the film as a whole, "excellent in every respect."

Stash DVD magazine called Le Building "a manic and charming tale" and predicted that the film would be sure to open up myriad opportunities for its directors. When Le Building won in the Undergraduate category at the Ottawa International Animation Festival, Richard J. Leskosky of The News-Gazette wrote that all of the student films honored at the festival that year "already looked quite professional". In his review, Leskosky wrote that Le Building is "very much in the spirit of Rube Goldberg's wacky inventions". The Ottawa festival's jury also made a comparison to Goldberg's work, and in 3D World magazine, Le Building's style was likened to that of Chuck Jones. 3D World called Le Building "a gleefully madcap short" and named it one of the ten best student animated films of the year.

In a review for the Colombian publication FuriaMag, Juan David Gómez praised the film's animation, characters, and story. "Le Building is one of those wonders that it's nice to meet from time to time on the internet", he wrote. The multi-national, Spanish-language publication Blog de Cine also praised the film, writing that it "lasts just long enough" to have a joyous effect on viewers.

=== Accolades ===
Year	Award	Category	Result	Ref
2006	3D World – Movers and Shakers	Ten Best Student Animations of the Year	Included	
2006	Animation Magazine – World Animation Celebration	First Quarter Competition	Won	
2006	Animation World Network – Hot Spots Showcase	Stash DVD Magazine – Best of the Best	Included	
2006	Animex International Festival of Animation and Computer Games	2D Computer Animation Award	Runner-Up	
2006	Animex International Festival of Animation and Computer Games	Audience Award	Nominated	
2007	Channel Frederator Awards	Best Foreign Film	Won	
2006	Ottawa International Animation Festival	Undergraduate Animation	Won	
2005	Webcuts Internet Film Festival	Audience Award	Won	

== Aftermath ==
Upon graduating from Gobelins, Perifel and Staphylas both received job offers from DreamWorks Animation. Looking back on their university's "end-of-year jury day", Staphylas said, "I was stressed because I knew that a lot of industry professionals would be there...I was in the corridor waiting for the announcement of my results and I see Shelley Page, the European representative of Dreamworks Animation. She walks up to me and gives me her business card and tells me she'll call me tomorrow." Within a year, Staphylas had left for the United States. He would eventually be followed by Perifel, and since then, both have taken on senior positions at DreamWorks. (Note: Perifel and Staphylas have both received Annie Award nominations for their work at DreamWorks. Perifel won in 2009 for Secrets of the Furious Five.)

Initially, Perifel turned down the offer from DreamWorks, realizing that there would be few opportunities to work on traditionally animated projects in the US. While still in France, Perifel, along with Ramonède, worked on Nocturna and The Illusionist. Among Ramonède's other credits is the French webseries Les Kassos. Nguyen served as an animation director on The Rabbi's Cat and as a character animator on The Big Bad Fox & Other Tales. (Note: Nguyen earned an Annie Award nomination in 2017 for his work on The Big Bad Fox & Other Tales.) He has also continued to direct short animated projects, while Zaarour has created his own comic books under the pseudonym Pozla.

Le Building has continued to receive screenings, retrospectively, at such film festivals and events as the 2010 Anirmau festival in Lalín, Spain, the 2010 Animatricks festival in Helsinki, Finland, the 2011 Animation Lab at the Hong Kong Arts Centre in China, the 2015 Anima Mundi festival in São Paulo, Brazil, the 2015 Monstra festival in Lisbon, Portugal, and the 2016 Animage Festival in Recife, Brazil.

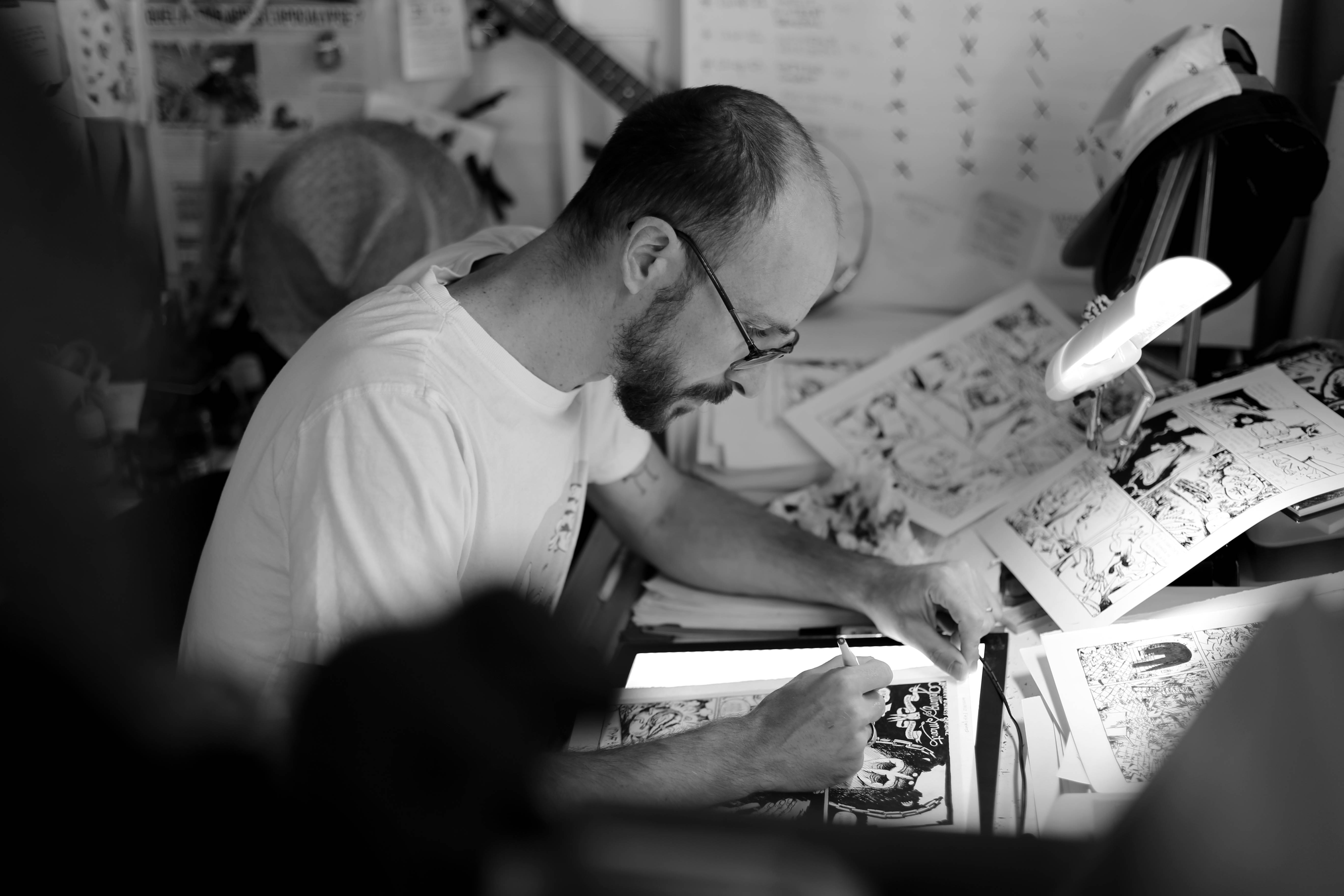
Le Building co-director, Rémi Zaarour, who finalized the film's character designs, went on to gain fame as the comic book artist known as Pozla.

== Legacy ==
The awards-based recognition that Le Building received drew approval from various publications. The film's triumph at Ottawa was applauded by Jenkins (of the website Drawn!), who took the occasion to voice his admiration of the film's humor and visuals, as well as by Eric Homan of Frederator Studios. Homan commented that even as Le Building became ubiquitous within his circles, he had never tired of the film. The Frederator staff would shortly go on to honor Le Building with Best Foreign Film in their own awards ceremony, claiming, "This film's got it all." When Le Building found success as the first quarterly winner in Animation Magazine's World Animation Celebration Online competition, Ryan Ball congratulated the film on behalf of the publication, describing the film as "outrageously funny". Although Le Building failed to win the Audience Award at the 2006 Animex Audience Awards, Stash DVD magazine singled the film out as its favorite among the nominees.

Gnap Gnap, another Gobelins film from the same year as Le Building, features a brief audio clip of the Russian man singing. Both films had the same sound designer, Olivier Crouet.

Two years after Le Building's release, Oktapodi, another animated short film from Gobelins, received an Oscar nomination for Best Animated Short Film. One of that film's directors, Emud Mokhberi, namechecked Le Building as an inspiration while saying that Oktapodi "had to be fresh and original and up to par with the other films coming out of Gobelins in recent years".

In 2007, an image from Le Building was used to illustrate an Animation Magazine article touting the best animation universities worldwide. The following year, Animation World Network ran an article by Heather Kenyon, dubbing Gobelins one of the "best schools for narrative storytelling" and singling out Le Building as one of Gobelins' best then-contemporary works.

A student project created by Doug Woods at Vancouver Film School in 2008 pairs Le Building with a newly recorded audio track. This project won a Student ELAN Award in the category Best Original Sound Design/Musical Score for an Animated Production or Game.

The 2014 book Hybrid Animation: Integrating 2D and 3D Assets, written by Tina O'Hailey, and published by CRC Press, names Le Building as "a fabulous example" of a multiplane camera being used to create the perception of depth in animation. In 2015, Gobelins released a promotional video, featuring animation director Kyle Balda. In the video, Balda discusses the difference between American and French animation styles, noting that French animation is often more angular. As he discusses this, a short clip from Le Building is shown.

== See also ==
- Mister Smile
- Geraldine (2000 film)
- Fish Heads Fugue and Other Tales for Twilight
