= 2005 in anime =

The events of 2005 in anime.

== Events ==
Home video sales of anime DVDs and Laserdiscs in Japan in this year were worth 97.1 billion yen.

- May 9 – A-1 Pictures is created

== Accolades ==
At the Mainichi Film Awards, Fullmetal Alchemist the Movie: Conqueror of Shamballa won the Animation Film Award and tough guy! won the Ōfuji Noburō Award. Internationally, Howl's Moving Castle was nominated for the Academy Award for Best Animated Feature. It won the New York Film Critics Circle Award for Best Animated Film and was also nominated for the Annie Award for Best Animated Feature, the fifth consecutive year an anime was nominated for the award. Hayao Miyazaki received the Golden Lion for Lifetime Achievement at the 62nd Venice International Film Festival.

== Releases ==
=== Films ===
A list of anime films that debuted in theaters between 1 January and 31 December 2005.

Release date	English title	Director	Studio	Runtime	Japanese title
January 3	Digital Monster X-Evolution	Hiroyuki Kakudou	Toei Animation	80	Dejitaru monsutā zevuoryūshon
January 15	Hurdle	Satoshi Dezaki	Magic Bus	90	Hādoru
January 29	The Prince of Tennis: A Gift from Atobe	Takayuki Hamana	Trans Arts	30	Tenisu no ōjisama: Atobe kara no Okurimono – Kimi ni Sasageru Tenipuri Matsuri
January 29	The Prince of Tennis: Two Samurais, The First Game	Takayuki Hamana	Production I.G	65	Tennis no Oujisama: Futari no Samurai The First Game
February 5	Air	Osamu Dezaki	Toei Animation	91	Air: The Motion Picture
February 19	Kino's Journey: Life Goes On	Takashi Watanabe	A.C.G.T	29	Kino no Tabi: Nanika o Suru Tame ni – Life Goes On
March 5	One Piece: Baron Omatsuri and the Secret Island	Mamoru Hosoda	Toei Animation	91	One Piece: Omatsuri Danshaku to Himitsu no Shima
March 12	Duel Masters: Curse of the Death Phoenix	Waruo Suzuki	Studio Hibari	45	Gekijouban Duel Masters: Yami no Shiro no Maryuuou Curse of the Death Phoenix
March 12	Rockman. EXE: The Program of Light and Darkness	Takao Kato	Xebec	48	Rockman.EXE: Hikari to Yami no Program
March 25	The Old Crocodile	Koji Yamamura	Yamamura Animation	12	Toshi o Totta Wani
April 9	Detective Conan: Strategy Above the Depths	Yasuichiro Yamamoto	TMS Entertainment	110	Meitantei Conan: Suiheisenjyou no Strategy
April 16	Futari wa Pretty Cure: Max Heart Movie	Junji Shimizu	Toei Animation	70	Futari wa Pretty Cure: Max Heart
April 16	Crayon Shin-chan: The Legend Called Buri Buri 3 Minutes Charge	Yūji Mutō	Shin-Ei Animation	88	Crayon Shin-chan: Densetsu o Yobu Buriburi Sanpun Pokkiri Daishingeki
May 28	Mobile Suit Zeta Gundam: A New Translation – Heir to the Stars	Yoshiyuki Tomino	Sunrise	94	Kidou Senshi Z Gundam I: Hoshi wo Tsugu Mono
June 30	Tomorrow Will Be a Brighter Day	Yoshio Takeuchi	AYCO	89	Ashita Genki ni Nare! ~Hanbun no Satsumaimo~
July 16	Go! Anpanman: Happy's Big Adventure	Hiroyuki Yano	TMS Entertainment	51	Soreike! Anpanman: Happy no Daibōken
July 16	Kahei's Ocean	Toshiro Kuni	Doga Kobo	75	Kahei no Umi
July 16	Pokémon: Lucario and the Mystery of Mew	Kunihiko Yuyama	OLM	100	Pocket Monster Advance Generation: Mew to Hadō no Yūsha Lucario
July 23	Fullmetal Alchemist: The Movie – Conqueror of Shamballa	Seiji Mizushima	Bones	104	Gekijōban Hagane no Renkinjutsushi – Shamballa wo Yuku Mono
August 6	Naruto the Movie: Legend of the Stone of Gelel	Hirotsugu Kawasaki	Pierrot	97	Gekijyouban Naruto Daigekitotsu! Maboroshi no Chiteiiseki Dattebayo!
August 6	Zatch Bell: Attack of Mechavulcan	Takuya Igarashi	Toei Animation	84	Konjiki no Gash Bell!!
August 20	Tsubasa RESERVoir CHRoNiCLE the Movie: The Princess in the Birdcage Kingdom	Itsuro Kawasaki	Production I.G	35	Tsubasa Chronicle – Torikago no Kuni no Himegimi
August 20	xxxHOLiC the Movie: A Midsummer Night's Dream	Tsutomu Mizushima	Production I.G	60	Gekijōban xxxHOLiC – Manatsu no Yoru no Yume
September 9	The Glass Rabbit	Setsuko Shibuichi	Magic Bus	84	Glass no Usagi
September 9	Nagasaki 1945 ~ The Angelus Bells	Seiji Arihara	Mushi Production	82	Nagasaki 1945 ~ Angelus no Kane
September 14	Final Fantasy VII: Advent Children	Tetsuya Nomura	Visual Works	101	Final Fantasy VII: Advent Children
December 10	Pretty Cure MaxHeart The 2nd Movie: Friends of the Snow-Laden Sky	Junji Shimizu	Toei Animation	71	Futari wa Pretty Cure Max Heart 2: Yukizora no Tomodachi
December 10	In the Night of the Storm	Gisaburō Sugii	Group TAC	107	Arashi no Yoru ni
December 17	Mushiking: The Road to the Greatest Champion	Shunji Ōga	TMS Entertainment	50	Kouchuu Ouja Mushiking: Greatest Champion e no Michi
December 17	Black Jack: The Two Doctors Of Darkness	Makoto Tezuka	Tezuka Productions	92	Black Jack: Futari no Kuroi Isha

=== Television series ===
A list of anime television series that debuted between January 1 and December 31, 2005.

First run start and end dates	Title	Episodes	Studio	Director	Alternate title	Ref
January 1 – March 26	Magical Canan	13	AIC	Masahi Abe	Magical Kanan	
January 5 – March 30	Lime-iro Ryuukitan X	13	A.C.G.T.	Tsuneo Tominaga	Raimui roryūkitan X kurosu ~ koi, kyō hetekudasai.~	
January 5 – March 30	Starship Operators	13	J.C.Staff	Takashi Watanabe	Sutāshippu operētāzu	
January 6 – March 24	Jinki: Extend	12	Feel	Masahiko Murata	Jinki: ekusutendo	
January 6 – March 24	Xenosaga: The Animation	12	Toei Animation	Gō Koga (chief); Shigeyasu Yamauchi	Zenosāga The animēshon	
January 6 – March 30	Negima!	26	Xebec	Nagisa Miyazaki	Mahō sensei negima!	
January 7 – March 25	Air	13	Kyoto Animation	Tatsuya Ishihara	AIR	
January 7 – December 9, 2006	The World of Golden Eggs	26	Plus Heads; Studio Crocodile	Yoshihiko Dai	Za wārudo obu gōruden eggusu	
January 7 – July 8	Ah! My Goddess	26	AIC	Hiroaki Gōda	Āmmegamisama~tsu	
January 8 – December 31	Transformers Galaxy Force	52	Gonzo	Hiroyuki Kakudō (chief); Manabu Ono	Toransufōmā: gyarakushīfōsu	
January 8 – June 25	Peach Girl	25	Studio Comet	Hiroshi Ishiodori	Peach Girl: Super Pop Love Hurricane	
January 9 – September 25	Gallery Fake	37	TMS Entertainment; Tokyo Kids; Minami Machi Bugyousho	Akira Nishimori (eps 1-12); Osamu Yamasaki (eps 13-37)	Gyararī feiku	
January 9 – March 27	Suki na Mono wa Suki Dakara Shou ga Nai!!	12	Zexcs	Haruka Ninomiya	Sukisho	
January 9 – June 19	Witch Village Story	24			Uitchi vuirejji sutōrī	
January 10 – March 28	Ultimate Girls	12	Studio Matrix	Yuji Mutoh	UG ☆ arutimettogāru	
January 10 – June 27	Mahoraba ~Heartful Days	26	Studio Deen	Shinichiro Kimura	Ma horaba ~ Heartful days ~	
January 17 – February 21	Damekko Doubutsu	26	Magic Bus	Setsuko Shibuichi	Damekko dōbutsu	
January 27 – April 21	Girls Bravo: Second Season	13	AIC	Ei Aoki	Gāruzu burabō sekando season	
January 30 – September 2, 2006	Shin Chou Kyou Ryo: Condor Hero II	26	Nippon Animation		Kondoru hideo densetsu II Jōyō fūun	
February 5 – April 30	Buzzer Beater	13	TMS Entertainment	Shigeyuki Miya	BUZZER BEATER	
February 6 – January 29, 2006	Futari wa Precure: Max Heart	47	Toei Animation	Daisuke Nishio	Futari hapuri kyua ̄ makkusu hāto	
February 7 – April 25	Masuda Kousuke Gekijou Gag Manga Biyori	12	Artland	Akitarō Daichi	Masuda kōsuke gekijō gyagumangabiyori	
April 2 – June 25	Koi Koi 7	13	Studio Flag	Yoshitaka Fujimoto	Koi koi 7	
April 2 – March 25, 2006	Twin Princess of Wonder Planet	51	Hal Film Maker	Junichi Sato (chief); Shōgo Kōmoto	Fushigiboshi no futagohime	
April 3 – March 25, 2007	MÄR	102	SynergySP	Masaharu Okuwaki; Keiichiro Kawaguchi (eps 53-102)	Meru	
April 3 – March 26, 2006	Onegai My Melody	52	Studio Comet	Makoto Moriwaki	Onegai mai merodi	
April 3 – June 19	Izumo: Flash of a Brave Sword	12	Studio Kyuuma; Trinet Entertainment	Tsuneo Tominaga	Izumo: Takeki Tsurugi no Senki	
April 3 – June 19	Emma – A Victorian Romance	12	Pierrot	Tsuneo Kobayashi	Eikoku Koi Monogatari Emma	
April 4 – March 27, 2006	The Law of Ueki	51	Studio Deen	Hiroshi Watanabe	Ueki no hōsoku	
April 4 – May 15, 2006	Taiko Drum Master	26	Studio Bingo		Taiko no Tatsujin	
April 4 – June 28	Comic Party Revolution	13	Chaos Project; Radix	Yasunori Yamada (eps 5-13) (chief); Junichi Sakata (eps 1-4); Mitsuhiro Tōgō (eps 5-13)	Komikku pātī revuoryūshon	
April 5 – September 27	Elemental Gelade	26	Xebec	Shigeru Ueda	Erementaru jereido	
April 5 – September 27	Aquarion	26	Satelight	Shōji Kawamori	Sōsei no akuerion	
April 6 – March 29, 2006	Mushiking: The Guardians of the Forest	52	TMS Entertainment	Shigeyasu Yamauchi	Kōchūōja mushikingu ~ mori no min no densetsu ~	
April 6 – March 19, 2008	Eyeshield 21	145	Gallop	Masayoshi Nishida (Chief); Shin Katagai (eps 104-145)	Aishīrudo 21	
April 6 – June 22	Strawberry 100%	12	Madhouse	Osamu Sekita	Ichigo 100%	
April 6 – March 29, 2006	Glass Mask	51	Tokyo Movie Shinsha	Mamoru Hamatsu	Glass no Kamen	
April 7 – June 30	Loveless	12	J.C.Staff	Yū Kō	LOVELESS	
April 7 – June 30	Futakoi Alternative	13	Feel; Studio Flag; Ufotable	Takayuki Hirao	Futakoi orutanatibu	
April 7 – September 29	Best Student Council	26	J.C.Staff	Yoshiaki Iwasaki	Gokujou Seitokai	
April 8 – September 30	Speed Grapher	24	Gonzo	Kunihisa Sugishima	Supīdo gurafā	
April 8 – July 1	He Is My Master	12	Gainax; Shaft	Shouji Saeki	Kore ga Watashi no Goshujinsama	
April 9 – October 15	Tsubasa Chronicle	52	Bee Train	Kōichi Mashimo; Hiroshi Morioka (2nd Season, along with Mashimo)	Tsubasa kuronikuru	
April 10 – March 26, 2006	Zoids: Genesis	50	Shogakukan Music & Digital Entertainment	Kazunori Mizuno	Zoido jeneshisu	
April 11 – June 27	King of Braves GaoGaiGar Final Grand Glorious Gathering	12	Sunrise	Yoshitomo Yonetani	Yuusha-Ou GaoGaiGar Final Grand Glorious Gathering	
April 13 – September 21	Basilisk	24	Gonzo	Fumitomo Kizaki	Bajirisuku kōga ninpōchō	
April 15 – September 27	Honey and Clover	24	J.C.Staff	Ken'ichi Kasai	Hachimitsu to kurōbā	
April 17 – April 2, 2006	Eureka Seven	50	Bones	Tomoki Kyoda	Kōkyōshihen eureka sebun	
April 22 – present	Doraemon		Shin-Ei Animation	Kōzō Kusuba (2005-04-15; 2005-04-15) (chief); Tsutomu Shibayama (chief); Shinnosuke Yakuwa; Soichiro Zen (2009)	Doraemon	
April 29 – October 28	Trinity Blood	24	Gonzo	Tomohiro Hirata	Toriniti Buraddo	
May 7 – July 23	New Legend of the Heroes of the Warring Nations – The Ten Sanada Brave Soldiers	12	G&G Entertainment; Group TAC	Keizō Shimizu	Shinshaku Sengoku Eiyuu Densetsu: Sanada Juu Yuushi The Animation	
May 21 – November 19	Absolute Boy	26	Ajia-do	Tomomi Mochizuki	Zettai Shounen	
May 22 – February 12, 2006	The Snow Queen	36	TMS Entertainment	Osamu Dezaki	Yuki no Joou	
June 7 – November 29	Patalliro Saiyuuki!	26	Magic Bus	Kenichi Maejima	Patariro saiyūki	
June 29 – September 27	Kamichu!	12	Brain's Base	Koji Masunari	Kamichu!	
July 1 – September 16	Ah My Buddha	13	Studio Deen	Keitaro Motonaga	Amaenaide yotsu!!	
July 2 – June 24, 2006	Sugar Sugar Rune	51	Pierrot	Yukihiro Matsushita	Shuga shuga rūn	
July 2 – September 24	My Wife is a High School Girl	13	Madhouse	Jun Shishido	Okusama wa joshikōsei	
July 2 – September 24	Moeyo Ken TV	13	Picture Magic; Trinet Entertainment	Toshikatsu Tokoro	Kidō shinsenkumi moeyoken TV	
July 2 – December 24	D.C.S.S: Da Capo Second Season	26	Feel	Munenori Nawa	D. C. S. S. ~ Da kāpo sekando shīzun ~	
July 4 – December 26	Paniponi Dash!	26	Gansis; Shaft	Shin Ōnuma; Akiyuki Shinbo	Pani poni dasshu!	
July 4 – September 26	Oku-sama wa Mahō Shōjo: Bewitched Agnes	13	Studio Deen	Hiroshi Nishikiori	Okusama wa mahō shōjo	
July 4 – September 26	Gun Sword	26	AIC ASTA	Gorō Taniguchi	Gan × sōdo	
July 5 – September 27	Play Ball	13	Eiken	Satoshi Dezaki (chief); Setsuko Shibuichi	Purei bōru	
July 5 – September 27	Akahori's Heretical Hour Love Game	13	Radix	Hitoyuki Matsui	A Kahori gedō awāra buge	
July 7 – December 29	Suzuka	26	Studio Comet	Hiroshi Fukutomi	Suzuka	
July 7 – September 29	Tide-Line Blue	12	Telecom Animation Film	Umanosuke Iida	Taidorain burū	
July 8 – January 6, 2006	Shuffle!	26	Asread	Naoto Hosoda	Shaffuru!	
July 9 – October 1	Petopeto-san	13	Xebec M2	Akira Nishimori	Petopeto-san	
July 14 – October 20	Full Metal Panic! The Second Raid	13	Kyoto Animation	Yasuhiro Takemoto	Furumetaru panikku! The Second Raid	
July 15 – October 14	Ichigo Mashimaro	12	Daume	Takuya Satō	Ichigo mashimaro	
August 4 – February 27, 2009	Oden-kun	156	Studio Egg	Michiya Katō	Oden-kun	
August 6 – February 18, 2006	Guyver: The Bioboosted Armor	26	OLM	Katsuhito Akiyama	Kyoushoku Soukou Guyver	
September 10 – October 28, 2006	G.I. Joe: Sigma 6	26	Gonzo	Kobun Shizuno	G. I. Jō: Shiguma 6	
October 1 – April 1, 2006	Rockman.EXE Beast	25	Xebec	Takao Kato	Rokkuman eguze bīsuto	
October 1 – September 30, 2006	Idaten Jump	52	Trans Arts	Takayuki Hamana	Idaten janpu	
October 2 – December 25	Magical Girl Lyrical Nanoha A's	13	Seven Arcs	Keizou Kusakawa	Mahō shōjo ririkaru nanoha ēsu	
October 2 – March 26, 2006	Canvas 2	24	Zexcs	Itsuro Kawasaki	Kanbasu 2 ~ nijiiro no suketchi ~	
October 3 – December 26	Happy Seven: The TV Manga	13	Studio Hibari	Tsutomu Yabuki	Happyi sebun ~ za terebi manga ~	
October 4 – January 3, 2006	To heart 2	13	OLM	Norihiko Sutō	To~uhāto 2	
October 4 – March 28, 2006	Gunparade Orchestra	24	Brain's Base	Yutaka Satō (Chief); Toshiya Shinohara	Ganparēdo ōkesutora	
October 4 – July 18, 2006	Card Wang: Mix Master	39	Nippon Animation	Soung-Cheol Ko; Kenichi Nishida	Kādo kingu mikkusu masutā	
October 4 – September 26, 2006	Angel Heart	50	TMS Entertainment	Toshiki Hirano	Enjeru hāto	
October 4 – September 26, 2006	Animal Lane	51	Gallop	Jongsik Nam; Yukio Nishimoto	Animaru yokochō	
October 4 – September 26, 2006	Capeta	52	Studio Comet	Shin Misawa	Kapeta	
October 5 – March 29, 2006	Cluster Edge	25	Sunrise	Hitoyuki Matsui (chief); Masashi Ikeda	Kurasutā ejji	
October 5 – March 29, 2006	Akagi	26	Madhouse	Yūzō Satō	Tōhai densetsu akagi yami ni maiorita tensai	
October 5 – April 5, 2006	Hell Girl	26	Studio Deen	Takahiro Omori	Djigoku shōjo	
October 6 – December 29	Aria the Animation	13	Hal Film Maker	Junichi Sato	ARIA The ANIMATION	
October 6 – January 18, 2006	IGPX: Immortal Grand Prix	26	Production I.G	Mitsuru Hongo	IGPX -Immortal Grand Prix-	
October 6 – March 23, 2006	Shakugan no Shana: Season I	24	J.C.Staff	Takashi Watanabe	Shakugan no shana	
October 6 – March 30, 2006	Bouken Ou Beet Excellion	25	Toei Animation	Tatsuya Nagamine	Bōken ō byito ekuserion	
October 7 – March 31, 2006	Black Cat	24	Gonzo	Shin Itagaki	Burakku kyatto	
October 7 – March 31, 2006	My-Otome	26	Sunrise	Masakazu Obara	Mai-Otome	
October 7 – March 31, 2006	Solty Rei	24	Gonzo; AIC	Yoshimasa Hiraike	Soruti rei	
October 8 – September 23, 2006	Blood+	50	Production I.G	Junichi Fujisaku	Buraddo purasu	
October 9 – December 25	Ginban Kaleidoscope	12	Karaku	Shinji Takamatsu	Ginban kareidosukōpu	
October 10 – March 26, 2006	Fighting Beauty Wulong	25	TMS Entertainment	Yoshio Suzuki	Kakutō bishin bu ryū	
October 11 – December 27	Lamune	12	Trinet Entertainment; Picture Magic	Jun Takada	Ramune	
October 12 – March 29, 2006	Noein: to your other self	24	Satelight	Kazuki Akane	Noein mō hitori no kimi e	
October 14 – December 30	Paradise Kiss	12	Madhouse	Osamu Kobayashi	Paradise kiss	
October 21 – January 27, 2006	Rozen Maiden: Traumend	12	Nomad	Kou Matsuo	Rōzen meiden toroimento	
October 23 – June 19, 2006	Mushishi	26	Artland	Hiroshi Nagahama	Mushishi	
October 29 – April 29, 2006	Dae Jang Geum: Jang Geum's Dream	26	Sonokong; Heewon Entertainment		Shōjo changu munoyume	
November 3 – May 11, 2006	Karin	24	J.C.Staff	Shinichiro Kimura	Karin	
November 3 – May 11, 2006	Ginga Legend Weed	26	Studio Deen	Toshiyuki Kato	Ginga densetsu uido	
November 12 – September 24, 2006	Gaiking: Legend of Daiku-Maryu	39	Toei Animation	Masahiro Hosoda	Gaikingu Legend of Daiku – Maryu	
December 6 – September 19, 2006	D.I.C.E.	40	Xebec	Jun Kamiya	Dino bureikā	
December 10 – June 10, 2006	Major S2	26	Studio Hibari	Kenichi Kasai	Mejā (dai 2 shirīzu)	
December 26 – April 2, 2007	Minami no Shima no Chiisana Hikouki Birdy	105	Studio Deen	Bob Shirohata	Minami no shima no chīsana hikōki bādī	

=== OVAs & Specials ===
A list of original video animations (OVAs), original net animations (ONAs), original animation DVDs (OADs), and specials released between 1 January and 31 December 2005. Titles listed are named after their series if their associated OVA, special, etc. was not named separately.

Release date	English title	Episodes	Studio	Director	Japanese title	Type	Ref
January 2	The Tuna Cop	1	Gallop		Kochira katsushikaku kameari kōenmae hashutsujo: maguro ni notta keikan	Special	
January 28 – March 25	Guardian Hearts-Power UP!	4	VENET	Yasuhiro Kuroda	Gaadeian hātsu pawaatsupu!	OVA	
January 28 – June 29	Grenadier: The Beautiful Warrior Specials	6	Group TAC; Studio Live	Hiroshi Koujina	Grenadier: Hohoemi no Senshi Specials	Special	
January 28 – January 27, 2010	My-Hime Specials	27	Sunrise		Mai-HiME Specials	Special	
January 29	New Legend of the Heroes of the Warring Nations – The Ten Sanada Brave Soldiers	1	T.P.O	Keizō Shimizu	Shinshaku Sengoku Eiyuu Densetsu: Sanada Juu Yuushi	Special	
February 14	Rain, the Little Girl, and My Letter	1		Empire Boy	Ame to Shoujo to Watashi no Tegami	ONA	
February 19 – August 20	Kyou kara Maou! Great Complete Collection	9	Studio Deen		Kyōkaramaō! Taizenshū	Special	
February 20	Fairy Musketeers Little Red Riding Hood	1	Madhouse	Tetsuro Araki	Otogi jūshi akazukin	OVA	
February 24	Battle Fairy Girl Help! Mave-chan	1	Studio Fantasia	Takeshi Mori	Sentou Yousei Shoujo Tasukete! Mave-chan	OVA	
February 25	School Days	1	Animation Planet		Sukūru deizu	ONA	
February 25 – June 29	Sky of Iriya, Summer of UFO	6	Toei Animation	Naoyuki Itō	Iriyanosora, yūfō no natsu	OVA	
February 25 – August 26	W: Wish Omake	4	Picture Magic; Trinet Entertainment	Osamu Sekita	W 〜 uisshu 〜	Special	
March 5 – January 27, 2006	Stratos 4 Advance	6	Studio Fantasia	Takeshi Mori	Sutoratosu fō adovuansu	OVA	
March 10	Growlanser IV: Wayfarer of Time	1	feel.; Zexcs	Masahiko Murata	Gurōransā IV ~ ueifārā of the time ~	OVA	
March 13 – September 22	Bludgeoning Angel Dokuro-chan	4	HAL Film Maker; Nomad	Tsutomu Mizushima	Bokusatsu tenshi dokuro-chan	OVA	
March 16	DearS: Is It a Golden Ball?	1	Daume		Kin no tamadesu no?	Special	
March 16	Tenjho Tenge: The Ultimate Fight	2	Madhouse	Toshifumi Kawase	Tenjōtenge ultimate faito	OVA	
March 19	Fullmetal Alchemist: Reflections	1	Bones		Hagane no renkinjutsushi tabi no hajimari	Special	
March 25 – October 26, 2007	Karas	6	Tatsunoko Production	Keiichi Satō	Karasu	OVA	
March 27	Kochikame: Ryoutsu vs. Nakimushi Idol!? Nihon 1-shuu Dai Sugoroku Game!!	1	Gallop		Kochira Katsushikaku Kameari Kouenmae Hashutsujo: Ryoutsu vs. Nakimushi Idol!? Nihon 1-shuu Dai Sugoroku Game!!	Special	
March 30	Tenjho Tenge: The Past Chapter	1	Madhouse		Tenchi sōzō kako Fumi	OVA	
April 1	Air Recap	1	Kyoto Animation	Tatsuya Ishihara	Eā sōshūhen	Special	
April 1	Ah! My Goddess Specials	3	AIC		Āmmegamisama~tsu	Special	
April 15	Doraemon Specials				Doraemon (2005) Specials	Special	
April 21	Elfen Lied: In the Passing Rain, or, How Can a Girl Have Reached Such Feelings?	1	Arms	Mamoru Kanbe	Erufen rīto: tōriame nite aruiwa, shōjo wa ikani shite sono shinjō ni itatta ka?	Special	
April 22	CLAMP School Detectives Shorts	13	Pierrot	Osamu Nabeshima	Aruhi no Clamp Gakuen Tanteidan	Special	
April 22	Utakata: Summer Pair of Early Winter	1	HAL Film Maker	Keiji Gotō	Uta∽-kata – shotō no sō natsu	Special	
April 29	Munto 2: Beyond the Walls of Time	1	Kyoto Animation	Yoshiji Kigami	Munto: Toki no Kabe wo Koete	OVA	
April 30	Monsieur Greenpeas: 10 Short Stories	10		Yasuo Kurita	Midori hisui shinshi 10 no tanpen shōsetsu	Special	
May 5	Haruwo	1	CoMix Wave Films	Tact Aoki	Haruwo	OVA	
May 18	I'm My Little Sister's Secret	1	Vega Entertainment	Yukiyo Teramoto	Boku wa Imouto ni Koi wo Suru	OVA	
May 24	Open Your Mind	1	Aniplex	Hiroyuki Hayashi	Mezame no Hakobune	OVA	
May 25	Konjiki no Gash Bell!!: 00F – The Man With the Golden Tits	1	Toei Animation		Konjiki no Gash Bell!!: Ougon no Chichi wo Motsu Otoko	OVA	
May 25 – October 25	UFO Ultramaiden Valkyrie 3: Bride of Celestial Souls' Day	6	TNK	Yoshihiro Takamoto	UFO Princess Valkyrie 3: Seiresetsu no Hanayome	OVA	
May 27	Shuffle! Prologue	1	asread.		shaffuru! Purorōgu	OVA	
June 2	Kyou mo Kyou to te Tape wa Mawaru	1			Kyō mo kyō to te tēpu wa mawaru	Special	
June 8	Ichigo Mashimaro Episode 0	1	Daume		Ichigo mashimaro	Special	
June 12	Bleach: 13 Court Guard Squads Omake	1	Pierrot		Bleach: Gotei 13 Omake	Special	
June 22 – September 28	Sweet Valerian Specials	8	Madhouse		Suuīto vuarerian	Special	
June 29	Samurai Gun Special	1	Studio Egg		Samurai gan 8. 5-Wa kesenai kako	Special	
July 6	Mars of Destruction	1	WAO World	Yoshiaki Sato	Hametsu no Mars	OVA	
July 6	Full Metal Panic! The Second Raid Episode 00	1	Kyoto Animation		Furumetaru panikku! The Second Raid zen'yasai `Scene 00'	Special	
July 6 – August 15, 2009	Gakkou no Kaidan	10	Studio Ranmaru; Trinet Entertainment; WAO World	Hiroshi Kugimiya (eps 5-8); Yukimatsu Ito (eps 3-4); Yukio Okazaki (eps 1-2); Yusaku Saotome (eps 9-10)	Gakkō no kaidan	OVA	
July 10 – November 2010	Stag Beetle Tsumami	84			Kuwagata Tsumami	ONA	
July 22	Banner of the Stars II Recap	1	Sunrise		Seikai no senki II tokubetsu-hen	Special	
July 22	Lupin III: Angel Tactics	1	TMS Entertainment	Shigeyuki Miya	Rupan sansei – tenshi no takutikusu ~ yume no kakera wa koroshi no kaori ~	Special	
July 22 – January 27, 2006	Love Love 7 DVD Specials	7			Koi koi 7	Special	
July 25	Platonic Chain: Ansatsu Jikkouchuu	1	ACiD FiLM		Puratonikku chēn: ansatsu jikkō-chū	Special	
July 31	Fushigiboshi no☆Futagohime Recap	1	HAL Film Maker		Fushigiboshi no futagohime hime marugoto DVD	OVA	
August 5 – September 9	Saikano: Another Love Song	2	Studio Fantasia	Mitsuko Kase	Saishuu Heiki Kanojo: Another Love Song	OVA	
August 6	Banner of the Stars III	2	Sunrise	Yasuchika Nagaoka	Seikai no senki III	OVA	
August 10	Harunohi	1			Shunyo to Watashi	ONA	
August 14	Bincho-Tan	1	Ishikawa Pro	Naoya Ishikawa	Jishu seisaku mūbī bin chō Tan	OVA	
August 24 – January 25, 2006	Majokko Tsukune-chan	6	Xebec	Hiroaki Sakurai	Majokko tsukune-chan	OVA	
August 26 – November 25	Prayers	2	PPM	Yusaku Saotome	Pureiyāzu	OVA	
August 28 – September 4	Air in Summer	2	Kyoto Animation	Tatsuya Ishihara	Eā in samā	Special	
August 28	Hotori: Tada Saiwai wo Koinegau	1	Sunrise	Takashi Anno	Hotori ~ tada saiwai o koinegau	Special	
September 2 – October 27	Navia Dratp	5			NAVIA DRATP	ONA	
September 14	Tenchi Muyo! Ryo Ohki: Final Confrontations	1	AIC	Masaki Kajishima (chief)	Tenchi muyō! Ryōōki daisanki tenchi seirōnaredo hakō shi?	OVA	
September 14	Final Fantasy VII: Last Order	1	Madhouse	Morio Asaka	Rasuto ōdā – fainaru fantajī VII -	Special	
September 14	Mankatsu Special	1	TMS Entertainment		Monkī panchi manga katsudō dai shashin	Special	
September 23	Ghost in the Shell: Stand Alone Complex – The Laughing Man	1	Production I.G	Kenji Kamiyama	Kōkaku kidōtai sutando Alone Complex – The Laughing Man	OVA	
September 23	Fantastic Children Alternate Ending	1	Nippon Animation		Fantajikku chirudoren befōru no kodomo-tachi no sonogo	Special	
September 23	Ghost in the Shell: Stand Alone Complex – The Laughing Man – Tachikomatic Days	1	Production I.G		Kōkaku kidōtai sutando Alone Complex – The Laughing Man tachikoma na hibi	Special	
September 23	I like what I like, so there!: Let's Go to a Hot Spring!	1	Zexcs		Suki na mono wa suki dakara shō ga nai!! Onsen'niikō!	Special	
September 23 – April 16, 2006	In a Distant Time: Character Endings	8	Yumeta Company		Harukanaru jikū no naka de 〜 hachiyōshō 〜 1 〜 9	Special	
September 24	Gintama: Jump Festa 2005 Special	1	Sunrise		Gintama 〜 nanigoto mo saisho ga kanjin'nanode tashō senobi suru kurai ga chōdoii 〜	Special	
October 5 – April 5, 2006	D.C.S.S: Da Capo Second Season Omake	2	feel.		D. C. ~ Da kāpo ~ sekondo shīsun Omake	Special	
October 19	Kino's Journey: Tower Country	1	A.C.G.T.		Kino no tabi – the byūtifuru wārudo – tō no kuni – furī ransu -	Special	
October 21 – October 25, 2006	Gun x Sword-san	13	AIC ASTA		Gan × sōdo-san	Special	
October 22	Eureka Seven Recap	1	Bones		Kōkyō shihen eureka sebun kinkyū tokuban nabigēshon ray = out	Special	
October 23	Kochikame: Ryou-san to Chuuken Lucky Monogatari – Kameari Dai Houimou wo Kawase!!	1	Gallop		Kochira katsushikaku kameari kōenmae hashutsujo: ryōsan to chūken rakkī monogatari 〜 Kameari dai hōi-mō o kawase!!	Special	
November 1 – April 27, 2006	Loveless Specials	6	J.C.Staff		Raburesu ohayō raburesu kun	Special	
November 2 – January 12, 2006	Soukyuu no Fafner: Dead Aggressor – Arcadian Memory	2	Xebec		Sōkyū no fafunā Dead Aggressor Arcadian memory	OVA	
November 16	Ghibli ga Ippai Special Short Short	10	Studio Ghibli	Hayao Miyazaki	Jiburi ga ippai SPECIAL shōto shōto	Special	
November 16	Monster Farm 5: Circus Caravan OVA – Kessei!! Orcoro Circus	1			Monsutā fāmu 5 sākasu kyaraban orijinaru animēshon `kessei! ! Orukoro sākasu'	OVA	
November 23	Rebirth Moon Divergence	1	Wao World	Naotaka Hayashi	Ribāsu mūn dibājensu	OVA	
November 23 – March 29, 2006	Kamichu! Specials	4	Brain's Base		Kamichu!	Special	
November 25	Visions of Frank	9			Visions of Frank: Short Films by Japan's Most Audacious Animators	OVA	
December 2 – March 3, 2006	King of Fighters: Another Day	4	Production I.G	Masaki Tachibana	Za kingu Obu faitāzu anazā dei	ONA	
December 7	Always My Santa	2	TNK	Noriyuki Nakamura	Itsu datte My Santa!	OVA	
December 9 – May 26, 2006	Ichitaka's Delusion Diary	5	Arms; Pierrot		Kazutaka no mōsō nikki	Special	
December 9 – June 23, 2006	I''s Pure	6	Arms; Pierrot	Mamoru Kanbe	Aizu pyua	OVA	
December 14	Ichigo 100% Special 2	1	Madhouse		Ichigo 100-pāsento	Special	
December 16	Kyou Kara Maou! Recap	1			Kyōkaramaō! Taizenshū sono	Special	
December 16 – August 18, 2006	The Wings of Rean	6	Sunrise	Yoshiyuki Tomino	Rīn no tsubasa	ONA	
December 17 – March 18, 2006	Saint Beast: Thousands of Noons & Nights Chapter	2	Madhouse	Masayuki Sakoi	Seinto bīsuto: ikusen no hiru to yoru-hen	OVA	
December 18	One Piece: The Detective Memoirs of Chief Straw Hat Luffy	1	Toei Animation		Wan pīsu nenmatsu tokubetsu kikaku! Mugiwara no rufi oyabun torimono jō	Special	
December 21	Ah! My Buddha Special	1	Studio Deen		Amaenaide yo~tsu!! : Yasumanaide yo~tsu!!	Special	
December 23 – February 24, 2006	Honey and Clover Specials	2	J.C.Staff		Hachimitsu to kurōbā	Special	
December 24	To Heart 2 Special	1	OLM		Tou hāto 2 supesharu edishon	Special	
December 27 – December 28	Monster Special Edition	2	Madhouse		Monsutā supesharu bājon	Special	
December 30	Fafner in the Azure: Dead Aggressor – Right of Left	1	Xebec		Sōkyū no fafunā Dead Aggressor RIGHT OF LEFT	Special	
December 31	2005 Space Odyssey	1			2005-Nen uchūnotabi	Special	

== See also ==
- 2005 in animation
