= Olivier Grunewald =

French photographer and author

- Born: 1959 (age 66–67); Paris
- Education: Centre de Formation des Gobelins, Paris
- Occupation: Photographer
- Spouse: Bernadette Gilbertas
- Children: daughter Fanny
- Awards: World Press Photo (1995) (2002) (2004) (2011), BBC Wildlife Photo Contest

Olivier Grunewald (born 1959) is a French photographer and author, with the main focus on nature, landscapes and wildlife.

Olivier Grunewald was born in Paris in 1959. He started photographing birds at the age of 14.

He studied commercial advertising photography at the Gobelins School of the Image, in Paris. After his studies he began working as a freelance photographer specializing in sports, mountaineering and rock climbing and continued climbing and photographing for the next 10 years with a medium format camera.

Later in his career he switched to a large format camera and began to focus more on the wild nature, and a long-term project on volcanoes. He travels all over the world and collaborates on projects with his wife, Bernadette Gilbertas, a geographer and journalist.

He has also produced documentaries on Wild Earth for Science and Nature magazine.

Since 1997, he specializes in volcanoes and travels the world to illustrate the diversity of the phenomena and the volcanic landscapes.

== Awards ==
- Fondation de la Vocation (in French), 1988
- 4 World Press Photo Awards: 1995 (leatherback turtles in French Guiana), 2002 (Northern lights), 2004 (volcanoes of Kamchatka), 2011 (Nyiragongo volcano)
- distinguished by the Wildlife Photographer of the Year, a contest organized by the BBC and the Natural History Museum of London.

== Publications ==
His work is published in major French and foreign press, including Le Figaro Magazine, GEO, Great Features, VOD, BBC Wildlife, Focus, Airone, National Geographic.
He has also co-authored 15 books:

- Escalade Passion by Jean Kouchner and Olivier Grunewald (Editions Atlas,1991, ISBN 2-7312-1043-5, ISBN 978-2-7312-1043-9)
- Australie terre du rêve, by Olivier Grunewald and Bernadette Gilbertas (Nathan Nature, 1999, ISBN 2-09-261004-X, ISBN 978-2-09-261004-6)
- L'Ouest américain, territoires sauvages by Michel Le Bris and Olivier Grunewald (Le Chêne, 12 May 1999, ISBN 2-84277-154-0, ISBN 978-2-84277-154-6)
- Images de la Création (Éditions du Chêne, 3 November 1999, ISBN 2-84277-541-4, ISBN 2-84277-239-3, ISBN 978-2-84277-239-0)
- Lebendige Erde. by Olivier Grunewald and Bernadette Gilbertas (Weingarten, 1 October 2000, ISBN 3-8170-2527-0, ISBN 978-3-8170-2527-5)
- Islande, l'île rebelle, by Olivier Grunewald and Bernadette Gilbertas (Nathan Nature, 20 September 2001, ISBN 2-09-261004-X, ISBN 978-2-09-261010-7)
- Island. Insel aus Feuer und Eis. by Olivier Grunewald and Bernadette Gilbertas (Delius Klasing Verlag GmbH, 1 October 2002, ISBN 3-7688-1409-2, ISBN 978-3-7688-1409-6)
- Namibie, le désert de la vie, by Olivier Grunewald and Bernadette Gilbertas (Nathan, 2003, ISBN 2-09-261042-2)
- Lumières de la Création (Éditions du Chêne, 3 March 2004, ISBN 2-84277-541-4, ISBN 978-2-84277-541-4)
- Nature, by Olivier Grunewald and Bernadette Gilbertas (Éditions du Chêne, 2004, ISBN 2-84277-526-0)
- L'ouest américain, territoire sauvage, by Olivier Grunewald and Michel Le Bris (Éditions du Chêne, 2005, ISBN 2-84277-618-6)
- Canyons : Au pays des Roches rouges, by Olivier Grunewald and Bernadette Gilbertas (Nathan, 2005, ISBN 2-09-261100-3)
- Tsingy, forêt de Pierre – Madagascar, by Olivier Grunewald and David Wolozan (Altus, 2006, ISBN 2-9526011-0-0)
- Volcans by Olivier Grunewald and Jacques-Marie Bardintzef (Le Chêne sept 2007, ISBN 978-2-84277-707-4)
- Islande, l'île inachevée by Olivier Grunewald and Bernadette Gilbertas (Editions de la Martinière Sept 2011, ISBN 2732444553)
