= Aurélie Neyret =

French illustrator and cartoonist

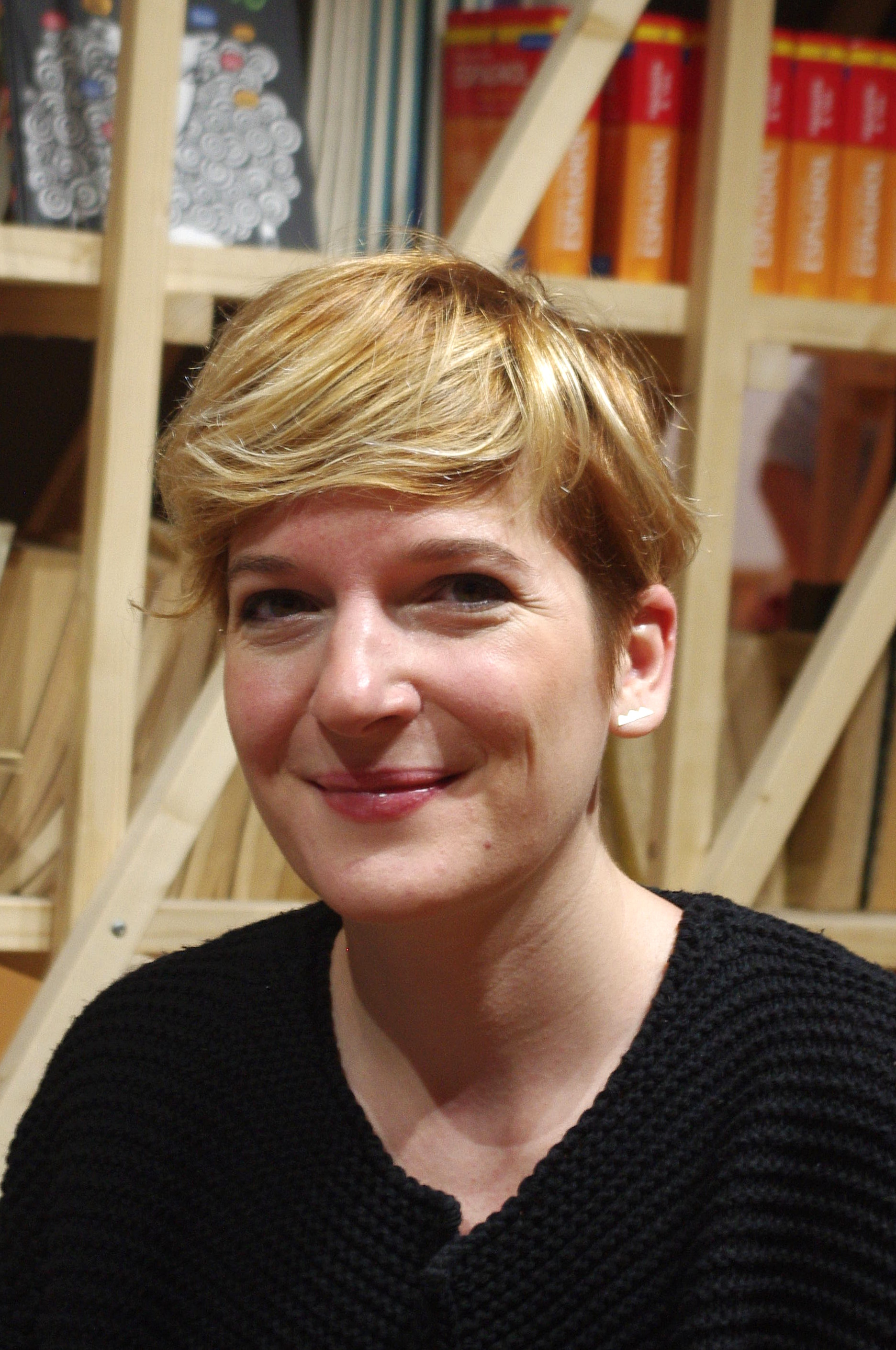
- Neyret in 2017
- Born: 24 May 1983 (age 43)
- Area: Cartoonist
- Pseudonym: Clo
- Notable works: Les Carnets de Cerise
- Awards: Prix Jeunesse 9–12 ans, 2014; Ordre des Arts et des Lettres, 2016 (refused)
- Education: École Émile-Cohl

Aurélie Neyret (pen name, Clo; born 24 May 1983) is a French illustrator and cartoonist of bande dessinée.

== Biography ==
Neyret took courses at the École Émile-Cohl before training as an autodidact. She collaborated with the press, especially youth publications. She participated in collective albums before publishing her first book, Les Carnets de Cerise (2012) with Joris Chamblain. The series met with great critical success and notably won the Angoulême International Comics Festival Prix Jeunesse 9–12 ans in 2014. In February 2016, Neyret refused her appointment to the Ordre des Arts et des Lettres, like three other female comic strip writers.

== Bande dessinée ==
=== Participant ===
- Contes et légendes des pays celtes en bande dessinées, Petit à petit, 2009.
- Michael Jackson en bandes dessinées, Petit à petit, 2009.
- Les Contes en bandes dessinées, Petit à petit, 2010.
- The Rolling Stones en bandes dessinées, Petit à petit, 2010.

=== Albums ===
- Les Filles de Soleil, Soleil: vol.19 (2014), vol.20 (2015), vol.21 (2016), vol.22 (2017), vol.23 (2018), vol.24 (2019).
- Les Carnets de Cerise (scriptwriter, Joris Chamblain), collection Métamorphose, Soleil:
  1. Le Zoo pétrifié, 2012
  2. Le Livre d'Hector, 2013
  3. Le Dernier des cinq trésors, 2014
  4. La Déesse sans visage, 2016
  5. Des premières neiges aux perséides, 2017

Special edition: Les Carnets de Cerise et Valentin , 2018

- Lulu et Nelson, (scriptwriters, Charlotte Girard and Jean-Marie Omont), Soleil:
  1. Cap sur l'Afrique, 2019
  2. Le royaume des lions, 2020
  3. La lionne blanche, 2022

== Selected awards and distinctions ==
- Youth selection, Festival d'Angoulême 2013 for Les carnets de Cerise, volume 1: Le Zoo pétrifié, scripted by Joris Chamblain
- Youth Prize, Angoulême Festival 2014 for Les Carnets de Cerise, volume 2: Le Livre d'Hector, scripted by Joris Chamblain
- Prix Livrentête 2014, Junior Comics Category, for Les carnets de Cerise, volume 1: Le Zoo pétrifié, scripted by Joris Chamblain
- bd BOUM Prize for Education 41 for Young Audiences, for Les Carnets de Cerise, volume 2: Le Livre d'Hector
- Saint-Michel Prize, Humor-Youth Category 2015, for Les Carnets de Cerise, volume 3: Le Dernier des cinq trésors, scripted by Joris Chamblain
- Prix du Paille-en-queue 2016 at the "Salon du Livre jeunesse de l'océan Indien", Category 5th-4th for Les Carnets de Cerise, volume 4: La Déesse sans visage,, scripted by Joris Chamblain.
- Guest of honor, Festival international de la bande dessinée de Chambéry.
- 2020: bd BOUM (Ligue de l'enseignement 41 prize for young audiences), with Charlotte Girard and Jean-Marie Omont for Lulu et Nelson t. 1 Cap sur l'Afrique, Soleil.
