= Xavier Ramonède =

French animator and artist

- Occupations: Animator, illustrator
- Years active: 2002–present

Xavier Ramonède is a French animator and artist, best known for his work on various French films and international co-productions, such as Nocturna and The Illusionist, the French webseries Les Kassos, and his award-winning student film Le Building. Ramonède's artwork has also been featured in multiple publications.

== Early life and education ==
Ramonède hails from Toulouse. He first became interested in drawing at the age of fourteen, after discovering manga. Over the following two years, he developed a strong passion for animation. After meeting Romain Grandjean in high school, Ramonède was brought on as an animator and designer on Grandjean's 2002 stop motion short film Abraxas.

Although Ramonède was inspired by Toy Story to pursue a career in computer animation, he changed course to pursue traditional animation after applying to Gobelins, l'École de l'image. He attended there from 2002 to 2005. In 2004, he created the short student film Récré Fighter, and collaborated with classmates Pierre Perifel, Jun Frederic Violet, and Rémi Zaarour on a second short film, Festival Qualité. The following year, he reteamed with Perifel and Zaarour to create his group thesis film, Le Building, which was also co-directed by Marco Nguyen and Olivier Staphylas. Le Building uses a combination of 2D and 3D animation. Ramonède colored most of the film's traditional animation and also handled most of its compositing. Le Building screened at numerous international film festivals and won several awards, including Best Undergraduate Animation at the Ottawa International Animation Festival.

Ramonède has named Bruce Timm, Jamie Hewlett, Milt Kahl, James Baxter, Robert McGinnis, Mary Blair, and Miroslav Šašek as being among his artistic influences.

== Career ==
The same year as his graduation from Gobelins (2005), Ramonède received credit as an animator on the short film Imago, directed by Cédric Babouche. The following year, Ramonède worked as an animator on Everyone's Hero. Imago afforded Ramonède the opportunity to work with Perifel again, who served as one of the film's supervising animators. The two further collaborated as animators on Nocturna and The Illusionist.

Other animation credits of Ramonède's include various French films and international co-productions, such as 99 Francs, Zarafa, Titeuf, and April and the Extraordinary World, as well as the French webseries Les Kassos, and the music video for C2C's song "Delta". Ramonède has occasionally returned to Gobelins as a teacher and has also worked on various commercials. A 2013 commercial that he worked on for Deezer uses Mcbess characters and received a Bronze Clio Award. A 2015 project that he worked on, called Hippopolis, was directed by French artist Ugo Gattoni and serves as a companion to a scarf that Gattoni designed.

Ramonède has been credited as an animator on Ankama's under-development television project Muffin Jack and Jeremy.

Pin-up art by Ramonède is featured in Volume #1 of Dave Sim and Howard M. Shum's comic book series Gun Fu, which was published by Image Comics in 2005. In 2009, Ramonède contributed to the book Terrible Yellow Eyes, which features artwork inspired by Where the Wild Things Are. Ramonède also created artwork for a proposed art book tie-in to the French board game Color Warz, which in 2016, unsuccessfully sought funding through the French crowdfunding website Ulule.

Daytime Emmy Award-nominated character designer Chris Battle, who has worked on such shows as The Powerpuff Girls and Dexter's Laboratory, has expressed admiration for Ramonède's body of work.
