= Olivier Staphylas =

French animator

- Occupation: Animator
- Years active: 2003–present

Olivier Staphylas is a French animator, known for his work at DreamWorks Animation and for his award-winning student film, Le Building. He joined DreamWorks in 2006 and, within a few years, attained the role of supervising animator on How to Train Your Dragon. His work on 2011's Puss in Boots, supervising the titular character's animation, earned him nominations for an Annie Award and a Visual Effects Society Award. He then served as head of character animation on Penguins of Madagascar. Starting in 2014, he served in that position at Oriental DreamWorks. Staphylas has since left DreamWorks and worked on 2021's Wish Dragon alongside Base FX and Sony Pictures Animation.

== Early life and education ==
Olivier Staphylas was first inspired to become a CG animator in 1995, at the age of fifteen. A French television series, Eye of the Cyclone, aired a special that year called "Imagina 1995", in which a variety of animated works were showcased. It was through this special that Staphylas was first introduced to computer-animated short films. Upon seeing Toy Story the same year, Staphylas knew that he wanted to pursue computer-animation as a career.

He first began experimenting with computer animation on his own, using 3D Studio 4. After attending an IUT in Saint-Raphaël, Var for a year, Staphylas was accepted into the Valenciennes campus of Supinfocom. There, he created a student film called "Bus Stop". In 2003, he graduated with honors, receiving a degree in computer graphics. He then began a brief stint at BUF Compagnie, where he was part of the team behind the music video for Madonna's "Love Profusion".

A year after receiving his degree, Staphylas returned to academics, joining the final year of Gobelins, l'École de l'image's animation program. His thesis film, Le Building, was created with Marco Nguyen, Pierre Perifel, Xavier Ramonède, and Rémi Zaarour. The film uses a combination of 2D and 3D animation. Staphylas held primary responsibility for the computer-animated portions of the film. Le Building screened in numerous international film festivals and won several awards, including Best Undergraduate Animation at the Ottawa International Animation Festival. Staphylas graduated from Gobelins top of his class, with a degree in character animation. According to Staphylas' official bio, he is the first student to graduate from both Supinfocom and Gobelins.

Staphylas has named Milt Kahl, James Baxter, Kristof Serrand, and Glen Keane as four animators who have influenced him.

== Career ==
On the day of his graduation from Gobelins, Staphylas received a job offer from DreamWorks Animation. Looking back on the day, Staphylas has said, "I was stressed because I knew that a lot of industry professionals would be there... I was in the corridor waiting for the announcement of my results and I see Shelley Page, the European representative of Dreamworks Animation. She walks up to me and gives me her business card and tells me she'll call me tomorrow. I was surprised and happy at the same time, but I did not know what was going on...We then enter the room to receive our end-of-year notes...and I learn that I am top of the class...All of a sudden I understand why Shelley Page gave me her card...The next morning, she called me and gave me an appointment in a Parisian restaurant. When I join her, we talk a little and she tells me that the studio would like to hire me. It was quite magical and I had the feeling that my dream came true." After a ten-month process, Staphylas was able to obtain a work visa and came to the United States.

Staphylas initially signed a four-year contract with DreamWorks. He arrived at the studio in June 2006 and joined the production team of Kung Fu Panda as his first project. He was then promoted to supervising animator on How to Train Your Dragon - in a January 2011 self-profile, published by Le Monde, Staphylas identified himself as having been the youngest person in this position at the studio during that time. Staphylas has said that he "helped to develop the dragon's wing system" for the film and that he was responsible for the Deadly Nadder dragon.

For his next project, Staphylas served as supervising animator for the titular character in Puss in Boots. This film earned him Annie Award and Visual Effects Society Award nominations. Staphylas then received another promotion, to head of character animation on Penguins of Madagascar. He moved to India in 2012, where much of the film's animation was created, and lived there for a little over two years. While there, Staphylas carried responsibility for helping to develop the DreamWorks satellite studio in India. In late 2014, he moved to Shanghai, to become head of character animation at Oriental DreamWorks.

By December 2016, Staphylas had left DreamWorks and joined Base FX as head of character animation. In that capacity, Staphylas worked on Wish Dragon, the studio's first animated film. Co-produced with Sony Pictures Animation, Wish Dragon is a Chinese funded-production, written and directed by Christopher Appelhans, that retells the story of Aladdin in modern-day China. The film was released in 2021 on Netflix.

In February 2023, Staphylas served as director for an animated music video for "Love Louder" by The Meeps, a fictional anthropomorphic animal band.

== Accolades ==
Award	Date	Category	Film	Result	Ref(s)
Annie Awards	February 4, 2012	Character Animation in a Feature Production	Puss in Boots	Nominated	
Visual Effects Society Awards	February 7, 2012	Outstanding Animated Character in an Animated Feature	Puss in Boots	Nominated	
