= Pozla =

French comics artist (born 1982)

Rémi Zaarour
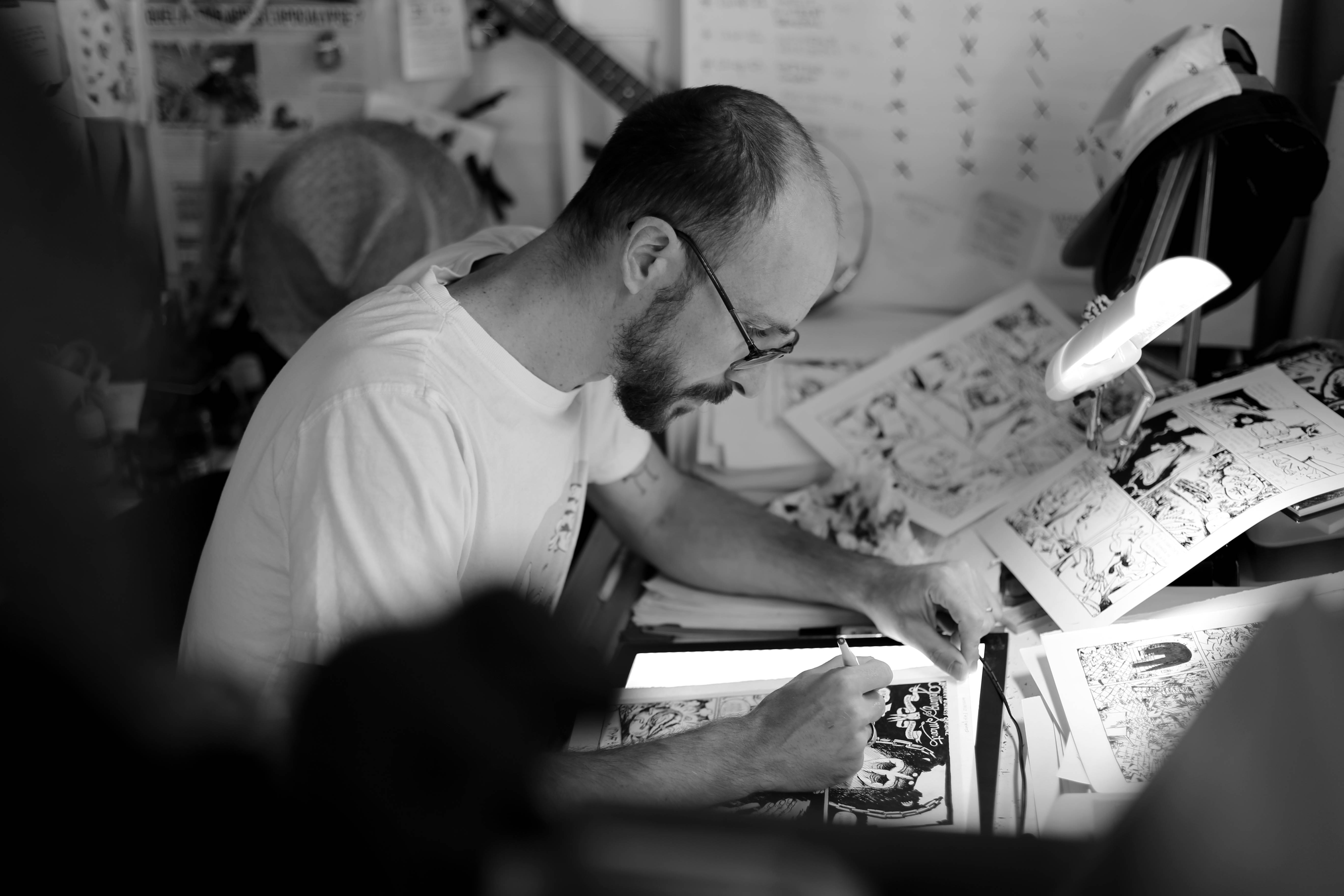
- Pozla in 2016
- Born: 1982 (age 43–44); Amiens, France
- Other name: Pozla
- Education: Gobelins, l'école de l'image
- Occupations: Cartoonist, animator, graffiti artist
- Years active: 2005–present
- Notable work: Le Building; Monkey Bizness; Carnet de santé foireuse

Rémi Zaarour, known by the pseudonym Pozla (born 1982, Amiens, France) is a French cartoonist and animator. He is best known for his graphic novels and for his award-winning student film Le Building.

== Early life and education ==
Zaarour was born in 1982 in Amiens. He has said that he has "always drawn in a rather obsessive way" and that he began experimenting with graffiti at an early age. Through this latter pursuit, he often got into trouble with the police - he also adopted the pseudonym Pozla during this time, which is derived from the French phrase for "Put it there". After high school, he attended ESAAT in Roubaix. He then continued his education at Gobelins, l'École de l'image.

In 2004, Zaarour created the short student film Zob-Zob est amoureux (Zob-Zob in Love). The same year, he collaborated with classmates Xavier Ramonède, Pierre Perifel, and Jun Frederic Violeton on a second short film, Festival Qualité. For his group thesis film, Le Building, Zaarour reteamed with Ramonède and Perifel, and also worked with Marco Nguyen and Olivier Staphylas. Le Building uses a combination of 2D and 3D animation. Zaarour worked on the 2D segments and finalized the film's character designs. He also assisted Perifel in creating the film's backgrounds. Le Building screened in numerous international film festivals and won several awards, including Best Undergraduate Animation at the Ottawa International Animation Festival.

== Career ==
After graduating from Gobelins, Zaarour joined the second season of Lascars as a co-director. He also animated the opening credits sequence for the 2009 feature film of the same name. While at Gobelins, Zaarour had studied Flash animation under one of the creators of Lascars, Boris Dolivet. In the same year that the Lascars feature film was released, Zaarour and Dolivet collaborated on a short film tied to the series - Les Lascars: Cuccarazza, which was directed by Zaarour and partially written by Dolivet.

Extending their partnership into the realm of comics, Zaarour and Dolivet co-created the graphic novel series Monkey Bizness. The first volume of this series was released in 2010. Published under their respective pseudonyms, Pozla and ElDiablo, Zaarour is credited as the illustrator of this series and Dolivet as the writer. Zaarour's wife, Miaw, handled the coloring. Monkey Bizness marked Zaarour's first foray into creating comic book art professionally. The series focuses on Jack Mandrill the baboon and Hammerfist the gorilla, as they navigate the criminal underworld of a post-apocalyptic city known as "Los Animales". Volume 2 of Monkey Bizness was released in 2013, and Volume 3 was released in 2017.

In addition to Lascars, Zaarour has worked as an animator on the films Persepolis, The Rabbi's Cat, Ernest & Celestine, and A Monster in Paris. He has also worked on the television series L'île à lili, Molusco, and Mouk.

The Rabbi's Cat offered Zaarour the chance to reteam with his Gobelins classmate and Le Building co-director Marco Nguyen, who served as an animation director on that film. Zaarour also contributed to the music video for Tryo's song "Greenwashing", which was directed by Nguyen.

Other projects of Zaarour's include co-directing the music video for the song "Lollipop" by Mika, illustrating the book Les petits polars: Si près du malheur à Lille by Michel Quint, and creating the graphic novel, Carnet de santé foireuse, which received a special award at the 43rd Angoulême International Comics Festival.

Zaarour has continued to pursue graffiti art as a side occupation. Unlike his youthful ventures, his work has now been officially recognized and has been exhibited at the Galerie Chappe, the Sergent Paper Gallery, the Gutenberg Museum in Switzerland, and the Galerie l'Attrape Rêve. His work can also be seen in the streets of Arles, Nantes, Aix-en-provence, and the Mile End area of London.

Zaarour regularly returns to his hometown, Amiens, where he teaches a class at Waide Somme, a local animation school.

== Bibliography ==
- (2010) Monkey Bizness: Arnaque, Banane, et Cacahuètes; English translation: Monkey Bizness: Scam, Banana, and Peanuts (illustrator)
- (2013) Monkey Bizness: Les Cacahuètes Sont Cuities; English translation: Monkey Bizness: The Peanuts Are Cooked (illustrator). ISBN 978-2-35910-449-3.
- (2015) Carnet de santé foireuse; English translation: Poor Health Report (author and illustrator)
- (2015) Les petits polars: Si près du malheur à Lille; English translation: The Short Thrillers: So Close to Unhappiness in Lille (illustrator)
- (2017) Monkey Bizness: La Banane du Futur; English translation: Monkey Bizness: The Banana of the Future (illustrator)
