= Marco Nguyen =

French animator

- Occupation: Animator
- Years active: 2004–present

Marco Nguyen is a French animator, known for his work on French feature films, as well as for his short film Lisa, which served as the pilot for an unproduced television series, and for his award-winning student film Le Building. He directed the music video for Tryo's song "Greenwashing", served as an animation director on the 2011 French film The Rabbi's Cat, and served as an assistant director on the 2019 French film The Swallows of Kabul. In 2017, he received an Annie Award nomination in the Character Animation category for The Big Bad Fox & Other Tales. Nguyen also developed cutscenes for the 2018 video game Monster Boy and the Cursed Kingdom.

== Early life and education ==
Nguyen attended Gobelins, l'École de l'image. In 2004, he created two short student films - Burp and Hector, the latter of which was co-directed with Antoine Birot, Lisa Pacalet, and Bertrand Piocelle. The following year, he created his group thesis film, Le Building, with Pierre Perifel, Xavier Ramonède, Olivier Staphylas, and Rémi Zaarour. Le Building uses a combination of 2D and 3D animation. On the film's official website, Nguyen is the only one of the filmmakers credited with having contributed animation in both mediums.

All three of Nguyen's student films have received screenings in international film festivals, and Le Building has won several awards, including Best Undergraduate Animation at the Ottawa International Animation Festival.

== Career ==
Nguyen reteamed with Piocelle to create a two-and-a-half minute pilot for an animated series called Lisa, which was written by Rémy Collignon - the finished work was released in 2009. Lisa was produced by La Station Animation and uses Flash animation. It has been screened in multiple film festivals and was released in issue #54 of Stash DVD magazine. In 2014, Lisa was selected as one of a few shorts to be aired during the special 100th episode of the French animation group Catsuka's television series. Nguyen, Piocelle, and Collignon were interviewed as part of the program. The following year, in honor of Catsuka's fifteenth anniversary, Lisa was shown as part of a special screening held at the Studio des Ursulines.

Nguyen worked as an animation director on The Rabbi's Cat, as a character animator on The Big Bad Fox & Other Tales, and as an assistant director on The Swallows of Kabul. He reteamed with Zaarour for The Rabbi's Cat and further collaborated with Zaarour in 2012 to create a music video for the song "Greenwashing" by Tryo - this music video was directed by Nguyen and also featured animation by Patrick Imbert. For The Big Bad Fox & Other Tales, Nguyen earned a 2017 Annie Award nomination.

Nguyen and Piocelle then worked together on cutscenes for the 2018 video game Monster Boy and the Cursed Kingdom. Nguyen is credited as the game's FMV animation director, while Piocelle is credited as the FMV art director.

Nguyen also worked as animator on Ernest & Celestine and is now animating on the cinema adaptation of The Summit of the Gods.
