= École Émile-Cohl =

French private art school

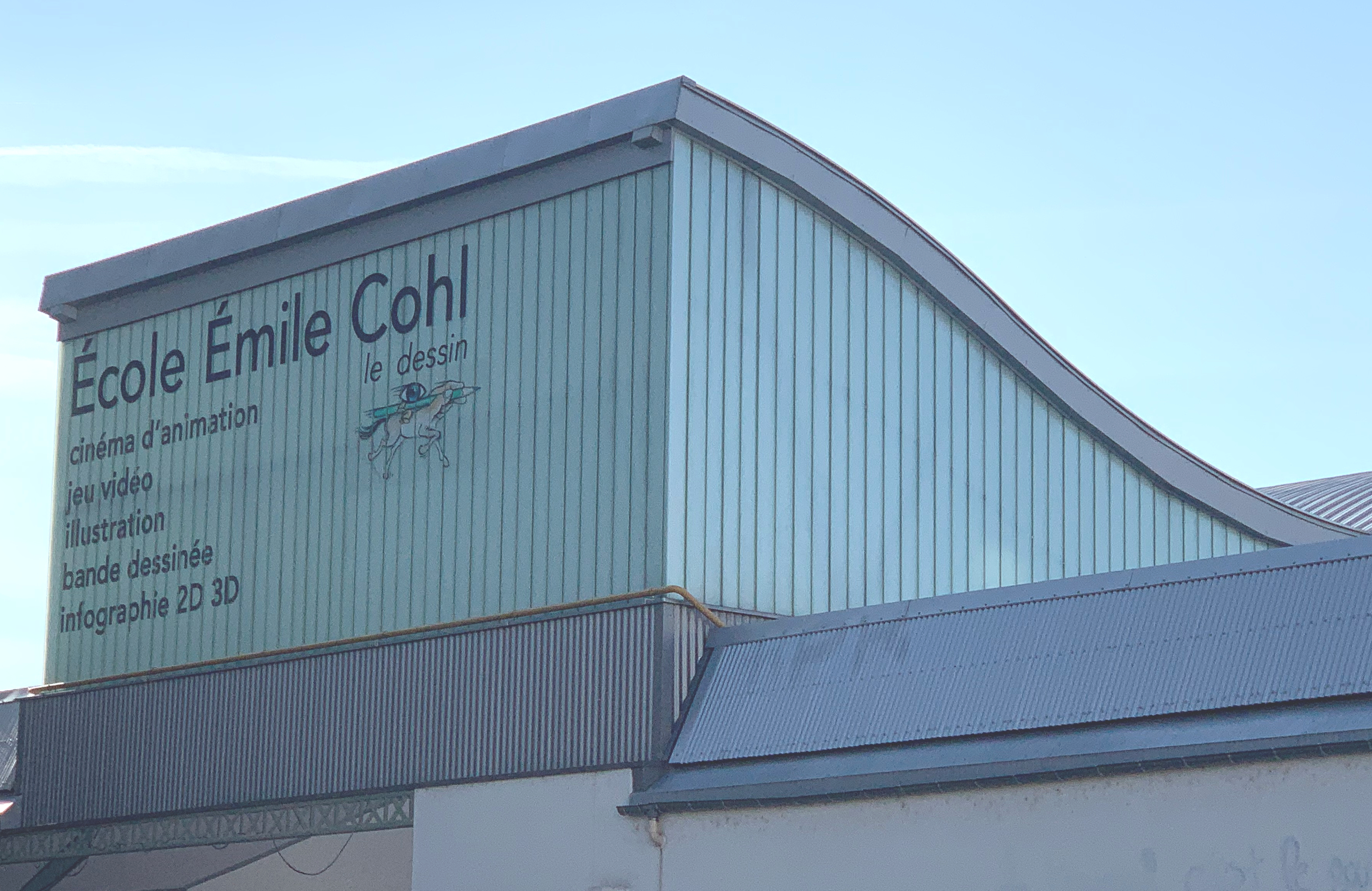
- Type: Art school
- Established: 1984
- Location: Lyon, France; 45.7488°N 4.8760°E

École Émile-Cohl is a French art school. It is a private higher education institution recognized by the state and specialized in teaching drawing and illustration, animation film, video games, multimedia computer graphics, comics and press drawing.

== History ==
École Émile-Cohl was founded in 1984. It is named after Émile Cohl.

== Courses ==
It organizes short courses for the general public and professionals, including watercolour, comics, youth illustration, engraving, cartoon, travel diary, matte painting.

In the final year of studies, students have access to a recruitment day with 60 companies (animation studios, publishers, video game development studios, visual communication agencies).

== Famous teachers and students ==
- Vincent Dutrait
- Daphné Collignon
- Aurélie Neyret
- Pierre Perifel
- Béatrice Tillier
- Juan Pablo Machado
