= Nocturna (film) =

2007 Spanish animated fantasy film

- Theatrical release poster
- Directed by: Adrià García; Víctor Maldonado
- Written by: Adrià García; Víctor Maldonado
- Produced by: Julio Fernández; Philippe Garrell
- Music by: Nicolas Errèra
- Production companies: Filmax Animation; AnimaKids Productions; Castelao Productions, S.A; Bren Entertainment, S.A; Gébéka Films; TVE; Canal+; Cine Cinema
- Distributed by: Filmax (Spain); Gébéka Films (France)
- Release date: 11 October 2007
- Running time: 88 minutes
- Countries: Spain; France
- Language: Spanish

Nocturna is a 2007 Spanish animated fantasy film directed by Adrià García and Víctor Maldonado. The film was produced in 2007 by Filmax Animation and AnimaKids Productions.

== Plot ==
Tim, a young boy living in a dilapidated orphanage, is bullied for his fear of the dark. At night, he sneaks onto the roof of the orphanage to gaze up at the stars in the sky.

When Tim is too afraid to retrieve a ball from the basement, the other children retaliate by stealing the doorknob he uses to gain access to the roof, forcing Tim to find a different route to the rooftop. When he eventually manages to climb back up to the roof, he notices his favorite star suddenly disappear.

Shortly after, Tim meets a large, ape-like figure called the Cat Shepherd, who herds cats to protect children. A narcoleptic cat named Tobermory, becomes Tim's personal guardian. Tim convinces the Cat Shepherd to help find out what is happening to the stars.

The Sheperd takes Tim to see Moka, the guardian of the night within the Night World and pleads for him to return the stars to the night sky. Moka pays scarce attention to the boy's pleas, so Tim asks the Cat Shepherd to take him to the Lighthouse of the Stars, where he thinks he may find the answer to the strange phenomena.

Tim, the Shepherd, and Tobermory race against the clock through the streets of Nocturna, a world in which creatures of all shapes and sizes work to create the night as we all know it. An ominous threat, known as "The Darkness", is putting the night and the inhabitants of Nocturna in danger by causing children to become restless or have nightmares.

As Tim continues his investigation into the disappearing stars, he discovers that The Darkness was created through his fear of the dark. After tricking the Darkness into approaching him, Tim manages to overcome his fear, defeat The Darkness, and save Nocturna. The next day, Tim surprises his friends by retrieving the ball from the basement. Impressed, they decide to play with him again.

== Critical reception ==
Upon its release in France at the end of October 2007, the film received favorable reviews from critics. Among the most positive reviews was that of Studio Magazine, which rated the film 3.5 out of 5, describing it as as original as it is poetic, appreciating its universe (comparing it to the cinema of Guillermo del Toro) as well as its subtle evocation of the fear of the dark. Ouest-France gave the film three stars out of four, praising the a beautifully original atmosphere of poetry and dream, concocted by a very inspired duo of Spanish authors. In Télérama, Cécile Mury appreciated the novel and coherent aesthetic universe that results from numerous influences, from Jules Verne to Caro and Jeunet or Tim Burton. She analyzed the film's creative approach (imagining a coherent universe to explain all the fears and nocturnal incidents dreaded by small children), comparing it to Monsters, Inc. by Pixar, and found the result ideal for alleviating night terrors and stimulating dreams. More nuanced, Renaud Baronian and Pierre Vavasseur, in Le Parisien, stated: This astonishing digression on the night terrors of young children is supported by a lovely old-fashioned graphic style, inspired by Hayao Miyazaki, Tim Burton, and Murnau, although it does not reach the level of these great masters of the 7th art. However, this first film (...) is still worth a visit.

== Awards ==
Nocturna, la nuit magique won two awards: the Best Animated Film prize at the Barcelona Film Festival in 2007, and the Goya Award for Best Animated Film in 2008. Additionally, it was part of the official selection out of competition for the Italian Venice Film Festival in 2007 as well as being included in the Official Feature Film Competition at the 2008 Annecy Film Festival.

== Release ==
In France, the film was released on DVD by France Télévisions Éditions in 2008. A Blu-Ray edition was released on 11 November 2014 by GKIDS, but is now out of print.

== See also ==
- List of animated feature films
