= National Museum of Beirut =

Museum in Lebanon

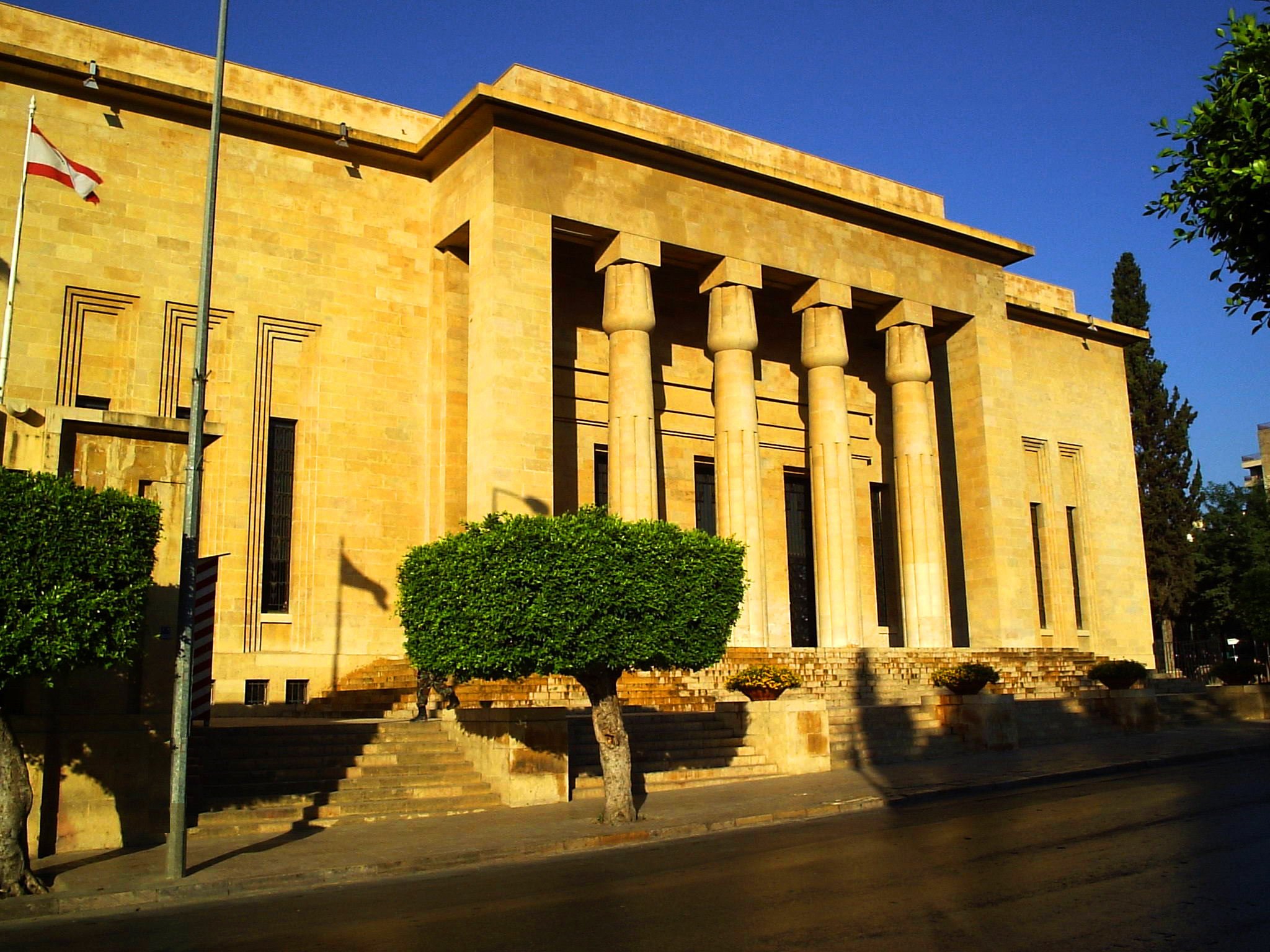
- The facade of the National Museum of Beirut

- Location within Beirut Location within Lebanon
- Established: 1937
- Location: Beirut, Lebanon
- Coordinates: 33.878384°N 35.514959°E
- Type: Archaeological
- Visitors: 40,211 (2009)
- Director: Anne-Marie Ofeish

The National Museum of Beirut (Arabic: متحف بيروت الوطنيّ, Matḥaf Bayrūt al-waṭanī) is the principal museum of archaeology in Lebanon. The collection begun after World War I, and the museum was officially opened in 1942. The museum has collections totaling about 100,000 objects, most of which are antiquities and medieval finds from excavations undertaken by the Directorate General of Antiquities.

During the 1975 Lebanese Civil War, the museum stood on the front line that separated the warring factions. The museum's Egyptian Revival building and its collection suffered extensive damage in the war, but most of the artifacts were saved by last-minute preemptive measures. Today, after a major renovation, the National Museum of Beirut has regained its former position, with about 1,800 artifacts exhibited ranging in date from prehistoric times to the medieval Mamluk period.

== History ==
=== Origin ===
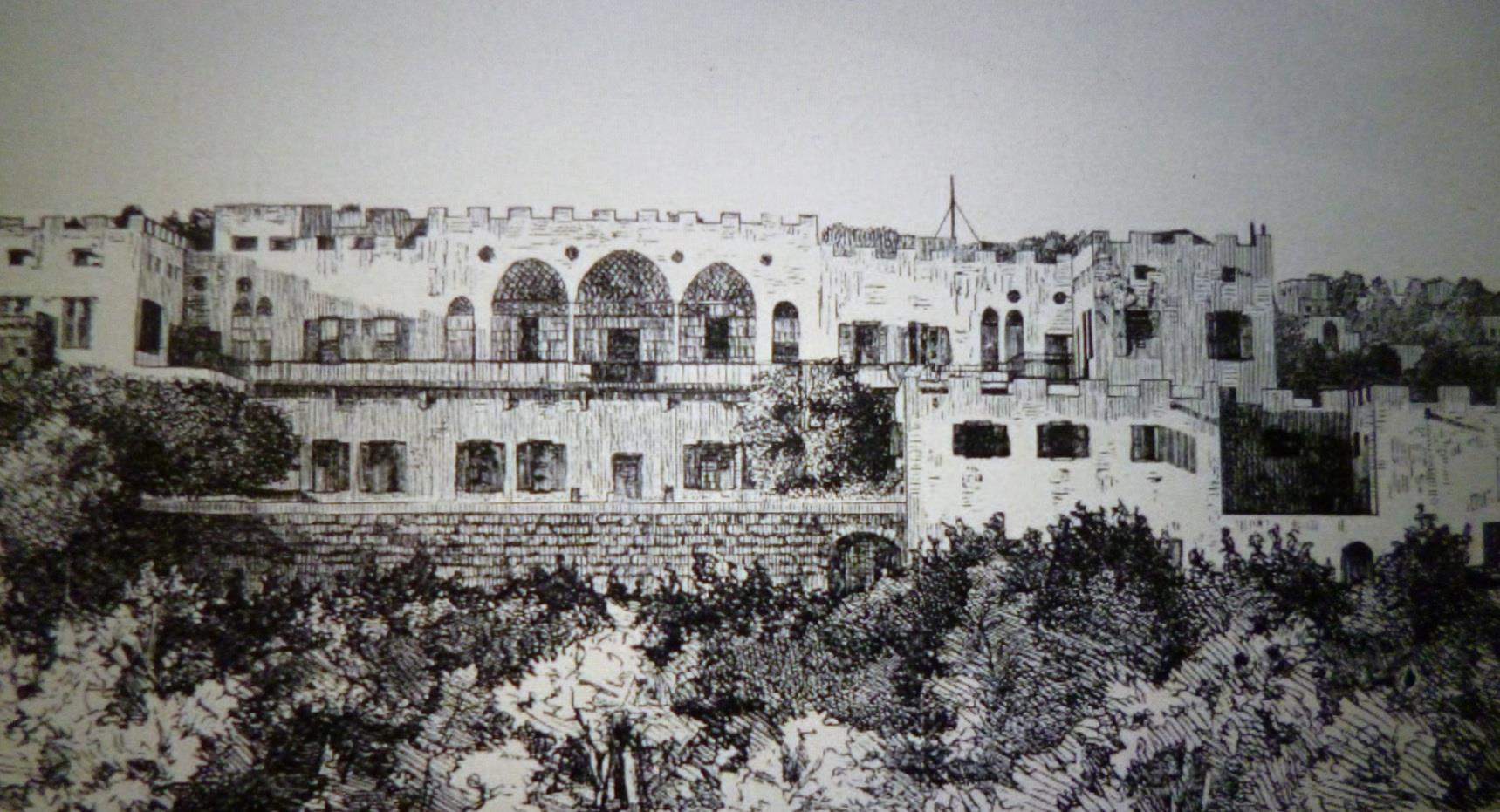
19th century engraving of the Kaiserswerth deaconesses building in Beirut

In 1919, a small group of ancient artifacts collected by Raymond Weill, a French officer stationed in Lebanon, was exhibited at a provisional museum in the Kaiserswerth Deaconesses' building in Georges Picot Street, Beirut. Meanwhile, a forerunner of the Archaeological and Fine Arts Service began to assemble items from the region round Beirut. The initial collection was rapidly expanded under successive antiquity directors with the addition of finds from the excavations led by Dr. Georges Contenau at Saida and Ernest Renan at Saida, Tyre and Byblos. Donations of private collections included those of Henry Seyrig's coin collection, General Weygand in 1925 and George Alfred Ford, the director of the American Mission School of Sidon, posthumously in 1930.

=== Foundation ===
In 1923, the "Friends of the Museum Committee", headed by Bechara El Khoury, then Prime Minister and minister of education and fine arts, was created to raise funds to build a national museum. The founding committee included: Alfred Sursok, Marius Hanemoglou, Albert Bassoul, Omar Daouk, Kamil Eddeh, Ali Jumblat, Henry Pharaoun, George Faissy, Assad Younes, Hassan Makhzoumi, Joseph Farahi, George Korom, Jean Debs, Wafik Beydoun and Jack Tabet. The committee accepted the plans presented by architects Antoine Nahas and Pierre Leprince-Ringuet. Construction began in 1930 on a plot of land donated by the municipality near the Beirut Hippodrome, and was completed in 1937. The opening of the museum was scheduled for 1938, but was postponed because of the political situation in the lead-up to World War II. The National Museum of Beirut was finally opened on May 27, 1942, by President Alfred Naqqache. Until 1928, the conservation of the Lebanese National Museum was put in the hands of Charles Virolleaud, the director of the service of antiquities and Philippe de Tarrazi, the Lebanese conservator of the National Library. The collection continued to grow under the direction of Mir Maurice Chehab, head curator for 33 years, until the start of the Lebanese Civil War in 1975.

=== Closing and devastation ===
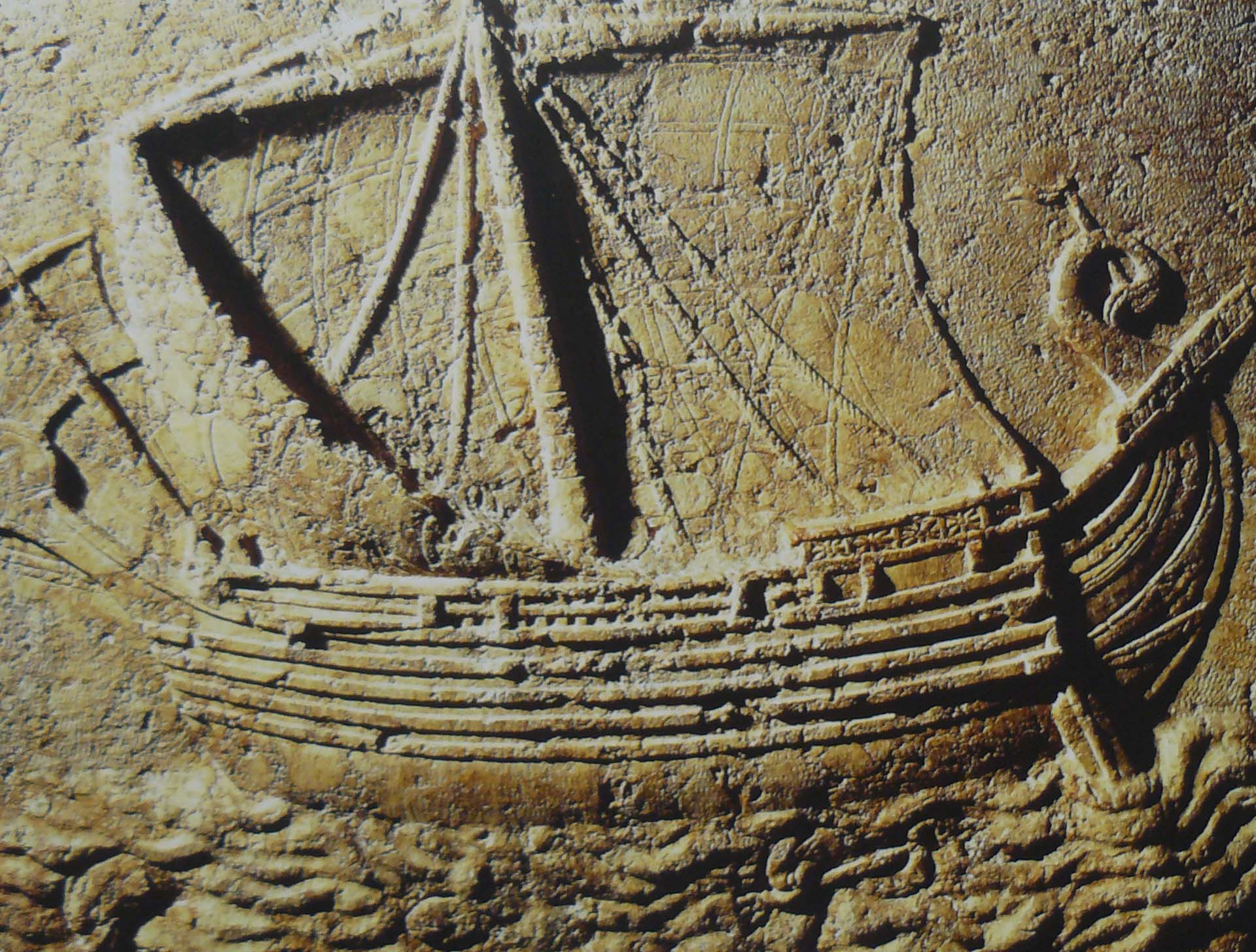
The Ship sarcophagus: a sarcophagus showing a Phoenician ship, Sidon, 2nd century CE

In 1975, with the outbreak of the Lebanese war, Beirut was split into two opposing areas. The national museum and the directorate general of antiquities were on the demarcation line known as "Museum alley" which separated the warring militias and armies. Conditions in the immediate vicinity of the museum rapidly worsened, as the museum endured shelling and bombing, and was turned into a barracks for combatants. "Museum alley" became a checkpoint controlled by various Lebanese militias, or the Syrian or Israeli armies, who opened and closed the road under short-lived truces. The authorities decided to close the museum. The first protective measures inside the museum were initiated by Mir Maurice Chehab and his wife during alternating fire-fights and moments of truce. The vulnerable small artifacts were removed from their showcases and hidden in storerooms in the basement, which was then walled up, banning any access to the lower floors. On the ground floor, mosaics which had been installed in the floor were covered with a layer of concrete. Statues and sarcophagi were protected by sandbags. When the situation reached its worst in 1982, the heavier artifacts were encased in wood and concrete.

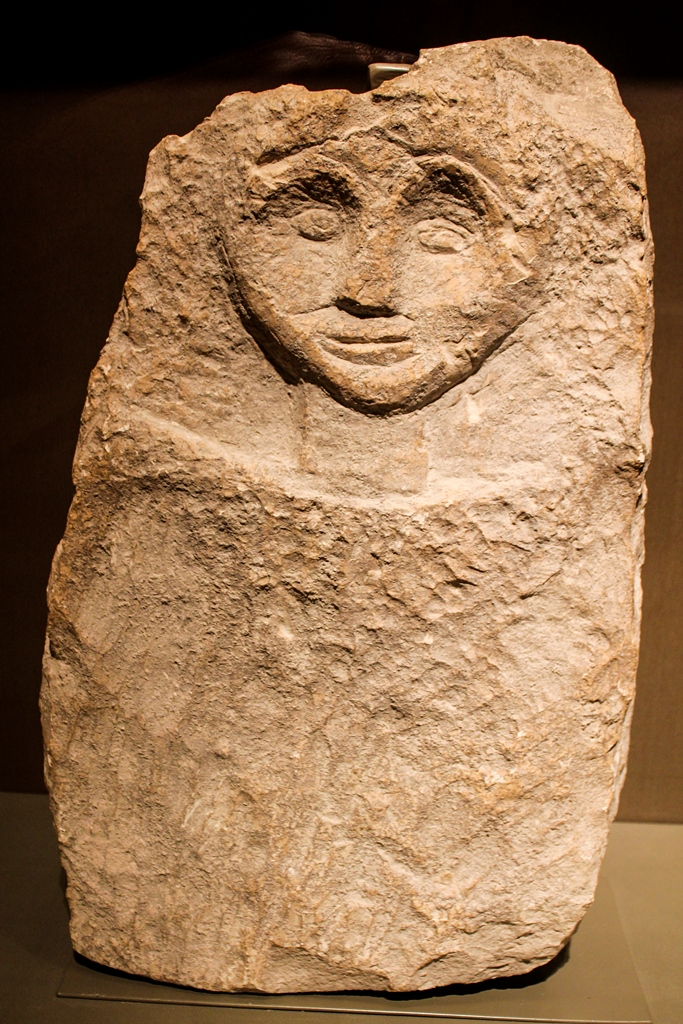
Tyre Phoenician necropolis stela

When the final cease-fire was declared in 1991, the museum and the Directorate General of Antiquities were in a state of near-destruction. The museum was flooded with rainwater and the outer facade was badly marked by bullets and craters from shells. Militiamen who occupied the premises had covered the internal walls with graffiti. The state of the museum collection was also very serious: the small objects had been left in the storerooms for more than fifteen years in a totally inappropriate environment. The national museum had been built on a high water table, which caused a dangerous increase in humidity, and collection of water inside the storerooms. The large stone artifacts has been left in their emergency casings without any ventilation and traces of corrosion from salts were visible on the lower edges of the stone monuments. The wing adjacent to the Directorate General of Antiquities was devastated by shells which started a fire, destroying documents such as maps, photographs, and records, as well as 45 boxes containing archaeological objects. All of the laboratory equipment was lost. During the war, some items were looted and are now exhibited in Turkish museums, whilst others have been auctioned. Ironically, these had been stolen from external stores, mainly in Byblos and Sidon, in which they were kept to avoid damage and looting.

=== Reopening and renovation ===
The first plans to restore the national museum came in 1992 from Michel Edde, then Minister of Culture and Higher Education. The proposal to tear down the concrete walls and cases which protected the national treasures was turned down by the general director of antiquities, Camille Asmar, since the museum still had no doors or windows to prevent further looting. Ghassan Tueni donated the funds for the museum's massive new main door. Once the doors and windows were put in, the decision was made to pull down the concrete wall that protected the entrance to the basement. Restoration work started in 1995 and focused on the building itself, and the inventorying and restoration of the collection. The museum was officially inaugurated on November 25, 1997, by then president Elias Hrawi but only parts of the ground floor and basement were made accessible since the remainder of the building was still under repair and important modifications were needed to meet the requirements of modern museology standards. The museum was again closed to the public in July 1998 to achieve restoration works. On October 8, 1999, the museum re-opened its doors to the public under the patronage of president Emile Lahoud.

The rehabilitation of the National Museum was undertaken by the Ministry of Culture, the Directorate General of Antiquities and the National Heritage Foundation, to the plans of the French architect, urban planner and designer Jean-Michel Wilmotte. In 1999 the Lebanese government started a massive campaign to recover antiquities that were stolen or traded during the civil war. Many artifacts were recovered from warehouses or private homes since Lebanese law dictates that any item more than 300 years old belongs to the state. In 2011, the ground floor restoration lab was moved and a new exhibition hall, named after prince Maurice Chehab was opened to the public.

=== Basement reopening ===
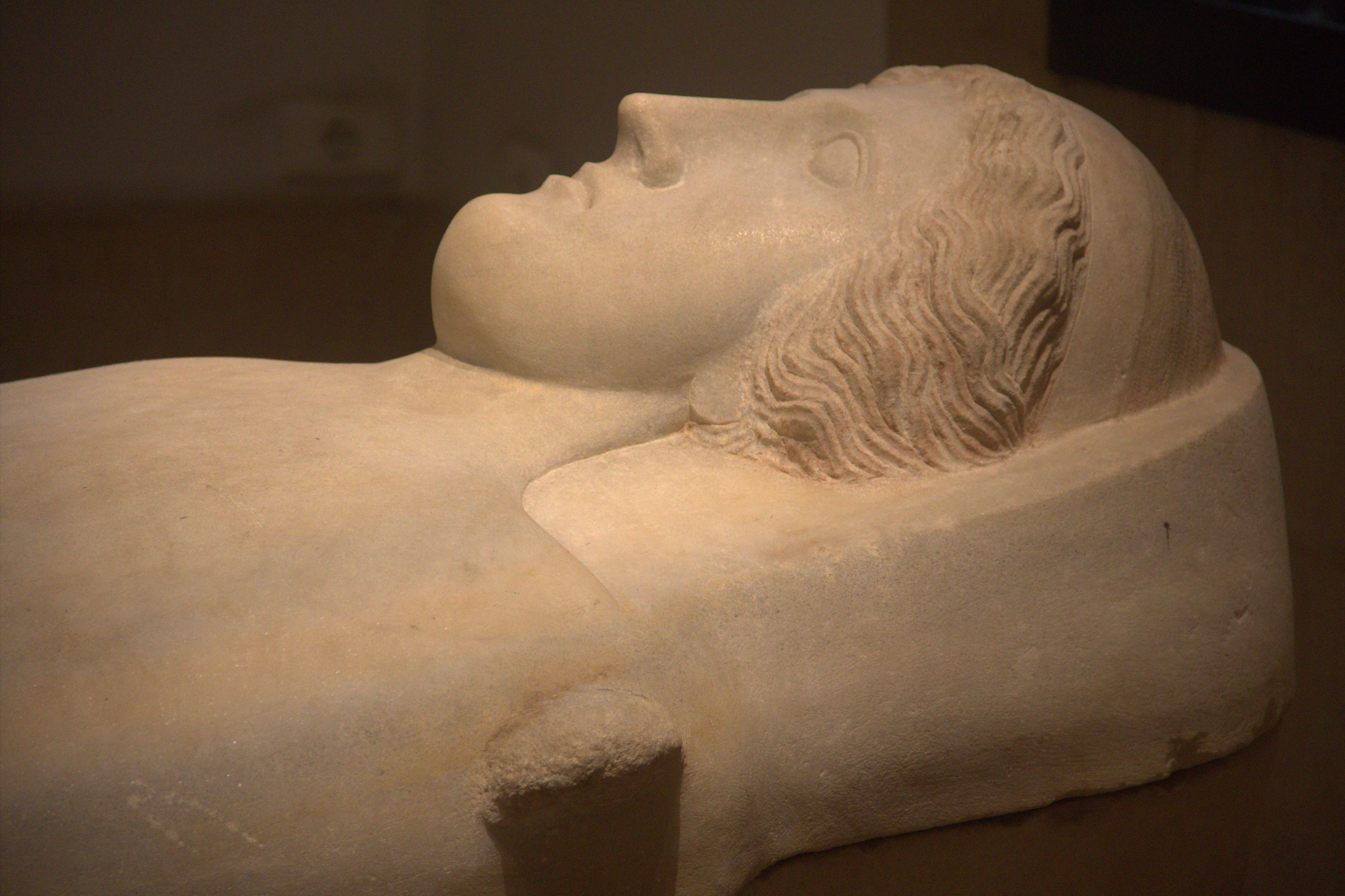
One of the anthropomorphic sarcophagi from the Ford collection, marble, 4th century BC

Opening of the underground gallery was scheduled for November 2010, but was delayed for technical and financial difficulties. Restoration works for the 700 square metres (7,500 sq ft) floor were begun in 2014 under the initiative of Lebanese culture minister Rony Araiji and were carried out with financial and technical support from the Italian government who provided €1.2 million for the project through the Italian Development Cooperation. The basement was finally reopened on October 7, 2016, with an official ceremony presided by Tammam Salam, the Lebanese prime minister and the Italian Minister of Foreign Affairs and International Cooperation Paolo Gentiloni.

The basement collection showcases funerary art and practices beginning with articles dating back from prehistory until the Ottoman era. Collection highlights include 31 Phoenician anthropomorphic sarcophagi from the Ford collection, a fresco depicting Mary the mother of Jesus dated to c. 240 CE, and which is believed to be one of the oldest discovered representations of Mary in the world. Other artifacts of note are the naturally preserved Maronite mummies of ‘Assi el Hadath cave in the Qadisha valley and the frescoed tomb of Tyre.

=== Closing after the Beirut explosion ===
In the 2020 Beirut explosion, the museum's windows and doors were destroyed and the security system was damaged. The museum reopened in August 2021 through the help from the Louvre Department of Near Eastern Antiquities and Department of Architectural Heritage and Gardens and $175,000 in funding provided by the Alliance for the Protection of Heritage in Conflict Areas. In 2025, the museum opened the Nuhad es-Said Pavilion for Culture. The addition was inspired by plans created in 1928, which included a second wing that was connected to the existing building. The new pavilion was designed by Raed Abillama.

== Architecture ==
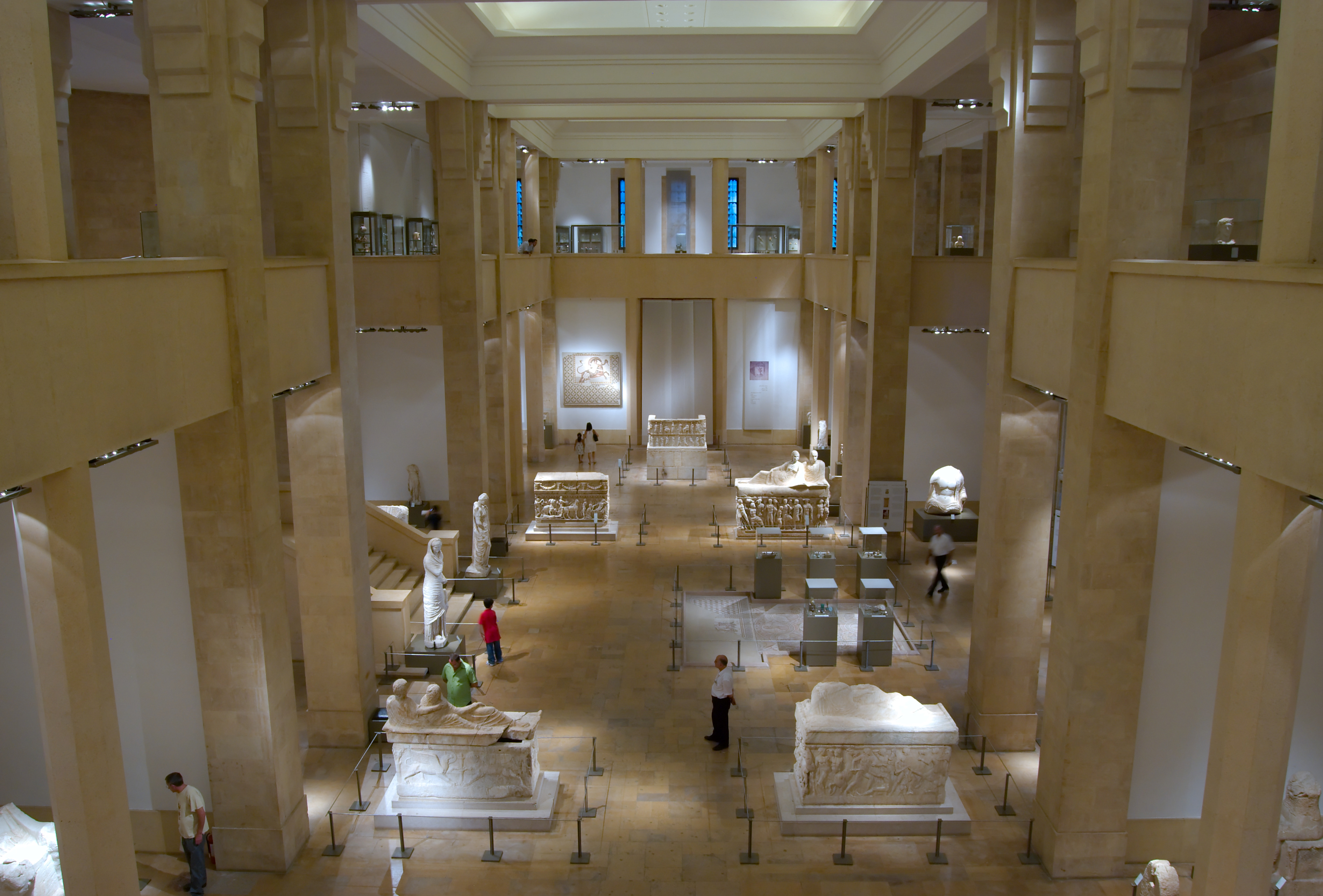
Museum interior

The museum was designed in a French inspired Egyptian Revival architecture by the architects Antoine Nahas and Pierre Leprince-Ringuet, and built with Lebanese ochre limestone. It comprises a basement, a ground floor, a mezzanine floor and a terrace; the central block is covered by a glass roof, above the mezzanine, giving natural overhead light.

The whole site is approximately 5,500 square metres (59,000 sq ft), and the exhibition floor space totals 6,000 square metres (65,000 sq ft). The immediately adjoining museum annexes and administrative offices occupy about 1,000 square metres (11,000 sq ft).

The preservation of cultural heritage sites was greatly assisted by landscape architects, who worked to incorporate historical sites into the planning of public areas and provide fresh ways for residents to interact with one other, also essential for preserving its identity especially in museums.

== Collections ==
The National Museum of Beirut currently exhibits 1,300 artifacts from its collection of approximately 100,000 objects. The museum displays follow a chronological circuit beginning in Prehistory and ending in the Ottoman era. The circuit begins on the ground floor where 83 large objects are displayed, these include sarcophagi, mosaics statues and reliefs. The upper floor displays 1,243 small and medium-sized artifacts arranged by chronological order and by theme in modern showcases with soft lighting and magnifying glasses that emphasize the aesthetic aspect of the artifacts.

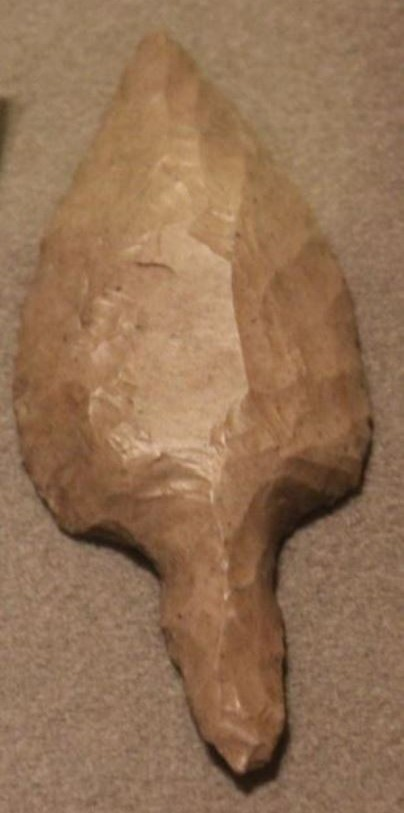
Neolithic Flint point from Byblos

=== Prehistory ===
The collection has prehistoric artifacts from early hunter-gatherer societies ranging from the Lower Paleolithic (1M–150,000 BC) to the Neolithic (9000–3200 BC), typically spearheads, flints, hooks and pottery. These were found in caves and rock shelters all over Lebanese territory. Around five hundred prehistoric sites have been surveyed in Lebanon as a whole, and around fifty sites in Beirut itself.

=== Bronze Age ===
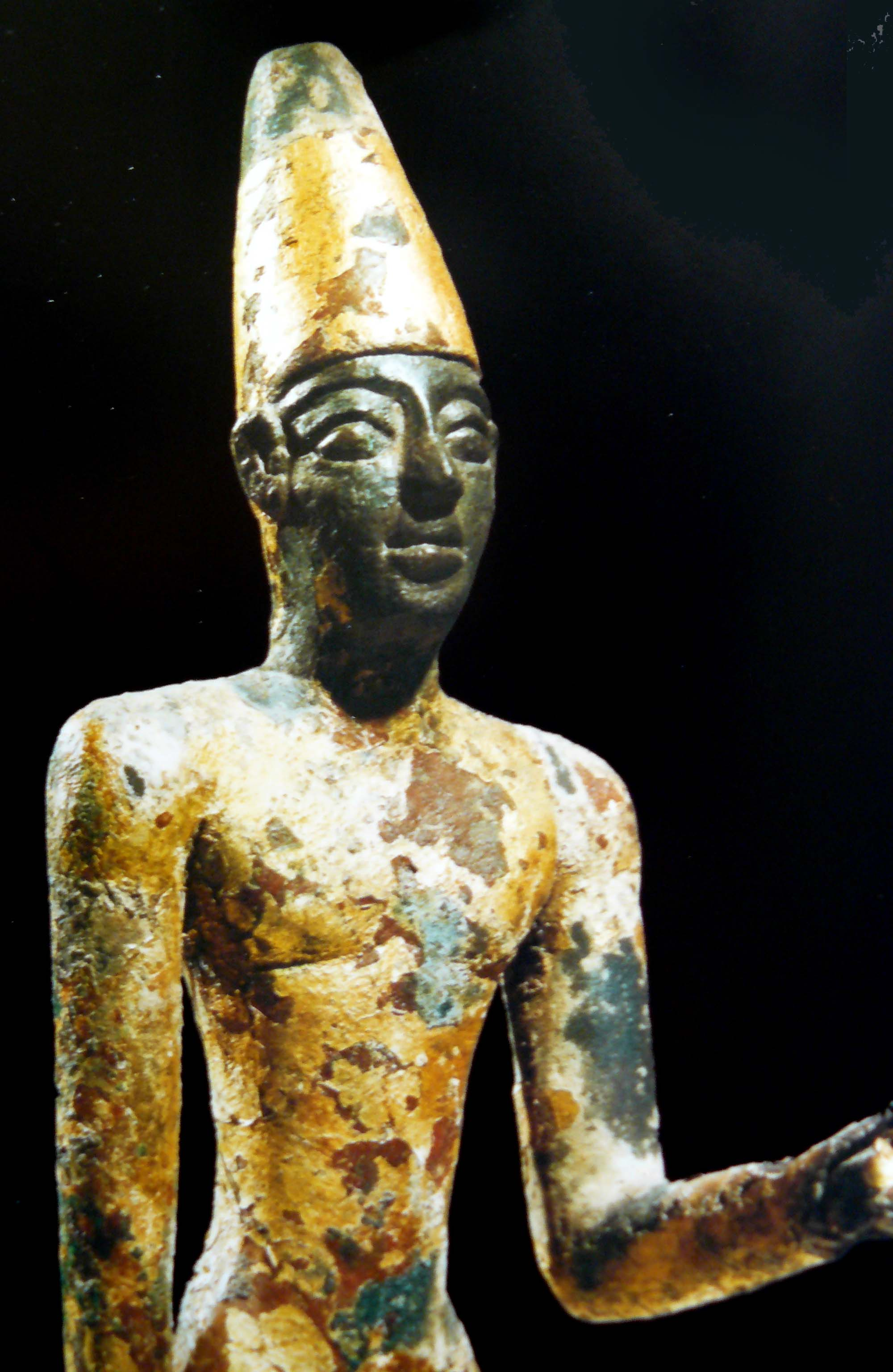
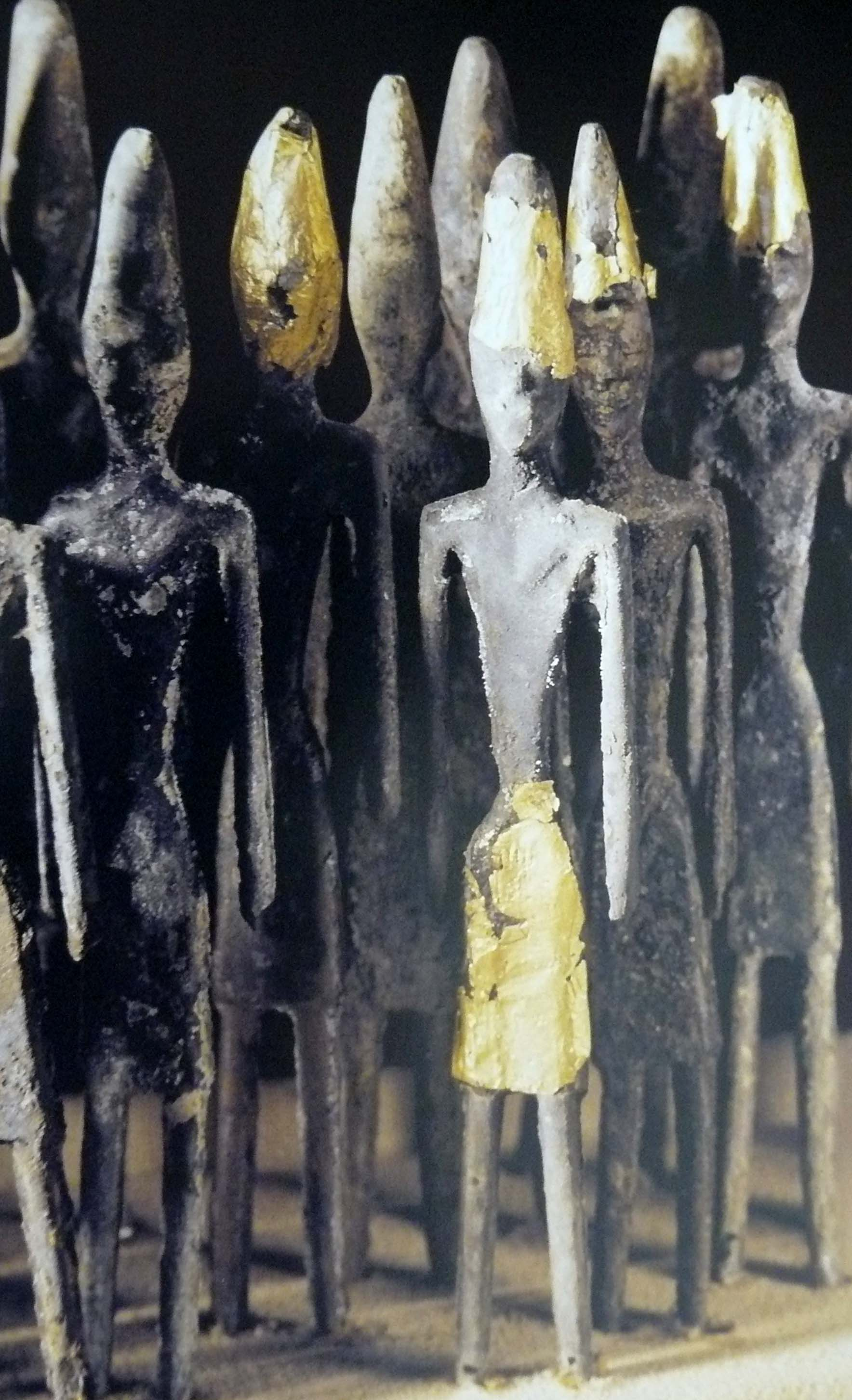
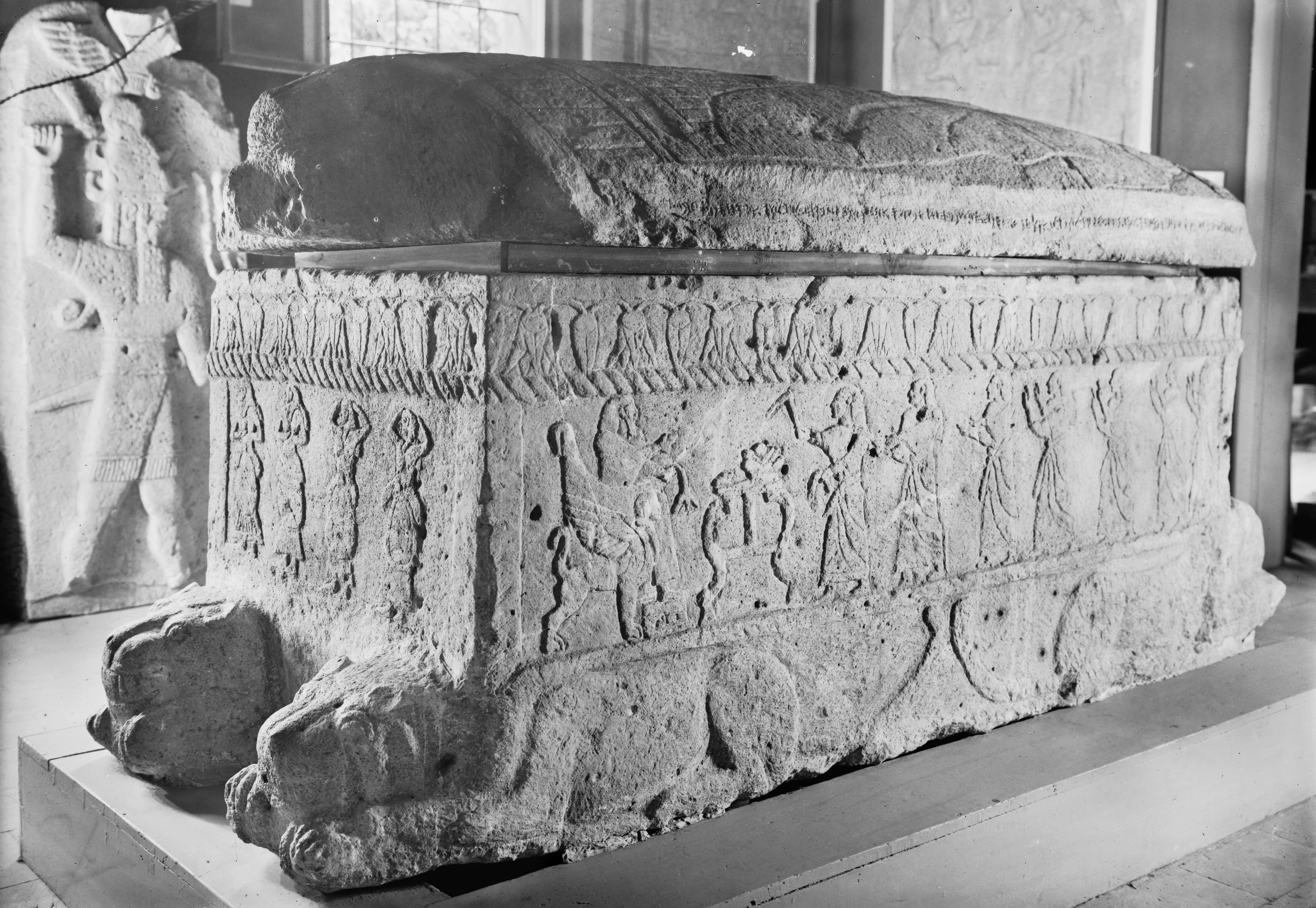
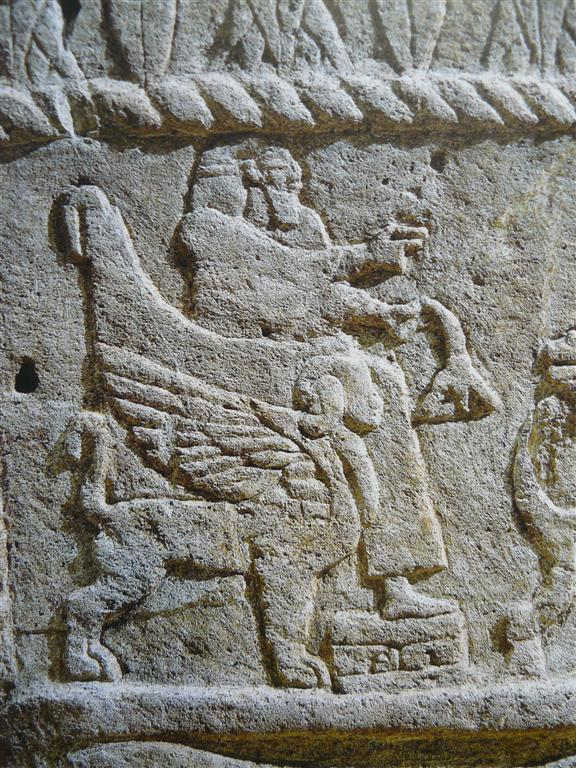
Bronze Age Byblos:
Top row: the Byblos figurines: 19-18th century BC gilded bronze statuette of Phoenician divinity Reshep, and votive gilded bronze statuettes
Bottom row: 10th-11th century BC limestone sarcophagus of King Ahiram, Byblos

The Bronze Age (3200–1200 BC) saw the birth of Lebanon's first fortified villages, the development of commercial and maritime activities and the invention of the world's first alphabet in Byblos. This collection includes the museum's masterpiece: the sarcophagus of Ahiram, which holds the oldest text written in the Phoenician alphabet.

Collection highlights:

- From the Temple of the Obelisks in Byblos:
  - The Byblos figurines: gilded bronze, Obelisk temple – Byblos, 19-18th century BC.
  - Decorated knife:gold and ivory, Obelisk temple – Byblos, 19-18th century BC.
  - Fenestrated axes: gold, Obelisk temple – Byblos, 19-18th century BC.
  - Statuette of Reshep: gilded bronze, Obelisk temple – Byblos, 19-18th century BC.
  - Abishemu obelisk:
- From the Byblos royal cemetery:
  - Ahiram sarcophagus: limestone, Byblos royal cemetery, 10th century BC.
  - King Ip Shemu Abi's crown and scepter: gold and bronze, Royal cemetery, Byblos, 18th century BC.
  - King Abi Shemu's jewelry collection: gold and precious stones, Royal cemetery, Byblos, 18th century BC.
- Duck shaped cosmetic box: ivory, Sidon, 14th century BC.

=== Iron Age ===
The Iron Age (1200–333 BC) in Lebanon saw the climax of the Phoenician civilization, which culminated in its maritime expansion and the transmission to other cultures of the alphabet (which was attributed by the Greek legend to the Tyrian Cadmus). During this period, after an era of autonomy, the city-states of the area came under Assyrian, Babylonian and Persian hegemony. The occupying civilizations influenced Phoenician ceramics, jewelry and ivory work, statues, and sarcophagi.

Key highlights of the collections include:

- the Ford Collection sarcophagi: marble, 4th century BC.
- votive statues from the Temple of Eshmun: marble, Bustan esh Sheikh, 4th century BC.
- capital with bull protomes,: marble, Sidon, 5th century BC.

=== Hellenistic period ===
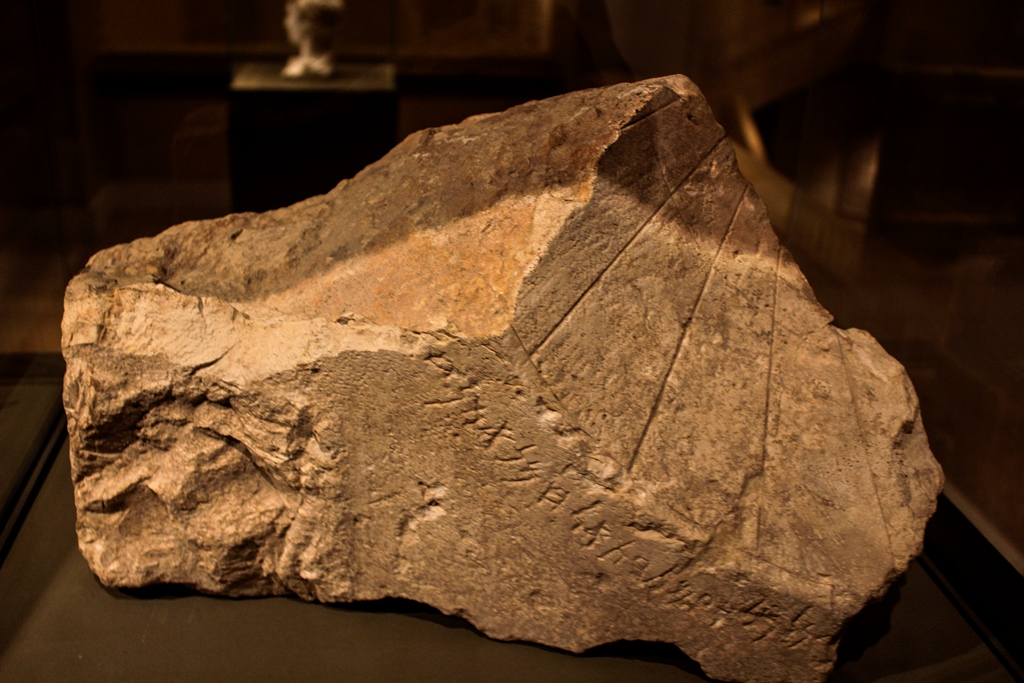
Limestone Phoenician sundial with inscriptions from Umm al-Amad

The Hellenistic period (333–64 BC). In 333 BC, the decisive victory won by Alexander the Great over the Persian king Darius III opened Phoenicia to the Greek conqueror.

After Alexander's death, Phoenicia first came under Ptolemaic rule from Egypt, then, after the Battle of Panium, under the Seleucids based in modern Iraq. The Seleucids abolished local monarchies, and appointed governors (bearing Greek names) to rule the Phoenician cities.

Greek influence, which had made its way to Phoenicia during the Persian period, now became stronger. Figurines found in the Phoenician Sanctuary of Kharayeb show Aegean influence on local craftsmen. This spreading Hellenization interacted with the local Semitic population substratum, which remained faithful to its gods and its language. It resulted in an artistic and architectural symbiosis best illustrated in the artifacts of Umm al-Amad and Bustan esh Sheikh.

Collection highlights:

- Sanctuary of Eshmun tribune: marble, Bustan esh Sheikh (near Sidon), ca. 350 BCE.
- Statue of Aphrodite: marble, Beirut.
- Greek gods figurines: terracotta, Kharayeb.
- Multiple Thrones of Astarte from around Lebanon.

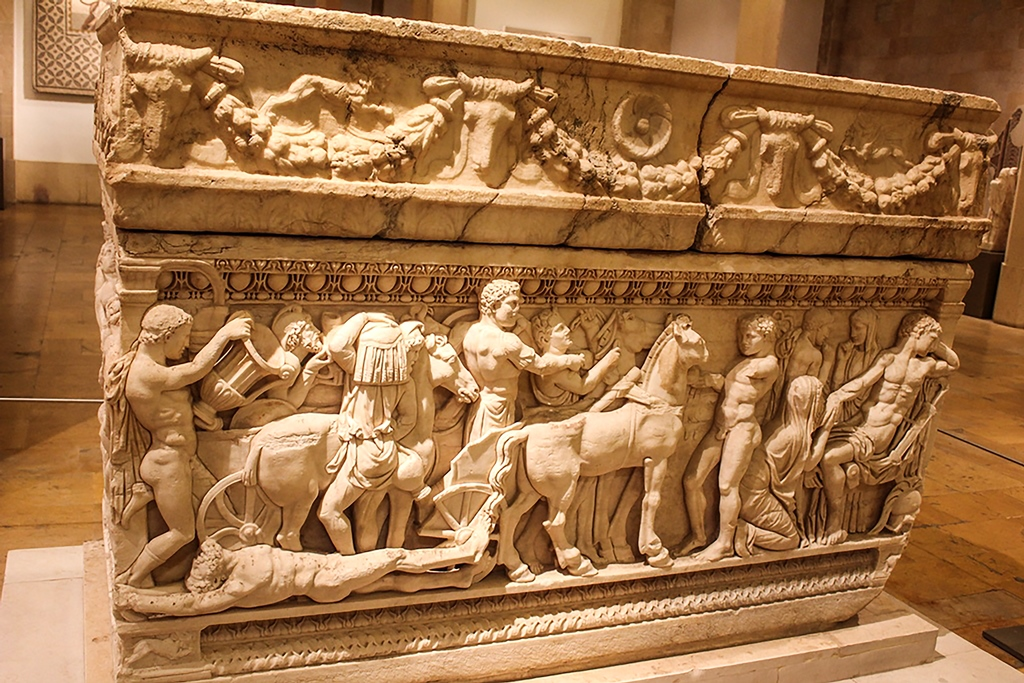
Sarcophagus with Achilles legend

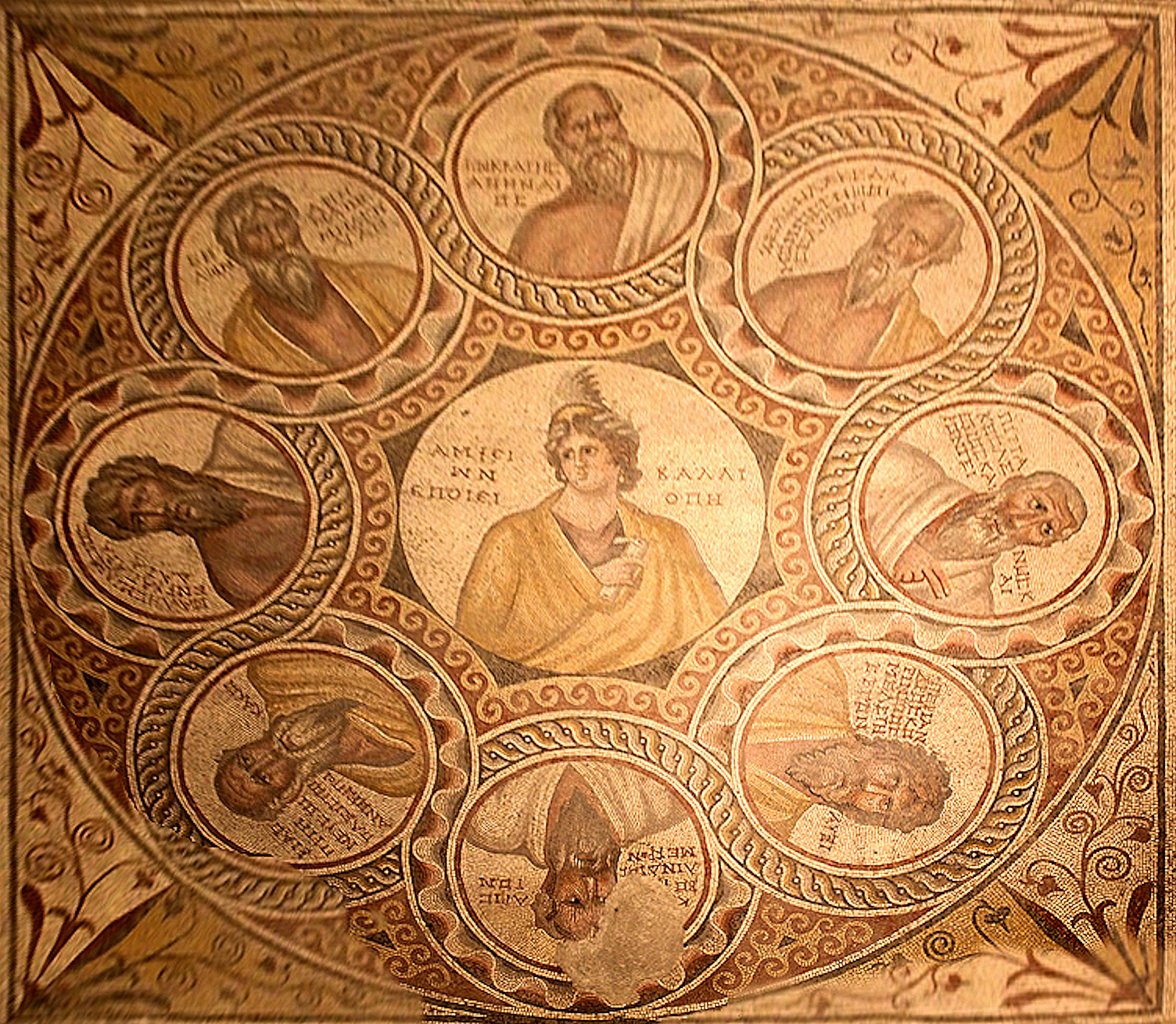
Seven Wise Men Mosaic: Calliope, surrounded by Socrates and seven wise men (Baalbeck, 3rd century AD)

=== Roman period ===
In 64 BC, the military expedition of the Roman general Pompey put an end to the anarchy prevailing in the Seleucid Empire, and Phoenicia became part of the Roman world. But Roman civil wars continued to disrupt the region until 31 BC, after which, with the reign of Augustus, the Pax Romana extended over the area. The Pax Romana favored international trade, and local industries in silversmithing, glass, textiles and ceramics developed.

Roman Period (64 BC–395 CE) section collection highlights include:

- Achilles sarcophagus: marble, Tyre, 2nd century CE.
- Drunken Cupids sarcophagus: marble, Tyre, 2nd century CE.
- Abduction of Europe mosaic: Byblos, 3rd century CE.
- Statue of Hygieia: marble, Byblos.
- Calliope and the seven wise men mosaic: Baalbeck, 3rd century CE.
- Dionysus bust: marble, Tyre, 3rd century CE.

=== Byzantine period ===
After the death of Theodosius I in 395 CE, the Roman Empire was divided into a western and an eastern empire. The Lebanese cities were attached to the latter, and converted to Christianity which became the state religion in 392. The emperor ordered the destruction of pagan temples, but cults like those of Adonis and Jupiter Optimus Maxiums Heliopolitanus were kept alive by the local population and survived in some form for centuries.

Artifacts from the Byzantine period (395–636 CE) include:

- The "Jealousy" mosaic: Beirut.
- Elements of a church chancel: marble, Beirut.
- Coins and jewelry collection.

=== Arab conquest, Mamluk period ===
The Arab conquest of Lebanon was completed in 637 CE. The expansion of the coastal cities, which had slowed down after earthquakes in the 6th century, revived during the Umayyad period. Their harbors and shipyards showed renewed activity, and the hinterland saw extensive irrigation work for agriculture.

Lebanon was directly affected by the various dynastic changes which brought to power successively the Umayyads, Abbasids, Fatimids, Seljuks, Ayyubids and Mamluks. During this long period, Islam spread and Arabic became the language of the administration, then progressively replaced local dialects among the population. Artifacts from the Mamluk period (636–1516 CE include coins, gold jewelry, and glazed terracotta bowls.

== Publications ==
Maurice Chehab initiated in 1936 the museum's first publication, the Bulletin du Musée de Beyrouth ("Beirut Museum Bulletin"), which reached 36 volumes before publication was stopped in 1986 by the civil war. The journal covered archaeological finds, sites and ancient civilizations. In 1995 the museum and the Lebanese British Friends of the National Museum foundation resumed publication of a bi-annual journal entitled Archaeology and History in Lebanon (ISSN 1475-5564). BAAL ("Bulletin d'Archéologie et d'Architecture Libanaise" – Lebanese Archaeology and Architecture Bulletin) is an annual journal issued by the Directorate General of Antiquities in cooperation with the Lebanese Ministry of Culture in keeping in the tradition of the Beirut Museum Bulletin. The first volume of BAAL was issued in 1996; the journal publishes research papers, excavations and archaeological surveys and reports.

== Location and facilities ==
The museum is located in Beirut's Mazra'a district on the intersection of Abdallah al-Yafi avenue and Damascus road; it is flanked by the Beirut hippodrome and the Directorate General of Antiquities building. A small theater and a gift shop flank the ground floor entry hall.

== Gallery ==
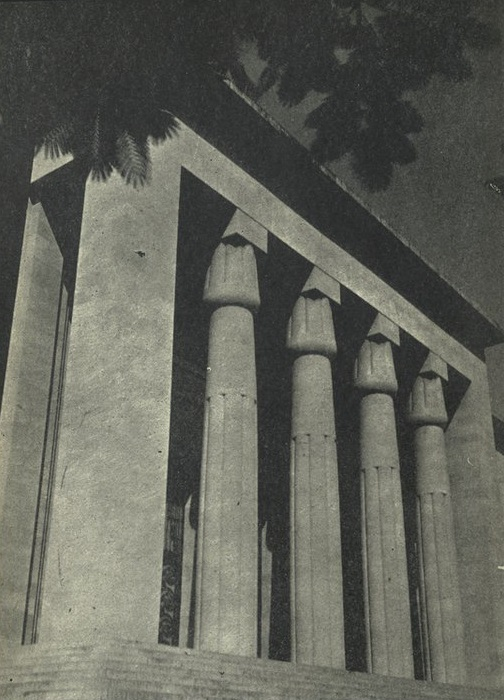
Facade in 1947

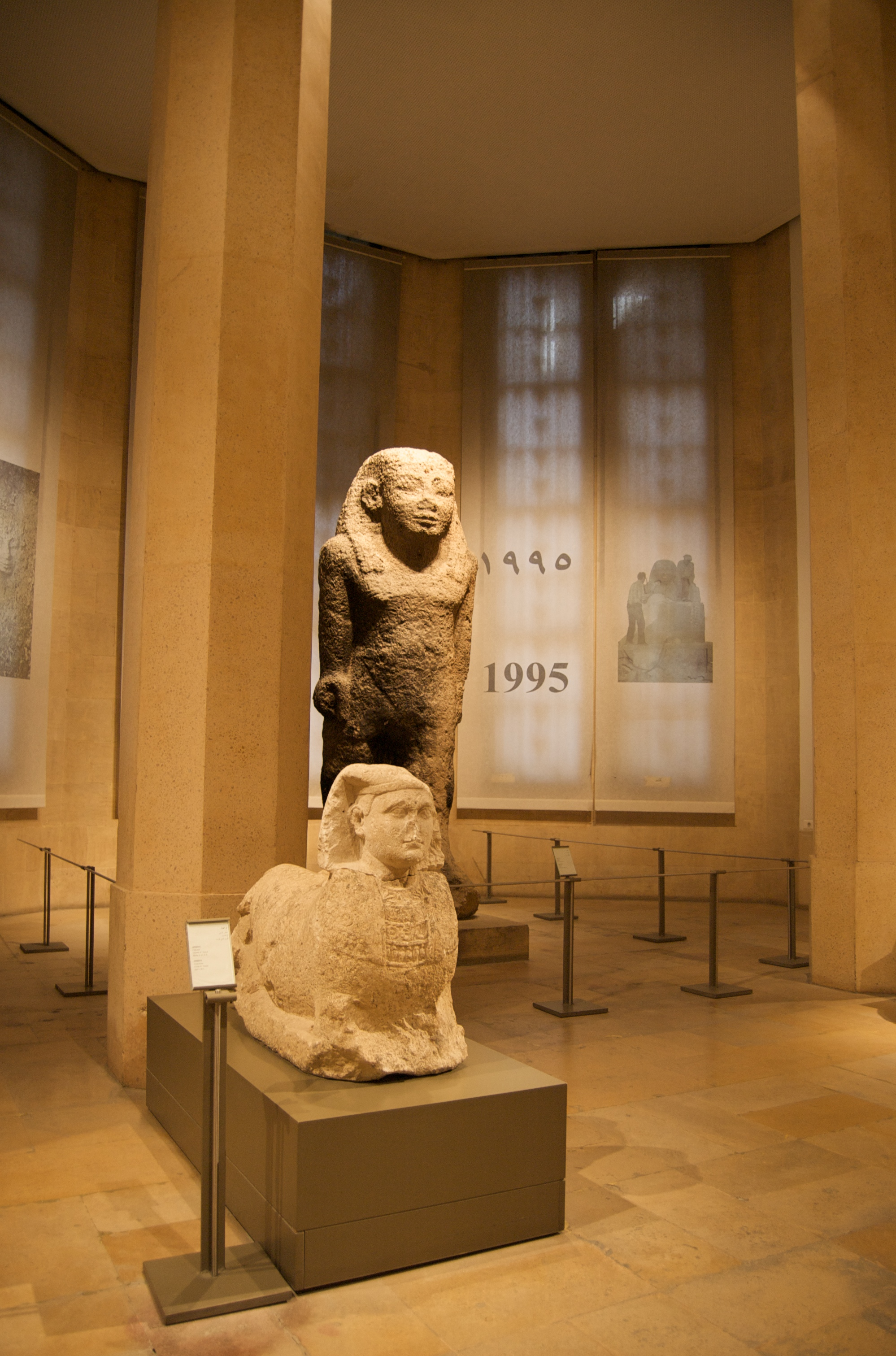
Some of the artifacts in the museum

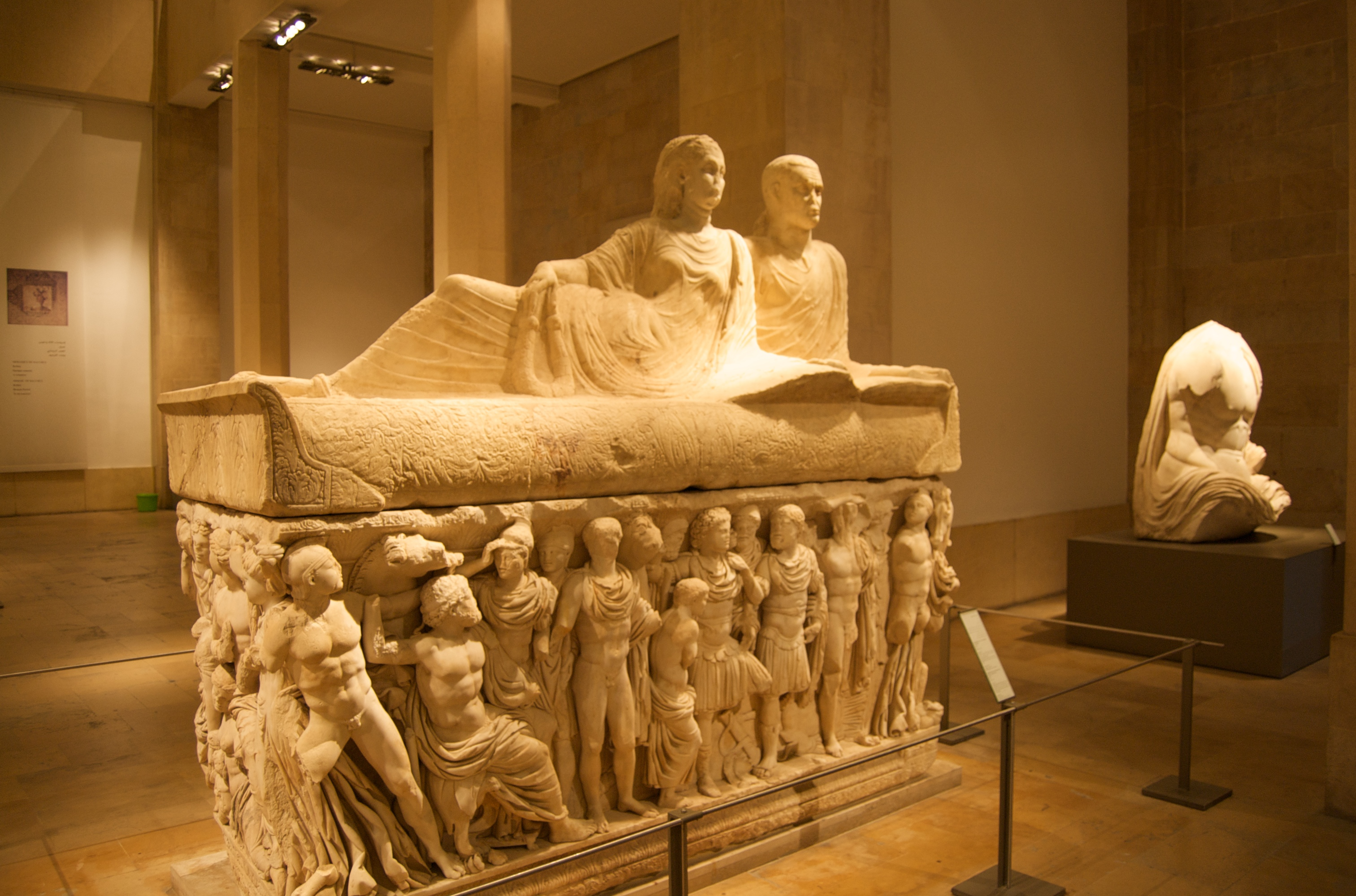
Ancient tombs displayed in the museum

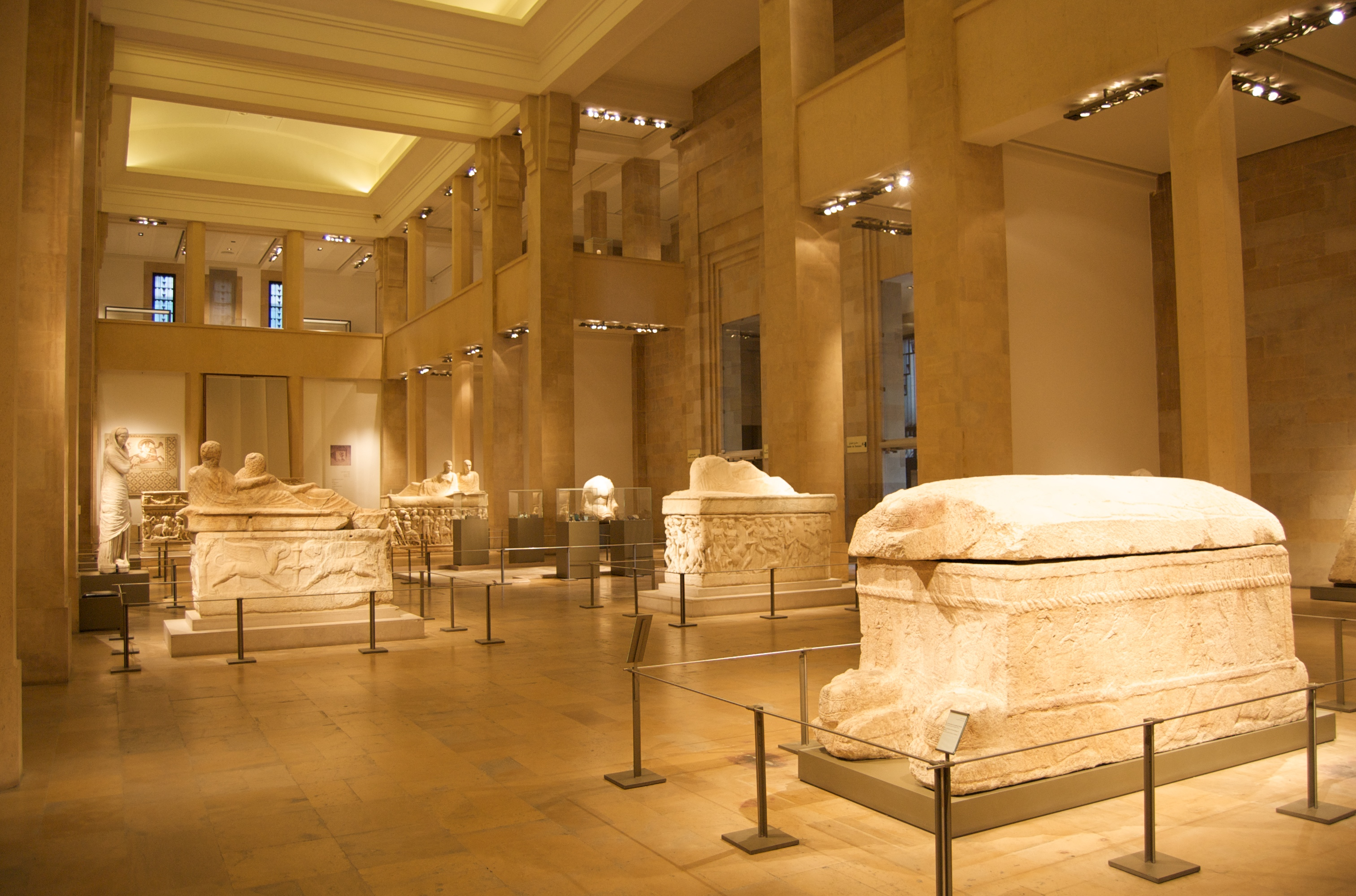
Side of the museum

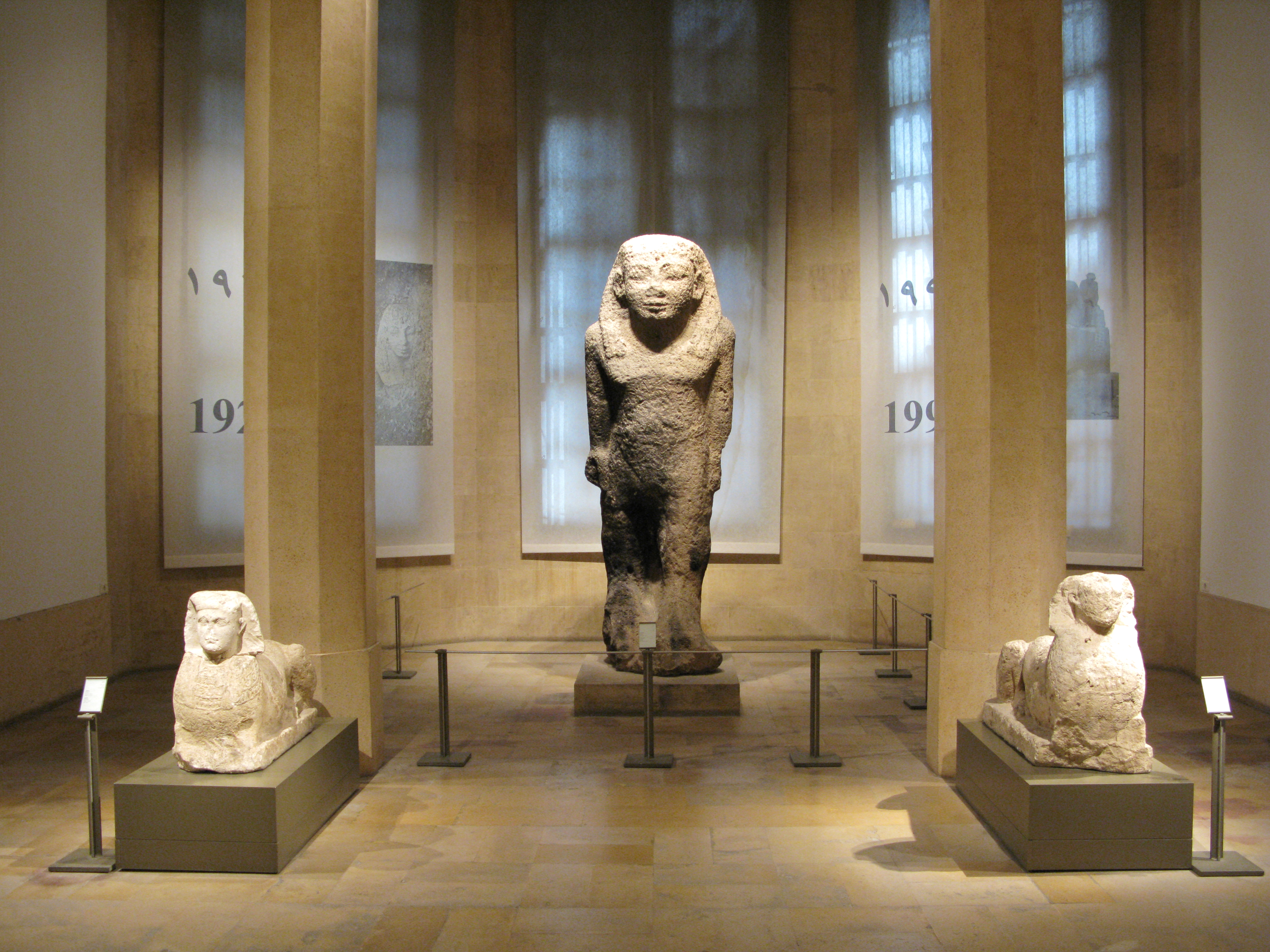
Statue

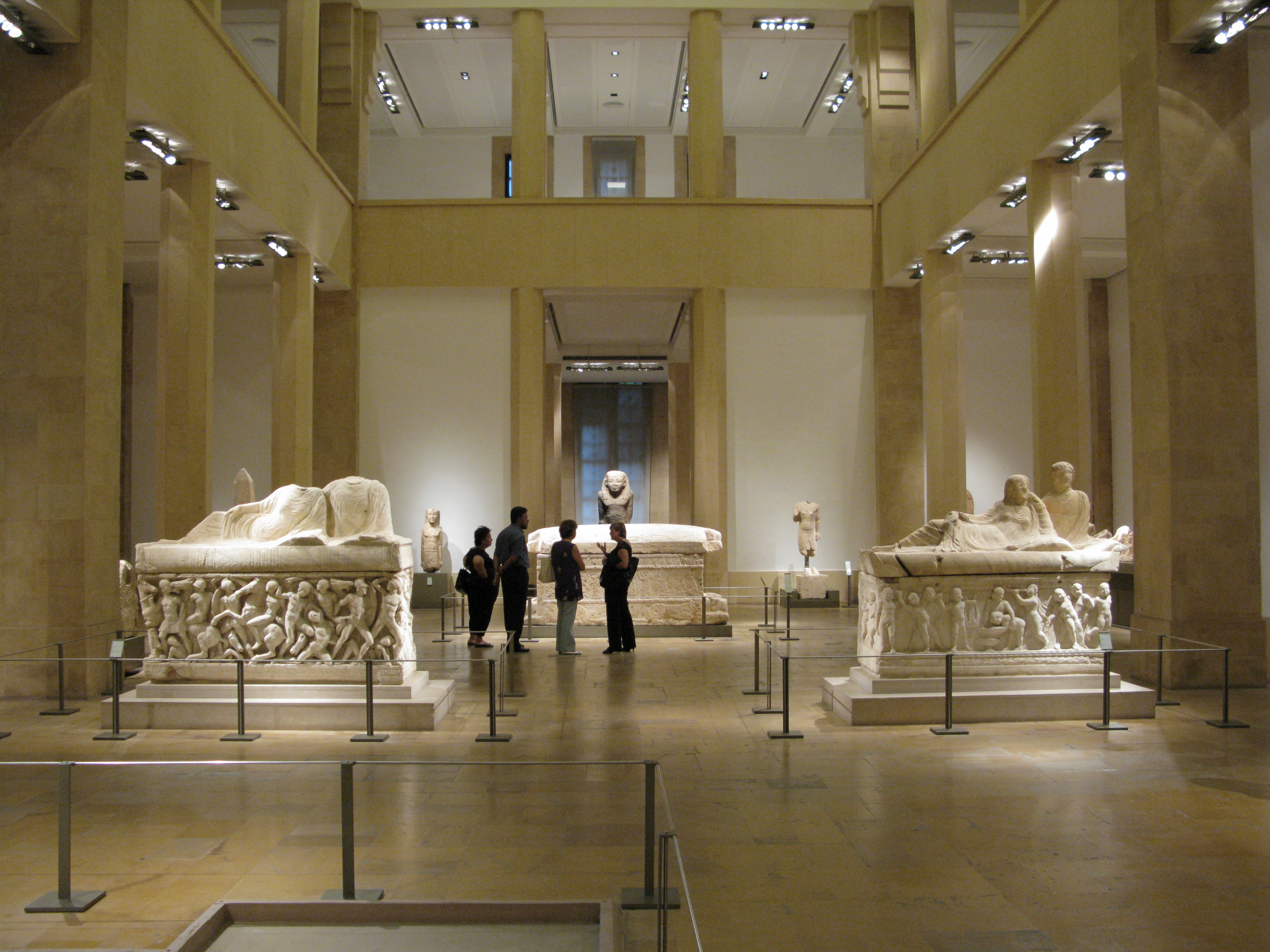
Main hall

== See also ==
- Alexander Sarcophagus – 4th-century BC Phoenician royal coffin
- Batnoam sarcophagus – Sarcophagus of a Phoenician royal
- Sarcophagus of Eshmunazar II – 6th-century BC Phoenician royal coffin
- Sursock bronze – Roman-era bronze statuette
