= Claude Doumet-Serhal =

Lebanese archaeologist

Claude Doumet-Serhal MBE FSA (b. 1958) is a Lebanese archaeologist specialising in the history and archaeology of Sidon. She is a Specialist Assistant at the British Museum and an Honorary Research Fellow at University College London.

== Biography ==
Doumet-Serhal studied at the Ecole du Louvre and has a PhD from Paris 1 Panthéon-Sorbonne University. After moving to London in 1993 she established the Lebanese British Friends of the National Museum. Doumet-Serhal launched a joint excavation between the British Museum and the Department of Antiquities of Lebanon in 1998 at Sidon which continued for 21 years. Excavations at Sidon have been her main research focus throughout her career and she has published extensively on this subject.

Doumet-Serhal was elected as a Fellow of the Society of Antiquaries of London on 10 October 2009. She was awarded an MBE in the 2010 New Year Honours list for services to archaeology.

Claude is a trustee of the Honor Frost Charitable Trust.

== Select publications ==
- Doumet-Serhal C, Gimatzidis S, Weninger B, von Rüden C, Kopetzky K. 2023. "An interdisciplinary approach to Iron Age Mediterranean chronology through combined archaeological and C14-radiometric evidence from Sidon, Lebanon". PLoS One 18(3): e0274979. doi:10.1371/journal.pone.0274979
- Mikulski RNR, Schutkowski H, Smith MJ, Doumet-Serhal C, Mitchell PD. 2021. "Weapon injuries in the crusader mass graves from a 13th century attack on the port city of Sidon (Lebanon)". PLoS ONE 16(8): e0256517. doi:10.1371/journal.pone.0256517
- Douhmet-Serhal, C. 2021. "Sidon from the end of the 13th to the 10th century BC: The temple", Archaeology and History in the Lebanon 54–55,
- Douhmet-Serhal, C. 2013. Sidon: 15 years of Excavations, London: Lebanese Friends of the National Museum.
- Bordreuil P and Doumet-Serhal C. 2013. "Un nouveau temple phénicien à Sidon", Comptes rendus des séances de l'Académie des Inscriptions et Belles-Lettres 157(1), 83-112.
- Resek A, Rabata A, Doumet-Serhal, C. 2004. Decade: A Decade of Archaeology and History in the Lebanon. London, Lebanese British Friends of the National Museum.
- Douhmet-Serhal, C. 1999. Stones and Creed: 100 Artefacts from Lebanon's Antiquity. London, Lebanese British Friends of the National Museum.
