= Araiji =

Araiji is an Arabic surname. Notable people with the surname include:

- Gebran Araiji (1951–2019), Lebanese politician
- Raymond Araiji (born 1965), Lebanese politician, lawyer, and government minister
