= Lady of Cádiz =

Phoenician sarcophagus from Cádiz

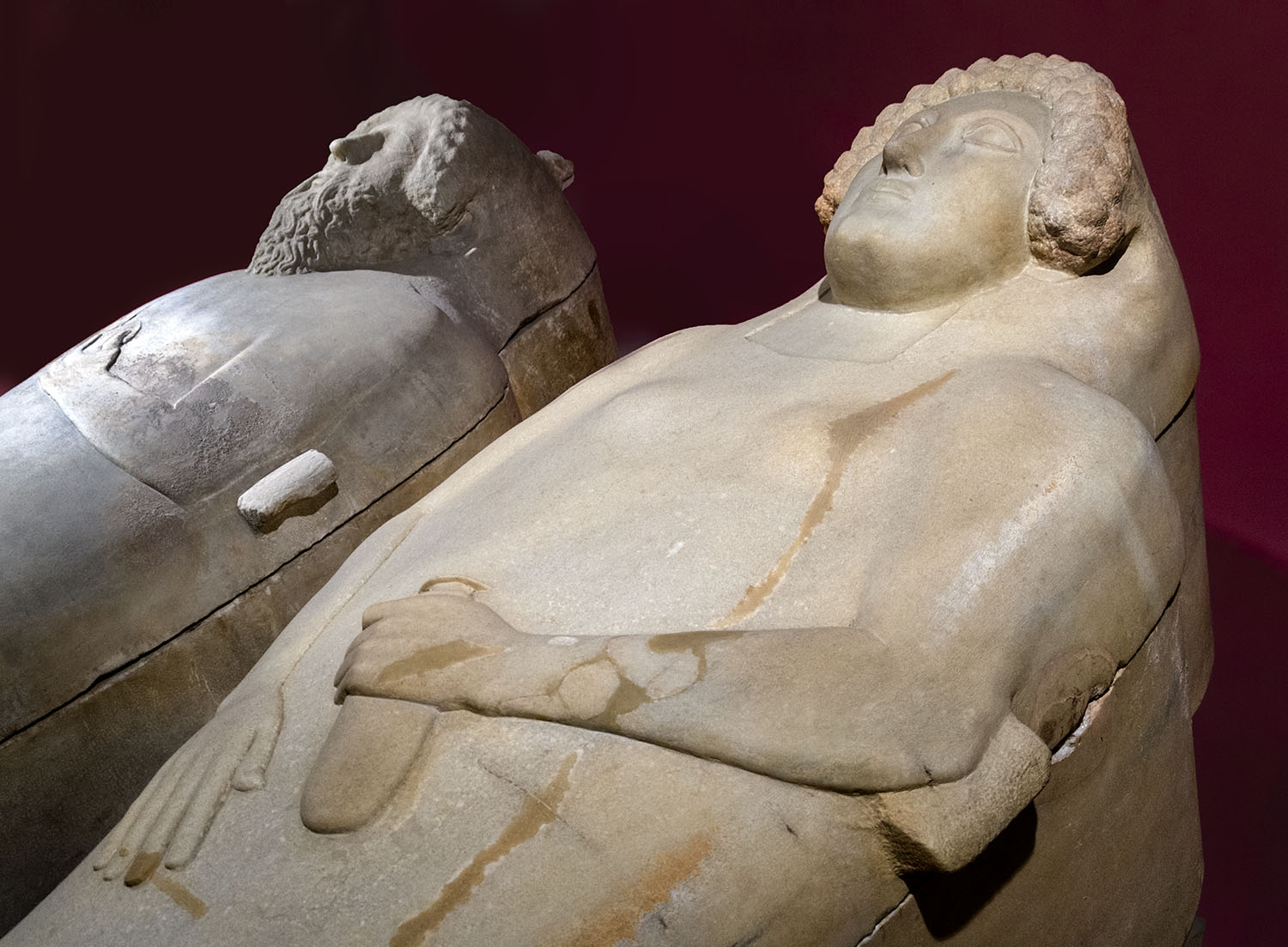
- The sarcophagus in its current location
- Created: 470 BC
- Discovered: 26 September 1980; Cádiz, Andalusia, Spain
- Present location: Museum of Cádiz

The Lady of Cádiz (Spanish: Dama de Cádiz) is the name given by modern archaeologists to a female anthropomorphic sarcophagus dating from 480 BC. It is from the Phoenician era and was found in Cádiz, then known as Gadir, which was the most important of the Phoenician colonies of the Iberian Peninsula. It is the second of two Phoenician sarcophagi found in Spain. Both are exhibited in the Museum of Cádiz. Recent investigations show that the person who rested in the sarcophagus was actually a robust man of about 45–50 years of age.

== Background ==
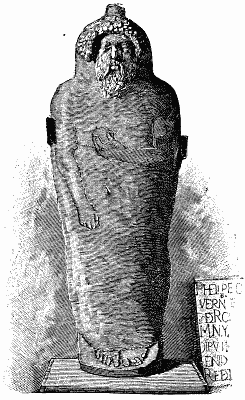
Anthropoid sarcophagus discovered at Cádiz in 1887.

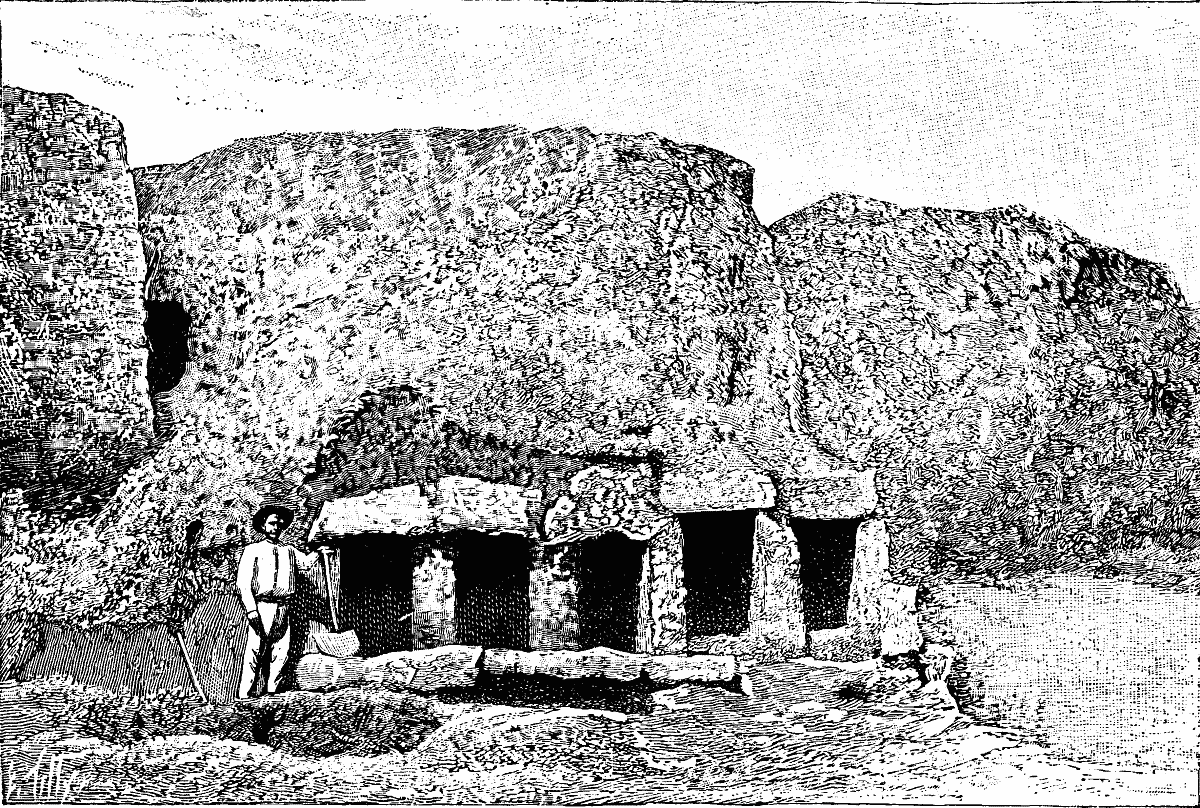
Tombs discovered at Cádiz in 1890. The labourer (left) holds a metre measure serving as a scale.

=== 1887 ===
In 1887, there were met with at the gates of Cádiz, at about five metres beneath the surface of the earth, three rude tombs of shelly limestone, in which were found some skeletons, a few small bronze instruments and some trinkets—the latter of undoubted oriental manufacture.

In one of these tombs was also inclosed a monolithic sarcophagus of white marble of the form called anthropoid and measuring 2.15 metres in length by 0.67 in width. This sarcophagus was soon preserved in the local museum, whose director was one Father Vera. According to the account published in the Scientific American four years after the discovery, although the sarcophagus is of essentially oriental manufacture, it has undoubtedly undergone the Hellenistic influence, which implies an epoch posterior to that of Pericles, who died in 429 BC. The personage represented, a man of mature age with noble lineaments and aquiline nose, has thick hair corned up on the forehead in the form of a crown, and a beard plaited in the Asiatic fashion. As for the head, which is almost entirely executed in round relief, that denotes in an undoubted manner the Hellenistic influence, united, however, with the immutable and somewhat hierarchical traditions of Phoenician art. The arms are naked as far as to the elbow, and the feet, summarily indicated, emerge from a long sheath-form robe. As for the arms and hands, they project slightly and are rather outlined than sculptured. The left hand grasps a fruit, the emblem of fecundity, while the right held a painted crown, the traces of which have now entirely disappeared.

The marble anthropoid was protected by a tomb absolutely like the rude tombs contiguous to it. According to the Scientific American, "It suffices to look at this sarcophagus to recognise the exclusively Phoenician character of it, and the complete analogy with the monuments of the same species met with in Phoenicia, in Cyprus, in Sicily, in Malta, in Sardinia, and everywhere where were established those of Tyre and Sidon, but never until now in Spain."

These first discoveries, which were purely accidental, were brought about by the work on the foundations of the Maritime Arsenal.

=== 1890–1891 ===
Successive discoveries were made from 3 January 1890 at nearly the same place, and at a depth of from three to six metres beneath the surface, of numerous inculi absolutely identical as to material and structure with those discovered in 1887. The unearthing of the loculi on 14 April revealed the depth of each tomb was about two meters, and that upon the lower part of three of the parallelopipeds there were pavements of crucial appearance. Nothing denoted externally the existence of these sarcophagi hidden from investigation according to a usage that is established especially by the imprecations graven upon the basaltic casket now preserved in the Museum of the Louvre, and which contained the ashes of Eshmanazar, King of Sidon.

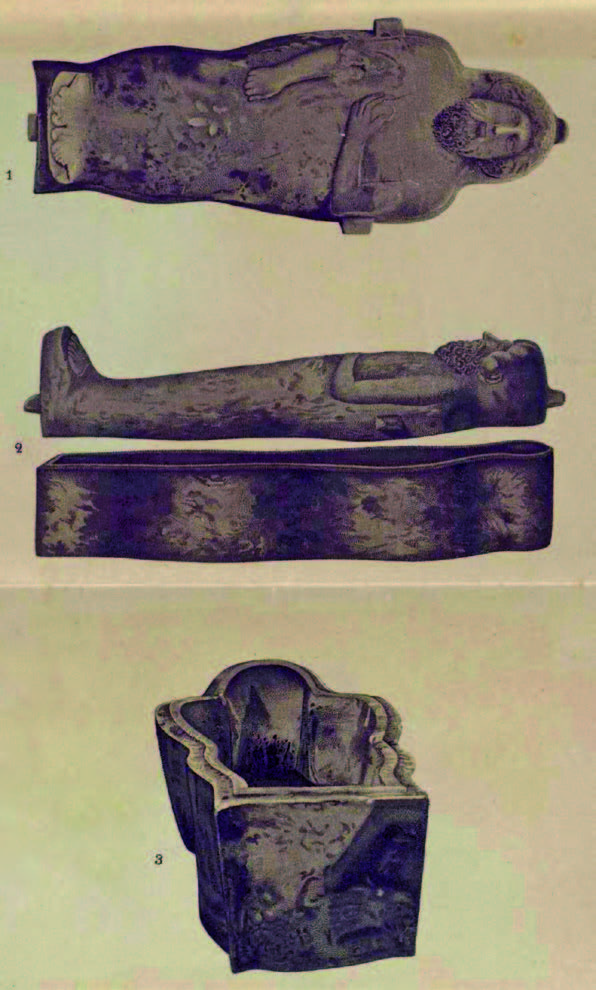
Three views of the male sarcophagus and coffin in 1891.

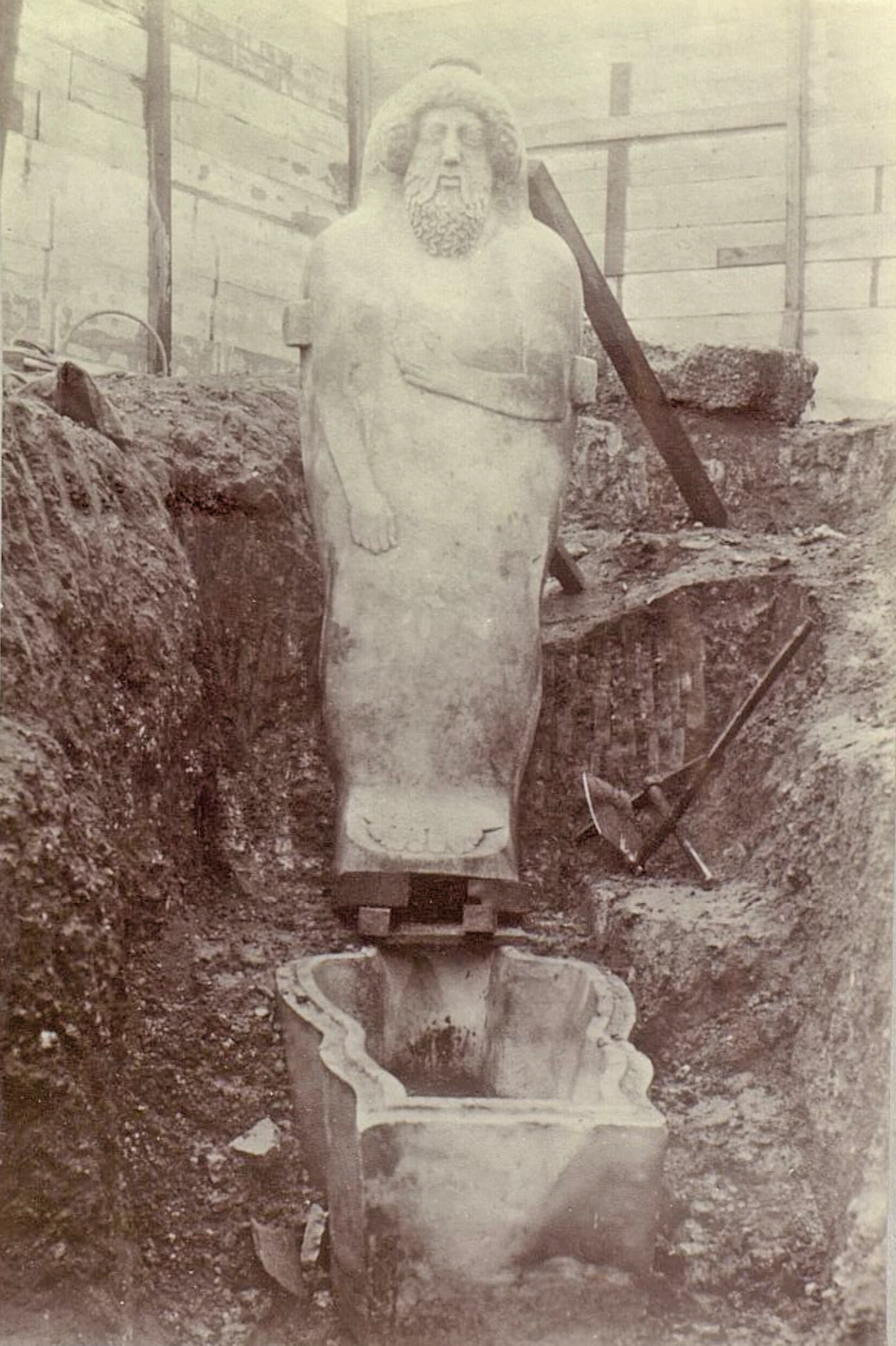
The male sarcophagus, photographed on the day of its official opening, 1 June 1887.

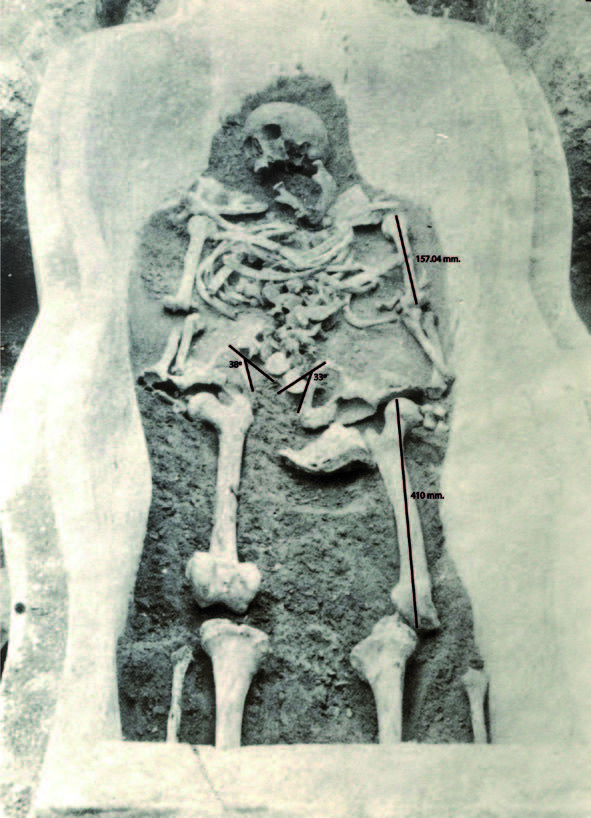
Human remains found in the male sarcophagus, 1 June 1887.

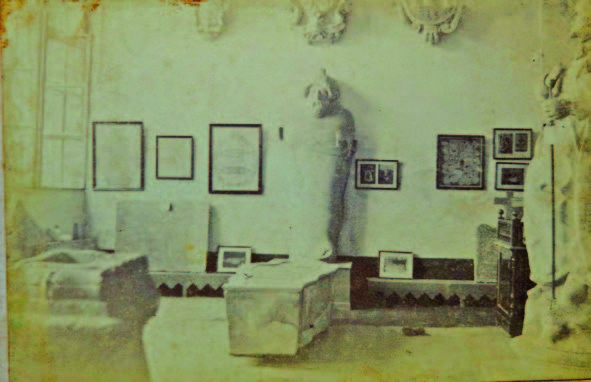
Vaulted room of the Museum of Cádiz, where the male sarcophagus was exhibited, 1889.

== Lady of Cádiz ==
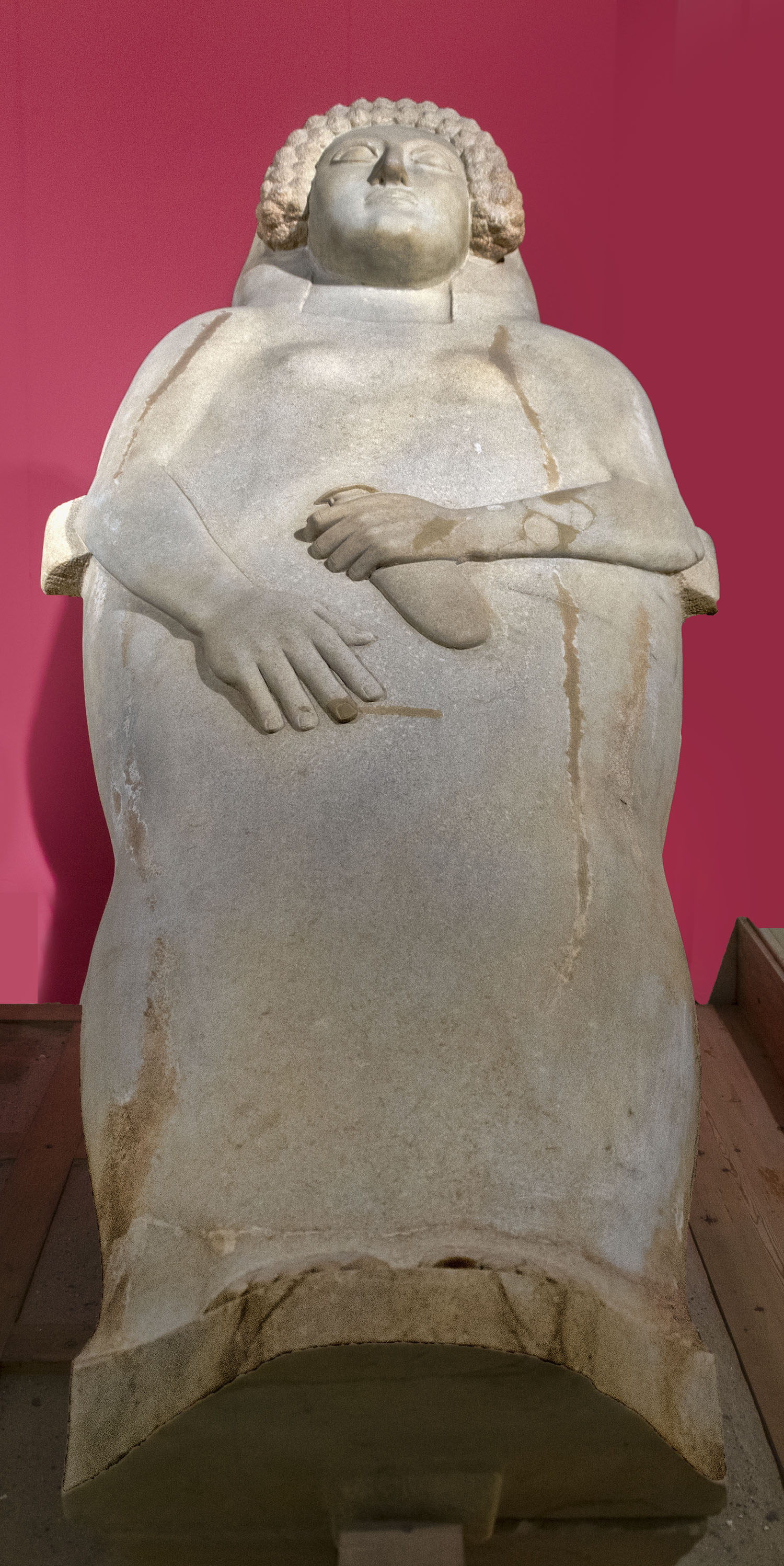
The female sarcophagus, called The Lady of Cádiz, in the Museum of Cádiz in 2015.

=== Discovery ===
Pelayo Quintero Atauri, an archaeologist from Uclés, was appointed director of the Provincial Museum of Fine Arts of Cádiz (now the Museum of Cádiz) and his theory was that if a male sarcophagus had been found, there must have been a female one. He dedicated a good part of his life to searching for it, although he died without being able to find it. The major surprise came when, a century later, the Lady of Cádiz was found just under a palm tree in the old house of Quintero Atauri.

Quintero Atauri tuvo, en fin, un sueño, pero nunca supo que dormía sobre ese sueño.. Jamás se nos ocurre mirar la tierra que pisamos cada día de nuestra existencia, aunque la mayoría de las veces esa tierra pisoteada es el único tesoro accesible: un lugar insignificante en el universo.

Quintero Atauri had, in short, a dream, but he never knew that he was sleeping on that dream … It never occurs to us to look at the land we tread every day of our existence, although most of the time that trampled land is the only accessible treasure: an insignificant place in the universe.

On 26 September 1980, during excavation works aimed at laying the foundations for a new construction on Ruiz de Alda street in Cádiz, the oldest and most valuable Phoenician sarcophagus of those now preserved in the Museum of Cádiz was found. The incident occurred when the excavator collided with the marble, the operator extracting one of the bones and automatically informing the authorities upon noticing the finding. Ramón Corzo Sánchez, the then director of the Museum of Cádiz, took charge of the sarcophagus, filling it with sand to preserve the remains, to later transfer it to the museum. The archaeologist and later director of the museum, Antonio Álvarez, was in charge of restoring it for its exhibition.

=== Description ===
The Lady of Cádiz represents a young woman of serene beauty exceptionally carved on marble. Both the male and female sarcophagus were made in the Phoenician city of Sidon, inspired by Egyptian burial forms and materially executed by Greek artists; they provide important materials of knowledge of the vital customs of the Phoenician people, both in their physical centre of origin and throughout their entire Mediterranean expansion. The fact that carvings of this magnitude were made thousands of kilometres from the place where they were found speaks for itself both of the uses maintained by the Phoenician people and of the same importance acquired by the city of Cádiz as the nerve centre of their presence in the westernmost point of the continent.

This figure conserves nuanced remains of the colours with which the carvers from the other end of the Mediterranean animated the whiteness of the marble used as the material to be sculpted. Much larger than life size, as is common in this kind of funerary carvings, the sculpture that has now come to be called the Phoenician Lady of Cádiz can be considered with absolute certainty as one of the oldest of its kind. Its realisation is placed around the year 470 BC, an early date in relation to the other similar works that some museums of the world conserve. The trousseau is quite discreet, since the Phoenician-Gaditan society did not show their social status through jewellery.

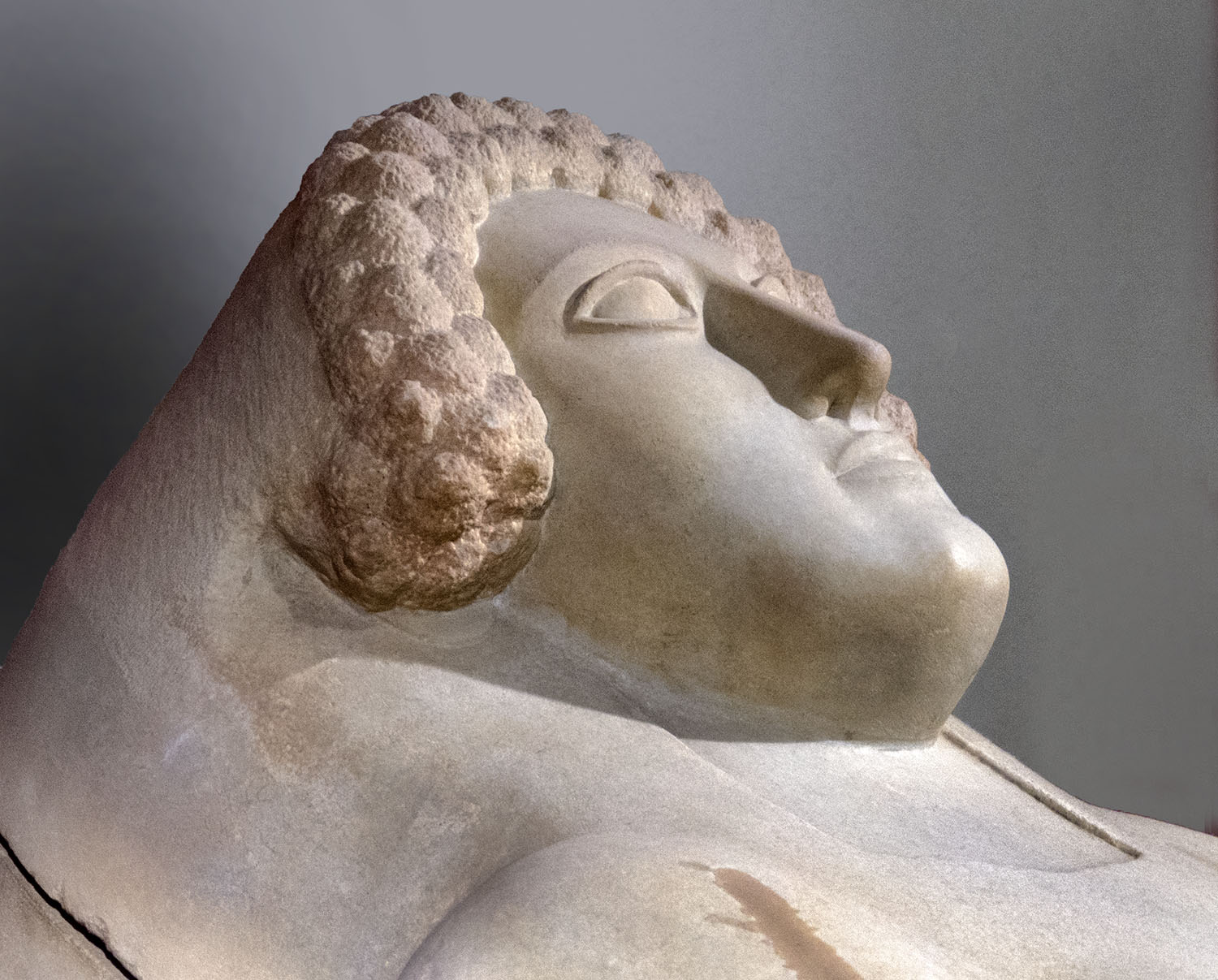
Detail of the head of the female sarcophagus in 2015.

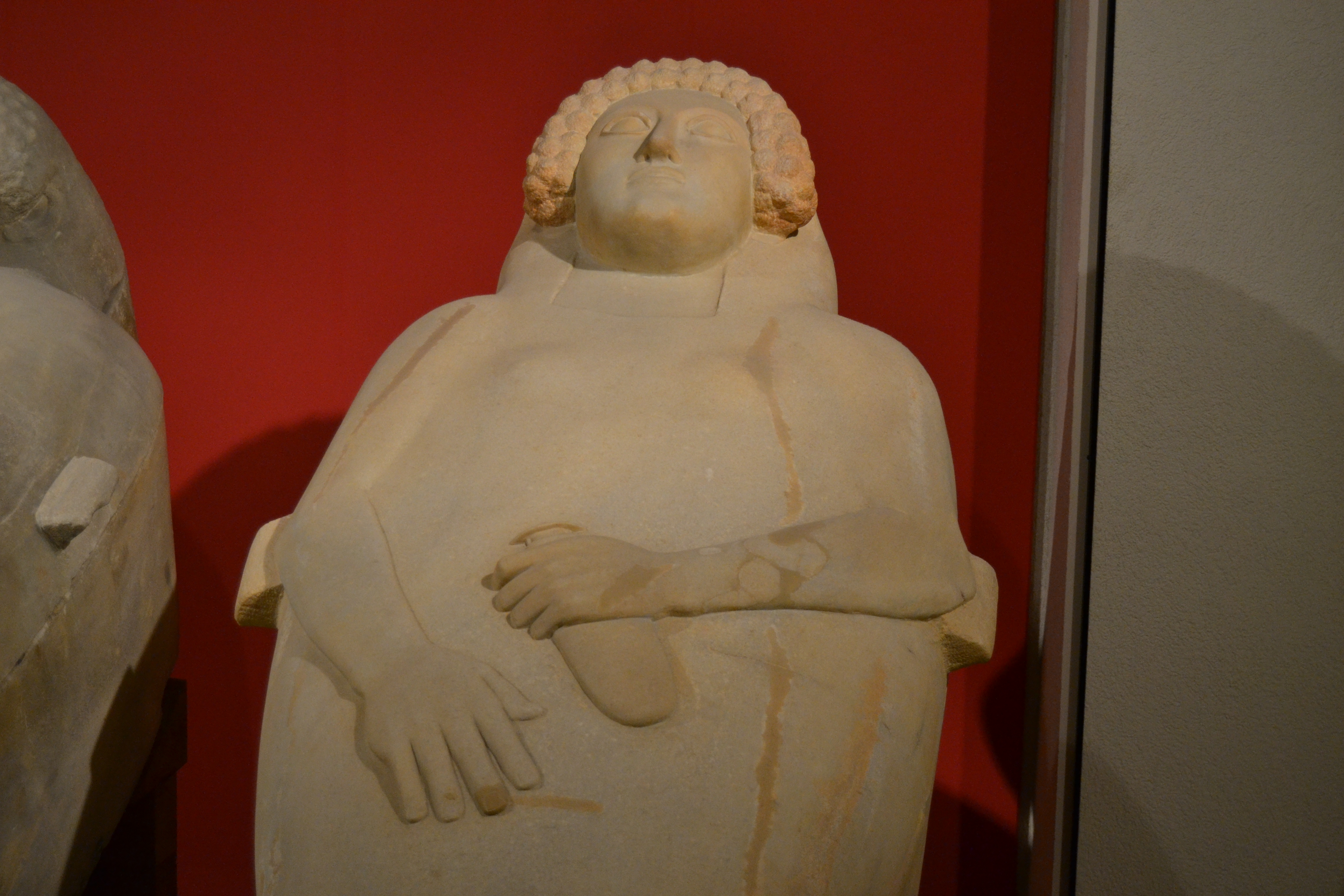
Detail of the head and torso of the female sarcophagus.

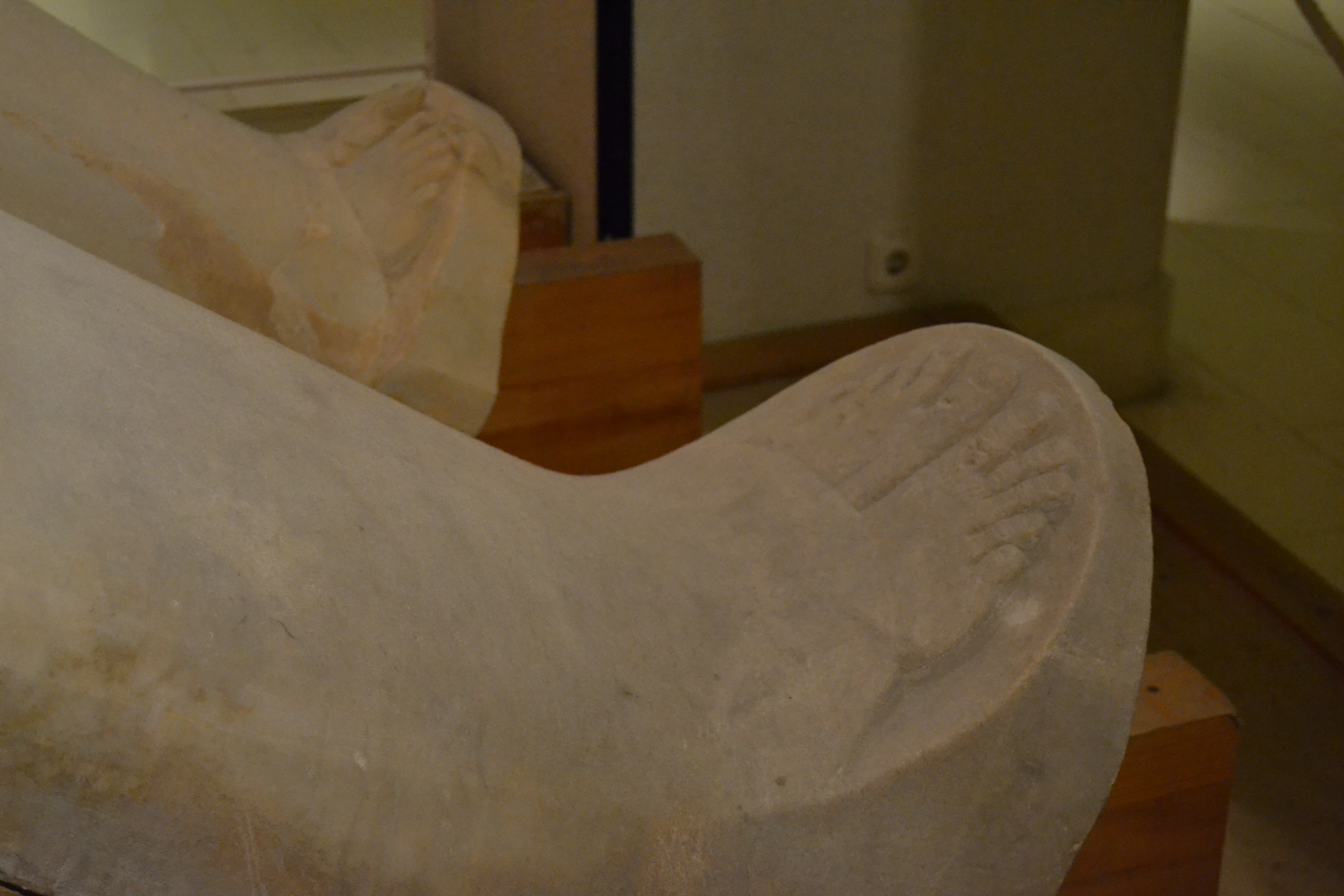
Detail of the feet of the female sarcophagus.

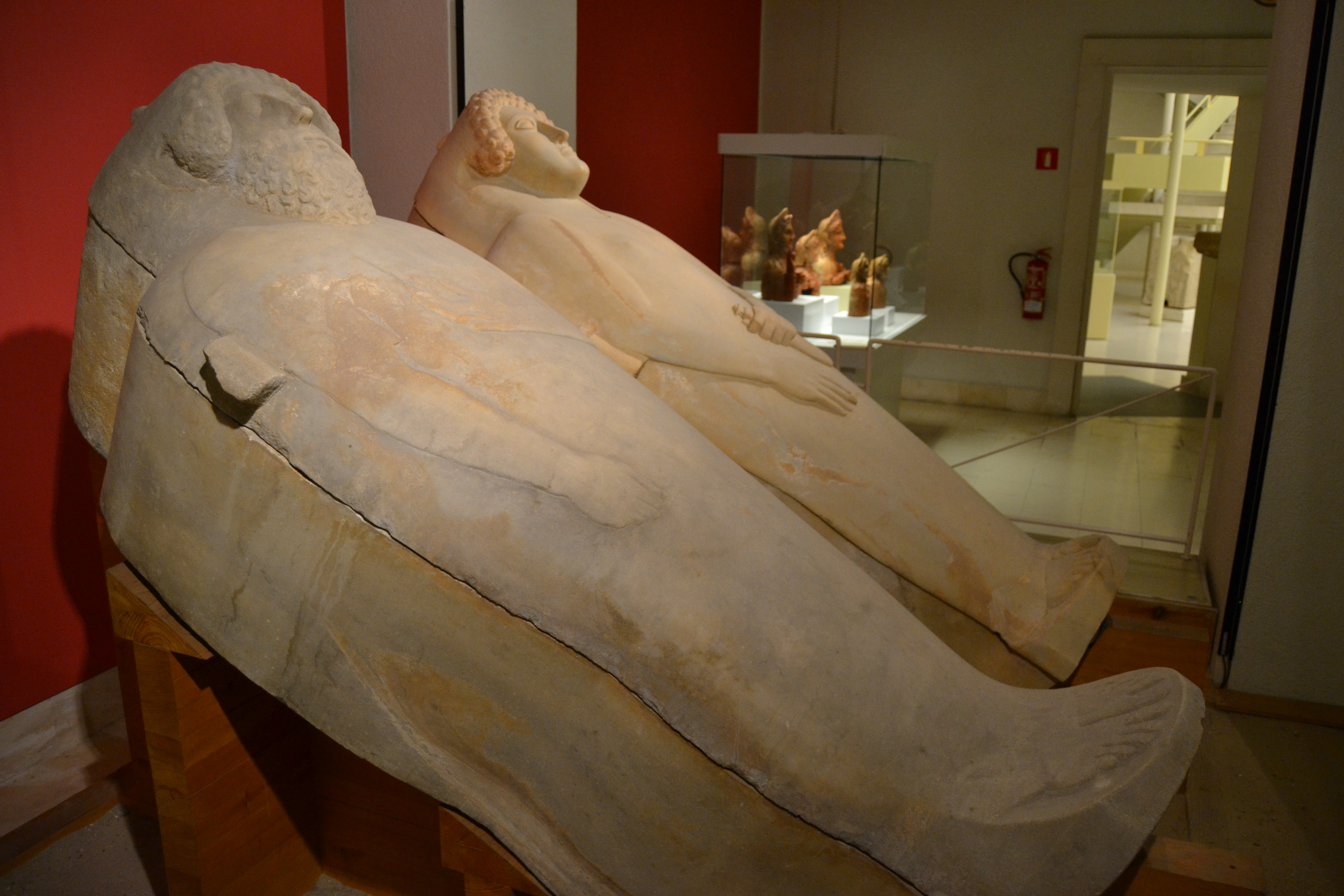
Detail of the male sarcophagus.

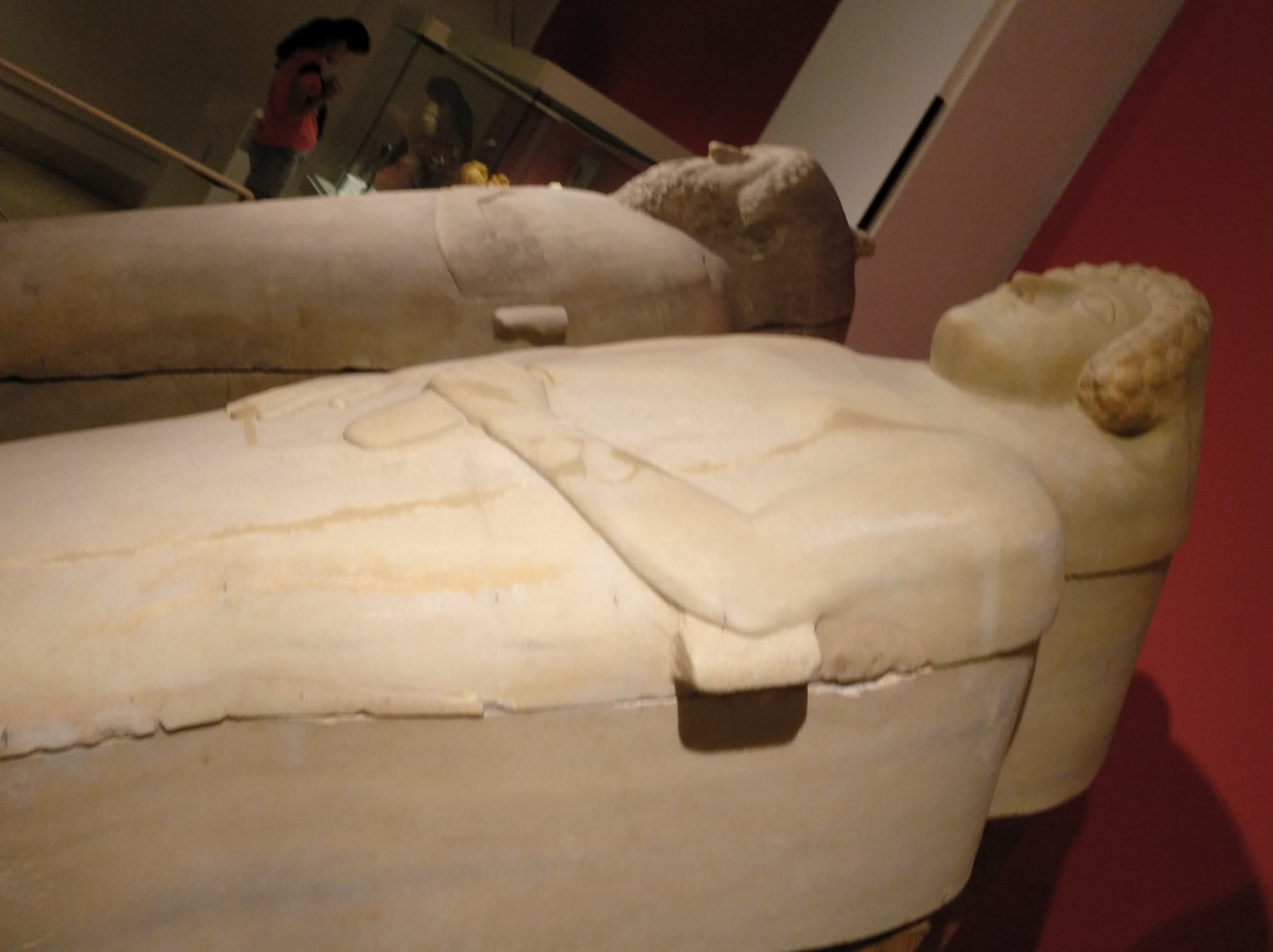
Detail of the female sarcophagus.

== See also ==
- Similar sarcophagi:
  - Ford Collection sarcophagi
  - Royal necropolis of Ayaa
- History of Spain
- List of the Pre-Roman peoples of the Iberian Peninsula
