= Ford Collection sarcophagi =

Group of Phoenician marble sarcophagi found in Lebanon

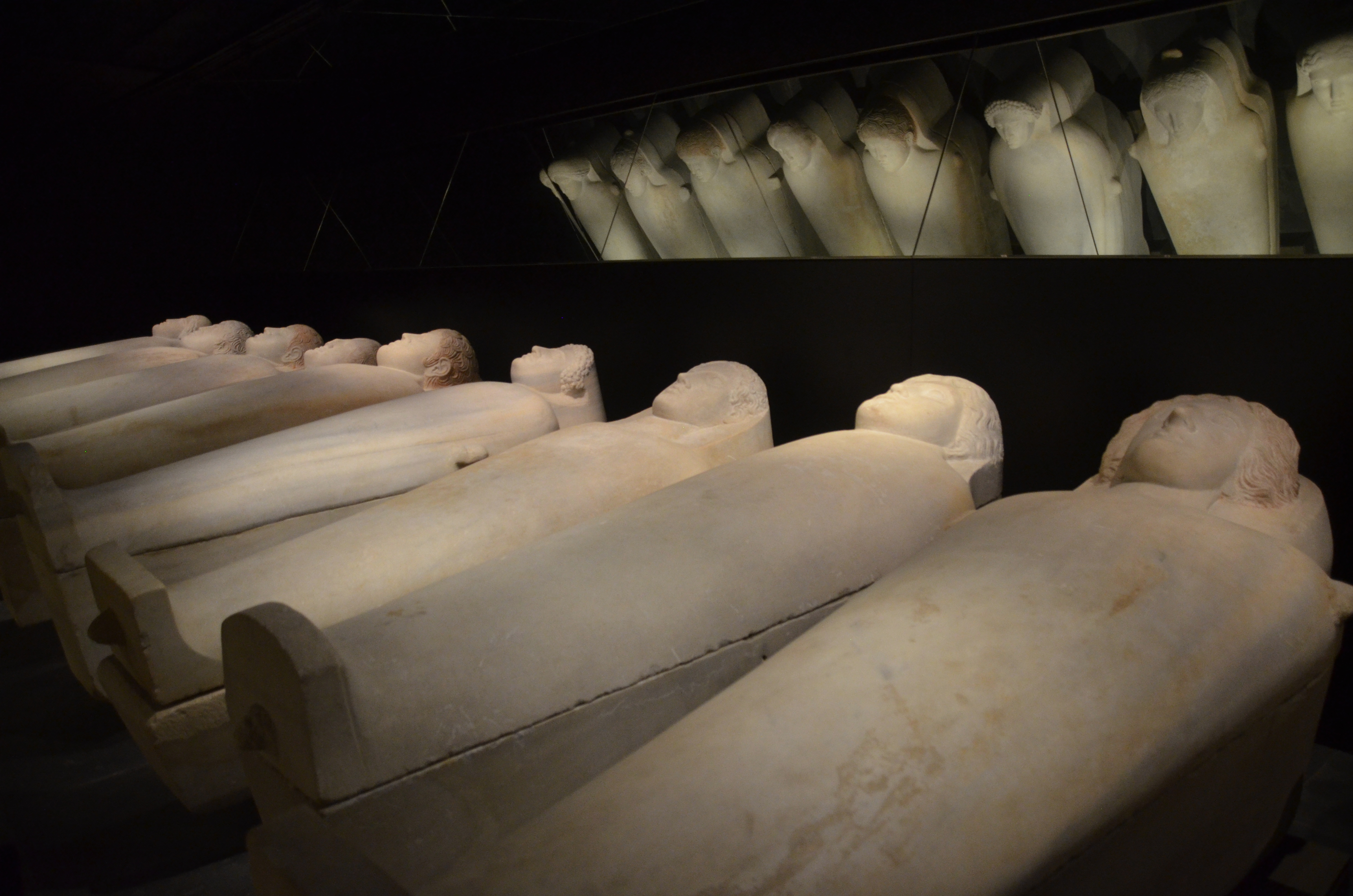
The sarcophagi in the National Museum of Beirut

The Ford Collection sarcophagi are a collection of ancient anthropoid Phoenician sarcophagi, considered a highlight of the National Museum of Beirut. They are made from white marble.

They were discovered in 1901 in shaft tombs at Ain al-Hilweh, southeast of Sidon, during the excavations of the American School in Jerusalem. The finds were first published in full in 1919 by Charles Cutler Torrey.

The land was owned by the American Presbyterian Mission School, who took possession of the sarcophagi and donated it to the National Museum of Beirut in 1930. The collection was then named the Ford Collection in honor of George Alfred Ford, the previous director of the Mission School who had died two years before in 1928.

It is still today the largest collection of this type of sarcophagi in the world.

== See also ==
- Lady of Cádiz

== Bibliography ==
- Editio princeps: Charles Cutler Torrey. “A Phoenician Necropolis at Sidon” The Annual of the American Schools of Oriental Research in Jerusalem, vol. 1, 1919, pp. 1–27.
