= George Alfred Ford =

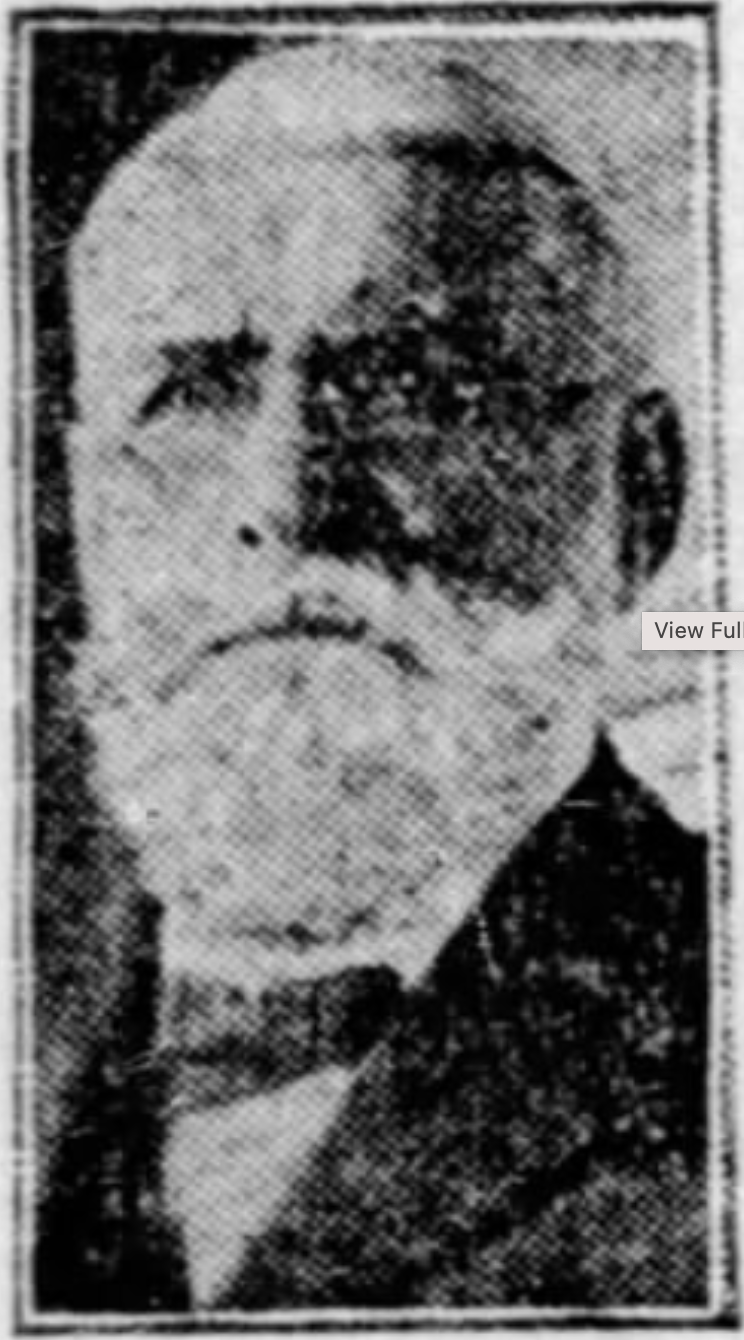
George Alfred Ford

George Alfred Ford (1851–1928) was an American Presbyterian missionary.

He was born in 1851 in Aleppo. His father had been a missionary in Syria, and his grandfather, Colonel Mahlon Ford, a member of Washington's staff in the American Revolution.

Ford was educated at Williams College and the Union Presbyterian Seminary, returning to Syria in 1880. After his education he returned to Syria to work at the Boy's Training School, later the Gerard Institute (presently known as the National Evangelical Institute for Girls and Boys). He died in 1928 in Sidon, Lebanon.

== See also ==
- Ford Collection sarcophagi – Group of Phoenician marble sarcophagi found in Lebanon

== Sources ==
- Missionary digs up coffins Dr. George A Ford, Chicago Tribune, 09 Sep 1923, p.18
- “3 Americans in Late Nineteenth-Century Syria.” International Migration Review 29, no. 2_suppl (January 1995): 50–78. https://doi.org/10.1177/019791839502902s06.
