= Lebanese British Friends of the National Museum =

The Lebanese British Friends of the National Museum or LBFNM is a private, cultural heritage organization that was founded in London in 1993 with the aim of supporting the National Museum of Beirut.

The organization has assisted with the renovation of the Museum laboratory and improving connections with the British Museum. The LBFNM has also assisted with their exhibitions, the museum catalog and published various books on various historical and archaeological topics. It also publishes a journal entitled Archaeology and History in Lebanon (ISSN 1475-5564). The organization also organizes an annual symposia, hosting a reception after the symposium of 2008 at the Bristol Hotel in Beirut with guests including Tammam Salam, Inas Saleh and Semaan Bassil.
