= Raymond Araiji =

Lebanese politician

Raymond "Rony" Araiji (in Arabic ريمون "روني" عريجي) (born in Zgharta, Lebanon on 31 July 1965) is a Lebanese politician, lawyer and government minister.

== Education and career ==
He received a bachelor's degree in law from the Saint Joseph University (USJ), Beirut in 1988 and a post graduate studies diploma in private law in 1989 from the same university.

In 1990, he joined the Beirut Bar Association as a lawyer, and then continued to practice his legal profession at his private office.

He is a founding member of the Marada Movement and previously a consultant to Suleiman Tony Frangieh. He was foreign relations coordinator for the Marada Movement political bureau.

On 15 February 2014, he was named as the minister of culture in the cabinet of Lebanese Prime Minister Tammam Salam. His tenure ended in 2016.

== Private life ==
He is married to Wadad Abdullah and has two daughters.
