= James Sie =

American actor

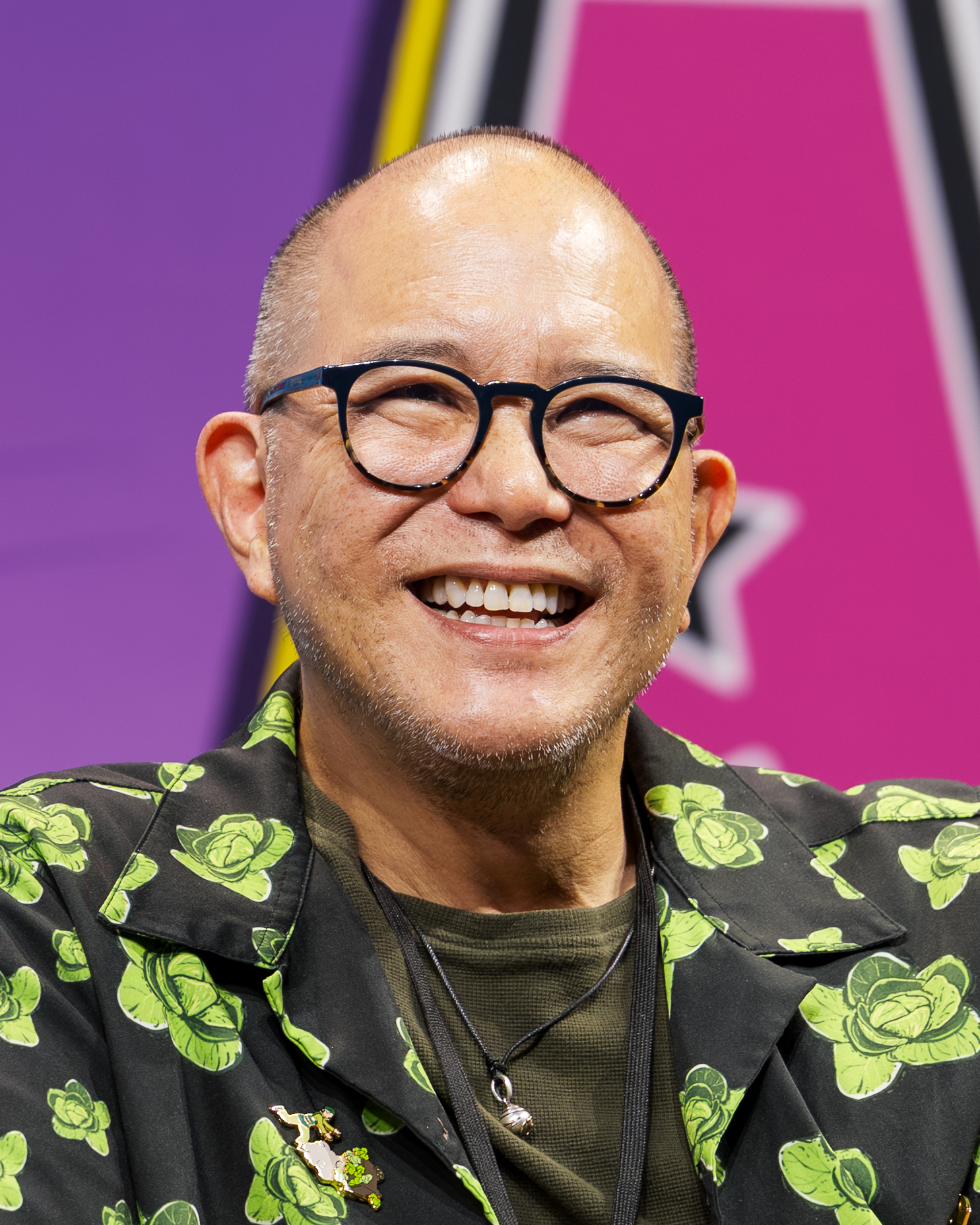
- Sie at Animate! Columbus in 2026
- Born: December 18, 1962 (age 63); Summit, New Jersey, U.S.
- Occupations: Actor; author
- Years active: 1996–present
- Spouse: Douglas Wood (m. 2008)
- Children: 1

James Sie (born December 18, 1962) is an American actor and author. He is best known as a voice double for Jackie Chan, having voiced an animated Chan and several other characters in Jackie Chan Adventures. He is also known for his recurring role as the Cabbage Merchant in Avatar: the Last Airbender, as well as Master Monkey in Kung Fu Panda: Legends of Awesomeness (taking over for Jackie Chan), and Eddy Raja in the Uncharted series. His debut novel, Still Life Las Vegas, was published in August 2015.

== Career ==
He is known as a "Jackie Chan impersonator" as his voice bears a strong resemblance to the titular actor especially in the Kids' WB animated television series Jackie Chan Adventures. He also voices Chow and Shendu in the same series. He has performed several voices for Avatar: The Last Airbender, perhaps one of the most notable being the recurring Cabbage Merchant, and is also the voice of Master Monkey in Nickelodeon's Kung Fu Panda: Legends of Awesomeness, replacing Jackie Chan from the films (Sie also provided the voice of Monkey in video games). Other popular roles include Chinese American footballer Kwan in Danny Phantom (replacing Dat Phan), Chen Lin in W.I.T.C.H., Fin Fang Foom and Radioactive Man in Marvel: Ultimate Alliance, Eddy Raja in Uncharted: Drake's Fortune, and guest-voiced as an Asian scientist named Jimmy in Regular Show and also voices Lord Taran Zhu in World of Warcraft: Mists of Pandaria. He had a brief role as a Buddhist Lama in the 2021 The Simpsons episode "Wad Goals".

He starred on-camera, opposite Suzy Nakamura in Strawberry Fields. He also had roles in Chain Reaction. Sie wrote and performed the autobiographical one-person stage show, Talking With My Hands in 1999, about growing up in a Chinese/Italian household. His play, Island of the Blue Dolphins at the Lifeline Theatre in Chicago, Illinois was awarded the 1995 Joseph Jefferson Award Citation for New Work. James has also garnered two Jeff Citation nominations for his Lifeline adaptations of Dracula and A Wrinkle in Time, which was produced at Lincoln Center Institute in New York. He has received an After Dark Award for The Road to Graceland. His other adaptations include Randy Shilts' Talking AIDS to Death and Daniel Pinkwater's The Snarkout Boys and the Avocado of Death, which was also broadcast on WFMT's "Chicago Theatres on the Air".

== Personal life ==
Sie is gay and has been married to singer-songwriter Douglas Wood since 2008. They have one child, Benjamin, whom they adopted from Vietnam.

== Filmography ==
=== Film ===
Year	Title	Role	Notes
1996	Chain Reaction	Ken Lim	
1997	Strawberry Fields	Luke	
1998	U.S. Marshals	Vincent Ling	
1999	Bats	Sergeant James	
2001	Ghost World		
2002	Hero	Broken Sword	Voice, English dub
2006	Ice Age: The Meltdown	Elk Dad	Voice
2006	The Invincible Iron Man	Wong-Chu	Voice, direct-to-video
2007	Chill Out, Scooby-Doo!	Pemba	Voice
2008	Secrets of the Furious Five	Viper's Father	Voice
2009	Curious George: A Very Monkey Christmas	Grocer's Son	Voice
2012	Back to the Sea	Cook Liu	Voice
2014	When Marnie Was There	Kazuhiko	Voice, English dub
2016	Kung Fu Panda: Secrets of the Scroll	Master Monkey, Viper's Father	Voice
2019	How to Train Your Dragon: The Hidden World	Chaghatai Khan	Voice
2019	White Snake	Dark General	Voice, English dub
2023	The Monkey King	Elder Monkey	Voice
2024	Kung Fu Panda 4	Bull Officer #2, Master Villain #1, Ram Worker	Voices

=== Television ===
Year	Title	Role	Notes
2000	Even Stevens	Lana Dagchen	Episode: "Playing God"
2000–2005	Jackie Chan Adventures	Jackie Chan, Shendu, Chow	Main voice role (95 episodes)
2001	Time Squad	Confucius	Voice, 2 episodes
2003	Without a Trace	Walter	Episode: "The Friendly Skies"
2003–2006	Danny Phantom	Kwan, Camper, Alarm Voice	Voice, 12 episodes
2004	Game Over	Sam Chang	Voice, 4 episodes
2004	Justice League Unlimited	General Kwan, Wind Dragon	Voice, 2 episodes
2005	The Adventures of Jimmy Neutron, Boy Genius	Yoo Yee, Elderly Monk, Ninja	Voice, episode: "Crouching Jimmy, Hidden Sheen"
2005	What's New, Scooby-Doo?	Louie Hong Fa	Voice, episode: "Block-Long Hong Kong Terror"
2005–2008	Avatar: The Last Airbender	Cabbage Merchant, Oyaji	Voice, 4 episodes
2005–2009	Numbers	FBI Agent, Lab Tech, FBI Tech, Technician	4 episodes
2006	W.I.T.C.H.	Chen Lin	Voice, episode: "X is for Xanadu"
2006	Handy Manny	Mr. Chu	Voice, 3 episodes
2006	The Life and Times of Juniper Lee	Kai Yee	Voice, episode: "Out of the Past"
2006	Shorty McShorts' Shorts	Cory	Voice, episode: "Boyz on da Run"
2006–2008	The Replacements	Master Pho	Voice, 2 episodes
2007	Billy & Mandy: Wrath of the Spider Queen	Plain Cow	Voice, television film
2007	Random! Cartoons	Narrator, Monkey Butt	Voice, episode: "Dugly Uckling's Treasure Quest"
2008	The Secret Saturdays	Shoji Fuzen	Voice, 2 episodes
2008	The Starter Wife	Doug	3 episodes
2009	Back at the Barnyard	Kobe Cow	Voice, episode: "Sun Cow"
2009	Wolverine and the X-Men	Yakuza Leader, Yakuza Ninja, Sensei Ogun	Voice, episode: "Code of Conduct"
2009	Batman: The Brave and the Bold	Atom, Dyna-Mite	Voice, 4 episodes
2010	Regular Show	Jimmy	Voice, episode: "Grilled Cheese Deluxe"
2010	Ni Hao, Kai-Lan	Fox King	Voice, episode: "Princess Kai-Lan"
2011	Fish Hooks	Spiky Ninja	Voice, episode: "Milo Gets a Ninja"
2011	The Chicago Code	Daniel	Voice, episode: "O'Leary's Cow"
2011–2016	Kung Fu Panda: Legends of Awesomeness	Master Monkey, various voices	Main voice role (64 episodes)
2012	Teenage Mutant Ninja Turtles	Tsoi	Voice, 2 episodes
2012	Kickin' It	Yin Chen	Episode: "The Chosen One"
2012–2013	The Legend of Korra	Lau Gan-Lan, Abbot Shung	Voice, 2 episodes
2013–2016	Sofia the First	Emperor Quon, Lawrence	Voice, 3 episodes
2015–2017	Miles from Tomorrowland	Gong Gong	Voice, 4 episodes
2018	Fancy Nancy	Mr. Chen	Voice, episode: "Shoe La La!"
2018–2019	Kung Fu Panda: The Paws of Destiny	Bunnidharma, White Tiger	Voice, 16 episodes
2019	The Lion Guard	Smun, Sahasi	Voice, 3 episodes
2019	The Loud House	Senior Hat Customer, Waiter	Voice, episode: "A Grave Mistake"
2020–present	Stillwater	Stillwater, Ren	Main voice role (40 episodes)
2021	Carmen Sandiego	Huang Li	Voice, episode: "The Beijing Bullion Caper"
2022–2023	Kung Fu Panda: The Dragon Knight	Lao	Voice, 2 episodes
2022–2023	Star Trek: Lower Decks	Kaltorus, Doctor Chaotica, G'reck	Voice, 2 episodes
2023	Monkie Kid	Shifu Subodhi	Voice, 4 episodes
2024–2026	Avatar: The Last Airbender	Cabbage Merchant	3 episodes
2025	Teen Titans Go!	Dr. Moon	Voice, episode: "Moonlighting"

=== Video games ===
Year	Title	Role	Notes
2002	Bruce Lee: Quest of the Dragon	Additional voices	
2004	Shellshock: Nam '67	Diem	
2004	Shark Tale	Tenant Fish	
2004	Jackie Chan Adventures	Jackie Chan	
2005	X-Men Legends II: Rise of Apocalypse	Sunfire	
2006	Guild Wars Factions	Suun	
2006	Marvel: Ultimate Alliance	Fin Fang Foom, Mandarin, Radioactive Man, Ancient One	
2006	Lost Planet: Extreme Condition	Dennis Isenberg	
2007	Spider-Man 3	Dragon Tail Thug	
2007	The Golden Compass	Samoyeds, Trollesunds	
2007	Uncharted: Drake's Fortune	Eddy Raja	
2007	Syphon Filter: Logan's Shadow	Shen Rei	
2008	Metal Gear Solid 4: Guns of the Patriots	Jonathan	
2008	Kung Fu Panda	Master Monkey	
2008	Kung Fu Panda: Legendary Warriors	Rabbit, Rat Goon	
2009	Indiana Jones and the Staff of Kings	Blind Duck	
2009	Wet	Ming Cheung	
2009	Uncharted 2: Among Thieves	Eddy Raja	
2010	Lost Planet 2	Additional voices	
2010	Blur	Jun	
2010	Mafia II	Zhe Yun Wong	
2011	Kung Fu Panda 2	Master Monkey	
2011	Uncharted 3: Drake's Deception	Eddy Raja	
2012	Hitman: Absolution	King of Chinatown, Larry Clay, Chicago Cop, Vixen Club Bouncer, Blackwater Guard	
2012	World of Warcraft: Mists of Pandaria	Taran Zhu	
2013	Marvel Heroes	Jimmy Woo	
2015	Fallout 4	Jun Long, Doctor Sun	
2016	Hitman	Kong Tuo-Kwang	
2016	Uncharted 4: A Thief's End	Eddy Raja	
2020	Final Fantasy VII Remake	Professor Hojo	
2020	Ghost of Tsushima	Trapper	
2022	Crisis Core: Final Fantasy VII Reunion	Professor Hojo	
2022	Back 4 Blood	Heng	Tunnels of Terror DLC
2023	Avatar: The Last Airbender - Quest for Balance	Ozai, Master Yu	
2024	Final Fantasy VII Rebirth	Professor Hojo	
2024	Teenage Mutant Ninja Turtles: Mutants Unleashed	Splinter	
2026	Avatar Legends: The Fighting Game	Ozai	
