= Kung Fu Panda Holiday =

Animated Christmas television special

- Written by: Jonathan Groff; Jon Pollack
- Directed by: Tim Johnson
- Starring: Jack Black; Angelina Jolie; Dustin Hoffman; Jack McBrayer; Jackie Chan; Seth Rogen; David Cross; Lucy Liu; James Hong; Dan Fogler
- Theme music composer: Henry Jackman
- Country of origin: United States
- Original language: English

Production
- Producer: Melissa Cobb
- Editors: C.K. Horness; Marcus Taylor
- Running time: 25 minutes
- Production company: DreamWorks Animation

Original release
- Network: NBC
- Release: November 24, 2010

Related
- Secrets of the Furious Five; Kung Fu Panda 2

Kung Fu Panda Holiday, also known as Kung Fu Panda: Po's Winter Wonderland, is a 2010 American animated Christmas comedy drama television special produced by DreamWorks Animation and directed by Tim Johnson. A spinoff of the Kung Fu Panda franchise, the special stars the voices of Jack Black, Angelina Jolie, Dustin Hoffman, Jackie Chan, Seth Rogen, David Cross, Lucy Liu, James Hong and Jack McBrayer. The special premiered on NBC November 24, 2010, and its premiere broadcast drew 5.9 million viewers.

== Plot ==
A few months after the events of the first film, the Valley of Peace is preparing for the Winter Festival. Master Shifu tasks Po with hosting the Winter Feast at the Jade Palace, an event that is attended by the masters of China’s twenty nine kung fu schools. After Po and the Furious Five fight a group of bandits, Shifu explains traditional gestures and responsibilities that are involved with the Winter Feast to Po, burdening Po. When Po proposes inviting his father, Mr. Ping, Shifu reveals that guests are not allowed to attend. Despite understanding that Po wants to spend time with his father, Shifu reminds him that he is now the Dragon Warrior.

When Po is supposed to hire a chef to cater the event, he decides to have his father cater the event, so he rejects the finest chefs in China. However, Mr. Ping, who has been suffering from empty nest syndrome, stays at his restaurant to serve the townspeople who have no other dining options during the Winter Festival and advises Po to do the right thing. Po tries to cook the feast by himself but he is overwhelmed by various responsibilities that come with it, further complicated by the interference of Wo Hop, a rabbit chef from Heilongjiang who he had accidentally disgraced when he was supposed to hire a chef. A comment from Wo Hop about kung fu being unable to solve everything inspires Po to enlist the Five to complete the preparations for the feast while he has Wo Hop help him cook the food.

When Po sets out to the village to get more flaked jasmine after the preparations are completed, he gazes in awe at the display of lanterns and decorations and he pauses morosely when he witnesses the fun of families and friends together. During the feast, he cannot enjoy it as much as he admires the visiting kung fu masters. He explains his traditions of having fun with his father and his neighbors during the Winter Festival and leaves the Jade Palace, much to Shifu’s horror. When Po returns to the noodle shop, Mr. Ping, who realized that he was being unfair about his son’s responsibilities, apologizes for making his son feel guilty.

With this reconciliation, they cook noodle soup with polished skill. Moved by Po's loyalty to his father, the Five and the visiting kung fu masters go to the noodle shop. Po restores Wo Hop's honor by giving him the Golden Ladle that was originally intended for the chef who was selected to cook for the feast. Shifu, who followed the Five and the visiting kung fu masters, realizes that Po did the right thing when he sees how much fun everyone is having. He turns to leave but Po convinces him to join the party. Feng, the Jade Palace’s artist, paints a picture of them, Mr. Ping, the Five, and Wo Hop.

== Voice cast ==
- Jack Black as Po
- Angelina Jolie as Master Tigress
- Dustin Hoffman as Master Shifu
- Jack McBrayer as Wo Hop
- Jackie Chan as Master Monkey
- Seth Rogen as Master Mantis
- Jonathan Groff as Master Rhino
- David Cross as Master Crane
- Lucy Liu as Master Viper
- James Hong as Mr. Ping
- Dan Fogler as Zeng
- Susan Fitzer as Shop Owner, Baby Bunny, Host Goose
- Lena Golia as Little Bunny
- Stephen Kearin as Father, Village Bunny
- Tom Owens as Dream Bunny, Panicked Pig
- Conrad Vernon as Boar Bandit
- Mick Wingert as Goose Attendant, Pig Tailor

== Reception ==
In her review for Common Sense Media, Emily Ashby praised its positive messages and role models, from which Po "learns that listening to your heart is the best way to make the right decision, and his choice inspires others to do the same".

== Home media ==
The special was released on DVD and Blu-ray November 6, 2012, in North America. In Australia and the UK, it was released under the title, Kung Fu Panda: Po's Winter Wonderland, which was released November 11, 2012, and November 19, 2012, exclusively at Sainsbury's stores. It was re-released on DVD October 1, 2013, along with Shrek the Halls, Merry Madagascar and Gift of the Night Fury.
