= Kung Fu Panda: Secrets of the Scroll =

- Film poster
- Directed by: Rodolphe Guenoden
- Written by: Paul McEvoy
- Produced by: Karen Foster
- Starring: Jack Black; Dustin Hoffman; Seth Rogen; David Cross; Lucy Liu; Tara Macri; James Hong; Randall Duk Kim
- Narrated by: Randall Duk Kim
- Edited by: Mark Deimel
- Music by: Lorne Balfe; Hans Zimmer
- Production company: DreamWorks Animation
- Distributed by: 20th Century Fox Home Entertainment
- Release date: December 15, 2015
- Running time: 23 minutes
- Country: United States
- Language: English

Kung Fu Panda: Secrets of the Scroll is a 2015 American animated short film produced by DreamWorks Animation. It was included on the 2015 digital HD, and the 2016 Blu-ray and DVD re-release of the animated films Kung Fu Panda (2008) and its sequel Kung Fu Panda 2 (2011). The short tells both the stories of how the Furious Five came together, and how Po gained his love for kung fu.

Jack Black, James Hong, Dustin Hoffman, Seth Rogen, David Cross, Randall Duk Kim and Lucy Liu reprise their roles from the movies, while Kari Wahlgren and James Sie replace Angelina Jolie and Jackie Chan as Tigress and Monkey, respectively.

== Plot ==
Some time before the events of the third film, Po realizes that his father, Mr. Ping, is giving away his things as bonus gifts to customers, and has accidentally given away his action figures of the Furious Five. As he searches for them, Master Oogway's narration asks whether there is any real difference between an accident and destiny, thus setting the scene for the story.

Ten years before the events of the first film, Tigress is training under Master Shifu, but always seems to disappoint him by not conforming to his strict style. When Oogway and Shifu order noodles from Mr. Ping’s restaurant, young Po, left in charge while his father is away, accidentally sneezes into Shifu’s bowl, making him sick. Meanwhile, a fierce warrior named Boar is headed to the Valley of Peace, defeating every kung fu master in his path. With Shifu incapacitated, he assigns Tigress the task of stopping Boar, giving her a scroll with the names of four warriors who can help. At the same time, Po writes his own list of possible future careers, but throws it away at his father’s urging. Tigress loses her scroll and accidentally takes Po’s instead.

Po’s list includes “Cleaner,” “Comedian,” “Dancer,” and “Doctor,” leading Tigress to recruit Crane (the Cleaner), Monkey (the Comedian), Viper (the Dancer), and Mantis (the Doctor) instead of the intended fighters. Impressed by their unique skills, she believes Shifu will be pleased. However, when the mix-up is revealed, Shifu is angry, leaving Tigress disheartened. Encouraged by Oogway to be herself, Tigress confronts Boar but is defeated when she imitates Shifu’s style. With help from her mismatched team, who stall Boar using their distinct abilities, she realizes her own style is key. Embracing it, she overpowers Boar with their support. Po witnesses the battle, sparking his love for kung fu. Back at the Jade Palace, Shifu admits his pride in Tigress, granting her full access to train in her style and inviting Crane, Monkey, Viper, and Mantis to stay and hone their own techniques.

Back in the present, Po finds his toys with a bunny boy. While watching the boy play with the same passion that he had all those years ago, Po decides to let the bunny keep them. Po then admits to the Five that his toys are "where they're meant to be", and that, in fact, he already has the "real thing right here".

== Voice cast ==
- Jack Black as Po
- Dustin Hoffman as Shifu and Warrior
- Randall Duk Kim as Oogway
- Kari Wahlgren as Tigress
  - Tara Macri as Teenage Tigress
- Seth Rogen as Mantis
- David Cross as Crane
- Lucy Liu as Viper
- James Sie as Monkey and Great Master Viper
- James Hong as Mr Ping
- Eliott Guenodeon as Young Bunny and Young Pig
- Stephen Kearin as Master Mongrel
- Joseph Izzo as Palace Goose and Sheep
- Jerry Clarke as Gorilla
- Kelly Stables as Mother Bunny
- Jayden Lund as Boar
- Peter Cilella as Goat

== Accolades ==
Award	Date of ceremony	Category	Recipient(s)	Result	Ref(s)
Annie Awards	February 4, 2017	Best Animated Special Production	Kung Fu Panda: Secrets of the Scroll	Nominated	
