= Legendary Warriors =

Legendary Warriors may refer to:

== Video games ==
- Kung Fu Panda: Legendary Warriors, a video game for the Nintendo DS and Wii based on the Kung Fu Panda movie series

== Other uses ==
- Ten Legendary Warriors (Digimon) in the Digimon Frontier anime series
