= Jonathan Aibel and Glenn Berger =

American screenwriter & producer duo

Jonathan Aibel
- Born: Jonathan Robert Aibel; August 6, 1969 (age 57); Demarest, New Jersey, U.S.
- Occupations: Screenwriter, producer
- Years active: 1994–present

Glenn Berger
- Born: Glenn Todd Berger; August 26, 1969 (age 57); Smithtown, New York, U.S.
- Occupations: Screenwriter, producer
- Years active: 1994–present

Jonathan Robert Aibel (born August 6, 1969, in Demarest, New Jersey) and Glenn Todd Berger (born August 26, 1969, in Smithtown, New York) are American screenwriters and producers, who are best known for writing the Kung Fu Panda movies, The SpongeBob Movie: Sponge Out of Water, Trolls, and its sequel Trolls World Tour.

== Filmography ==
=== Television ===
Year	Title	Writers	Executive Producers	Notes
1994	The George Carlin Show	Yes	No	
1995	Platypus Man	Yes	No	
1995–1996	Can't Hurry Love	Yes	No	Also story editors
1995–1997	Madtv	Yes	No	
1996	Blazing Dragons	Additional	No	
1997–2002	King of the Hill	Yes	Yes	Also story editors
2003	A.U.S.A.	Yes	Yes	

=== Film ===
Year	Title	Writers	Producers	Director
2008	Kung Fu Panda	Yes	Co-Producers	John Stevenson; Mark Osborne
2009	Monsters vs. Aliens	Yes	No	Conrad Vernon; Rob Letterman
2009	Alvin and the Chipmunks: The Squeakquel	Yes	No	Betty Thomas
2011	Kung Fu Panda 2	Yes	Co-Producers	Jennifer Yuh Nelson
2011	Alvin and the Chipmunks: Chipwrecked	Yes	No	Mike Mitchell
2015	The SpongeBob Movie: Sponge Out of Water	Yes	No	Paul Tibbitt; Mike Mitchell (live-action sequences)
2016	Kung Fu Panda 3	Yes	Co-Producers	Jennifer Yuh Nelson; Alessandro Carloni
2016	Trolls	Yes	Co-Producers	Mike Mitchell
2016	Monster Trucks	Story	Executive	Chris Wedge
2020	Trolls World Tour	Yes	No	Walt Dohrn
2020	The SpongeBob Movie: Sponge on the Run	Story	No	Tim Hill
2022	Luck	Story	No	Peggy Holmes
2023	Trolls Band Together	No	Executive	Walt Dohrn
2024	Kung Fu Panda 4	Yes	Co-Producers	Mike Mitchell

Other credits

Year	Film	Role
2007	Shrek the Third	Special thanks
2010	Shrek Forever After	Special thanks
2011	Kung Fu Panda: Secrets of the Masters	Special thanks
