= Kung Fu Panda: Secrets of the Masters =

- Home video release poster
- Directed by: Tony Leondis
- Written by: Todd Berger; Paul McEvoy
- Produced by: Karen Foster
- Starring: Jack Black; Angelina Jolie; Randall Duk Kim; Dennis Haysbert; Tony Leondis; Paul Scheer; Sumalee Montano; Dustin Hoffman
- Edited by: Marcus Taylor
- Music by: Lorne Balfe; Hans Zimmer; John Powell
- Production companies: DreamWorks Animation; Duncan Studio
- Distributed by: Paramount Home Entertainment
- Release date: December 13, 2011
- Running time: 24 minutes
- Country: United States
- Language: English

Kung Fu Panda: Secrets of the Masters is a 2011 American animated short film produced by DreamWorks Animation. It was released December 13, 2011, as a special feature attached to the 2011 animated film Kung Fu Panda 2 DVD and Blu-ray. The short consists mostly of a traditional animation (17 minutes), created by Duncan Studio. It uncovers the backgrounds of the masters of Gongmen City: Master Thundering Rhino, Master Storming Ox, and Master Croc.

A significant feature has Jack Black, Dustin Hoffman, Angelina Jolie, Seth Rogen, Randall Duk Kim and Dennis Haysbert reprising their roles from the movies. However, Jean-Claude Van Damme and Victor Garber did not reprise their roles from the sequel.

== Plot ==
Some time after saving China from being conquered by Lord Shen, during the night, under the pretense of an emergency, Po leads Tigress and Mantis in breaking into the new Masters' Council exhibit, in tribute of Masters Thundering Rhino, Storming Ox and Croc. Although Tigress and Mantis are annoyed at the deception, Po engages their interest in the story of how the trio of masters first met.

Long ago, in the city of Jinzhou, where kung fu was practiced for the sport of street fighting, Rhino, Ox and Croc were small-time pit fighters who attracted the attention of Master Oogway, who, seeing their talent and focus, wished them to find something worthy for which to fight. As the trio fought to a standstill, two of the villainous Wu Sisters were freeing their leader and eldest sister, Su Wu. To recapture them, Oogway persuades Rhino, Ox and Croc to help him find the sisters at Hubei Volcano. However, to his disappointment, Oogway has to appeal to them with vague prospects of being put on a path to riches to get that cooperation.

While the Wu Sisters plot to unite the various criminal gangs to seize control of China, Oogway has to brush off each of his compatriot's petty proposals during the journey to abandon the others for their benefit. At camp, Oogway discovers that, although Croc and Ox are motivated by narcissism and greed, respectively, Rhino has a deep-seated need to win the respect of his father, Master Flying Rhino. To that, Oogway suggests to all that their current goals will keep them only wanting more, and "changing course" can lead to better lives for all. Before the trio can comprehend Oogway's point, a messenger bird from the Sisters arrives to reveal their plan, and Oogway has the company set off immediately.

To encourage them to change their ways, Oogway secretly leads the trio on an extremely dangerous path across the Bridge of Mists, and forces them to cooperate so they all can safely pass, to illustrate his point of selflessness. However, when the trio finally learns that Oogway's metaphorical promise of riches actually meant "emotional riches", their protests accidentally get them trapped on a river of lava. Oogway manages to get them to safe ground, but he falls over a lava fall, leaving them with only the advice, "Remember the path", to guide them.

Dispirited by their loss, the trio try to find their way home. However, they encounter a rabbit village devastated by the Wu Sisters, and its citizens desperately try to hire them for protection. Moved by the villagers' plight, the trio decline the fee and resolve to stop the Wu Sisters, for the sake of a higher ideal.

The trio interrupt the Wu Sister's summit, and reveal that they are doing this purely for honor, which intimidates the various visiting gangs to retreat, while the Wu Sisters fight alone. Although the Wu Sisters prove too much to fight individually, Rhino, Ox and Croc manage to combine their talents to defeat them in a coordinated attack. At the moment of their victory, Oogway, who somehow survived, reappears, captures the rest of the gangs, and praises the trio for being worthy warriors who have found a higher purpose.

The scene returns to the exhibit in the morning, where Po concludes the story of how the new masters formed the Masters' Council in Gongmen City until Master Shifu discovers them. Although not furious, he still sets Po to work to repair the roof he damaged breaking in, before the exhibit opens in twenty minutes. Po accidentally locks himself in a sarcophagus that once served as Su Wu's prison cell, but he decides to take a power nap instead, leaving the roof unfixed.

== Voice cast ==
- Jack Black as Po
- Angelina Jolie as Tigress
- Dustin Hoffman as Shifu
- Randall Duk Kim as Oogway
- Seth Rogen as Mantis
- Todd Berger as Pig Server
- David Cowgill as Flying Rhino
- Donald Fullilove as Gorilla Guard #1
- Dennis Haysbert as Young Storming Ox
- Joseph Izzo as Little Birdie
- Tony Leondis as Young Croc
- Edie Mirman as Mother Bunny
- Sumalee Montano as Su Wu / Wing Wu / Wan Wu
- Michelle Ruff as Money Bunny
- Paul Scheer as Young Thundering Rhino
- Paul Vogt as Pig Announcer

== Awards ==
Secrets of the Masters won a 2012 Annie Award for Best Animated Special Production.
