= Furious 5 =

Furious 5 or variation may refer to:

- The Furious Five, NYC hip hop group associated with Grandmaster Flash and Melle Mel
- The Furious Five, animated film characters, see list of Kung Fu Panda characters
- Fast Five, 2011 film by Justin Lin, fifth part of the Fast & Furious film series
