= Kung Fu Panda 3 =

2016 DreamWorks Animation film

- Theatrical release poster
- Directed by: Jennifer Yuh Nelson; Alessandro Carloni
- Written by: Jonathan Aibel; Glenn Berger
- Produced by: Melissa Cobb
- Starring: Jack Black; Bryan Cranston; Dustin Hoffman; Angelina Jolie; J. K. Simmons; Seth Rogen; Lucy Liu; David Cross; Kate Hudson; James Hong; Randall Duk Kim; Jackie Chan
- Edited by: Clare Knight
- Music by: Hans Zimmer
- Production companies: DreamWorks Animation; China Film Co., Ltd.; Oriental DreamWorks; Zhou Ming You Ying Film
- Distributed by: 20th Century Fox (Note: In 2018, the film's distribution rights were transferred from 20th Century Fox to Universal Pictures, following NBCUniversal's acquisition of DreamWorks Animation in 2016.) (Note: Excluding South Korea (CJ Entertainment).) (Worldwide); China Film Group (China)
- Release dates: January 23, 2016 (China); January 29, 2016 (United States)
- Running time: 95 minutes
- Countries: United States; China
- Language: English
- Budget: $145 million
- Box office: $521 million

Kung Fu Panda 3 is a 2016 animated martial arts comedy film directed by Jennifer Yuh Nelson and Alessandro Carloni, and written by Jonathan Aibel and Glenn Berger. Produced by DreamWorks Animation and Oriental DreamWorks, it is the third installment in the Kung Fu Panda franchise and the sequel to Kung Fu Panda 2 (2011). Jack Black, Dustin Hoffman, Angelina Jolie, Seth Rogen, Lucy Liu, David Cross, James Hong, Jackie Chan, and Jean-Claude Van Damme reprise their roles from the previous films, with Randall Duk Kim reprising his from the first film. They are joined by Bryan Cranston, J. K. Simmons and Kate Hudson as new characters. In the film, Po is reunited with his birth father, and discovers the existence of a secret panda village, but must learn to master chi and prepare the pandas to fight against General Kai, a spirit warrior intent on destroying Master Oogway's legacy.

Kung Fu Panda 3 premiered at the TCL Chinese Theatre in Los Angeles on January 16, 2016. It received a limited release in China on January 23, and was released by 20th Century Fox in the United States on January 29. The film received generally positive reviews for its visuals and narrative, and grossed $521 million against a $145 million budget. It was followed by two animated television series, Kung Fu Panda: The Paws of Destiny, which premiered in 2018, and Kung Fu Panda: The Dragon Knight, which premiered in 2022. A fourth film, Kung Fu Panda 4, was theatrically released in 2024.

== Plot ==
In the Spirit Realm, Master Oogway fights General Kai, who has stolen the chi from every other deceased kung fu master. As Kai drains his chi, Oogway warns him that someone is destined to stop him before becoming a jade amulet. Kai uses the stolen chi to return to the Mortal Realm and is enraged to find he has been forgotten from history.

Meanwhile, Master Shifu announces his retirement from teaching and names Po his successor, but Po's first attempts to teach the Furious Five fails. Afterwards, Shifu, who predicted the calamity, advises Po to be himself and master chi. Disheartened, Po returns home, where he meets a panda named Li Shan, who received a message from the universe that his son was alive. (Note: As depicted at the ending of Kung Fu Panda 2 (2011)) Both quickly realize Li is Po's biological father and they immediately bond, much to the dismay and jealousy of Po's adoptive father, Mr. Ping.

After Po introduces Li to Shifu and the Five, they defend the Valley of Peace from Kai's jade zombies, clones of the kung fu masters who had their chi stolen. The group learns that Kai and Oogway were once allies, with Kai saving Oogway after an ambush left him injured by taking him to a hidden panda village in the mountains. There, the pandas taught Oogway the art of giving chi, but Kai began stealing chi for his own gain, prompting Oogway to banish him to the Spirit Realm. Li offers to take Po to the village to learn chi so he can defeat Kai, while Shifu and the Five remain to protect the Valley. Mr. Ping accompanies Po, driven by jealousy toward Li. In the village, Po meets other pandas, and Li tells him he will teach him chi once he has learned to live as a panda.

Determined to eradicate Oogway’s legacy, Kai demolishes the Jade Palace and absorbs the chi of every living kung fu master, sparing only Tigress, who escapes to warn Po of the devastation. When Po urges Li to teach him chi immediately, Li admits he lied about knowing it because he was afraid of losing Po again. Feeling betrayed, Po disowns Li and begins solitary training to confront Kai. Mr. Ping consoles Li, assuring him that Po will one day forgive him. While training, Po plans to get close enough to Kai to put him in a Wuxi Finger Hold and send him back to the Spirit Realm. Li, Mr. Ping, and the pandas ask Po to teach them kung fu so they can take down Kai together. Learning from his previous failures, Po trains them to use their everyday activities as kung fu skills instead of copying his moves. In between training, Po and Li make amends.

Kai arrives at the village with his jade zombies, prompting Li, Mr. Ping, Tigress, and all the pandas to fight back, distracting him just long enough for Po to attempt the Wuxi Finger Hold. Kai reveals it only works on mortals, not spirits like himself, and overpowers Po. To save everyone, Po tricks Kai, leaps onto him, and uses the Wuxi Finger Hold on himself, sending them both to the Spirit Realm. There, an enraged Kai attacks and starts stealing Po’s chi. In the Mortal Realm, Li rallies the others to send their chi to Po, restoring his strength and empowering him. Po then overloads Kai with chi, freeing the kung fu masters and returning their energy.

Po encounters Oogway, who explains he chose Po as the Dragon Warrior for his potential to master kung fu and chi, and names him his successor, endowing him with the Staff of Wisdom. Using it, Po returns to the Mortal Realm, reunites joyfully with his fathers and friends, and embraces his new role at the restored Jade Palace, training the pandas and the Valley of Peace in kung fu and chi.

== Voice cast ==
- Jack Black as Po, the panda protagonist and the Dragon Warrior.
- Bryan Cranston as Li Shan, Po’s biological father. Cranston replaces Fred Tatasciore, who had briefly voiced Li Shan in Kung Fu Panda 2.
- James Hong as Mr. Ping, Po’s adoptive Chinese goose father.
- Angelina Jolie as Master Tigress, a female South China tiger.
- J. K. Simmons as General Kai, a chi-stealing yak spirit warrior, former friend of Oogway, and the film’s main antagonist.
- Dustin Hoffman as Master Shifu, a red panda and Po’s master.
- Jackie Chan as Master Monkey, a golden snub-nosed monkey.
- Seth Rogen as Master Mantis, a Chinese mantis.
- David Cross as Master Crane, a black-necked crane.
- Lucy Liu as Master Viper, a green tree-viper
- Randall Duk Kim as Grand Master Oogway, a wise tortoise and former friend of Kai.
- Kate Hudson as Mei Mei, a ribbon dancing panda.
- Steele Gagnon as Bao, a panda cub.
- Liam Knight as Lei Lei, a panda cub. Knight previously voiced Baby Po in Kung Fu Panda 2.
- Barbara Dirikson as Grandma Panda.
- Willie Geist as Sum.
- Al Roker as Dim.
- Wayne Knight as Big Fun, Hom-Lee.
- Pax Jolie-Pitt as Yoo.
- Knox Jolie-Pitt as Ku Ku.
- Zahara Jolie-Pitt as Meng Meng.
- Shiloh Jolie-Pitt as Shuai Shuai.
- Ming Tsai as Ming.
- Fred Tatasciore as Master Bear. Tatasciore previously voiced Li Shan in Kung Fu Panda 2 and Master Shifu in the animated series Kung Fu Panda: Legends of Awesomeness.
- Stephen Kearin as Master Chicken.
- Jean-Claude Van Damme as Master Croc.
- Mike Mitchell as Male Palace Goose, Smart Panda Villager.
- Kelly Cooney as Female Palace Goose.
- Mick Wingert as the Goose and Rabbit farmers. Wingert previously voiced Po in Kung Fu Panda: Legends of Awesomeness, further reprising the role after Kung Fu Panda 3 in the direct spin-off series Kung Fu Panda: The Paws of Destiny.

== Production ==
=== Development ===
In 2010, DreamWorks Animation (DWA) CEO Jeffrey Katzenberg announced that the Kung Fu Panda franchise was planned to have six movies, or "chapters", altogether. In July 2012, Kung Fu Panda 3 was officially confirmed by Bill Damaschke, DWA's chief creative officer.

The film is a co-production between DreamWorks Animation and Oriental DreamWorks, a Shanghai-based animation studio founded in 2012 as a partnership between DreamWorks Animation and Chinese companies. One third of the film was made in China, and the rest in the United States at DWA. This was the first time that any major American animated feature film had been co-produced with a Chinese firm. The filmmakers worked closely with SAPPRFT to ensure the film's release in China. As a film with a co-production status in China, it allowed the production companies to circumvent the country's strict import quota, and take a greater share of box-office revenue than imported films. To ensure the film's success in China, in addition to the English version, the Chinese version of the film was also fully animated, making them the only versions that have the characters' lips synchronized with their voices.

=== Casting ===
Kung Fu Panda 3 saw the crew from the second film reunite, including director Jennifer Yuh Nelson, producer Melissa Cobb, screenplay writers Jonathan Aibel and Glenn Berger, and Guillermo del Toro as executive producer. Initially, Nelson was to direct the film alone, but by February 2015, Alessandro Carloni had joined her as a co-director. According to the report, Carloni, who had worked as an animation supervisor on the first film and a story artist on the second, joined Nelson after she requested strengthening "the director's bench" to ensure that the film be completed in a timely manner.

On April 9, 2013, DreamWorks Animation announced that Rebel Wilson, Bryan Cranston and Mads Mikkelsen had joined the cast. By April 2015, J. K. Simmons had replaced Mikkelsen, whose character had been rewritten. Five months later, Wilson was replaced by Kate Hudson due to an extended production schedule. The studio had to reanimate previously completed scenes to reflect Hudson's interpretation of the character.

The film's antagonist, General Kai, is the first supernatural villain of the Kung Fu Panda film series. Described by del Toro as "the most formidable villain yet", the creators wanted him to stand apart from his predecessors. Nelson reasoned, "You can't go brawler because Tai Lung was brawler. You can't go smarter because Shen was smarter. Where can you go? You have to go supernatural, bigger, and even more intimidating."

=== Music ===
On July 25, 2014, it was announced that Hans Zimmer, who co-scored the first two Kung Fu Panda movies with John Powell, would return to score the film. The score is performed by the London Session Orchestra, includes choir pieces performed by The Metro Voices and Shanghai Roxi Musical Studio Choirs, and features performances from renowned Asian musicians, such as Chinese pianist Lang Lang, Chinese cellist Jian Wang, erhu musician Guo Gan, Chinese pipa player Wu Man, Taiwanese pop singer Jay Chou, and Canadian-Taiwanese singer Patrick Brasca, who, with Chou, performs the main theme, "Try", in the end credits.

The soundtrack album was released January 29, 2016, on Sony Classical. Powell did not return for the third installment, but, despite this, most of the themes on which he collaborated with Zimmer were worked into the score. Many themes from the score contain portions of the garage rock song, "I'm So Sorry", by the American pop-rock band, Imagine Dragons. For the soundtrack, the song was portioned in the tracks, "The Arrival of Kai", "The Hall of Heroes", "The Legend of Kai", "Jaded", "Po Belongs", "Kai Is Closer", "The Battle of Legends" and "The Spirit Realm". The soundtrack also includes additional music composed by Chinese-American composer Nathan Wang, and Scottish composers Lorne Balfe, and Paul Mounsey. The orchestrator for the ethnic instruments overdub sessions was Derrick Werlé.

== Release ==
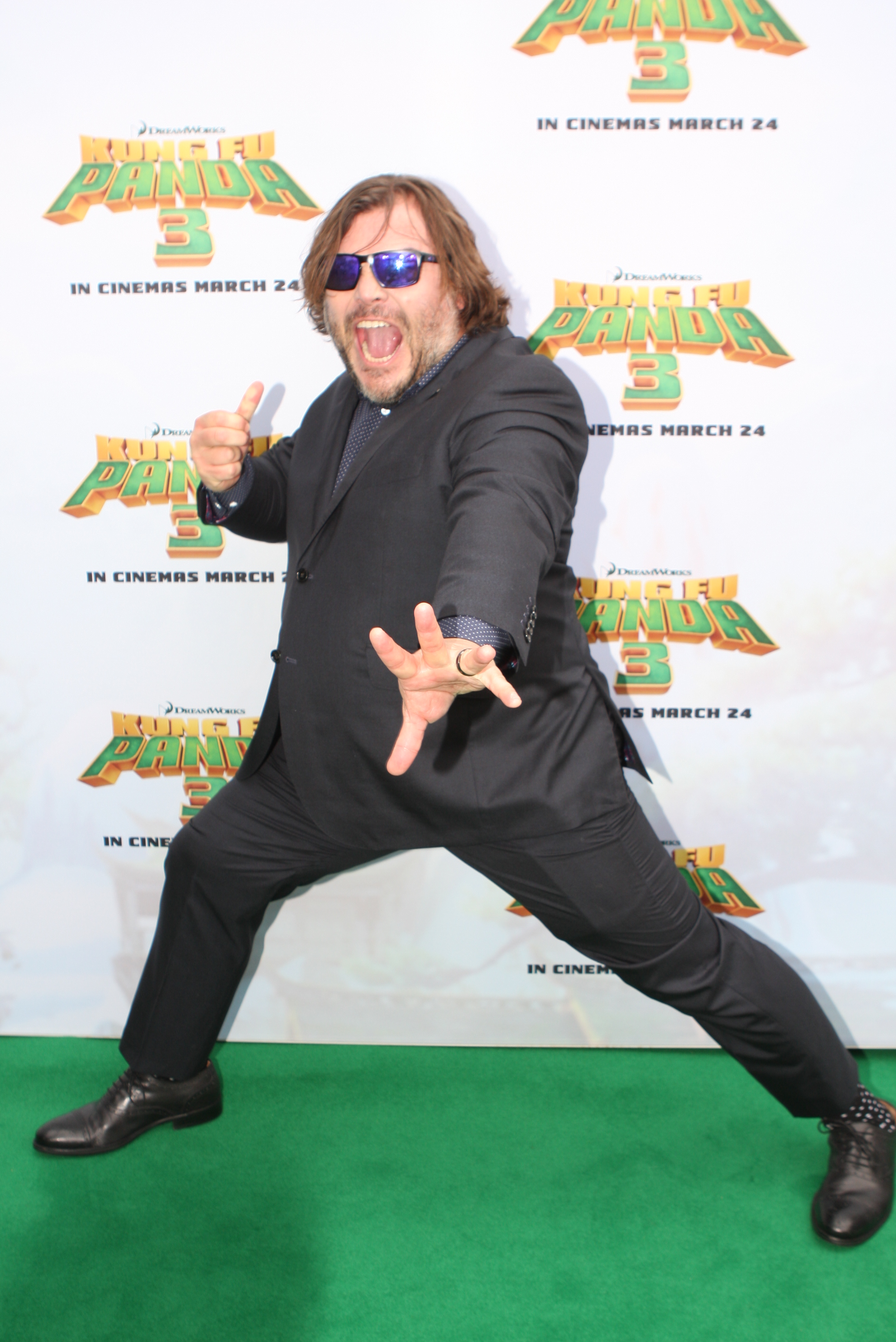
Jack Black at the film's Australian premiere in Sydney in March 2016

=== Theatrical ===
In September 2012, it was announced that Kung Fu Panda 3 would be released on March 18, 2016. On April 9, 2013, the film's release date was moved up to December 23, 2015. In December 2014, the film was delayed to its original release date of March 18, 2016, to avoid competition with Star Wars: The Force Awakens, taking the slot of another DreamWorks Animation film, The Boss Baby, which in turn was pushed back to March 31, 2017. In April 2015, the release date was again brought forward, this time to January 29, 2016. AMC Theatres partnered with Fox and DreamWorks Animation to play the movie in Mandarin at seven theaters, and in Spanish at 14 locations in the U.S and Canada, creating a mix of subtitled and dubbed formats of Kung Fu Panda 3. This marked the first time that AMC presented a major theatrical release in Mandarin. The film had a day-and-date release in South Korea, Russia, Ukraine, Jamaica, Puerto Rico and China on January 28, 2016, and in the U.S. and Canada on January 29. Other markets followed in March and April of the same year. According to Deadline Hollywood, the strategy behind such a staggered release was to take advantage of certain opportunistic dates that presented themselves, such as the Chinese New Year in February for China.

=== Home media ===
The film was released on Blu-ray and DVD on June 28, 2016. A 4K Ultra-HD release from Universal Pictures Home Entertainment was released on March 3, 2026.

== Reception ==
=== Box office ===
Kung Fu Panda 3 grossed $143.5 million in the United States and Canada, and $377.6 million in other territories, for a worldwide total of $521.2 million; it is the lowest-grossing film in the series. According to Deadline Hollywood, the film made a net profit of $80.65 million, making it one of the top-20 most profitable releases of 2016.

In the United States and Canada, early speculation anticipated that the film would open to about $40–45 million from 3,955 theaters, with Box Office Mojo reporting as high as a $53 million opening, on par with Kung Fu Panda 2's $47.7 million opening in 2011, but a significant decrease from the first film's $60.2 million opening in 2008. However, DreamWorks Animation and Fox gave a more conservative estimate of a "mid-$40 million" opening. Paul Dergarabedian, a senior analyst at Rentrak, said that the film's opening "should land somewhere between the first two installments", noting that the film will likely appeal to families "with few options for appropriate entertainment at the multiplex of late". On January 27, two days before the film's release, Fandango reported that Kung Fu Panda 3 was the top advance-ticket seller for the weekend, outperforming previous DreamWorks Animation films, Home and Kung Fu Panda 2, at the same point in their sale cycles. Box-office pundits also noted that the film did not face any serious competition with other new releases, such as The Finest Hours and Fifty Shades of Black, nor with holdovers The Revenant and Star Wars: The Force Awakens; all were expected to gross close to $10 million.

In North America, Kung Fu Panda 3 topped the box office in its debut weekend, with $41.3 million, making it the best opening weekend for an animated film in January, and the third-highest weekend debut ever for the month. The film continued to top the North American box office during its second weekend, grossing $21.2 million.

In China, expectations were high for the film, with Nancy Tartaglione of Deadline Hollywood anticipating a bigger opening weekend than in the U.S., and a higher total gross. Conservative estimates for Kung Fu Panda 3's opening in China ranged from $35 million to $50 million. Before the film's official Chinese release, it was already projected to surpass Monkey King: Hero Is Back as the country's highest-grossing animated film — it had earned $153 million at the box office in 2015 — because Kung Fu Panda 3 had the advantages of opening a week before the Chinese New Year and Valentine's Day, as well as debuting during the school holidays in the Lunar New Year "blackout" period that prohibits the release of foreign films; it therefore did not face competition from major Hollywood productions.

The film had a limited theatrical release in China January 22, 2016, a week before its release in the United States. A three-hour special sneak preview was screened, earning $6.4 million from two different versions of the film, topping the daily box-office charts. Buoyed by word of mouth, the film had a single-day opening of $16.3 million, the biggest of 2016 to that point, earning a total of $23.1 million, including previews from its Saturday showings, giving Kung Fu Panda 3 one of China's highest-grossing openings.

=== Critical response ===
On Rotten Tomatoes, the film holds a approval rating of 87%, based on 179 reviews, with an average rating of 6.90/10. The site's critical consensus reads, "Kung Fu Panda 3 boasts the requisite visual splendor, but like its rotund protagonist, this sequel's narrative is also surprisingly nimble, adding up to animated fun for the whole family." On Metacritic, the film has a score of 66 out of 100, based on 34 critics, indicating "generally favorable" reviews. Audiences polled by CinemaScore gave the film an average grade of "A" on a scale of A+ to F.

IGN gave the film a score of 8.5 out of 10, commenting that "Kung Fu Panda 3 offers a fun-filled, action-packed conclusion to DreamWorks' endearing animated series". Screen Rant awarded it 2.5 out of 5, saying, "At times, it's a beautiful movie, filled with likable characters, as well as digestible gags, that should keep kids smiling and giggling–but, with a plethora of more ambitious animated options out there, passable might not justify the money (or time) required for a viewing." Glenn Kenny of RogerEbert.com awarded Kung Fu Panda 3 three stars out of four, and wrote that the film, "in spite of its abundant action–and for all the interspecies mashups, this is as much an action-adventure animated movie as it is a funny-animal animated movie–is a pretty relaxing experience for the adult viewer".

Justin Chang of Variety gave a positive review, saying that "a winning lightness of touch prevails in this delightful continuation of the durable DreamWorks franchise".

Christian Holub of Entertainment Weekly gave Kung Fu Panda 3 a rating of B, commenting that the film was "just complicated enough to reward steady viewers and just simple enough for parent escorts to enjoy without much prior knowledge".

Michael Rechtshaffen of The Hollywood Reporter wrote, "While the storyline, in which Jack Black's dumpling-downing Dragon Warrior is reunited with his biological father, doesn't quite fulfill its prophecies, dramatically speaking, visually speaking it's all quite impressive–one of those very rare animated features that completely justifies its 3D glasses."

Marter Parkinson of The Escapist gave the film three stars out of five, saying that "Kung Fu Panda 3 can best be described as 'another one'", and called it "just a slight variation of the story told in the first film", as well as "a step down from the second film", but concluded that "it's a perfectly fine film, and if all you want is 'more of the same,' it won't disappoint".

Forbes gave a mixed review, negatively comparing Kung Fu Panda 3 to its predecessors, and describing it as "a comedown from the first two superb entries", but conceding that the film was "visually gorgeous and generally entertaining".

=== Accolades ===
Unlike its predecessors, this is the first Kung Fu Panda film not to be nominated for an Academy Award. At the 44th Annie Awards, Kung Fu Panda 3 received nominations for Best Animated Feature, Outstanding Achievement for Animated Effects in an Animated Production, Outstanding Achievement for Character Animation in a Feature Production, and Outstanding Achievement for Production Design in an Animated Feature Production. Jack Black was nominated for Best Virtual Performance at the 2016 MTV Movie Awards, and Most Wanted Pet at the 2017 Kids' Choice Awards. The film was also nominated at the Golden Trailer Awards for Best Animation/Family TV Spot, and the British Academy Children's Awards for Kid's Vote — Film. It earned a pair of nominations for Best Animated Film from the Saturn Awards and the Georgia Film Critics Association Awards.

== Video game ==
Kung Fu Panda: Showdown of Legendary Legends is a fighting video game that features characters from all three Kung Fu Panda films. Developed by Vicious Cycle Software, and published by Little Orbit, the game was released December 1, 2015, for Microsoft Windows, Xbox 360, PlayStation 3, Nintendo 3DS, Xbox One and PlayStation 4. The Wii U version was released December 15, 2015.

== Future ==
=== Sequel ===
On December 3, 2010, then-DreamWorks Animation CEO Jeffrey Katzenberg officially confirmed that the series could see three more sequels after Kung Fu Panda 3, bringing it to a six-film series. On January 13, 2016, Collider asked the filmmakers of Kung Fu Panda 3 about the possibility of a fourth film, with co-director Jennifer Yuh Nelson answering, "It's one at a time. We want to make this a perfect jewel, and then we'll see what happens after that," and co-director Alessandro Carloni replying, "With the sequels, we don't want to try to have them feel open-ended. We want it to feel like a completed journey, and we feel this movie does. And then, if a fantastic story presents itself, great." On August 2, 2018, when asked about any updates on Kung Fu Panda 4, Nelson replied that she did not know and had always seen the series as a trilogy, but that she was open to the idea of a fourth installment, as long as the focus remained on Po.

On August 12, 2022, DreamWorks Animation officially confirmed that Kung Fu Panda 4 was in production and set to be released on March 8, 2024.

In April 2023, during CinemaCon, it was announced that director Mike Mitchell will direct the film, with Stephanie Ma Stine as a co-director and Rebecca Huntley as a producer. Black revealed the story, which follows Po trying to find a new Dragon Warrior in a fox named Zhen while facing a new villain, the Chameleon, who can bring back to life deceased villains like Tai Lung, Lord Shen, and General Kai.

On December 12, 2023, it was announced that Awkwafina, Viola Davis and Ke Huy Quan would join the cast, playing Zhen, Chameleon and Han, respectively. It was also announced that Dustin Hoffman, Ian McShane, Bryan Cranston and James Hong would reprise their roles from the previous films.

=== Television series ===
On April 12, 2018, a spin-off animated series of Kung Fu Panda 3, titled Kung Fu Panda: The Paws of Destiny, received a 26-episode order from Amazon Prime Video. Airing across two 13-episode seasons, respectively released in their entireties November 16, 2018, and July 4, 2019, the series follows Po (voiced by Mick Wingert, reprising his role from the previous Kung Fu Panda animated series, Kung Fu Panda: Legends of Awesomeness) in the aftermath of Kung Fu Panda 3 as he mentors four young pandas — Nu Hai (voiced by Haley Tju), Jing (voiced by Laya Deleon Hayes), Bao (voiced by Gunnar Sizemore, replacing Steele Gagnon from Kung Fu Panda 3), and Fan Tong (voiced by Makana Say) — who become imbued with the chi of the ancient and powerful kung fu warriors known as the Four Constellations, rendering them the only ones able to save the world from an impending evil with their newfound kung fu powers.

On March 16, 2022, during National Panda Day, it was announced that another Kung Fu Panda animated series, set after Kung Fu Panda 3, and titled Kung Fu Panda: The Dragon Knight, would premiere on Netflix in July 2022, with Jack Black reprising his role as Po. The series follows Po as he must leave his home to embark on a globetrotting quest for redemption and justice that finds him partnered with a no-nonsense English knight known as the Wandering Blade.
