= Kung Fu Panda (video game) =

2008 video game

- North American cover art
- Developers: Luxoflux (PS3, Xbox 360); Beenox Shift (PC); XPEC Entertainment (PS2, Wii); Vicarious Visions (Nintendo DS); IronMonkey Studios (J2ME); TransGaming (Mac OS X)
- Publishers: Activision; EA Mobile (J2ME)
- Director: Joby-Rome Otero
- Producer: Brian Clarke
- Designer: Chris Hewish
- Composers: Kevin Manthei; Shawn Thomas Odyssey
- Platforms: Microsoft Windows, Nintendo DS, PlayStation 2, PlayStation 3, Wii, Xbox 360, J2ME, Mac OS X
- Release: WIN, NDS, PS2, PS3, Wii, XB360, J2ME: NA: June 3, 2008; AU: June 25, 2008; EU: June 27, 2008; Mac OS X: WW: March 18, 2009
- Genres: Action-adventure, platform
- Modes: Single-player, multiplayer

Kung Fu Panda is a 2008 action-adventure game loosely based on the 2008 film of the same name. Developed in a collaborative effort between Luxoflux, XPEC Entertainment, Beenox Shift, and Vicarious Visions, and published by Activision, the game was released for Microsoft Windows, PlayStation 3, Xbox 360, PlayStation 2, Wii, and Nintendo DS in June 2008. A version for mobile phones developed by IronMonkey Studios and published by EA Mobile was released the same month. A port for Mac OS X was developed by TransGaming and released in March 2009. It is about the quest of a giant panda named Po to become the Dragon Warrior.

== Gameplay ==
Gameplay of the Xbox 360 version

Kung Fu Panda is based on the movie Kung Fu Panda. Players initially control Po, who differs from the movie in that he possesses a basic level of martial arts skill from the beginning, enabling him to participate in battle. In addition to fighting and jumping challenges, maintaining balance is another important element of the game, such as Po crossing tightropes, staying on moving platforms, and steering a boat through a dangerous river. Over the course of the game's narrative, the player improves Po's skill by adding various new fighting techniques and special moves, although in some parts of the game, the player will have to complete the tasks as another character.

After collecting a number of coins at the end of each level, the player has the option to buy upgrades to Po's moves and health, as well as a different set of new outfits. Eventually, as the player progresses through the game, they'll be able to unlock other characters, including Master Shifu and the members of the Furious Five (a team of elite fighters each with their own fighting styles and mini-games). In addition, the player will be able to use objects and weapons when fighting. Furthermore, before each new level, Po narrates the continuing story, while the words are being scrolled up on the screen.

In the Wii version, the Wii Remote is used to perform moves and skills, such as the Wuxi Finger Hold; in the PlayStation 3 version, the motion sensors of the Sixaxis controller can be used to control Crane in missions where players play as him, while in the Nintendo DS version, while the D-pad moves Po, the touch screen is mainly used for combat moves, in the style of the DS version of Spider-Man 3, which was also developed by Vicarious Visions.

=== Multiplayer ===
The game includes a multiplayer mode with new levels and characters. In addition, the game features bosses, including the Great Gorilla, the Wu Sisters, and Nameless. The player can collect action figures of the Furious Five and rare coins and use them to unlock things at the Extras Menu.

== Plot ==
In Ancient China, Po Ping, a giant panda who has a dream of bringing down the Blackhoof Boar Clan as the Dragon Warrior, the most powerful Warrior in the land, before his father Mr. Ping, a goose who wakes him up for work at the family's noodle shop. The next day, the Tournament of the Dragon Warrior is held at the Jade Palace to determine which of the Furious Five (Tigress, Monkey, Crane, Viper, and Mantis) are worthy of being the Dragon Warrior. Attempting to view the tournament, Po lands in the center of the palace and is chosen as the Dragon Warrior.

As Po's training begins, Shifu, a red panda who receives word that Tai Lung, a snow leopard and his former apprentice, escaped from prison and is coming for the Dragon Scroll, the key to ultimate power. Po, after napping inside the Palace, stops the Blackhoof Boar Clan from stealing treasures. Po and Crane are sent to Lotus Lake and find that the Golden Croc Gang have taken over and are demanding the villagers give up their egg hatchlings. Po rescues the eggs and the leader's grandchild after Crane saves him from the sergeant in a fierce chase.

Po and Shifu head to Wudang Mountains to find some relics of Master Oogway, but they discover that Great Gorilla and his soldiers have arrived first. While Shifu defends the Wudang Temple, Po grabs the relics and defeats Great Gorilla. Back at Lotus Lake, Po and Shifu save several villagers from the Croc Gang, who returned despite Po's interference. After their victory, Shifu tells Po that the Furious Five have gone to fight Tai Lung themselves and leaves Po to find his way back to the Jade Palace.

When Shifu arrives back at the Wudang Mountains, a Wolf Slasher tells him that Tai Lung has already defeated and captured the Furious Five. Shifu fends off the Lang Shadow Army and the rest of the Great Gorilla’s Army, rescues the Furious Five and sends them back to the Jade Palace. Po, wandering the Lands, is looking for his way back to the Palace, but not before stumbling upon Tai Lung's training grounds and finding the Lair of the Wu Sisters. He is able to invade the Lair and defeat the Wu Sisters and finds a map back to the Jade Palace.

At the Palace, Shifu fends off the rest of the Lang Shadow Army and confronts Tai Lung himself. Po, who learns about this from Mr. Ping upon his arrival in the village, goes to the palace to stop Tai Lung and save Shifu. In an attempt to comfort his son, Mr. Ping tells him that his secret ingredient soup has no secret ingredient and is only made special by his belief in it. Po realizes that the same applies to him and that he has to believe he's the Dragon Warrior. Po gets help from Monkey and heads for the Jade Palace. Tai Lung fights and defeats Shifu and demands he give up the Dragon Scroll. Shifu refuses, saying he'd rather die than give it to him. Po arrives in time and takes on Tai Lung himself. After a fierce duel, Po uses the Wuxi Finger Hold and defeats him. Afterwards, the Valley celebrates Po’s victory.

== Reception ==
The game received generally positive reviews from critics. The Xbox 360 version of the game received a 6.5/10 from GameSpot, it scored a Metacritic rating of 75/100 from 42 critics. It also scored 7.5/10 from IGN. It also got a positive score of 8/10 from Game Informer.

In 2009, it won the International Animated Film Society's Annie Award for Best Animated Video Game, "in recognition of creative excellence in the art of animation." It also won an award from iParenting Media.

== Sequel ==
A sequel, Kung Fu Panda: Legendary Warriors, was released for the Wii and Nintendo DS in November 2008 and received mixed reviews.
