= Po (Kung Fu Panda) =

Title character and the protagonist of the Kung Fu Panda franchise

Ping Xiaopo The Dragon Warrior
- Kung Fu Panda character
- Po, as he appears in Kung Fu Panda
- First appearance: Kung Fu Panda (2008)
- Created by: Ethan Reiff; Cyrus Voris
- Voiced by: List: Jack Black (films, short films, and The Dragon Knight); Mick Wingert (Legends of Awesomeness, The Paws of Destiny, and video games); Liam Knight (baby; Kung Fu Panda 2); Eric Loomis (Legendary Warriors)

In-universe information
- Full name: Ping Xiaopo; Lotus Li (birth name)
- Species: Giant panda
- Gender: Male
- Title(s): Dragon Warrior/Dragon Master; Warrior of Black and White; Kung Fu Panda; Spiritual Leader of the Valley of Peace
- Occupation: Kung Fu Master; Champion of the Valley of Peace
- Fighting style: Zuiquan; Lóng Xíng Mó Qiáo
- Family: Mr. Ping (adoptive father); Li Shan (biological father); Unnamed biological mother (deceased); Unnamed adoptive grandfather; Unnamed adoptive great-grandfather; Dim and Sum (cousins)
- Nationality: Chinese

Po, full name Ping Xiaopo (Note: traditional Chinese: 平小寶; simplified Chinese: 平小宝; Mandarin (pinyin): Píng Xiǎobǎo; Hokkien (POJ): Pî Sió/Siáu Pó; Hakka (PFS): Phiàng/Phìn Séu Pó; Cantonese (jyutping): Ping⁴ Siu² Bou².) and born Lotus Li, is a fictional character and the title character and protagonist of the Kung Fu Panda franchise, which is produced by DreamWorks Animation. He is voiced by American actor Jack Black in the feature films and by Mick Wingert in related television shows and video games.

Po made his debut in Kung Fu Panda (2008) as an anthropomorphic giant panda who is chosen to become the prophesied Dragon Warrior, also known as the Dragon Master, as well as the Warrior of Black and White. Despite appearing to be unfit to become a kung fu master, Po becomes the unlikely student of Master Shifu and the team leader of the Furious Five, a quintet of skilled warriors, proving himself worthy of becoming a martial arts hero.

Po is the protagonist of three subsequent films; Kung Fu Panda 2 (2011), Kung Fu Panda 3 (2016) and Kung Fu Panda 4 (2024). He also appears in several short films, television series and video games. Critics have responded positively to the character and praised Jack Black's vocal performance.

== Voice ==
Po is voiced in the films by American actor, Jack Black. Before taking on the role of Po, he had previously voiced two animated characters: Zeke in Ice Age (2002) and Lenny in Shark Tale (2004). He was drawn to the part by DreamWorks co-founder Jeffrey Katzenberg who told him to be himself rather than create a character. Black was convinced after viewing a short animation created for audio from one of his earlier films. He was pleased to play a superhero using his "natural instincts". When in the recording studio, Black was very physical while voicing the character, often performing kung fu moves and using extreme facial movements to help his performance. Po is also voiced by American voice actor Mick Wingert in various media in the franchise, including the 2011 television show Kung Fu Panda: Legends of Awesomeness, the 2018 television show Kung Fu Panda: The Paws of Destiny, and related video games, such as DreamWorks All-Star Kart Racing.

== Characteristics ==
Po is a rotund giant panda whose dream is to become a martial artist. His lofty ambitions are contradicted by his real-life circumstances, as he must regularly help his father to serve noodles in his restaurant. Such is his enthusiasm for kung fu, he idolizes his heroes, Tigress, Monkey, Crane, Mantis and Viper, a group of five kung fu masters trained by Master Shifu. Po's dreams of being a kung fu master clash with his personal laziness and slovenliness. He is so unfit that he struggles to climb the steps that lead to the temple in the mountains. Black described Po as a "nerdy kid" who has a childlike obsession with kung fu, as he keeps action figures of the masters and has a knowledge of the mythology.

== Appearances ==
=== Feature films ===
==== Kung Fu Panda (2008) ====
In the first film, Po (Jack Black) is dubbed as the Dragon Warrior by Master Oogway (Randall Duk Kim), much to the protest of Po and his fellow masters. During his training, Master Shifu (Dustin Hoffman) and the Furious Five make no secret of their disdain for Po, assigning him rough physical activities in the hope of discouraging him. Po endures the abuse without complaint, which impresses most of the Furious Five. Shifu uses Po's love of food in a custom training regimen, which demonstrates Po's skill in combat. Now convinced of Po's worthiness, Shifu presents the legendary Dragon Scroll to Po, only to find that it is just a blank reflective surface. Shifu and the team learn that the snow leopard Tai Lung (Ian McShane) has escaped from Chorh-Gom Prison. In despair, Shifu orders Po and the Furious Five to help the villagers escape while Shifu buys some time by engaging Tai Lung in a fight to the death. Po learns from his adoptive father, Mr. Ping (James Hong), that the secret ingredient of his "Secret Ingredient Soup" is nothing; instead, people only had to believe it was special. With this advice, Po realizes that the scroll's true empowering symbolic value is that with enough dedication, someone can make the best version of themselves. Encouraged, Po challenges Tai Lung in a climactic battle and defeats him with an improvised combat style, using his body fat as a shield. Amazed by his new talent, the Furious Five finally acknowledge Po as a true kung fu master.

==== Kung Fu Panda 2 (2011) ====
In the second film, the villainous peacock Lord Shen's (Gary Oldman) wolf forces perform a raid looking for refined metal to use in Shen's cannons. The attempt of Po (Jack Black) and the Furious Five to stop the raid is thwarted by seeing the fealty symbol on the Boss Wolf (Danny McBride), which gives Po a traumatic childhood flashback of the attack on his village. He discovers that Mr. Ping (James Hong), a Chinese goose, is not his birth father, but adopted him. When Po is sent with the Five on a mission to stop Lord Shen's attempt to conquer China, he is plagued with dreams about his parents replacing him with a radish. He is reluctant to talk about them, even to Tigress (Angelina Jolie), who becomes Po's confidant. Po is still hampered with paralyzing flashbacks, especially at the sight of the symbol on Lord Shen's plumage, which causes him to question Shen. Po survives Shen's cannon attacks and is rescued by the elderly Soothsayer (Michelle Yeoh), who heals Po's body with acupuncture and medicinal brew. Po, now able to recall all his memories of being orphaned, finds inner peace in light of recalling the happy and fulfilling life with his loved ones in the Valley of Peace. By achieving tranquility, Po defeats Lord Shen's fleet by grabbing the fired projectiles and returning them to destroy their launchers. Po saves China while cementing his reputation as one of the mightiest warriors. Afterward, Po returns to his adoptive father, Mr. Ping, and tells him that he is, in fact, his dad for having adopted him. He is unaware that his biological father, Li (Fred Tatasciore), is still alive, living in a panda hideout with other villagers.

==== Kung Fu Panda 3 (2016) ====
In the third film, Po (Jack Black) is promoted to teacher when Shifu (Dustin Hoffman) decides to retire. His attempt to train the Furious Five ends disastrously, so he visits Shifu for advice, who reveals that he set Po up to fail to teach him a lesson. The arrival of Li Shan (Bryan Cranston), Po's biological father, causes Mr. Ping's jealousy. Shortly after bringing his father to the Jade Palace, the Valley of Peace is attacked by jade kung fu masters. Po learns that they were sent by General Kai (J.K. Simmons), a ferocious warrior bull who was once Master Oogway's ally. Po decides to learn the power of chi from the inhabitants of the panda village and upon arriving at the village, learns to live like a panda. Po learns from Tigress that Kai has taken the chi of all the kung fu masters, including Shifu, Crane, Mantis, Viper, and Monkey and destroyed the Jade Palace. When Po demands to be taught how to use chi. Li admits that he lied about knowing how to use chi to bring his son home. Hurt by his deception, Po isolates himself and trains rigorously to fight Kai, with his self-doubt returning. Po then trains the village to use kung fu. When Kai attacks the village with his jade army, Po's unorthodox forces and tactics initially gain the upper hand. However, Kai overpowers Po and prepares to take his chi. Po grabs Kai and sends them both to the Spirit Realm, where they battle again. Li, Tigress, Mr. Ping and the other pandas use their chi to save Po, causing him to generate a dragon-shaped chi avatar to defeat Kai. In the aftermath of the battle, Oogway appears to Po and reveals that he chose Po as the Dragon Warrior because he is a descendant of the ancient pandas who helped him centuries ago and that Po is the physical embodiment of the Yin and Yang, the rightful successor. Oogway presents him with a mystical jade staff. Upon returning to the Mortal Realm, Po reunites with his family and friends and instructs the pandas, the kung fu masters and the Valley of Peace residents in spreading chi across the land.

==== Kung Fu Panda 4 (2024) ====
In the fourth film, Po is set to become the Spiritual Leader of the Valley of Peace. In doing so, he must step down as the Dragon Warrior and find his successor. On his journey, he teams up with a fox bandit named Zhen, to defeat The Chameleon, an evil sorceress that can take the form of villains from his past, after his Staff of Wisdom. He later appoints Zhen as his successor.

=== Short films ===
==== Secrets of the Furious Five (2008) ====
Po (Jack Black) has also improved his physical health when he runs alongside Shifu (Dustin Hoffman) at an amazing pace and upon stopping, needs much less time than before to catch his breath. Shifu then assigns him to teach an introduction to kung fu to a group of rabbit children, to whom Po tries to explain the true meaning of kung fu, illustrating his point with the stories of the Furious Five's pasts.

==== Kung Fu Panda Holiday Special (2010) ====
Master Po (Jack Black) is appointed as the host of the kung fu masters' Winter Feast at the Jade Palace. Although Po successfully makes the arrangements with considerable difficulty, he decides being with his father for the holiday is more important and joins him at the restaurant. However, all the masters, deeply moved by Po's loyalty, come as well. After this episode, Po moved out to focus on his duties as the Dragon Warrior to reassure that his father is at peace with his calling.

==== Kung Fu Panda: Secrets of the Masters (2011) ====
Under the pretense of an emergency in the dead of night, Master Po leads Master Tigress (Angelina Jolie) and Master Mantis (Seth Rogen) into breaking into the new Masters' Council exhibit in tribute to Masters Thundering Rhino (Paul Scheer), Ox (Dennis Haysbert) and Croc (Tony Leondis). Even though Tigress and Mantis are annoyed at the deception, Po engages their interest in the story of how the trio of masters first met.

==== Kung Fu Panda: Secrets of the Scroll (2015) ====
As Po (Jack Black) grew into his teenage years, he developed a lack of focus and of his father's skill in cooking, which later led to Shifu (Dustin Hoffman) getting food poisoning after Po prepared a meal for the Jade Palace while his father was away on business. Afterward, Po began to consider other possible career paths, such as a cleaner, comedian, dancer or doctor and made a list of them on a scroll. This scroll later inadvertently ended up in Tigress's hands (Kari Wahlgren), who mistook it for a list made by Shifu of four warriors she was to gather to face the villainous Boar. This led to her recruiting Crane (David Cross), Monkey (James Sie), Viper (Lucy Liu) and Mantis (Seth Rogen), who was quickly dismissed by Shifu, who also ordered the evacuation of the valley.

During this time, Po revealed to his father that he had caused Shifu's illness, which his father took as good publicity, and was then sent to gather ingredients for meals to be served to the fleeing villagers. From the hilltop his father had specified, Po then watched as the future Furious Five battled Boar and quickly determined what he wanted to do with his life: practice kung fu. He later made a set of Furious Five action figures, which he treasured for years.

=== Television series ===
==== Kung Fu Panda: Legends of Awesomeness (2012–16) ====
In Kung Fu Panda: Legends of Awesomeness, Po (Mick Wingert) and Monkey (James Sie) are best friends in "Scorpion's Sting". Monkey's mind-controlled to kill Po by Scorpion, but the panda reminds him that they're friends and when that doesn't work, Po then hits him. In "Chain Reaction", Po said that he would like to be friends with Tigress (Kari Wahlgren); he tells her that he "dreamed" of being friends with her since he was five and later, when she goes off on him, he says that she "stinks at the friendship and fun ship." In "Bad Po", it is revealed that Po has a split personality: one is kind, considerate, caring, polite, sensitive, very positive, helpful, hard-working, selfless and compassionate (which makes him "Good Po") and the other one is rude, very negative, lazy, sadistic, unhelpful, heartless, abusive, mean-spirited, selfish, manipulative, mischievous, cruel, uncaring, destructive, misbehaved and devious (which makes him "Bad Po" or "Evil Po"). Both of his personalities have been split when he gets infected by the Mystical Mirror of Yin and Yang. Bad Po blames Good Po for his evil deeds and when one panda gets hurt, the other feels the same. In the end, Good Po makes Bad Po look in the mirror and both pandas are rejoined.

==== Kung Fu Panda: The Paws of Destiny (2018–19) ====
After fulfilling his true destiny as a Dragon Warrior of the prophecy thanks to his learning of his ancestral bloodline, Po (Mick Wingert) is now a mentor of four panda kids (Nu Hai, Jing, Bao and Fan Tong), who stumbled upon a mythical cave within Panda Village and being chosen by the spirits of Four Constellations, their legendary chi respectively.

==== Kung Fu Panda: The Dragon Knight (2022–23) ====
Po (Jack Black) leaves China to find four elemental weapons with the English knight Sir Luthera (Rita Ora) and are aided in their journey by Po's adoptive father Mr. Ping (James Hong) and Rukhmini (Rahnuma Panthaky).

=== Video games ===
Actor Mick Wingert voices Po in all of the Kung Fu Panda video games except for Legendary Warriors, in which he is voiced by Eric Loomis.

- Kung Fu Panda: The Game (2008 June) is a video game loosely based on the first film, released by Activision for Microsoft Windows and Xbox 360; Nintendo DS and Wii; and Sony PlayStation 2 and PlayStation 3.
- Kung Fu Panda: Legendary Warriors (2008 November–December) is a sequel to the first Kung Fu Panda game. It was published by Activision on November 5 and December 5, 2008 for the Nintendo DS and Wii, respectively. Po is voiced by Eric Loomis.
- Kung Fu Panda World (2010 April 12) is a virtual world online game.
- Kung Fu Panda 2 (2011 May 23) is a video game that takes place after the events of the second film. It was developed and published by THQ for Nintendo DS, Wii, PlayStation 3 and Xbox 360.
- Kung Fu Panda: Showdown of Legendary Legends (2015 December 1) is a fighting game developed by Vicious Cycle Software and published by Little Orbit for Microsoft Windows, Xbox 360 and Xbox One; Nintendo 3DS and Wii U; and Sony's PlayStation 3 and PlayStation 4.

== Reception ==
Po received a positive response from Allan Hunter of Screen Daily, who commented that Black was perfectly cast in the role and praised his voice acting as a "blustering, frantic delight". A Time Out review described Po as a "winning hero", highlighting his silly and offbeat character, and Kirk Honeycutt of The Hollywood Reporter said that using such an odd and clumsy hero for a kung-fu movie was a "stroke of genius". Roger Ebert was less enthusiastic, commenting that Po's dumpling battle with his teacher "upstag[ed] everything" but the character was generally predictable and lacking in charisma. Writing for The New York Times, Manohla Dargis broadly agreed, saying she was pleased by Black's restrained vocals but noting that Po is consistent with other animated heroes, being an outsider and a character with a dream who undertakes a journey supported by his friends. In an IGN review of the second film, Matt Fowler opined that Po was one of Black's most likeable roles alongside School of Rock. Roger Ebert was pleased that the second film explained Po's parentage due to Mr. Ping being a goose and, unlike the review from the first movie, praised the personality in Black's vocals.

In China, there were some calls to boycott the film as cultural appropriation, using Chinese pandas and culture to profit foreign companies. It was nonetheless approved by Chinese censors and, upon release, instead became a box office and critical success, leading to introspective self-criticism about why China had not itself already produced something comparable. "'Besides borrowing a number of sequences from classic kung fu movies in China, the animated comedy grasped the essence of our culture,' Lu Chuan, a young Chinese movie director, wrote in a much noted commentary in China Daily."
