= Kung Fu Panda 4 =

2024 DreamWorks Animation film

- Theatrical release poster
- Directed by: Mike Mitchell
- Written by: Jonathan Aibel; Glenn Berger; Darren Lemke
- Produced by: Rebecca Huntley
- Starring: Jack Black
- Cinematography: Joshua Gunther
- Edited by: Christopher Knights
- Music by: Hans Zimmer; Steve Mazzaro
- Production company: DreamWorks Animation
- Distributed by: Universal Pictures
- Release dates: March 3, 2024 (The Grove); March 8, 2024 (United States)
- Running time: 94 minutes
- Country: United States
- Language: English
- Budget: $85 million
- Box office: $547.7 million

Kung Fu Panda 4 is a 2024 American animated martial arts comedy film directed by Mike Mitchell and written by Darren Lemke, Jonathan Aibel and Glenn Berger. Produced by DreamWorks Animation, it is the fourth installment in the Kung Fu Panda franchise and the sequel to Kung Fu Panda 3 (2016). It features Jack Black, Bryan Cranston, James Hong, Ian McShane, and Dustin Hoffman reprising their roles from the previous films. In the film, Po—who must find and train his successor as the new Dragon Warrior—teams up with fox bandit Zhen to defeat evil sorceress The Chameleon, who plans to steal the kung fu skills of every deceased master in China.

DreamWorks announced the fourth film in August 2022, with Mitchell, Stephanie Ma Stine, and Rebecca Huntley attached as director, co-director, and producer, respectively, by April 2023. In December 2023, most of the main voice cast, along with the return of Aibel and Berger as writers and co-producers, were confirmed. Lemke's involvement was confirmed in February 2024. Composer Hans Zimmer, who had scored for the previous three installments, returned as composer alongside frequent collaborator Steve Mazzaro.

Kung Fu Panda 4 premiered at the AMC 14 Theater at The Grove in Los Angeles on March 3, 2024, and was theatrically released in the United States on March 8 by Universal Pictures. The film received mostly positive reviews from critics and proved commercially successful, grossing $547.7 million worldwide on an $85 million budget and outgrossing its predecessor to rank as the ninth-highest-grossing film of 2024. It earned three nominations at the 52nd Annie Awards, as well as a nomination for Best Animated Feature at the 52nd Saturn Awards.

== Plot ==
Several years after the events of the third film, while Po helps his fathers—Li Shan and Mr. Ping—open their new restaurant, Master Shifu tells him that he must advance and become the Spiritual Leader of the Valley of Peace. This means Po can no longer be the Dragon Warrior and must find a suitable successor to take his place. However, Po struggles to choose the right candidate as he does not want to lose his status.

Meanwhile, he stumbles upon a corsac fox bandit named Zhen trying to steal ancient weapons from the Jade Palace. Po outsmarts Zhen and sends her to prison, but a group of mine workers tells him that Tai Lung has returned from the Spirit Realm and destroyed an entire quarry. Zhen reveals that Tai Lung's return was masqueraded by a sorceress known as The Chameleon, who can shape-shift into any animal she wants as well as copying various kung fu skills simply by touching them.

Po and Zhen join forces and travel to Juniper City to take down the Chameleon, unaware that Po’s fathers, worried that he will not stand a chance against her, are following them. After visiting a shifty tavern and fighting off the patrons, Po and Zhen soon arrive at Juniper City and are almost arrested, but they are able to escape thanks to the Den of Thieves, where they receive aid from Han, the den's pangolin leader and Zhen's old mentor. From there, Po and Zhen head to the Chameleon's lair until Po is captured. It is then revealed that Zhen has been acting as a double agent for the Chameleon, and was tasked to acquire Po's Staff of Wisdom, (Note: Obtained by Po from Master Oogway at the end of Kung Fu Panda 3 (2016).) which has the power to access the Spirit Realm. Po almost manages to escape, but the Chameleon, taking Zhen's form, fools him and throws him off a cliff, much to Zhen's horror. He nearly falls to his death but is rescued by the timely arrival of his fathers, who convince him that sometimes change can be good.

Using the Staff of Wisdom, the Chameleon summons every deceased kung fu master and steals their skills, including three of Po's past enemies; the real Tai Lung, Lord Shen, and General Kai. (Note: The respective antagonists of Kung Fu Panda (2008), Kung Fu Panda 2 (2011), and Kung Fu Panda 3 (2016).) After defecting for good, the guilt-stricken Zhen reunites with Po and apologizes for betraying him, but he refuses to back down from facing the Chameleon, so Zhen, Mr. Ping and Li head back to the Den of Thieves to convince them to help them save Po. As they battle The Chameleon's army of Komodo dragons, Po tries to reason with the Chameleon to no avail, although she does give the Staff of Wisdom back to him as she no longer needs it. They battle one-on-one, but when Zhen intervenes, the Chameleon turns into a Chimera made up of several kung fu masters, Lord Shen and General Kai. Eventually, she shifts into Po himself and fights him, and quickly traps him in a cage. Putting his trust in Zhen, Po gives her the Staff of Wisdom, with which she bests the Chameleon. Po, who was only pretending to be trapped, defeats the Chameleon and returns all of the stolen kung fu to their owners, who show respect to Po and return to the Spirit Realm, with Tai Lung finally acknowledging Po as the Dragon Warrior and forcibly taking the Chameleon with him.

While returning to the Valley of Peace, Po chooses Zhen as his successor, much to Shifu's dismay, and trains her to become the next Dragon Warrior, becoming confident with his choice.

== Voice cast ==
- Jack Black as Po, a giant panda who is set to become a Spiritual Leader after renouncing his title as the Dragon Warrior
- Awkwafina as Zhen, a corsac fox and a wanted thief from Juniper City who accompanies Po on his journey to stop The Chameleon
  - Awkwafina also voices The Chameleon's form of Zhen.
- Viola Davis as The Chameleon, a nefarious shape-shifting chameleon sorceress that can copy others' kung fu by absorbing their abilities
  - Tom McGrath voices a crocodile that The Chameleon poses as while meeting with the heads of Juniper City's crime families.
- Dustin Hoffman as Master Shifu, a wise red panda and Po's master
- James Hong as Mr. Ping, a Chinese goose and Po's adoptive father
- Bryan Cranston as Li Shan, Po's biological father
- Ian McShane as Tai Lung, a villainous snow leopard who was Shifu's adopted son and former disciple
  - McShane also voices The Chameleon's form of Tai Lung in the film's opening scene.
- Ke Huy Quan as Han, a Sunda pangolin who is the leader of a den of thieves
- Lori Tan Chinn as Granny Boar, an elderly female boar who can take out her tusks and use them as weapons
- Ronny Chieng as Captain Fish, a green arowana that lives in a pelican's mouth, who is his seemingly adoptive mother
- Gedde Watanabe as the badger crime boss that meets with The Chameleon in Juniper City
- Karen Maruyama as the wolf crime boss that meets with The Chameleon in Juniper City
- Harry Shum Jr. as Scott, a fire-breathing crocodile who was sent to the Spirit Realm by Po

Additionally, the Furious Five is featured in a non-speaking appearance in the end credits, excluding Seth Rogen providing screams for Mantis. Lord Shen and General Kai also have non-speaking appearances when The Chameleon is summoning villains from the Spirit Realm, including a clique of past Kung-Fu masters. YouTuber Jimmy "MrBeast" Donaldson has a cameo appearance as Panda Pig, a pig painted black-and-white who is one of the five candidates for the next Dragon Warrior.

== Production ==
=== Development ===
On December 3, 2010, then-DreamWorks Animation CEO Jeffrey Katzenberg said that there was a possibility the series could have three more sequels after Kung Fu Panda 3, bringing it to a six-film series. On January 13, 2016, Collider asked the filmmakers of Kung Fu Panda 3 about the possibility of a fourth film. Co-director Jennifer Yuh Nelson stated, "It's one at a time. We want to make this a perfect jewel, and then we'll see what happens after that". Co-director Alessandro Carloni said, "With the sequels, we don't want to try to have them feel open-ended. We want it to feel like a completed journey, and we feel this movie does. And then, if a fantastic story presents itself, great". On August 2, 2018, when asked about the possibility of Kung Fu Panda 4, Nelson replied that she always saw the series as a trilogy, but was open to a fourth installment as long as the franchise focused on Po.

In August 2022, DreamWorks Animation confirmed that Kung Fu Panda 4 was in production. At CinemaCon in April 2023, more details for the film were revealed, such as the premise as described by Jack Black. It was also announced that Mike Mitchell, the director of Shrek Forever After and Trolls, was set to direct the film, with Stephanie Ma Stine co-directing and Rebecca Huntley producing. Mitchell was a creative consultant on the first film and an executive producer on the third film. The film was originally planned to be a live-action/animated hybrid, according to Ma Stine. Characters such as The Chameleon (known as The Collector) and Zhen would have been humans. This would all eventually be scrapped.

=== Writing ===
By December 2023, it was reported that Jonathan Aibel and Glenn Berger returned to write the screenplay. In February 2024, Darren Lemke was revealed to have co-written the screenplay. Mitchell described Kung Fu Panda 4 as a love letter to the first film. Despite its connections to previous entries in the series, he wanted the story to stand on its own. When producing the third film, Mitchell felt that Po's character development from the first film was wrapping up due to finally becoming the Dragon Warrior, so he wondered what if another sequel took "all that" away, leading the filmmakers to find some "really great heavy themes" that they felt are important for the modern world. Mitchell aimed to evolve Po, introduce new characters, and expand the film's world. He attributed the long production time to the search for a perfect story that would truly advance Po's character. He described Po as having a black-and-white view of the world and wanted to pair him with a more morally grey character, Zhen. Mitchell also wanted a character who Po can be frustrated by, like how Shifu gets frustrated by him.

For The Chameleon, Mitchell sought to make her a more-brain-than-brawn kind of villain. He went on to say that she is the smartest and most supernatural foe Po has faced. He described The Chameleon as a mirror to Po in that both characters were underestimated by society for their bodies, but went on to gain high status. He said, "So Po has become the greatest hero, and now she's the greatest villain". Mitchell felt that one of the things the Kung Fu Panda franchise stands out for, aside from Black's Po, are its villains, so he made sure that The Chameleon could be as formidable as Tai Lung, Lord Shen and General Kai, hence his reasoning to specifically bring the former back into this sequel's story. Lord Shen, Kai, and the Furious Five were added to the film at the last minute.

=== Casting ===
In May 2023, it was reported that Awkwafina had joined the voice cast of the film. In December 2023, it was announced that Ke Huy Quan and Viola Davis would join the cast, with the latter playing the villain of the film, The Chameleon. Lori Tan Chinn and Ronny Chieng were also announced as new cast members, with Ian McShane, Bryan Cranston, James Hong, and Dustin Hoffman reprising their roles from the previous films. Mitchell stated that he is a fan of McShane's work and that it was a "blast" to be able to work with him; had McShane refused to reprise his role as Tai Lung, there was no alternate plan for the film's story, as filmmakers had "locked in" for Tai Lung's return.

In December 2023, Mitchell stated that Masters Tigress, Monkey, Crane, Mantis, and Viper—known collectively as the Furious Five—would make an appearance in the film and that they are "off on their own individual missions", with producer Rebecca Huntley confirming that there would be "a glimpse of the Furious Five". In a March 2024 Discord Q&A session in a fan server, co-director Stephanie Ma Stine noted that the Furious Five were not originally going to appear despite protests from writers, artists, and animators. She explained that it was due to the costs of the original actors, especially Angelina Jolie as Tigress. However, the marketing department told the filmmakers to include them in a cameo appearance. Ma Stine also expressed interest in having SungWon Cho be part of the film.

=== Animation and design ===
Mitchell stated that the film's fight scenes reflect advances in both technology and kung fu, and took more influence from anime than previous films in the series. Stunt performers from Marvel films joined production to give the animators moves to study and use in the choreography. The Chameleon was DreamWorks' most complex character to animate, with a total of 8,130 controls. While most of the animation for the film was provided by DreamWorks Animation Glendale, Jellyfish Pictures—who previously worked with DreamWorks on How to Train Your Dragon: Homecoming, Spirit Untamed, The Boss Baby: Family Business, and The Bad Guys—handled the additional asset production services using proprietary software like Premo and Moonray.

Kung Fu Panda 4 and The Wild Robot were the last two films to be made entirely in-house at DreamWorks Animation, as Cartoon Brew reported on October 6, 2023, that the studio would be moving away from producing films in-house in their Glendale campus to rely more heavily on outside studios after 2024.

=== Music ===
In December 2023, Hans Zimmer and Steve Mazzaro, the former of whom also composed for the first three films, were announced to compose the film's score. A cover of Britney Spears' "...Baby One More Time" by Tenacious D is featured in the end credits. The album was released on March 8, 2024, simultaneously with the film's release, by Back Lot Music.

== Marketing ==
Po returned to the Macy's Thanksgiving Day Parade in November 2023 as promotion for the film. The trailer for the film, featuring The White Stripes' "Seven Nation Army", along with a poster, was released on December 13, 2023. The trailer was viewed over 142 million times in the first 24 hours across all social media, becoming the most-viewed trailer for a Universal animated film, surpassing Illumination's The Super Mario Bros. Movie, Minions: The Rise of Gru, and Sing 2, as well as DreamWorks' own Puss in Boots: The Last Wish.

== Release ==
=== Theatrical ===
Kung Fu Panda 4 premiered at the AMC 14 Theater at The Grove in Los Angeles on March 3, 2024, and was released in the United States on March 8, with showtimes a day prior. The film was shown at the Columbia University School of the Arts on March 1, 2024.

=== Home media ===
Universal Pictures Home Entertainment released Kung Fu Panda 4 for digital download on April 9, 2024, and on 4K Ultra HD Blu-ray, Blu-ray, and DVD on May 28. Physical copies contain an audio commentary, behind-the-scenes featurettes, deleted scenes, recreational activities, and a short film titled Dueling Dumplings.

The film was made available to stream on NBCUniversal's Peacock streaming service in the United States on June 21, 2024. As part of an 18-month deal with Netflix for Universal's animated films, the film streamed on Peacock for the first four months of the pay-TV window, before moving to Netflix for the next ten months beginning on October 21, and returning to Peacock for the remaining four months beginning on August 21, 2025.

== Reception ==
=== Box office ===
Kung Fu Panda 4 grossed $193.6 million in the United States and Canada and $354.1 million in other territories, for a worldwide total of $547.7 million. Deadline Hollywood calculated the film's net profit as $178 million, accounting for production budgets, marketing, talent participations and other costs; box office grosses, television and streaming, and home media revenues, making Kung Fu Panda 4 the eighth-most profitable blockbuster of 2024.

In the United States and Canada, Kung Fu Panda 4 was released alongside Imaginary and Cabrini, and was projected to gross $45–50 million from 3,900 theaters in its opening weekend. The film made $19.4 million on its first day, including $3.8 million from Thursday night previews. It went on to debut to $58 million, topping the box office and becoming the highest opening weekend for a DreamWorks Animation film since Madagascar 3: Europe's Most Wanted in 2012. The film made $30.1 million in its second weekend (a drop of 48%), remaining in first. It made $16.5 million in its third weekend, finishing in third behind newcomer Ghostbusters: Frozen Empire and Dune: Part Two. Kung Fu Panda 4 completed its domestic theatrical run on June 6, 2024.

=== Critical response ===
On the review aggregator website Rotten Tomatoes, 71% of 165 critics' reviews are positive, with an average rating of 6.1/10. The website's consensus reads: "Kung Fu Panda 4 offers enough eye-catching entertainment to sustain the franchise's young fans, although it's starting to feel like this series is running out of steam." Metacritic, which uses a weighted average, assigned the film a score of 54 out of 100, based on 33 critics, indicating "mixed or average" reviews. Audiences polled by CinemaScore gave the film an average grade of "A−" on an A+ to F scale (the same as the first film), while those polled by PostTrak gave it an 80% overall positive score, with 59% saying they would recommend it.

Frank Scheck of The Hollywood Reporter wrote, "With its new settings and characters, including Oscar winner Ke Huy Quan as a pangolin leader of a den of thieves and Ronny Chieng as a fish that lives in a pelican's mouth, Kung Fu Panda 4 clearly aims to refresh the franchise. But it's really more of the same, which is not such a bad thing when you consider that the series has grossed some $1.8 billion so far (and that's not including the spin-off projects, including various television series and video games). Its appeal still lies largely in Black's hilarious vocal performance which has lost none of its charm." Emma Stefansky of IGN gave it a positive score of 7 out of 10, stating while the Furious Five are absent, "Kung Fu Panda 4 gives martial arts panda Po a new friend, a new adversary, and a new job, while keeping the stylized animation and exciting fight scenes that make this series a delight". Wilson Chapman of IndieWire gave the film a B− and wrote: "Black can, at this point, play this role in his sleep, but he still gives it his all in his fourth go around, and his pitch perfect comic timing and lovable earnestness makes the journey an easy one to take."

For The New York Times, Claire Shaffer complimented the film's art direction and Black and Awkwafina's chemistry; overall, she felt it "is an enjoyable Kung Fu Panda movie, even if it's missing some of the pizazz of the earlier ones." A review in Le Devoir took notice of the reduced production budget, writing "the images are less spectacular" and it brought "the franchise back to the essence of the art of cartoon (but by computer all the same), its Disneyesque characters, and the settings, still rich in depth and color, of the Valley of Peace, this fantastic reproduction of Ancient China." DiscussingFilm gave it 4 stars out of 5 and wrote "Kung Fu Panda 4 is not a sequel many thought we needed but one we'll be happy that it exists. It features the best action DreamWorks has ever created and the story pushes Jack Black's Po in an exciting direction".

Owen Gleiberman of Variety unfavorably compared the film to its predecessors, writing, "Even after 16 years of Po, you want to hear Jack Black's voice charged with that youthful cockeyed exuberance, rather than the older-and-wiser aura he exudes here. You also wish the movie had better jokes. Mitchell, co-directing with Stephanie Stine, doesn't stage the action bouts with the surreal freedom that animation makes possible. Po goes through the motions, but I'm sorry, the kick is gone." Similarly, The Boston Globe's Odie Henderson expressed disappointment with the film's villain and action sequences, concluding "I enjoyed the first three adventures of the Dragon Warrior, but the best thing he can do now is to give this series a much needed skadoosh, sending it to rest in the cinematic spirit realm."

Christy Lemire, in her review for RogerEbert.com, wrote Kung Fu Panda 4 "struggles to justify its existence. It lacks both the delicate artistry and warm wit of its predecessors. The subtle sense of spirituality is long gone; in its place are frantic action sequences." In a mixed review for the Los Angeles Times, Katie Walsh stated: "Though visually dazzling, Kung Fu Panda 4 shows a flabby franchise in need of punch."

=== Accolades ===
Award	Date of ceremony	Category	Recipient(s)	Result	Ref.
Annie Awards	February 8, 2025	Best Animated Feature	Kung Fu Panda 4	Nominated	
Annie Awards	February 8, 2025	Outstanding Achievement for Animated Effects in an Animated Production	Zachary Glynn, Alex Timchenko, Kiem Ching Ong, Yorie Kaela Kumalasari and Jinguang Huang	Nominated	
Annie Awards	February 8, 2025	Outstanding Achievement for Character Animation in an Animated Feature Production	Patrick Guisiano	Nominated	
NAACP Image Awards	February 22, 2025	Outstanding Animated Motion Picture	Kung Fu Panda 4	Nominated	
Nickelodeon Kids' Choice Awards	July 13, 2024	Favorite Animated Movie	Kung Fu Panda 4	Nominated	
Nickelodeon Kids' Choice Awards	July 13, 2024	Favorite Male Voice from an Animated Movie	Jack Black	Nominated	
Nickelodeon Kids' Choice Awards	July 13, 2024	Favorite Female Voice from an Animated Movie	Awkwafina	Nominated	
Saturn Awards	February 2, 2025	Best Animated Film	Kung Fu Panda 4	Nominated	
Visual Effects Society Awards	February 11, 2025	Outstanding Created Environment in an Animated Feature	"Juniper City" – Benjamin Lippert, Ryan Prestridge, Sarah Vawter and Peter Maynez	Nominated	
Visual Effects Society Awards	February 11, 2025	Outstanding Effects Simulations in an Animated Feature	Jinguang Huang, Zhao Wang, Hamid Shahsavari and Joshua LaBrot	Nominated	

== Future ==
In May 2024, following the commercial success of Kung Fu Panda 4, Mitchell suggested that a fifth film could happen, but it would likely not be until at least 2027 due to the lengthy production process.
