= List of Kung Fu Panda characters =

List of characters from the Kung Fu Panda media franchise

The following is a list of characters from the DreamWorks animated film media franchise Kung Fu Panda. The franchise includes four films (Kung Fu Panda, Kung Fu Panda 2, Kung Fu Panda 3, and Kung Fu Panda 4), a series of shorts and television specials, three television shows (Kung Fu Panda: Legends of Awesomeness, Kung Fu Panda: The Paws of Destiny and Kung Fu Panda: The Dragon Knight), a series of digital comics, and multiple video games.

== Protagonists ==
=== Po ===
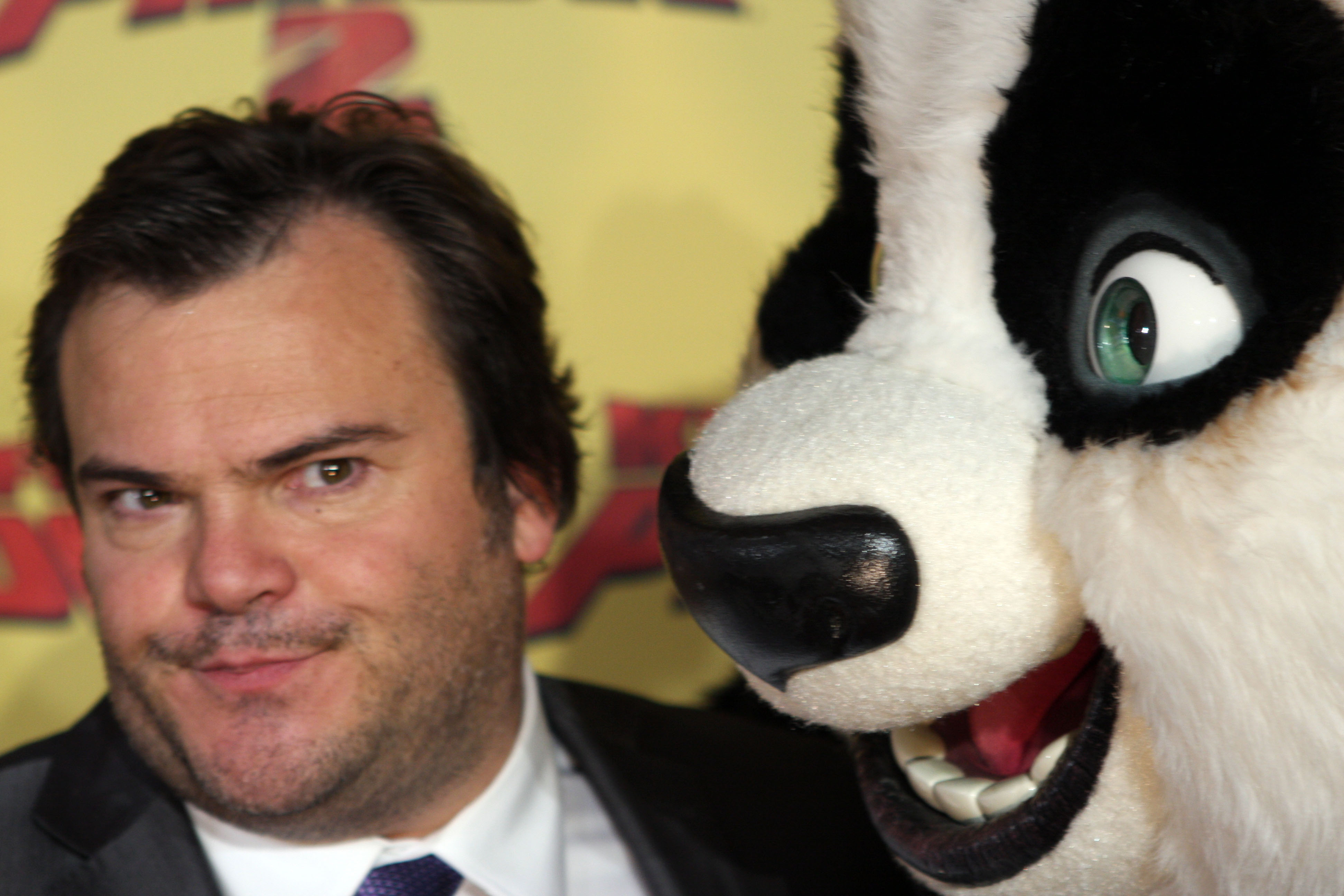
Jack Black serves as the voice actor for Po in the Kung Fu Panda movies.

Master Ping Xiao Po (Birth name: Lotus) (voiced by Jack Black in the films, TV specials and The Dragon Knight, by Mick Wingert in TV series, and by Eric Loomis in the games) is the main protagonist of the Kung Fu Panda franchise. A kung fu fan and giant panda working at his adoptive father's noodle restaurant, Po is chosen by Grand Master Oogway as the legendary Dragon Warrior, a decision that angers Shifu and the Furious Five. When Tai Lung escapes from prison, Shifu uses food to motivate Po into mastering kung fu. He battles Tai Lung in combat, defeats him using the legendary Wuxi Finger Hold technique, and is declared a master.

In Kung Fu Panda 2, Po learns that he was adopted by Ping as a baby (voiced by Liam Knight) after Lord Shen committed a massacre against the giant pandas. The end of the film reveals that Po's biological father Li Shan is still alive, and he reunites with his son in Kung Fu Panda 3. When the undead warrior General Kai steals the chi of the other kung fu masters, Po and Li create an army from the remaining giant pandas. After defeating Kai, Po has a spiritual reunion with Oogway, who informs Po that his journey as the Dragon Warrior has come full circle. He returns to the mortal world with his extended family. Kung Fu Panda 4 sees Po having to choose a new Dragon Warrior to take his place, as he is to ascend to his new spot as the Spiritual Leader of the Valley of Peace. Po struggles with the choice, as he is afraid of giving the Dragon Warrior title away. On his quest to defeat the Chameleon, Po befriends a thief named Zhen, who initially works for the Chameleon, but her friendship with Po causes her to defect. Seeing her change her ways inspires Po to finally accept that things change, and in the end he accepts his new post, and chooses Zhen as his successor.

Kung Fu Panda: Legends of Awesomeness, which occurs between the first and second film, shows Po's greater development as a kung fu warrior and master after defeating Tai Lung, while the follow-up series, Kung Fu Panda: The Paws of Destiny, takes place after the events of the third film and shows Po in a mentor role to four young pandas. Kung Fu Panda: The Dragon Knight, also takes place after the events of the third film and before the fourth film, shows Po in a journey to protect four legendary and powerful weapons from two English weasel magicians who intend to use them to take over the world. Po also appears in all short films and specials, as well as the video games.

=== Shifu ===
Master Shifu (voiced by Dustin Hoffman in the films and TV specials, and Fred Tatasciore in the TV series and video games) is a red panda, the headmaster of the Jade Palace, and the trainer of the Furious Five. He joined the palace when his father, the con artist Shirong, abandoned him there. Later in life, Shifu adopted Tai Lung, and he did not acknowledge his own role in the snow leopard's turn to evil until after Po was deemed the Dragon Warrior. Although Shifu initially doubts Po's potential in kung fu, he later trains Po to help him defeat Tai Lung and become a kung fu master.

After Tai Lung's defeat, Shifu becomes a more relaxed master to Po and the Five. By the time of the third film, he has retired from active teaching in order to focus on learning how to use chi, and he passes on the instructor mantle to Po. When Kai attacks the Jade Palace, Shifu is turned into a jade soldier and a member of Kai's army, but he is returned to normal when Po destroys Kai in the Spirit Realm. In the fourth film, Shifu tells Po that he will become the spiritual leader of the Valley of Peace. In the ending, he helps Po and the Furious Five train Zhen for the next Dragon Warrior, despite his reservations about her past.

=== Furious Five ===
From left to right: Viper, Crane, Mantis, Monkey, and Tigress.

The most skilled warriors in China, they are homages to the Five Animals Southern styles of Chinese martial arts: crane, viper, monkey, mantis, and tiger. In the Kung Fu Panda: Legends of Awesomeness episode "Owl Be Back", it is revealed that different incarnations of the Five had been defending the Valley of Peace for centuries.

==== Tigress ====
Master Tigress (voiced by Angelina Jolie in the films, Tara Strong as a cub in the first film and Secrets of the Furious Five, and Kari Wahlgren in Legends of Awesomeness, silent cameo in end credits of Kung Fu Panda 4) is a female South China tiger who is the leader of the Furious Five. She was initially the most resentful of Po when he was chosen to be the Dragon Warrior instead of her, and the most vocal in her contempt. When Tigress overheard Po telling Shifu that he would never be able to defeat Tai Lung, Tigress took it upon herself to intercept the leopard, and managed to counter most of his attacks. When Po defeats Tai Lung, Tigress is very impressed, and the first to acknowledge him as a master of kung fu. As the film series progresses, Tigress grows closest to Po among his friends in the Jade Palace.

Tigress' backstory is largely revealed in a series of television specials. In Secrets of the Furious Five, it is revealed that she was an orphan living in the Bao Gu Orphanage, feared by the other children for her strength, and she taught herself control by learning to play dominoes. Despite this breakthrough, the adults who came to adopt the orphans were still afraid of her, so Shifu decided to adopt her. In Secrets of the Scroll, it is revealed that Shifu disapproved of her aggression and strength, wanting her to emphasize his control and precision. Oogway, on the contrary, encouraged Tigress to be herself.

==== Viper ====
Master Viper (voiced by Lucy Liu in the films and short-films, Legends of Awesomeness, silent cameo in end credits of Kung Fu Panda 4) is a female green tree viper with two small lotus flowers on top of her head. Viper is the most outwardly compassionate member of the Five, and is the only one not to mock Po when he first joins the Jade Palace.

In Secrets of the Furious Five, she is revealed to be the daughter of Great Master Viper, who relied on his venomous fangs to protect the village where they lived. The Great Master hoped that his daughter would carry on his legacy, but he discovered that she was born without fangs. Viper instead took up ribbon dancing at a young age, and showed a proficiency for it. When a gorilla bandit came to the Autumn Moon Festival and shattered the Great Master's fangs using venom-proof armor, Viper used her dancing to tie the bandit up in her ribbon. Only then did her father accept his daughter becoming a warrior on her own terms. Years later, she managed to grow a pair of small, blunt fangs.

==== Monkey ====
Master Monkey (voiced by Jackie Chan in the films, and James Sie in Legends of Awesomeness, silent cameo in end credits of Kung Fu Panda 4) is a male golden langur with a thick Chinese accent who is the second-in-command of the Furious Five and the most humorous of the Five. He was the first to recognize Po's determination, and the first to refer to Po by his name. Unlike the other members of the Five, Monkey prefers to use a weapon in combat, and the staff that he uses is associated with the legendary Monkey King Sun Wukong.

Monkey has an older brother, Wu Kong, who is the self-proclaimed "King of Thieves", and their mother died from shock and grief of seeing her sons fight. Nevertheless, Monkey was an adolescent trickster, who humiliated the members of his village with pranks. Oogway put an end to Monkey's trickery, using his shell to hide from his attacks, and the tortoise encouraged Monkey to use his skills for good, putting him on the path to kung fu mastery.

==== Mantis ====
Master Mantis (voiced by Seth Rogen in films and Chip 'n Dale: Rescue Rangers, and Max Koch in Legends of Awesomeness) is a male Chinese mantis and the smallest of the Five. He is, however, the strongest proportional to his size, and can move at superhuman speeds. When Po's girth was cited as a reason why he could not be a kung fu master, Mantis was the first to decide that size did little to define a warrior. In the fourth film, he is mentioned to be in a relationship and has avoided his head being eaten by his partner as part of the courtship ritual.

==== Crane ====
Master Crane (voiced by David Cross in the films and Amir Talai in Legends of Awesomeness, silent cameo in end credits of Kung Fu Panda 4) is a male black-necked crane and the most patient of the Five. He serves as a scout and lookout in combat situations, as well as a means of transport for the other members of the Five. Should any of the Five fall from a great height, Crane will appear to break their fall.

Before joining the Five, Crane was the janitor at the Lee Da Kung Fu Academy, where he was looked down upon due to his slender build. However, Mei Ling, the top student, saw the skills that Crane used when cleaning the academy, and convinced him to try out for the school. While his nerve got the better of him at first, Crane soon gained the confidence to pass the obstacle course and gain admission into the academy. Between the events of the third and fourth films, Crane was crowned the king of the crocodilians.

=== Oogway ===
Grand Master Oogway (voiced by Randall Duk Kim in the Kung Fu Panda and Kung Fu Panda 3, silent cameo in Kung Fu Panda 2, television specials, and Legends of Awesomeness, Greg Baldwin in the video games, and Piotr Michael in The Paws of Destiny), was an elderly Galápagos Tortoise, the senior headmaster of the Jade Palace before Shifu, and the creator of kung fu. Highly venerated for his wisdom, knowledge, and experience, Oogway was considered by many to be a sage. He was known as the greatest kung fu master in history, with no other reputation surpassing his. In the first film, he is the one to choose Po as the Dragon Warrior, much to everyone's surprise, and his warmth and acceptance of Po serve as a foil to the strict and abrasive Shifu. He dies and ascends to the Spirit Realm in the first film, but appears in the DreamWorks intro taking Moonboy's Spot on The DreamWorks logo sitting on the crescent moon where Moonboy usually sits before the title card for the film appears again in flashback cameos in the second film.

In the third film, while meditating in the Spirit Realm, Oogway is attacked by his former friend, Kai, who steals his chi and escapes the realm. After Po defeats Kai, he meets Oogway in the Spirit Realm, where Oogway explains to Po that on the first day they met, he saw both the future of kung fu in Po, as well as the past. He sensed that Po would be the one to unite them both and become his true successor. He then presents Po with his staff, to which he was hesitant to accept, before Po returns to the mortal realm.

=== Zhen ===
Zhen (voiced by Awkwafina) is a corsac fox and thief in Juniper City. Initially raised by a band of thieves, Zhen was eventually taken in by the Chameleon after she took over the city, as she saw the potential in her. The next years Zhen stole things for her master, which made her the enemy of most people in the city. One day she is sent to the Jade Palace to attempt to steal the Staff of Wisdom, but is trapped by Po. As she is locked up, she overhears of Tai Lung's apparent return and tells Po that the attacker is not his old nemesis, but the Chameleon. After negotiating with Po, he agrees to take her with him to Juniper City so he can defeat the Chameleon. During their trip however, she and Po become close friends, as he becomes the first genuine friend she has, and believes she can change. Eventually Zhen betrays Po by getting the staff and giving it to the Chameleon, but quickly regrets it and is devastated when he is apparently killed. Zhen then discovers that the Chameleon never cared for her, and would get rid of her as soon as she stopped being useful. After seeing her bring back Tai Lung and other deceased masters to get their chi, Zhen finally defects fully from the Chameleon. She attempts to stop Po from fighting her, but when it is clear that he will not stop, she, alongside Mr. Ping and Li Shan, recruits the thief band that raised her so they can distract the guards so she can get to Po in time. Zhen arrives just in time to help an overwhelmed Po. The Chameleon, angered by her betrayal, transforms into a beast with all the kung fu masters' skills, and a Po clone to fight the duo; Zhen decided to stand back while Po fights his clone alone, but he is apparently trapped in a cage, so Po gives Zhen his staff so she can defeat the Chameleon. This time Zhen keeps her loyalty and uses the techniques Po taught her to stun the Chameleon. Po soon reveals he was never trapped and was just testing Zhen's heart, before he delivers the final blow towards the Chameleon with the technique. After the past villains give Po their respect, Zhen watches as Tai Lung takes her old master to the Spirit Realm with him. The Chameleon pleads for her help, but she dismisses her and watches her get trapped in the realm. She, Po, and his fathers return to the Valley of Peace, where she intends to serve her time before starting a new life. To her surprise, Po instead chooses her to be his successor as the Dragon Warrior, and begins training her alongside the Furious Five.

== List of Kung Fu Masters ==
A series of kung fu masters appear in the franchise, many of which only appear in passing within the TV show or comics.

=== Masters' Council of Gongmen City ===
The Masters' Council are the protectors of the metropolis of Gongmen City. They are a group of renowned Kung Fu Masters who govern the city after the city’s monarchy had dissolved.

- Master Thundering Rhino (voiced by Victor Garber in Kung Fu Panda 2 and Paul Scheer in Secrets of the Masters) is an Indian rhinoceros and the leader of the Masters' Council. His father is the legendary Master Flying Rhino, and he became legendary himself by slaying the Ten Thousand Serpents in the Valley of Woe. When Lord Shen defeats Ox and Croc, Rhino breaks his weapons and warns him that he is no match for kung fu. Shen agrees before revealing one of his cannons, and uses it to kill Rhino.
- Master Storming Ox (voiced by Dennis Haysbert) is a water buffalo, another Master of Gongmen City and a member of the Masters' Council. He is an expert strategist who was trained by Master Thundering Rhino after sneaking into the Royal Palace. When Shen storms the Palace, Ox is imprisoned. Ox initially refuses to join the Five, believing that Shen will threaten to turn his cannon on the city. Ox changes his mind at Shifu's persuasion and joins forces with Po and the Furious Five to crush Shen's army.
- Master Croc (voiced by Jean-Claude Van Damme in Kung Fu Panda 2 and Kung Fu Panda 3 and Tony Leondis in Secrets of the Masters) is a saltwater crocodile, another Master of Gongmen City, and a member of the Masters' Council. He was once the head of the Wool Stealing Crocodile Bandits of Crocodile Island until Master Thundering Rhino convinced him to mend his ways. When Lord Shen storms the Royal Palace, Master Croc is imprisoned. Croc initially refuses to join the Five, believing that Shen will threaten to turn his cannon on the city. Croc changes his mind at Shifu's persuasion and joins forces with Po and the Furious Five to defeat Shen's army. In the third film, when Kai steals the chi of every Kung fu master, Croc has his chi stolen and becomes a member of Kai's army. He is returned to normal after Po defeats Kai in the Spirit Realm.

=== Other Kung Fu Masters ===
- Master Flying Rhino (voiced by David Cowgill) is the father and trainer of Thundering Rhino. He also trained Vachir, and recommended him to Oogway as the head of Tai Lung's incarceration at Chorh-Gom Prison. His armor is currently on display in the Hall of Warriors.
- Great Master Viper (voiced by James Sie) is the father of Master Viper and the last known leader of the Viper Clan. He was proud of his use of venomous fangs in combat, and was displeased when his daughter was born without them. He later changed his mind when a gorilla bandit broke his fangs, and his daughter subdued him with her ribbon dancing.
- Master Chao (voiced by James Sie) is an orange Asian water monitor and a member of the Sacred Oryx Council. Displeased with Po and Shifu's disobedience, Chao replaces Shifu with Master Junjie as leader of the Jade Palace. When Junjie reveals his villainy and is subdued by Po, Chao commends the panda for doing the right thing despite the risk.
- Master Yao (voiced by Paul Rugg) is a markhor known for his intellect. He spent a lifetime meditating alone, bearing no contact with the outside world. When Yao comes out of hiding, he is ecstatic at everything surrounding him. Despite his lack of physical strength, Yao uses his mental abilities to knock the Qidan Clan unconscious.
- Mrs. Gow (voiced by Amy Hill) is an elderly goat and former kung fu master, known as Gow of the Hundred Stars. When Mr. Ping suggests that Mrs. Gow and Mr. Yeung help defend the Jade Palace, Po dismisses them on account of their age, but Gow proves her worth.
- Master Shengqi (voiced by Tim Dadabo) is a water buffalo who was falsely imprisoned for protecting his daughter Xiao Niao from Duke Pingjun when she accidentally ruined the latter's giant moon cake. He breaks out of prison and has a bounty placed on him. Po doesn't believe his story until he sees Shengqi wearing half of Xiao Niao's necklace. When Constable Hu is told the truth, he reverses Shengqi's sentence.
- Master Kweng (voiced by Jim Meskimen) is a goat and the CEO of Kung Fu Express, a group of messenger-warriors. He nearly creates a war between the Gorilla Clans when he takes a peace treaty with the Dragon Warrior's autograph.
- Mistress Mugan (voiced by April Winchell) is a Shubunkin goldfish and the master of Garnet Palace. She dislikes Po for his lack of discipline, and is possessive over her students. Tigress goes with her to be the new master of the Garnet Palace, and is trapped there until Po and Wu Yong trap her in her tank.
- Master Elephant (voiced by Nolan North) is an Asian elephant and an original member of the original Furious Five, along with Shifu, Fenghuang, Master Snow Leopard, and Master Rooster. When Po teams up with the original five to retrieve the Sword of Xi'an, Master Elephant is possessed by the owner of the blade and is freed by both the current and past incarnations of the Five.

== Villains ==
=== Films ===
==== Tai Lung ====
Tai Lung (voiced by Ian McShane in the films and André Sogliuzzo in the television series) is a muscular snow leopard and the main antagonist of Kung Fu Panda. He has supernatural strength, with an incredibly prideful and ruthless attitude towards any kung fu practitioner. Shifu's adopted son that he cared for dearly, Tai Lung was the only student to be taught the Nerve Attack, and he believed that his destiny was to become the Dragon Warrior. When Oogway sensed the darkness in Tai Lung's heart and refused to give him the scroll that would allow him to claim the title, he felt betrayed and laid siege to the city in fury and then overwhelmed Shifu in combat to try to claim the scroll, only to be finally defeated at the hands of Master Oogway. Afterwards, Tai Lung was sent to Chorh-Gom Prison as a result of his actions, remaining imprisoned for twenty years.

When Zeng arrives at the prison to order an increase in security, Tai Lung uses one of the goose's fallen feathers to pick the locks on his restraints and escape. He defeats the Furious Five in battle and storms the Jade Palace in search of the Dragon Scroll. In his hunt for the scroll, he overpowers Shifu and nearly kills him in spite of temporarily having a moment of clarity, but Po lures him away with the dragon scroll, sparking a brutal confrontation between them. After Po is momentarily stunned, he finally sees the Scroll, but does not understand the symbolism of its blank, reflective surface (there is no secret to ultimate power, it all depends in the person who has it), even after Po points it out to him, leading to a final fight against Po, but in spite of his skill and power, he's defeated by Po who is immune to the Nerve attack and Po overwhelming him with improvised attacks. Po utilizes the Wuxi Finger Hold on him, obliterating Tai Lung. Tai Lung's defeat marks Po as a Kung fu warrior. In Kung Fu Panda 3, it's explained that the Finger Hold instantly exiles its victim by sending it to the Spirit Realm, indicating that Tai Lung resides there.

Tai Lung returns in Kung Fu Panda 4, where he returns from his exile. After the Chameleon steals Po's wisdom staff, she uses it to open a gate to the spirit realm and calls for Tai Lung. Tai Lung is surprised to hear she bested Po, as while he thinks he is a fool, he would never give away Oogway's staff. Tai Lung successfully battles the Chameleon's henchmen but is surprised attacked by her and gets his Kung fu stolen. He is then locked in a cage while the Chameleon summons other masters. Tai Lung later reunites with Po and scolds him for losing the staff, saying Oogway made a mistake choosing him as Dragon Warrior. Tai Lung watches the battle between Po, Zhen, and the Chameleon, and even cheers for Po at a moment. After the Chameleon is finally defeated and Tai Lung gets his skills back, he confronts Po and tells him that he can finally see why Oogway chose him, admiring how much Po has grown. Tai Lung then bows in respect and asks Po to take him and the others back to the Spirit Realm. He grabs the Chameleon and takes her with him to the Spirit Realm. Before he departs, Tai Lung finally acknowledges Po as the Dragon Warrior, finally redeeming himself.

Tai Lung's name is Cantonese for "Great Dragon" (大龍 daai6 lung4), which was inspired by that of the protagonist from T'ai Fu: Wrath of the Tiger (a game developed by DreamWorks Interactive before the release of the first film), whose name is a play on another Cantonese vocabulary containing a similar meaning.

==== Shen ====
Lord Shen (voiced by Gary Oldman, silent role in Kung Fu Panda 4) is a leucistic Indian peacock and the main antagonist of Kung Fu Panda 2. He was originally the heir to the throne of Gongmen City who wanted more than only control over the city. Growing up, he became obsessed with weaponizing gunpowder. His parents, deeply concerned about his obsession, visited the Soothsayer, who prophesied that if he continued too far down this path, he would be defeated by "a warrior of black and white". Shen, eavesdropping on this conversation, deduced that the warrior was a panda. Instead of reflecting on his obsession, he led his parents’ wolf guards into a massacre against the giant panda population to avert the prophecy, which resulted in Po being sent to Mr. Ping to survive. Shen’s father exiled him from the city but Shen, feeling betrayed, warned that he would return one day and China would bow before him.

Thirty years later, Shen returns to Gongmen City with an arsenal of cannons. He summons the Masters' Council to a duel, where he defeats Storming Ox and Croc, and kills Thundering Rhino with a cannonball shot. He initially thinks Po a simpleton and not the warrior of prophecy, but comes to fear him as he displays his skills and attempts to kill him with a cannon blast to avoid his prophesized defeat. Po returns, having been nursed back to health by the Soothsayer and having achieved inner peace, and redirects the onslaught of cannonballs fired at him, destroying Shen's fleet. On the wreckage of Shen’s flagship, Po attempts to convince Shen to let go of his past and choose his future. Despite agreeing to choose his future, he refuses to let go of his pain and attacks Po in a blind fury. He accidentally cuts the ropes that hold up the remains of his final cannon, causing it to fall. Po leaps to safety but Shen, realizing that he has been defeated, accepts his fate and is crushed to death. Po narrowly escapes the resulting explosion.

Lord Shen appears in Kung Fu Panda 4, but only in a silent role. He is brought back from the Spirt Realm by the Chameleon. After Po defeats the Chameleon, Shen gets his skills back and returns to the Spirit Realm.

==== Wolf Boss ====
The one-eyed Wolf Boss (voiced by Danny McBride in Kung Fu Panda 2) is an unnamed wolf who is the leader of Lord Shen's wolf army. He's essentially his second-in-command. He is ultimately stabbed by Shen with his feather-blades because he refused to fire against his own men with the cannons in a desperate attempt to slay Po.

==== Kai ====
General Kai, or simply Kai (voiced by J. K. Simmons, silent role in Kung Fu Panda 4), is a yak, and the main antagonist of Kung Fu Panda 3. He was originally a friend and brother-in-arms to Grand Master Oogway, and was taught how to use chi by the pandas of the Secret Panda Village. Kai became power-hungry with the knowledge, and learned how to take chi from others, forcing Oogway to send him to the Spirit Realm. Kai spent the next five hundred years collecting the chi of every kung fu master who ended up in the Spirit Realm after dying before challenging Oogway to a duel, successfully overpowering him and absorbing his chi, allowing him to come back to the world of the living. As soon as he escapes he uses the stolen chi to create jade warriors (jombies) and rampage the land, seeking to erase all of Oogway's accomplishments out of resentment for being nearly forgotten by history for his treachery.

Kai and his jade warriors begin assaulting the Earth upon their arrival and begins stealing the chi of the living kung fu masters, including Master Shifu and all members of the Furious Five except Tigress, who escapes to warn Po of his coming. When Kai and his "Jombies" reach the Secret Panda Village, Po attempts to use the Wuxi Finger Hold on him, but it does not work on a spirit warrior. Po instead uses the move on himself to bring both of them back to the Spirit Realm and halt his rampage. While he temporarily gains the upper hand against Po and almost absorbs him, he is soon overpowered when Po is empowered with the Chi of the inhabitants of the panda village along with Tigress and Mr. Ping to transform into Dragon Warrior chi. Ultimately, Po overloads Kai with chi, defeating him and freeing all the masters whose chi he had stolen.

Kai appears in a non-speaking role in Kung Fu Panda 4, in which he is brought back from the Sprit Realm by the Chameleon. After Po defeats the Chameleon. Kai gets his skills back and returns to the Spirit Realm.

==== The Chameleon ====
The Chameleon (voiced by Viola Davis) is a veiled chameleon and the main antagonist of Kung Fu Panda 4. She is a sorceress who has the ability to change her appearance to look like anyone she pleases.

The Chameleon first appears in the beginning of the movie disguised as Tai Lung and scaring workers at a mine. She is later revealed to be the effective ruler of Juniper City, oppressing the local crime bosses and demanding hefty tributes from them to finance an army to conquer the entire region, up to the Valley of Peace. She sends her protegee, Zhen, to acquire Po's Staff of Wisdom. Zhen lures Po to Juniper City, where he loses the staff to The Chameleon, which she uses to summon various kung-fu masters from the spirit realm, including Tai Lung, Shen and Kai, absorb their chi and kung-fu skills, and lock them in cages. After Po fights her with the help of a reformed Zhen and defeats her, he uses the Staff to return all the trapped masters their chi. He then sends them back to the Spirit Realm, with Tai Lung taking The Chameleon with him.

In the early drafts of Kung Fu Panda 4, The Chameleon was depicted to be a human character known as "The Collector". However, for unknown reasons, this idea was scrapped.

==== Wu Sisters ====
Su Wu, Wing Wu, and Wan Wu (voiced by Sumalee Montano in Secrets of the Masters) are a trio of snow leopard sisters appearing in Secrets of the Masters. Once the sisters escaped prison, where they were kept for a series of crimes, they set out to unite the various crime families of China, which prompted Oogway to form an alliance with Thundering Rhino, Storming Ox, and Croc in order to defeat them. The Wu sisters also appear as an enemy team in Kung Fu Panda: The Game, and as minions of Tai Lung in Legendary Warriors.

==== Boar ====
Boar (voiced by Jayden Lund) is an unnamed boar and the main antagonist of Kung Fu Panda: Secrets of the Scroll. A renowned warrior, Shifu intended to stop him, but was bedridden due to accidental food poisoning, and Tigress went in his place. When mimicking Shifu's style of combat, Tigress initially faltered, but when the rest of the Five came to her aid, Tigress abandoned Shifu's kung fu style in favor of her own, and managed to defeat him. Boar's attack and subsequent defeat inspired the creation of the Furious Five, and the story of their triumph sparked Po's love of kung fu.

=== Comic ===
- Kuo is a Tibetan antelope who appears in the comic "Art of Balance". He initially appears to be a fan of Mr. Ping's noodles, but soon reveals himself to be a restaurant owner who went out of business because of Ping's popularity. Kuo blames Mr. Ping for making him a failure, but Po tells Kuo that he simply lost his balance.
- Qinchu is a Tibetan fox who appears in the comic "Special Delivery". The self-elected official of Mount Penglai, Qinchu hijacked a series of mail carts in search for the key to the city, which was passed from one location to another so that its exact whereabouts were always a mystery. Qinchu planned to use the key to lock the gates and isolate the city, but Po vanquishes him and leaves him to his angry citizens.
- The Five Elements Imposters appear in the comic "It's Elemental". They take advantage of a prophecy that one day, the Five Elements would take physical forms and become the ultimate protectors of the world. Po discovered the charade, and uncovered that the group used sesame oil, hidden containers, and concealed weapons to mimic the Five Elements.

=== Television ===
- Scorpion (voiced by Lynn Milgrim) is an unnamed female scorpion. She was once the best healer in the Valley of Peace, until she injected herself with a hypnosis potion and kept the villagers under her spell for many years. Oogway breaks the spell and exiles her, but Scorpion steals the last sun orchid, a cure for river fever. When Po and Monkey hunt for the cure to Tigress' river fever, they find Scorpion, who hypnotizes Monkey before ultimately being defeated.
- Fung (voiced by John DiMaggio) is a mugger crocodile and the leader of a group of Crocodile Bandits. He is a recurring antagonist in Kung Fu Panda: Legends of Awesomeness, although he occasionally mends his ways for the sake of his family.
  - Gahri (voiced by Fred Tatasciore) is another mugger crocodile and the second-in-command of Fung's bandit gang. Despite being clumsy and apologetic, he does show great skill in battle, particularly with an axe. His name is usually mispronounced as "Gary" by Fung. He leaves the bandits in the episode "The Break Up" and gets a job at Ping's Noodle Shop.
  - Lidong (voiced by Jim Cummings) is a saltwater crocodile and Fung's younger cousin. He was originally a runt, and became proud of his size and strength after a growth burst. As such, he is enraged by anyone of a larger size than he is. In "Huge", Mantis uses a magic potion to reduce Lidong to a fraction of his size.
- Temutai (voiced by Kevin Michael Richardson) is a water buffalo and the Warrior-King of the Qidan Clan. He has claimed to have beaten every kung fu master in the land, and appears as a recurring antagonist in Kung Fu Panda: Legends of Awesomeness.
  - Jing Mei (voiced by Kevin Michael Richardson) is a water buffalo, member of the Qidan Clan, and Temutai's nephew. In "The Kung Fu Kid", Temutai enters Jing Mei into the children's kung fu competition, where he is defeated by Peng.
- Taotie (voiced by Wallace Shawn) is a warthog and recurring antagonist in Kung Fu Panda: Legends of Awesomeness. He is a mechanic who built the training hall for the Furious Five, and he used to train with Master Shifu. Taotie had a falling-out with Shifu and Oogway about the use of machines to surpass kung fu, and he vowed to get revenge. Taotie frequently uses automated machines such as iron claws or moving figurines to attack the Five.
  - Bian-Zao (voiced by Simon Helberg) is the teenage son of Taotie, a reluctant helper in his father's plans. He assists Taotie with the construction of his revenge plots, but often feels guilt about it.
- Jong Sung Jai Kai Chow (voiced by Wayne Knight) is a takin and the ruler of a portion of land that looks poorly upon trespassers. Fung tricks Po into helping him break into Jong's castle to abduct the ruler's son, who Fung claims is his brother. When Jong's guards go to the Jade Palace and tell Shifu that they saw Po aid in the abduction, Po is nearly killed under the trespasser's penalty.
- Tong Fo (voiced by Jeff Bennett) is a slow loris and a crime lord once known for holding the Sacred Hammer of Lei Lang. He was imprisoned for the destruction he caused with the hammer, but hid the weapon in Camelback Mountain before his incarceration.
- Fenghuang (voiced by Wendie Malick) is a Eurasian eagle-owl and a member of the previous Furious Five, alongside Shifu, Master Snow Leopard, Master Rooster, and Master Elephant. The strongest member of the original Five, Fenghuang became power-hungry, and challenged Oogway to a fight for the palace. She eventually flees for the Northern Mountains, but returns upon hearing of Oogway's death. Po pretends to have turned against Master Shifu to earn Fenghuang's trust before placing her in the cage Oogway once created for her.
- Master Junjie (voiced by Stephen Root) is a red fox and a member of the Sacred Oryx Council. He holds a grudge against Master Shifu, who was chosen to run the Jade Palace, and he believes Po unworthy of the Dragon Warrior mantle.
- Hundun (voiced by Diedrich Bader) is a Javan rhinoceros who speaks in Tautology and a former member of the Anvil of Heaven at Chorh-Gom Prison. When the prison was closed down after Tai Lung's escape, Hundun was left without a job, and blamed his failures on the Dragon Warrior.
- Bao (voiced by Fred Tatasciore) is a pig who, along with his accomplices Lao and Tsao, attack Mr. Ping's noodle shop. After being defeated, they decide they want to learn kung fu and kidnap Mr. Ping, who they mistook for Master Shifu.
- Su (voiced by Amy Hill) is a snow leopard and the leader of the Ladies of the Shade, a group of thieves who distract their targets through parasol dancing. Su assigns Song to get close to Po and enable the Ladies to enter the Jade Palace. Once inside, they steal the Dragon Chalice and escape to their campsite. Song turns against Su and helps to defeat her, taking over the Ladies.
- Wu Kong (voiced by James Sie) is a golden snub-nosed monkey, the older brother of Master Monkey, and the self-proclaimed Prince of Thieves. He has a strained relationship with his brother. Wu Kong appears in the episode "Monkey in the Middle", where he comes to the Valley of Peace to go on a crime spree across the village market.
- Meng Tao (voiced by Jim Meskimen) is an antelope and the diplomat to the Emperor of China. When Po makes a rash vow to train the emperor's grandson in kung fu, the antelope informs him that breaking the vow would result in beheading every member of the Jade Palace. It was revealed that he wanted Lu Kang to fail, knowing that disgrace to the emperor's family would allow him to take the throne. Lu Kang, however, is successfully trained and manages to defeat Meng Tao in combat.
- General Tsin (voiced by R. Lee Ermey) is a yak who is a hunter and a retired war hero. Unhappy with his retirement, Tsin begins "collecting" villains around the Valley of Peace, subjecting them to stiffening Zu Chao Powder. Po evades the powder and frees the villains, who willingly team up with Po to get revenge. He later returned where he was hunting a Qilin.
- The Undertaker (voiced by Christopher McDonald) is a goat and the property caretaker of the local cemetery. In "The Po Who Cried Ghost", it is revealed that he has been using a mystical staff to raise an army of Jiangshi. Po snatches the staff and orders the Jiangshi to return to the earth and be at peace.
- Ke-Pa (voiced by Alfred Molina) is a dragon-like demon and the leader of all the demons from the Underworld, who was subdued by Oogway and the power of the Peach Tree. He takes the mortal guise of a Taihu pig and begins to gain his power back as the Peach Tree dies. Po is nearly killed when his Hero's Chi is stolen, but his powers are regained by a sapling that Shifu planted at the end of the first film and he uses his power to defeat Ke-Pa.
- Master Ding (voiced by Enn Reitel) is a pig and a former kung fu master who used his spirit orbs to commit psychic attacks on innocent victims. When Po and Tigress accidentally release Ding's spirit orbs, they have to battle Ding's ghost.
- Heilang (voiced by Maurice LaMarche) is the leader of the Lin Kuei, a group of wolf assassins and thieves. Trained from birth to steal expensive and powerful artifacts from Kung Fu masters, Heilang and the Lin Kuei attempt to steal the Phantom Orb and the Shadow Crown, two artifacts which make the wearer intangible or invisible. Both times, they are defeated by members of the Furious Five.
- Pai Mei (voiced by Clancy Brown) is an emperor tamarin and a rogue kung fu master. He was exiled by Master Shifu after attempting to overpower the emperor, but reappears in "Five is Enough". The Five defeat him, and Pai Mei is last seen falling off of a cliff.
- Mei Ling (voiced by Susanne Blakeslee) is a female red fox, not to be confused with the snow leopard of the same name. A rogue kung fu master, Mei Ling was also Shifu's love interest until she refused to stop using her skills for thievery. Despite this, Shifu still harbors feelings for Mei Ling, and they reconnect after her redemption in "Crazy Little Ling Called Love".
- Kira Kozu (voiced by Tohoru Masamune) is a clam and former samurai who betrayed Yijiro and the Ishida Clan, becoming a Rōnin with plans to take over Japan. Po defeats Kira using the samurai methods taught to him by Yijiro.
- Fu-xi (voiced by Dwight Schultz) is a king cobra named after the Chinese deity. Once a famous hero, Fu-Xi felt betrayed by the "two-leggers", and attempted to recruit Master Viper to fight alongside him.
- Sanzu (voiced by John Kassir) is a Chinese pangolin and the greedy caretaker of a group of orphans, who he organized into stealing for him. Po freed the orphans from Sanzu's control and placed them in the care of Mrs. Yoon.
- Ju-Long (voiced by Paul Reubens) is a rat and the leader of the Lao Shu, a band of renegade rats, described by Master Shifu as "deadly and unbalanced". His diminutive size allows him to evade larger opponents. In "The Hunger Game", Ju-Long collaborated with Madame Zhao to steal food from the Valley of Peace, only to be betrayed by her and imprisoned with Po.
- Madame Zhao (voiced by Gaille Heidemann) is a gazelle who tricked Po into visiting her if he ever needed food. She uses this to imprison him in an underground room, but was vanquished by Po and Ju-Long.
- Jindiao
- White Bone Demon
- Klaus and Veruca Dumont

== List of supporting characters ==
=== Mr. Ping ===
Mr. Ping (voiced by James Hong) is a Chinese goose and the owner of the most popular noodle shop in the Valley of Peace. He adopted Po when he found a baby panda in one of the shop's radish crate deliveries. Ping worries about Po, especially in his continued development as a kung fu master, but is the one to tell him that things are special if someone believes them to be.

Po and Mr. Ping's relationship becomes strained when Po learns that his biological father, Li Shan, is still alive, but he comes to realize that having Li Shan in Po's life does not mean less for him, but more for Po.

In the fourth film, Mr. Ping is currently good friends with Li, and opens a new restaurant with him. When they hear Po has gone to face the Chameleon, the duo travels to help their son out, reaching him just in time after he is thrown off a cliff. Later, Mr. Ping and Li join Han's thief gang to distract the Chameleon's guards so Zhen can get to Po in time to help him stop the Chameleon. Mr. Ping later returns to the Valley Of Peace with Po, Zhen, and Li.

James Hong is the only voice actor to reprise his role as Mr. Ping in the films, television series, and video games.

=== Li Shan ===
Li Shan (voiced by Fred Tatasciore in Kung Fu Panda 2, Bryan Cranston in Kung Fu Panda 3 and Kung Fu Panda 4 and Christopher Swindle in The Paws of Destiny) is a giant panda, and the biological father of Po. He was separated from his son when Lord Shen's wolf army attacked their village, and was presumed dead with the other pandas. At the end of Kung Fu Panda 2, he is revealed to be alive and hiding in a secret refuge.

In the third film, Li and Po reunite, and Li convinces his son to stay with the other pandas. He lies about knowing chi in order to prevent Po from leaving, but when Kai turns most of the masters into jade warriors, Li is part of the panda army that resists.

In the fourth film, Li is currently good friends with Mr. Ping, and opens a new restaurant with him. When they hear Po has gone to face the Chameleon, the duo travels to help their son out, reaching him just in time after he is thrown off a cliff. Later, Mr. Ping and him join Han's thief gang to distract the Chameleon's guards so Zhen can get to Po in time to help him stop the Chameleon. Li later returns to the Valley Of Peace with Po, Zhen, and Mr. Ping.

=== Shirong ===
Shirong (voiced by Malcolm McDowell) is a red panda and the father of Master Shifu. A con artist by trade, Shirong used his son as a shill before abandoning him at the Jade Palace. In the Legends of Awesomeness episode "Father Crime", Shirong stages a kidnapping in order to reconnect with his son, but Shifu is captured by Tong Fo in the process. Shirong, along with Po and Tigress, helps to free his son, and they end on good terms.

=== Zeng ===
Zeng (voiced by Dan Fogler) is a swan goose and a messenger of Master Shifu. Ironically, while he is given a message by Shifu to double the security at Chorh-Gom Prison and prevent Tai Lung's escape, Tai Lung uses one of Zeng's fallen feathers to pick the lock on his restraints and escape. Zeng is spared in the resulting prison break, but is forced to return to the valley and herald Tai Lung's escape. His role in the film is a reflection of Oogway's proverb, "one often meets his destiny on the road he takes to avoid it".

=== Vachir ===
Commander Vachir (voiced by Michael Clarke Duncan) is a Javan rhinoceros, the chief of security at Chorh-Gom Prison, and the leader of the Anvil of Heaven, an army of elite battle rhinos. Prior to Tai Lung's incarceration, the Anvil opposed tyranny and injustice throughout China. Vachir was tasked with the construction of the prison, and personally oversaw Tai Lung's imprisonment for twenty years. When Tai Lung made his escape, Vachir was caught in an explosion with many of his troops and killed.

=== Wo Hop ===
Wo Hop (voiced by Jack McBrayer) is a rabbit and a renowned chef who auditioned for the honor to cook for the Kung Fu Masters Winter Festival banquet. Po, unfamiliar with the intricate customs of the selection process, inadvertently disgraced Wo Hop while waving to Monkey, and the chef became desperate to redeem himself through his own death. Po contained the rabbit and helped him complete a meal for the banquet. After the meal was complete, Po presented Hop with the Golden Ladle, the intended honor for the official cook of the feast, which restored Wo Hop's honor.

=== Soothsayer ===
The Soothsayer (voiced by Michelle Yeoh) is an elderly goat and Shen's former nanny, who foretold the peacock's doom. She tries to advise Shen to stop his violent crusade to no avail. She also aids Po, treating him with acupuncture and a herbal mixture after his presumed death. The Soothsayer knows what Shen did to Po's village long ago, and helps Po stop fighting his memories in order to achieve inner peace and be able to stop Shen.

=== Peng ===
Peng (voiced by Danny Cooksey) is a snow leopard and the nephew of Tai Lung. He leaves his life as an assistant potter to become a self-taught prodigy in the martial arts, which brings him to the Jade Palace. Peng shows a great aptitude for the martial arts, but needs help reining in his temper. Po reveals to Peng the kind of character Tai Lung was in order to stop the leopard from avenging his uncle. He later creates a Kung Fu Fight Club, teaching citizens how to defend themselves.

=== Song ===
Song (voiced by Lauren Tom) is a young snow leopard and a member of the Ladies of the Shade, a group of bandits who distract their marks with parasol dancing. Su, the leader of the Ladies, tasks Song with charming Po into allowing the gang to enter the Jade Palace. As she talks to him, Song begins to like Po, and is about to tell him the truth of her origin when Su arrives and asks if the ladies can spend the night in the Palace. When the Ladies abscond with the dragon chalice, Po follows them to their campsite, and rejects Song's apology. Nevertheless, when Su and the other Ladies find Po, Song protects him, and she becomes the leader of the group after Su's defeat.

=== Constable Hu ===
Constable Hu (voiced by Neil Ross) is an Asian elephant and recurring character in Kung Fu Panda: Legends of Awesomeness. He is largely stoic and focused on his job. In "The Midnight Stranger", he outlaws the practice of kung fu, a decision later revealed to be forced upon him by the pig criminals.

=== Grandma Panda ===
Grandma Panda (voiced by Barbara Dirikson) is an elderly female panda Po meets after arriving at Panda Village. At the end of Kung Fu Panda 3, she hugs with the others after Po destroyed Kai.

=== Han ===
Han (Voiced by Ke Huy Quan) is a Sunda pangolin and the leader of the den of thieves in Juniper City. He has a grudge against Zhen after she abandoned him for the Chameleon.

== Characters exclusive to the video games ==
=== Appearing in Kung Fu Panda: The Video Game ===
Kung Fu Panda: The Video Game is a PlayStation 3 and Xbox 360 release loosely based on the film of the same name. In it, Tai Lung recruits a series of gangs and bandits to aid him after escaping from Chor-Gom Prison.

- Blackhoof Boar Clan Leader (voiced by Bill Farmer) - A boar who is the leader of the Blackhoof Boar Clan.
- Queen Crocodile (voiced by Susan Blakeslee) - An obese saltwater crocodile and the leader of the Imperial Golden Croc Gang, she is accidentally awakened when Po and Master Crane rescue the last remaining tortoise egg, and sends her husband, the Crocodile Sergeant after them.
  - Crocodile Sergeant - A saltwater crocodile who is the husband of the Queen Crocodile and leader of the Imperial Gold Croc Gang.
- Great Gorilla (voiced by Phil Morris) - A mountain gorilla and the leader of a gang of gorillas. Following Great Gorilla's defeat, remnants of his gang worked with the Lang Shadow Army.
- Lang Shadow Army - An army of Tibetan wolves that served Tai Lung prior to his defeat and incarceration. When Tai Lung escaped from Chor-Gom Prison, the Lang Shadow Army came out of hiding and assisted their master once again. They were later joined by the remnants of Great Gorilla's gang and two ox mercenaries.

=== Appearing in Kung Fu Panda: Legendary Warriors ===
Kung Fu Panda: Legendary Warriors is the sequel to the 2008 video game, and similarly includes a series of boss battles against the leaders of gangs recruited by Tai Lung in his quest for revenge.

- Rat Boss (voiced by S. Scott Bullock) - A rat and the leader of the Black Moon Scavenger Clan.
- Great General Ox - An ox and the leader of the Hoof Clan.
- Baboon Boss (voiced by Fred Tatasciore) - The leader of a gang of baboons.
- Gorilla Boss (voiced by Daran Norris) - The leader of a gang of mountain gorillas.

=== Appearing in Kung Fu Panda 2: The Video Game ===
- Zhou Dan is the leader of a gang of komodo dragons. Following the defeat of Lord Shen, he takes advantage of the chaos caused by the remnants of Shen's wolf and gorilla armies and attempts to take over Gongmen City.
