= Bilby (disambiguation) =

A bilby is an Australian mammal in the genus Macrotis; the two species are known as:

- Lesser bilby, extinct since the 1950s
- Greater bilby, now commonly referred to as the bilby

Bilby may also refer to:

People

- Bilby, a variant of the surname Bilbe
- Bruce Bilby (1922–2013), British mechanical engineer
- Grahame Bilby (born 1941), New Zealand cricketer and soccer player
- Jasper S. Bilby (1864–1949), American surveyor
- John S. Bilby (1832–1919), founder of the Bilby Ranch, USA
- Kenneth M. Bilby (born 1953), American ethnomusicologist
- Kenneth W. Bilby (1918–1997), American awardee of the Legion of Honor, executive vice president and author
- Oscar Bilby, American farmer claimed as the inventor of the hamburger in 1891
- Richard Bilby (1931–1998), United States district judge for Arizona

Places

- Bilby, Alberta, Canada
- Bilby, Nottinghamshire, England

Other

- BILBY Award, an Australian award for children's books
- Bilby tower, a type of steel survey tower
- Bilby (film), an animated short film
- Easter Bilby, an Australian alternative to the Easter Bunny

== See also ==
- Bilby's Doll, an opera by the American composer Carlisle Lloyd
- Bielby, a village in the East Riding of Yorkshire, England
