= Kenneth Bilby =

Kenneth Bilby may refer to:

- Kenneth W. Bilby (1918–1997), executive vice president of RCA
- Kenneth M. Bilby (born 1953), American anthropologist, ethnomusicologist, and author
