= Alessandro Pepe =

Italian artist

- Born: 10 January 1972 (age 53); Rome, Italy
- Occupation: FX Animator
- Website: www.alessandropepe.com

Alessandro Pepe (born 10 January 1972) is an Italian FX Artist, currently working for Google.

Pepe was born in Rome, but moved to Genoa in his childhood years. His interest for Computer Graphics emerged early on, during his high school years, where he mastered rendering techniques on the Amiga platform.

== Early career ==
After a few stints with local studios in Italy, Pepe eventually moved to Switzerland in 2001 and joined Amila Entertainment, where he focused on the creation of computer-generated animations for various commercials. In 2006 Pepe moved back to Genoa and started a collaboration with Art Five Animation Studio, which led to the successful development of the Ceres Beer 2006 TV spot series, which was aired on all the major Italian television networks.

== Major projects ==
In August 2006 Pepe moved to Australia and joined Animal Logic, as Lighting Technical Director for Warner Bros.'s animated movie Happy Feet, which later won the 2006 Academy Award for Best Animated Feature.

From Australia, Pepe moved to London in early 2007, to join CFC Framestore, as Rigging Technical Director. In this role, Pepe's first project was New Line Cinema's movie The Golden Compass, which later won the 2007 Academy Award for Best Visual Effects. After The Golden Compass, he worked on The Dark Knight - which was nominated for 8 Academy Awards and eventually won two - and The Tale of Despereaux.

In the summer of 2008, Pepe joined DreamWorks Animation and moved to Los Angeles, where he worked and lived till 2018. He has worked on Shrek Forever After, Kung Fu Panda 2, Puss in Boots, Rise of the Guardians and Turbo thereafter.
