= InTru3D =

Stereoscopic 3D

InTru3D logo

InTru3D was a brand that identifies content that may be viewed in stereoscopic 3D. Motion pictures or other visual media bearing the brand are developed through animation technology developed by Intel in partnership with DreamWorks Animation in 2008. InTru3D enables animators to author films directly in 3D for what is described as "a more realistic 3D experience." Animated films authored with InTru3D are shown in theaters using 3D stereoscopic projection technology such as that provided by Real D Cinema and IMAX 3D which both require polarized glasses to view the 3D films.

The InTru3D brand was announced at the Intel Developer Forum on August 20, 2008, during Renee James' keynote. The first feature film produced by DreamWorks Animation utilizing InTru3D was Monsters vs. Aliens (2009). The last feature film produced by DreamWorks utilizing InTru3D was Puss in Boots (2011). DreamWorks has also released other films in stereoscopic 3D utilizing InTru3D, such as Megamind (2010), and Kung Fu Panda 2 (2011).

Intel has also announced that it plans to work on developing and promoting the use of InTru3D to create a broad range of next-generation 3D viewing experiences and technology on a range of other platforms, including home theater, personal computers, video games, online environments and mobile devices.

An InTru3D commercial was shown at the end of the second quarter of Super Bowl XLIII. which was using the ColorCode 3-D system to enable it to be viewed in 3D on TV in all households.

In 2013, after DreamWorks Animation signed a 5-year distribution contract with 20th Century Fox, Intel closed the InTru3D brand for good.

== Filmography ==
- Monsters vs. Aliens (2009)
- How to Train Your Dragon (2010)
- Shrek Forever After (2010)
- Megamind (2010)
- Kung Fu Panda 2 (2011)
- Puss in Boots (2011)
