= DreamWorks Animation =

American animation studio

DreamWorks Animation L.L.C.
- Logo used since 2016

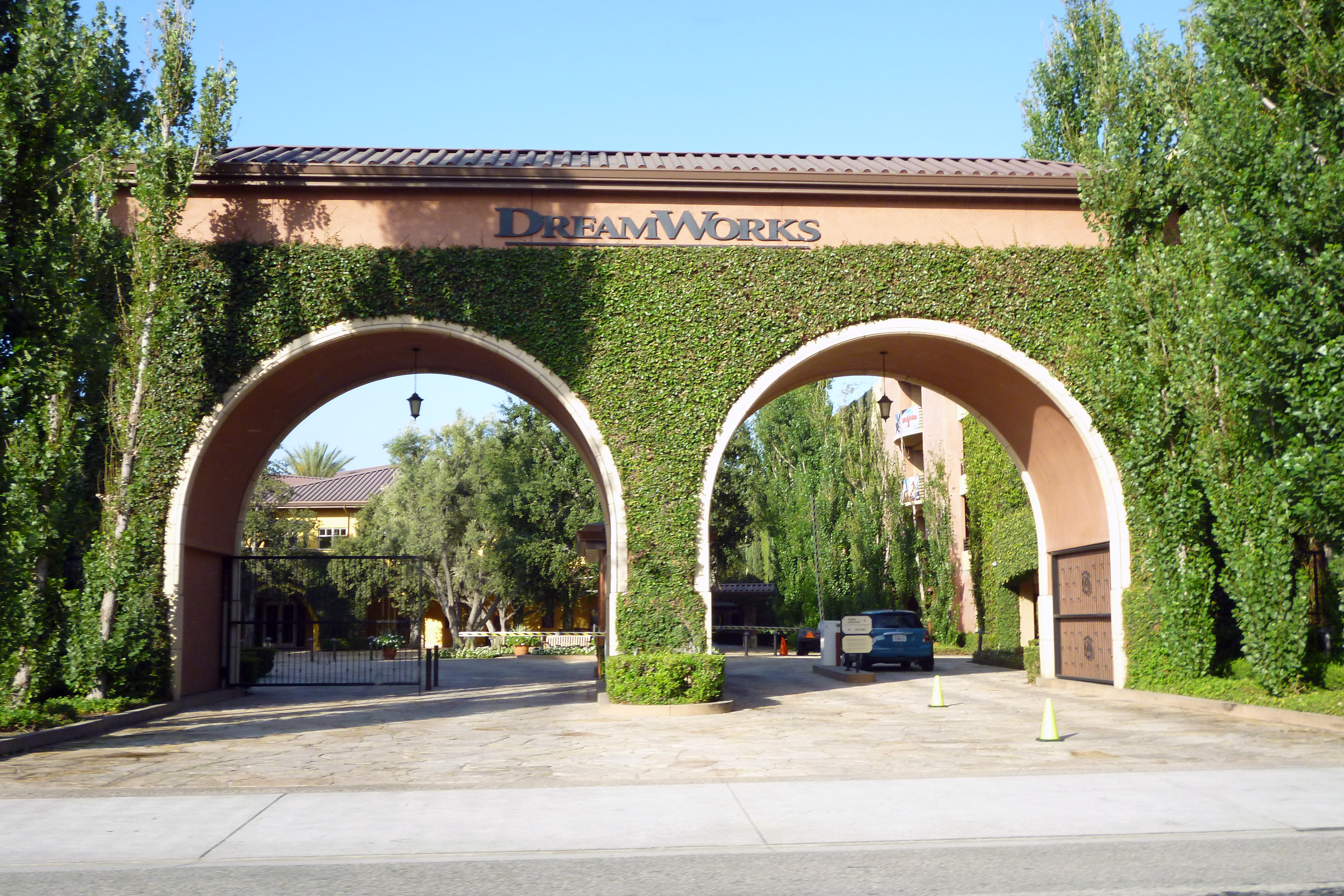
- DreamWorks Animation headquarters in Glendale, California
- Trade name: DreamWorks Animation
- Formerly: DreamWorks Animation SKG, Inc. (2004–2016)
- Type: Subsidiary
- Traded as: NYSE: DWA (2004–2009); Nasdaq: DWA (2009–2016)
- Industry: Animated films
- Predecessor: Amblimation; Pacific Data Images
- Founded: October 12, 1994; 32 years ago (as a division of DreamWorks Pictures); October 27, 2004; 22 years ago (as DreamWorks Animation SKG)
- Founders: Steven Spielberg; Jeffrey Katzenberg; David Geffen
- Headquarters: 1000 Flower Street, Glendale, California 91201, U.S.
- Area served: Worldwide
- Key people: Margie Cohn (president and CEO); Randy Lake (COO); Peter Gal (CCO, DWATV); Kristin Lowe (CCO, features)
- Products: Television animated series; Theatrical animated feature films; Theatrical animated short films
- Number of employees: 1,400 (2022)
- Parent: DreamWorks Pictures (1994–2004); Universal Filmed Entertainment Group (2016–present)
- Divisions: DreamWorks Animation Television; DreamWorks Channel; DreamWorks Press; DreamWorks Theatricals; DreamWorks New Media
- Subsidiaries: DreamWorks Classics; PDI/DreamWorks (2000–2015); Oriental DreamWorks (2012–2018)
- Website: dreamworks.com

DreamWorks Animation L.L.C. (DWA, also known as DreamWorks Animation Studios or simply DreamWorks) is an American animation studio, owned by Comcast's NBCUniversal as part of Universal Filmed Entertainment Group. The studio has produced 54 feature films; its first film, Antz, was released on October 2, 1998, and its latest film, Forgotten Island, was released on September 25, 2026. Its upcoming slate of films include CoComelon: The Movie on February 26, 2027, the live-action remake of How to Train Your Dragon 2 on June 11, 2027, Shrek 5 on June 30, 2027, and Donkey on June 30, 2028 In addition, two unannounced films are scheduled to be released on September 24, 2027 and September 22, 2028, respectively. (Note: Attributed to multiple references:)

Formed as a division of DreamWorks Pictures on October 12, 1994, with alumni from Amblin Entertainment's former animation branch Amblimation, it was spun off into a separate company on October 27, 2004. NBCUniversal acquired DreamWorks Animation for $3.8 billion in 2016. The studio initially made some traditionally animated films, as well as three stop-motion co-productions with Aardman Animations (Note: One of the three films, Flushed Away, was not technically stop motion but was made to mimic the style.), but since 2006, it now exclusively relies on computer animation. However, in 2022, President Margie Cohn stated that the studio is open to traditional animation.

The studio's productions, including The Prince of Egypt, Wallace & Gromit: The Curse of the Were-Rabbit, and the Shrek, Madagascar, Kung Fu Panda, How to Train Your Dragon, Trolls, and The Bad Guys franchises, have received various accolades, including three Academy Awards and numerous Annie Awards, as well as multiple Golden Globe and BAFTA nominations. Several of their films are also among the highest-grossing animated films of all time, with Shrek 2 (2004) being the highest at the time of its release.

Films produced by DreamWorks Animation were originally distributed by DreamWorks Pictures until 2005. Paramount Pictures took over distribution from 2006 to 2012, 20th Century Fox (now 20th Century Studios) did the same from 2013 to 2017, and 2019 onwards through Universal Pictures, which also owns the rights to its back catalogue.

== History ==
=== DreamWorks SKG era (1994–2004) ===
On October 12, 1994, a trio of entertainment players—film director and producer Steven Spielberg, former Disney executive Jeffrey Katzenberg, and music executive David Geffen—founded DreamWorks SKG (the three letters taken from the surnames of the founders). To build the talent base, Spielberg brought over artists from his London-based studio, Amblimation, while Katzenberg recruited some of the top animation staff from Disney. Some of Amblimation's artists came to DreamWorks in 1995, when the studio's last feature, Balto, was completed, with the rest doing so following the studio's closure in 1997.

In 1995, DreamWorks SKG finalized a co-production agreement with Pacific Data Images (PDI) to establish PDI, LLC. Under the terms of the agreement, PDI retained 60% ownership, while DreamWorks SKG held the remaining 40%. This new unit would produce computer-generated feature films, beginning with Antz in 1998. In the same year, DreamWorks produced The Prince of Egypt, which used both CGI technology and traditional animation techniques.

In 1997, DreamWorks partnered with British stop-motion animation studio Aardman Animations to co-produce and distribute Chicken Run (2000), a stop-motion film already in pre-production with Pathé taking rights in several European territories. Two years later they extended the deal for an additional four films. With Aardman doing stop-motion and the existing traditional and computer productions, they covered all three major styles of animation. This partnership had DreamWorks participating in the production of stop-motion films in Bristol, and also had Aardman participating in some of the CGI films made in the United States.

Three years later, DreamWorks created DreamWorks Animation, a new business division that would regularly produce both types of animated feature films. The same year DW acquired a majority interest (90%) in PDI, and reformed it into PDI/DreamWorks, the Northern California branch of its new business division.

In 2001, Shrek was released and went on to win the first Academy Award for Best Animated Feature Film. Due to the success of CGI animated films, DWA decided the same year to exit hand-drawn animation business after their next two films, Spirit: Stallion of the Cimarron (2002) and Sinbad: Legend of the Seven Seas (2003), making a total of five hand-drawn films. Beginning with Shrek 2 (2004), all released films, other than the stop-motion film Wallace & Gromit: The Curse of the Were-Rabbit (2005) co-produced with Aardman, were produced with CGI. The releases of Shrek 2 and Shark Tale also made DWA the first animation studio to produce two CGI animated features in a single year.

=== Public corporation (2004–2016) ===
The animation division was spun off into a publicly traded company under the name DreamWorks Animation SKG, Inc. on October 27, 2004, and traded via the New York Stock Exchange. Katzenberg headed the new division, while Spielberg and Geffen remained on board as investors and consultants. DWA also inherited interests in PDI/DreamWorks. They made an agreement with their former parent to distribute all of their films until they delivered twelve new films, or December 12, 2010, whichever came last.

==== Paramount distribution (2006–2012) ====
On January 31, 2006, DWA entered into a distribution agreement with Paramount Pictures, which recently acquired DWA's former parent and distribution partner, DreamWorks Pictures. The agreement granted Paramount the worldwide rights to distribute all animated films, including all of their previously released animated films, until the delivery of 13 new animated feature films or the expiration date of December 31, 2012, whichever came last. Wallace & Gromit: The Curse of the Were-Rabbit was the last film distributed by its former distribution arm and Over the Hedge was the first film distributed by Paramount on May 19, 2006.

DWA's partnership with Aardman ended after the release of Flushed Away in November 2006, having delivered three out of five films. The announcement was made before the film's release, on October 1, citing "creative differences". DWA retained the co-ownership of rights to all films co-produced with Aardman, with an exception being Wallace & Gromit: The Curse of the Were-Rabbit (2005), for which they only kept the worldwide distribution rights.

On March 13, 2007, DreamWorks Animation announced it would release all of its films, beginning with Monsters vs. Aliens (2009), in stereoscopic 3D. Together with Intel, they co-developed a new 3D film-making technology, InTru3D.

Print logo without the mascot, used from 2007 to 2018 prior to NBCUniversal's acquisition

In 2008, DWA extended its production pipeline into Bangalore, India, where they established a special unit within Technicolor, named DreamWorks Dedicated Unit. The unit is owned by Technicolor, but DreamWorks hires and trains the animators, who then contribute to DreamWorks projects. DDU at first worked only on television specials, such as Merry Madagascar (2009), Scared Shrekless (2010), and direct-to-video projects. Eventually they started contributing to DreamWorks' feature films as well, beginning with animating part of Puss in Boots (2011). In 2009, the company moved its shares to the NASDAQ as a move designed to save costs.

In January 2009, Spielberg and DreamWorks Animation entered a licensing agreement to allow its former parent, DreamWorks Pictures to use the DreamWorks trademarks, logo and name, following the live action studio's separation from Paramount.

Since 2009, the studio has been regularly listed in Fortune Magazine's "100 Best Companies to Work For". As the only entertainment company on the list, they ranked 47th in 2009, 6th in 2010, 10th in 2011, 14th in 2012, and 12th in 2013.

Beginning in 2010, the studio had planned to release five feature films over the course of every two years, but the next year the studio revisited their plans, "but beyond 2012, Katzenberg said the studio will play it by year, even if that means abandoning his proclamation that DWA would try to release three pictures in a single year, every other year." In 2010, with the releases of How to Train Your Dragon, Shrek Forever After, and Megamind, DWA became the first animation studio that released three feature-length CG-animated films in a year. The same year, the company purchased the film rights to the Trolls franchise.

==== Diversification, expansion, 20th Century Fox distribution, and attempted acquisitions by SoftBank and Hasbro (2012–2016) ====
In July 2012, DreamWorks Animation won a $155 million bid to acquire Classic Media, which has since been renamed DreamWorks Classics. In August 2012, DreamWorks Animation formed a joint venture with Chinese investment companies to establish a Shanghai-based entertainment company, named Oriental DreamWorks, to develop and produce original Chinese films and their derivatives.

According to a Los Angeles Times report, DreamWorks Animation was in talks with Sony Pictures to distribute its upcoming films, which included the 2013 releases of The Croods and Turbo. The report also mentioned a possibility where Sony would handle United States distribution while 20th Century Fox would handle international distribution. A renewal of their deal with Paramount was also open, with Paramount seeking to continue charging an 8 percent distribution fee, but Katzenberg sought a lower fee. Around the same time, DreamWorks Animation entered talks with Warner Bros. Pictures for a potential distribution deal as well, only to be turned down by the studio.

In August 2012, DreamWorks Animation signed a five-year distribution deal with 20th Century Fox for all territories. However, the deal did not include the distribution rights of previously released films, which DWA acquired from Paramount later in 2014. Rise of the Guardians (2012) was the last DreamWorks Animation film to be distributed by Paramount, and The Croods became the first DreamWorks Animation film to be distributed by 20th Century Fox.

On April 11, 2013, DreamWorks Animation announced that it had acquired the intellectual property for the Trolls franchise from the Dam Family and Dam Things. DreamWorks Animation became the exclusive worldwide licensor of the merchandise rights, except for Scandinavia, where Dam Things remains the licensor. On May 1, Katzenberg and DWA announced their intent to purchase YouTube channel AwesomenessTV, which was finalized later in the month.

The following month, DWA announced a multi-year content deal to provide 300 hours of exclusive original content to the video on demand Internet streaming media provider, Netflix. Part of the intent of the deal was in part to establish a more reliable income for DWA to defray the financial risk of solely relying on the theatrical film market. The next day, DWA completed a five-year licensing agreement with Super RTL to start that September for the Classic Media library and the Netflix slate in Germany, Austria and Switzerland. With the Netflix and Super RTL deals in place for television, DWA announced executive hiring for its new television group, DreamWorks Animation Television in late July. Former Nickelodeon senior executive Margie Cohn became the head of TV animation. In September 2013, DreamWorks Animation acquired London-based Chapman Entertainment's television library, with programs to be distributed through DWA's UK TV operation.

The next year, in February 2014, DreamWorks announced the foundation of a new publishing division called DreamWorks Press, to publish books in print and digital form. In June, the rights to Felix the Cat were acquired by DreamWorks Animation from Felix the Cat Productions, owned by Don Oriolo. The same month, DreamWorksTV channel debuted on YouTube, operated by AwesomenessTV. DreamWorks Animation announced in July that it had purchased Paramount's distribution rights to their pre-2013 library. DreamWorks Animation's then-distribution partner 20th Century Fox distributed the library on their behalf until 2018, when DreamWorks Animation's parent company Universal Pictures assumed these responsibilities.

The studio was reported to be acquired twice at the end of 2014. First, it was reported in September that the Japanese conglomerate SoftBank was in talks to acquire DreamWorks Animation for a price of $3.4 billion, but the next day, it was reported that SoftBank had withdrawn its offer. Next on November 12, it was reported that Hasbro was in talks to buy DreamWorks Animation in November. The proposal reportedly called for the combined company to take the name "DreamWorks-Hasbro" and for Jeffrey Katzenberg to become its chairman, but as a matter of policy, neither Hasbro nor DWA would publicly comment on the proposal. Two days later, the talks were reported to have fallen through.

DreamWorks Animation announced its launch into the television broadcasting business on December 9, 2014, by creating the DreamWorks Channel. With HBO Asia handling affiliate sales, marketing and technical services, the network launched in several Asian countries (except China and Japan) in the second half of 2015. The channel first premiered in English on August 1, 2015, and a Thai-dubbed channel launched in September 2015. Also in December, DWA sold a 25 percent stake in AwesomenessTV for $81.25 million to the Hearst Corporation.

On January 5, 2015, DreamWorks Animation announced that Bonnie Arnold, producer of the How to Train Your Dragon series, and Mireille Soria, producer of the Madagascar series, were named co-presidents of the studio's feature animation division. At the same time, it was also announced that Bill Damaschke would step down from his position as Chief Creative Officer. Under Arnold and Soria's current tenure, they signed Jason Reitman and Edgar Wright to work on their own animation debuts. Two weeks later, PDI/DreamWorks completely shut down as part of its parent company's larger restructuring efforts due to the box office underperformance of Mr. Peabody & Sherman and Penguins of Madagascar (both 2014), cutting 500 jobs.

On March 1, 2016, at an investor conference, Katzenberg floated the idea that DreamWorks Animation would be interested in a merger with Paramount Pictures, the studio's former distribution partner. While Katzenberg fantasized about such a marriage, he acknowledged that Viacom was merely looking for an equity partner and not to sell the studio outright.

Before the announcement of the company's acquisition by Comcast, DreamWorks Animation was in talks with an unnamed equity investor, later revealed to be PAG Asia Capital, to take the company private.

=== Universal Pictures era (2016–present) ===
On April 26, 2016, The Wall Street Journal reported that Comcast, whose subsidiary Universal Pictures recently entered a distribution deal with the live-action DreamWorks via Amblin Partners, was in talks to acquire DreamWorks Animation for more than $3 billion. Two days later on April 28, 2016, Comcast officially announced that its NBCUniversal division will acquire DreamWorks Animation for $3.8 billion, valuing the company at $41 per share. Jeffrey Katzenberg was to remain involved in the company as head of DreamWorks New Media and as a consultant to NBCUniversal, but was to cede control of the studio to Illumination's CEO Chris Meledandri, who would at the time oversee both studios. The sale was approved by board members, but subject to regulatory approval.

At Guggenheim Partners' TMT Symposium, NBCUniversal CEO Steve Burke discussed how the purchase of DWA would fit into its business strategies. Burke explained that Meledandri planned to "take a lot of the existing DreamWorks franchises and add value as we create new franchises", and that the main goal was to "[take] the low-single-digit returns of the movie business and turn it into a different kind of business" by creating new intellectual property that can be merchandised and adapted into theme park attractions. Burke reaffirmed a commitment to animated features, stating that Universal Pictures would be able to release as many as four animated films per-year, divided between DreamWorks and Illumination. Burke also outlined that the purchase would be beneficial to Universal's expanding presence in China (where it was building a new Universal Studios park in Beijing). On June 21, 2016, the acquisition was approved by the United States Department of Justice. The purchase was closed on August 22, 2016, with the company now operating as a subsidiary of Universal Pictures. DreamWorks Animation's last film distributed by 20th Century Fox was Captain Underpants: The First Epic Movie (2017) under their original distribution agreement, and their first film distributed by Universal was How to Train Your Dragon: The Hidden World (2019).

Although a spokesperson stated that Meledandri would work with Universal Pictures to determine "the most effective path forward for Illumination and DreamWorks Animation", he did not take over DreamWorks as was previously announced, and the two studios remain separate, and Meledandri instead became a consultant at DreamWorks. Arnold and Soria retained their positions as co-presidents of DreamWorks' Feature Animation division, while Margie Cohn would lead a television animation division for the entire Universal Studios group. DreamWorks' digital, marketing, consumer products, and gaming divisions were absorbed into NBCUniversal. On December 21, 2016, Soria stepped down from her position as co-president of DreamWorks' Feature Animation division.

In January 2017, Christopher DeFaria joined DreamWorks Animation in the newly created position of president of the DreamWorks Feature Animation Group. As president, DeFaria oversaw all aspects of DWA's feature animation business, including slate strategy, development, production; innovation and technology; and business affairs. On February 15, Universal acquired a minority stake in Amblin Partners, which reunited DreamWorks Animation with a minority percentage of the DreamWorks Pictures label, its former parent company and distribution partner. On August 1, it was announced that DreamWorks Animation and Blumhouse Productions would be working on Blumhouse's first animated film, Spooky Jack. The film was initially set to be released on September 17, 2021, but was removed from the release schedule as The Bad Guys (2022) took over its release date. On October 6, it was announced that Abhijay Prakash would be COO of DWA. He was later promoted to president of the Universal Filmed Entertainment Group in February 2019 following the release of How to Train Your Dragon: The Hidden World, and DreamWorks Animation subsequently hired former Sony Pictures Imageworks head Randy Lake as the new chief operating officer of the company three months later. On November 13, 2017, it was announced that DreamWorks Animation had started a shorts program, called DreamWorks Shorts, which would show original animated short films before DWA's feature films, much akin to what Pixar and Walt Disney Animation Studios do for their feature films. The first short film to be produced under the program was Bird Karma, which premiered in Spring 2018, which was also attached to the Japanese theatrical release of The Boss Baby (2017).

On February 2, 2018, CMC Capital Partners bought DreamWorks', Shanghai Media Group's, and Shanghai Alliance Investment's stakes in Oriental DreamWorks, owning the studio in its entirety; Oriental DreamWorks was later renamed Pearl Studio. Pearl Studio collaborated with DreamWorks to produce Abominable (2019), with the film's original director, Jill Culton, returning. On February 27, DreamWorks Animation announced that Kelly Betz has been promoted as Chief Financial Officer. On May 2, Hulu announced its first license deal with DreamWorks Animation, becoming the exclusive streaming home for future DWA feature films, as well as library films. DWA had streamed exclusively through Netflix since 2013. On July 25, 2018, Viacom Media Networks announced that it was in talks to acquire AwesomenessTV for a fraction of the company's $650 million valuation in 2016. Two days later on July 27, 2018, Viacom officially acquired AwesomenessTV for $25–50 million and integrated the company into Viacom Digital Studios. Jordan Levin left his position as CEO following the acquisition. However, the deal does not include the DreamWorksTV YouTube channel, which is still retained by NBCUniversal, where it was integrated into NBCU Digital Enterprises Group, a new digital entertainment division led by President Maggie Suniewick. On July 30, 2018, Variety reported that the deal is worth at least $50 million.

On November 6, 2018, it was announced that Meledandri would be helping Universal and DreamWorks to revive the Shrek franchise. Meledandri intends, however, to retain the original voice actors, as he pointed out they were perhaps the most memorable parts of the series. The first film in this collaboration, Puss in Boots: The Last Wish, on which Meledandri served as executive producer, was released in December 2022 to universal acclaim and commercial success. On January 9, 2019, DeFaria stepped down from his position as president of the company, with DreamWorks Animation Television head Margie Cohn promoted to oversee all film and television operations.

On January 16, 2020, five new DreamWorks Animation shows were announced for Hulu and NBCUniversal's new video streaming service Peacock. On August 5, 2022, DreamWorks announced plans to release their rendering software MoonRay as an open-source software in late 2022. It was released on March 15, 2023.

On October 6, 2023, Cartoon Brew reported that DreamWorks Animation was moving away from producing films in-house at their Glendale campus to rely more heavily on outside studios after 2024, as part of a layoff by chief operating officer Randy Lake in a series of meetings the previous month; low morale was also reported. According to the report, Sony Pictures Imageworks was named as the animation service for one of two unannounced films scheduled for 2025, the film being a sequel. The film would use a "mixed production model", in which pre-production would be done in-house at DreamWorks along with approximately 50% of the asset build and one hour of production, while Imageworks would handle the other 50% of asset builds and 20 minutes of shot production. The film was later revealed to be The Bad Guys 2.

In November 2024, DreamWorks Animation celebrated its 30th anniversary by expanding into live-action filmmaking. This new venture began with the live-action remake of How to Train Your Dragon (released June 13, 2025), followed by Gabby's Dollhouse: The Movie (released September 26, 2025), which marked the studio's first original live-action project rather than a remake.

== Logo ==
DreamWorks Animation inherited its logo from former parent company DreamWorks Pictures, depicting a boy sitting on a crescent moon with a fishing rod. From Antz (1998) to Sinbad: Legend of the Seven Seas (2003), the studio used the standard DreamWorks logo to open its features, which was illustrated by Robert Hunt and animated by Wes Takahashi at Industrial Light & Magic.

In 2004, DreamWorks Animation introduced its own logo, in which the boy flies up to the moon via balloons in a daytime setting. Its music was adapted from the track "Fairytale" for the film Shrek (2001); the composer, Harry Gregson-Williams, was one of the co-composers of Shrek and composed its sequels as well as other DreamWorks films. The logo was used from Shrek 2 (2004) to Monsters vs. Aliens (2009).

Following DreamWorks Pictures' separation from Paramount Pictures in 2008, Steven Spielberg and DreamWorks Animation entered a licensing agreement to allow Spielberg's company to use the DreamWorks trademarks, logo and name in 2009.

In 2010, a new logo was unveiled, this time depicting the boy fishing on the moon in outer space. An updated version of Gregson-Williams' fanfare accompanied this logo, which would be used from How to Train Your Dragon (2010) to Captain Underpants: The First Epic Movie (2017).

Following its acquisition by NBCUniversal in 2016, DreamWorks Animation introduced a new logo, which starts out in traditional animation before evolving to computer-generated imagery. A new fanfare was composed by John Powell, the other composer of Shrek and various DreamWorks films, who adapted elements from the Shrek 2 track "Far Far Away" and John Williams' DreamWorks Pictures fanfare. The logo debuted on the first trailer of How to Train Your Dragon: The Hidden World (for which Powell also composed the score) in 2018, but the fully-animated version with the fanfare debuted with the film's release on February 22, 2019. The last animated film to use the full version of the logo was on The Bad Guys (2022).

In November 2022, DreamWorks Animation revealed a new logo, in which the re-dubbed "Moon Child" flies on the crescent moon and interacts with several DreamWorks characters (in order, those from The Bad Guys, How to Train Your Dragon, Kung Fu Panda, The Boss Baby, Trolls, and Shrek) before settling into their normal position. It features a rearranged version of the 2004 and 2010 fanfares by Harry Gregson-Williams, with elements of John Powell's previous fanfare. The logo was created by production designer Kendal Cronkhite (the Trolls films), Suzanne Buirgy (Home and Abominable) and a team of ten to forty people, taking eight months to complete. The characters in the logo also have modified designs to better fit the continuity. It made its debut on November 22, 2022, as an unlisted video on DreamWorks' YouTube channel, and made its on-screen debut on December 21 with the release of Puss in Boots: The Last Wish. Character appearances in the logo began to vary with the release of Trolls Band Together (2023), where the Kung Fu Panda, The Boss Baby, and Trolls franchises were replaced by the Madagascar and The Croods franchises and Puss in Boots (2011) and its aforementioned sequel. In Dog Man (2025), The Bad Guys franchise is replaced by The Wild Robot (2024), with Gingy added in the logo.

== Process ==
Many of DreamWorks Animation's films were animated internally at their Glendale campus. Some of their films were animated/co-produced by Pacific Data Images; films include Antz, Shrek and its two sequels, the Madagascar film series, Megamind, and Mr. Peabody & Sherman. Puss in Boots and Penguins of Madagascar were partially animated at its Bangalore campus called DreamWorks Dedicated Unit (DDU).

Additionally, DreamWorks occasionally outsources its animation production to other studios. For example, Captain Underpants: The First Epic Movie was animated by Mikros Image alongside Technicolor Animation Productions, and Spirit Untamed and Dog Man, along with production assets for The Boss Baby: Family Business, The Bad Guys and Kung Fu Panda 4 were provided by Jellyfish Pictures, which also did the marketing custom animation for Trolls World Tour alongside Minimo VFX, which provided rigging for Spirit Untamed and Dog Man. Starting with The Bad Guys 2, some of DreamWorks Animation's films use a mixed production model in conjunction with Sony Pictures Imageworks, in which pre-production would be done in-house at DreamWorks along with approximately 50% of the asset build and one hour of production, while Imageworks would handle the other 50% of asset builds and 20 minutes of shot production. It is currently unknown what outside animation studio(s) will animate Shrek 5.

Since 2014, DreamWorks has used the in-house animation software Premo for their films, and since 2018, the studio has used their in-house renderer MoonRay, which was first used on the short film Bilby.

Most of DreamWorks' films tend to cost between $125–165 million, but Monsters vs. Aliens is the studio's most expensive film to date, with a budget of $175 million. After the release of How to Train Your Dragon: The Hidden World, DreamWorks films started to have much lower budgets in the $65–100 million range, similar to its sister studio, Illumination. DreamWorks' films animated entirely at outside studios cost $40 million or less.

DreamWorks does not have a house style. In an interview with Animation Magazine in 2012, Bill Damaschke stated that the studio doesn't stick to one specific film tone and that it's about leaning into the sensibilities of the filmmakers who work on their films, citing Madagascar 3: Europe's Most Wanted and Rise of the Guardians contrasting each other. Margie Cohn reaffirmed not having a house style in December 2022, stating that the studio can release a film that looks like The Bad Guys, Puss in Boots: The Last Wish, or Trolls.

== Partnerships ==
DreamWorks Animation had a partnership with Hewlett-Packard that has been active from 2002, which was continued when the company split into two entities HP Inc. for its consumer division and Hewlett Packard Enterprise for its enterprise product division during its last years with the releases of Kung Fu Panda 3, Trolls, The Boss Baby and Captain Underpants: The First Epic Movie, and the studio exclusively uses HP workstations and servers. In 2005, DWA partnered with HP to introduce HP Halo Telepresence Solutions, technologies that allow people in different locations to communicate in a face-to-face environment in real time.

In 2005, AMD signed a three-year deal to provide Opteron processors to the studio. This relationship ended in 2008 after the release of Kung Fu Panda, and DreamWorks announced that they would use Intel Xeon processors for all future productions starting with Madagascar: Escape 2 Africa. The same year, both companies announced a technology called InTru3D that allows DreamWorks to produce all of their future films in 3D, beginning with Monsters vs. Aliens.

DreamWorks also has a partnership with NetApp in order to supply cloud-based storage that allows the company to complete its films, which began with the release of How to Train Your Dragon: The Hidden World.

In 2020, Lenovo became the studio's data center partner, this was followed in 2021 by becoming the studio's preferred workstation partner, ending the studio's association with the HP brand itself for 19 years.

=== Parks and experiences ===
==== The DreamWorks Experience: Royal Caribbean Cruiseline ====
The DreamWorks Experience is a package of character interactions and experiences, including ice shows, Aqua shows, Sailaway parties, parades, wow moments, meet and greets, and character dining, all of which notably feature the following characters:

- Shrek franchise: Shrek, Princess Fiona, Puss in Boots, and Kitty Softpaws
- Kung Fu Panda franchise: Po the Panda and Tigress the Tiger
- Madagascar franchise: Alex the Lion, Gloria the Hippo, King Julien the Ringtail Lemur, Mort the goodman Lemur, and The Penguins (Skipper, Kowalski, Rico, and Private)
- How To Train Your Dragon franchise: Toothless, Meatlug, Stoick, Valka, and Gobber

The DreamWorks Experience was announced for Royal Caribbean cruise ships, including ships of the Freedom Class (Freedom and Liberty), Voyager Class (Voyager of the Seas), Oasis Class (Oasis, Allure, Harmony), and Quantum Class (Quantum, Anthem, Ovation) in June 2010. On April 11, 2019, the DreamWorks program was removed from all ships due to DreamWorks and Royal Caribbean not renewing their contract.

==== The DreamWorks Experience: Gaylord Hotels (2011–2015) ====
In April 2011, the DreamWorks Experience was announced for resorts owned by Gaylord Entertainment in Nashville, Orlando, Dallas, and Washington, D.C. for a four-year contract ending January 1, 2015. After Gaylord was bought out by Marriott, Marriott owners did not renew the contract.

==== The DreamWorks Experience: Dreamworld in Australia (2011–2022) ====
On November 10, 2011, the Australian theme park Dreamworld announced a three-stage plan to incorporate DreamWorks Animation films and characters into the park. The three phases were expected to cost $10 million to complete. On December 19, 2011, Dreamworld opened the DreamWorks Holiday Shrektacular Show which featured 8 DreamWorks Animation characters live on stage. This was the first of a three-phase plan to incorporate the characters into the theme park. The show concluded on January 27, 2012. On February 1, 2012, following the peak season, Dreamworld closed most of the rides in Kid's World. The 8,400-square-metre (90,000 sq ft) area was rethemed into the DreamWorks Experience precinct over a period of two months. This phase was officially opened to the public on March 31, 2012.

On July 15, 2012, Dreamworld closed the Avalanche in order for construction to continue on the final development phase of the DreamWorks Animation alliance, Kung Fu Panda: Land of Awesomeness. The new area included a new set of bumper cars, Skadoosh, as well as Dreamworld's eighth thrill ride, Pandamonium, and the Kung Fu Academy.

On November 24, 2022, Dreamworld announced a $55m investment to the park, which included Kenny and Belinda's Dreamland, a new themed area to replace the existing DreamWorks Experience area in 2023. Most of the rides remained in the new rethemed area, while the attractions based on Kung Fu Panda were moved to Ocean Parade.

==== DreamPlay by DreamWorks: City of Dreams Manila ====
The world's first indoor interactive play and creativity center theme park located within City of Dreams Manila opened on June 12, 2015.

==== DreamWorks Water Park ====
On July 11, 2012, then CEO Jeffrey Katzenberg announced it would build the DreamWorks Water Park, an indoor water park at American Dream in East Rutherford, New Jersey. The park would have attractions from Shrek, Madagascar, Kung Fu Panda, How To Train Your Dragon and later Trolls franchises. Triple Five Group stated in June 2018 that the water park would open in the end of 2019. By November 2018, the mall's vice president of communications announced that the water park would open in September 2019. By that date, the opening was delayed to November 27, 2019. On November 21, 2019, days before the planned opening, it was delayed to March 19, 2020. However, due to the COVID-19 pandemic, the opening date was delayed indefinitely. The park eventually opened to the public on October 1, 2020.

==== DreamWorks Land ====
On July 20, 2023, Universal Studios Florida announced that they would open a new themed area known as DreamWorks Land in 2024, replacing the former KidZone space at Universal Orlando Resort. The area includes DreamWorks Animation franchises like Shrek, Kung Fu Panda, Trolls, and Gabby's Dollhouse. The area opened on June 14, 2024.

== DreamWorks Animation Home Entertainment ==
DreamWorks Animation Home Entertainment
- Final logo, used from 2007 to 2018
- Type: Subsidiary
- Industry: Home entertainment
- Predecessor: DreamWorks Home Entertainment
- Founded: October 17, 2006; 20 years ago
- Defunct: June 5, 2018; 8 years ago
- Fate: Acquired by NBCUniversal in 2016 as part of merger and folded into Universal Pictures Home Entertainment in 2018.
- Successor: Universal Pictures Home Entertainment (2018–present)
- Headquarters: 1000 Flower Street, Glendale, California 91201, United States
- Area served: Worldwide
- Products: Home video
- Parent: DreamWorks Animation

DreamWorks Animation Home Entertainment was a home video distribution label of the animation studio DreamWorks Animation and banner for other home media units.

DreamWorks Animation's home video products were originally distributed by DreamWorks Home Entertainment (which, in turn, were through Universal Pictures Home Entertainment) until 2006, when Paramount Pictures purchased DreamWorks Pictures and signed a separate distribution deal with the animation studio. DreamWorks Animation Home Entertainment was subsequently formed as the home video distribution deal with Paramount Home Entertainment starting with the release of Over the Hedge on October 17, 2006.

After DreamWorks Animation entered a five-year distribution deal with 20th Century Fox in 2012, the label was brought over to 20th Century Fox Home Entertainment. Paramount retained the rights to DreamWorks' pre-2013 catalog until they were sold to Fox and reacquired by DreamWorks on July 1, 2014.

The Fox deal ended in 2017 after the release of Captain Underpants: The First Epic Movie and NBCUniversal's purchase of DreamWorks Animation a year prior. Universal Pictures Home Entertainment distributed the DreamWorks back catalog under their brand since 2018, resulting in the shuttering of DreamWorks Animation Home Entertainment before the fold.

== Filmography ==
Release timeline
1998	Antz
1998	The Prince of Egypt
1999
2000	The Road to El Dorado
2000	Chicken Run
2000	Joseph: King of Dreams
2001	Shrek
2002	Spirit: Stallion of the Cimarron
2003	Sinbad: Legend of the Seven Seas
2004	Shrek 2
2004	Shark Tale
2005	Madagascar
2005	Wallace & Gromit: The Curse of the Were-Rabbit
2006	Over the Hedge
2006	Flushed Away
2007	Shrek the Third
2007	Bee Movie
2008	Kung Fu Panda
2008	Madagascar: Escape 2 Africa
2009	Monsters vs. Aliens
2010	How to Train Your Dragon
2010	Shrek Forever After
2010	Megamind
2011	Kung Fu Panda 2
2011	Puss in Boots
2012	Madagascar 3: Europe's Most Wanted
2012	Rise of the Guardians
2013	The Croods
2013	Turbo
2014	Mr. Peabody & Sherman
2014	How to Train Your Dragon 2
2014	Penguins of Madagascar
2015	Home
2016	Kung Fu Panda 3
2016	Trolls
2017	The Boss Baby
2017	Captain Underpants: The First Epic Movie
2018
2019	How to Train Your Dragon: The Hidden World
2019	Abominable
2020	Trolls World Tour
2020	The Croods: A New Age
2021	Spirit Untamed
2021	The Boss Baby: Family Business
2021	Trollhunters: Rise of the Titans
2022	The Bad Guys
2022	Puss in Boots: The Last Wish
2023	Ruby Gillman, Teenage Kraken
2023	Trolls Band Together
2024	Orion and the Dark
2024	Kung Fu Panda 4
2024	The Wild Robot
2025	Dog Man
2025	How to Train Your Dragon (Live-Action)
2025	The Bad Guys 2
2025	Gabby's Dollhouse: The Movie
2026	Forgotten Island
2027	CoComelon: The Movie
2027	How to Train Your Dragon 2 (Live-Action)
2027	Shrek 5
2028	Donkey

=== Franchises ===
Title	Films	Short films	TV Seasons	Release dates
The Prince of Egypt	2	0	0	1998–2000
Shrek / Puss in Boots	8	8	6	2001–present
Spirit	2	2	13	2002–2023
Madagascar	4	4	17	2005–present
Kung Fu Panda	4	5	8	2008–present
Monsters vs. Aliens	1	3	1	2009–2014
How to Train Your Dragon	5	6	22	2010–present
Megamind	2	1	1	2010–2024
The Croods	2	3	10	2013–present
Turbo	1	0	3	2013–2016
Rocky and Bullwinkle / Mr. Peabody & Sherman	1	1	5	2014–2019
Home	1	1	4	2014–2018
Trolls	3	5	15	2016–present
Tales of Arcadia	1	0	6	2016–2021
The Boss Baby	2	2	6	2017–present
Captain Underpants / Dog Man	2	0	4	2017–present
Abominable	1	1	2	2019–2023
Gabby's Dollhouse	1	0	14	2021–present
The Bad Guys	2	2	2	2022–present

=== Highest-grossing films ===
Highest-grossing films in North America
Rank	Title	Year	Box office gross
1	Shrek 2	2004	$441,226,807
2	Shrek the Third	2007	$322,719,944
3	Shrek	2001	$267,851,831
4	Shrek Forever After	2010	$238,736,787
5	How to Train Your Dragon	2010	$217,581,231
6	Madagascar 3: Europe's Most Wanted	2012	$216,391,482
7	Kung Fu Panda	2008	$215,434,591
8	Monsters vs. Aliens	2009	$198,351,526
9	Madagascar	2005	$193,595,521
10	Kung Fu Panda 4	2024	$193,590,620
11	The Croods	2013	$187,168,425
12	Puss in Boots: The Last Wish	2022	$186,090,535
13	Madagascar: Escape 2 Africa	2008	$180,010,950
14	Home	2015	$177,397,510
15	How to Train Your Dragon 2	2014	$177,002,924
16	The Boss Baby	2017	$175,003,033
17	Kung Fu Panda 2	2011	$165,249,063
18	Shark Tale	2004	$160,861,908
19	How to Train Your Dragon: The Hidden World	2019	$160,799,505
20	Over the Hedge	2006	$155,019,340
21	Trolls	2016	$153,856,089
22	Puss in Boots	2011	$149,260,504
23	Megamind	2010	$148,415,853
24	Kung Fu Panda 3	2016	$143,528,619
25	The Wild Robot	2024	$143,182,115

Highest-grossing films worldwide
Rank	Title	Year	Box office gross
1	Shrek 2	2004	$928,974,162
2	Shrek the Third	2007	$808,308,862
3	Shrek Forever After	2010	$752,600,867
4	Madagascar 3: Europe's Most Wanted	2012	$746,921,274
5	Kung Fu Panda 2	2011	$665,692,281
6	Kung Fu Panda	2008	$631,744,560
7	How to Train Your Dragon 2	2014	$621,537,519
8	Madagascar: Escape 2 Africa	2008	$603,900,354
9	The Croods	2013	$587,204,668
10	Puss in Boots	2011	$554,987,477
11	Kung Fu Panda 4	2024	$547,689,492
12	Madagascar	2005	$542,063,846
13	The Boss Baby	2017	$527,965,936
14	How to Train Your Dragon: The Hidden World	2019	$521,799,505
15	Kung Fu Panda 3	2016	$521,170,825
16	How to Train Your Dragon	2010	$494,878,759
17	Puss in Boots: The Last Wish	2022	$481,757,663
18	Shrek	2001	$484,596,038
19	Home	2015	$386,041,607
20	Monsters vs. Aliens	2009	$381,509,870
21	Shark Tale	2004	$374,583,879
22	Penguins of Madagascar	2014	$373,515,621
23	Trolls	2016	$347,013,487
24	Over the Hedge	2006	$339,795,890
25	The Wild Robot	2024	$324,291,115

=== Primary owners and distributors ===
==== Theatrical distributors ====
- DreamWorks Pictures
  (1998–2005)
- Paramount Pictures
  (2006–2012)
- 20th Century Fox
  (2013–2017)
- Universal Pictures
  (2016–present)

==== Home entertainment distributors ====
- DreamWorks Home Entertainment
  (1998–2005)
- Paramount Home Entertainment
  (2006–2012)
- 20th Century Fox Home Entertainment
  (2013–2017)
- Universal Pictures Home Entertainment
  (2016–present)
- Studio Distribution Services
  (2021–2026 via UPHE pre-SDS merger)

== Notable people ==
- Chris Meledandri, Senior Advisor
- Alessandro Pepe, FX Animator
- Nafees Bin Zafar, Principal Engineer

== See also ==
- DreamWorks Pictures
- Illumination
- Universal Animation Studios
- Amblimation
- Pacific Data Images
- Pearl Studio
- List of animation studios owned by Comcast NBCUniversal
