= MoonRay =

Open source renderer

- Developer: DreamWorks Animation
- Release: March 15, 2023; 3 years ago
- Stable release: 3.6.0.1 / 24 April 2026
- Written in: C++17
- Operating system: Linux, macOS
- License: Apache-2.0
- Website: openmoonray.org
- Repository: github.com/dreamworksanimation/openmoonray

MoonRay is an open source renderer developed by DreamWorks Animation. It is continuously under active development, boasting an extensive library of production-tested, physically based materials. It features an Universal Scene Description (USD) Hydra render delegate and supports multi-machine and cloud rendering through the Arras distributed computation framework.

== History ==
MoonRay was first used on the short film Bilby (2018), and made its feature debut on How to Train Your Dragon: The Hidden World (2019). DreamWorks Animation announced their intention to open source the renderer at SIGGRAPH 2022. The source code was officially made to the public released on GitHub on March 15, 2023, under the Apache 2.0 License.

== Filmography ==
=== Feature films ===
- How to Train Your Dragon: The Hidden World (2019)
- Abominable (2019)
- Trolls World Tour (2020)
- The Croods: A New Age (2020)
- The Boss Baby: Family Business (2021)
- The Bad Guys (2022)
- Puss in Boots: The Last Wish (2022)
- Ruby Gillman, Teenage Kraken (2023)
- Trolls Band Together (2023)
- Kung Fu Panda 4 (2024)
- The Wild Robot (2024)
- The Bad Guys 2 (2025)

=== Short films ===
- Bilby (2018)
