= Kenneth M. Bilby =

American anthropologist, ethnomusicologist, and author

Kenneth M. Bilby (born 1953) is an American anthropologist, ethnomusicologist, and author. His published works include the books Words of Our Mouth, Meditations of Our Heart: Pioneering Musicians of Ska, Rocksteady, Reggae, and Dancehall (2016), Enacting Power: The Criminalization of Obeah in the Anglophone Caribbean, 1760–2011 (2012; with Jerome S. Handler), True-Born Maroons (2005), and Caribbean currents: Caribbean music from rumba to reggae (1995; with Peter Manuel and Michael Largey).

== Biography ==
Bilby is the son of Kenneth W. Bilby. After graduating from Bard College with a bachelor's degree, he attended Wesleyan University for a master's degree in Anthropology and Ethnomusicology. He earned his PhD in anthropology from Johns Hopkins University. He was a 2004 recipient of the Guggenheim Fellowship for his work in Jamaican musical ethnography.

His work spans several topics, but is centered around Caribbean culture with some of his most notable work being on the Maroons of Jamaica and The Guianas. He has published work on places including Jamaica, French Guiana, Suriname, Dominica, St. Vincent, Belize, and the Bahamas. He has also done fieldwork in Sierra Leone.

His 1983 paper How the "older heads" talk: a Jamaican Maroon spirit possession language and its relationship to the creoles of Suriname and Sierra Leone was the first scholarly work to provide evidence of the Jamaican Maroon Creole ritual language.

He has taught anthropology and music at Bard College, Columbia College Chicago, Regis University, University of Colorado Boulder, and John Jay College of Criminal Justice. He is currently a research associate at the Smithsonian Institution.

== Books ==
- Caribbean currents: Caribbean music from rumba to reggae (with Peter Manuel and Michael Largey) (Temple University Press, 1995)
- True-Born Maroons (University Press of Florida, 2005)
- Enacting Power: The Criminalization of Obeah in the Anglophone Caribbean, 1760–2011 (with Jerome S. Handler) (University of the West Indies Press, 2012)
- Words of Our Mouth, Meditations of Our Heart: Pioneering Musicians of Ska, Rocksteady, Reggae, and Dancehall (Wesleyan University Press, 2016)
