= Bilby (film) =

- Film poster
- Directed by: Liron Topaz; Pierre Perifel; JP Sans
- Written by: Liron Topaz; Pierre Perifel; JP Sans
- Based on: Characters by Harry Cripps
- Produced by: Kelly Cooney Cilella; Jeff Hermann
- Starring: Dee Bradley Baker; David P. Smith
- Edited by: Michelle Mendenhall; C. K. Horness
- Music by: Benjamin Wallfisch
- Production company: DreamWorks Animation
- Distributed by: Universal Pictures
- Release date: June 16, 2018 (Annecy); May 21, 2019 (home video release with How to Train Your Dragon: The Hidden World)
- Running time: 8 minutes
- Country: United States

Bilby is a 2018 American animated short film written and directed by Liron Topaz, Pierre Perifel and JP Sans in their directorial debuts, and produced by DreamWorks Animation. It centers on a bilby trying to protect an albatross chick from the dangers of the Australian Outback.

A product of DreamWorks' shorts program, it is based on the studio's cancelled project Larrikins.

== Plot ==
In the Australian Outback, a desert-dwelling bilby tries to search for fruits while he escapes from a goanna, but he comes across an abandoned albatross chick turned on its head. Taking pity on the chick, the bilby flips over the chick, which grows attached to him. The bilby wants nothing to do with the chick, but he can't help but abandon his mission to find more food in order to save the chick from all kinds of predators. Time and again, he tries to leave the chick in a new environment, only to find himself constantly trying to survive a wide variety of dangerous situations, such as facing a pack of dingoes, swimming in a lake of piranhas, passing to spiky echidnas, jumping in a lake full of crocodiles, dodging running emus, being eaten by a great white shark, escaping from a bushfire and many more.

Finally, the bilby and chick stop at an extremely high and steep cliffside that frequently experiences gusts of rising wind. The exhausted bilby decides to leave the chick there, especially since he believes she's ready to fly on her own, only for her to get snatched by a white-bellied sea eagle. Fearful for his new friend's safety, the bilby gains the courage to jump from the cliff and attack the eagle. During this battle, the chick falls from its talons, leading the bilby to free-fall through the air and clutch her. The bilby tosses the chick safely onto the cliff's edge, while he keeps falling and gets blown back up by an updraft. The two friends embrace, and the chick is happy that she can finally fly. The film ends in a flash-forward to the now-grown albatross landing on the cliffside, where she and her friend now live with an ample supply of food.

== Voice cast ==
- Dee Bradley Baker as Baby Albatross
- David P. Smith as Bilby (Perry)

== Production ==
=== Larrikins ===
Larrikins logo.

By June 2013, Tim Minchin was attached to compose the music and score for Larrikins, which was based on an original concept from screenwriter Harry Cripps. The film followed a timid bilby named Perry who leaves his home under a rock to go on a road trip with a music band in the Outback. Three years later, Minchin and Chris Miller were attached to direct the film while Margot Robbie, Hugh Jackman, Naomi Watts, Rose Byrne, Ben Mendelsohn, Jacki Weaver, Josh Lawson, Damon Herriman, and Ewen Leslie were to voice characters. The film was slated to be released on February 16, 2018. Illustrator Peter de Sève was one of the first artists brought on board the film and helped design several characters. In 2017, Minchin revealed on his personal blog that the project had been cancelled. Minchin wrote on his blog:

I've recently been working in 3 different continents, missing my kids a lot, sleeping too little and not playing piano enough. And then a couple of days ago, the animated film to which I've dedicated the last 4 years of my life was shut down by the new studio execs. The only way I know how to deal with my impotent fury and sadness is to subject members of the public to the spectacle of me getting drunk and playing ballads.

Minchin spoke more about the film's cancellation on Richard Herring's Leicester Square Theatre Podcast in March 2020, saying how the film was 75% completed with 110 people working on the film, with songs completed. Hans Zimmer was also composing the score. After DreamWorks Animation was bought by Comcast subsidiary NBCUniversal (owners of Universal Pictures) in 2016, the film was cancelled and written off for the acquisition expenses, at the expense of DreamWorks. Illumination's Chris Meledandri was also consulted by Universal executives before the cancellation. He also explained how he tried to shop it to other studios, with Netflix and Animal Logic wanting to buy it, but the film's price tag was exorbitant, making it non-viable for other studios to acquire it. Overall, the film cost $90 million.

=== Resurrection ===
The film was brought back as a short, as part of the studio's newly announced shorts program. Bilby's three directors had worked together on the Larrikins animation team; Perifel served as head of character animation, Topaz as a lead animator, and Sans as a character supervisor.

Bilby proved to be a testing ground for various new animation software, including MoonRay, a light rendering engine that was used on DreamWorks' feature films beginning with How to Train Your Dragon: The Hidden World.

== Release ==
Bilby had its world premiere on June 16, 2018, as part of the closing ceremonies for the Annecy International Animated Film Festival. On December 21 of the same year, the short was released on DreamWorks' official YouTube channel, but in November 2020, the short was no longer available as the YouTube video was set to "Private". On March 3, 2019, one of the film's directors uploaded it to Vimeo.

Bilby, along with Bird Karma, was included on home video releases of How to Train Your Dragon: The Hidden World on May 21, 2019.

== Reception ==
Bilby received the Jury's Choice Award at the 45th SIGGRAPH conference, as well as the Audience Award at the Palm Springs International Festival of Short Films.
