= Bilby tower =

Steel survey tower

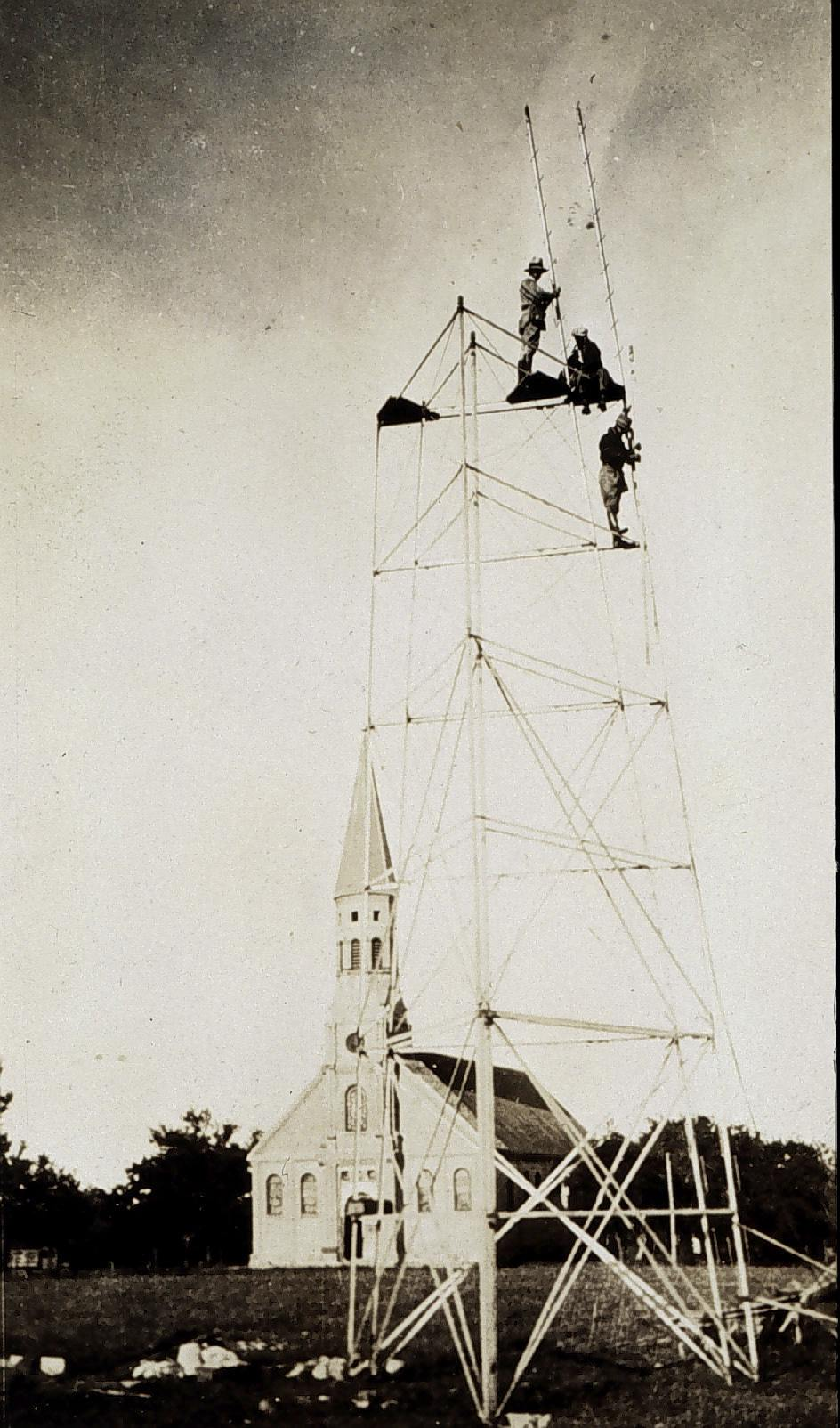
Bilby tower under construction in 1927

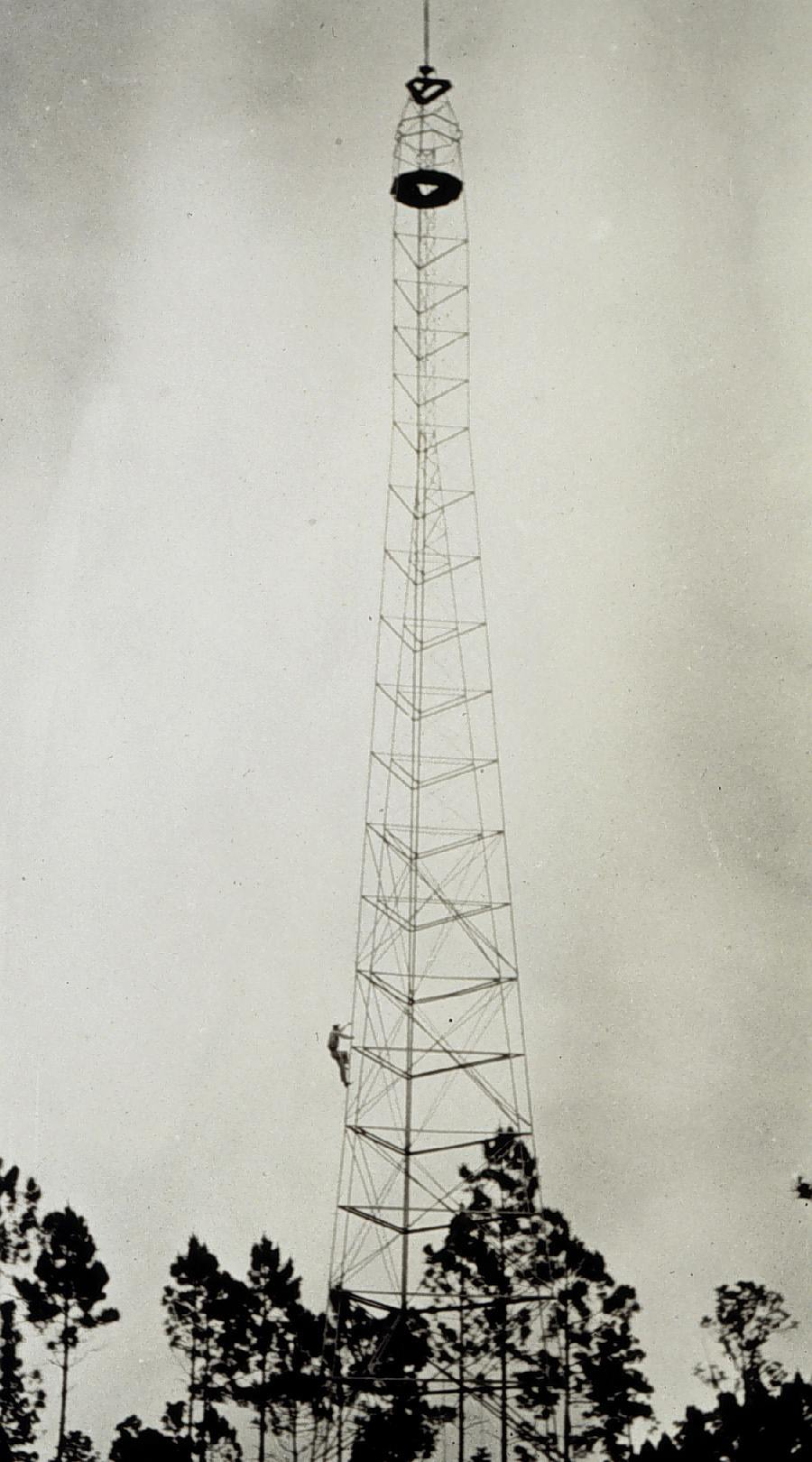
Completed Bilby tower showing inner tower for instrument isolated from outer tower for surveyor access

A Bilby tower is a type of survey tower made from steel and used by the United States Coast and Geodetic Survey (USC&GS) from 1927 to 1984. It is named after Jasper S. Bilby who designed it in 1926. In 1927, Herbert Hoover, then the Secretary of Commerce, commended Bilby's tower "for its cost and time efficiency" and cited the surveyor's service as "essential to the United States government".

== History ==
Jasper S. Bilby (1864–1949) was a surveyor employed by the USC&GS from 1884 to 1937. He served as Chief Signalman of the USC&GS from 1930 to 1937. Born in Rush County, Indiana, he later moved to a homestead near Osgood.

=== Design of the Bilby tower ===
Bilby began designing the first version of the Bilby tower in 1926 and worked with the Aermotor Windmill Company to develop the first prototypes. The tower was designed to elevate surveyors high enough to look over obstructions and to account for the curvature of the Earth in their calculations. The tower was tested with positive results and Bilby received a commendation from Secretary of Commerce Herbert Hoover for the invention.

The Bilby Tower was a massive success, saving money compared to previous options and increasing the efficiency of the USC&GS surveyors. They could be constructed and deconstructed in less than a third of the time of previous towers, were lighter, and were easier to move. In 1928 alone, use of the Bilby Tower cut costs by up to 35%, and over its first ten years of use it saved the government an estimated $3,000,000 (equivalent to $55,603,448 in 2025). Its use also spread outside the United States, reaching as far as Australia and Denmark. The towers were credited by The New York Times as being "one of the greatest aids to geodetic work."

Prior to the introduction of Bilby towers, surveyors would try to build towers only to the minimum functional height to minimize the resources expended to erect a tower. Bilby towers, with their low costs and ease of setting up, made this less of an issue. The last Bilby tower erected by the National Geodetic Survey was in 1984, and it was placed near Hartford, Connecticut.

=== Bilby's legacy ===
In 1930, Bilby was promoted to the newly created position of "Chief Signalman" of the USC&GS. In 1932 the federal retirement age was waived to allow him to continue serving. He retired in 1937. Over the course of his 53-year career, Bilby traveled over 500,000 miles across the United States. Bilby died on July 18, 1949, in Batesville, Indiana. The last remaining tower, at St. Charles Parish in Louisiana, was dismantled by the Surveyors Historical Society in 2012 and re-erected in 2013 at the Osgood Trails Park in Osgood, Indiana, the home town of Bilby.

== Features ==
The Bilby tower was designed to be used for triangulation. The towers have two unconnected parts—an internal tower for mounting surveying instruments and an external tower for surveyors. This separation allowed for isolating the instruments from the vibrations induced by people, which increased the precision of measurements. It was portable, reusable and quick to assemble and dismantle. Its quick erection made it possible to conduct surveying rapidly—a team of five men could assemble a steel Bilby tower in only five hours.

== See also ==
- Triangulation (surveying)
- Triangulation station
