= Kung Fu Panda 2 =

2011 DreamWorks Animation film

- Theatrical release poster
- Directed by: Jennifer Yuh Nelson
- Written by: Jonathan Aibel; Glenn Berger
- Produced by: Melissa Cobb
- Starring: Jack Black; Angelina Jolie; Dustin Hoffman; Gary Oldman; Seth Rogen; Lucy Liu; David Cross; James Hong; Michelle Yeoh; Danny McBride; Dennis Haysbert; Jean-Claude Van Damme; Victor Garber; Jackie Chan
- Edited by: Clare Knight
- Music by: Hans Zimmer; John Powell
- Production company: DreamWorks Animation
- Distributed by: Paramount Pictures (Note: In July 2014, the film's distribution rights were purchased by DreamWorks Animation from Paramount Pictures and transferred to 20th Century Fox before reverting to Universal Pictures in 2018 following NBCUniversal's acquisition of DreamWorks Animation in 2016.)
- Release dates: May 22, 2011 (Hollywood premiere); May 26, 2011 (United States)
- Running time: 90 minutes
- Country: United States
- Language: English
- Budget: $150 million
- Box office: $666 million

Kung Fu Panda 2 is a 2011 American animated martial arts comedy film directed by Jennifer Yuh Nelson and written by Jonathan Aibel and Glenn Berger. Produced by DreamWorks Animation, it is the second installment in the Kung Fu Panda franchise and the sequel to Kung Fu Panda (2008). It features Jack Black, Angelina Jolie, Dustin Hoffman, Seth Rogen, Lucy Liu, David Cross, James Hong, and Jackie Chan reprising their roles from the first film, with Gary Oldman, Michelle Yeoh, Danny McBride, Jean-Claude Van Damme, Dennis Haysbert, and Victor Garber joining the cast. In the film, Po and the Furious Five travel to Gongmen City to stop the peacock Lord Shen from conquering China while Po rediscovers his forgotten past. Kung Fu Panda 2 was released in theaters on May 26, 2011, by Paramount Pictures. It received positive reviews from critics and grossed $666 million against its $150 million budget, becoming the highest-grossing film from a female director until it was surpassed by Wonder Woman (2017). It became the sixth-highest-grossing film of 2011 and the highest-grossing film of the franchise so far. The film was nominated for the Academy Award for Best Animated Feature at the 84th Academy Awards. It was followed by Kung Fu Panda 3 in 2016 and Kung Fu Panda 4 in 2024.

== Plot ==
Long ago, in Ancient China, the peacock rulers of Gongmen City invented fireworks. However, their son, Lord Shen, discovered that the fireworks' gunpowder could be weaponised. Troubled by Shen's obsession, his parents consulted a Soothsayer, who foretold them that if he continued down this path, "a warrior of black and white" would defeat him. Overhearing the prophecy, Shen deduced that the warrior would be a panda and, in an attempt to avoid his fate, led his wolf army to exterminate a nearby panda village. Horrified by the massacre, Shen's parents banished him from the city.

In the present day, Po enjoys life as the Dragon Warrior alongside the Furious Five, but Master Shifu warns him that he has not yet achieved inner peace. Meanwhile, Shen's army raids villages for metal to build cannons that Shen will use to conquer China. Po and the Five intercept them, but an emblem on the head wolf's armor gives Po a memory flash of when he last saw his mother. Po consults his father, Mr. Ping, who reveals that he found Po as a cub in a crate of radishes outside his restaurant and adopted him when no one came to claim him. Po and the Five are dispatched to Gongmen City after learning that Shen has killed one of the regents, Master Thundering Rhino, with one of his cannons. Shen imprisons the other regents, Masters Storming Ox and Croc, and takes over the city, but the Soothsayer constantly reminds him of the prophecy.

In Gongmen City, Po and the Five find Ox and Croc, but they refuse to help, fearing Shen will use his cannons on the populace if they do. Po and the Five feign surrender to Shen, who brings them into Gongmen Palace to execute them with his prototype cannon. They free themselves and destroy it, but Po sees the same emblem on Shen's plumage, distracting him long enough for the latter to escape and destroy the palace with his now-completed arsenal of cannons. After escaping, Tigress confronts Po, who reveals that he remembers seeing Shen when he last saw his biological parents. Tigress sympathises but she and the others abandon him for his own safety and head to Shen's cannon factory to destroy it.

Po follows the Five to the factory and confronts Shen, which ruins the Five's demolition plan and gets them captured. Shen claims that Po's parents never loved him before shooting him with a cannon from a close range. Severely wounded but still alive, Po floats downriver and is healed by the Soothsayer at the abandoned village where Po once lived as a cub. She encourages Po to embrace his painful memories instead of fighting them. Po recalls his father fighting off Shen's army, while his mother hid him in a radish crate and sacrificed her life by distracting their pursuers away. Having reconciled with his past, Po finally achieves inner peace.

Po returns to Gongmen City, where Shen is sailing downriver with a fleet of warships. Po frees the Five and, with the help of Ox, Croc and Shifu, take out the foremost ships and stop the army from reaching the harbor. Shen fires from his own flagship to clear the way, scattering the Masters and leaving Po to stand alone against the fleet. Using his inner peace, Po redirects the cannonballs shot at him back at the remaining ships and destroys them, including Shen's flagship. Onboard its wreckage, Po encourages Shen to let go of his pain and hatred, but Shen refuses and attacks Po. In the process, Shen accidentally severs the ropes raising the ship's destroyed cannon, which then crushes him. Shifu and the Five congratulate Po for his victory and return to the Valley of Peace where Po acknowledges Mr. Ping as his father. Meanwhile, in a secret, distant panda village, Po's biological father senses that his son is still alive.

== Voice cast ==
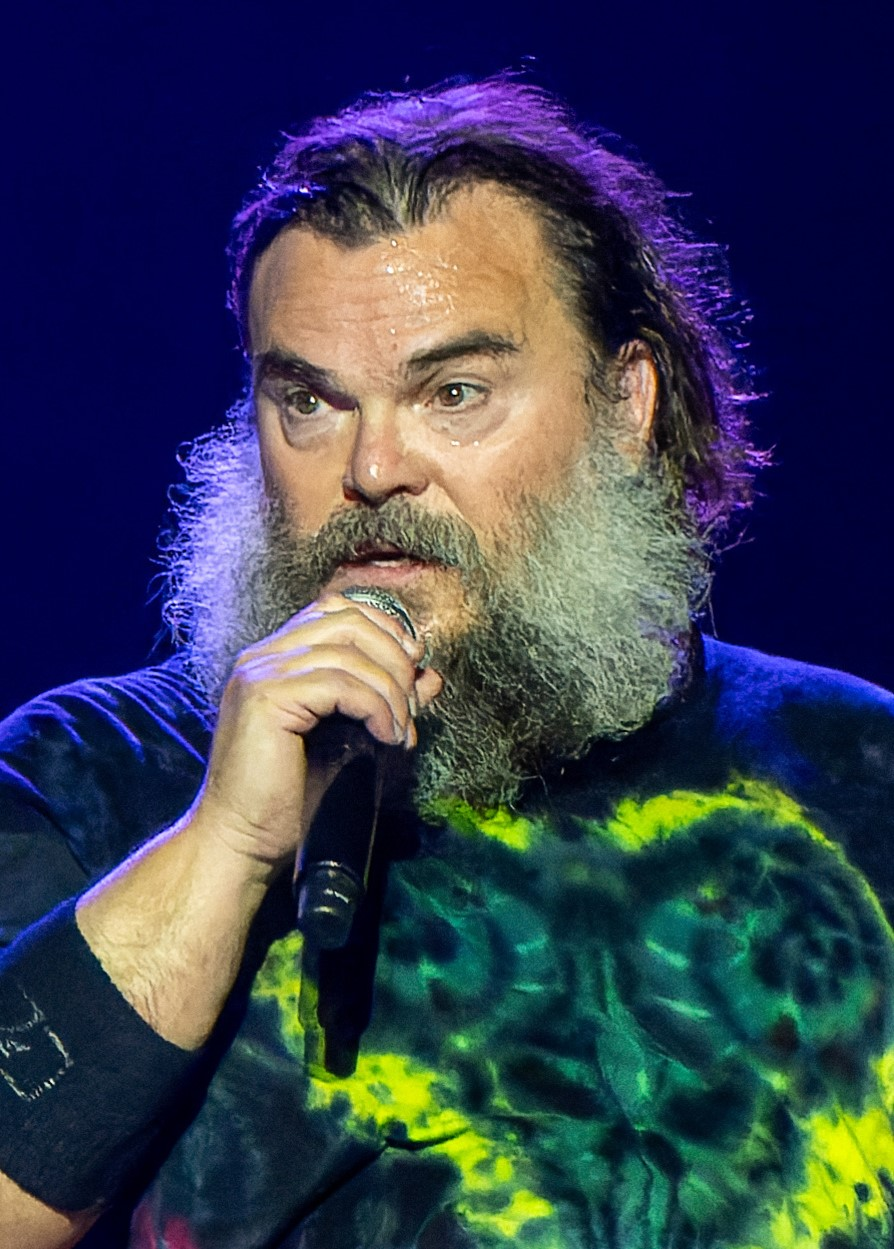
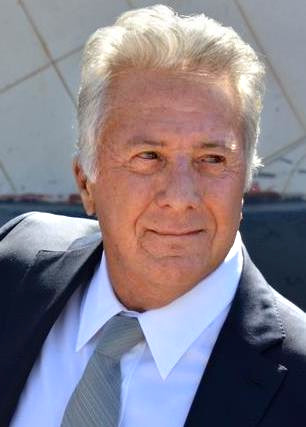
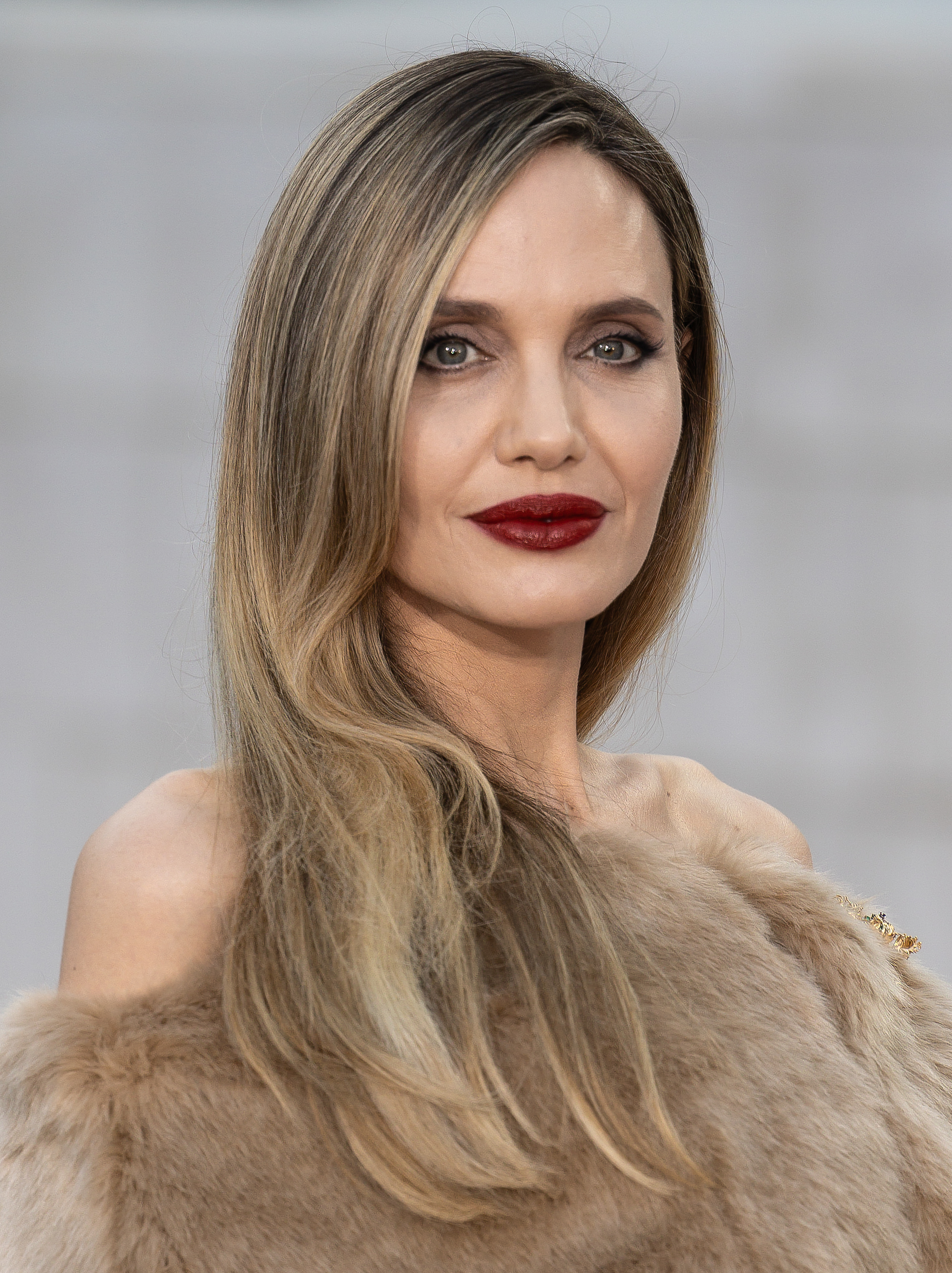
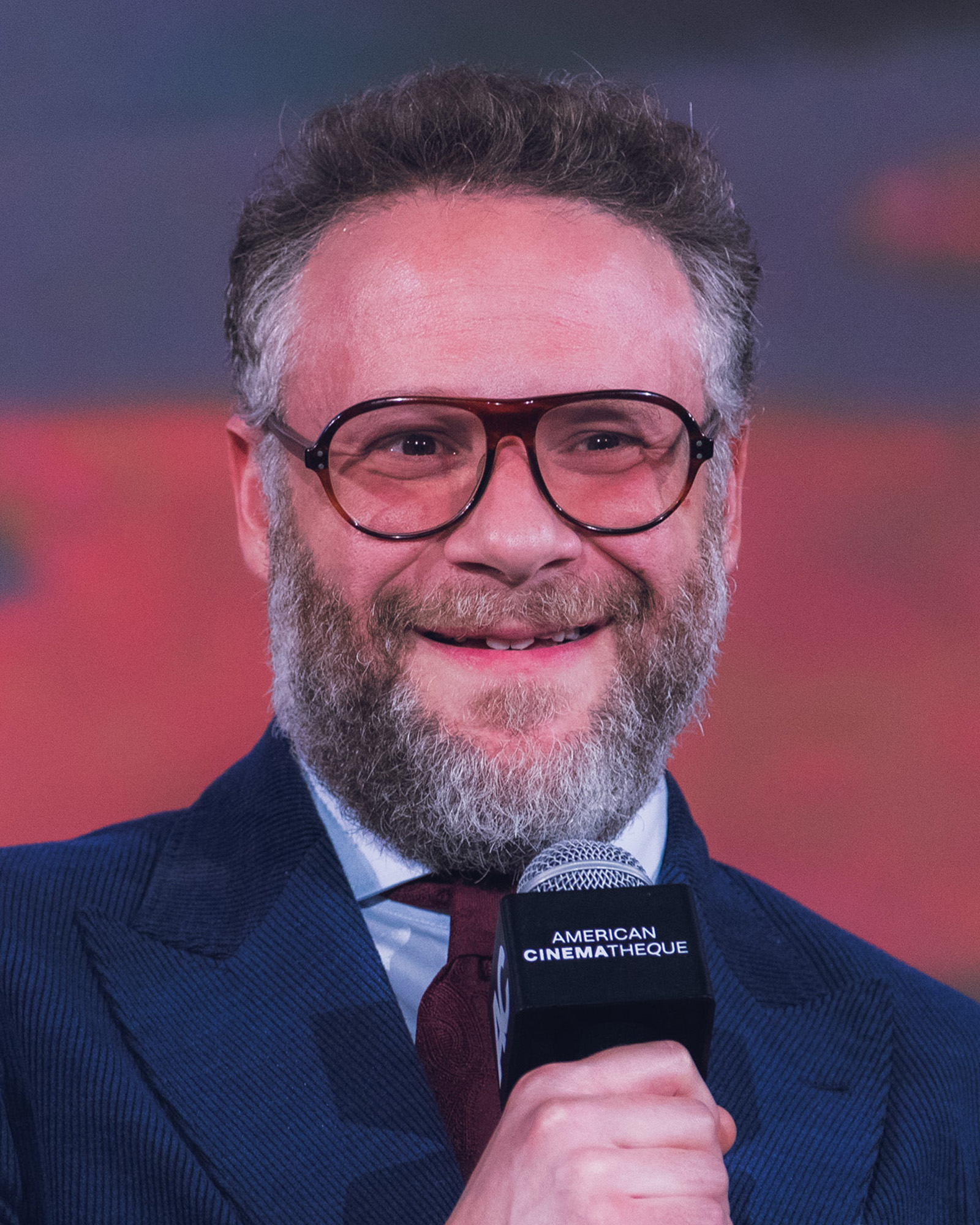
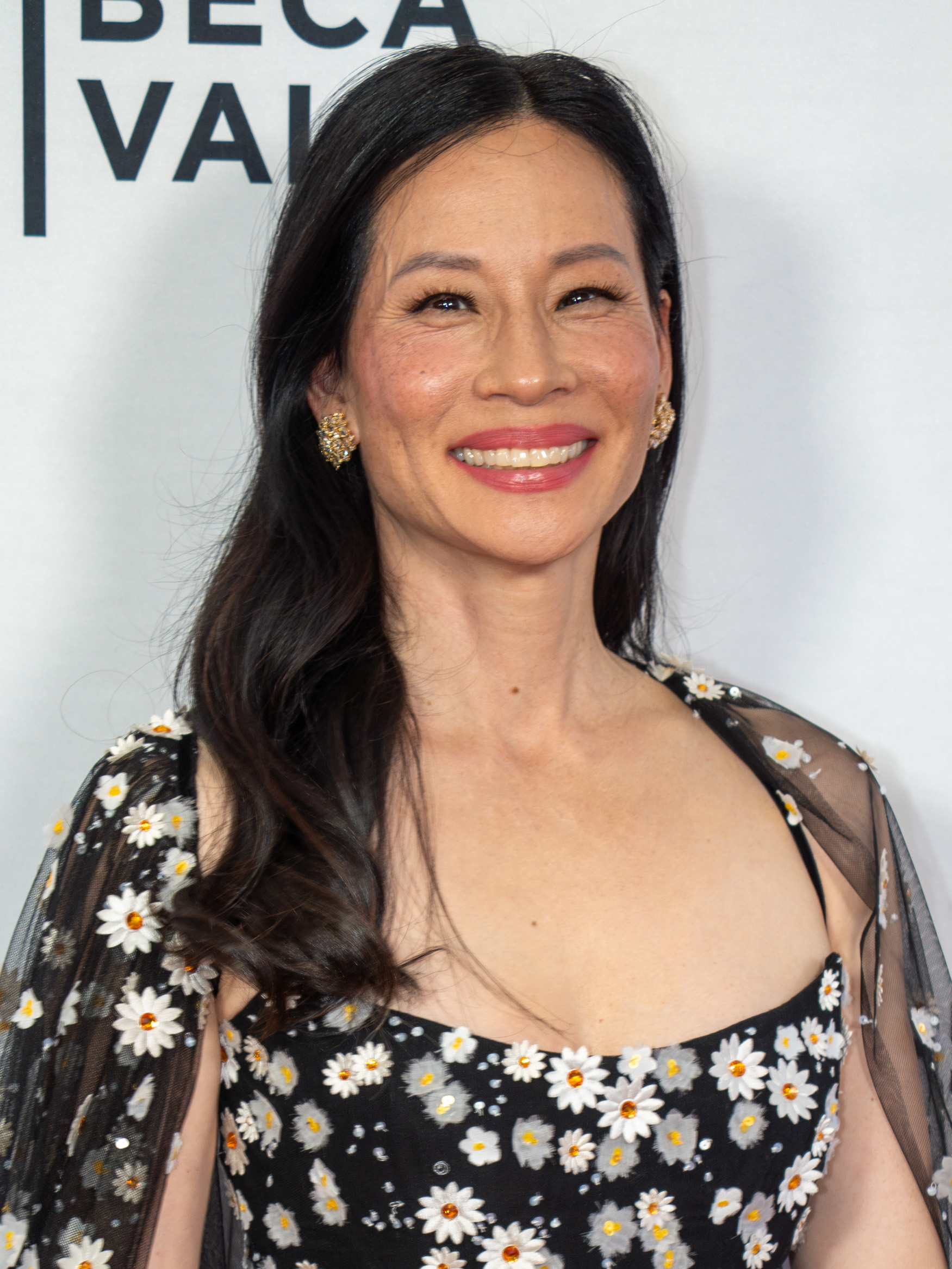
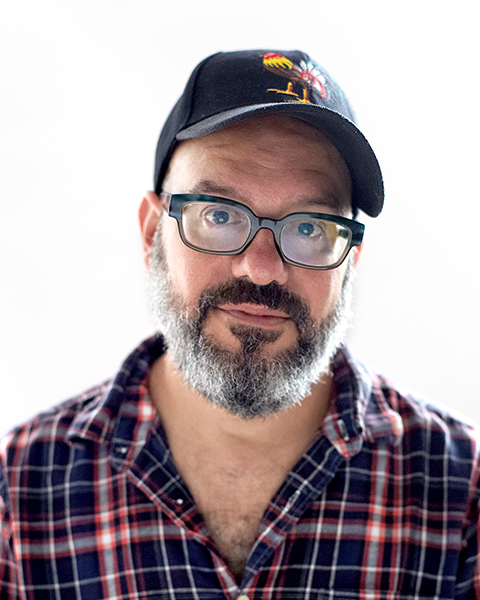
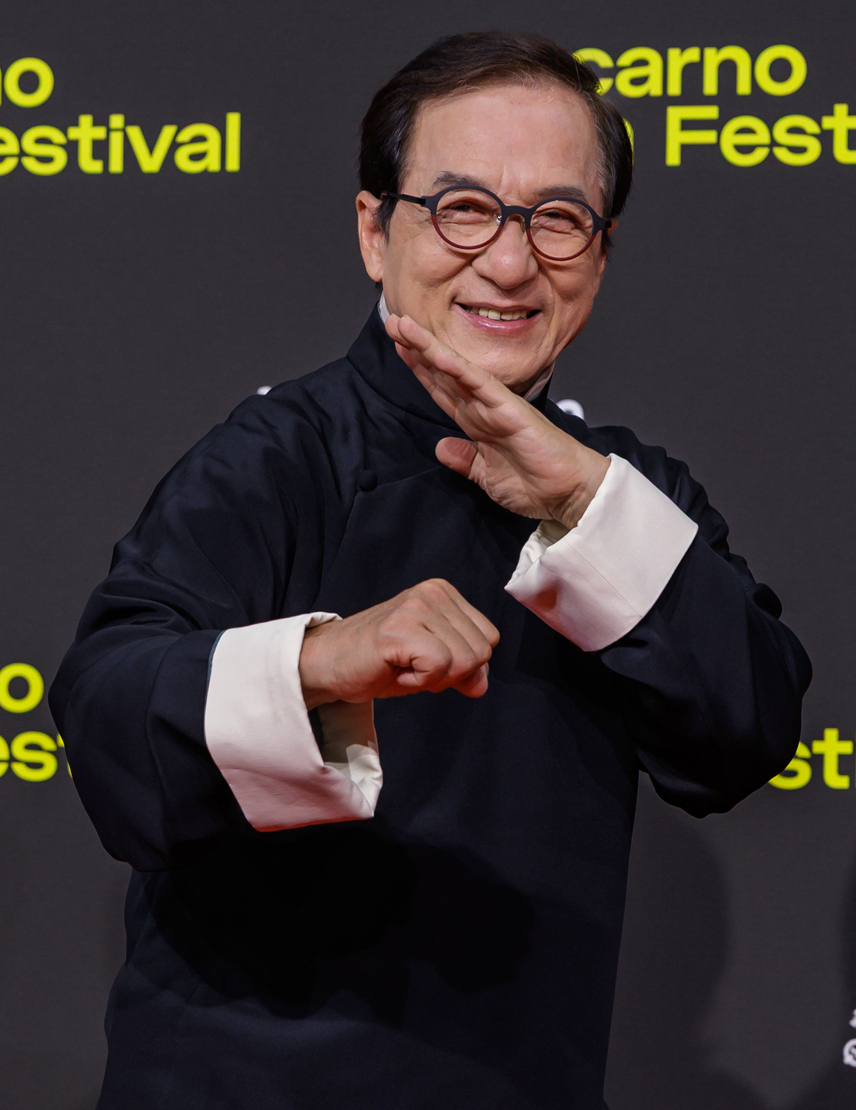
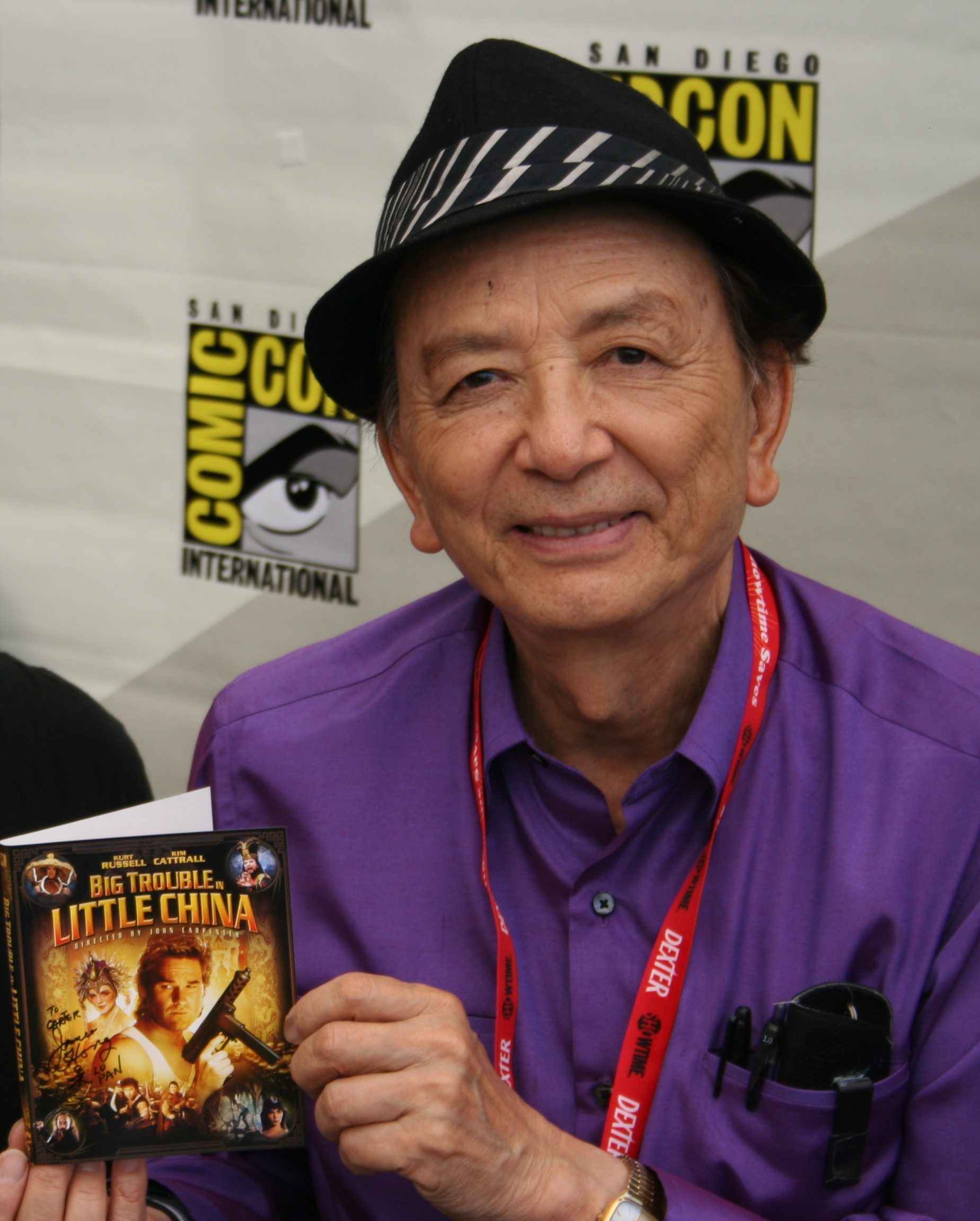
Jack Black (in 2023), Dustin Hoffman (in 2017), Angelina Jolie (in 2024), Seth Rogen (in 2025), Lucy Liu (in 2025), David Cross (in 2012), Jackie Chan (in 2025) and James Hong (in 2011).
- Jack Black as Master Po, a giant panda and the Dragon Warrior
  - Liam Knight as Baby Po
- Gary Oldman as Lord Shen, an albino peacock warlord
- Angelina Jolie as Master Tigress, a South China tiger and leader of the Furious Five
- Michelle Yeoh as Soothsayer, a wise goat
- Seth Rogen as Master Mantis, a Chinese mantis
- Lucy Liu as Master Viper, a green tree-viper
- David Cross as Master Crane, a red-crowned crane
- Jackie Chan as Master Monkey, a golden snub-nosed monkey
- Danny McBride as Wolf Boss, Shen's second-in-command
- Dennis Haysbert as Master Storming Ox
- Jean-Claude Van Damme as Master Croc
- James Hong as Mr. Ping, a Chinese goose and Po's adoptive father
- Dustin Hoffman as Master Shifu, a red panda kung-fu master and Po and the Five's mentor
- Victor Garber as Master Thundering Rhino
- Fred Tatasciore as Li Shan (credited as "Panda Dad"), Po's biological father
- Lauren Tom as Market Sheep
- Conrad Vernon as Boar

== Production ==
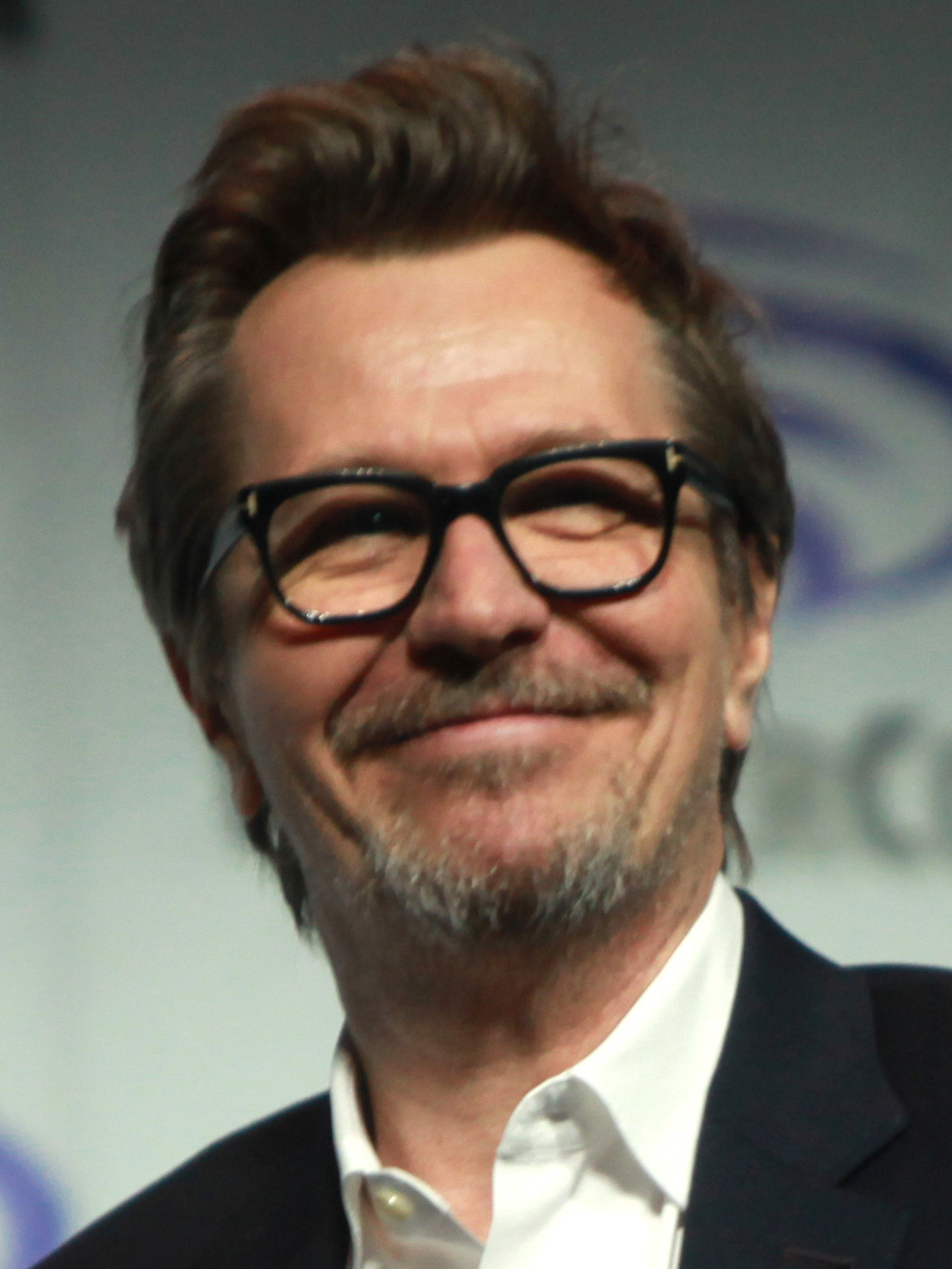
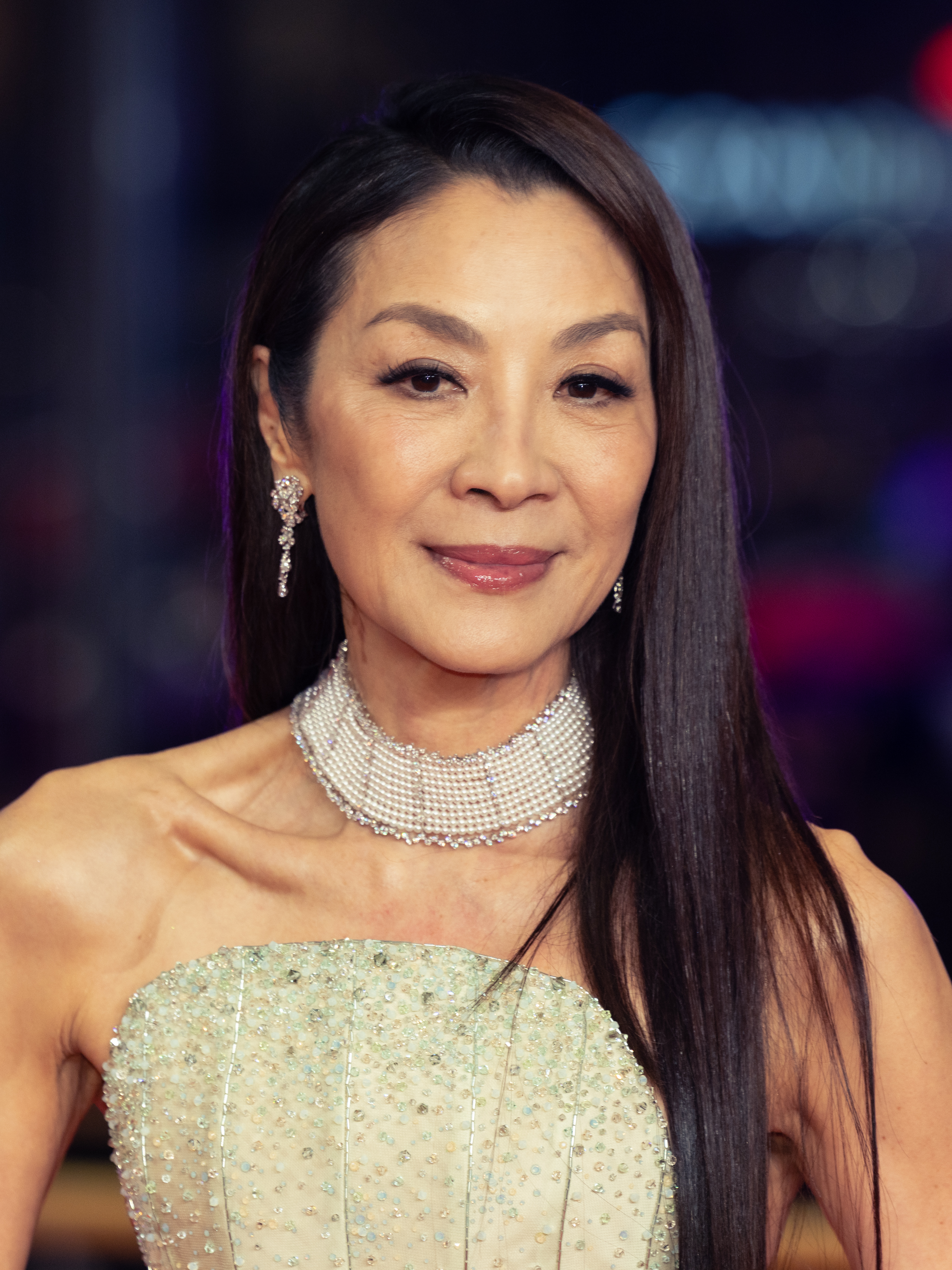
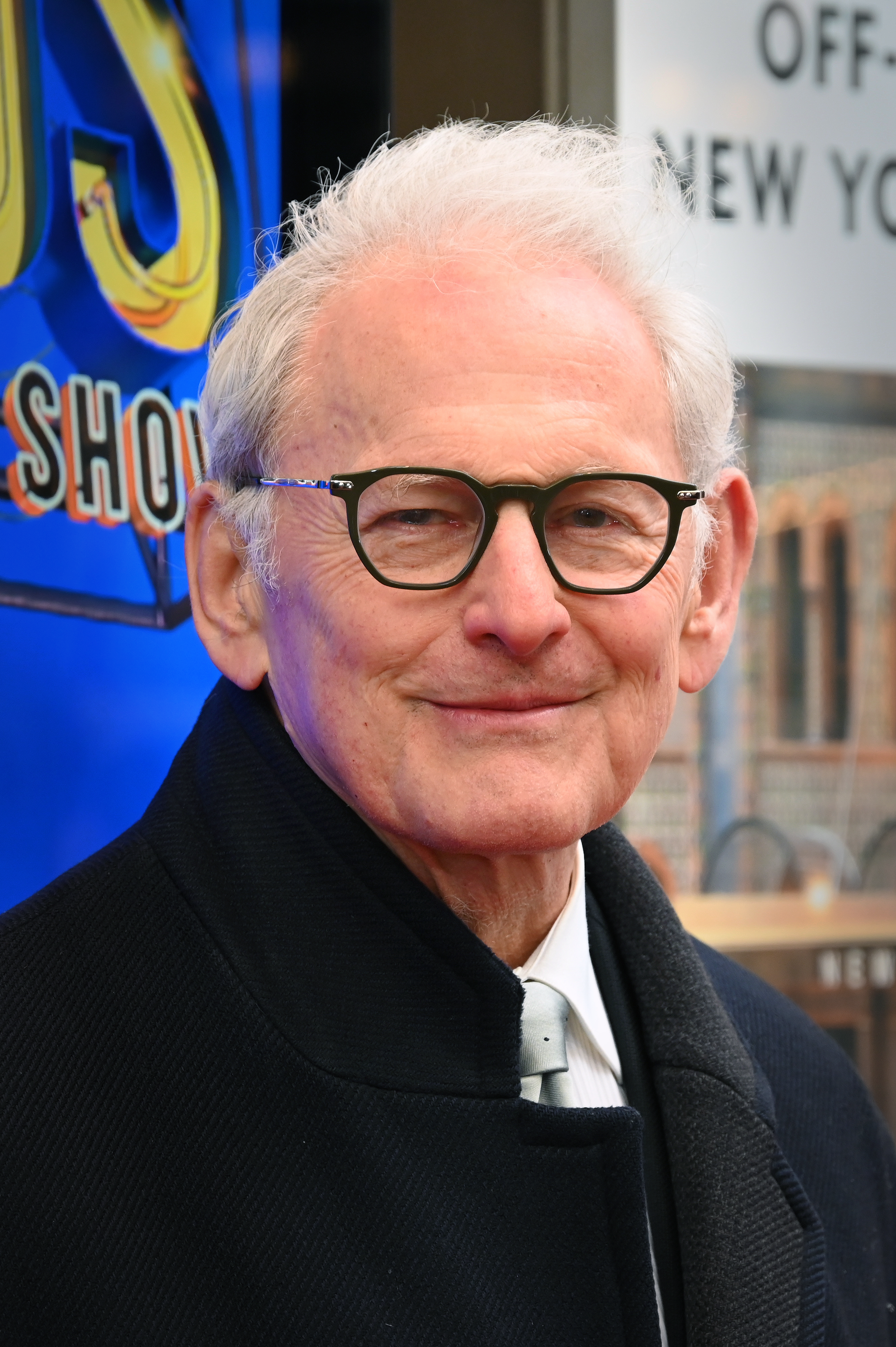
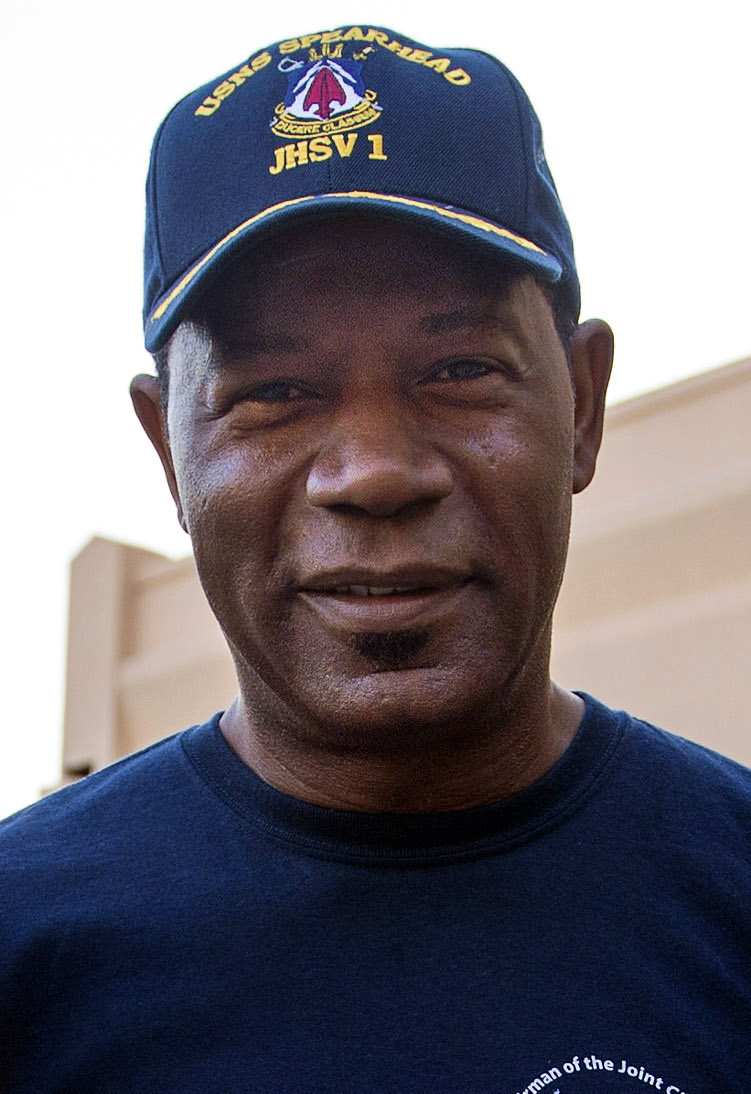
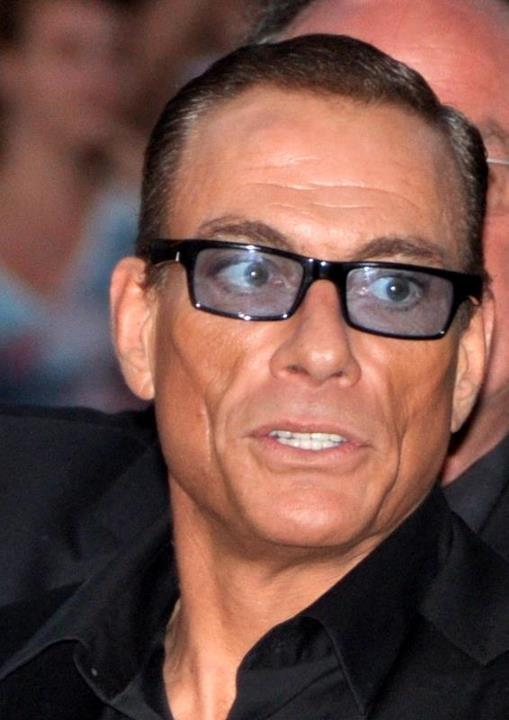
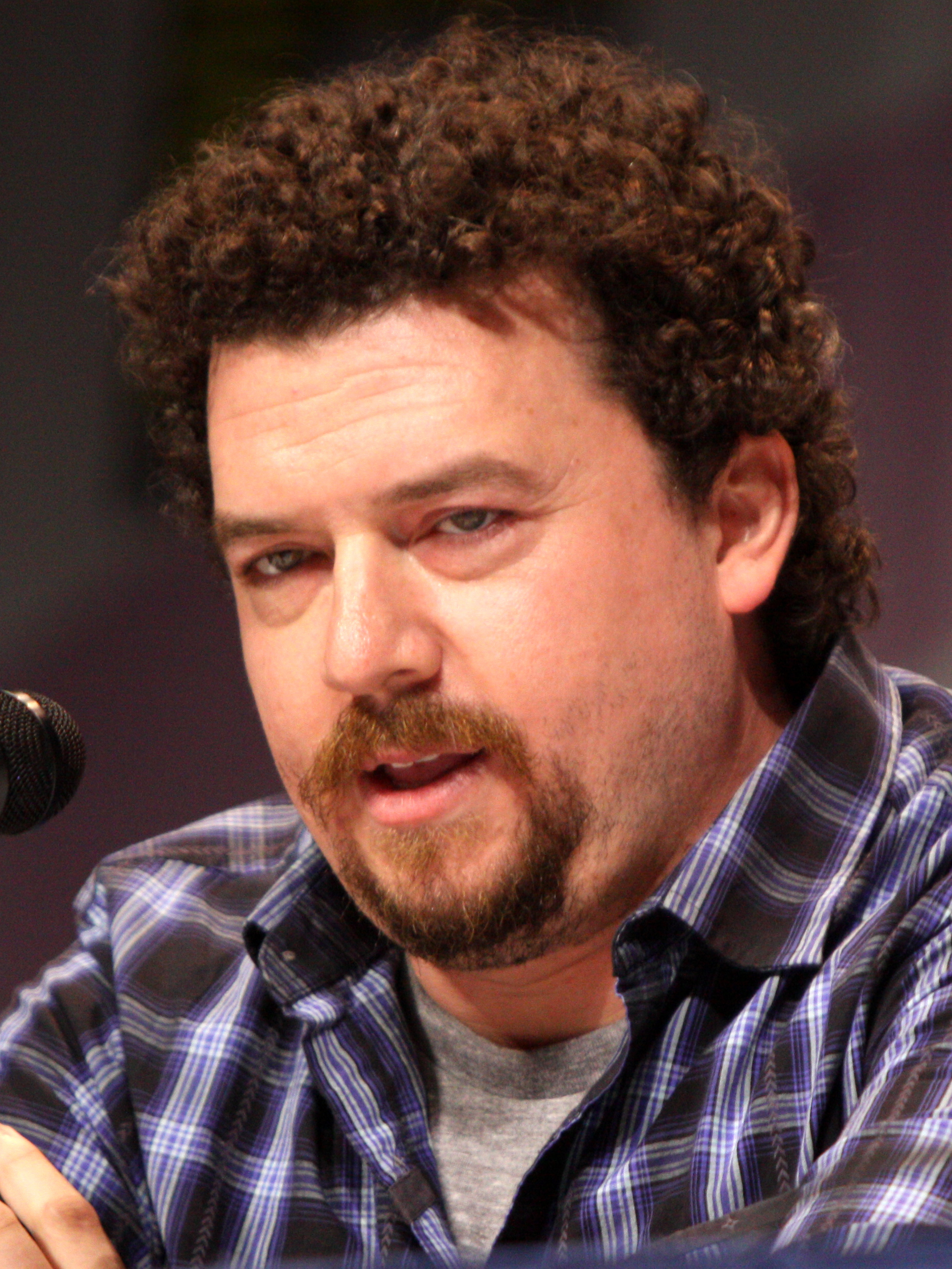
Gary Oldman (in 2014), Michelle Yeoh (in 2026), Victor Garber (in 2025), Dennis Haysbert (in 2015), Jean-Claude Van Damme (in 2012) and Danny McBride (in 2013).

When Kung Fu Panda was released in 2008, DreamWorks Animation planned a second film with the subtitle Pandamonium, which was changed by 2010 to Kaboom of Doom before being wholly retitled to Kung Fu Panda 2. Jennifer Yuh Nelson, who was head of story for the first film, was hired to replace John Stevenson and Mark Osborne as director for the sequel when it became evident that they would not be returning for the sequel. The first film's cast members reprised their voice roles. As with every DreamWorks Animation film from Monsters vs. Aliens onward, Kung Fu Panda 2 was produced in DreamWorks's stereoscopic 3D technology.

Jonathan Aibel and Glenn Berger, screenwriters and co-producers for the first film, returned to write and co-produce the sequel, with Charlie Kaufman consulting on the screenplay early in the development process.

In Kung Fu Panda 2, the production crew showed increased familiarity with Chinese culture. In 2008, after the release of Kung Fu Panda, DreamWorks CEO Jeffrey Katzenberg, director Nelson, and other DreamWorks members, including production designer Raymond Zibach, visited Chengdu, which is considered the "panda hometown". In addition to seeing real pandas at the Giant Panda Research Centre, the production-design crew learned about the local culture. Katzenberg has stated that the sequel incorporates many elements of Chengdu in the film.

The film's landscape and architecture also found inspiration from those found at Mount Qingcheng, a renowned Taoist mountain. In an interview with the China Daily, Zibach recounted that the Panda research center influenced the movie in a big way, as did their experience of holding a month-old panda cub named A Bao, which gave them the idea for baby Po in a flashback. It also gave them the idea of featuring Sichuan food, such as Mapo tofu and Dandan noodles. In an interview with Movieline, Berger stated, "We never really thought of this as a movie set in China for Americans; it's a movie set in a mythical, universalized China for everyone in the world."

Animator Januel Mercado served as a storyboard artist for Kung Fu Panda 2 beginning in 2008, marking his first animation work for a DreamWorks film as part of the studio's trainee program. Mercado worked alongside fellow San Jose State University alumnus Joel Crawford, with whom he became "like best friends ever since".

== Release ==
Kung Fu Panda 2 was screened at the 2011 Cannes Film Festival in early May, before its commercial release. In the United States, it premiered on May 22, 2011, at Grauman's Chinese Theatre in Hollywood, California. The film was widely released in the United States and South Korea on May 26, 2011, in the United Kingdom on June 10, 2011, and in Australia on June 23, 2011. It was also released in IMAX theaters in the EMEA region.

=== Home media ===
The film was released on DVD and Blu-ray on December 13, 2011, accompanied by the short film, Kung Fu Panda: Secrets of the Masters, and an episode of the Kung Fu Panda: Legends of Awesomeness television series. As of February 2013, 6.5 million home entertainment units were sold worldwide. It was released on Ultra HD Blu-ray on September 9, 2025.

== Reception ==
=== Critical reception ===
On the review aggregator site Rotten Tomatoes, the film has an approval rating of 82%, based on 185 reviews, with an average rating of 6.9/10. The site's consensus reads: "The storyline arc may seem a tad familiar to fans of the original, but Kung Fu Panda 2 offers enough action, comedy, and visual sparkle to compensate." Metacritic, which uses a weighted average, assigned the film a score of 67 out of 100, based on 34 critics, indicating "generally favorable" reviews. Audiences polled by CinemaScore gave the film an "A" grade on a scale of A+ to F.

Variety called the film "a worthy sequel that gets an extra kick from the addition of dynamic 3D fight sequences", while The Hollywood Reporter similarly praised the film. Roger Ebert of the Chicago Sun-Times gave the film 3.5 stars out of 4, praising the sequel as superior to the original, and as an ambitious extension of the previous story.

Some critics noted the influences of executive producer Guillermo del Toro's works in the film's darker themes. Jim Tudor of TwitchFilm.net said that, with del Toro on board, the film "effectively probes deeper into Po's emerging hero's journey and personal issues, evoking a truly fulfilling Campbellian archetype, but also remains fully viable as mainstream entertainment suitable for all ages".

As with the first film, the animation has been praised. Frank Lovece of Film Journal International described the film as "truly beautiful to behold", and stated that it "works on both aesthetic and emotional levels". Betsy Sharkey of the Los Angeles Times wrote that "Panda 2 is not just wall-to-wall animation, it is artistry of the highest order".

Many critics praised Gary Oldman's voice acting and developed characterization of Lord Shen, with some comparing him favorably to Ian McShane's voice performance as Tai Lung in the first film. Angie Errigo of Empire called him "fabulous as the feathered fiend and his character animators do his performance proud with a stunning, balletic fighting style, the fan tail flicking with lethal fascination".

=== Box office ===
The film grossed $165 million in the United States and Canada, along with $500 million in other territories, for a worldwide total of $666 million. In total, 3D contributed approximately 53% of the film's worldwide gross. Worldwide, it was the sixth-highest-grossing film of 2011, and the 28th highest-grossing animated film. During its first weekend, it earned $108.9 million worldwide, ranking third behind Pirates of the Caribbean: On Stranger Tides and The Hangover Part II. It was the highest-grossing film directed by a woman until Frozen two years later, as the well as the highest-grossing film directed solely by a woman until Wonder Woman.

In North America, the film earned $5.8 million on its opening day (Thursday, May 26, 2011), ranking second behind The Hangover Part II. On Friday, the film earned $13.1 million, which was behind the first film's $20.3 million opening Friday. Over the three-day weekend (Friday-to-Sunday), the film earned $47.7 million, which was behind the first film's $60.2 million debut; it also finished second at the box office, behind The Hangover Part II. The film made $13.2 million on Memorial Day, bringing its four-day weekend total to $60.9 million.

Outside North America, the film debuted with $55.5 million on the same weekend as its North American debut, topping the box office in nine of eleven countries in which it was released. It ranked third overall, behind Pirates of the Caribbean: On Stranger Tides and The Hangover Part II. The film topped the box office outside North America on two consecutive weekends (its third and fourth weekend).

In China, its highest-grossing market after North America, two different grosses were reported: a $19.3 million two-day weekend and a $16.7 million two-day weekend. Either way, the film set an opening-day record in the country. It earned $93.19 million in total, making it the highest-grossing animated film released in China, surpassing the previous record-holder, Kung Fu Panda ($26 million). It held the record until 2015, when it was surpassed by the Chinese film, Monkey King: Hero Is Back. The Asian-themed film scored the largest opening weekend for an animated film in Malaysia, the Philippines, Singapore, South Korea and Thailand. It became the highest-grossing film released in Vietnam, surpassing Avatar.

=== Accolades ===
Accolades received by Kung Fu Panda 2
Award	Category	Recipient(s)	Result	Ref.
Academy Awards	Best Animated Feature	Jennifer Yuh Nelson	Nominated	
Alliance of Women Film Journalists	Best Animated Film	Kung Fu Panda 2	Nominated	
Alliance of Women Film Journalists	Best Animated Female	Angelina Jolie	Nominated	
Alliance of Women Film Journalists	Best Woman Director	Jennifer Yuh Nelson	Nominated	
Annie Awards	Best Animated Feature	Melissa Cobb	Nominated	
Annie Awards	Animated Effects in an Animated Production	Dave Tidgwell; Jason Mayer	Nominated	
Annie Awards	Character Animation in a Feature Production	Dan Wagner; Pierre Perifel	Nominated	
Annie Awards	Directing in a Feature Production	Jennifer Yuh Nelson	Won	
Annie Awards	Production Design in a Feature Production	Raymond Zilbac	Won	
Annie Awards	Storyboarding in a Feature Production	Gary Graham; Philip Craven	Nominated	
Annie Awards	Voice Acting in a Feature Production	Gary Oldman	Nominated	
Annie Awards	Voice Acting in a Feature Production	James Hong	Nominated	
Annie Awards	Editing in a Feature Production	Clare Knight	Nominated	
British Academy Children's Awards	Feature Film	Jonathan Aibel, Glenn Berger, Melissa Cobb, Jennifer Yuh Nelson	Nominated	
Critics' Choice Awards	Best Animated Feature	Jennifer Yuh Nelson	Nominated	
Golden Reel Awards	Best Sound Editing – Sound Effects, Foley, Dialogue and ADR in an Animation Feature Film	Kung Fu Panda 2	Nominated	
Houston Film Critics Society	Best Animated Film	Kung Fu Panda 2	Nominated	
Kids' Choice Awards	Favorite Animated Movie	Kung Fu Panda 2	Nominated	
Kids' Choice Awards	Favorite Voice From an Animated Movie	Jack Black	Nominated	
Online Film Critics Society	Best Animated Feature	Melissa Cobb	Nominated	
People's Choice Awards	Favorite Movie Animated Voice	Jack Black	Nominated	
Producers Guild of America Awards	Best Animated Theatrical Motion Pictures	Melissa Cobb	Nominated	
San Diego Film Critics Society Awards	Best Animated Film	Jennifer Yuh Nelson and Mellisa Cobb	Nominated	
Satellite Awards	Motion Picture, Animated or Mixed Media	Kung Fu Panda 2	Nominated	
Saturn Awards	Best Animated Film	Kung Fu Panda 2	Nominated	
St. Louis Gateway Film Critics Association Awards	Best Animated Film	Jennifer Yuh Nelson	Nominated	
Teen Choice Awards	Choice Movie Animated Voice	Jack Black	Nominated	
Visual Effects Society Awards	Outstanding Visual Effects in an Animated Feature Motion Picture	Melissa Cobb, Alex Parkinson, Jennifer Yuh Nelson, Raymond Zibach	Nominated	
Women Film Critics Circle	Best Animated Females	Kung Fu Panda 2	Nominated	

== Marketing ==
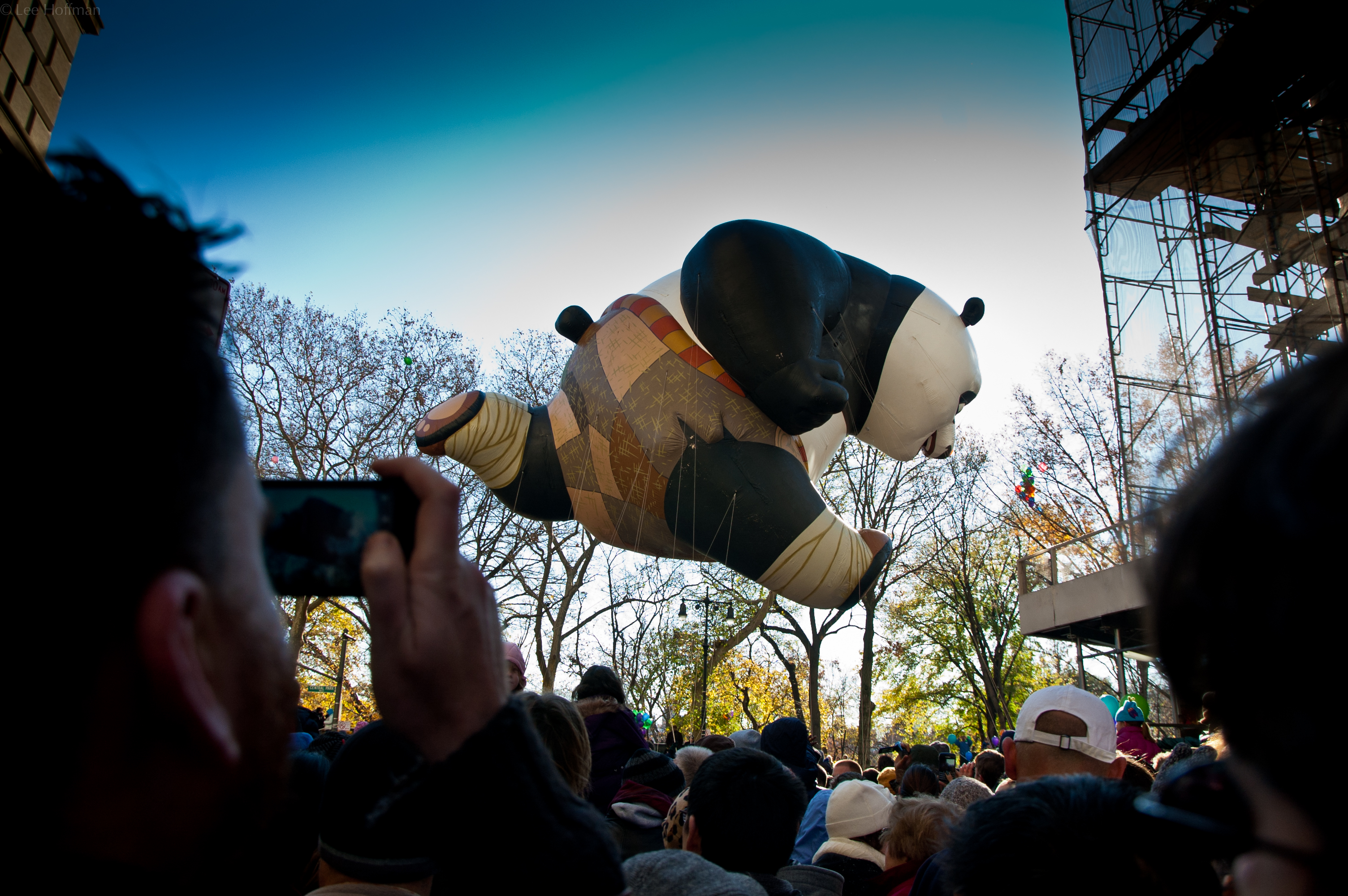
A Po parade balloon at the 2011 Macy's Thanksgiving Day Parade.

DreamWorks Animation has invested $100 million in creating promotional partners and building up marketing for its films. For Kung Fu Panda 2, DWA had partnerships with McDonald's, AT&T, Best Buy, General Mills, Sun-Maid, Airheads, Hint Water and HP. The film's characters were used in products and advertising campaigns across various media. The studio also pursued social media efforts to promote the film.

DWA partnered with House Foods America to brand its products, notably tofu, with advertising of the film. Variety reported that the partnership was the first ever between a film studio and a tofu company. The studio also enlisted the parade balloon of Po from the Macy's Thanksgiving Day Parade to tour in six cities, concluding with Los Angeles during Memorial Day weekend in late May 2011.

Merchandise was also produced for the film: Fisher-Price, THQ, Hallmark and Jem Sportswear. Publishers VTech, Penguin Books, Dalmatian Press and Ape Entertainment released books tied to the film.

== Soundtrack ==
Kung Fu Panda 2 is the soundtrack of the film, collaboratively scored by Hans Zimmer and John Powell, and originally released May 24, 2011.

== Video game ==
A video-game adaptation of the film was developed by Griptonite Games and published by THQ May 23, 2011. The game was released for the PlayStation 3, Xbox 360, Wii and Nintendo DS platforms. The plot takes place after the events of the film, and features Po and the rest of the Furious Five troubled by an evil group of Komodo dragon mercenaries. With the help of the other kung fu masters, Po has to uncover the plot behind this siege and put a stop to it.

== Sequels ==
Kung Fu Panda 2 was followed by Kung Fu Panda 3. It became one of the highest-grossing animated films of 2016. Kung Fu Panda 4 released on March 8, 2024.
