= Jasper S. Bilby =

American surveyor (1864–1949)

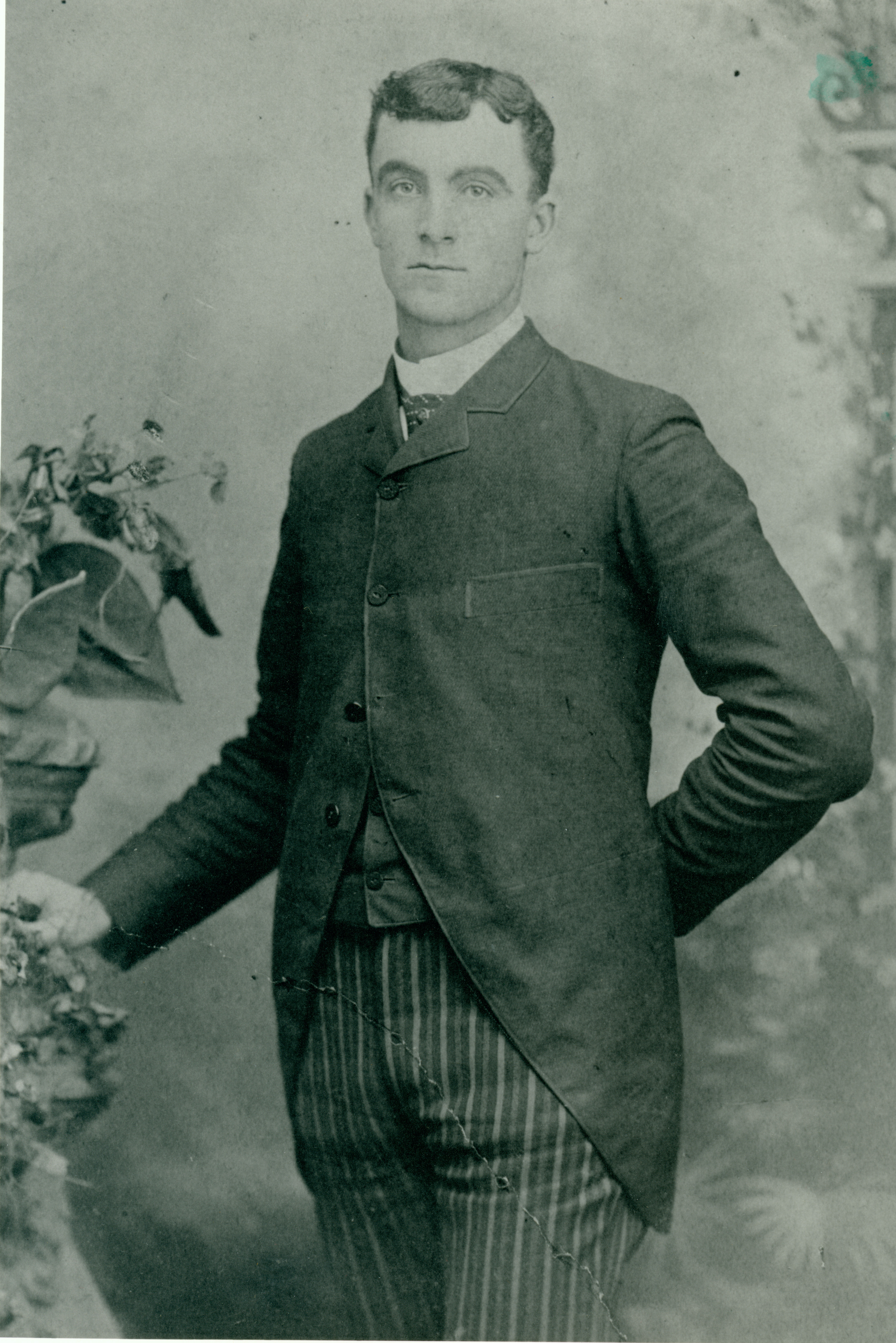
Bilby at age 20 (1884 or 1885)

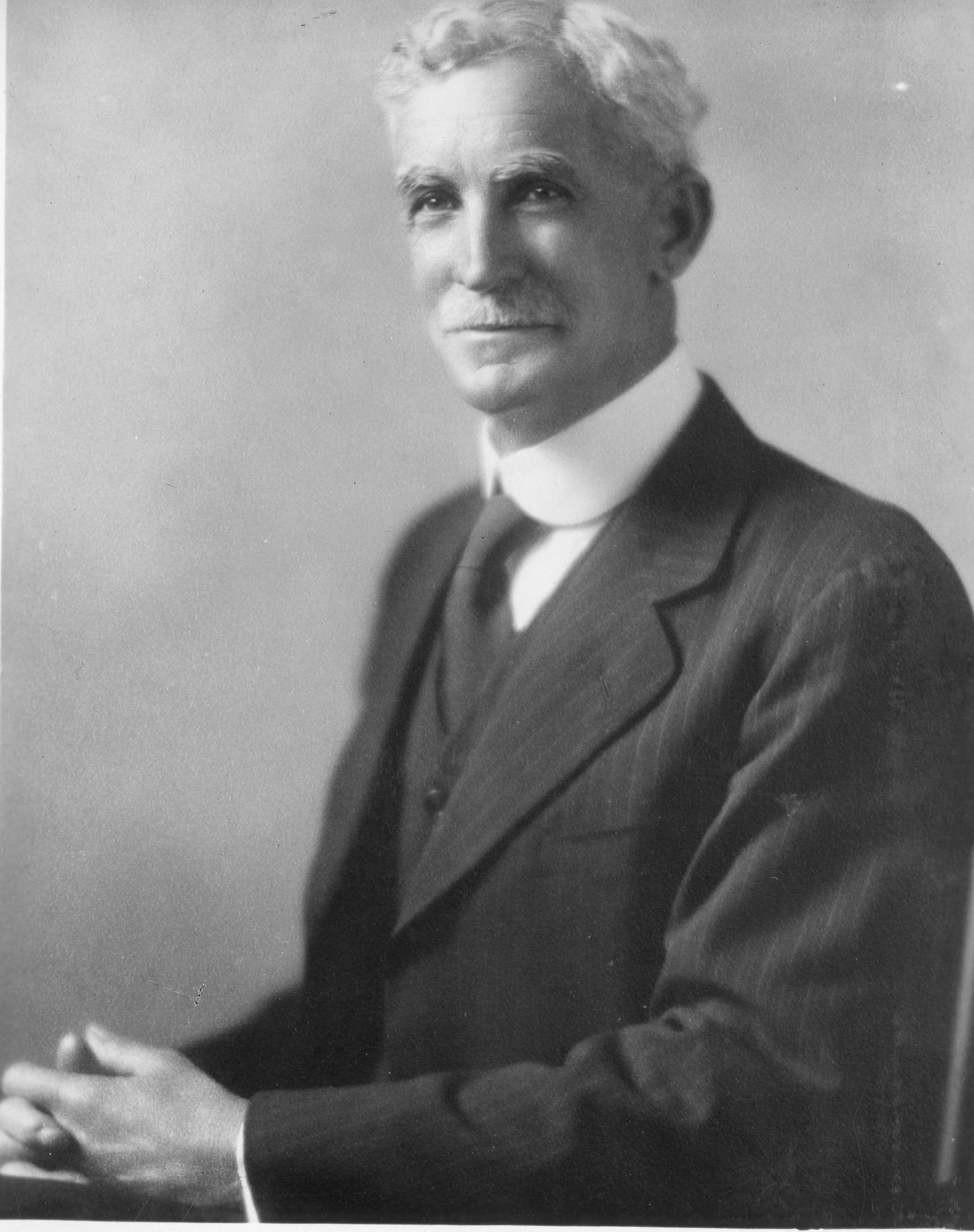
Bilby at age 65 (1930)

Jasper Sherman Bilby (July 16, 1864 – July 18, 1949) was a surveyor and geodesist who worked for the U.S. Coast and Geodetic Survey from 1884 to 1937, including as the agency's chief signalman from 1930 to 1937. He is best known for the eponymous Bilby tower, a type of survey tower which he developed in 1926.

Bilby was born on July 16, 1864, in Rush County, Indiana, near Rushville. He was born to Margaret E. (née Hazard) Bilby and Jasper N. Bilby, who committed suicide in jail in 1877 after being arrested for sexual assault. This forced Bilby to drop out of school and work on the family farm in Fayette County to support his family. He married Luella Cox in 1891, and later moved to Ripley County near Osgood.

He joined the Coast and Geodetic Survey in 1884; one of his first tasks was surveying along the 39th parallel. In 1920, he and his team surveyed most of Wisconsin and Illinois, noting the coordinates of various locations within the states. During this time, Bilby used wooden survey towers in his work, but was dissatisfied with the technology. Bilby developed a tower design that allowed surveyors obtain a higher vantage point while being more cost-effective and procedurally efficient than previous designs. Herbert Hoover, who was then Secretary of Commerce, sent a letter to Bilby in 1927 commending him for the development. In 1930, Bilby was made the inaugural "Chief Signalman" of the C&GS.

To prevent Bilby's mandatory retirement, then–President Hoover made an executive order in 1932 to waive the mandatory retirement age, allowing Bilby to stay in the agency. Eventually, Bilby retired, and left the C&GS in 1937; his last assignment had been at a triangulation station in Hunt City, Illinois, on the 39th parallel. He died on July 18, 1949, in Batesville, Indiana. In 2013, a Bilby tower was erected in Osgood to commemorate Bilby in his hometown. The next year, the National Geodetic Survey dedicated it in his honor.
