= Bilbe =

Bilbe is a surname originating from Europe. Variations in spelling include: Bilbé, Beilby, Bielby, Bilbee, Bilbey, Bilbi or Bilby, all pronounced either Bill-Bay or Bill-Bee. The oldest record for the name is in the Will of George Bilbe Leather Seller of Saint Mary Magdalen, Bermondsey, Surrey, dated 1667. One of the earliest records for the spelling variant Beilby is in the Chancery Court records, 1515–1518.

In Sheerness on the Isle of Sheppy, Kent, John Beilby marries Elizabeth Light on 29 October 1769. His children, Joseph, Thomas and John change the spelling of their name to Bilbe and pass the spelling on to their children. Thomas Bilbe was born in Sheerness in 1811, and subsequently moved to Rotherhithe

On the 1841 UK Census there are 38 people with the surname Bilbe, 32 of whom were born in Kent. On the 1851 Census there are 30 people with the surname Bilbe, 15 of them are still living on the Isle of Sheppy, 8 are living in Canterbury and 4 live in the London area. The numbers expand rapidly after this date many living and working in London.

There is a theory that the name originated in France and was brought to England by Huguenots fleeing persecution. This is supported by the fact that the name seems to arrive on the east coast of England. There are two places in the UK where the name appears to cluster: The Isle of Sheppey in Kent and later at Sculcoates in Yorkshire. The variant Beilby seems to be centred on Kingston upon Hull during the 1700s. Karl Pearson's grandmother was a Bielby – this is believed to be linked with the village of Bielby in East Yorkshire.

== Notable people called Bilbe ==
- Thomas Bilbe (1803–1896) was born in Sheerness in 1803, and subsequently moved to Rotherhithe. He became a prominent shipbuilder.
- Thomas Bilbe Robinson (1853–1939) was grandson of the above. He was as Agent-General for Queensland Australia.
