= Kenneth W. Bilby =

American businessman (1918–1997)

- Kenneth Bilby (L) in Israel, 1948
- Born: October 7, 1918; Salt Lake City, Utah, US
- Died: August 1, 1997 (aged 78); Dallas, Texas, US
- Education: University of Arizona
- Occupation: Executive vice president
- Employer: RCA
- Known for: Legion of Honour
- Spouses: Helen Owen Lehman; Joanne Stroud

Kenneth Whipple Bilby (October 7, 1918 – August 1, 1997) was a recipient of the Legion of Honour, an executive vice president of RCA, and the author of The General, a book on David Sarnoff's role in the creation of RCA and television.

== Biography ==
Bilby was born on October 7, 1918, in Salt Lake City, Utah, to Ralph Willard Bilby and Marguerite Mansfield. He had a brother, Richard Bilby, who became a judge on the United States District Court for the District of Arizona.

Bilby joined the Army on October 15, 1941. During World War II, he served with the 30th Infantry Division in France and Germany, and was awarded The Legion of Honor, the Bronze Star and the Silver Star. Bilby became a lieutenant colonel. After the World War, he covered the 1948 Arab–Israeli War and authored the book: New Star in the Near East.

Bilby married Helen Owen Lehman in 1948. When he retired from RCA, Bilby was appointed Executive in Residence at Harvard Business School.

== Books ==
- New Star in the Near East, Doubleday
- The General: David Sarnoff and the rise of the Communications Industry (1986), Harper and Row, ISBN 0-06-015568-X
