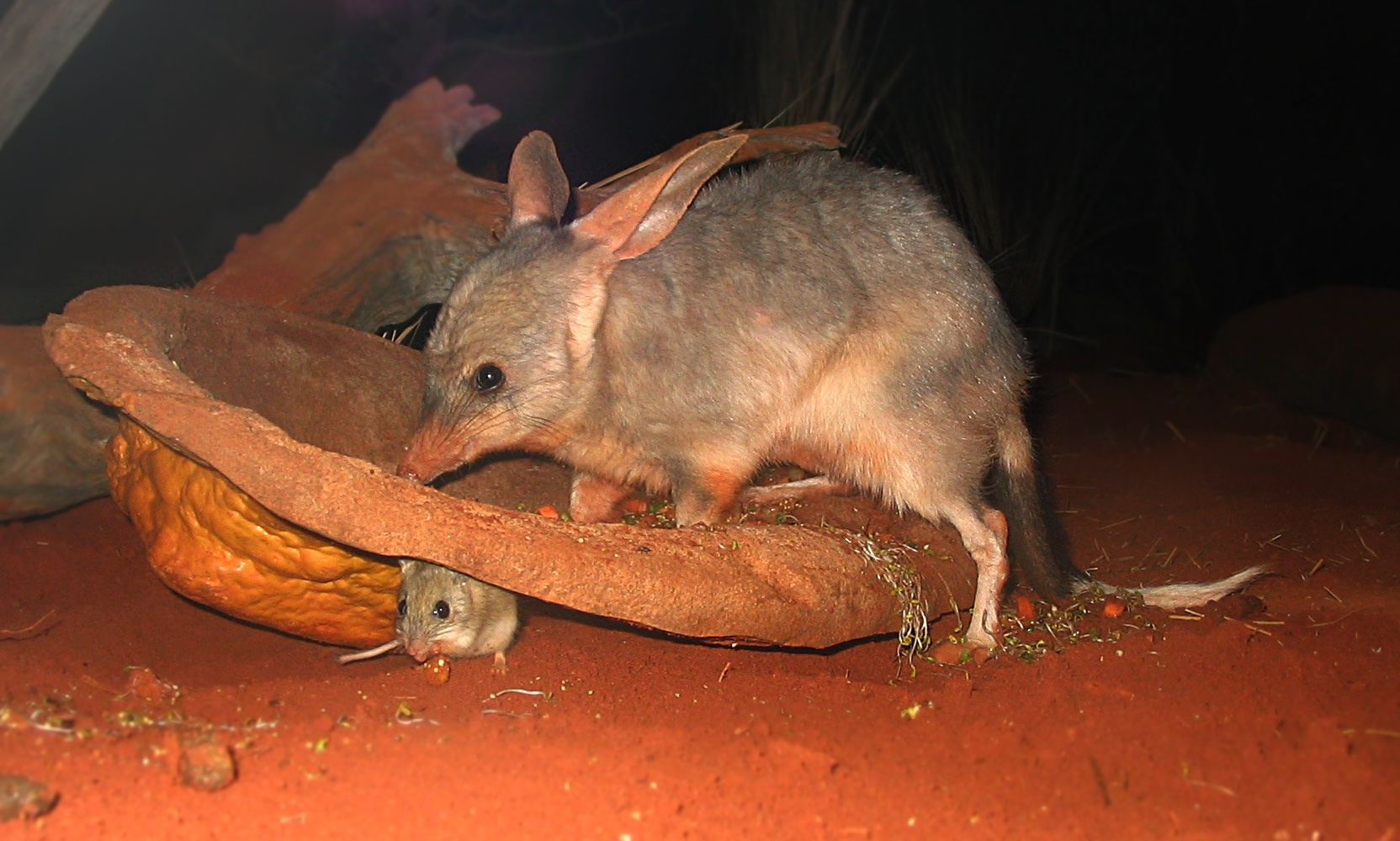
- Bilby (right) and spinifex hopping mouse at Sydney Wildlife World

Conservation status
- Vulnerable (IUCN 3.1)
- CITES Appendix I

Scientific classification
- Kingdom: Animalia
- Phylum: Chordata
- Class: Mammalia
- Infraclass: Marsupialia
- Order: Peramelemorphia
- Family: Thylacomyidae
- Genus: Macrotis
- Species: M. lagotis

Binomial name
- Macrotis lagotis Reid, 1837
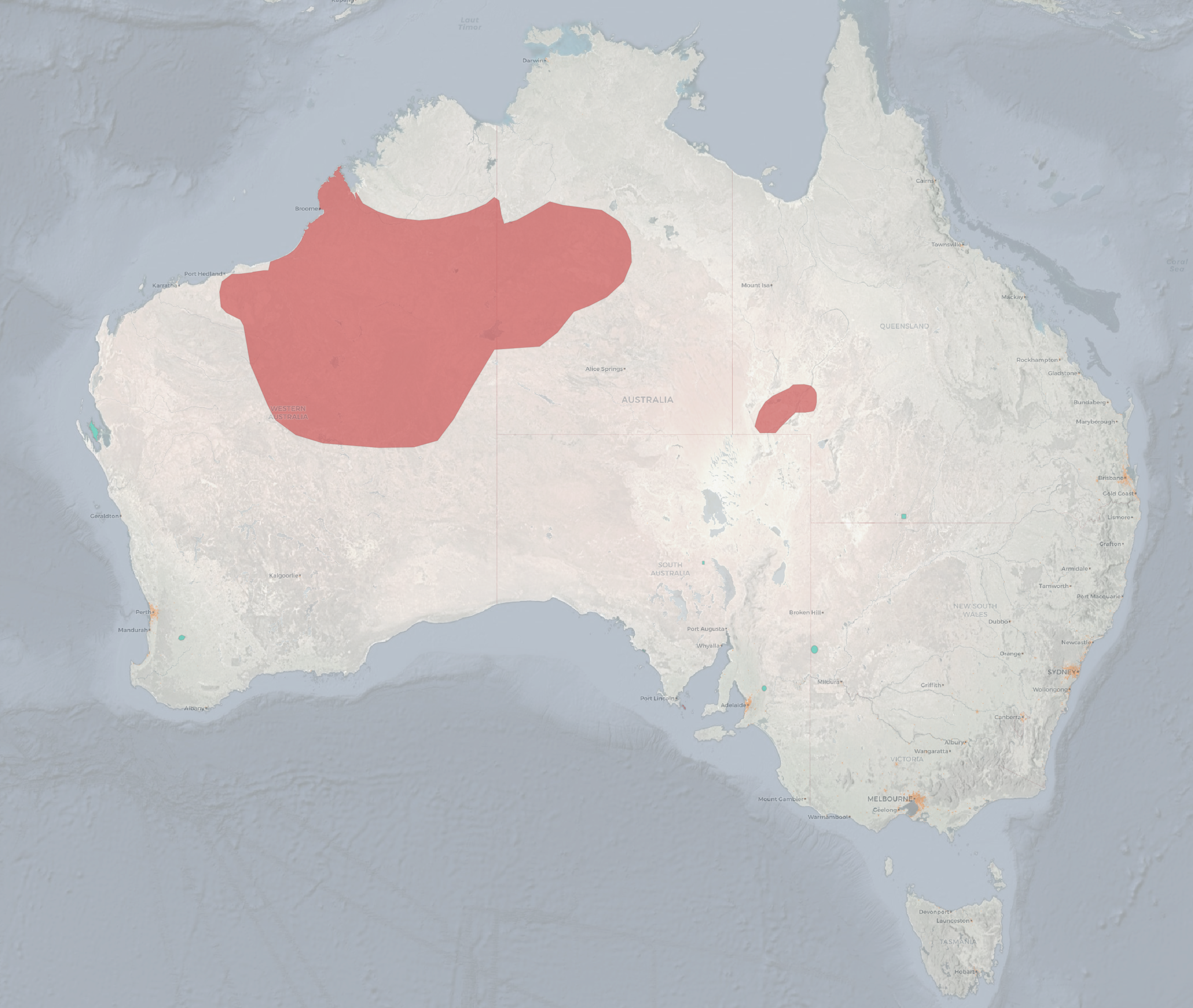
- Distribution of greater bilbies

= Greater bilby =

Species of marsupial

The greater bilby (Macrotis lagotis) or often simply bilby, is a long-eared, rabbit-like marsupial found in Australia. It lives in burrows and is active at night, feeding on insects, fruit, or fungi. Formerly widespread, bilbies are now restricted to parts of northwestern and central Australia due to threats like habitat loss, disease, and introduced predators such as foxes.

It is commonly now simply called bilby (or bilbies for plural) after the lesser bilby (Macrotis leucura) became extinct in the 1950s. Other names include dalgyte, pinkie, or rabbit-eared bandicoot.

== Etymology and other names ==
The term bilby is a loan word from the Yuwaalaraay Aboriginal language of northern New South Wales, meaning long-nosed rat. In Western Australia it is also known as dalgyte by the Noongar people from their word djalkat, and as ninu by the remote Kiwirrkurra people. The Wiradjuri of New South Wales also call it bilby. Other names include pinkie and rabbit-eared bandicoot. It is called mankarr by the Manjilijarra people of Western Australia.

== Taxonomy ==
=== Nomenclature ===
A scientific description of the greater bilby was first published in 1837 by a Mr J. Reid. Reid based his description on a specimen that he erroneously stated to have come from Van Diemen's Land (now Tasmania), where the species has not occurred in historical times. As all bandicoot species were then placed in a broadly circumscribed Perameles, Reid placed the bilby there too. However, noting how different it was from other members of the genus, he added that "should more of the same form be discovered, the above characters would constitute a subgenus to which the name of Macrotis might be applied". The specific epithet lagotis was chosen "from its resemblance to the Rabbit".

The following year, Richard Owen read a paper before the Zoological Society of London, in which he proposed to erect a new genus for this species, named Thylacomys. This name was widely adopted and remained in use for many years. Thus it was that when B. Arthur Bensley erected a subfamily to hold the genus in 1903, he named it Thylacomyinae. This name remains valid, and has since been promoted to family rank as Thylacomyidae, but Thylacomys itself is no longer considered valid, as Reid's original paper is held to have established the generic name Macrotis. Thus the currently accepted scientific name for the species is Macrotis lagotis.

=== Classification ===
The placement of bilbies within the Peramelemorphia has changed in recent years. Vaughan (1978) and Groves and Flannery (1990) both placed this family within the family Peramelidae. Kirsch et al. (1997) found them to be distinct from the species in Peroryctidae (which is now a subfamily in Peramelidae). McKenna and Bell (1997) also placed it in Peramelidae, but as the sister of Chaeropus in the subfamily Chaeropodinae.

== Description ==
Greater bilbies have the characteristics of long bandicoot muzzle and very long ears. They are about 29–55 centimetres (11–22 in) in length. Compared to bandicoots, they have a longer tail, bigger ears, and softer, silky fur. The size of their ears allows them to have better hearing as well. At 1 to 2.4 kilograms (2.2 to 5.3 lb), the male is about the same size as a rabbit; although male animals in good condition have been known to grow up to 3.7 kilograms (8.2 lb) in captivity. The female is smaller, and weighs around 0.8 to 1.1 kilograms (1.8 to 2.4 lb). Bilbies have an excellent sense of smell and sharp hearing. Their fur is blue-grey with patches of tan and is very soft. The tail is black and white with a distinct crest.

Unlike bandicoots, they are excellent burrowers and can build extensive tunnel systems with their strong forelimbs and well-developed claws. A bilby typically makes several burrows within its home range, up to about a dozen; and moves between them, using them for shelter both from predators and the heat of the day. The female bilby's pouch faces backward, which prevents it from getting filled with dirt while she is digging.

== Ecology ==
=== Habitat ===
Once widespread in arid, semi-arid and relatively fertile areas covering 70 per cent of mainland Australia, by 1995 the bilby was mostly restricted to arid areas and classed as a threatened species. Before the extreme contraction of its range to remote northern desert areas, the species was well known around Adelaide, especially in the city parklands, and was also recorded near Perth.

It makes its home in a burrow that spirals down, making it hard for its predators to get in. The bilby prefers arid habitats because of the spinifex grass and the acacia shrubs.

=== Diet ===
Greater bilbies are nocturnal omnivores that do not need to drink water, as they get all the moisture they need from their food, which includes insects and their larvae, seeds, spiders, termites, bulbs, fruit, fungi, and very small animals. Most food is found by digging or scratching in the soil, and using their long tongues.

They smell out witchetty grubs in roots of wattles and lancewood, and bite open the roots to get the grubs.

== Behaviour ==
Greater bilbies are generally solitary marsupials; however, there are some cases in which they travel in pairs. These pairs usually consist of two females, and these females are the sole caregivers of their offspring. Mating occurs between pairs of similar dominance, with females rebuffing lower-ranked males. Much of the plant diet of the bilby is facilitated by fires that occasionally run through Australian regions and facilitate the regrowth of plants that the bilby prefers. They are also a highly mobile species when it comes to foraging, with females travelling on average 1.5 km (0.9 mi) between burrows and males travelling up to 5 km (3.1 mi). The difference in male and female motility is most likely due to the fact that males are often in search of mates and need to only care for themselves, while females are responsible for their offspring and must work to support them. Communication remains difficult between bilbies due to poor eyesight, but since these marsupials usually live alone or in very small groups, this obstacle is not incredibly formidable. Any communication that does occur is mostly olfactory between males or auditory. The scent markings implemented by male bilbies primarily function as a mode of communication between members of the same sex, since female bilbies rarely take heed of such signals and males are never aggressive towards their female counterparts.

=== Life cycle ===
In captivity, bilbies typically live for at least six years with some specimens reaching ten years of age. However, wild caught bilbies tend to be less than 12 months old. Females become reproductively active at six months of age and can breed all year round if conditions are favourable.

Greater bilbies have a very short gestation period of about 12–14 days, one of the shortest among mammals. The young are 0.25 in (0.6 cm) long and very underdeveloped when they are born. They must crawl to the mother's pouch and latch onto one of her eight teats. They leave the pouch after 70–75 days and remain in the natal burrow for two to three weeks before becoming independent. Litters usually consist of one to three joeys and females can have up to four litters per year in favourable conditions.

== Aboriginal names ==
The Warumungu people of the Tennant Creek area call this animal warrikirti, and hunted it by digging up its burrows, or using "goanna dogs" (small dogs) to go down the burrows. The bilbies would then be caught by boomerang.

== Conservation ==
=== Status ===
Greater bilbies are a vulnerable species as classified by IUCN, their existence threatened by habitat loss and change as well as the competition with other animals. The main threats are cited as "Livestock farming & ranching" and "Invasive non-native/alien species/diseases". However, the biggest threat to the bilby is believed to be predation by introduced predators, such as red foxes, with changing fire regimes and pastoralism being landscape-scale variables that also impact bilby distribution and population. There is a national recovery plan for saving these animals: this program includes breeding in captivity, monitoring populations, and re-establishing bilbies where they once lived.

The species is also listed as vulnerable under the Commonwealth Environment Protection and Biodiversity Conservation Act 1999, with a species recovery plan published in 2007. Under state and territory legislation, it is extinct in New South Wales, endangered in Queensland, and vulnerable in the Northern Territory, South Australia and Western Australia.

Save the Bilby Fund CEO Kevin Bradley estimated in December 2021 that the animal had been pushed back to around 10% of their former range, which once covered 70% of mainland Australia.

In March 2026, the Australian Wildlife Conservancy announced four-fold population increase across sanctuaries it manages and partnership sites.

=== Conservation programs and efforts ===
The bilby has been popularised as a native alternative to the Easter Bunny by selling chocolate Easter Bilbies. Haigh's Chocolates in Adelaide made 950,000 chocolate bilbies between 1993 and Easter 2020, with proceeds donated to the Foundation for Rabbit-Free Australia, which does environmental work to protect the indigenous biodiversity of Australia. A National Bilby Day is held in Australia on the second Sunday in September to raise funds for conservation projects.

Reintroduction efforts have been successful in South Australia, with 16 bilbies released onto Thistle Island in 1997, and 9 released into the Arid Recovery Reserve near Roxby Downs in 2000. The Arid Recovery population's gene pool has been expanded by two additional releases in 2010 and 2020, the latter from the thriving population on Thistle Island. From 2001 to 2003, 19 bilbies were introduced into the Venus Bay Conservation Park at Venus Bay on the Eyre Peninsula. Bilbies have been bred at Monarto Zoo and (since 2009) at Cleland Wildlife Park.

Bilbies were also introduced into the Currawinya National Park in Queensland, with six bilbies released into the feral-free sanctuary in early February 2006. In July 2012 it was reported that the population at Currawinya has been affected by feral cats that had gained access into the protected area after the wire netting had rusted after flooding. The high-salinity flood water had pooled around sections of the fencing, and once parts of it had rusted the cats had entered the reserve through the holes. Surveys found no bilbies in April nor July, when the cats were discovered. As of July 2015 there were 75 bilbies ready to be released into the enclosure, but with at least six cats remaining after around 30 were culled, release was being held back.

The Charleville Bilby Experience at Charleville, Queensland, run by the Save the Bilby Fund, has a breeding program, with the first set of twins born in December 2021. Babies born here are sometimes transferred to Currawinya.

Successful reintroductions have also occurred onto Peron Peninsula in Western Australia as a part of Western Shield. Successful reintroductions have also occurred on other conservation lands, including islands and the Australian Wildlife Conservancy's Scotia and Yookamurra Sanctuaries. There is a highly successful bilby breeding program at Kanyana Wildlife Rehabilitation Centre, near Perth.

The knowledge of the Martu people of the Western Desert has been incorporated into models that predict bilby distributions.
