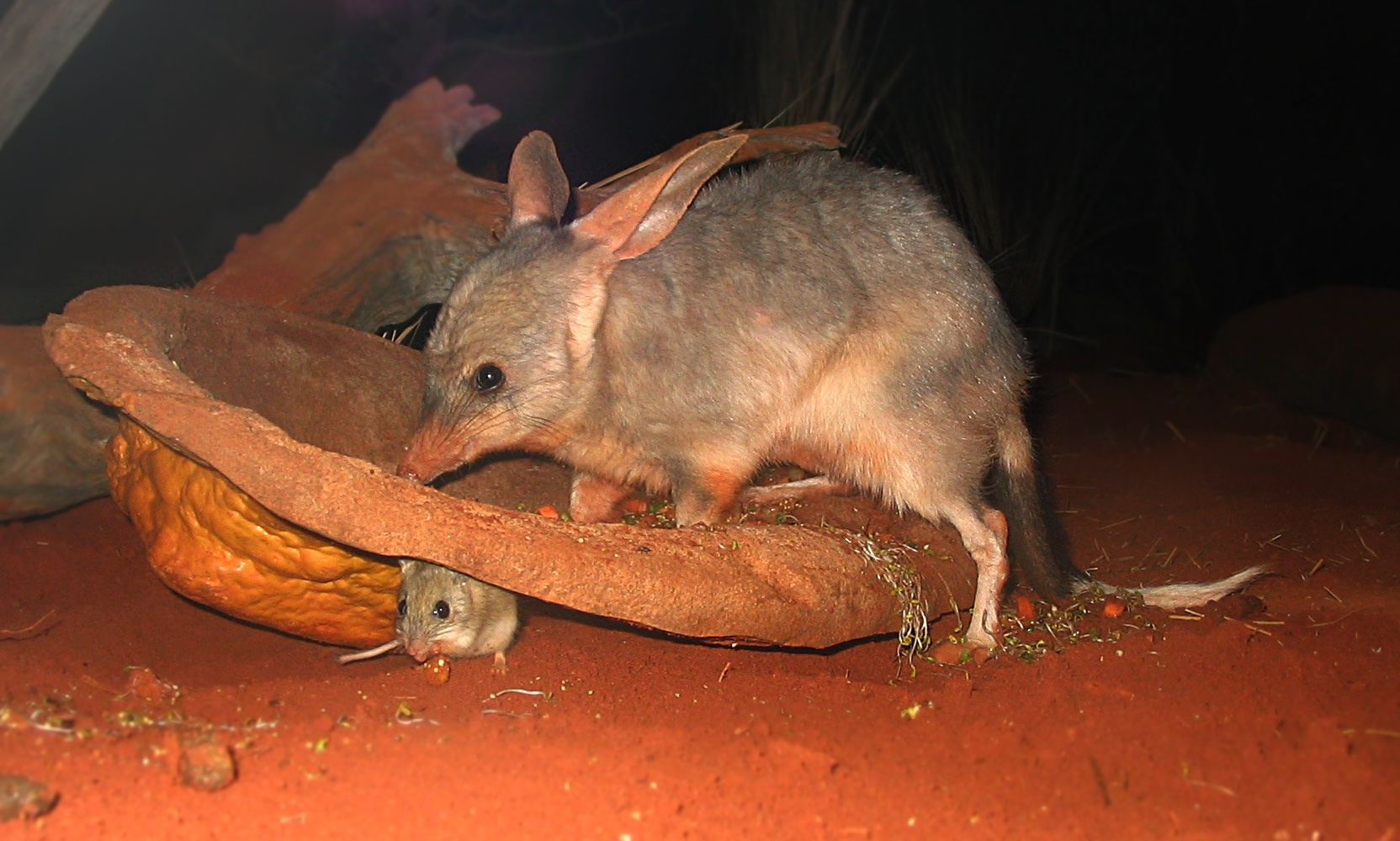
- Greater bilby

Scientific classification
- Kingdom: Animalia
- Phylum: Chordata
- Class: Mammalia
- Infraclass: Marsupialia
- Order: Peramelemorphia
- Family: Thylacomyidae; Bensley, 1903
- Genus: Macrotis; Reid, 1837

Type species
- Macrotis lagotis Reid, 1837

Species
- M. lagotis; †M. leucura
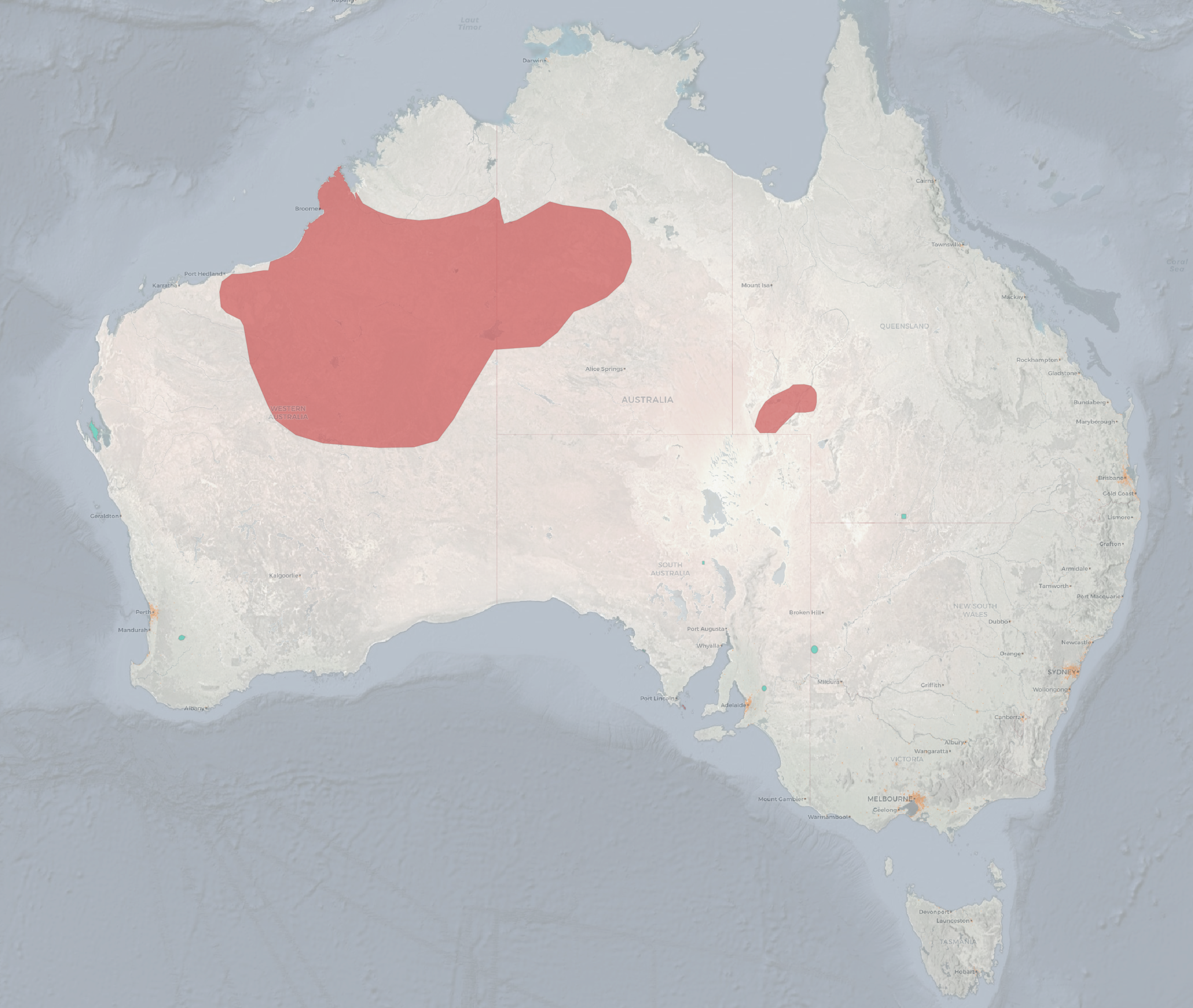
- Extant bilby distribution

Synonyms
- Paragalia Gray, 1841; Peragale Lydekker, 1887; Phalacomys anon., 1854; Thalaconus Richardson, Dallas, Cobbold, Baird and White, 1862; Thylacomys Blyth, 1840

= Macrotis =

Bilby

Genus of marsupials

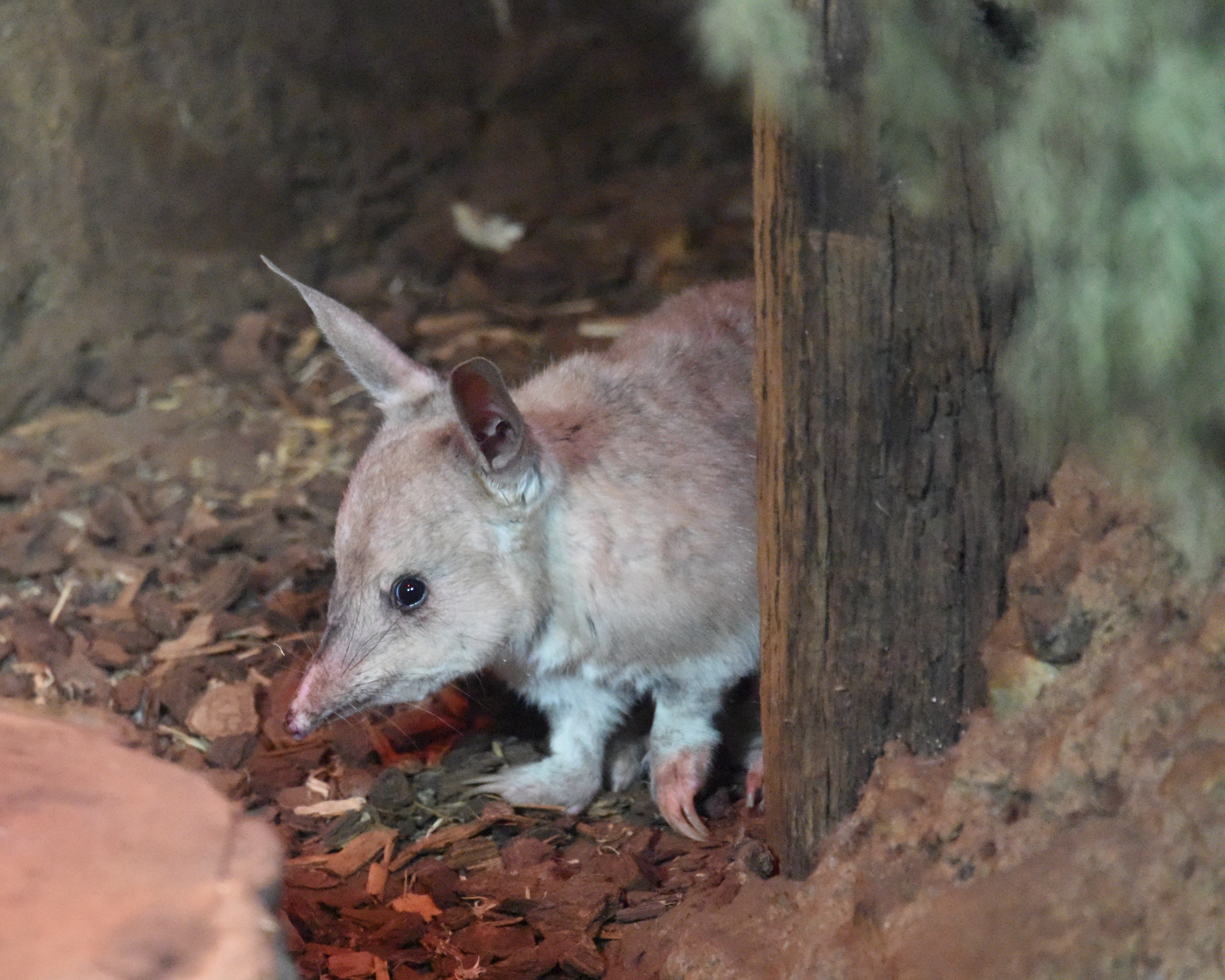
Bilby at Featherdale Wildlife Park

Macrotis is a genus of desert-dwelling marsupial omnivores known as bilbies or rabbit-bandicoots; they are members of the order Peramelemorphia.

At the time of European colonisation of Australia, there were two species. The lesser bilby became extinct in the 1950s; the greater bilby survives but remains endangered. It is currently listed as a vulnerable species. The greater bilby is on average 55 cm (22 in) long, excluding the tail, which is usually around 29 cm (11 in) long. Its fur is usually grey or white; it has a long, pointy nose and very long ears, hence the reference of its nickname to rabbits.

== Taxonomy ==
Macrotis means 'big-eared' (macro- + ōt- 'ear') in Greek, referring to the animal's large, long ears. The genus name was first proposed as a subgeneric classification, which after a century of taxonomic confusion was eventually stabilised as the accepted name in a 1932 revision by Ellis Troughton. In reviewing the systematic arrangement of the genus, Troughton recognised three species names, including one highly variable population with six subspecies.

The family's current name Thylacomyidae is derived from an invalid synonym Thylacomys, meaning 'pouched mouse', from the Ancient Greek thílakos (θύλακος, 'pouch, sack') and mys (μῦς, 'mouse, muscle'), sometimes misspelt Thalacomys.

The term bilby is a loanword from the Yuwaalaraay Aboriginal language of northern New South Wales, meaning long-nosed rat. It is known as dalgite in Western Australia, and in South Australia, pinkie is sometimes used. The Wiradjuri of New South Wales also call it "bilby". Gerard Krefft recorded the name Jacko used by the peoples of the lower Darling in 1864, emended to Jecko in 1866 along with Wuirrapur from the peoples at the lower Murray River.

=== Classification ===
The placement of the population within taxonomic classification has changed in recent years. Vaughan (1978) and Groves and Flannery (1990) both placed this family within the family Peramelidae. Kirsch et al. (1997) found them to be distinct from the species in Peroryctidae (which is now a subfamily in Peramelidae). McKenna and Bell (1997) also placed it in Peramelidae, but as the sister of Chaeropus in the subfamily Chaeropodinae.

Here is a summary of the treatment as a peramelemorph family:

- Thylacomyidae
  - Genus †Bulbadon Travouillon, Beck & Case 2021
    - ?†B. warburtonae Travouillon, Beck & Case 2021
  - Genus †Ischnodon Stirton 1955
    - †I. australis Stirton 1955
  - Genus †Liyamayi Travouillon et al. 2014
    - †L. dayi Travouillon et al. 2014
  - Genus Macrotis (Reid 1837)
    - M. lagotis (Reid 1837) Jentink 1887 (Greater bilby)
    - †M. leucura (Thomas 1887) Iredale & Troughton 1934 (Lesser bilby)

== Description ==
Bilbies have the characteristic long bandicoot muzzle and very big ears that radiate heat. They are about 29–55 cm (11–22 in) long. Compared to bandicoots, they have a longer tail, bigger ears, and softer, silky fur. The size of their ears allows them to have better hearing. They are nocturnal omnivores that do not need to drink water, as they obtain their moisture from food, which includes insects and their larvae, seeds, spiders, bulbs, fruit, fungi, and very small animals. Most food is found by digging or scratching in the soil, and using their very long tongues.

Unlike bandicoots, they are excellent burrowers and build extensive tunnel systems with their strong forelimbs and well-developed claws. A bilby typically makes a number of burrows within its home range, up to about a dozen, and moves between them, using them for shelter both from predators and the heat of the day. The female bilby's pouch faces backwards, which prevents the pouch from getting filled with dirt while she is digging.

Bilbies have a gestation of about 12–14 days, one of the shortest among mammals.

The appearance of the bilby has been alluded to as "Australia’s answer to the Easter rabbit".

== Conservation ==
Bilbies are slowly becoming endangered because of habitat loss and change, and competition with invasive animals such as foxes and cats. There is a national recovery plan being developed for saving them. This program includes captive breeding, monitoring populations, and reestablishing bilbies where they once lived. There have been reasonably successful moves to popularise the bilby as a native alternative to the Easter Bunny by selling chocolate Easter Bilbies (sometimes with a portion of the profits going to bilby protection and research). Reintroduction efforts have begun, with a successful reintroduction into the Arid Recovery Reserve in South Australia in 2000, and a reintroduction into Currawinya National Park in Queensland, where six bilbies were released into a predator-proof enclosure in April 2019.

Reintroductions have also occurred on the Peron Peninsula in Western Australia as a part of the Western Shield program, and at other conservation lands, including islands and the Australian Wildlife Conservancy's Scotia and Yookamurra Sanctuaries. Kanyana Wildlife Rehabilitation Centre near Perth, Western Australia runs a bilby breeding program.

== Evolution ==
The bilby lineage extends back 15 million years. In 2014 scientists found part of a 15-million-year-old fossilised jaw of a bilby which had shorter teeth that were probably used for eating forest fruit. Prior to this discovery, the oldest bilby fossil on record was 5 million years old. Modern bilbies have evolved to have long teeth used to dig holes in the desert to eat worms and insects.

It is thought the bilby diverged from its closest relative, an originally-carnivorous bandicoot, 20 million years ago.

== See also ==
- Australian fauna
- Bilby, a 2018 animated short film
