= Irena Sibley =

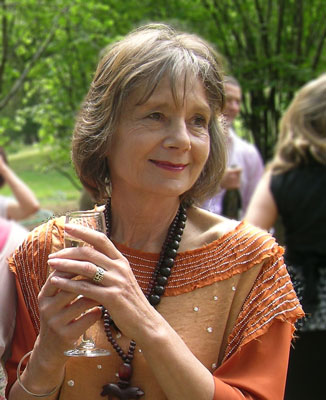
- Born: Irena Justina Pauliukonis; 16 June 1943; Lithuania
- Died: 29 March 2009 (aged 65); Australia
- Education: National Art School, Sydney
- Occupations: Artist, writer, illustrator, art teacher
- Years active: 1964–2009
- Known for: Children's book illustrations, environmental advocacy
- Notable work: The Bilbies' First Easter, When the Sun Took the Colours Away, Zara's Zoo
- Spouse: Andrew Sibley (m. 1967)
- Children: 2

Irena Sibley (16 June 1943 – 29 March 2009), born Irena Justina Pauliukonis, was an Australian artist, writer, illustrator of children's books, and art teacher.

== Personal life ==
Her mother Anele and father Zenonas Pauliukonis fled communist-occupied Lithuania in 1946 when Irena was a baby. The Pauliukonis family immigrated to Australia via refugee camps in Freiburg, Germany, where her brother Vidas was born, and Naples, Italy. The family arrived in Sydney, Australia on 31 December 1949 and settled in Bathurst, before establishing their family home in Cabramatta in Sydney's western suburbs.

Irena Pauliukonis married artist Andrew Sibley in 1967 and had two sons, Benedict and Jonathan. The Sibley family lived in Albert Park, where she was involved in the Save Albert Park protest movement against the Australian Grand Prix in the 1990s.

The Sibley family established a property and artists' studio in Flowerdale, Victoria in the 1970s and 1980s, with spectacular terraced gardens which have been featured in House & Garden magazine. The property was successfully defended by the family from the Black Saturday (2009) bushfires, with only minor damage sustained, due largely to a sprinkler system and the strategic planting of fire retardant vegetation.

== Career ==
Irena Sibley graduated in Fine Arts in 1964 from the National Art School in Sydney. In 1967, she established the art department at Burke Hall (a preparatory junior school of Xavier College) in Melbourne, and taught there on and off for 13 years. She was an art teacher at Firbank Girls' Grammar School from 1982 to 2007.

Her first book, Rainbow, was published in 1980, as both a children's book and hand-made Artist's Book, and her children's books have included the best-selling The Bilbies' First Easter, When the Sun Took the Colours Away (1991), and Zara's Zoo, (2001). Sibley's art works are held in the collections of the State Library of Victoria and the National Library of Australia, as well as many private collections.

Sibley has published over a dozen children's books, six handmade limited-edition books, and many bookplates for private collectors. Her artwork employs a range of techniques, including hand-coloured linocuts, scratchboard, and, later in her career, acrylic painting. Stylistically, her work can reflect Eastern European printmaking traditions, as well as contemporary representations of Australia's natural environment.

=== Easter Bilby Works ===
Irena Sibley was a passionate environmentalist, with a love for Australia's native flora and fauna. This love is reflected in many of her works, particularly An Alphabet of Australian Wildflowers (1988) and her Easter Bilby series. Irena Sibley believed that rabbits pose a serious threat to Australia's natural environment (see Environmental issues in Australia) and supported moves to replace the Easter Bunny with the "Easter Bilby" in Australian Easter celebrations.

Sibley produced three Easter Bilby books between 1994 and 2000, the best-selling The Bilbies' First Easter (1994), The Bilby and the Bunyip (1998) and Grandma Bilby Mr Budge and the Easter Tree (2000).

== List of works ==
=== Written and illustrated children's books ===
- Rainbow, Gryphon Books 1980
- The Other Tansy, Sugar and Snails 1985
- William the Wizard Who Wasn’t, Five Mile Press 1986
- When Herb’s Mess Grew, Reed Heinemann 1990
- When the Sun Took the Colours Away, Heinemann 1992
- The Bilbies First Easter, Silver Gum Press 1994
- The Bird Woman, Silver Gum Press 1995
- The Bilby and the Bunyip, Lothian 1998
- Grandma Bilby Mr Budge and the Easter Tree, Lothian 2000
- Zara’s Zoo, an Abcedaria, Lothian 2001
- Greta the Garbo Lothian 2002

=== Illustrated children's books ===
- The Trouble with Peggety (author: Mary Small), Roo books 1984
- The Last Voyage of the Araminta (author Lynne Duncan), Sensicorn Books, 1985
- The Lady Down the Road (author Jill Morris), Silver Gum Press 1994
- The Wish Flower (author: Jen McVeity), Heinemann 1996
- In Big Trouble (author: Dianne Bates), Zipper books 1996

=== Handmade limited-edition books ===
- Rainbow, 1980
- William the Wizard Who Wasn’t (three variations), 1985, 1986
- The Calming of Harry, 1987
- An Alphabet of Australian Wildflowers, 1988
- When Herb’s Mess Grew, 1989
- When the Sun Took the Colours Away, 1991

=== Other works ===
- Self Portrait of the Artist's Wife, Lytlewode Press 2007
- Ode to Living Things (author: Lynne Strahan Duncan) 2009

== Collections and awards ==
Irena Sibley's limited-edition books and original artworks are held in many private collections in Australia, Europe, Japan, and the U.S., and in public collections including:

- Firbank Girls' Grammar School
- National Library of Australia
- State Library of Queensland
- University of Melbourne
- State Library of New South Wales (Mitchell Wing)
- State Library of Victoria

In 2008, Sibley claimed the Keith Wingrove Award, a national accolade that recognises excellence in book plate art and design. Sibley received the book plate award for her work for artist Charles Blackman.

== Image gallery ==
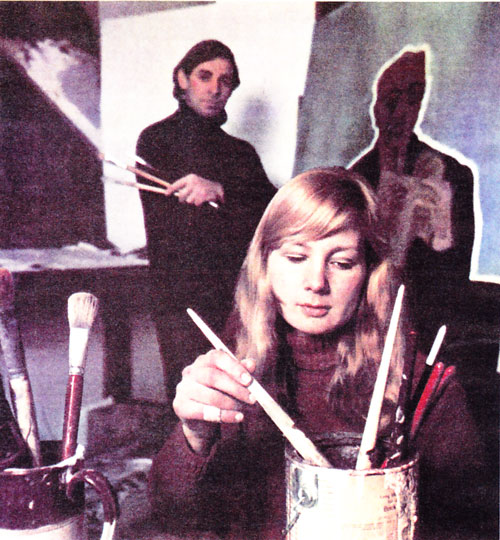
Irena cleaning husband Andrew's brushes, Women's Day, p.15 July 3, 1972. Photograph by Gianni Marzella.
