= Rausch Schokoladen =

German chocolate manufacturer

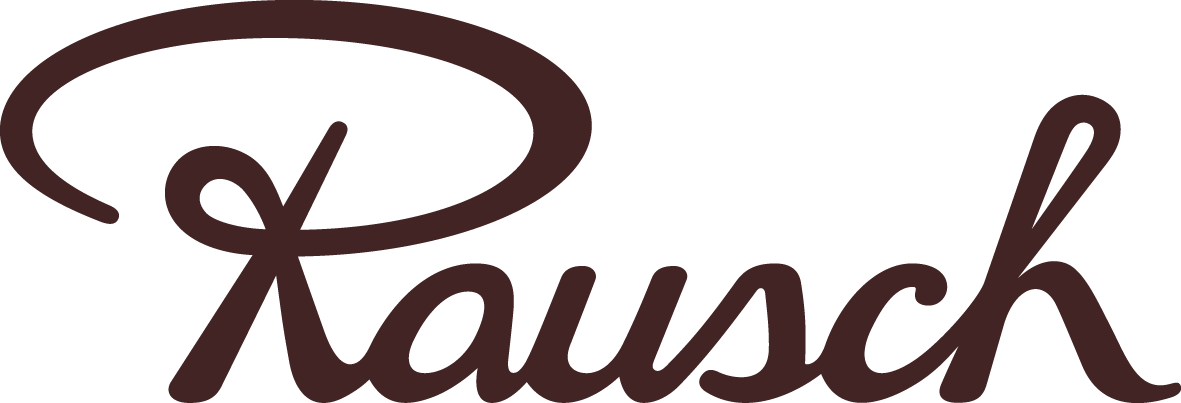
- Type: GmbH
- Industry: Chocolate
- Founded: 1918
- Headquarters: Berlin
- Key people: Robert Rausch, Rico Rühmer, Thomas Seeliger
- Revenue: 125 million euros (2012)
- Number of employees: 400 (2015)
- Website: https://rausch.de/en

Rausch Schokoladen is a German chocolate manufacturer headquartered in Berlin, founded in 1918 by Wilhelm Rausch as a confectionery. The company specialises in the production and distribution of high-quality chocolates made from fine cocoa.

== History ==
Wilhelm Rausch, son of a master confectioner and chocolatier, opened the Rausch Private Confectionery in Berlin in 1918, producing pralines, chocolates, and honey cakes. Wilhelm Rausch operated seven of his own confectionery shops in Berlin. His three children continued the business. In 1968, to mark the company's fiftieth anniversary, a new chocolate factory was opened at Wolframstraße 95-96 in Berlin-Tempelhof. A factory outlet store was also located there, which was closed in 2017 to accommodate more production space.

In 1971, Jürgen Rausch, Gerhard Rausch's son, joined the company and took over management ten years later. In 1982, he had a second chocolate factory built in Peine to produce fine chocolate. In 1998, Rausch SchokoLand was built there, featuring a chocolate museum, a chocolate café, a demonstration production facility, one of the world's largest chocolate volcano at the time, and a factory outlet. The museum also housed what was once the world's largest chocolate Easter bunny.

In 1989, Rausch acquired Fassbender, the former Prussian court purveyor, which had existed since 1863, along with all of its recipes. In 1999, Rausch opened the Fassbender & Rausch shop at Gendarmenmarkt in Berlin-Mitte. With nearly 2,000 square meters of retail space, it is the largest chocolate house in Europe.

Since 2015, the company has been run by Robert Rausch, the fifth generation of the family.

In order to meet its own high standards for fine cocoa quality, Rausch established its own research plantation for fine cocoa in Costa Rica in 2014.

In July 2023, Rausch opened a chocolate house in Peine. It includes a café, a museum, a factory outlet and 52 electric charging stations, 40 of which were built in cooperation with Tesla. The remaining twelve stations belong to the electricity provider EnBW.

== Company ==
Since 2015, Rausch chocolate has only been available, with the exception of the discount store products, in the company's online shop and in its own chocolate shops at Gendarmenmarkt in Berlin and in Peine, and no longer in stationary retail outlets. The strategy pursued by the company is called Tree-to-Door. This means that Rausch controls everything from the cultivation of the cocoa and the production of the chocolate to delivery to the customer.

== Products ==
The product range includes chocolate confectionery. In addition to chocolate bars, there are pralines and seasonal products such as chocolate Santa Clauses and Easter bunnies, as well as chocolate made from single-origin fine cocoa, the Rausch Plantation Chocolates.

In 2000, a product line was introduced under the brand name "Plantation Chocolate," in which each variety consists exclusively of fine cocoa from a specific region of origin.

Rausch produces chocolate products for the Lidl retail chain under the brand names J.D. Gross, Mister Choc, Deluxe, and Favorina (J.D.G Fine Food GmbH, Stederdorf (Peine)). The “discount chocolate” produced for Lidl accounts for approximately 90% of Rausch’s total sales in 2018 and thus forms the company’s mainstay.
