= Chocolate bunny =

Piece of chocolate in the shape of a rabbit

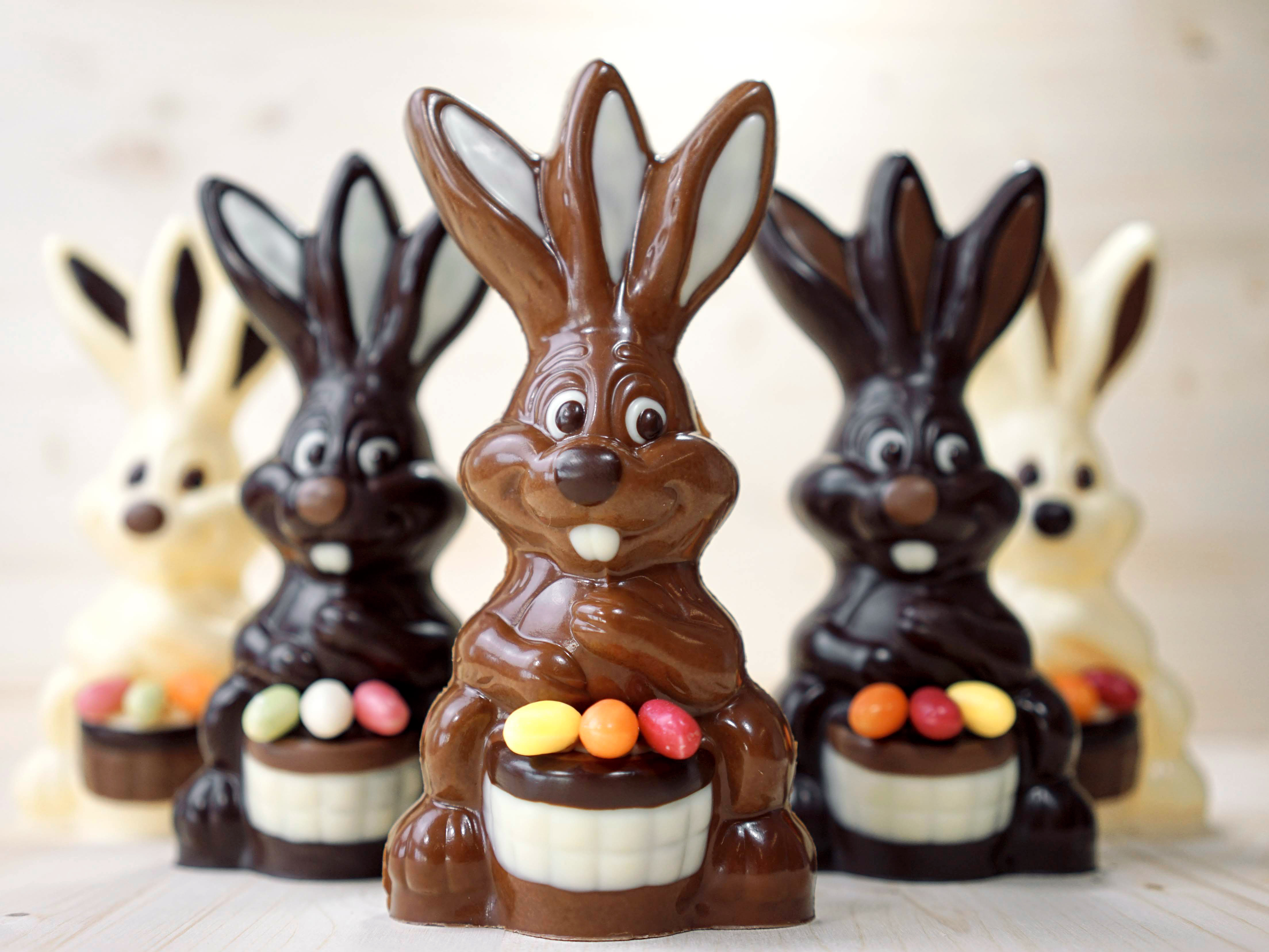
Chocolate rabbits

A chocolate bunny or chocolate rabbit is a piece of chocolate in the shape of a rabbit, usually stylized, and generally hollow. The cocoa confection is related to the religious Easter holiday that occurs annually around the months of March and April. The chocolate shaped bunny can be wrapped in a colorful tin-foil, a decorated box, or simply the chocolate itself.

== History ==
The notable Easter Bunny was introduced to Christians by German folklore in the early 13th century. Stories of an egg-laying white hare fostered the popular egg and rabbit Easter theme and traditions. In the Bible, rabbits are known for being a sign of fertility and new life in which the chocolate bunny now denotes to. Chocolate bunny molds are believed to have been first introduced in Germany and later brought to America. By the early 1920s chocolate bunnies became a household tradition in the United States to commemorate the holiday.

== Preparation ==
Two separate bunny-shaped molds are filled with chocolate, which will later be connected to create the common hollow chocolate bunny shape. Once the molds are filled, machines shake the chocolate around to ensure complete and even filling. Many companies often wrap the hardened chocolate bunny in decorated foil to ensure freshness, while still being festive. The bunnies often come in cardboard and plastic packaging to ensure the delicate chocolate does not break.

== Sales ==
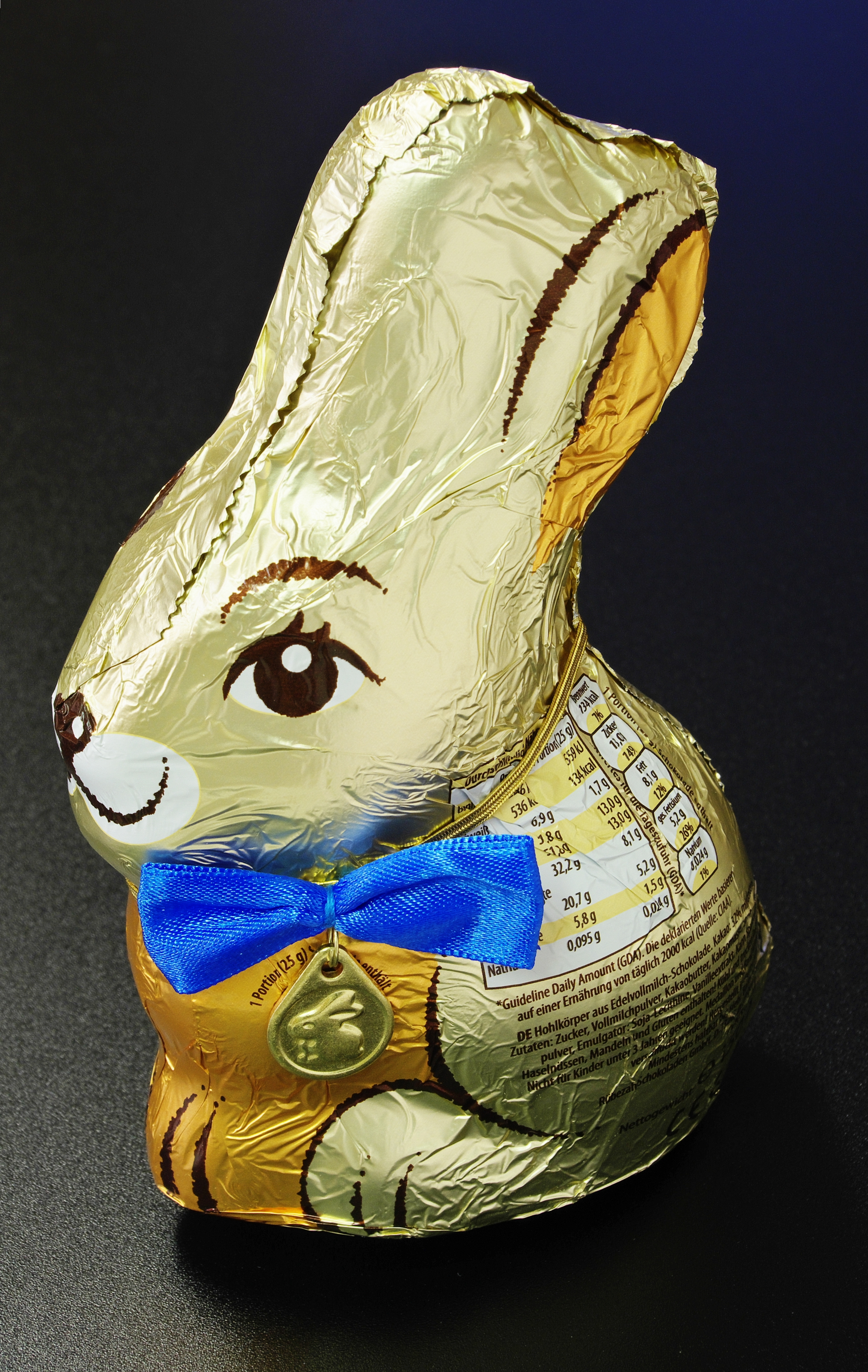
A chocolate bunny in a colorful foil wrapper

Chocolate is one of the most commonly sold treats around the national Easter Holiday; in some years, chocolate sales can surpass $400 million a few weeks before the holiday. Chocolate bunnies can be found for sale in many drugstores and grocery stores in America a few months or weeks leading up to Easter. The religious holiday comes in second place, after Halloween, for selling the most candy during a holiday season. Today, the chocolate bunny is a staple for many Easter baskets around the world. More than 50% of people in the United States prefer chocolate bunnies and eggs over other candies as their choice of an Easter treat. Due to their overwhelming popularity, over 90 million chocolate bunnies are produced yearly for consumers in the United States.

== Controversy ==
A 2011 article in the Medical Journal of Australia criticised the Easter bunny's use in marketing to children. The author was concerned this could encourage overconsumption, harming children's health.

In 2000, Lindt’s chocolate bunny was granted trademark status. This has led to several legal battles, including in 2011 against Hauswirth in a Vienna court, and by the supermarket Lidl in Switzerland.

== See also ==
- Easter Bilby
