= Georg Franck von Franckenau =

German botanist (1643–1704)

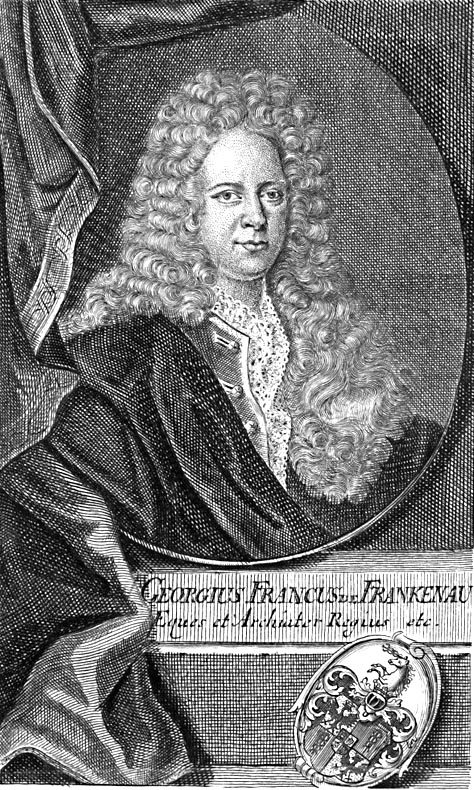
Georg Franck von Franckenau

Georg Franck von Franckenau (3 May 1643, in Naumburg (Saale) – 17 June 1704, in Copenhagen) was a German physician and botanist.

== Life ==
Georg Franck studied medicine and anatomy in Strasbourg, he received his M.D. in 1666.

He was Teacher of Anatomy, Chemistry and Botany at Jena and became Professor of Medicine at the University of Heidelberg in 1679. He was Personal Physician to the Margrave of Baden, the Duke of Württemberg and the Archbishop of Trier. Due to a French invasion in the War of the Palatinate Succession he left Heidelberg for Frankfurt and then University of Wittenberg.

In 1692 he was knighted by Leopold I, Holy Roman Emperor and on 30 November 1693 he became a Fellow of the Royal Society. He later moved to Denmark as personal physician to Christian V in Copenhagen, where he died on 17 June 1704.

== Work ==
- Flora Francica Aucta, oder vollständiges Kräuter-Lexicon,… (1680, Flora der Pfalz)
- Disputatione ordinaria disquirens de ovis paschalibus / von Oster-Eyern (1682), mentions the Easter Hare and Easter eggs
