= Andrew Sibley =

Australian painter

Andrew John Sibley (9 July 1933 – 3 September 2015) was an English-born Australian artist. Sibley has been the subject of three books and is commonly listed in histories and encyclopedias of Australian art as a significant figurative painter of the mid and late 20th century.

== Personal history ==
Sibley was born in Adisham, Kent, England, the first child to John Percival and Marguerite Joan Sibley (née Taylor). With his family home bombed in the London Blitz, Sibley was relocated to Sittingbourne, Kent, then moving to Northfleet, Kent. In 1944, Sibley was awarded a scholarship at Gravesend School of Art, where he studied with fellow students including English artist Peter Blake.

In 1948, with his parents and two brothers, Sibley emigrated to Australia, where they lived and worked on an orchard in the rural town of Stanthorpe, Queensland. He left the farm in 1951 to undertake National Service Training with the Royal Australian Navy, after which he spent a short time living and working in Port Moresby, Papua New Guinea.

After meeting his future wife Irena Sibley (née Pauliukonis) in Brisbane in 1967, Sibley followed her to Sydney, where they were married in 1968. The Sibleys moved to Victoria, where he lived and worked until his death on 3 September 2015 at the age of 82.

== Career overview ==
From his early success in the 1960s, Andrew Sibley consistently exhibited throughout Australia and internationally. His work is represented in all major national, state and regional collections in Australia as well as private collections in Australia, Europe, Asia and the United States. Over his 58-year career as an artist, Sibley achieved strong commercial and critical success as well as recognition as a finalist or being awarded numerous major art prizes.

=== Early career ===
Sibley commenced his formal painting career in Brisbane during the latter half of the 1950s alongside notable artists such as Roy Churcher, Jon Molvig and Ian Fairweather, Brian Johnston, Charles Blackman and Clifton Pugh. In 1960, Sibley had his first solo exhibition at Rowes Arcade Gallery. In 1962, Sibley received the Transfield Art Prize (Australia's largest) with his painting The Bathers. He subsequently had solo exhibitions at Macquarie Galleries, Sydney, and South Yarra Galleries, Melbourne and at Rudy Komon Gallery, Sydney, alongside artists of that time including Jon Molvig, Robert Dickerson and Leonard French.

In 1963, Sibley was again shortlisted in numerous prizes and had a work selected to be exhibited at the Tate Gallery, London, followed by inclusion in the Paris Biennale in that year. In 1967, Sibley accepted a full-time position as a painting lecturer at RMIT, a position he would go on to hold until 1987 when he became Head of Painting at Monash University. In 1968, the first book on the artist was written by Rodney Hall, titled Focus on Andrew Sibley.

In 1965, Sibley was included in an exhibition titled "Young Australian Painters" that toured Japan. In 1967, his work was included in an exhibition titled "Australian Painters 1964–1966" at the Corcoran Gallery of Art, Washington DC, USA, and then in 1970 he had work included in an exhibition titled "Miniaturen '70 International" at Gallerie 66 h.g.Krupp, Hoffheim am Taunus, West Germany.

=== Mid-career ===
Following an exhibition at Gallerie 66 in 1970, Sibley participated in the Berliner Kunstler Programme in Berlin. A new body of work was again shown at Gallerie 66, this time in a solo exhibition. On returning to Australia the connection to Germany, and Europe more broadly, remained, with his work being exhibited at the Arts Fair, Markburg-Lahn, West Germany in 1974. His connection to Europe continued, with his work included in an exhibition titled Mensch und Roum at Epstein Gallery, West Germany in 1975; a touring show through Europe by the National Gallery of Victoria titled Australian Artists in 1976 and in 1986 & 1987 Sibley had two solo exhibitions at Gerstman-Abdallah Fine Arts at their exhibition space in Cologne, West Germany.

The University of Melbourne Gallery produced a mid-career survey exhibition, curated by Betty Churcher, with a catalogue essay by Ronald Millar. In this exhibition many of the new techniques and influences were on full display including Sibley's iconic perspex paintings.

The 1980s saw the Circus series of paintings exhibited in Sydney (Rudy Komon Gallery), Canberra (Solander Gallery) and Melbourne (Realities Gallery). In 1986, the National Gallery of Australia purchased six drawings by Sibley.

Sibley travelled extensively through his mid-career and these experiences had appreciable impact on the subject of his work. Most notably in 1978, Sibley took leave from RMIT to visit India and in 1980, he travelled to Arnhem Land, Northern Territory, staying with indigenous artists of the Gunbalanya (Oenpelli) community.

=== Late career ===
In 2001, Sibley took part in an expedition to Lake Eyre in South Australia, along with nine other artists (John Olsen, Tim Storrier, Robert Jacks, David Larwill, Jefferey Makin, Hazel Dooney, et al.) which resulted in a book, William Creek and Beyond, a film documentary and a touring exhibition.

Following the death of his wife Irena Sibley, Sibley joined Kick Gallery in Melbourne in 2012, where he exhibited until his death in 2015.

== Collections ==
Andrew Sibley's work is in the collection of:

- National Gallery of Australia
- National Gallery of Victoria
- Art Gallery of New South Wales
- Queensland Art Gallery
- Art Gallery of South Australia
- Art Gallery of Western Australia
- National Portrait Gallery (Australia)
- Parliament House, Canberra
- Australian Embassy Collection, Washington
- Tarrawarra Museum of Art
- Artbank, Sydney
- State and regional galleries throughout Australia
- Private collections in Australia and abroad
