= Easter Bilby =

Australian holiday character

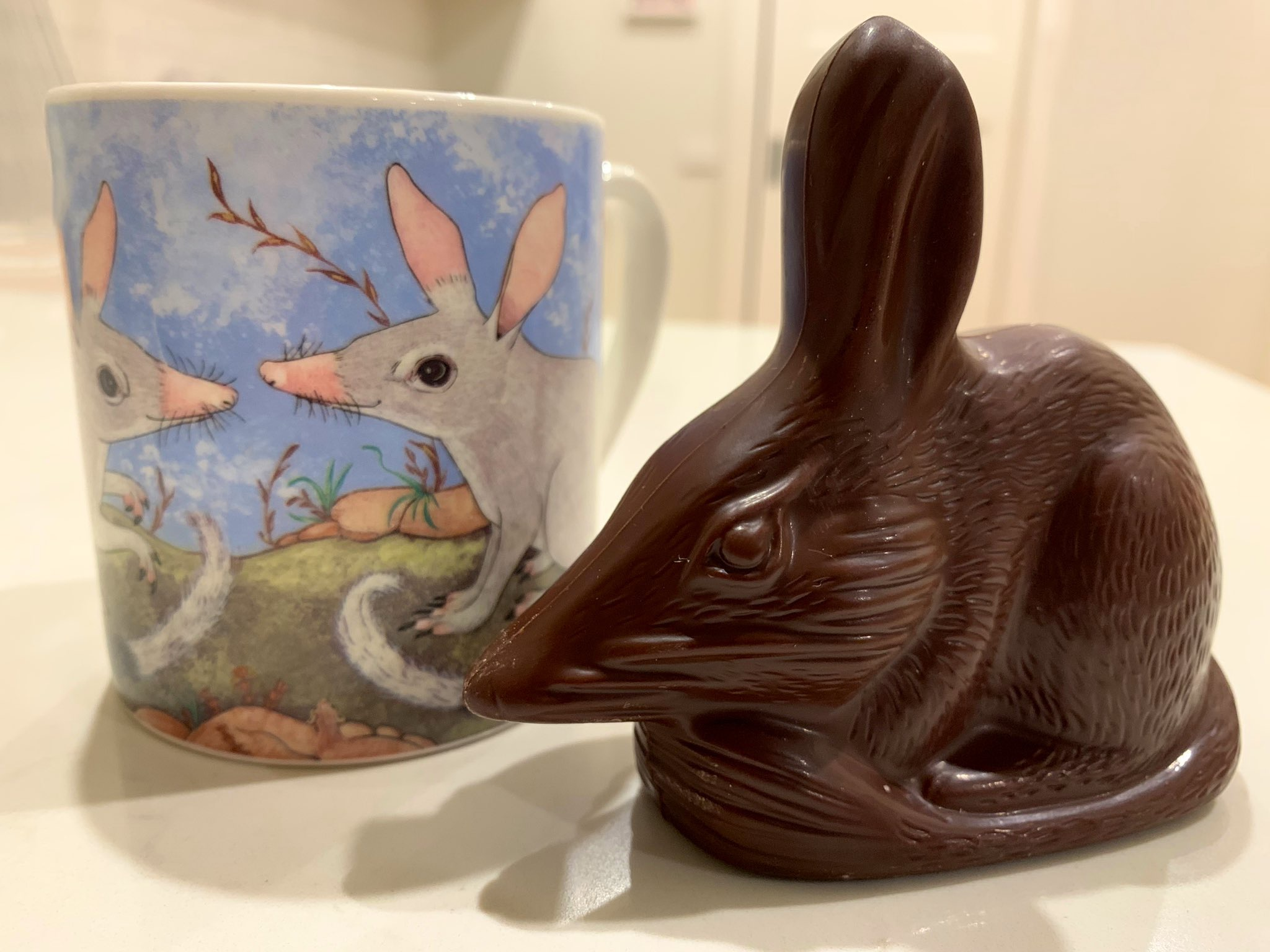
A bilby made of chocolate with other bilbies printed on a mug

The Easter Bilby is an Australian alternative to the Easter Bunny and chocolate bunnies. Bilbies are native Australian marsupials that are endangered. To raise money and increase awareness of conservation efforts, bilby-shaped chocolates and related merchandise are sold within many stores throughout Australia as an alternative to Easter bunnies.

== Concept and stories ==
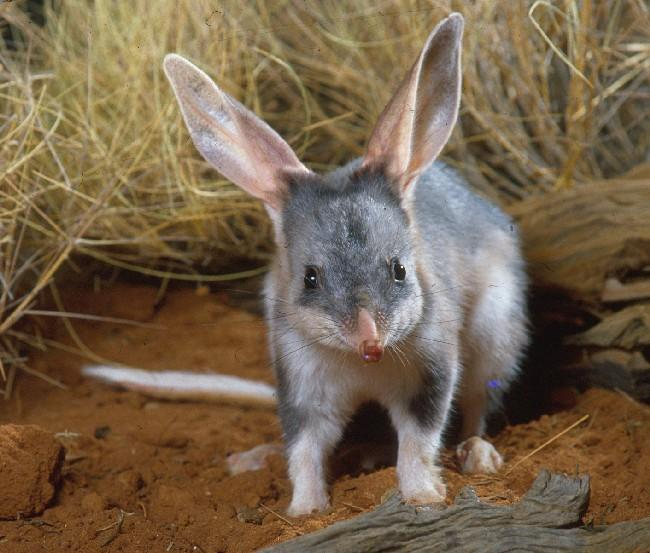
A greater bilby (Macrotis lagotis)

The Easter Bilby concept emerged a number of times in the mid-late 20th century. In March 1968, a 9-year-old schoolgirl, Rose-Marie Dusting, wrote a story titled "Billy the Aussie Easter Bilby", which was published in 1997. The story helped catalyze the public's interest in saving the bilby. The tradition of an Easter Bilby providing Easter eggs began in the Hawthorn Junior Field Naturalists Club between 1976 and 1983 thanks to Malcolm Turner, while Tony Robinson of the South Australian National Parks Service, has also been credited with suggesting the Easter Bilby as a substitute for the Easter Bunny around 1980. In 1991, Nicholas Newland from the campaign group Foundation for Rabbit-Free Australia also promoted the idea of the Easter Bilby to raise awareness about the environmental damage that accidentally introduced rabbits cause and to replace the Easter Bunny with true native wildlife.

In 1993, Australian children's author Jeni Bright wrote a story called Burra Nimu, the Easter Bilby. It tells how Burra, a shy but brave bilby, decides to save the land from the rabbits and foxes who are ruining it. It is illustrated by Australian illustrator Janet Selby.

Australian children's book author and illustrator Irena Sibley produced three Easter Bilby books between 1994 and 2000, including the best selling The Bilbies' First Easter, published by Silver Gum Press in 1994.

In 1994, Ali Garnett and Kaye Kessing produced an ‘Easter Bilby’ children’s book with the support of Foundation for Rabbit-Free Australia and the Australian Government’s Department of the Environment and Heritage. It was followed by the ‘Easter Bilby Action Pack’ the following year, and ‘Easter Bilby’s Secret’ in 1999. A related Easter Bilby pantomime was also produced and performed in several capital cities around Australia.

In 2024, Banjo Frog's Concert Spectacular by Kristin Martin and Bianca Richardson was published as a successor to Ali Garnett and Kaye Kessing's Easter Bilby books, with support from the Foundation for Rabbit Free Australia. This picture book highlights the issues caused by rabbits in Australia, with the Easter Bilby as a hero recruiting children to help save the native wildlife.

== Chocolate bilbies ==
The first chocolate Easter Bilbies were sold at the Warrawong Sanctuary when it was owned by John Wamsley, and were produced by Melba Chocolates in Woodside. Walmsley had successfully bred bilbies at the sanctuary.

Chocolate manufacturers that donate towards bilby conservation include Pink Lady and Haigh's Chocolates. In 2014, Pink Lady donated 30 cents from every large bilby sale and $1 from every 10 pack. Parent company Fyna Foods manufactures chocolate bilbies as well as other iconic Australian fauna in their Australian Bush Friends Easter chocolate. 20 cents from every Bush Friends collection is donated to the Save the Bilby Fund. 2015 saw these chocolates raise over $33,000 to the fund.

In 2003, funds from the sale of chocolate bilbies were used to build a 20 km (10 mile) long predator-proof fence in Currawinya National Park.

Darrell Lea began selling chocolate bilbies in 1999. As of 2009, sales of Darrell Lea's bilbies were about the same as their sales of bunnies. From 1999 to 2008, Darrell Lea raised $300,000 towards the Save the Bilby Fund. Prior to their store closures in 2012, Darrell Lea donated approximately $60,000 per year to the Save the Bilby Fund from the sales of the Darrell Lea chocolate bilbies.

For three years prior to 2018, Cadbury donated $10,000 per year to the Save the Bilby Fund, although they were not an official partner. As of 2018, the Cadbury bilbies were discontinued, resulting in major supermarkets Coles and Woolworths not stocking any chocolate bilbies.

As of 2017, consumers were urged to buy chocolate bilbies with a green tag, signifying that the sale raises funds for the bilby. Nevertheless, research has shown that throughout the 2010s the concept of the Easter bilby has seen decreased interest in Australia, as shown by online searches and mentions in major newspapers. This, coupled with changes in the Australian chocolate industry, including the decision of Cadbury and Darrell Lea to stop making chocolate bilbies, has meant that the Easter bilby is increasingly a niche product, removed from mainstream Australian culture. In 2019, Cadbury announced it will no longer make the chocolate bilbies, and no major supermarkets carried them.

In 2022, Darrell Lea started making chocolate bilbies again after an eight-year hiatus.

== See also ==
- Rabbits in Australia
