= Liyamayi =

Liyamayi dayi

Scientific classification
- Kingdom: Animalia
- Phylum: Chordata
- Class: Mammalia
- Infraclass: Marsupialia
- Order: Peramelemorphia
- Family: Thylacomyidae
- Genus: †Liyamayi
- Species: †L. dayi

Binomial name
- †Liyamayi dayi Travouillon, Hand, Archer and Black, 2014

Fossil genus of mammal

Liyamayi dayi is a mammal species of the Thylacomyidae family known from fossils located at the Riversleigh World Heritage Area in northeast Australia. The discovery of the specimens was identified as deposited around fifteen million years ago, revising the earliest record of this peramelemorphian lineage from those of species that existed around ten million years later.

== Taxonomy ==
A fossil species assigned to a new genus, Liyamayi, in a description by researchers at the Riversleigh fossil area, K. J. Travouillon, S. J. Hand, M. Archer and K. H. Black, who identified distinctions in the dentition from other named genera, for a new species of Riversleigh fauna was published in 2014, the authors proposing the specific epithet for Robert Day in gratitude for support toward the research project. The gender of the genus name Liyamayi is stated to be masculine, and combines two terms from the Waanyi language, spoken by peoples of the Riversleigh region, liya and mayi, in reference to the "round tooth" that distinguishes the genus.

== Description ==
A genus known by a single species, Liyamayi dayi is recognised as an early representative of a thylacomyid lineage that is separated from the Chaeropodidae, a family represented by the modern pig-footed bandicoots Chaeropus, and the Peramelidae family of extant bandicooots.

The estimates of body mass are from around 650 grams to less than one kilogram. The holotype and only known specimen is a section of the animal's right maxillary with remaining evidence of intact molars M1–M3 and alveoli of the fourth molar.

== Distribution and habitat ==
The distribution of Liyamayi dayi is restricted to Riversleigh, an area rich in series of well preserved fossil mammals. The only known location of specimens is Rick's Sausage Site at Riversleigh, a poorly studied site which is probably middle Miocene, Riversleigh Faunal Zone C approximately 15 mya, at that time part of the wet rainforest that dominated the Riversleigh area. The fauna discovered at the same site support the evidence of a local wet rainforest environment. Finding evidence of the lineage, known from other sites and thought to have diversified in other regions, implies they were establishing themselves in the region as the local ecology responded to a drier climate.
