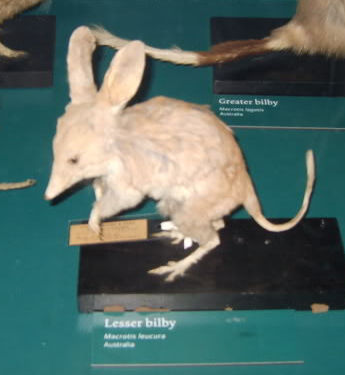
- A stuffed lesser bilby specimen at Tring Museum

Conservation status
- Extinct (1960s) (IUCN 3.1)

Scientific classification
- Kingdom: Animalia
- Phylum: Chordata
- Class: Mammalia
- Infraclass: Marsupialia
- Order: Peramelemorphia
- Family: Thylacomyidae
- Genus: Macrotis
- Species: †M. leucura

Binomial name
- †Macrotis leucura Thomas, 1887
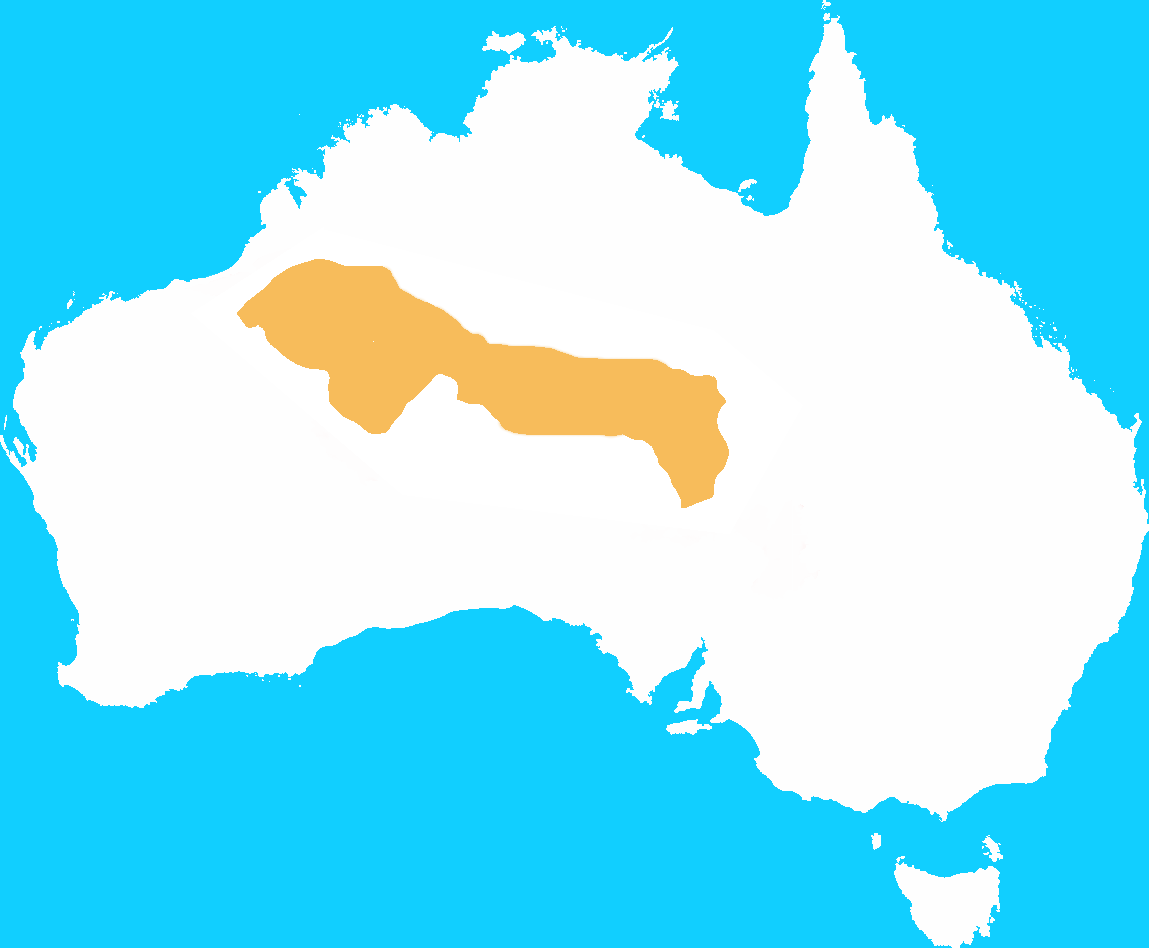
- historic range

= Lesser bilby =

Extinct species of marsupial

The lesser bilby (Macrotis leucura), also known as the yallara, the lesser rabbit-eared bandicoot or the white-tailed rabbit-eared bandicoot, is an extinct rabbit-like marsupial. The species was first described by Oldfield Thomas as Peregale leucura in 1887 from a single specimen from a collection of mammals of the British Museum. Reaching the size of a young rabbit, this species lived in the deserts of Central Australia. Since the 1950s–1960s, it has been believed to be extinct.

== Taxonomy ==
A description of the species by Oldfield Thomas was published in 1887, using a specimen forwarded to the British Museum "J. Beazley" of Adelaide, collected at an unknown location; the author determined that the source of the specimen was from the Northern Territory or the vicinity of the southern city of Adelaide. Oldfield Thomas recognized an affinity with the "rabbit-bandicoot" Macrotis lagotis, then described by the genus Peragale, but found distinctions in the specimens that described a new species.

Several later descriptions are synonymous with this species, H. H. Finlayson proposed a new subspecies as Thalacomys minor miseliusin 1932, based on specimens collected at the lower Diamantina, at Cooncherie, and acknowledged the description of Peragale minor by Baldwin Spencer in 1897, also recognised as a synonym. The treatment of the genus was again reviewed by Finlayson in 1935.

The names for the species include white-tailed bilby.

== Description ==
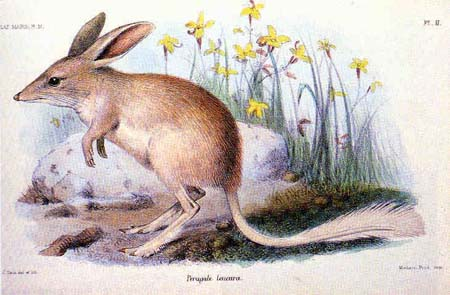
Illustration of a lesser bilby

The lesser bilby was a medium-sized marsupial with a body mass of 300–435 grams, a combined head-body length of 200–270 millimetres and tail from 120 to 170 mm. Its fur colour ranged from pale yellowish-brown to grey-brown with pale white or yellowish-white fur on its belly, with white limbs and tail. The tail of this animal was long, about 70% of its total head-body length.

Macrotis have long fur with a silky texture, the species have long tails and mobile ears that resemble those of a common rabbit (lagomorphs); they are burrowing animals that have long and narrow muzzles. The overall coloration of this species was more subdued than the bilby, Macrotis lagotis, and smaller in size; the shorter ears of M. leucura measured 63 mm from base to tip. The underside of the tail had a greyish patch at the base, but the long and bushy fur is otherwise white.

An illustration reconstructing the animal in its native setting was painted by Peter Schouten.

== Distribution and habitat ==
Very little is known about its former range and distribution, as the species was collected only six times in modern history, with the first of these coming from an unknown region.

In modern times this species was endemic to the Gibson and Great Sandy deserts of arid central Australia and northeast South Australia and adjoining southeast Northern Territory in the northern half of the Lake Eyre Basin.

It preferred to live in sandy and loamy deserts, spinifex sandplains and dunes, dominated by mounds of tough and grassy Triodia species with mulga Acacia aneura, zygochloa canegrass, or in Triodia hummock grassland with occasional low trees and shrubs.

== Ecology and behaviour ==
The lesser bilby, like its surviving relatives, was a strictly nocturnal animal. It was an omnivore feeding on ants, termites, roots, seeds, but it also hunted and fed on introduced rodents.

It burrowed in dunes, constructing burrows two to three metres (7–10 ft) deep and closing the entrance with loose sand by day. It is suggested that it may have bred non-seasonally and that giving birth to twins was normal for this species.

Unlike its living relative the greater bilby, the lesser bilby was described as aggressive and tenacious. Hedley Finlayson wrote that this animal was "fierce and intractable, and repulsed the most tactful attempts to handle them by repeated savage snapping bites and harsh hissing sounds".

A collector in the northern territory reported the name used by his Aboriginal informants, Urpila, that distinguished this species from M. lagotis (Urgata), and noted their particular habits. This species would not reside in the deep and narrow part of its burrow in cooler seasons, remaining a short distance from the entrance; this habit was exploited by hunters who would collapse the tunnel behind their prey to force it toward the soft sand covering the opening of the burrow.

== Extinction ==
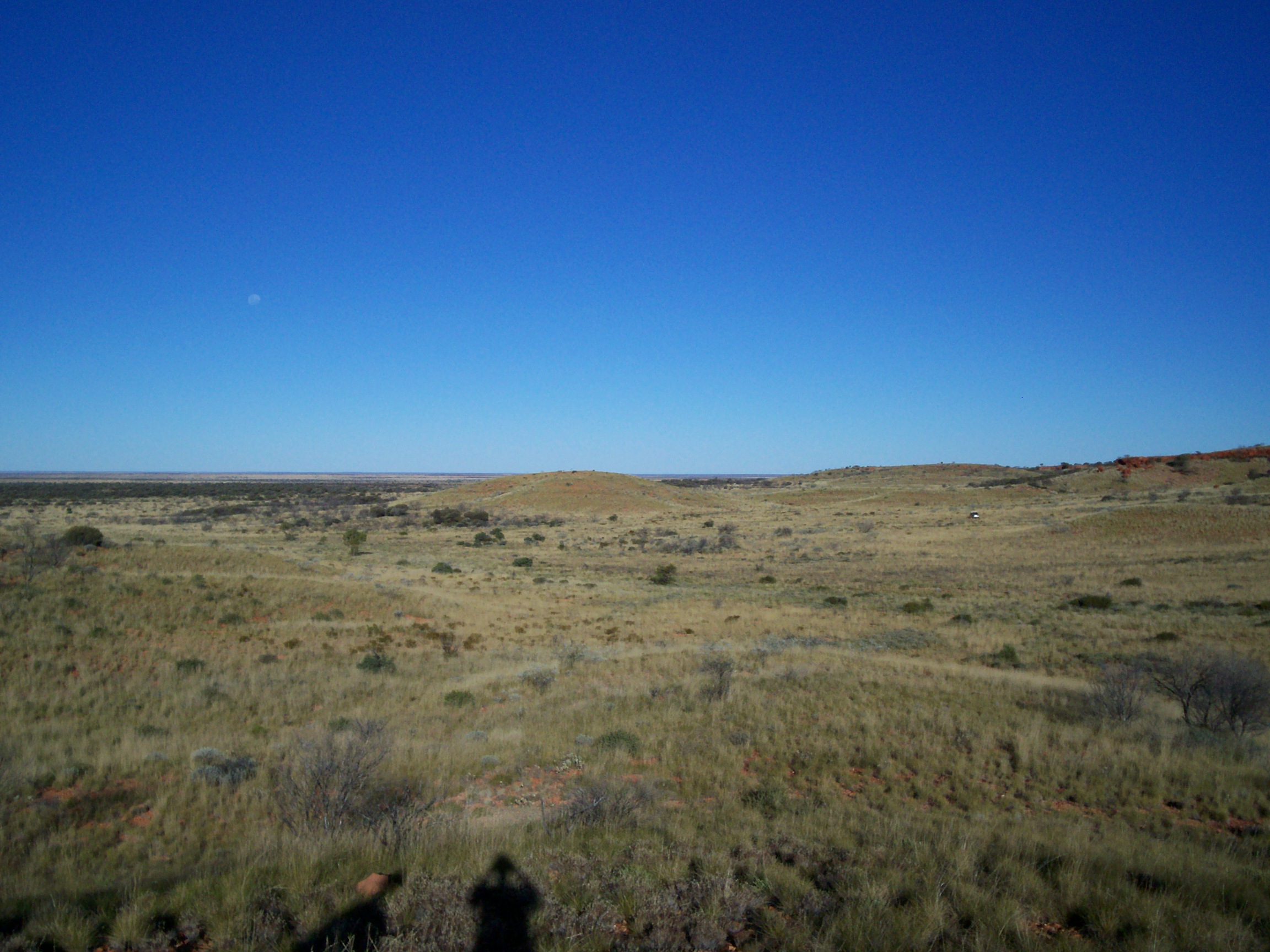
The spinifex-covered landscape of the Gibson Desert was the native habitat of the lesser bilby.

Since its discovery in 1887, the species was rarely seen or collected and remained relatively unknown to science. A single specimen collected to the north of Charlotte Waters was deposited at the museum in Melbourne and examined by Baldwin Spencer in 1897, not recognizing it as this species.

In 1931, Finlayson encountered many of them near Cooncherie Station, collecting 12 live specimens. Although according to Finlayson this animal was abundant in that area, these were the last lesser bilbies to be collected alive.

The last specimen ever found was a skull picked up below a wedge-tailed eagle's nest in 1967 at Steele Gap in the Simpson Desert, Northern Territory. The bones were estimated as being under 15 years old.

Indigenous Australian oral tradition suggests that this species possibly survived into the 1960s.

The decline in numbers of the lesser bilby and ultimately its extinction was attributed to several different factors. The introductions of foreign predators like the domestic cat and fox, competition with rabbits for food, changes in the fire regime and the degradation of habitat have all been blamed for the extinction of this species. However, Jane Thornback and Martin Jenkins suggest in The IUCN mammal red data book (1982) book that the vegetation in the main part of the animal's range remained intact, with little evidence of cattle or rabbit grazing, and point to cats and foxes as the most likely cause of the extinction of the lesser bilby.
