= Haigh's Chocolates =

Australian chocolaterie

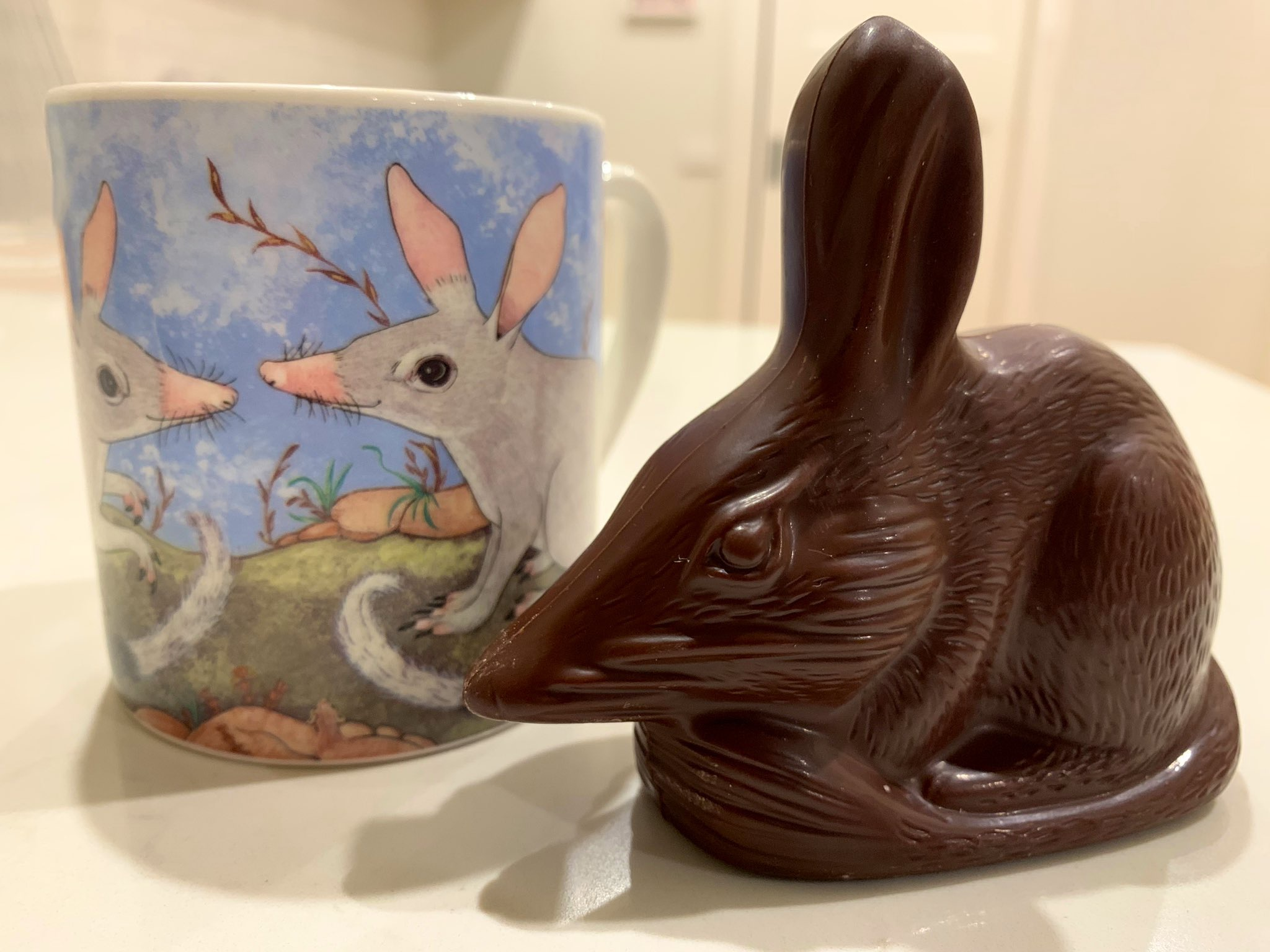
- Dark chocolate Easter Bilby
- Type: Private
- Industry: Confectionery
- Founded: 1915; 111 years ago
- Founder: Alfred E. Haigh
- Headquarters: Adelaide, Australia
- Area served: Adelaide, Melbourne, Sydney, Canberra, online (Australia)
- Key people: Claude Haigh (1933-1959); John Haigh (1959-1990); Alister Haigh (1995-2025); Peter Millard
- Products: Chocolates
- Number of employees: 900 (2025)
- Parent: AE Haigh Pty Ltd
- Website: www.haighschocolates.com

Haigh's Chocolates is an Australian family owned bean-to-bar chocolate-making company based in Adelaide, South Australia. It was founded on 1 May 1915 by Alfred E. Haigh and has retail outlets in Canberra, Melbourne, and Sydney, as well as several stores in Adelaide.

== History ==
Alfred Ernest Haigh was born in 1877 in Adelaide, South Australia. His first shop opened on 1 May 1915 at 34 King William Street and moved a few doors along to Beehive Corner in 1922 on Rundle Mall and King William Street. Upon Alfred Haigh's sudden death in 1933, his son, Claude Alfred Haigh became managing director until his retirement in 1959.

John Haigh (Alfred's grandson) wanted to expand the chocolate-making aspects of the business, and went to learn about chocolate manufacturing with Lindt & Sprüngli in Switzerland to bring new techniques back to Australia. John Haigh remained the managing director from 1959 to 1990.

In the 1950s and 1960s, Haigh's chocolates were sold in cinemas by "Tray Girls" and "Tray Boys". When cinema attendance fell, Haigh ventured to Melbourne to expand his already popular business.

Alister Haigh became CEO in 1995, remaining in the role until he stepped down on 4 August 2025. He continues as a board member, along with other fourth-generation family members Simon Haigh and Sara Fitzgerald. Peter Millard is the first CEO in the company's history appointed from outside of the family.

In December 2023, Haigh's Chocolates announced plans to open a new purpose-built factory in Salisbury South by late 2025. The factory opened on 16 September 2025, rising its production capacity from 1100 tonnes to 2000 tonnes of chocolate per year.

The décor of the original Adelaide shop remains the same as when it first opened.

== Stores ==
As of September 2025 Haigh's has 22 retail and online stores, and employs around 900 people. Since October 2014, Haigh's has sold its chocolate range online.

Haigh's Chocolates have seven stores in South Australia. Three are located in the Adelaide city centre, including the Beehive Corner store in Rundle Mall, and Adelaide Central Market. The Visitor Centre store also conducts viewing tours of the Parkside factory site that is located behind the store.

Melbourne has six Haigh's stores. Three are in the CBD, including a flagship store in the Block Arcade, while the newest store is on Elizabeth Street. There are also the suburban stores in Hawthorn, Eastland and Toorak.

There are seven Haigh's stores in Sydney in the Queen Victoria Building, The Strand Arcade, Chatswood, Westfield Bondi Junction, Westfield Miranda and Castle Towers, with the newest store opening in early September 2025 at Broadway.

There is also a store in the Canberra Centre.

== Products ==
Haigh's produces a variety of chocolate-based confectionery, including regular chocolate bars, blocks, loose chocolates and a variety of seasonal and gift products.

== Recognition and awards ==
In 2012, Haigh's was inducted into the Food South Australia Hall of Fame.

In 2022, the company received a consumer award at the South Australian Premier's Food and Beverage Industry Awards.

== Miscellaneous ==
Haigh's supports Alternative Communities Trade in Vanuatu (ACTIV), local chocolate-making company Aelan and local cocoa bean farmers from the region. The company has produced a single-origin Vanuatu chocolate bar through the cooperation.

Rabbits in Australia, initially introduced to the continent by European settlers in the 1700s, have become an unwanted pest since the late 1800s, causing widespread environmental and economic damage, and expensive control measures. Since Easter 1993, Haigh's has sold a chocolate Easter Bilby as an alternative to the Easter Bunny with part proceeds from sales being donated to the Foundation for Rabbit Free Australia.

== See also ==
- List of South Australian manufacturing businesses
- South Australian food and drink
