= Western Shield =

Nature conservation program

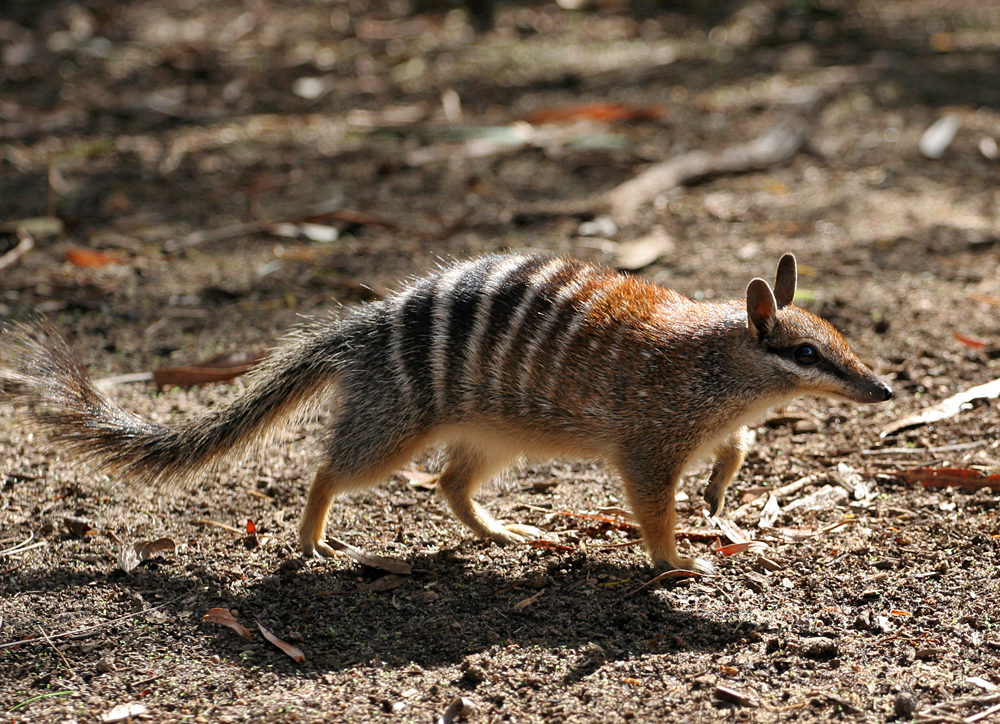
A numbat, one of the many species to benefit from Western Shield

Western Shield, managed by Western Australia's Department of Parks and Wildlife, is a nature conservation program safeguarding Western Australia's animals and protecting them from extinction. The program was set up in 1996 and as of 2009 was the largest and most successful wildlife conservation program ever undertaken in Australia.

== Conservation practices ==
Between the 1920s and 1950s scientists synthetically developed a poison called sodium fluoroacetate (commonly called 1080 poison) for use in biological warfare. Subsequently, it has been found that sodium fluoroacetate occurs naturally in many plants of the south-west coast of Western Australia and many of the native mammalian herbivore fauna in that region have evolved with a natural tolerance to the poison. The plants in the genus Gastrolobium, are commonly called "poison peas", and farmers often suffer livestock fatalities due to wandering animals that encounter and graze on the deadly plants.

During the late 1980s, a conservation program named "Fox Glove", was implemented to control the population of foxes by lacing dried meat baits and sausages with 1080 poison. Fox Glove was very effective in allowing native species' population to increase. This was due to the local eradication of introduced predators, namely foxes and feral cats, although the control of feral cats was much less effective by this means as the cats favor live prey. Poison coated oats and carrots were occasionally used to control herbivorous invasive species, including rabbits and rats.

Since 1996 when Western Shield was initiated, a Beechcraft Baron flies 55,000 km every three months to drop the 770,000 1080 poison baits. They cover an area greater than half the size of Tasmania as they deliver bait into most national parks, nature reserves and state forests of the south-west of Western Australia.

== Biological resurgence ==
The Fox Glove program primarily targeted foxes, but the baiting method proved effective for other predators as well. As a result, native species' population increased dramatically. For example, when baiting began in 1993 for medium-sized predators such as woylies in the jarrah forest of Kingston Block near Manjimup. As a result, native mammals increased sevenfold over the next five years. As the native populations increased, additional measures such as reintroduction and translocation of native species helped as well. The reintroduced animals were from breeding programs or were taken from high, self-sustaining populations elsewhere in the southwest. Western Shield has carried out many translocation activities to other P&W managed lands, privately owned conservation sanctuaries of the Australian Wildlife Conservancy, other states' conservation lands and to islands.

== Species reintroduced ==
Since 1996, over 80 translocations have taken place within Western Australia, with over 20 species (15 mammal species, three bird species, and a few reptile species) involved. The translocations have not only occurred in the south-west forests, but also the Monte Bello Islands, the Pilbara, Kalbarri, Shark Bay, islands off of Adelaide, the outback of New South Wales, and the central deserts.

Mammals

Gilbert's potoroo, chuditch, dibbler, numbat, bilby, quenda, marl, woylie, mala, tammar wallaby, western ringtail possum, Shark Bay mouse, boodie, banded hare-wallaby, common brushtail possum

Birds

Noisy scrub-bird, western bristlebird, malleefowl

Reptiles

Lancelin Island skink, western swamp tortoise

=== Species taken off the endangered species list ===
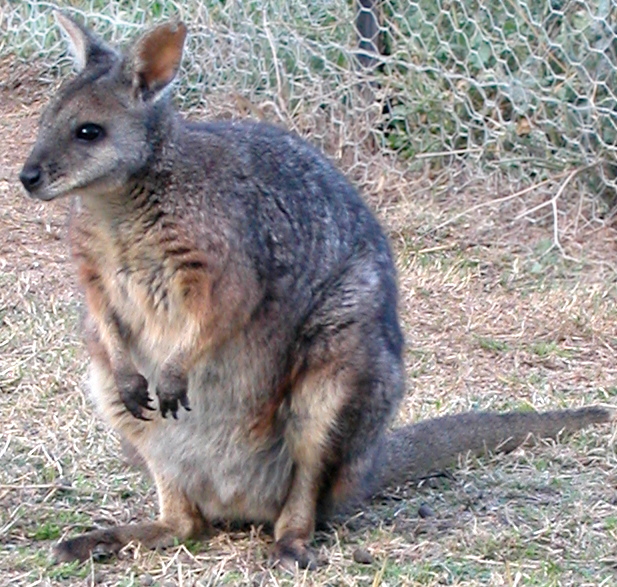
A tammar wallaby, one of the many species to benefit from Western Shield

Western Shield has been so successful that three native mammal species have been taken off the list of Western Australia's list of threatened fauna – through the Wildlife Conservation Act 1950. The species taken off "Schedule 1 – fauna that is rare or is likely to become extinct" were the quenda (Isoodon obesulus), the tammar wallaby (Macropus eugenii) and the woylie (Bettongia penicillata). The woylie was also taken off the list of Australia's threatened fauna – through the Environment Protection and Biodiversity Conservation Act 1999, it was demoted from the "endangered" category and is not even on the list any longer, as it is not deemed "in danger of extinction". The woylie was also taken off the IUCN Red List of the world's threatened fauna as "endangered" and downgraded to "lower risk / conservation dependent". Western Shield's success in having the woylie de-listed as "endangered" on the state, national, and international levels is a first for any species in the world to be taken off either the state, national, or international level of "threatened species" due to successful wildlife conservation efforts.

== Recent declines in native species ==
The success story of the Western Shield program has been tarnished by more recent developments. The woylie has been added back to WA's list of threatened fauna due to the sharp declines since 2002, with some places having as much as a 95% decrease (including that locality near the Upper Warren in Manjimup, where the original sevenfold increase occurred). The woylies' population across all of Australia has declined, especially the P&W managed lands of the south-west forests. Wild populations that were replenished through translocations in South Australia have also mysteriously declined. In fact, quite a few other species of the southwest forests have also declined and with no definite answers, despite many studies being undertaken, including through Parks and Wildlife’s new initiative, "Saving our Species". Possible explanations include: disease, global warming, ground water losses, introduced predators building up a resistance to the poison in the baits, a natural population fluctuation, or an increase in predation by native enemies such as carpet pythons and chuditches, which are surviving well. A search for the cause is under way.

== Gilbert's potoroos' significant recovery ==
Western Shield has saved many species from extinction. One is the Gilbert's potoroo, which was "lost" for over 100 years and rediscovered in 1994 in Two Peoples Bay Nature Reserve, near Albany. At the time of rediscovery the population consisted of probably less than 30 individuals. Western Shield's Gilbert's potoroo subdivision, led by Dr. Tony Friend, now has a self-sustaining mainland wild population, a breeding center "back up" stock with a cross fostering program for long-nosed potoroos, and an island home for breeding animals on Bald Island. Although still below 40 animals, the critically endangered Gilbert's potoroo is in safe hands and seems to be on the road to recovery.

== Effectiveness ==
Although the early success of Western Shield has dimmed due to the decrease in some populations of native species in the latter 2000s, the program is still at the forefront in the conservation of Australian native species. This program continues to conduct population studies while developing new tools for biodiversity protection and restoration. Future frontiers for Western Shield include: efforts in the desert regions, the creation of an effective feral cat bait, and biological invasive species control. All of these measures are aimed at reducing the number of endangered species and returning WA to the bio-diverse haven it was prior to European settlement.

== See also ==
- Conservation in Australia
- Gastrolobium
