= Benjamin Arthur Bensley =

Canadian mammologist

Benjamin Arthur Bensley (1875–1934) was a Canadian mammologist.

He was born in Hamilton, Ontario to Robert Daniel and Caroline Vandeleur Bensley. He was best known for his work on marsupials and a standard text Practical Anatomy of the Rabbit. Bensley headed the department of biology at the University of Toronto after graduating from the same institution and completing his doctorate at Columbia University.

He spent about two years in London, from 1901, studying marsupials at the British Museum. In 1903 he returned to the University of Toronto as a lecturer and in 1914 was made head of the Biology Department.

He was the first director of the Royal Ontario Museum of Zoology, appointed on its founding in October 1913.

He died on January 20, 1934, at his home in Toronto. He was survived by his wife, Ruth Horton, and his son, Dr. Edward Bensley.
