= Easter Bunny =

Folkloric figure and symbol

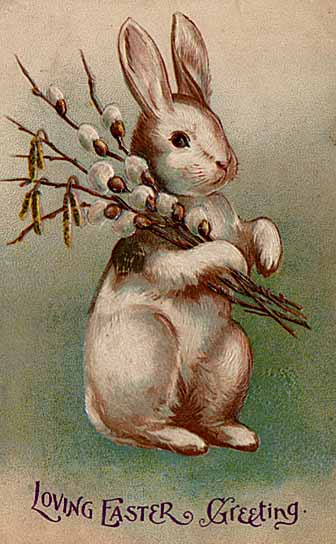
- A 1907 postcard featuring the Easter Bunny

Creature information
- Other name(s): Easter Rabbit, Easter Hare
- Grouping: Legendary creature
- Sub grouping: Animal
- Folklore: Folkloric figure and symbol of Easter

Origin
- Country: Germany

The Easter Bunny (also called the Easter Rabbit or Easter Hare) is a folkloric figure and symbol of Easter, depicted as a rabbit—sometimes dressed with clothes—bringing Easter eggs to people. Originating among German Lutherans, the "Easter Hare" originally played the role of a judge, evaluating whether children were good or disobedient in behavior at the start of the season of Eastertide, similar to the "naughty or nice" list made by Santa Claus. As part of the legend, the creature carries colored eggs in its basket, as well as candy, and sometimes toys, to the homes of children. As such, the Easter Bunny again shows similarities to Santa (or the Christkind) and Christmas by bringing gifts to children on the night before a holiday. The custom was mentioned in a German text from 1572, which translated reads: “Do not worry if the Easter Bunny escapes you; should we miss his eggs, we will cook the nest” and in Georg Franck von Franckenau's De ovis paschalibus ("About Easter Eggs") in 1682, referring to a German folk belief of an Easter Hare laying eggs hidden in garden and bushes for children to find in egg hunt.

== Symbols ==
=== Rabbits and hares ===
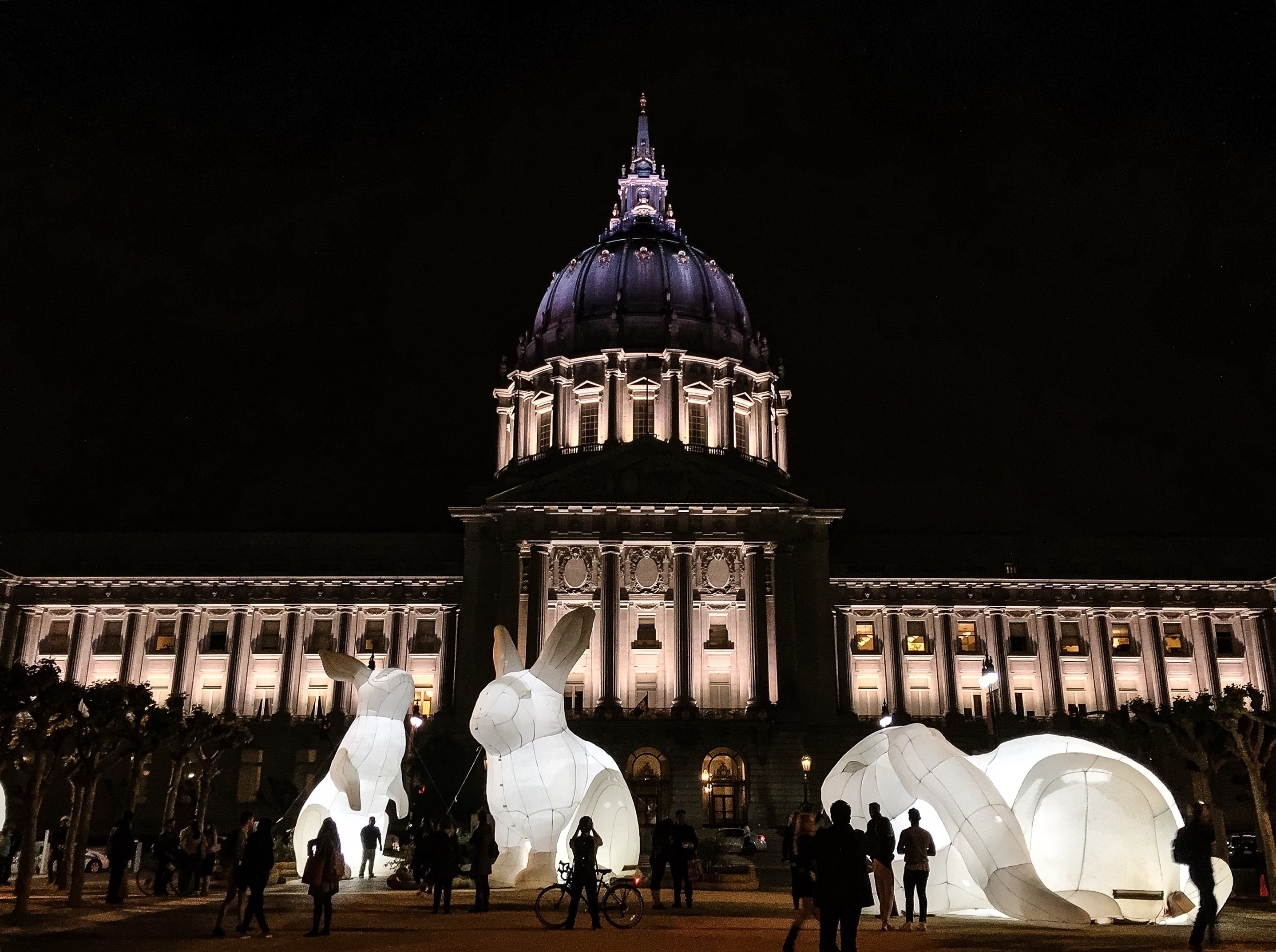
Inflatable Easter Bunnies in front of San Francisco City Hall

The hare was a popular motif in medieval church art. In ancient times, it was widely believed (as by Pliny, Plutarch, Philostratus, and Aelian) that the hare was a hermaphrodite. The idea that a hare could reproduce without loss of virginity led to an association with the Virgin Mary, with hares sometimes occurring in illuminated manuscripts and Northern European paintings of the Virgin and Christ Child. It may also have been associated with the Holy Trinity, as in the three hares motif.

=== Eggs ===
In Christianity, for the celebration of Eastertide, Easter eggs symbolize the tomb of Jesus, from which Jesus was resurrected. Eggs became associated with Easter specifically when eating them was prohibited during the fast of Lent, when believers abstained from meat and animal products—a practice that continues in certain Christian denominations today, such as the Coptic Orthodox Church, and among Western Christians observing the Daniel Fast. A common practice in England during the medieval Christian era was for children to go door-to-door begging for eggs on the Saturday before Lent began. People handed out eggs as special treats for children to enjoy prior to the Lenten fast; people then abstained from eggs throughout Lent and could enjoy them once again with the conclusion of Lent at the arrival of Easter Sunday. As a special dish, eggs have been decorated by Christians as part of the Easter celebrations. Eggs boiled with some flowers change their color, bringing the spring into the homes, and some over time added the custom of decorating the eggs. Many Christians of the Eastern Orthodox Church and Oriental Orthodox Church to this day typically dye their Easter eggs red "in memory of the blood of Christ, shed as at that time of his crucifixion." The Ukrainian art of decorating eggs is known as pysanky. Similar variants of this form of artwork are seen among other eastern and central European cultures.

The idea of an egg-giving hare went to the U.S. in the 18th century. Protestant German immigrants in the Pennsylvania Dutch area told their children about the "Osterhase" (sometimes spelled "Oschter Haws"). Hase means "hare", not rabbit, and in Northwest European folklore the "Easter Bunny" indeed is a hare. According to the legend, only good children received gifts of colored eggs in the nests that they made in their caps and bonnets before Easter.

== Gallery ==
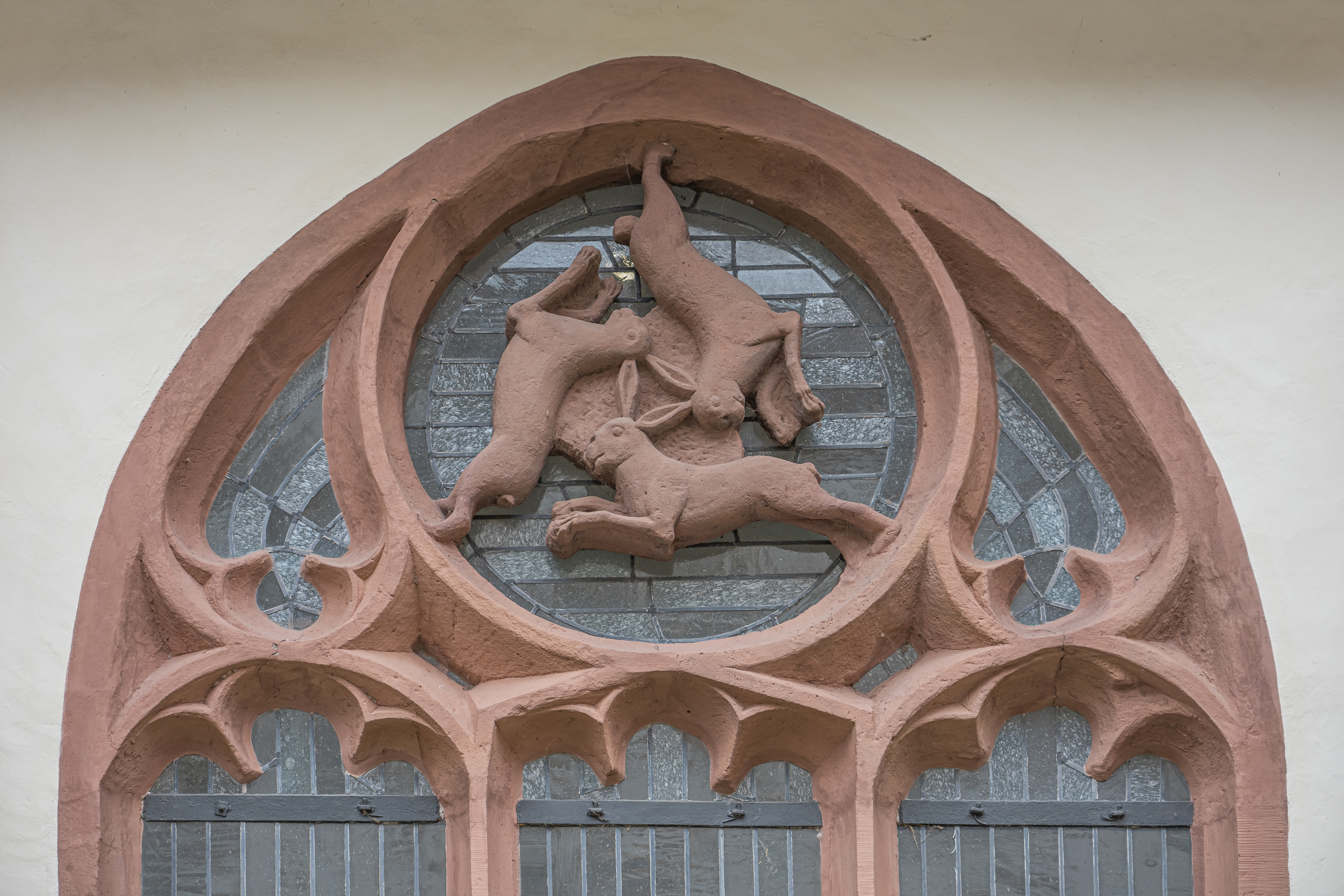
Dreihasenfenster ('Window of Three Hares') in Paderborn Cathedral in Paderborn, Germany

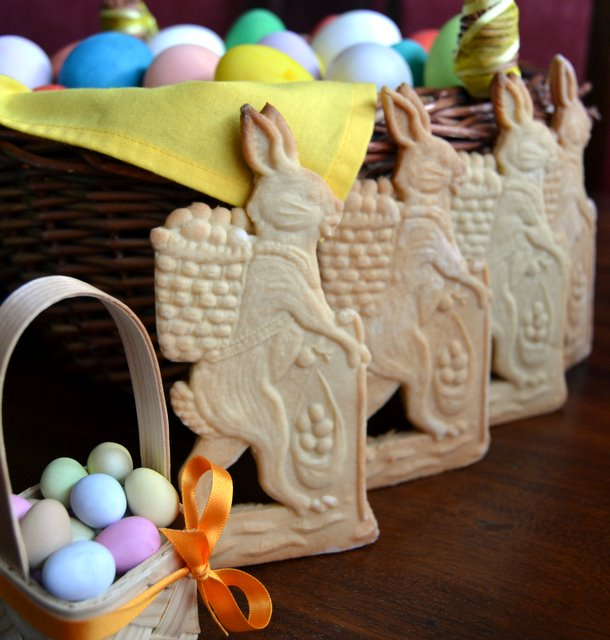
Easter bunnies and Easter eggs as Easter biscuits

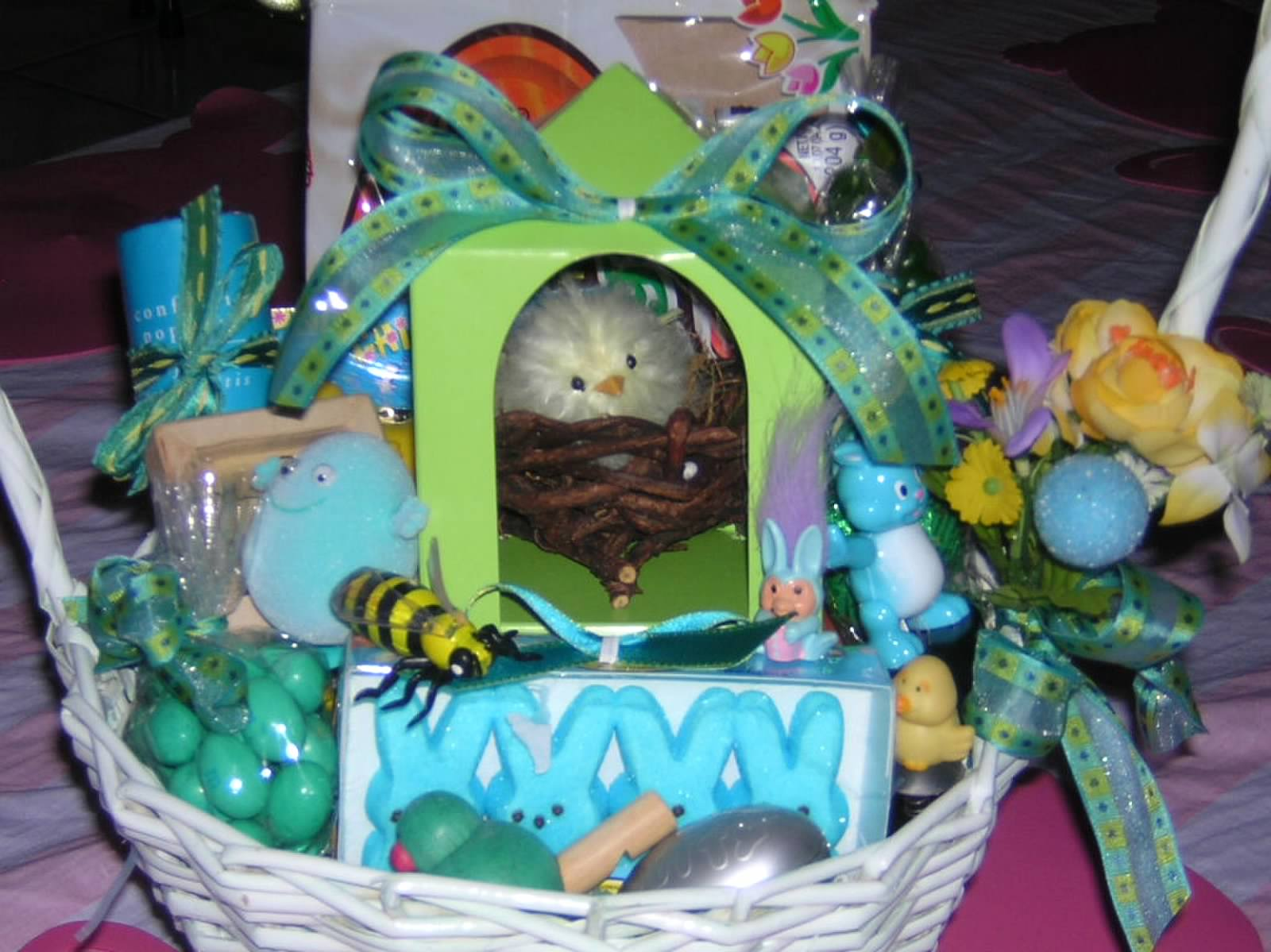
Marshmallow bunnies and candy eggs in an Easter basket

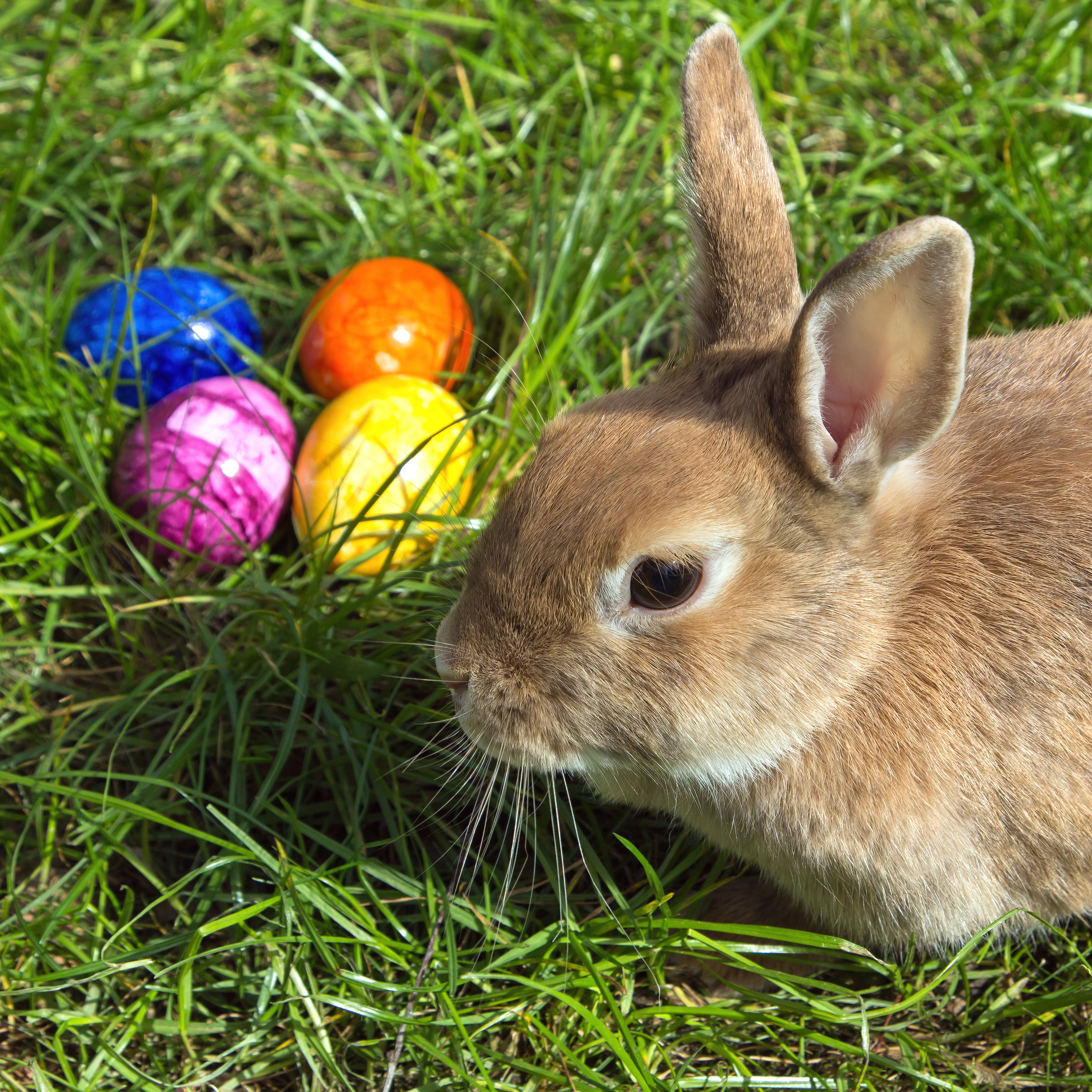
A real live bunny with decorated Easter eggs

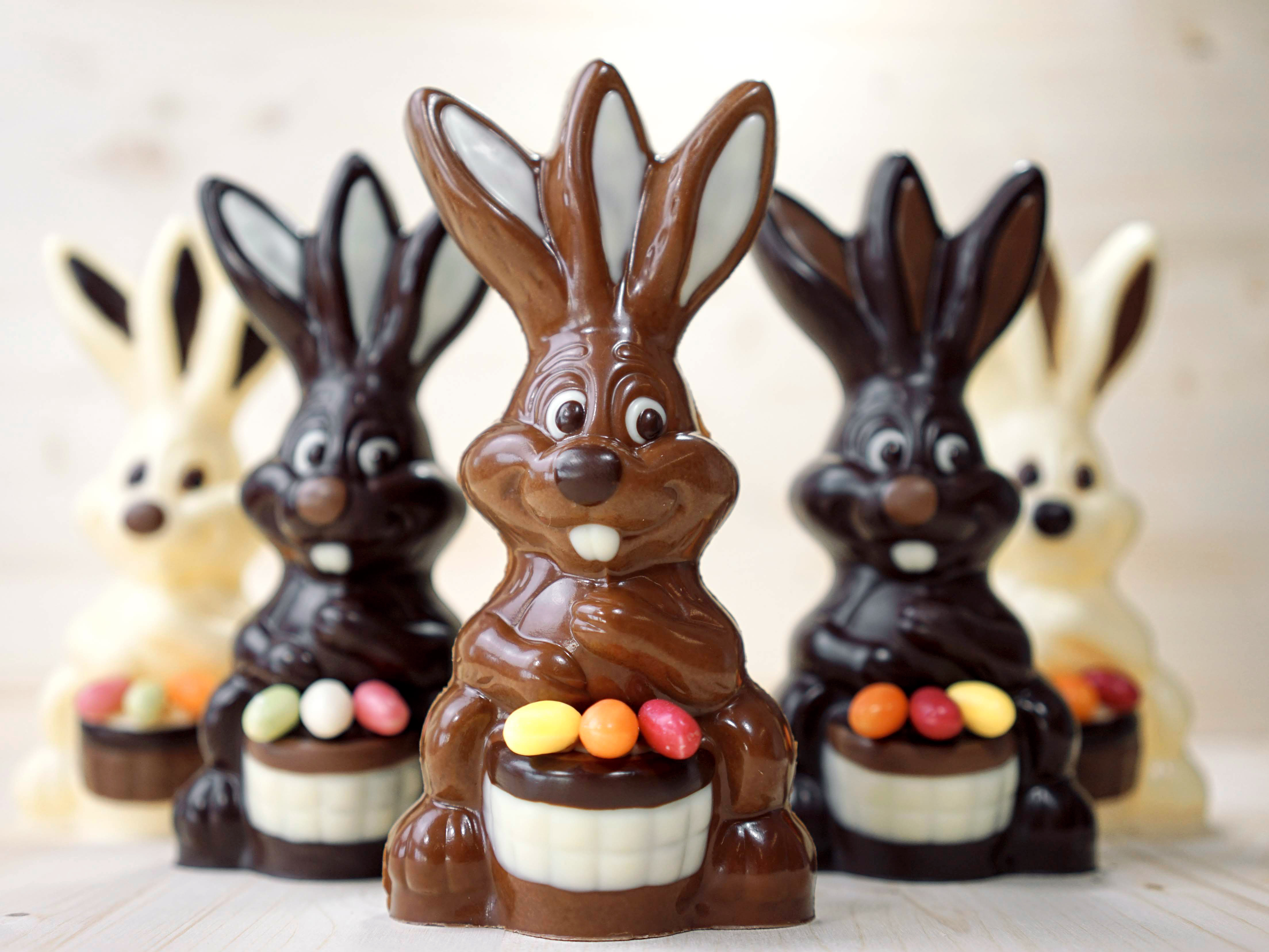
Chocolate Easter bunnies

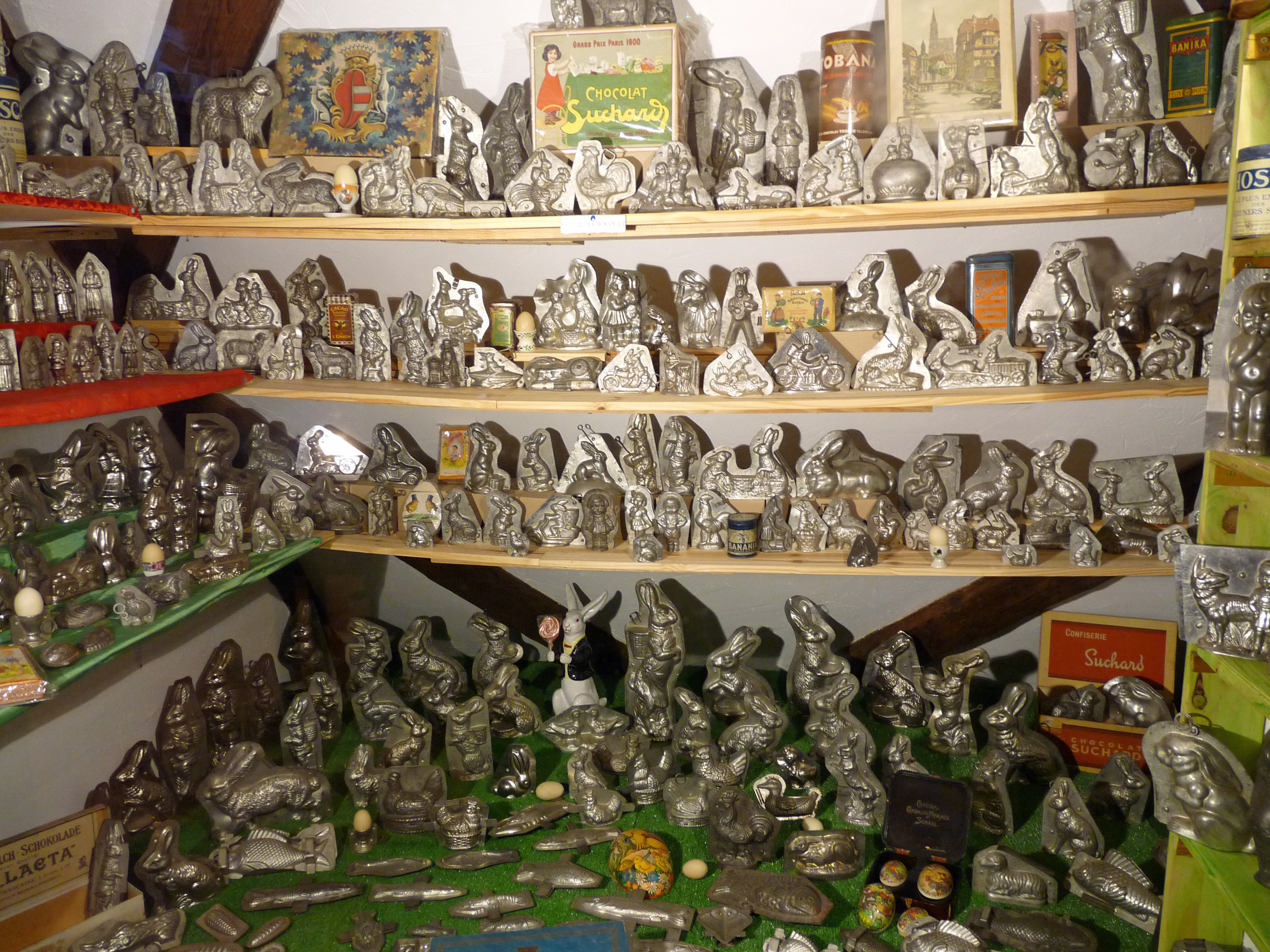
Chocolate Easter Bunny molds from Alsace Musée du pain d'épices

== History ==
=== Historical evidence ===
The earliest attested reference to the Easter Hare (Osterhase) appears in 1678, recorded in De ovis paschalibus ('About Easter Eggs') by the physician Georg Franck von Franckenau in south-west Germany. The tradition, however, remained largely unknown in other German regions until the 18th century. According to scholar Richard Sermon, hares were a common sight in gardens during the spring and may have provided a convenient explanation for the coloured eggs that were hidden there for children. Alternatively, he notes, a long-standing European belief held that hares laid eggs, likely arising from the similarity between a hare’s form or resting place and the nest of a lapwing, both of which are found in grassland and appear in spring. During the 19th century, the growing influence of Easter-themed cards, toys, and books helped popularize the Easter Hare or Rabbit across Europe. German immigrants subsequently carried the custom to Britain and America, where it developed into the Easter Bunny.

=== Alleged association with Ēostre ===
In a publication from 1874 German philologist Adolf Holtzmann stated "The Easter Hare is unintelligible to me, but probably the hare was the sacred animal of Ostara". The connection between Easter and that goddess had been made by Jacob Grimm in his 1835 Deutsche Mythologie. This proposed association was repeated by other authors including Charles Isaac Elton and Charles J. Billson. In 1961 Christina Hole wrote, "The [hare] is the true Easter beast, for he was once sacred to the European Spring-Goddess whom we have already met under her Anglo-Saxon name of Ēostre." The belief that Ēostre had a hare companion who became the Easter Bunny was popularized when it was presented as fact in the BBC documentary Shadow of the Hare (1993).

The Oxford Dictionary of English Folklore however states "nowadays, many writers claim that hares were sacred to the Anglo-Saxon goddess Ēostre, but there is no shred of evidence for this; Bede, the only writer to mention Ēostre, does not link her with any animal".

A legend often encountered in contemporary times is that Eostre freed a frozen bird from a tree branch by turning it into a hare. It still continued to lay eggs but, having no use for them anymore and in gratitude to the goddess, gave them away. This has no basis in any authentic, pre-Christian folklore, myth or religion and only appears to date from 1883, first published by K. A. Oberle in a book in German and later quoted by H. Krebs in a notes section in the journal Folk-Lore, also in 1883. His quote is as follows:

Some time ago the question was raised how it came that, according to South German still prevailing folk-lore, the Hare is believed by children to lay the Easter-eggs. I venture now to offer a probable answer to it. Originally the hare seems to have been a bird which the ancient Teutonic goddess Ostara (the Anglo-Saxon Eàstre or Eostre, as Bede calls her) transformed into a quadruped. For this reason the Hare, in grateful recollection of its former quality as bird and swift messenger of the Spring-Goddess, is able to lay eggs on her festival at Easter-time.

== See also ==
- Domestic and pet rabbits
- Easter Bilby – Australian holiday character
- Mad as a March hare
- Rabbits and hares in art
