= We Pierce =

Book by Andrew Huebner

- Author: Andrew Huebner
- Genre: War
- Publisher: Simon & Schuster
- Publication date: 2003
- Publication place: United States
- Pages: 278
- ISBN: 0-74-321277-0
- OCLC: 51511259
- Preceded by: American by Blood

We Pierce is a 2003 novel by Andrew Huebner. It tells the story of two brothers, Smith and Sam. Smith leads a tank company into battle in Iraq during the Gulf War, while Sam protests the war and struggles with alcohol and narcotic abuse.
