= Kung Fu Panda: The Dragon Knight =

Computer-animated streaming television series

- Season 1 promotional poster featuring Po and Sir Luthera / Wandering Blade
- Genre: Action-adventure; Comedy
- Based on: Kung Fu Panda
- Developed by: Mitch Watson; Peter Hastings
- Voices of: Jack Black; Rita Ora; Chris Geere; Della Saba; James Hong; Rahnuma Panthaky; Ed Weeks; Melissa Villaseñor; Shohreh Aghdashloo; Omid Abtahi
- Theme music composer: Peter Hastings
- Composers: Kevin Lax; Robert Lydecker
- Country of origin: United States
- Original language: English
- No. of seasons: 3
- No. of episodes: 42

Production
- Executive producers: Peter Hastings; Shaunt Nigoghossian; Jack Black
- Running time: 24-46 minutes
- Production company: DreamWorks Animation Television

Original release
- Network: Netflix
- Release: July 14, 2022 – September 7, 2023

Related
- Kung Fu Panda: Legends of Awesomeness (2011–2016); Kung Fu Panda: The Paws of Destiny (2018–2019)

Kung Fu Panda: The Dragon Knight is an American animated television series, developed by Mitch Watson and Peter Hastings for Netflix. It is the third TV series in the Kung Fu Panda franchise, following Legends of Awesomeness and The Paws of Destiny, and serves as a bridge between the third and fourth films. It is the first in which Jack Black reprises his role as the voice of Po, replacing his replacement Mick Wingert Produced by DreamWorks Animation Television, the series premiered on Netflix on July 14, 2022. A second season was released on January 12, 2023. A third and final season was released on September 7, 2023.

== Premise ==
The series picks up a few years after General Kai's defeat and Shi Long's defeat where the Dragon Warrior Po the giant panda must leave his home and embark on a far-reaching quest across China for redemption and justice that finds him partnered up with a no-nonsense English knight named Luthera (a brown bear), also known as Wandering Blade, to find four elemental weapons that broke up the world a long time ago.

== Voice cast ==
=== Main ===
- Jack Black as Po / Op
- Rita Ora as Sir Luthera / Wandering Blade
  - Kai Zen as young Sir Luthera
- Chris Geere as Klaus Dumont
- Della Saba as Veruca Dumont / Rabia's Mother
- James Hong as Mr. Ping
- Rahnuma Panthaky as Rukhmini / Zip / Additional Voice
- Ed Weeks as Colin / Mashmeater / Basil / Rock Monster / Additional Voice
- Melissa Villaseñor as Akna
- Shohreh Aghdashloo as Forouzan

=== Recurring ===
- Omid Abtahi as Sir Alfred
- Parry Shen as Weimin / Additional Voice
- Todd Haberkorn as The Emperor of China / Additional Voice
- Barbara Goodson as The Queen of England
- Mick Wingert as Sir Drake / Rabia's Father / Additional Voice
- Kinza Khan as Rabia
- Martin Aistrope as Master Mastodon
- Sean T. Krishnan as Jayesh / Additional Voice
- Anjali Bhimani as Padma
- Deepti Gupta as Diya
- Richard Ayoade as Kyle
- Harvey Guillén as Pelpel
- Jorge Diaz as B'ah / Pax / Additional Voice
- Sarah-Nicole Robles as Queen Zuma
- Toks Olagundoye as Lucinda / Rosalie

=== Guest ===
- Amy Hill as Pei Pei
- Tru Valentino as Chuntao / Edward / Additional Voice
- Stephanie Sheh as Elder Huang
- James Sie as Lao / Nian / Additional Voice
- Dayci Brookshire as Changpu
- Rolonda Watts as High Priestess
- Nolan North as Shoddy Boat Owner
- JB Blanc as Nigel
- Peter Hastings as Additional Voice
- Carlos Alazraqui as Amoch / Additional Voice
- Billy Boyd as Edgar
- Nicholas Guy Smith as Duncan
- Keith Ferguson as Benny / Augustus / Additional Voice
- Sean Astin as Master Sloth
- Kineta Kunutu as Master Longtooth / Kemanzi
- Kenna Ramsey as Master Ostrich
- Regi Davis as Barya

== Episodes ==
=== Series overview ===
Series overview
Season	Episodes	Originally released
1	11	July 14, 2022
2	12	January 12, 2023
3	19	September 7, 2023

=== Season 1 (2022) ===
No. overall	No. in season	Title	Directed by	Written by	Storyboard by	Original release date
1	1	"A Cause for the Paws"	Shaunt Nigoghossian	Peter Hastings	Kelly Baigent, Martvin Britt, Matthew Humphreys, Kevin Wotton, Victoria Harris, Grace Liu, James Yang, Ed Raza, Calvin Tsang & Will Ruzicka	July 14, 2022
2	2	"The Knight's Code"	Matthew Humphreys	Christopher Amick & Ben Mekler	Victoria Harris, Grace Liu & Ed Raza	July 14, 2022
3	3	"The Lotus"	Kevin Wotton & James Yang	Jasmine Chiong	Kelly Baigent, Peter Yong & Ian Young	July 14, 2022
4	4	"The Legend of Master Longtooth"	David Dick & James Yang	Shane Lynch	Solomon Fong, Joey Largo, Ande Rose, Cody Shaw, Thalia Tomlinson & Mike West	July 14, 2022
5	5	"The Gateway to the Desert"	Mike Goguen & Matthew Humphreys	Christopher Amick & Ben Mekler	Victoria Harris, Grace Liu & Ed Raza	July 14, 2022
6	6	"The Lost City"	Kevin Wotton & James Yang	Joy Regullano	Rachel Mackey, Marc Wasik, Peter Yong & Ian Young	July 14, 2022
7	7	"The Last Guardian"	David Dick & Calvin Tsang	Jasmine Chiong	Solomon Fong, Matthew Humphreys, Ande Rose, Thalia Tomlinson & Calvin Tsang	July 14, 2022
8	8	"A Thread in the Dark"	Matthew Humphreys & Mike Goguen	Shane Lynch	Victoria Harris, Grace Liu & Ed Raza	July 14, 2022
9	9	"Slow Boat to England"	Kevin Wotton, James Yang & Michael Mullen	Joy Regulland	Rachel Mackey, Peter Yong, Ian Young & Marc Wasik	July 14, 2022
10	10	"The Knight's Fall (Part 1)"	David Dick & Jack Kasprzak	Christopher Amick & Ben Mekler	Solomon Fong, Ande Rose & Thalia Tomlinson	July 14, 2022
11	11	"The Knight's Fall (Part 2)"	Kelly Baigent, Kevin Wotton & Will Ruzicka	Christopher Amick & Ben Mekler	Rachel Mackey, Peter Yong, Ian Young, and Mark Sonntag	July 14, 2022

=== Season 2 (2023) ===
No. overall	No. in season	Title	Directed by	Written by	Storyboard by	Original release date
12	1	"The Liar and the Thief"	David Dick & James Yang	Christopher Amick & Ben Mekler	Solomon Fong, Ande Rose & Thalia Tomlinson	January 12, 2023
13	2	"One Last Job"	Mike Goguen & Matthew Humphreys	Jasmine Chiong	Akiel Guzman, Grace Liu, Ifesinachi Orijekwe & Ed Raza	January 12, 2023
14	3	"Doom and Groom"	Kelly Baigent, Kevin Wotton & Will Ruzicka	Christopher Amick	Rachel Mackey, Mark Sonntag & Peter Yong	January 12, 2023
15	4	"The Pinging"	David Dick, Shaunt Nigoghossian & James Yang	Joy Regullano	Solomon Fong, Louie Escauriaga and Ande Rose	January 12, 2023
16	5	"Master Mastodon"	Mike Goguen	Ellie Guzman	Akiel Guzman, Grace Liu, Ifesinaki Orijekwe & Ed Raza	January 12, 2023
17	6	"Hide the Lightening"	Kelly Baigent & Will Ruzicka	Christopher Amick & Ben Mekler	Rachel Mackey, Mark Sonntag & Peter Yong	January 12, 2023
18	7	"The Beast"	David Dick & Christo Stamboliev	Jasmine Chiong	Louie Escauriaga, Solomon Fong, James Q. Nquyen, Megan Parker & Antonio Soares Neto	January 12, 2023
19	8	"An Uphill Battle"	Mike Goguen	Shane Lynch	Grace Liu, Isefinaki Orijekwe, Ed Raza & Joshua Taback	January 12, 2023
20	9	"The Mad Scientist"	Will Ruzicka	Joy Regullano	Jiani Cao, James Q. Nguyen & Hideki Yumitani	January 12, 2023
21	10	"Apok-ta-pocalypse Now (Part 1)"	David Dick & Christo Stamboliev	Christopher Amick & Ben Mekler	Solomon Fong, Megan Parker & Antonio Soares Neto	January 12, 2023
22	11	"Apok-ta-pocalypse Now (Part 2)"	Mike Goguen	Christopher Amick & Ben Mekler	Akiel Guzman, Grace Liu & Ed Raza	January 12, 2023
23	12	"Epic Lunar New Year"	Mike Goguen & Will Ruzicka	Felicia Ho	Jiani Cao, Akiel Guzman, Grace Liu, James Q. Nguyen, Ed Raza & Hideki Yumitani	January 12, 2023
Note: "Epic Lunar New Year" is the only double-length episode of the series, running at 46 minutes.

=== Season 3 (2023) ===
No. overall	No. in season	Title	Directed by	Written by	Storyboard by	Original release date
24	1	"The Trial of Mr. Ping"	Will Ruzicka	Jasmine Chiong	Jiani Cao, James Q. Nguyen & Hideki Yumitani	September 7, 2023
25	2	"Baddie Issues"	David Dick, Dan Forgione & Christo Stamboliev	Shane Lynch	Solomon Fong, Megan Parker & Antonio Soares Neto	September 7, 2023
26	3	"A Family Friend"	David Dick & Dan Forgione	Ellie Guzman	Solomon Fong, Antonio Soares Neto & Megan Parker	September 7, 2023
27	4	"The English Opening"	Mike Goguen	Christopher Amick & Ben Mekler	Akiel Guzman, Grace Liu, Ed Raza & Dan Stone	September 7, 2023
28	5	"The Bog-ey Man of Festermouth"	Will Ruzicka	Jasmine Chiong	Jiani Cao, James Q. Nguyen & Hideki Yumitani	September 7, 2023
29	6	"Tea Time Trouble"	David Dick & Dan Forgione	Shane Lynch	Solomon Fong, Antonio Soares Neto & Megan Parker	September 7, 2023
30	7	"Benny and the Jests"	Mike Goguen	Ellie Guzman	Akiel Guzman, Ed Raza & Dan Stone	September 7, 2023
31	8	"Black Steel of the Equinox"	Will Ruzicka	Christopher Amick & Ben Mekler	Jiani Cao, Shiyeon Cho, James Q. Nguyen & Hideki Yumitani	September 7, 2023
32	9	"Luthera’s Shield"	David Dick & Dan Forgione	Jasmine Chiong	Solomon Fong, Megan Parker & Antonio Soares Neto	September 7, 2023
33	10	"The Battle of Tianshang (Part 1)"	Mike Goguen	Ellie Guzman	Akiel Guzman, Ed Raza & Dan Stone	September 7, 2023
34	11	"The Battle of Tianshang (Part 2)"	Will Ruzicka	Shane Lynch	Shiyeon Cho, James Q. Nguyen & Hideki Yumitani	September 7, 2023
35	12	"The Pangea-ing"	David Dick & Dan Forgione	Christopher Amick & Ben Mekler	Solomon Fong, Megan Parker & Antonio Soares Neto	September 7, 2023
36	13	"The Poison Ravine"	Mike Goguen	Ellie Guzman	Akiel Guzman, Ed Raza & Dan Stone	September 7, 2023
37	14	"The Master Key"	Will Ruzicka	Neyah Barbee	Shiyeon Cho, James Q. Nguyen & Hideki Yumitani	September 7, 2023
38	15	"The Last Dumont"	David Dick & Dan Forgione	Jasmine Chiong	Marta Demong, Solomon Fong, Calvin Leung, Megan Parker & Antonio Soares Neto	September 7, 2023
39	16	"A Teacup Filled with the Self"	Mike Goguen	Shane Lynch	Akiel Guzman, Ed Raza & Dan Stone	September 7, 2023
40	17	"The Beginning of the End"	Will Ruzicka	Ellie Guzman	Shiyeon Cho, James Q. Nguyen & Hideki Yumitani	September 7, 2023
41	18	"The Dragon Knights (Part 1)"	David Dick & Dan Forgione	Christopher Amick & Ben Mekler	Marta Demong, Calvin Leung, Antonio Soares Neto & Megan Parker	September 7, 2023
42	19	"The Dragon Knights (Part 2)"	Mike Goguen	Christopher Amick & Ben Mekler	Akiel Guzman, Sam Montes, Ed Raza & Dan Stone	September 7, 2023

== Production ==
=== Development ===
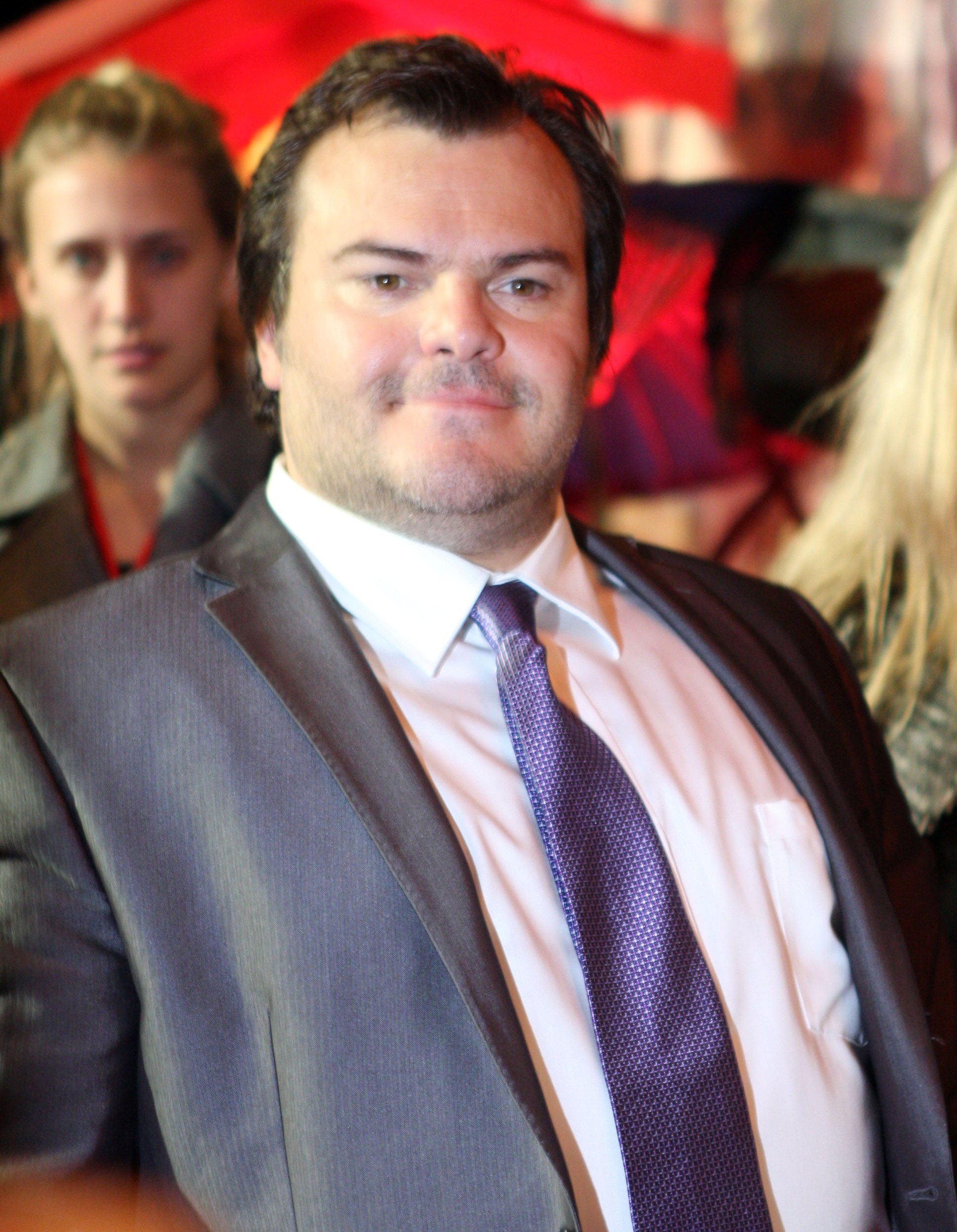
Jack Black (pictured in 2011), served as executive producer for the series and reprised his role as Po rather than Mick Wingert, who voiced the character in Legends of Awesomeness and Paws of Destiny.

During National Panda Day in March 2022, DreamWorks and Netflix announced a new CGI animated Kung Fu Panda series with Jack Black reprising his role as Po from the films and serving as executive producer with Peter Hastings (Pinky and the Brain, The Epic Tales of Captain Underpants) and Shaunt Nigoghossian (Be Cool, Scooby-Doo!), while story edited and co-executive produced by Kipo writers Chris Amick and Ben Mekler.

The concept idea for the series began as a road buddy comedy that takes the viewers all over in pursuit of their goal to try to catch the bad guys. Jack Black had a cool vision for what an epic journey would be, one that fits well from the first Kung Fu Panda film while having a darker, more mature tone with the show versus past chapters also marks how the series is expanding the franchise. Season 2 expands the concept further to explore Indian culture and Central American culture and deepens the characters made from the first season.

Assets from Paws of Destiny were used to build the sets but some episodes have 2D animation styles based on their own setting. One is rendered as comic graphic art, since an unpublished comic book is the central icon of that particular chapter of the story, and another one has a British-looking, lithograph kind of look.

A score soundtrack from Kevin Lax (The First Purge, Burning Sands) and Robert Lydecker (Iron Fist, Lethal Weapon, Sleepy Hollow, Designated Survivor) was released on July 15 by Back Lot Music.

Animation production services are provided by Technicolor (now known as Mikros Animation), 88 Pictures (Season 2), and Stella Creative Labs while storyboard services are provided by Dave Enterprises and Kok & Co., Pty, Ltd.

=== Release ===
The first season of Kung Fu Panda: The Dragon Knight was released on July 14, 2022, on Netflix. A second season, announced in December 2022, was released on January 12, 2023. A third and final season, announced in August 2023, was released on September 7, 2023.

== Awards and nominations ==
Year	Award	Category	Nominee(s)	Result	Ref.
2022	KidScreen Awards	Best New Series in Kids Programming	Kung Fu Panda: The Dragon Knight	Won	
2023	Annie Awards	Outstanding Achievement for Storyboarding in an Animated Television / Broadcast Production	Grace Liu (for "The Knight's Code")	Nominated	
2023	Children's and Family Emmy Awards	Outstanding Voice Performance in a Children's or Young Teen Program	Jack Black	Won	
2023	Children's and Family Emmy Awards	Outstanding Directing for an Animated Program	David Dick, Mike Goguen, Will Ruzicka, Kevin Wotton and James Yang	Nominated	
2023	Children's and Family Emmy Awards	Outstanding Music Direction and Composition for an Animated Program	Kevin Lax, Robert Lydecker, Vivian Aguiar-Buff, Alexandra Nickson and Clare Yezerski	Won	
2023	Children's and Family Emmy Awards	Outstanding Sound Editing and Sound Mixing for an Animated Program	Rob McIntyre, DJ Lynch, Anna Adams, Evan Dockter, Marc Schmidt, Monique Reymond, Cat Gensler and Roberto Alegria	Nominated	
2024	KidScreen Awards	Best Animated Series	Kung Fu Panda: The Dragon Knight	Nominated	
2024	KidScreen Awards	Best Holiday or Special Episode	"Epic Lunar New Year"	Won	
2024	Annie Awards	Outstanding Achievement for Storyboarding in an Animated Television / Broadcast Production	Grace Liu (for "Apok-ta-pokalypse Now, Part II")	Nominated	
