= American by Blood =

First edition (publ. Simon & Schuster)

American by Blood is a 2001 historical fiction novel by Andrew Huebner. It is his first novel and tells the story of three American Civil War scouts.
