= Kung Fu Panda: Legends of Awesomeness season 1 =

Kung Fu Panda: Legends of Awesomeness
- Season 1
- No. of episodes: 26

Release
- Original network: Nickelodeon
- Original release: November 7, 2011 – April 5, 2012

Season chronology
- Next → Season 2

Kung Fu Panda: Legends of Awesomeness's first season airing between September 19, 2011 and 2012. The first episode "Scorpion's Sting" aired on September 19, 2011 as a sneak preview followed by another episode "The Princess and the Po" aired on October 21, 2011 also as a sneak preview. The official premiere of the first season was on November 7, 2011. Animated by Nickelodeon Animation all episodes aired on Nickelodeon, like related show The Penguins of Madagascar but unlike other related show Dragons: Riders of Berk which airs on Cartoon Network. The season's first official episode averaged 3.1 million in its premiere, slightly behind SpongeBob SquarePants, one of the network's highest rating television series.

Since almost every episode in this season introduces a brand new character, many guest stars including Ava Acres, Pamela Adlon, Diedrich Bader, Maria Bamford, Danny Cooksey, Peter Hastings, Simon Helberg, Amy Hill, April Hong, Toby Huss, John Kassir, Randall Duk Kim, Wayne Knight, David Koechner, Wendie Malick, Malcolm McDowell, Lynn Milgrim, Stephen Root, Paul Rugg, Wallace Shawn, Lauren Tom and Gary Anthony Williams, have appeared in this season.

== Episodes ==
No. overall	No. in season	Title	Directed by	Written by	Storyboarded by	Original release date	Prod. code	US viewers (millions)
1	1	"Scorpion's Sting"	Jim Schumann	Doug Langdale	Lane Lueras and Juan Meza-Leon	September 19, 2011	101	3.1
Sometime after Tai Lung's defeat, Tigress catches River Fever, a deadly disease that can only be cured by the rare sun orchid found in the Valley of the Scorpion. Unaware of the danger that lies ahead of them, Po and Monkey set out to find the orchid, but Monkey is caught and brainwashed by the evil Scorpion. Po must now find the orchid and fend off his brainwashed friend before Tigress dies.: Villain: Scorpion; Note: A sequel to this episode, Love Stings airs later in the series.
2	2	"The Princess and the Po"	Jim Schumann	Doug Langdale	Lane Lueras and Juan Meza-Leon; Sean Petrilak (additional)	October 21, 2011	103	N/A
Po, Tigress and Mantis must escort an Emperor's daughter Mei Li on a peacemaking visit to the Qidan clan. Yet Princess Mei Li and her caravan are targeted by crocodile bandits led by Fung. They soon discover that Princess Mei Li will be given to the Qidan King Temutai as a servant in exchange for peace between the kingdoms.: Villains: Temutai and Fung & the Croc Bandits; Note: A sequel to this episode, Chain Reaction airs later in the series.
3	3	"Sticky Situation"	Gabe Swarr	Scott Kreamer	Luther McLaurin and Alex Soto; James Suhr (additional)	November 7, 2011	102	N/A
Po accidentally destroys the training equipment in the Jade Palace and invites a mechanical genius named Taotie to fix it. Unknown to Po, Taotie is an old enemy of Shifu's and this invitation was all he needed to seek his revenge.: Villain: Taotie
4	4	"Chain Reaction"	Michael Mullen	Kevin Seccia	Fred Cline and Adam Henry	November 8, 2011	104	N/A
Po is driving Tigress nuts with his fanboy ways while they are on a mission together. Things get worse when they are attacked by Fung and the Croc Bandits and fight together. There's one problem: They're chained together. Can they defeat the croc bandits and save Shifu's statue?: Villains: Fung & the Croc Bandits; Note: A prequel to this episode, Good Croc, Bad Croc airs later in the series.
5	5	"Fluttering Finger Mindslip"	Jim Schumann	Jessica Gao	Lane Lueras and Sean Petrilak	November 9, 2011	105	N/A
Po discovers a rare secret move which causes temporary memory loss, but things get out of hand when he uses it on the Furious Five too often. While Po and Master Shifu find a way to undo this, Taotie begins his next attempt to get revenge on Master Shifu using the amnesiac Furious Five to his advantage.: Villain: Taotie
6	6	"Good Croc, Bad Croc"	Michael Mullen	Scott Kreamer	Philip Pignotti and Shane Zalvin	November 10, 2011	111	N/A
Fung helps Po out of a hole and Po agrees to return the favor. But he quickly learns that repaying a favor to Fung might be more difficult than he imagined when Fung states to Po that his brother has been captured by the soldiers of Jong Sung Jai Kai Chow.: Villain: Jong Sung Jai Kai Chow
7	7	"Hometown Hero"	Juan Meza-Leon	Kevin Seccia	Adam Henry and Alex Soto	November 11, 2011	109	N/A
Po visits Mantis' hometown and discovers that Mantis hasn't been entirely honest with the villagers about who the Dragon Warrior really is.
8	8	"Jailhouse Panda"	Michael Mullen	Doug Langdale and Jon Ross	Philip Pignotti and Shane Zalvin	November 18, 2011	117	2.5
Po goes undercover as a prisoner in Chor-Ghom Prison to learn where a diabolical criminal named Tong Fo has hidden the ultra-dangerous weapon called the Sacred War Hammer of Lei Lang.: Villains: Tong Fo and Fung & the Croc Bandits
9	9	"Owl Be Back"	Michael Mullen	Doug Langdale	Philip Pignotti and Shane Zalvin	November 26, 2011	107	N/A
Upon thwarting a raid on the Jade Palace from Temutai and the Qidan Clan with incredible new powers and abilities and fighting styles, Po learns that there have been many Furious Fives before the current one and that the most powerful member has always become evil. He even wonders this when he encounters the most powerful member of the original Furious Five, a strong, powerful owl named Fenghuang.: Villains: Temutai and Fenghuang
10	10	"Bad Po"	Luther McLaurin and Jim Schumann	Jon Ross	Lane Lueras and Sean Petrilak	November 26, 2011	113	N/A
After an incident with the Mystical Mirror of Yin and Yang, Po is acting strangely....he's light, sweet, generous, and kind one minute, then dark, mean, greedy, and violent the next. While word is going around that there might be two of him. Soon the truth comes out, the Mystic Yin Yang Mirror split Po into separate versions of himself: one good and one evil. Now Shifu and the Furious Five must recombine Po's aggressive self with his compassionate self before sunset or the division will become permanent and Bad Po will be unstoppable!: Villains: Evil Po and Fung & the Croc Bandits
11	11	"Sight for Sore Eyes"	Juan Meza-Leon	Doug Langdale	Adam Henry, Peter Ferk and Philip Pignotti; Luther McLaurin and Alex Soto (additionals)	November 27, 2011	108	3.1
Two Kung Fu masters named Master Chao and Master Junjie visit the Jade Palace to check up on Shifu. But when Master Junjie encourages Po to take a peek at their sparring, which is only for the presence of the three masters, it causes the downfall of Shifu and the Furious Five, and Master Junjie replaces the Furious Five members and Po with a team of Kung Fu snow leopards. When his friends turn their backs on him, Po decides to set things right and find out Junjie's plans.: Villains: Junjie and Junjie's Furious Five
12	12	"Rhino's Revenge"	Michael Mullen	Scott Kreamer	Adam Henry and Ryan Kramer	November 27, 2011	106	3.1
On Dragon Warrior Day, Po befriends a bitter rhino named Hundun and helps him get back on his feet—until he learns that Hundun's secret goal is to destroy the Dragon Warrior. Po learns that Hundun is bitter about the day when Tai Lung escaped from Chor-Gom Prison (where Hundun used to work at) and Tai Lung's defeat leaving him without a job.: Villain: Hundun; "Note": This episode takes place before the series premier due to Chor-Gom Prison being reopened after Hundun's defeat.
13	13	"Master Ping"	Michael Mullen	Paul Rugg	Alice Herring and Shane Zalvin; Philip Pignotti (additional)	November 28, 2011	119	N/A
When Mr. Ping's noodle shop is destroyed during Po's fight with three pigs named Bao, Lao, and Tsao who want to learn secret Kung Fu moves, Po reluctantly invites him to stay at the Jade Palace. Before long, Mr. Ping's annoying and controlling ways make themselves known as he drives Po, Shifu and the Furious Five crazy. Bao, Lao, and Tsao soon return and plan to learn the secret moves upon capturing Master Shifu. However, they mistake Mr. Ping for Master Shifu.: Villains: Bao, Lao, & Tsao
14	14	"Ghost of Oogway"	Lane Lueras and Luther McLaurin	Kevin Seccia	Luther McLaurin and Sean Petrilak	November 29, 2011	120	N/A
The Ghost of Grand Master Oogway returns to the Jade Palace to mentor Po, throwing Po and Shifu's relationship into turmoil. Unbeknownst to Po and Shifu, the Ghost of Grand Master Oogway is actually the wicked Master Junjie in disguise in his next plot to rule the Jade Palace.: Villains: Junjie and Junjie's Furious Five
15	15	"The Kung Fu Kid"	Juan Meza-Leon	Scott Kreamer	Julia 'Fitzy' Fitzmaurice and Ryan Kramer	November 30, 2011	122	N/A
When a Kung Fu prodigy named Peng arrives at the Jade Palace, Po's enthusiasm begins to sour when he gets a little jealous of the attention being heaped onto the young master. Meanwhile, Temutai takes interest in Peng and plans to pit his own nephew Jing Mei against Peng. At the end, it is unveiled that Peng is Tai Lung's nephew.: Villains: Temutai and Jing Mei
16	16	"Ladies of the Shade"	Michael Mullen	Joshua Hamilton	Fred Cline and Adam Henry	December 1, 2011	123	N/A
Po befriends a troupe of dancers called the Ladies of the Shade, where he falls for one of the dancers named Song, unaware that they are actually a band of traveling thieves. When the Dragon Chalice (which Grand Master Oogway gave to Master Shifu) goes missing from the Jade Palace, Po (alongside Master Crane and Master Viper) has to disguise himself to infiltrate the band.: Villains: Su and the Umbrella Dancers
17	17	"Big Bro Po"	Lane Lueras	Doug Langdale	Luther McLaurin and Sean Petrilak; Brandon Jeffords (additional)	December 2, 2011	118	2.5
After sending Taotie to jail, Po is forced to care for his son, Bian Zao. Po is yet to determine if Bian Zao really adores him, or if he is just using him to double-cross the panda.: Villains: Taotie and Bian Zao
18	18	"Po Fans Out"	Juan Meza-Leon	Kevin Seccia	Peter Ferk and Philip Pignotti	December 9, 2011	112	N/A
In order to impress his fan club, Po releases a supernatural, monstrous creature called the Mongolian Fist Demon so that he can vanquish the beast in battle—which doesn't exactly go his way.: Villain: Mongolian Fist Demon
19	19	"Challenge Day"	Jim Schumann	Scott Kreamer	Lane Lueras and Sean Petrilak	December 16, 2011	110	N/A
Po is shocked when Shifu informs him that today is "Dragon Warrior Challenge Day." If anyone can defeat Po in battle before sundown, they will become the next Dragon Warrior! One of the challengers to defeat Po ends up being Hundun. But, at the end, Shifu reveals that he made it up.: Villain: Hundun
20	20	"My Favorite Yao"	Luther McLaurin	Joshua Hamilton	Lane Lueras and Sean Petrilak; James Suhr (additional)	December 30, 2011	114	N/A
Po helps Shifu channel his "inner Po" as they try to keep a visiting Kung Fu Master named Master Yao out of Temutai's clutches.: Villain: Temutai
21	21	"In With the Old"	Michael Mullen	Kevin Seccia	Fred Cline and Adam Henry	January 16, 2012	124	N/A
When the Furious Five go out of town, Po has to rely on a Mr. Ping and elderly mahjong player Mr. Yeung and Mrs. Gow for back-up when Temutai and the Qidan Clan are seeking the Helmet of the Invincible Thunder Kick.: Villain: Temutai
22	22	"Has-Been Hero"	Gabe Swarr	Kevin Seccia	Luther McLaurin and Alex Soto; Peter Ferk and James Suhr (additionals)	March 31, 2012 (Note: This episode was seen on the DVD / Blu-ray for Kung Fu Panda 2, which was released on December 13, 2011.)	126	3.6
Po discovers that his favorite wrestler named Kwan is coming to the Valley of Peace, and he is invited to meet his hero in person. Kwan looks weak and feeble as an elderly old ram, and he tells Po that this would be his last fight. Po helps Kwan become strong again, but is tricked. It turns out that Kwan was plotting revenge because of an incident with Po's dumpling (which Po doesn't know about) when he was a panda cub. The dumpling went flying into the air and hit Kwan, which turned him into a wimp. Crane goes back after meeting with Kwan in person, but finds out he isn't weak and feeble at all. He tries to help his love interest Bai Li, but is knocked out by her. He escapes and barely saves Po. Crane tells Po about how strong Kwan really is and Po gets his game on. Po wins at first, but then he lets Kwan win too, which makes it a tie. Then Kwan asked if he could repay Po anyway, so Po asked if he could sign his belly.
23	23	"Love Stings"	Juan Meza-Leon	Joshua Hamilton	Adam Henry and Alex Soto	April 2, 2012	115	2.4
Po tries to get his father a girlfriend, but changes his mind when Mr. Ping reveals he already has a girlfriend, which is none other than Master Scorpion herself. Unfortunately, she isn't exactly Po's favorite person. It is later discovered that it is all a ruse to get revenge on Po.: Villain: Scorpion; Note: This is a sequel to Scorpion's Sting, which aired earlier in the series.
24	24	"Hall of Lame"	Juan Meza-Leon	Kevin Seccia	Adam Henry and Alex Soto	April 3, 2012	116	N/A
Po has to find an awesome trophy for the Hall of Heroes or risk being humiliated in front of the entire village at the upcoming Warrior Festival. During the search for this, Po comes to the aid of Han, whose doll is being targeted by the soldiers of Jong Sung Jai Kai Chow.: Villain: Jong Sung Jai Kai Chow
25	25	"Father Crime"	Michael Mullen	Doug Langdale	Alice Herring and Shane Zalvin	April 4, 2012	121	N/A
When Shifu's father Shirong returns to the Jade Palace, Po thinks the family reunion will be so sweet. He soon learns that Shifu and his father don't get along.: Villains: Fung & the Croc Bandits and Tong Fo
26	26	"Monkey in the Middle"	Lane Lueras	Gene Grillo	Luther McLaurin and Sean Petrilak; Brandon Jeffords (additional)	April 5, 2012	125	N/A
There's a crime wave sweeping the Valley of Peace, but Po's enthusiasm for busting crime takes a hit when he discovers that the culprit might be Monkey.: Villain: Wu Kong

== DVD releases ==
Season	Episodes	Release dates
Season	Episodes	Region 1
1	15 (of 26)	Kung Fu Panda 2: December 13, 2011; Episode: "Has-Been Hero" (22) Good Croc, Bad Croc: June 18, 2013; Episodes: "The Princess and the Po" (2), "Chain Reaction" (4), "Good Croc, Bad Croc" (6), "Jailhouse Panda" (8), "Bad Po" (10), "Po Fans Out" (18) and "Father Crime" (25) The Scorpion Sting: October 15, 2013; Episodes: "Scorpion's Sting" (1), "Owl Be Back" (9), "Love Stings" (23) and "Monkey in the Middle" (26) The Midnight Stranger: March 11, 2014; Episode: "Master Ping" (13) Holiday Hijinks: November 18, 2014 (Redbox exclusive); Episodes: "Hometown Hero" (7) and "Hall of Lame" (24)
