= List of Kung Fu Panda: Legends of Awesomeness episodes =

Kung Fu Panda: Legends of Awesomeness is an American television series based on DreamWorks Animation's Kung Fu Panda franchise. Two special previews aired on Nickelodeon on September 19, 2011, and October 21, 2011, with the official premiere of the series on November 7, 2011. The first official episode of the series averaged 3.1 million in its premiere, slightly behind SpongeBob SquarePants, one of the Nickelodeon's highest rating television series. On March 10, 2011, Nickelodeon announced that the series "has been picked up for 26 additional episodes (for a total of 52) and will debut later this year." A total of 52 episodes were initially ordered for the series. The third season had been confirmed by Oktobor Animation, a New Zealand-based CG animation studio, which has signed to provide animation and post services on the second and third seasons of Kung Fu Panda: Legends of Awesomeness. After they aired as the first two seasons, another 28 episodes were added as the third season. The third season finished airing first in Germany, with episode 80 debuting January 7, 2015, on Nicktoons. The rest of season 3 eventually continued airing in the United States just over a year later. The third season completed airing in the United States on June 29, 2016.

Kung Fu Panda: Legends of Awesomeness features the voice talents of Mick Wingert, Fred Tatasciore, Kari Wahlgren, James Sie, and Max Koch, with Lucy Liu and James Hong reprising their roles from the Kung Fu Panda movies.

== Series overview ==
Season	Episodes		Originally released		
Season	Episodes		First released	Last released	Network
1	26		September 19, 2011	April 5, 2012	Nickelodeon
2	26		April 6, 2012	June 21, 2013	Nickelodeon
3	28	18	June 24, 2013	June 22, 2014	Nickelodeon
3	28	10	February 15, 2016	June 29, 2016 (Note: The official series finale "Emperors Rule" first aired sometime in 2014 in Germany. However, in Germany, the final episode to air from season 3 was "Po the Croc", which aired on January 7, 2015, in that country.)	Nicktoons

== Episodes ==
=== Season 1 (2011–12) ===
The first season of Kung Fu Panda: Legends of Awesomeness consists of 26 episodes.

No. overall	No. in season	Title	Directed by	Written by	Storyboarded by	Original release date	Prod. code	US viewers (millions)
1	1	"Scorpion's Sting"	Jim Schumann	Doug Langdale	Lane Lueras and Juan Meza-Leon	September 19, 2011	101	3.1
2	2	"The Princess and the Po"	Jim Schumann	Doug Langdale	Lane Lueras and Juan Meza-Leon; Sean Petrilak (additional)	October 21, 2011	103	N/A
3	3	"Sticky Situation"	Gabe Swarr	Scott Kreamer	Luther McLaurin and Alex Soto; James Suhr (additional)	November 7, 2011	102	N/A
4	4	"Chain Reaction"	Michael Mullen	Kevin Seccia	Fred Cline and Adam Henry	November 8, 2011	104	N/A
5	5	"Fluttering Finger Mindslip"	Jim Schumann	Jessica Gao	Lane Lueras and Sean Petrilak	November 9, 2011	105	N/A
6	6	"Good Croc, Bad Croc"	Michael Mullen	Scott Kreamer	Philip Pignotti and Shane Zalvin	November 10, 2011	111	N/A
7	7	"Hometown Hero"	Juan Meza-Leon	Kevin Seccia	Adam Henry and Alex Soto	November 11, 2011	109	N/A
8	8	"Jailhouse Panda"	Michael Mullen	Doug Langdale and Jon Ross	Philip Pignotti and Shane Zalvin	November 18, 2011	117	2.5
9	9	"Owl Be Back"	Michael Mullen	Doug Langdale	Philip Pignotti and Shane Zalvin	November 26, 2011	107	N/A
10	10	"Bad Po"	Luther McLaurin and Jim Schumann	Jon Ross	Lane Lueras and Sean Petrilak	November 26, 2011	113	N/A
11	11	"Sight for Sore Eyes"	Juan Meza-Leon	Doug Langdale	Adam Henry, Peter Ferk and Philip Pignotti; Luther McLaurin and Alex Soto (additionals)	November 27, 2011	108	3.1
12	12	"Rhino's Revenge"	Michael Mullen	Scott Kreamer	Adam Henry and Ryan Kramer	November 27, 2011	106	3.1
13	13	"Master Ping"	Michael Mullen	Paul Rugg	Alice Herring and Shane Zalvin; Philip Pignotti (additional)	November 28, 2011	119	N/A
14	14	"Ghost of Oogway"	Lane Lueras and Luther McLaurin	Kevin Seccia	Luther McLaurin and Sean Petrilak	November 29, 2011	120	N/A
15	15	"The Kung Fu Kid"	Juan Meza-Leon	Scott Kreamer	Julia 'Fitzy' Fitzmaurice and Ryan Kramer	November 30, 2011	122	N/A
16	16	"Ladies of the Shade"	Michael Mullen	Joshua Hamilton	Fred Cline and Adam Henry	December 1, 2011	123	N/A
17	17	"Big Bro Po"	Lane Lueras	Doug Langdale	Luther McLaurin and Sean Petrilak; Brandon Jeffords (additional)	December 2, 2011	118	2.5
18	18	"Po Fans Out"	Juan Meza-Leon	Kevin Seccia	Peter Ferk and Philip Pignotti	December 9, 2011	112	N/A
19	19	"Challenge Day"	Jim Schumann	Scott Kreamer	Lane Lueras and Sean Petrilak	December 16, 2011	110	N/A
20	20	"My Favorite Yao"	Luther McLaurin	Joshua Hamilton	Lane Lueras and Sean Petrilak; James Suhr (additional)	December 30, 2011	114	N/A
21	21	"In With the Old"	Michael Mullen	Kevin Seccia	Fred Cline and Adam Henry	January 16, 2012	124	N/A
22	22	"Has-Been Hero"	Gabe Swarr	Kevin Seccia	Luther McLaurin and Alex Soto; Peter Ferk and James Suhr (additionals)	March 31, 2012 (Note: This episode was seen on the DVD / Blu-ray for Kung Fu Panda 2, which was released on December 13, 2011.)	126	3.6
23	23	"Love Stings"	Juan Meza-Leon	Joshua Hamilton	Adam Henry and Alex Soto	April 2, 2012	115	2.4
24	24	"Hall of Lame"	Juan Meza-Leon	Kevin Seccia	Adam Henry and Alex Soto	April 3, 2012	116	N/A
25	25	"Father Crime"	Michael Mullen	Doug Langdale	Alice Herring and Shane Zalvin	April 4, 2012	121	N/A
26	26	"Monkey in the Middle"	Lane Lueras	Gene Grillo	Luther McLaurin and Sean Petrilak; Brandon Jeffords (additional)	April 5, 2012	125	N/A

=== Season 2 (2012–13) ===
The second season of Kung Fu Panda: Legends of Awesomeness consists of 26 episodes.

No. overall	No. in season	Title	Directed by	Written by	Storyboarded by	Original release date	Prod. code	US viewers (millions)
27	1	"Kung Fu Day Care"	Juan Meza-Leon	Doug Langdale	Ryan Kramer and Julia "Fitzy" Fizmaurice	April 6, 2012	201	N/A
28	2	"Royal Pain"	Lane Lueras	Gene Grillo	Sean Petrilak and Aaron Hammersley; Luther McLaurin and Julia "Fitzy" Fizmaurice (additionals)	September 26, 2012	214	2.0
29	3	"The Most Dangerous Po"	Michael Mullen	Gene Grillo	Alice Herring and Le Tang; Aaron Hammersley (additional)	October 13, 2012	203	2.2
30	4	"The Po Who Cried Ghost"	Michael Mullen	Gene Grillo	Alice Herring and Le Tang; Luther McLaurin and Julia "Fitzy" Fizmaurice (additionals)	October 27, 2012	207	1.6
31	5	"Kung Shoes"	Lane Lueras	Doug Langdale	Luther McLaurin and Sean Petrilak; Luther McLaurin and Julia "Fitzy" Fizmaurice (additionals)	November 3, 2012	209	2.7
32	6	"Bosom Enemies"	Lane Lueras	Gene Grillo	Aaron Hammersley and Sean Petrilak; Luther McLaurin and Julia "Fitzy" Fizmaurice (additionals)	November 10, 2012	215	2.3
33 34	7 8	"Enter the Dragon"	Aaron Hammersley Michael Mullen	Scott Kreamer Peter Hastings	Paul Linsley, Ryan Kramer and Aaron Hammersley; Luther McLaurin, Julia "Fitzy" Fizmaurice and Jean-Sebastien Duclos (additionals) Alice Herring, Le Tang, Michael Mullen and Kenji Ono; Luther McLaurin, Julia "Fitzy" Fizmaurice and Jean-Sebastien Duclos (additionals)	November 12, 2012	220 221	2.9
35	9	"Master and the Panda"	Michael Mullen	Gene Grillo	Alice Herring and Le Tang; Mark Sperber, Luther McLaurin and Julia "Fitzy" Fizmaurice (additionals)	November 24, 2012	212	2.4
36	10	"Present Tense"	Michael Mullen	Doug Langdale	Alice Herring and Le Tang; Luther McLaurin and Julia "Fitzy" Fizmaurice (additionals)	December 8, 2012	213	2.5
37	11	"Shifu's Back"	Michael Mullen	Paul Rugg	Alice Herring and Le Tang; Luther McLaurin (additional)	January 14, 2013	205	2.1
38	12	"Terror Cotta"	Michael Mullen	Doug Langdale	Alice Herring and Eddie Trigueros; Luther McLaurin, Carrie Liao and Jean-Sebastien Duclos (additionals)	January 15, 2013	225	2.1
39	13	"The Spirit Orbs of Master Ding"	Lane Lueras	Tom Sheppard	Sean Petrilak and Mark Sperber; Julia "Fitzy" Fizmaurice, Luther McLaurin and Jean-Sebastien Duclos (additionals)	January 16, 2013	226	1.8
40	14	"The Maltese Mantis"	Michael Mullen	Paul Rugg	Alice Herring and Brandon Jeffords; Le Tang (additional)	January 17, 2013	202	2.0
41	15	"Invitation Only"	Michael Mullen	Paul Rugg	Alice Herring and Le Tang; Luther McLaurin, Julia "Fitzy" Fizmaurice and Jean-Sebastien Duclos (additionals)	January 18, 2013	217	1.7
42	16	"The Midnight Stranger"	Juan Meza-Leon	Doug Langdale	Ryan Kramer and Julia "Fitzy" Fizmaurice; Luther McLaurin (additional)	January 20, 2013	206	1.9
43	17	"Shoot the Messenger"	Lane Lueras	Kevin Campbell	Mark Sperber and Sean Petrilak; Luther McLaurin, Julia "Fitzy" Fizmaurice and Jean-Sebastien Duclos (additionals)	January 22, 2013	219	2.1
44	18	"A Tigress Tale"	Juan Meza-Leon and Gabe Swarr	Paul Rugg	Ryan Kramer and Paul Linsley; Luther McLaurin, Julia "Fitzy" Fizmaurice and Mark Sperber (additionals)	January 23, 2013	211	1.9
45	19	"Crane on a Wire"	Lane Lueras	Gene Grillo	Luther McLaurin and Sean Petrilak; Brandon Jeffords (additional)	January 24, 2013	204	2.0
46	20	"The Secret Museum of Kung Fu"	Michael Mullen	Doug Langdale	Le Tang and Alice Herring; Luther McLaurin, Julia "Fitzy" Fizmaurice, Jean-Sebastien Duclos and Kenji Ono (additionals)	January 25, 2013	224	1.9
47	21	"Bride of Po"	Michael Mullen	Tom Sheppard Juan Meza-Leon	Paul Linsley and Alice Herring; Carrie Liao, Luther McLaurin and Jean-Sebastien Duclos (additionals)	February 14, 2013	303	N/A
48	22	"Five is Enough"	Aaron Hammersley	Gene Grillo	Paul Linsley and Ryan Kramer; Luther McLaurin, Carrie Liao and Jean-Sebastien Duclos (additionals)	June 17, 2013	301	1.7
49	23	"Mama Told Me Not to Kung Fu"	Lane Lueras	Doug Langdale	Sean Petrilak and Mark Sperber; Luther McLaurin, Julia "Fitzy" Fizmaurice and Jean-Sebastien Duclos (additionals)	June 18, 2013	222	2.0
50	24	"Secret Admirer"	Gabe Swarr and Aaron Hammersley	Katie Mattila	Paul Linsley and Ryan Kramer; Luther McLaurin and Jean-Sebastien Duclos (additionals)	June 19, 2013	216	1.8
51	25	"Qilin Time"	Juan Meza-Leon	Paul Rugg	Ryan Kramer and Julia "Fitzy" Fizmaurice; Luther McLaurin and Paul Linsley (additionals)	June 20, 2013	210	1.6
52	26	"Huge"	Aaron Hammersley	Gene Grillo	Ryan Kramer and Paul Linsley; Luther McLaurin, Jean-Sebastien Duclos and Julia "Fitzy" Fizmaurice (additionals)	June 21, 2013	223	1.9

=== Season 3 (2013–16) ===
The third season of Kung Fu Panda: Legends of Awesomeness consists of 28 episodes.

No. overall	No. in season	Title	Directed by	Written by	Storyboarded by	Original release date	Prod. code	US viewers (millions)
Nickelodeon
53	1	"Shifu's Ex"	Aaron Hammersley	Gene Grillo	Paul Linsley and Ryan Kramer; Luther McLaurin, Julia "Fitzy" Fitzmaurice and Jean-Sebastien Duclos (additionals)	June 24, 2013	218	2.2
54	2	"War of the Noodles"	Lane Lueras	Doug Langdale	Sean Petrilak and Mark Sperber; Julia "Fitzy" Fitzmaurice, Carrie Liao, Jean-Sebastien Duclos and Luther McLaurin (additionals)	June 25, 2013	305	1.9
55	3	"The Break Up"	Lane Lueras	Katie Mattila	Luther McLaurin and Sean Petrilak; Luther McLaurin (additional)	June 26, 2013	208	2.0
56	4	"Mind Over Manners"	Aaron Hammersley	Kevin Campbell	Ryan Kramer and Kenji Ono; Carrie Liao, Jean-Sebastien Duclos and Luther McLaurin (additionals)	June 27, 2013	304	2.2
57	5	"A Thousand and Twenty Questions"	Lane Lueras	Brandon Sawyer	Mark Sperber and Sean Petrilak; Julia "Fitzy" Fitzmaurice, Carrie Liao, Luther McLaurin and Jean-Sebastien Duclos (additionals)	June 28, 2013	302	2.1
58	6	"The Way of the Prawn"	Michael Mullen	Gene Grillo	Alice Herring and Paul Linsley; Luther McLaurin, Carrie Liao and Jean-Sebastien Duclos (additionals)	July 1, 2013	306	1.9
59	7	"Mouth Off"	Aaron Hammersley	Doug Langdale	Kenji Ono and Ryan Kramer; Luther McLaurin, Carrie Liao and Jean-Sebastien Duclos (additionals)	July 2, 2013	307	2.0
60	8	"Serpent's Tooth"	Lane Lueras	Gene Grillo	Mark Sperber and Sean Petrilak; Julia "Fitzy" Fitzmaurice, Luther McLaurin, Carrie Liao and Jean-Sebastien Duclos (additionals)	July 3, 2013	308	1.6
61	9	"The Goosefather"	Michael Mullen	Katie Mattila	Paul Linsley and Alice Herring; Luther McLaurin, Jean-Sebastien Duclos and Carrie Liao (additionals)	January 11, 2014	309	1.7
62	10	"Po Picks a Pocket"	Lane Lueras	Gene Grillo	Sean Petrilak and Mark Sperber; Julia "Fitzy" Fitzmaurice, Luther McLaurin, Jean-Sebastien Duclos and Carrie Liao (additionals)	January 26, 2014	310	2.2
63	11	"Croc You Like A Hurricane"	Aaron Hammersley	Doug Langdale	Ryan Kramer and Kenji Ono; Luther McLaurin, Carrie Liao and Jean-Sebastien Duclos (additionals)	February 2, 2014	311	1.7
64	12	"Crazy Little Ling Called Love"	Aaron Hammersley and Luther McLaurin	Doug Langdale	Natasha Wicke, Kenji Ono, Carrie Liao and Ryan Kramer; Luther McLaurin and Jean-Sebastien Duclos (additionals)	February 9, 2014	319	2.3
65	13	"Kung Fu Club"	Lane Lueras	Gene Grillo	Mark Sperber, Sean Petrilak and Luther McLaurin; Julia "Fitzy" Fitzmaurice and Jean-Sebastien Duclos (additionals)	February 16, 2014	314	2.3
66	14	"The Hunger Game"	Michael Mullen	John P. McCann	Paul Linsley and Alice Herring; Jean-Sebastien Duclos and Luther McLaurin (additionals)	February 23, 2014	315	2.2
67	15	"A Stitch in Time"	Aaron Hammersley and Luther Mclaurin	Doug Langdale	Ryan Kramer and Kenji Ono; Jean-Sebastien Duclos (additional)	March 2, 2014	316	2.1
68	16	"Eternal Chord"	Lane Lueras	Gene Grillo	Julia "Fitzy" Fitzmaurice, Sean Petrilak and Mark Sperber; Jean-Sebastien Duclos and Luther McLaurin (additionals)	June 8, 2014	317	2.0
69	17	"Apocalypse Yao"	Michael Mullen	Doug Langdale	Alice Herring and Paul Linsley; Luther McLaurin, Jean-Sebastien Duclos and Mark Garcia (additionals)	June 15, 2014	318	N/A
70	18	"The Real Dragon Warrior"	Lane Lueras	Allan Rice	Mark Sperber and Sean Petrilak; Luther McLaurin, Jean-Sebastien Duclos, Julia "Fitzy" Fitzmaurice and Mark Garcia (additionals)	June 22, 2014	320	N/A
Nicktoons
71	19	"Youth in Re-Volt"	Aaron Hammersley	Doug Langdale	Carrie Liao and Kenji Ono; Luther McLaurin, Jean-Sebastien Duclos and Mark Garcia (additionals)	February 15, 2016 (Note: This episode first aired on December 30, 2014 in Germany. Also, beginning with this episode, new episodes in the United States premiered on Nicktoons instead of Nickelodeon.)	322	N/A
72	20	"Forsaken and Furious"	Lane Lueras	Gene Grillo	Sean Petrilak, Julia "Fitzy" Fitzmaurice, John Aoshima and Lane Lueras; Luther McLaurin and Mark Garcia (additionals)	February 16, 2016 (Note: This episode first aired on January 5, 2015 in Germany.)	326	N/A
73	21	"Po the Croc"	Aaron Hammersley	Doug Langdale	Carrie Liao, Jean-Sebastien Duclos and Alice Herring; Luther McLaurin (additional)	February 17, 2016 (Note: This episode first aired on January 7, 2015 in Germany.)	328	0.31
74	22	"Camp Ping"	Michael Mullen	Gene Grillo	Paul Linsley and Alice Herring; Luther McLaurin, Jean-Sebastien Duclos and Mark Garcia (additionals)	February 18, 2016 (Note: This episode first aired on January 6, 2015 in Germany.)	327	0.32
75	23	"Goose Chase"	Michael Mullen	Doug Langdale	Alice Herring and Paul Linsley; Luther McLaurin, Jean-Sebastien Duclos and Mark Garcia (additionals)	February 19, 2016 (Note: This episode first aired on January 1, 2015 in Germany.)	324	0.30
76	24	"The First Five"	Michael Mullen	Gene Grillo	Paul Linsley and Alice Herring; Luther McLaurin, Jean-Sebastien Duclos and Mark Garcia (additionals)	June 8, 2016 (Note: This episode premiered in other countries before the United States. The release date for the first official broadcast of this episode is currently unknown. The earliest date is from 2014 in Germany.)	321	N/A
77	25	"See No Weevil"	Lane Lueras	Gene Grillo	Mark Sperber, Sean Petrilak and Lane Lueras; Julia "Fitzy" Fitzmaurice, Luther McLaurin, Jean-Sebastien Duclos and Mark Garcia (additionals)	June 15, 2016 (Note: This episode first aired on December 31, 2014 in Germany.)	323	N/A
78	26	"Face Full of Fear"	Aaron Hammersley	Allan Rice	Kenji Ono, Carrie Liao and Aaron Hammersley; Luther McLaurin, Jean-Sebastien Duclos and Mark Garcia (additionals)	June 22, 2016 (Note: This episode first aired on January 2, 2015 in Germany.)	325	N/A
79	27	"Emperors Rule"	Michael Mullen	Doug Langdale	Alice Herring, Paul Linsley and Michael Mullen; Luther McLaurin, Jean-Sebastien Duclos and Carrie Liao (additionals)	June 29, 2016	312	N/A
80	28	"Emperors Rule"	Aaron Hammersley	Gene Grillo	Ryan Kramer, Kenji Ono, Aaron Hammersley and Natasha Wicke; Luther McLaurin, Carrie Liao and Jean-Sebastien Duclos (additionals)	June 29, 2016	313	N/A
