= Kung Fu Panda: Legends of Awesomeness season 2 =

Kung Fu Panda: Legends of Awesomeness
- Season 2
- No. of episodes: 26

Release
- Original network: Nickelodeon
- Original release: April 6, 2012 – June 21, 2013

Season chronology
- ← Previous; Season 1 Next → Season 3

This is a list of episodes for the second season of Nickelodeon's animated television series, Kung Fu Panda: Legends of Awesomeness. The first episode, a sneak peek, aired on April 6, 2012, and the regular run began airing September 26, 2012.

== Episodes ==
No. overall	No. in season	Title	Directed by	Written by	Storyboarded by	Original release date	Prod. code	US viewers (millions)
27	1	"Kung Fu Day Care"	Juan Meza-Leon	Doug Langdale	Ryan Kramer and Julia "Fitzy" Fizmaurice	April 6, 2012	201	N/A
Po and Tigress rescue young goose named Zan from Fung and his gang of crocodile bandits, who had kidnapped Zan and were holding him for ransom. Crane and Viper are then sent to find Zan's parents, while Tigress must look after the child, who has taken a shine on her. Not particularly fond on kids, after several awkward attempts to entertain Zan, Tigress starts teaching him kung fu. After another failed attempt to kidnap Zan, the crocodiles are joined by Fung's younger but larger cousin Lidong. Lured to a farm, Po, Shifu, Monkey and Mantis get attacked by the crocodile bandits, while Tigress stays in the Palace as the child's protector. There, they are attacked by Lidong and Fung, who manages to capture Zan, but Tigress eventually defeats them, kicking Lidong off the Palace, and then obtains a motherly role to the child. At the end, Zan's mother, who turns out to be the Emperor's sister, comes for Zan, who has meanwhile endeared to Tigress.: Villains: Fung & the Croc Bandits and Lidong
28	2	"Royal Pain"	Lane Lueras	Gene Grillo	Sean Petrilak and Aaron Hammersley; Luther McLaurin and Julia "Fitzy" Fizmaurice (additionals)	September 26, 2012	214	2.0
Po volunteers to train the Emperor's insecure and clumsy grandson Lu the skills of manhood to become a worthy member of the imperial family. After many failed attempts to train Lu, and under the threat of being executed for breaking promise, Po gives Lu a "magic" bean pod, which gives Lu a confidence. But when Po successfully trains Lu, Meng Tao who is the Emperor's servant, assigns Hundun to make sure Lu does not get trained, so he can take Lu's place. When challenged by Hundun and Meng Tao, Tao crushes the beans, and Po reveals that there is no secret behind them. Aware of his skills, an encouraged Lu defeats Hundun and Tao, and becomes a worthy member of the imperial family.: Villains: Meng Tao and Hundun
29	3	"The Most Dangerous Po"	Michael Mullen	Gene Grillo	Alice Herring and Le Tang; Aaron Hammersley (additional)	October 13, 2012	203	2.2
Invited to famed and retired General Tsin (voiced by R. Lee Ermey) Po joins the paranoid General on a hunt for Hundun the Rhino, who was lured there with the promise of a free pie. Although Po tries to warn currently innocent Hundun to run away, Hundun misinterprets the warnings, and Po defeats him after a short fight. The General then takes Hundun in a room full of famous villains, including Temutai, Scorpion, Fung, Gar-hi, Taotie, Bao, and Jing Mei, all of whom have been subjected to suspended animation. Realizing that the General has lost his mind, Po challenges the General, but blinded by a spray, he flees away. After a brief preach by his conscience, Po returns to the General's place, where he is taken as a prisoner and put in a sleeping chamber. But when the general releases the sleeping gas, the hoses, which have been switched by Po, starts pumping the wakening gas, unfreezing all villains. Defeated by the prisoners, Po sends the General to Chorh-Gom Prison.: Villain: General Tsin
30	4	"The Po Who Cried Ghost"	Michael Mullen	Gene Grillo	Alice Herring and Le Tang; Luther McLaurin and Julia "Fitzy" Fizmaurice (additionals)	October 27, 2012	207	1.6
Po tells the Five the story of the jiangshi (hopping ghosts), but the team don't believe him. Shifu then informs Po there have been acclaimed sightings of the ghosts at the valley cemetery. Upon arrival, the sightings turned out to be pranksters wearing masks. When they spend the night however, Po encounters a real jiangshi, but it vanishes before Shifu can see it. But once they get back to the palace, the ghosts follow them and kidnap Shifu. Po, Tigress and Monkey then return to the cemetery, where they discover the mastermind behind the jiangshi: the Undertaker (the cemetery caretaker), who then reveals a zombified Shifu. After an intense and difficult struggle, Po manages to get the ghosts to turn on the Undertaker, except Shifu. Po then turns himself into a jiangshi to fight and defeat Shifu, and Tigress and Monkey manage to cure both of them by exposing them to the morning sunrise. In the end Po makes them all admit he was right because no one believed him.: Villain: The Undertaker of the Valley of Peace Cemetery
31	5	"Kung Shoes"	Lane Lueras	Doug Langdale	Luther McLaurin and Sean Petrilak; Luther McLaurin and Julia "Fitzy" Fizmaurice (additionals)	November 3, 2012	209	2.7
To heighten his kung fu abilities and get himself out of training with Shifu, Po buys magical shoes but problems arise when the shoes get him a new place and Mantis finds out. In the end, it turns out they knew all along, and it was just a ruse to get him to admit it. The shoes come to life as the old lady warned him about and start to attack. After Po stops them with water he has to train again. The original pair sneak off but is captured by the lady who takes them back with her.: Villains: The Magic Shoes
32	6	"Bosom Enemies"	Lane Lueras	Gene Grillo	Aaron Hammersley and Sean Petrilak; Luther McLaurin and Julia "Fitzy" Fizmaurice (additionals)	November 10, 2012	215	2.3
After being defeated and humiliated by Po, Taotie has a nervous breakdown. Po apologizes and ends up giving him a new purpose in life. However, he later gives Taotie the information he needs to defeat Po and the Five. He decides to use it against them after Po calls him an "assistant".: Villain: Taotie
33 34	7 8	"Enter the Dragon"	Aaron Hammersley Michael Mullen	Scott Kreamer Peter Hastings	Paul Linsley, Ryan Kramer and Aaron Hammersley; Luther McLaurin, Julia "Fitzy" Fizmaurice and Jean-Sebastien Duclos (additionals) Alice Herring, Le Tang, Michael Mullen and Kenji Ono; Luther McLaurin, Julia "Fitzy" Fizmaurice and Jean-Sebastien Duclos (additionals)	November 12, 2012	220 221	2.9
Po and the Furious Five come across a Chinese Dragon from the Underworld named Ke-Pa who is invincible to the powers of kung fu, and it's up to Po to stop Ke-Pa from ruling China.: Villains: Ke-Pa, Underworld Demons, and Fung & the Croc Bandits; Note: This is a double length 45 minute special.
35	9	"Master and the Panda"	Michael Mullen	Gene Grillo	Alice Herring and Le Tang; Mark Sperber, Luther McLaurin and Julia "Fitzy" Fizmaurice (additionals)	November 24, 2012	212	2.4
Po's friend Peng returns to the Valley of Peace and has learned all about his uncle Tai Lung. Meanwhile, Temutai unearths the Gong Lu Medallion in order to enhance his abilities only to find out that it also increases the wearer's darkest willings.: Villain: Temutai
36	10	"Present Tense"	Michael Mullen	Doug Langdale	Alice Herring and Le Tang; Luther McLaurin and Julia "Fitzy" Fizmaurice (additionals)	December 8, 2012	213	2.5
As the annual Winter Festival approaches, Po doesn't have enough money to buy his dad the awesome present he deserves, so he takes a job as a bounty hunter to capture a dangerous escaped convict for the reward.
37	11	"Shifu's Back"	Michael Mullen	Paul Rugg	Alice Herring and Le Tang; Luther McLaurin (additional)	January 14, 2013	205	2.1
When Shifu throws out his back (thanks to Po), the panda must stand in as the master of the Jade Palace while an important bureaucrat visits.: Villains: Bao, Lao, & Tsao
38	12	"Terror Cotta"	Michael Mullen	Doug Langdale	Alice Herring and Eddie Trigueros; Luther McLaurin, Carrie Liao and Jean-Sebastien Duclos (additionals)	January 15, 2013	225	2.1
After Fung fires his gang, he discovers a secret formula for building living terracotta warriors, but when his grouchy dad takes over the business, it's up to Po and Fung's old gang to stop his monstrous, manufactured army.: Villains: Fung, Bing, and Terra Cotta Warriors
39	13	"The Spirit Orbs of Master Ding"	Lane Lueras	Tom Sheppard	Sean Petrilak and Mark Sperber; Julia "Fitzy" Fizmaurice, Luther McLaurin and Jean-Sebastien Duclos (additionals)	January 16, 2013	226	1.8
Tigress' jealousy of Po and his skills gets the best of her when she accidentally releases the Spirit Orbs of Master Ding, so they both journey to Mugu Mountain to prevent the Orbs from returning to their owner. However, Master Ding's Ghost possesses Po and Tigress must stop Ding before he unleashes his powers and seeks vengeance against all those who imprisoned him.: Villain: The Ghost of Master Ding
40	14	"The Maltese Mantis"	Michael Mullen	Paul Rugg	Alice Herring and Brandon Jeffords; Le Tang (additional)	January 17, 2013	202	2.0
Po and Mantis visit a fan convention full of costumed geeks and action figure combat, but when Po's comic excitement accidentally paralyses Mantis and loses him to Taotie, he and Shifu must retrieve him before the paralysis spell becomes permanent.: Villain: Taotie
41	15	"Invitation Only"	Michael Mullen	Paul Rugg	Alice Herring and Le Tang; Luther McLaurin, Julia "Fitzy" Fizmaurice and Jean-Sebastien Duclos (additionals)	January 18, 2013	217	1.7
Po is downhearted when he's not invited to a banquet due to his poor table manners, but he's not the only one who's unhappy about not getting an invitation.: Villain: Temutai
42	16	"The Midnight Stranger"	Juan Meza-Leon	Doug Langdale	Ryan Kramer and Julia "Fitzy" Fizmaurice; Luther McLaurin (additional)	January 20, 2013	206	1.9
When Kung Fu is outlawed, Po turns to donning a mask as the legendary Midnight Stranger to fight crime.: Note: this episode is actually a prequel of episode 11 of season 2: "Shifu's Back".; Villains: Pig Bandits and Lidong
43	17	"Shoot the Messenger"	Lane Lueras	Kevin Campbell	Mark Sperber and Sean Petrilak; Luther McLaurin, Julia "Fitzy" Fizmaurice and Jean-Sebastien Duclos (additionals)	January 22, 2013	219	2.1
Po and Tigress must stop a messenger from delivering a scroll that could start an eternal war in China, but this tough goat isn't going down without a fight.
44	18	"A Tigress Tale"	Juan Meza-Leon and Gabe Swarr	Paul Rugg	Ryan Kramer and Paul Linsley; Luther McLaurin, Julia "Fitzy" Fizmaurice and Mark Sperber (additionals)	January 23, 2013	211	1.9
Tigress is recruited by Mistress Mugan to train with her at the Garnet Palace, but when she starts being held against her will, it's up to Po to bring her home.: Villain: Mugan
45	19	"Crane on a Wire"	Lane Lueras	Gene Grillo	Luther McLaurin and Sean Petrilak; Brandon Jeffords (additional)	January 24, 2013	204	2.0
Po must help Crane regain his confidence after he is humiliated at a charity event.: Villain: Fenghuang
46	20	"The Secret Museum of Kung Fu"	Michael Mullen	Doug Langdale	Le Tang and Alice Herring; Luther McLaurin, Julia "Fitzy" Fizmaurice, Jean-Sebastien Duclos and Kenji Ono (additionals)	January 25, 2013	224	1.9
With Po and the Furious Five at each other's throats, Shifu tries to make them bond by taking them on a disastrous road trip.: Villains: Heilang and the Lin Kuei; Note: This episode takes place after Mama Told Me Not to Kung Fu.
47	21	"Bride of Po"	Michael Mullen	Tom Sheppard Juan Meza-Leon	Paul Linsley and Alice Herring; Carrie Liao, Luther McLaurin and Jean-Sebastien Duclos (additionals)	February 14, 2013	303	N/A
Po gets himself engaged to a girl who seems to be his perfect match, but does she really love him, or just using him to stop being the Dragon Warrior?: Villains: Junjie and Junjie's Furious Five; Note: This episode is a Valentine's Day special.
48	22	"Five is Enough"	Aaron Hammersley	Gene Grillo	Paul Linsley and Ryan Kramer; Luther McLaurin, Carrie Liao and Jean-Sebastien Duclos (additionals)	June 17, 2013	301	1.7
Shifu is worried that he's getting too old for his job, and he hears that Master Chao wants Po to replace him. Meanwhile an old villain returns to seek revenge on Shifu.: Villain: Pai Mei
49	23	"Mama Told Me Not to Kung Fu"	Lane Lueras	Doug Langdale	Sean Petrilak and Mark Sperber; Luther McLaurin, Julia "Fitzy" Fizmaurice and Jean-Sebastien Duclos (additionals)	June 18, 2013	222	2.0
Crane's overprotective mom visits the Valley of Peace. Crane reveals to Po that his mom hates Kung Fu so he promised her that he would never have anything to do with it. He also told her that he runs an Inn at the Jade Palace. Crane asks Po and the others to help him keep his secret from his mom.: Villains: Heilang and the Lin Kuei; Note: This episode takes place before The Secret Museum of Kung Fu, since the Lin Kuei are introduced as new characters
50	24	"Secret Admirer"	Gabe Swarr and Aaron Hammersley	Katie Mattila	Paul Linsley and Ryan Kramer; Luther McLaurin and Jean-Sebastien Duclos (additionals)	June 19, 2013	216	1.8
When Monkey falls in love with Superintendent Woo's daughter, Po decides to play a prank on him by writing a fake love letter.: Villains: Bao, Lao, & Tsao
51	25	"Qilin Time"	Juan Meza-Leon	Paul Rugg	Ryan Kramer and Julia "Fitzy" Fizmaurice; Luther McLaurin and Paul Linsley (additionals)	June 20, 2013	210	1.6
Po is embarrassed when his dad takes him on an expedition to find the Qilin, a beastly monster that is only found at night in a spooky forest. They soon find out, however, that this creature is more than real.: Villain: General Tsin (voiced by R. Lee Ermey)
52	26	"Huge"	Aaron Hammersley	Gene Grillo	Ryan Kramer and Paul Linsley; Luther McLaurin, Jean-Sebastien Duclos and Julia "Fitzy" Fizmaurice (additionals)	June 21, 2013	223	1.9
Mantis ingests a growth potion that increases his size, but he soon learns that being big is no life for an insect.: Villains: Fung & the Croc Bandits and Lidong

== DVD releases ==
Season	Episodes	Release dates
Season	Episodes	Region 1
2	10 (of 26)	The Scorpion Sting: October 15, 2013; Episodes: "Kung Shoes" (31), "Crane On A Wire" (45) and "Qilin Time" (51) The Midnight Stranger: March 11, 2014; Episodes: "Shifu's Back" (37), "Terror Cotta" (38), "The Midnight Stranger" (42), "Shoot the Messenger" (43), "Secret Admirer" (50) and "Huge" (52) Holiday Hijinks: November 18, 2014 (Redbox exclusive); Episode: "Present Tense" (36)
