= Kung Fu Panda: Legends of Awesomeness =

American animated television series

- Genre: Action-adventure; Comedy; Martial arts
- Based on: Kung Fu Panda by DreamWorks Animation
- Developed by: Peter Hastings
- Voices of: Mick Wingert; Fred Tatasciore; Kari Wahlgren; Lucy Liu; Amir Talai; James Sie; Max Koch; James Hong
- Composers: Jeremy Zuckerman; Benjamin Wynn
- Country of origin: United States
- Original language: English
- No. of seasons: 3
- No. of episodes: 80 (list of episodes)

Production
- Executive producers: Peter Hastings; Cheryl Holliday (season 1); Bret Haaland (seasons 2–3)
- Producers: Andrew Huebner; Dean Hoff (season 1)
- Running time: 23 minutes
- Production companies: DreamWorks Animation Television; Nickelodeon Animation Studio

Original release
- Network: Nickelodeon
- Release: September 19, 2011 – June 22, 2014
- Network: Nicktoons
- Release: February 15 – June 29, 2016

Kung Fu Panda: Legends of Awesomeness is an American animated comedy television series produced by Nickelodeon Animation Studio in association with DreamWorks Animation Television, based on DreamWorks Animation's Kung Fu Panda franchise. It serves as a bridge between the first and second films, following Po's training to become a successful Dragon Warrior, whereas the second film is, according to the series' developer Peter Hastings, "not unlike a very long, super-deluxe 3-D version of one of our episodes."

The series was originally set to air on Nickelodeon in 2010, but it was pushed back to 2011 instead. The series premiered with a special preview on September 19, 2011, and began airing regularly on November 7. Broadcast in the United States ceased partway through the third and final season, though all remaining had aired in countries such as Germany (through Nicktoons) and Canada (through YTV). In 2016, Nicktoons in the United States began running commercials announcing the premiere of new episodes; it was subsequently revealed that five of the ten unaired episodes would air from February 15 to 19. The final episode aired on June 29, 2016.

Besides Lucy Liu and James Hong, who reprise their roles as Viper and Mr. Ping from the film the cast features new voice actors for the characters of Po (Mick Wingert), Master Shifu (Fred Tatasciore), Tigress (Kari Wahlgren), Crane (Amir Talai), Monkey (James Sie), and Mantis (Max Koch).

Netflix commissioned another series, Kung Fu Panda: The Dragon Knight, which premiered in 2022. Peter Hastings, the developer of Legends of Awesomeness, returned as an executive producer. Unlike Legends of Awesomeness however, Jack Black reprised his role as Po from the films.

== Synopsis ==
Po and the Furious Five defend the Valley of Peace from villains of different kinds. All the while, Po makes mistakes, learns lessons, learns more about the history of kung fu, and meets other famous kung fu masters.

== Episodes ==
Season	Episodes		Originally released		
Season	Episodes		First released	Last released	Network
1	26		September 19, 2011	April 5, 2012	Nickelodeon
2	26		April 6, 2012	June 21, 2013	Nickelodeon
3	28	18	June 24, 2013	June 22, 2014	Nickelodeon
3	28	10	February 15, 2016	June 29, 2016 (Note: The official series finale "Emperors Rule" first aired sometime in 2014 in Germany. However, in Germany, the final episode to air from season 3 was "Po the Croc", which aired on January 7, 2015, in that country.)	Nicktoons

== Voice cast ==
- Mick Wingert as Po
- Fred Tatasciore as Shifu
- Kari Wahlgren as Tigress
- Lucy Liu as Viper
- Amir Talai as Crane
- James Sie as Monkey
- Max Koch as Mantis
- James Hong as Mr. Ping
- Peter Hastings as Apple Cart Duck

== Development ==
The series was DreamWorks Animation's second co-production with Nickelodeon. The two companies previously partnered on The Penguins of Madagascar.

The show's musical score is done by the Track Team, most Chinese musical instruments including erhu, zhonghu, gaohu, bawu, hulusi, xiao, dizi, guqin, sanxian, suona, guanzi, xun etc. by well-known multi-instrumentalist Hong Wang. In addition, Sifu Kisu was the martial arts consultant for the show as he was on the Avatar: The Last Airbender series.

== Broadcast ==
Kung Fu Panda: Legends of Awesomeness took part in Nickelodeon's revamp to their cartoon season on TV. As an early promotion, Po was featured in a Nickelodeon bumper alongside other characters. On July 23, an exclusive sneak peek of the show was shown at the 2011 San Diego Comic-Con, with producers and members of the voice cast present at the panel. A sneak peek episode was released for the DVD / Blu-ray release for Kung Fu Panda 2 on December 13, 2011. In addition, two sneak preview episodes aired (one on September 19, 2011, and another on October 21, 2011) before the official premiere of the show. In June 2018, it was announced that the series will stream on Hulu.

=== Other dubbed versions ===
In 2021, Bangladeshi television channel Duronto started to broadcast a Bengali dubbed version of this show as part of the channel's 15th season.

== Critical reception ==
Mary McNamara of Los Angeles Times called Kung Fu Panda: Legends of Awesomeness "a show that won't drive every adult in earshot absolutely crazy. And these days, that's saying something." Kevin McFarland of The A.V. Club said that the show "rips out the elements that made the original film such a surprise, leaving behind a derivative, cliché-laden children's show that recycles moral platitudes adequately but is otherwise indistinguishable from countless other programs" and "isn't a show that's aiming to be cutting edge or original, just mildly entertaining, which it is....This isn't going to harm any kids, but it's not going to impress them either." Despite the mixed reviews, the show has received four Emmy Awards and nominated for four Annie Awards.

== Awards and nominations ==
Year	Award	Category	Nominee	Result
2012	Annie Awards	Best Television Production Children		Nominated
2012	Annie Awards	Character Animation in a Television Production	Michael Franceschi	Nominated
2012	Annie Awards	Directing in a Television Production	Gabe Swarr	Nominated
2012	Annie Awards	Editing in a Television Production	Hugo Morales, Davrick Waltjen, Adam Arnold, Otto Ferrene	Nominated
2012	Kids' Choice Awards	Favorite Cartoon		Nominated
2012	Daytime Emmy Awards			
2012	Daytime Emmy Awards	Outstanding Sound Editing – Animation	Joe Pizzulo, Paulette Lifton, James Lifton, Benjamin Wynn, Jeremy Zuckerman, Rob McIntryre, Anna Adams, Jason Stiff, Molly Minus, Matt Hall, Andrew Ing, Roberto Dominguez Alegria, Aran Tanchum, Chris Gresham and Lawrence Reyes	Won
2012	Daytime Emmy Awards	Outstanding Sound Mixing – Animation	Justin Brinsfield, Matt Corey and Thomas J. Maydeck	Won
2012	Daytime Emmy Awards	Outstanding Casting for an Animated Series or Special	Sarah Noonan and Meredith Layne	Won
2012	Daytime Emmy Awards	Outstanding Individual in Animation	Joel Fajnor	Won
2012	British Academy Children's Awards	International	Peter Hastings, Gabe Swarr, Randy Doormans	Nominated
2013	Annie Awards	Storyboarding in an Animated Television or other Broadcast Venue Production	Ryan Kramer, Paul Linsley, Kenji Ono, Le Tang, Alice Herring, Mike Mullen, Aaron Hammersley (for "Enter the Dragon")	Nominated
2013	Annie Awards	Writing in an Animated Television or other Broadcast Venue Production	Doug Langdale (for "Kung Fu Day Care")	Nominated
2013	Annie Awards	Editorial in an Animated Television or other Broadcast Venue Production	Hugo Morales, Adam Arnold, Davrick Waltjen, Otto Ferrene (for "Monkey in the Middle")	Nominated
2013	Annie Awards	Editorial in an Animated Television or other Broadcast Venue Production	Hugo Morales, Adam Arnold, Davrick Waltjen, Otto Ferrene (for "Enter the Dragon")	Won
2013	Daytime Emmy Awards	Outstanding Children's Animated Program	Peter Hastings, Bret Haaland, Randy Dormans, Gabe Swarr, Andrew Huebner	Won
2013	Daytime Emmy Awards	Outstanding Directing in an Animated Program	Gabe Swarr, Michael Mullen, Lane Lueras, Juan Meza-Leon, Peter Hastings	Nominated
2013	Daytime Emmy Awards	Outstanding Individual in Animation	Joel Fajnor (for "Kung Fu Day Care")	Won
2013	Daytime Emmy Awards	Outstanding Individual in Animation	Bill Dely (for "Kung Shoes")	Won
2013	Daytime Emmy Awards	Outstanding Writing in Animation	Peter Hastings, Doug Langdale, Gene Grillo, Paul Rugg, Kevin Seccia, Scot Kreamer	Nominated
2013	Daytime Emmy Awards	Outstanding Sound Editing – Animation	Joe Pizzulo, Gary Falcone, Jeremy Zuckerman, Benjamin Wynn, Rob McIntyre, Anna Adams, Marc Schmidt, Andrew Ing, Jeseey Drake, Roberto Dominguez Alegira, Cynthia Merrill	Nominated
2013	Daytime Emmy Awards	Outstanding Sound Mixing – Animation	Justin Brinsfield, Thomas J Maydeck, Rob McIntyre	Nominated
2013	Primetime Emmy Awards	Outstanding Animated Program	For episode: "Enter The Dragon"	Nominated
2013	British Academy Children's Awards	International	Kung Fu Panda: Legends of Awesomeness	Nominated
2014	Annie Awards	Best Animated TV/Broadcast Production For Children's Audience		Nominated
2014	Annie Awards	Writing in an Animated TV/Broadcast Production	Katie Matila	Nominated
2014	Annie Awards	Editorial in an Animated TV/Broadcast Production	Adam Arnold, Hugo Morales, Davrick Waltjen	Nominated
2014	Daytime Emmy Award	Outstanding Children's Animated Program	Peter Hastings, Bret Haaland, Randy Dormans, Gabe Swarr, Joann Estoesta and Andrew Huebner	Won
2014	Daytime Emmy Award	Outstanding Writing in an Animated Program	Gene Grillo, Peter Hastings, Scott Kreamer, Doug Langdale and Paul Rugg	Nominated
2014	Daytime Emmy Award	Outstanding Directing in an Animated Program	Aaron Hammersley, Lane Lueras, Michael Mullen and Peter Hastings	Nominated
2014	Daytime Emmy Award	Outstanding Sound Mixing – Animation	Justin Brinsfield, Matt Corey, Thomas J. Maydeck and Rob McIntyre	Won
2014	Daytime Emmy Award	Outstanding Sound Editing – Animation	Gary Falcone, Jeremy Zuckerman, Benjamin Wynn, Jessey Drake, Andrew Ing, Anna Adams, Roberto Alegria, Cynthia Merrill, Rob McIntyre and Marc Schmidt	Nominated
2015	Daytime Emmy Award	Outstanding Sound Editing – Animation	Gary Falcone, Rob McIntyre, Marc Schmidt, Jeremy Zuckerman, Benjamin Wynn, Anna Adams, Andrew Ing, Thomas J. Maydeck, Roberto Dominguez Alegria and Cynthia Merrill	Won
2015	Daytime Emmy Award	Outstanding Sound Mixing – Animation	Justin Brinsfield, Matt Corey, Thomas J. Maydeck, Rob McIntyre and Roberto Dominguez Alegria	Won

== Home media ==
Kung Fu Panda: Legends of Awesomeness home video releases
Season		Episodes	Release dates
Season		Episodes	Region 1
1	2011–12	15 (of 26)	Kung Fu Panda 2: December 13, 2011; Episode(s): "Has-Been Hero" Good Croc, Bad Croc: June 18, 2013; Episode(s): "The Princess and the Po" • "Chain Reaction" • "Good Croc, Bad Croc" • "Jailhouse Panda" • "Bad Po" • "Po Fans Out" • "Father Crime" The Scorpion Sting: October 15, 2013; Episode(s): "Scorpion's Sting" • "Owl Be Back" • "Love Stings" • "Monkey in the Middle" The Midnight Stranger: March 11, 2014; Episode(s): "Master Ping" Holiday Hijinks: November 18, 2014 (Redbox exclusive); Episode(s): "Hometown Hero" • "Hall of Lame"
2	2012–13	10 (of 26)	The Scorpion Sting: October 15, 2013; Episode(s): "Kung Shoes" • "Crane On A Wire" • "Qilin Time" The Midnight Stranger: March 11, 2014; Episode(s): "Shifu's Back" • "Terror Cotta" • "The Midnight Stranger" • "Shoot the Messenger" • "Secret Admirer" • "Huge" Holiday Hijinks: November 18, 2014 (Redbox exclusive); Episode(s): "Present Tense"
3	2013–16	2 (of 28)	Holiday Hijinks: November 18, 2014 (Redbox exclusive); Episode(s): "Shifu's Ex" • "Po Picks a Pocket"
