= Kung Fu Panda =

DreamWorks Animation media franchise

- Created by: Ethan Reiff; Cyrus Voris
- Developed by: Jonathan Aibel Glenn Berger
- Original work: Kung Fu Panda
- Owners: DreamWorks Animation (Universal Pictures (Note: Paramount Pictures distributed the first and second films, while 20th Century Fox distributed the third film as part of DreamWorks Animation's distribution deals with Paramount from 2006 to 2012, and Fox from 2013 to 2017. The distribution rights to future Kung Fu Panda movies would move to Universal Studios following its acquisition by NBCUniversal in 2016; the first to be distributed by the studio was Kung Fu Panda 4 (2024).))
- Years: 2008–present

Films and television
- Films: Kung Fu Panda (2008); Kung Fu Panda 2 (2011); Kung Fu Panda 3 (2016); Kung Fu Panda 4 (2024)
- Short films: Secrets of the Furious Five (2008); Kung Fu Panda Holiday (2010); Kung Fu Panda: Secrets of the Masters (2011); Kung Fu Panda: Secrets of the Scroll (2016); Panda Paws (2016); Dueling Dumplings (2024)
- Animated series: Legends of Awesomeness (2011–2016); The Paws of Destiny (2018–2019); The Dragon Knight (2022–2023)

Theatrical presentations
- Play: Kung Fu Panda: Arena Spectacular

Games
- Video games: List of video games

Audio
- Soundtracks: Kung Fu Panda; Kung Fu Panda 2 Kung Fu Panda 3 Kung Fu Panda 4

Official website
- www.dreamworks.com/kungfupanda/

Kung Fu Panda is an American media franchise made by DreamWorks Animation. Beginning with the 2008 film Kung Fu Panda, it follows the titular Po Ping (primarily voiced by Jack Black and Mick Wingert), a bumbling, gluttonous giant panda who is improbably chosen as the prophesied Dragon Warrior and becomes a master of kung fu. The franchise is set in a fantasy wuxia genre version of ancient China populated by anthropomorphic animals. Although everyone initially doubts him, including Po himself, he proves himself worthy as he strives to fulfill his destiny and save China from evil forces.

The franchise consists mainly of four animated films: Kung Fu Panda (2008), Kung Fu Panda 2 (2011), Kung Fu Panda 3 (2016) and Kung Fu Panda 4 (2024), as well as three television series: Kung Fu Panda: Legends of Awesomeness (2011–2016), The Paws of Destiny (2018–2019), and The Dragon Knight (2022–2023). The first two films were distributed by Paramount Pictures, the third film was distributed by 20th Century Fox and the fourth was distributed by Universal Pictures, while the television series respectively aired on Nickelodeon and Nicktoons, Amazon Prime, and Netflix. Six short films: Secrets of the Furious Five (2008), Kung Fu Panda Holiday (2010), Kung Fu Panda: Secrets of the Masters (2011), Kung Fu Panda: Secrets of the Scroll, Panda Paws (both 2016), and Dueling Dumplings (2024), have also been produced.

The franchise's first two features were nominated for the Academy Award for Best Animated Feature as well as numerous Annie Awards, the first television series won 11 Emmy Awards and the third television series won two Emmy Awards. All four films were critical and commercial successes, grossing over $2 billion overall, making it the tenth highest-grossing animated film franchise, while the second film was the highest-grossing film worldwide directed solely by a woman (Jennifer Yuh Nelson) until Wonder Woman (2017). The series is additionally popular in China as an outstanding Western interpretation of the wuxia film genre.

== Films ==
Film	U.S. release date	Director(s)	Screenwriter(s)	Story by	Producer(s)
Kung Fu Panda	June 6, 2008	John Stevenson and Mark Osborne	Jonathan Aibel and Glenn Berger	Ethan Reiff and Cyrus Voris	Melissa Cobb
Kung Fu Panda 2	May 26, 2011	Jennifer Yuh Nelson	Jonathan Aibel and Glenn Berger	Jonathan Aibel and Glenn Berger	Melissa Cobb
Kung Fu Panda 3	January 29, 2016	Jennifer Yuh Nelson and Alessandro Carloni	Jonathan Aibel and Glenn Berger	Jonathan Aibel and Glenn Berger	Melissa Cobb
Kung Fu Panda 4	March 8, 2024	Mike Mitchell	Jonathan Aibel, Glenn Berger and Darren Lemke	Jonathan Aibel, Glenn Berger and Darren Lemke	Rebecca Huntley

Kung Fu Panda story chronology
- Kung Fu Panda (2008)
- Secrets of the Furious Five (2008)
- Kung Fu Panda Holiday (2010)
- Kung Fu Panda: Legends of Awesomeness (2011–2016)
- Kung Fu Panda 2 (2011)
- Secrets of the Masters (2011)
- Secrets of the Scroll (2016)
- Kung Fu Panda 3 (2016)
- Panda Paws (2016)
- The Paws of Destiny (2018–2019)
- Kung Fu Panda: The Dragon Knight (2022–2023)
- Kung Fu Panda 4 (2024)
- Dueling Dumplings (2024)

=== Kung Fu Panda (2008) ===
Po, a clumsy panda bear, is a kung fu fanatic who lives in the Valley of Peace and works in his goose father Mr. Ping's noodle shop, unable to realize his dream of learning the art of kung fu. One day, a kung fu tournament is held for the elderly spiritual leader of the valley, Grand Master Oogway, to determine the identity of the Dragon Warrior, the one kung fu master capable of understanding the secret of the Dragon Scroll, which is said to contain the key to limitless power. Everyone in the valley expects the Dragon Warrior to be one of the Furious Five—Tigress, Monkey, Mantis, Viper, and Crane—a quintet of kung fu warriors trained by Master Shifu to protect the valley. To everyone's surprise, Oogway chooses Po, who has accidentally stumbled into the tournament arena after arriving late via fireworks explosion.

Refusing to believe that Po can be the Dragon Warrior, Shifu subjects Po to torturous training exercises in order to discourage him into quitting. Determined to change himself into someone he can respect, Po perseveres in his training and befriends the Furious Five, who had previously mocked Po for his lack of skill in kung fu. Po soon learns that the valley is being approached by Tai Lung, an evil kung fu warrior who has escaped from prison to take revenge for being denied the Dragon Scroll, and despairs he will be unable to defeat him. However, Shifu discovers that Po is capable of martial arts when motivated by food, and successfully trains him to learn kung fu. After his training is complete, Po is given the Dragon Scroll, which he discovers to be blank. However, Po realizes that the key to limitless power lies within himself, allowing him to defeat Tai Lung and restore peace to the valley.

=== Kung Fu Panda 2 (2011) ===
Po now lives his dream as a kung fu master and protects the Valley of Peace alongside the Furious Five. However, he is thrown into internal conflict when he begins having flashbacks of his mother and learns from Mr. Ping that he was adopted as an infant. Shortly after, Po and the Five are sent on a mission to stop the evil peacock Lord Shen from using a newly developed weapon, the cannon, to conquer all of China and destroy kung fu tradition. Po remains tormented by thoughts of being abandoned by his real parents until he is guided by a wise old soothsayer to embrace his past, and remembers that his parents risked their lives to save him from Shen, who had set out to exterminate all pandas after learning of a prophecy that he would be defeated by "a warrior of black-and-white". Po achieves inner peace, which allows him to destroy Shen's new weapon, defeat Shen, and accept Mr. Ping as his father. However, the last scene of the movie shows Po's biological father realizing his son is alive.

=== Kung Fu Panda 3 (2016) ===
Shortly after the events of the second film, Shifu relinquishes his duties as master of the Jade Palace to Po, claiming that the next step of his own apprenticeship is to oversee the Furious Five's training. While struggling with this new responsibility, Po rejoices upon reuniting with his biological father, Li, though Mr. Ping is less enthusiastic. However, news arrives that the spirit warrior General Kai has returned to the mortal realm and is 'collecting' Kung Fu masters from all over China, both living and dead, to serve in his army of Jade Zombies. Po and the others discover from a scroll left by Oogway that Kai can only be defeated by the power of Chi, a technique known only by the panda colonies; thus, Po and Li set to the secret Panda Valley in order to have Po learn it. Po eventually discovers, to his horror, that Li had deceived him, because the pandas have long forgotten about how to manipulate the Chi, and he just wanted to protect his son from Kai. Once making amends with both his adoptive and biological fathers, Po joins forces with Ping, Tigress, and the pandas to make a stand against Kai, all mastering the power of Chi in the process and using its power to destroy him for good. After returning to the Valley of Peace, Po spends his days spreading the teachings of Kung fu and Chi.

=== Kung Fu Panda 4 (2024) ===
Shifu tasks Po to retire as the Dragon Warrior and find a successor as he must advance to become the Spiritual Leader of the Valley of Peace. Disappointed, he struggles to find the right candidate, angering Shifu. He later spots a corsac fox and thief named Zhen entering the Jade Palace and sends her to prison but soon learns that Tai Lung has returned. Zhen reveals that it wasn't actually Tai Lung but a shapeshifting sorceress named The Chameleon. Po decides to go after her and Zhen agrees to lead him to the Chameleon in exchange for a reduction of her sentence. They both head towards Juniper City and there, Po finds that Zhen is a wanted criminal, leading to both of them getting arrested. They successfully escape to the Den of Thieves where Zhen reunites with her old mentor Han who allows them to stay there for one day. Po and Zhen then enter Chameleon's lair, where Zhen betrays Po, takes the Staff of Wisdom and gives it to the Chameleon, who is revealed to be her master. Po manages to escape without the staff but Chameleon, who has shapeshifted into Zhen, throws him off of the cliff and Po gets saved by his adoptive and biological father. The Chameleon uses the staff to summon every martial arts master from the Spirit Realm, stealing their kung fu abilities and locking them in cages. Zhen decides to defect away from Chameleon and reunites with Po. Zhen later manages to convince the Den of Thieves to help her out in saving Po. Zhen and Po defeat the Chameleon and return the stolen Kung fu to their masters. Po sends them back to the spirit realm with Tai Lung taking the Chameleon with him. At the Valley of Peace, Po chooses Zhen as the next Dragon Warrior and the Furious Five joins him in training her.

== Television series ==
Series	Season	Episodes		Originally released		
Series	Season	Episodes		First released	Last released	Network
Kung Fu Panda Holiday	Special			November 24, 2010		NBC
Legends of Awesomeness	1	26		September 19, 2011	April 5, 2012	Nickelodeon
Legends of Awesomeness	2	26		April 6, 2012	June 21, 2013	Nickelodeon
Legends of Awesomeness	3	28	18	June 24, 2013	June 22, 2014	Nickelodeon
Legends of Awesomeness	3	28	10	February 15, 2016	June 29, 2016	Nicktoons
The Paws of Destiny	1	26	13	November 16, 2018		Amazon Prime Video
The Paws of Destiny	1	26	13	July 4, 2019		Amazon Prime Video
The Dragon Knight	1	11		July 14, 2022		Netflix
The Dragon Knight	2	12		January 12, 2023		Netflix
The Dragon Knight	3	19		September 7, 2023		Netflix

=== Kung Fu Panda: Legends of Awesomeness (2011–2014; 2016) ===
Kung Fu Panda: Legends of Awesomeness is an animated television series based on the Kung Fu Panda film series, set between the first two films. The show was originally intended to premiere in 2010, but was delayed and officially launched on Nickelodeon on November 7, 2011. Of the series's voice cast, only Lucy Liu, Randall Duk Kim, and James Hong reprise their roles from the films as Viper, Oogway, and Mr. Ping, respectively. The first season, consisting of 26 episodes, ended on April 5, 2012. The second season aired from April 6, 2012, to June 21, 2013, and also consisted of 26 episodes. A third season consisting of 28 episodes began airing June 24, 2013, going on an extended hiatus after June 22, 2014, before airing its last 10 episodes two years later, from February 15 to June 29, 2016, as a tie-in to the theatrical run of Kung Fu Panda 3.

=== Kung Fu Panda: The Paws of Destiny (2018–2019) ===
Kung Fu Panda: The Paws of Destiny is the second Kung Fu Panda animated series, set after the events of Kung Fu Panda 3. Across 26 episodes produced by DreamWorks Animation Television with Amazon Studios and ordered, and aired by Amazon Prime Video, the series was released in its 13-episode first season's first part on November 16, 2018, and its 13-episode first season's second and final part on July 4, 2019. The series follows Po on a fresh adventure, mentoring four young pandas (Nu Hai, Jing, Bao and Fan Tong), who happen upon a mystical cave beneath the Panda Village - and accidentally absorb the chi of the ancient and powerful Kung Fu warriors known as the four constellations. The four friends realize that they now have a new destiny - to save the world from an impending evil with their new-found Kung Fu powers. They are aided along their journey by Po, who finds himself faced with his biggest challenge yet - teaching this ragtag band of kids how to wield their strange powers.

=== Kung Fu Panda: The Dragon Knight (2022–2023) ===
Kung Fu Panda: The Dragon Knight is the third Kung Fu Panda animated series, which premiered on Netflix on July 14, 2022, with Jack Black reprising his role as Po. The series follows Po as he must leave his home behind and embark on a globe-trotting quest for redemption and justice that finds him partnered up with a no-nonsense English knight known as the Wandering Blade. Rita Ora joined the cast as Wandering Blade and James Hong reprised his role as Mr. Ping.

== Short films ==
=== Kung Fu Panda: Secrets of the Furious Five (2008) ===
Kung Fu Panda: Secrets of the Furious Five, or simply Secrets of the Furious Five, is an animated short film that serves as a semi-sequel (or spin-off) to Kung Fu Panda and appears on a companion disc of the original film's deluxe DVD release. It was later broadcast on NBC on February 26, 2009, and is available as a separate DVD as of March 24 the same year. The film has a framing story of Po (in computer animation), telling the stories of his comrades in arms, the Furious Five, which are depicted in 2D cel animation.

=== Kung Fu Panda Holiday (2010) ===
Kung Fu Panda Holiday (also known as Kung Fu Panda Holiday Special) is a 2010 television short film that premiered on NBC on November 24, 2010. It tells a story of Po, who is assigned to host the annual Winter Feast by Master Shifu, despite his wishes to spend the holiday with Mr. Ping.

=== Kung Fu Panda: Secrets of the Masters (2011) ===
Kung Fu Panda: Secrets of the Masters is an animated short film released on December 13, 2011, as a special feature attached to the Kung Fu Panda 2 DVD and Blu-ray. It tells the backgrounds of the masters of Gongmen City: Thundering Rhino, Storming Ox, and Croc.

=== Kung Fu Panda: Secrets of the Scroll (2016) ===
Kung Fu Panda: Secrets of the Scroll is an animated short film officially released as a bonus feature in the Kung Fu Panda: Ultimate Edition of Awesomeness Blu-ray pack in January 2016. Secrets of the Scroll details the forming of the Furious Five, and their first fight together against a common enemy.

=== Panda Paws (2016) ===
Panda Paws is a short film that was released with the home media of Kung Fu Panda 3. Panda Paws involves the character Mei Mei (voiced by Kate Hudson) competing with Bao at the "Spring Festival". A version of the short was previously released in theaters preceding the DreamWorks Animation film Home in 2015, with Rebel Wilson voicing Mei Mei, prior to her firing from Kung Fu Panda 3.

=== Dueling Dumplings (2024) ===
Dueling Dumplings is a short film that was released with the home media of Kung Fu Panda 4, taking place after the events of the movie. It involves Po and Zhen offering each other dumplings from their respective homelands. They bicker over whose are better and try to force each other to try them. After a playful battle, they end up tasting each other's dumplings and end up liking them.

== Cast and characters ==
List indicators

This section includes characters who will appear or have appeared in the franchise.

- An empty grey cell indicates the character was not in the film, or that the character's official presence has not yet been confirmed.
- ^{C} indicates a cameo role.
- ^{Y} indicates a younger version of the character.

Character	Films				Short films					Television special	Television series		
Character	Kung Fu Panda (2008)	Kung Fu Panda 2 (2011)	Kung Fu Panda 3 (2016)	Kung Fu Panda 4 (2024)	Secrets of the Furious Five (2008)	Kung Fu Panda: Secrets of the Masters (2011)	Kung Fu Panda: Secrets Of the Scroll (2016)	Panda Paws (2016)	Dueling Dumplings (2024)	Kung Fu Panda Holiday (2010)	Kung Fu Panda: Legends of Awesomeness (2011–2016)	Kung Fu Panda: The Paws of Destiny (2018–2019)	Kung Fu Panda: The Dragon Knight (2022–2023)
=== Introduced in Kung Fu Panda ===
Po Ping Li Lotus	Jack Black	Jack Black Liam Knight^{Y}	Jack Black	Jack Black	Jack Black	Jack Black	Jack Black		Jack Black	Jack Black	Mick Wingert	Mick Wingert	Jack Black
Master Shifu	Dustin Hoffman	Dustin Hoffman	Dustin Hoffman	Dustin Hoffman	Dustin Hoffman	Dustin Hoffman	Dustin Hoffman			Dustin Hoffman	Fred Tatasciore		
Tigress	Angelina Jolie	Angelina Jolie	Angelina Jolie	Silent cameo	Tara Strong	Angelina Jolie	Kari Wahlgren Tara Marci^{Y}			Angelina Jolie	Kari Wahlgren	Action figure	
Mantis	Seth Rogen	Seth Rogen	Seth Rogen	Seth Rogen^{C}	Max Koch	Seth Rogen	Seth Rogen			Seth Rogen	Max Koch	Flashback cameo	
Monkey	Jackie Chan	Jackie Chan	Jackie Chan	Silent cameo	Jaycee Chan		James Sie			Jackie Chan	James Sie	Flashback cameo	
Viper	Lucy Liu	Lucy Liu	Lucy Liu	Silent cameo	Jessica DiCicco		Lucy Liu			Lucy Liu	Lucy Liu	Flashback cameo	
Crane	David Cross	David Cross	David Cross	Silent cameo	David Cross		David Cross			David Cross	Amir Talai	Flashback cameo	
Mr. Ping	James Hong	James Hong	James Hong	James Hong			James Hong			James Hong	James Hong	James Hong	James Hong
Oogway	Randall Duk Kim	Silent cameo	Randall Duk Kim	Statue	Randall Duk Kim	Randall Duk Kim	Randall Duk Kim				Randall Duk Kim	Piotr Michael	
Tai Lung	Ian McShane Riley Osborne^{Y}	Archive footage	Silent cameo	Ian McShane						Character is mute	André Sogliuzzo		Silent cameo
Zeng	Dan Fogler									Dan Fogler	Mick Wingert		
Commander Vachir	Michael Clarke Duncan												
=== Introduced in Kung Fu Panda 2 ===
Lord Shen		Gary Oldman	Archive footage	Silent role									Silent cameo
Soothsayer		Michelle Yeoh											
Wolf Boss		Danny McBride											
Storming Ox		Dennis Haysbert				Dennis Haysbert							
Croc		Jean-Claude Van Damme	Jean-Claude Van Damme			Tony Leondis							
Thundering Rhino		Victor Garber				Paul Scheer				Jonathan Groff			
Li Shan		Fred Tatasciore^{C}	Bryan Cranston	Bryan Cranston								Christopher Swindle	
=== Introduced in Kung Fu Panda 3 ===
General Kai			J. K. Simmons	Silent role									Silent cameo
Mei Mei			Kate Hudson					Kate Hudson Rebel Wilson				Chrissy Metz	
Master Bear			Fred Tatasciore										
Master Chicken			Stephen Kearin										
Bao Black Tortoise			Steele Gangon					Steele Gangon				Gunnar Sizemore	
Lei Lei			Liam Knight										
Grandma Panda			Barbara Dirickson					Barbara Dirickson				Amy Hill	
Sum			Al Roker										
Dim			Willie Geist										
Big Fun			Wayne Knight										
Hom-Lee			Wayne Knight										
=== Introduced in Kung Fu Panda 4 ===
Zhen				Awkwafina					Awkwafina				
The Chameleon				Viola Davis									
Han				Ke Huy Quan									
Granny Boar				Lori Tan Chinn									
Captain Fish				Ronny Chieng									
=== Introduced in Kung Fu Panda Holiday ===
Wo Hop										Jack McBrayer			
=== Introduced in Kung Fu Panda shorts ===
Viper's Dad					James Sie		James Sie						
Viper's Mom					Meredith Scott Lynn								
Mei Ling					Stephanie Lemelin								
Wu Sisters						Sumalee Montano							
=== Introduced in Kung Fu Panda: Legends of Awesomeness ===
Fung											John DiMaggio		
Hundun											Diedrich Bader		
Taotie											Wallace Shawn		
Bian Zao											Simon Helberg		
Fenghuang											Wendie Malick		
Junjie											Stephen Root		
Temutai											Kevin Michael Richardson		
Bao											Fred Tatasciore		
Peng											Danny Cooksey		
Chao											James Sie		
Jong Sung Jai Kai Chow											Wayne Knight		
Scorpion											Lynn Milgrim		
Lidong											Jim Cummings		
Hu											Neil Ross		
Ke-Pa											Alfred Molina		
=== Introduced in Kung Fu Panda: Paws of Destiny ===
Nu Hai Blue Dragon												Haley Tju	
Jing White Tiger												Laya Deleon Hayes	
Fan Tong Red Phoenix												Makana Say	
Jade Tusk												Cherise Boothe	
Rooster												Michael Rivkin	
Jindiao												Steve Blum	
Yaoguai Demon												Mitch Watson	
Princess Xiao												Lacey Chabert	
Shi Long												Sumalee Montano	
White Bone Demon												Elisa Gabrielli	
Sun Wukong												James Sie	
=== Introduced in Kung Fu Panda The Dragon Knight ===
Wandering Blade													Rita Ora
Klaus													Chris Geere
Veruca													Della Saba
Rukhmini													Rahnuma Panthaky
Akna													Melissa Villaseñor
Colin													Ed Weeks
Forouzan													Shohreh Aghdashloo
Zhen													Stephanie Hsu
Rabia													Kinza Khan
Lao													James Sie
Chuntao													Tru Valentino
Weimin													Parry Shen
Diya													Deepti Gupta
Padma													Anjali Bhimani
Jayesh													Sean T. Krishnan
Pelpel													Harvey Guillén
B'ah													Jorge Diaz
Queen Zuma													Sarah-Nicole Robles
Kyle													Richard Ayoade
Master Mastodon													Martin Aistrope
Nian													James Sie
Changpu													Dayci Brookshire
High Priestess													Rolonda Watts
Shoddy Boat Owner													Nolan North
The Queen of England													Barbara Goodson
Drake													Mick Wingert
Edgar													Billy Boyd
Duncan													Nicholas Guy Smith
Benny													Keith Ferguson
Lucinda													Toks Olagundoye
Kemanzi													Kineta Kunutu
Sir Alfred													Omid Abtahi
Master Sloth													Sean Astin
Master Longtooth													Kineta Kunutu
Master Ostrich													Kenna Ramsey

== Additional crew ==
Role	Film			
Role	Kung Fu Panda	Kung Fu Panda 2	Kung Fu Panda 3	Kung Fu Panda 4
Co-director	—N/a	—N/a	—N/a	Stephanie Ma Stine
Executive Producer(s)	Bill Damaschke	—N/a	Mike Mitchell; Guillermo del Toro; La Peikang; Li Ruigang	Mike Mitchell
Composers	Hans Zimmer & John Powell	Hans Zimmer & John Powell	Hans Zimmer	Hans Zimmer & Steve Mazzaro
Editor	Clare Knight	Clare Knight	Clare Knight	Christopher Knights
Animation Studio	DreamWorks Animation	DreamWorks Animation	DreamWorks Animation; Oriental DreamWorks	DreamWorks Animation
Distributor	Paramount Pictures	Paramount Pictures	20th Century Fox	Universal Pictures
Running time	91 min	90 min	95 min	94 min

== Reception ==
=== Box office performance ===
The film series has grossed over $2.3 billion, making it the eighth highest-grossing animated franchise and DreamWorks Animation's second highest-grossing franchise behind Shrek.

Film	Release date	Box office				Rank		Budget	Ref.
Film	Release date	Opening weekend North America	North America	Other territories	Worldwide	All time North America	All time worldwide	Budget	Ref.
Kung Fu Panda	June 6, 2008	$60,239,130	$215,771,591	$416,311,606	$632,083,197	#201	#167	$130 million	
Kung Fu Panda 2	May 26, 2011	$47,656,302	$165,249,063	$500,443,218	$665,692,281	#352	#154	$150 million	
Kung Fu Panda 3	January 29, 2016	$41,282,042	$143,528,619	$377,642,206	$521,170,825	#453	#235	$145 million	
Kung Fu Panda 4	March 8, 2024	$57,989,905	$193,590,620	$354,229,410	$547,820,030	#248	#216	$85 million	
Total		$207,167,379	$718,139,893	$1,648,626,440	$2,366,766,333			$510 million	

=== Critical and public reception ===
Each Kung Fu Panda film has received positive reviews, with critics often praising the animation, voice acting, and character development.

Critical and public response of Kung Fu Panda
Title	Critical		Public
Title	Rotten Tomatoes	Metacritic	CinemaScore
Kung Fu Panda	87% (189 reviews)	74 (36 reviews)	A−
Kung Fu Panda 2	82% (185 reviews)	67 (34 reviews)	A
Kung Fu Panda 3	87% (178 reviews)	66 (34 reviews)	A
Kung Fu Panda 4	71% (164 reviews)	54 (33 reviews)	A–

=== Awards ===
Award	Category	Kung Fu Panda	Kung Fu Panda 2	Kung Fu Panda 3
Academy Awards	Best Animated Feature	Nominated	Nominated	
Annie Awards	Best Animated Feature	Won	Nominated	Nominated

== Video games ==
- Kung Fu Panda is a video game loosely based on the first film. It was published released by Activision on June 3, 2008, for Microsoft Windows, PlayStation 2, PlayStation 3, Xbox 360, Wii, and Nintendo DS, and on March 18, 2009, for Mac OS X.
- Kung Fu Panda: Legendary Warriors is a sequel to the video game Kung Fu Panda. It was published by Activision on November 5 and December 5, 2008, for the Nintendo DS and Wii, respectively.
- Kung Fu Panda World was a browser game released on April 12, 2010.
- Kung Fu Panda 2 is a video game that takes place after the events of the second film. It was published by THQ on May 23, 2011, for PlayStation 3, Xbox 360, Wii, and Nintendo DS.
- Kung Fu Panda: Dojo Mojo is an arcade ticket redemption game developed by Innovative Concepts in Entertainment (ICE) and Play Mechanix and distributed by Sega Amusements internationally. The machine was revealed at IAAPA trade show in 2014 and was officially released for shipping in early 2015 (January 1, 2015). The design features 6 illuminated pads surrounding the player, instructing them to hit the pads in accordance to the targets on screen with 3 difficulty levels.
- Kung Fu Panda: Showdown of Legendary Legends is a video game developed by Vicious Cycle Software and published by Little Orbit. The game was released on December 1, 2015, for Microsoft Windows, Xbox 360, Xbox One, PlayStation 3, PlayStation 4, Wii U, and Nintendo 3DS.
- A crossover event between Brawlhalla and Kung Fu Panda was released as downloadable content on March 24, 2021, adding Po, Tigress, and Tai Lung to the game as playable characters.
- A crossover between Mobile Legends: Bang Bang and Kung Fu Panda was released as skins for Akai (Po), Ling (Lord Shen), and Thamuz (General Kai) on August 20, 2022.
- DreamWorks All-Star Kart Racing is a racing video game that was published by GameMill Entertainment, and includes Po, Tigress, Shifu, and Oogway (the latter being a DLC character from the Rally Pack) as playable racers. The video game was released on November 3, 2023, for Nintendo Switch, PlayStation 5, PlayStation 4, Microsoft Windows, Xbox Series X and Series S, and Xbox One.

== Arena show ==
Directed by entertainment director Franco Dragone, Kung Fu Panda: Arena Spectacular is an in-progress live arena show, featuring characters from the Kung Fu Panda. Combining circus and Chinese acrobatics as well as arena show effects, the production was supposed to be released around the same time of Kung Fu Panda 2. After a multi city casting tour in 2010, the production went behind closed doors until late 2011 when a new set of audition dates were announced for the following year. However, shortly before the announced January 2012 auditions, both Franco Dragone and DreamWorks decided to postpone the live show's opening date, canceling all auditions. No further announcements have been made since.

== Attractions ==
A themed area Po's Kung Fu Garden was opened in 2012 at DreamWorks Experience, one of the themed lands at the Australian theme park Dreamworld. At opening Po's Kung Fu Garden consisted only of a small area featuring a Po photo opportunity. In late 2012, additional rides and attractions were added to the area. All of the rides were moved to Ocean Parade since DreamWorks Experience was rethemed as Kenny and Belinda's Dreamland in 2023.

A multi-sensory attraction, based on Kung Fu Panda, opened at the DreamWorks Theatre on June 15, 2018, at Universal Studios Hollywood.

A Kung Fu Panda-themed children's play area opened at DreamWorks Water Park on October 1, 2020.

Universal Studios Beijing also has a Kung Fu Panda themed area titled Kung Fu Panda Land of Awesomeness, which opened alongside the park in September 2021.

Universal Studios Florida's DreamWorks Land includes the play area "Po's Kung Fu Training Camp" and the digital meet-and-greet titled "Po Live!".
