= Kung Fu Panda: Legends of Awesomeness season 3 =

Kung Fu Panda: Legends of Awesomeness
- Season 3
- No. of episodes: 28

Release
- Original network: Nickelodeon (2013–14); Nicktoons (2016)
- Original release: June 24, 2013 – June 29, 2016

Season chronology
- ← Previous; Season 2

This is a list of episodes for the third and final season of Nickelodeon's animated television series, Kung Fu Panda: Legends of Awesomeness. Its first episode premiered on June 24, 2013, and its last episode premiered on June 29, 2016, in the United States. Prior to premiering in the United States, the final few episodes of the series were released in chronological order in Germany between December 30, 2014, and January 7, 2015. In the United States, the final few episodes did not premiere in chronological order.

== Episodes ==
No. overall	No. in season	Title	Directed by	Written by	Storyboarded by	Original release date	Prod. code	US viewers (millions)
Nickelodeon
53	1	"Shifu's Ex"	Aaron Hammersley	Gene Grillo	Paul Linsley and Ryan Kramer; Luther McLaurin, Julia "Fitzy" Fitzmaurice and Jean-Sebastien Duclos (additionals)	June 24, 2013	218	2.2
When Shifu's ex-girlfriend Mei Ling returns to the palace, Po tries to get them back together.: Villain: Mei Ling
54	2	"War of the Noodles"	Lane Lueras	Doug Langdale	Sean Petrilak and Mark Sperber; Julia "Fitzy" Fitzmaurice, Carrie Liao, Jean-Sebastien Duclos and Luther McLaurin (additionals)	June 25, 2013	305	1.9
Hundun opens up a noodle shop of his own, forming a rivalry between him and Mr. Ping.: Villains: Hundun and Hundun's Waiters
55	3	"The Break Up"	Lane Lueras	Katie Mattila	Luther McLaurin and Sean Petrilak; Luther McLaurin (additional)	June 26, 2013	208	2.0
Gah-ri quits Fung's gang and gets a new job at Ping's noodle shop, making Po jealous, so he teams up with Fung to try and break them up.: Villains: Fung & the Croc Bandits
56	4	"Mind Over Manners"	Aaron Hammersley	Kevin Campbell	Ryan Kramer and Kenji Ono; Carrie Liao, Jean-Sebastien Duclos and Luther McLaurin (additionals)	June 27, 2013	304	2.2
A powerful gem stolen by Tong Fo gives Po the ability to read minds after being struck by lightning, but it isn't long before this new power starts driving everyone else crazy.: Villain: Tong Fo
57	5	"A Thousand and Twenty Questions"	Lane Lueras	Brandon Sawyer	Mark Sperber and Sean Petrilak; Julia "Fitzy" Fitzmaurice, Carrie Liao, Luther McLaurin and Jean-Sebastien Duclos (additionals)	June 28, 2013	302	2.1
Master Yao returns and offers to share his knowledge with those who expose him to new marvels, but things get dangerous when Taotie asks him how to fix his latest super-weapon that will finally defeat Po and the Furious Five.: Villain: Taotie
58	6	"The Way of the Prawn"	Michael Mullen	Gene Grillo	Alice Herring and Paul Linsley; Luther McLaurin, Carrie Liao and Jean-Sebastien Duclos (additionals)	July 1, 2013	306	1.9
When a villainous clam from Japan deals Po a humiliating defeat, a samurai prawn arrives to help fight him, whom Po doesn't get along with.: Villain: Kira
59	7	"Mouth Off"	Aaron Hammersley	Doug Langdale	Kenji Ono and Ryan Kramer; Luther McLaurin, Carrie Liao and Jean-Sebastien Duclos (additionals)	July 2, 2013	307	2.0
Shifu suggests that Po should take a vow of silence to help him focus, but he has problems keeping his mouth shut. So he uses Mantis' paralyzing moves to paralyze his vocal cords, which ends up causing trouble with Temutai's army.: Villains: Temutai and his sons Chulun and Bataar
60	8	"Serpent's Tooth"	Lane Lueras	Gene Grillo	Mark Sperber and Sean Petrilak; Julia "Fitzy" Fitzmaurice, Luther McLaurin, Carrie Liao and Jean-Sebastien Duclos (additionals)	July 3, 2013	308	1.6
A once hero renegade cobra with the powers of the Dragon gods: (Super Strength, Super Speed, Super Intelligence, Stamina, Durability, and a poison that brings out the greatest fears in the minds of its victims) named Fu-Xi loose in the valley causes the villagers to display a negative attitude towards snakes, causing Viper to consider joining him, although she later tricks him into revealing where his fear toxin is kept and almost defeats him. Viper and Po must stop Fu-Xi from transferring his toxic fear venom into the Valley of Peace's new water dam.: Villain: Fu-Xi
61	9	"The Goosefather"	Michael Mullen	Katie Mattila	Paul Linsley and Alice Herring; Luther McLaurin, Jean-Sebastien Duclos and Carrie Liao (additionals)	January 11, 2014	309	1.7
The local thugs love Mr. Ping's soup so much, the noodle shop becomes a villain hangout. When Tong Fo, the criminals' former boss, comes to Mr. Ping's Noodle Shop to offer him world domination will Ping decide if the thieves are more important than being good and honest or will Po have to fight his father, now a crime boss?: Villain: Tong Fo
62	10	"Po Picks a Pocket"	Lane Lueras	Gene Grillo	Sean Petrilak and Mark Sperber; Julia "Fitzy" Fitzmaurice, Luther McLaurin, Jean-Sebastien Duclos and Carrie Liao (additionals)	January 26, 2014	310	2.2
Po befriends a group of orphans who have been stealing money and goods from the villagers. Soon Po, Tigress, and Shifu discover they have been working for a clever pangolin named Sanzu who wants to use the children for his own purposes.: Villain: Sanzu
63	11	"Croc You Like A Hurricane"	Aaron Hammersley	Doug Langdale	Ryan Kramer and Kenji Ono; Luther McLaurin, Carrie Liao and Jean-Sebastien Duclos (additionals)	February 2, 2014	311	1.7
Shifu grows tired of Po complaining and puts him in charge of training the Furious Five. The situation becomes worse when Fung and the Croc Bandits train with a powerful kung fu master named Gia and learn invincible fighting moves that quickly overwhelm the Furious Five under Po's pathetic training. Po and the Five discover that the Emperor of China sent Master Gia to train Fung and the Crocs as their replacements! Are they fired, or can they get their jobs back without disobeying the Emperor's seal?: Villains: Fung & the Croc Bandits
64	12	"Crazy Little Ling Called Love"	Aaron Hammersley and Luther McLaurin	Doug Langdale	Natasha Wicke, Kenji Ono, Carrie Liao and Ryan Kramer; Luther McLaurin and Jean-Sebastien Duclos (additionals)	February 9, 2014	319	2.3
Po is suspicious when Shifu gets back together with his evil ex-girlfriend, Mei Ling. It turns out that Shifu's old enemy, Master Junjie, blackmailed Mei Ling into stealing a golden crown for him by saying if she doesn't Shifu will never be safe with her. Is Po's master going to go to jail for her or will Po stop Mei Ling and Junjie?: Villains: Junjie and Junjie's Furious Five
65	13	"Kung Fu Club"	Lane Lueras	Gene Grillo	Mark Sperber, Sean Petrilak and Luther McLaurin; Julia "Fitzy" Fitzmaurice and Jean-Sebastien Duclos (additionals)	February 16, 2014	314	2.3
Shifu sends Po to shut down an underground fight club, but Po disobeys and joins the club instead, only to find that Peng, Po's old friend, is the leader. Soon, Tong Fo tricks Peng into fighting Po through threatening his girlfriend.: Villain: Tong Fo
66	14	"The Hunger Game"	Michael Mullen	John P. McCann	Paul Linsley and Alice Herring; Jean-Sebastien Duclos and Luther McLaurin (additionals)	February 23, 2014	315	2.2
Po and the Furious Five must stop food-stealing rats to end a great famine, but will Po's weakness for food hinder the mission?: Villains: Ju-Long & the Lao Shu and Madame Zhou
67	15	"A Stitch in Time"	Aaron Hammersley and Luther Mclaurin	Doug Langdale	Ryan Kramer and Kenji Ono; Jean-Sebastien Duclos (additional)	March 2, 2014	316	2.1
Po discovers the seeds of the Shuyong, the Tree of Eternity that will exist before and after time whose seeds are magical items that can send the user back in time if the user destroys one of these seeds. Po disobeys Shifu and uses the seeds for his own selfish purposes until Fenghuang gets a hold of one of these seeds. Shifu tells Po and the Furious Five that if she plants the seed, a tree similar to the Shuyong will grow and if she eats that fruit, she will have complete mastery of time. Fenghuang alters time and erases everyone except for Po who grabs her so she can't get away. Sadly, he drops a bag of the seeds and they explode sending both of them back before the beginning of time to where the mystic Shuyong lives. Po restrains Fenghuang only to be faced by the three powerful guardians of the Shuyong. They defeat the guardians and Po asks the Tree for his magic fruit, but the Shuyong replies that if Po or Fenghuang prove themselves worthy shall have his fruit. In the end, Fenghuang is sent into oblivion and the Shuyong Tree restores Po back to the original time where he finds everyone restored and burns the seeds all except for one!: Villain: Fenghuang
68	16	"Eternal Chord"	Lane Lueras	Gene Grillo	Julia "Fitzy" Fitzmaurice, Sean Petrilak and Mark Sperber; Jean-Sebastien Duclos and Luther McLaurin (additionals)	June 8, 2014	317	2.0
Po's Chi needs to be reharmonized by means of musical kung fu, and time is of the essence, because Po must halt the Yaoguai, who are intent on stealing five musical instruments made by ancient masters in order to fight the evil ducks the instruments would play the Eternal Chord, (a harmonious song that transformed the earth from darkness and chaos to light and order) and then the wicked goose will use them to play a distorted, inharmonious song called the Anti-Eternal Chord which will destroy the world and un-create the universe.: Villains: Yaoguai Duck Twins
69	17	"Apocalypse Yao"	Michael Mullen	Doug Langdale	Alice Herring and Paul Linsley; Luther McLaurin, Jean-Sebastien Duclos and Mark Garcia (additionals)	June 15, 2014	318	N/A
Po must help Master Yao when Taotie and Bian Zao steal the secrets of kung fu from his mind while on their way to see a powerful master.: Villains: Taotie, Bian Zao, Temutai, Hundun, Fung & Gah-ri
70	18	"The Real Dragon Warrior"	Lane Lueras	Allan Rice	Mark Sperber and Sean Petrilak; Luther McLaurin, Jean-Sebastien Duclos, Julia "Fitzy" Fitzmaurice and Mark Garcia (additionals)	June 22, 2014	320	N/A
Po and Monkey discover a small village and meet an impostor claiming to be the Dragon Warrior.: Villain: Shi Wo's acting troupe
Nicktoons
71	19	"Youth in Re-Volt"	Aaron Hammersley	Doug Langdale	Carrie Liao and Kenji Ono; Luther McLaurin, Jean-Sebastien Duclos and Mark Garcia (additionals)	February 15, 2016 (Note: This episode first aired on December 30, 2014 in Germany. Also, beginning with this episode, new episodes in the United States premiered on Nicktoons instead of Nickelodeon.)	322	N/A
Bian Zao steals magical lightning powers and teams up with Tong Fo and the Croc Bandits; Po and Taotie must keep Bian Zao from destroying the village.: Villains: Taotie, Bian Zao, Fung & the Croc Bandits, Tong Fo
72	20	"Forsaken and Furious"	Lane Lueras	Gene Grillo	Sean Petrilak, Julia "Fitzy" Fitzmaurice, John Aoshima and Lane Lueras; Luther McLaurin and Mark Garcia (additionals)	February 16, 2016 (Note: This episode first aired on January 5, 2015 in Germany.)	326	N/A
The Furious Five grow tired of the villagers not respecting them, even their old enemy, Hundun, doesn't see them as a threat anymore, as Po gets all the credit, which has them believing him to be responsible for the loss of respect. However, after their master revealed a portrait of Po being lifted by the Five and witnessing his efforts in trying to cover up, the Five realized that Po had nothing to do with the loss of respect from the villagers as they realized that it is all Shifu's doing, which leads to an argument and the Five quitting the Jade Palace to strike out on their own. Meanwhile, Junjie allies himself with Hundun to take down Po and Shifu. After Po gets captured, Shifu goes to the Five for help as he admits his mistake and apologized to them as they worked together to stop their enemies. Through their victory, the villagers respect the Five again.: Villains: Junjie, Hundun
73	21	"Po the Croc"	Aaron Hammersley	Doug Langdale	Carrie Liao, Jean-Sebastien Duclos and Alice Herring; Luther McLaurin (additional)	February 17, 2016 (Note: This episode first aired on January 7, 2015 in Germany.)	328	0.31
When a blow to the head leaves Po with amnesia, Fung and the Croc Bandits convince him that he is their evil bandit leader. However, Fung realized that he went too far when Po proves himself to be a really bad and misguided leader. Through his action figures, Po gets his memory back but doesn't remember anything that happen during his amnesia. After those events, Fung and the Croc Bandits decide to go straight right after doing time in prison.: Villains: Fung & the Croc Bandits; Note: This episode takes place after the series finale.
74	22	"Camp Ping"	Michael Mullen	Gene Grillo	Paul Linsley and Alice Herring; Luther McLaurin, Jean-Sebastien Duclos and Mark Garcia (additionals)	February 18, 2016 (Note: This episode first aired on January 6, 2015 in Germany.)	327	0.32
Shifu and Mr. Ping compete for Po's attention while on a camping trip.: Villain: Kim the Invincible
75	23	"Goose Chase"	Michael Mullen	Doug Langdale	Alice Herring and Paul Linsley; Luther McLaurin, Jean-Sebastien Duclos and Mark Garcia (additionals)	February 19, 2016 (Note: This episode first aired on January 1, 2015 in Germany.)	324	0.30
After Zeng quits his job at the Jade Palace, Po tries to cheer up the weepy goose by telling him that he could be a kung fu master.: Villain: Temutai
76	24	"The First Five"	Michael Mullen	Gene Grillo	Paul Linsley and Alice Herring; Luther McLaurin, Jean-Sebastien Duclos and Mark Garcia (additionals)	June 8, 2016 (Note: This episode premiered in other countries before the United States. The release date for the first official broadcast of this episode is currently unknown. The earliest date is from 2014 in Germany.)	321	N/A
Po throws a birthday party for Shifu and invites the original First Furious Five to attend, except for Fenghuang.: Villain: The Spirit of Xi-an
77	25	"See No Weevil"	Lane Lueras	Gene Grillo	Mark Sperber, Sean Petrilak and Lane Lueras; Julia "Fitzy" Fitzmaurice, Luther McLaurin, Jean-Sebastien Duclos and Mark Garcia (additionals)	June 15, 2016 (Note: This episode first aired on December 31, 2014 in Germany.)	323	N/A
Po discovers that General Tsin's conspiracy theory about invading alien rice weevils is true.: Villains: Alien Rice Weevils
78	26	"Face Full of Fear"	Aaron Hammersley	Allan Rice	Kenji Ono, Carrie Liao and Aaron Hammersley; Luther McLaurin, Jean-Sebastien Duclos and Mark Garcia (additionals)	June 22, 2016 (Note: This episode first aired on January 2, 2015 in Germany.)	325	N/A
When Po's childhood bully comes to town, Po must confront his fears or risk losing his mojo.: Villain: Temutai
79	27	"Emperors Rule"	Michael Mullen	Doug Langdale	Alice Herring, Paul Linsley and Michael Mullen; Luther McLaurin, Jean-Sebastien Duclos and Carrie Liao (additionals)	June 29, 2016	312	N/A
80	28	"Emperors Rule"	Aaron Hammersley	Gene Grillo	Ryan Kramer, Kenji Ono, Aaron Hammersley and Natasha Wicke; Luther McLaurin, Carrie Liao and Jean-Sebastien Duclos (additionals)	June 29, 2016	313	N/A
Po becomes Head of Imperial Security when Lu Kang returns to the Valley of Peace as Emperor. When an evil menace rises, Po has to turn to some surprising allies to save the day.: Villain: Pang Bing

== DVD releases ==
Season	Episodes	Release dates
Season	Episodes	Region 1
3	2 (of 28)	Holiday Hijinks: November 18, 2014 (Redbox exclusive); Episodes: "Shifu's Ex" (53) and "Po Picks a Pocket" (62)
