= Andrew Huebner =

American television producer

- Education: Columbia College Chicago
- Occupation: Television producer
- Years active: 1999–present
- Notable work: Avatar: The Last Airbender; Ni Hao, Kai-Lan; Monsters vs Aliens; The Penguins of Madagascar; Kung Fu Panda: Legends of Awesomeness
- Title: Vice president of animation production, Nickelodeon
- Awards: Daytime Emmy Awards; Primetime Emmy Award

Andrew Huebner is an American television producer for Nickelodeon Animation Studios. In that capacity, he has received one Primetime Emmy Award and three Daytime Emmy Awards.

== Early life ==
Huebner attended Columbia College Chicago, graduating in 1998 with a MFA in traditional animation.

== Career ==
=== Film Roman ===
Huebner worked from 1999 to 2000 for Film Roman. While there, he was the production assistant for Andy Vs. The Real World (or The Big-Ass Viacom Lawsuit (2000) and The Golden Child (2001). He was also a production coordinator for Andy Gets A Promotion (2000).

=== Nickelodeon Animation Studios ===
Huebner started working for Nickelodeon Animation Studios in 2001. He served in various capacities, including production assistant, writer, line producer, animation producer, post-production coordinator, post-production supervisor, production manager, producer, and vice president of animation production. His work for Nickelodeon has included collaborative projects with Bill Oakley/Josh Weinstein Productions, DreamWorks Animation, DreamWorks Animation Television, Pinkfong, Snee-Oosh, and United Plankton Pictures.

In 2003 and 2004, he was a post-production supervisor and post-production coordinator for episodes of Dora the Explorer. He was the production manager for sixteen episodes of the show Avatar: The Last Airbender across three seasons, from 2005 to 2008. He also wrote the show's "magnum opus", the "Tale of Iroh" segment in the episode "The Tales of Ba Sing Se." Sifu Kisu, Avatar: The Last Airbender's martial arts consultant, said "The person that runs it, the guy that really held Avatar together, was a guy named Andrew Huebner. He was the production manager at the time and he went on to do several other really big projects."

In 2008, Huebner worked as a line producer for Destiny Schmestiny and an animation producer for the show Ni Hao, Kai-Lan. In 2010, he received a nomination for a Daytime Emmy Award for Outstanding Special Class Animated Program for his production work on the television series Ni Hao, Kai-Lan, along with Jeff DeGrandis, Mary Harrington, and Sascha Paladino.

His "big projects" for Nickelodeon included being a producer for several animated television shows: Kung Fu Panda: Legends of Awesomeness, Monsters vs Aliens, and The Penguins of Madagascar. Huebner was the producer of season three of The Penguins of Madagascar which won the Daytime Emmy Award for Outstanding Children's Animated Program in 2012. In 2012, The Penguins of Madagascar also received a Primetime Emmy Award for Outstanding Animated Program Huebner also produced Peep & The Big Wide World which aired on PBS and was also nominated for Daytime Emmy Award for Outstanding Children's Animated Program in 2012.

Huebner received his second Daytime Emmy Award in 2013 when Kung Fu Panda: Legends of Awesomeness won Outstanding Children's Animated Program; The Penguins of Madagascar was also nominated in 2013. Kung Fu Panda: Legends of Awesomeness also received a Primetime Emmy Award nomination for Outstanding Animated Program (for Programming Less Than One Hour) in 2013. He also produced three animated shorts for Nickelodeon that were released in 2013: Bug Salad, Earmouse and Bottle, and Woodstump!. Bug Salad was an official selection of the Annecy International Animation Film Festival in 2014.

In 2014, he received two more Daytime Emmy nominations when Kung Fu Panda: Legends of Awesomeness and Monsters vs Aliens were nominated for the Outstanding Children's Animated Program, with the former winning again. He produced Kung Fu Panda: Legends of Awesomeness from 2011 to 2016.

In 2016, Huebner became a vice president of series production for Nickelodeon. Projects that he has overseen in this capacity include Pig and a Blanket (2016), Slimelab (2016), Space Mission: Danger! (2016), The Super Dooper Studios (2016), Farkels (2017), Hey Arnold!: The Jungle Movie (2017), and Camp Weedonwantcha (2017). He also produced the animated short Don vs. Raph (2016), also known as Teenage Mutant Ninja Turtles: Don vs Raph, which premiered at San Diego Comic–Con following a panel celebration 25 years of cartoons on Nickelodeon.

In 2018, Huebner worked on five episodes of Bug Salad In 2019 through 2022, he worked on episodes of Baby Shark's Big Show!, The Casagrandes, Invader Zim, The Loud House, Rocko's Modern Life, and SpongeBob SquarePants.

== Awards ==
- 2012: Daytime Emmy Award for Outstanding Children's Animated Program — The Penguins of Madagascar
- 2012: Primetime Emmy Award for Outstanding Animated Program — The Penguins of Madagascar
- 2013: Daytime Emmy Award for Outstanding Children's Animated Program — Kung Fu Panda: Legends of Awesomeness
- 2014: Daytime Emmy Award for Outstanding Children's Animated Program — Kung Fu Panda: Legends of Awesomeness
