= Cartoon Saloon =

Irish animation studio

Coordinates: 52.653034°N 7.25584°W

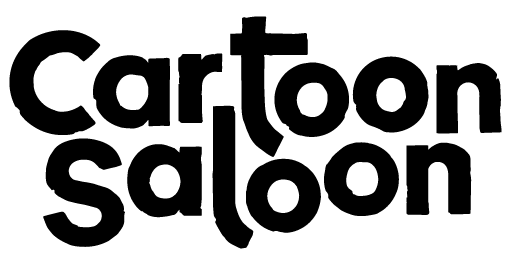
- Logo used since 2018

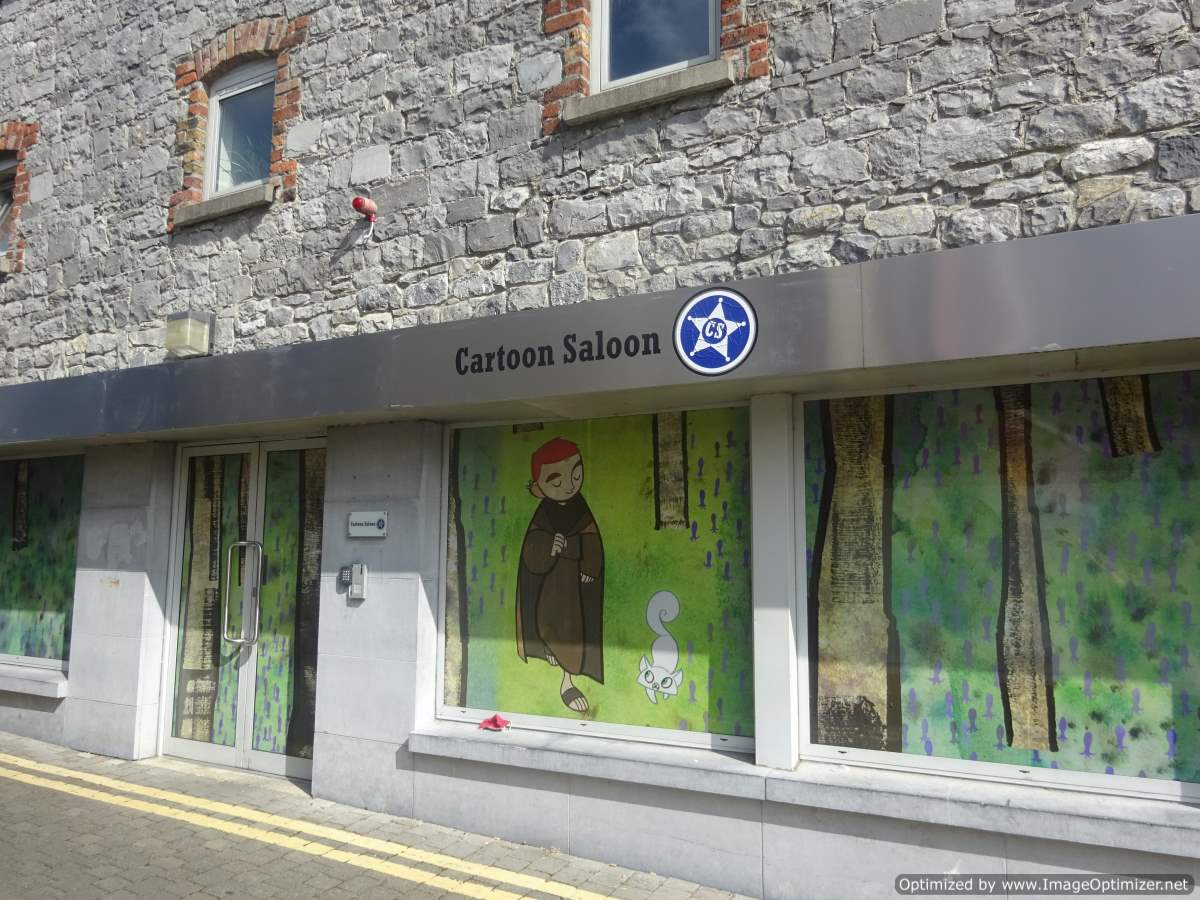
- Cartoon Saloon building in Kilkenny
- Type: Private
- Industry: Media; Entertainment
- Founded: 1999; 27 years ago
- Founder: Paul Young; Tomm Moore; Nora Twomey
- Headquarters: Kilkenny, Ireland
- Products: Animated feature films; TV series; Short films
- Number of employees: 300 (2020)
- Divisions: Lighthouse Studios (50% with Mercury Filmworks)
- Website: www.cartoonsaloon.ie

Cartoon Saloon is an Irish animation studio based in Kilkenny. The studio is best known for its animated feature films The Secret of Kells, Song of the Sea, The Breadwinner, and Wolfwalkers. Their works have received five Academy Award nominations, their first four feature length works all received nominations for Best Animated Feature and one for Best Animated Short Film (Late Afternoon). The company also developed the cartoon series Skunk Fu!, Puffin Rock, Dorg Van Dango and Vikingskool. As of 2020, the studio employs 300 animators.

== History ==
Cartoon Saloon was established in Kilkenny during 1999 by Tomm Moore, Nora Twomey, and Paul Young. The three were all alumni of the Ballyfermot College of Further Education’s animation degree course. Cartoon Saloon began working on a trailer for its first feature film, The Secret of Kells, that same year. However, the film did not enter full production until 2005; the company animated corporate work such as advertisements as they searched for funding. Meanwhile the studio of 12 animators relied on commercial and corporate work including web-site design and CD ROM production with Paul Young focusing on illustration whilst Tomm Moore undertook the animation.

Both The Secret of Kells and the studio’s second feature Song of the Sea were inspired by The Thief and the Cobbler and Mulan while the founders were in university. Tomm Moore, the director of both films, said "Some friends in college and I were inspired by Richard Williams' unfinished masterpiece The Thief and the Cobbler and the Disney movie Mulan, which took indigenous traditional art as the starting point for a beautiful style of 2D animation. I felt that something similar could be done with Irish art." A 2001 meeting with Les Armateurs proved instrumental in the effort to secure funding for The Secret of Kells, and the company helped in the production of the final film.

Logo used from 2008 to 2018

The success and Oscar nomination of the film in 2009 led to major offers for Cartoon Saloon, but the studio chose to remain independent. This led to a difficult time financially for the company for a few years with the partners having to take out personal loans to keep the studio afloat.

As of 2026, Cartoon Saloon is in production of its TV series, My Brother The Minotaur and two feature films.

== Services ==
The studio provides animation, illustration and design services for clients ranging from Disney to BBC to Cartoon Network.

Cartoon Saloon also provided the graphics for the successful Emperor of the Irish exhibition at Trinity College Dublin, in 2014.

== Filmography ==
=== Feature films ===
==== Released ====
Title	Release date	Budget	Gross	Rotten Tomatoes	Metacritic
The Secret of Kells (Note: Oscar nominee)	3 March 2009; 19 March 2010 (US)	$8 million	$3.5 million	90%	81
Song of the Sea	19 December 2014 (US); 10 July 2015 (UK & Ireland)	$7.5 million	$4.4 million	99%	85
The Breadwinner	17 November 2017 (US); 25 May 2018 (UK & Ireland)	$1 million	$4.4 million	95%	78
Wolfwalkers	30 October 2020 (UK Limited); 13 November 2020 (US Limited); 4 December 2020 (Ireland Limited); 11 December 2020 (Apple TV+)	€10 million	$1.3 million	99%	87
My Father's Dragon	4 November 2022 (UK US and Ireland Limited); 11 November 2022 (Netflix)	TBA	TBA	87%	74
Puffin Rock and the New Friends	14 July 2023 (Ireland Limited); 11 August 2023 (UK Limited); 16 April 2024	TBA	$51K	100%	TBA
Julián	2026	TBA	TBA	TBA	TBA

==== Upcoming ====
Title	Release	Ref.
Kindred Spirits	2028	

==== Cancelled ====
Title	Note
Skunk Fu!	Based on the TV series of the same name.

=== Short films ===
#	Title	Release date
1	From Darkness	13 July 2002
2	Cúilín Dualach	16 October 2004
3	Old Fangs	1 July 2009
4	Somewhere Down the Line	12 July 2014
5	The Ledge End of Phil: From Accounting	15 November 2014
6	Late Afternoon	2018
7	There's a Monster In My Kitchen	22 October 2020
8	Star Wars: Visions: Screecher's Reach	4 May 2023
9	Éiru	2025

=== Television series ===
==== Produced ====
#	Title	Premiere date	End date	Network
1	Skunk Fu!	2007	2008	CBBC/TG4/RTÉ2/Kids' WB
2	Anam an Amhráin	2009	2010	TG4
3	Puffin Rock	2015	present	RTÉjr/Nick Jr./CBeebies/Netflix
4	Cúl an Tí	2018	2018	TG4
5	Dorg Van Dango	2020	2021	RTÉ/Nickelodeon/Family Channel, co-produced with WildBrain
6	Vikingskool	2022	2022	Disney EMEA (Disney+), France Televisions, NRK, RTÉ
7	Silly Sundays	2023	present	RTÉjr/Cartoon Network
8	My Brother the Minotaur	2026	present	Apple TV

==== Upcoming ====
#	Title	Premiere date	End date	Network
9	Ellie the Ace	TBA		TBA
10	Mebh and the Wolf Pups	TBA		TBA

==== Rejected ====
Title	Note
Eddie of the Realms Eternal	Pitched to Amazon
The World According to Winnie the Pooh	Pitched to Disney Television Animation; Based on the Winnie the Pooh franchise.

=== Cooperative works ===
==== Lighthouse Studios ====
Lighthouse Studios was founded in 2017 by the studio and Mercury Filmworks.

Year	Title	Role	Notes
2015–2021	If You Give a Mouse a Cookie	Co-production	With Kuboaa! and Amazon Studios
2017–2019	Pete the Cat	Co-production	With Amazon Studios, Alcon Television Group, Appian Way Productions and Surfer Jack Studios
2019–2020	The Bug Diaries	Co-production	
2021	Little Ellen	Co-production	With Ellen Digital Ventures, Telepictures and Warner Bros. Animation
2022	The Cuphead Show!	Co-production	With Netflix Animation, King Features Syndicate and Studio MDHR
2022	The Bob's Burgers Movie	Co-production	With 20th Century Studios, Bento Box, Wilo Productions, Golden Wolf, and Tonic DNA
2022	El Deafo	Co-production	
2023	Rick and Morty (season 7)	Co-production	For 5 episodes, with Williams Street and Justin Roiland's Solo Vanity Card Productions!, among others
2025	Goldie	Co-production	Apple Studios, Mercury Filmworks, and Li'l Toughy
2025	Fixed	Co-production	With Sony Pictures Animation and Renegade Animation
2025	Light of the World	Co-production	With The Salvation Poem Project and Epipheo
2026	Backyard Sports: The Animated Special	Co-production	With Playground Productions

==== Other ====
Year	Title	Role	Notes
2010	Santa's Apprentice	Co-production	Animation production by Gaumont Alphanim
2011	Top Cat: The Movie	Co-production	Animation production by Ánima Estudios, as well as Illusion Studios
2012	Moon Man	Co-production	Animation production by Schesch Filmkreation
2014	The Prophet	Segment (On Love)	Animation production by Ventanarosa
2021	Belle	Background work	Animation production by Studio Chizu

== Awards and nominations ==
=== The Secret of Kells ===
Wins

- 2008: Directors Finders Award at the Directors Finders Series in Ireland
- 2009: Audience Award at the Annecy International Animation Film Festival
- 2009: Audience Award at the Edinburgh International Film Festival
- 2009: Roy E. Disney Award at Seattle's 2D Or Not 2D Film Festival
- 2009: Grand Prize at the Seoul International Cartoon and Animation Festival
- 2009: Audience Award at the 9th Kecskemét Animation Film Festival; Kecskemét City Prize at the 6th Festival of European Animated Feature Films and TV Specials
- 2010: Nominated for Best Animation award at the 7th Irish Film and Television Awards
- 2010: European Animated Feature Award at the British Animation Awards

Nominations

- 2009: Grand Prix Award for Best Film in the Annecy International Animation Film Festival
- 2009: Best Animated Film at the 22nd European Film Awards
- 2009: Best Animated Feature at the 37th Annie Awards
- 2010: Best Film at the 7th Irish Film and Television Awards
- 2010: Best Animated Feature at the 82nd Academy Awards

=== Song of the Sea ===
Year	Award	Category	Recipients	Results
2014	Festival International des Voix du Cinéma d'Animation (Port Leucate, France)	Prix Spécial du Jury	Song of the Sea	Won
2015	42nd Annual Annie Awards	Best Animated Feature	Tomm Moore, Paul Young	Nominated
2015	42nd Annual Annie Awards	Character Design in an Animated Feature Production	Tomm Moore, Marie Thorhauge, Sandra Anderson, Rosa Ballester Cabo	Nominated
2015	42nd Annual Annie Awards	Directing in an Animated Feature Production	Tomm Moore	Nominated
2015	42nd Annual Annie Awards	Music in a Feature Production	Bruno Coulais & Kíla	Nominated
2015	42nd Annual Annie Awards	Production Design in an Animated Feature Production	Adrien Merigeau	Nominated
2015	42nd Annual Annie Awards	Writing in an Animated Feature Production	Will Collins	Nominated
2015	42nd Annual Annie Awards	Editorial in an Animated Feature Production	Darragh Byrne	Nominated
2015	19th Satellite Awards	Best Animated or Mixed Media Feature	Song of the Sea	Won
2015	40th César Awards	Best Animated Feature Film	Song of the Sea	Nominated
2015	87th Academy Awards	Best Animated Feature	Tomm Moore and Paul Young	Nominated
2015	12th Irish Film & Television Awards	Best Film	Song of the Sea	Won
2015	12th Irish Film & Television Awards	Best Film Script	Will Collins	Nominated
2015	28th European Film Awards	Best Animated Feature Film	Song of the Sea	Won
2016	6th Magritte Awards	Best Foreign Film in Coproduction	Song of the Sea	Nominated
2016	21st Empire Awards	Best Animated Film	Song of the Sea	Nominated
2017	2nd Irish Animation Awards	Best Irish Feature Film or Special	Song of the Sea	Won

=== The Breadwinner ===
Award	Date of ceremony	Category	Recipients	Result	Ref.
Academy Awards	4 March 2018	Best Animated Feature	Nora Twomey and Anthony Leo	Nominated	
Annie Awards	3 February 2018	Best Animated Feature — Independent	The Breadwinner	Won	
Annie Awards	3 February 2018	Character Design in an Animated Feature Production	Reza Riahi, Louise Bagnall, Alice Dieudonné	Nominated	
Annie Awards	3 February 2018	Directing in an Animated Feature Production	Nora Twomey	Nominated	
Annie Awards	3 February 2018	Music in an Animated Feature Production	Mychael Danna, Jeff Danna	Nominated	
Annie Awards	3 February 2018	Production Design in an Animated Feature Production	Ciaran Duffy, Julien Regnard, Daby Zainab Faidhi	Nominated	
Annie Awards	3 February 2018	Storyboarding in an Animated Feature Production	Julien Regnard	Nominated	
Annie Awards	3 February 2018	Voice Acting in an Animated Feature Production	Saara Chaudry	Nominated	
Annie Awards	3 February 2018	Voice Acting in an Animated Feature Production	Laara Sadiq	Nominated	
Annie Awards	3 February 2018	Writing in an Animated Feature Production	Anita Doron	Nominated	
Annie Awards	3 February 2018	Editorial in an Animated Feature Production	Darragh Byrne	Nominated	
Canadian Screen Awards	11 March 2018	Best Picture	Andrew Rosen, Anthony Leo, Paul Young, Tomm Moore, Stéphan Roelants	Nominated	
Canadian Screen Awards	11 March 2018	Best Adapted Screenplay	Anita Doron	Won	
Canadian Screen Awards	11 March 2018	Best Editing	Darragh Byrne	Nominated	
Canadian Screen Awards	11 March 2018	Best Sound Editing	Nelson Ferreira, John Elliot, J. R. Fountain, Dashen Naidoo, Tyler Whitham	Won	
Canadian Screen Awards	11 March 2018	Best Original Score	Mychael Danna, Jeff Danna	Won	
Canadian Screen Awards	11 March 2018	Best Original Song	"The Crown Sleeps", Qais Essar and Joshua Hill	Won	
Critics' Choice Movie Awards	11 January 2018	Best Animated Feature	The Breadwinner	Nominated	
Golden Globe Awards	7 January 2018	Best Animated Feature Film	The Breadwinner	Nominated	
Golden Tomato Awards	3 January 2018	Best Animated Movie 2017	The Breadwinner	4th Place	
Irish Animation Awards	23 March 2019	Best Irish Feature Film or Special	The Breadwinner	Won	
Los Angeles Film Critics Association	13 January 2018	Best Animated Film	The Breadwinner	Won	
Washington D.C. Area Film Critics Association	8 December 2017	Best Animated Feature	The Breadwinner	Nominated	

=== Wolfwalkers ===
Award	Date of ceremony	Category	Recipient(s)	Result	Ref.
Academy Awards	25 April 2021	Best Animated Feature	Tomm Moore, Ross Stewart, Paul Young and Stéphan Roelants	Nominated	
AFI Fest	23 October 2020	Narrative Feature	Tomm Moore and Ross Stewart	Won	
Alliance of Women Film Journalists	4 January 2021	Best Animated Feature Film	Wolfwalkers	Nominated	
Alliance of Women Film Journalists	4 January 2021	Best Animated Female	Eva Whittaker	Nominated	
Alliance of Women Film Journalists	4 January 2021	Best Animated Female	Honor Kneafsey	Nominated	
American Cinema Editors Awards	17 April 2021	Best Edited Animated Feature Film	Darragh Byrne, Richie Cody, Darren Holmes, ACE	Nominated	
Annie Awards	16 April 2021	Best Animated Feature – Independent	Wolfwalkers	Won	
Annie Awards	16 April 2021	Best FX for Feature	Kim Kelly, Leena Lecklin, Frédéric Plumey, Almu Redondo and Nicole Storck	Nominated	
Annie Awards	16 April 2021	Best Character Animation - Feature	Emmanuel Asquier-Brassart	Nominated	
Annie Awards	16 April 2021	Best Character Design - Feature	Federico Pirovano	Won	
Annie Awards	16 April 2021	Best Direction - Feature	Tomm Moore and Ross Stewart	Won	
Annie Awards	16 April 2021	Best Music - Feature	Bruno Coulais and Kíla	Nominated	
Annie Awards	16 April 2021	Best Production Design - Feature	María Pareja, Ross Stewart and Tomm Moore	Won	
Annie Awards	16 April 2021	Best Storyboarding - Feature	Guillaume Lorin	Nominated	
Annie Awards	16 April 2021	Best Voice Acting - Feature	Eva Whittaker	Won	
Annie Awards	16 April 2021	Best Writing - Feature	Will Collins	Nominated	
Art Directors Guild Awards	10 April 2021	Excellence in Production Design for an Animated Film	Ross Stewart, Tomm Moore and Maria Pareja	Nominated	
Austin Film Critics Association Awards	19 March 2021	Best Animated Film	Wolfwalkers	Won	
Boston Society of Film Critics Awards	13 December 2020	Best Animated Film	Wolfwalkers	Runner-up	
BAFTA's Children & Young People Awards	27 November 2022	Best Feature Film	Tomm Moore, Ross Stewart and Paul Young	Won	
British Academy Film Awards	11 April 2021	Best Animated Film	Tomm Moore, Ross Stewart and Paul Young	Nominated	
Chicago Film Critics Association Awards	21 December 2020	Best Animated Film	Tomm Moore, Ross Stewart, Nora Twomey and Paul Young	Won	
Critics' Choice Super Awards	10 January 2021	Best Animated Movie	Wolfwalkers	Nominated	
Critics' Choice Super Awards	10 January 2021	Best Voice Actress in an Animated Movie	Honor Kneafsey	Nominated	
Critics' Choice Super Awards	10 January 2021	Best Voice Actress in an Animated Movie	Eva Whittaker	Nominated	
Dallas-Fort Worth Film Critics Association Awards	10 February 2021	Best Animated Film	Wolfwalkers	Runner-up	
Detroit Film Critics Society Awards	8 March 2021	Best Animated Feature	Wolfwalkers	Nominated	
Dorian Awards	18 April 2021	Most Visually Striking Film	Wolfwalkers	Nominated	
Dublin Film Critics' Circle Awards	18 December 2020	Best Irish Film	Wolfwalkers	Won	
European Film Awards	1 December 2021	Young Audience Award	Tomm Moore and Ross Stewart	Nominated	
European Film Awards	1 December 2021	Best Animated Feature Film	Tomm Moore and Ross Stewart	Nominated	
Florida Film Critics Circle Awards	21 December 2020	Best Animated Film	Wolfwalkers	Runner-up	
Georgia Film Critics Association	12 March 2021	Best Animated Film	Wolfwalkers	Nominated	
Golden Globe Awards	28 February 2021	Best Animated Feature	Wolfwalkers	Nominated	
Golden Rooster Awards	30 December 2021	Best Foreign Language Film	Wolfwalkers	Nominated	
Gotham Awards	11 January 2021	Audience Award	Wolfwalkers	Nominated	
Gotham Awards	11 January 2021	Best International Feature	Tomm Moore, Ross Stewart, Paul Young, Nora Twomey and Stéphan Roelants	Nominated	
Hollywood Critics Association Awards	5 March 2021	Best Animated or VFX Performance	Honor Kneafsey	Nominated	
Hollywood Critics Association Awards	5 March 2021	Best Animated Film	Wolfwalkers	Won	
Hollywood Music in Media Awards	27 January 2021	Best Original Score in an Animated Film	Bruno Coulais	Nominated	
Houston Film Critics Society Awards	18 January 2021	Best Animated Film	Wolfwalkers	Nominated	
IndieWire Critics Poll	14 December 2020	Best International Feature	Wolfwalkers	7th place	
International Cinephile Society Awards	20 February 2021	Best Animated Film	Tomm Moore and Ross Stewart	Nominated	
International Film Music Critics Association Awards	18 February 2021	Best Original Score for an Animated Film	Bruno Coulais	Won	
Irish Animation Awards	21 May 2021	Best Animation Sequence	Wolfwalkers	Won	
Irish Animation Awards	21 May 2021	Best Art Direction and Design	Wolfwalkers	Won	
Irish Animation Awards	21 May 2021	Best Editing	Wolfwalkers	Won	
Irish Animation Awards	21 May 2021	Best Irish Feature or Special	Wolfwalkers	Won	
Irish Animation Awards	21 May 2021	Best Music	Wolfwalkers	Nominated	
Irish Animation Awards	21 May 2021	Best Sound Design	Wolfwalkers	Nominated	
Irish Animation Awards	21 May 2021	Best Storyboarding	Wolfwalkers	Nominated	
Irish Film & Television Awards	4 July 2021	Best Film	Wolfwalkers	Won	
Irish Film & Television Awards	4 July 2021	Best Film Director	Tomm Moore and Ross Stewart	Nominated	
Irish Film & Television Awards	4 July 2021	Best Film Script	Will Collins	Nominated	
London Critics Circle Film Awards	7 February 2021	Technical Achievement Award	Tomm Moore and Ross Stewart	Nominated	
Los Angeles Film Critics Association Awards	20 December 2020	Best Animated Film	Wolfwalkers	Won	
Motion Picture Sound Editors Awards	16 April 2021	Outstanding Achievement in Sound Editing – Feature Animation	Sebastien Marquilly, Bruno Seznec, Christian Seznec, Baptiste Bouche, Felix Davin, Alexandre Fleurant, Axel Steichen, Stéphane Werner, Anne-Lyse Haddak and Florian Fabre	Nominated	
National Board of Review	26 January 2021	Top 10 Independent Films	Wolfwalkers	Won	
New York Film Critics Circle Awards	18 December 2020	Best Animated Film	Wolfwalkers	Won	
Online Film Critics Society Awards	25 January 2021	Best Animated Feature	Wolfwalkers	Nominated	
Producers Guild of America Awards	24 March 2021	Outstanding Producer of Animated Theatrical Motion Pictures	Paul Young, Nora Twomey, Tomm Moore, and Stéphan Roelants	Nominated	
San Diego Film Critics Society Awards	11 January 2021	Best Animated Film	Wolfwalkers	Won	
San Francisco Bay Area Film Critics Circle Awards	18 January 2021	Best Animated Feature	Wolfwalkers	Nominated	
Satellite Awards	15 February 2021	Best Animated or Mixed Media Film	Wolfwalkers	Won	
Seattle Film Critics Society Awards	15 February 2021	Best Animated Feature	Wolfwalkers	Won	
St. Louis Gateway Film Critics Association Awards	17 January 2021	Best Animated Film	Wolfwalkers	Nominated	
Toronto Film Critics Association Awards	7 February 2021	Best Animated Film	Wolfwalkers	Won	
Ursa Major Awards	2 May 2021	Best Motion Picture	Wolfwalkers	Won	
Washington D.C. Area Film Critics Association Awards	8 February 2021	Best Animated Feature	Wolfwalkers	Nominated	
Washington D.C. Area Film Critics Association Awards	8 February 2021	Best Voice Performance	Honor Kneafsey	Nominated	
Women Film Critics Circle Awards	7 March 2021	Best Animated Female	Eva Whittaker	Runner-up	
Women Film Critics Circle Awards	7 March 2021	Best Animated Female	Honor Kneafsey	Nominated	

=== My Father's Dragon ===
Award	Date of ceremony	Category	Recipient(s)	Result	Ref.
Animation is Film Festival	22 October 2022	Special Jury Prize Award	My Father's Dragon	Won	
Hollywood Music in Media Awards	16 November 2022	Best Original Song in an Animated Film	Mychael Danna, Jeff Danna, Frank Danna, Nora Twomey, Meg LeFauve ("Lift Your Wings")	Nominated	
Annie Awards	25 February 2023	Best Animated Feature – Independent	My Father's Dragon	Nominated	
Annie Awards	25 February 2023	Outstanding Achievement for Directing in a Feature Production	Nora Twomey	Nominated	

=== Late Afternoon ===
- Nominated for Academy Award for Best Animated Short Film
- IFTA Award for Best Animated Short Film
- Best Animated Short Film, Baku International Animation Festival

=== Puffin Rock ===
Award	Date of ceremony	Category	Recipient(s)	Result	Ref(s)
Kidscreen Awards	9 February 2016	Best New Series, preschool		Won	
Kidscreen Awards	9 February 2016	Best Animated Series, preschool		Won	
Annie Awards	4 February 2017	Best Animated Television/Broadcast Production For Preschool Children	Puffin Rock - The First Snow - Episode: 59	Nominated	
Annie Awards	4 February 2017	Outstanding Achievement, Production Design in an Animated TV/Broadcast Production	Lily Bernard for The First Snow - Episode: 59	Nominated	
Annie Awards	4 February 2017	Outstanding Achievement, Writing in an Animated TV/Broadcast Production	Davey Moore for The First Snow - Episode: 59	Nominated	
International Emmy Kids Awards	10 April 2018	Best preschool program		Nominated	

== See also ==
- Cinema of Ireland
- Independent animation
- Irish Animation Awards
