= Florida Film Critics Circle Award for Best Animated Film =

Annual US film award

Florida Film Critics Circle Award for Best Animated Feature
- Description: Honoring the finest achievements in animated filmmaking
- Country: United States
- Presented by: Florida Film Critics Circle (FFCC)
- Website: www.floridafilmcritics.com

The Florida Film Critics Circle Award for Best Animated Feature is an award given by the Florida Film Critics Circle to honor the finest achievements in animated filmmaking.

== Winners ==
=== 1990s ===
| Year | Film | Director(s) | Nominees | | |
|---|---|---|---|---|---|
| 1999 | The Iron Giant | Brad Bird | South Park: Bigger, Longer & Uncut | Trey Parker Toy Story 2 | John Lasseter |

=== 2000s ===
| Year | Film | Director(s) | Nominees | | | | |
|---|---|---|---|---|---|---|---|
| 2000 | Chicken Run | Peter Lord and Nick Park | The Emperor's New Groove | Mark Dindal The Road to El Dorado | Don Paul, Eric "Bibo" Bergeron | | |
| 2001 | Shrek | Andrew Adamson and Vicky Jenson | Atlantis: The Lost Empire | Gary Trousdale Kirk Wise Monsters, Inc. | Pete Docter | | |
| 2002 | Spirited Away (Sen to Chihiro no kamikakushi) | Hayao Miyazaki | Ice Age | Chris Wedge Spirit: Stallion of the Cimarron | Kelly Asbury | | |
| 2003 | Finding Nemo | Andrew Stanton | Brother Bear | Aaron Blaise, Robert Walker Rugrats Go Wild | Norton Virgien, John Eng | | |
| 2004 | The Incredibles | Brad Bird | Shrek 2 | Andrew Adamson Kelly Asbury and Conrad Vernon The SpongeBob SquarePants Movie | Stephen Hillenburg | | |
| 2005 | Wallace & Gromit: The Curse of the Were-Rabbit | Steve Box and Nick Park | Chicken Little | Mark Dindal Corpse Bride | Tim Burton Madagascar | Eric Darnell, Tom McGrath Valiant | Gary Chapman |
| 2006 | Monster House | Gil Kenan | Cars | John Lasseter Happy Feet | George Miller, Ice Age: The Meltdown | Carlos Saldanha Over the Hedge | Tim Johnson, Karey Kirkpatrick |
| 2007 | Ratatouille | Brad Bird | Meet the Robinsons | Steve Anderson Shrek the Third | Chris Miller The Simpsons Movie | David Silverman Surf's Up | Ash Brannon, Chris Buck |
| 2008 | WALL-E | Andrew Stanton | Bolt | Chris Williams, Byron Howard Kung Fu Panda | John Wayne Stevenson, Mark Osborne Ponyo | Hayao Miyazaki The Tale of Despereaux | Rob Stevenhagen, Sam Fell |
| 2009 | Up | Pete Docter | Cloudy with a Chance of Meatballs | Phil Lord and Christopher Miller Coraline | Henry Selick The Princess and the Frog | Ron Clements, John Musker The Secret of Kells aka. Brendan and the Secret of Kells | Tomm Moore |

=== 2010s ===
| Year | Film | Director(s) | Nominees | | | | |
|---|---|---|---|---|---|---|---|
| 2010 | Toy Story 3 | Lee Unkrich | Alpha and Omega | Anthony Bell Benjamin Gluck Despicable Me | Pierre Coffin, Chris Renaud How To Train Your Dragon | Chris Sanders, Dean DeBlois Tangled | Nathan Greno, Byron Howard |
| 2011 | The Adventures of Tintin: The Secret of the Unicorn | Steven Spielberg | Arthur Christmas | Sarah Smith Kung Fu Panda 2 | Jennifer Yuh Nelson Puss in Boots | Chris Miller Rio | Carlos Saldanha |
| 2012 | Frankenweenie | Tim Burton | Brave | Mark Andrews, Brenda Chapman ParaNorman | Sam Fell, Chris Butler The Pirates! Band of Misfits – Peter Lord Wreck-It Ralph | Rich Moore | |
| 2013 | Frozen | Chris Buck and Jennifer Lee | The Croods | Chris Sanders, Kirk DeMicco Despicable Me 2 | Pierre Coffin, Chris Renaud Monsters University | Dan Scanlon The Wind Rises | Hayao Miyazaki |
| 2014 | The Lego Movie | Phil Lord and Christopher Miller | Big Hero 6 | Don Hall, Chris Williams The Boxtrolls | Anthony Stacchi, Graham Annable How to Train Your Dragon 2 | Dean DeBlois Song of the Sea | Tomm Moore |
| 2015 | Inside Out | Pete Docter and Ronnie del Carmen | Anomalisa | Charlie Kaufman, Duke Johnson and Rosa Tran Boy and the World | Alê Abreu Shaun the Sheep Movie | Mark Burton and Richard Starzak When Marnie Was There | Hiromasa Yonebayashi and Yoshiaki Nishimura |
| 2016 | Kubo and the Two Strings | Travis Knight | Zootopia | Byron Howard, Rich Moore and Jared Bush Moana | Ron Clements, John Musker, Don Hall and Chris Williams Sausage Party | Greg Tiernan and Conrad Vernon | |
| 2017 | Coco | Lee Unkrich | Loving Vincent | Dorota Kobiela and Hugh Welchman The Boss Baby | Tom McGrath The Breadwinner | Nora Twomey The Lego Batman Movie | Chris McKay |
| 2018 | Mirai | Mamoru Hosoda | Spider-Man: Into the Spider-Verse | Bob Persichetti, Peter Ramsey and Rodney Rothman Incredibles 2 | Brad Bird Isle of Dogs | Wes Anderson | |
| 2019 | I Lost My Body | Jérémy Clapin | Toy Story 4 | Josh Cooley Frozen 2 | Chris Buck and Jennifer Lee How to Train Your Dragon: The Hidden World | Dean DeBlois Weathering with You | Makoto Shinkai |

=== 2020s ===
| Year | Film | Director(s) | Nominees | | | | | | |
|---|---|---|---|---|---|---|---|---|---|
| 2020 | Soul | Pete Docter | Over the Moon | Glen Keane Ride Your Wave | Masaaki Yuasa The Wolf House | Joaquín Cociña and Cristobal León Wolfwalkers | Tomm Moore and Ross Stewart | | |
| 2021 | Encanto | Jared Bush and Byron Howard | Belle | Mamoru Hosoda Evangelion: 3.0+1.0 Thrice Upon a Time | Hideaki Anno, Kazuya Tsurumaki, Katsuichi Nakayama, Mahiro Maeda Flee | Jonas Poher Rasmussen Josep | Aurel Luca | Enrico Casarosa and Jesse Andrews The Mitchells vs. the Machines | Mike Rianda |
| 2022 | Turning Red | Domee Shi | Guillermo del Toro's Pinocchio | Guillermo del Toro and Mark Gustafson Inu-Oh | Masaaki Yuasa Marcel the Shell with Shoes On | Dean Fleischer Camp | | | |
| 2023 | The Boy and the Heron | Hayao Miyazaki | Robot Dreams | Pablo Berger Spider-Man: Across the Spider-Verse | Kemp Powers Suzume Teenage Mutant Ninja Turtles: Mutant Mayhem | | | | |
| 2024 | Flow | Gints Zilbalodis | The Colors Within; Inside Out 2; Memoir of a Snail | Adam Elliot The Wild Robot | Chris Sanders | | | | |
| 2025 | Little Amélie or the Character of Rain | Maïlys Vallade and Liane-Cho Han | 100 Meters; Arco | Ugo Bienvenu KPop Demon Hunters | Maggie Kang and Chris Appelhans Zootopia 2 | Jared Bush and Byron Howard | | | |
