= Satellite Award for Best Animated or Mixed Media Feature =

Annual film award

- Awarded for: Best Animated or Mixed Media Feature
- Country: United States
- Presented by: International Press Academy
- First award: 1996 (awarded to The Hunchback of Notre Dame)
- Currently held by: Elio (2025)

The Satellite Award for Best Animated or Mixed Media Feature is an annual Satellite Award given by the International Press Academy.

== Winners and nominees ==
=== 1990s ===
Year	Winners and nominees	Director(s)
1996	The Hunchback of Notre Dame	Gary Trousdale and Kirk Wise
1996	James and the Giant Peach	Henry Selick
1996	Mars Attacks!	Tim Burton
1996	Muppet Treasure Island	Brian Henson
1996	Space Jam	Joe Pytka
1997	Men in Black	Barry Sonnenfeld
1997	Alien Resurrection	Jean-Pierre Jeunet
1997	Anastasia	Don Bluth and Gary Goldman
1997	The Lost World: Jurassic Park	Steven Spielberg
1997	Starship Troopers	Paul Verhoeven
1998	A Bug's Life	John Lasseter
1998	Antz	Eric Darnell and Tim Johnson
1998	Mulan	Tony Bancroft and Barry Cook
1998	The Prince of Egypt	Brenda Chapman, Steve Hickner, and Simon Wells
1998	The Rugrats Movie	Igor Kovalyov and Norton Virgien
1999	Toy Story 2	John Lasseter
1999	The Iron Giant	Brad Bird
1999	Princess Mononoke (Mononoke-hime)	Hayao Miyazaki
1999	South Park: Bigger Longer & Uncut	Trey Parker
1999	Stuart Little	Rob Minkoff
1999	Tarzan	Chris Buck and Kevin Lima

=== 2000s ===
Year	Winners and nominees	Director(s)
2000	Chicken Run	Peter Lord and Nick Park
2000	Dinosaur	Eric Leighton and Ralph Zondag
2000	The Emperor's New Groove	Mark Dindal
2000	Rugrats in Paris: The Movie	Stig Bergqvist and Paul Demeyer
2000	Titan A.E.	Don Bluth and Gary Goldman
2001	The Lord of the Rings: The Fellowship of the Ring	Peter Jackson
2001	Harry Potter and the Philosopher's Stone	Chris Columbus
2001	Jimmy Neutron: Boy Genius	John A. Davis
2001	Monsters, Inc.	Pete Docter
2001	Shrek	Andrew Adamson and Vicky Jenson
2002	Spirited Away (Sen to Chihiro no kamikakushi)	Hayao Miyazaki
2002	Ice Age	Chris Wedge
2002	Lilo & Stitch	Chris Sanders and Dean DeBlois
2002	Spirit: Stallion of the Cimarron	Kelly Asbury and Lorna Cook
2002	The Wild Thornberrys Movie	Cathy Malkasian and Jeff McGrath
2003	The Triplets of Belleville (Les triplettes de Belleville)	Sylvain Chomet
2003	Brother Bear	Aaron Blaise and Robert Walker
2003	Finding Nemo	Andrew Stanton
2003	Looney Tunes: Back in Action	Joe Dante
2003	Millennium Actress (Sennen joyû)	Satoshi Kon
2003	Sinbad: Legend of the Seven Seas	Patrick Gilmore and Tim Johnson
2004	The Incredibles	Brad Bird
2004	The Polar Express	Robert Zemeckis
2004	Shrek 2	Andrew Adamson, Kelly Asbury, and Conrad Vernon
2004	The SpongeBob SquarePants Movie	Stephen Hillenburg
2004	Teacher's Pet	Timothy Björklund
2004	Team America: World Police	Trey Parker
2005	The Chronicles of Narnia: The Lion, the Witch and the Wardrobe	Andrew Adamson
2005	Chicken Little	Mark Dindal
2005	Corpse Bride	Tim Burton and Mike Johnson
2005	Howl's Moving Castle (Hauru no ugoku shiro)	Hayao Miyazaki
2005	Wallace & Gromit: The Curse of the Were-Rabbit	Steve Box and Nick Park
2006	Pan's Labyrinth (El laberinto del fauno)	Guillermo del Toro
2006	Cars	John Lasseter
2006	Flushed Away	David Bowers and Sam Fell
2006	Happy Feet	George Miller
2006	Ice Age: The Meltdown	Carlos Saldanha
2007	Ratatouille	Brad Bird
2007	300	Zack Snyder
2007	Beowulf	Robert Zemeckis
2007	The Golden Compass	Chris Weitz
2007	Persepolis	Vincent Paronnaud and Marjane Satrapi
2007	The Simpsons Movie	David Silverman
2008	WALL-E	Andrew Stanton
2008	Bolt	Byron Howard and Chris Williams
2008	Horton Hears a Who!	Jimmy Hayward and Steve Martino
2008	The Sky Crawlers (Sukai kurora)	Mamoru Oshii
2008	The Tale of Despereaux	Sam Fell and Robert Stevenhagen
2008	Waltz with Bashir (Vals Im Bashir)	Ari Folman
2009	Fantastic Mr. Fox	Wes Anderson
2009	Cloudy with a Chance of Meatballs	Phil Lord and Christopher Miller
2009	Harry Potter and the Half-Blood Prince	David Yates
2009	The Princess and the Frog	Ron Clements and John Musker
2009	Up	Pete Docter
2009	Where the Wild Things Are	Spike Jonze

=== 2010s ===
Year	Winners and nominees	Director(s)
2010	Toy Story 3	Lee Unkrich
2010	Alice in Wonderland	Tim Burton
2010	Despicable Me	Pierre Coffin and Chris Renaud
2010	How to Train Your Dragon	Chris Sanders and Dean DeBlois
2010	The Illusionist (L'Illusioniste)	Sylvain Chomet
2010	Legend of the Guardians: The Owls of Ga'Hoole	Zack Snyder
2011	The Adventures of Tintin	Steven Spielberg
2011	Kung Fu Panda 2	Jennifer Yuh Nelson
2011	The Muppets	James Bobin
2011	Puss in Boots	Chris Miller
2011	Rango	Gore Verbinski
2011	Rio	Carlos Saldanha
2012	Rise of the Guardians	Peter Ramsey
2012	Brave	Mark Andrews and Brenda Chapman
2012	Frankenweenie	Tim Burton
2012	Ice Age: Continental Drift	Steve Martino and Mike Thurmeier
2012	Madagascar 3: Europe's Most Wanted	Eric Darnell, Tom McGrath, and Conrad Vernon
2012	ParaNorman	Sam Fell and Chris Butler
2012	Wreck-It Ralph	Rich Moore
2013	The Wind Rises (Kaze Tachinu)	Hayao Miyazaki
2013	Cloudy with a Chance of Meatballs 2	Cody Cameron and Kris Pearn
2013	The Croods	Kirk DeMicco and Chris Sanders
2013	Epic	Chris Wedge
2013	Ernest & Celestine (Ernest et Célestine)	Stéphane Aubier, Vincent Patar, and Benjamin Renner
2013	Frozen	Chris Buck and Jennifer Lee
2013	Monsters University	Dan Scanlon
2013	Turbo	David Soren
2014	Song of the Sea	Tomm Moore
2014	Big Hero 6	Don Hall and Chris Williams
2014	The Book of Life	Jorge Gutierrez
2014	The Boxtrolls	Graham Annable and Anthony Stacchi
2014	How to Train Your Dragon 2	Dean DeBlois
2014	The Lego Movie	Phil Lord and Christopher Miller
2014	Wrinkles	Ignacio Ferreras
2015	Inside Out	Pete Docter
2015	Anomalisa	Charlie Kaufman and Duke Johnson
2015	The Good Dinosaur	Peter Sohn
2015	The Peanuts Movie	Steve Martino
2015	The Prophet	Roger Allers
2015	Shaun the Sheep Movie	Richard Starzak and Mark Burton
2016	My Life as a Zucchini	Claude Barras
2016	Finding Dory	Andrew Stanton
2016	The Jungle Book	Jon Favreau
2016	Kubo and the Two Strings	Travis Knight
2016	Miss Hokusai	Keiichi Hara
2016	Moana	Ron Clements and John Musker
2016	The Red Turtle	Michaël Dudok de Wit
2016	Trolls	Mike Mitchell and Walt Dohrn
2016	Your Name	Makoto Shinkai
2016	Zootopia	Byron Howard and Rich Moore
2017	Coco	Lee Unkrich
2017	Birdboy: The Forgotten Children	Alberto Vázquez and Pedro Rivero
2017	The Boss Baby	Tom McGrath
2017	The Breadwinner	Nora Twomey
2017	Cars 3	Brian Fee
2017	The Lego Batman Movie	Chris McKay
2017	Loving Vincent	Dorota Kobiela and Hugh Welchman
2018	Isle of Dogs	Wes Anderson
2018	Incredibles 2	Brad Bird
2018	Liz and the Blue Bird	Naoko Yamada
2018	Mirai	Mamoru Hosoda
2018	Ralph Breaks the Internet	Rich Moore and Phil Johnston
2018	Ruben Brandt, Collector (Ruben Brandt, a gyűjtő)	Milorad Krstić
2019	The Lion King	Jon Favreau
2019	Alita: Battle Angel	Robert Rodriguez
2019	Buñuel in the Labyrinth of the Turtles	Salvador Simó
2019	How to Train Your Dragon: The Hidden World	Dean DeBlois
2019	A Shaun the Sheep Movie: Farmageddon	Richard Phelan and Will Becher
2019	Toy Story 4	Josh Cooley
2019	Weathering with You	Makoto Shinkai

=== 2020s ===
Year	Winners and nominees	Director(s)
2020	Wolfwalkers	Tomm Moore and Ross Stewart
2020	Accidental Luxuriance of the Translucent Watery Rebus	Dalibor Baric
2020	Demon Slayer: Kimetsu no Yaiba the Movie: Mugen Train	Haruo Sotozaki
2020	No.7 Cherry Lane	Yonfan
2020	Over the Moon	Glen Keane
2020	Soul	Pete Docter
2021	Encanto	Jared Bush and Byron Howard
2021	Flee	Jonas Poher Rasmussen
2021	Luca	Enrico Casarosa
2021	The Mitchells vs. the Machines	Mike Rianda
2021	Vivo	Kirk DeMicco
2022	Marcel the Shell with Shoes On	Dean Fleischer Camp
2022	Guillermo del Toro's Pinocchio	Guillermo del Toro and Mark Gustafson
2022	Inu-Oh	Masaaki Yuasa
2022	The Bad Guys	Pierre Perifel
2022	Turning Red	Domee Shi
2023	The Boy and the Heron	Hayao Miyazaki
2023	Elemental	Peter Sohn
2023	Robot Dreams	Pablo Berger
2023	Spider-Man: Across the Spider-Verse	Joaquim Dos Santos, Kemp Powers, and Justin K. Thompson
2023	Suzume	Makoto Shinkai
2023	Teenage Mutant Ninja Turtles: Mutant Mayhem	Jeff Rowe
2024	Wallace & Gromit: Vengeance Most Fowl	Nick Park and Merlin Crossingham
2024	Flow	Gints Zilbalodis
2024	Inside Out 2	Kelsey Mann
2024	Memoir of a Snail	Adam Elliot
2024	Mobile Suit Gundam SEED Freedom	Mitsuo Fukuda
2024	The Wild Robot	Chris Sanders
2025	Elio	Domee Shi, Madeline Sharafian, and Adrian Molina
2025	Arco	Ugo Bienvenu
2025	KPop Demon Hunters	Chris Appelhans and Maggie Kang
2025	Little Amélie or the Character of Rain	Maïlys Vallade and Liane-Cho Han
2025	Zootopia 2	Jared Bush and Byron Howard

== Directors with multiple wins ==
3 wins

- Hayao Miyazaki

2 wins

- Wes Anderson
- Brad Bird
- John Lasseter
- Tomm Moore
- Lee Unkrich
