= Vikingskool =

2022 children's animated series

- Official poster
- Genre: Adventure comedy
- Created by: Frederick P. N. Howard; Gisle Normann Melhus
- Directed by: Céline Gobinet
- Composers: Benjamin Nakache; Mathieu Rosenzweig
- Countries of origin: France; Ireland; Norway
- Original language: English
- No. of seasons: 1
- No. of episodes: 26

Production
- Running time: 22 minutes
- Production companies: Cartoon Saloon; Samka Productions; Storm Films

Original release
- Network: Okoo
- Release: 6 May – 9 September 2022

Vikingskool (also spelled Viking Skool) is an adventure comedy children's animated series created by Frederick P. N. Howard and Gisle Normann Melhus, and directed by Céline Gobinet. It was produced by Cartoon Saloon in Ireland and Samka Productions in France.

The series has 26 episodes, originally premiering in France on Okoo, a streaming service of France Télévisions from 6 May to 9 September 2022, and later released internationally on Disney+ between 23 November 2022 and 8 March 2023.

== Premise ==
Three young students, Erik, Ylva and Arni, embark on adventures while they train to become viking warriors.

== Cast ==
- Ashley Margolis as Erik Fourchebarbe
- Gina Burke as Ylva
- Jason Pennycooke as Arni Weaversonson
- Jessica Brindle as Doomhild
- Allen Doyle as Mr. Hammerson
- Claire Morgan as Ms. Sinew
- Jaye Griffiths as Ms. Eira

== Production ==
The series was created by Frederick P. N. Howard and Gisle Normann Melhus, and directed by Céline Gobinet. It was animated by Cartoon Saloon in Ireland and Samka Productions in France, with post-production done by Norwegian-based visual effects company Storm Films. The main cast included Ashley Margolis, Gina Burke, and Jason Pennycooke. The music was done by Benjamin Nakache and Mathieu Rosenzweig. The series was commissioned by The Walt Disney Company EMEA and originally announced in June 2018, to be scheduled for broadcast at the end of 2019. It had 26 twenty-two-minute episodes. They were originally aired in France on Okoo, a streaming service of the France Télévisions, from 6 May to 9 September 2022. It was later released internationally on Disney+ in the United Kingdom and Ireland, between 23 November 2022 and 8 March 2023.

== Episodes ==
No.	Title	Directed by	Written by	Storyboarded by	Okoo airdate	Disney+ airdate
1	"Supply and Demand"	Céline Gobinet	Andrew Barnett Jones; Ciaran Murtagh	Philippe Leconte; Pascal Valdés	6 May 2022	23 November 2022
When Hammerson announces that he is going to test all the students to make sure they belong at the school, Arni is worried that he will fail: he is not a warrior! On the other hand, he is cunning...
2	"Foul Weather Friends"	Céline Gobinet	Andrew Barnett Jones; Ciaran Murtagh	Florian Guivarch	6 May 2022	23 November 2022
Doomhild annoys everyone with her latest gadgets that allow her to be an excellent sailor without having to lift a finger. Ylva, who has never been to sea but is good at everything thanks to her facilities, challenges her. With Hammerson, the challenge turns into a boat race around the island of Azure, which is constantly caught in the storm.
3	"Treasure From the Sky"	Céline Gobinet	Pierre-Gilles Stehr; Xavier Vairé	Stéphane Beau; Sébastien D'Abrigeon	6 May 2022	23 November 2022
During a Viking "astronomy" class, a metallic meteorite falls from the sky, lands at Erik's feet and makes the glyphs on his grandfather's sword glow. No doubt about it: this is the sign that he is "the chosen one" and thanks to this celestial stone, he will finally have powers worthy of a real hero!
4	"Viking Fuel"	Céline Gobinet	Andrew Barnett Jones; Ciaran Murtagh	Philippe Leconte; Pascal Valdés	6 May 2022	23 November 2022
When the naive Arni gives some culinary advice to Ladeler, the school's scary cook, he doesn't have time to say "wow" before he finds himself at the stove, "since it's so easy". With the help of Erik and Ylva, he takes up the challenge. But the compliments of his friends go to his head and he soon becomes a tyrannical chef.
5	"Running Wild"	Céline Gobinet	Andrew Barnett Jones; Ciaran Murtagh	Pascal Valdés	6 May 2022	23 November 2022
After spending years in the forest, Ylva is still having trouble adjusting to "civilization. She feels particularly challenged in Ms. Tendon's "diplomacy" class. In the wild, everything was straightforward! After a hard day, she takes refuge in the forest to be quiet... but she runs into Vargir, a former student expelled from the Viking school who has become an outlaw.
6	"Goat Flu Warriors"	Céline Gobinet	Leslie Damant-Jeandel; Lisa Kohn	Philippe Leconte	6 May 2022	23 November 2022
Not wanting to miss the school trip to the Trifröst Glade, Erik firmly denies having chevrite, a highly contagious disease, even though it is not true. Result: the whole school catches this ridiculous disease characterized by sneezing, bleating and especially (supreme horror): an irrepressible desire for vegetables!
7	"Vault of Screams"	Céline Gobinet	Andrew Barnett Jones; Ciaran Murtagh	Claire Dufresne; Franck Leguay	6 May 2022	23 November 2022
Arni hasn't slept in weeks, to the point that his health is suffering. At night, horrible screams emanate from the school basement. The more Hammerson tells them not to go down to the Chamber of Screams, which may be legendary but may not be, the more Erik and Ylva want to find out the truth.
8	"The Best of the Best"	Céline Gobinet	Pierre-Gilles Stehr; Xavier Vairé	Jérémy Klein	6 May 2022	23 November 2022
At a "Career Day" to introduce students to different career options, Ylva wants to become a Valkyrie, like Turid - in other words, the Best of the Best. Eira and Turid doubt that she has what it takes. Ylva wants to prove her worth to them by riding a flying horse. Unfortunately, after losing a shoe in flight, Turid's horse is unable to fly and has to land in the middle of nowhere.
9	"Traitor's Game"	Céline Gobinet	Andrew Barnett Jones; Ciaran Murtagh	Claire Dufresne; Bérengere Jacquet	6 May 2022	23 November 2022
At the Vikingskool, preparations for the Clan Assembly are well underway. At this annual event, the twelve kings, leaders of the Viking clans, gather at the school and swear an oath to keep it open.
10	"Pet Hates"	Céline Gobinet	Leslie Damant-Jeandel; Lisa Kohn	Franck Leguay	6 May 2022	23 November 2022
While Arni is on a mission to collect pebbles on the beach, he comes across a small pebble troll. He begins to study it to become an expert on trolls, hoping to gain some respect from his classmates.
11	"Skool's Out"	Céline Gobinet	Vincent Bonjour	Claire Dufresne	6 May 2022	23 November 2022
One morning, when they wake up, the students of the school realize that all the adults have disappeared! The young Vikings have only one thing in mind: to party! Uh, wait a second: maybe we should know what happened, right? The problem is that there's no one in charge anymore, so there's no one to control this bunch of unruly kids.
12	"The Eyes of Loki"	Céline Gobinet	Andrew Barnett Jones; Ciaran Murtagh	Florian Guivarch	6 May 2022	23 November 2022
Erik is tired of the misfortunes his family suffers, which he blames on bad luck. When he accidentally digs up what looks like a "lucky coin", he keeps it preciously for himself. The incredible luck that the object brings him inevitably triggers bad luck for those around him.
13	"All Hail The Turnip Queen"	Céline Gobinet	Leslie Damant-Jeandel; Lisa Kohn	Jèrèmy Klein	6 May 2022	23 November 2022
As part of the turnip festival, the school always elects a turnip king and queen. This year, the competition is tough for the pretenders to the title of queen! Except for Ylva, who doesn't care... until Eira makes her understand that it would be an opportunity for her to prove that she has the ability to become a Valkyrie one day.
14	"Living Legends"	Céline Gobinet	Andrew Barnett Jones; Ciaran Murtagh	Sèbastien D'Abrigeon	2022	3 February 2023
When Erik successfully completes a "course or no course" challenge from the Living Legends, a secret club of students at the school, he is thrilled to finally be recognized by his peers. Unfortunately, the challenges he has to face to stay in the group are more and more dangerous. Arni and Ylva warn him that his attitude is more stupid than legendary. But after learning that Olaf Fourchebarbe himself was the founder of the club, Erik is more eager than ever to follow in his grandfather's footsteps... even though Olaf's attitude in the club was far from heroic!
15	"Battle Cry"	Céline Gobinet	Philippe Clerc	Franck Leguay	2022	3 February 2023
Hammerson asks the clan students to find their battle cry by appealing to their primal instincts - not an easy task for Arni, who is cerebral. Erik and Ylva try to help him, but instead of unlocking his own cry, Arni imitates that of a troublesome seagull. He only succeeds.
16	"Muscling In"	Céline Gobinet	Jeffrey Paul Kearney	Sèbastien D'Abrigeon	2022	3 February 2023
Erik decides to remedy his lack of skill and the shame he feels about it by going to the forest to exercise. He attracts the attention of the outlaw, Vargir. Vargir plays a trick on him that ends up having serious repercussions: for his own benefit, he manages to convince Erik and then the whole school that he is a distant member of the Fourcherbarbe family, and therefore more worthy than Erik to be considered Olaf's heir! The proof: he can make the Fourcherbarbe sword glow at will. According to the school rules, Erik's place is rightfully taken by Vargir - outlaw or not.
17	"Nosehair Heist"	Céline Gobinet	Andrew Barnett Jones; Ciaran Murtagh	Cèline Gobinet; Philippe Leconte	2022	3 February 2023
According to the Fourcherbarbe saga, Olaf, Erik's grandfather, managed to pull out a nose hair from the biggest troll, the fearsome Torre, King of the Mountains. Of course, to this day, no one believes it anymore!
18	"Solstice"	Céline Gobinet	Andrew Barnett Jones; Ciaran Murtagh	Stèphane Beau	2022	3 February 2023
At first sight, it seems like Erik is just having a really bad day. But something is wrong, and when his worst fears come true, he feels like he's living a waking nightmare!
19	"Magnhild's Axe"	Céline Gobinet	Philippe Clerc	Florian Guivarch	2022	8 March 2023
Seeking a way to defend himself against Loki, Arni uses magic to grant himself the Axe of Magnhild by using the powers of the Vault of Screams.
20	"The Light of Torre"	Céline Gobinet	Leslie Damant-Jeandel; Lisa Kohn	Franck Leguay	2022	8 March 2023
While the trio visits King Torre, Erik discovers a crystal that may be a missing piece of his sword, as it has the power to make it glow at will.
21	"The Iron Cabbage"	Céline Gobinet	Jeffrey Paul Kearney	Sèbastien D'Abrigeon	2022	8 March 2023
For the Iron Cabbage tournament, Ylva is named captain of the team. It turns out that the players were originally using a real iron cabbage. Ylva does everything she can to make things harder for everyone, not knowing how hard!
22	"Spider's Web"	Céline Gobinet	Pierre-Gilles Stehr; Xavier Vairé	Jérémy Klein	2022	8 March 2023
As part of a class, Tendon asks Arni to "find an object that Doomhild is hiding." What she doesn't know is that Tendon is secretly working for a group of bards called the Spiders, whose mission is to steal the secrets of the twelve kings. After giving him a bit of information, she ends up being arrested by Garrick.
23	"Camp Valkyrie"	Céline Gobinet	Leslie Damant-Jeandel; Lisa Kohn	Stèphane Beau	2022	8 March 2023
Turid takes Ylva and Fang to "Camp Valkyrie" for a weekend in the wilderness where, in addition to getting a taste of Valkyrie life, the girls will have a chance to prove they have what it takes. Erik and Arni are thrilled to be invited!
24	"Grandfather Goat"	Céline Gobinet	Philippe Clerc	Stèphane Beau	2022	8 March 2023
Obsessed with his grandfather Olaf's heroic status, Erik finally gets some answers during a perilous ritual to summon his ancestor's spirit.
25	"The Hand of Loki"	Céline Gobinet	Andrew Barnett Jones; Ciaran Murtagh	Florian Guivarch	2022	8 March 2023
Possessed voluntarily by Loki, Vargir arrives at the Viking skool. When he met the trio, Loki realized that his body was buried under the school and more exactly under the Vault of Screams, whose primary function is not to "catch ghosts", but to keep Loki prisoner.
26	"The Time of Testing"	Céline Gobinet	Jeffrey Paul Kearney	Stèphane Beau	9 September 2022	8 March 2023
The school's students may have defeated monsters, gods, and raging elements, but nothing prepares them for the most daunting of challenges: midterm exams!
