= Los Angeles Film Critics Association Award for Best Animated Film =

Annual US film award

Los Angeles Film Critics Association Award for Best Animated Feature
- Description: Annual film award honoring the best animated feature film of the year
- Country: United States
- Presented by: Los Angeles Film Critics Association

The Los Angeles Film Critics Association Award for Best Animated Feature is one of the annual awards given by the Los Angeles Film Critics Association.

== Winners ==
=== 1980s ===
Year	Winner	Director(s)
1989	The Little Mermaid	Ron Clements and John Musker

=== 1990s ===
Year	Winner	Director(s)
1990	The Rescuers Down Under	Hendel Butoy and Mike Gabriel
1991	Beauty and the Beast	Gary Trousdale and Kirk Wise
1992	Aladdin	Ron Clements and John Musker
1993	The Mighty River (Le fleuve aux grandes eaux)	Frédéric Back
1994	The Lion King	Roger Allers and Rob Minkoff
1995	Toy Story	John Lasseter
1996	A Close Shave, Creature Comforts, A Grand Day Out, and The Wrong Trousers	Nick Park
1997	Hercules	Ron Clements and John Musker
1997	The Spirit of Christmas	Trey Parker and Matt Stone
1998	A Bug's Life	John Lasseter
1998	T.R.A.N.S.I.T.	Piet Kroon
1999	The Iron Giant	Brad Bird

=== 2000s ===
Year	Winner	Director(s)
2000	Chicken Run	Peter Lord and Nick Park
2001
2001	Shrek	Andrew Adamson and Vicky Jenson
2001	Runner-Up: Monsters, Inc.	Pete Docter
2002	Spirited Away (Sen to Chihiro no Kamikakushi)	Hayao Miyazaki
2003	The Triplets of Belleville (Les triplettes de Belleville)	Sylvain Chomet
2004	The Incredibles	Brad Bird
2005	Wallace & Gromit: The Curse of the Were-Rabbit	Steve Box and Nick Park
2006
2006	Happy Feet	George Miller
2006	Runner-Up: Cars	John Lasseter
2007	Persepolis	Vincent Paronnaud and Marjane Satrapi
2007	Ratatouille	Brad Bird
2008	Waltz with Bashir (Vals Im Bashir)	Ari Folman
2009
2009	Fantastic Mr. Fox	Wes Anderson
2009	Runner-Up: Up	Pete Docter

=== 2010s ===
Year	Winner	Director(s)
2010
2010	Toy Story 3	Lee Unkrich
2010	Runner-Up: The Illusionist (L'illusionniste)	Sylvain Chomet
2011
2011	Rango	Gore Verbinski
2011	Runner-Up: The Adventures of Tintin	Steven Spielberg
2012
2012	Frankenweenie	Tim Burton
2012	Runner-Up: It's Such a Beautiful Day	Don Hertzfeldt
2013
2013	Ernest & Celestine (Ernest et Célestine)	Stéphane Aubier, Vincent Patar, and Benjamin Renner
2013	Runner-Up: The Wind Rises (Kaze Tachinu)	Hayao Miyazaki
2014
2014	The Tale of the Princess Kaguya (Kaguya-hime no Monogatari)	Isao Takahata
2014	Runner-Up: The Lego Movie	Phil Lord and Christopher Miller
2015
2015	Anomalisa	Charlie Kaufman and Duke Johnson
2015	Runner-Up: Inside Out	Pete Docter
2016
2016	Your Name (Kimi no Na wa)	Makoto Shinkai
2016	Runner-Up: The Red Turtle (La Tortue rouge)	Michaël Dudok de Wit
2017
2017	The Breadwinner	Nora Twomey
2017	Runner-Up: Coco	Lee Unkrich
2018
2018	Spider-Man: Into the Spider-Verse	Bob Persichetti, Peter Ramsey and Rodney Rothman
2018	Runner-Up: Incredibles 2	Brad Bird
2019
2019	I Lost My Body	Jérémy Clapin
2019	Runner-Up: Toy Story 4	Josh Cooley

=== 2020s ===
Year	Winner	Director(s)
2020
2020	Wolfwalkers	Tomm Moore and Ross Stewart
2020	Runner-Up: Soul	Pete Docter
2021
2021	Flee (Flugt)	Jonas Poher Rasmussen
2021	Runner-Up: Belle (Ryū to Sobakasu no Hime)	Mamoru Hosoda
2022
2022	Guillermo del Toro's Pinocchio	Guillermo del Toro and Mark Gustafson
2022	Runner-Up: Marcel the Shell with Shoes On	Dean Fleischer Camp
2023
2023	The Boy and the Heron (Kimitachi wa Dō Ikiru ka)	Hayao Miyazaki
2023	Runner-Up: Robot Dreams	Pablo Berger
2024
2024	Flow (Straume)	Gints Zilbalodis
2024	Runner-Up: Chicken for Linda! (Linda veut du poulet!)	Chiara Malta and Sébastien Laudenbach
2025
2025	Little Amélie or the Character of Rain (Amélie et la métaphysique des tubes)	Liane-Cho Han and Maïlys Vallade
2025	Runner-Up: KPop Demon Hunters	Chris Appelhans and Maggie Kang
