= Wolfwalkers =

2020 animated fantasy adventure film

- U.S. theatrical release poster
- Directed by: Tomm Moore; Ross Stewart
- Screenplay by: Will Collins
- Story by: Tomm Moore; Ross Stewart
- Produced by: Paul Young; Nora Twomey; Tomm Moore; Stéphan Roelants
- Starring: Honor Kneafsey; Eva Whittaker; Sean Bean; Simon McBurney; Tommy Tiernan; Jon Kenny; John Morton; Maria Doyle Kennedy
- Edited by: Richie Cody; Darren Holmes; Darragh Byrne
- Music by: Bruno Coulais; Kíla
- Production companies: Cartoon Saloon; Mélusine
- Distributed by: Wildcard (Ireland); Haut et Court (France)
- Release dates: 12 September 2020 (TIFF); 2 December 2020 (Ireland); 16 December 2020 (France)
- Running time: 103 minutes
- Countries: Ireland; Luxembourg; France
- Language: English
- Budget: €10 million
- Box office: $1,266,570

Wolfwalkers is a 2020 independent animated fantasy adventure film directed by Tomm Moore and Ross Stewart, and is the third instalment in Moore's "Irish Folklore Trilogy", following his previous films The Secret of Kells (2009) and Song of the Sea (2014). An international co-production led by Cartoon Saloon and Mélusine Productions, the film premiered at the 2020 Toronto International Film Festival on 12 September. It was released theatrically in Ireland on 2 December 2020 and in France on 16 December 2020.

Wolfwalkers follows the story of Robyn Goodfellowe, a young apprentice hunter who arrives in Ireland with her father during a time of superstition and magic to wipe out the last wolf pack. While exploring the forbidden lands outside the city walls, Robyn befriends a free-spirited girl, Mebh, a member of a mysterious tribe rumoured to have the ability to turn into wolves by night. As they search for Mebh's missing mother, Robyn uncovers a secret that draws her further into the enchanted world of the Wolfwalkers and risks turning into the very thing her father is tasked to destroy.

The film stars the voices of Honor Kneafsey, Eva Whittaker, Sean Bean, Simon McBurney, Maria Doyle Kennedy, Tommy Tiernan, Jon Kenny and John Morton. It won several awards including the Satellite Award for Best Animated or Mixed Media Feature and five Annie Awards including Best Director for Moore and Stewart and Best Independent Animated Feature. It also received the nominations for Best Animated Feature Film at the Academy Awards, Golden Globe Awards and BAFTA Awards.

== Plot ==
In Ireland in 1650, the residents of Kilkenny work to clear the nearby woods under orders from the authoritarian Lord Protector, putting them at odds with a local wolf pack. English hunter Bill Goodfellowe—with his rebellious daughter Robyn—is summoned to Kilkenny by the Lord Protector to exterminate the wolves. Wanting to help Bill, Robyn secretly follows him into the woods with her pet falcon, Merlyn. After accidentally shooting Merlyn with her crossbow while trying to kill a wolf, Robyn watches a mysterious girl take him into the woods and follows them. Upon finding Merlyn miraculously healed, she is startled by a young wolf into one of Bill's wolf traps. As the wolf tries to free Robyn, it accidentally bites her. Once out of the trap, Merlyn and the wolf lead Robyn to the wolves' den, where she discovers the wolf is the same girl from earlier. The girl, Mebh, explains she is a "Wolfwalker", whose spirit leaves her body and becomes a wolf when she sleeps. Robyn befriends Mebh, and also learns that her dormant mother Moll's spirit has not yet returned in her search for a new home for their pack. Returning home, Robyn tries to convince Bill of the existence of Wolfwalkers, but he instead scolds her for going into the forest.

The next morning, while working at the scullery, Robyn is drawn into the Lord Protector's chambers by a mysterious voice coming from a concealed cage, but is soon ushered out by the head maid. That night, as she sleeps, Robyn discovers her soul has left her body and has become a wolf. Confused, Robyn returns to the woods, where Mebh reveals her bite turned Robyn into a Wolfwalker, and helps her get accustomed to her new form. Upon returning to Kilkenny, Robyn infiltrates the Lord Protector's manor, where she finds Moll's wolf form inside the cage. Moll tells Robyn that Mebh and the pack must leave the forest, as the Lord Protector plans to burn it to wipe them out. The Lord Protector, seeking to restore control of the town, assures the townspeople that he can tame the wolves, and by extension, nature itself. He ignores Robyn's pleas to let Moll go and demotes Bill for failing to eliminate the wolves.

Fearing separation from each other, Robyn and Bill tend to their duties. Mebh, having waited for Robyn to return on a promise from the previous night, enters Kilkenny and finds Robyn, who attempts to relay her mother's warning. Hurt by Robyn's refusal to help rescue her mother out of concern for her safety, Mebh resolves to do it alone. The Lord Protector presents the captured Moll before the townspeople. An enraged Mebh attempts to free her, but when Bill restrains her, Moll bites him. Before fleeing, Mebh vows to return with her pack to rescue her mother.

The Lord Protector orders Bill to kill Moll and leads his army to burn the forest down. However, Robyn protects Moll from Bill, then frees and reunites her with Mebh before she and her pack can attack Kilkenny, earning Mebh's forgiveness. Bill follows them and shoots Moll, causing Moll's wolf form to become a spirit and return to her human form in the den, with Robyn's wolf form, Mebh, and the wolves following it. The Lord Protector and his army arrive and begin burning the forest. As Mebh works to heal a grievously wounded Moll using the same magic used on Merlyn, Robyn and the pack stall the soldiers. Mebh summons Robyn and her pack back, realizing she needs them present to heal Moll, but Robyn is knocked unconscious after disabling the army's cannon. Before the Lord Protector can kill her, Bill, due to Moll's bite, becomes a Wolfwalker and protects her. After being bitten by Bill and horrified by now being a Wolfwalker, the Lord Protector lets himself plummet to his death.

Robyn and Bill return to the den and help Mebh revive Moll, and accept her invitation to stay with the pack and embrace their new identities as Wolfwalkers. They set off with their pack to find a new home.

== Voice cast ==
- Honor Kneafsey as Robyn Goodfellowe, a young apprentice hunter and Bill's daughter
- Eva Whittaker as Mebh Óg MacTíre, an adventurous Wolfwalker and Moll's daughter
- Sean Bean as Bill Goodfellowe, a hunter and Robyn's father
- Simon McBurney as Lord Protector, an authoritarian but genuinely pious general and English statesman ruling Ireland. His character model, title, and mannerisms appear to be based on Oliver Cromwell, who commanded English forces in Ireland during this period
- Maria Doyle Kennedy as Moll MacTíre, a Wolfwalker, the leader of the wolf pack, and Mebh's mother
- Tommy Tiernan as Seán Óg, a woodcutter who believes in the existence of the Wolfwalkers
- Jon Kenny as Ned / Stringy Woodcutter
- John Morton as Stumpy Woodcutter
- Paul Young as Sheep Farmer
- Nora Twomey as Bridget, the head housekeeper of the Lord Protector's scullery
- Oliver McGrath as Padraig, a young bully in the town of Kilkenny
- Niamh Moyles as Fishmonger

== Production ==
On 8 September 2018, it was announced that Apple had acquired Tomm Moore and Ross Stewart's Wolfwalkers from a script by Will Collins. The film is an original concept that was created by Moore and Stewart, and its animation uses a unique 2D style alternating between a woodblock aesthetic and loose expressive line work.

=== Music ===
Moore's frequent collaborators, Bruno Coulais and folk group Kíla, provided the film's original score. Norwegian singer-songwriter Aurora contributed to the soundtrack with a re-recorded version of her single "Running with the Wolves".

=== Animation and design ===
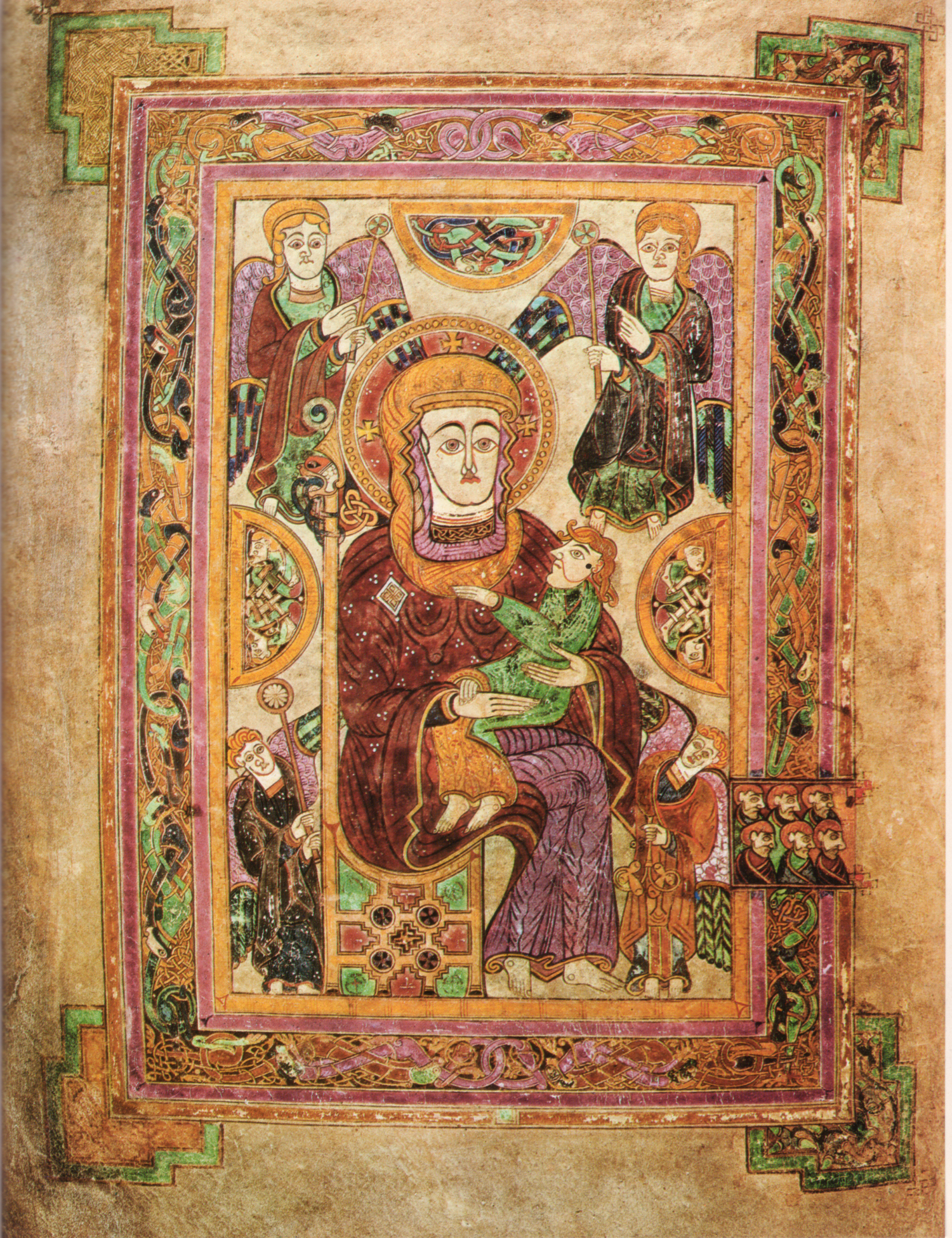
The visual design of the forest setting is in part inspired by the insular illuminated manuscripts like the Book of Kells.

The animation of Wolfwalkers was primarily drawn by hand using TVPaint with digital brushes to imitate physical pencil lines. Some crowds and background elements were animated with Moho. Backgrounds were drawn and painted on paper.

The film's visual design uses contrasting styles to represent the conflict between the forest and the town of Kilkenny. The town and its inhabitants are drawn in a style inspired by 17th century woodcuts using thick lines and angular, geometric shapes. This represents the cage-like nature of the town and the Lord Protector's rules. In contrast, the forest, animals, and wolfwalker characters are drawn with sketchy and expressive linework with curving shapes to convey the freedom and liveliness of the forest. Robyn's design starts out with the woodblock appearance of the town, but as she comes to identify more with the wolfwalkers her design transitions to the sketchy pencil lines of the forest. The art style of the forest characters also includes intentional pencil construction lines which would normally be removed by a clean-up department. The directors were inspired by the rough, expressive animation of The Tale of the Princess Kaguya and the Xeroxed animation of One Hundred and One Dalmatians which preserved the pencilled art of the animators. Tomm Moore said he had the idea that "it would be great to make a virtue of the fact that it's hand drawn and to really make it look like a Glen Keane line test or something like really, really rough and scratchy."

Certain first-person shots in the film, called "wolfvision", depict Robyn's point of view as she moves through the environment as a wolf. Many of the wolfvision scenes required a dynamic camera that mimicked the natural movement of Robyn's head as she ran. To achieve this Eimhin McNamara, the wolfvision supervisor, developed a technique that combined 3D technology with traditional hand-drawn art. McNamara's team constructed a 3D forest environment with the virtual reality painting software Quill with further refinement and stylisation done in Blender. This allowed him to previsualise the scene and adjust the camera as needed. Each frame of the CG animation was then printed out in magenta which the artists drew over with pencil and charcoal to match the film's hand-drawn look. The frames were then scanned and the underlying magenta was digitally removed. McNamara said that this technique is "just about getting an organic thing on screen that looks like people made it".

== Release ==
The film had its world premiere at the 2020 Toronto International Film Festival on 12 September 2020.

It was released theatrically on 26 October 2020 by Wildcard Distribution in the United Kingdom and on 13 November by GKIDS in the United States and Canada.

Child Film distributes it in Japan and Value & Power Culture Communications will distribute in China.

The theatrical release in Ireland was planned for the same day as the UK, but was delayed until later in the year due to the enforced closure of cinemas across the country in response to the COVID-19 pandemic. It was instead released on 2 December 2020.

The film debuted on Apple TV+ on 11 December 2020, and was later released theatrically in France on 16 December by Haut et Court. In March, Deadline announced that Wolfwalkers would be re-released to select theaters in North America, starting on 19 March 2021 with the Angelika Film Center in New York.

A release on Blu-Ray Disc with bonus features is exclusively featured in the Irish Folklore Trilogy box set in the US and UK/Ireland also containing The Secret of Kells, Song of the Sea and a bonus disc. GKIDS and Shout! Factory released the Region A box set in North America on 14 December 2021, while StudioCanal released the box set in the UK and Ireland on 20 December 2021 (Originally planned for 13 December).

== Reception ==
=== Box office ===
On its opening weekend in the United Kingdom, Wolfwalkers earned $40,802 at the box office. It was distributed in France, United Kingdom, Netherlands, and Norway, and earned a global total of $1.3 million. According to Moore, the film cost €10 million to produce.

=== Critical response ===
On the review aggregator website Rotten Tomatoes, 99% of 176 critics' reviews are positive, with an average rating of 8.7/10. The website's critical consensus reads, "A mesmerizing Celtic-inspired adventure, Wolfwalkers offers an epic ethereal fantasy matched by profound philosophies and stellar voice work." On Metacritic, the film has a weighted average score of 87 out of 100, based on 28 reviews, indicating "universal acclaim".

Sam Adams of Slate called it the best animated movie of the year as of November, praising the beauty and technical ability of the animation. Peter Debruge of Variety wrote: "In the decade since Kells, it's not just the technological advances that make Moore's latest so impressive, but the rapidly changing cultural conversations as well. He brings everything together by borrowing from timeless visual influences, leaving audiences with another stunning artwork for the ages."

=== Accolades ===
Metacritic summarized various critics end-of-year top lists, and ranked Wolfwalkers in 26th place overall. IndieWire's poll of 231 critics included Wolfwalkers in its Best Movies of 2020, ranking in 32nd place.

Accolades received by Wolfwalkers
Award	Date of ceremony	Category	Recipient(s)	Result	Ref.
Academy Awards	25 April 2021	Best Animated Feature	Tomm Moore, Ross Stewart, Paul Young and Stéphan Roelants	Nominated	
AFI Fest	23 October 2020	Narrative Feature	Tomm Moore and Ross Stewart	Won	
Alliance of Women Film Journalists	4 January 2021	Best Animated Feature Film	Wolfwalkers	Nominated	
Alliance of Women Film Journalists	4 January 2021	Best Animated Female	Eva Whittaker	Nominated	
Alliance of Women Film Journalists	4 January 2021	Best Animated Female	Honor Kneafsey	Nominated	
American Cinema Editors Awards	17 April 2021	Best Edited Animated Feature Film	Darragh Byrne, Richie Cody, Darren Holmes, ACE	Nominated	
Annie Awards	16 April 2021	Best Animated Feature – Independent	Wolfwalkers	Won	
Annie Awards	16 April 2021	Best FX for Feature	Kim Kelly, Leena Lecklin, Frédéric Plumey, Almu Redondo and Nicole Storck	Nominated	
Annie Awards	16 April 2021	Best Character Animation - Feature	Emmanuel Asquier-Brassart	Nominated	
Annie Awards	16 April 2021	Best Character Design - Feature	Federico Pirovano	Won	
Annie Awards	16 April 2021	Best Direction - Feature	Tomm Moore and Ross Stewart	Won	
Annie Awards	16 April 2021	Best Music - Feature	Bruno Coulais and Kíla	Nominated	
Annie Awards	16 April 2021	Best Production Design - Feature	María Pareja, Ross Stewart and Tomm Moore	Won	
Annie Awards	16 April 2021	Best Storyboarding - Feature	Guillaume Lorin	Nominated	
Annie Awards	16 April 2021	Best Voice Acting - Feature	Eva Whittaker	Won	
Annie Awards	16 April 2021	Best Writing - Feature	Will Collins	Nominated	
Art Directors Guild Awards	10 April 2021	Excellence in Production Design for an Animated Film	Ross Stewart, Tomm Moore and Maria Pareja	Nominated	
Austin Film Critics Association Awards	19 March 2021	Best Animated Film	Wolfwalkers	Won	
Boston Society of Film Critics Awards	13 December 2020	Best Animated Film	Wolfwalkers	Runner-up	
British Academy Children's Awards	27 November 2022	Best Feature Film	Tomm Moore, Ross Stewart and Paul Young	Won	
British Academy Film Awards	11 April 2021	Best Animated Film	Tomm Moore, Ross Stewart and Paul Young	Nominated	
Chicago Film Critics Association Awards	21 December 2020	Best Animated Film	Tomm Moore, Ross Stewart, Nora Twomey and Paul Young	Won	
Critics' Choice Super Awards	10 January 2021	Best Animated Movie	Wolfwalkers	Nominated	
Critics' Choice Super Awards	10 January 2021	Best Voice Actress in an Animated Movie	Honor Kneafsey	Nominated	
Critics' Choice Super Awards	10 January 2021	Best Voice Actress in an Animated Movie	Eva Whittaker	Nominated	
Dallas-Fort Worth Film Critics Association Awards	10 February 2021	Best Animated Film	Wolfwalkers	Runner-up	
Detroit Film Critics Society Awards	8 March 2021	Best Animated Feature	Wolfwalkers	Nominated	
Dorian Awards	18 April 2021	Most Visually Striking Film	Wolfwalkers	Nominated	
Dublin Film Critics' Circle Awards	18 December 2020	Best Irish Film	Wolfwalkers	Won	
European Film Awards	1 December 2021	Young Audience Award	Tomm Moore and Ross Stewart	Nominated	
European Film Awards	1 December 2021	Best Animated Feature Film	Tomm Moore and Ross Stewart	Nominated	
Florida Film Critics Circle Awards	21 December 2020	Best Animated Film	Wolfwalkers	Runner-up	
Georgia Film Critics Association	12 March 2021	Best Animated Film	Wolfwalkers	Nominated	
Golden Globe Awards	28 February 2021	Best Animated Feature	Wolfwalkers	Nominated	
Golden Rooster Awards	30 December 2021	Best Foreign Language Film	Wolfwalkers	Nominated	
Golden Trailer Awards	22 July 2021	Best Animation/Family	"Hope" (Trailer Park, Inc.)	Nominated	
Golden Trailer Awards	22 July 2021	Best Music	"Hope" (Trailer Park, Inc.)	Nominated	
Golden Trailer Awards	22 July 2021	Best Animation/Family Movie Poster	Wolfwalkers (Lindeman & Associates)	Won	
Gotham Awards	11 January 2021	Audience Award	Wolfwalkers	Nominated	
Gotham Awards	11 January 2021	Best International Feature	Tomm Moore, Ross Stewart, Paul Young, Nora Twomey and Stéphan Roelants	Nominated	
Hollywood Critics Association Awards	5 March 2021	Best Animated or VFX Performance	Honor Kneafsey	Nominated	
Hollywood Critics Association Awards	5 March 2021	Best Animated Film	Wolfwalkers	Won	
Hollywood Music in Media Awards	27 January 2021	Best Original Score in an Animated Film	Bruno Coulais	Nominated	
Houston Film Critics Society Awards	18 January 2021	Best Animated Film	Wolfwalkers	Nominated	
IndieWire Critics Poll	14 December 2020	Best International Feature	Wolfwalkers	7th place	
International Cinephile Society Awards	20 February 2021	Best Animated Film	Tomm Moore and Ross Stewart	Nominated	
International Film Music Critics Association Awards	18 February 2021	Best Original Score for an Animated Film	Bruno Coulais	Won	
Irish Animation Awards	21 May 2021	Best Animation Sequence	Wolfwalkers	Won	
Irish Animation Awards	21 May 2021	Best Art Direction and Design	Wolfwalkers	Won	
Irish Animation Awards	21 May 2021	Best Editing	Wolfwalkers	Won	
Irish Animation Awards	21 May 2021	Best Irish Feature or Special	Wolfwalkers	Won	
Irish Animation Awards	21 May 2021	Best Music	Wolfwalkers	Nominated	
Irish Animation Awards	21 May 2021	Best Sound Design	Wolfwalkers	Nominated	
Irish Animation Awards	21 May 2021	Best Storyboarding	Wolfwalkers	Nominated	
Irish Film & Television Awards	4 July 2021	Best Film	Wolfwalkers	Won	
Irish Film & Television Awards	4 July 2021	Best Film Director	Tomm Moore and Ross Stewart	Nominated	
Irish Film & Television Awards	4 July 2021	Best Film Script	Will Collins	Nominated	
London Critics Circle Film Awards	7 February 2021	Technical Achievement Award	Tomm Moore and Ross Stewart	Nominated	
Los Angeles Film Critics Association Awards	20 December 2020	Best Animated Film	Wolfwalkers	Won	
Motion Picture Sound Editors Awards	16 April 2021	Outstanding Achievement in Sound Editing – Feature Animation	Sebastien Marquilly, Bruno Seznec, Christian Seznec, Baptiste Bouche, Felix Davin, Alexandre Fleurant, Axel Steichen, Stéphane Werner, Anne-Lyse Haddak and Florian Fabre	Nominated	
National Board of Review	26 January 2021	Top 10 Independent Films	Wolfwalkers	Won	
New York Film Critics Circle Awards	18 December 2020	Best Animated Film	Wolfwalkers	Won	
Online Film Critics Society Awards	25 January 2021	Best Animated Feature	Wolfwalkers	Nominated	
Producers Guild of America Awards	24 March 2021	Outstanding Producer of Animated Theatrical Motion Pictures	Paul Young, Nora Twomey, Tomm Moore, and Stéphan Roelants	Nominated	
San Diego Film Critics Society Awards	11 January 2021	Best Animated Film	Wolfwalkers	Won	
San Francisco Bay Area Film Critics Circle Awards	18 January 2021	Best Animated Feature	Wolfwalkers	Nominated	
Satellite Awards	15 February 2021	Best Animated or Mixed Media Film	Wolfwalkers	Won	
Seattle Film Critics Society Awards	15 February 2021	Best Animated Feature	Wolfwalkers	Won	
St. Louis Gateway Film Critics Association Awards	17 January 2021	Best Animated Film	Wolfwalkers	Nominated	
Toronto Film Critics Association Awards	7 February 2021	Best Animated Film	Wolfwalkers	Won	
Ursa Major Awards	2 May 2021	Best Motion Picture	Wolfwalkers	Won	
Washington D.C. Area Film Critics Association Awards	8 February 2021	Best Animated Feature	Wolfwalkers	Nominated	
Washington D.C. Area Film Critics Association Awards	8 February 2021	Best Voice Performance	Honor Kneafsey	Nominated	
Women Film Critics Circle Awards	7 March 2021	Best Animated Female	Eva Whittaker	Runner-up	
Women Film Critics Circle Awards	7 March 2021	Best Animated Female	Honor Kneafsey	Nominated	

== Future ==
During an interview in 2021, Moore stated that there are currently no plans for a Wolfwalkers sequel, just like his previous films The Secret of Kells and Song of the Sea have no sequels.

No, I don't think we do sequels per se, it would be unusual if we did that but we do tend to continue in the same vein, so we'll see. The next few films that we do will be quite different. Who knows what's down the line?

— Tomm Moore in an interview with RTÉ

=== TV series ===
On June 2, 2026, it was announced that a spinoff television series Mebh and the Wolf Pups is currently in development and will be showcased at the Cartoon Forum between September 14-17, 2026. The series will be aimed at preschoolers.
