= Tomm Moore =

Irish film director

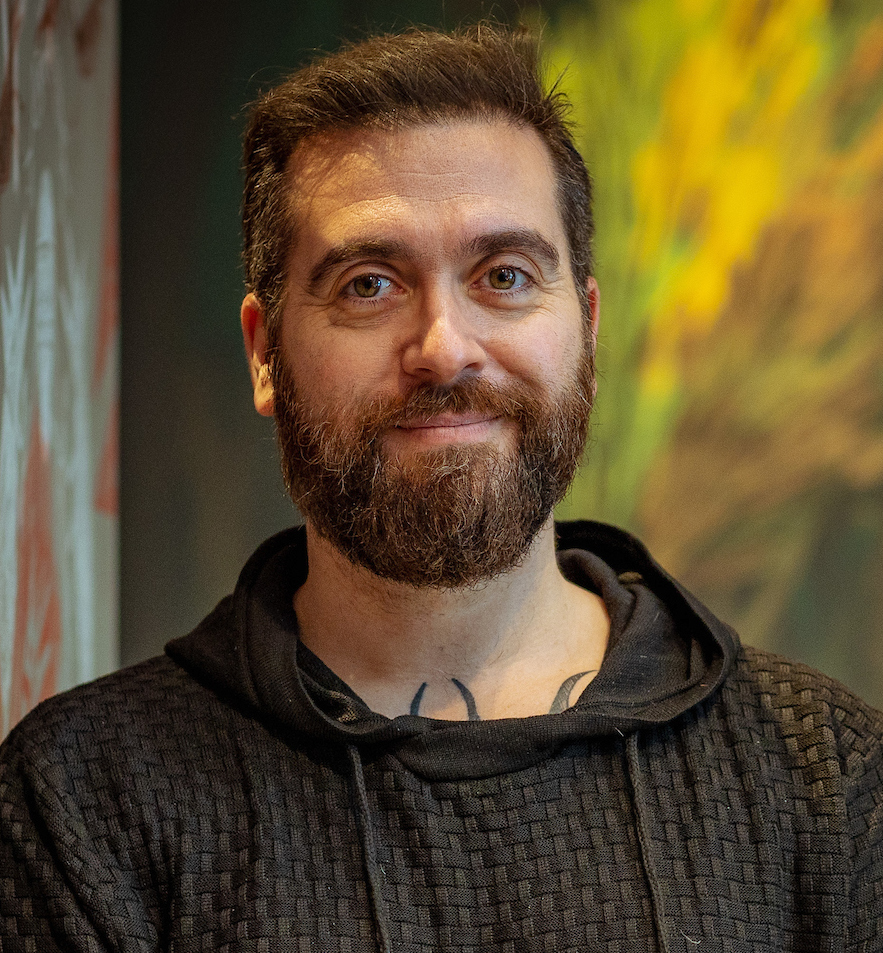
- Moore in 2020
- Born: Thomas Moore; 7 January 1977 (age 49); Newry, Northern Ireland
- Education: Ballyfermot College of Further Education
- Occupations: Film director, film producer, illustrator, screenwriter, character designer
- Years active: 1998–present
- Spouse: Liselott Olofsson
- Children: 1

Thomas "Tomm" Moore (born 7 January 1977) is an Irish filmmaker, animator, illustrator and comics artist. He co-founded Cartoon Saloon with Nora Twomey and Paul Young, an animation studio and production company based in Kilkenny, Ireland. His first three feature films, The Secret of Kells (2009), co-directed with Nora Twomey, Song of the Sea (2014) and Wolfwalkers (2020), co-directed with Ross Stewart, have received critical acclaim and were all nominated for the Academy Award for Best Animated Feature.

== Early life ==
Moore, the eldest of four children, was born in Newry, County Down, Northern Ireland. At an early age, his family moved to Kilkenny in the Republic of Ireland where his father worked as an engineer. During his early to mid-teens, Moore joined the Young Irish Film Makers in Kilkenny, where he grew his knowledge and passion for film and animation. After leaving St Kieran's College secondary school, he studied classical animation at Ballyfermot College of Further Education in Dublin.

== Career ==
During his final year at Ballyfermot in 1999, Moore co-founded the Cartoon Saloon animation studio with Paul Young and Nora Twomey. Initially they set up studio alongside Moore's alma mater Young Irish Film Makers, but the studio soon outgrew the premises. The studio created the television series Skunk Fu!.

Moore's first animated feature film, which he co-directed with Nora Twomey, is The Secret of Kells (2009), written by Fabrice Ziolkowski from a story by Moore and Aidan Harte. It is a co-production by the Cartoon Saloon, Les Armateurs, Vivi Film and France 2 Cinéma. The film is a hand-drawn animation, set in 9th century Ireland, and partially based on and inspired by early Christian history and legend. It premiered on 8 February 2009, at the Berlin International Film Festival. It went into wide release in Belgium and France on 11 February, and in the Republic of Ireland on 3 March. On 2 February 2010, it was announced that the film had been nominated for an Academy Award for Best Animated Feature Film.

In 2014, Moore completed his second feature film, entitled Song of the Sea (2014). Like The Secret of Kells, it is traditionally animated and is based on Irish folklore, specifically selkies. The film was a major critical success and was also nominated for the Academy Award for Best Animated Feature.

Also in 2014, Moore co-directed a segment of the Salma Hayek produced film The Prophet with Ross Stewart, adapted from Kahlil Gibran's book of prose poetry essays of the same name. The production consisted of different directors for each of the film's collective essays, with animation director, Roger Allers supervising and credited as screenwriter. Both of Moore's 2014 films received their world premiere at the 2014 Toronto International Film Festival.

Moore's third directorial feature film (co-directed with Ross Stewart), Wolfwalkers, was released in 2020 on Apple TV+. The film is the final installment in Moore's "Irish Folklore trilogy", comprising Wolfwalkers, Song of the Sea, and The Secret of Kells.

=== Comics ===
Moore has drawn two Irish language graphic novels, An Sclábhaí ("the slave", 2001) and An Teachtaire ("the messenger", 2003), telling the story of St. Patrick. Both were written by Colmán Ó Raghallaigh and published in Ireland by Cló Mhaigh Eo. He has also created a two-volume graphic novel adaptation of The Secret of Kells, published in French as Brendan et le secret de Kells.

== Personal life ==
Moore is a nephew of the singer/songwriter Kieran Goss. He has been in a relationship with his wife Liselott Olofsson, a ceramicist, since the mid-1990s, and they have an adult son, Ben (the namesake of the main character of Song of the Sea). He has been a vegetarian since childhood and is now vegan.

== Filmography ==
=== Films ===
Year	Title	Director	Producer	Writer	Other	Notes
2009	The Secret of Kells	Yes	Yes	Story	Yes	Directoral debut Character designer
2014	Song of the Sea	Yes	Yes	Story	No	
2014	Kahlil Gibran's The Prophet	Yes	No	No	Yes	Segment (On Love)
2017	The Breadwinner	No	Yes	No	No	
2020	Wolfwalkers	Yes	Yes	Story	No	
2021	Belle	No	No	No	Yes	Production designer
2022	My Father's Dragon	No	Yes	No	No	
2023	The Inventor	No	No	No	Yes	2D animation consultant
TBA	Kindred Spirits	Yes	Yes	No	No	

=== Television ===
Year	Title	Producer	Other	Notes
1999	Under the Hawthorn Tree	No	Yes	TV movie Production designer
2015–2016	Puffin Rock	Yes	Yes	Also co-creator
2015	Eddie of the Realms Eternal	Yes	No	

== Awards and nominations ==
For The Secret of Kells

- 2008: Directors Finders Award at the Directors Finders Series in Ireland (won)
- 2009: Audience Award at the Annecy International Animated Film Festival (won)
- 2009: Audience Award at the Edinburgh International Film Festival (won)
- 2009: Roy E. Disney Award at Seattle's 2D Or Not 2D Film Festival (won)
- 2009: Kecskemét City Award at the 6th Festival of European Animated Feature Films and TV Specials (won)
- 2009: Grand Prix Award for Best Film in the Annecy International Animated Film Festival (nominated)
- 2009: Best Animated Film at the European Film Awards (nominated)
- 2009: Annie Award for Best Animated Feature (nominated)
- 2010: Best Animation award at the 7th Irish Film and Television Awards (won)
- 2010: Rising Star Award, sponsored by Bord Scannán na hÉireann/the Irish Film Board at the 7th Irish Film and Television Awards (won)
- 2010: European Animated Feature Award at the British Animation Awards (won)
- 2010: Irish Film and Television Awards for Best Film (nominated)
- 2010: Academy Award for Best Animated Feature Film (nominated)
- 2010: National Cartoonist Society Reuben Award for Feature Animation (nominated)

For Song of the Sea

- 2014: Prix Spécial du Jury at Festival International des Voix du Cinéma d'Animation, Port Leucate, France (won)
- 2014: Annie Award for Directing in an Animated Feature Production (nominated)
- 2014: Annie Award for Best Animated Feature (nominated)
- 2014: Annie Award for Character Design in an Animated Feature Production with Marie Thorhauge, Sandra Anderson and Rosa Ballester Cabo (nominated)
- 2015: Academy Award for Best Animated Feature Film with Paul Young (nominated)
- 2015: César Award for Best Animated Feature Film (nominated)
- 2015: Satellite Award for Best Animated Feature Film (won)
- 2015: Irish Film and Television Awards for Best Film (won)
- 2015: National Cartoonists Society Reuben Award for Feature Animation (won)

For Wolfwalkers

- 2020: AFI Festival for Narrative Feature with Ross Stewart (won)
- 2020: Chicago Film Critics Association Awards for Best Animated Film with Ross Stewart, Nora Twomey and Paul Young (won)
- 2020: Dallas-Fort Worth Film Critics Association Awards for Best Animated Film with Ross Stewart (runner-up)
- 2020: Florida Film Critics Circle Awards for Best Animated Film with Ross Stewart (nominated)
- 2020: Gotham Awards for Best International Feature with Ross Stewart (nominated)
- 2020: Los Angeles Film Critics Association Awards for Best Animated Film with Ross Stewart (won)
- 2020: Music City Film Critics Association Awards for Best Animated Film with Ross Stewart, Nora Twomey, Paul Young and Stéphan Roelants (nominated)
- 2020: New York Film Critics Circle Awards for Best Animated Film with Ross Stewart (won)
- 2020: Online Film Critics Society Awards for Best Animated Film with Ross Stewart (nominated)
- 2020: San Diego Film Critics Society Awards for Best Animated Film with Ross Stewart (won)
- 2020: San Francisco Bay Area Film Critics Circle Awards for Best Animated Feature with Ross Stewart (nominated)
- 2020: Seattle Film Critics Society Awards for Best Animated Feature with Ross Stewart (won)
- 2020: St. Louis Film Critics Association Awards for Best Animated Film with Ross Stewart (nominated)
- 2020: Toronto Film Critics Association Awards for Best Animated Film with Ross Stewart (won)
- 2020: Washington D.C. Area Film Critics Association Awards for Best Animated Feature with Ross Stewart (nominated)
- 2020: London Film Critics Circle Awards for Technical Achievement of the Year with Ross Stewart (nominated)
- 2021: Satellite Award for Best Animated Feature Film with Ross Stewart (won)
- 2021: Golden Globe Award for Best Animated Feature Film with Ross Stewart (nominated)
- 2021: Hollywood Critics Association for Best Animated Film with Ross Stewart (won)
- 2021: Producers Guild Award for Best Animated Motion Picture with Paul Young, Nora Twomey and Stéphan Roelants (nominated)
- 2021: Art Directors Guild Award for Production Design in an Animated Film with Ross Stewart and María Pareja (nominated)
- 2021: BAFTA Award for Best Animated Film with Ross Stewart and Paul Young (nominated)
- 2021: Annie Award for Best Animated Feature – Independent (won)
- 2021: Annie Award for Directing in an Animated Feature Production with Ross Stewart (won)
- 2021: Annie Award for Production Design in an Animated Feature Production with Ross Stewart and María Pareja (won)
- 2021: Academy Award for Best Animated Feature Film with Ross Stewart, Paul Young and Stéphan Roelants (nominated)

For Belle

- 2022: Annie Award for Production Design in an Animated Feature Production with Ross Stewart, Alice Dieudonné, Almu Redondo and Maria Pareja (nominated)

== See also ==
- Nora Twomey
