= Puffin Rock =

Irish animated children's television series

- Genre: Children's television series
- Created by: Lily Bernard; Tomm Moore; Paul Young
- Written by: Sara Daddy; Davey Moore; Rachel Dawson; Chris Baugh; Denise Cassar
- Directed by: Maurice Joyce
- Voices of: Kate McCafferty; Sally McDaid; Darragh Gargan; Anna McDaid; Laura McCallan; Brenn Doherty
- Narrated by: Chris O'Dowd
- Country of origin: Ireland
- Original languages: English; Irish
- No. of seasons: 3
- No. of episodes: 47

Production
- Executive producers: Gerry Shirren; Fionnuala Deane; Francesca Dow
- Producers: Paul Young; Laura Campbell; John McDaid
- Editor: Alan Slattery
- Running time: 22 minutes
- Production companies: Cartoon Saloon; Dog Ears; Penguin Random House (Series 1-2)

Original release
- Network: RTÉjr (Ireland); Nick Jr. (United Kingdom, Series 1-2); CBeebies (United Kingdom, Series 3); Netflix (International)
- Release: 12 January 2015 – present

Puffin Rock is an Irish animated children's television series that airs on RTÉjr. Narrated by Chris O'Dowd, the series premiered on 12 January 2015 and is co-produced by Irish company Cartoon Saloon, Northern Irish company Dog Ears and American company Penguin Random House for its first two seasons.

It originally aired on RTÉjr in Ireland and Nick Jr. in the United Kingdom, with reruns airing on Nick Jr. Too and Channel 5's Milkshake! strand (as of 2025, the series airs on CBeebies)

The series initially ran for two series from 2015 until 2016, with a third series premiering in September 2025.

== Plot ==
Based on Puffin Island, situated off the Irish coast, the series follows a young puffin named Oona and her baby brother Baba as they explore their world.

== Characters ==
- Oona (voiced by Kate McCafferty) is a female Atlantic Puffin and the main character of the series. She is preschool-aged and treats every day as a new opportunity.
- Baba (voiced by Sally McDaid) is Oona's little brother. He is easily distracted and can be slightly clumsy at times. Baba says "Ba ba boooo!" at the end of the theme song.
- Mama Puffin (voiced by Geraldine Cole) is Oona and Baba's mother.
- Papa Puffin (voiced by Brian McMonagle) is Oona and Baba's father.
- Mossy (voiced by Darragh Gargan) is Oona's best friend, a brown Eurasian Pygmy Shrew. He lives in a tree stump on the island and is usually focused on food.
- May (voiced by Anna McDaid) is an energetic rabbit who lives in a burrow on the island. She is very competitive and regularly challenges Oona to races.
- Silky (voiced by Laura McCallan) is a grey-coloured harbor seal pup who lives in a nearby lagoon. She joins Oona and Baba on their underwater adventures.
- Otto (voiced by Brenn Doherty) is a green owl who normally appears slightly uncoordinated. He is an expert flier and shares flying tips with Oona.
- Bernie (voiced by Jim Craig) is an elderly hermit crab who enjoys telling tales of his youth to Oona and Baba.
- Flynne (voiced by Orna Canning) is a red fox who does not like to be bothered but has shown from time to time that she has a caring heart.
- Spikey is a baby common hedgehog who Baba enjoys playing with.
- Chloe is a migrating Arctic Tern who visits Puffin Rock during the summer.

== Episodes ==
Series	Episodes	Originally released	
Series	Episodes	First released	Last released
1	13	12 January 2015	2015
2	13	2016	12 August 2016
3	21	15 September 2025	2025

=== Season 1 (2015) ===
1. Puffin Practice / The Mystery Egg / To See the Moon - Oona tries to teach her brother Baba how to act like a grown-up puffin; Oona, Baba, and Mossy must help an egg find its parents; Oona wants to stay up late to see a super moon.
2. The Shiny Shell / Friendly Flynne / A Feather Bed - A shell that Baba finds attracts seagulls; Flynne the fox tries to prove that she is nice; Oona and Baba find bedding for the Puffins' burrow.
3. Beach Rescue / Lost Berries / Night Lights - A baby seagull gets trapped in fishing line; Mossy needs to collect berries for the Shrew Crew; Oona makes a trip to the sea at night.
4. Pond Life / Bird Detective / Bernie's Shell - Oona has to keep Baba clean; Oona learns about seagulls' behavior; Oona and Silky find Bernie a new shell.
5. Hop, Skip and Bump / Bouncing Back / A Noisy Neighbor - May teaches Oona how to hop "like the experts"; Oona and Silky have trouble finding a game that they both enjoy; A noisy starling bird keeps Oona awake.
6. Stormy Weather / Rock Music / Baba's Adventure - During a storm, Oona and Baba are stuck on a cliff; Oona practices singing with her mother; Baba finds his way home, with the help of his friends.
7. The Burrow Race / Silky's Slide / Ruffled Feathers - Oona and May race each other to discover who is fastest; After a storm, Silky is left stranded at sea; Oona, Baba, and Otto search for a white egret.
8. Finding Bernie / The Foggy Day / Run, Flap, Fly - Oona and Silky help Bernie get home safely; Mossy and the Shrew Crew help Oona and Baba find their way home in the fog; Oona learns a new skill.
9. Follow the Puffin / Spot the Puffin / The Sad Whale - Oona is put in charge of the Shrew Crew; Oona feels self-conscious about her multicolored beak; Oona and Silky must find a whale's family.
10. The Fast Day / Baba's Friend / Flying High - Oona and Baba try to keep up with a speedy moth; Baba befriends a green caterpillar; Oona and Otto practice flying.
11. Silky's Seahorses / Keeping Cosy / Baba's Picnic - Silky finds seahorses in the rock pool; Mossy learns how to keep warm on a cold day; Baba and Mossy set up a picnic for their friends.
12. Cave Camping / The Empty Shell / Three's a Crowd - The Puffin family visits an underwater cave; The red crabs are put in danger; Pip feels left out of Baba and Pop's activities.
13. Mossy Goes Solo / Flooded Burrow / Daytime Sleepover - Mossy leaves the Shrew Crew; The Puffins must stay with May after their burrow floods; Oona and Baba sleep at Otto's home.

=== Season 2 (2016) ===
1. Back to the Pond / The Fallen Rocks / Homesick Hoglet - The Puffin family guide a friendly frog to the pond; Oona and her pals help free a trapped Bernie; Baba and baby hedgehog Spiky go exploring.
2. Silky and the Octopus / The Salmon Leap / The Great Gull - Oona and Silky have an octopus adventure!; Otto tries to get his siblings to fall asleep; Oona and Baba protect a baby seagull from the Great Gull.
3. Baba-sitting / The Puffin Way / Bernie and the Bee - It's spring and Baba wants to wake Spiky from his winter nap!; Oona learns about the slow and steady "Puffin Way"; Baba and Oona rescue a tired bee.
4. Find the Owls / Mossy's Flea / Dinner at Bernie's - Otto and the puffins search for the hidden Pip and Pop; Mossy's flea pal Fred peps up a playdate; Oona helps Bernie prepare for a special dinner.
5. The Dung Beetle / Oona's Fishing Trip / Spot the Ladybird - Oona and Baba help a poop-rolling dung beetle build a nest; On a windy day, Papa and Oona go fishing; Baba, May, and Mossy look for ladybirds.
6. The Best Shell / The Meteor Shower / The Dragonfly Display - When Baba takes Bernie's favorite shell, Oona helps him return it; The kids enjoy a shooting star show; Baba has a close call during a dragonfly hunt.
7. Silky's New Friend / The First Snow / Oona's Cave - Silky introduces the gang to her new pal, a clever clam; The kids enjoy their first snowfall; Silky and Mossy help Oona practice burrow building.
8. Just Like Mama / Diving Deeper / A Day Out - Oona discovers the many ways she's just like Mama; At diving practice, Oona gets a special lesson from Silky; Papa takes the family on a fun day out.
9. Owl School / A Hot Day / A Summer Visitor - Baba and Oona join Pip and Pop for Otto's "big owl" lessons; On a hot day, Oona worries that Flynne may be in trouble; Oona makes a new forever pal.
10. Lamb Chase / Mossy Impossible / A Special Seashell - Oona and Baba help a lost lamb; When Oona becomes tangled up in debris, Mossy jumps into action; Oona looks for shiny shells to cheer up a sick Baba.
11. Turtle Taxi / New Neighbors / Rainbow - Bernie rides a turtle for a daring sea rescue; The Great Gull steals the seagulls' nests, but clever Oona has a plan; The kids race to catch a rainbow.
12. Puffin Treasure / Mossy's Mystery / The Longest Day - Mama treats Baba to a treasure hunt; The shrews' berries are under threat, but Mossy is on the case; The kids gather to watch a special sunrise.
13. House Hunting / Super Snail / Day and Night - Bernie searches for a new shell for Bernadette; Oona and May help Baba find his snail pal; The owls try to stay awake to watch the solar eclipse.

=== Film (2023) ===
- Puffin Rock and the New Friends

=== Season 3 (2025) ===
1. Baba to the Rescue
2. Kelp! Kelp!
3. Rise and Shine
4. Who's Been Sleeping in My Den?
5. Just Like a Puffin
6. Stormy Sing Along
7. Bug Bug Buggies
8. Puffins v Foxes
9. Marvin's Rocky
10. The Perfect Spot
11. Spiky Sitting
12. Bernie Down Under
13. A Night at the Bat Cave
14. Dandelion Drift
15. Who's the Best?
16. On the Scent
17. Hide and Swim
18. Follow the Frog
19. Buzzy Bees
20. Swimming Lesson
21. Under the Weather

== Accolades ==
Award	Date of ceremony	Category	Recipient(s)	Result	Ref(s)
Kidscreen Awards	February 9, 2016	Best New Series, preschool		Won	
Kidscreen Awards	February 9, 2016	Best Animated Series, preschool		Won	
Annie Awards	February 4, 2017	Best Animated Television/Broadcast Production For Preschool Children	Puffin Rock - The First Snow - Episode: 59	Nominated	
Annie Awards	February 4, 2017	Outstanding Achievement, Production Design in an Animated TV/Broadcast Production	Lily Bernard for The First Snow - Episode: 59	Nominated	
Annie Awards	February 4, 2017	Outstanding Achievement, Writing in an Animated TV/Broadcast Production	Davey Moore for The First Snow - Episode: 59	Nominated	
International Emmy Kids Awards	April 10, 2018	Best preschool program		Nominated	

== Production ==
The series was made by Kilkenny-based Cartoon Saloon, the studio behind the Academy Award-nominated feature Song of the Sea, and Derry based creative studio Dog Ears. The series was first announced as a co-production between the two companies alongside Penguin Books' Puffin Books imprint in November 2012. In September 2013, it was announced that RTÉjr and Nick Jr. had purchased the broadcast rights to the series in Ireland and the United Kingdom, respectively.

On May 27, 2025, it was announced that CBeebies and RTÉjr had commissioned a third series. It premiered in September 2025.

=== Broadcast ===
Internationally, the series has aired on Nick Jr. in Italy, ABC Kids in Australia, ERT2 in Greece.

Streaming rights to the series were held by Netflix in Ireland, the United States, Canada, Latin America, Spain, the Benelux countries, UK, Poland, France, Denmark and Germany.

== Film adaptation ==
By July 2019, a film based on the series was in development. The film's title and cast were revealed in February 2023, the name of the film was revealed to be Puffin Rock and the New Friends, with most of the cast reprising their roles, and Chris O'Dowd reprising his role as the narrator. However, most of the actors for the pre-school aged characters did not return, and were replaced, with Beth McCafferty replacing her big sister Kate McCafferty as Oona, and Jo McDaid replacing her big sister Sally McDaid as Baba. The film theatrically released on 14 July 2023 in Ireland and Northern Ireland, and then on August 11 for the rest of the United Kingdom. The film was also released in the Irish language under the title Puffin Rock agus Cairde Nua.

On the review aggregator website Rotten Tomatoes, 100% of Puffin Rock and the New Friends critics' reviews are positive, with an average rating of 6.6/10.
