= 48th Annie Awards =

US media awards ceremony held in 2021

- Date: April 16, 2021
- Site: Royce Hall; Los Angeles, California
- Organized by: ASIFA-Hollywood

Highlights
- Best Animated Feature: Soul
- Best Direction: Tomm Moore and Ross Stewart; Wolfwalkers
- Most awards: Soul (7)
- Most nominations: Soul and Wolfwalkers (10)

The 48th ceremony of the Annie Awards, honoring excellence in the field of animation for the year of 2020, was held on April 16, 2021, at the University of California, Los Angeles's Royce Hall in Los Angeles, California as a virtual event. The nominations were announced on March 3, 2021.

== Productions Categories ==
On March 3, 2021, the nominations were announced. Soul and Wolfwalkers earned the most nominations with 10, followed by Onward with 7.

| Best Animated Feature | Best Animated Feature — Independent |
|---|---|
| Soul — Pixar Animation Studios; Onward — Pixar Animation Studios; The Croods: A New Age — DreamWorks Animation; The Willoughbys — Netflix Presents A BRON Animation Production in association with Creative Wealth Media; Trolls World Tour — DreamWorks Animation | Wolfwalkers — Apple Original Films / GKIDS / Cartoon Saloon; A Shaun the Sheep Movie: Farmageddon — StudioCanal and Aardman present in association with Anton Capital Entertainment An Aardman Production for Netflix; Calamity Jane — Maybe Movies; On-Gaku: Our Sound — Rock'n Roll Mountain, Tip Top, GKIDS; Ride Your Wave — Science SARU / GKIDS |
| Best Animated Special Production | Best Animated Short Subject |
| The Snail and the Whale — Magic Light Pictures; Baba Yaga — Baobab Studios; Libresse / Bodyform - #WombStories — Chelsea Pictures; Nixie & Nimbo — Hornet; Shooom's Odyssey — Picolo Pictures | Souvenir Souvenir — Blast Production; Filles Bleues, Peur Blanche — Miyu Productions; KKUM — open the portal; The Places Where We Live (Cake) — FX Productions and FX; World of Tomorrow Episode Three: The Absent Destinations of David Prime — Don Hertzfeldt |
| Best Sponsored Production | Best Animated Television/Broadcast Production for Preschool Children |
| There's a Monster in my Kitchen — Cartoon Saloon, Mother; Erste Group Edgar's Christmas — Unanico Group; Max & Maxine — Hornet; The Last Mile — Nexus Studios; Travel the Vote — Hornet | The Adventures of Paddington — Blue-Zoo Animation Studio and Nickelodeon Animation Studio; Buddi — Unanico Group; Muppet Babies — Oddbot / Disney Junior; Stillwater — Apple / Gaumont / Scholastic; Xavier Riddle and the Secret Museum — 9 Story Media Group, Brown Bag Films |
| Best Animated Television/Broadcast Production for Children | Best General Audience Animated Television/Broadcast Production |
| Hilda — Silvergate Media for Netflix; Rise of the Teenage Mutant Ninja Turtles — Nickelodeon Animation Studio; She-Ra and the Princesses of Power — DreamWorks Animation; Star Wars: The Clone Wars — Lucasfilm Animation; Victor and Valentino — Cartoon Network Studios | Genndy Tartakovsky's Primal — Cartoon Network Studios; Close Enough — Cartoon Network Studios; Harley Quinn — Eshugadee Productions in association with Warner Bros. Animation; Rick and Morty — Rick and Morty LLC; The Midnight Gospel — Titmouse Animation for Netflix |
Best Student Film
La Bestia — Marlijn Van Nuenen, Ram Tamez, Alfredo Gerard Kuttikatt; 100,000 Acres of Pine — Jennifer Alice Wright; Coffin — Yuanqing Cai, Nathan Crabot, Houzhi Huang, Mikolaj Janiw, Mandimby Lebon, Théo Tran Ngoc; Latitude du printemps — Sylvain Cuvillier, Chloé Bourdic, Théophile Coursimault, Noémie Halberstam, Maŷlis Mosny, Zijing Ye; O Black Hole! — Renee Zhan, Jesse Romain

== Individual achievement categories ==
| Outstanding Achievement for Animated Effects in an Animated Television/Broadcast Production | Outstanding Achievement for Animated Effects in an Animated Production |
|---|---|
| Emad Khalili, Ivan Wang – Jurassic World Camp Cretaceous – DreamWorks Animation; Chris Browne, Brand Webb, Russell Richardson, Ardy Ala, Reggie Fourmyle – Fast & Furious Spy Racers – DreamWorks Animation; Greg Gladstone, Keith Daniel Klohn, Matthew Wong – Lamp Life – Pixar Animation Studios; Greg Lev, Igor Lodeiro, Brandon Tyra, Cui Wei, Ma Xiao – Wizards: Tales of Arcadia – DreamWorks Animation; Masanori Sakakibara – Transformers: War for Cybertron Trilogy (Siege) – Rooster Teeth Productions for Netflix | Tolga Göktekin, Carl Kaphan, Hiroaki Narita, Enrique Vila, Kylie Wijsmuller – Soul – Pixar Animation Studios; Ian Farnsworth, Brian Casper, Reinhold Rittinger, Zoran Stojanoski, Jennifer Lasrado – Over the Moon – Netflix / Pearl Studio; Amaury Aubel, Domin Lee, Alex Timchenko, Andrew Wheeler, Derek Cheung – The Croods: A New Age – DreamWorks Animation; Zachary Glynn, Landon Gray, Youxi Woo, John Kosnik, Doug Rizeakos – Trolls World Tour – DreamWorks Animation; Kim Kelly, Leena Lecklin, Frédéric Plumey, Almu Redondo, Nicole Storck – Wolfwalkers – Apple / GKIDS / Cartoon Saloon |
| Outstanding Achievement for Character Animation in an Animated Television / Broadcast Production | Outstanding Achievement for Character Animation in an Animated Feature Production |
| David Laliberté – Hilda – Silvergate Media for Netflix; Kim Blanchette – Alien Xmas – Netflix Presents Fairview Entertainment / Sonar Entertainment / Chiodo Bros. Productions; James Bowman – BoJack Horseman – Tornante Productions, LLC for Netflix; Dan MacKenzie – Cosmos: Possible Worlds – Starburns Industries; Lucas Fraga Pacheco – Lamp Life – Pixar Animation Studios | Michal Makarewicz – Soul – Pixar Animation Studios; Shaun Chacko – Onward — Pixar Animation Studios; Rani Naamani – The Croods: A New Age – DreamWorks Animation; Andrés Bedate Martin – The Willoughbys – Netflix Presents A BRON Animation Production in association with Creative Wealth Media; Emmanuel Asquier-Brassart – Wolfwalkers – Apple / GKIDS / Cartoon Saloon |
| Outstanding Achievement for Character Animation in a Live Action Production | Outstanding Achievement for Character Animation in a Video Game |
| Nathan Fitzgerald, Leo Ito, Chris Rogers, Eung Ho Lo, Emily Luk – The Mandalorian – Lucasfilm; Nick Stein, Caroline Ting, Sebastian Trujillo, David Yabu, Paul Ramsden – The Christmas Chronicles 2 – Netflix Presents A 26th Street Pictures / Wonder Worldwide Production; Aidan Martin, Hunter Parks, Craig Young, Viki Yeo, Krystal Sae Eua – The Umbrella Academy 2 – UCP for Netflix; Anders Beer, Marianne Morency, Hennadii Prykhodko, Sophie Burie, Cedric Le Poullennec – Timmy Failure: Mistakes Were Made — Walt Disney Pictures | Brian Wyser, Michael Yosh, Danny Garnett, David Hancock – Marvel's Spider-Man: Miles Morales – Insomniac Games; Jose "Sho" Hernandez, Lana Bachynski, Christopher Hsing, Matthew Johnson, Jason Hendrich – League of Legends — Riot Games; Jim Donovan, Warren Goff, Boris Hiestand, Kim Nguyen, Jason Martinsen – Ori and the Will of the Wisps – Moon Studios Xbox Game Studios iam8bit; Jeremy Yates, Eric Baldwin, Almudena Soria, Michal Mach, August Davies – The Last of Us Part II – Naughty Dog |
| Outstanding Achievement for Character Design in an Animated Television / Broadcast Production | Outstanding Achievement for Character Design in an Animated Feature Production |
| Joe Sparrow – Amphibia – Disney Television Animation; Yusuke Yoshigaki – BNA: Brand New Animal – Trigger / Netflix; Danny Hynes – Craig of the Creek – Cartoon Network Studios; Jim Soper – Looney Tunes Cartoons – Warner Bros. Animation; Marina Gardner – The Owl House – Disney Television Animation | Federico Pirovano – Wolfwalkers – Apple / GKIDS / Cartoon Saloon; Daniel López Muñoz – Soul – Pixar Animation Studios; Joe Pitt – The Croods: A New Age – DreamWorks Animation; Craig Kellman – The Willoughbys – Netflix Presents A BRON Animation Production in association with Creative Wealth Media; Timothy Lamb – Trolls World Tour — DreamWorks Animation |
| Outstanding Achievement for Directing in an Animated Television / Broadcast Production | Outstanding Achievement for Directing in an Animated Feature Production |
| Genndy Tartakovsky – Genndy Tartakovsky's Primal – Cartoon Network Studios; Hiro Kaburagi – Great Pretender – Production I.G for Fuji Television Network and Netflix; Michael Moloney – Mao Mao: Heroes of Pure Heart — Titmouse, Inc. / Cartoon Network Studios; Alan Wan – Rise of the Teenage Mutant Ninja Turtles — Nickelodeon Animation Studio; Eddie Trigueros – The Wonderful World of Mickey Mouse – Disney Television Animation | Tomm Moore, Ross Stewart – Wolfwalkers – Apple / GKIDS / Cartoon Saloon; Rémi Chayé – Calamity Jane — Maybe Movies; Glen Keane – Over the Moon – Netflix Presents a Netflix / Pearl Studio Production / A Glen Keane Productions Presentation; Masaaki Yuasa – Ride Your Wave – Science SARU; Pete Docter, Kemp Powers – Soul – Pixar Animation Studios |
| Outstanding Achievement for Music in an Animated Television / Broadcast Production | Outstanding Achievement for Music in an Animated Feature Production |
| Kevin Kiner – Star Wars: The Clone Wars: Victory and Death – Lucasfilm Animation; Paul Edward-Francis – Blood of Zeus: Escape or Die – Powerhouse Animation Studios for Netflix; Amritha Vaz, Matthew Tishler, Jeannie Lurie – Mira, Royal Detective: The Great Diwali Mystery – Wild Canary / Disney Junior; Chris Westlake – Star Trek: Lower Decks: Crisis Point – CBS's Eye Animation Productions, Titmouse; Secret Hideout; and Roddenberry Entertainment; David Arnold, Don Black – The Tiger Who Came to Tea – Lupus Films | Trent Reznor, Atticus Ross, Jon Batiste – Soul – Pixar Animation Studios; Mychael Danna, Jeff Danna – Onward – Pixar Animation Studios; Steven Price, Christopher Curtis, Marjorie Duffield, Helen Park – Over the Moon – Netflix Presents a Netflix / Pearl Studio Production / A Glen Keane Productions Presentation; Mark Mothersbaugh, Alessia Cara, Jon Levine, Colton Fisher – The Willoughbys – Netflix Presents A BRON Animation Production in association with Creative Wealth Media; Bruno Coulais, Kíla – Wolfwalkers – Apple / GKIDS / Cartoon Saloon |
| Outstanding Achievement for Production Design in an Animated Television / Broadcast Production | Outstanding Achievement for Production Design in an Animated Feature Production |
| Julien Bisaro – Shooom's Odyssey – Picolo Pictures; Glenn Hernandez, Matthieu Saghezchi – Baba Yaga – Baobab Studios; Negar Bagheri – The Adventures of Paddington – Blue-Zoo Animation Studio and Nickelodeon Animation Studio; Raymond Zibach – To: Gerard – DreamWorks Animation; Eastwood Wong, Sylvia Liu, Elaine Lee, Tor Aunet, Lauren Zurcher – Trash Truck – Glen Keane Productions for Netflix | María Pareja, Ross Stewart, Tomm Moore – Wolfwalkers – Apple / GKIDS / Cartoon Saloon; Noah Klocek, Sharon Calahan, Huy Nguyen, Bert Berry, Paul Conrad – Onward – Pixar Animation Studios; Steve Pilcher, Albert Lozano, Paul Abadilla, Bryn Imagire – Soul – Pixar Animation Studios; Kyle McQueen – The Willoughbys – Netflix Presents A BRON Animation Production in association with Creative Wealth Media; Kendal Cronkhite Shaindlin, Timothy Lamb – Trolls World Tour – DreamWorks Animation |
| Outstanding Achievement for Storyboarding in an Animated Television / Broadcast Production | Outstanding Achievement for Storyboarding in an Animated Feature Production |
| Andrew Dickman – Looney Tunes Cartoons – Warner Bros. Animation; Ben McLaughlin – Archibald's Next Big Thing – DreamWorks Animation; Kiana Khansmith – Big City Greens – Walt Disney Television Animation; Milo Neuman – Mortal Kombat Legends: Scorpion's Revenge – Warner Bros. Animation; Julien Bisaro – Shooom's Odyssey – Picolo Pictures | Trevor Jimenez – Soul – Pixar Animation Studios; Gorō Miyazaki – Earwig and the Witch — Studio Ghibli; Glen Keane – Over the Moon – Netflix Presents a Netflix / Pearl Studio Production / A Glen Keane Productions Presentation; Evon Freeman – The Croods: A New Age – DreamWorks Animation; Guillaume Lorin – Wolfwalkers – Apple / GKIDS / Cartoon Saloon |
| Outstanding Achievement for Voice Acting in an Animated Television / Broadcast Production | Outstanding Achievement for Voice Acting in an Animated Feature Production |
| David Bradley – Wizards: Tales of Arcadia — DreamWorks Animation; Jeff Bennett – DreamWorks Dragons: Rescue Riders — DreamWorks Animation; Jessica DiCicco – It's Pony – Blue-Zoo Animation and Nickelodeon Animation Studio; Ashley Tisdale – Phineas and Ferb the Movie: Candace Against the Universe – Walt Disney Television Animation & Disney+; Patrick Seitz – ThunderCats Roar – Warner Bros. Animation | Eva Whittaker – Wolfwalkers – Apple / GKIDS / Cartoon Saloon; Vanessa Marshall – Earwig and the Witch – Studio Ghibli; Tom Holland – Onward – Pixar Animation Studios; Robert G. Chiu – Over the Moon – Netflix Presents a Netflix / Pearl Studio Production / A Glen Keane Productions Presentation; Nicolas Cage – The Croods: A New Age — DreamWorks Animation |
| Outstanding Achievement for Writing in an Animated Television / Broadcast Production | Outstanding Achievement for Writing in an Animated Feature Production |
| Andrew Goldberg, Patti Harrison – Big Mouth – Netflix; Jeff Trammell, Tiffany Ford, Dashawn Mahone, Najja Porter – Craig of the Creek – Cartoon Network Studios; Krista Tucker, Andy Guerdat, Matt Hoverman, Laurie Israel, Marisa Evans-Sanden – Fancy Nancy – Disney Television Animation; Sarah Peters – Harley Quinn – Eshugadee Productions in association with Warner Bros. Animation; ND Stevenson – She-Ra and the Princesses of Power – DreamWorks Animation | Pete Docter, Mike Jones, Kemp Powers – Soul – Pixar Animation Studios; Mark Burton, Jon Brown – A Shaun the Sheep Movie: Farmageddon – StudioCanal and Aardman present in association with Anton Capital Entertainment An Aardman Production for Netflix; Dan Scanlon, Jason Headley, Keith Bunin – Onward – Pixar Animation Studios; Audrey Wells – Over the Moon – Netflix Presents a Netflix / Pearl Studio Production / A Glen Keane Productions Presentation (posthumous nomination); Will Collins – Wolfwalkers – Apple / GKIDS / Cartoon Saloon |
| Outstanding Achievement for Editorial in an Animated Television / Broadcast Production | Outstanding Achievement for Editorial in an Animated Feature Production |
| John McKinnon – Hilda – Silvergate Media for Netflix; Brandon Terry, Ezra Dweck, Del Spiva – Cops and Robbers – Lawrence Bender Productions for Netflix; Peter Ettinger, Michael Babcock – If Anything Happens I Love You — Gilbert Films / Oh Good Productions for Netflix; Serena Warner – Lamp Life – Pixar Animation Studios; James Ryan – To: Gerard — DreamWorks Animation | Kevin Nolting, Gregory Amundson, Robert Grahamjones, Amera Rizk – Soul – Pixar Animation Studios; Sim Evan-Jones, ACE, Adrian Rhodes – A Shaun the Sheep Movie: Farmageddon – StudioCanal and Aardman; Benjamin Massoubre – Calamity Jane — Maybe Movies; Catherine Apple, Anna Wolitzky, Dave Suther – Onward – Pixar Animation Studios; Fiona Toth, Ken Schretzmann, ACE – The Willoughbys – Netflix Presents A BRON Animation Production in association with Creative Wealth Media |

== Additional Individual Awards ==
=== June Foray Award ===
Daisuke "Dice" Tsutsumi

=== Special Achievement in Animation ===
Howard — Don Hahn, director

=== Ub Iwerks Award ===
Epic Games for Unreal Engine

=== Winsor McCay Lifetime Achievement Awards ===
- Willie Ito
- Sue Nichols (posthumously)
- Bruce Smith

== Multiple awards and nominations ==
=== Films ===
The following films received multiple nominations:

| Nominations | Film |
|---|---|
| 10 | Soul |
| 10 | Wolfwalkers |
| 7 | Onward |
| 6 | Over the Moon |
| 6 | The Croods: A New Age |
| 6 | The Willoughbys |
| 4 | Trolls World Tour |
| 3 | A Shaun the Sheep Movie: Farmageddon |
| 3 | Calamity Jane |
| 2 | Earwig and the Witch |
| 2 | Ride Your Wave |

The following films received multiple awards:

| Wins | Film |
|---|---|
| 7 | Soul |
| 5 | Wolfwalkers |

=== Television/Broadcast ===
The following shows received multiple nominations:

| Nominations | Show |
|---|---|
| 3 | Hilda |
| 3 | Shooom's Odyssey |
| 3 | Lamp Life |
| 2 | The Adventures of Paddington |
| 2 | Rise of the Teenage Mutant Ninja Turtles |
| 2 | She-Ra and the Princesses of Power |
| 2 | Star Wars: The Clone Wars |
| 2 | Genndy Tartakovsky's Primal |
| 2 | Harley Quinn |
| 2 | Baba Yaga |
| 2 | Wizards: Tales of Arcadia |
| 2 | Craig of the Creek |
| 2 | Looney Tunes Cartoons |
| 2 | To Gerald |

The following shows received multiple awards:

| Wins | Show |
|---|---|
| 3 | Hilda |
| 2 | Genndy Tartakovsky's Primal |
