= Dallas–Fort Worth Film Critics Association Award for Best Animated Film =

American film award

- Country: United States
- Presented by: Dallas–Fort Worth Film Critics Association
- First award: Hendel Butoy and Mike Gabriel; The Rescuers Down Under (1990)
- Currently held by: Maggie Kang; KPop Demon Hunters (2025)
- Website: dfwcritics.com

The Dallas–Fort Worth Film Critics Association Award for Best Animated Film is an award presented by the Dallas–Fort Worth Film Critics Association (DFWFCA) to honor an outstanding animated film. Toy Story is the only franchise with multiple wins, winning for Toy Story (1995), Toy Story 3 (2010) and Toy Story 4 (2019).

== Winners and nominees ==
=== 1990s ===
Year	Film	Director(s)	Nominees		
1990	The Rescuers Down Under	Hendel Butoy and Mike Gabriel	DuckTales the Movie: Treasure of the Lost Lamp	Bob Hathcock Naksitrallid	Avo Paistik
1991	Beauty and the Beast	Gary Trousdale and Kirk Wise	An American Tail: Fievel Goes West	Phil Nibbelink Rover Dangerfield	James L. George and Bob Seeley
1992	Aladdin	John Musker and Ron Clements	Bebe's Kids	Bruce W. Smith FernGully: The Last Rainforest	Bill Kroyer
1993	The Nightmare Before Christmas	Henry Selick	Once Upon a Forest	Charles Grosvenor We're Back! A Dinosaur's Story	Dick Zondag and Ralph Zondag
1994	The Lion King	Roger Allers and Rob Minkoff	A Troll in Central Park	Don Bluth The Swan Princess	Richard Rich
1995	Toy Story	John Lasseter	The Pebble and the Penguin	Don Bluth and Gary Goldman Pocahontas	Mike Gabriel and Eric Goldberg
1996	James and the Giant Peach	Henry Selick	The Hunchback of Notre Dame	Gary Trousdale Space Jam	Joe Pytka
1997	Anastasia	Don Bluth and Gary Goldman	Cats Don't Dance	Mark Dindal Hercules	Ron Clements and John Musker
1998	The Prince of Egypt	Brenda Chapman, Steve Hickner, and Simon Wells	A Bug's Life	John Lasseter Mulan	Tony Bancroft and Barry Cook
1999	The Iron Giant	Brad Bird	Tarzan	Kevin Lima and Chris Buck Toy Story 2	John Lasseter

=== 2000s ===
Year	Film	Director(s)	Nominees				
2000	Chicken Run	Peter Lord and Nick Park	The Emperor's New Groove	Mark Dindal The Road to El Dorado	Don Paul and Eric "Bibo" Bergeron		
2001	Shrek	Andrew Adamson and Vicky Jenson	Jimmy Neutron: Boy Genius	John A. Davis Monsters, Inc.	Pete Docter		
2002	Spirited Away (Sen to Chihiro no kamikakushi)	Hayao Miyazaki	Ice Age	Chris Wedge Lilo & Stitch	Chris Sanders and Dean DeBlois Spirit: Stallion of the Cimarron	Kelly Asbury and Lorna Cook The Wild Thornberrys Movie	Jeff McGrath and Cathy Malkasian
2003	Finding Nemo	Andrew Stanton	Brother Bear	Aaron Blaise and Robert Walker Sinbad: Legend of the Seven Seas	Tim Johnson and Patrick Gilmore		
2004	The Incredibles	Brad Bird	Shark Tale	Vicky Jenson Shrek 2	Andrew Adamson		
2005	Wallace & Gromit: The Curse of the Were-Rabbit	Steve Box and Nick Park	Chicken Little	Mark Dindal Corpse Bride	Tim Burton and Mike Johnson Howl's Moving Castle – Hayao Miyazaki Madagascar	Eric Darnell and Tom McGrath	
2006	Happy Feet	George Miller	Cars	John Lasseter Flushed Away	David Bowers Ice Age: The Meltdown	Carlos Saldanha Monster House	Gil Kenan
2007	Ratatouille	Brad Bird	Bee Movie	Steve Hickner and Simon J. Smith Persepolis	Marjane Satrapi and Vincent Paronnaud Shrek the Third	Chris Miller Surf's Up	Ash Brannon and Chris Buck
2008	WALL-E	Andrew Stanton	Bolt	Chris Williams and Byron Howard Horton Hears a Who!	Jimmy Hayward and Steve Martino Kung Fu Panda	John Wayne Stevenson and Mark Osborne Madagascar: Escape 2 Africa	Eric Darnell and Tom McGrath
2009	Up	Pete Docter	Cloudy with a Chance of Meatballs	Phil Lord and Christopher Miller Coraline	Henry Selick Fantastic Mr. Fox	Wes Anderson The Princess and the Frog	Ron Clements and John Musker

=== 2010s ===
Year	Film	Director(s)	Nominees				
2010	Toy Story 3	Lee Unkrich	Despicable Me	Pierre Coffin and Chris Renaud How To Train Your Dragon	Chris Sanders and Dean DeBlois The Illusionist	Sylvain Chomet Tangled	Nathan Greno and Byron Howard
2011	Rango	Gore Verbinski	Arthur Christmas	Sarah Smith Cars 2	John Lasseter and Brad Lewis Kung Fu Panda 2	Jennifer Yuh Nelson Puss in Boots	Chris Miller
2012	ParaNorman	Sam Fell and Chris Butler	Brave	Mark Andrews and Brenda Chapman Hotel Transylvania	Genndy Tartakovsky Madagascar 3: Europe's Most Wanted	Tom McGrath, Eric Darnell, and Conrad Vernon Wreck-It Ralph	Rich Moore
2013	Frozen	Chris Buck and Jennifer Lee	The Croods	Chris Sanders and Kirk DeMicco Despicable Me 2	Pierre Coffin and Chris Renaud Epic	Chris Wedge Monsters University	Dan Scanlon
2014	The Lego Movie	Phil Lord and Christopher Miller	Big Hero 6	Don Hall and Chris Williams The Book of Life	Jorge R. Gutierrez The Boxtrolls	Anthony Stacchi and Graham Annable How to Train Your Dragon 2	Dean DeBlois
2015	Inside Out	Pete Docter and Ronnie del Carmen	Anomalisa	Charlie Kaufman and Duke Johnson Hotel Transylvania 2	Genndy Tartakovsky The Peanuts Movie	Steve Martino Shaun the Sheep Movie	Richard Starzak and Mark Burton
2016	Zootopia	Byron Howard and Rich Moore	Kubo and the Two Strings	Travis Knight Moana	Ron Clements and John Musker Ice Age: Collision Course	Mike Thurmeier Finding Dory	Andrew Stanton
2017	Coco	Lee Unkrich	Loving Vincent	Dorota Kobiela and Hugh Welchman Ferdinand	Carlos Saldanha Cars 3	Brian Fee The Lego Batman Movie	Chris McKay
2018	Isle of Dogs	Wes Anderson	Spider-Man: Into the Spider-Verse	Bob Persichetti, Peter Ramsey, and Rodney Rothman Incredibles 2	Brad Bird Ralph Breaks the Internet	Rich Moore and Phil Johnston Mirai	Mamoru Hosoda
2019	Toy Story 4	Josh Cooley	I Lost My Body	Jérémy Clapin Frozen II	Chris Buck And Jennifer Lee How to Train Your Dragon: The Hidden World	Dean DeBlois Missing Link	Chris Butler

=== 2020s ===
Year	Film	Director(s)	Runners-up	
2020	Soul	Pete Docter	Wolfwalkers	Tomm Moore and Ross Stewart
2021	Encanto	Jared Bush and Byron Howard	The Mitchells vs. the Machines	Mike Rianda
2022	Guillermo del Toro's Pinocchio	Guillermo del Toro	Marcel the Shell with Shoes On	Dean Fleischer Camp
2023	The Boy and the Heron	Hayao Miyazaki	Spider-Man: Across the Spider-Verse	Kemp Powers
2024	The Wild Robot	Chris Sanders	Flow	Gints Zilbalodis
2025	KPop Demon Hunters	Maggie Kang	Arco	

== Multiple wins and nominations ==
=== Wins ===
- Brad Bird - 3
- Pete Docter - 3
- Byron Howard - 2
- Hayao Miyazaki - 2
- Nick Park - 2
- Henry Selick - 2
- Lee Unkrich - 2

=== Nominations ===
- John Lasseter - 5 (one win)
- Ron Clements and John Musker - 4 (one win)
- Chris Sanders - 3 (one win)
