= Paul Young (producer) =

Irish animator, illustrator, cartoonist and film producer

- Citizenship: Ireland
- Occupations: animator; illustrator; cartoonist; writer; producer; director; voice actor; entrepreneur
- Years active: 1999–present
- Employer: Cartoon Saloon
- Organization: Cartoon Saloon
- Known for: Song of the Sea; The Breadwinner; Wolfwalkers
- Awards: See § Accolades

Paul Young is an Irish animator, illustrator, cartoonist, writer, producer, director, and voice actor. He is the CEO of Cartoon Saloon, a four-times Academy Award nominated and BAFTA nominated Irish animation studio. He co-founded the studio in 1999 with Tomm Moore and Nora Twomey. In 2015 he was a finalist in the Ernst & Young Entrepreneur of the Year Award. He has been a board member of Animation Ireland.

== Education ==
Whilst travelling, having completed a degree in Art and Design at the University of Ulster, Young discovered he could make more money selling caricatures to tourists on the beach than selling sandwiches and was inspired to pursue animation as a career, enrolling on the animation degree course at Ballyfermot College of Further Education in Dublin on his return. On the course Young met Tomm Moore and they co-founded Cartoon Saloon in 1999, after their graduation, along with Nora Twomey, fellow alumni.

== Career ==
In the early days of Cartoon Saloon, the studio employed 12 animators and relied on commercial and corporate work including web-site design and CD ROM production with Young focusing on illustration whilst Tomm Moore undertook the animation. At that time the studio was searching for funding and according to Young “He found himself drawn toward the business side of the venture, mainly because his desk was next to the phone.”

From 2007 to 2008, Young was executive producer of Skunk Fu!, which went on to receive a BAFTA nomination in 2008 and to be distributed world-wide including to Cartoon Network and the BBC. Young also produced the Oscar-nominated animated feature films The Secret of Kells, Song of the Sea and Wolfwalkers.

== Accolades ==
- 2008 – BAFTA nomination for Skunk Fu!
- 2015 – finalist in the Ernst & Young Entrepreneur of the Year Award.
- 2021 – Producers Guild of America Award nomination for Wolfwalkers
- 2023 – Annie Award for Outstanding Achievement for Directing in an Animated Television/Broadcast Production
