= Nora Twomey =

Irish animator, director, screenwriter, producer and voice actress

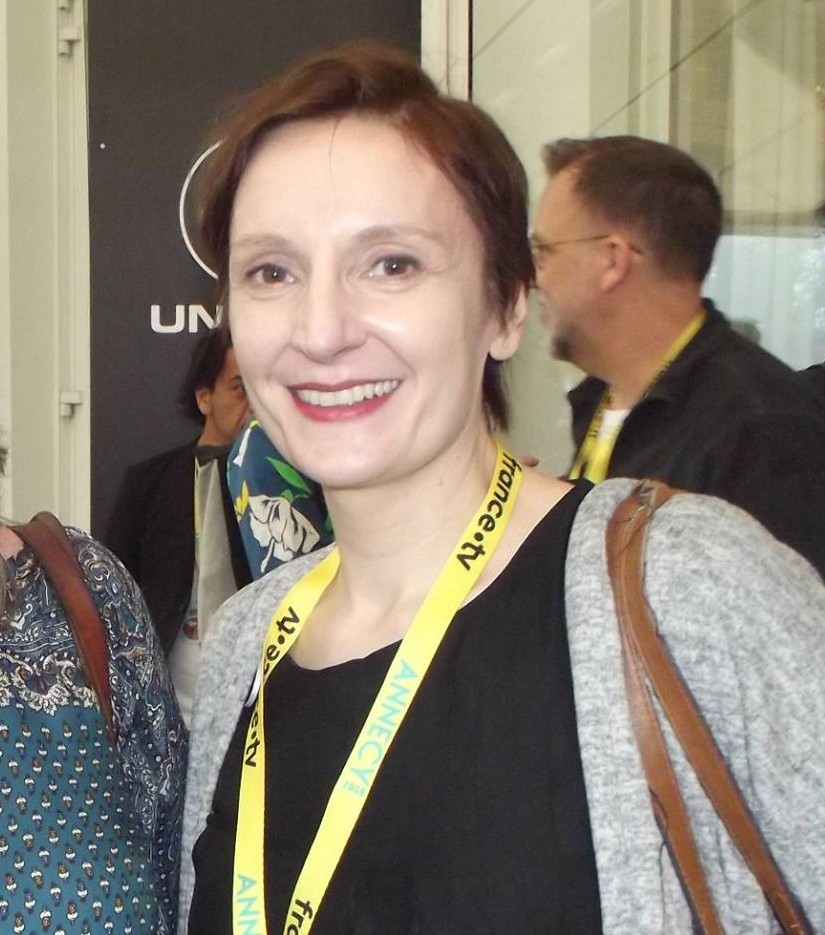
- Twomey in 2018
- Born: 31 October 1971 (age 54); Cork City, County Cork, Munster, Ireland
- Education: Ballyfermot College
- Occupations: Producer, film director, animator
- Years active: 2002–present
- Known for: The Secret of Kells; The Breadwinner; My Father's Dragon

Nora Twomey (born 31 October 1971) is an Irish animator, director, screenwriter, producer and voice actress. She is best known as the co-founder of Cartoon Saloon, alongside Tomm Moore and Paul Young, an animation studio and production company, based in Kilkenny City, Ireland. She is best known for co-directing The Secret of Kells and directing The Breadwinner. Her work on both films earned Academy Award nominations for Best Animated Feature.

== Early life ==
Twomey was educated at St. Mary's Secondary School in Midleton, County Cork but left before completing the Leaving Certificate at the age of 15. She did manual labor at a local factory but continued to draw and briefly studied fine art before she was admitted to Ballyfermot College in Dublin to their School of Animation program on the basis of her portfolio. In the factory Twomey operated a conveyor belt for up to twelve hours on end during the night shift. Twomey credits this period of her life to much of her success, as she wore headphones to drown out the loud noise of machinery, the silence combined with the monotony of the task she performed allowed her to ponder concepts and generate ideas, many of which would be put to film later in her life. She graduated from Ballyfermot College in 1995.

== Career ==
After graduating from Ballyfermot College, Twomey began to work for Brown Bags Film animation studio in Dublin. In 1999, she helped found Cartoon Saloon, along with Tomm Moore, Paul Young and Ross Murray. In 2002, she directed the award-winning short animated film From Darkness. The short film has no dialogue and is based on an Inuit folk tale where a man helps a woman with only a skeleton for a body to regenerate. She also worked on the successful animated TV series Skunk Fu!.

Twomey went on to write and direct the animated short Cúilín Dualach (Backwards Boy), released in 2004. Based on a story by Jackie Mac Donacha, a boy with his head on backwards finds only love and acceptance in his mother and has to work to gain that from the rest of his community but most of all his father.

She co-directed, with Tomm Moore, The Secret of Kells, an animated feature film as well as doing additional voice acting for the film. The film is set in 9th century Ireland, at the time when the Book of Kells was written. In it, a 12 year old orphan boy living at a monastery has the task of finishing a book with the art of illumination. The film premiered at the Berlin International Film Festival in February 2009. The Secret of Kells was nominated in the category of Best Animated Feature Film at the 82nd Academy Awards.

Twomey continued to work on feature films with Cartoon Saloon with 2014's Song of the Sea directed by Tomm Moore. She worked as the film's head of story and voice director.

She next directed the animated film The Breadwinner, released in 2017. Based on the best-selling young adult novel by Deborah Ellis, an 11-year-old girl named Parvana must dress as a boy and become the titular breadwinner for her family when her father is wrongfully arrested by the Taliban. It premiered at the Toronto International Film Festival in September 2017 with a wide release in November 2017. It is the first feature-length film she has sole director credit on. She worked on the project with actress Angelina Jolie, who helped fund the project and worked as an executive producer The project was a huge success for Twomey, as she was recognized as a solo female filmmaker, and given accolades as well as being lauded by many as a source of female empowerment, all while battling cancer during production. During the development of The Breadwinner, Twomey was named in Variety's "2017 10 Animators to Watch".

Twomey is a member of the Motion Picture Academy.

== Themes and style ==
Twomey's films are often coming-of-age films with pre-teen protagonists dealing with mythic worlds, the importance of stories and finishing them, acceptance, family, and communities. Twomey's work also takes aim at the fact that life is a cycle of impermanence, and that life is always ever changing. Her depictions of this cycle vary in size and scope, an example of this being her depiction of Afghanistan in the breadwinner, which she describes as a land that has gone from progressive to oppressive in a matter of years, such is the cycle. Twomey follows a unique design perspective either using characters that are explained by their visual design, or characters whom character gives more to the overall design or her worlds. She tends to use simple yet effective character designs in order to be concise about delivery. Her films combine traditional and digital art but are often hand-drawn and in a visual style inspired by the worlds of her stories.

Twomey's work is tailored to be enjoyed by all audiences, even though her protagonist are typically children or young adults, the stories they star in are typically considered complex and multi-layered, lending them to potentially be enjoyable and meaningful for adults as well as young adults and children.she has stated that animation is an often overlooked medium particularly by adults, and something she believes to be pointless, as to her it is simply another way of telling stories that can be just as complex. Twomey particularly loves young adults as an audience, as she is able to provide them with vivid coming of age stories that attempt to depict and age where they are also coming to terms with reality, and she, unlike many filmmakers attempts to treat them with dignity by not softening the reality of her stories. Examples of this are seen in the Breadwinner which depicts the oppression, brutality, and hypocrisy of the Taliban in a post 9-11 world. Twomey does concede in an interview that she believes that her young adult and child portion of her audience may not have the same visceral reaction towards depictions of the Taliban as adults who have strong associations with them, however Twomey uses the " coming of age " trope with a child protagonist seeing many of these things for the first time, giving hem someone in the story that can cue how they should and would react to such situations. She believes that a young protagonist gives children a stepping stone into more adult themes, allowing for multi layered filmmaking.

Twomey's stories often deal with juxtaposition, combining the fantastical and ethereal with the realities of life, such as sexism and oppression. She attempts to make her real world depiction of Afghanistan dark, gritty and draped in realism, using brought on Afghan artist and witnesses in order to capture the culture and environment her film takes place in, conversely as half the film takes place in the titular characters mind, Twomey uses colorful geometric art based on Persian miniatures to contrast reality from imagination.

Twomey also weaves in smaller slice of life themes such as a child's, love for their parents, complex sibling dynamics, and femininity that are included to give more humanity to her characters.

In terms of style, Twomey is a huge proponent of the hero's journey and believes one should have a sound understanding of this narrative structure so they can work both within and outside of it, allowing for subversions or new interesting takes on the formula.

Twomey also makes the stylistic choice to stick to hand drawn 2D images despite the readily available, and cheaper 3D CGI available today, as she believes 2D can be more stylistic and withstands the test of time.

== Accolades ==
Nora Twomey became the seventh graduate of Ballyfermot College to have been nominated for an Academy Award with her work on The Breadwinner when it was nominated for Best Animated Feature at the 90th Academy Awards. She was also nominated for an award at the Golden Globes.

The Breadwinner earned ten nominations at the 45th Annie Awards, including Outstanding Achievement for Directing in an Animated Feature Production for Twomey. It won the award for best animated feature for an independent film. This marked the first time a sole female director directed the film that won the award. It also won the Cinema for Peace award for Justice in 2018.

Nora Twomey's work also had a heavy presence at the Emile Awards, an annual event held by the European Animation Association that honors European creators of animation. During the awards of 2018, which were hosted in Lile, France, Twomey's film The Breadwinner won awards in four categories: Best Direction, Best Storyboarding, Best Character Animation, Best Background, and Best Character Design.

Twomey has won several awards according to the SDGI (Screen Directors Guild of Ireland). These awards include the best New Irish Short Animation, Galway Film Fleadh, 2002, Best Short, Boston Irish Film Festival, USA 2003, Best Animation, Kerry film festival, Ireland 2003, and the Silver Award -KAFI Animation festival, USA 2003, for her film From Darkness. Her film Cúilín Dualach (Backwards Boy) also won the Best Animated Short, IFTA, Ireland 2005, Best short film, Cartoons on the Bay, Italy 2005, Best Animation for Children, Animadrid, 2005, and the Best Animation, Celtic Film Festival, 2005. Among other awards, the 2018 Cinema for Peace Award for Justice for her movie The Breadwinner can be included.

Cartoon Saloon, a studio Twomey co-founded with contemporaries Paul Young and Tom Moore in Kilkenny, Ireland, has been nominated for five Academy awards, a BAFTA award and several aforementioned Emmy's.

== Personal life ==
Twomey has two sons. During the making of The Breadwinner, she was diagnosed with cancer, which she has since recovered from.

== Filmography ==
=== Film ===
Year	Title	Director	Producer	Animation department	Voice actress	Role	Notes
2002	From Darkness	Yes	Yes	Yes	No		Short film Animator; Character designer Art director
2003	The 3 Wise Men	No	No	Yes	No		Animation supervisor Effect animator
2004	Backwards Boy	Yes	No	Yes	No		Short film Animator; Also screenwriter and production manager
2009	The Secret of Kells	Yes	No	No	Yes	Additional Voices	Co-director
2009	Old Fangs	No	No	Yes	No		Short film Creative director
2011	Escape of the Gingerbread Man!!!	No	No	No	Yes	Ms. Fox	Short film
2014	Song of the Sea	No	No	Yes	No		Head of story Voice director
2014	Somewhere Down the Line	No	No	No	Yes	Additional Voices	Short film
2017	The Breadwinner	Yes	No	No	No		
2020	Wolfwalkers	No	Yes	No	Yes	Additional Voices	
2022	My Father's Dragon	Yes	No	No	Yes	Additional Voices	
2025	Éiru	No	Yes	No	No	Producer	Short Film

=== Television ===
Year	Title	Producer	Notes
2015	Eddie of the Realms Eternal	Yes	TV movie
2015–present	Puffin Rock	Yes	Creative producer
