= Robert Walker (animator) =

Canadian animator

Robert Walker (1961 – April 1, 2015) was a Canadian-born American animator who co-directed the Academy Award-nominated Brother Bear with Aaron Blaise.

== Career ==
Walker was born in Toronto, Ontario, and raised in Ottawa, where he attended Gloucester High School. He had an older sister Sandra, and a younger brother, Jim. Walker studied animation at Sheridan College. Upon his graduation, he was hired by Atkinson Film-Arts and worked on the animated shows Dennis the Menace and The Raccoons. Walker joined Walt Disney Animation Studios at their Florida location in 1989. His first project with Disney was the Roger Rabbit short film Roller Coaster Rabbit. He also worked on The Rescuers Down Under (1990), Beauty and the Beast (1991), Aladdin (1992), The Lion King (1994), Mulan (1998), and Lilo & Stitch (2002). He died of a heart attack at his California home in 2015, aged 54.
