= The Mysterious Benedict Society (novel) =

2007 book by Trenton Lee Stewart

- Author: Trenton Lee Stewart
- Cover artist: Carson Ellis
- Language: English
- Series: The Mysterious Benedict Society
- Genre: Young adult
- Publisher: Little, Brown and Company
- Publication date: March 7, 2007
- Publication place: United States
- Pages: 485 pgs
- ISBN: 978-0-316-05777-6
- OCLC: 66392644
- LC Class: PZ7.S8513 My 2007
- Preceded by: The Extraordinary Education of Nicholas Benedict
- Followed by: The Mysterious Benedict Society and the Perilous Journey

The Mysterious Benedict Society is a novel written by Trenton Lee Stewart and illustrated by Carson Ellis, first published in 2007. It tells the story of four gifted children: Reynie Muldoon, George "Sticky" Washington, Kate Wetherall, and Constance Contraire, who together form the "Mysterious Benedict Society" and are sent to investigate an institution called L.I.V.E. (the Learning Institute for the Very Enlightened), run by a man named Ledroptha Curtain. The book is the first in a series that has sold over three million copies.

== Plot ==
Reynard “Reynie” Muldoon lives at an orphanage in the city of Stonetown with his tutor, Miss Perumal. Reynie notices a newspaper advertisement seeking gifted children, and takes part in a series of three odd and complex tests, all of which he passes. He meets three other children, all parentless and each gifted in their own way: George "Sticky" Washington, Kate Wetherall, and Constance Contraire. Mr. Benedict, the organizer of the tests, and his associates Number Two, Rhonda Kazembe, and the amnesiac Milligan, welcome them into their home.

Mr. Benedict explains that a mysterious threat plagues the world in the form of secret messages transmitted into people's minds via television and radio signals. The messages originate at the Learning Institute for the Very Enlightened (L.I.V.E.), a school on an island in Stonetown Harbor run by the famous scientist Ledroptha Curtain. Mr. Benedict invites the children to form a team to put a stop to the messages. The children agree and learn morse code to prepare for the mission. They name their team the Mysterious Benedict Society and enroll at the Institute, with Mr. Benedict and his associates communicating with them from the mainland shore.

The children learn that Mr. Curtain is Mr. Benedict’s long-lost twin brother. They are confused by the nonsensical lessons, but work together so that Reynie and Sticky become Messengers, the special students who send the secret messages. Through their investigations, the children discover that Mr. Curtain transmits his messages through a device known as the Whisperer, which is capable of "sweeping away" memories, and that he plans to boost his messages to transmit directly to people's brains. They also discover that he plans to use the Whisperer to conquer the world, and relay this message back to Mr. Benedict. Milligan comes to the island to take the Society to safety, but they choose to stay on the island to stop Mr. Curtain.

The children create a desperate plan to face off against Mr. Curtain with Milligan’s help, but Milligan lets himself be captured to draw suspicion away from them. While Sticky and Reynie are in Mr. Curtain's office, Kate and Constance break in. During the course of their attempt, Milligan escapes and arrives to assist. Mr. Curtain attempts to wipe their memories, but Constance manages to resist him and confuse the Whisperer. At the same time, Mr. Benedict and his team enter the Institute. Mr. Benedict disables the Whisperer and the Society escapes from the island. The Institute is raided by government agents and shut down, although Mr. Curtain manages to escape. Upon returning to Stonetown, the four children settle down and find families of their own; Reynie is adopted by Miss Perumal, Constance by Mr. Benedict, Sticky reunites with his estranged parents and Kate with Milligan, revealed to be her father.

== Characters ==
=== Main characters ===
- Reynard "Reynie" Muldoon is an eleven-year-old boy living at Stonetown Orphanage. He is talented at problem-solving, logical deduction, and perceiving people's emotions. His intelligence results in the assignment of a special tutor at the orphanage, Miss Perumal, who later adopts him. Reynie looks between the lines, observing and questioning, and solves most problems by looking for a "puzzle" within the situation. He is described as an especially average-looking boy with average brown hair, average pale complexion, and average clothes.
- George "Sticky" Washington, is an eleven-year-old, bald, tea-skinned boy. He has a great memory (everything "sticks" in his head, hence his nickname) and a talent for reading quickly. He is timid and nervous and resorts to polishing his glasses in stressful situations. He ran away from his parents because they forced him into academic competitions and when his nervousness caused him to fail at them, he thought they no longer wanted him around.
- Kate Wetherall is a twelve-year-old girl who is dexterous, strong, and cheerful. After being orphaned, she ran away to the circus. She has blonde hair, blue eyes, and fair skin. She carries a red bucket containing various items which she thinks are useful, including a swiss army knife, a flashlight, a pen light, a rope, a bag of marbles, a slingshot, a spool of clear fishing twine, a horseshoe magnet and a spyglass disguised as a kaleidoscope. Kate's mother died when she was a baby and she believes her father left her when she was young. She loves to call herself "the Great Kate Weather Machine". It was later revealed that Milligan was her father.
- Constance Contraire is a small, extremely intelligent, and stubborn girl. She has the ability to write clever and brutal poems, and her ultra-sensitive mind is most affected by the Whisperer. At the novel's end, she becomes Mr. Benedict's adopted daughter. It is revealed that she is only 2 years old, which explains all of her toddler-like behaviors. She tends to irritate the other members, but they aren't able to stay mad at her for long.
- Milligan is a former government agent and current guard for the children, Rhonda, Number Two, and Mr. Benedict. He is a sad and somber man, even described as a "scarecrow" due to his shabby and depressing demeanor. His sadness is attributed to his kidnapping by secret agents, after which he was brainwashed and lost his memory. Although unsure of his actual name, "Milligan" was the first word he remembered on regaining consciousness, and he adopted it as his name. He later recovers his memory and discovers he is Kate's father. Milligan also has flax blond hair and ocean blue eyes.
- Mr. Nicholas Benedict is a middle-aged man who recruits the children. He is the one who discovered the plans of his identical twin brother, Ledroptha Curtain, from whom he was separated just after birth because their parents had died. Mr. Benedict has narcolepsy, which causes him to fall asleep when experiencing strong emotions (usually laughter).
- Ledroptha Curtain is the antagonist of the story and the head of the "Learning Institute for the Very Enlightened", or L.I.V.E. and "The Emergency", which are his tools for creating mass panic and destabilizing the world's major governments. Mr. Curtain created the mind-control and mind-message transmitter device called "the Whisperer", which utilizes children's minds to spread propaganda and subliminal messages through television as part of a scheme to usurp control of the entire world and be declared "Minister And Secretary of all the Earth's Regions" (M.A.S.T.E.R.). He is also revealed to be Mr. Benedict's long-lost twin brother. He uses a modified wheelchair to get around and wears mirrored sunglasses in order to conceal his narcolepsy. Mr. Curtain's narcolepsy is triggered by anger, as a foil to his twin's laughter-induced narcolepsy.

=== Supporting characters ===
- S.Q. Pedalian is an Executive working for Mr. Curtain. He is dim-witted and clumsy but is the only Executive who is kind to the Mysterious Benedict Society. He is also somewhat oblivious to the evils of Mr. Curtain, the Institute, and the Whisperer's effects on the world's inhabitants.
- Jackson and Jillson are Executives at the Institute and are noted for their unkind ways. Jackson has icy blue eyes, is stockily built, and has a nose long and sharp like a knife. Jillson is six feet tall, has small piggy eyes, and "arms like a gorilla."
- Martina Crowe is originally a Messenger and later Executive at the Institute. She despises the members of the Mysterious Benedict Society because she feels threatened by their intelligence, but holds particular enmity for Kate.
- Miss Perumal is Reynie's tutor. She is Indian and is intelligent and friendly. She is the one who told Reynie that he should take a special test for gifted children, not knowing it was to recruit members for the Mysterious Benedict Society. She eventually adopts Reynie.
- Mr. Rutger is the Stonetown Orphanage director. Although not unkind, he is blinded by greed to Reynie's obvious higher educational needs. He gets paid for each student so he doesn't let Reynie go to an advanced school.
- The Helpers make food, do laundry, and perform other manual labor tasks at the Institute. They are not allowed to talk to any students at L.I.V.E. or make eye contact. They share the same vacant, sad expressions as Milligan, and Reynie soon discovers that the Helpers may have been brought to the Institute against their wills and have been brainwashed.
- The Recruiters kidnap children for the Institute, to be used for Mr. Curtain's Whisperer messages. In the following books The Mysterious Benedict Society and the Perilous Journey and The Mysterious Benedict Society and the Prisoner's Dilemma, they evolve into the Ten Men, so named for their ten ways of hurting people.
- Number Two and Rhonda Kazembe are the over-protective assistants of Mr. Benedict. They have passed all his tests, and now live with him and help him with his research into the Institute. Rhonda is a Zambian woman who makes a convincing 12-year-old in height even though she's in her twenties. Number Two is mostly noted for her resemblance of a pencil when wearing her yellow coat, with yellow skin and red hair. They are the adopted daughters of Mr. Benedict.

== Critical reception ==
The Mysterious Benedict Society has received generally positive reviews. Many critics praised the enigmatic plot and puzzles included in the storyline; journalist Michele Norris, writing for NPR, said, "Almost everything inside this book is an enigma." Additionally, the ethical decisions and moral lessons contained within the book were praised. Kirkus Reviews said that the book was "rich in moral and ethical issues." Rick Riordan, author of the Percy Jackson & the Olympians series, wrote, "I enjoyed it very much -- great cast of characters, lots of cool puzzles and mysteries. The book made me feel nostalgic, because it reminded me of some of the better children’s books I grew up with, like Charlie and the Chocolate Factory and The Phantom Tollbooth."

== Awards ==
The Mysterious Benedict Society was a New York Times bestseller in 2008 and won a 2007 Booklist Editors' Choice: Books for Youth award, a 2008 Notable Children's Book for Middle Readers award from the American Library Association, the 2008 E. B. White Read Aloud Award for Older Readers, and a 2008 Texas Lone Star Reading List award.

== Sequels ==
Three sequels were published in 2008, 2009, and 2019: The Mysterious Benedict Society and the Perilous Journey, The Mysterious Benedict Society and the Prisoner's Dilemma, and The Mysterious Benedict Society and the Riddle of Ages.

A prequel, The Extraordinary Education of Nicholas Benedict, was released on April 10, 2012.

A supplementary book, The Mysterious Benedict Society: Mr. Benedict's Book of Perplexing Puzzles, Elusive Enigmas, and Curious Conundrums, was also released.

== Television adaptation ==
In September 2019, it was announced that The Mysterious Benedict Society was being adapted into a television series of the same name on Hulu. The series debuted on Disney+ on June 25, 2021, with a two-episode premiere. The first season consisted of 8 episodes, and ran until August 6, 2021. On September 28, 2021, Disney+ renewed the series for a second season. On January 29, 2023, Disney+ canceled the series after two seasons.
