= The Mysterious Benedict Society and the Perilous Journey =

2008 novel by Trenton Lee Stewart

- Author: Trenton Lee Stewart
- Illustrator: Diana Sudyka
- Cover artist: Carson Ellis
- Language: English
- Series: The Mysterious Benedict Society
- Genre: Children's
- Publisher: Little, Brown
- Publication date: May 1, 2008
- Publication place: United States
- Pages: 503 pp
- ISBN: 978-0-316-05780-6
- OCLC: 171287572
- LC Class: PZ7.S8513 Mye 2008
- Preceded by: The Mysterious Benedict Society
- Followed by: The Mysterious Benedict Society and the Prisoner's Dilemma

The Mysterious Benedict Society and the Perilous Journey is a bestselling children's novel written by Trenton Lee Stewart and illustrated by Diana Sudyka, published in 2008. It is the second book in the series, following The Mysterious Benedict Society (2007).

== Plot ==
After the events of the previous book, Mr. Benedict, and the children's parents, plan to bring the children back together for another adventure using their teamwork, skills, and intelligence. When the children arrive at his house, they find out that Mr. Benedict was kidnapped by his evil twin, Mr. Curtain. In a letter, Mr. Curtain explains that he needs a certain rare plant and that a person extremely close to Mr. Benedict knows where to find it. He also says that Mr. Benedict and his assistant, Number Two, will be in danger if he doesn’t get this info. Rhonda, Mr. Benedict’s adopted daughter, soon reveals that Mr. Benedict gave her a letter for the children to open when they came. A series of riddles lead them to take the MV Shortcut, the fastest ship in the world, bound for Lisbon.

They sneak off to the ship, which is captained by Phil Noland, a friend and former navy colleague of Mr. Benedict, who has been expecting them. Noland tells them more about Mr. Benedict, including his recent communications. Noland gives them a two-way radio for communication, but Reynie mistrusts him and later disposes of it. They find new information, which leads them to a castle in Portugal. There, they find evidence that leads them to a science museum in Holland. At the museum, they learn that the rare plant is called duskwort, capable of inducing a spellbinding sleep, and might be extinct. It has the power to put an entire city to sleep and also has the power to cure narcolepsy, the disease that Mr. Benedict and his brother have.

They rest at a hotel that evening but are found by Mr. Curtain’s agents called Ten Men, then rescued by Milligan, Kate’s recently found father. They then go to the island that the library said had the last remaining duskwort. On the island, they find Number Two, who managed to escape, but is delirious from hunger. When Milligan tries to rescue Mr. Benedict, the children are attacked by the Ten Men. Milligan comes back and saves the children by fighting the Ten Men while the children escape. Later, they find Mr. Curtain, who tricks the children into also being captured. After Mr. Curtain leaves to run an errand, Mr. Benedict tricks S.Q., their guard, and they get away. The children escape, along with Mr. Benedict.

As they climb down the mountain, Mr. Benedict falls asleep due to his narcolepsy and the children carry him down the mountain. They soon find Milligan, who is extremely injured from the battle with the Ten Men, and after Mr. Benedict wakes up, they run to the bay and are surrounded by the Ten Men. Before they are recaptured, the Shortcut and its crew (who have already rescued Number Two) come to save them. Everyone runs into the security hold of the ship and try to hide from the Ten Men, but are found. Just as the Ten Men plant a bomb near the hold, the Royal Navy shows up. Kate throws away the bomb and Mr. Curtain escapes, but the children make it back home to their families.

== Characters ==
- Reynard "Reynie" Muldoon is an eleven-year-old with no parents to speak of. He lives with his former tutor who now is his adopted mother, Miss Perumal (or as he calls her, Amma), who is teaching him Tamil, and her mother, whom he calls Pati. He acts as a leader to the rest of the Mysterious Benedict Society. He is very gifted at finding the puzzles in things, much like Constance Contraire. He is also the one who devises most of the plans, and he considers himself alone, though he realizes that he finds happiness with the people who like him.
- George "Sticky" Washington is also an eleven-year-old boy. He is characterized by his intelligence and ability to remember everything he reads hears or sees—hence his nickname, for everything "sticks" in his mind. He strongly prefers this nickname to his given name, George Washington. Sticky ran away from his home after feeling that he is not wanted by his parents, but is now living in his home with his parents again. He has tea-colored skin and is bald because he used hair remover to disguise himself. Sticky also has a bad habit of polishing his spectacles whenever he gets nervous. Sticky also ran away because his brain needed a rest from contests that his parents entered him in for his intelligence. His family spent a fortune finding Sticky, leaving them very poor. In this book, Sticky is becoming more comfortable with his gifts.
- Kate Wetherall is an energetic twelve-year-old girl who lives with her father Milligan on a farm; her mother died when she was a young child. Kate has long blonde hair and ocean-blue eyes. Kate possesses unparalleled strength, speed, agility, and endurance, among other things. She can be considered the backbone or powerhouse of the four. Her many awkward-but-useful talents (such as regurgitating things) are very prized and prove to be pivotal for the welfare of the group. Whatever happens she still is as cheerful as anyone else in the group. Even in the hardest times she is still making jokes!
- Constance Contraire is the fourth child of the group. She is waiting to be adopted by Mr. Benedict. Though she at first does not appear to have any special abilities, her bravery and stubbornness ultimately prove to be a great asset. Constance can detect patterns in things, and though it may seem like she is psychic, Constance merely recognized patterns and unknowingly can predict the near future. She has wispy, light blonde hair and pale blue eyes. Constance is only three years old, which explains her frequent napping and obstinacy.
- Mr. Benedict is a little older-than-middle-age man who recruits the children that later call themselves the Mysterious Benedict Society. He is the one who discovered the plans of his twin brother, Ledroptha Curtain. He is the founder of the Mysterious Benedict Society and is the smartest of them all. He is afflicted with narcolepsy, and in this book seeks a cure; one that may help cure this disease.
- Mr. Curtain is Mr. Benedict's evil twin brother, who has kidnapped Mr. Benedict and Number Two in the attempt of taking over the world. He wears silver glasses and green plaid suits, and usually makes his way around in a motorized wheelchair. Like his brother, he has narcolepsy, but his condition is triggered by anger as opposed to laughter. His real name is Ledroptha.
- Rhonda Kazembe is Mr. Benedict's adopted daughter. She comes from Zambia. She is also, like Number Two (Shown Below), an assistant to Mr. Benedict, though she does sleep. She is quite beautiful, with very dark skin and coal-black hair. She has a very good memory, similar to Sticky's.
- Number Two is Mr. Benedict's assistant and adopted daughter. She almost never sleeps and takes sudden food breaks to keep her energy up. She is kidnapped along with Mr. Benedict in this book. Her real name is revealed to be Pencilla in the third book of the series, The Mysterious Benedict Society and the Prisoner's Dilemma.
- Milligan was a spy captured by Mr. Curtain. His name, “Milligan”, came from his last memory, a child (Kate) saying “Mill again?” hence his name, Milligan. Although his memories were erased by Mr. Curtain, he managed to escape and eventually became Mr. Benedict's bodyguard. However, near the end of the first book, when the four children are in danger and he desperately needs to save them, that triggers his memory and is revealed to be Kate's father. By the second book many of his physical abilities as a secret agent have been revealed, including being able to devise a lockpick from nail clippings, being able to bend metal bars, and being able to expertly handle his signature tranquilizer gun. As a desperate attempt to save Kate and the others, he jumped down a ravine. He survives the jump, but broke almost every bone in his body. He has blonde hair and ocean blue eyes just like Kate.
- The Ten Men are paid workers of Mr. Curtain who dress elegantly and carry briefcases that contains deadly weapons. They are called that way because they have ten different ways to hurt someone. Their names include McCracken, Crawlings, Sharpe, and Garotte. The weapons created by Mr. Curtain himself are to be in the possession of these men.

== Reception ==
In a starred review, School Library Journal described the book as "not just a rip-roaring adventure ... but also a warm and satisfying tale about friendship." Kirkus Reviews was less positive, saying that the book "may wear down less patient readers", citing the prose and needless elaborations in several areas. Horn Book Magazine disagreed, saying that "Stewart keeps interest high throughout". They especially praised the "first-rate brainteasers", with School Library Journal also commenting that it had "plenty of clever twists".

The beginning of the novel came in for particular criticism, with Horn Book Magazine complaining of "a few treacly initial scenes" and School Library Journal saying that "[t]he action takes a while to get going". However, comparing it overall to its predecessor, Horn Book Magazine felt that it was "a worthy successor" - although Kirkus Reviews said that it "has more of an air of trading on the previous one's cleverness than building on it."

== Sequels ==
A sequel for this book, and also the third book in the series, was published in 2009. The title is The Mysterious Benedict Society and the Prisoner's Dilemma. A fourth book, The Mysterious Benedict Society and the Riddle of Ages was published in 2019.

== Television adaptation ==
The novel served as the basis for the second season of the television series The Mysterious Benedict Society. Unlike the first season which stayed close to the basic outline of the original novel, the second season only roughly follows the first half of the book, while the second half completely diverges, resulting in the vast removal of characters and altering of major plot points.
