= The Mysterious Benedict Society =

Children's book series and franchise

- The Mysterious Benedict Society (2007); The Mysterious Benedict Society and the Perilous Journey (2008); The Mysterious Benedict Society and the Prisoner's Dilemma (2009); The Mysterious Benedict Society and the Riddle of Ages (2019)
- Author: Trenton Lee Stewart
- Illustrator: Carson Ellis (first book), Diana Sudyka (second, third, companion, prequel), Manuela Montoya Escobar (fourth book)
- Country: United States
- Language: English
- Publisher: Little, Brown, and Company
- Media type: Print
- No. of books: 4
- Website: www.mysteriousbenedictsociety.com

The Mysterious Benedict Society is a series of children's books by Trenton Lee Stewart chronicling the adventures of four children, gathered together by the eccentric Mr. Benedict. The children (Reynie Muldoon, Sticky Washington, Kate Wetherall, and Constance Contraire) work together to stop Ledroptha Curtain, Mr. Benedict's twin brother, from taking over the world.

The first children's novels written by Stewart, each of the first three books were published annually from 2007 to 2009, with the fourth installment following a decade later. A companion book was released in 2011, and a prequel novel detailing the backstory of Mr. Benedict was released in 2012. Disney adapted the first two books into the namesake television series.

== Books ==
=== The Mysterious Benedict Society ===
The Mysterious Benedict Society is the first installment in the series and was released on March 7, 2007.

In the book, four gifted young orphans (Reynie Muldoon, Sticky Washington, Kate Wetherall, and Constance Contraire), are recruited by the strange Nicholas Benedict and his associates, Number Two, Rhonda Kazembe, and Milligan to investigate secret messages being broadcast by the famous scientist Ledroptha Curtain from his school. The children name their team the Mysterious Benedict Society and enroll at Mr. Curtain's school, with Mr. Benedict communicating with them via Morse code. The Society learn that Mr. Curtain is Mr. Benedict's long-lost twin brother. Through their investigations, they learn that he has a machine called the Whisperer, capable of manipulation, mind control, and the deletion of memories. Mr. Benedict sends Milligan to pick the children up from the island, but they decide to stay to stop Mr. Curtain. The four children create a plan to face off against him with Milligan's help, but he is captured. He manages to escape; together they stop Mr. Curtain before he is able to use his machine at full power. with the help of Mr. Benedict. However, Mr. Curtain escapes the island with his henchmen.

=== The Mysterious Benedict Society and the Perilous Journey ===
The Perilous Journey is the second installment of the series and was released on May 1, 2008.

In The Perilous Journey, the Mysterious Benedict Society reassemble for a puzzle organized by Mr. Benedict. However, he and Number Two are kidnapped by Mr. Curtain, who demands that they find a rare plant for him. The Society sneaks onto the MV Shortcut, captained by Mr. Benedict's friend Phil Noland and travel to Europe. A series of clues lead them to a museum in Holland, where they discover that the plant, called duskwort, has the power to put entire cities to sleep and cure narcolepsy, a condition which Mr. Benedict and his brother have. The children go to the island containing the last duskwort and are captured trying to rescue Mr. Benedict. They manage to escape with the help of Noland, but Mr. Curtain escapes again.

=== The Mysterious Benedict Society and the Prisoner's Dilemma ===
The Prisoner's Dilemma is the third installment of the series, released on October 6, 2009.

=== The Extraordinary Education of Nicholas Benedict ===
The Extraordinary Education of Nicholas Benedict is a prequel novel published on April 10, 2012.

=== The Mysterious Benedict Society and the Riddle of Ages ===
The Riddle of Ages is the fourth installment of the series and was released on September 24, 2019.

== Supporting works ==
In 2016, Stewart published a companion book featuring a collection of puzzles and riddles titled Mr. Benedict's Book of Perplexing Puzzles, Elusive Enigmas, and Curious Conundrums.

== Characters ==
- Reynie Muldoon is the main character of the series; an average-looking but logical boy who is a natural leader of his friend group. The core three texts follow Reynie closely. Reynie is an orphan; Ms. Perumal serves as his teacher and tutor during his time in the orphanage, and later adopts him as her son. Mystic Inscho portrays Reynie in the television series adaptation.
- George "Sticky" Washington is an extraordinarily smart boy with an eidetic memory, meaning he can remember everything he sets his eyes on, leading to his nickname (everything sticks in his head). Seth Carr portrays Sticky in the television series adaptation.
- Kate Wetherall is an athletic and adventurous girl who never goes anywhere without her red bucket of tools, which she uses quite often. She is also able to determine any distance of any room. Emmy De Oliveira portrays Kate in the television series adaptation.
- Constance Contraire is a young girl who is incredibly stubborn and can read people's minds and (later) send mental messages to people. Marta Kessler portrays Constance in the television series adaptation.

== Television adaptation ==
Written by Matt Manfredi and Phil Hay, with Tony Hale cast as Mister Benedict and Mister Curtain, the series aired on Disney+ and Disney Channel, with the first of eight episodes premiering June 25, 2021. Additional cast members include Kristen Schaal as Number Two, MaameYaa Boafo as Rhonda Kazembe, Ryan Hurst as Milligan, Gia Sandhu as Ms. Perumal, Mystic Inscho as Reynie Muldoon, Seth Carr as Sticky Washington, Emmy DeOliveira as Kate Wetherall, and Marta Kessler as Constance Contraire. The series creators have suggested any subsequent season would mix elements from multiple novels, rather than adapt each book as its own season.

== Reception ==
The series has sold over three million copies. Many critics praised the enigmatic plot and puzzles included in the storyline of The Mysterious Benedict Society; journalist Michele Norris, writing for NPR, said, "Almost everything inside this book is an enigma." Additionally, the ethical decisions and moral lessons contained within the book were praised. Kirkus Reviews said that the book was "rich in moral and ethical issues." In a starred review for The Mysterious Benedict Society and the Perilous Journey, School Library Journal described the book as "not just a rip-roaring adventure ... but also a warm and satisfying tale about friendship." Kirkus Reviews was less positive, saying that the book "may wear down less patient readers", citing the prose and needless elaborations in several areas. Horn Book Magazine disagreed, saying that "Stewart keeps interest high throughout". They especially praised the "first-rate brainteasers", with School Library Journal also commenting that it had "plenty of clever twists".

For The Mysterious Benedict Society and the Prisoner's Dilemma, Booklist stated "Displaying much of the charm of the first book, this would make a fitting end to the series, but the Society's legion of fans probably wouldn't say no to more." while the School Library Journal wrote "the story lacks the facile agility of its predecessors. On the other hand, the opening gambit is fresh and frightfully funny ... If this is the last Society installment, readers had better, as Reynie says, 'acquire a taste for the bittersweet.'" Kirkus Reviews called the book The Mysterious Benedict Society and the Riddle of Ages "Clever as ever—if slow off the mark—and positively laden with tics, quirks, and puns." The American Booksellers Association named Riddle of Ages one of their ABC Best Books for Young Readers in 2019.
