= The Breadwinner (2017 film) =

Adult animated drama film by Nora Twomey

- Theatrical release poster
- Directed by: Nora Twomey
- Screenplay by: Anita Doron; Deborah Ellis
- Based on: The Breadwinner by Deborah Ellis
- Produced by: Anthony Leo; Tomm Moore; Andrew Rosen; Paul Young; Stephan Roelants
- Starring: Saara Chaudry; Soma Bhatia; Ali Badshah; Noorin Gulamgaus; Kane Mahon; Laara Sadiq; Kanza Feris; Shaista Latif; Kawa Ada; Ali Kazmi; Reza Sholeh
- Cinematography: Sheldon Lisoy
- Edited by: Darragh Byrne
- Music by: Mychael Danna; Jeff Danna
- Production companies: Cartoon Saloon; Aircraft Pictures; Guru Studio; Jolie Pas; Melusine Productions
- Distributed by: Elevation Pictures; (Canada); StudioCanal; (United Kingdom and Ireland)
- Release dates: September 8, 2017 (TIFF); November 17, 2017 (United States)
- Running time: 94 minutes
- Countries: Canada; Ireland; Luxembourg
- Language: English
- Budget: $1 million
- Box office: $4.4 million

The Breadwinner is a 2017 animated drama film directed by Nora Twomey, and written by Anita Doron and Deborah Ellis, based on the 2001 novel by Ellis. The film was an international co-production between Canada, the Republic of Ireland and Luxembourg.

The film had its world premiere at the 2017 Toronto International Film Festival on 8 September 2017 and received a limited release on 17 November. It received positive reviews from critics and received a nomination for Best Animated Feature at the 90th Academy Awards.

== Plot ==
In 2001, Parvana is an eleven-year-old girl who lives in Kabul under the Taliban's Islamic Emirate of Afghanistan just as the war on terror is beginning. Her father, Nurullah, is a former school teacher who became a hawker after losing his left leg in the Soviet–Afghan War. One day, Idrees, a young and volatile Taliban man who was a former student of Nurullah, has him unjustly arrested over a perceived insult in the market. Because the Taliban forbids women from going out without a male relative, Parvana's family is left without support, as her elder brother Sulayman died years ago, leaving her, her mother Fattema, her elder sister Soraya, and her youngest infant brother Zaki. When Parvana and Fattema try to go to the prison to appeal Nurullah's arrest, a man beats Fattema after she shows him a photograph of Nurullah and threatens to arrest them if they go outside again. Parvana comforts Zaki by telling the story of a boy on a quest to retrieve his village's seeds from an evil elephant named the Elephant King.

Later, Parvana tries to buy food for her family, but the hawkers cannot sell her any due to fear of the Taliban. A few men spot Parvana and chase her, and she drops the bag Fattema gave her while running. Parvana eventually makes it back home. To support her family, she decides to cut her hair and dress as a boy. She starts calling herself "Atesh", claiming to be Nurullah's nephew. The plan works, and Parvana is able to get both food and money. On the advice of a friend named Shauzia, who is another young girl disguised as a boy called Delowar, Parvana tries to bribe a prison guard so she can see Nurullah, but the guard sends her away, and so she works to save up more money for a larger bribe, taking on hard labor jobs with Shauzia, who is trying to save enough money to escape her abusive father. Meanwhile, Fattema is forced to write to a relative in Mazar, arranging marriage for Soraya in exchange for shelter and protection. Parvana also meets Razaq, the former patrol partner of Idrees; the illiterate Razaq pays her to read him a letter informing him that his wife was killed by a land mine. He befriends her and continues to meet with her so that she can teach him how to read and write.

Parvana and Shauzia take a hard labor job where Idrees is also present. He mocks their weakness when Shauzia rests, and shoves Parvana onto the ground. When Idrees recognizes her, Parvana quickly strikes him with a brick, and she flees with Shauzia as Idrees pursues them with a rifle. Parvana and Shauzia manage to hide, and Idrees is abruptly called away to fight in the United States invasion of Afghanistan. When Parvana returns home, Fattema pleads with her to stop the dangerous plot, telling her that her relatives accepted Soraya and that they will be collected the day after next. Parvana agrees on the condition that she gets to visit Nurullah in prison to tell him where they are going, as Razaq has a cousin who works there that will let her in. She tearfully bids farewell to Shauzia, promising that they will meet each other again sometime in the future, which she predicts will be in exactly twenty years. However, as Parvana travels to the prison, Fattema's cousin arrives early and forces them to come with him without Parvana, as the war is starting and the roads will soon be blocked. When his car is stalled for a repair, Fattema refuses to let him take them further, and her unyielding resolve pushes him to abandon the family, leaving them stranded.

Parvana arrives at the prison, where she finds Razaq. After Parvana reveals that she is Nurullah's daughter, Razaq informs her that his cousin has left to fight, but he will retrieve Nurullah. Parvana witnesses the execution of weak prisoners who are unable to fight. Terrified, she gathers her courage to stay by finishing the tale of the boy, who she turns into Sulayman, revealing that he died after picking up a a land mine, mistaking it for a toy. Razaq is shot while rescuing the weak Nurullah, but manages to reunite the two. Parvana takes Nurullah away, where they soon reunite with the rest of the family.

== Voice cast ==
- Saara Chaudry as Parvana / Atesh
- Soma Bhatia as Shauzia / Delowar
- Ali Badshah as Nurullah
- Noorin Gulamgaus as Idrees and Sulayman
- Kane Mahon as Kiln Owner
- Laara Sadiq as Fattema
- Shaista Latif as Soraya
- Kanza Feris as Sorceress / Woman in Courtyard
- Kawa Ada as Razaq
- Ali Kazmi as Darya / Fruit Juice Vendor / Jail Warden
- Mran Volkhard as Mega Phone / Market Seller
- Reza Sholeh as Stall Seller / Fruit Seller / Guard Man On Bike / Teenage Boy #2

== Production ==
In May 2016, it was announced that key animation for the film had commenced. The Breadwinner was a co-production between Aircraft Pictures in Canada, Melusine Productions in Luxembourg, and Cartoon Saloon in Ireland.

The Breadwinner was executive produced by Angelina Jolie, who worked with director Nora Twomey to bring the novel to the screen. Twomey is an Irish animator, director, screenwriter, producer and voice actress. She is also a founding partner in Cartoon Saloon, an Irish animation studio based in Kilkenny that did the key animation for The Breadwinner. Twomey commented on the serious theme in her animation film, saying: "I think that animation is very broad... so I don't see why it needs to be thought of as just a babysitting device... I wanted to go for the same audience that Deborah had gone for — young adults and adults as well. The film doesn't really talk down to anyone."

In a 2018 interview with Twomey, she revealed that Angelina Jolie was involved in the casting of the voice actors, in particular the Canadian talent Saara Chaudry who voices Parvana; Twomey recalled: "She [Chaudry] has such empathy, intellect and emotional depth, a unique talent for an 11 year old actor." Chaudry's personality also played a role in shaping Parvana's mannerisms, as Twomey explains in another interview, “Seeing what Saara was able to comprehend as an actor, as an artist, and as a child gave me an understanding of how to craft our film [in a way] that doesn't take for granted what children are afraid of or not afraid of.”

Twomey also explained that Jolie's insight as UN Goodwill ambassador at Afghan girls' schools was helpful in making the film, as she reportedly offered advice on the intricacies of Afghan behavior codes and the cultural atmosphere of Afghanistan. Mimi Polk Gitlin, producer of the feminist classic Thelma and Louise, was also involved as an executive producer.

Twomey also explained that she was careful to cast voice actors of Afghan heritage and to work with an Afghan dialect coach. She said: “there was so much input from people there at the time, to make sure it was not judgemental but also empathetic”. The Kabul-born dialect coach, Kawa Abu, also voices the character of Razaq. According to Twomey, the story-within-a-story about the mythical Elephant king was inspired by Guillermo Del Toro's Pan's Labyrinth. The texture and depth of the vivid fairy-tale fable and distinctive cut-out look was created using Nuke compositing software, from the Toronto-based Guru Studio.

During the development of the screenplay, screenwriter Anita Doron worked together with the American-Afghan artist Aman Mojadidi, to balance an Afghan perspective with a global perspective to capture the universal tone of the film. The first draft of the screenplay also saw contributions from the Afghan Women's Organization, as various Afghan refugees from different regions and tribes offered their perspectives and deepened the film's understanding of the Afghan culture.

School children along with their parents were invited for an early screening of the film, as Twomey noted that parents became emotional and teary whereas children, taking note from Parvana, were cheerful and chatty.

== Music ==
The film's music is composed by the brothers Mychael and Jeff Danna. Its palette of timbres sways between the austere, to underscore the real life sequences, and the more colorful to illustrate the parallel fantasy story. Performers include a young girls choir whose participation was arranged through the Afghanistan National Institute of Music.

== Reception ==
=== Box office ===
The film earned $17,395 its opening weekend in North America.

As of August 17, 2018, The Breadwinner has grossed $313,381 in the United States and Canada, and $2,954,368 internationally for a worldwide total of $3,266,749.

=== Critical response ===
On review aggregation website Rotten Tomatoes, the film has an approval rating of 95% based on 106 reviews, with an average rating of 7.9/10. The website's critical consensus reads: "The Breadwinner's stunning visuals are matched by a story that dares to confront sobering real-life issues with uncommon—and richly rewarding—honesty." On Metacritic, which assigns a normalized rating to reviews, the film has a score of 78 out of 100 based on reviews from 20 critics, indicating "generally favorable reviews".

Kenneth Turan of the Los Angeles Times gave the film a positive review, writing: "...The Breadwinner reminds us yet again that the best of animation takes us anywhere at any time and makes us believe." Mark Kermode, writing for The Guardian, gave the film 5/5 stars, writing: "Along with the eerie beauty of the animation there is a salving streak of humour that softens this tale's sharper edges, reminding us that – for children – laughter and bravery walk hand in hand." The review also compares the defiant feminist spirit of The Breadwinner to that of the 2007 French-Iranian animation film Persepolis. Furthermore, the music by Mychael and Jeff Danna was described as "lyrical and expressive", for evoking elements of Eastern culture and the enchanted story world. The director, Nora Twomey, was praised as the "real heroine of the story" for her directorial debut.

The New York Times selected The Breadwinner as its NYT Critic's pick and further praising Twomey for her "nuanced way with characterization and action". The voice cast, in particular Saara Chaudry who voices Parvana, was described as "terrific".

Variety's Peter Debruge compares Parvana's vivid emerald eyes to those of the Afghan girl on the June 1985 cover of National Geographic, explaining that both characters' eyes challenge viewers with their defiance and how "her [Parvana's] spirit burns every bit as strongly". Though the storyline is criticized for its rushed ending, the review praises its palette and musical score, and also recognizes The Breadwinner as "nothing short of exceptional, celebrating as it does a young woman who faces adversity head-on and who relies on her own creativity, both as a storyteller and in practical situations, to adapt to whatever obstacles she faces."

Vanessa H. Larson of The Washington Post gave the film three and a half out of four stars, praising the animation, for the realistic portrayal of characters as well as cultural setting of Kabul, while criticizing the story for being difficult to follow at times.

The deputy country director of Canadian Women for Women in Afghanistan, Abdul Rahim Ahmad Parwani, said: "After the movie was over and the lights were turned back on, I saw tears in the eyes of many Afghans. I couldn't stop my own tears," as he explains that many Afghans connected strongly with The Breadwinner. Another Afghan activist, Mina Sharifi, who is the director of Sisters4Sisters - a mentorship program for Afghan girls, also expresses her appreciation for the film's eye for detail; she said: "The clothing, the food, the family atmosphere, even the cane that the grandfather carried was carved and looked just like it was from here, I haven't seen another film on Afghanistan that takes the time to do that."

=== Accolades ===
The film has received ten Annie Award nominations, winning Best Independent Animated Feature and lost all nominations to Coco.

Award	Date of ceremony	Category	Recipients	Result	Ref.
Academy Awards	4 March 2018	Best Animated Feature	Nora Twomey and Anthony Leo	Nominated	
Annie Awards	3 February 2018	Best Animated Feature — Independent	The Breadwinner	Won	
Annie Awards	3 February 2018	Character Design in an Animated Feature Production	Reza Riahi, Louise Bagnall, Alice Dieudonné	Nominated	
Annie Awards	3 February 2018	Directing in an Animated Feature Production	Nora Twomey	Nominated	
Annie Awards	3 February 2018	Music in an Animated Feature Production	Mychael Danna, Jeff Danna	Nominated	
Annie Awards	3 February 2018	Production Design in an Animated Feature Production	Ciaran Duffy, Julien Regnard, Daby Zainab Faidhi	Nominated	
Annie Awards	3 February 2018	Storyboarding in an Animated Feature Production	Julien Regnard	Nominated	
Annie Awards	3 February 2018	Voice Acting in an Animated Feature Production	Saara Chaudry	Nominated	
Annie Awards	3 February 2018	Voice Acting in an Animated Feature Production	Laara Sadiq	Nominated	
Annie Awards	3 February 2018	Writing in an Animated Feature Production	Anita Doron	Nominated	
Annie Awards	3 February 2018	Editorial in an Animated Feature Production	Darragh Byrne	Nominated	
Canadian Screen Awards	11 March 2018	Best Picture	Andrew Rosen, Anthony Leo, Paul Young, Tomm Moore, Stéphan Roelants	Nominated	
Canadian Screen Awards	11 March 2018	Best Adapted Screenplay	Anita Doron	Won	
Canadian Screen Awards	11 March 2018	Best Editing	Darragh Byrne	Nominated	
Canadian Screen Awards	11 March 2018	Best Sound Editing	Nelson Ferreira, John Elliot, J. R. Fountain, Dashen Naidoo, Tyler Whitham	Won	
Canadian Screen Awards	11 March 2018	Best Original Score	Mychael Danna, Jeff Danna	Won	
Canadian Screen Awards	11 March 2018	Best Original Song	"The Crown Sleeps", Qais Essar and Joshua Hill	Won	
Cinema for Peace Awards	2018	Cinema for Peace Award for Justice	Nora Twomey	Won	
Critics' Choice Movie Awards	11 January 2018	Best Animated Feature	The Breadwinner	Nominated	
Golden Globe Awards	7 January 2018	Best Animated Feature Film	The Breadwinner	Nominated	
Golden Tomato Awards	3 January 2018	Best Animated Movie 2017	The Breadwinner	4th Place	
Irish Animation Awards	23 March 2019	Best Irish Feature Film or Special	The Breadwinner	Won	
Los Angeles Film Critics Association	13 January 2018	Best Animated Film	The Breadwinner	Won	
Washington D.C. Area Film Critics Association	8 December 2017	Best Animated Feature	The Breadwinner	Nominated	

== See also ==
- Osama, a 2003 film with a similar premise.
- Persepolis
- The Breadwinner (novel)
