= Kawa Ada =

Afghan-Canadian actor (born 1982)

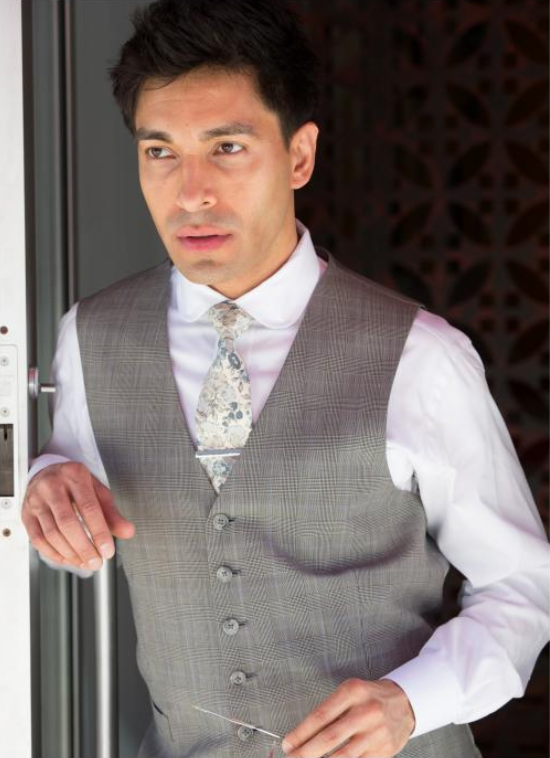
- Ada modelling for Kovalum's spring-summer 2014 collection
- Born: Kawa Ada; June 12, 1980 (age 46); Kabul, Afghanistan
- Education: Boston Conservatory (BFA)
- Occupations: Actor, writer, producer
- Years active: 2004–present
- Works: The Breadwinner, Jihad Gigolo, The Wanderers
- Awards: Dora Mavor Moore Award, Toronto Theatre Critics Award

Kawa Ada (born June 12, 1980) is an Afghan-Canadian actor, writer and producer. He distinguished himself as a stage actor on Broadway and in Toronto before pursuing a career as a film and television actor and a writer. He is also a dancer, a choreographer, a keynote speaker and a voice actor, most recently known for playing Razaq in The Breadwinner.

== Early life ==
Ada was born on June 12, 1980, in Kabul, Afghanistan, in a Dari-speaking family belonging to the Pashtun aristocracy. His father was a famous national chess champion. In the midst of the Soviet–Afghan War, when Ada was a young child, his family was forced to flee the country. They entered Pakistan as refugees, from where they emigrated to India. His sister Blanesta Ada was then born on May 17, 1983. Growing up there, Ada dreamed of becoming a Bollywood movie star. The family then illegally moved to Switzerland, where his father was arrested and detained. When Ada was 8 years old, his family finally emigrated to Canada, where they settled in Toronto. In school, he was very much involved in student life, and has described his high-school self as a nerd.

Ada pursued his higher education in the United-States, where he graduated as valedictorian from the Boston Conservatory with a BFA in Theatre.

== Career ==
After graduating from the Boston Conservatory, Ada was immediately cast on Broadway in Bombay Dreams. He then acted in plays such as Troilus and Cressida. In parallel to this work, Ada came up with an original text based on his personal experiences during the Soviet invasion of his home-country, his difficult journey to relocate and integrate into Western culture and the hurdles of being an Afghan in America following the September 11 attacks. This piece, The Canny Afghani, premiered at the Boston Center for the Arts in 2004 as Ada's first one-man show. He would explain that:

"After September 11th, my skin colour and facial features suddenly attracted attention to myself and those around me – I was living in America with an Afghan face [...] All my endeavors as an artist soon took on a broader scope; this show not only brings my hopes of sharing the story of my family's journey to light, but also gives a tiny voice to the plight of those who have had to flee the countries they call home."

Back in Canada, Ada made a name for himself during three seasons of the Shaw Festival, along with parts in productions of The Grand, Canadian Stage and Cahoots Theatre. His performances were appreciated and earned him The Shaw Festival Outstanding Newcomer award in 2007 and the Stage West – Equity Emerging Theatre Artist Award the next year. His subsequent role in Paper SERIES drew further attention and earned him a nomination for a Dora Award. After that, he was cast as a lead in My Granny the Goldfish, after which he was consistently given leading parts. Eventually, he would even be established enough as an actor that he did not have to audition anymore.

In 2014, Ada wrote his second play, The Wanderers, which combines comedy, kinky sex, suicide, ghosts, hysteria, nudity and religious imagery, on the backdrop of an otherwise timeless tale of father-son conflict. Although the production of the play by Cahoots Theatre garnered mixed reviews, the text would go on to be studied in universities. The same year, Ada released his first short film, Jihad Gigolo, which he wrote, produced and starred in: the story of a young man who makes ends meet by dressing up as a "terrorist call boy" to fulfill the weird fantasies of his clients, until his girlfriend and the Secret Service find out. The movie premiered at the ReelWorld Film Festival where it was received well.

The next year, Ada was highly praised for his part in Accidental Death of an Anarchist. Theatre critic Amanda Campbell declared that "Kawa Ada, as the Madman, is a breathtaking tour de force, bursting with energy and words and playful shenanigans that cascade out of him with breakneck speed and formidable urgency.", while Robert Crew of The Star wrote: "Kawa Ada is a marvel in the role. He swaggers, skips, hops into someone’s lap, overacts to the hilt, mugs and wows the audiences with a smile that could melt a Newfoundland iceberg." The performance earned him a Dora award, and he was named NOW Magazine's Toronto's Best Male Actor. This success was immediately followed, the same year, by another noted performance in Bombay Black. In this play, Ada was cast as Aspara, a young female dancer who makes a living by dancing for men in private. At first, he was reticent to "take away" a role written for a woman, but he was convinced to take on the challenge as an opportunity to question gender in a patriarchal society. He choreographed himself the dances, which were deemed "enchanting" and "impossibly ethereal". The hard work that went into Ada's interpretation of Aspara was praised, eventually earning him the Toronto Theatre Critics Award for Best Male Actor of the Year. In a radio interview, he explained his artistic approach thusly:

"For me it was really important to honour playing a woman, and that I wasn't just playing at it. So I didn't want to wear a dress, I didn't want to wear make-up. So that's the other thing we're inviting the audience to do: I'm in very androgynous costume, and we're asking the audience to imagine that I'm a woman simply through my "acting ability". And so we'll see if it's successful or not, but the other thing was immense research (which is what I would do for any role), but this entailed talking to a lot of women, South-Asian women friends, about what it is to be a woman. [...] What was challenging was truly getting into my feminine side and accepting it, and it brought about a lot of the turmoil that I had in my own coming to terms with sexuality."

In December 2016, Ada suffered a leg fracture, which kept him off-stage for some time and put a definitive end to his dancing career. Nevertheless, his work as a playwright and director continued, and in January 2017 he presented The Death of Mrs. Gandhi and the Beginning of New Physics (A Political Fantasy). In this satiric fusion of feminism and politics, four powerful women – Margaret Thatcher, Imelda Marcos, Benazir Bhutto and Kim Campbell – gather for Indira Gandhi's funeral, but are hijacked by a time-travelling terrorist.

In 2017, Ada lent his voice to Razaq in the animated feature film The Breadwinner, based on the best-selling novel by Deborah Ellis, which had its world premiere at the 2017 Toronto International Film Festival. In addition to his voice performance, Ada was a dialect and accent coach to his fellow actors on set.

As of 2018, Ada is a playwright in residence at Tarragon Theatre, where he is working on his next play, Finding Islam, the story of a mother investigating the disappearance of her son, who is suspected to have joined ISIS. During this time he has also taught as an acting professor at the George Brown Theatre School.

== Other careers ==
In parallel to his stage career, Ada has also worked in higher education administration. He has notably worked in the department of Student Community and Leadership Development at York University. As of 2019, he was working at the Student Housing and Hospitality Services at the University of British Columbia, first as a Residence Life Manager, before being promoted to Associate Director. As part of this position, he notably launched a podcast on leadership, titled "Are you being served?"

In 2023 and 2024, Ada has been appointed to serve on the Renters Advisory Committee, a consultative body of the City of Vancouver tasked with advising the city council on strategic priorities relating to renters, to monitor and respond to the impacts of provincial and federal legislation affecting tenants and to advise the council on enhancing access and inclusion for renters in developing Vancouver policy and civic life.

Ada is also a national keynote speaker on issues of diversity, inclusion and motivation. This work as a promoteur of values of diversity and empowerment has also influenced his approach to acting. When talking about the production of David French's famously Newfoundland-rooted play Salt-Water Moon with actors that were not typical Newfoundlanders, Ada explained:

"We wanted to challenge ourselves to see if the audience could come on this journey with us and imagine all of this, this deep complex, love between these two people [...] It's one of the things I speak to all over the country. Colour blind is a term I don't use. We want to see people in all their colours."

Similarly, in a group interview following the presentation of The Breadwinner at the Toronto International Film Festival, Ada stressed the political importance of the film:

"[...]You have women and girls at the helm of this film. And in Afghanistan and in so many places in the world, where there is such strife, where there is such divisiveness, it is going to be us uplifting and allowing for girls and women in those parts of the world to continue to have a voice. That is the future of our world. And that is what this movie does."

== Personal life ==
Ada is fluent in Dari and English, and also knows Hindi and French. Ada identifies as queer.

He is a Trekkie, especially fond of Star Trek: The Next Generation, and used to collect unopened Star Trek figurines.

His goddaughter is also an actress. He met her at Factory Theatre, where Ada has been a mentor to younger actors, and the two of them would eventually star together in A Christmas Carol.

== Filmography, stage and other works ==
=== Film ===
Year	Title	Role	Notes
2017	The Breadwinner	Razaq (voice)	Ada also acted as a dialect and accent coach to the other actors
2014	Jihad Gigolo	Jovid	Comedy written and produced by Ada himself

=== Television ===
Year	Title	Role
2016	Shoot the Messenger	Raj Chaudhuri
2013	The Listener	Harlan Abbott
2011	Combat Hospital	ANA Office No. 4
2006	The State Within	Young Asian Male
2005	Mayday	Translator

=== Writing ===
Year	Title
2018	Finding Islam
2017	The Death of Mrs. Gandhi and the Beginning of New Physics (A Political Fantasy)
2014	The Wanderers
2004	The Canny Afghani

=== Theatre ===
Year	Title	Role	Company
2019	Copenhagen	Werner Heisenberg	Soulpepper
2019	Kiss of the Spider Woman	Molina	Eclipse Theatre Company
2017	A Christmas Carol	Fred / Young Ebenezer Scrooge	Soulpepper
2016	Salt-Water Moon	Jacob Mercer	Mirvish
2016	The Enchanted Loom	Kanan / Kavalan	Mirvish
2016	Incident at Vichy	Monceau	Soulpepper
2016	The 39 Steps	Richard Hannay	Soulpepper
2015	Bombay Black	Aspara	Factory Theatre
2015	Accidental Death of an Anarchist	Madman	Soulpepper
2015	Much Ado About Nothing	Don Pedro	Tarragon Theatre
2014	Hackerlove	Chelsea Manning	Buddies in Bad Times
2014	The Wanderers	Aman / Roshan	Cahoots Theatre Company
2013	Iceland	Halim	Factory Theatre
2013	Carried Away on the Crest of a Wave	Swimmer / Ma'mar	Tarragon Theatre
2012	My Granny The Goldfish	Nico	Factory Theatre
2011	Paper SERIES	Isaac	Cahoots Theatre Company
2009	The Wizard of Oz	Professor Marvel / The Wizard	The Grand
2009	Sunday in the Park With George	Soldier / Alex	Royal George, Shaw Festival
2009	Red Peppers & Shadow Play	Alf / Young Man	Royal George, Shaw Festival
2008	It's A Wonderful Life	Eddie Biggs	Canadian Stage
2008	After the Dance	Lawrence	Royal George, Shaw Festival
2008	Wonderful Town	Greenwich Villager	Festival Theatre, Shaw Festival
2007	Summer and Smoke	Dusty / Vernon	Royal George, Shaw Festival
2007	Mary's Wedding	Charlie	The Grand Theatre
2007	Comedy of Errors	Balthazar / Officer	Canadian Stage
2007	Mack and Mabel	Charlie Chaplin	Festival Theatre, Shaw Festival
2004	The Canny Afghani	Canny Afghani	Boston Center for the Arts
2004	Troilus And Cressida	Troilus	The Publick Theatre
2004	Bombay Dreams	Featured Ensemble	Broadway

== Awards ==
Year	Nominee / work	Award	Result
2019	Kiss of the Spider Woman	Dora Mavor Moore Award for Outstanding Performance in a Leading Role	Nominated
2016	Bombay Black	Toronto Theatre Critics Award – Best Male Actor of the Year	Won
2015	Kawa Ada	NOW Magazine's Toronto's Best Male Actor	Won
2015	Accidental Death of an Anarchist	Dora Mavor Moore Award for Outstanding Male Performance	Won
2014	The Wanderers	Broadway World Toronto Award for Best Leading Actor	Nominated
2013	Iceland	Broadway World Awards for Best Leading Actor	Nominated
2013	Kawa Ada	NOW Magazine's Toronto's Best Male Actor	Nominated
2012	My Granny The Goldfish	National Post – Robert Cushman's Year's Best Performances	Won
2011	Paper Series	Dora Mavor Moore Award for Outstanding Featured Performer/Ensemble	Nominated
2008	Kawa Ada	Stage West – Equity Emerging Theatre Artist Award	Won
2007	Kawa Ada	Saunderson Award – The Shaw Festival Outstanding Newcomer	Won
