= Saara Chaudry =

Canadian actress

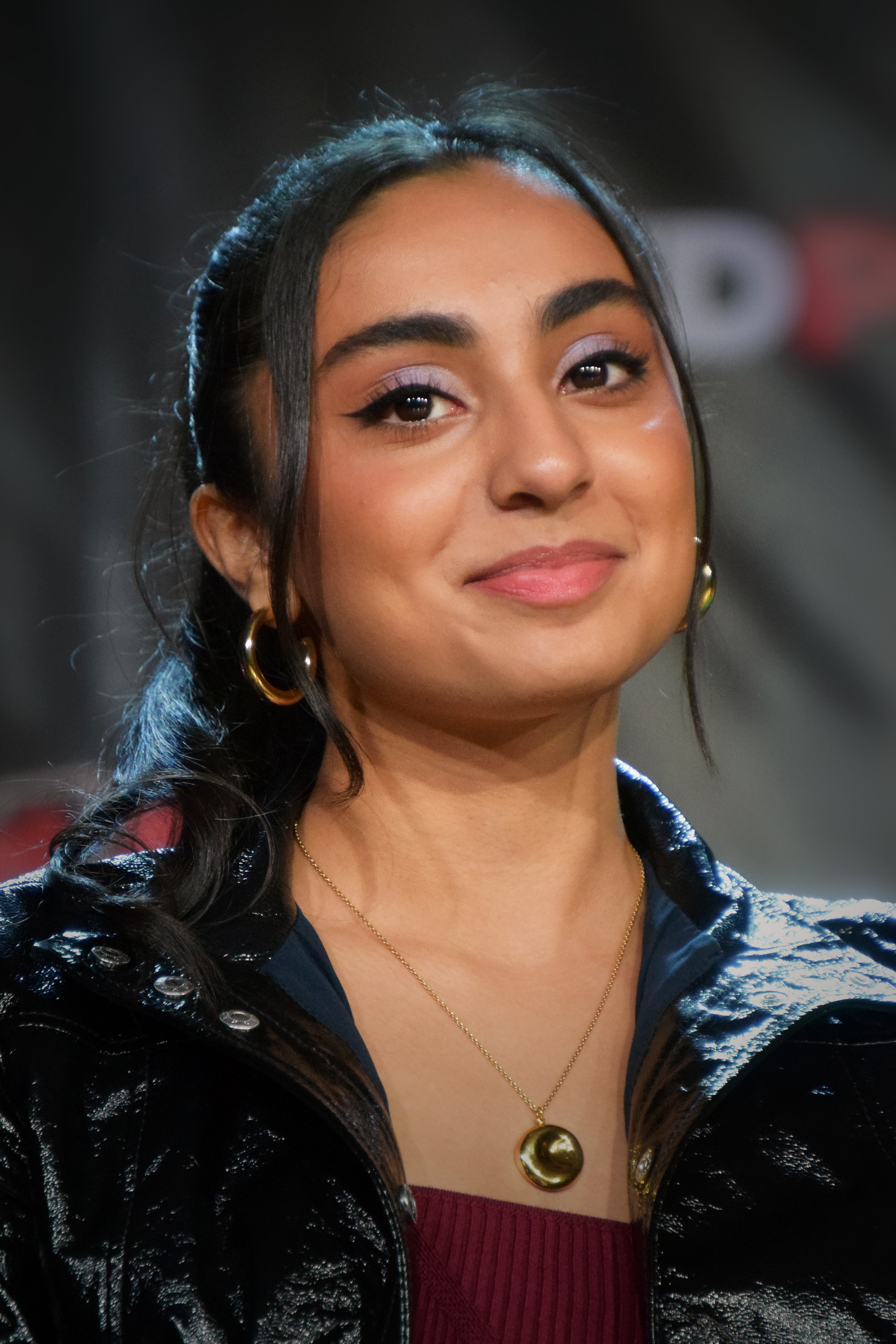
- Chaudry at the 2022 New York Comic Con
- Born: June 7, 2004 (age 22); Toronto, Ontario, Canada
- Occupation: Actress
- Years active: 2011–present

Saara Chaudry (born June 7, 2004) is a Canadian actress. She is most noted for her performances in The Breadwinner, for which she won an ACTRA Award for Best Voice Performance and was a finalist for Voice Acting in a Feature Production at the 45th Annie Awards, and The Curse of Clara: A Holiday Tale, for which she was a shortlisted Canadian Screen Award nominee for Best Performance in an Animated Television Program or Series at the 5th Canadian Screen Awards. She has also appeared in the television series Combat Hospital, Degrassi, Odd Squad, Max & Shred, Dino Dana, Holly Hobbie and The Mysterious Benedict Society.

== Filmography ==
=== Film ===
Year	Title	Role	Notes
2014	Isabelle Dances Into the Spotlight	Chloe	Direct-to-video film
2017	Reel Women Seen	Young Daughter	Short film
2017	The Breadwinner	Parvana (voice)	Voice role
2021	Paw Patrol: The Movie	Daughter (voice)	Voice role

=== Television ===
Year	Title	Role	Notes
2011	Combat Hospital	Afghan Girl #1	Episode: "Reason to Believe"
2011	Desperately Seeking Santa	Little Girl	Television film
2013	Degrassi: The Next Generation	Madison Grant	3 episodes; recurring
2014–2016	Max & Shred	Howie Finch	Main role
2015	The Curse of Clara: A Holiday Tale	Vickie (voice)	Animated television special
2015–2018	Wishenpoof!	Violet (voice)	Amazon Prime original series; voice role
2015–2018	Odd Squad	Olympia / Assistant / Other Olympia	5 episodes; recurring
2017–2020	Dino Dana	Saara Jain	Amazon Prime original series
2018	True and the Rainbow Kingdom	Night Queen	Episode: “Queens of the Day and Night”
2018–2022	Let's Go Luna!	Carmen (voice)	Main role; voice role
2019–2022	Charlie's Colorforms City	Violet (voice)	13 episodes
2018–2022	Holly Hobbie	Amy Abbasi	Main role
2019	Xavier Riddle and the Secret Museum	Cleopatra (voice)	Episode: "I Am Cleopatra"
2020	Lockdown	Nira	Main role; YouTube Originals series
2021-2022	The Mysterious Benedict Society	Martina Crowe	Recurring
2022	Bakugan: Evolutions	Callie Dahl, Miss Bliss	
2022–2023	Daniel Spellbound	Shakila Chinda	
2022–2024	Rosie's Rules	Maya (voice)	
2023	The Muppets Mayhem	Hannah	Main role
2023	Armadillo Avalanche	Raven (voice)	Main role
2024	Dino Dex	Saara Jain	Amazon Prime original series
2026	Percy Jackson and the Olympians	Zoë Nightshade	Recurring

== Awards and nominations ==
Year	Award	Category	Work	Result	Ref.
2017	Canadian Screen Awards	Best Performance in an Animated Program or Series	The Curse of Clara: A Holiday Tale	Nominated	
2018	Young Artist Awards	Best Performance in a Voice-Acting Role - Young Artist	The Breadwinner	Nominated	
2018	Young Artist Awards	Best Performance in a TV Series - Supporting Young Actress	Dino Dana	Nominated	
2018	Behind the Voice Actors Awards	Best Female Lead Vocal Performance in a Feature Film	The Breadwinner	Won	
2018	Annie Awards	Outstanding Voice Acting in a Feature Production	The Breadwinner	Nominated	
2018	Alliance of Women Film Journalists	Best Animated Female	The Breadwinner	Won	
2018	ACTRA Awards	Outstanding Performance - Voice	The Breadwinner	Won	
2019	Canadian Screen Awards	Best Performance in a Children's or Youth Program or Series	Dino Dana	Nominated	
2019	Youth Media Alliance	Outstanding Youth Performer	Dino Dana	Nominated	
2020	Canadian Screen Awards	Best Performance in a Children's or Youth Program or Series	Dino Dana	Won	
2020	Canadian Screen Awards	Best Performance in a Children's or Youth Program or Series	Holly Hobbie	Nominated	

== Personal life ==
She is of Indian descent. Her mother is South African. She was accepted into Harvard University. It is potentially possible that she is pursuing a Bachelor of Arts (A.B.) in Art, Film, and Visual Studies (AFVS) at Harvard College. In 2021, Saara won the Interpretive Reading category at WIDPSC, a prestigious public speaking and debating competition.
