= The Main Event (2020 film) =

2020 American comedy film directed by Jay Karas

- Official release poster
- Directed by: Jay Karas
- Screenplay by: Larry Postel; Jim Mahoney; Zach Lewis; Peter Hoare
- Story by: Larry Postel
- Produced by: Richard Lowell
- Starring: Seth Carr; Tichina Arnold; Ken Marino; Aryan Simhadri; Momona Tamada; Glen Gordon; Keith Lee; Babatunde Aiyegbusi; Josh Zaharia; Dallas Young; Bodhi Sabongui; Renee Paquette; Matt Polinsky; Kofi Kingston; Stephen Farrelly; Mike "The Miz" Mizanin; Adam Pally
- Cinematography: Karsten Gopinath
- Edited by: Dan Schalk
- Music by: Rupert Parkes
- Animation by: Richard Lowell
- Production company: WWE Studios
- Distributed by: Netflix
- Release date: April 10, 2020
- Running time: 101 minutes
- Country: United States
- Language: English

The Main Event is a 2020 American sports comedy film directed by Jay Karas, from a screenplay by Larry Postel and starring Seth Carr, Tichina Arnold, Ken Marino and Adam Pally. It was released on April 10, 2020, by Netflix.

== Plot ==
11-year-old Leo, whose mother was away in another city, dreams of being a successful WWE wrestler. His grandmother Denise supports his love of wrestling. Leo's dad, Steve and Denise send him off to school and he rides his bike, where he meets up with his friends. They get bullied by another boy, a teacher intervenes and sends them all to the principal.

After school, the bullies confront and chase him on their bikes, but Leo manages to hide inside a house holding an estate sale. Inside, Leo finds a box with a wrestling mask inside. He takes it home after the man in charge gives him permission and requests him not to expose the mask to anyone, otherwise he will be out of business. On TV, he sees an ad for an upcoming WWE competition. Later, Leo overhears how his mom left his dad. Also, his father needs to pay $20,000 for the mortgage to not lose the house.

Leo tries on the mask, discovering it transforms him: his voice deepens, he takes on a very strong personality and he has super strength. Doing a Google search, he finds the legend of the mask: only a genuinely deserving champion can use its powers.

Leo confronts his bullies, overpowering them using the mask. Erica, a girl he likes, is impressed and they become friends, but he is also punished and sent home from school. Donning the mask and alter ego “Kid Chaos”, Leo decides to audition for the competition. After defeating fellow competitor Smooth Operator in the semi-finals, he reaches the final, against famous wrestler Samson. Leo's fame begins to alienate his friends and Erica. He later realizes and confesses to Denise that he thought the mask would solve all of his problems, but things are only getting worse. Leo apologizes to his friends, and is forgiven.

Samson and his manager switch Leo's mask with a regular one. The competition begins, with Steve watching on TV. Samson is brutally beating Leo, when Leo realizes the mask is a fake. Steve rushes to the match. Leo climbs up the cage around the ring to avoid Samson. Realizing Samson fears heights, he dares him to see down, causing him to pass out. Leo jumps down on him, officially winning the match.

Leo gets the $50,000 check and he asks them to pass the wrestling contract with NXT to Smooth, as he is only a kid. WWE tells Leo when he is older, there will be a place for him in the organization. Two weeks later, Leo is on the school wrestling team. He has gained self-confidence without the mask and has the opportunity to wrestle his bully with his dad cheering him on from the audience.

== Cast ==
- Seth Carr as Leo Thompson/Kid Chaos
- Tichina Arnold as Grandma Denise
- Ken Marino as Frankie Albano
- Adam Pally as Steve
- Aryan Simhadri as Riyaz
- Momona Tamada as Erica
- Glen Gordon as Caleb
- Keith Lee as Smooth Operator
- Babatunde Aiyegbusi as Samson
- Josh Zaharia as Trevor
- Dallas Young as Mason
- Bodhi Sabongui as Luke
- Renee Paquette as Renee Young (herself)
- Matt Polinsky as Corey Graves (himself)
- Kofi Kingston as himself
- Sheamus as himself
- Mike "The Miz" Mizanin as himself
- Lucie Guest as Ms. Cartwright
- Nikola Bogojevic as Stinkface
- Stephanie Bell as Lights Out Leslie
- Eric Bugenhagen as Big Billy Beavers
- Scott Henson as Red Singlet Wrestler

== Production ==
In June 2019, it was announced that production on the film would begin that week in Vancouver. Moreover, it was announced that Seth Carr, Tichina Arnold, Ken Marino and Adam Pally would star in the film, with professional wrestlers Kofi Kingston, The Miz, Sheamus, Otis, Mia Yim and commentators Renee Young and Corey Graves also appearing.

== Release ==
The Main Event was released on April 10, 2020 by Netflix.

== Reception ==
On review aggregator website Rotten Tomatoes, the film holds an approval rating of 29% based on 21 reviews, and an average rating of 4.9/10. On Metacritic, the film has a weighted average score of 52 out of 100, based on 8 critics, indicating "mixed or average reviews".
