= Soma Chhaya =

Canadian actress

- Born: Soma Chhaya Bhatia; Canada
- Occupations: Actress; musician
- Years active: 2011–present

Soma Chhaya Bhatia is a Canadian actress and musician, known for her roles such as Goldi Nahir in Degrassi: Next Class and Shauzia in the Oscar nominated film The Breadwinner.

== Biography ==
Soma Chhaya became interested in singing at the age of ten, but held off on pursuing a career due to intense stage fright. "I grew up with stage fright, to the point where I’d run off the stage crying. So acting came a lot easier because I just had to stand there and talk, I didn’t even have to be myself." She began to pursue acting "by accident" as a way of getting comfortable with being in front of people. She ultimately found the craft invigorating and credits it to helping her career. Chhaya's career took off when she was cast as Goldi Nahir in Degrassi: Next Class. She found the character interesting in that it taught her about feminism. After her stint on the show, she continued to stay in contact with her co-stars. She joined the cast of the animated film The Breadwinner which connected with Chhaya due to her grandmother having gone through a similar situation as the main character of the film. She is set to play the lead role of Selene in the new film Clan of the Vein which will begin filming mid 2020.

Chhaya decided to try her hand at music again in 2016 and joined Canada's Music Incubator. She has since released 13 singles most of which she was involved with both writing and producing as well as directing videos for those singles.

In 2021, she started using the name Baby Brat for her musical career. She approached her re-branding by having her new musical identity, Baby Brat, poison herself in her self produced single and music video titled The Death Of Soma Chhaya. Her first single as Baby Brat debuted in October 2021. She describes her Baby Brat music as a hard hitting hyper-pop sound with satirical, theatrical and brash lyrics. She has since released 13 more singles, including XTC debuted at the top of the Spotify Hyperpop playlist in April 2022.

However, post pandemic, Chhaya has stepped back into acting with productions finally opening up again landing 5 roles in 2022. Of which, she landed her first starring role in the UPTV Christmas movie Christmas on the Slopes. She stars as the main character Sophia Grewal, a celebrity chef who takes her first real Christmas vacation after a disappointing restaurant opening and an embarrassing break-up. She is mistaken for the sous chef by the head chef and finds herself falling in love with cooking again and the head chef.

Soma Chhaya is also set to appear in the upcoming NBC TV show The Irrational as the character Jasmine. The pilot is scheduled to premier late 2023.

Between filming both projects Soma Chhaya developed her own acting school, Actor Academy, in which she teaches classes for actors in audition technique, character development and career planning.

== Filmography ==
Film roles
Year	Title	Role	Notes
2011	Spin The Barrel	Courtney	Short film
2014	Monkey in the Middle	Mara Cruz	Also known as It's a Zoo in Here
2015	Poltergeist	Lauren	
2017	The Breadwinner	Shauzia (voice)	
2018	We Three Queens	Charlotte	Short film
2019	An Assortment of Christmas Tales in No Particular Order	Charlotte	
2019	Queen of the Morning Calm	CeeCee	completed
2022	Christmas on the Slopes	Sophia Grewal	
2022	The Ex Obsession	Alma	
2022	Mal de Amores	Noel	
2022	Aves	Jasmine	
2023	Zoey 102	Danielle	

Television roles
Year	Title	Role	Notes
2015	Cheerleader Death Squad	Indonesian Girl	TV movie
2016	Holiday Joy	Brie	
2016-2017	Degrassi: Next Class	Goldi Nahir	Main cast
2017	Saving Hope	Falak Ali	2 episodes
2017	A Very Country Christmas	Monica	TV movie
2017	Teenagers	Vesper	4 episodes
2019	Kim's Convenience	Divya	Season 3 Ep. 9
2019	Private Eyes	Priya Joshi	Season 3 Ep. 3
2022	The Irrational	Jasmine	

== Singles ==
Year	Title
2017	Fire in Our Blood
2017	Forever Boy
2018	Honey Blonde Flower
2018	15!
2019	Love. Drugs.
2020	Don't fear the snake
2020	BORED
2020	Cancer
2020	Parasite
2021	Virtual love <3
2021	Nebula
2021	South
2021	The Death Of Soma Chhaya (feat. Baby Brat)
2021	Christmas Bitch
2021	Christmas Bitch (Remixes)
2021	Cherry Bomb
2022	Jalebi
2022	Miss you on my phone
2022	Cool in the Pool
2022	Maneater
2022	Oh, Christ! give me Diamonds
2022	XTC
2022	Hot n' Popular
2022	Rolex & Tiffanys
2022	Give me Head in the Backseat
