= Anthony Leo =

Canadian filmmaker and producer

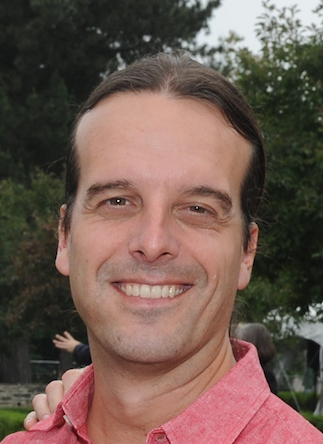
- Leo in 2018
- Occupation: film producer
- Known for: won an Academy Award

Anthony Leo is a Canadian filmmaker and producer best known for producing the 2017 animated film The Breadwinner, which earned him an Academy Award for Best Animated Feature nomination at the 90th Academy Awards.

== Filmography ==
- 2025: ‘’ Youngblood ‘’(producer)
- 2017: The Breadwinner (producer)
- 2017: Todd and the Book of Pure Evil: The End of the End (executive producer)
- 2017: Terrific Women (TV Series) (executive producer - 9 episodes)
- 2017: Bruno & Boots: The Wizzle War (TV Movie) (producer)
- 2017: Bruno & Boots: This Can't Be Happening at Macdonald Hall (TV Movie) (producer)
- 2016: Bruno & Boots: Go Jump in the Pool (TV Movie) (producer)
- 2016: Raising Expectations (TV Series) (producer - 26 episodes)
- 2015: Heroes Reborn: Dark Matters (TV Mini-Series) (producer - 6 episodes)
- 2013: Justin Bieber's Believe (Documentary) (co-producer)
- 2013: Love Me (producer)
- 2012: Hiding (Video) (producer)
- 2012: Cybergeddon Zips (TV Series) (producer - 4 episodes)
- 2012: Cybergeddon (TV Series) (producer - 9 episodes)
- 2011-2012: What's Up Warthogs! (TV Series) (producer - 40 episodes)
- 2010-2012: Todd and the Book of Pure Evil (TV Series) (executive producer, producer)
- 2008: Roxy Hunter and the Horrific Halloween (TV Movie) (producer)
- 2008: Roxy Hunter and the Secret of the Shaman (TV Movie) (co-producer)
- 2008: Roxy Hunter and the Myth of the Mermaid (TV Movie) (producer)
- 2007: Roxy Hunter and the Mystery of the Moody Ghost (TV Movie) (co-producer)
- 2003: Todd and the Book of Pure Evil' (Short) (producer)
- 2003: Squeezebox (Short) (producer)
