= Scott Henson =

Canadian wrestler (1983–2024)

Personal details
- Born: July 13, 1983 Vancouver, British Columbia, Canada
- Died: June 15, 2024 (aged 40) Vancouver, British Columbia, Canada

Scott William Henson (July 13, 1983 – June 15, 2024), also known as the Big Cat, and Scoot, was a Canadian professional wrestler in Elite Canadian Championship Wrestling. He was also an actor, podcaster and internet personality. His wrestling career began in the summer of 2000 under his independent wrestling club VCW (Van-city Championship Wrestling), briefly known as ISUXDIX (International Society Uv Xtreme Dudes in Xtremeness) from 2010-2014. For many years he was a member of the "3-2-1 Battle!" promotion, which resulted in him becoming the Solid Steel Champion twice in 2016. He was known as the "Big Cat", with a tiger themed wrestling uniform and paws.

During his career, Henson was also a podcaster. From 2018 until his death, Henson hosted The Worst Year of Our Lives podcast alongside his tag team partner Drew Smith, known online by the moniker Sarian Softpaws. He died on June 15, 2024, at the age of 40.

== Career ==
Scott Henson was born on July 13, 1983, in Vancouver. In 1996 at the age of 13, he starred in the short film William Shatner Lent Me His Hairpiece: An Untrue Story. He began his professional wrestling career in October 2002, where he made a notable impact in the 3-2-1 Battle! promotion, eventually becoming a two-time Solid Steel Champion in 2016.

In 2000, he began backyard wrestling with VCW alongside Yakuza J and The Van-city Crew. He began professionally wrestling in 2002. In 2010, VCW was renamed to ISUXDIX, with taped shows premiering on Scott's website bluethundervideo.com. The name was reverted in 2014.

In 2016, he began collaborating with Canadian YouTuber Adam Johnston, known online as YourMovieSucks. He would participate in movie commentaries and gaming live streams and was well revered for his quick, dry wit and irreverent sense of humor. He would also commentate various movies with Johnston and podcaster Gaël Attal, such as Catwoman, Space Jam, television series such as 13 Reasons Why, and the Academy Awards events yearly.

In 2018, he debuted the podcast The Worst Year of Our Lives with his friend and wrestling tag team partner, Drew Smith, known online as Sarian Softpaws. In its first season, Henson and Smith reviewed every episode of the final season of WCW Nitro. The podcast would expand into broader genres, including reviewing movies and humorously commenting on current events. Following Henson's death, Smith continues the podcast independently on his personal YouTube channel.

In 2020, Henson became a regular guest on the internet comedy podcast Drunken Peasants, hosted by Benpai and former VCW wrestler Billy the Fridge. He was posthumously awarded the title "Eternal Peasant" by Ben.

== Filmography ==
Year	Title	Role	Notes
1996	William Shatner Lent Me His Hairpiece: An Untrue Story	Wino Kid	Short film
2012	Beyond All Killer Studio Taping	Himself	Video
2016	The Link: The Documentary	Himself	Documentary
2020	The Main Event	Red Singlet Wrestler	Feature film

== Death ==
On June 16, 2024, the official Instagram page for Canadian Apex Wrestling released a statement confirming the passing of Henson: "Canadian Apex Wrestling is deeply saddened to announce the passing of one of our Tag Team Champions and beloved friend, Scott Henson. Our hearts are heavy with grief, and we extend our heartfelt condolences to his family and friends. Scott, your impact on the Pacific Northwest wrestling community is immeasurable. You were a driving force behind the careers of many, and your contributions often went unnoticed. We love you, Scott, and your absence leaves a void that words cannot express. You will be profoundly missed."

Henson's cause of death was cardiac arrest. Following his death, Henson's family asked for donations to cat rescue groups, such as the Society for the Prevention of Cruelty to Animals.
