= The Curse of Clara: A Holiday Tale =

2015 animated film

- Based on: "The Curse of Clara, or My Big Fat Disappointment" by Vickie Fagan
- Starring: Saara Chaudry, Chloe Gillard, Zoe Fraser, Sara Botsford, Sheila McCarthy, Phil Esposito, Karen Kain, Bob Cole
- Country of origin: Canada
- Original language: English

Original release
- Network: CBC Television
- Release: December 14, 2015

The Curse of Clara: A Holiday Tale is a Canadian animated television film, which aired on CBC Television in 2015. Based on the autobiographical short story "The Curse of Clara, or My Big Fat Disappointment" by Vickie Fagan, the film centres on her experience as a young girl studying ballet at Canada's National Ballet School who is cast in the role of Clara in the school's annual production of The Nutcracker, only to learn of the longstanding legend that the role is cursed because nobody who played Clara as a student has ever gone on to play the starring role of the Sugar Plum Fairy as a professional adult dancer. Her only guide through her fears and worries is her crush on hockey star Phil Esposito, whom she regularly imagines coaching and guiding her dancing.

The film premiered on December 14, 2015 on CBC Television, before receiving a repeat airing on Christmas Day.

At the 5th Canadian Screen Awards in 2016, the film won the award for Best Animated Program or Series.

== Cast ==
- Saara Chaudry as Victoria "Vickie" Fagan of Niagara Falls
- Chloe Gillard as Peter
- Zoe Fraser as Bella
- Sara Botsford as the ballet mistress
- Sheila McCarthy as the narrator
- Phil Esposito as himself
- Karen Kain as herself
- Bob Cole as himself
