= The Secret Keepers =

Book written by Trenton Lee Stewart

The Secret Keepers is a novel written by Trenton Lee Stewart and illustrated by Diana Sudyka, first published in 2016.

== Plot ==
Reuben Pedley is a shy boy who lives in a failing, grim city called New Umbra. The city is controlled by a strange, dark figure known as "the Smoke." Reuben discovers an ancient watch and discovers it grants the wearer the power of invisibility. However, he soon discovers "the Smoke" is also after the artifact. Reuben must unravel the mystery and secrets surrounding the watch and thwart the plans of "the Smoke" before it is too late for him and those he loves.

== Characters ==
=== Main characters ===
- Reuben Pedley is an eleven-year-old boy and the main protagonist of the story.
- Reuben's mom is a spunky single parent who is fiercely devoted to her son and hard-working
- Mrs. Genevieve is a kindhearted antique shop owner who is the first person Reuben confides in regarding the watch.
- Penny Nelson is a bold and resourceful girl from the Nelson family, who quickly allies with Reuben after discovering the secret of the watch
- Jack Nelson is Penny's older brother who provides the necessary brawn to fight against the Smoke

== Critical reception ==
The Secret Keepers has received generally positive reviews. Kirkus Reviews said that, "Fans of The Mysterious Benedict Society (2007) will welcome Stewart's latest puzzling adventure, whose seemingly ordinary hero proves quite extraordinary."

== Awards ==
The Secret Keepers was a New York Times bestseller in 2016.
