= Joshua Hill (musician) =

American musician

- Also known as: The Hill In Mind
- Origin: Flagstaff, Arizona, U.S.
- Genres: Experimental; Avant-garde; Folk; Indie rock
- Occupations: Musician; Composer; Multimedia artist
- Instruments: Violin; Guitar; Bass; Piano
- Website: www.thehillinmind.com

Joshua Hill is an American musician, composer, multi-instrumentalist, and multimedia artist from Flagstaff, Arizona. Performing under his own name and the moniker The Hill In Mind, Hill creates experimental music that blends folk, rock, and avant-garde styles.

He gained recognition for writing and performing the song "The Crown Sleeps" with Qais Essar for the animated film The Breadwinner, which won the Academy of Canadian Cinema and Television Award for Best Achievement in Music – Original Song at the 6th Canadian Screen Awards in 2018.

== Career ==
Hill began his career as a violinist and composer in Flagstaff, Arizona. He has released music both as Joshua Hill and as The Hill In Mind, including the 2015 album Thimble, Needle, and Thread, recorded with Bob Hoag in Mesa, Arizona.

Hill has collaborated with artists including Califone, Boxhead Ensemble, Roomful of Teeth, and Simon Joyner.

In 2020, Hill developed the multimedia performance Song Cycle, inspired by his experience caring for his father with dementia. The project explored themes of memory, family, and music, and was presented at venues including REDCAT and the Coconino Center for the Arts.

In 2021, he collaborated with composer and opera singer Micaela Tobin on Tent Music, a project originating from improvised recordings in a tent in Flagstaff.

== Selected works ==
- Song Cycle (2020) – multimedia performance
- Cowboy Dream (2024) – performance project
- The Breadwinner (2018) – film score, Best Original Song, Canadian Screen Awards
- Tent Music (2023) – collaborative album with Micaela Tobin

== Discography ==
=== As The Hill In Mind ===
- Cowboy Dream (Acceptance Is An Arrow) (LP, 2026)
- Hill Never Sing Again (LP, 2016)
- Thimble, Needle, and Thread (LP, 2015)
- The Hill In Mind (EP, 2015)
