= Ali Badshah =

Canadian/Pakistani actor, writer, producer, director, and comedian

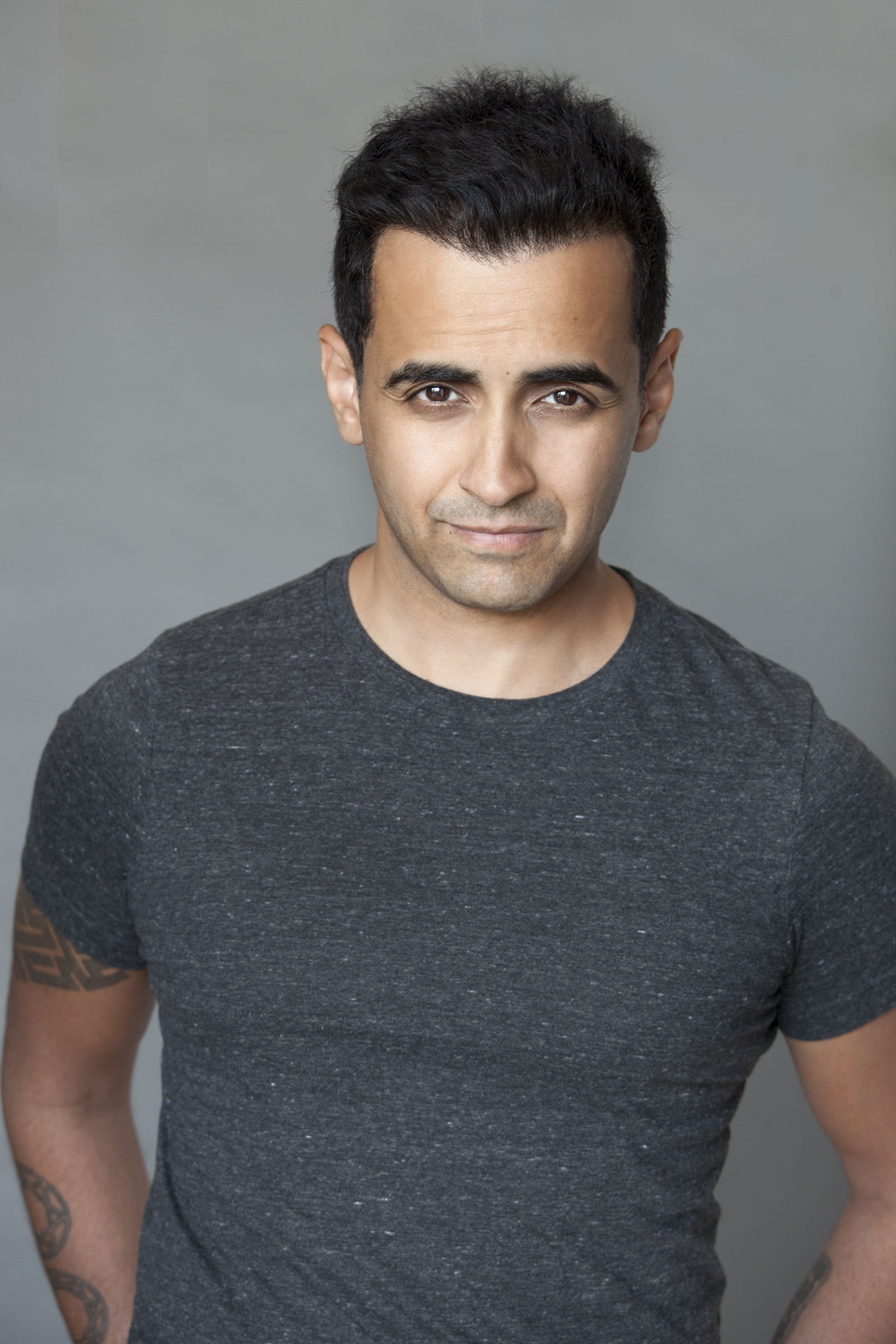
- Born: Sayyid Ali Mehdi Rizvi Badshah Al-Hussaini; Toronto, Ontario, Canada

Ali Badshah (born Sayyid Ali Mehdi Rizvi Badshah Al-Hussaini) is a Canadian actor, writer, comedian, producer, and director. Badshah played Nurullah in the Irish animated film The Breadwinner.

== Career ==
Working as a comedian, Badshah has written and acted in comedy skits for CBC, CTV, The Comedy Network, MTV, and ABC2 Australia.

His style of comedy is observational and likely originated from his experiences growing up and living in Toronto.

Badshah wrote and performed for Video on Trial and was an associate producer for MuchMusic.

He created the sketch series Bloody Immigrants for CBC. Ali was also featured on the Comedy Network's 'Nubian Disciples Special.'
