= Qais Essar =

Afghan-American musician

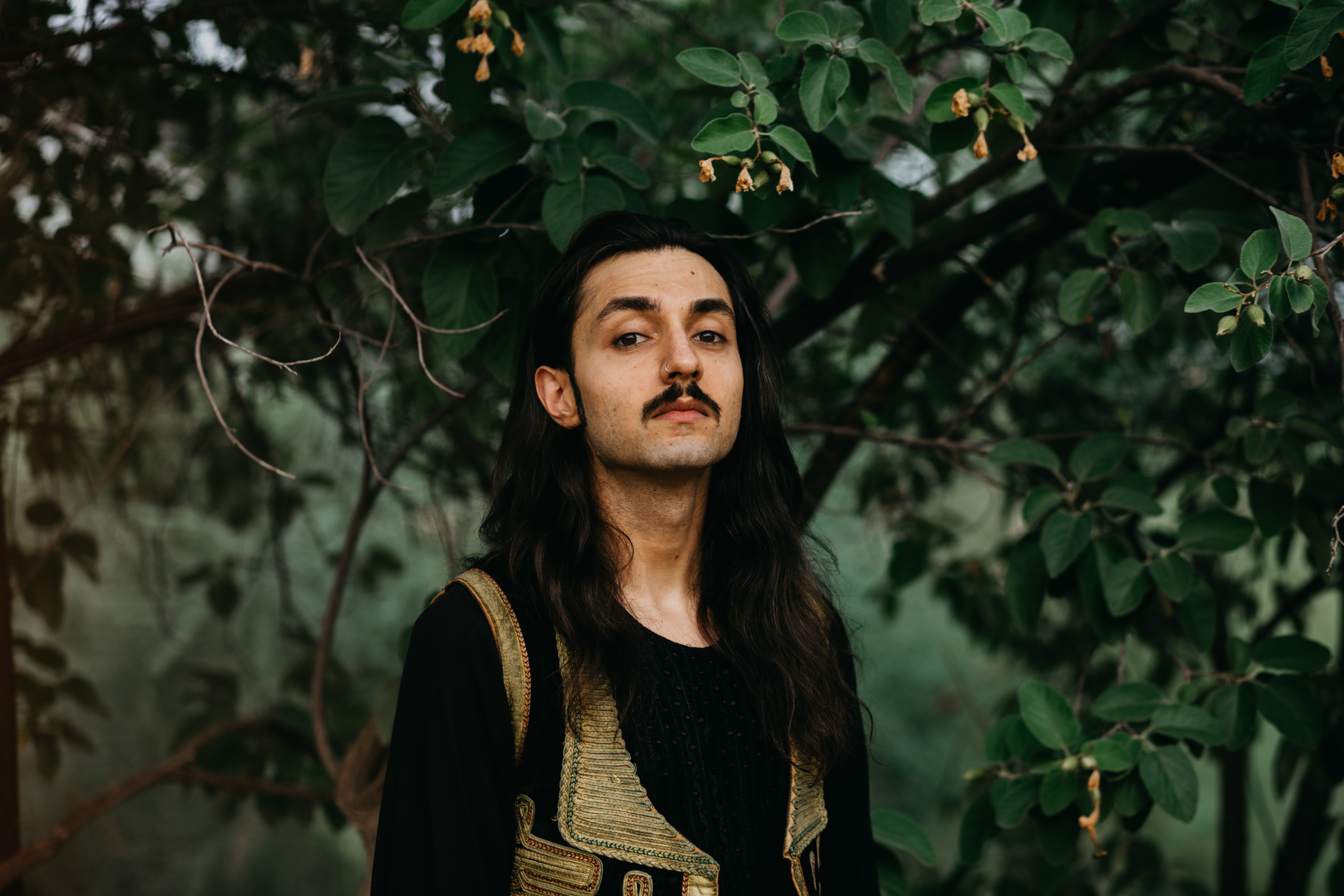
- Essar in 2000

Background information
- Occupations: Musician; composer; producer
- Instruments: Rubab; santur
- Labels: Worlds Within Worlds; Ghost Songs
- Award: 2018 Canadian Screen Award for Best Original Song
- Website: therabab.com

Qais Essar is an Afghan-American musician, composer, and producer based in Phoenix, Arizona. He primarily plays the rubab, composing music that combines traditional with modern styles. He has released several solo albums as well as collaborative recordings and film scores, for such productions as The Breadwinner (2017) and Three Songs for Benazir (2021). With Joshua Hill, he co-wrote the song "The Crown Sleeps" for The Breadwinner; it won them a Canadian Screen Award for Best Original Song in 2018.

== Discography ==
=== Albums ===
Year	Album
2014	The Green Language
2016	Tavern of Ruin
2017	Live from Toronto with Neelamjit Dhillon
2018	The Ghost You Love Most
2024	Echoes of the Unseen
2024	Mehfil Baby
2025	Sangat
2026	A Line Between Hearts

=== EP ===
Year	EP
2015	I Am Afghan, Afghani Is Currency
2017	I Am Afghan, Afghani Is Currency, Vol. II: Beltoon
2018	Misc Vol 1
2019	I Am Afghan, Afghani Is Currency, Vol. III: Zahir
2020	Shakar Shack, Vol. 1: Gulaab Jammin' with Absolute Focus
2024	Shakar Shack, Vol. 2: Gas Ghazaler with Absolute Focus et al.
2024	I Am Afghan, Afghani Is Currency, Vol. 4: Koh-i Baba
2025	I Am Afghan, Afghani Is Currency, Vol. 5: Love Songs

=== Singles ===
Year	Single
2015	"Klasik"
2016	"The Thaw"
2019	"Khoda Buwad Ham Rahet, Pt. 2"
2019	"Letters to My Best Friend"
2020	"The Waves" (feat. Chris Trinidad)
2020	"Syzygy" (feat. Alam Khan)
2020	"Kista Man Rahnaward" (feat. Yalda Mohsen)
2020	"An Ode to Who We Were" (feat. Anupam Shobhakar & Neelamjit Dhillon)
2021	"On Solitude"
2023	"Strange Village" with Alam Khan
2023	"My Whole Heart"
2024	"Ba Ishq Tu"
2024	"Ya Zamani" Alsarah feat. Qais Essar
2025	"Lal Meri Pat" with Sonny Singh (feat. Sandeep Singh)
2025	"Vich Sangat" with Sonny Singh (feat. Robin Ryczek)
2025	"Pavan Guru" with Sonny Singh
2025	"Kabaram Raseeda Imshab" with Sonny Singh
2025	"Rich" with Joseph Rabjohns

== Filmography ==
Essar's screen work spans animated features, documentaries, and short films. He composed the music for "The Crown Sleeps", featured in the 2017 animated film The Breadwinner. The song was shortlisted for the Academy Award for Best Original Song and won the Canadian Screen Award for Best Original Song in 2018.

Essar also composed the original score for the Academy Award-nominated documentary short Three Songs for Benazir (2021). His later work includes Kabul, City of Dreams (2025), for which he composed the original score; the film won Best Soundtrack at the Night of Shorts that year.

Year	Film	Contribution
2017	The Breadwinner	Composed the music for "The Crown Sleeps"
2021	Three Songs for Benazir	Composer – original music
2025	Kabul, City of Dreams	Composer – original score
