= The Extraordinary Education of Nicholas Benedict =

Book by Trenton Lee Stewart

- The US first edition cover
- Author: Trenton Lee Stewart
- Cover artist: Diana Sudyka
- Language: English
- Series: Mysterious Benedict Society
- Genre: Children's
- Publisher: Little, Brown and Company
- Publication date: 2012
- Publication place: United States
- Pages: 470 pp
- ISBN: 978-0-316-17619-4
- LC Class: PZ7.S8513Ext2012
- Followed by: The Mysterious Benedict Society

The Extraordinary Education of Nicholas Benedict is a novel by American author Trenton Lee Stewart. It is a prequel to The Mysterious Benedict Society, taking place during the troubled childhood of Nicholas Benedict, a nine-year-old orphan and genius, and his friends, John Cole and Violet Hopefield.

== Plot ==
Nicholas Benedict, a nine-year-old orphan and genius, moves to the Rothschild Manor orphanage after being removed from his previous orphanage, Littleview, because of his narcolepsy, a condition that sends him into deep sleep at unexpected moments, and, in Nicholas' case, often whilst he is laughing or experiencing strong emotion. Because of his condition, he is forced to sleep in a room all by himself that is locked each night by the director, Mr. Collum, instead of in the dormitory with all the other boys. The room had a window that was blocked up to prevent Nicholas from sneaking about through it. Nicholas, however, is able to remove the mortar as it had not dried properly. He quickly becomes friends with a scarred-faced boy named John, and enemies with the orphanage bullies: Iggy, Breaker, and Moray, or as they are more commonly referred to, the Spiders. He outwits the Spiders when they try to harm him, causing their hatred to increase. Because of his intellect, Nicholas comes up with an idea to be able to let himself out of his room at night. When the director escorts him to the washroom one night to allow him to brush his teeth, Nicholas pretends he forgot his brush, and so the director gives him the key and allows him to run back to his room to fetch it. Instead, he takes a candle out of its sconce, and presses the key into the soft wax to make an impression of it, and runs back to the washroom with the key and his toothbrush. During metalworking class, he made the imprint into a key, which he finds is a skeleton key. This allows him to wander all around the manor during the night and access many places, which comes in handy, as Nicholas finds out of the legend of huge treasure being hidden in the Manor, and with his friends John and Violet (a deaf girl who lives on a nearby farm), he does his best to find it. When John gets adopted, and the Spiders burn John's letter, Nicholas escapes from the orphanage. He then discovers a government attorney who acts kindly to him. Wanting to be like the government attorney, he returns to the orphanage. He then discovers that John was adopted by Violet's family. Violet, who wants to go to art school, plans on giving up going to art school so that Nicholas can be adopted by them, too. Nicholas, however, refuses. He then discovers that the treasure was nothing more than a library. He realized that this was a treasure to Mrs. Rothschild, and sees why she would consider this treasure.

== Characters ==
Nicholas Benedict: An extremely gifted 9-year-old boy, with a condition called narcolepsy.

Mrs. Ferrier: An elderly woman who escorts Nicholas to the orphanage from Littleview, his previous orphanage.

Mr. Collum: The director of Rothschild Manor orphanage, where Nicholas lives during the course of the book.

Mr. Pileus: The general handyman of Child's end, another name for Rothschild Manor.

John Cole: A 12-year-old boy with chicken-pox scars all over his face who becomes friends with Nicholas at the Manor.

The Spiders: Iggy, Breaker, and Moray, the orphanage bullies.

Mrs. Brindle: The woman in charge of the cleaning at the orphanage.

Ms. Candace: The slightly senile nurse, also sneeringly called "Miss Pretty Pills" by Mrs. Brindle. She has a habit of giving the children drops that make them quite ill, though not intentionally.

Mr. Griese: The cook, who Mrs. Brindle is in love with.

Mr. Furrow: The man in charge of the barn and yard work at the orphanage.

Rabbit A donkey who helps Nicholas get the drill out of the cave

Violet Hopefield: A deaf girl who has finished eighth grade. She lives on a farm near Childs' End and becomes good friends with Nicholas and John through a strange turn of events.
