= Three Songs for Benazir =

2021 documentary short film by Elizabeth Mirzaei and Gulistan Mirzaei

- Directed by: Gulistan Mirzaei; Elizabeth Mirzaei
- Produced by: Gulistan Mirzaei; Elizabeth Mirzaei; Omar Mullick; Homayoun Noori; Jamil Rezaei
- Starring: Shaista Khan; Benazir
- Cinematography: Elizabeth Mirzaei
- Edited by: Melanie Annan; Christoph Wermke
- Music by: Qais Essar
- Production company: Mirzaei Films
- Distributed by: Netflix
- Release date: 6 June 2021
- Running time: 22 minutes
- Country: Afghanistan
- Languages: Pashto; Dari

Three Songs for Benazir (Pashto: دری سندری د بینظیر لپاره, romanized: Dri Sandri Da Binazir Lapara) is a 2021 Afghan-American documentary short film by Elizabeth Mirzaei and Gulistan Mirzaei.

== Synopsis ==
The story of Shaista, a young man who—newly married to Benazir and living in a camp for displaced people in Kabul—struggles to balance his dreams of being the first from his tribe to join the Afghan National Army with the responsibilities of starting a family. Even as Shaista's love for Benazir is palpable, the choices he must make to build a life with her have shattering consequences.

== Release ==
The film had its world premiere at the Full Frame Documentary Film Festival in June 2021, where it won the Jury Award for Best Short and qualified for the Oscars. In August 2021, the film had its European premiere at the Odense International Film Festival, where it won the Soapbox Award. In February 2022, Three Songs for Benazir won Outstanding Nonfiction Short at the Cinema Eye Honors.

In December 2021, it was announced that Netflix had acquired distribution rights to the film, and set it for a 24 January 2022, release.

== Accolades ==
- 94th Academy Awards: Academy Award for Best Documentary (Short Subject) - Nominated
- Cinema Eye Honors: Outstanding Nonfiction Short - Winner
- Full Frame Documentary Film Festival: Best Documentary Short - Winner
- Clermont-Ferrand International Short Film Festival: Audience Award - Winner
- Australian Screen Editors: ASE Award - Winner
- Odense International Film Festival: Soapbox Award - Winner
- Yamagata International Documentary Film Festival: Award of Excellence - Winner
- Message to Man: Best Documentary Short - Winner
- Social Impact Media Awards: Best Short Documentary - Winner
