= The Mysterious Benedict Society and the Prisoner's Dilemma =

2009 novel by Trenton Lee Stewart

- First edition
- Author: Trenton Lee Stewart
- Illustrator: Diana Sudyka
- Language: English
- Series: The Mysterious Benedict Society
- Genre: Children's, juvenile fiction
- Publisher: Little, Brown
- Publication date: October 6, 2009
- Publication place: United States
- Pages: 391
- ISBN: 978-0-316-04552-0
- OCLC: 318879201
- LC Class: PZ7.S8513 Myg 2009
- Preceded by: The Mysterious Benedict Society and the Perilous Journey
- Followed by: The Mysterious Benedict Society and the Riddle of Ages

The Mysterious Benedict Society and the Prisoner's Dilemma is a 2009 children's novel written by Trenton Lee Stewart and illustrated by Diana Sudyka. For a decade it remained the third and final book in the Mysterious Benedict Society series; however, a new adventure followed in 2019.

== Plot summary ==
In the third installment of the Mysterious Benedict Society series, Reynie, Sticky, Kate, Constance, and various loved ones find themselves holed up in Mr. Benedict's house, which is teeming with security. The evil Mr. Curtain is at large and hunting for the Whisperer—now in Mr. Benedict's possession—so he can control minds from afar. When a businessman named Mr. Pressius (one of the 'bullfrogs' on board the Shortcut in The Perilous Journey) appears with false records claiming that he is Constance's father, Mr. Benedict is compelled to use the Whisperer to uncover her short past. Distraught and confused after Sticky mistakenly reveals her birth certificates were destroyed (later discovered to be miraculously intact), Constance runs away, with the whole household after her—just the distraction Mr. Curtain and his men need to steal the Whisperer and set his evil plans into motion. Of course, the rest of the Mysterious Benedict Society soon find themselves on his trail.

Soon, Reynie receives telepathic messages telling him a code number. He realizes it is a library code number, and Sticky tells them that that book's only copy is located in a library. They find Constance and an apparent clue to where the Whisperer is, but it turns out to be a trap. They are captured by Mr. Curtain, and find themselves in a prison with a construction site. Kate makes several attempts to escape but does not prevail. Finally, thanks to Constance, their various loved ones come to the rescue, particularly Milligan, who fights McCracken, leader of Mr. Curtain's team of "Ten Men". In a final confrontation, Mr Curtain attempts to brainwash Mr Benedict, who reveals he had inserted a self-destruct into the Whisperer, which had just come into effect. Having lost everything, and realizing that he is now bound for defeat, Mr. Curtain attempts suicide, but S.Q. prevents him out of love.

Mr. Curtain is arrested and sent to prison. Milligan retires, Constance is adopted by Mr. Benedict, and the families settle in the first and second floor of Mr. Benedict's house. (Or in Sticky's case, across the street.) His narcolepsy is later cured by Constance, thanks to her unusual gifts. The book ends with Mr Benedict laughing unrestrainedly for the first time in his life.

== Characters ==
- Reynard "Reynie" Muldoon is a twelve-year-old living with his tutor and adopted mother, Miss Perumal, who is teaching him Tamil. Exceptionally bright, Reynie looks between the lines, observing and questioning, and gets past most obstacles by finding the "puzzle" within the situation. Reynie is an especially average-looking boy with average brown hair, average pale complexion, average clothes, and average height. He resides in the home of Mr. Benedict with his mother and friends Constance, Sticky, and Kate because the government has issued that the 4 children be placed in hiding because of threat of kidnapping and worse from the nefarious Ledroptha Curtain. He handles Constance better than Kate, and Sticky.
- George "Sticky" Washington is also a twelve-year-old boy. He is characterized by his intelligence and ability to remember everything he reads—hence his nickname, for everything sticks in his mind. He strongly prefers this nickname to his given name, George Washington. Sticky ran away from his home after feeling that he is not wanted by his parents and lived near a river, but is now living in Mr. Benedict's home along with his parents. He has tea-colored skin and is bald because he used hair remover to disguise himself. Sticky also has a bad habit of polishing his spectacles whenever he gets nervous. Sticky also ran away, because his brain needed a rest from contests and his parents were forcing him to do work to get money. His family spent a fortune finding Sticky, leaving them very poor. His mother is wheel-chair bound and his father does not speak a lot.
- Kate "The Great Kate Weather Machine" Wetherall is an energetic fourteen-year-old girl who became an orphan as a young child when her mother died and her father left her. She found out that Mr. Benedict's spy, Milligan, is her father, and lived with him on a farm until she and her father had to go into hiding. Kate finds any and all shortcuts in a conflict, and carries a red metal bucket which houses a great many things which she uses to overcome obstacles and evade capture. She owns a trained peregrine falcon named Madge (short for Her Majesty the Queen). Included in her bucket is a Swiss Army knife and a rope. She is very physically capable and almost fearless, often rushing into things without giving them a second thought. She has long, blond hair and light blue eyes.
- Constance Contraire is the fourth child of the group. She is three years old, the youngest of the four. At the end of the first book (The Mysterious Benedict Society) Mr. Benedict decides to adopt her. Though she at first does not appear to have any special abilities, her bravery, stubbornness and special attention to detail ultimately prove to be a great asset.She is characterized as having had the ability to read, write, and speak when she was just about the age of two. Also an orphan, her parents died in a train crash and, at a young age, wandered off and lived in a library storage room. Constance can detect patterns in things, and though it may seem like she is psychic, Constance merely recognized patterns and unknowingly can predict the near future. She has wispy blonde hair and very clear blue eyes. Constance's young age explains her frequent napping and obstinacy. Constance also has other abilities, including the ability of extra-sensory perception and the ability to change people's minds. But, as a result of changing their minds, she gets very sick and very stressed out, as ill as if she had the flu (or worse).
- Mr. Nicholas Benedict is a little older than middle-aged man who recruits the children that later call themselves the Mysterious Benedict Society. He is the one who discovered the plans of his identical twin brother, Ledroptha Curtain, who he was separated from just after birth because their parents had died. However, none of his colleagues believed him and called him crazy. Mr. Benedict has narcolepsy, which causes him to fall asleep when experiencing strong emotions (usually laughter), but Constance Contraire cures him of his narcolepsy using her abilities.
- Mr. Ledroptha Curtain is Mr. Benedict's evil twin brother. He wears silver glasses and green plaid suits, and usually makes his way around in a motorized wheelchair. Like his brother, he has narcolepsy, but his condition is triggered by anger, where as Mr. Benedict's is triggered by laughter.
- Rhonda Kazembe is Mr. Benedict's adopted daughter. She comes from Zambia and spoke Bembi as a child. Like Number Two (shown below), Rhonda is an assistant to Mr. Benedict.
- Number Two is Mr. Benedict's assistant and adopted daughter. She doesn't sleep very much, and as such needs a high food intake. In this book, Constance tricks her into revealing her real name (Pencilla). She also dresses like a pencil, she has red hair, a yellowish complexion and always wears yellow.
- Milligan had been a spy, whom Mr. Curtain captured. Though Mr. Curtain erased his memories, he managed to escape and eventually became Mr. Benedict's bodyguard. However, his memory is triggered when the four children are in danger and he desperately needs to save them, and he is revealed to be Kate's father. Milligan expertly uses a tranquilizer gun to protect himself and others from the Ten Men. To save the children and give them a head start to defeat Mr. Curtain, Milligan jumps onto McCracken (off of a three-story building).
- S.Q. Pedalian is Mr. Ledroptha Curtain's private assistant. Although he is a rather dim-witted orphan, he has a kind heart. In this book he is told by Reynie that Mr. Curtain had removed his memories of Mr. Curtain using the Whisperer for evil. When Mr. Curtain orders him to capture the members of the Mysterious Benedict Society, he disobeys, because he doesn't want Mr. Curtain to hurt them. In the end, S.Q. saves Mr. Curtain's life from his attempted suicide, and visits him daily in the Stonetown Prison.
- Moocho Brazos is Mr. Benedict's chef. He was once in the circus with Kate, but now is a member of Mr. Benedict's team. In the last book, he helped Kate and Milligan on the Wetherall farm. He is known for his famous apple pies.
- Ten Men are Mr. Curtain's henchmen, with little to no loyalty beyond being paid as mercenaries. In this book we meet six of the ten men, four of whom we already knew. McCracken is the leader of the ten men and the most dangerous. Crawlings is the most careless (and has only one eyebrow). Garrotte is muscular, with a bushy beard. Sharpe is tall and wears glasses. In this book we meet Bludgins, one of the more eccentric of the Ten Men. Each time Bludgins is mentioned in this book, he is either going above and beyond in his technique or holding/wearing something expensive. Hertz wears a seersucker suit, owns a weighted pen, and is afraid of the Whisperer.

== Reception ==
Booklist stated "Displaying much of the charm of the first book, this would make a fitting end to the series, but the Society's legion of fans probably wouldn't say no to more." while the School Library Journal wrote "the story lacks the facile agility of its predecessors. On the other hand, the opening gambit is fresh and frightfully funny ... If this is the last Society installment, readers had better, as Reynie says, "acquire a taste for the bittersweet."" Common Sense Media wrote "But the story takes awhile to get going (the first 100 pages could have been condensed to 20)," and "A few more surprises and twists would have been welcome. Not that the simpler story will keep fans away -- and once the action picks up in the last third, kids will definitely be engaged."
