= The Mysterious Benedict Society (TV series) =

2021 American mystery television series

- Genre: Family; Mystery; Adventure
- Created by: Phil Hay & Matt Manfredi
- Based on: The Mysterious Benedict Society by Trenton Lee Stewart
- Starring: Tony Hale; Kristen Schaal; MaameYaa Boafo; Ryan Hurst; Gia Sandhu; Mystic Inscho; Seth B. Carr; Emmy DeOliveira; Marta Kessler
- Music by: Theodore Shapiro; Joseph Shirley; Siddhartha Khosla
- Country of origin: United States
- Original language: English
- No. of seasons: 2
- No. of episodes: 16

Production
- Executive producers: James Bobin; Phil Hay; Matt Manfredi; Deepak Nayar; Karen Kehela Sherwood; Todd Slavkin Darren Swimmer; Jamie Tarses
- Production location: British Columbia
- Running time: 51–57 minutes
- Production companies: Slavkin Swimmer Productions; FamilyStyle; Halcyon Studios (Note: Known as Sonar Entertainment for season 1); 20th Television

Original release
- Network: Disney+ Disney Channel (Season 2)
- Release: June 25, 2021 – December 6, 2022

The Mysterious Benedict Society is an American mystery adventure television series based on the children's books by Trenton Lee Stewart. The series stars Tony Hale as Mr. Benedict, who gathers four children to stop a global emergency. Hale also portrays Benedict's twin brother, Mr. Curtain, who is the founder of the school the children infiltrate. The first season premiered on Disney+ on June 25, 2021, and consisted of eight episodes. In September 2021, the series was renewed for a second season. The second season premiered with two episodes on October 25, 2022, on Disney Channel and on Disney+ the following day. In January 2023, the series was canceled after two seasons. The series was removed from Disney+ on May 26, 2023, as part of a cost-cutting initiative by Disney CEO Bob Iger. However, the show is still viewable in Australia on the Australian Broadcasting Corporation as they bought the rights to broadcast and stream the show in 2025.

== Premise ==
During a global crisis called "The Emergency", Mr. Benedict, a talented and smart individual, recruits four kids for a dangerous mission to infiltrate the Learning Institute for Veritas and Enlightenment (L.I.V.E) on Nomansan Island, just off the coast of Stonetown, the site of the Monk Building, where the children are first recruited. The Institute is a school run by Dr. L.D. Curtain, who sends messages that infiltrate one's subconscious using children, which allows him to slip ideas and thoughts into people's minds. Mr. Benedict sends the four kids he has recruited into the Institute to stop this nefariousness and to save the world from Dr. Curtain's machinations.

== Cast and characters ==
=== Main ===
- Tony Hale as Mr. Nicholas Benedict, the leader of the Mysterious Benedict Society. He has type 1 narcolepsy with cataplexy and faints when experiencing intense emotions. Assisted by his trusty associates, Benedict camps out by the Institute for most of the series to keep watch over the children.
  - Hale also portrays Dr. L.D. Curtain/Nathaniel Benedict, the founder of the Institute and Benedict's long-lost twin brother. He is secretly working on a machine called the Whisperer that is causing a worldwide emergency.
  - Luke Roessler plays the young versions of Nicholas and Nathaniel.
- Kristen Schaal as Number Two, an associate of Benedict
- MaameYaa Boafo as Rhonda Kazembe, an associate of Benedict
- Ryan Hurst as Milligan, an associate of Benedict
- Gia Sandhu as Ms. Perumal, Reynie's tutor in the orphanage
- Mystic Inscho as Reynard "Reynie" Muldoon, one of the children Benedict recruits. He is intelligent and resourceful.
- Seth Carr as George "Sticky" Washington, one of the children Benedict recruits. He is incredibly smart and can remember everything he reads.
  - Trae Maridadi plays young Sticky.
- Emmy DeOliveira as Kate Wetherall, one of the children Benedict recruits. She always carries around a bucket with tools she might need.
  - Leia Bajic plays young Kate.
- Marta Kessler as Constance Contraire, the youngest prodigy of the children Benedict recruits

=== Recurring ===
- Saara Chaudry as Martina Crowe, a student at the Institute who competes with Reynie and Sticky and recruits Kate to her tetherball team.
- Katherine Evans as Jillson, one of the children's guides when they arrive at the Institute.
- Ben Cockell as Jackson, one of the children's guides when they arrive at the Institute.
- Reece Noi as Marlon, Dr.Curtain's second in command
- Fred Melamed as Captain Noland, skipper of the luxurious ocean liner The Shortcut, upon which the young detectives travel the world.
- Shannon Kook as Mr. Oshiro, a teacher who works at the Institute and often puzzles his students with brain teasers and questions.
- Ricardo Ortiz as S.Q., Curtain's adopted son, who is oblivious to his evil deeds and befriends Reynie.
- Trenna Keating as Dr. Garrison, Curtain's chief scientist working on the Whisperer.
- Joel de la Fuente as Officer "Cannonball" Zhao, Captain Noland's second in command who suspects the children are stowaways.
- Lex King as Ilsa, the leader of Dr. Garrison's mercenaries who are disguised as water polo players.

=== Guests ===
- Bronson Pinchot as Yanis, a friendly Danish man who runs an inn with his wife Sofia.
- Pip Pellens as Sofia, a friendly Danish woman who runs an inn with her husband Yanis.
- Harriet Sansom Harris as Rowena Two, Number Two's strict mother.
- Christina Kirk as Charity Two, Number Two's very odd sister.
- Haley Joel Osment as One Two, Number Two's happy-go-lucky brother.

== Episodes ==
Season	Episodes	Originally released	
Season	Episodes	First released	Last released
1	8	June 25, 2021	August 6, 2021
2	8	October 25, 2022	December 6, 2022

=== Season 1 (2021) ===
No. overall	No. in season	Title	Directed by	Written by	Original release date
1	1	"A Bunch Of Smart Orphans"	James Bobin	Phil Hay & Matt Manfredi	June 25, 2021
Reynie Muldoon, an orphan who often feels like an outsider and weird, is given the special opportunity to try out for a scholarship to attend the Boatwright Academy, a prestigious school. He arrives to take the test to get in, and finds that only he passes. Reynie is told to return soon for a second, much harder test, and to bring only one pencil. He finds one girl, Rhonda, has lost her pencil, so he breaks his in two and gives Rhonda one half. Once again, he is the only one in the room to pass the test. Three other children who also passed arrive from different rooms, and all together the four partake in a series of other unique quizzes that test their wit and ability to work together. Once only three of them are left, including Reynie himself, Sticky, and Kate, they are escorted to meet Mr. Benedict. Benedict tells them that both Rhonda and the scholarship to Boatwright were a ruse. He introduces them to the fourth member of their team, Constance. Benedict admits that he gathered them to stop something called the "Emergency" just as an alarm goes off.
2	2	"Carrying A Bird"	Greg Beeman	Phil Hay & Matt Manfredi	June 25, 2021
Benedict explains that the Emergency is caused by hidden messages in the television. Strange men attack the facility, but Rhonda (who works for Benedict), Number Two, Milligan, and the children, hold them off. Benedict prepares the children to send them to a remote school off-shore where he believes the messages are originating. The team gets to work practicing Morse code and bonding with each other. Sticky tells the others how his uncle and aunt put too much pressure on him, so he ran away. The children are taken to the academy while Benedict observes on the outskirts of the campus. The kids meet Jackson and Jillson, their guides. The team finds all the contradicting rules and guidelines confusing while waiting to meet the headmaster. They choose to report back to Benedict. Kate decides to climb a tower she believes has the transmitter in it alone, causing an argument. The kids attend their first class, which Reynie and Kate excel at. The headmaster arrives, looking identical to Benedict and calling himself Curtain.
3	3	"Depends on the Wagon"	Glen Winter	Chelsey Lora	July 2, 2021
The children figure out that Mr Curtain and Mr Benedict are twin brothers and send that information to Benedict. He infers that the headmaster of the Institute is his long-lost brother Nathaniel. Back at the Institute, the four children view a ranking of all of the students by academic prowess. They see that Kate and Constance are failing their classes and that the least successful student is exiled from the island. They communicate this to Mr. Benedict, who advises Kate and Constance to cheat. Meanwhile, Milligan is sent to retrieve a letter from Mr. Benedict's old study that contains pictures and information about Curtain and Benedict and has to hide from agents of Curtain, who are placing cameras in the house. Reynie is called to Mr. Curtain's office and meets his adoptive son, known as S.Q, who has a passion for drawing. He and Curtain eat together, and the headmaster advises him to trust no one, not even his friends. Kate and Constance sneak out at night searching for information on the transmissions but are caught by Jackson and Jillson. Back at Stonetown, Ms. Perumal gets suspicious about Reynie's whereabouts and schedules a meeting with the headmaster of Boatwright Academy.
4	4	"A Whisper, Not a Shout"	Wendey Stanzler	James Rogers III	July 9, 2021
The children devise a plan for cheating for the next exam and try to read part of Mr Curtain's journal. In Stonetown, Number Two follows Rhonda and learns that she is writing messages on walls inciting to fight the Emergency. This causes a feud between the two women, their respective philosophies of uptightness and recklessness clashing when it comes to decision-making. Sticky gets caught giving answers to Kate via Morse Code during a test and is sent to an anxiety-inducing Waiting Room. The three others worry for him, Kate having flunked her test and Constance having started trying in school and acing her test. Mr Benedict and Milligan go on a mission to spy on Mr Curtain. They eventually discover a potential base for Curtain's activities. Sticky talks with the headmaster without revealing that he was helping Kate, and gets sent to the Waiting Room for the rest of the day. Once Sticky comes back, Constance reveals that she has decoded Mr Curtain's journal, using a rotational Caesar Cipher. They find out that Benedict, Number Two, Milligan, and Rhonda are all on a list of potential enemies to mindsweep. The next morning, the student ratings show that Constance is not in danger anymore, but Kate is to be barged. Additionally, Mr Curtain enters Mr Oshiro's class to promote Reynie and Sticky as Messengers. While leaving, Kate plays a game of tetherball with Martina Crowe. Martina, impressed by her skills, convinces the headmaster to let Kate stay at school, to join the tetherball team, in a probationary scholarship of sorts. Constance starts to hear voices that may have to do with the Emergency. Due to her hypersensitivity, she alone hears them.
5	5	"The Art of Conveyance and Round-Trippery"	Karyn Kusama	Taylor Mallory	July 16, 2021
The children receive an encoded message from Mr. Benedict telling them where to find the secret passageway. After being invited to sit at the Messenger-only table, Reynie and Sticky are alerted that Jackson and Jillson have seen flickering lights near the channel, and they realize that their method of communication can no longer be used. The kids manage to alert Mr. Benedict about the discovery without getting caught. Kate and Constance manage to find and enter the secret passageway, and after narrowly avoiding getting caught, they discover that Mr. Curtain is planning to launch something big tomorrow, called the "farm and the forest". Ms. Perumal manages to find Mr. Benedict and his associates and questions them about Reynie's whereabouts. After being questioned, Mr Benedict decides to collect the children the following day. For their Messenger duty, Reynie and Sticky are led to the Whisperer, a machine invented by Mr. Curtain. After repeating a series of phrases, their voices are sent out as subliminal messages, which Constance can hear. The four kids realize they have to disable the Whisperer without getting caught.
6	6	"Run Silent, Run Deep"	Greg Beeman	Todd Slavkin & Darren Swimmer	July 23, 2021
30 years before, Curtain and Benedict are in an orphanage performing in a play, hoping to impress people so they can get adopted. However, Benedict is the only one that gets adopted, and betrays his brother by not asking his parents to adopt him. In the present, Benedict sends Milligan to rescue the children. Milligan travels in a submarine, but crashes in the bottom of the lake. Sticky is again led to the Whisperer, and starts acting strangely. Dr Curtain is impressed by Sticky's results, so he tells Sticky he will be spending a lot more time in the Whisperer. Sticky's subliminal messages tell people to buy blue berets. Constance investigates this and manages to retrieve a beret. S.Q. leads Reynie to the forest, which is composed of fake trees with large antennas attached. Kate befriends Martina, and manages to copy her keycard which gives her executive access to the farm, which is a server room. Sticky and the other kids fight, which leads to Kate trying to enter the farm by herself.
7	7	"The Dance of the Celestial Orb"	Shannon Kohli	Todd Slavkin & Darren Swimmer	July 30, 2021
Kate tries to enter the server room but is forced to escape after Jackson and Jillson discover an intruder. While escaping, Kate falls off a cliff. Sticky realizes that he was the one that caused Kate to be in trouble, and turns back to normal. Having survived the submarine crash, Milligan rescues Kate and tells her that he was ordered to take the kids home. Reynie is called in for questioning to Dr. Curtain's office, who believes that he is the intruder. However, Curtain's men believe that it was Martina because Kate copied her keycard. Martina believes that someone framed her and that Kate is the only one she can trust because she is the only person who is nice to her. Ms. Perumal comes back and tells Mr. Benedict that she believes him after seeing a crowd of people, including her mother, being mind controlled into buying the berets. Ms. Perumal informs him of this, and gives him a letter to send to Reynie, which the falcon flies away with. S.Q. discovers the letter, and Reynie convinces him to not tell his father. Jackson and Jillson discover Mr. Benedict's location, but he escapes in a hot air balloon, and goes to help the children. After investigating, Martina discovers that it was Kate who broke into the server room.
8	8	"Big Day Today"	Mark Tonderai	Phil Hay & Matt Manfredi	August 6, 2021
Mr. Benedict, Rhonda and Number Two arrive on the island. Martina outs Kate's involvement in breaking into the server room, but Kate tells Dr. Curtain to leave Martina alone and is ordered to be brain swept, though Constance saves her. Milligan remembers that he was once a scientist and that Dr. Curtain was indeed the one who erased his memory. Sticky is called to the Whisperer, but fights it this time. Kate has Constance go up the tower with Milligan and soon Martina and the tetherball team fight off Dr. Curtain's bodyguards. Reynie tries to make a joke so that Dr. Curtain laughs and falls asleep, but he does not have the same narcolepsy as Mr. Benedict. Reynie instead makes him vulnerable, which makes him angry and thus falls asleep. As Kate arrives, Constance uses her stubbornness to confuse and destroy the Whisperer. Mr. Benedict arrives in time and converses with his brother; both angry at the other for their actions. Dr. Curtain tricks Mr. Benedict into falling asleep and escapes with S.Q. and Dr. Garrison. Milligan realizes that he is Kate's father and they reconnect, Sticky speaks with his aunt and decides to attend Boatwright Academy, Ms. Perumal adopts Reynie, Constance decides to live with Mr. Benedict, though she refuses to get adopted, and Rhonda and Number Two become better friends. Elsewhere, Dr. Garrison presents Dr. Curtain with a new plan.

=== Season 2 (2022) ===
No. overall	No. in season	Title	Directed by	Written by	Original release date
9	1	"A Perilous Journey"	James Bobin	Phil Hay & Matt Manfredi	October 25, 2022
Dr. Curtain has taken credit for ending the Emergency and has started a new plan of forced happiness on people. He kidnaps Mr. Benedict and Number Two as they are planting clues for a scavenger hunt for the kids and takes them to his secret compound. The kids are reunited at Mr. Benedict's house but are informed of Mr. Benedict and Number Two's disappearance, thus canceling the scavenger hunt. Wanting to find and save Mr. Benedict, the kids decide to continue with the hunt anyway and find clues around the mansion that tell them to take a cruise ship called the Shortcut. They sneak away, just as Rhonda, Milligan and Ms. Perumal find out that the children are missing. Without their cruise tickets, the children are forced to sneak aboard the ship. The adults arrive too late, as the Shortcut has taken off without them.
10	2	"A Bit of Light Chop"	Craig Zisk	Heather Jeng Bladt	October 25, 2022
Mr. Benedict and Number Two try to look for an escape from the compound. Mr. Benedict learns that Dr. Curtain's method for happiness involves sending neurological messages into people's minds, making them uncontrollably happy. Rhonda, Milligan and Ms. Perumal board a dirigible to meet up with the kids. The kids search the ship for clues, but catch the attention of an officer known as Cannonball, who informs his friend and superior Captain Noland that there are stowaways onboard. The kids find the room that they were supposed to be staying in, but it is occupied by a couple on their honeymoon. They manage to enter when the couple is away and find that the next clue is at a train station at Lisbon, their next destination. Just as Cannonball discovers that the kids are the stowaways, a group of water poloists, with whom Kate had interacted earlier, find the room the kids were staying in and kick down the door.
11	3	"A Gold Bar in Fort Knox"	Craig Zisk	Taylor Chukwu	November 1, 2022
The children manage to escape the poloists and get down to the engine room where they take part in gambling. Sticky, Constance and Kate cheat to earn their winnings, but Reynie convinces them to return them. The head engineer rewards them for their honesty by giving them money. They are nearly caught by the poloists only for Cannonball to get them first. Number Two manages to escape the compound aboard a pie truck while Mr. Benedict stays behind to understand his brother's scheme. He sits in on a televised special Dr. Curtain is hosting and supposedly falls victim to his happiness. Milligan, Ms. Perumal and Rhonda's dirigible is forced to make an emergency landing following a storm. The children reveal to Captain Noland that the ship is not moving at max speed and make a deal to fix it on the condition that he help them get past Libson customs. They arrive faster than usual and outwit the poloists again by having them arrested before grabbing a taxi to escape Dr. Curtain's henchman Jeffers.
12	4	"Free of Pointless Command"	Kabir Akhtar	Angeli Millan	November 8, 2022
The children are forced to pay the Cabbie with a necklace that Constance had on her, only for them to learn that it was necessary to continue their search for Mr. Benedict. Kate swindles the Cabbie with another object of hers and the kids discover that their next destination is Burggrub, Germany. After the dirigible lands, Ms. Perumal finds a motorcycle at a nearby farm and she, Rhonda, and Milligan ride off to Lisbon to look for the children. Under the influence of the happiness method, Mr. Benedict tells Dr. Curtain that he approves of his motives and agrees to try and convert Number Two. Number Two makes it outside and asks the police for help, but find her claims of Dr. Curtain's villainy incredulous. She returns to the compound and discovers that Mr. Benedict has been converted. Dr. Curtain's assistants, Jackson and Jillson, find that people using the method are becoming immobile and unresponsive. A doctor is called in, but cannot determine the problem. Jeffers and the Gray Men locate the children and chase them, but they get away. They spot the poloists and learn that they are not in league with Dr. Curtain. The children decide to take turns keeping watch for the night, but Sticky dozes off and awakens to find that Constance is missing.
13	5	"Blank Expression"	Dawn Wilkinson	Todd Slavkin & Darren Swimmer	November 15, 2022
Constance is revealed to have been kidnapped by Dr. Garrison, who was blamed for the Emergency, due to Dr. Curtain taking her happiness method without further testing. Dr. Garrison hopes to have Constance recreate what destroyed the Whisperer to improve on it, but she turns the tables on her by breaking her down emotionally. Kate calls upon Martina Crowe who picks her, Reynie and Sticky up to help look for Constance. Milligan and Ms. Perumal continue their search for the children, but are captured by Dr. Curtain's Gray Men. Rhonda goes to search for who has been buying the elements needed for the Whisperer. Mr. Benedict is still convinced that he can turn Dr. Curtain, but Number Two realizes that he is still under the effects of the method and informs him that they will simply kidnap Dr. Curtain and escape with him. More of Dr. Curtain's followers begin succumbing to the having "blank expressions". The kids find Constance, but Dr. Garrison has her mercenaries surround them.
14	6	"Commitment to All Things Cozy"	Lena Khan	James Rogers III	November 22, 2022
Rhonda, Ms. Perumal and Milligan arrive to rescue the children as Dr. Garrison tells them where Dr. Curtain's compound is. They are forced to split up where Rhonda and Reynie escape by motorcycle, Martina, Kate and Milligan escape by van and Ms. Perumal distracts the Gray Men so that Sticky and Constance can escape. Sticky and Constance find a Danish inn run by a friendly couple whom Constance is rude towards. She turns the TV on and gets converted by Dr. Curtain's method. Both children are captured by the Gray Men. Martina tells Kate to go easier on her dad as Rhonda and Reynie reunite with them. Martina manages to steal keys from Jackson and Jillson to give to the group, but is forced to leave due to her van theft. Jackson and Jillson finally reveal the immobilized people to Dr. Curtain, but he is in denial over it being the result of the method. Mr. Benedict becomes reluctant to drug his brother for the kidnapping and as he stalls, Dr. Curtain's protégé Auguste uses the happiness method on Number Two.
15	7	"A Joyful Lens"	Aprill Winney	Todd Slavkin & Darren Swimmer	November 29, 2022
Number Two gets converted while Rhonda, Milligan and Ms. Perumal also fall victim to Dr. Curtain's method. Sticky is nearly converted, but distracts himself by performing long division in his head. The kids reunite and learn what happened. Having stolen Dr. Garrison's notes, they discover that a flash of light can change them back and they make a small viewfinder. Mr. Benedict learns about the side effects and becomes concerned. The kids manage to use their invention on Rhonda, Milligan, Ms. Perumal and Number Two, returning them to normal, but Jackson and Jillson supposedly prevent them from using it on Mr. Benedict and destroy the device. Everyone regroups as Kate and Milligan knock out and kidnap Dr. Curtain. As everyone escapes in a delivery truck, Mr. Benedict begins to show symptoms.
16	8	"A Two-Way Street"	Tara Nicole Weyr	Phil Hay & Matt Manfredi	December 6, 2022
The group arrive at Number Two's family's house, where they have a lukewarm reunion. Mr. Benedict finally confronts Dr. Curtain on his behavior and after faking an episode, revealing that he used the flash device before it broke, has Dr. Curtain finally admit that he was wrong and cares about him. The Gray Men, Jackson and Jillson arrive to liberate Dr. Curtain, but he tells them to all leave. Constance succumbs to the method's effects, but the rest of the kids manage to snap her out of it by annoying her (she shows her affection by insulting them). Dr. Curtain, now knowing the cure, decides to head back to the compound to help those he affected. Number Two's family finally accept her path in life as everyone returns home. Constance finally asks Mr. Benedict to help look for her parents while Dr. Curtain arrives to inform them that he will be joining the Society before revealing that they have a sister.

== Production ==
=== Development ===
It was announced in September 2019 that a series order for an adaptation of the Trenton Lee Stewart fantasy book series of the same name was close to completion at Hulu. Phil Hay and Matt Manfredi wrote the pilot episode with James Bobin set to direct. Todd Slavkin and Darren Swimmer were set as showrunners for the series. In November 2020, the series was moved to Disney+. In February 2021, it was announced that the series would consist of eight episodes and premiere on June 25, 2021. In July 2021, Hay and Manfredi said that, should the series be renewed for future seasons, they would incorporate and combine elements from the book series instead of each season being straight adaptations. On September 28, 2021, Disney+ renewed the series for a second season. On January 29, 2023, Disney+ canceled the series after two seasons.

=== Casting ===
Tony Hale was cast in February 2020 to portray twin brothers Mr. Benedict and Mr. Curtain. Kristen Schaal, MaameYaa Boafo, Ryan Hurst, Gia Sandhu, Mystic Inscho, Seth Carr, Emmy DeOliveira, and Marta Kessler were added as series regulars, playing Number Two, Rhonda, Milligan, Ms. Perumal, Reynie Muldoon, George 'Sticky' Washington, Kate Wetherall, and Constance Contraire, respectively, in April. Upon learning that he had gotten the role, Inscho said that he was "thrilled" and felt that the casting "made all of the hard work and efforts [he] put in worth it."

=== Writing ===
About playing both Benedict and Curtain and differentiating the characters, Hale noted that reading the books showed him "just how affable Mr. Benedict is — he comes from a place of compassion and love. And then Curtain, you hear more of their backstory as the show goes, but he's got a tremendous amount of pain and trauma — he's also very misunderstood." He described Benedict as an "erratic and befuddled" person with terrible posture, which was fun for Hale to portray. He also enjoyed working with Trenton Lee Stewart, saying, "Working with a writer like that, and just how many twists and turns he puts in the series, that is just candy for an actor. It's just so fun to work with." On playing Curtain, Hale elaborated, "It would have been easy to play the idea of an evil twin. But I wanted to find parts of him with which I resonated: his humanity, mainly. He probably feels misunderstood and this comes from his own pain." Hale also added that the character would not be the same if it were not for the hair, costume, and makeup put in to his overall getup. He finds parts of the characters that are like himself in order to play the role properly.

Inscho noted in an interview that the themes he hoped viewers would take away from watching the series would be those of family and friendship, while Carr hoped they would take away the message that "the impossible is possible". Regarding his character, Carr said what he admires most is George's empathy, saying, "I feel like his empathy plays a big part in him caring for others when others didn't really care for him. So, I feel like, in a way, he's kind of like a lone wolf until he found his buddies." In another interview, DeOliveira said that the character of Kate Wetherall is "really fun, she is stubborn, adventurous, brave, and independent" and complemented her "willingness to just go for it, she doesn't always think everything through, but she is not afraid to just jump in." Speaking to her character's story arc in the series and commenting on whether the viewers might see more of her character in content to come, actor Gia Sandhu noted that Ms. Perumal "surprises herself in how much she realises she cares for Reynard. She depends on him a lot more than she expects in the beginning."

=== Filming ===
Filming was initially set to begin in mid 2020 in British Columbia, but was delayed due to the COVID-19 pandemic. It officially began filming on August 26, with scenes shot at Gastown, Vancouver in November. Filming concluded on January 19, 2021. Filming for the second season relocated to California with the state's film and TV tax credits program.

=== Visual effects ===
Folks VFX provide the visual effects for the series. Philippe Thibault serves as visual effects supervisor. He described working on the series as "making eight little movies". Thibault read the original books, and "stressed the importance of respecting the origin of this beautiful story." The CG team, led by Gabriel Beauvais. They created their own tools within Houdini, and worked to incorporate real locations and buildings with the computer generated buildings without it being noticeable.

=== Music ===
Theodore Shapiro and Joseph Shirley compose the series' music. The soundtrack of The Mysterious Benedict Society includes multiple classic rock songs. Screenwriter Phil Hay noted that they "had this idea together that this is a type of music that we love that has a real specific place. That sort of '70s AM power pop, we sort of realized in a strange collision of all the stuff in this, visually and storywise, that this world, that's what people listen to in our mind. That's the kind of music people love."

== Marketing ==
Disney released a trailer for the series on May 20, 2021, as well as promotional art and teaser images.

== Release ==
The series debuted on June 25, 2021, with a two episode premiere. It consisted of 8 episodes, and ran until August 6, 2021. The second season premiered on October 26, 2022, with two episodes.

The series made its linear premiere on Disney Channel on October 25, 2022, airing the second season before Disney+, with further airings every Tuesday starting on November 1, 2022. The entire first season was also uploaded to the Disney Now app and Disney Channel's On Demand service.

On May 26, 2023, the series was removed from Disney+ & Disney Channel due to cost-cutting measures.

On October 5, 2025, the full series was made available on Wonder Project via Amazon Prime Video in the United States.

== Reception ==
=== Critical reception ===
On Rotten Tomatoes, the series holds an approval rating of 86% based on 22 critic reviews, with an average rating of 7.90/10. The website's critics consensus reads, "The Mysterious Benedict Society has a slow windup, but its delightful supporting cast and sparky tone make for winning family entertainment." On Metacritic, it has a weighted average score of 66 out of 100, based on 7 critics, indicating "generally favorable reviews".

Daniel D'Addario of Variety gave the show a positive review and stated, "Within the growing set of shows about kids asked to save the world, The Mysterious Benedict Society stands out, and might itself save a rainy weekend for curious kids sometime this summer." Joel Keller of Decider gave the show a positive review and stated that it was "smart without being overly precious, but is just weird enough to keep kids' attention." Petrana Radulovic of Polygon gave the show a positive review and stated that it "has all the components a great kid classic needs." Josh Bell of CBR gave the show a positive review and stated, "The characters are distinctive and appealing enough to keep The Mysterious Benedict Society engaging even in its slower early stages." James Croot of Stuff.co.nz gave the show a positive review and stated that it was "brightly coloured, bold and bravura in its execution."

Ashley Moulton of Common Sense Media gave the show five out of five and an '8+' age rating, stating "Everything about it is superb -- its acting, storytelling, and wonderfully immersive dystopian world." Kristen Lopez of IndieWire gave the show a 'B+' and stated, "Manfredi and Hay aren't afraid to create a series that both praises the intelligence of children while also admitting that being a kid is weird and confusing." Joseph Stanichar of Paste gave the show 7.5 out of 10 and stated, "Even though the children's performances fell a bit short, I hope that they'll grow on me throughout the series. For now, the promise of Hale's dual roles and seeing how future scenes will be presented is more than enough to convince me to keep watching." Nick Spacek of Starburst gave the show 4 out of 5 and stated, "Rather than being something for children with a few jokes the grown-ups will appreciate, it has the same youthful joie de vivre as a film like Moonrise Kingdom, but with the vivacity and energy of Spy Kids." Joanne Soh of The New Paper gave the show 4 out of 5 and stated, "Hale may be brilliant as the narcoleptic genius, but the child actors are the real heroes, especially the scene-stealing Kessler." Brad Newsome of The Sydney Morning Herald gave the show 3.5 out of 5 and stated, "Based on the novel by Trenton Lee Stewart, and with a quirky tone set by producer-director James Bobin (Flight of the Conchords), it should captivate its intended audience." Lucy Mangan of The Guardian gave the show 3 out of 5 and stated, "What could have offered children a chance to understand the historically unprecedented aspects of the internet age they live in, made the young fish conscious of the water they swim in, is left simply as a romp."

Nick Allen of RogerEbert.com gave the show a negative review and stated, "The first two episodes have a start-and-stop energy, with more tests leading to more tests, and it gets more and more tedious." Dan Fienberg of The Hollywood Reporter gave the show a negative review and stated, "There could be potential here, but not enough to build real enthusiasm."

=== Accolades ===
Year	Award	Category	Nominee(s)	Result	Ref.
2022	20th Visual Effects Society Awards	Outstanding Supporting Visual Effects in a Photoreal Episode	Philippe Thibault, Marie-Pierre Boucher, Alexis Belanger, Gabriel Beauvais (for "A Bunch of Smart Orphans")	Nominated	
2022	Children's and Family Emmy Awards	Outstanding Young Teen Series	James Bobin, David Ellender, Phil Hay, Matt Loze, Matt Manfredi, Deepak Nayar, Karen Kehela Sherwood, Todd Slavkin, Darren Swimmer, Jamie Tarses (executive producers); Greg Beeman, Grace Gilroy, Chelsey Lora (co-executive producers); Tony Hale (producer)	Nominated	
2022	Children's and Family Emmy Awards	Outstanding Directing for a Single Camera Program	James Bobin, Greg Beeman, Shannon Kohli, Karyn Kusama, Wendey Stanzler, Mark Tonderai and Glen Winter	Won	
2022	Children's and Family Emmy Awards	Outstanding Writing for a Young Teen Program	Phil Hay, Chelsey Lora, Taylor Mallory, Matt Manfredi, James Rogers III, Todd Slavkin and Darren Swimmer	Nominated	
2022	Children's and Family Emmy Awards	Outstanding Music Direction and Composition for a Live Action Program	Theodore Shapiro, Joseph Shirley	Nominated	
2022	Children's and Family Emmy Awards	Outstanding Cinematography for a Live Action Single-Camera Program	Francois Dagenais	Nominated	
2022	Children's and Family Emmy Awards	Outstanding Editing for a Single Camera Program	David E.K. Abramson	Nominated	
2022	Children's and Family Emmy Awards	Outstanding Sound Mixing and Sound Editing for a Live Action Program	Ian Tarasoff, Christian Cooke, Kirk Lynds, Joe Bracciale, Danielle McBride, Kevin Banks, MPSE, Bryan Carrigan, Tyler Whitham and Gerald Trepy	Nominated	
2022	Children's and Family Emmy Awards	Outstanding Visual Effects for a Live Action Program	Moika Sabourin, Philippe Thibault, Marie-Pierre Boucher, Roberto Lobel, Jeremy Lambolez	Nominated	
2022	Children's and Family Emmy Awards	Outstanding Main Title and Graphics	Aaron Bjork, Michael Riley, Bob Swensen, Penelope Nederlander	Nominated	
2022	Children's and Family Emmy Awards	Outstanding Art Direction/Set Decoration/Scenic Design	Michael Wylie, Marshall McMahen, Ide Foyle	Nominated	
2022	Children's and Family Emmy Awards	Outstanding Costume Design/Styling	Catherine Adair	Won	
2022	Directors Guild of America	Outstanding Directorial Achievement in Children's Programs	James Bobin	Nominated	
2022	Leo Awards	Best Direction in a Youth or Children's Program or Series	Shannon Kohli	Won	
2022	Leo Awards	Best Cinematography in a Youth or Children's Program or Series	François Dagenais	Won	
2022	Young Artist Awards	Best Performance in a Streaming Series Role: Teen Actor	Ricardo Ortiz	Won	
2023	Children's and Family Emmy Awards	Outstanding Young Teen Series	The Mysterious Benedict Society	Nominated	
2023	Children's and Family Emmy Awards	Outstanding Lead Performance in a Preschool, Children's or Young Teen Program	Tony Hale	Won	
2023	Children's and Family Emmy Awards	Outstanding Younger Performer in a Preschool, Children's or Young Teen Program	Marta Kessler	Nominated	
2023	Children's and Family Emmy Awards	Outstanding Directing for a Single Camera Program	Kabir Akhtar, James Bobin, Lena Khan, Tara Nicole Weyr, Dawn Wilkinson, April Winney, Craig Zisk	Nominated	
2023	Children's and Family Emmy Awards	Outstanding Writing for a Young Teen Program	Taylor Chukwu, Phil Hay, Heather Jeng Bladt, Matt Manfredi, Angeli Millan, James Rogers III, Todd Slavkin, Darren Swimmer	Nominated	
2023	Children's and Family Emmy Awards	Outstanding Art Direction/Set Decoration/Scenic Design	Cynthia Charette, Nathan Ogilvie, Amber Haley	Won	
2023	Children's and Family Emmy Awards	Outstanding Cinematography for a Live Action Single-Camera Program	Christopher Baffa	Nominated	
2023	Children's and Family Emmy Awards	Outstanding Main Title and Graphics	Aaron Bjork, Michael Riley, Bob Swensen, Penelope Nederlander	Nominated	
2023	Children's and Family Emmy Awards	Outstanding Music Direction and Composition for a Live Action Program	Garett Gonzales, Siddhartha Khosla and Theodore Shapiro	Nominated	
