= Trenton Lee Stewart =

American author (born 1970)

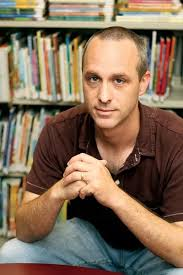
- Born: May 27, 1970 (age 56); Hot Springs, Arkansas
- Education: Hendrix College; Iowa Writers' Workshop (MFA)
- Occupation: Novelist
- Writing career
- Genre: Children's literature
- Notable work: The Mysterious Benedict Society series
- Notable awards: Porter Prize (2008)

Trenton Lee Stewart (born May 27, 1970) is an American author best known for the Mysterious Benedict Society series. Stewart is a graduate of Hendrix College and the Iowa Writers' Workshop. He lives in Little Rock, Arkansas.

== Life and career ==
Trenton Lee Stewart was born on May 27, 1970, to Jerry and Sandi Stewart, and he grew up in Hot Springs, Arkansas. In 1992, Stewart received a bachelor's degree in English from Hendrix College. Afterwards he attended the University of Iowa's Writers' Workshop, receiving his Master of Fine Arts in creative writing in 1995. Stewart taught at the Iowa Summer Writing Festival and, after moving to Cincinnati, at the Miami University of Ohio in 2005. After that he returned to Arkansas in 2006.He is married to Sara Beth Estes and has 2 kids.

Stewart's first novels were published during this time: Flood Summer in 2005 and The Mysterious Benedict Society in 2007, the latter remaining on The New York Times Best Seller list for over a year.

Two more books were completed in the series: The Mysterious Benedict Society and the Perilous Journey in 2008, and The Mysterious Benedict Society and the Prisoner's Dilemma in 2009, both of which appeared on The New York Times Best Seller list. In 2012, a bestselling prequel to the series, The Extraordinary Education of Nicholas Benedict, was published, and 2016 saw the release of Stewart's The Secret Keepers, a stand-alone novel for young readers that was also a bestseller.

Stewart was a Murphy Visiting Writer-in-Residence and taught a Writing Fiction course at Hendrix College in the spring of 2019. His latest novel, The Mysterious Benedict Society and the Riddle of Ages, was published September 24, 2019.

Stewart also contributes crosswords to The New York Times.

== Bibliography ==
- Flood Summer: A Novel (2005)
- The Mysterious Benedict Society (2007)
- The Mysterious Benedict Society and the Perilous Journey (2008)
- The Mysterious Benedict Society and the Prisoner's Dilemma (2009)
- The Mysterious Benedict Society: Mr. Benedict's Book of Perplexing Puzzles, Elusive Enigmas, and Curious Conundrums (2011)
- The Extraordinary Education of Nicholas Benedict (2012)
- The Secret Keepers (2016)
- The Mysterious Benedict Society and the Riddle of Ages (2019)
- Secret Keepers Zeit der Späher (2019)
