= Seth Carr =

American actor

- Occupation: Actor
- Years active: 2013–present

Seth Banee Carr is an American actor. He is known for his role as young Killmonger in the film Black Panther (2018) and for his first leading role on Netflix‘s film The Main Event (2020).

== Filmography ==
=== Film ===
Year	Title	Role
2013	Her	747 Boy
2015	Terminator Genisys	Young Boy
2018	Black Panther	Young Killmonger
2018	Breaking In	Glover Russell
2020	The Main Event	Leo

=== Television ===
Year	Title	Role	Notes
2014	Ray Donovan	Cookie's Son / Alfonse	One episode
2015	Days of Our Lives	Randy	One episode
2015	Hot in Cleveland	Charlie	One episode
2016	Code Black	Zane Jacobson	One episode
2016–2017	Brooklyn Nine-Nine	Young Holt	Three episodes
2017	Superstore	T’oliver	One episode
2017	Bosch	Joe Edgar	Seven episodes
2018–2019	Knight Squad	Fizzwick	
2019	Free Rein	Aaron	Ten episodes
2019	9-1-1	Leo	One episode
2021–2022	The Mysterious Benedict Society	George ‘Sticky’ Washington	Main role
2022	Oni: Thunder God's Tale	Calvin	Voice; Main role
