= The Breadwinner (novel) =

2001 novel by Deborah Ellis

- First edition
- Author: Deborah Ellis
- Genre: Children's literature
- Publisher: Groundwood Books
- Publication date: 2001
- Pages: 170
- ISBN: 978-0-88899-416-5
- OCLC: 47120972
- Followed by: Parvana's Journey

The Breadwinner, is a children's novel by Deborah Ellis, first published in 2001. As of October 2013, the English-language edition of the book has had a run of 39 editions. The title of the book refers to the role of the protagonist, 11-year-old Parvana, who is forced by circumstances to be the breadwinner for her family during the Afghan Civil War (1996–2001).

For her research, the author spent several months interviewing women and girls in refugee camps in Pakistan, and used these interviews as the basis of her depiction of life in Afghanistan. The book has received several literary awards, including the Peter Pan Prize and the Middle East Book Award in 2002. The novel was followed by four sequels, Parvana's Journey in 2002, Mud City in 2003, My Name is Parvana in 2012 and One More Mountain in 2022.

== Plot ==
Parvana is an 11-year-old girl who lives in Kabul, Afghanistan with her mother Fatana, her father Nurullah, her bossy older sister Nooria, her cheerful younger sister Maryam and her baby brother Ali. Taliban soldiers enter her house and arrest her father for having a foreign education. Parvana and her mother go to the local jail and beg for her father to be freed, but the guards beat them for being so outspoken. Soon after, her mother becomes depressed and will not move from her toshak (thin mattress). Because Parvana's father can no longer work, her family situation becomes dire, as women in Afghanistan are not allowed to travel outside the home unless accompanied by a related male.

Parvana meets with Mrs. Weera, a former physical education teacher, who comes to stay with Parvana's family to help Parvana's depressed mother and take charge of the household. Eventually, Parvana's mother begins to feel better and joins Mrs. Weera and a group of women to write the Afghanistan National Magazine, smuggling it to and from Pakistan so it can be published.

Her mother and Mrs. Weera decide to disguise Parvana as a boy by cutting her hair and dressing her in her deceased brother Hossain's old clothes so that she can buy groceries. She also continues her father's business of reading and writing letters for illiterate people. Parvana runs into a girl who she used to go to school with named Shauzia. They start a business partnership. Although they were never close in school, they bond trying to figure out ways to earn more money. They come up with an idea of a portable "shop" by using trays to move their wares around. However, they must first obtain money to buy trays. They find a way to earn money by digging up bones from graves.

Throughout the book, Parvana grows closer to her older sister Nooria as well as the woman who appears in the window of a building close to where Parvana works. She throws small gifts onto Parvana's blanket from her window.

Nooria announces that she is leaving for Mazar-e-Sharif to marry a boy and to go to college. She leaves along with her mother and younger siblings, but Parvana stays as she looks like a boy and her appearance will be difficult to explain. Despite being against it at first, Parvana grows to accept her sister's decision.

Parvana remains in Kabul with Mrs. Weera. One day after work, she meets Homa, a runaway girl from Mazar-e-Sharif who is deeply upset. Parvana leads her home at night, and soon the girl, named Homa, tells them that Mazar-e-Sharif has been captured by the Taliban. Homa's family had been murdered by the Taliban, and she had been extremely lucky to escape. Mrs. Weera gladly takes her in, and Parvana is very worried since the rest of her family is in Mazar.

One day, Parvana's father returns home, but he is in bad shape. Mrs. Weera, Homa, and Parvana nurse him back to health, and Parvana and her father leave for Mazar, hidden in the back of a truck, to search for their family in the refugee camps. Shauzia, who had been planning to run away from her family so that she would not have to marry, tells Parvana that she will also be leaving with some nomads. Parvana and Shauzia make a pact to meet with each other 20 years later in France, at the top of the Eiffel Tower in Paris.

== Film adaptation ==
The Breadwinner was adapted into an animated film, directed by Nora Twomey, that was released on November 17, 2017.
