= The Mysterious Benedict Society and the Riddle of Ages =

2019 children's novel

- Author: Trenton Lee Stewart
- Illustrator: Manu Montoya
- Language: English
- Series: The Mysterious Benedict Society
- Genre: Children's
- Publisher: Little, Brown
- Publication date: September 24, 2019
- Publication place: United States
- Pages: 400
- ISBN: 9780316452649
- OCLC: 1121044268
- LC Class: PZ7.S8513 Mym 2019
- Preceded by: The Mysterious Benedict Society and the Prisoner's Dilemma

The Mysterious Benedict Society and the Riddle of Ages is a 2019 children's novel written by Trenton Lee Stewart and illustrated by Manu Montoya. It is the fourth book in the Mysterious Benedict Society series, following The Mysterious Benedict Society and the Prisoner's Dilemma (2009).

== Plot ==
This takes place some years after the third book. Reynie, Sticky, Kate, and Constance are back at Mr. Benedict's home, just like old times. However, things seem to be conflicting the three older members. Reynie has received letters from numerous prestigious universities, Sticky has been offered the position to run the most important science lab in the world, and Kate is training to become a secret agent, just like her father, Milligan. In the midst of trying to figure out how to grow up, and figuring out if they should leave the nest, Constance has also gotten older, and she's feeling left out. Her telepathic abilities have evolved, so much so, that she led another telepath right to Stonetown. She's also having to ward off the "Listener", the one Helper that Mr. Benedict didn't restore their memories too, and who the Ten Men are using to try to capture the Mysterious Benedict Society. The Ten Men are on the loose trying to free Mr. Curtain, Mr. Benedict has been trapped in Mr. Curtain's security suite at the K.E.E.P (The Key Enclosure for Enemies of the Public), and they have to protect a little five year old named Tai Li, who was the telepath Constance led to Stonetown.

The Listener is revealed as Tai Li’s aunt, Dr. Claire Li.

== Reception ==
Kirkus Reviews called the book "Clever as ever—if slow off the mark—and positively laden with tics, quirks, and puns." A reviewer from National Review described the book as "intense and engrossing," but also calls it "an unnecessary story", criticizing the handling of themes about growing up. American Booksellers Association named The Mysterious Benedict Society and the Riddle of Ages one of their ABC Best Books for Young Readers in 2019.
