= List of accolades received by Soul (2020 film) =

Soul accolades
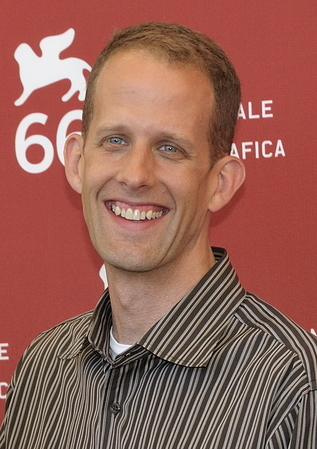
- Pete Docter received several awards and nominations for his direction.
Awards and nominations
Award	Wins	Nominations
AACTA International Awards	0	1
Academy Awards	2	3
Alliance of Women Film Journalists Awards	2	2
American Cinema Editors Awards	1	1
American Film Institute Awards	1	1
Annie Awards	7	10
Art Directors Guild Awards	1	1
Artios Awards	1	1
Austin Film Critics Association Awards	1	2
Black Reel Awards	2	6
British Academy Film Awards	2	3
Chicago Film Critics Association	1	3
Cinema Audio Society Awards	1	1
Critics' Choice Movie Awards	1	1
Critics' Choice Super Awards	3	3
Florida Film Critics Circle Awards	2	3
Golden Globe Awards	2	2
Golden Reel Awards	1	1
Golden Trailer Awards	3	7
Grammy Awards	1	3
Hollywood Music in Media Awards	1	3
Houston Film Critics Society Awards	2	3
Hugo Awards	0	1
International Film Music Critics Association Awards	0	1
London Critics Circle Film Awards	0	1
Los Angeles Film Critics Association Awards	2	2
MTV Movie & TV Awards	0	1
NAACP Image Awards	4	9
National Board of Review	2	2
Nickelodeon Kids' Choice Awards	1	3
Online Film Critics Society Awards	2	3
Producers Guild of America Awards	1	1
San Diego Film Critics Society Awards	0	1
San Francisco Bay Area Film Critics Circle	2	2
Satellite Awards	0	2
St. Louis Gateway Film Critics Association Awards	2	2
Toronto Film Critics Association Awards	1	1
Visual Effects Society Awards	5	5
Washington D.C. Area Film Critics Association Awards	3	4

Totals (Note: Certain award groups do not simply award one winner. They acknowledge several different recipients, have runners-up, and have third place. Since this is a specific recognition and is different from losing an award, runner-up mentions are considered wins in this award tally. For simplification and to avoid errors, each award in this list has been presumed to have had a prior nomination.)
- Wins: 62
- Nominations: 104

Soul is a 2020 American animated film written and directed by Pete Docter. It features the voice of Jamie Foxx as Joe Gardner, a middle school music teacher who seeks to reunite his soul and his body after he unexpectedly dies before his big break as a jazz musician. Tina Fey also stars as the voice of 22, a soul with a pessimistic view of life that Gardner tries to inspire to go to Earth.

The film premiered at the London Film Festival on October 11, 2020, and was scheduled to be theatrically released on November 20. However, the feature was postponed due to the COVID-19 pandemic, with Soul being released direct-to-streaming on Disney+ on December 25, 2020, and in theaters in countries without the streaming service. As of May 2021, Soul has grossed $116.2 million at the worldwide box office. Rotten Tomatoes, a review aggregator, surveyed 360 reviews and judged 95% of them to be positive.

Soul garnered awards and nominations in various categories with particular recognition for its sound effects, musical score, and acting. It received three nominations at the 93rd Academy Awards, including Best Sound. The film won Best Animated Feature and Best Original Score. Soul won seven of ten nominations at the 48th Annie Awards. At the 74th British Academy Film Awards, it was nominated for Best Sound, and won Best Animated Film and Best Original Music. The film won three awards at the 1st Critics' Choice Super Awards, before garnering the Critics' Choice Movie Award for Best Score at the 26th ceremony. Soul won Best Animated Feature Film and Best Original Score at the 78th Golden Globe Awards. Various critic circles also picked Soul as the best animated feature film of the year. In addition, both the American Film Institute and the National Board of Review selected Soul as one of the top-ten films of 2020.

== Accolades ==
Accolades received by Soul (2020 film)
Award	Date of ceremony	Category	Recipient(s)	Result	Ref.
AACTA International Awards	March 5, 2021	Best Direction	Pete Docter	Nominated	
Academy Awards	April 25, 2021	Best Animated Feature	Pete Docter and Dana Murray	Won	
Academy Awards	April 25, 2021	Best Original Score	Trent Reznor, Atticus Ross, and Jon Batiste	Won	
Academy Awards	April 25, 2021	Best Sound	Ren Klyce, Coya Elliott, and David Parker	Nominated	
Alliance of Women Film Journalists Awards	January 4, 2021	Best Animated Feature Film	Soul	Won	
Alliance of Women Film Journalists Awards	January 4, 2021	Best Animated Female	Tina Fey	Won	
American Cinema Editors Awards	April 17, 2021	Best Edited Animated Feature Film	Kevin Nolting	Won	
American Film Institute Awards	February 26, 2021	Top 10 Films of the Year	Soul	Won (Note: This award does not have a single winner, but recognizes multiple films.)	
Annie Awards	April 16, 2021	Best Animated Feature	Soul	Won	
Annie Awards	April 16, 2021	Best FX – Feature	Tolga Göktekin, Carl Kaphan, Hiroaki Narita, Enrique Vila, and Kylie Wijsmuller	Won	
Annie Awards	April 16, 2021	Best Character Animation – Feature	Michal Makarewicz	Won	
Annie Awards	April 16, 2021	Best Character Design – Feature	Daniel López Muñoz	Nominated	
Annie Awards	April 16, 2021	Best Direction – Feature	Pete Docter and Kemp Powers	Nominated	
Annie Awards	April 16, 2021	Best Music – Feature	Trent Reznor, Atticus Ross, and Jon Batiste	Won	
Annie Awards	April 16, 2021	Best Production Design – Feature	Steve Pilcher, Albert Lozano, Paul Abadilla, and Bryn Imagire	Nominated	
Annie Awards	April 16, 2021	Best Storyboarding – Feature	Trevor Jimenez	Won	
Annie Awards	April 16, 2021	Best Writing – Feature	Pete Docter, Mike Jones, and Kemp Powers	Won	
Annie Awards	April 16, 2021	Best Editorial – Feature	Kevin Nolting, Gregory Amundson, Robert Grahamjones, and Amera Rizk	Won	
Art Directors Guild Awards	April 10, 2021	Excellence in Production Design for an Animated Film	Steve Pilcher	Won	
Artios Awards	April 15, 2021	Film Animation	Kevin Reher, Natalie Lyon, and Kate Hansen-Birnbaum	Won	
Austin Film Critics Association Awards	March 19, 2021	Best Animated Film	Soul	Nominated	
Austin Film Critics Association Awards	March 19, 2021	Best Score	Trent Reznor, Atticus Ross, and Jon Batiste	Won	
Black Reel Awards	April 11, 2021	Outstanding Film	Dana Murray	Nominated	
Black Reel Awards	April 11, 2021	Outstanding Screenplay, Adapted or Original	Pete Docter, Mike Jones, and Kemp Powers	Nominated	
Black Reel Awards	April 11, 2021	Outstanding Score	Trent Reznor, Atticus Ross, and Jon Batiste	Won	
Black Reel Awards	April 11, 2021	Outstanding Voice Performance	Angela Bassett	Nominated	
Black Reel Awards	April 11, 2021	Outstanding Voice Performance	Jamie Foxx	Won	
Black Reel Awards	April 11, 2021	Outstanding Voice Performance	Phylicia Rashad	Nominated	
British Academy Film Awards	April 11, 2021	Best Animated Film	Pete Docter and Dana Murray	Won	
British Academy Film Awards	April 11, 2021	Best Original Music	Jon Batiste, Trent Reznor, and Atticus Ross	Won	
British Academy Film Awards	April 11, 2021	Best Sound	Coya Elliott, Ren Klyce, and David Parker	Nominated	
Chicago Film Critics Association	December 21, 2020	Best Animated Film	Pete Docter and Dana Murray	Nominated	
Chicago Film Critics Association	December 21, 2020	Best Original Screenplay	Pete Docter, Mike Jones, and Kemp Powers	Nominated	
Chicago Film Critics Association	December 21, 2020	Best Original Score	Trent Reznor, Atticus Ross, and Jon Batiste	Won	
Cinema Audio Society Awards	April 17, 2021	Outstanding Achievement in Sound Mixing for a Motion Picture – Animated	Vincent Caro, Ren Klyce, David Parker, Atticus Ross, David Boucher, Bobby Johanson, and Scott Curtis	Won	
Critics' Choice Movie Awards	March 7, 2021	Best Score	Trent Reznor, Atticus Ross, and Jon Batiste	Won	
Critics' Choice Super Awards	January 10, 2021	Best Animated Movie	Soul	Won	
Critics' Choice Super Awards	January 10, 2021	Best Voice Actor in an Animated Movie	Jamie Foxx	Won	
Critics' Choice Super Awards	January 10, 2021	Best Voice Actress in an Animated Movie	Tina Fey	Won	
Florida Film Critics Circle Awards	December 21, 2020	Best Original Screenplay	Pete Docter, Mike Jones, and Kemp Powers	Nominated	
Florida Film Critics Circle Awards	December 21, 2020	Best Score	Trent Reznor, Atticus Ross, and Jon Batiste	Won	
Florida Film Critics Circle Awards	December 21, 2020	Best Animated Film	Soul	Won	
Golden Globe Awards	February 28, 2021	Best Animated Feature Film	Pete Docter, Kemp Powers and Dana Murray	Won	
Golden Globe Awards	February 28, 2021	Best Original Score	Trent Reznor, Atticus Ross, and Jon Batiste	Won	
Golden Reel Awards	April 16, 2021	Outstanding Achievement in Sound Editing – Feature Animation	Coya Elliott, Cheryl Nardi, Ren Klyce, Steve Orlando, Kimberly Patrick, Jonathan Stevens, Thom Brennan, Shelley Roden, John Roesch, and Dee Selby	Won	
Golden Trailer Awards	July 22, 2021	Best Animation/Family	"Chicken Soup" (The Hive)	Won	
Golden Trailer Awards	July 22, 2021	Best Animation/Family	"Live" (Rogue Planet)	Nominated	
Golden Trailer Awards	July 22, 2021	Best Animation/Family TV Spot	"In It" (Ignition Creative)	Nominated	
Golden Trailer Awards	July 22, 2021	Best Home Ent Animation/Family	"Target Wall" (Tiny Hero)	Nominated	
Golden Trailer Awards	July 22, 2021	Best Motion Poster	"Virtual Jazz Show" (ZEALOT)	Won	
Golden Trailer Awards	July 22, 2021	Best Animation TrailerByte for a Feature Film	"Virtual Jazz Show" (ZEALOT)	Won	
Golden Trailer Awards	July 22, 2021	Best BTS/EPK for a Feature Film (Under 2 Minutes)	"Live Soulfully — Passions" (ZEALOT)	Nominated	
Grammy Awards	April 3, 2022	Best Improvised Jazz Solo	Jon Batiste for "Bigger Than Us"	Nominated	
Grammy Awards	April 3, 2022	Best Jazz Instrumental Album	Jon Batiste for Jazz Selections: Music from and Inspired by Soul	Nominated	
Grammy Awards	April 3, 2022	Best Score Soundtrack for Visual Media	Jon Batiste, Trent Reznor, and Atticus Ross for Soul: Original Motion Picture Soundtrack	Won	
Hollywood Critics Association Awards	March 5, 2021	Best Picture	Soul	Nominated	
Hollywood Critics Association Awards	March 5, 2021	Best Animated or VFX Performance	Jamie Foxx	Nominated	
Hollywood Critics Association Awards	March 5, 2021	Best Animated or VFX Performance	Tina Fey	Nominated	
Hollywood Critics Association Awards	March 5, 2021	Best Animated Film	Soul	Nominated	
Hollywood Critics Association Awards	March 5, 2021	Best Score	Jon Batiste, Trent Reznor, and Atticus Ross	Won	
Hollywood Music in Media Awards	January 27, 2021	Best Original Score – Animated Film	Trent Reznor, Atticus Ross, and Jon Batiste	Won	
Hollywood Music in Media Awards	January 27, 2021	Outstanding Music Supervision – Film	Tom MacDougall	Nominated	
Hollywood Music in Media Awards	January 27, 2021	Best Soundtrack Album	Soul: Original Motion Picture Soundtrack	Nominated	
Houston Film Critics Society Awards	January 18, 2021	Best Picture	Soul	Nominated	
Houston Film Critics Society Awards	January 18, 2021	Best Animated Feature Film	Soul	Won	
Houston Film Critics Society Awards	January 18, 2021	Best Original Score	Trent Reznor and Atticus Ross	Won	
Hugo Awards	December 18, 2021	Best Dramatic Presentation, Long Form	Pete Docter, Mike Jones, Kemp Powers, and Dana Murray	Nominated	
International Film Music Critics Association Awards	February 18, 2021	Best Original Score for an Animated Film	Trent Reznor, Atticus Ross, and Jon Batiste	Nominated	
London Critics Circle Film Awards	February 7, 2021	Technical Achievement Award	Pete Docter	Nominated	
Los Angeles Film Critics Association Awards	December 20, 2020	Best Animated Film	Soul	Runner-up	
Los Angeles Film Critics Association Awards	December 20, 2020	Best Music	Trent Reznor and Atticus Ross	Won	
MTV Movie & TV Awards	May 16, 2021	Best Movie	Soul	Nominated	
NAACP Image Awards	March 27, 2021	Outstanding Animated Motion Picture	Soul	Won	
NAACP Image Awards	March 27, 2021	Outstanding Writing in a Motion Picture	Pete Docter, Kemp Powers, and Mike Jones	Nominated	
NAACP Image Awards	March 27, 2021	Outstanding Ensemble Cast in a Motion Picture	Soul	Nominated	
NAACP Image Awards	March 27, 2021	Outstanding Soundtrack/Compilation Album	Soul: Original Motion Picture Soundtrack	Won	
NAACP Image Awards	March 27, 2021	Outstanding Jazz Album – Instrumental	Music From and Inspired by Soul	Won	
NAACP Image Awards	March 27, 2021	Outstanding Character Voice Performance – Motion Picture	Ahmir-Khalib Thompson	Nominated	
NAACP Image Awards	March 27, 2021	Outstanding Character Voice Performance – Motion Picture	Angela Bassett	Nominated	
NAACP Image Awards	March 27, 2021	Outstanding Character Voice Performance – Motion Picture	Jamie Foxx	Won	
NAACP Image Awards	March 27, 2021	Outstanding Character Voice Performance – Motion Picture	Phylicia Rashad	Nominated	
National Board of Review	January 26, 2021	Best Animated Film	Pete Docter	Won	
National Board of Review	January 26, 2021	Top 10 Films	Soul	Won	
Nickelodeon Kids' Choice Awards	March 13, 2021	Favorite Animated Movie	Soul	Won	
Nickelodeon Kids' Choice Awards	March 13, 2021	Favorite Voice from an Animated Movie	Tina Fey	Nominated	
Nickelodeon Kids' Choice Awards	March 13, 2021	Favorite Voice from an Animated Movie	Jamie Foxx	Nominated	
Online Film Critics Society Awards	January 25, 2021	Best Picture	Soul	Nominated	
Online Film Critics Society Awards	January 25, 2021	Best Animated Film	Soul	Won	
Online Film Critics Society Awards	January 25, 2021	Best Original Score	Trent Reznor and Atticus Ross	Won	
Producers Guild of America Awards	March 24, 2021	Best Animated Motion Picture	Dana Murray	Won	
San Diego Film Critics Society Awards	January 11, 2021	Best Animated Film	Soul	Nominated	
San Francisco Bay Area Film Critics Circle	January 18, 2021	Best Animated Feature	Soul	Won	
San Francisco Bay Area Film Critics Circle	January 18, 2021	Best Original Score	Trent Reznor and Atticus Ross	Won	
Satellite Awards	February 15, 2021	Best Animated or Mixed Media Film	Soul	Nominated	
Satellite Awards	February 15, 2021	Best Original Screenplay	Pete Docter, Mike Jones, and Kemp Powers	Nominated	
St. Louis Gateway Film Critics Association Awards	January 17, 2021	Best Animated Feature	Soul	Won	
St. Louis Gateway Film Critics Association Awards	January 17, 2021	Best Music Score	Trent Reznor, Atticus Ross, and Jon Batiste	Won	
Toronto Film Critics Association Awards	February 7, 2021	Best Animated Film	Soul	Runner-up (Note: Shared with The Willoughbys (2020))	
Visual Effects Society Awards	April 6, 2021	Outstanding Visual Effects in an Animated Feature	Pete Docter, Dana Murray, Michael Fong, and Bill Watral	Won	
Visual Effects Society Awards	April 6, 2021	Outstanding Animated Character in an Animated Feature	Jonathan Hoffman, Jonathan Page, Peter Tieryas, and Ron Zorman for "Terry"	Won	
Visual Effects Society Awards	April 6, 2021	Outstanding Created Environment in an Animated Feature	Hosuk Chang, Sungyeon Joh, Peter Roe, and Frank Tai for "You Seminar"	Won	
Visual Effects Society Awards	April 6, 2021	Outstanding Virtual Cinematography in a CG Project	Matt Aspbury and Ian Megibben	Won	
Visual Effects Society Awards	April 6, 2021	Outstanding Effects Simulations in an Animated Feature	Alexis Angelidis, Keith Daniel Klohn, Aimei Kutt, and Melissa Tseng	Won	
Washington D.C. Area Film Critics Association Awards	February 8, 2021	Best Animated Feature	Soul	Won	
Washington D.C. Area Film Critics Association Awards	February 8, 2021	Best Score	Trent Reznor, Atticus Ross, and Jon Batiste	Won	
Washington D.C. Area Film Critics Association Awards	February 8, 2021	Best Voice Performance	Jamie Foxx	Won	
Washington D.C. Area Film Critics Association Awards	February 8, 2021	Best Voice Performance	Tina Fey	Nominated	
