= Soul (soundtrack) =

Soul: Original Motion Picture Soundtrack

Soundtrack album by various artists
- Released: December 18, 2020
- Genres: Jazz (Music from and Inspired by Soul); new-age; space (Soul: Original Motion Picture Score)
- Length: 60:04
- Label: Walt Disney
- Producers: Cody Chesnutt; Daveed Diggs; Jonathan Snipes; Jon Batiste; Tom MacDougall; William Hutson

Trent Reznor and Atticus Ross chronology
| Mank (2020) | Soul (2020) | Bones and All (2022) |

Jon Batiste chronology
| Music from and Inspired by Soul (2020) |

Soul: Original Motion Picture Soundtrack is the soundtrack to the 2020 Disney-Pixar film Soul. The soundtrack is a compilation of all 23 score pieces by Trent Reznor and Atticus Ross from the Soul: Original Motion Picture Score vinyl album as well as 16 original songs by Jon Batiste from the Music from and Inspired by Soul vinyl album. All three albums were released through Walt Disney Records on December 18, 2020.

Reznor and Ross composed a new-age score for the metaphysical segments of the film, while Batiste composed a number of original jazz songs for the New York City-based segments of the film. The Japanese version used a jazz rendition of JUJU's "Kiseki Wo Nozomu Nara" for the ending theme.

The soundtrack received critical acclaim as an integral part of the film and won both the Golden Globe and the Oscar for Best Original Score.

== Writing and recording ==
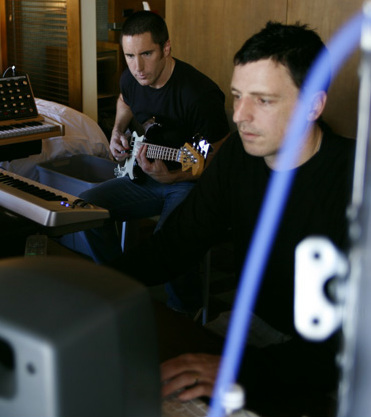
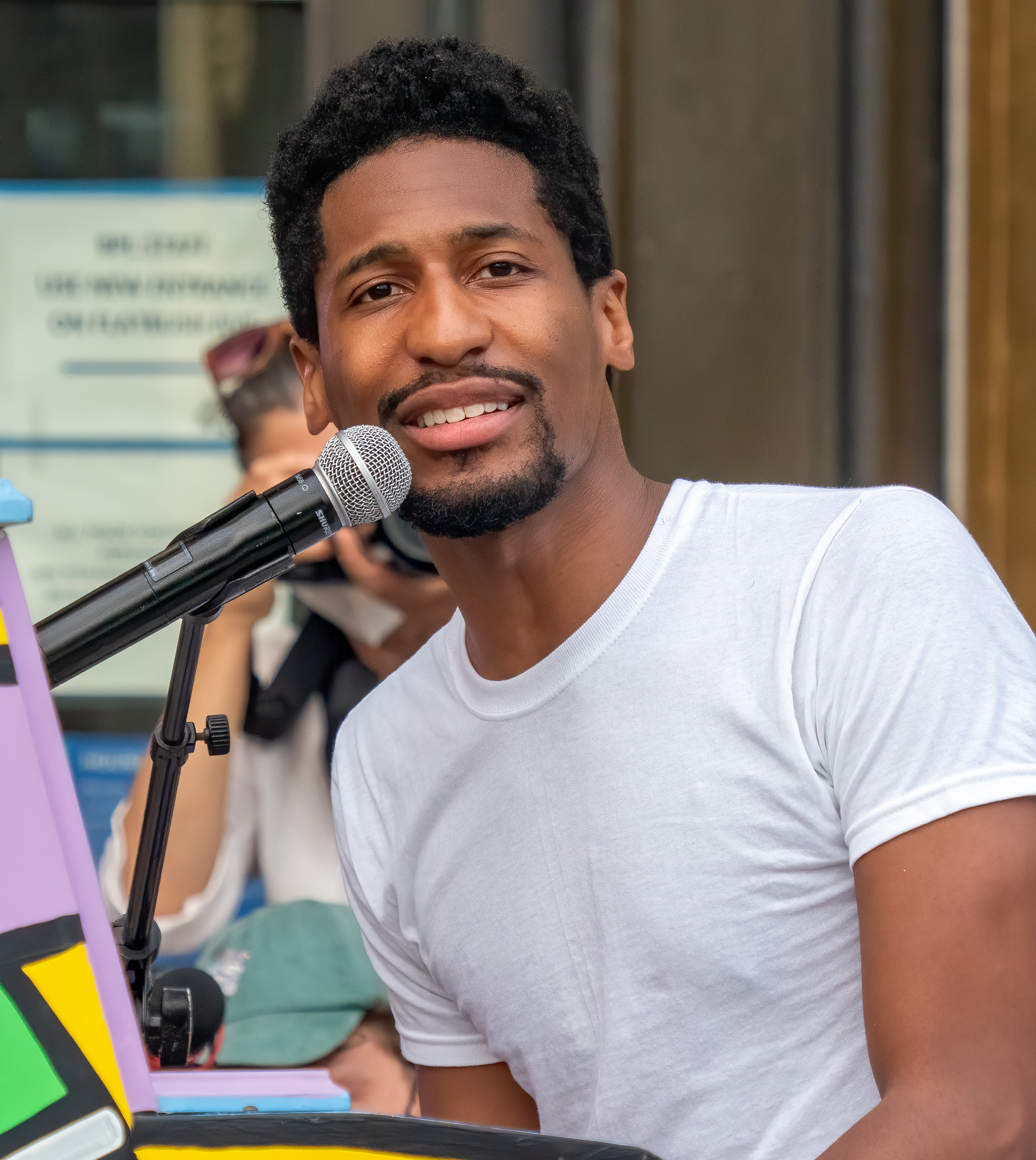
Trent Reznor and Atticus Ross (left) handled the score, while Jon Batiste (right) composed a number of original jazz songs.

During the 2019 D23 Expo, Trent Reznor and Atticus Ross were revealed to be composing the film's score, while Jon Batiste was set to be writing jazz songs for the film. Reznor and Ross had been brought in on the recommendation of sound designer Ren Klyce, who had worked extensively with the duo on David Fincher films. Batiste composed jazz music for the film's New York City sequences while Reznor and Ross wrote an instrumental score for the scenes taking place in the Great Before. Batiste said that he wanted to create jazz music that felt "authentic", but also "accessible to all ages". He also wanted the themes to tie into the "ethereal nature" of the Great Before while still being on Earth. Batiste also sometimes worked with Reznor and Ross to "blend the two worlds, musically". Cody Chesnutt also wrote, produced, and performed an original folk-soul ballad for the film, titled "Parting Ways". It also features a hip hop interlude performed by Daveed Diggs titled "Rappin Ced". Other musicians who were consulted during the creative process include Herbie Hancock, Terri Lyne Carrington and Questlove, the latter of whom also does voice work in the film. Batiste drew inspiration from and wanted to pay homage to jazz legends such as Roy Haynes, Harvey Mason, Branford Marsalis, Kenny Kirkland, Charlie Parker and The Headhunters. Batiste also arranged a new version of the song "It's All Right", originally performed by The Impressions, for the film. This solo version debuted during a performance by Nelly on the 29th season of American competition TV series Dancing with the Stars and is featured in the end credits of the film while a duet version with American-born British soul singer Celeste is not included in the soundtrack. In January 2021, Trent Reznor revealed to Consequence of Sound that he and Atticus Ross had composed six films' worth of music for Soul and also further explained his creative process, stating:

As we started early on, it's like, "I can't wait to see this character"… that doesn't exist because he's not even in the film anymore. Or this expansive moment where you're watching a beautiful scene for a minute and a half, which is now three seconds, because a joke popped up, and now it's a different thing. So, I think we started a lot earlier last time than we would in the future. But it was fascinating to see the process. And I remember as we were getting into it, they could say, "Let's see. Trust the process. We've come up with a way to do this." And I don't mean a factory assembly line, but a strategy of openness and collaboration between not just two or three or four or five people but possibly lots of people.

== Release and promotion ==
Soul: Original Motion Picture Soundtrack was released digitally on December 18, 2020, a week before that of the film. The two vinyl albums, namely Soul: Original Motion Picture Score by Trent Reznor and Atticus Ross and Music from and Inspired by Soul by Jon Batiste, were also made available for purchase on December 18, 2020. Despite not featuring on any of the three albums, the duet version of "It's All Right" with Celeste that features during the end credits was also released digitally as a standalone single on December 18.

== Reception ==
Professional ratings
Review scores
| Source | Rating |
|---|---|
| Exclaim! | 7/10 |

=== Critical response ===
The soundtrack received a highly positive response from both music critics and film critics alike. Many film reviews praised the score as a major highlight of the film. Leslie Felperin of The Hollywood Reporter wrote, "Featuring possibly the best soundtrack in a Pixar film since the first Toy Story, Soul sports a jazz score that is not just an adornment to the story or an emotional enhancement, but an utterly integral part of the narrative." Reznor and Ross's compositions during the metaphysical segments of the film was described musically as new-age and space age, while Batiste's work was described musically as jazz. In a film review for The A.V. Club, A.A. Dowd described the score as "uncharacteristically soothing", while Matt Goldberg of Collider described it as "spellbinding", and A .O. Scott of The New York Times described it as "cerebral".

=== Accolades ===
| Award | Date of ceremony | Category | Recipient(s) | Result | Ref. |
|---|---|---|---|---|---|
| Los Angeles Film Critics Association Awards | December 20, 2020 | Best Music | Trent Reznor and Atticus Ross | Won | |
| Chicago Film Critics Association Awards | December 21, 2020 | Best Original Score | Trent Reznor, Atticus Ross and Jon Batiste | Won | |
| Florida Film Critics Circle Awards | December 22, 2020 | Best Score | Trent Reznor, Atticus Ross and Jon Batiste | Won | |
| Greater Western New York Film Critics Association Awards | December 31, 2020 | Best Score | Trent Reznor and Atticus Ross | Won | |
| Chicago Indie Critics Awards | January 2, 2021 | Best Musical Score | Trent Reznor and Atticus Ross | Won | |
| North Carolina Film Critics Association Awards | January 4, 2021 | Best Music | Soul | Won | |
| Oklahoma Film Critics Circle Awards | January 6, 2021 | Best Score | Trent Reznor and Atticus Ross | Won | |
| Oklahoma Film Critics Circle Awards | January 6, 2021 | Best Body of Work | Trent Reznor and Atticus Ross (Note: Credited to their scoring work on both Soul and Mank (2020).) | Won | |
| St. Louis Gateway Film Critics Association Awards | January 17, 2021 | Best Music Score | Soul | Won | |
| Denver Film Critics Society Awards | January 18, 2021 | Best Original Score | Trent Reznor and Atticus Ross | Won | |
| Houston Film Critics Society Awards | January 18, 2021 | Best Original Score | Trent Reznor, Atticus Ross and Jon Batiste | Won | |
| San Francisco Bay Area Film Critics Circle Awards | January 18, 2021 | Best Original Score | Trent Reznor and Atticus Ross | Won | |
| Online Film Critics Society Awards | January 25, 2021 | Best Original Score | Trent Reznor and Atticus Ross | Won | |
| Hollywood Music in Media Awards | January 27, 2021 | Best Original Score – Animated Film | Trent Reznor, Atticus Ross and Jon Batiste | Won | |
| Hollywood Music in Media Awards | January 27, 2021 | Outstanding Music Supervision – Film | Tom MacDougall | Nominated | |
| Hollywood Music in Media Awards | January 27, 2021 | Best Soundtrack Album | Soul: Original Motion Picture Soundtrack | Nominated | |
| Washington D.C. Area Film Critics Association Awards | February 8, 2021 | Best Score | Trent Reznor, Atticus Ross and Jon Batiste | Won | |
| International Film Music Critics Association Awards | February 18, 2021 | Best Original Score for an Animated Film | Trent Reznor, Atticus Ross and Jon Batiste | Nominated | |
| Golden Globe Awards | February 28, 2021 | Best Original Score | Trent Reznor, Atticus Ross and Jon Batiste | Won | |
| Hollywood Critics Association Awards | March 5, 2021 | Artisans Achievement Award | Trent Reznor and Atticus Ross^{[a]} | Won | |
| Critics' Choice Movie Awards | March 7, 2021 | Best Score | Trent Reznor, Atticus Ross and Jon Batiste | Won | |
| Austin Film Critics Association Awards | March 19, 2021 | Best Score | Trent Reznor, Atticus Ross and Jon Batiste | Won | |
| NAACP Image Awards | March 27, 2021 | Outstanding Soundtrack/Compilation Album | Soul: Original Motion Picture Soundtrack | Won | |
| NAACP Image Awards | March 27, 2021 | Outstanding Jazz Album – Instrumental | Music from and Inspired by Soul | Won | |
| Black Reel Awards | April 11, 2021 | Outstanding Score | Trent Reznor, Atticus Ross and Jon Batiste | Won | |
| British Academy Film Awards | April 11, 2021 | Best Original Music | Trent Reznor, Atticus Ross and Jon Batiste | Won | |
| Annie Awards | April 16, 2021 | Outstanding Achievement for Music in an Animated Feature Production | Trent Reznor, Atticus Ross and Jon Batiste | Won | |
| Academy Awards | April 25, 2021 | Best Original Score | Trent Reznor, Atticus Ross and Jon Batiste | Won | |
| Grammy Awards | April 3, 2022 | Best Improvised Jazz Solo | "Bigger Than Us" | Nominated | |
| Grammy Awards | April 3, 2022 | Best Jazz Instrumental Album | Jazz Selections: Music from and Inspired by Soul | Nominated | |
| Grammy Awards | April 3, 2022 | Best Score Soundtrack for Visual Media | Trent Reznor, Atticus Ross and Jon Batiste | Won (Note: Tied with Carlos Rafael Rivera for The Queen's Gambit.) | |

== Commercial performance ==
A week before the release of the film, the soundtrack album debuted on the UK Soundtrack Albums chart at number 35. After the film was released on December 25, the soundtrack rose to number 12 on this chart and also was credited as two separated entries, one for score and one for soundtrack, on both Billboard's Soundtrack Albums chart and Current Album Sales chart.

== Track listing ==
All songs are written and performed by Trent Reznor and Atticus Ross, except where noted.

Soul: Original Motion Picture Soundtrack track listing
| No. | Title | Writer(s) | Performer(s) | Length |
|---|---|---|---|---|
| 1. | "Born to Play" | Jon Batiste | Jon Batiste | 2:00 |
| 2. | "Born to Play Reprise" | Batiste | Batiste | 0:50 |
| 3. | "Bigger Than Us" | Batiste | Batiste | 1:51 |
| 4. | "Collard Greens and Cornbread Strut" | Batiste | Batiste | 0:36 |
| 5. | "The Great Beyond" | | | 2:45 |
| 6. | "Falling" | | | 0:41 |
| 7. | "The Great Before / U Seminar" | | | 3:19 |
| 8. | "Jump to Earth" | | | 0:52 |
| 9. | "Rappin Ced" | Daveed Diggs | Diggs | 0:37 |
| 10. | "Joe's Lowdown Blues" | Batiste | Batiste | 0:36 |
| 11. | "Terry Time" | | | 1:14 |
| 12. | "Joe's Life" | | | 0:40 |
| 13. | "Portal / The Hall of Everything" | | | 2:18 |
| 14. | "Run / Astral Plane" | | | 1:44 |
| 15. | "Lost Soul" | | | 0:29 |
| 16. | "Meditation / Return to Earth" | | | 1:40 |
| 17. | "22's Getaway" | Batiste | Batiste | 0:58 |
| 18. | "Apex Wedge" | Batiste | Batiste | 0:49 |
| 19. | "Let Your Soul Glow" | Batiste | Batiste | 0:20 |
| 20. | "Terry Time Too" | | | 3:00 |
| 21. | "Feel Soul Good" | Batiste | Batiste | 0:27 |
| 22. | "Parting Ways" | Cody Chesnutt | Chesnutt | 2:20 |
| 23. | "Looking at Life" | Batiste | Batiste | 1:31 |
| 24. | "Fruit of the Vine" | Batiste | Batiste | 0:43 |
| 25. | "22 Is Ready" | | | 1:25 |
| 26. | "Pursuit / Terry's World" | | | 1:42 |
| 27. | "Betrayal" | | | 2:28 |
| 28. | "Space Maker" | Walter Norris | Batiste | 1:17 |
| 29. | "Cristo Redentor" | Duke Pearson | Batiste | 2:21 |
| 30. | "The Epic Conversationalist / Born to Play" | Batiste | Batiste | 1:26 |
| 31. | "Celestial Spaces in Blue" | Batiste | Batiste | 0:52 |
| 32. | "Spiritual Connection" | Batiste | Batiste | 1:13 |
| 33. | "Lost" | | | 1:09 |
| 34. | "Epiphany" | | | 3:48 |
| 35. | "Ship Chase" | | | 1:40 |
| 36. | "Escape / Inside 22" | | | 2:32 |
| 37. | "Flashback" | | | 1:33 |
| 38. | "Earthbound" | | | 1:27 |
| 39. | "Thank You" | | | 0:42 |
| 40. | "Enjoy Every Minute" | | | 0:48 |
| 41. | "It's All Right" | Curtis Mayfield | Batiste | 2:50 |
| 42. | "Just Us" | | | 2:42 |
| Total length: | | | | 64:15 |

Japanese edition bonus tracks
| No. | Title | Writer(s) | Performer(s) | Length |
|---|---|---|---|---|
| 43. | "Kiseki Wo Nozomunara..." (Soul version) | E-3; DJ HIROnyc; Tabatha M | Juju | 3:33 |
| 44. | "Rappin Ced" | Diggs | Subaru Kimura | 0:38 |
| 45. | "Parting Ways" | Chesnutt | Eito | 2:23 |
| Total length: | | | | 70:49 |

Soul: Original Motion Picture Score track listing
| No. | Title | Length |
|---|---|---|
| 1. | "The Great Beyond" | 2:45 |
| 2. | "Falling" | 0:41 |
| 3. | "The Great Before / U Seminar" | 3:19 |
| 4. | "Jump to Earth" | 0:52 |
| 5. | "Terry Time" | 1:14 |
| 6. | "Joe's Life" | 0:40 |
| 7. | "Portal / The Hall of Everything" | 2:18 |
| 8. | "Run / Astral Plane" | 1:44 |
| 9. | "Lost Soul" | 0:29 |
| 10. | "Meditation / Return to Earth" | 1:40 |
| 11. | "Terry Time Too" | 3:00 |
| 12. | "22 Is Ready" | 1:25 |
| 13. | "Pursuit / Terry's World" | 1:42 |
| 14. | "Betrayal" | 2:28 |
| 15. | "Lost" | 1:09 |
| 16. | "Epiphany" | 3:48 |
| 17. | "Ship Chase" | 1:40 |
| 18. | "Escape / Inside 22" | 2:32 |
| 19. | "Flashback" | 1:33 |
| 20. | "Earthbound" | 1:27 |
| 21. | "Thank You" | 0:42 |
| 22. | "Enjoy Every Minute" | 0:48 |
| 23. | "Just Us" | 2:42 |

Jon Batiste – Music from and Inspired by Soul track listing
| No. | Title | Writer(s) | Length |
|---|---|---|---|
| 1. | "Born to Play" | Batiste | 2:00 |
| 2. | "Born to Play Reprise" | Batiste | 0:50 |
| 3. | "Bigger Than Us" | Batiste | 1:51 |
| 4. | "Collard Greens and Cornbread Strut" | Batiste | 0:36 |
| 5. | "Joe's Lowdown Blues" | Batiste | 0:36 |
| 6. | "22's Getaway" | Batiste | 0:58 |
| 7. | "Apex Wedge" | Batiste | 0:49 |
| 8. | "Let Your Soul Glow" | Batiste | 0:20 |
| 9. | "Feel Soul Good" | Batiste | 0:27 |
| 10. | "Looking at Life" | Batiste | 1:31 |
| 11. | "Fruit of the Vine" | Batiste | 0:43 |
| 12. | "The Epic Conversationalist / Born to Play" | Batiste | 1:26 |
| 13. | "Celestial Spaces in Blue" | Batiste | 0:52 |
| 14. | "Spiritual Connection" | Batiste | 1:13 |
| 15. | "The Initial Pursuit" | Batiste | 1:20 |
| 16. | "It's All Right" (featuring Celeste) | Curtis Mayfield | 2:50 |
| 17. | "Space Maker" | Walter Norris | 1:17 |
| 18. | "Cristo Redentor" | Duke Pearson | 2:21 |
| 19. | "Danceland" | Bud Powell | 3:31 |
| 20. | "Epistrophy" | Thelonious Monk | 3:39 |
| 21. | "I Let a Song Go Out of My Heart" | Duke Ellington, Irving Mills, Henry Nemo, John Redmond | 2:52 |
| 22. | "Blue Rondo à la Turk" | Dave Brubeck | 1:03 |

== Charts ==
| Chart (2020) | Peak position |
|---|---|
| UK Soundtrack Albums (Official Charts) | 12 |
| US Current Album Sales (Billboard) Soundtrack version | 69 |
| US Current Album Sales (Billboard) Score version | 47 |
| US Soundtrack Albums (Billboard) Soundtrack version | 24 |
| US Soundtrack Albums (Billboard) Score version | 17 |
