= Chicago Film Critics Association Awards 2020 =

Annual US film awards ceremony

33rd Chicago Film Critics Association Awards
- Date: December 21, 2020
- Site: Chicago, Illinois, U.S.

Highlights
- Best Picture: Nomadland
- Most awards: Nomadland (5)
- Most nominations: Nomadland (7)

The 33rd Chicago Film Critics Association Awards were announced on December 21, 2020. The awards honor the best in film for 2020. The nominations were announced on December 18, 2020. Nomadland received the most nominations (7), followed by Da 5 Bloods (6), First Cow (6) and I'm Thinking of Ending Things (6).

== Winners and nominees ==
The winners and nominees for the 33rd Chicago Film Critics Association Awards are as follows:

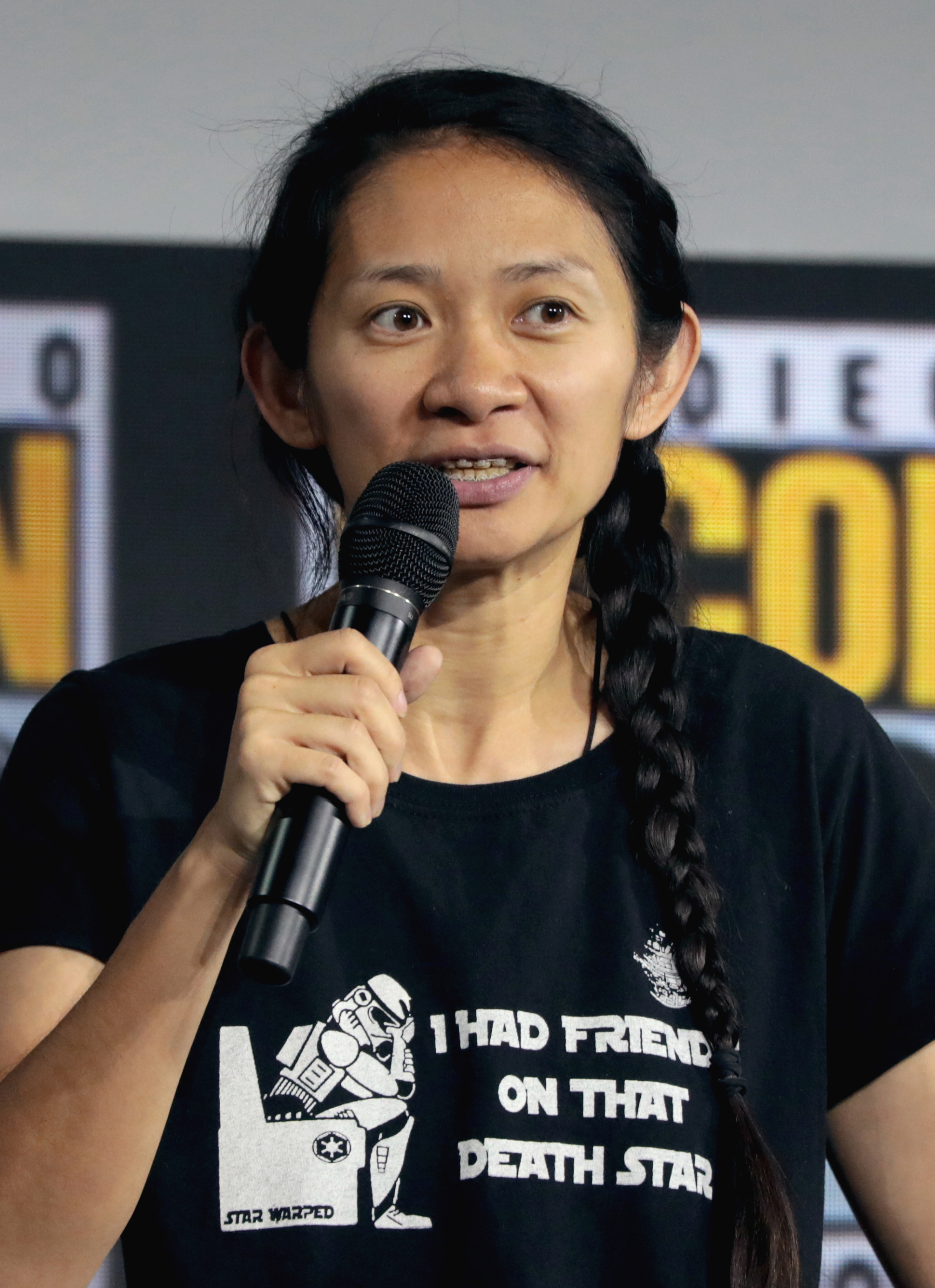
Chloé Zhao, Best Director and Best Adapted Screenplay winner

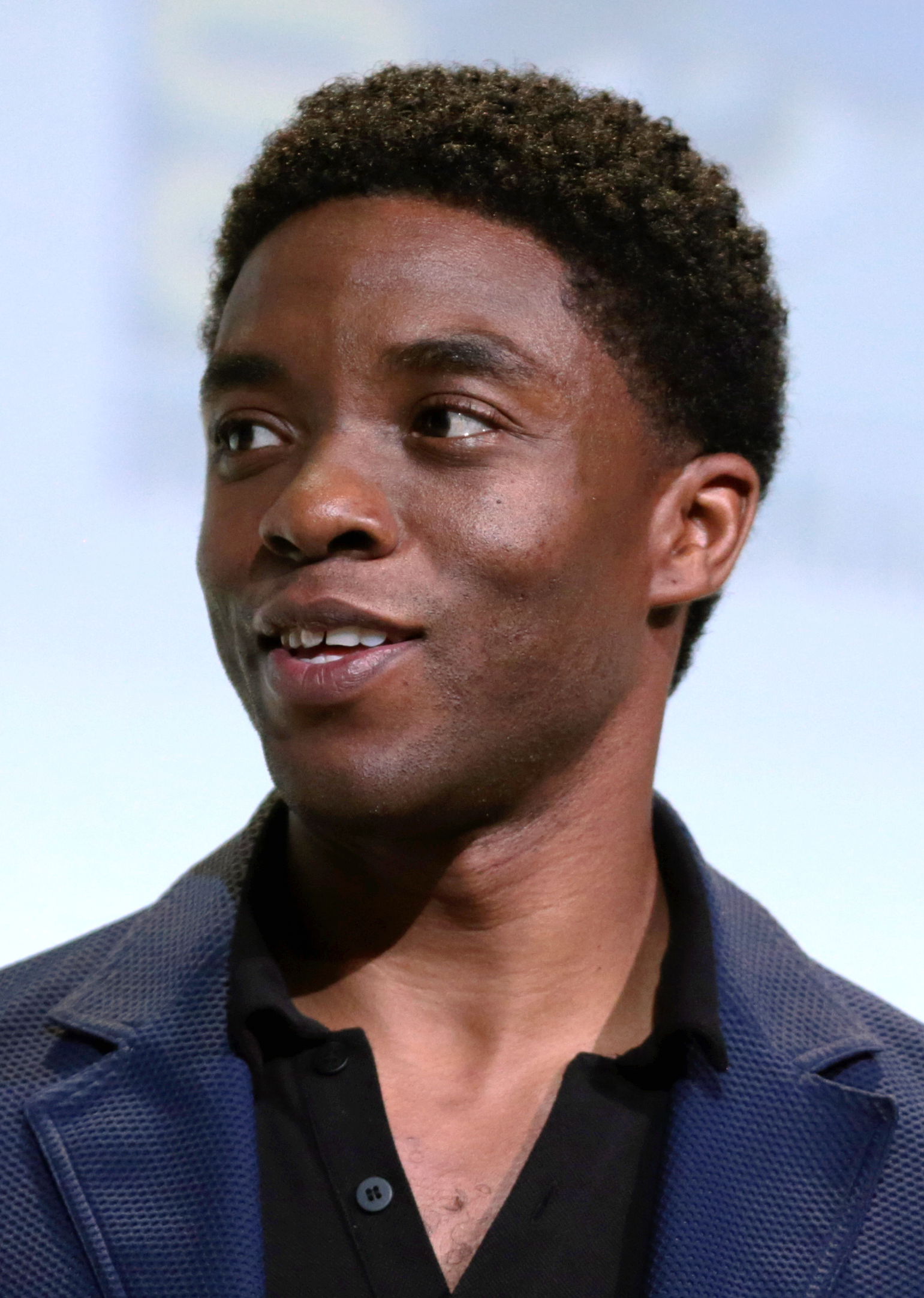
Chadwick Boseman, Best Actor winner

Frances McDormand, Best Actress winner

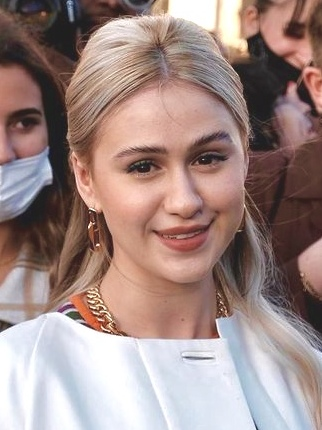
Maria Bakalova, Best Supporting Actress winner

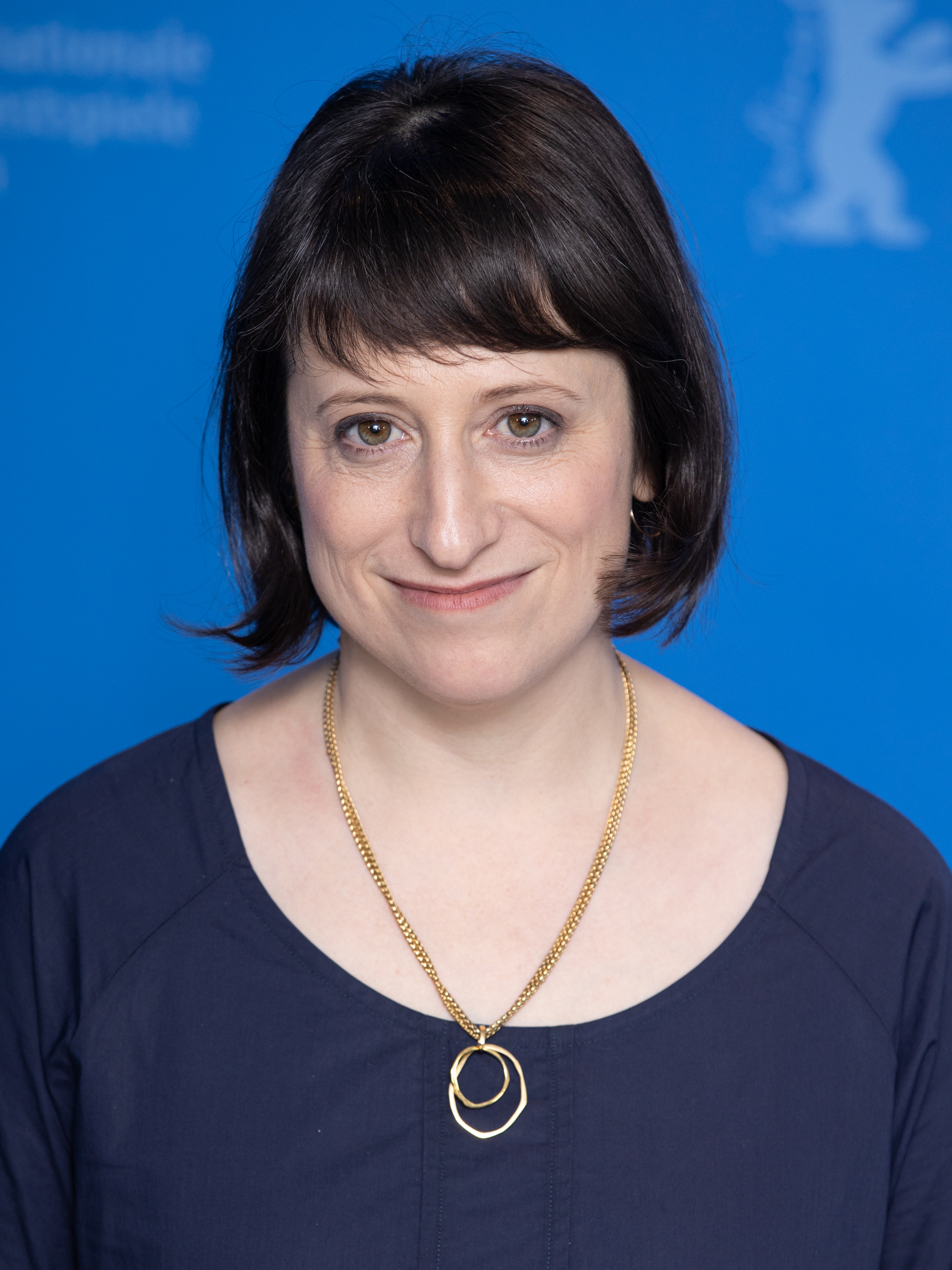
Eliza Hittman, Best Original Screenplay winner

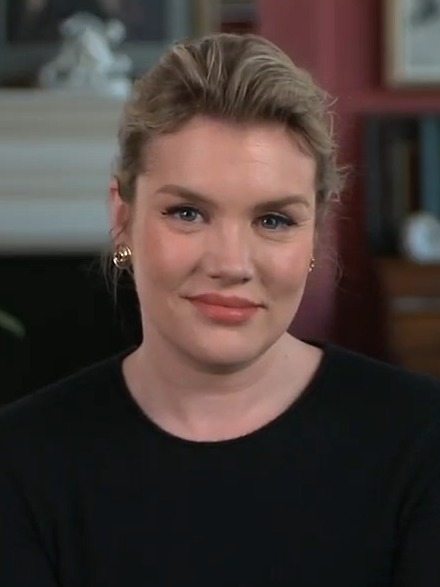
Emerald Fennell, Milos Stehlik Breakthrough Filmmaker Award winner

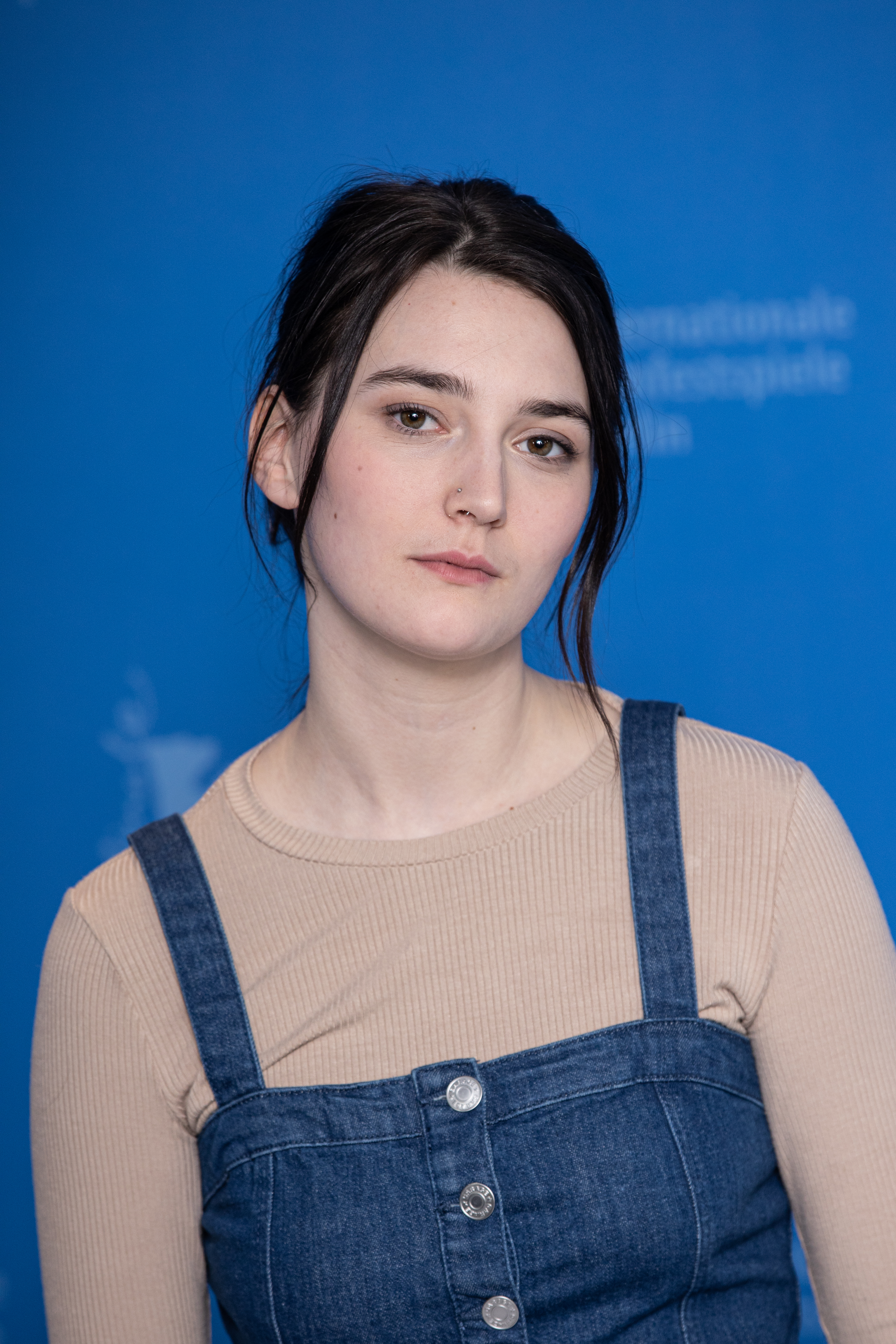
Sidney Flanigan, Most Promising Performer winner

=== Awards ===
Best Film	Best Director
Nomadland; Da 5 Bloods; First Cow; Lovers Rock; Promising Young Woman	Chloé Zhao – Nomadland; Emerald Fennell – Promising Young Woman; Spike Lee – Da 5 Bloods; Steve McQueen – Lovers Rock; Kelly Reichardt – First Cow
Best Actor	Best Actress
Chadwick Boseman – Ma Rainey's Black Bottom as Levee Green (posthumous); Riz Ahmed – Sound of Metal as Ruben Stone; Anthony Hopkins – The Father as Anthony; Delroy Lindo – Da 5 Bloods as Paul; Steven Yeun – Minari as Jacob Yi	Frances McDormand – Nomadland as Fern; Jessie Buckley – I'm Thinking of Ending Things as Young Woman; Carrie Coon – The Nest as Allison O'Hara; Viola Davis – Ma Rainey's Black Bottom as Ma Rainey; Carey Mulligan – Promising Young Woman as Cassandra "Cassie" Thomas
Best Supporting Actor	Best Supporting Actress
Paul Raci – Sound of Metal as Joe; Chadwick Boseman – Da 5 Bloods as "Stormin'" Norman Earl Holloway (posthumous); Bill Murray – On the Rocks as Felix Keane; Leslie Odom Jr. – One Night in Miami... as Sam Cooke; David Strathairn – Nomadland as David	Maria Bakalova – Borat Subsequent Moviefilm as Tutar Sagdiyev; Toni Collette – I'm Thinking of Ending Things as Mother; Amanda Seyfried – Mank as Marion Davies; Letitia Wright – Mangrove as Altheia Jones-LeCointe; Youn Yuh-jung – Minari as Soon-ja
Best Original Screenplay	Best Adapted Screenplay
Never Rarely Sometimes Always – Eliza Hittman; Da 5 Bloods – Danny Bilson, Paul De Meo, Spike Lee, and Kevin Willmott; Promising Young Woman – Emerald Fennell; Soul – Pete Docter, Mike Jones, and Kemp Powers; The Trial of the Chicago 7 – Aaron Sorkin	Nomadland – Chloé Zhao; The Father – Christopher Hampton and Florian Zeller; First Cow – Jonathan Raymond and Kelly Reichardt; I'm Thinking of Ending Things – Charlie Kaufman; One Night in Miami... – Kemp Powers
Best Animated Film	Best Foreign Language Film
Wolfwalkers – Tomm Moore, Ross Stewart, Nora Twomey, and Paul Young; Onward – Kori Rae and Dan Scanlon; A Shaun the Sheep Movie: Farmageddon – Will Becher, Paul Kewley, and Richard Phelan; Soul – Pete Docter and Dana Murray; The Wolf House – Niles Atallah, Joaquín Cociña, Cristobal León, and Catalina Vergara	Another Round (Denmark) in Danish – Directed by Thomas Vinterberg; Bacurau (Brazil) in Portuguese and English – Directed by Juliano Dornelles and Kleber Mendonça Filho; Beanpole (Russia) in Russian – Directed by Kantemir Balagov; Collective (Romania) in Romanian – Directed by Alexander Nanau; La Llorona (Guatemala) in Spanish, Mayan-Ixil, and Mayan-Caqchickel – Directed by Jayro Bustamante; Vitalina Varela (Portugal) in Portuguese and Cape Verdean Creole – Directed by Pedro Costa
Best Documentary Film	Best Original Score
Dick Johnson Is Dead – Katy Chevigny, Kirsten Johnson, and Marilyn Ness; American Utopia – David Byrne and Spike Lee; Collective – Hanka Kastelicová, Bernard Michaux, Alexander Nanau, and Bianca Oana; The Social Dilemma – Jeff Orlowski and Larissa Rhodes; Time – Garrett Bradley, Lauren Domino, and Kellen Quinn	Soul – Jon Batiste, Trent Reznor, and Atticus Ross; Da 5 Bloods – Terence Blanchard; Ma Rainey's Black Bottom – Branford Marsalis; Mank – Trent Reznor and Atticus Ross; Tenet – Ludwig Göransson
Best Art Direction	Best Costume Design
Mank – Production Design: Donald Graham Burt; Set Decoration: Jan Pascale; Birds of Prey – Production Design: K. K. Barrett; Set Decoration: Florencia Martin; Emma – Production Design: Kave Quinn; Set Decoration: Stella Fox; First Cow – Production Design: Anthony Gasparro; Set Decoration: Vanessa Knoll; I'm Thinking of Ending Things – Production Design: Molly Hughes; Set Decoration: Mattie Siegal	Emma – Alexandra Byrne; Birds of Prey – Erin Benach; First Cow – April Napier; Ma Rainey's Black Bottom – Ann Roth; Mank – Trish Summerville
Best Editing	Best Cinematography
I'm Thinking of Ending Things – Robert Frazen; Lovers Rock – Chris Dickens and Steve McQueen; Nomadland – Chloé Zhao; Tenet – Jennifer Lame; The Trial of the Chicago 7 – Alan Baumgarten	Nomadland – Joshua James Richards; First Cow – Christopher Blauvelt; Lovers Rock – Shabier Kirchner; Mank – Erik Messerschmidt; The Vast of Night – Miguel Ioann Littin Menz
Best Use of Visual Effects	Milos Stehlik Breakthrough Filmmaker Award
The Invisible Man; I'm Thinking of Ending Things; The Midnight Sky; Possessor; Tenet	Emerald Fennell – Promising Young Woman; Radha Blank – The Forty-Year-Old Version; Lee Isaac Chung – Minari; Darius Marder – Sound of Metal; Andrew Patterson – The Vast of Night
Most Promising Performer	
Sidney Flanigan – Never Rarely Sometimes Always; Maria Bakalova – Borat Subsequent Moviefilm; Kingsley Ben-Adir – One Night in Miami...; Kelly O'Sullivan – Saint Frances; Helena Zengel – News of the World	

== Awards breakdown ==
The following films received multiple nominations:

Nominations	Film
7	Nomadland
6	Da 5 Bloods
6	First Cow
6	I'm Thinking of Ending Things
5	Mank
5	Promising Young Woman
4	Lovers Rock
4	Ma Rainey's Black Bottom
3	Minari
3	One Night in Miami...
3	Soul
3	Sound of Metal
3	Tenet
2	Birds of Prey
2	Borat Subsequent Moviefilm
2	Collective
2	Emma
2	The Father
2	Never Rarely Sometimes Always
2	The Trial of the Chicago 7
2	The Vast of Night

The following films received multiple wins:

Wins	Film
5	Nomadland
2	Never Rarely Sometimes Always
