= 21st Annual Black Reel Awards =

Film-industry awards in 2021

21st Black Reel Awards
- Date: April 11, 2021
- Most wins: One Night in Miami... (5)
- Most nominations: One Night in Miami... (15)

The 21st Annual Black Reel Awards ceremony, presented by the Foundation for the Augmentation of African-Americans in Film (FAAAF) and honoring the best films of 2020, took place on April 11, 2021. During the ceremony, FAAAF presented the Black Reel Awards in 23 categories. The film nominations were announced on February 18, 2021, and led by One Night in Miami... with 15 nominations.

Amazon Studios' 'One Night in Miami...' was the big winner, winning 5 wins including Outstanding Director for Regina King, Outstanding Ensemble and Outstanding Original Song for "Speak Now". King became the third woman behind Gina Prince-Bythewood & Ava DuVernay to win Outstanding Director. Judas and the Black Messiah took home 3 prizes including Outstanding Film, Outstanding Supporting Actor for Daniel Kaluuya & Outstanding Supporting Actress for Dominique Fishback. The producing team of Ryan Coogler, Shaka King and Charles D. King became the first all-Black producing team to win Outstanding Film in Black Reel Award history. In addition, Kaluuya joined Lupita Nyong'o as only the second person and first male to win the Black Reel Award "Triple-Crown" for Lead, Supporting and Breakthrough categories.

Ma Rainey's Black Bottom 2 wins were historic as Chadwick Boseman win for Outstanding Actor became the first posthumously winner, while Viola Davis win for Outstanding Actress tied her for the most wins in that category with 2. Other big winners included The Forty-Year-Old Version, Jingle Jangle: A Christmas Journey & Soul

The 5th Annual Black Reel Awards for Television was presented on August 11, 2021. The nominations were announced on June 17, 2021.

== Film winners and nominees ==
Outstanding Film	Outstanding Director
Judas and the Black Messiah – Charles D. King, Ryan Coogler, and Shaka King; Da 5 Bloods – Jon Kilik, Spike Lee, Beatriz Levin, and Lloyd Levin; Ma Rainey's Black Bottom – Denzel Washington, Todd Black, and Dany Wolf; One Night in Miami... – Jess Wu Calder, Keith Calder, and Jody Klein; Soul – Dana Murray	Regina King – One Night in Miami...; Radha Blank – The 40-Year-Old Version; Shaka King – Judas and the Black Messiah; Spike Lee – Da 5 Bloods; Channing Godfrey Peoples – Miss Juneteenth
Outstanding Actor	Outstanding Actress
Chadwick Boseman – Ma Rainey's Black Bottom as Levee Green; Kingsley Ben-Adir – One Night in Miami... as Malcolm X; Delroy Lindo – Da 5 Bloods as Paul; Rob Morgan – Bull as Abe; Lakeith Stanfield – Judas and the Black Messiah as William "Bill" O'Neal	Viola Davis – Ma Rainey's Black Bottom as Ma Rainey; Nicole Beharie – Miss Juneteenth as Turquoise Jones; Andra Day – The United States vs. Billie Holiday as Billie Holiday; Tessa Thompson – Sylvie's Love as Sylvie Parker; Zendaya – Malcolm & Marie as Marie Jones
Outstanding Supporting Actor	Outstanding Supporting Actress
Daniel Kaluuya – Judas and the Black Messiah as Fred Hampton; Chadwick Boseman – Da 5 Bloods as "Stormin'" Norman Earl Holloway; Colman Domingo – Ma Rainey's Black Bottom as Cutler; Aldis Hodge – One Night in Miami... as Jim Brown; Leslie Odom Jr. – One Night in Miami... as Sam Cooke	Dominique Fishback – Judas and the Black Messiah as Deborah Johnson; Alexis Chikaeze – Miss Juneteenth as Kai Jones; KiKi Layne – The Old Guard as Nile Freeman; Tracee Ellis Ross – The High Note as Grace Davis; Gabourey Sidibe – Antebellum as Dawn
Outstanding Breakthrough Performance, Male	Outstanding Breakthrough Performance, Female
Kingsley Ben-Adir – One Night in Miami... as Malcolm X; Yahya Abdul-Mateen II – The Trial of the Chicago 7 as Bobby Seale; Dusan Brown – Ma Rainey's Black Bottom as Sylvester; Eli Goree – One Night in Miami... as Cassius Clay; Ntare Guma Mbaho Mwine – Farewell Amor as Walter	Andra Day – The United States vs. Billie Holiday as Billie Holiday; Radha Blank – The 40-Year-Old Version as Radha; Alexis Chikaeze – Miss Juneteenth as Kai Jones; Dominique Fishback – Judas and the Black Messiah as Deborah Johnson; Zendaya – Malcolm & Marie as Marie Jones
Outstanding Ensemble	Outstanding Screenplay, Adapted or Original
One Night in Miami... – Kimberly Hardin; Da 5 Bloods – Kim Coleman; Judas and the Black Messiah – Alexa L. Fogel; Ma Rainey's Black Bottom – Avy Kaufman; Miss Juneteenth – Tisha Blood, Chelsea Ellis Bloch, and Matthew West Taylor	The 40-Year-Old Version – Radha Blank; Judas and the Black Messiah – Will Berson and Shaka King; Ma Rainey's Black Bottom – Ruben Santiago-Hudson; One Night in Miami... – Kemp Powers; Soul – Pete Docter, Mike Jones, and Kemp Powers
Outstanding Documentary Feature	Outstanding Independent Film
Time – Garrett Bradley; All In: The Fight for Democracy – Liz Garbus and Lisa Cortés; John Lewis: Good Trouble – Dawn Porter; MLK/FBI – Sam Pollard; The Way I See It – Dawn Porter	The 40-Year-Old Version – Radha Blank; American Skin – Nate Parker; Farewell Amor – Ekwa Msangi; Miss Juneteenth – Channing Godfrey Peoples; Sylvie's Love – Eugene Ashe
Outstanding Short Film	Outstanding Independent Documentary
Canvas – Frank E. Abney III; Brother – Ya'ke Smith; The Cypher – Letia Solomon; Grab My Hand: A Letter to My Dad – Camrus Johnson; The Pandemic Chronicles – Ya'ke Smith	Mr. Soul! – Melissa Haizlip; The Sit-In: Harry Belafonte Hosts the Tonight Show – Yoruba Richen; With Drawn Arms – Glenn Kaino and Afshin Shahidi
Outstanding Foreign-Language Film	Outstanding Voice Performance
Night of the Kings (Senegal) – Philippe Lacôte; His House (United Kingdom) – Remi Weekes; The Life Ahead (Italy) – Edoardo Ponti	Jamie Foxx – Soul as Joe Gardner; Angela Bassett – Soul as Dorothea Williams; Phylicia Rashad – Soul as Libba Gardner; Maya Rudolph – The Willoughbys as Linda a.k.a. The Nanny; Octavia Spencer – Onward as "Corey" The Manticore
Outstanding Emerging Director	Outstanding First Screenplay
Regina King – One Night in Miami...; Eugene Ashe – Sylvie's Love; Radha Blank – The 40-Year-Old Version; Shaka King – Judas and the Black Messiah; Channing Godfrey Peoples – Miss Juneteenth	Radha Blank – The 40-Year-Old Version; Ruben Santiago-Hudson – Ma Rainey's Black Bottom; Channing Godfrey Peoples – Miss Juneteenth; Kemp Powers – One Night in Miami...; Eugene Ashe – Sylvie's Love
Outstanding Original Song	Outstanding Score
"Speak Now" (One Night in Miami...) – Leslie Odom Jr. and Sam Ashworth, writers; Leslie Odom Jr., performer; "Fight for You" (Judas and the Black Messiah) – Gabriella Wilson, Dernst Emile II, and Tiara Thomas, writers; H.E.R., performer; "Make It Work" (Jingle Jangle: A Christmas Journey) – John Stephens, writer; Anika Noni Rose and Forest Whitaker, performers; "Poverty Porn" (The 40-Year-Old Version) – Radha Blank, writer; RadhaMUSprime, performer; "Tigress & Tweed" (The United States vs. Billie Holiday) – Andra Day and Raphael Saadiq, writers; Andra Day, performer	Soul – Trent Reznor, Atticus Ross, and Jon Batiste; The 40-Year-Old Version – Guy C. Routte; Jingle Jangle: A Christmas Journey – John Debney; The Photograph – Robert Glasper; Sylvie's Love – Fabrice Lecomte
Outstanding Cinematography	Outstanding Costume Design
Malcolm & Marie – Marcell Rev; Da 5 Bloods – Newton Thomas Sigel; Judas and the Black Messiah – Sean Bobbitt; One Night in Miami... – Tami Reiker; Tenet – Hoyte van Hoytema	Jingle Jangle: A Christmas Journey – Michael Wilkinson; Ma Rainey's Black Bottom – Ann Roth; One Night in Miami... – Francine Jamison-Tanchuck; Sylvie's Love – Phoenix Mellow; The United States vs. Billie Holiday – Paolo Nieddu
Outstanding Production Design
Jingle Jangle: A Christmas Journey – Gavin Bocquet; Judas and the Black Messiah – Sam Lisenco; Ma Rainey's Black Bottom – Mark Ricker; One Night in Miami... – Barry Robison; Tenet – Nathan Crowley

== Films with multiple nominations and awards ==
Film	Wins	Nominations
Da 5 Bloods	0	6
Farewell Amor	0	2
The 40-Year-Old Version	3	8
Jingle Jangle: A Christmas Journey	2	4
Judas and the Black Messiah	3	12
Ma Rainey's Black Bottom	2	10
Malcolm & Marie	1	3
Miss Juneteenth	0	8
One Night in Miami...	5	15
Soul	2	6
Sylvie's Love	0	6
Tenet	0	2
The United States vs. Billie Holiday	1	4

== Television winners and nominees ==
=== Comedy ===
Outstanding Comedy Series
A Black Lady Sketch Show – Robin Thede, showrunner (HBO); black-ish – Courtney Lily, showrunner (ABC); That Damn Michael Che – Michael Che, showrunner (HBO Max); grown-ish – Julie Bean, showrunner (Freeform); Run the World – Yvette Lee Bowser, showrunner (Starz)
Outstanding Actor, Comedy Series	Outstanding Actress, Comedy Series
Anthony Anderson as Andre "Dre" Johnson Sr. on black-ish (ABC); Asante Blackk as Corey on Social Distance (Netflix); Michael Che as various characters on That Damn Michael Che (HBO Max); Trevor Jackson as Aaron Jackson on grown-ish (Freeform); Lamorne Morris as Keef on Woke (Hulu)	Robin Thede as various characters on A Black Lady Sketch Show (HBO); Renee Elise Goldsberry as Wickie on Girls5eva (Peacock); Tracee Ellis Ross as Dr. Rainbow "Bow" Johnson on black-ish (ABC); Yara Shahidi as Zoey Johnson on grown-ish (Freeform); Bresha Webb as Renee Ross on Run the World (Starz)
Outstanding Supporting Actor, Comedy Series	Outstanding Supporting Actress, Comedy Series
Kenan Thompson as various characters on Saturday Night Live (NBC); Deon Cole as Charlie Telphy on black-ish (ABC); David Alan Grier as Pops Dixon on Dad Stop Embarrassing Me! (Netflix); Laurence Fishburne as Earl "Pops" Johnson on black-ish (ABC); Justice Smith as Chester on Genera+ion (HBO Max)	Gabrielle Dennis as various characters on A Black Lady Sketch Show (HBO); Naomi Ackie as Alicia on Master of None (Netflix); Ashley Nicole Black as various characters on A Black Lady Sketch Show (HBO); Jenifer Lewis as Ruby Johnson on black-ish (ABC); Wanda Sykes as Lucretia Turner on The Upshaws (Netflix)
Outstanding Guest Actor, Comedy Series	Outstanding Guest Actress, Comedy Series
Dave Chappelle as Host on Saturday Night Live (NBC); Samuel L. Jackson as Himself on Staged (BBC One); Daniel Kaluuya as Host on Saturday Night Live (NBC); Regé-Jean Page as Host on Saturday Night Live (NBC); Marcus Scribner as Andre "Junior" Johnson on grown-ish (Freeform)	Erika Alexander as Barb on Run the World (Starz); Regina King as Host on Saturday Night Live (NBC); Debbi Morgan as Debbi on Bigger (BET+); Maya Rudolph as Host on Saturday Night Live (NBC); Vanessa Williams as Nance Trace on Girls5eva (Peacock)
Outstanding Directing, Comedy Series	Outstanding Writing, Comedy Series
Woke ("Black People for Rent") – Directed by Maurice Marable (Hulu); A Black Lady Sketch Show ("But the Tilapias Are Fine Though, Right?") – Directed by Lacey Duke and Brittany Scott Smith (HBO); black-ish ("My Dinner With Andre Junior") – Directed by Princess Monique (ABC); black-ish ("Our Wedding Dre") – Directed by Eric Dean Seaton (ABC); Girls5eva ("Separ8 Ways") – Directed by Chioke Nassor (Peacock)	Woke ("Black People for Rent") – Written by Rochee Jeffrey (Hulu); A Black Lady Sketch Show ("But the Tilapias Are Fine Though, Right?") – Written by Lauren Ashley Smith, Robin Thede, Ashley Nicole Black, Akilah Green, Shenovia Large, Rae Sanni, Kristin Layne Tucker, Holly Walker, Kindsey Young and Charla Lauriston (HBO); Girls5eva ("Carma") – Written by Anna Drezen and Azie Dungey (Peacock); black-ish ("Missions & Ambitions") – Written by Isaiah Lester and Melanie Boysaw (ABC); That Damn Michael Che ("Policin") – Written by Michael Che, Gary Richardson, Rosebud Baker, Reggie Conquest, Godfrey Danchimah Jr., Calise Hawkins, Kevin Iso, Sam Jay, Matt Richards, Cipha Sounds and Wil Sylvince (HBO Max)

=== Drama ===
Outstanding Drama Series
Lovecraft Country – Misha Green, showrunner (HBO); The Falcon and the Winter Soldier – Malcolm Spellman, showrunner (Disney+); Lupin – George Kay, showrunner (Netflix); Queen Sugar – Anthony Sparks, showrunner (OWN); Snowfall – Dave Andron, showrunner (FX)
Outstanding Actor, Drama Series	Outstanding Actress, Drama Series
Jonathan Majors as Atticus "Tic" Freeman on Lovecraft Country (HBO); Damson Idris as Franklin Saint on Snowfall (FX); Anthony Mackie as Sam Wilson / Falcon / Captain America on The Falcon and the Winter Soldier (Disney+); Regé-Jean Page as Simon Basset on Bridgerton (Netflix); Billy Porter as Prayerful "Pray" Tell on Pose (FX)	Jurnee Smollett as Letitia "Leti" Lewis on Lovecraft Country (HBO); Brandee Evans as Mercedes Woodbine on P-Valley (Starz); Dawn-Lyen Gardner as Charlotte "Charley" Bordelon West on Queen Sugar (OWN); Queen Latifah as Robyn McCall on The Equalizer (CBS); Simone Missick as Judge Lola Carmichael on all rise. (CBS)
Outstanding Supporting Actor, Drama Series	Outstanding Supporting Actress, Drama Series
Michael K. Williams as Montrose Freeman on Lovecraft Country (HBO); Giancarlo Esposito as Adam Clayton Powell Jr. on Godfather of Harlem (EPIX); Giancarlo Esposito as Moff Gideon on The Mandalorian (Disney+); Niles Fitch as Randall Pearson on This Is Us (NBC); Amin Joseph as Jerome Saint on Snowfall (FX)	Adjoa Andoh as Lady Danbury on Bridgerton (Netflix); Aunjanue Ellis as Hippolyta Freeman on Lovecraft Country (HBO); Michael Hyatt as Cissy Saint on Snowfall (FX); Wunmi Mosaku as Ruby Baptiste on Lovecraft Country (HBO); Susan Kelechi Watson as Beth Pearson on This Is Us (NBC)
Outstanding Guest Actor, Drama Series	Outstanding Guest Actress, Drama Series
Courtney B. Vance as George Freeman on Lovecraft Country (HBO); Giancarlo Esposito as Stan Edgar on The Boys (Amazon Prime Video); Carl Lumbly as Isaiah Bradley on The Falcon and the Winter Soldier (Disney+); Larenz Tate as Councilman Rashad Tate on Power Book II: Ghost (Starz); Carl Weathers as Greef Karga on The Mandalorian (Disney+)	Phylicia Rashad as Carol Clarke on This Is Us (NBC); Gail Bean as Wanda Bell on Snowfall (FX); Rosario Dawson as Ahsoka Tano on The Mandalorian (Disney+); Florence Kasumba as Ayo on The Falcon and the Winter Soldier (Disney+); Sophie Okonedo as Charlotte Wells on Ratched (Netflix)
Outstanding Directing, Drama Series	Outstanding Writing, Drama Series
Lovecraft Country ("Jig-a-Bobo") – Directed by Misha Green (HBO); This Is Us ("Birth Mother") – Directed by Kay Oyegun (NBC); The Mandalorian ("Chapter 15: The Believer") – Directed by Rick Famuyiwa (Disney+); Snowfall ("Sleeping Dogs") – Directed by Carl Seaton (FX); Pose ("The Trunk") – Directed by Tina Mabry (FX)	This Is Us ("Birth Mother") – Written by Kay Oyegun and Eboni Freeman (NBC); The Mandalorian ("Chapter 15: The Believer") – Written by Rick Famuyiwa (Disney+); Lovecraft Country ("Jig-a-Bobo") – Written by Misha Green (HBO); The Falcon and the Winter Soldier ("New World Order") – Written by Malcolm Spellman (Disney+); Snowfall ("Sleeping Dogs") – Written by Justin Hillian (FX)

=== Television Movies/Limited Series ===
Outstanding Television Movie or Limited Series
I May Destroy You – Michaela Coel, showrunner (HBO); Hamilton – Lin-Manuel Miranda, Thomas Kali and Jeffrey Seller, producers (Disney+); Small Axe – Steve McQueen, showrunner (Amazon Prime Video); Sylvie's Love – Jonathan T. Baker, Eugene Ashe and Nnamdi Asomugha, producers (Amazon Prime Video); The Underground Railroad – Barry Jenkins, showrunner (Amazon Prime Video)
Outstanding Actor, TV Movie/Limited Series	Outstanding Actress, TV Movie/Limited Series
Leslie Odom Jr. as Aaron Burr on Hamilton (Disney+); Nnamdi Asomugha as Robert Halloway on Sylvie's Love (Amazon Prime Video); Mamoudou Athie as Nolan Wright on Black Box (Amazon Prime Video); Dule Hill as Burton "Gus" Guston on Psych 2: Lassie Come Home (Peacock); Chris Rock as Loy Cannon on Fargo (FX)	Michaela Coel as Arabella Essiedu on I May Destroy You (HBO); Nicole Beharie as Annie on Monsterland (Hulu); Cynthia Erivo as Aretha Franklin on Genius: Aretha Franklin (National Geographic); Thuso Mbedu as Cora Randall on The Underground Railroad (Amazon Prime Video); Tessa Thompson as Sylvie Parker on Sylvie's Love (Amazon Prime Video)
Outstanding Supporting Actor, TV Movie/Limited Series	Outstanding Supporting Actress, TV Movie/Limited Series
John Boyega as Leroy Logan on Small Axe Red, White & Blue (Amazon Prime Video); Daveed Diggs as Marquis de Lafayette and Thomas Jefferson on Hamilton (Disney+); Paapa Essiedu as Kwame on I May Destroy You (HBO); William Jackson Harper as Royal on The Underground Railroad (Amazon Prime Video); Courtney B. Vance as C.L. Franklin on Genius: Aretha Franklin (National Geographic)	Weruche Opia as Terry Pratchard on I May Destroy You (HBO); Amarah-Jae St. Aubyn as Martha Trenton on Small Axe: "Lovers Rock" (Amazon Prime Video); Renee Elise Goldsberry as Angelica Schuyler on Hamilton (Disney+); Teyonah Parris as Monica Rambeau on WandaVision (Disney+); Letitia Wright as Altheia Jones-LeCointe on Small Axe Mangrove (Amazon Prime Video)
Outstanding Directing, TV Movie/Limited Series	Outstanding Writing, TV Movie/Limited Series
Small Axe ("Lovers Rock") – Directed by Steve McQueen (Amazon Prime Video); I May Destroy You ("Ego Death") – Directed by Michaela Coel and Sam Miller (HBO); Small Axe ("Mangrove") – Directed by Steve McQueen (Amazon Prime Video); Sylvie's Love – Directed by Eugene Ashe (Amazon Prime Video); The Underground Railroad – Directed by Barry Jenkins (Amazon Prime Video)	Sylvie's Love – Written by Eugene Ashe (Amazon Prime Video); The Underground Railroad ("Chapter 1: Georgia") – Directed by Barry Jenkins (Amazon Prime Video); I May Destroy You ("Ego Death") – Written by Michaela Coel (HBO); I May Destroy You ("...It Just Came Up") – Written by Michaela Coel (HBO); Small Axe ("Lovers Rock") – Written by Steve McQueen and Courttia Newland (Amazon Prime Video)

=== Television Movies/Limited Series ===
Outstanding Television Documentary or Special	Outstanding Music
Tina – Daniel Lindsay and T.J. Martin, directors (HBO); Black Is King – Beyonce Knowles-Carter, Kwasi Fordjour, Emmanuel Adjei, Blitz Bazawule, Ibra Ake, Jenn Nkiru, Jake Nava, Pierre Debusschere, Dikayl Rimmasch and Dafe Oboro, directors (Disney+); First Ladies: Michelle Obama – Liz Mermin, director (CNN); The Fresh Prince of Bel-Air Reunion – Marcus Raboy, director (HBO Max); High on the Hog: How African American Cuisine Transformed America – Stephen Satterfield, director (Netflix)	Hamilton – Lin-Manuel Miranda, composer (Disney+); Black Is King – James William Blades, composer (Disney+); Lovecraft Country – Laura Karpman and Raphael Saadiq, composers; Liza Richardson, music supervisor (HBO); Pose – Mac Quayle, composer; Amanda Krieg Thomas, Alexis Martin Woodall and Ryan Murphy, music supervisors (FX); Sylvie's Love – Fabrice Lecomte, composer (Amazon Prime Video)
