= Kemp Powers =

American writer (born 1973)

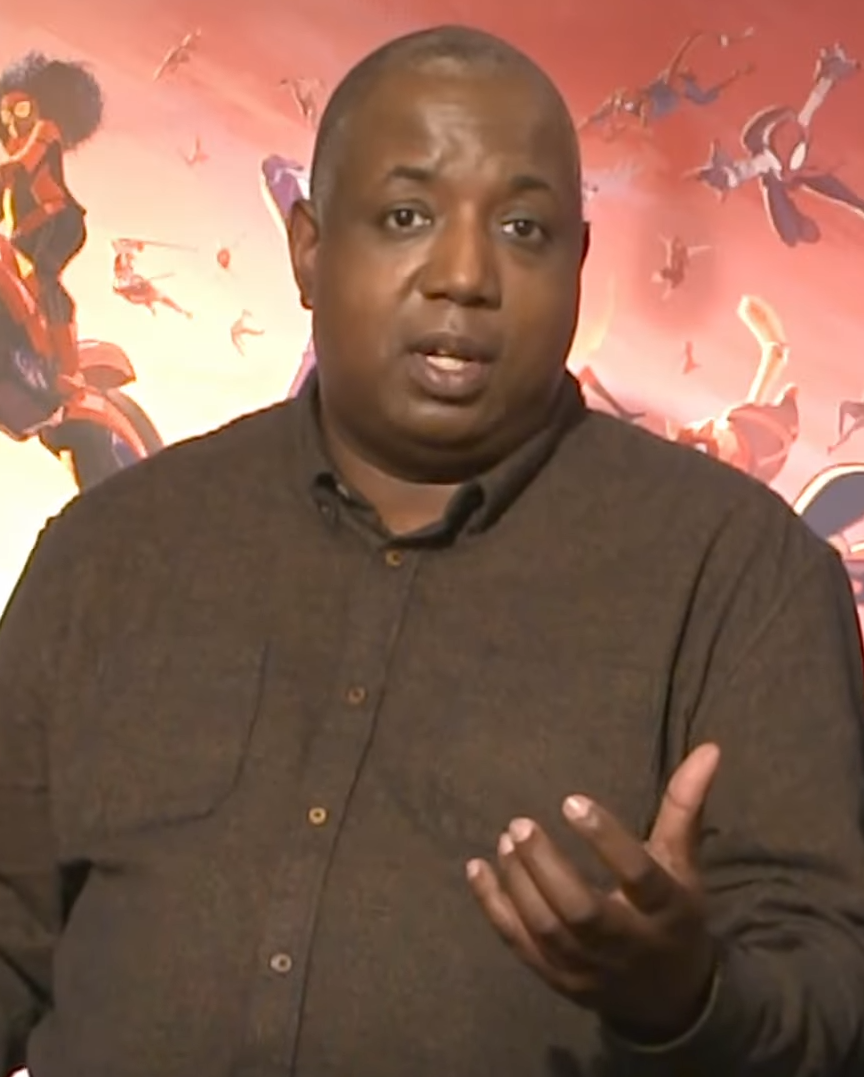
- Powers in 2023
- Born: October 30, 1973 (age 52); Brooklyn, New York City, U.S.
- Education: Howard University
- Occupations: Screenwriter; playwright; director
- Years active: 2012–present
- Notable work: One Night in Miami; One Night in Miami...; Soul; Spider-Man: Across the Spider-Verse

Kemp Powers is an American playwright, screenwriter, and director. He is best known for his play One Night in Miami and the 2020 film adaptation of the same name, as well as for co-directing the animated films Soul (2020) and Spider-Man: Across the Spider-Verse (2023). His screenplay for One Night in Miami... earned him a Best Adapted Screenplay nomination at the 93rd Academy Awards, while his work on Soul made him the first African-American to co-direct a Walt Disney Animation Studios and Pixar feature. Powers was also nominated for the Academy Award for Best Animated Feature at the 96th Academy Awards.

== Career ==
After writing the 2012 short film This Day Today, he scripted the 2013 play One Night in Miami, which was adapted into a feature film directed by Regina King. In 2017, Powers was brought onboard to write several scripts for Star Trek: Discovery season one episodes. In 2018, he drafted his second play Little Black Shadows. In the same year, he co-wrote the script for Pixar's Soul, with Pete Docter and Mike Jones, as well as co-directing the film with Docter, making his directorial debut. An alumnus of Howard University, Powers is the first African-American co-director in Walt Disney Animation Studios and Pixar history. On December 16, 2020, Powers hosted the first three episodes of the podcast Soul Stories, which was released as a Spotify exclusive. In the episodes, Powers interviewed several people who worked on the film mainly about their mentors and careers, as well as some behind-the-scenes stories behind the making of the film.

In 2021, he appeared in the podcast Spark & Fire, prior to writing his third play Christa McAuliffe's Eyes Were Blue. In the same year, he signed on to direct Spider-Man: Across the Spider-Verse and its sequel Spider-Man: Beyond the Spider-Verse with Joaquim Dos Santos and Justin K. Thompson. In March 2023, Powers premiered his fourth play The XIXth (The Nineteenth), which chronicles the lives of two Black American sprinters who raised their fists in protest during the 1968 Summer Olympics games. In Fall 2024, he was the John H. Mitchell Visiting Professor in Media Entertainment at the University of Michigan. In November 2024, he was set to make his live action filmmaking debut when he signed on to write and direct the crime film Lunik Heist for Searchlight Pictures. In December 2024, it was reported that he would not direct Spider-Man: Beyond the Spider-Verse.

== Filmography ==
Year	Title	Director	Writer	Notes
2012	This Day Today	No	Yes	Short film
2017	Star Trek: Discovery	No	Yes	5 episodes
2020	One Night in Miami...	No	Yes	Also executive producer
2020	Soul	Co-director	Yes	Co-writer with Pete Docter and Mike Jones
2023	Spider-Man: Across the Spider-Verse	Yes	No	With Joaquim Dos Santos and Justin K. Thompson

== Plays ==
- One Night in Miami (2013)
- Little Black Shadows (2018)
- Christa McAuliffe's Eyes Were Blue (2021)
- The XIXth (The Nineteenth) (2023)

== Accolades ==
Award	Date of ceremony	Category	Film	Result	Ref.
Academy Awards	April 25, 2021	Best Adapted Screenplay	One Night in Miami...	Nominated	
Academy Awards	March 10, 2024	Best Animated Feature	Spider-Man: Across the Spider-Verse	Nominated	
AAFCA Awards	April 7, 2021	Best Screenplay	One Night in Miami...	Won	
Alliance of Women Film Journalists Awards	January 4, 2021	Best Writing, Adapted Screenplay	One Night in Miami...	Nominated	
Annie Awards	April 16, 2021	Best Direction – Feature	Soul	Nominated	
Annie Awards	April 16, 2021	Best Writing – Feature	Soul	Won	
Annie Awards	February 17, 2024	Best Direction – Feature	Spider-Man: Across the Spider-Verse	Won	
Black Reel Awards	April 11, 2021	Outstanding Breakthrough Screenwriter	One Night in Miami...	Nominated	
Black Reel Awards	April 11, 2021	Outstanding Screenplay, Adapted or Original	One Night in Miami...	Nominated	
Black Reel Awards	April 11, 2021	Outstanding Screenplay, Adapted or Original	Soul	Nominated	
Celebration of Cinema and Television	December 4, 2023	Animation Award	Spider-Man: Across the Spider-Verse	Won	
Chicago Film Critics Association	December 21, 2020	Best Original Screenplay	Soul	Nominated	
Chicago Film Critics Association	December 21, 2020	Best Adapted Screenplay	One Night in Miami...	Nominated	
Critics' Choice Movie Awards	March 7, 2021	Best Adapted Screenplay	One Night in Miami...	Nominated	
Denver Film Critics Society	January 18, 2021	Best Adapted Screenplay	One Night in Miami...	Nominated	
Florida Film Critics Circle	December 21, 2020	Best Original Screenplay	Soul	Nominated	
Golden Globe Awards	February 28, 2021	Best Animated Feature	Soul	Won	
Harvey Awards	October 12, 2023	Best Adaptation from Comic Book/Graphic Novel	Spider-Man: Across the Spider-Verse	Won	
Hawaii Film Critics Society	January 13, 2021	Best Adapted Screenplay	One Night in Miami...	Nominated	
Hollywood Critics Association Midseason Film Awards	June 30, 2023	Best Director	Spider-Man: Across the Spider-Verse	Won	
Houston Film Critics Society Awards	January 18, 2021	Best Screenplay	One Night in Miami...	Nominated	
Hugo Awards	December 18, 2021	Best Dramatic Presentation, Long Form	Soul	Nominated	
Indiana Film Journalists Association	December 21, 2020	Best Adapted Screenplay	One Night in Miami...	Nominated	
Indiana Film Journalists Association	December 21, 2020	Breakout of the Year	One Night in Miami...	Nominated	
NAACP Image Awards	March 27, 2021	Outstanding Writing in a Motion Picture	One Night in Miami...	Nominated	
NAACP Image Awards	March 27, 2021	Outstanding Writing in a Motion Picture	Soul	Nominated	
North Carolina Film Critics Association	January 4, 2021	Best Adapted Screenplay	One Night in Miami...	Nominated	
Online Film Critics Society Awards	January 25, 2021	Best Adapted Screenplay	One Night in Miami...	Nominated	
Satellite Awards	February 15, 2021	Best Original Screenplay	Soul	Nominated	
St. Louis Film Critics Association Awards	January 17, 2021	Best Adapted Screenplay	One Night in Miami...	Nominated	
Writers Guild of America Awards	March 21, 2021	Best Adapted Screenplay	One Night in Miami...	Nominated	
