= Florida Film Critics Circle Awards 2020 =

Annual US film awards ceremony

25th FFCC Awards

December 21, 2020

Best Picture:
First Cow

The 25th Florida Film Critics Circle Awards were held on December 21, 2020.

The nominations were announced on December 17, 2020, led by Nomadland and Minari with six nominations each.

== Winners and nominees ==
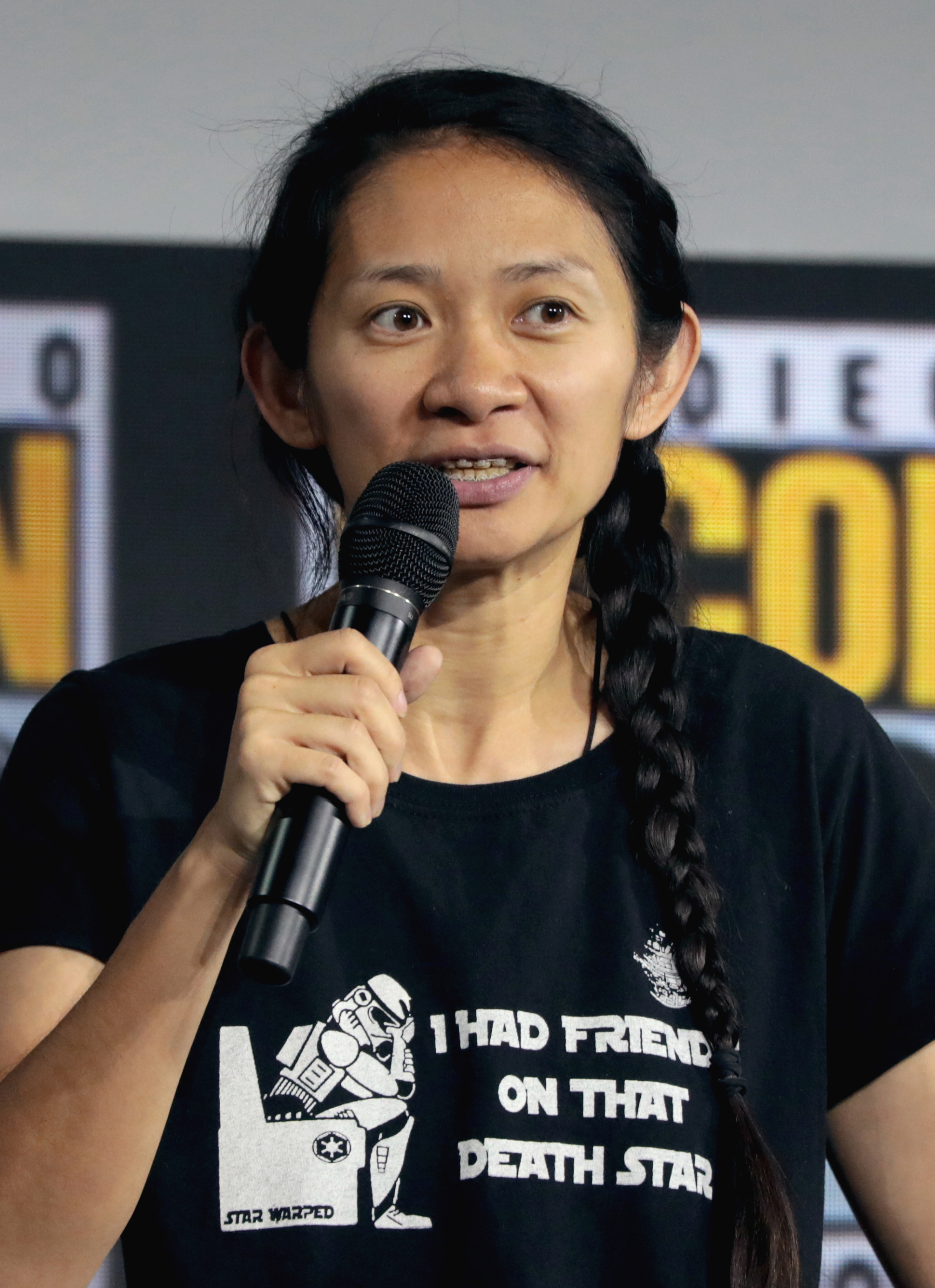
Chloé Zhao, Best Director winner

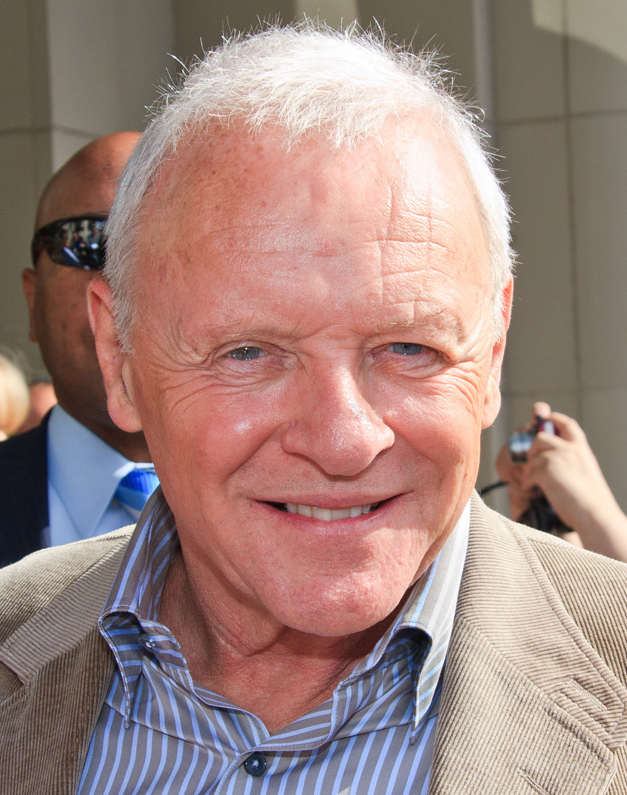
Anthony Hopkins, Best Actor winner

Frances McDormand, Best Actress winner

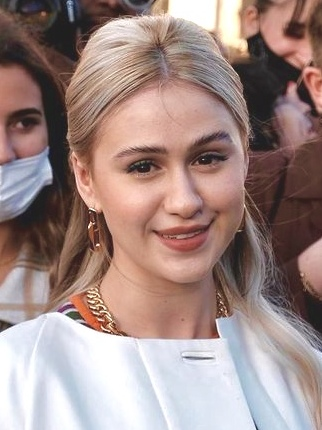
Maria Bakalova, Best Supporting Actress winner

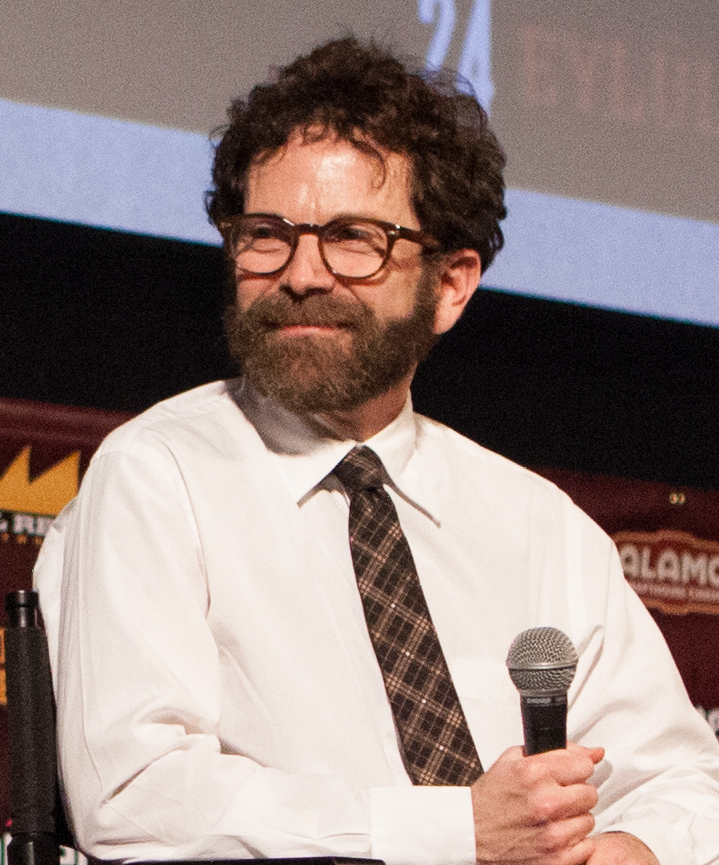
Charlie Kaufman, Best Adapted Screenplay winner

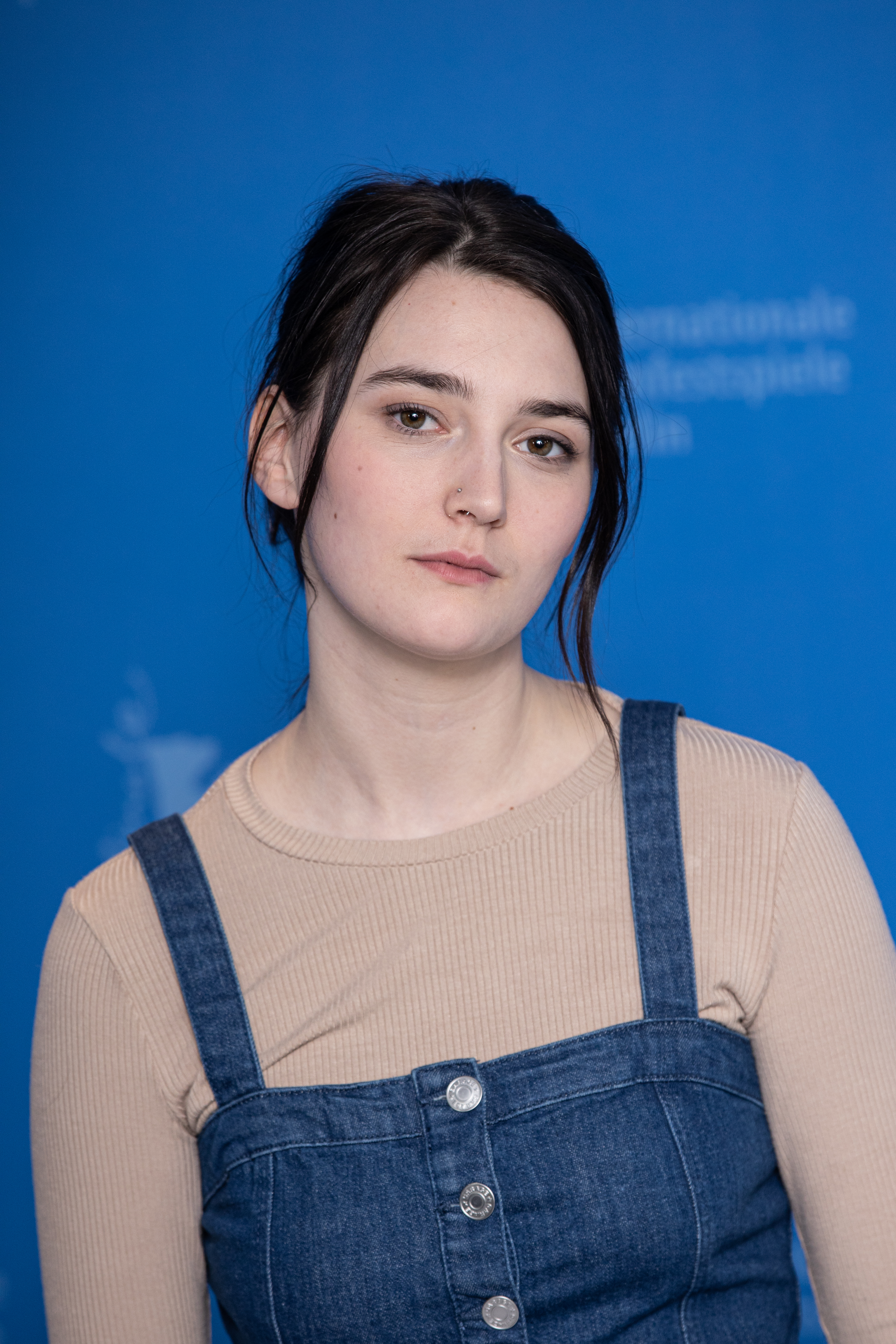
Sidney Flanigan, Breakout Award winner

Winners are listed at the top of each list in bold, while the runner-ups for each category are listed under them.

Best Picture	Best Director
**First Cow**: Runner-up: Minari; Runner-up: Nomadland; Runner-up: The Trial of the Chicago 7	**Chloé Zhao – Nomadland**: Runner-up: Kelly Reichardt – First Cow; Runner-up: Aaron Sorkin – The Trial of the Chicago 7; Lee Isaac Chung – Minari; Florian Zeller – The Father
Best Actor	Best Actress
**Anthony Hopkins – The Father as Anthony**: Runner-up: John Magaro – First Cow as Otis "Cookie" Figowitz; Riz Ahmed – Sound of Metal as Ruben Stone; Chadwick Boseman – Ma Rainey's Black Bottom as Levee Green	**Frances McDormand – Nomadland as Fern**: Runner-up: Viola Davis – Ma Rainey's Black Bottom as Ma Rainey; Runner-up: Carey Mulligan – Promising Young Woman as Cassandra "Cassie" Thomas; Carrie Coon – The Nest as Allison O'Hara; Elisabeth Moss – Shirley as Shirley Jackson
Best Supporting Actor	Best Supporting Actress
**Paul Raci – Sound of Metal as Joe**: Runner-up: Brian Dennehy – Driveways as Del; Sacha Baron Cohen – The Trial of the Chicago 7 as Abbie Hoffman; Chadwick Boseman – Da 5 Bloods as "Stormin'" Norman Earl Holloway; Bill Murray – On the Rocks as Felix Keane	**Maria Bakalova – Borat Subsequent Moviefilm as Tutar Sagdiyev**: Runner-up: Youn Yuh-jung – Minari as Soon-ja; Jane Adams – She Dies Tomorrow as Jane; Charlene Swankie – Nomadland as Swankie
Best Adapted Screenplay	Best Original Screenplay
**Charlie Kaufman – I'm Thinking of Ending Things**: Runner-up: Chloé Zhao – Nomadland; Runner-up: Ruben Santiago-Hudson – Ma Rainey's Black Bottom; Jonathan Raymond and Kelly Reichardt – First Cow; Florian Zeller and Christopher Hampton – The Father	**Lee Isaac Chung – Minari**: Runner-up: Aaron Sorkin – The Trial of the Chicago 7; Pete Docter, Mike Jones, and Kemp Powers – Soul; Emerald Fennell – Promising Young Woman; Jack Fincher – Mank
Best Animated Film	Best Documentary Film
**Soul**: Runner-up: Wolfwalkers; Over the Moon; Ride Your Wave; The Wolf House	**You Don't Nomi**: Runner-up: Dick Johnson Is Dead; David Byrne's American Utopia; Gunda; Time
Best Foreign Language Film	Best Ensemble
**Los Fuertes**: Runner-up: Minari; Dry Wind; The Painted Bird; Those Who Remained	**Mangrove**: Runner-up: The Trial of the Chicago 7; Ma Rainey's Black Bottom; Minari
Best Art Direction / Production Design	Best Cinematography
**Donald Graham Burt and Dan Webster – Mank**: Runner-up: Adam Marshall – Lovers Rock; Kirby Feagan – Shirley	**Erik Messerschmidt – Mank**: Runner-up: Shabier Kirchner – Lovers Rock; Viktor Kossakovsky and Egil Håskjold Larsen – Gunda; Joshua James Richards – Nomadland; Hoyte van Hoytema – Tenet
Best Score	Best Visual Effects
**Jon Batiste, Trent Reznor, and Atticus Ross – Soul**: Runner-up: Ludwig Göransson – Tenet; Alexandre Desplat – The Midnight Sky; William Tyler – First Cow	**Murray Barber – Possessor**: Runner-up: Andrew Jackson – Tenet; Matt Kasmir and Chris Lawrence – The Midnight Sky
Best First Film	Breakout Award
**Promising Young Woman**: Runner-up: The Father; The Forty-Year-Old Version; Relic; Some Kind of Heaven	**Sidney Flanigan – Never Rarely Sometimes Always as Autumn Callahan**: Runner-up: Maria Bakalova – Borat Subsequent Moviefilm as Tutar Sagdiyev; Marin Ireland – The Dark and the Wicked as Louise Straker; Lucas Jaye – Driveways as Cody; Odessa Young – Shirley as Rose Nemser / Paula
The Golden Orange Award	
**Enzian Theater**: Amy Seimetz; Keisha Rae Witherspoon	
