= Chicago Film Critics Association Award for Best Original Screenplay =

One of the annual awards given by the Chicago Film Critics Association

The Chicago Film Critics Association Award for Best Original Screenplay is one of the annual awards given by the Chicago Film Critics Association.

== Winners ==
=== 2000s ===
Year	Winner	Writer(s)
2006	The Queen	Peter Morgan
2006	Babel	Guillermo Arriaga
2006	Letters from Iwo Jima	Iris Yamashita
2006	Little Miss Sunshine	Michael Arndt
2006	United 93	Paul Greengrass
2007	Juno	Diablo Cody
2007	Before the Devil Knows You're Dead	Kelly Masterson
2007	Michael Clayton	Tony Gilroy
2007	Ratatouille	Brad Bird
2007	The Savages	Tamara Jenkins
2008	WALL-E	Andrew Stanton and Jim Reardon
2008	In Bruges	Martin McDonagh
2008	Milk	Dustin Lance Black
2008	Rachel Getting Married	Jenny Lumet
2008	Synecdoche, New York	Charlie Kaufman
2009	The Hurt Locker	Mark Boal
2009	A Serious Man	Joel Coen and Ethan Coen
2009	Away We Go	Dave Eggers and Vendela Vida
2009	Inglourious Basterds	Quentin Tarantino
2009	Up	Bob Peterson

=== 2010s ===
Year	Winner	Writer(s)
2010	Inception	Christopher Nolan
2010	Black Swan	Mark Heyman, Andres Heinz, and John McLaughlin
2010	Four Lions	Jesse Armstrong, Sam Bain, and Chris Morris
2010	The Kids Are All Right	Lisa Cholodenko and Stuart Blumberg
2010	The King's Speech	David Seidler
2011	The Artist	Michel Hazanavicius
2011	Martha Marcy May Marlene	Sean Durkin
2011	Midnight in Paris	Woody Allen
2011	A Separation	Asghar Farhadi
2011	The Tree of Life	Terrence Malick
2012	Zero Dark Thirty	Mark Boal
2012	Django Unchained	Quentin Tarantino
2012	Looper	Rian Johnson
2012	The Master	Paul Thomas Anderson
2012	Moonrise Kingdom	Wes Anderson and Roman Coppola
2013	Her	Spike Jonze
2013	American Hustle	Eric Warren Singer and David O. Russell
2013	Blue Jasmine	Woody Allen
2013	Inside Llewyn Davis	Joel Coen and Ethan Coen
2013	Nebraska	Bob Nelson
2014	The Grand Budapest Hotel	Wes Anderson
2014	Birdman	Alejandro G. Iñárritu, Nicolás Giacobone, Alexander Dinelaris Jr., and Armando Bo
2014	Boyhood	Richard Linklater
2014	Calvary	John Michael McDonagh
2014	Whiplash	Damien Chazelle
2015	Spotlight	Tom McCarthy and Josh Singer
2015	Bridge of Spies	Matt Charman, Joel Coen, and Ethan Coen
2015	Ex Machina	Alex Garland
2015	The Hateful Eight	Quentin Tarantino
2015	Inside Out	Pete Docter, Meg LeFauve, and Josh Cooley
2016	Manchester by the Sea	Kenneth Lonergan
2016	Hell or High Water	Taylor Sheridan
2016	Jackie	Noah Oppenheim
2016	The Lobster	Yorgos Lanthimos and Efthimis Filippou
2016	Moonlight	Barry Jenkins
2017	Get Out	Jordan Peele
2017	The Big Sick	Emily V. Gordon & Kumail Nanjiani
2017	Lady Bird	Greta Gerwig
2017	Phantom Thread	Paul Thomas Anderson
2017	The Shape of Water	Guillermo del Toro and Vanessa Taylor
2017	Three Billboards Outside Ebbing, Missouri	Martin McDonagh
2018	First Reformed	Paul Schrader
2018	Eighth Grade	Bo Burnham
2018	The Favourite	Deborah Davis and Tony McNamara
2018	Roma	Alfonso Cuarón
2018	Vice	Adam McKay
2019	Parasite	Bong Joon-ho and Han Jin-won
2019	The Farewell	Lulu Wang
2019	Knives Out	Rian Johnson
2019	Marriage Story	Noah Baumbach
2019	Once Upon a Time...in Hollywood	Quentin Tarantino

=== 2020s ===
Year	Winner	Writer(s)
2020	Never Rarely Sometimes Always	Eliza Hittman
2020	Da 5 Bloods	Danny Bilson, Paul De Meo, Spike Lee and Kevin Willmott
2020	Promising Young Woman	Emerald Fennell
2020	Soul	Pete Docter, Mike Jones and Kemp Powers
2020	The Trial of the Chicago 7	Aaron Sorkin
2021	Licorice Pizza	Paul Thomas Anderson
2021	The Card Counter	Paul Schrader
2021	The French Dispatch	Wes Anderson
2021	Pig	Michael Sarnoski
2021	Red Rocket	Sean Baker and Chris Bergoch
2022	The Banshees of Inisherin	Martin McDonagh
2022	Aftersun	Charlotte Wells
2022	Everything Everywhere All at Once	Dan Kwan and Daniel Scheinert
2022	The Fabelmans	Tony Kushner and Steven Spielberg
2022	Tár	Todd Field
2023	May December	Samy Burch
2023	Anatomy of a Fall	Arthur Harari and Justine Triet
2023	Barbie	Greta Gerwig and Noah Baumbach
2023	The Holdovers	David Hemingson
2023	Past Lives	Celine Song
2024	A Real Pain	Jesse Eisenberg
2024	Anora	Sean Baker
2024	The Brutalist	Brady Corbet and Mona Fastvold
2024	Challengers	Justin Kuritzkes
2024	The Substance	Coralie Fargeat
