= Dana Murray =

American animator and film producer

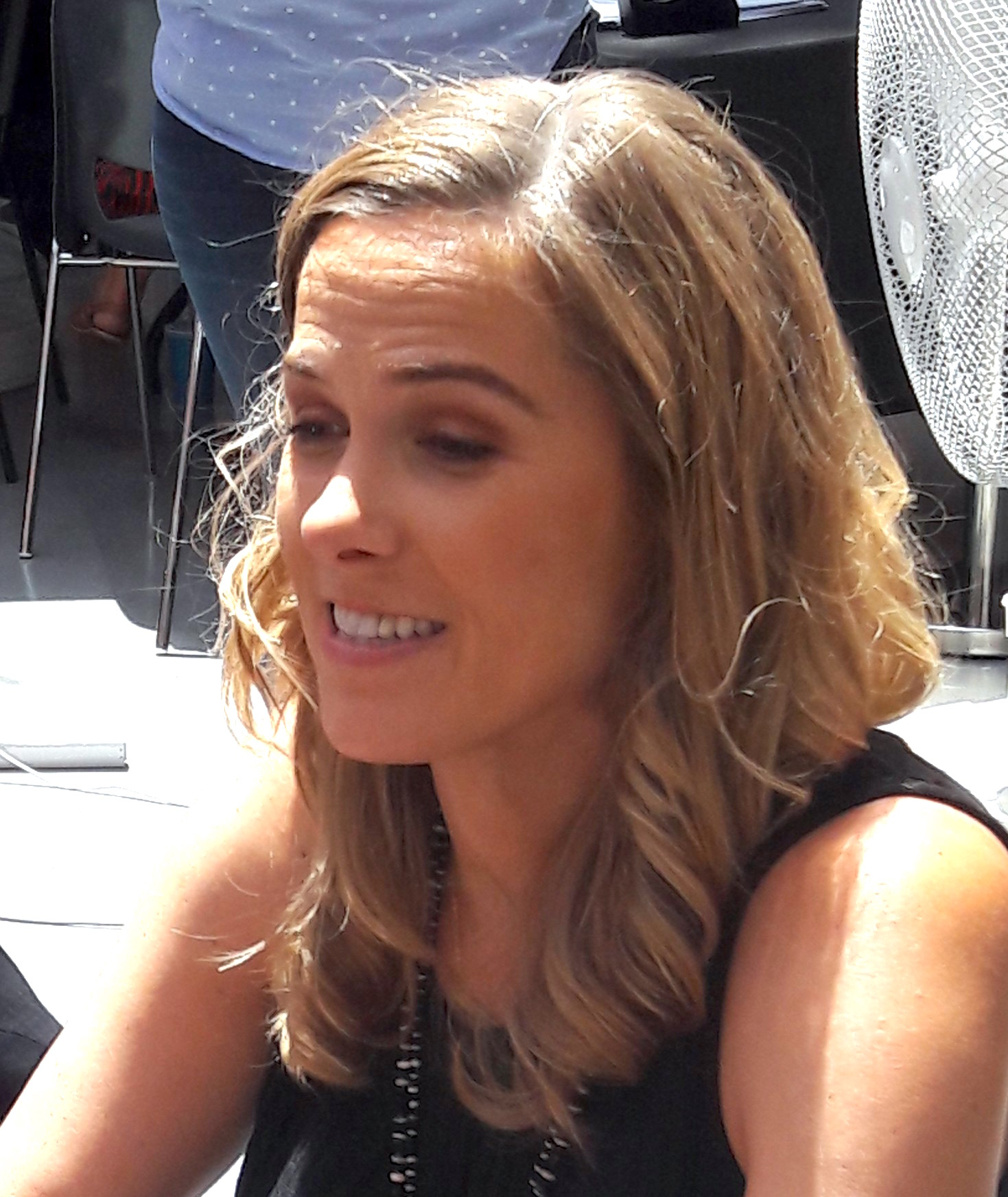
- Murray in 2017
- Occupations: Animator, producer
- Years active: 2003–present
- Awards: Academy Award for Best Animated Feature; Soul (2020)

Dana Leigh Murray is an American animator and film producer, best known for being the producer on the 2020 Pixar film Soul, for which she has won an Academy Award for Best Animated Feature Film at the 93rd Academy Awards, alongside its director Pete Docter.

== Filmography ==
- 2028: Incredibles 3 (producer)
- 2020: Soul (producer)
- 2019: Smash and Grab (Short) (executive producer)
- 2017: Lou (Short) (producer)
- 2015: Inside Out (production manager)
- 2012: Brave (art manager)
- 2010: Kilo (Short) (production manager)
- 2009: Up (layout manager)
- 2007: Ratatouille (lighting manager)
- 2006: Lifted (Short) (production coordinator)
- 2005: One Man Band (Short) (production coordinator)
- 2005: Jack-Jack Attack (Video short) (production coordinator)
- 2003: Making Nemo (Video short documentary) (very special thanks)
- 2003: Finding Nemo (unit coordinator: digital final - as Dana Leigh Murray)

== Awards and nominations ==
- Nominated: Academy Award for Best Animated Short Film (Lou)
- Nominated: San Francisco International Film Festival — Golden Gate Award for Best Family Film (Lou)
- Nominated: South by Southwest — SXSW Grand Jury Award for Animated Short (Lou)
- Won: Golden Globe Award for Best Animated Feature Film (Soul)
- Won: Producers Guild of America Award for Best Animated Motion Picture (Soul)
- Won: Annie Award for Best Animated Feature (Soul)
- Won: Academy Award for Best Animated Feature (Soul)
