= Soul (2020 film) =

2020 film by Pete Docter

- Release poster
- Directed by: Pete Docter
- Written by: Pete Docter; Mike Jones; Kemp Powers
- Produced by: Dana Murray
- Starring: Jamie Foxx; Tina Fey; Graham Norton; Rachel House; Alice Braga; Richard Ayoade; Phylicia Rashad; Donnell Rawlings; Questlove; Angela Bassett
- Cinematography: Matt Aspbury; Ian Megibben
- Edited by: Kevin Nolting
- Music by: Trent Reznor; Atticus Ross; Jon Batiste (Note: Jazz compositions and arrangements)
- Production company: Pixar Animation Studios
- Distributed by: Walt Disney Studios; Motion Pictures (Note: Distributed under the Walt Disney Pictures banner.)
- Release dates: October 11, 2020 (BFI); December 25, 2020 (Disney+)
- Running time: 100 minutes
- Country: United States
- Language: English
- Budget: $150 million
- Box office: $122 million

Soul is a 2020 American animated fantasy film directed by Pete Docter, who co-wrote it with Mike Jones and Kemp Powers. Produced by Pixar Animation Studios for Walt Disney Pictures, the film stars the voices of Jamie Foxx, Tina Fey, Graham Norton, Rachel House, Alice Braga, Richard Ayoade, Phylicia Rashad, Donnell Rawlings, Questlove, and Angela Bassett. It follows Joe Gardner (Foxx), a middle school teacher and aspiring pianist who falls into a coma following an accident and seeks to reunite his separated soul and body in time for his big break as a jazz musician.

Docter conceived Soul in January 2016, examining the origins of human personalities and the concept of determinism. During his first meeting with Jones, he pitched the idea about spacetime involving souls with personalities. The film's producers consulted various jazz musicians, including Herbie Hancock and Terri Lyne Carrington, and animated its musical sequences using the sessions of musician Jon Batiste as a reference. Apart from Batiste's original jazz compositions, musicians Trent Reznor and Atticus Ross composed the film's score. Production on Soul lasted for four years on an approximate $150-200 million budget. It is the first Pixar film to feature a black lead.

Soul premiered at the BFI London Film Festival on October 11, 2020, and was scheduled for theatrical release on June 19 and November 20; however, it was postponed due to the COVID-19 pandemic. It was released direct-to-streaming on Disney+ on December 25, 2020, accompanied by the short film Burrow, and in theaters in countries without the streaming service. It was theatrically released in the United States on January 12, 2024. It received critical acclaim for its animation, screenplay, subject matter, emotional depth, score, and mature themes, and grossed $122 million against a budget of $150 million. The National Board of Review and the American Film Institute named Soul one of the top ten films of 2020. It was nominated for three Academy Awards at the 93rd Academy Awards, winning two, and received numerous other accolades.

== Plot ==
In New York City, pianist Joe Gardner teaches music part-time at a middle school while dreaming of playing jazz professionally. When he receives an offer to teach full-time, his mother Libba urges him to accept, although Joe is resistant. Joe learns famous jazz musician Dorothea Williams has an opening in her quartet and auditions at a jazz club. Impressed with his piano playing, Dorothea hires him for that night's show. As Joe heads off, his excitement distracts him, and he dies falling down an open manhole.

Joe finds himself a disembodied soul heading into an afterlife called the "Great Beyond". Unwilling to die, he tries to escape but ends up in the "Great Before" (aka "You Seminar"), a realm where new souls are prepared for life on Earth with guidance from otherworldly counselors — all named Jerry — and experienced souls who act as mentors: each soul has a badge that grants passage to Earth once it has been completely filled in with interests and personality traits. Mistaken for a mentor, Joe is assigned to 22, a cynical soul who has been in the Great Before for thousands of years and hopes to avoid Earth. Intrigued by Joe's desperation to return to an unremarkable life, 22 agrees to let Joe help find her "spark", which will complete her badge and enable Joe to use it to return home. After Joe fails several attempts to find 22 a passion, they visit "the Zone", a place that souls enter when their passions create a euphoric trance, but which becomes a trap for obsessed, lost souls. They meet Moonwind, a sign twirler who regularly enters the Zone to rescue lost souls, and helps the duo locate Joe's soulless body in a hospital.

Joe returns to Earth but accidentally brings 22 with him, and they awaken in Joe's hospital room in the wrong bodies, with 22 inhabiting Joe's body and Joe inhabiting the body of a therapy cat. They locate Moonwind, who agrees to meet at the jazz club that night to restore Joe to his body. In the meantime, 22 settles into Joe's body and starts to find enjoyment in trivial things like food, wind, and music. She holds poignant conversations with Libba, Joe's student Connie, and Joe's barber Dez, deepening her understanding of life. Meanwhile, Terry, the being in charge of counting souls, discovers the count is off and arrives on Earth to find Joe.

As the day ends, Joe and 22 visit Moonwind to return Joe to his body, but 22, having finally discovered the joy of living, refuses to leave Joe's body and flees. As Joe chases her through a subway station, Terry disconnects them from life and returns them to the Great Before. 22 discovers her badge is complete, but Joe bitterly insists it was the result of experiencing life in his body with his preferences and that she has no purpose of her own. Distraught, 22 throws the badge at him and retreats into the Zone. A Jerry informs Joe that a spark is not a soul's purpose in life, but Joe refuses to believe this and discreetly uses 22's badge to return to Earth.

The show at the jazz club is successful, but Joe is confused when it does not bring the fulfillment he was expecting. Looking at small objects that 22 collected while occupying his body, he recalls the moments they had enjoyed together and realizes these experiences gave 22 her spark. Joe plays piano and enters the Zone to return 22's badge but discovers she has become a lost soul, obsessed with the idea that she has no purpose. Joe chases her down and shows her a maple seed she collected to remind her of her time on Earth. They realize that a spark is not a soul's purpose, but simply a desire to live. Joe's actions restore 22 to normal; he returns her badge and accompanies her for as long as he can on her journey down to Earth.

As Joe prepares to enter the Great Beyond, a Jerry stops him and offers him another chance at life in thanks for finally inspiring 22 to live (while another Jerry distracts Terry to manipulate the count). Joe returns to his body on Earth, committed to fully living life.

In a post-credits scene, Terry suddenly appears, tells the viewers that the movie's over and orders them to go home, then runs away.

== Voice cast ==
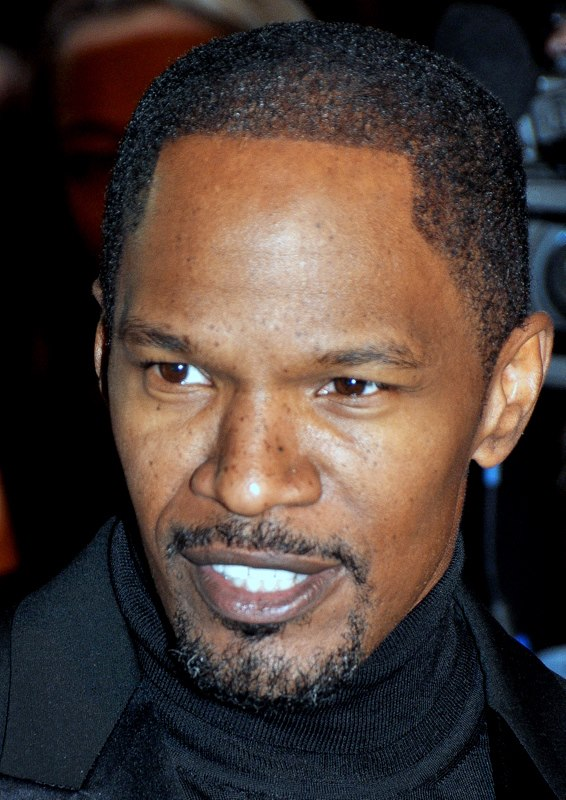
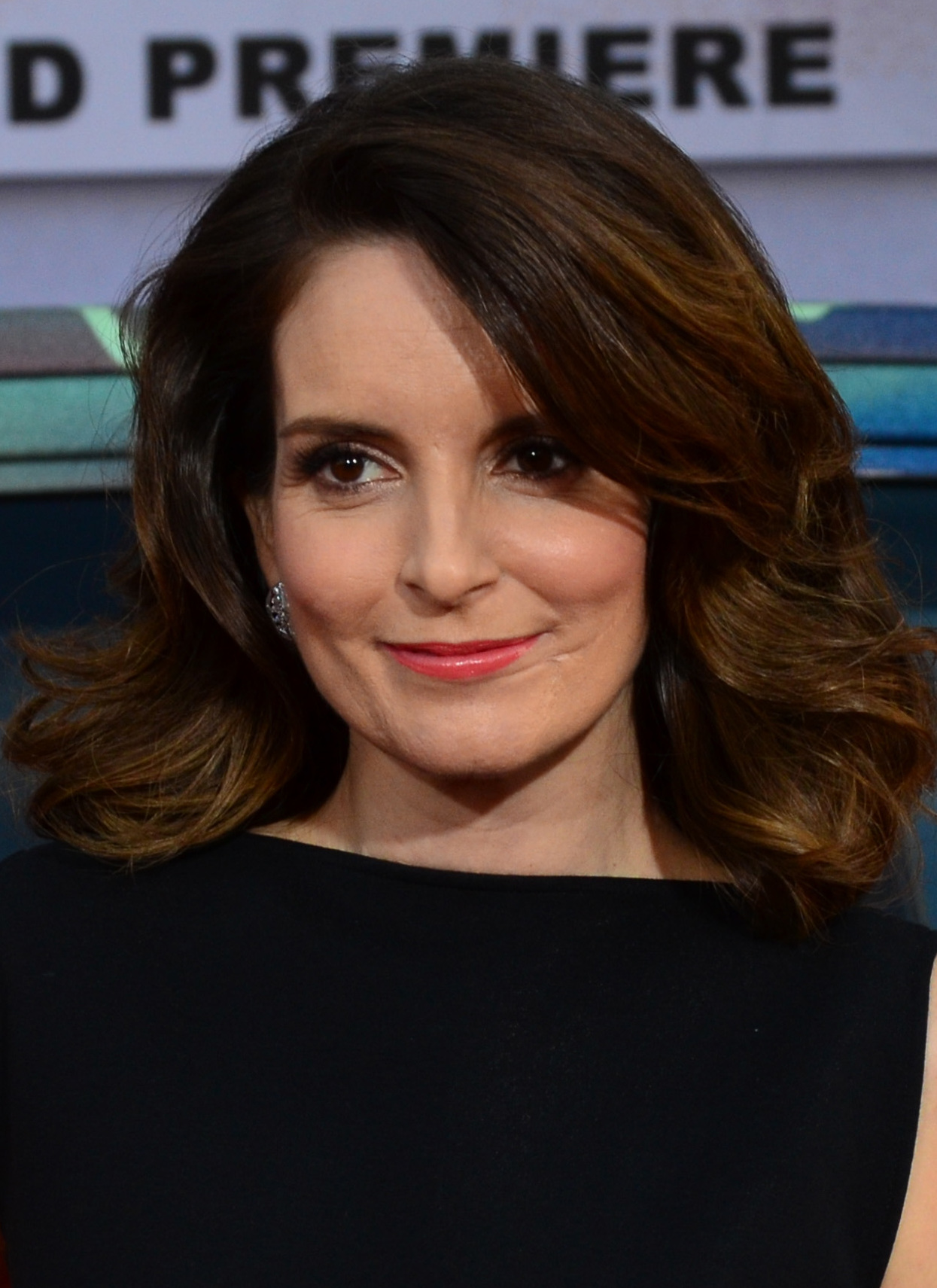
Jamie Foxx (left) in 2013 and Tina Fey in 2014. They voiced Joe Gardner and 22, respectively.
- Jamie Foxx as Joe Gardner, a jazz pianist and music teacher
- Tina Fey as 22, a cynical soul with a dim view of life on Earth
- Graham Norton as Moonwind, a spiritual sign twirler
- Rachel House as Terry, an obsessive soul counter
- Alice Braga, Richard Ayoade, Wes Studi, Fortune Feimster, and Zenobia Shroff as the five soul counselors in the Great Before who are all named Jerry
- Phylicia Rashad as Libba Gardner, Joe's mother, who works as a seamstress
- Donnell Rawlings as Dez, Joe's barber
- Questlove as Lamont "Curley" Baker, a drummer in Dorothea Williams' band and a former student of Joe's
- Angela Bassett as Dorothea Williams, a jazz saxophonist

Additionally, Daveed Diggs plays Paul, Joe's neighborhood frenemy; Cora Champommier plays Connie, one of Joe's middle school band students; Margo Hall and Rhodessa Jones play Melba and Lulu, Libba's co-workers; June Squibb plays Gerel, a soul who meets Joe before going to the Great Beyond; Esther Chae plays Miho, a bassist in Williams' band. Cody Chesnutt provides his vocals, from his song "Parting Ways", as a street singer with a guitar.

Sakina Jaffrey, Calum Grant, Laura Mooney, Peggy Flood, Ochuwa Oghie, Jeannie Tirado, and Cathy Cavadini provide the voices of Doctor, Hedge Fund Manager, Therapy Cat Lady, Marge, Dancerstar, Principal Arroyo, and Dreamerwind.

== Production ==
=== Development and writing ===
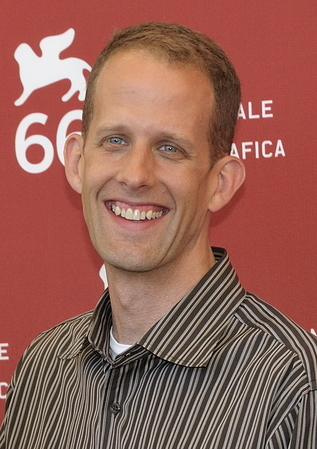
Director Pete Docter

Soul began development in January 2016 following the announcement of the 88th Academy Awards when director Pete Docter had pitched an idea for a new film to then-studio head of Pixar John Lasseter. Docter pondered the origins of human personalities with the concept of determinism. In his first meeting with co-writer Mike Jones, Docter pitched an idea set in the astral plane involving souls with personalities. The film spent four years in production, with an approximate $150 million budget.

Docter and Jones worked on the development of the main character for about two years. Initial ideas included portraying Joe as a scientist, which did not feel "so naturally pure". Pixar eventually settled on portraying the film's main character as a musician because they wanted an appealing profession for the audience. According to Docter, once the creative team decided the main character played jazz music, the filmmakers chose to make him African-American due to the race being tied to jazz history.

With co-writer Kemp Powers's help, Docter wrote Joe during the film's early development. Powers's initial contract was 12-weeks long, but was later extended. After making extensive contributions to the film, Powers became a co-director, making him Pixar's first African-American co-director. Powers based several elements of Joe on his personal life, but wanted the character to "transcend [his] own experience" in order to make him more accessible. Powers also placed additional emphasis on authentically depicting Joe's relationships within the black community. In order to portray accurately African-American culture within the film, Pixar worked closely with an internal "Cultural Trust" composed of black Pixar employees, and hired several consultants. These consultants included musicians Herbie Hancock, Terri Lyne Carrington, Quincy Jones, and Jon Batiste; educator Johnnetta Cole; and stars Questlove and Diggs.

The idea of Joe's soul entering the body of a therapy cat came from Mike Jones. Docter and Powers appreciated the idea, as it allowed Joe to "be able to look at his own life from a different perspective" and appreciate it. According to Murray, the filmmakers were undecided on Soul's ending before the last screening. Some test versions of the film ended featuring Joe pondering whether to pass on to the Great Beyond; returning to Earth a year later; or staying in the Great Before as a mentor. Initial storyboards featured several brief scenes showing 22's life on Earth after her new birth, including one of her reuniting with Joe in New York. These scenes were ultimately discarded.

=== Casting ===
In August 2019, it was announced that Jamie Foxx, Tina Fey, Questlove, Phylicia Rashad and Daveed Diggs had joined the cast. In March 2020, Angela Bassett announced she was cast in the film. During the release of the film's trailer in October 2020, Richard Ayoade, Graham Norton, Rachel House, Alice Braga, Wes Studi, Fortune Feimster, Zenobia Shroff, Donnell Rawlings and June Squibb were also announced to be in the cast.

Docter said Jamie Foxx (himself a classically trained pianist) was perfect for Joe, citing his comedic skills and musical background. Foxx related the film's "bittersweet [feeling] of losing someone but gaining a vision of joy".

Tina Fey, in addition to voicing 22, also contributed to the screenplay, helping to write her character's lines. She considered the film, in the context of the COVID-19 pandemic, a "helpful reminder that [life] isn't defined by achievement or attainment".

=== Animation and design ===
Soul is Pixar's first film to feature an African-American lead. Pixar and Docter were mindful of the history of racist imagery (particularly caricatured depictions of African-Americans) in animation and wanted to create black characters as well as integrate authentic African-American culture into the film's "DNA" to prevent caricatures, stereotypes, and tropes. Pixar sought to capture the fine details of the characters, including the textures of black hair and the way light plays on various tones of black skin. According to Powers, the animators used lighting in emphasizing the character's ethnic features. Cinematographer Bradford Young worked as a lighting consultant on the film.

Animators used footage of several music performers, including Batiste, as reference for the film's musical sequences. By capturing MIDI data from the sessions, animators retraced the exact key being played on the piano with each note and animated the performances authentically. According to Docter, the animators assigned to specific musical instruments often either had experience playing them or a great appreciation for them.

The souls were animated by the filmmakers in a "vaporous", "ethereal", and "non-physical" way. Souls were designed to depict various religious and cultural outlooks. The designs were also inspired by early drawings made by Docter. Animators created two designs for the souls in the film: one for the new souls in "The Great Before" (described as "very cute, very appealing, with simple, rounded shapes" by supervising animator Jude Brownbill) and one for mentor souls (feature distinctive characteristics since they have been on Earth). They differentiated souls from ghosts by adjusting their color palette accordingly. Animating the souls' designs was challenging and substantial. According to Murray, several artists helped create the souls' designs by giving their suggestions and opinions on how they should look.

The design of soul counselors ("Jerrys") originated from line drawings made by story artist Aphton Corbin Alcordo. Additional artist Deanna Marsigliese created wire sculptures of them, and the design was finalized. Together, with the design of "Terry", they were seen by critics as a reference to Osvaldo Cavandoli's 1971 Italian animated series La Linea.

Soul's fantastical elements were difficult to render. To address the issue, Docter referred to his film Inside Out (2015), where the filmmakers personified through physicality. For the Great Before, the filmmakers did not want it to be based in any specific culture given its nature of universality. They sought inspiration from the architecture of 1930s–1960s world's fairs, making a "sense of awe and importance". Production designer Steve Pilcher believed in the simplicity of the Great Before, saying that it was complicated and naive. According to Docter, the aim of the design was to "make a grand statement about learning and knowledge." The personality pavilions were designed to be "abstract-looking shapes" as a literal interpretation of the abstract ideas they represent. For the Great Beyond, the filmmakers conceptualized "going toward the light", which they believed the audience would understand.

The astral plane sequence took months to create, despite the actual scene having a short duration. Effects supervisor Bill Watral compared the sequence to the shower scene from Psycho (1960), taking a long time to film in spite of the actual short time span. During this sequence, filmmakers painstakingly animated sands, liquids, and rocks for the brief sequence.

To animate New York, the filmmakers explored jazz clubs and pizzerias for inspiration. A barbershop scene received additional input from Powers. The animation style moved away from photorealism, depicting the city as distorted and crooked.

=== Music ===
Musicians Trent Reznor and Atticus Ross of Nine Inch Nails composed an ambient score for the metaphysical segments of the film, while Jon Batiste composed a number of original jazz songs for the New York City-based segments of the film. Batiste created a "user-friendly jazz", which felt "authentic" but could still be appreciated by a general audience. Ross composed a "somewhat ominous" musical cue in the afterlife walkway scene, which also incorporated real-world sounds. Reznor and Ross were brought in on the recommendation of sound designer Ren Klyce, who had worked extensively with the duo on David Fincher films.

The score and the original songs from Soul were released in two vinyl-exclusive albums, while also compiled onto a single digital album. "It's All Right", the end credits song performed by Batiste, was originally recorded by The Impressions. A second cover of the song, a duet between Batiste and British soul singer Celeste, was released alongside the film.

== Release ==
=== Theatrical and streaming ===
Soul had its premiere on October 11, 2020, at the BFI London Film Festival. It was initially scheduled for theatrical release in the United States on June 19, 2020, but was later pushed back to November 20, 2020, in response to the COVID-19 pandemic, before Disney decided to release the film on Disney+ on December 25, 2020. Unlike Mulan, Soul was not released through Disney+ Premier Access, making it free for all subscribers. On December 5, 2023, it was announced that Soul, as well as Turning Red (2022) and Luca (2021), would be released in theaters in the United States throughout early 2024, with Soul being released on January 12, 2024.

In international markets where Disney+ was not available, Soul was released theatrically. These included China, the Philippines, Malaysia, Taiwan, Thailand, Singapore, among others. The film was included in their lineups of the 2020 Cannes Film Festival and the Rome Film Festival; it opened on October 15. In theaters, Soul was intended to be accompanied by SparkShorts short film Burrow, but it premiered on Disney+ instead; the short would accompany the film's 2024 theatrical release. A prequel short to Soul was released in 2021, titled 22 vs. Earth. It focuses on 22 leading a rebellion against her superiors, directed by Kevin Nolting (the film's editor and creative advisor).

=== Home media ===
Walt Disney Studios Home Entertainment released Soul on Ultra HD Blu-ray, Blu-ray, DVD, and digital download on March 23, 2021. Physical copies contain an audio commentary, behind-the-scenes featurettes, and deleted scenes.

== Reception ==
=== Box office ===
Soul grossed $946,154 domestically and $121 million in other territories, for a worldwide total gross of $122 million. It grossed $7.65 million in its opening weekend in 10 markets, including $5.5 million from China. By February 2021, it had become the highest-grossing Pixar release ever in Russia ($18.3 million), Ukraine ($1.9 million) and Saudi Arabia ($5.9 million). Its top international markets at that point were China ($57.9 million), Russia, South Korea ($14.8 million), Taiwan ($6.4 million) and Saudi Arabia. The 2024 re-release debuted outside top-10 for a first weekend of under $431,840. By the end of its run, its domestic gross was $946,154.

=== Streaming viewership ===
Following the release of Soul on Disney+, research firm Screen Engine reported that 13 percent of viewers watched the film, and it over-indexed among parents, particularly mothers. The company also said that Soul was among the most-watched straight-to-streaming titles of the year, behind Hamilton and Wonder Woman 1984. On December 21–27, 2020, the film gathered 1.669 billion minutes of watch time, making it the number 1 streaming title that week. Nielsen reported that Wonder Woman 1984, with 2.252 billion minutes of streaming on HBO Max, had surpassed Soul, with 1.7 billion minutes on Disney+, in streaming numbers on Christmas weekend. Samba TV later reported that 2.4 million households streamed the film over its opening weekend. Nielsen reported that Soul was the most streamed film across all platforms, during the week from January 4–10, 2021.

=== Critical response ===
Soul received critical acclaim. On the review aggregator website Rotten Tomatoes, the film holds an approval rating of 95% based on 358 reviews, with an average rating of 8.3/10. The consensus reads; "A film as beautiful to contemplate as it is to behold, Soul proves Pixar's power to deliver outstanding all-ages entertainment remains undimmed." Metacritic, which uses a weighted average, assigned Soul a score of 83 out of 100 based on 55 critics, indicating "universal acclaim".

Several journalists praised Soul for its craftsmanship, which they saw as an exercise of Docter's expertise, as the film was considered a return of Pixar's form by some critics. Leslie Felperin (The Hollywood Reporter) and Jason Solomons (TheWrap) described the film as its peak, with Solomons characterized its "colorful visuals and gentle wisdom". A. O. Scott of The New York Times expressed its "combination of skill, feeling, and inspiration".

The story, characters, and music were also commended. Kaleem Aftab of IndieWire felt the narrative "[veered] off in many unexpected directions, so that even the inevitable end point feels just right." USA Today's Brian Truitt commended the performances of Foxx and Fey. For Time Out Dubai, Whelan Barzey believed Joe's story could appeal to many generations. Felperin and Peter Travers (ABC News) praised the musical score, calling it "sublime". Truitt and Travers credited Batiste, Reznor, and Ross for their music merits.

Reviews were not uniformly positive. Kirsten Acuna from Insider felt that "the studio had taken a few steps backward" in their racial "sensitivity" as Soul used the same trope of "turning Black characters into creatures". Molly Freeman of Screen Rant acknowledged the film's "message about the meaning of life and finding purpose, but it's messy and only made muddier by the questions the movie sets up then fails to answer. The result is Soul loses much of its emotional impact, with the third act playing out more like a rush to the finish line of the story without giving as much weight to the themes and emotional throughline of the film." Charles Pulliam-Moore of Gizmodo wrote that "Soul comes across less like an earnest and casual celebration of everyday Blackness, and more like a twee depiction of it that's meant for white audiences' consumption." Namwali Serpell of The New Yorker published an extensive critical essay of the film, citing among other issues, "Not only does Twenty-two use Joe as a vehicle but the movie must also make the grandiose and grotesque claim that he has learned to live through her" and concluding that "The most glaring artistic error in 'Soul' is its misprision—its elision, really—of what soul means for black culture."

=== Accolades ===
At the 93rd Academy Awards, Soul received a nomination for Best Sound, and won Best Animated Feature and Best Original Score. Its other nominations include ten Annie Awards (winning seven), three British Academy Film Awards (winning two), a Critics' Choice Movie Award (which it won), and two Golden Globe Awards (winning both). The National Board of Review and the American Film Institute named Soul one of the ten-best films of 2020; it also won the National Board of Review's Best Animated Film award.
