= Mike Jones (screenwriter) =

American screenwriter (born 1971)

- Born: 1971 (age 54–55); San Antonio, Texas, U.S.
- Occupations: Screenwriter, journalist
- Years active: 1995–present

Mike Jones (born 1971) is an American filmmaker. He serves as a writer and director at Pixar Animation Studios and has co-written the studio's animated feature films Soul (2020), Luca (2021) and Elio (2025). He also wrote and directed Dream Productions, a 4-part limited series set in the world of Inside Out.

== Career ==
Jones was born in San Antonio, Texas, and graduated from New York University's Tisch School of the Arts for film. He began his career as an entertainment journalist working as Filmmaker Magazine's Managing Editor and IndieWire's Executive Editor.

His first screenplay, EvenHand, was produced in 2001 and screened at the AFI Film Festival, Tribeca Film Festival, and South by Southwest.

Jones did an uncredited rewrite of City of Ghosts, directed by Matt Dillon, and has since written scripts for Columbia Pictures, United Artists, HBO, Warner Bros. Pictures, Sony Pictures Animation, Searchlight Pictures, and Metro-Goldwyn-Mayer.

During the 2007-2008 Writers Guild of America strike he became the Managing Editor of Film Festivals for Variety, where he covered the film festival and independent film beats in Variety, Daily Variety, and in a blog called The Circuit.

In 2011, his script In the Event of a Moon Disaster was featured on The Black List and optioned by FilmNation Entertainment.

In 2013–2014, Jones wrote the English adaptations of Studio Ghibli films The Wind Rises and The Tale of Princess Kaguya, as well as a feature adaptation of Sesame Street.

In 2026, he was nominated for a Children's and Family Emmy for Outstanding Animated Series for his work as an executive producer on Dream Productions and a Children's and Family Emmy for Outstanding Directing for an Animated Series for his work as a director on Dream Productions.

=== Filmography ===
- 2002: Evenhand - writer
- 2013: The Tale of The Princess Kaguya - writer (English version)
- 2013: The Wind Rises - writer (English version)
- 2020: Soul - writer
- 2021: Luca - writer
- 2024: Dream Productions - writer, director, showrunner
- 2025: Elio - writer

==== Senior creative team ====
- 2017: Coco
- 2018: Incredibles 2
- 2019: Toy Story 4
- 2022: Turning Red
- 2022: Lightyear
- 2023: Elemental
- 2024: Inside Out 2
