= The Bellflower Bunnies season 2 =

The Bellflower Bunnies
- Season 2
- The 2005 Region 2 box set of the original French series. Standing up: Papa Bramble, Aunt Zinnia. Below: Dandelion, Poppy, Periwinkle, Violet and Mistletoe.
- No. of episodes: 22

Release
- Original network: TF1 (France)
- Original release: 22 September 2004 – 23 February 2005

Season chronology
- ← Previous; Season 1 Next → Season 3

The second season of The Bellflower Bunnies, a children's animated series based on the Beechwood Bunny Tales books by Geneviève Huriet and Loïc Jouannigot, aired on the French television network TF1 from 22 September 2004 to 23 February 2005. It was directed by Eric Berthier, produced by Patricia Robert and written by Valérie Baranski.

Production on this season, which comprised twenty-two episodes, lasted from July 2003 to October 2004. While TF1 remained on board, a new roster of voice actors, crew and companies participated. Among them were Paul Cadieux, a staff member of Quebec's Megafun studio; Canadian talents Julie Burroughs, Hugolin Chevrette and Elisabeth Lenormand; and China's Hangzhou Flying Dragon Cartoon.

The episodes were originally broadcast on TF! Jeunesse, the children's service of TF1, every Wednesday morning. The sole exception was "Noël chez les Passiflore", a holiday episode which premiered on a Saturday. Until 2014, this season aired in continuous rotation on France's Disney Junior channel. It has also been seen on Canada's TFO, Germany's Kinderkanal (KI.KA), and the Middle East's Al Jazeera Children's Channel.

== Production ==
Co-production partners for this season included France's TF1, Euro Visual, Big Cash, and that country's department of Walt Disney Television. In Canada, they consisted of animation studio Tooncan and production company Megafun, both located in Montreal, Quebec. Also joining the production was China's Hangzhou Flying Dragon Cartoon, which handled animation duties.

The French voice cast consisted of Flora Balzano (who played Mistletoe), Julie Burroughs, Hugolin Chevrette (who played Poppy), Mario Desmarais, Antoine Durand, Marylène Gargour, Annie Girard, Hélène Lasnier and Elisabeth Lenormand. The English dub starred Danielle Desormeaux, Anik Matern, Holly Gauthier-Frankel, (Note: Credited as Holly Gauthier-Frankle.) Eleanor Noble, Matt Holland, Joanna Noyes, Liz Mac Rae, Simon Peacock and Laura Teasdale.

Eric Berthier, who has worked on several French television series, replaced Moran Caouissin as the director. Paul Cadieux, a Megafun staff member, served as executive co-producer; Yves Pont and Franck Algard, through their company Euro Visual, became executive producers. Alice Willis took over music scoring duties, and also played piano and keyboard.

Returning from the first season were screenwriter Valérie Baranski, story editor Fabrice Ziolkowski and producer Patricia Robert, along with Reanud Bouet in the backgrounds department, and Arnold Gransac on layouts. Loïc Jouannigot, the illustrator of the original books, was credited under "characters, location & props creation".

== Awards and merchandise ==
The Bellflower Bunnies won three awards at the 6th Festival International du Film de TV de Luchon in 2005, one of which was the "Ecran Jeunesse" in the Animation category.

On 21 October 2005, Éditions Milan published Le grand livre animé de la famille Passiflore (ISBN 2-7459-1569-X), a ten-page pop-up book featuring five scenes from the show.

== Episodes ==
Each episode in this season runs 22 minutes in length. The first nine episodes are based on original Beechwood Bunny Tales, and the rest are written by Baranski.

Official no. (Note: O = Corresponds to the official order as listed by Institut National de l'Audiovisuel (INA) and AnimezVous.com.)	Broadcast no. (Note: B = Corresponds to TF1's broadcast schedule.)	French title English title	Beechwood Bunny Tale	Air date (in France)
5–1	5–1	"L'exploit de Tante Zinia" "Born to Be Bunnies"	L'exploit de tante Zinia	22 September 2004
Aunt Zinnia takes part in a women's cycling competition, with nephew Poppy as her companion. But as the race goes on, they get swept away in a river and end up at a mill.
6–2	8–4	"Les Passiflore mènent l'enquête" "Bunnies on a Case"	Les Passiflore mènent l'enquête	13 October 2004
After spring cleaning, the Bellflower children search for Aunt Zinnia's stolen trophy. Violette thinks some lop-eared jackrabbit family took it. They befriend the lop rabbit girl Gamba, and Violette accompanied by Periwinkle continue to find the trophy. The others seek the help of an organization called the Secret Mole Network. Violette retrieves the trophy from a mountain goat. That night the Bellflowers celebrate with the jackrabbits.
7–3	6–2	"Les beignets flambés" "Refried Donuts"	Les beignets flambés	29 September 2004
Left alone by Bramble and Zinnia, the five young rabbits decide to make some fried doughnuts, which happens to be apple fritters. During the attempt, however, they soon set the house on fire by accident.
8–4	17–13	"Noël chez les Passiflore" "A Christmas Tail"	Le Noël des Passiflore	25 December 2004
The Bellflower family make their Christmas preparations. The children rescue a stranded reindeer occupied by three Christmas Elves led one of them named Niles, then they work all night to help them launch to the North Pole, but Dandelion takes the beacon to head there himself.
9–5	7–3	"Le jardin de Dentdelion" "A Garden for Dandelion"	Dandelion's Vanishing Vegetable Garden (Le jardin de Dentdelion Passiflore)	6 October 2004
Dandelion plants his first garden, but a clever turtle named Tallulah targets it and makes him very angry. However Tallulah persuades Dandelion to find powerful water at a unique spring, but when Dandelion tries to get some water, he almost drowns to death, but Mistletoe saves his life.
10–6	9–5	"L'invention d'Onésime" "Papa Bramble's Invention"	L'invention d'Onésime Passiflore	20 October 2004
Periwinkle shares his dreams with Pimpernelle to go to Pirate Island. Next morning Bramble shows off his new invention: a water boat for rabbits, to the chagrin of the villagers. That night, Periwinkle takes Pimpernelle to the island, but get captured by the otters, who shows them the treasure is passion berries. Periwinkle offers the otters to get supplied with delicious foods in exchange for the passion berries and Bramble's invention is accepted.
11–7	10–6	"L'ogre Kazoar" "Kazoar the Ogre"	Loosely follows storyline of Aunt Zinnia and the Ogre (Tante Zinia et l'ogre Kazoar)	27 October 2004
Poppy sets off to get some cabbage for Violette as a birthday present after being almost unable to find anything new. While trying to look for the birthday present, he encounters a settlement of snooty, arrogant and narrow-minded Angora Rabbits who remain pompously xenophobic and refusing to help Poppy due to his kind being unrefined as him. Then, with help from Sylvester, an Angora rabbit, he must face Kazoar the Ogre in order to get the supply from the fields.
12–8	12–8	"En avant la musique" "Face the Music"	En avant la musique!	17 November 2004
The Bellflower children decide to surprise Zinnia and Bramble with music. A travelling musician named Aldo comes to shelter in the house from some geese. While Violette, Dandelion and Mistletoe help Aldo to get back his instrument, Poppy and Periwinkle keep an eye on him. The children find out that Aldo is constantly harassed to play for the geese led by Constance and her aid Olga, so the rabbit siblings understood how all of this happen, and they displease the geese to protect Aldo, and Aldo thankfully gives a special music lesson for everyone.
13–9	11–7	"Le premier bal d'Agaric" "Periwinkle's First Dance"	Periwinkle at the Full Moon Ball (Le premier bal d'Agaric Passiflore)	10 November 2004
Tricked by Magda the magpie, Periwinkle desperately learns some dance steps from Magda's colleagues that could either embarrass his own family or delight the villagers of Blueberry Hill.
14–10	26–22	"Dentdelion et le bébé marmotte" "Dandelion and the Baby Groundhog"	Teleplay by Valérie Baranski	23 February 2005
Dandelion takes care of a baby groundhog from Grandfather Theo's garden, but must face a difficult challenge returning it to the parents after Nettles, Theo's vile neighbour, keeps threatening it.
15–11	13–9	"La clé du bonheur" "The Key to Happiness"	Teleplay by Valérie Baranski	24 November 2004
During a treasure hunt, an old riddle from their great-grandfather, Simon, leads Poppy and Periwinkle to an ancient library hidden within an oak tree.
16–12	14–10	"Pirouette sous les feux de la rampe" "In the Limelight"	Teleplay by Valérie Baranski	1 December 2004
Violette is chosen to perform on the trapeze when a circus run by Gionixio Salterello comes to Blueberry Hill, but Mistletoe tries to prove he can do it better, which led to crazy results. This happened to be Violette almost getting herself killed while trying to perform an acrobat trick without a harness, but thankfully Mistletoe saved her life.
17–13	15–11	"Coup de foudre aux Airelles" "Love at First Sight"	Teleplay by Valérie Baranski	8 December 2004
While Poppy investigates a neighbourhood robbery for his siblings' new newspaper, he falls in love with a rabbit girl named Pamela, also known as Pammy. However, their friendship soon takes an unexpected turn for the worse when Poppy discovers a strange yet near-unbearable secret which connects the robbery and Pammy for a simple reason.
18–14	22–18	"Au pays des fantômes" "In Ghost Country"	Teleplay by Valérie Baranski	26 January 2005
The Bellflower children learn about a haunted lighthouse from their friend Anthony, and encounter weird, unexplained sounds during their stay in Meadow County.
19–15	21–17	"Dentdelion fait son cinéma" "The Silver Screen"	Teleplay by Valérie Baranski	19 January 2005
After watching a movie, the little rabbits search for their brother Dandelion, who is on a mission to find a young actor's teddy bear after witnessing the film looking confused and stubborn.
20–16	23–19	"Agaric et le sorcier" "Periwinkle and the Witch Doctor"	Teleplay by Valérie Baranski	2 February 2005
A rabbit wizard's spell makes Periwinkle behave strangely; the family helps him when they discover the cause.
21–17	18–14	"Le pacte du lac" "The Monster of Blueberry Lake"	Teleplay by Valérie Baranski	29 December 2004
When two evil eagles threaten the village, the brave bunnies must save Blueberry Hill by building a monster to scare them off with help from Pimpernelle and some beaver men, in which one of the beavers is called Wakko.
22–18	16–12	"Le secret d'Onésime" "Papa Bramble's Secret"	Teleplay by Valérie Baranski	15 December 2004
Mistletoe wants to be a beekeeper like Papa Bramble, but first he must learn about the serious responsibility and risks of that job.
23–19	19–15	"Vive les vacances" "Holiday with Love"	Teleplay by Valérie Baranski	5 January 2005
Mistletoe befriends Gamba, Violette's best friend, but then the two suddenly come face to face with the foxes which happen to be the gangsters, Roderick and Marmaduke.
24–20	20–16	"Chez les petits savants" "At the Science Academy"	Teleplay by Valérie Baranski	12 January 2005
At the request of Ernest Babine, a famous chemist, Poppy attends a school for young scientists. But while doing so, the smart and prodigal Bellflower sibling feels he will miss his family a lot.
25–21	24–20	"Au cœur de la source" "The Heart of the Spring"	Teleplay by Valérie Baranski	9 February 2005
Violette and Periwinkle come to the rescue of a large skunk colony in which a skunk family consisting of a mother, father and son are amongst them whose spring has dried up because of a boar thug named Bearwig, who is using the spring water to build a jacuzzi.
26–22	25–21	"Sacrée Nounou" "Hairy Nanny"	Teleplay by Valérie Baranski	16 February 2005
Though they promise to be obedient for two days, three of the young rabbits, Poppy, Violette and Mistletoe, defy the expectations of Theo, and his pet dog Grumps, by going down a snow slope, which causes both Periwinkle and Grumps to be worried for the three. Yet this accidently created issues.

== DVD releases ==
=== Region 1 ===
On 12 April 2005, the Direct Source company released four DVD titles, in association with Filmoption International: Tales, Adventures, Friends, and Holidays. Like their Season 1 predecessors, these volumes also consisted of two episodes each; this time, the original French audio is provided along with the English dub. On 21 February 2006, Tales and Adventures were reissued together, as were Friends and Holidays.

Title	Episodes on disc (#)
The Bellflower Bunnies: Tales	7 & 16
The Bellflower Bunnies: Holidays	13 & 19
The Bellflower Bunnies: Adventures	15 & 26
The Bellflower Bunnies & Friends	24 & 25

=== Region 2 ===
==== France ====
From October 2004 to July 2005, TF1, Beez Entertainment and Seven Sept brought out five volumes of the show's second season. The first three consisted of four episodes each, and the last two consisted of five; all of them contained the original French episodes and their English counterparts. On 27 October 2005, all of these volumes, excluding the very first one from 2003, were packaged into a single box set, which was reissued on 11 October 2006, with a plush doll of Dandelion.

Title	Release date	# of episodes	Episodes on disc
La Famille Passiflore, Volume 1	16 November 2004	4	5, 7, 9 & 11
La Famille Passiflore, Volume 2	6 January 2005	4	6, 8, 10 & 12
La Famille Passiflore, Volume 3	10 March 2005	4	13-16
La Famille Passiflore, Volume 4	19 May 2005	5	17-21
La Famille Passiflore, Volume 5	12 July 2005	5	22-26

==== Germany ====
Episodes 5–8 in the official series order were released by edelkids on 22 February 2008, in time for Easter. This came about as a result of the show's success on local television. The series continued on 14 August 2008 with episodes 9–16. As with the first volume, colouring pages and edelkids previews were used as special features.

Title	Release date
Die Häschenbande, Folge 2	22 February 2008
Die Häschenbande, Folge 3	14 August 2008
Die Häschenbande, Folge 4	14 August 2008

==== Hungary ====
On 13 June 2005, V.I.P Art Kft. of Budapest released six episodes of season 2 on three discs (under the franchise name Tappancs család):

Hungarian titles	English titles
"Szelíd biciklisták" / "Nyomozó nyulak"	"Born to Be Bunnies" / "Bunnies on a Case"
"Tappancs Dani kertecskéje" / "Tappancs Papa találmánya"	"A Garden for Dandelion" / "Papa Bramble's Invention"
"Túlsütött fánk" / "Karácsonyi történet"	"Refried Donuts" / "A Christmas Tail"

== See also ==
- List of The Bellflower Bunnies episodes
