= The Bellflower Bunnies season 1 =

The Bellflower Bunnies
- Season 1
- The 2003 PAL VHS/Region 2 cover of the original French episodes. From left to right: Pirouette, (Note: For the English version of season 2, Pirouette was renamed Violet (as she was called in Gareth Stevens' translations).) Periwinkle, Dandelion, Poppy, and Papa Bramble.
- No. of episodes: 4

Release
- Original network: TF1 (France)
- Original release: 24 December – 28 December 2001

Season chronology
- Next → Season 2

The first season of The Bellflower Bunnies, a children's animated series based on the Beechwood Bunny Tales books by Geneviève Huriet and Loïc Jouannigot, aired on France's TF1 network during the week of 24 December 2001, at 7:00 a.m. Central European Time. Consisting of four episodes, it was directed by French animator Moran Caouissin, produced by Patricia Robert, and written by Valérie Baranski. The music was composed by Baranski and Daniel Scott. A handful of crew members from this season would be carried over for future episodes.

The episodes follow the adventures of the Bellflowers, a family of seven rabbits who live in the community of Beechwood Grove. The two adults, Papa Bramble and Aunt Zinnia, take care of their five children: Periwinkle, Poppy, Mistletoe, Dandelion and Violet. "Room to Move", the first episode in the official production order, deals with the family's move to their new house at Blueberry Hill. (Note: In the Beechwood Bunny Tale, Family Moving Day, the house was called The Berries.)

The first season has been broadcast on TF! Jeunesse, the children's service of TF1, as well as South Korea's Educational Broadcasting System (EBS), CBBC in the United Kingdom, and Germany's Kinderkanal (KI.KA) and ZDF among others. Since early 2003, it has been made available on DVD in the United States, France, Germany and South Korea.

== Production ==
The season was a co-production of France's TF1, its subsidiaries Protécréa and Banco Production, and Canada's TVA International. It was produced in association with France's Sofica Valor 6 and Luxembourg's Melusine, and with the participation of the Centre National de la Cinématographie (CNC). Production began in late 2000 at a cost of €380,000 (C$610,000) per episode. Graphics and Animation of Antwerp, Belgium, (Note: The company has since been renamed DeFamilieJanssen (DFJ).) a subsidiary of Luxembourg's Studio 352, designed the layouts for these episodes, and North Korea's SEK Studio handled overseas animation duties. Premium Sound, based in Montreal, was responsible for the sound effects, design, dialogue editing, foley and mix. Early during the show's production, the crew created a one-minute promotional pilot, in which a little mouse tells of the show's premise and introduces its main characters.

This season represented TF1 International at the conferences of the National Association of Television Program Executives (NATPE) in early 2001 and 2002, and MIPTV Media Market in April 2001. For both events, the four episodes were promoted as "specials".

The first two episodes of the series were planned to air on TF1 in November 2001, with the next two to follow in December. Ultimately, all four premiered in late December on TF! Jeunesse.

== Cast and crew ==
The first season's English voice cast included Rhonda Millar (who played two characters, Periwinkle and Pirouette), as well as Tom Clarke-Hill, Tom Eastwood, Regine Candler and Joanna Ruiz Rodriguez. Their voices were recorded at Ten Pin Alley, a company based in Gloucestershire, England.

The director of this season, Moran Caouissin, was previously involved in DuckTales the Movie: Treasure of the Lost Lamp as an animator. Character designer Josette Zagar previously worked in the trace and paint department for The Twelve Tasks of Asterix. Co-producer Louis Fournier once served Cinar as Vice President of Sales & Co-productions; during this season's production, he was President of TVA International's Youth and Animation Unit. Fournier's partner, Dominique Mendel, became Vice President of Montreal's Spectra Animation in November 2004. Daniel Scott, a Canadian composer who created the theme for Wimzie's House, teamed up with Valérie Baranski to write the score and songs. Several more would return for the next season: screenwriter Baranski, producer Patricia Robert, and story editor Fabrice Ziolkowski to name a few.

== Reception ==
José Evrard of France's DVDcritiques.com wrote of The Bellflower Bunnies' first season: "[It] combines quality entertainment with a charming style that can be found in children's books. The stories, full of tenderness, emotion and humour, develop in a magical world where everything is done to give the young viewer true moments of joy! Every event with our little heroes—so mischievous and affectionate—is a delight." In the United States, Dove Foundation reviewer Linda Eagle praised the episodes as "an adorable piece of animation", and gave both Region 1 DVDs four stars out of five.

== Episodes ==
This season, based entirely on books in the Beechwood Bunny Tales series, is about 92 minutes long. In each episode, the Bellflower children perform a song whose title does not appear in the credits.

Official no. (Note: O = Corresponds to the official order as listed by Institut National de l'Audiovisuel (INA) and AnimezVous.com.)	Broadcast no. (Note: B = Corresponds to TF1's broadcast schedule.)	French title English title	Beechwood Bunny Tale	Song	Air date (in France)
1	2	"Le déménagement" "Room to Move"	Family Moving Day (La famille Passiflore déménage)	"Bunnies on the Move"	25 December 2001
The Bellflower children suspect their father, Bramble, is keeping something secret from them. Bramble reveals they will move to a house called Blueberry Cottage. Everyone is excited, except Periwinkle, who misses the house already, and couldn't bring himself to leave his home. A magpie named Magda tries to scare the bunnies out of the house but fails. After the family decorates the house, Periwinkle depressingly and desperately runs away from home. Bramble finds Periwinkle in a small tent by their old house and both the father and son spoke with each other, and in the end, he accepts his new house when Bramble invites him to help build a workshop there. Bramble and Periwinkle warm up to their new neighbors and invite them to an enjoyable party, including Periwinkle's lifelong close friend.
2	3	"Carnaval" "Carnival"	Carnaval chez les Passiflore	"Carnival Time Is Here"	27 December 2001
The Bellflower family prepare for the Venicette Annual Carnival but Dandelion is a bit young to join in, so the other children take full responsibility and Bramble agrees. The children drive in Bramble's "Super Carrot Mobile". At the carnival, two sneaky foxes named Roderick and Marmaduke kidnap Dandelion for their dinner as well as using him as bait for his older siblings to have for their dinner as well. The siblings follow a trail of radishes left by the foxes. After a tricking encounter with the two foxes, the children find Dandelion and meet up with Bramble and Zinnia, who helped them stop the two fox crooks, and they all join in the parade.
3	1	"Vive la glisse" "Slide On"	Vive la glisse!	"Sliding On, Having Fun"	24 December 2001
The Bellflower children are going on vacation to stay with Grandfather Theo and his dog Grumps. Mistletoe has an accident down the stairs and breaks his arm. Grumps and Mistletoe both feeling left out go on a journey to find the rare and legendary Snow Rose on Three Pine Hill. When Mistletoe realizes he took his siblings' racing sled, he forgets the Snow Rose and joins his siblings in time for the race.
4	4	"En ballon" "Balloonatic Bunnies"	En ballon, les Passiflore!	"Up, Up and Away"	28 December 2001
Poppy's new flying invention is put to the test and Poppy reluctantly lets Violette be his co-pilot, but the glider gets wrecked. The Bellflower family rescues two European-accented guinea fowls Lizzie and Lotti (the aviation contest judges) from their hot air balloon. As the children play in the balloon, Poppy inflates it and the rope breaks causing them to go airborne. Eventually they crash land into an uneasy forest called Darkwood Forest. After Poppy and Violette make up, all the siblings build a boat to and down the river they unite with their family and rebuild the glider, in which became a success at last.

== DVD releases ==
=== Region 2 (Europe) ===
==== France ====
The first season was also released by TF1 Vidéo on 23 January 2003 and again on 19 February 2004. Its only special features were a collection of songs from the episodes and a DVD-ROM weblink to the distributor's site.

==== Germany ====
On 22 February 2008, in time for Easter, edelkids released the German-dubbed version as Die Häschenbande, Folge 1. This came about as a result of the show's success on local television. The extras were colouring pages and previews of other edelkids products.

German title	English title
"Ein neues Zuhause"	"Room to Move"
"Peppino in Gefahr"	"Carnival"
"Rackies Schneeabenteuer"	"Slide On"
"Ein gefährlicher Flug"	"Balloonatic Bunnies"

==== Netherlands ====
Under the series title De Knuffel Konijntjes, Dutch FilmWorks B.V. released the first four episodes individually in the mid-2000s; all of these were put together in a box set on 21 March 2006. The third volume in this version, "Hoog in de Lucht" ("Balloonatic Bunnies"), was released several months before #2, "Carnaval" ("Carnival").

Dutch title	English title	Release date
"Verhuizing"	"Room to Move"	8 March 2005
"Hoog in de Lucht"	"Ballonatic Bunnies"	30 August 2005
"Carnaval"	"Carnival"	13 January 2006
"Winterpret"	"Slide On"	20 July 2006

=== Region 1 (North America) ===
As part of a marketing deal with TVA, the English version of Season 1 was distributed on VHS by the Utah-based Feature Films for Families (FFF) in 2001; the Region 1 DVD versions came out on 1 October 2003. Extras on both discs included trailers for other FFF releases and special messages from the distributor's staff.

Title	Episodes
The Bellflower Bunnies, Vol. 1	"Room to Move" / "Carnival"
The Bellflower Bunnies, Vol. 2	"Balloonatic Bunnies" / "Slide On"

=== Region 3 (Asia) ===
The first season was released on DVD and VHS by South Korea's C4U Entertainment in February 2005 as 까르르 토끼 친구들. There, they are titled "이사가는 날" ("Room to Move"), "축제는 즐거워" ("Carnival"), "열기구 대소동" ("Balloonatic Bunnies") and "달려라, 썰매야!" ("Slide On").

== See also ==
- List of The Bellflower Bunnies episodes
