= List of Beechwood Bunny Tales books =

This is a list of books in the Beechwood Bunny Tales (French: La Famille Passiflore) series of children's books. With the exception of the two most recent titles, by Amélie Sarn, most of the books were written by Geneviève Huriet. Loïc Jouannigot has served as the stories' illustrator since its 1987 debut.

In France, the books are published by Éditions Milan. English versions of the first seven titles were issued by Gareth Stevens in 1991 and 1992.

== Original French series ==
Title	Year Published	ISBN #
Le premier bal d'Agaric Passiflore	1987	ISBN 2-86726-189-9
Le jardin de Dentdelion Passiflore	1988	ISBN 2-86726-326-3
Mistouflet Passiflore et le baobab	1989	ISBN 2-86726-407-3
La danse de Romarin Passiflore	1989	ISBN 2-86726-501-0
Tante Zinia et l'ogre Kazoar	1990	ISBN 2-86726-614-9
Le défi de Pirouette Passiflore	1991	ISBN 2-86726-679-3
La famille Passiflore déménage	1992	ISBN 2-86726-777-3
Le Grand livre de la famille Passiflore, Tome 1	1992	ISBN 2-86726-821-4
Le Grand livre de la famille Passiflore, Tome 2	1994	ISBN 2-86726-988-1
Les beignets flambés	1995	ISBN 2-84113-135-1
Carnaval chez les Passiflore	1995	ISBN 2-84113-237-4
Le Grand livre de la famille Passiflore, Tome 3	1996	ISBN 2-84113-446-6
Vive la glisse!	1998	ISBN 2-84113-717-1
Les Passiflore mènent l'enquête	1999	ISBN 2-84113-874-7
En ballon, les Passiflore!	1999	ISBN 2-84113-805-4
Le Grand livre de la famille Passiflore, Tome 4	2000	ISBN 2-7459-0128-1
La leçon de peinture	2000	ISBN 2-7459-0095-1
En avant la musique!	2001	ISBN 2-7459-0319-5
Les aventures des Passiflore	2001	ISBN 2-7459-0457-4
La maison des Passiflore	2001	ISBN 2-7459-0456-6
Bienvenue chez les Passiflore	2001	ISBN 2-7459-0455-8
Une journée chez les Passiflore	2001	ISBN 2-7459-0454-X
Les Passiflore et la maison hantée	2002	ISBN 2-7459-0496-5
Le Noël des Passiflore	2002	ISBN 2-7459-0495-7
Le Grand livre de la famille Passiflore, Tome 5	2003	ISBN 2-7459-0922-3
L'exploit de tante Zinia	2003	ISBN 2-7459-0916-9
L'invention d'Onésime Passiflore	2003	ISBN 2-7459-1146-5
Le Grand livre de la famille Passiflore, Tome 6	2004	ISBN 2-7459-1583-5
Bravo, les Passiflore!	2004	ISBN 2-7459-1554-1
Les Passiflore à la mer	2005	ISBN 2-7459-1788-9
Le Passiflore Express	2005	ISBN 2-7459-1938-5
Le grand livre animé de la famille Passiflore	2005	ISBN 2-7459-1569-X
Le Grand livre de la famille Passiflore, Tome 7	2006	ISBN 2-7459-2096-0
Qu'as-tu fait, Mistouflet?	2006	ISBN 2-7459-2048-0
L'album photo des Passiflore	2007	ISBN 2-7459-2935-6

== English titles ==
Title	Year Published	ISBN #
Periwinkle at the Full Moon Ball	1991	ISBN 0-8368-0525-9
Dandelion's Vanishing Vegetable Garden	1991	ISBN 0-8368-0526-7)
Mistletoe and the Baobab Tree	1991	ISBN 0-8368-0527-5)
Poppy's Dance	1991	ISBN 0-8368-0528-3)
Aunt Zinnia and the Ogre	1992	ISBN 0-8368-0910-6)
Violette's Daring Adventure	1992	ISBN 0-8368-0912-2)
Family Moving Day	1992	ISBN 0-8368-0911-4)

Gareth Stevens also published these books in a complete seven-volume set (ISBN 0-8368-0924-6).
