= List of The Bellflower Bunnies episodes =

Episode list for an animated series

The 2005 Region 2 box set of the original French series. Standing up: Papa Bramble, Aunt Zinnia. Below: Dandelion, Poppy, Periwinkle, Violette and Mistletoe.

The Bellflower Bunnies (French: La Famille Passiflore) is a children's animated series based on the Beechwood Bunny Tales books by Geneviève Huriet, Amélie Sarn and Loïc Jouannigot. It debuted on TF1, a French television network, on 24 December 2001. Many French and Canadian companies have participated in the show's production over the years; TF1 has always been involved. The series is written by Valérie Baranski, and produced by Patricia Robert. Moran Caouissin directed the first season, and Eric Berthier did the last two.

The show centres on the adventures and exploits of the Bellflower family, a clan of seven rabbits who live in Beechwood Grove. The two adults in the family, Papa Bramble and Aunt Zinnia, take care of their five children: Periwinkle, Poppy, Mistletoe, Dandelion and Violette. (Note: In the first four English episodes, Violette retains her original French name, Pirouette.)

The Bellflower Bunnies originally aired on TFOU TV (formerly TF! Jeunesse), the children's service of TF1, and has since appeared on France's local Disney Junior (formerly Playhouse Disney). The series has also been broadcast on CBC Television and TFO in Canada, KI.KA in Germany, Portugal's RTP in the Azores, and in several other countries.

The show has fifty-two episodes: four in the first season, twenty-two in the second, and twenty-six in the third. In the entire series, thirteen are based directly on installments in Beechwood Bunny Tales, published by Milan Presse of France and Gareth Stevens in the United States; the rest are based on scripts by Valérie Baranski. Distributors in Europe, North America, and South Korea have released DVDs of the first two seasons.

== Overview ==
The English episode titles come from Feature Films for Families and Direct Source's Region 1 DVDs, as well as the online schedules of the Al Jazeera Children's Channel in the Middle East (for season 2).

Season	Episodes	Director	Original broadcast (France)	DVD release dates		
Season	Episodes	Director	Original broadcast (France)	Region 1	Region 2	Region 3
1	4	Moran Caouissin	December 2001	1 October 2003	(France) 23 January 2003 (Germany) 22 February 2008 (Netherlands) March 2005 – July 2006	February 2005
2	22	Eric Berthier	September 2004 – February 2005	12 April 2005 (Note: Select episodes only.)	(France) November 2004 – July 2005 (Germany) 22 February 2008 (episodes 5–8); 14 August 2008 (episodes 9–16) (Note: Numbers refer to official production order (see this table).) (Hungary) 13 June 2005	Not released
3	26	Eric Berthier	April 2007 – July 2010	TBA	(France) 4 November 2008 (episodes 1–5); 6 January 2009 (episodes 6–10)	TBA

=== Season 1 ===
Official #	TF1 #	French title	English title	Air date (France)	Original Beechwood Bunny Tale
1	2	"Le déménagement"	"Room to Move"	25 December 2001	Family Moving Day (La famille Passiflore déménage)
2	3	"Carnaval"	"Carnival"	27 December 2001	Carnaval chez les Passiflore
3	1	"Vive la glisse"	"Slide On"	24 December 2001	Vive la glisse!
4	4	"En ballon"	"Balloonatic Bunnies"	28 December 2001	En ballon, les Passiflore!

=== Season 2 ===
Official #	TF1 #	French title	English title	Air date (France)	Original Beechwood Bunny Tale / Source material
5	5	"L'exploit de Tante Zinia"	"Born to Be Bunnies"	22 September 2004	L'exploit de tante Zinia
6	8	"Les Passiflore mènent l'enquête"	"Bunnies on a Case"	13 October 2004	Les Passiflore mènent l'enquête
7	6	"Les beignets flambés"	"Refried Donuts"	29 September 2004	Les beignets flambés
8	17	"Noël chez les Passiflore"	"A Christmas Tail"	25 December 2004	Le Noël des Passiflore
9	7	"Le jardin de Dentdelion"	"A Garden for Dandelion"	6 October 2004	Dandelion's Vanishing Vegetable Garden (Le jardin de Dentdelion Passiflore)
10	9	"L'invention d'Onésime"	"Papa Bramble's Invention"	20 October 2004	L'invention d'Onésime Passiflore
11	10	"L'ogre Kazoar"	"Kazoar the Ogre"	27 October 2004	Loosely follows storyline of Aunt Zinnia and the Ogre (Tante Zinia et l'ogre Kazoar)
12	12	"En avant la musique"	"Face the Music"	17 November 2004	En avant, la musique!
13	11	"Le premier bal d'Agaric"	"Periwinkle's First Dance"	10 November 2004	Periwinkle at the Full Moon Ball (Le premier bal d'Agaric Passiflore)
14	26	"Dentdelion et le bébé marmotte"	"Dandelion and the Baby Groundhog"	23 February 2005	Teleplay by Valérie Baranski
15	13	"La clé du bonheur"	"The Key to Happiness"	24 November 2004	Teleplay by Valérie Baranski
16	14	"Pirouette sous les feux de la rampe"	"In the Limelight"	1 December 2004	Teleplay by Valérie Baranski
17	15	"Coup de foudre aux Airelles"	"Love at First Sight"	8 December 2004	Teleplay by Valérie Baranski
18	22	"Au pays des fantômes"	"In Ghost Country"	26 January 2005	Teleplay by Valérie Baranski
19	21	"Dentdelion fait son cinéma"	"Dandelion and the Silver Screen"	19 January 2005	Teleplay by Valérie Baranski
20	23	"Agaric et le sorcier"	"Periwinkle and the Witch Doctor"	2 February 2005	Teleplay by Valérie Baranski
21	18	"Le pacte du lac"	"The Monster of Blueberry Lake"	29 December 2004	Teleplay by Valérie Baranski
22	16	"Le secret d'Onésime"	"Papa Bramble's Secret"	15 December 2004	Teleplay by Valérie Baranski
23	19	"Vive les vacances"	"Holiday with Love"	5 January 2005	Teleplay by Valérie Baranski
24	20	"Chez les petits savants"	"At the Science Academy"	12 January 2005	Teleplay by Valérie Baranski
25	24	"Au cœur de la source"	"The Heart of the Spring"	9 February 2005	Teleplay by Valérie Baranski
26	25	"Sacrée Nounou"	"Hairy Nanny"	16 February 2005	Teleplay by Valérie Baranski

=== Season 3 ===
Official #	TF1 #	French title	English title	Air date (France)	Original Beechwood Bunny Tale / Source material
27	27	"La fée Pirouette"	"Fairy Violet"	4 April 2007	Teleplay by Valérie Baranski
28	28	"Le lapin magique"	"Magic Rabbit"	18 April 2007	Teleplay by Valérie Baranski
29	29	"Un phare dans la forêt"	"Lighthouse in the Forest"	25 April 2007	Teleplay by Valérie Baranski
30	30	"La pêche au trésor"	"Treasure Hunt"	2 May 2007	Teleplay by Valérie Baranski
31	31	"Poussières d'étoiles"	"Stardust"	9 May 2007	Teleplay by Valérie Baranski
32	32	"Vacances de rêve"	"Dream Vacation"	23 May 2007	Teleplay by Valérie Baranski
33	33	"Les Passiflore et le Barapoul"	"The Bellflowers and the Henbar"	30 May 2007	Teleplay by Valérie Baranski
34	34	"Les Passiflore à la mer"	"Bellflowers by the Sea"	6 June 2007	Les Passiflore à la mer
35	35	"Parfum d'amour"	"Perfume of Love"	13 June 2007	Teleplay by Valérie Baranski
36	36	"Pirouette et la cigogne"	"Violet and the Stork"	20 June 2007	Teleplay by Valérie Baranski
37	38	"L'expédition glaciale"	"The Ice Expedition"	4 July 2007	Teleplay by Valérie Baranski
38	37	"Le violon du marais"	"The Violin in the Marsh"	27 June 2007	Teleplay by Valérie Baranski
39	39	"La reine des corsaires"	"Pirate Queen"	6 July 2008	Teleplay by Valérie Baranski
40	40	"Tempête aux Airelles"	"Storm over Blueberry Hill"	13 July 2008	Teleplay by Valérie Baranski
41	41	"Arsène et compagnie"	"Archie and Co"	20 July 2008	Teleplay by Valérie Baranski
42	42	"Les petits bricolos"	"Inventor Bunnies"	27 July 2008	Teleplay by Valérie Baranski
43	43	"Les Toudoux"	"The Softies"	17 August 2008	Teleplay by Valérie Baranski
44	44	"Les Passiflore unis"	"The Bellflowers United"	20 August 2008	Teleplay by Valérie Baranski
45	45	"Chez Zinia"	"At Zinnia's Place"	24 August 2008	Teleplay by Valérie Baranski
46	46	"Le Lapinosaurus"	"The Bunnyosaurus"	22 December 2008	Teleplay by Valérie Baranski
47	47	"L'élu des Airelles"	"The Chosen One"	23 December 2008	Teleplay by Valérie Baranski
48	48	"Roméo et Pirouette"	"Romeo and Violet"	30 December 2008	Teleplay by Valérie Baranski
49	49	"Sacré manège"	"Merry Go Round"	1 January 2009	Teleplay by Valérie Baranski
50	50	"Mon pantin à moi"	"My Rag Doll"	2 January 2009	Teleplay by Valérie Baranski
51	51	"Pierre de lune"	"Moonstone"	12 July 2010	Teleplay by Valérie Baranski
52	52	"Fabiola la douce"	"Sweet Fabiola"	13 July 2010	Teleplay by Valérie Baranski
