= The Bellflower Bunnies season 3 =

The Bellflower Bunnies
- Season 3
- The title card for seasons 2 and 3 as it appears in English. Characters from left to right: Poppy, Violet and Periwinkle.
- No. of episodes: 26

Release
- Original network: France TF1
- Original release: 4 April 2007 – 13 July 2010

Season chronology
- ← Previous; Season 2

The third and final season of The Bellflower Bunnies, a children's animated series based on the Beechwood Bunny Tales books by Geneviève Huriet and Loïc Jouannigot, began airing on France's TF1 network on 4 April 2007. The episodes are directed by Eric Berthier, produced by Patricia Robert, and written by Valérie Baranski.

This season consists of twenty-six episodes, During April and May 2008, all of them were first broadcast on Kinderkanal (KI.KA), a German children's station; episodes 27–38 first aired in France from April 4 to July 4, 2007, episodes 39–45 aired from July 6 to August 24, 2008, episodes 46–50 from December 22, 2008, to January 2, 2009, and episodes 51 and 52 on July 12 and July 13, 2010, respectively. In July and August 2008, most of those were broadcast on the French-language channel TFO in Ontario, Canada.

== Production ==
As with season 2, The Bellflower Bunnies is a co-production of France's TF1, Euro Visual, Big Cash and Walt Disney Television, and Canada's Tooncan. Newcomers to the series included the Département de la Charente, Région Poitou-Charentes, and Peter Scheede Animation of Saint-Yrieix-sur-Charente.

Production of this season began in 2005, and ended around early 2007. Returnees included director Eric Berthier, producer Patricia Robert, writer Valérie Baranski, executive co-producer Paul Cadieux, and executive producers Yves Pont and Franck Algard.

== Episodes ==
Each episode in this season runs 22 minutes in length. Except for "Les Passiflore à la mer" (based on an original Beechwood Bunny Tale), the episodes are based on original scripts by Valérie Baranski. The English titles for this season's episodes come from broadcasts on other countries, such as TVP1 in Poland and Boomerang in Latin America/Brazil.

The 38th episode in the official order, "Le violon du marais," aired in France before #37, "L'expédition glaciale." On KI.KA's list, however, "La reine des corsaires" ("Das Geheimnis von Schloss Meadow") comes at No. 37, while "L'expédition glaciale" is placed at No. 39 instead.

Official no. (Note: O = Corresponds to the official order as listed by Institut National de l'Audiovisuel (INA) and AnimezVous.com.)	Broadcast no. (Note: B = Corresponds to TF1's broadcast schedule.)	French title English title	Air date in France	Air date in Germany
27–1	27–1	"Fairy Violet" "La fée Pirouette"	4 April 2007	
Violette is granted the powers of a fairy from Aunt Zinnia's childhood book.
28–2	28–2	"Magic rabbit" "Le lapin magique"	18 April 2007	
Due to a series of stressful issues, the Elder Bellflower Siblings investigate the cause of their problems, while Periwinkle and Dandelion were trying to take refuge in a neighbouring settlement after seeing and mistakening someone for a divine magical white rabbit last night.
29–3	29–3	"Lighthouse in the Forest" "Un phare dans la forêt"	25 April 2007	
Periwinkle takes care of an injured bird from the forest, but it ends up dead in illness the following morning. After Papa Bramble tells him what happened, the young rabbit boy goes on an adventure in search of the spirit of deceased friend with help from a teenage squirrel named Acorn.
30–4	30–4	"Treasure Hunt" "La pêche au trésor"	2 May 2007	
To meet a greedy and desperate badger crime lord's demands, Poppy must build a machine to lift out a sacred treasure from a lake.
31–5	31–5	"Stardust" "Poussières d'étoiles"	9 May 2007	
A meteorite strikes Beechwood Grove, then causes problems for Periwinkle's family and the community after it is stolen.
32–6	32–6	"Dream Vacation" "Vacances de rêve"	23 May 2007	
Mistletoe feels reluctant about his house duties, and decides to travel with Violette and Gamba on a trip to a festive event at Blueberry Meadows, but eventually learns that there is no holiday from chores after an incident with the carriage kart.
33–7	33–7	"The Bellflowers and the Henbar" "Les Passiflore et le Barapoul"	30 May 2007	
The Bellflowers receive a visit from the Barapoul Henbar, a trio of musical hen shamans.
34–8	34–8	"Bellflowers by the Sea" "Les Passiflore à la mer"	6 June 2007	
Bramble takes his family to the seaside, where the children take sailing lessons and help a friend. Later, their day is ruined when Dandelion gets caught in an incident at the smugglers' trap cavern caused by Cat Gangsters. Based on Les Passiflore à la mer (ISBN 2-7459-1788-9).
35–9	35–9	"Perfume of love" "Parfum d'amour"	13 June 2007	
A love fragrance makes Periwinkle attracted to the perfumer's granddaughter, Clara, and his neighbour and friend Pimpernelle, at the same time. Now he must make a tough decision over whom he truly loves. But in the end, he chose Pimpernelle as the one he loves.
36–10	36–10	"Violette and the Stork" "Pirouette et la cigogne"	20 June 2007	
The family looks after a red-eyed white rabbit when a female stork with poor eyesight delivered it to them by mistake. As a result, it created a problem with the civilians of Blueberry Hill, and Violette must do something about it.
37 - 11	38–12	"The Ice Expedition" "L'expédition glaciale"	4 July 2007	
On his birthday, Poppy goes on an expedition to the world's largest glacier in Europe. During the expedition, Periwinkle get looked after by a bear woman named Yuira, while the Bellflower Siblings get stuck in a cave with Ollie, Yuira's son.
38–12	37–11	"The Violin in the Marsh" "Le violon du marais"	27 June 2007	
The rabbit siblings and their father Bramble are delighted at Poppy's performance on a violin he bought from a flea market; Mistletoe arrogantly wants to prove he can play it better than his brother. But when the instrument is broken by accident, it will lead both on a dangerous quest through a marsh to find its maker, Luccio.
39–13	39–13	"Pirate Queen" "La reine des corsaires"	6 July 2008	7 May 2008
When a crazy parrot pirate whose ancestors have been robbed of their treasure, Anthony from Scottish County gives the Bellflower Siblings a hand once again to find out the truth behind the mystery between his bloodline and the parrot pirates.
40–14	40–14	"Storm over Blueberry Hill" "Tempête aux Airelles"	13 July 2008	12 May 2008
Poppy and Mistletoe were thrilled at the newest flying machine around, owned by a rooster man named Gilbert, but Bramble forbids his children from going on it due to bad weather.
41–15	41–15	"Archie & CO" "Arsène et compagnie"	20 July 2008	13 May 2008
Dandelion wanders away from the house during stormy weather, and is then saved by a young crow boy named Archie who is from an estrange crow family. However, Dandelion's family have suspicions that the crows could be thieves.
42–16	42–16	"Inventor Bunnies" "Les petits bricolos"	27 July 2008	14 May 2008
Papa Bramble's old friend, an inventor named Agathe, pays a visit to the family with her tomboy daughter Lilli who is a gifted inventor. Poppy becomes filled with jealously and hatred upon seeing her skills and talents. However, a rabbit gangster named Oscar kidnaps both Poppy and Lilli and ties them up, and had them held for ransom. Poppy and Lilli must put aside their differences in order to escape.
43–17	43–17	"The Softies" "Les Toudoux"	17 August 2008	15 May 2008
During an intense heat wave in Theo Bellflower's hometown, Periwinkle, Dandelion and his father Bramble visit an underground stream. While there, they come across the cursed belt buckle of Baldini, the legendary Knight. Periwinkle and Dandelion along with their older siblings come across some Angora Rabbits while trying to solve the mystery of Baldini's origins and armor, with help from the Angora Rabbit siblings Frisky and Gaius.
44–18	44–18	"The Bellflowers United" "Les Passiflore unis"	20 August 2008	16 May 2008
During a rough winter, Bramble was planning to get Violette a new dress. But during that time, a badger scam artist and crook named Howard Gruffman offers Violette a new dress, but in truth the dress Violette got belongs to Pimpernelle, and upon getting the dress, Howard and the magpie Magda stole some stuff from Bramble's garage. Now the Bellflower Siblings must work together to get the stuff back.
45–19	45–19	"At Zinna's Place" "Chez Zinia"	24 August 2008	19 May 2008
A car accident lands a restaurant critic close to the Bellflower home; impressed by Aunt Zinnia's cooking skills, he persuades the rabbits to open their own establishment. Though hoping to help his family out, Periwinkle gets left behind with some rats who eventually blackmail and force him to make their meals.
46–20	46–20	"The Bunnyosaurus" "Le Lapinosaurus"	22 December 2008	20 May 2008
While the young rabbits spend another winter at Theo's, Poppy discovers a dinosaur fossil and informs Ernest Babine about it; a well-preserved specimen soon awaits both of them.
47–21	47–21	"The Chosen One" "L'élu des Airelles"	23 December 2008	21 May 2008
The Bellflower Siblings get involved into a spiritual election to decide which of them will be chosen by the two partridges to become prince of their home, the Land of the Yellow Sun.
48–22	48–22	"Romeo and Violette" "Roméo et Pirouette"	30 December 2008	22 May 2008
Poppy and Mistletoe become rivals with Romeo, a race car driver; even Violette falls in love with him. However, the brothers suspect that he could be a fraud, but their suscipions created a problem with Violette's relationship with Romeo.
49–23	49–23	"Merry-Go-Round" "Sacré manège"	1 January 2009	23 May 2008
The young rabbit siblings try out an old carousel machine. But when they accidentally break it down, it landed them into trouble with its owner. Poppy and Periwinkle have to find the owner's brother to help them fix the carousel in time for the carnival.
50–24	50–24	"My Rag Doll" "Mon pantin à moi"	2 January 2009	26 May 2008
Due to his older siblings feeling he is too small to qualify for the festival competition, Dandelion suddenly strays away from the family and that results in him being in depression, and the elder siblings have to make things right.
51–25	51–25	"Moonstone" "Pierre de lune"	14 January 2009 (Playhouse Disney); 12 July 2010 (TF1)	27 May 2008
In order to impress his girlfriend Pammy, Poppy builds a moon-ready rocket. But upon her return, her new stepbrother Norbert puts Poppy in a very foul mood, which created problems between Poppy and Pammy. After a failed attempt into going to the moon, Bramble advises Poppy to do the right thing by reconciling with Pammy and Norbert.
52–26	52–26	"Sweet Fabiola" "Fabiola la douce"	15 January 2009 (Playhouse Disney); 13 July 2010 (TF1)	28 May 2008
Violette goes for the main role in a stage production, but then her costume gets stolen. Eventually, as she searches for it, she ends up in the cave of an evil sorceress and her thugs.

== DVD releases ==
Beez Entertainment and Seven Sept released the first DVD of this season on 4 November 2008, as La Famille Passiflore: Les Nouvelles Aventures. Like the second season discs, the original French versions are paired with their English dubs. Another volume was released on January 6, 2009., the two DVDs include five episodes each. No new volumes of this season have been released since then.

== See also ==
- List of The Bellflower Bunnies episodes
