= Violette's Daring Adventure =

Sixth book in the Beechwood Bunny Tales series by Geneviève Huriet

- Author: Geneviève Huriet
- Original title: 'Le défi de Pirouette Passiflore'
- Translator: (in English) Amy Bauman (in German) Heike Rahm (under title Lilli Langohr geht aufs Ganze) (in Korean) Chong-in Kim (under title Yŏu rŭl mannan Paenggŭri [여우를만난뱅글이])
- Illustrator: Loïc Jouannigot
- Cover artist: Loïc Jouannigot
- Language: French
- Series: Beechwood Bunny Tales (La Famille Passiflore)
- Genre: Children's fiction
- Publisher: Éditions Milan; Gareth Stevens; Delphin Verlag (1992); Donga Chulpansa (1993)
- Publication date: March 1991
- Publication place: France
- English publication date: December 1992
- Media type: Hardcover
- Pages: 30
- ISBN: 2-86726-679-3
- OCLC: 26803767
- Preceded by: Aunt Zinnia and the Ogre (1990)
- Followed by: Family Moving Day (1992)

Violette's Daring Adventure (French: Le défi de Pirouette Passiflore) is the sixth book in the Beechwood Bunny Tales series. It was originally published by France's Éditions Milan in 1991, and in the United States by Gareth Stevens a year later. The book was awarded the Soleils d'Or at 1991's BD Festival.

In the book, Violette Bellflower and her brother Periwinkle leave their Beechwood Grove home and decide to play at a faraway pond, although their family thinks it is too dangerous. There, they meet a boy in strange clothes who plays an enticing harmonica tune, and tricks them into being invited for cookies.

Periwinkle jigs into joy after hearing this, but Violette informs him that the boy, Jimmy Renard, is actually a fox. She tells him that they should escape into the Big Passage, a secret complex tunnel that Beechwood's residents use for emergencies. But several of Renard's henchmen stop the bunnies' plan, and catch Periwinkle for their own dinner.

Hearing this, Violette feels that her cleverness has failed, and at the foxes' burrow, she rescues her brother in an instant and heads into the Passage. The enemies go after the rabbits, only to be stopped by the collapse of stones Violette and Periwinkle shower on top of them.

Both bunnies reach home safely, and tell Papa Bramble what happened. He feels angry, yet sees how brave they have been. Eventually, the two siblings snooze off at the dinner table, and soon have nightmares about their adventure. After Bramble reminds them what they went through, he goes off to sleep, saying: "It seems the children haven't told me the entire story."

== See also ==
- Periwinkle at the Full Moon Ball, the first Beechwood Bunny Tale.
