= Family Moving Day =

1992 book by Éditions Milan

- The book's original French cover
- Author: Geneviève Huriet
- Original title: La famille Passiflore déménage
- Translator: Patricia Lantier-Sampon (in Korean) Chong-in Kim
- Illustrator: Loïc Jouannigot
- Cover artist: Loïc Jouannigot
- Language: French
- Series: Beechwood Bunny Tales (La Famille Passiflore)
- Genre: Children's fiction
- Publisher: Éditions Milan; Gareth Stevens; Tonga Chulpansa (1993)
- Publication date: 9 September 1992
- Publication place: France
- English publication date: December 1992
- Media type: Hardcover
- Pages: 30
- ISBN: 2-86726-777-3
- OCLC: 26723859
- Preceded by: Violette's Daring Adventure (1991)
- Followed by: Les beignets flambés (1995) (Note: The Grands livres, special-edition books in the original French series (of which eight have been published), are not regular titles, but mostly collections of previous stories. The first two such installments were published in 1992 and 1994 respectively; Beignets, a regular title, followed shortly after.)

Family Moving Day (French: La famille Passiflore déménage) is the seventh book in the Beechwood Bunny Tales series. It was published in 1992 by Éditions Milan in France, and Gareth Stevens in the United States. In the book, the Bellflower family of rabbits move to a new house on the other side of the hill near which they live. Everyone is delighted to go, except Periwinkle, who does not easily adapt to new settings. In response, he runs away, and it is up to his father Bramble to find him.

As of 2008, this is the last book in the Beechwood franchise to have an English translation available. However, the original French series is still being published, with over 30 titles to date. Versions of Family Moving Day have also been published in Korean and Slovene. An animated version appeared in December 2001 on France's TF1 network, as one of the first episodes of The Bellflower Bunnies series.

== Story ==
Because there is so little room at the home where they live, Bramble Bellflower (French: Onésime Passiflore) decides that he and his family should move. He does not announce the plan until later, when the seven members come over to the other side of the hill and look at their new property. They do not know that Bramble has actually bought and remodelled the house, which is called The Berries. It will be eight days before the family settles in their new spot. But Periwinkle, one of Bramble's five children, is deeply affected by the change of address; he is afraid he will miss his neighbour, Pimpernelle, and his old home, in the process. He finds his new room, which he will share with brother Dandelion, too large for his liking.

Papa Bramble (right) tells Periwinkle about the Bellflowers' old house.

Next day, Mistletoe, another young Bellflower, insists that the house's fixing up be finished. He calls on his four siblings for the task, and they secretly set off to do it. However, when Papa enters to get a lost tool, he is dismayed at the mess they have made. Angrily, he and Aunt Zinnia send them back home, and the father cleans up after them.

Soon, he announces that two strapping rams will carry the family's furniture in carts; the Pedal Express will be involved as well. When the day comes, Bramble, Mistletoe, Poppy and the Bellflowers' neighbours help out on the goods, while Zinnia and the other children wait for them at The Berries. By afternoon, everything is in place, but the bunnies find out that Periwinkle is nowhere in sight. Instead, the lonely child has set up a small canvas tent near the old home, close to a hazelnut grove.

Knowing where Periwinkle possibly could be, Papa searches for him and eventually comes across the tent. Inside, he reminds his son that no one lives at the old Bellflower home any more. But, when Papa tells him of a housewarming at their new place, Periwinkle cheers up, and the two of them head back over the hill to join in the fun.

== Translations ==
Amy Bauman's English translation, published by Gareth Stevens in December 1992, is the last Beechwood Bunny Tale to have a North American edition. In South Korea, Chong-in Kim's translation is known as Sant'okki kajok ŭi isa (산토끼가족의이사). In 1997, Maribor's Obzorja published a Slovene version by Janko Moder, under the title of Robidovi se selijo.

== Television episode ==
In 2001, Family Moving Day was adapted into the first official (and second aired) episode of TF1's animated series The Bellflower Bunnies, entitled "Le déménagement" in France, "Ein neues Zuhause" in Germany, and "Room to Move" in English. The series actually debuted with "Slide On", the third in the official show sequence.

As part of a marketing deal with one of the show's producers, TVA International, the Utah-based Feature Films for Families released the first English-language volume of the series in 2001 (on VHS), and again on 1 October 2003 (on Region 1 DVD). This contains the first two official episodes, "Room to Move" and "Carnival". They were further paired with "Vive la glisse" and "En ballon" in TF1's French version (also from 2003), and Edelkids' German-dubbed version, released on 22 February 2008.

This animated version stays faithful to the book, except for a few alterations, one of which involves Magda the magpie and her "Blueberry Ghost" trick to scare the Bellflowers out of their new home. In addition, the young bunnies perform an up-tempo jazz-flavoured song called "Bunnies on the Move", written by Valérie Baranski and Daniel Scott.

== See also ==
- Two other Beechwood Bunny Tales, Periwinkle at the Full Moon Ball and Violette's Daring Adventure.
