= Love at First Sight =

Love at First Sight may refer to:

- Love at first sight, a personal experience and a literary trope

== Film and television ==
=== Film ===
- Love at First Sight (1929 film), an American musical comedy film
- Love at First Sight (1932 film), a German comedy film
- Love at First Sight (1976 film), a Canadian romantic comedy film
- Love at First Sight (1977 film), a Georgian/Soviet comedy film
- Love at First Sight (1985 film), an Italian comedy film
- Love at First Sight (2000 film) or Sausalito, a Hong Kong film
- Love at First Sight (2011 film), a British short film
- Love at First Sight, a 2017 short film included in the home release of Sing
- Love at First Sight (2023 film), an American romantic comedy film

=== Television ===
- Love at First Sight, a short-lived British dating game show, hosted by Bruno Brookes, that aired on Sky One from 1990 until 1992
- Love at First Sight, a short-lived American adaptation of the equally short-lived British dating game show of the same name, hosted by Jeff MacGregor, that aired in syndication in 1992
- "Love at First Sight", a 1980 episode of The Adventures of Tom Sawyer
- "Love at First Sight", a 1993 episode of Red Shoe Diaries
- "Love at First Sight" (The Bellflower Bunnies), a 2004 episode
- "Love at First Sight", a 2018 episode of Karenjit Kaur – The Untold Story of Sunny Leone

== Music ==
=== Albums ===
- Love at First Sight (Dionne Warwick album), 1977
- Love at First Sight (Sonny Rollins album), 1980

=== Songs ===
- "Love at First Sight" (Kylie Minogue song), 2002 (for the 1988 song, see below)
- "Love at First Sight" (Styx song), 1991
- "Love @ 1st Sight", by Mary J. Blige, 2003
- "Je t'aime... moi non plus", written by Serge Gainsbourg, 1967; covered by several performers as "Love at First Sight"
- "Love at First Sight", by Amanda Lear from I Don't Like Disco, 2012
- "Love at First Sight", by the Brobecks from Violent Things, 2009
- "Love at First Sight", by Carmela Marner and Nick Curtis from the film Puss in Boots, 1988
- "Love at First Sight", by Cherie Currie from Beauty's Only Skin Deep, 1978
- "Love at First Sight", by Emerson, Lake & Palmer from Love Beach, 1978
- "Love at First Sight", by Fairport Convention from Myths and Heroes, 2015
- "Love at First Sight", by Kylie Minogue from Kylie, 1988
- "Love at First Sight", by Michael Bublé from Totally Bublé, 2003
- "Love at First Sight", by Prudence Liew from Loving Prince, 1988
- "Love at First Sight", by Roddy Jackson, 1958
- "Love at First Sight", by Spagna, 1991
- "Love at First Sight", by Super Junior-T from Devil, 2015
- "Love at First Sight", by XTC from Black Sea, 1980

== Other uses ==
- Love at First Sight (play), a 1704 play by David Crauford
- Love at First Sight, an 1846 Pre-Raphaelite painting by William Holman Hunt
- Love at First Sight, a 1949–1956 romance comic published by Ace Magazines
- "Love at First Sight", a poem by Wisława Szymborska

== See also ==
- Amor a primera vista (lit. Love at first sight), a 1956 Argentine film
- Entre Nous (film) or Coup de foudre, a 1983 French film
- Le Coup de Foudre, a 2019 Chinese streaming television series
- Pehli Nazar Ka Pyaar (lit. 'Love of First Sight'), a 2008 Indian film
- Love at First Bite, a 1979 horror comedy film
- Love at First Byte (disambiguation)
- "Love at First Light", a 2012 song by Olivia Ong and Natanya Tan
