= Lulu's Islands =

French children's television series

- Genre: Animated children's series
- Created by: Nathalie Dargent; Denis Cauquetoux
- Written by: Valérie Baranski; Nathalie Dargent
- Directed by: Denis Berthier; Eric Berthier (pilot)
- Starring: English version: Harriet Carmichael
- Composer: Pierre Gillet
- Country of origin: France
- No. of episodes: 52

Production
- Producer: Patricia Robert
- Running time: 13 min.
- Production companies: Patoon-Animation; IP4U; CCRAV; TF1

Original release
- Network: TF1
- Release: 5 October – 25 November 2009

Lulu's Islands (French: Les Mistigris, originally Lulu la Peste) is an animated children's series that premiered on 5 October 2009, on the TFOU block of France's TF1 network. It is produced by Interactive Project 4 You (IP4U) of Valenciennes and Patoon-Animation of Paris. The show uses cutout animation for its style, and is targeted to young viewers.

== Synopsis ==
Animals of various species live happily on an untouched archipelago called the Wonderlees. One day, everything changes when a kitten named Lulu meets the first human ever to land on their shores: Peppy (or Pépin), a young shipwreck survivor turned castaway.

== Characters ==
- Lulu, a mischievous tomboy cat, and the show's heroine
- Romeo, a baby elephant
- Erik (Eric), a maned wolf cub
- Simone, a French bulldog
- Isabelle, a giraffe, and the teacher of the children
- Peppy (Pépin), the boy who gets stranded on the Wonderlees

== Cast ==
- Lizzie Waterworth - Peppy
- Jules de Jongh - Lulu and Erik
- Joanna Ruiz - Romeo and Simone
- Harriet Carmichael - Pipa and Isabelle
- Eric Meyers - Daddycat, Badjijaba, Bartolo
- Fabrice Ziolkowski - Dr. Button

== Production ==
Lulu's Islands began development at Paris' HLC Productions in 2005 under the title Lulu la Peste, at a cost of €137,000. By 2008, the budget had grown to €2,931,000.

Production of the new series involves at least three crew members of another TF1 animated series, The Bellflower Bunnies: Eric Berthier, the director of Bellflower's 2nd and 3rd seasons; screenwriter Valérie Baranski; and producer Patricia Robert, who in March 2008 set up Patoon-Animation exclusively for the new show. Pierre Gillet, from the Belgian music and post-production outlet Dame Blanche, will serve as composer.

== Episodes ==
Lulu's Islands consists of a planned 52 episodes, in addition to a four-minute pilot that was shown as an official selection at the Annecy International Animation Festival in June 2008.

No.	Title	Original release date
1	"The Night of the Flowerpuffs"	TBA
2	"A Friend for Life"	TBA
3	"A Day in Paradise"	TBA
4	"The Black Queen"	TBA
5	"Rustic"	TBA
6	"Cool Vacation"	TBA
7	"The Snows of the Jiro Jiro"	TBA
8	"The Great Pinchnose"	TBA
9	"The Booh Party"	TBA
10	"Bottles at Sea"	TBA
11	"The Grump"	TBA
12	"Peppy and the Baby Shoots"	TBA
13	"Funny Mermaid"	TBA
14	"Spring Cleaning at Punta Tortuga"	TBA
15	"Peppy is Gone"	TBA
16	"The Boat Home"	TBA
17	"The Night of the Jellyfish"	TBA
18	"The Magic Butterfly Part 1"	TBA
19	"The Magic Butterfly Part 2"	TBA
20	"The Magic Galleon"	TBA
21	"The Poof-Poofs"	TBA
22	"Tell It To The Wind!"	TBA
23	"Singing Fools"	TBA
24	"Peppy the Great Migrator"	TBA
25	"The Algoraptor"	TBA
26	"The King of the Fruit Juices"	TBA
27	"An Island For Everyone"	TBA
28	"The Floating Island"	TBA
29	"Peppy's Cat"	TBA
30	"The Spring Hunter"	TBA
31	"Wonderlee Music Festival"	TBA
32	"Peppy And The Mask Of Shawanga"	TBA
33	"The Big Regatta"	TBA
34	"The Feather Face"	TBA
35	"The Treasure Of Captain Brickly"	TBA
36	"Titania"	TBA
37	"My Best Friend Is A Girl"	TBA
38	"Where Have All The Seasons Gone?"	TBA
39	"Cry Wolf"	TBA
40	"The Jacuzzi Story"	TBA
41	"The Ink Spill"	TBA
42	"Atlant Island"	TBA
43	"Peppy Takes The Train"	TBA
44	"The Perfume Artist"	TBA
45	"The Haka"	TBA
46	"Peppy And The Dinosports"	TBA
47	"The Flight Of The Pumpkinplane"	TBA
48	"Hello, Wonderlees"	TBA
49	"Peppy Glows Up"	TBA
50	"A Nutty Story"	TBA
51	"The Makigaya"	TBA
52	"A Gift From Heaven"	TBA

== Merchandise ==
There will also be tie-in books based on the series, although further details have not been announced since early 2008.
