= La Famille Passiflore =

In French, La Famille Passiflore can refer to:

- Beechwood Bunny Tales, a series of children's books by Geneviève Huriet, Amélie Sarn and Loïc Jouannigot
- The Bellflower Bunnies, a TF1 animated series based on these books.
