= The Mysteries of Providence =

French television series

- Created by: Patrick Schwerdtle; Olivier Marvaud; Fabrice Ziolkowski
- Written by: Olivier Marvaud; Patrick Schwerdtle; Elisabeth Very; Sebastien Viaud; Fabrice Ziolkowski
- Directed by: Eric Berthier
- Composer: Alice Willis
- Countries of origin: France; Hong Kong; Luxembourg
- Original language: French
- No. of episodes: 26

Production
- Executive producer: Patricia Robert
- Running time: 23 minutes
- Production companies: Protécréa; Banco Production; Animation Entreprises; Hong Kong Ltd. Mélusine Productions

Original release
- Network: TF1; ABC
- Release: January 12 – July 6, 2002

The Mysteries of Providence is a French-Hong Kong-Luxembourgish animated television series produced by Protécréa, Banco Productions, Animation Entreprises (Hong Kong) Ltd. and Mélusine Productions, it is first shown on TF1's TFOU television program on January 12, 2002. The series is about the adventures of Oscar, a private detective who tries to uncover the secret of Providence alongside his friends the energetic Kate and the inventor Martin.

== Plot ==
Before the birth of ice and fire, and many, many years before the existence of the first tribes, seven wise men buried a treasure in an enchanted land, to keep it away from evil forces. Today that treasure is in danger, and the only one who can protect it is the one who reads the parchment and confronts the evil powers, to uncover the secret of Providence.

== Characters ==
- Oscar (voiced by Eric Meyers in the English version), who was a sea-captain in his youth, works as a private detective and is recognized from the fact that he wears a red bowler hat and a green suit every day. He is an accurate, polite, smart pig, who even notices a hair amiss. Formerly he travelled the world; he saw a lot of things, so it is not very easy to fool him. Because of this, he does his job very well. Oscar is the one who reads the parchment and is therefore chosen by the Seventh Wise Man to protect and uncover the secret of Providence.
- Martin (voiced by Ben Small in the English version) is an eccentric inventor, who uses his strange inventions to help Oscar and Kate to uncover the secret of Providence. If they need an airplane, he will pilot it, if they need an underwater vehicle, he will build it, if they need to record a video secretly, he will slap together the mini-camera. Martin is Oscar's childhood friend alongside Kate and tries to help them uncover the secret of Providence using his intellect. However, he is also a coward and prefers to stay away from trouble and direct confrontation with the series' villains as best as he can.
- Kate (voiced by Jules de Jongh in the English version) is a beautiful, cool, spirited, clever vixen and the only one of the three who does not believe in the secret of Providence. She is sceptical about this whole mess, but she still helps her friends to uncover the secret of Providence. Kate believes that all of the supernatural creatures appearing in Providence are in fact insane villains dressed in costumes and all the supernatural things going on in Providence are in fact made up stories, despite the fact that she along with Oscar and Martin has faced supernatural creatures many times.
- The Seventh Wise Man is the only surviving member of the seven wise men who buried the treasure in an enchanted land to keep it away from evil forces. He chooses Oscar and his friends to be the new protector of the treasure once he reads the parchment, but he first must test them to see if they are indeed worthy and capable of protecting it. He is behind all of the strange phenomena that are happening in Providence and all the strange creatures that are appearing. He is millions of years old and has strange magical abilities. He dies in the final episode after giving the heroes three magical staffs containing all of his magical powers to fight Auguste Gagliari.
- The Griffin is an ancient mystical creature who takes possession of the body of Stanley the librarian with the help of the Seventh Wise Man, and asks questions from the citizens of Providence. If they fail to answer his questions then the Griffin sends them inside the various books in Stanley's library. They remain there until Oscar frees them and Stanley by answering all of the Griffin's questions correctly as well as receiving an item that will help him uncover the secret of Providence in the final episode.
- Auguste Gagliari is an evil wizard who belongs to a secret organization of men who want the power of the secret of Providence, so that they can rule the world. Not much is explained about this organization or Auguste himself, but it is revealed that they have been looking for the treasure for years. He appears in the final episode and must fight Oscar and his friends to get the treasure. He transforms into a demon to go after Oscar and creates two clones of himself to go after Kate and Martin. He is defeated by the heroes and his body turns into dust.
- Citizens of Providence: Because Providence is not always that charming little place that it appears at first glance it is revealed that its residents are up to no good, for example they form allies with the dark world, they steal a golden statue worth millions, or they enrage the Griffin and later become the prisoners of the Griffin. But does the Griffin really exist, and if it does, how can one escape from its claws? One thing is for sure, the Seventh Wise Man uses the dark side of Providence's citizens to test the three heroes in various ways.

== Episodes ==
No.	Title	Original release date
1	"The Lake Monster"	12 January 2002
2	"The Black Hawk"	19 January 2002
3	"Beautiful for a Day"	26 January 2002
4	"Emergency"	2 February 2002
5	"Twig-friend"	9 February 2002
6	"The Incredible Mr. Pips"	16 February 2002
7	"The Day Time Stood Still"	23 February 2002
8	"Dolly Doll"	2 March 2002
9	"The Freak Fair"	9 March 2002
10	"The Story of Gawain"	16 March 2002
11	"The Thief of Glory"	23 March 2002
12	"The Duke of Bombay"	30 March 2002
13	"Rough Weather"	6 April 2002
14	"The Mouth of Quetzacoatl"	13 April 2002
15	"The Eyes Has It"	20 April 2002
16	"A Rose for Theo"	27 April 2002
17	"The Curse of Adrenaline"	4 May 2002
18	"Bad Thoughts"	11 May 2002
19	"The Vampire Symphony"	18 May 2002
20	"Don Karlito's Big Lie"	25 May 2002
21	"The Automatic Man"	1 June 2002
22	"The Demon Mine"	8 June 2002
23	"Prisoners of the Griffin"	15 June 2002
24	"The Electric Avenger"	22 June 2002
25	"Circle of Evil"	29 June 2002
26	"The Last Secret"	6 July 2002
