= Room to Move (disambiguation) =

"Room to Move" is a 1987 song performed by Climie Fisher and Animotion.

Room to Move may also refer to:

- "Room to Move", song by John Mayall from The Turning Point album
- "Room to Move", episode of the Australian TV series Winners, directed by John Duigan and spun off into a 1987 movie adaptation
- "Room to Move", 2001 episode of The Bellflower Bunnies based on Family Moving Day
