= Periwinkle at the Full Moon Ball =

1987 book by Geneviève Huriet

- Author: Geneviève Huriet
- Original title: Le premier bal d'Agaric Passiflore
- Translator: (In English) MaryLee Knowlton (In Portuguese) Ana Maria Ferreira (under title O primeiro baile de Agarico)
- Illustrator: Loïc Jouannigot
- Cover artist: Loïc Jouannigot
- Language: French
- Series: Beechwood Bunny Tales (La Famille Passiflore)
- Genre: Children's fiction
- Publisher: Éditions Milan; United States: Gareth Stevens; Portugal: Minutos de Leitura (2002)
- Publication date: 1987
- Publication place: France
- English publication date: February 1991
- Media type: Hardcover
- Pages: 30
- ISBN: 2-86726-189-9
- OCLC: 22450325
- Followed by: Dandelion's Vanishing Vegetable Garden (1988)

Periwinkle at the Full Moon Ball (French: Le premier bal d'Agaric Passiflore) is the first book in the Beechwood Bunny Tales series. It was originally published by France's Éditions Milan in 1987, and in the United States by Gareth Stevens in 1991. In its native country, the book won the Prix Saint-Exupéry for 1988, and the Prix de la Ville de Paris for its author.

== Story ==
A young rabbit named Periwinkle Bellflower ("Agaric Passiflore" in the French version) learns of the summertime Full Moon Ball that will soon take place in the community of Beechwood Grove. Unlike the other rabbits in his family, he cannot dance, and this makes him sad. But, with the help of a conniving magpie, Magda, and a wood pigeon and a frog as his teachers, he soon learns how to do so in a couple of days.

On the night of the Ball, Periwinkle takes centre stage with his moves, unaware of Madga's plan: the whole of Beechwood is supposed to laugh at him in embarrassment. However, a white owl in the audience exposes the magpie's trick. Recognising his steps, she asks Periwinkle to dance them again, much to the joy of his family and the other rabbits. He continues until dawn, when the Bellflowers return home.

== TV episode ==
On November 10, 2004, France's TF1 network aired an adaptation of the book, entitled "Periwinkle's First Dance" in English. It was the 13th official (and 11th broadcast) episode of its animated series, The Bellflower Bunnies.

Beez Entertainment and Seven Sept released it on DVD in March 2005, on the third volume of this show's second season.
