= The Secret of Kells =

Fantasy drama animation film (2009)

- Theatrical release poster
- Directed by: Tomm Moore; Nora Twomey
- Screenplay by: Fabrice Ziolkowski
- Story by: Tomm Moore
- Produced by: Paul Young; Didier Brunner; Viviane Vanfleteren
- Starring: Evan McGuire; Brendan Gleeson; Christen Mooney; Mick Lally; Michael McGrath; Liam Hourican; Paul Tylak; Paul Young
- Edited by: Fabienne Alvarez-Giro
- Music by: Bruno Coulais; Kíla
- Production companies: Les Armateurs; Vivi Film; Cartoon Saloon; France 2 Cinéma
- Distributed by: Gébéka Films (France); Kinepolis Film Distribution (Belgium); Buena Vista International (Ireland); Celluloid Dreams (International)
- Release dates: 30 January 2009 (Gérardmer Film Festival); 11 February 2009 (France/Belgium); 3 March 2009 (Ireland)
- Running time: 79 minutes
- Countries: Ireland; France; Belgium
- Language: English
- Budget: US$8 million
- Box office: US$3.5 million

The Secret of Kells is a 2009 animated epic fantasy film directed by Tomm Moore and Nora Twomey, produced by Paul Young, Didier Brunner and Viviane Vanfleteren, and written by Fabrice Ziolkowski. An Irish-French-Belgian co-production, led by the animation studio Cartoon Saloon, the film is about the making of the Book of Kells, an illuminated manuscript from the 9th century. It stars Evan McGuire, Brendan Gleeson, Christen Mooney, Mick Lally (in his final film role), Michael McGrath, Liam Hourican, Paul Tylak and Paul Young.

The Secret of Kells premiered on 8 February 2009 at the 59th Berlin International Film Festival. It went into wide release in Belgium and France on 11 February, and Ireland on 3 March. It was distributed by Gébéka Films in France, Kinepolis Film Distribution in Belgium and Buena Vista International in Ireland. The film received widespread critical acclaim and was nominated for the Academy Award for Best Animated Feature, but lost to Pixar's Up. The film is the first installment in Moore's "Irish Folklore Trilogy", preceding the films Song of the Sea (2014) and Wolfwalkers (2020). All three were nominated for the Academy Award for Best Animated Feature.

== Plot ==
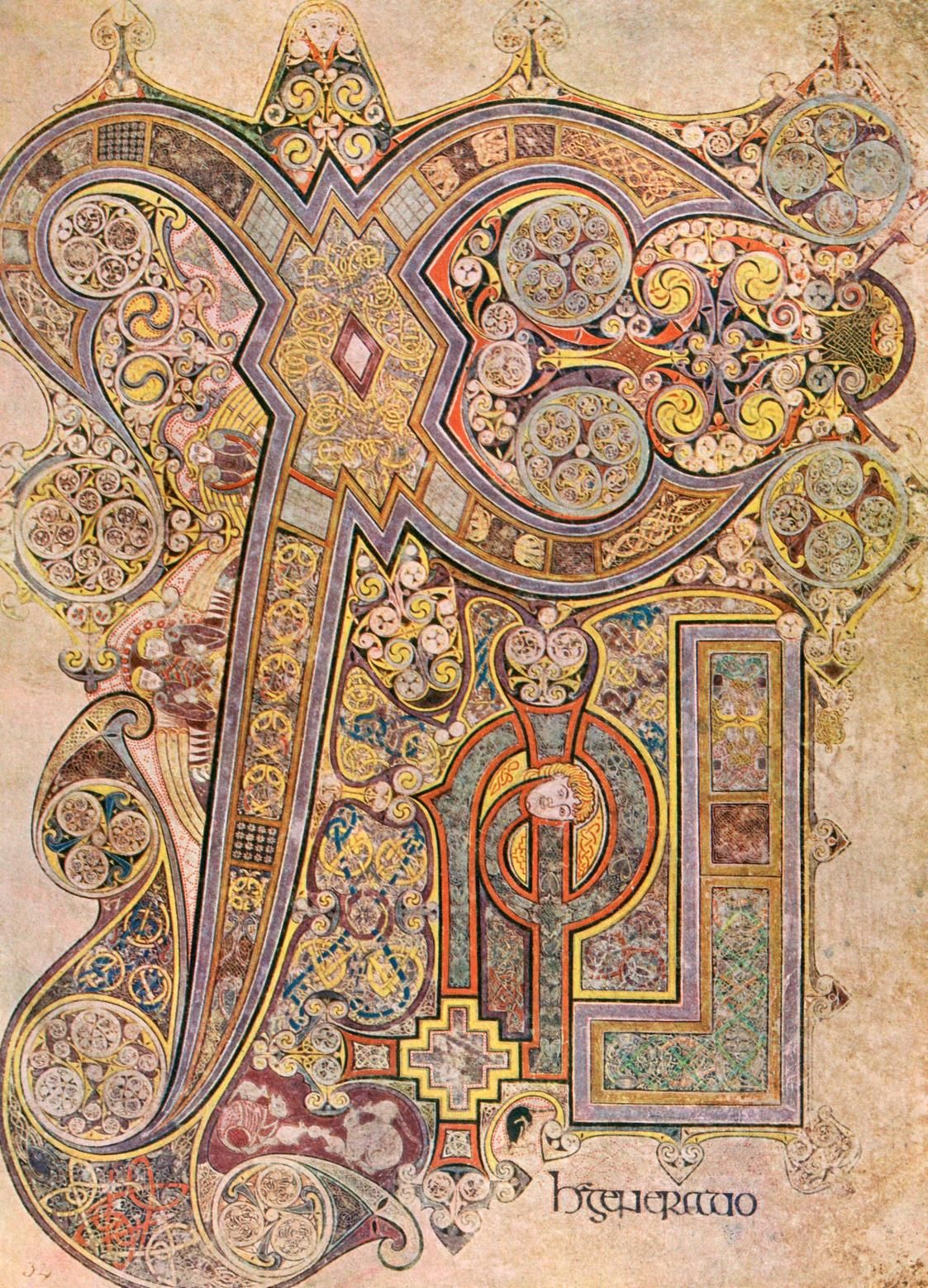
Folio 34r of the original Book of Kells shows the Chi Rho monogram.

In early 9th-century Ireland, 12-year-old Brendan lives in the Abbey of Kells, where his uncle Cellach is the abbot. Cellach forbids Brendan to leave the monastery, which is surrounded by a mysterious forest, and is obsessed with building a high impregnable wall encircling his abbey to prevent Viking attacks. One day, Brendan hears the monks discussing the abbey on the island of Iona, its founder St. Colmcille and master Aidan, the renowned book illustrator. Aidan arrives at the monastery with his cat Pangur Bán. The Vikings captured Iona and destroyed the monastery, but Aidan managed to save the main treasure: the incomplete Book of Iona, an illuminated manuscript said to be illustrated so beautifully that its pages emit light that blinds the unworthy.

Aidan takes up residence in the monastery's scriptorium. Seeing Brendan's interest in the Book, Aidan tasks him with bringing gall nuts from the forest. Using a secret passage, Brendan, accompanied by Pangur Bán, makes his way into the forest, where he is attacked by wolves. However, the wolves depart upon the arrival of the shapeshifting forest fairy Aisling. Brendan and Aisling become friends, collect the gall nuts, and explore the forest. Brendan discovers an entrance to a dark cave that Aisling fearfully says is the domain of the evil spirit Crom Cruach, who killed her parents, and Aisling narrowly prevents Brendan from entering.

Aidan makes ink with the gall nuts and begins teaching Brendan to draw. Seeing his progress, he admits that Brendan will have to complete the Book, as Aidan's advancing age is affecting his eyesight and draftsmanship. Despite Brendan's talent, he requires the Eye of Colmcille, a crystal magnifying lens, for the final drawing. Such a crystal belonged to St. Colmcille, but during Aidan's escape from Iona, it was lost and broken by the Vikings. Brendan recognizes the crystal as belonging to Crom and attempts to go back to its cave, but he is apprehended by Cellach and confined to his room. Freed by Aisling and Pangur Bán, Brendan goes to Crom's cave and convinces Aisling to help him pass the blocked entrance, during which Aisling appears to be consumed. Brendan battles the snake-like Crom and succeeds in tearing out its remaining eye, leaving Crom to blindly and perpetually consume itself. Returning to the cave entrance, Brendan finds the forest covered in white flowers.

Brendan returns to the abbey and secretly continues assisting Aidan with the new Eye of Colmcille, watched excitedly by the brothers of the monastery. A wounded messenger from outside warns Cellach that the Vikings are approaching. As the Vikings penetrate more of the Irish lands, the abbey becomes a sanctuary to more refugees from the surrounding lands. By winter, the whole of the abbey grounds are covered by a refugee encampment. Cellach discovers Brendan and Aidan in the scriptorium and angrily rips out a page that Brendan has created before locking the two inside. The following winter, the Vikings breach the front gate and storm the monastery, killing everyone outside of the chapel and seriously wounding Cellach. Brendan and Aidan escape the Vikings by using their ink-making process to create a smokescreen, but find themselves unable to help Cellach or anyone else and flee to the forest with the Book at hand. Vikings catch the two and remove the Book's pages, taking only the bejeweled cover before they are repelled by wolves. Brendan briefly reunites with Aisling in her wolf form while collecting the scattered pages.

Brendan and Aidan spend the next several years in exile working to complete the Book and preaching its scriptures. Eventually, an adult Brendan is guided by Aisling back to Kells, where he reunites with the remorseful Cellach. Brendan uses the page Cellach has kept to finally complete the book, and the two happily look upon the newly christened Book of Kells together.

== Cast ==
- Evan McGuire as Brendan, a bright, imaginative, and curious 12-year-old who leads a sheltered life.
  - Michael McGrath as Adult Brendan
- Brendan Gleeson as Abbot Cellach, Brendan's uncle, who is a former illuminator who now superintends a wall to protect the Abbey of Kells from a Viking invasion.
- Christen Mooney as Aisling, a forest fairy, related to the Tuatha Dé Danann, living in the woods outside of Kells.
- Mick Lally as Brother Aidan, a wizard-esque master illuminator. This was noted to be Lally's last film before his death on 31 August 2010.
- Liam Hourican as Brothers Tang and Leonardo. Tang is an illuminator from Asia, in this case, China, and Brother Leonardo is an illuminator from Italy.
- Paul Tylak as Brother Assoua, an illuminator from Africa, a Moor, in this case.
- Paul Young as Brother Square, an illuminator from England

== Production ==
The film was originally titled Rebel: Turning Darkness into Light before being renamed to Brendan and the Secret of Kells in 2004, and then The Secret of Kells. Aisling wasn't initially planned for the film and is absent from the concept trailer. She wouldn't be created and added to the film until a couple of years after the concept trailer's creation. The film originally started out as a 50 minute TV special and is stated as such on Cartoon Saloon's original website, but it eventually grew into an animated film instead.

== Influences ==
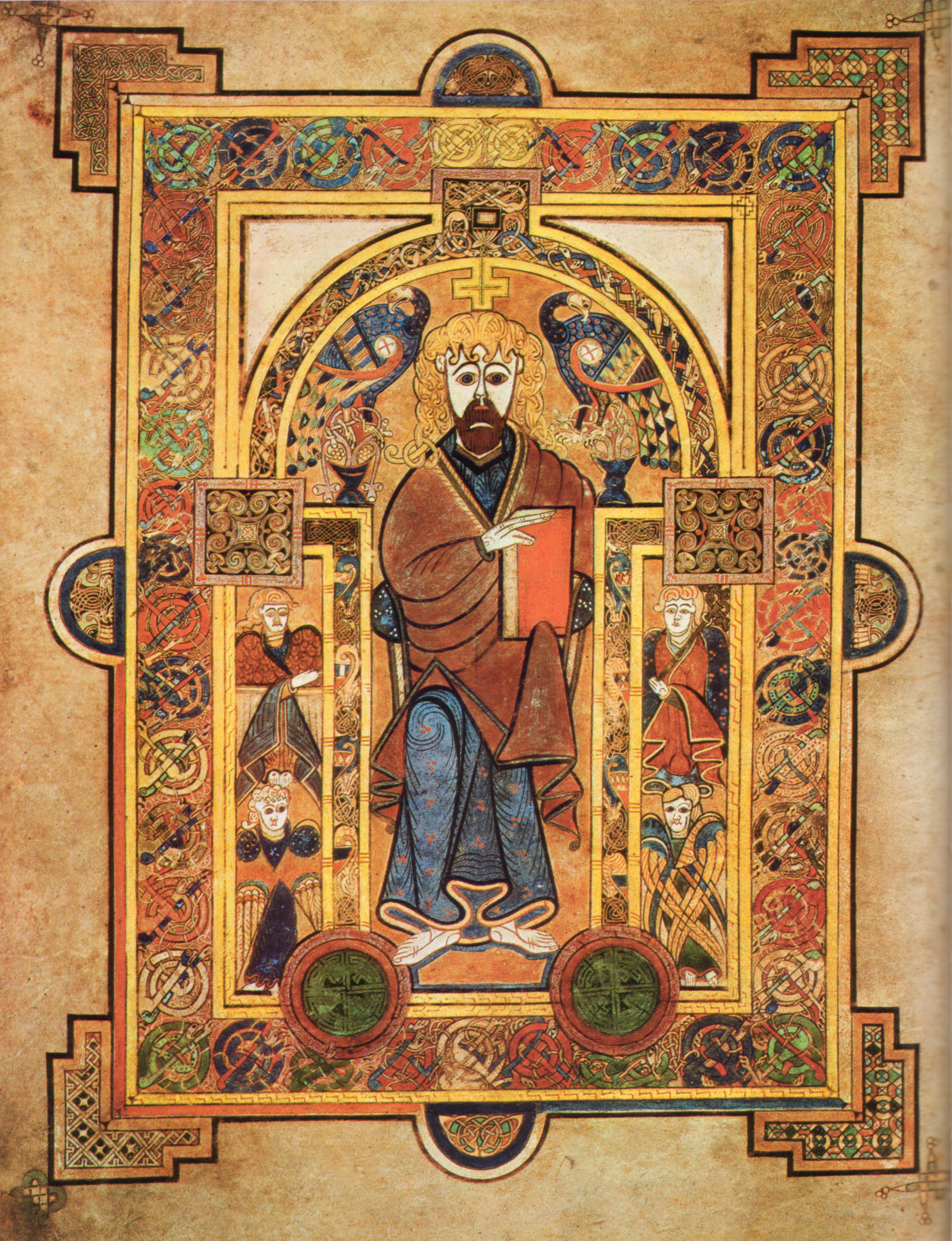
Folio 32v of the original Book of Kells shows Christ enthroned.

The film is based on the story of the origin of the Book of Kells, an illuminated manuscript Gospel book in Latin, containing the four Gospels of the New Testament located in Dublin, Ireland. It also draws upon Celtic mythology; examples include its inclusion of Crom Cruach, a pre-Christian Irish deity and the reference to the poetic genre of Aislings, in which a poet is confronted by a dream or vision of a seeress, in the naming of the forest sprite encountered by Brendan. Wider mythological similarities have also been commented upon, such as parallels between Brendan's metaphysical battle with Crom Cruach and Beowulf's underwater encounter with Grendel's mother. The Secret of Kells began development in 1999, when Tomm Moore and several of his friends were inspired by Richard Williams's The Thief and the Cobbler, Disney's Mulan, Gustav Klimt's paintings, John Bauer's illustrations and the works of Hayao Miyazaki, which based their visual style on the respective traditional art of the cultures featured in each film. They decided to do something similar to Studio Ghibli's films but with Irish art. Tomm Moore explained that the visual style was inspired by Celtic and medieval art, being 'flat, with false perspective and lots of colour'. Even the cleanup was planned to 'obtain the stained glass effect of thicker outer lines'.

== Reception ==
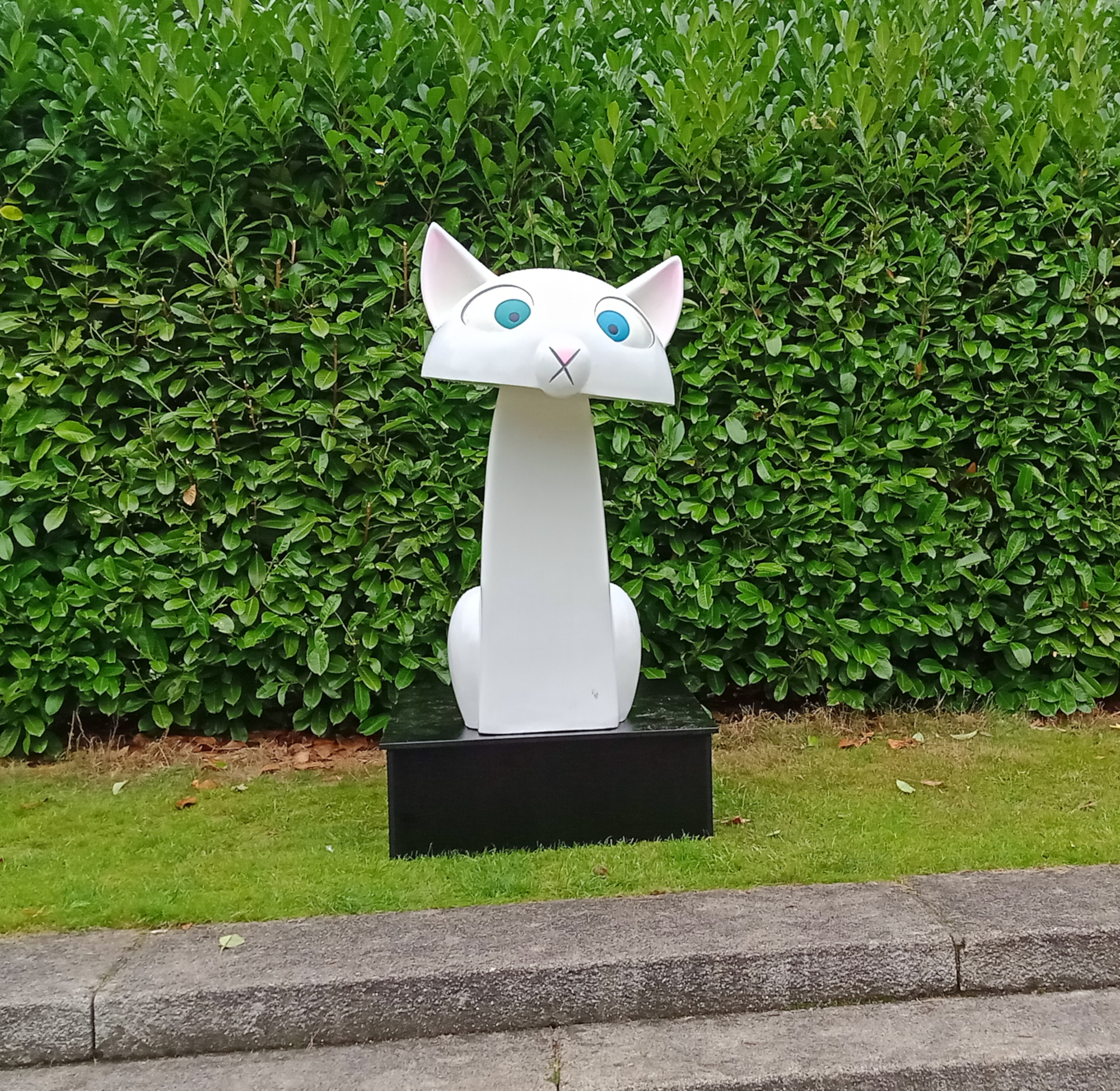
Sculpture of the character Pángúr Bán from The Secret of Kells in the Kilkenny Castle Rose Garden

The film was very well received by critics. On Rotten Tomatoes it has an approval rating of 90% based on 84 reviews, with an average rating of 7.6/10. Rotten Tomatoes critics concluded that the film was "Beautifully drawn and refreshingly calm, The Secret of Kells hearkens back to animation's golden age with an enchanting tale inspired by Irish mythology." On Metacritic, the film has a weighted average score of 81 out of 100, based on 20 reviews, indicating "universal acclaim".

Some critics compared the film to Hayao Miyazaki's works such as Princess Mononoke and Spirited Away. Joe Morgenstern of The Wall Street Journal said that "it pays homage to Celtic culture and design, together with techniques and motifs that evoke Matisse, Miyazaki and the minimalist cartoons of UPA".

Gary Thompson of the Philadelphia Daily News said The Secret of Kells "is noteworthy for its unique, ornate design, its moments of silence... and gorgeous music". Leslie Felperin of Variety magazine praised the film as "Refreshingly different" and "absolutely luscious to behold". Jeremy W. Kaufmann of Ain't It Cool News called its animation "absolutely brilliant", and reviewers at Starlog called it "one of the greatest hand-drawn independent animated movies of all time". Writing for the Los Angeles Times, Charles Solomon ranked the film the tenth-best anime on his "Top 10". On Oscar weekend it was released at the IFC Center in New York City and was then released in other venues and cities in the United States, where it grossed US$667,441.

According to Paul Young, CEO of Cartoon Saloon, "Kells came out and it didn’t really make much of an impact in Ireland... It made more waves in the US. It got picked up by GKIDS Films, which was the first time they had theatrically distributed a movie".

Director Tomm Moore admitted in a now deleted tweet that he regrets the stereotypical design of Brother Assoua and said that he should've gone with a less "cartoony" approach and gotten a person of color to design him instead.

== Accolades ==
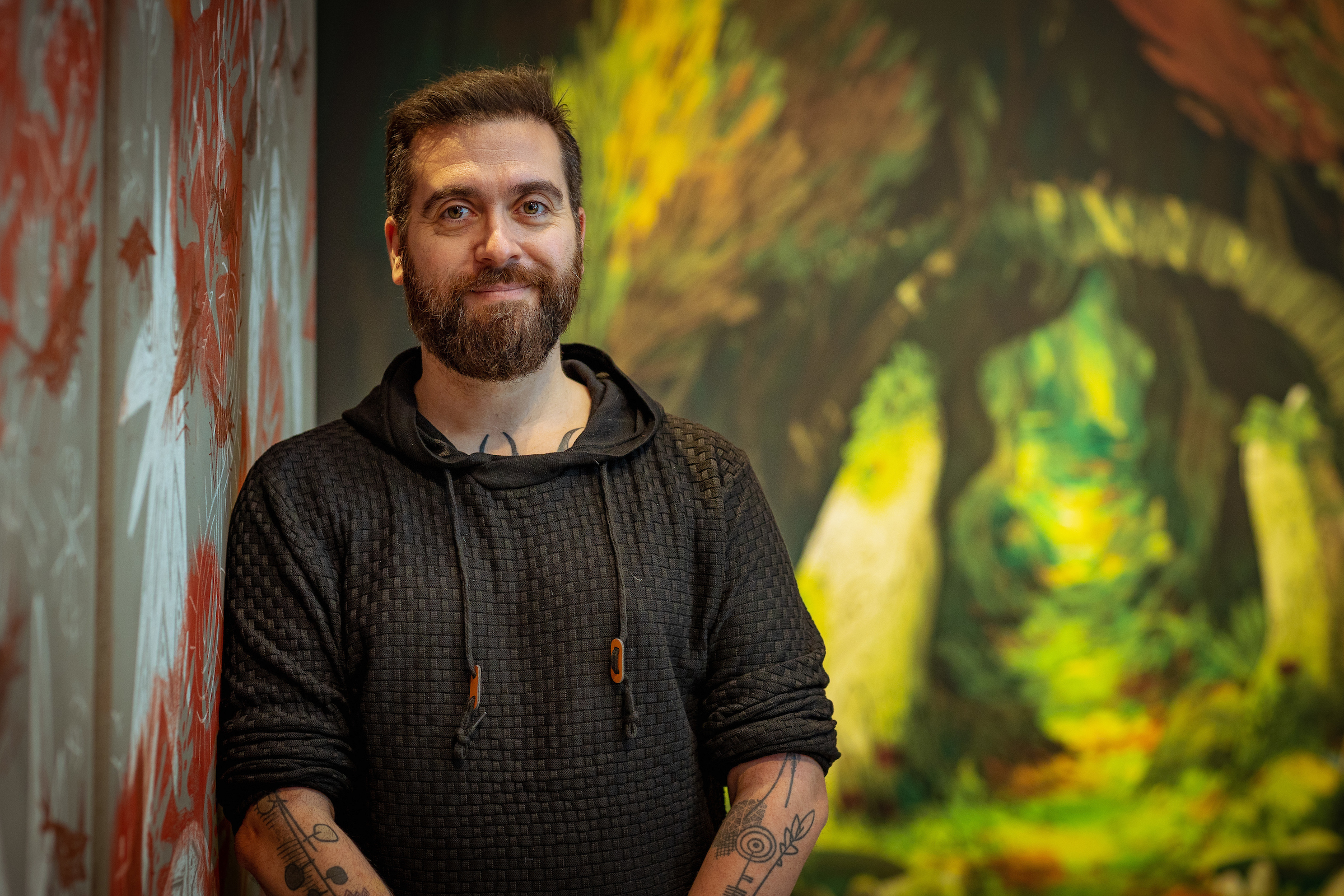
Tomm Moore, writer-director of 'The Secret of Kells'

Wins

- 2008: Directors Finders Award at the Directors Finders Series in Ireland
- 2009: Audience Award at the Annecy International Animation Film Festival
- 2009: Audience Award at the Edinburgh International Film Festival
- 2009: Roy E. Disney Award at Seattle's 2D Or Not 2D Animation Festival
- 2009: Grand Prize at the Seoul International Cartoon and Animation Festival
- 2009: Audience Award at the 9th Kecskemét Animation Film Festival; Kecskemét City Prize at the 6th Festival of European Animated Feature Films and TV Specials
- 2010: Best Animation award at the 7th Irish Film & Television Awards
- 2010: European Animated Feature Award at the British Animation Awards

Nominations

- 2009: Grand Prix Award for Best Film in the Annecy International Animation Film Festival
- 2009: Best Animated Film at the 22nd European Film Awards
- 2009: Best Animated Feature at the 37th Annie Awards
- 2010: Best Film at the 7th Irish Film & Television Awards
- 2010: Best Animated Feature at the 82nd Academy Awards

== See also ==
- Lists of animated films
- Book of Kells
- Cartoon Saloon
- Iona
- Illuminated manuscript
- Insular illumination

== Literature ==
- Keazor, Henry, "Stil, Symbol, Struktur: 'The Tree of Life' als Motiv im Film", in: Der achte Tag. Naturbilder in der Kunst des 21. Jahrhunderts, edited by Frank Fehrenbach and Matthias Krüger, Berlin/Boston 2016, p. 163 - 200
- Moore, Tomm (February 2013). The Secret of Kells. O'Brien Press Limited. ISBN 978-1-84717-584-7.
- Moore, Tomm; Stewart, John Ross (2014). Designing the Secret of Kells. Cartoon Saloon. ISBN 978-0-9929163-0-5.
