= Evan McGuire =

Irish voice actor

Evan McGuire (born 1995 in Claregalway) is an Irish voice actor.

McGuire voiced the protagonist, Brendan, in the Oscar-nominated animated film The Secret of Kells.

Evan McGuire is also an avid drama player, athlete, and a qualified piano teacher.

During the Powerade On Your Marks event at London's newly opened Olympic Stadium on 4 May 2012, McGuire set the first stadium record in the 100 metres. He took part in the event as part of a cohort of Irish competitors accompanied by Derval O'Rourke.
