= Love at First Byte =

Love at First Byte is a play-on-words of the phrase "love at first sight" and may refer to:

- Love at First Byte, 2000 book by Christine Harris

== Television ==
- Love @ First Byte: The Secret Science of Online Dating, 2012 CNBC documentary

=== Episodes ===
- "Love at First Byte", The Facts of Life, 1984
- "Love at First Byte", Small Wonder, 1988
- "Love at First Byte", Hurricanes, 1994
- "Love at First Byte", Phineas and Ferb, 2013

== See also ==
- Love at First Bite, 1979 film
- Love at First Bite (1950 film)
