= Fabrice Ziolkowski =

French screenwriter (born 1954)

- Born: January 28, 1954 (age 72); Charleville-Mézières, France
- Occupations: Screenwriter; director; producer; writer
- Years active: 1980–present
- Known for: The Secret of Kells
- Spouse: Luli Barzman
- Children: Marina Ziolkowski
- Website: https://www.fabriceziolkowski.com

Fabrice Ziolkowski (born January 28, 1954) is a French-American screenwriter, filmmaker, translator, and voice director. He is best known for writing the screenplay for the Academy Award-nominated animated feature The Secret of Kells, for his work in television animation including Gawayn, and for directing the experimental documentary L.A.X. His work spans feature animation, documentary and experimental cinema, television writing, translation, voice direction, and film criticism.

== Background ==
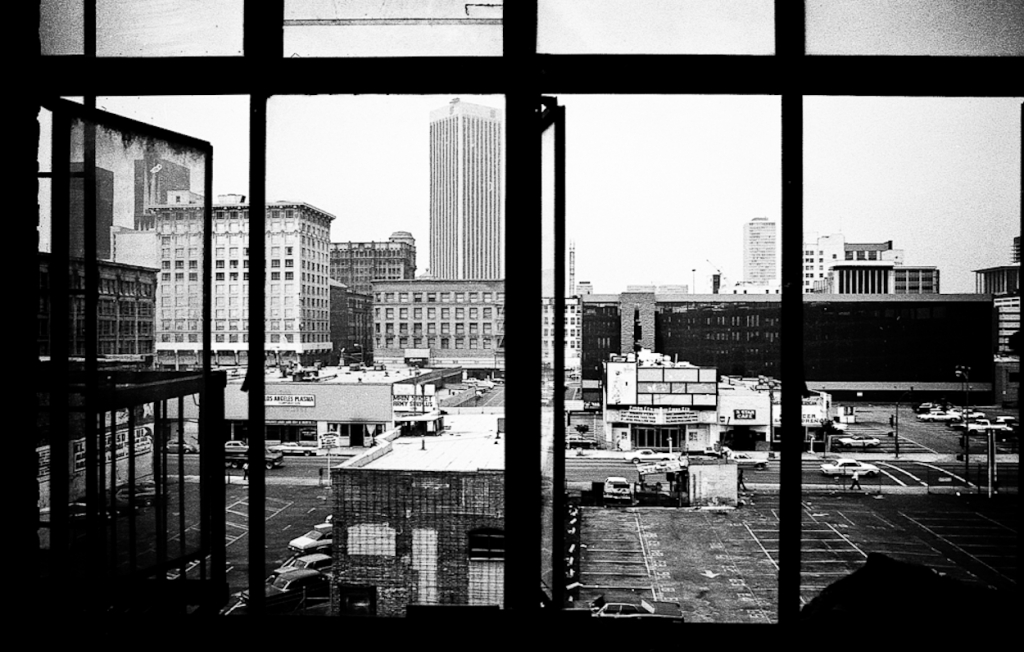
L.A.X. (1980)

Fabrice Ziolkowski was born in Charleville-Mézières, France. His family emigrated, first to Canada, then to the United States. He studied at the Brooks Institute of Photography, received a BA and MA in film and literature from the University of California at Santa Barbara, and did doctoral work at the University of California, Los Angeles (UCLA).

== Career ==
Ziolkowski started his career as a member of the Lumina film group which included experimental filmmaker MM Serra. He is foremost a screenwriter, but has also directed and produced films. Since 2005, he has worked as a voice actor and director.

== Personal life ==
Ziolkowski resides in France with his spouse Luli Barzman (daughter of screenwriters Ben Barzman and Norma Barzman). The two have collaborated on various projects for years, from screenwriting to producing and directing documentaries. His daughter Marina Ziolkowski is also a filmmaker.

== Works ==
Ziolkowski is best known for his screenplay of the acclaimed animated film The Secret of Kells. The Hollywood Reporter described it as a "stirring tale" of "universal themes of the transcendent power of imagination and following one's dreams" in an "Irish-legend-and-lore-laced script " The New York Times noted that "A gentle spirit of syncretism suffuses The Secret of Kells." Variety called it a "... tour-de-force."

His experimental documentary L.A.X. continues to receive notice: film scholar David James has called it "a disabused, skeptical rendering of the city's grittier underside" which reveals "the noir realities behind the sunshine." It has been described as "an essay" on Los Angeles, an "experimental documentary, and "a fictional structure... a journey through the city."

=== Director ===
- L.A.X. (1980) documentary
- Death Letters (2000) documentary
- Yeah! Yeah! Yeah! (2012) documentary

=== Producer ===
- The 1001 Lives of Lia Rodrigues (2006) documentary
- Back to Kinshasa (2003) documentary

=== Screenwriter ===
- The Secret of Kells (2009) feature film
- Gawayn (2009–2012) animated television series
- The Mysteries of Providence (2002) television series
- Billy the Cat (1996) television series
- The Adventures of the Black Stallion (1990) television series
- Circles in a Forest (1991) feature film (with Luli Barzman)
- Highlander: The Series

=== Publications and other writings ===
Ziolkowski has written on screenwriting, cinema, and filmmakers. With Luli Barzman, he co-authored Introduction au scénario. He has contributed essays to Senses of Cinema, and co-edited World Film Locations: Los Angeles, Volume 2.

- Introduction au scénario, with Luli Barzman
- World Film Locations: Los Angeles, Volume 2, co-edited with Gabriel Solomons and Jared Cowan, Intellect Books, 2024.
- "Comedies and Proverbs: An Interview with Eric Rohmer" (1981)
- Selected essays in Senses of Cinema.
