= Poppy (given name) =

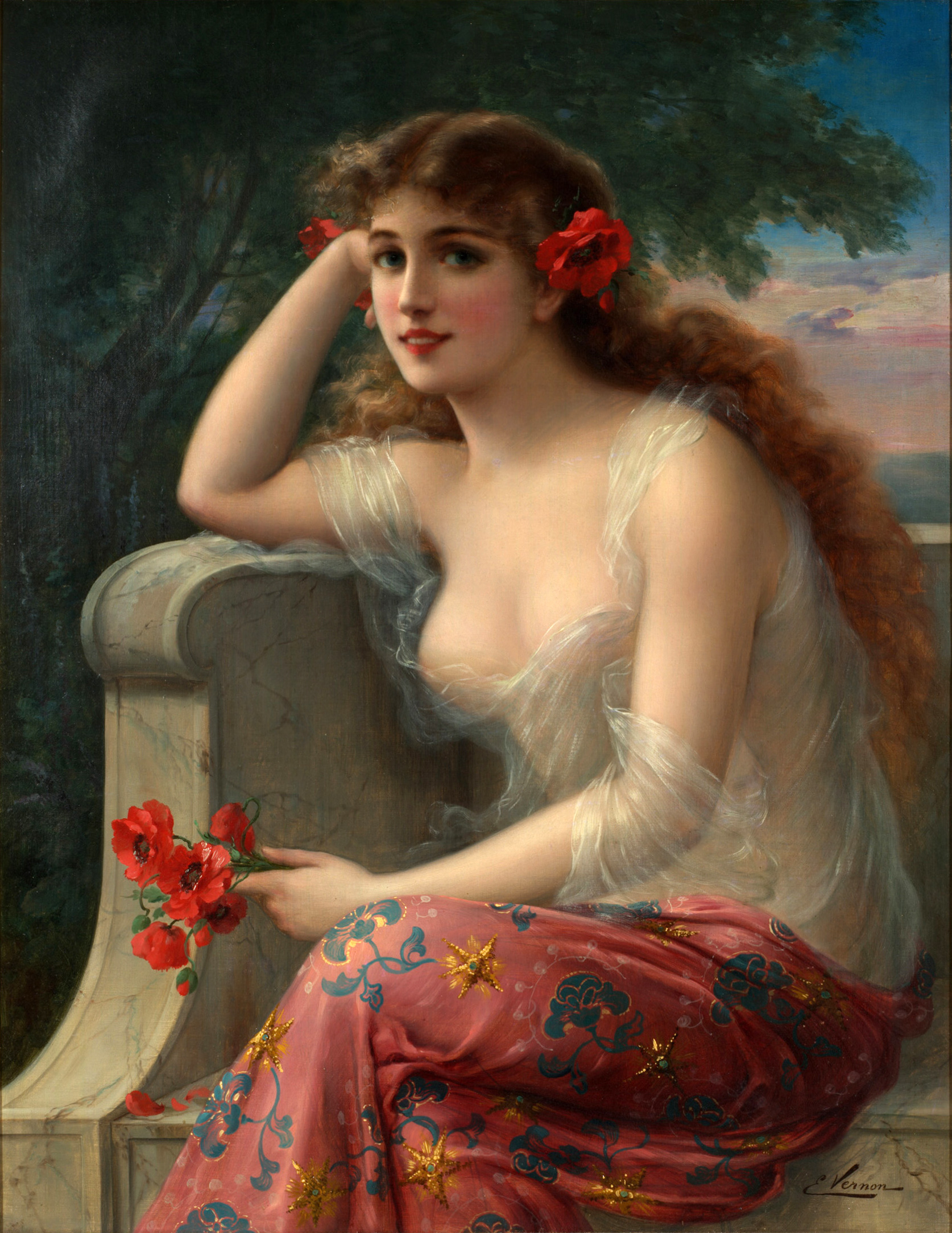
- Girl with a Poppy by Émile Vernon.
- Gender: Female

Origin
- Origin: English
- Meaning: "poppy"
- Region of origin: United Kingdom

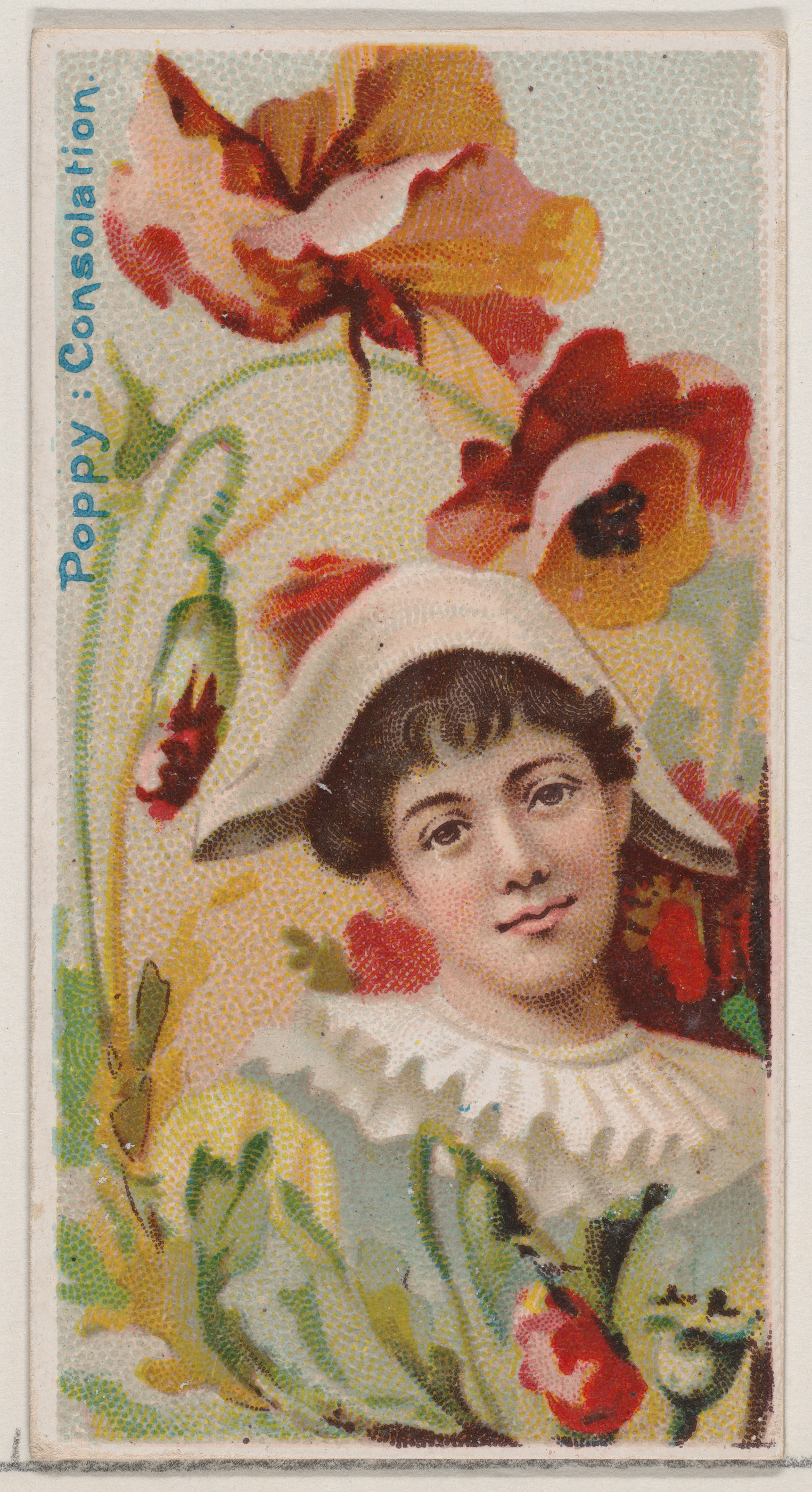
The poppy is said to signify consolation in the language of flowers.

Poppy is a feminine given name derived from the name of the flower poppy, itself derived from the Old English popæg and referring to various species of Papaver. The name has been among the one hundred most popular names for girls in England and Wales since 1996 and among the top twenty-five names for girls since 2009. It has also recently risen in popularity in other countries in the English-speaking world, including Australia, Canada, New Zealand, and the United States. The popularity of the name coincides with increased use for girls of other flower names and names inspired by the natural world. Increased awareness of the name has also been attributed to the naming of the children of some celebrities.

== People named Poppy ==
- Poppy (born 1995), stage name of American musician Moriah Pereira
- Poppy Ackroyd (born 1982), British composer, pianist and violinist
- Poppy Adams, British television documentary director, producer and novelist
- Poppy Ajudha (born 1995), English singer-songwriter
- Poppy Arford, American politician
- Poppy Z. Brite (born 1967), American author
- Poppy Cannon (1905–1975), South African-American food editor and cookbook writer
- Poppy de Villeneuve (born 1979), English director and photographer
- Poppy Delevingne (born 1986), British model and socialite
- Poppy Drayton (born 1991), British actress
- Poppy Gilbert (born 1998), Swedish-born British actress
- Poppy Gustafsson, Baroness Gustafsson (born 1982), British businesswoman and Labour Party life peer
- Poppy Harlow (born 1982), American journalist
- Poppy Jhakra (born 1984), English actress
- Poppy King (born 1972), Australian entrepreneur
- Poppy Mercury (1972–1995), Indonesian singer
- Poppy Miller (born 1969), English actress
- Poppy Montgomery (born 1972), Australian-American actress
- Poppy Pattinson (born 2000), English footballer
- Poppy Reid, editor-in-chief of The Music Network
- Poppy Soper (born 2002), Welsh association football player
- Poppy Starr Olsen (born 2000), Australian skateboarder

== Fictional characters ==
- Poppy, Keeper of the Hammer, a playable champion character in the MOBA video game League of Legends
- Poppy, a mouse in Avi's novels Poppy and Poppy and Rye
- Poppy, a supporting character from the video game Dragon Quest: Young Yangus and the Mystery Dungeon
- Poppy, one of the bowtruckle pets of Newt Scamander in the Fantastic Beasts films
- Queen Poppy (formerly Princess Poppy) in DreamWorks' Trolls franchise
- Poppy, a yellow cockatiel in Angry Birds Stella and The Angry Birds Movie
- Poppy, in the Kate Cann novel Leaving Poppy
- Poppy, Keeper of the Hammer, a playable champion character in the multiplayer online battle arena video game League of Legends
- Poppy, on Huge (TV series)
- Poppy, squirrel villager in the Animal Crossing video games
- Poppy, the dog of Galford D. Weller from the Samurai Shodown series of fighting games
- Poppy, the principal character in 2008 film Happy-Go-Lucky
- Poppy Adams, from Kingsman: The Golden Circle
- Poppy Brown, from the novel The Stonewalkers by Vivien Alcock
- Poppy Burt-Jones, in the novel White Teeth by Zadie Smith
- Poppy Carew, protagonist of the novel The Vacillations of Poppy Carew by Mary Wesley
- Poppy Cat, the main character in a series of books created by Lara Jones
- Poppy Champion, minor character in the sixth series of Skins (UK TV series) played by Holly Earl
- Poppy Colfax, in the 2009 film Fired Up
- Poppy Eyebright, a mouse in Jill Barklem's Brambly Hedge book series
- Poppy Li, a main character in the show Mythic Quest
- Poppy Lifton, in Gossip Girl, 2008–2012
- Poppy Marshall, one of Haley Dunphy's twins in ABC's Modern Family
- Poppy Meadow, in EastEnders
- Poppy Meldrum, on the television series You Rang, M'Lord?
- Poppy Moore, the main character in the 2008 film Wild Child
- Poppy North, the main character in the first book of the Night World series Secret Vampire
- Poppy O'Hair, twin sister of Holly O'Hair and daughter of Rapunzel from Ever After High
- Poppy Playtime, the titular doll from the mascot horror game of the same name, Poppy Playtime
- Poppy Pomfrey, Hogwarts staff member in the Harry Potter series
- Poppy Prescott, a character in the 2024 film Despicable Me 4
- Poppy Shakespeare, the title character in a novel by Clare Allan
- Poppy Thornapple, in the book The War of the Flowers
- Poppy Wyatt, the protagonist of the novel I've Got Your Number by Sophie Kinsella
- Poppy, an Elite Four member in Pokémon Scarlet and Violet
- Poppy, a character in the indie video game Jackpot Crash Course
