= Flora Balzano =

Canadian actor, writer and dub actor

- Born: 24 May 1951 (age 75); Algiers, Algeria
- Occupations: Writer; voice actor
- Writing career
- Notable awards: Finalist for Governor General's Award; 1991 Soigne ta chute

Flora Balzano (born 24 May 1951 in Algiers) is a Canadian writer and comedian, best known for her novel Soigne ta chute, which has been the subject of academic study. She was a finalist of the 1991 Governor General's Awards for having written the novel Soigne ta chute. In addition, she had a career in voice acting, with one of her main roles being Martin Prince in the Québec version of The Simpsons.

== Writings ==
=== Novel ===
- Soigne ta chute, Montréal, XYZ editor, "Romanichels" collection, 1991. 120 pages. (ISBN 9782892610475)

=== Short stories ===
- Quatre nouvelles (1988)
- La Première Fois (1989)
- Terre de mes aïeux (1990)
- Chantemé (1991)
- La Croûte (1992)
- Encore pas un roman (1992)
- C'est la sève qui compte (1992)
- Des couilles (1992)

== Honours and awards ==
- 1991 : Finalist, Governor General's Awards.
