= Protécréa =

- Type: Subsidiary
- Founded: 1985; 41 years ago
- Headquarters: Paris, France
- Services: Television production
- Owner: TF1

Protécréa is a subsidiary of French broadcaster TF1, based in Paris. Productions from the company include the animated The Adventures of Paddington Bear (1997), The Mysteries of Providence, Bob and Scott, and The Bellflower Bunnies, and the 1990s CNBC series Ushuaia: The Ultimate Adventure.
