= Melusine Productions =

Luxembourgish animation company

- Type: Division
- Founded: 1997
- Headquarters: Howald, Luxembourg
- Services: Animation production
- Owner: Superprod Group (2024–present)
- Parent: Studio 352
- Website: www.melusinestudio.com

Melusine Productions is an animation company based in Howald, Luxembourg.

== History ==
The studio has produced series such as The Bellflower Bunnies, The Mysteries of Providence and Liberty's Kids. It has also produced the movies Song of the Sea, The Breadwinner and Wolfwalkers with Irish studio Cartoon Saloon, all of which have been Oscar nominated for Best Animated Feature, Melusine is a subsidiary of Studio 352, which is owned by Superprod.

In April 2, 2024, Melusine Productions and Studio 352 was brought out by French audiovisual group Superprod Group (also known as its animation production division Superprod Animation), who previously worked on Song of the Sea with Melusine.

Melusine Productions was nominated three times for the Oscars, twice for the Golden Globes, four times for the European Film Awards, and five times for the Césars.

== Filmography ==
Title	Release date	Distributor	Notes
Ernest & Celestine	December 12, 2012 (France); December 19, 2012 (Belgium)	StudioCanal; CinéArt (Belgium)	co-production with Les Armateurs and La Parti Productions
Song of the Sea	December 10, 2014 (France/Belgium/Luxembourg); February 19, 2015 (Denmark); July 10, 2015 (Ireland)	Haut et Court; O'Brother Distribution (Belgium); StudioCanal (Ireland); Svensk Filmindustri (Scandinavia)	co-production with Superprod Animation, Cartoon Saloon, Big Farm and Noerlum Studios
Ethel & Ernest	December 28, 2016	Universal Pictures; Vertigo Releasing	co-production with Lupus Films, Ethel & Ernest Productions, Cloth Cat Animation, BFI and Ffilm Cymru Wales
Richard the Stork	May 11, 2017 (Germany)	Wild Bunch (Germany)	co-production with Ulysses Filmproduktion, Knunsen & Streuber Medienmanufaktur and Walking the Dog and Den Siste Skilling
The Breadwinner	December 8, 2017 (Canada); May 28, 2018 (Ireland)	StudioCanal (Ireland); Elevation Pictures (Canada)	co-production with Cartoon Saloon, Aircraft Pictures, Guru Studio and Jolie Pas Productions
Wolfwalkers	December 2, 2020 (Ireland); December 16, 2020 (France)	Haut et Court; Wildcard Distribution (Ireland); Apple TV+ (Worldwide)	co-production with Cartoon Saloon
Le Voyage de Prince	2021 (USA)	Urban Distribution International	co-production with Jean-François Laguionie, Xavier Picard, Blue Spirit Productions
The Summit of the Gods	September 21, 2021	Diaphana Distribution	co-production with Julianne Films, Folivari, Wild Bunch and France 3 Cinema
Kensuke's Kingdom	7 February 2024; 2 August 2024 (United Kingdom)	Le Pacte; Modern Films (United Kingdom)	co-production with Lupus Films, Jigsaw Films, Align, Cinema Management Group, Bankside Films, Film Cymru Wales, Film Fund Luxembourg, BFI, Le Pacte and Bumpybox
