= Beechwood Bunny Tales =

French children's book series

- Author: Geneviève Huriet and Amélie Sarn
- Illustrator: Loïc Jouannigot
- Genre: Children's literature
- Publisher: France Éditions Milan; USA Gareth Stevens
- Published: France 1987 - present
- Published in English: USA 1991 & 1992
- Media type: Print

Beechwood Bunny Tales (French: La Famille Passiflore) is a series of children's books written by French author Geneviève Huriet and illustrated by Loïc Jouannigot. The original books have been published in France by Éditions Milan since 1987. English translations of the first seven stories were released in the United States during 1991 and 1992 by Gareth Stevens Publishers. Including this version, Beechwood has been translated into 23 languages in 19 countries, and has sold about 750,000 copies in its native country.

The books centre on the Bellflower family of rabbits, who live in Beechwood Grove: Papa Bramble, Aunt Zinnia, Dandelion, Periwinkle, Violette, Mistletoe, and Poppy. The father share his name with a certain food, while his five children as well as his sister Zinnia (and the whole family itself) are named after flowers and plants. All of the rabbit characters in this series have large, round pink tails.

The books' success in France led to the debut of an animated version on the TF1 network in late December 2001, which would go on to have 52 episodes produced. The show has aired in several markets worldwide, and released on DVD and VHS in North America.

== Characters ==
The Bellflowers in a scene from Mistletoe and the Baobab Tree, with the title character of this book in bed.

The series' main characters are the Bellflower rabbits, who live "in a shady corner of Beechwood Grove". There are five children in the family: Poppy, the eldest and the smartest; Violette, the only sister and of course a strong-spirited girl; Dandelion, a lovable yet dimwitted boy who mostly resembles his father; Mistletoe, who wears a cap and a shirt of magenta and pink stripes; and Periwinkle, who is kindhearted but mostly shy, and he too resembles his father, but deeply.

Their father is Bramble, a gifted inventor and gardener who is always concerned and caring about his children. Their aunt, Zinnia, can sometimes be a bit angry and serious against them.

Most of the early titles in the Beechwood series centred on each of the children. Aunt Zinnia had a story of her own in 1990 (Aunt Zinnia and the Ogre), and Papa Bramble in 2003 (L'invention d'Onésime Passiflore).

Some of the Bellflowers' foes include Magda, a tricky magpie who tries to make Periwinkle a family embarrassment (in the first book, Periwinkle at the Full Moon Ball, and the TV episode "Room to Move"); Jimmy Renard, a cunning young boy from Violette's Daring Adventure; Kazoar, the highway menace from Aunt Zinnia and the Ogre, and two hungry & sneaky foxes named Roderick and Marmaduke from the episode "Carnival" who wanted to kidnap the children for their dinner.

== Books ==
As of 2008, more than thirty Beechwood books from Éditions Milan have sold over 750,000 copies in its native France. Geneviève Huriet has written the entire series, save for the two most recent titles (Qu'as-tu fait, Mistouflet? and L'album photo des Passiflore) by Amélie Sarn. Loïc Jouannigot has always been the illustrator including the latest book released in 2023.

In the United States, Gareth Stevens only published the first seven stories in English, from Periwinkle at the Full Moon Ball to Family Moving Day, in 1991 and 1992. The translators were MaryLee Knowlton, Amy Bauman and Patricia Lantier-Sampon.

Elsewhere in Europe, the book series is called La Familia Pasaflor (Spain), A Família Passiflore (Portugal), La Famiglia Passiflora (Italy), De Familie Passiebloem (Netherlands), Familie Löwenzahn (Germany), Wesołe przygody królików (Poland), "Жили-были кролики" (Russia) and Tappancsmesék (Hungary).

== Merchandise ==
- European toy company Ravensburger has made jigsaw puzzles featuring Jouannigot's illustrations from the books.

== TV series ==
The Bellflower Bunnies, an animated TV series based on the books, debuted on the TF1 network in France with four specials during December 24 and December 28, 2001. The 52-episode series was produced early in its run by TVA International, Melusine, TF1 and its subsidiary Protécréa. Later episodes were made by Tooncan, Euro Visual, and Dragon Cartoon among others. It has also aired on Playhouse Disney in France, ZDF and KI.KA in Germany, CBC/Radio Canada in Quebec, and the Latin American version of Boomerang.

== See also ==
- Watership Down, by British author Richard Adams
