= Moran Caouissin =

Animation film director

- Born: 6 July 1963 (age 61)
- Occupation: film director
- Successor: Eric Berthier (The Bellflower Bunnies director)

Moran Caouissin (born 6 July 1963) is an animation film director who first animated for Jacques Colombat's feature film Robinson&Cie (1991), Paul Grimault & Jacques Demy's film La Table Tournante (1998), Disney's DuckTales the Movie: Treasure of the Lost Lamp (1991).

He worked for several films and series as an animator, a lay-out director, an animation director, a storyboard-artist, a model-designer and chara-designer, a storyboard director. As a film director, he directed the first four episodes of TF1's The Bellflower Bunnies, Cédric2, Merlin against the ghosts of Halloween, Marsupilami Houba Houba Hop!, Parker&Badger, Ollie&Moon2...
