= Amélie Sarn =

French author, comic book writer, and translator

Amélie Sarn-Cantin (born 4 March 1970) is a French author, comic book writer, and translator.

== Publications ==
=== Standalone books ===
- Un foulard pour Djelila [I Love I Hate I Miss My Sister]. Milan poche Junior. Translated by Maudet, Y. Milan Poche. 2005. ISBN 978-2-7459-1687-7.
- Les proies. Macadam. Toulouse: Milan. 2012. ISBN 978-2-7459-5978-2.

=== Clairvoyance series ===
1. La maison de l'ombre. Paris: J'ai lu. 2012. ISBN 978-2-290-03801-7.
2. La falaise écarlate. J'ai lu. 2013.

=== Groove High books ===
The Groove High books are illustrated by Virgile Trouillot and translated from French to English by Frédéric Trouillot.

1. L'audition [The Audition]. Milan jeunesse. 2006. ISBN 978-2-7459-2274-8.
2. Panique à bord [Looking for Trouble]. Milan jeunesse. 2006. ISBN 978-2-7459-2275-5.
3. École en folie [A Day of Surprises]. Milan jeunesse. 2006. ISBN 978-2-7459-2276-2.
4. Coups de foudre et coups montés [Love Is in the Air]. Milan jeunesse. 2006. ISBN 978-2-7459-2277-9.
5. Citrouilles et grosses frayeurs [Fear of Pumpkins]. Milan jeunesse. 2007. ISBN 978-2-7459-2278-6.
6. Joyeuses fêtes ! [Happy Holidays]. Milan jeunesse. 2007. ISBN 978-2-7459-2279-3.
7. Tous en scène ! [Everyone on Stage]. Milan jeunesse. 2007. ISBN 978-2-7459-2626-5.
8. Petite recette du bonheur [Recipe for Happiness]. Milan jeunesse. 2007. ISBN 978-2-7459-2627-2.
9. La nouvelle [The New Girl]. Milan jeunesse. 2007. ISBN 978-2-7459-2628-9.
10. La dispute [The Argument]. Milan jeunesse. 2007. ISBN 978-2-7459-2629-6.
11. Duo surprise. Toulouse: Milan jeunesse. 2008. ISBN 978-2-7459-2630-2.
12. Le spectacle continue !. Toulouse: Milan jeunesse. 2008. ISBN 978-2-7459-2631-9.

=== Nanami series ===
The Nanami books are co-written with Éric Corbeyran and illustrated by Nauriel.

1. Le Théâtre du Vent. Dargaud. 2006. ISBN 978-2-871-29876-2.
2. L'Inconnu. Dargauld. 2008. ISBN 978-2-505-00062-4.
3. Le Royaume Invisible. Dargaud. 2010. ISBN 978-2-505-00688-6.
4. Le Prince Noir. Dargaud. 2011. ISBN 978-2-505-01123-1.
5. Le combat final. Dargaud. 2012. ISBN 978-2-505-01386-0.

=== Resurrectio series ===
- Resurrectio. Paris: Seuil. 2014. ISBN 979-10-235-0347-0.
- Trop humaine. Paris: Seuil. 2015. ISBN 979-10-235-0583-2.

=== Rose and Crow series ===
The Rose and Crow books were inked by Lise Garçon.

1. Rose & Crow. Paris: Delcourt. 2021. ISBN 978-2-413-01970-1.
2. Rose & Crow. Paris: Delcourt. 2022. ISBN 978-2-413-03997-6.

== Sources ==
- (in French) Biography of Amélie Sarn at Bedetheque. Retrieved 22 March 2008.
