= Éric Berthier =

French artist

- Occupation: Animation director
- Known for: The Bellflower Bunnies
- Predecessor: Moran Caouissin (The Bellflower Bunnies director)

Éric Berthier is a French animation director.

Berthier directed episode 5 onwards of TF1's The Bellflower Bunnies (French: La Famille Passiflore) based on the children's books by Geneviève Huriet, following the first four episodes which were directed by Moran Caouissin. Berthier also served as director of 2001's Prudence Petitpas, and 2004's Isegrim & Reineke.
