= Milan Presse =

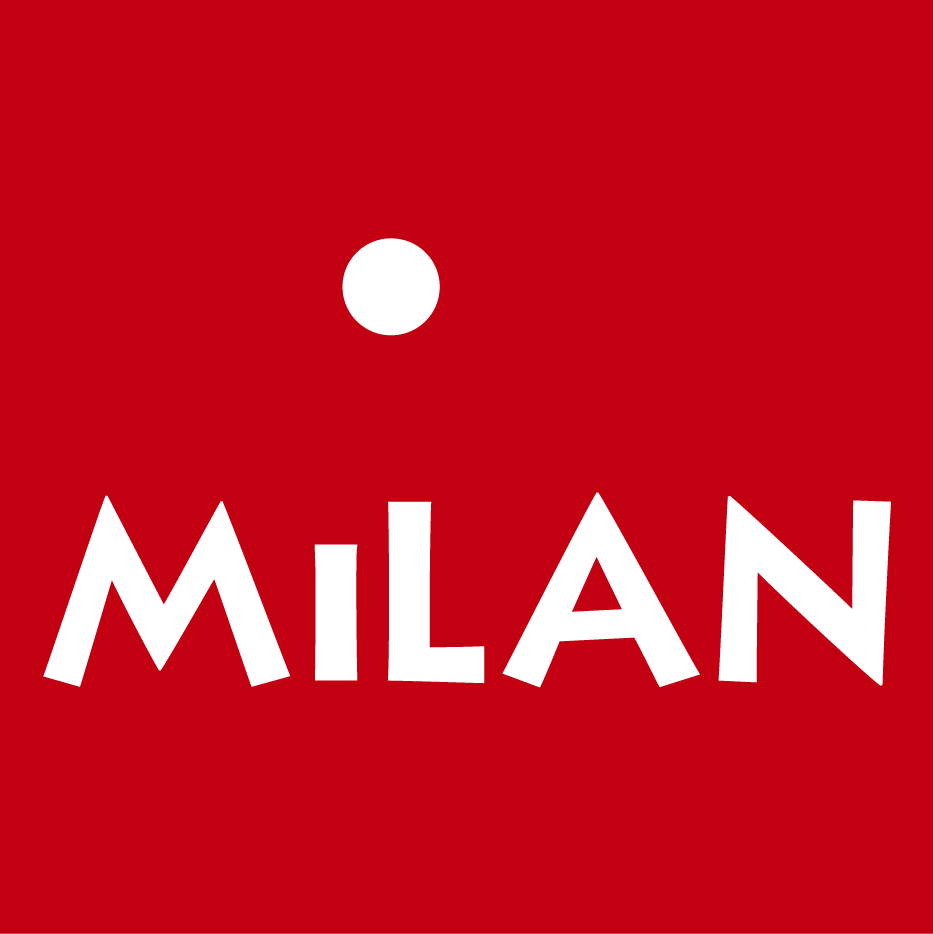
- Company type: Subsidiary
- Industry: publication of journals and periodicals
- Founded: 1980
- Headquarters: Toulouse, France
- Products: Magazines, children's literature
- Owner: Bayard Presse
- Website: http://milanpresse.com

Milan Presse is a publishing company based in Toulouse, France, that has been owned by Bayard Presse since 2004.

It runs an imprint, Éditions Milan, which specialises in children's literature. This branch has published the original Beechwood Bunny Tales (La Famille Passiflore series) by Geneviève Huriet and Amélie Sarn.

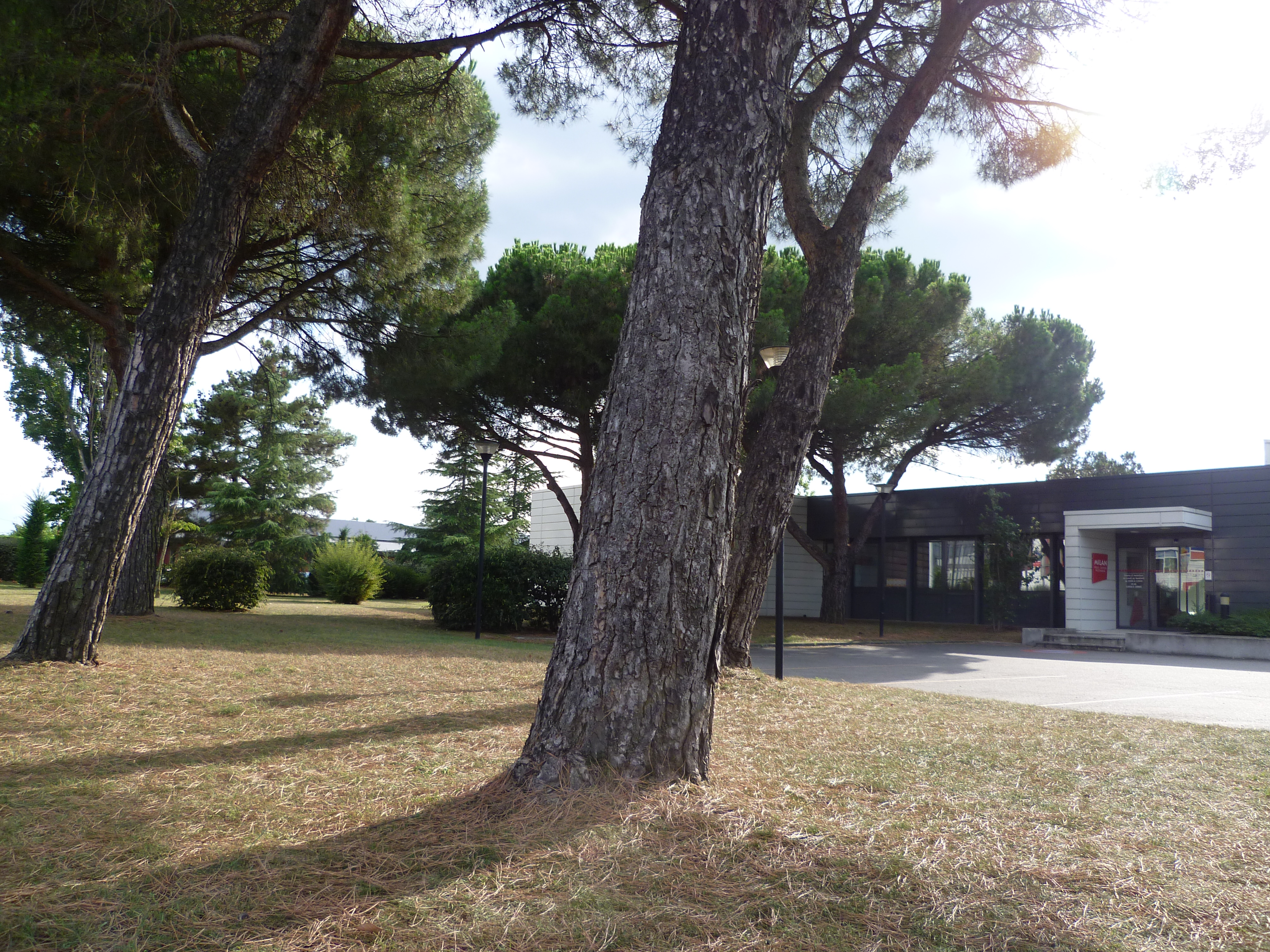
Milan Presse in Toulouse
