= Gareth Stevens =

- Type: Private
- Industry: Publishing
- Founded: December 1983
- Headquarters: Milwaukee, Wisconsin, United States
- Products: Children's books
- Website: garethstevens.com

Gareth Stevens, Inc. is a publishing company originally based in Milwaukee, Wisconsin. It was founded in 1983 by its namesake owner. The company was owned by Weekly Reader Corporation, part of The Reader's Digest Association. In 2009, it was sold to company chief Gary Spears and Roger Rosen of Rosen Publishing.

Gareth Stevens largely specialises in children's non-fiction reference. Along with its main arm, Gareth Stevens Publishing, its imprints include Weekly Reader Early Imprint Library and World Almamac Library.

In 1991 and 1992, it published the English version of the first seven Beechwood Bunny Tales by Geneviève Huriet. The translators were Mary Lee Knowlton, Amy Bauman and Patricia Lantier-Sampon.
