= The Bellflower Bunnies =

French animated series

- The title card for Seasons 2 and 3, with credits imposed over a scene from "Vive la glisse"
- Also known as: La Famille Passiflore (France); Die Häschenbande (Germany); La Famiglia Passiflora (Italy); A Família Cenoura (Portugal); Tappancs család (Hungary); Pupu Pitkäkorva (Finland); De Knuffel Konijntjes (Netherlands); Rodzina Rabatków (Poland) 까르르 토끼 친구들 (South Korea); Os Coelhinhos Bellflower (Brazil) (in Spanish) Los Conejitos Bellflower; Russian: Истории папы Кролика “Uzun Kulak Ailesi” (Turkey)
- Genre: Comedy
- Created by: Geneviève Huriet (original book series, Beechwood Bunny Tales)
- Directed by: Moran Caouissin (season 1); Éric Berthier (seasons 2–3)
- Voices of: See below
- Composers: Daniel Scott (season 1); Valérie Baranski (season 1); Alice Willis (seasons 2–3)
- Countries of origin: France; Canada
- Original languages: French; English
- No. of seasons: 3
- No. of episodes: 52 (list of episodes)

Production
- Executive producers: Patricia Robert; Yves Pont (seasons 2–3); Franck Algard (seasons 2–3)
- Producer: Patricia Robert
- Editors: Graham Chisholm (season 1); Robert Newton (season 1); Lysanne Villeneuve (seasons 2–3)
- Running time: 26 minutes
- Production companies: Protécréa (season 1); TVA International (season 1); Banco Production (season 1); Melusine Productions (season 1); Euro Visual (seasons 2–3); Tooncan (seasons 2–3); Bigcash (season 2)

Original release
- Network: TF1 (France); Playhouse Disney (France, season 2); TVA (Canada, season 1)
- Release: December 24, 2001 – July 13, 2010

The Bellflower Bunnies (French: La Famille Passiflore) is an animated series based on the Beechwood Bunny Tales book series by Geneviève Huriet. The show debuted on TF1 with four episodes airing between December 24 and December 28, 2001. It is a co-production between France's TF1 and several Canadian companies. (Note: Season 2 was produced with the participation of Disney Television France.) 52 episodes were produced.

The show centers on the adventures and exploits of the Bellflower family, a clan of seven rabbits who live in Beechwood Grove, which is called Blueberry Hill in the English version. The two adults in the family, Papa Bramble and Aunt Zinnia, take care of their five children: Periwinkle, Poppy, Mistletoe, Dandelion and Violette.

== Production ==
Early on in its run, the series was produced as a package of four specials by TF1 and its subsidiary, Protécréa, along with TVA International of Montreal and Melusine of Luxembourg; Moran Caouissin, an animator from Disney's DuckTales movie, served as the director. Production of the series began in the fall of 2000, at a cost of over US$2 million, or US$600,000 per episode.

Starting in 2004, later episodes were produced by Euro Visual, Tooncan, Megafun, Bigcash, Dragon Cartoon and Disney Television France. This time, Éric Berthier directed, and Alice Willis composed.

== Home video and DVD ==
=== Europe ===
At least six DVD volumes of The Bellflower Bunnies have been released by TF1, Beez Entertainment and Seven Sept in the franchise's native France, separately and in a box set. In Germany, edelkids released the first sixteen episodes in February and August 2008.

=== North America ===
Feature Films for Families released the first two volumes of the English version on VHS (in 2001) and DVD (in 2003), as part of a marketing deal with TVA. In 2005, another four DVDs were released under the Direct Source brand. Each disc in this version consists of two episodes. Since the DVDs are now next to impossible to find in the USA; Amazon Prime Video and YouTube are currently the only known options in the USA.

== Episodes ==
Fifty-two episodes of The Bellflower Bunnies were produced over the course of three seasons. and all of these have aired in the show's native France; although episodes 39-52 were first aired on German channel KI.KA in May 2008.

== Voice cast ==
=== Season 1 ===
- Tom Clarke-Hill
- Regine Candler
- Tom Eastwood - Papa Bramble
- Rhonda Millar - Periwinkle, Violette (Pirouette)
- Joanna Ruiz Rodriguez - Poppy

=== Seasons 2 & 3 ===
==== English version ====
- Danielle Desormeaux
- Anik Matern - Violette
- Holly Gauthier-Frankel (as Holly Gauthier-Frankle) - Mistletoe
- Eleanor Noble - Periwinkle
- Matt Holland
- Joanna Noyes
- Liz MacRae - Dandelion
- Mark Camacho
- Simon Peacock - Papa Bramble
- Laura Teasdale - Poppy
- Danny Wells
- John Stocker
- Sonja Ball
- Susan Glover
- A.J. Henderson
- Rick Miller
- Rick Jones
- Danny Brochu

==== French version ====
- Flora Balzano
- Julie Burroughs
- Hugolin Chevrette
- Mario Desmarais
- Antoine Durand
- Marylène Gargour
- Annie Girard
- Hélène Lasnier
- Elisabeth Lenormand

== See also ==
- Beechwood Bunny Tales
- Max & Ruby
- Watership Down
- Guess How Much I Love You
