= Loïc Jouannigot =

French children's book illustrator

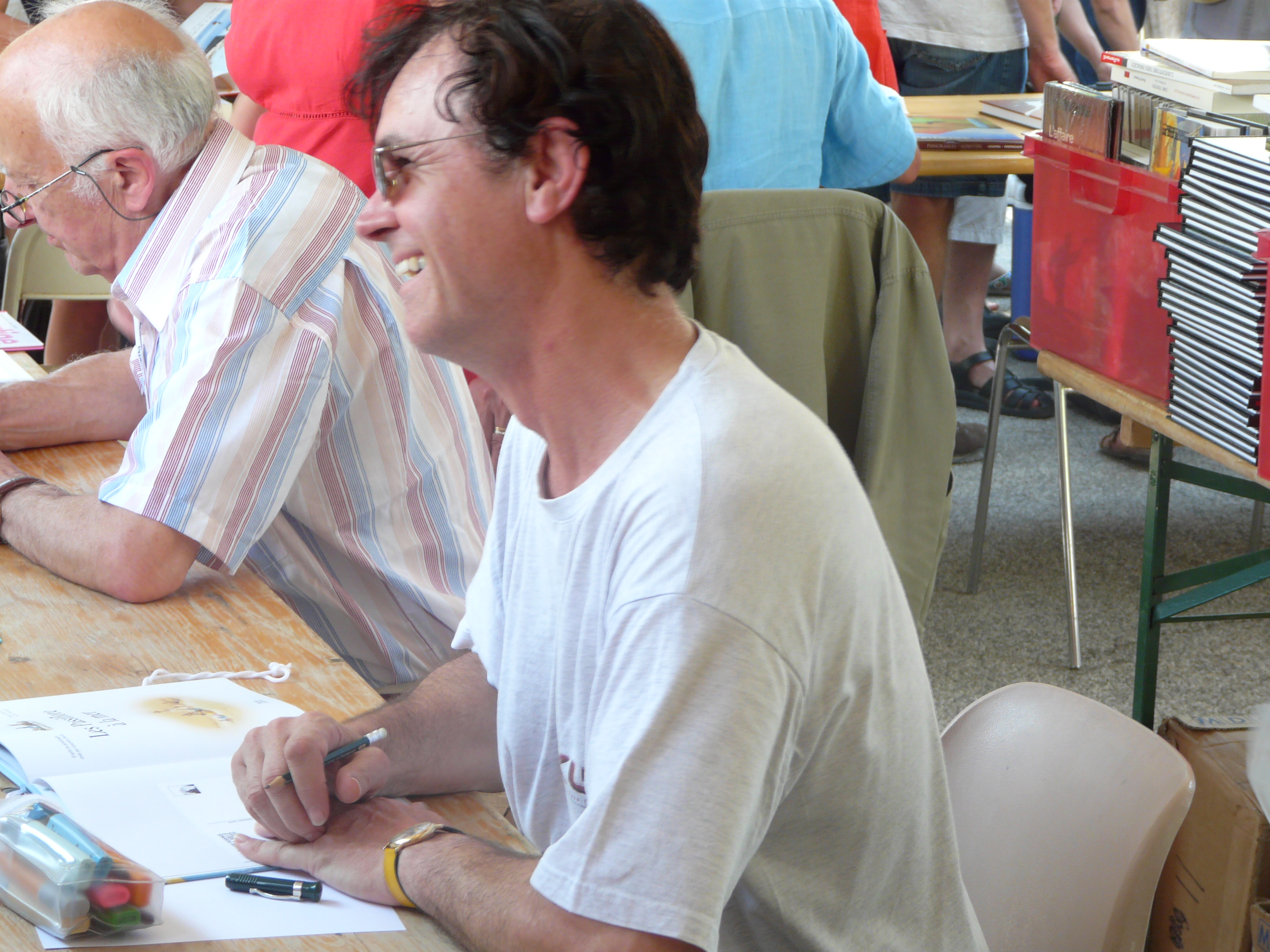
Loic Jouannigot at the International Comic Festival of Sollies Ville, France

Loïc Jouannigot (born 1953 in Brittany, France) is a children's book illustrator. A graduate of the École des Beaux-Arts, he has worked for the children's book and advertising industries. His work has appeared in the Beechwood Bunny Tales (La Famille Passiflore) series by Geneviève Huriet, as well as Claude Clément's Les Pataclous.

Jouannigot was a silent partner with another French-born illustrator, Michel Plessix, in recent artwork for Kenneth Grahame's The Wind in the Willows.
