= Geneviève Huriet =

French author (born 1927)

- Born: 24 August 1927 (age 99); France
- Occupation: Writer
- Children: 4
- Writing career
- Period: 1984–present
- Genre: Children's literature
- Notable works: Beechwood Bunny Tales (La Famille Passiflore)

Geneviève Huriet (born 24 August 1927) is a French author, known for the Beechwood Bunny Tales (La Famille Passiflore) children's book series. Huriet's works have been published by Éditions Milan, Grasset Jeunesse and Albin Michel in her native country, and a French-Canadian TV show based on the Beechwood books was launched in 2001. Only the first seven Beechwood stories have seen English translations from Gareth Stevens (in 1991 and 1992).

Huriet once worked as a librarian, and began writing for her nine grandchildren before launching her career. She lives in Paris with her diplomat husband and four children, and has travelled abroad in Japan, Britain, Angola and elsewhere.
