= Rob Edwards (screenwriter) =

American screenwriter

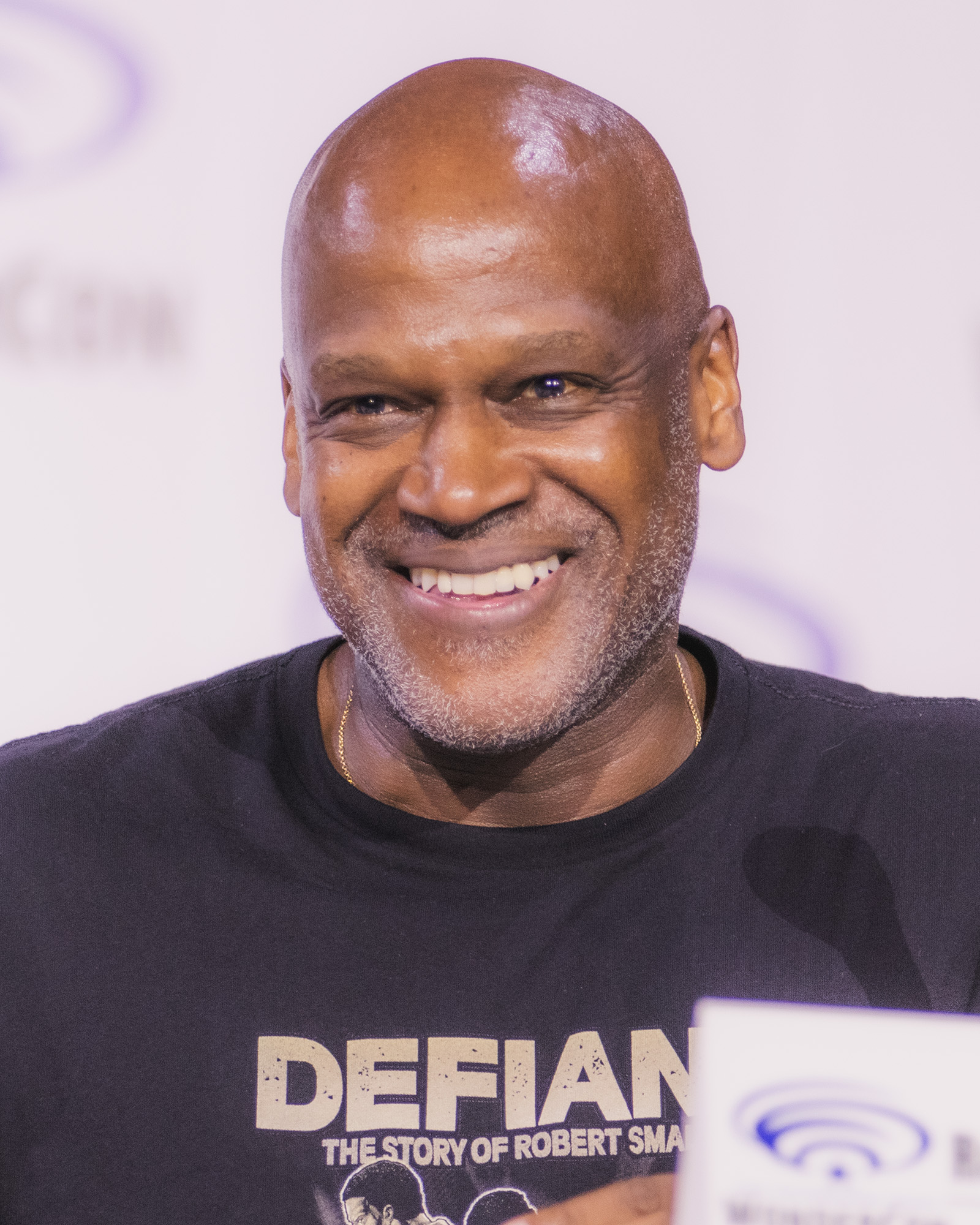
- Edwards in 2026
- Born: March 29, 1963 (age 63); Detroit, Michigan
- Notable work: The Princess and the Frog; Treasure Planet; Captain America: Brave New World
- Spouse: Michele
- Children: 2

Rob Edwards (born June 22, 1963) is an American television and feature film screenwriter and producer. His writing includes the Disney animated feature films Treasure Planet and The Princess and the Frog, both of which were nominated for the Academy Award for Best Animated Feature. In 2009, along with Ron Clements and John Musker, Edwards was awarded the Best Screenplay award from the African-American Film Critics Association for The Princess and the Frog.

== Early career ==
After graduating from the Cranbrook Schools in Bloomfield Hills, Michigan, Edwards attended Syracuse University's College of Visual and Performing Arts in the Transmedia Department. He also serves on the Cranbrook Schools Board of Governors.

Edwards moved to Los Angeles following graduation and gained success as a television writer. After writing for the long-running ABC-TV series Full House, Edwards went on to become a writer, story editor, and consultant for several prime time series including Bill Cosby's A Different World and the Golden Globe nominated The Fresh Prince of Bel-Air.

Edwards was also an Emmy Award nominee for the long-running sketch comedy show In Living Color.

Edwards is also credited with creating the NBC sitcom Out All Night which starred Patti LaBelle, Morris Chestnut and Vivica A. Fox. Throughout the 1990s, Edwards wrote and produced for television networks and on series including Roc, The Parent 'Hood, and In the House.

== Film ==
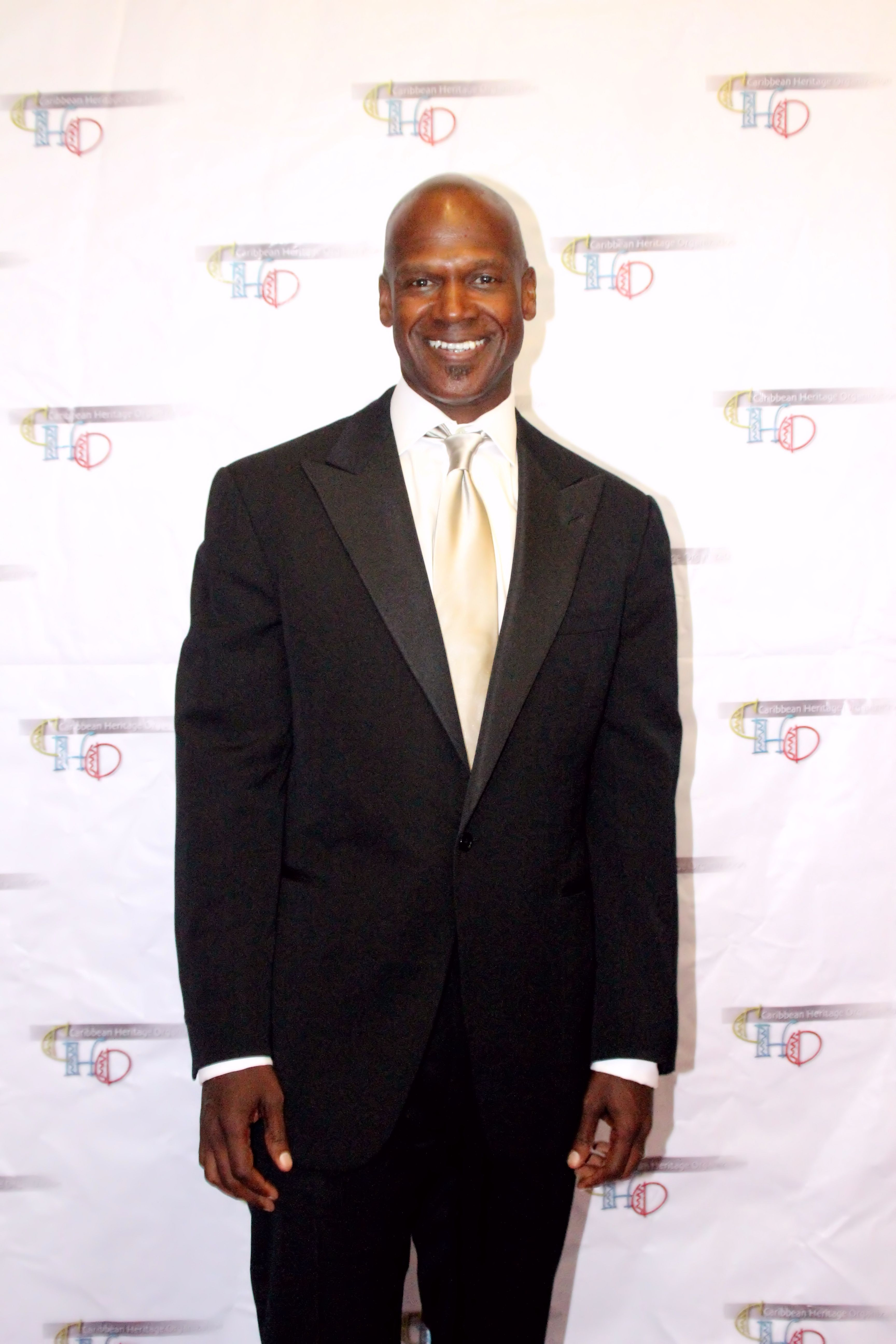
Edwards at the CHO Awards Dinner in 2016

Edwards next shifted his focus to feature films and joined Walt Disney Animation Studios as a writer. His first film, Treasure Planet, was released in 2002 and starred a voice cast that included Joseph Gordon-Levitt, Martin Short, Emma Thompson, Patrick McGoohan, as well as famed voice-over actors Corey Burton and Tony Jay. Though the film fared poorly at the box office, it was a critical success for Edwards and went on to earn eight Annie Award nominations and an Academy Award nomination for Best Animated Feature.

Edwards returned to the screen with 2009's The Princess and the Frog, a critical and box office success. The film was nominated for three Oscars, including Best Animated Feature Oscar.

On both films, Edwards worked with the Disney Animation team of Ron Clements and John Musker (The Little Mermaid). In 2011, Variety reported that Edwards was collaborating on projects with producers Robert Zemeckis, Bob Cooper, Jack Rapke and with Will Smith, Dan Fogelman, and Reggie Hudlin. In June 2021, Edwards was announced to write the script and make his directorial debut on the animated film Sneaks.

== Filmography ==
| Year | Title | Credit | Director(s) |
|---|---|---|---|
| 2001 | WaSanGo | executive producer | Tae-gyun Kim |
| 2002 | Treasure Planet | writer (screenplay) | Ron Clements, John Musker |
| 2009 | The Princess and the Frog | writer (screenplay), actor (voice) | Ron Clements, John Musker |
| 2025 | Captain America: Brave New World | writer (screenplay and story) | Julius Onah |
| 2025 | Sneaks | writer (screenplay), director | Himself, Christopher Jenkins |
| 2025 | An Animated American | writer (screenplay) | TBD |
| Amulet | writer (screenplay) | TBD | |

=== Television ===
- Better Days (1986)
- Full House (1988)
- A Different World (1988–89)
- The Marshall Chronicles (1990)
- In Living Color (1990–92)
- The Fresh Prince of Bel-Air (1990–91)
- Out All Night (1992–93)
- Roc (1993–94)
- The Parent 'Hood (1995)
- The Naked Truth (1995–96)
- In the House (1996–97)
