= List of accolades received by Lost in Translation =

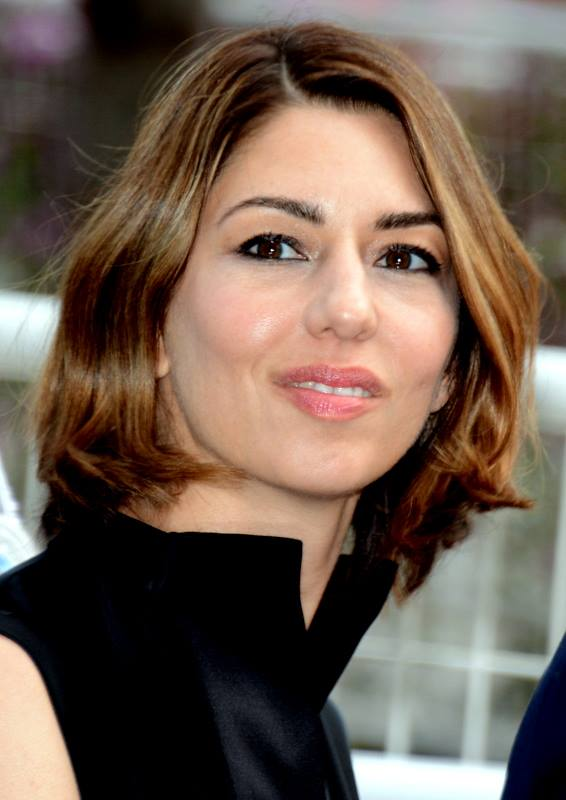
- Sofia Coppola received many awards and nominations for her directing and writing, including the Academy Award for Best Original Screenplay.
Accolades
Award	Won	Nominated
Academy Awards	1	4
African-American Film Critics Association	1	1
American Cinema Editors	0	1
American Film Institute	1	1
American Screenwriters Association	0	1
ADG Awards	0	1
Australian Film Institute	0	1
British Academy Film Awards	3	8
Bangkok International Film Festival	0	1
Bodil Awards	1	1
Boston Society of Film Critics	3	5
Chicago Film Critics Association	3	6
César Awards	1	1
Círculo de Escritores Cinematográficos	0	1
Critics' Choice Movie Awards	1	6
Dallas–Fort Worth Film Critics Association	1	1
David di Donatello	0	1
Deutscher Filmpreis	1	1
Directors Guild of America Awards	0	1
Directors Guild of Great Britain	0	1
European Film Awards	0	1
Film Critics Circle of Australia	1	1
Florida Film Critics Circle	1	1
French Syndicate of Cinema Critics	1	1
Golden Globe Awards	3	5
Golden Trailer Awards	1	1
Guldbagge Awards	0	1
Independent Spirit Awards	4	4
Irish Film & Television Academy	0	4
Nastro d'Argento	1	1
London Film Critics' Circle	0	1
Los Angeles Film Critics Association	2	3
MTV Movie Awards	0	2
National Board of Review	2	2
National Society of Film Critics	1	4
New York Film Critics Circle	2	3
New York Film Critics Online	5	5
Online Film Critics Society	2	6
Palm Springs International Film Festival	1	1
Robert Awards	1	0
San Francisco Film Critics Circle	2	2
Satellite Awards	3	5
Screen Actors Guild Awards	0	1
São Paulo International Film Festival	1	1
Seminci	2	2
Toronto Film Critics Association	1	1
U.S. Comedy Arts Festival	4	4
Vancouver Film Critics Circle	1	1
Venice International Film Festival	2	2
Washington D.C. Area Film Critics Association	2	2
Writers Guild of America Awards	1	1
- Total number of awards and nominations (Note: Certain award groups do not simply award one winner. They recognize several different recipients and have finalists. For simplicity, finalist mentions are considered to be nominations in this awards tally.)
Totals	64	113
- Footnotes

Lost in Translation is a 2003 comedy-drama film written and directed by Sofia Coppola. The film focuses on the relationship between a washed-up movie star, Bob Harris (Bill Murray), and a recent college graduate in an unhappy marriage, Charlotte (Scarlett Johansson), over the course of one week in Tokyo. The film also features Giovanni Ribisi and Anna Faris in supporting roles. The film featured an original score by Kevin Shields and Brian Reitzell and cinematography by Lance Acord; it was edited by Sarah Flack. Lost in Translation premiered at the Telluride Film Festival in 2003. Focus Features gave the film a limited release on September 12, 2003, before a wide release on October 3. It grossed a worldwide total of over $119 million on a production budget of $4 million. Review aggregator Rotten Tomatoes surveyed 222 reviews and judged 95% of them to be positive.

Lost in Translation received awards and nominations in a variety of categories, particularly for Coppola's direction and screenwriting as well as the lead acting performances from Murray and Johansson. At the 76th Academy Awards, it won Best Original Screenplay (Coppola) and the film received three further nominations—Best Picture, Best Director (Coppola), and Best Actor (Murray). The film garnered three Golden Globe Awards from five nominations; Best Motion Picture – Musical or Comedy, Best Actor – Motion Picture Musical or Comedy, and Best Screenplay. At the 57th British Academy Film Awards, Lost in Translation won three awards; Best Actor in a Leading Role, Best Actress in a Leading Role (Johansson), and Best Editing.

Lost in Translation also received awards from various foreign award ceremonies, film festivals, and critics' organizations. Among others, the film won Best American Film at the Bodil Awards, Best Foreign Film at the César Awards, and Best Foreign Film at the Film Critics Circle of Australia, French Syndicate of Cinema Critics, and Deutscher Filmpreis as well as the Nastro d'Argento for Best Foreign Director. The film also won the Independent Spirit Award for Best Film, Best Film – Comedy or Musical at the Satellite Awards, and two prizes at the Venice International Film Festival. In terms of critics' organizations, Lost in Translation received awards in the Best Film category from the San Francisco Film Critics Circle, the Toronto Film Critics Association, and the Vancouver Film Critics Circle.

== Accolades ==
Award	Date of ceremony	Category	Recipient(s)	Result	Ref
Academy Awards	February 29, 2004	Best Picture	Sofia Coppola and Ross Katz	Nominated	
Academy Awards	February 29, 2004	Best Director	Sofia Coppola	Nominated	
Academy Awards	February 29, 2004	Best Actor	Bill Murray	Nominated	
Academy Awards	February 29, 2004	Best Original Screenplay	Sofia Coppola	Won	
African-American Film Critics Association	December 22, 2003	Top Ten Films	Lost in Translation	Won	
American Cinema Editors	February 15, 2004	Best Edited Feature Film – Comedy or Musical	Sarah Flack	Nominated	
American Film Institute	N/A	Top Ten Films	Lost in Translation	Won	
American Screenwriters Association	February 8, 2004	Discover Screenwriting Award	Sofia Coppola	Nominated	
ADG Awards	February 14, 2004	Excellence in Production Design for a Contemporary Film	K. K. Barrett, Anne Ross, Mayumi Tomita, and Rika Nakanishi	Nominated	
Australian Film Institute Awards	October 29, 2004	Best Foreign Film	Sofia Coppola and Ross Katz	Nominated	
British Academy Film Awards	February 14, 2004	Best Film	Sofia Coppola and Ross Katz	Nominated	
British Academy Film Awards	February 14, 2004	Best Direction	Sofia Coppola	Nominated	
British Academy Film Awards	February 14, 2004	Best Actor in a Leading Role	Bill Murray	Won	
British Academy Film Awards	February 14, 2004	Best Actress in a Leading Role	Scarlett Johansson	Won	
British Academy Film Awards	February 14, 2004	Best Original Screenplay	Sofia Coppola	Nominated	
British Academy Film Awards	February 14, 2004	Best Editing	Sarah Flack	Won	
British Academy Film Awards	February 14, 2004	Best Cinematography	Lance Acord	Nominated	
British Academy Film Awards	February 14, 2004	Best Film Music	Kevin Shields and Brian Reitzell	Nominated	
Bangkok International Film Festival	February 2, 2004	Golden Kinnaree Award for Best Film	Sofia Coppola	Nominated	
Bodil Awards	February 27, 2005	Best American Film	Sofia Coppola	Won	
Boston Society of Film Critics	December 14, 2003	Best Film	Lost in Translation	2nd Place	
Boston Society of Film Critics	December 14, 2003	Best Director	Sofia Coppola	Won	
Boston Society of Film Critics	December 14, 2003	Best Actor	Bill Murray	Won	
Boston Society of Film Critics	December 14, 2003	Best Actress	Scarlett Johansson	Won	
Boston Society of Film Critics	December 14, 2003	Best Screenplay	Sofia Coppola	Nominated	
Chicago Film Critics Association	January 21, 2004	Best Film	Lost in Translation	Nominated	
Chicago Film Critics Association	January 21, 2004	Best Director	Sofia Coppola	Nominated	
Chicago Film Critics Association	January 21, 2004	Best Actor	Bill Murray	Won	
Chicago Film Critics Association	January 21, 2004	Best Actress	Scarlett Johansson	Nominated	
Chicago Film Critics Association	January 21, 2004	Best Screenplay	Sofia Coppola	Won	
Chicago Film Critics Association	January 21, 2004	Best Cinematography	Lance Acord	Won	
César Awards	February 26, 2005	Best Foreign Film	Lost in Translation	Won	
Círculo de Escritores Cinematográficos	January 24, 2005	Best Foreign Film	Lost in Translation	Nominated	
Critics' Choice Movie Awards	January 10, 2004	Top Ten Films	Lost in Translation	Won	
Critics' Choice Movie Awards	January 10, 2004	Best Picture	Lost in Translation	Nominated	
Critics' Choice Movie Awards	January 10, 2004	Best Director	Sofia Coppola	Nominated	
Critics' Choice Movie Awards	January 10, 2004	Best Actor	Bill Murray	Nominated	
Critics' Choice Movie Awards	January 10, 2004	Best Supporting Actress	Scarlett Johansson	Nominated	
Critics' Choice Movie Awards	January 10, 2004	Best Screenplay	Sofia Coppola	Nominated	
Dallas–Fort Worth Film Critics Association	January 5, 2004	Top Ten Films	Lost in Translation	Won	
David di Donatello	April 14, 2004	Best Foreign Film	Sofia Coppola	Nominated	
Deutscher Filmpreis	June 18, 2004	Best Foreign Film	Sofia Coppola	Won	
Directors Guild of America Awards	February 7, 2004	Outstanding Directing – Feature Film	Sofia Coppola	Nominated	
Directors Guild of Great Britain	February 21, 2004	Outstanding Directorial Achievement in International Film	Sofia Coppola	Nominated	
European Film Awards	December 11, 2004	Screen International Award	Sofia Coppola	Nominated	
Film Critics Circle of Australia	November 7, 2004	Best Foreign Film–English Language	Sofia Coppola	Won	
Florida Film Critics Circle	January 2, 2004	Best Screenplay	Sofia Coppola	Won	
French Syndicate of Cinema Critics	February 14, 2005	Best Foreign Film	Sofia Coppola	Won	
Golden Eagle Award	January 29, 2005	Best Foreign Language Film	Lost in Translation	Nominated	
Golden Globe Awards	January 25, 2004	Best Motion Picture – Musical or Comedy	Lost in Translation	Won	
Golden Globe Awards	January 25, 2004	Best Director – Motion Picture	Sofia Coppola	Nominated	
Golden Globe Awards	January 25, 2004	Best Actor – Motion Picture Musical or Comedy	Bill Murray	Won	
Golden Globe Awards	January 25, 2004	Best Actress – Motion Picture Musical or Comedy	Scarlett Johansson	Nominated	
Golden Globe Awards	January 25, 2004	Best Screenplay	Sofia Coppola	Won	
Golden Trailer Awards	May 25, 2004	Best Independent Film	Lost in Translation	Won	
Guldbagge Awards	January 24, 2005	Best Foreign Film	Sofia Coppola	Nominated	
Independent Spirit Awards	February 28, 2004	Best Film	Sofia Coppola and Ross Katz	Won	
Independent Spirit Awards	February 28, 2004	Best Director	Sofia Coppola	Won	
Independent Spirit Awards	February 28, 2004	Best Male Lead	Bill Murray	Won	
Independent Spirit Awards	February 28, 2004	Best Screenplay	Sofia Coppola	Won	
Irish Film & Television Academy	October 30, 2004	Best International Film	Lost in Translation	Nominated	
Irish Film & Television Academy	October 30, 2004	Best International Actor	Bill Murray	Nominated	
Irish Film & Television Academy	October 30, 2004	Best International Actress	Scarlett Johansson	Nominated	
Irish Film & Television Academy	October 30, 2004	Best Music	Kevin Shields	Nominated	
Nastro d'Argento	June 19, 2004	Best Foreign Director	Sofia Coppola	Won	
London Film Critics' Circle	February 11, 2004	Actor of the Year	Bill Murray	Nominated	
Los Angeles Film Critics Association	January 7, 2004	Best Film	Lost in Translation	2nd Place	
Los Angeles Film Critics Association	January 7, 2004	Best Actor	Bill Murray	Won	
Los Angeles Film Critics Association	January 7, 2004	New Generation Award	Scarlett Johansson	Won	
MTV Movie Awards	June 5, 2004	Best Male Performance	Bill Murray	Nominated	
MTV Movie Awards	June 5, 2004	Best Breakthrough Female	Scarlett Johansson	Nominated	
National Board of Review	December 3, 2003	Top Ten Films	Lost in Translation	Won	
National Board of Review	December 3, 2003	Special Achievement in Filmmaking	Sofia Coppola	Won	
National Society of Film Critics	January 3, 2004	Best Film	Lost in Translation	3rd Place	
National Society of Film Critics	January 3, 2004	Best Director	Sofia Coppola	3rd Place	
National Society of Film Critics	January 3, 2004	Best Actor	Bill Murray	Won	
National Society of Film Critics	January 3, 2004	Best Cinematography	Lance Acord	2nd Place	
New York Film Critics Circle	December 15, 2003	Best Director	Sofia Coppola	Won	
New York Film Critics Circle	December 15, 2003	Best Actor	Bill Murray	Won	
New York Film Critics Circle	December 15, 2003	Best Screenplay	Sofia Coppola	3rd Place	
New York Film Critics Online	December 15, 2003	Top Films of the Year	Lost in Translation	Won	
New York Film Critics Online	December 15, 2003	Best Film	Lost in Translation	Won	
New York Film Critics Online	December 15, 2003	Best Director	Sofia Coppola	Won	
New York Film Critics Online	December 15, 2003	Best Actor	Bill Murray	Won	
New York Film Critics Online	December 15, 2003	Best Supporting Actress	Scarlett Johansson	Won	
Online Film Critics Society	January 5, 2004	Best Picture	Lost in Translation	Nominated	
Online Film Critics Society	January 5, 2004	Best Director	Sofia Coppola	Nominated	
Online Film Critics Society	January 5, 2004	Best Actor	Bill Murray	Won	
Online Film Critics Society	January 5, 2004	Best Actress	Scarlett Johansson	Nominated	
Online Film Critics Society	January 5, 2004	Best Original Screenplay	Sofia Coppola	Won	
Online Film Critics Society	January 5, 2004	Best Original Score	Brian Reitzell and Kevin Shields	Nominated	
Palm Springs International Film Festival	January 19, 2004	Rising Star Award	Scarlett Johansson (also for Girl with a Pearl Earring)	Won	
Robert Awards	16 January 2005	Best English Language Film	Lost in Translation	Won	
San Francisco Film Critics Circle	December 15, 2003	Best Film	Lost in Translation	Won	
San Francisco Film Critics Circle	December 15, 2003	Best Actor	Bill Murray	Won	
Satellite Awards	January 23, 2004	Best Film – Comedy or Musical	Lost in Translation	Won	
Satellite Awards	January 23, 2004	Best Director	Sofia Coppola	Nominated	
Satellite Awards	January 23, 2004	Best Actor – Motion Picture, Comedy or Musical	Bill Murray	Won	
Satellite Awards	January 23, 2004	Best Supporting Actress – Motion Picture, Comedy or Musical	Scarlett Johansson	Nominated	
Satellite Awards	January 23, 2004	Best Original Screenplay	Sofia Coppola	Won	
Screen Actors Guild Awards	February 22, 2004	Outstanding Performance by a Male Actor in a Leading Role	Bill Murray	Nominated	
São Paulo International Film Festival	October 30, 2003	Best in Competition	Sofia Coppola	Won	
Seminci	November 1, 2003	Best New Director	Sofia Coppola	Won	
Seminci	November 1, 2003	FIPRESCI Prize	Sofia Coppola	Won	
Toronto Film Critics Association	December 17, 2003	Best Film	Lost in Translation	Won	
U.S. Comedy Arts Festival	July 8, 2004	Audience Award	Lost in Translation	Won	
U.S. Comedy Arts Festival	July 8, 2004	Best First-Time Comedy Director	Sofia Coppola	Won	
U.S. Comedy Arts Festival	July 8, 2004	Best Screenplay	Sofia Coppola	Won	
U.S. Comedy Arts Festival	July 8, 2004	Best Performance in a Comedy Film	Bill Murray	Won	
Vancouver Film Critics Circle	February 2, 2004	Best Film	Lost in Translation	Won	
Venice International Film Festival	September 6, 2003	Lina Mangiacapre Award	Sofia Coppola	Won	
Venice International Film Festival	September 6, 2003	Upstream Prize for Best Actress	Scarlett Johansson	Won	
Washington D.C. Area Film Critics Association	December 19, 2003	Best Actor	Bill Murray	Won	
Washington D.C. Area Film Critics Association	December 19, 2003	Best Original Screenplay	Sofia Coppola	Won	
Writers Guild of America Awards	February 21, 2004	Best Original Screenplay	Sofia Coppola	Won	

== See also ==
- 2003 in film
