= African-American Film Critics Association Awards 2009 =

Annual US film awards ceremony

7th African-American Film Critics Association Awards
- Date: December 14, 2009

Highlights
- Best Picture: Precious

The African-American Film Critics Association Awards 2009, honoring the best in filmmaking of 2009, were given on December 14, 2009.

== Top 10 Films ==
1. Precious
2. The Princess and the Frog
3. Up in the Air
4. The Hurt Locker
5. This Is It
6. American Violet
7. Goodbye Solo
8. Medicine for Melancholy
9. Good Hair
10. Up

== Winners ==
- Best Actor:
  - Morgan Freeman - Invictus
- Best Actress:
  - Nicole Beharie - American Violet
- Best Director:
  - Lee Daniels - Precious
- Best Picture:
  - Precious
- Best Screenplay: (tie)
  - Precious - Geoffrey S. Fletcher
  - The Princess and the Frog - Ron Clements, Rob Edwards, and John Musker
- Best Supporting Actor:
  - Anthony Mackie - The Hurt Locker
- Best Supporting Actress:
  - Mo'Nique - Precious
