= African-American Film Critics Association Awards 2004 =

Annual US film awards ceremony

2nd African-American Film Critics Association Awards
- Date: December 28, 2004

Highlights
- Best Picture: Ray

The 2nd African-American Film Critics Association Awards, honoring the best in filmmaking of 2004, were given on 28 December 2004.

== Top 10 Films ==
1. Ray
2. Hotel Rwanda
3. Finding Neverland
4. The Aviator
5. Sideways
6. Baadasssss!
7. Brother to Brother
8. Woman Thou Art Loosed
9. Million Dollar Baby
10. Collateral

== Winners ==
- Achievement Honor:
  - Jamie Foxx
