= Baadasssss! =

2003 film by Mario Van Peebles

- Theatrical release poster
- Directed by: Mario Van Peebles
- Written by: Mario Van Peebles; Dennis Haggerty
- Based on: Sweet Sweetback's Baadasssss Song: A Guerilla Filmmaking Manifesto by Melvin Van Peebles
- Produced by: Mario Van Peebles
- Starring: Mario Van Peebles; David Alan Grier; Nia Long; Rainn Wilson; Terry Crews
- Cinematography: Robert Primes
- Edited by: Anthony Miller; Nneka Goforth
- Music by: Tyler Bates
- Production companies: Bad Aaas Cinema; MVP Films; Showtime Independent Films
- Distributed by: Sony Pictures Classics
- Release dates: September 7, 2003 (Toronto International Film Festival); May 28, 2004
- Running time: 108 minutes
- Country: United States
- Language: English
- Box office: $365,727

Baadasssss! is a 2003 American biographical drama film, written, produced, directed by, and starring Mario Van Peebles. The film is based on the struggles of Van Peebles' father Melvin Van Peebles (played by Mario himself), as he attempts to film and distribute Sweet Sweetback's Baadasssss Song, a film that was widely credited with showing Hollywood that a viable African-American audience existed, and thus influencing the creation of the blaxploitation genre. The film also stars Joy Bryant, Nia Long, Ossie Davis, Paul Rodriguez, Rainn Wilson, and Terry Crews.

== Plot ==
A mock documentary opens the film with the actors (in character as the production crew members) reflecting on the tumultuous events of the 1960s. As the Vietnam War continues, stereotypical depictions of Black Americans in cinema persist.

In 1970, Melvin Van Peebles, who had finished Watermelon Man for Columbia Pictures, contemplates his next film project. Peebles' talent agent Howie Kaufman advises him to follow up with a comedy. After brainstorming in the Mojave Desert, Peebles outlines his vision for the film, which includes that the film must be entertaining, commercially viable, and represent the Black community.

Titling his project Sweet Sweetback's Baadasssss Song, Peebles sends a story treatment to Kaufman who questions the story's anti-police themes. Peebles' friend Bill Harris agrees to arrange the financing but declines Peebles' request to have the unionized film crew be 50 percent Black. Sometime later, Peebles watches an adult film produced by Clyde Houston. At an ADR session, Houston agrees to join the film as a production manager. Harris finds one investor named Bert, who agrees to finance the film. However, Peebles withdraws from the offer after Bert exposes himself near his house pool.

At a nightclub, Peebles and Harris meet Donovan, a hippie, who agrees to finance the film. On the studio lot, Peebles auditions several actors for the title role. Despite not being hired, Peebles hires them for supporting acting roles. He later hires "Big T", a crew member who works as the sound assistant and head of security. Peebles' secretary Priscilla, who has turned every situation into an audition, is given a role in the film. When Peebles has assembled his crew, he learns Donovan has been arrested, which threatens the production that has only raised over $72,000. Before filming begins, Peebles casts himself in the lead role. Priscilla however decides to back out of production because her boyfriend does not approve. She is recast by Ginnie, whom Peebles had met at Donovan's party.

Deciding to go independent, Peebles tricks the Screen Actors Guild (SAG) into believing the film is a porno. To save on cost, Peebles films certain scenes on 16 mm and casts his son Mario in the film. This causes an argument with Sandra, Peebles' girlfriend, who finds Mario's participation in the film to be inappropriate. On set, Priscilla's boyfriend Maurice White asks Peebles to compose the score to help promote his then-unknown group Earth, Wind & Fire.

As filming continues, Peebles learns his production crew have been arrested for alleged grand theft. To help finish the picture, Bill Cosby loans $50,000, which Peebles partially uses to help bail out his crew members. With three days left, "Big T" threatens to leave the production, but Peebles convinces him to stay because of the film's potential significance to the community. During post-production, Harris hires an editor, and Earth, Wind & Fire records the soundtrack. While editing, Peebles receives a threatening phone call, demanding their loans be repaid immediately. Under immense pressure, Peebles disregards his eye infection, and finishes the final cut.

Peebles tries to sell the film to distributors, but they decline. Kaufman arranges Peebles to meet with Jerry Gross of Cinemation Industries, who initially cautions about marketing the film. Gross eventually agrees to distribute, and Peebles meets with twin theater owners, Manny and Mort Goldberg. They agree to screen the film but it fails to find an audience. Before they pull the film, participants of the Black Panther Party arrive to see the film. Before long, Sweet Sweetback's Baadasssss Song becomes the highest-grossing independent film of 1971, and the soundtrack becomes a success.

== Cast ==
- Mario Van Peebles as Melvin Van Peebles
  - Melvin as himself also appears in a cameo.
- Adam West as Bert, one of the first investors Melvin meets to finance his film.
- David Alan Grier as Clyde Houston
- Glenn Plummer as Angry Brother
- John Singleton as "Detroit J"
- Joy Bryant as Priscilla, Melvin's young, ambitious secretary.
- Karimah Westbrook as Ginnie
- Khalil Kain as Maurice, Priscilla's boyfriend, and a member of the then-fledgling R&B group Earth, Wind & Fire.
- Khleo Thomas as Mario Van Peebles, who portrayed Sweetback as a child in the 1971 film.
- Len Lesser as Manny and Mort Goldberg, twin theater owners who agree to screen the film.
- Nia Long as Sandra, Melvin's girlfriend
- Ossie Davis as "Granddad", Melvin's grandfather who looks after his children and appears in a minor role.
- Paul Rodriguez as Jose Garcia, a Puerto Rican cameraman.
- Penny Bae Bridges as Megan Van Peebles, one of Melvin's children, acting in a minor role in the film.
- Rainn Wilson as Bill Harris, Melvin's friend who tries but fails to acquire financial backing for the film.
- Saul Rubinek as Howie Kaufman, Melvin's agent.
- Terry Crews as "Big T", crew member that acts as sound assistant and security for the crew.
- T. K. Carter as Bill Cosby
  - Cosby as himself also appears in a cameo.
- Vincent Schiavelli as Jerry Gross, the founder of Cinemation Industries.
- Wesley Jonathan as a Black Panther member.

== Reception ==
The film received mostly positive reviews. On the review aggregator website Rotten Tomatoes, 91% of 109 critics' reviews are positive, with an average rating of 7.4/10. The website's consensus reads: "An entertaining and intriguing tribute to a father from his son." Metacritic, which uses a weighted average, assigned the film a score of 75 out of 100, based on 33 critics, indicating "generally favorable" reviews. Roger Ebert of the Chicago Sun-Times named it one of the best films of the year. Baadasssss! was nominated for several "best of" Independent Spirit and NAACP Image awards for 2005, including best feature, director, actor and screenplay. It was listed in the African-American Film Critics Association's top-ten films of 2004 and won best feature film at the 2004 Philadelphia Film Festival. However, the film ended up being a commercial failure, making less than $400,000 at the box office during its limited theatrical release. Leonard Maltin lists the movie in his book 151 Best Movies You've Never Seen and he writes "Mario Van Peebles has written, directed, and starred in a number of films over the years but this is his most personal piece of work-and I think his best."

== Awards and nominations ==
2004 Gijón International Film Festival

- Best Feature – Mario Van Peebles (nominated)

2004 Philadelphia Film Festival

- Best Feature Film – Mario Van Peebles (winner)

2005 Black Reel Awards

- Best Actor, Drama – Mario Van Peebles (nominated)
- Best Director – Mario Van Pebbles (winner)
- Best Film, Drama (nominated)
- Best Screenplay, Original or Adapted – Mario Van Peebles (winner)
- Best Supporting Actress – Joy Bryant (nominated)

20th Independent Spirit Awards

- Best Director – Mario Van Peebles (nominated)
- Best Feature – Mario Van Peebles (nominated)
- Best Screenplay – Dennis Haggerty, Mario Van Peebles (nominated)

36th NAACP Image Awards

- Outstanding Actor in a Motion Picture – Mario Van Peebles (nominated)
- Outstanding Independent or Foreign Film (nominated)

== Soundtrack ==
A soundtrack album was released by the label Barely Breaking Even.

BAADASSSSS! Soundtrack

Soundtrack album by Various Artists
- Released: June 1, 2004
- Genre: Film soundtrack
- Length: 71:23
- Label: Barely Breaking Even

No.	Title	Performer(s)	Length
1.	"No Crew Has Ever Looked Like This (Dialogue)"		0:17
2.	"Main Title Score"	Baadasssss! Band	4:23
3.	"Breaking The Rules (Dialogue)"		0:09
4.	"Groove Me"	King Floyd	2:57
5.	"Get Down"	War	4:25
6.	"It's About A Brotha' (Dialogue)"		0:18
7.	"Lumumba"	Miriam Makeba	2:43
8.	"Just Do It" (featuring Pharoahe Monch)	Pete Rock	4:26
9.	"Gettin' the Man's Foot Outta' Your Ass"	Black Panther Fugitives	6:18
10.	"Back Up (Dialogue)"		0:27
11.	"Cou Cou"	Zap Mama	4:10
12.	"Che Che Cole Makossa" (featuring Myra Vega)	Antibalas Afrobeat Orchestra	4:03
13.	"Jeanie, It's Mel (Dialogue)"		0:50
14.	"I Came But..."	Zuco 103	3:46
15.	"Love"	Donn	2:48
16.	"How Much? (Dialogue)"		0:41
17.	"Sweetback's Theme"	Melvin Van Peebles	2:49
18.	"Lil' Money"	Eric Roberson	4:22
19.	"Green and Gold"	Rob Ayers	4:49
20.	"I'll Make You A Bet (Dialogue)"		0:30
21.	"Father and Son"	Baadasssss! Band	0:58
22.	"Caught in the Hustle"	Immortal Technique	3:42
23.	"Soul Brothers"	Baadasssss! Band	2:37
24.	"Look Around"	Jean Grae	4:49
25.	"Inspiration Walk"	Baadasssss! Band	4:06
