= African-American Film Critics Association Awards 2018 =

Annual US film awards ceremony

16th African-American Film Critics Association Awards
- Date: February 6, 2019

Highlights
- Best Picture: Black Panther
- Independent film: If Beale Street Could Talk
- Animation: Spider-Man: Into the Spider-Verse
- Documentary: Quincy
- Best Comedy Series: Insecure
- Best Drama Series: Queen Sugar

The 2018 African-American Film Critics Association Awards were announced on December 11, 2018, while the ceremony took place on February 6, 2019, at Taglyan Complex in Hollywood, California.

== Awards ==
=== AAFCA Top Ten Films ===
1. Black Panther (Walt Disney Studios)
2. If Beale Street Could Talk (Annapurna Pictures)
3. The Hate U Give (20th Century Fox)
4. A Star Is Born (Warner Bros. Studios)
5. Quincy (Netflix)
6. Roma (Netflix)
7. Blindspotting (Lionsgate)
8. The Favourite (Fox Searchlight Pictures)
9. Sorry to Bother You (Annapurna Pictures)
10. Widows (20th Century Fox)

=== AAFCA Regular Awards ===
Best Picture

- Black Panther

Best Director

- Ryan Coogler – Black Panther

Best Actor

- John David Washington – BlacKkKlansman

Best Actress

- Regina Hall – Support the Girls

Best Supporting Actor

- Russell Hornsby – The Hate U Give

Best Supporting Actress

- Regina King – If Beale Street Could Talk

Best Independent Film

- If Beale Street Could Talk

Best Screenplay

- Charlie Wachtel & David Rabinowitz and Kevin Willmott & Spike Lee – BlacKkKlansman

Breakout Performance

- Amandla Stenberg – The Hate U Give

Best Animated Film

- Spider-Man: Into the Spider-Verse

Best Documentary

- Quincy

Best Foreign Film

- Roma

Best Song

- "All the Stars" by Kendrick Lamar and SZA – Black Panther

Best TV Comedy

- Insecure

Best TV Drama

- Queen Sugar

Best New Media

- Red Table Talk

=== AAFCA Special Awards ===
AAFCA Special Achievement Award

- Tendo Nagenda, producer; Wesley Morris, film critic; Alana Mayo, producer; Kelly Edwards, executive; Crazy Rich Asians, honoree

== See also ==
- 2018 in film
