= African-American Film Critics Association Awards 2007 =

Annual US film awards ceremony

5th African-American Film Critics Association Awards
- Date: December 17, 2007

Highlights
- Best Picture: The Great Debaters

The African-American Film Critics Association is an organization that honors excellence in cinema, specifically focusing on African-American and minority films, filmmakers, and artists. The AAFCA Awards recognize outstanding achievements in various categories such as Best Picture, Best Director, Best Actor, Best Actress, and more.

== Top 10 Films ==
1. The Great Debaters
2. American Gangster
3. Talk to Me
4. Gone Baby Gone
5. No Country for Old Men
6. Michael Clayton
7. Juno
8. Sweeney Todd: The Demon Barber of Fleet Street
9. Things We Lost in the Fire
10. There Will Be Blood

== Winners ==
- Best Actor:
  - Don Cheadle – Talk to Me
- Best Actress:
  - Marion Cotillard – La Vie en rose
- Best Director:
  - Kasi Lemmons – Talk to Me
- Best Picture:
  - The Great Debaters
- Best Supporting Actor:
  - Chiwetel Ejiofor – Talk to Me
- Best Supporting Actress:
  - Ruby Dee – American Gangster
