= Treasure Planet =

2002 animated Disney film

- Theatrical release poster
- Directed by: John Musker; Ron Clements
- Screenplay by: Ron Clements; John Musker; Rob Edwards
- Story by: Ron Clements; John Musker; Ted Elliott; Terry Rossio
- Based on: Treasure Island by Robert Louis Stevenson
- Produced by: Roy Conli; John Musker; Ron Clements
- Starring: Joseph Gordon-Levitt; Brian Murray; Emma Thompson; David Hyde Pierce; Martin Short; Michael Wincott; Laurie Metcalf; Roscoe Lee Browne; Patrick McGoohan
- Narrated by: Tony Jay
- Edited by: Michael Kelly
- Music by: James Newton Howard
- Production company: Walt Disney Feature Animation
- Distributed by: Buena Vista Pictures Distribution (Note: Distributed under the Walt Disney Pictures banner.)
- Release dates: November 6, 2002 (Paris); November 27, 2002 (United States)
- Running time: 95 minutes
- Country: United States
- Language: English
- Budget: $140 million
- Box office: $109.6 million

Treasure Planet is a 2002 American animated adventure film directed by John Musker and Ron Clements and written by Musker, Clements and Rob Edwards. Produced by Walt Disney Feature Animation, it is a science fiction adaptation of Robert Louis Stevenson's novel Treasure Island (1883) and the third Disney adaptation of the novel, following Treasure Island (1950) and Muppet Treasure Island (1996). In the film's setting, spaceships are powered by solar sails and resemble the 18th-century sailing vessels of the original Treasure Island.

The film features the voices of Joseph Gordon-Levitt, Brian Murray, David Hyde Pierce, Martin Short, Roscoe Lee Browne, Emma Thompson, Michael Wincott, Laurie Metcalf, and Patrick McGoohan in his final role. The musical score was composed by James Newton Howard, with songs written and performed by John Rzeznik.

Clements and Musker pitched the concept for the film during production of The Little Mermaid (1989). Development began after they finished their work on Hercules (1997). It employs a novel technique of hand-drawn 2D traditional animation set atop 3D computer animation. With a budget of $140 million, it is the most expensive traditionally animated film to date.

Treasure Planet premiered in Paris on November 6, 2002, and was released in the United States on November 27 by Walt Disney Pictures. It was the first film to be released simultaneously in regular and IMAX theaters. The film was a box-office bomb, earning $109.6 million worldwide against a budget of $140 million, but received positive reviews from critics, and was nominated for Best Animated Feature at the 75th Academy Awards. Years after its release, it has since gained a cult following.

== Plot ==
Jim Hawkins lives on the planet Montressor, helping his mother Sarah operate the Benbow Inn. One day, a spaceship crashes near the establishment. A dying space pirate Billy Bones gives Jim a sphere and warns him to 'beware the cyborg'. Moments later, a vicious band of pirates raids and burns down the property. Jim flees with Sarah and their friend, astrophysicist Dr. Delbert Doppler. At Doppler's observatory, they discover that the sphere contains a holographic star map leading to the location of the fabled Treasure Planet, where Captain Flint hid his treasure years ago. Eager to rebuild his mother's inn, Jim convinces Doppler to finance an expedition.

At the Montressor Spaceport, Doppler commissions the ship RLS Legacy, commanded by the feline Captain Amelia and the stone-skinned first mate, Mr. Arrow. Captain Amelia assigns Jim to work in the ship's galley under the supervision of cook, Silver and his shape-shifting pet, Morph. Noticing the cybernetics on Silver, Jim suspects he is the cyborg Bones warned him about. During the voyage, Silver and Jim form a tenuous father-son relationship. The ship encounters a supernova devolving into a black hole. Jim secures the crew's lifelines, but a ruthless arachnid crew member named Scroop secretly cuts Mr. Arrow's lifeline, sending him falling into the black hole to his death. After the Legacy escapes the black hole, Scroop blames Jim for improperly securing Arrow's lifeline. Realizing the truth, Silver comforts the guilt-stricken Jim, giving him an inspiring speech to believe in his own greatness.

As the ship arrives at Treasure Planet, Jim accidentally eavesdrops on Silver and the crew, revealing that the crew are pirates and Silver is their ringleader, who plans to stage a mutiny. Jim is discovered by Silver, but evades him and runs to the deck to warn Captain Amelia. With the pirates in pursuit, Jim takes the map and flees with Doppler and Amelia to the planet's surface using an escape pod, though Amelia is severely injured in the crash. Jim soon realizes the map he has is actually Morph in disguise, with the real map left behind on the ship. On the planet, Jim meets B.E.N., a robot missing his primary memory circuit who used to be Flint's personal navigator. Jim uses B.E.N.'s home as a hideout for Doppler and the injured Amelia. Later, Jim, B.E.N., and Morph enter a secret shortcut near the pirates' camp and use their pod to sneak back onto the Legacy to retrieve the map. However, Jim is discovered by the lookout, Mr. Scroop, who attacks the teenager across the ship. B.E.N. inadvertently disables the artificial gravity, allowing Jim to kick Scroop overboard into deep space to his death.

Returning to B.E.N.'s hideout, the trio discovers that the pirates have taken Amelia and Doppler hostage, demanding the map as ransom. Silver forces Jim to lead the crew to the center of the planet where they uncover a massive teleportation portal capable of opening to any corner of the universe, the very mechanism Flint used to conduct his raids. Jim realizes that the entire planet is a giant piece of ancient alien machinery with the treasure buried in the treasure chamber located in the core.

The crew enters the chamber and begins collecting the loot. Jim finds Flint's skeleton, holding B.E.N.'s missing circuit. After Jim re-installs the circuit, B.E.N. remembers a horrifying truth: Flint rigged the planet to self-destruct if anyone discovers the treasure. The planet begins to collapse on itself. Silver attempts to escape with a boatload of treasure he has sought his entire life, but abandons it to save Jim. The survivors return to the Legacy, which becomes damaged by flying debris, leaving the ship without enough power to clear the planet's destruction. Jim rigs a makeshift sailboard and rides ahead, setting the coordinates to Montressor Spaceport on the portal's mechanism just as the planet completely blows up, safely teleporting the ship and the crew.

To avoid being arrested for piracy, Silver slips away and prepares to make his escape. Jim finds Silver, but allows him to leave due to their friendship. As a farewell gift, Silver gives Jim and Morph a handful of treasure he had salvaged from Flint's hoard before sailing away into the stars. Back on Montressor, Jim uses the treasure to help Sarah rebuild their inn, where B.E.N. becomes a waiter. Doppler and Amelia fall in love, marry and start a family. Now a mature and confidant man, Jim accepts Amelia's offer to become a cadet at the Interstellar Academy. He celebrates his acceptance, looks up at the sky and sees an image of Silver in the clouds.

== Voice cast ==
- Joseph Gordon-Levitt as James Pleiades "Jim" Hawkins, an adolescent adventurer.
  - Austin Majors as young Jim
- Brian Murray as "Long" John Silver, a cyborg bear-like alien who makes Jim thrive under his guidance, even though he leads the mutiny on the RLS Legacy.
- David Hyde Pierce as Dr. Delbert Doppler, a canine astronomer. He is a combination of Dr. Livesey and Squire Trelawney from Treasure Island.
- Emma Thompson as Captain Amelia, the feline captain of the RLS Legacy. She is an analog to Captain Alexander Smollett in Treasure Island.
- Martin Short as Bio-Electronic Navigator (B.E.N.), an alien robot who has lost his memory and was abandoned on Treasure Planet by Captain Flint. His name is a reference to Treasure Island's Ben Gunn, on whom he is based.
- Roscoe Lee Browne as Mr. Arrow, Captain Amelia's first mate.
- Laurie Metcalf as Sarah Hawkins, Jim Hawkins' mother who runs the Benbow Inn.
- Dane Davis as Morph, a small pink alien who can morph into any form. He is comparable to the pet parrot owned by Silver in the original Treasure Island.
- Michael Wincott as Scroop, a vicious spider-like crewman on the RLS Legacy. He is a rough analog to Israel Hands in Treasure Island.
- Patrick McGoohan as Billy Bones, a sailor who owned the map to Treasure Planet.
- Tony Jay as the narrator
- Peter Cullen as Captain Nathaniel Flint
- Jane Carr as Mrs. Dunwitty
- Corey Burton as Onus and Narrator (adult Jim, original prologue)
- Mike McShane as Hands

== Production ==
=== Development ===
Treasure Planet took roughly four and a half years to create, but the concept (which was called Treasure Island in Space at the time) was originally pitched by Ron Clements in 1985 at the "Gong Show" meeting wherein he and John Musker also pitched The Little Mermaid. The pitch was rejected by Michael Eisner, who knew Paramount Pictures was developing a Star Trek sequel with a Treasure Island angle (which eventually went unproduced). The idea was pitched again in 1989 following the release of The Little Mermaid, but the studio still expressed a lack of interest. Following the release of Aladdin, the idea was pitched for a third time, but Jeffrey Katzenberg, who was the chief of Walt Disney Studios at the time, "just wasn't interested" in the idea. During this time Katzenberg wanted the duo to work on A Princess of Mars which the company was attempting to adapt. Angered at the rejection, Clements and Musker approached Feature Animation chairman Roy E. Disney who backed the filmmakers and made his wishes known to Eisner, who in turn agreed that the studio should produce the movie. In 1995, their contract was re-negotiated to allow them to commence development on Treasure Planet when Hercules reached completion.

Since Musker and Clements wanted to be able to move "the camera around a lot like Steven Spielberg or James Cameron," the delay in production was beneficial since "the technology had time to develop in terms of really moving the camera." Principal animation for the film began in 2000 with roughly 350 crew members working on it. In 2002, Roy Conli estimated that there were around 1,027 crew members listed in the screen credits with "about four hundred artists and computer artists, about a hundred and fifty musicians and another two hundred technologists". According to Conli, Clements wanted to create a space world that was "warm and had more life to it than you would normally think of in a science fiction film", as opposed to the "stainless steel, blue, smoke coming from the bowels of heavily pipe laden" treatment of science fiction. In order to make the film "fun" by creating more exciting action sequences and because they believed that having the characters wear space suits and helmets "would take all the romance out of it", the crew created the concept of the "Etherium", an "outer space filled with atmosphere" and the characters wear 18th-century clothing much like in the original Treasure Island.

Several changes were made late in the production to the film. The prologue of the film originally featured an adult Jim Hawkins narrating the story of Captain Flint in first person, but the crew considered it too "dark" and felt that it lacked character involvement, so it was changed and instead narrated by Tony Jay. The crew also intended for the film to include a sequence showing Jim working on his solar surfer and interacting with an alien child, which was intended to show Jim's more sensitive side and as homage to The Catcher in the Rye. Because of the intention to begin the film with a scene of Jim solar surfing, the sequence had to be cut.

=== Writing ===
Writer Rob Edwards stated that "it was extremely challenging" to take a classic novel and set it in outer space, and that they did away with some of the science fiction elements ("things like the metal space ships and the coldness") early on. Edwards goes on to say that they "did a lot of things to make the film more modern" and that the idea behind setting the film in outer space was to "make the story as exciting for kids now as the book was for kids then".

With regard to adapting the characters from the book to film, Ron Clements mentioned that the Jim Hawkins in the book is "a very smart, very capable kid", but they wanted to make Jim start out as "a little troubled kid" who "doesn't really know who he is" while retaining the aforementioned characteristics from the original character. This change was made after Joe Ranft suggested the idea. The "mentor figures" for Jim Hawkins in the novel were Squire Trelawney and Dr. Livesey, whom John Musker described as "one is more comic and the other's very straight"; these two characters were fused into Dr. Doppler. Clements also mentions that though the father-son relationship between Jim Hawkins and John Silver was present "to some degree" in the book, they wanted to emphasize it more in the film.

Terry Rossio, who worked on the script, later argued the filmmakers made a crucial mistake turning Jim Hawkins into an adolescent. "Treasure Island, the book, is a boy's adventure, about a young cabin boy who matches wits with a crew of bloodthirsty pirates. All of the key scenes are made more dramatic by the fact that it's a young kid who is in danger... Treasure Planet made the kid into a young man. Which dilutes the drama of all the situations, start to finish... Instead of being an amazing and impressive kid, he became a petulant unimpressive teen."

=== Casting ===
Casting director Ruth Lambert held a series of casting auditions for the film in New York, Los Angeles, and London, but the crew already had some actors in mind for two of the major characters. The character of Dr. Doppler was written with David Hyde Pierce in mind, and in 1997 Pierce was given a copy of the Treasure Planet script along with preliminary sketches of the character and the film's scenic elements while he was working on Pixar's A Bug's Life (1998). He stated that "the script was fantastic, the look was so compelling" that he accepted the role. Jeff Goldblum and Hugh Grant were also considered before Pierce secured the part. Likewise, the character of Captain Amelia was developed with the idea that Emma Thompson would be providing her voice. "We offered it to her and she was really excited," Clements said. Musker said, "This is the first action adventure character that Emma has ever played and she was pregnant during several of the sessions. She was happy that she could do all this action and not have to train for the part" There were no actors initially in mind for the characters of John Silver and Jim Hawkins; Brian Murray (John Silver) and Joseph Gordon-Levitt (Jim Hawkins) were signed after months of auditions. Gordon-Levitt stated that he was attracted to the role because "it's a Disney animated movie and Disney animated movies are in a class by themselves," and that "to be part of that tradition is unbelievable to me". Musker mentioned that Gordon-Levitt "combined enough vulnerability and intelligence and a combination of youthfulness but incompleteness" and that they liked his approach. Patrick McGoohan was cast as Billy Bones at the suggestion of Corey Burton who played the smaller role of Onus in the film after having done an impression of him for a temp track. It marked the last film role of his career.

Among the big-name actors, only Pierce and Short had experience with voice acting prior to the making of Treasure Planet. Conli explained that they were looking for "really the natural voice of the actor", and that sometimes it was better to have an actor with no experience with voice work as he utilizes his natural voice instead of "affecting a voice". The voice sessions were mostly done without any interaction with the other actors, but Gordon-Levitt expressed a desire to interact with Murray because he found it difficult to act out most of the scenes between Jim Hawkins and John Silver alone.

=== Design ===
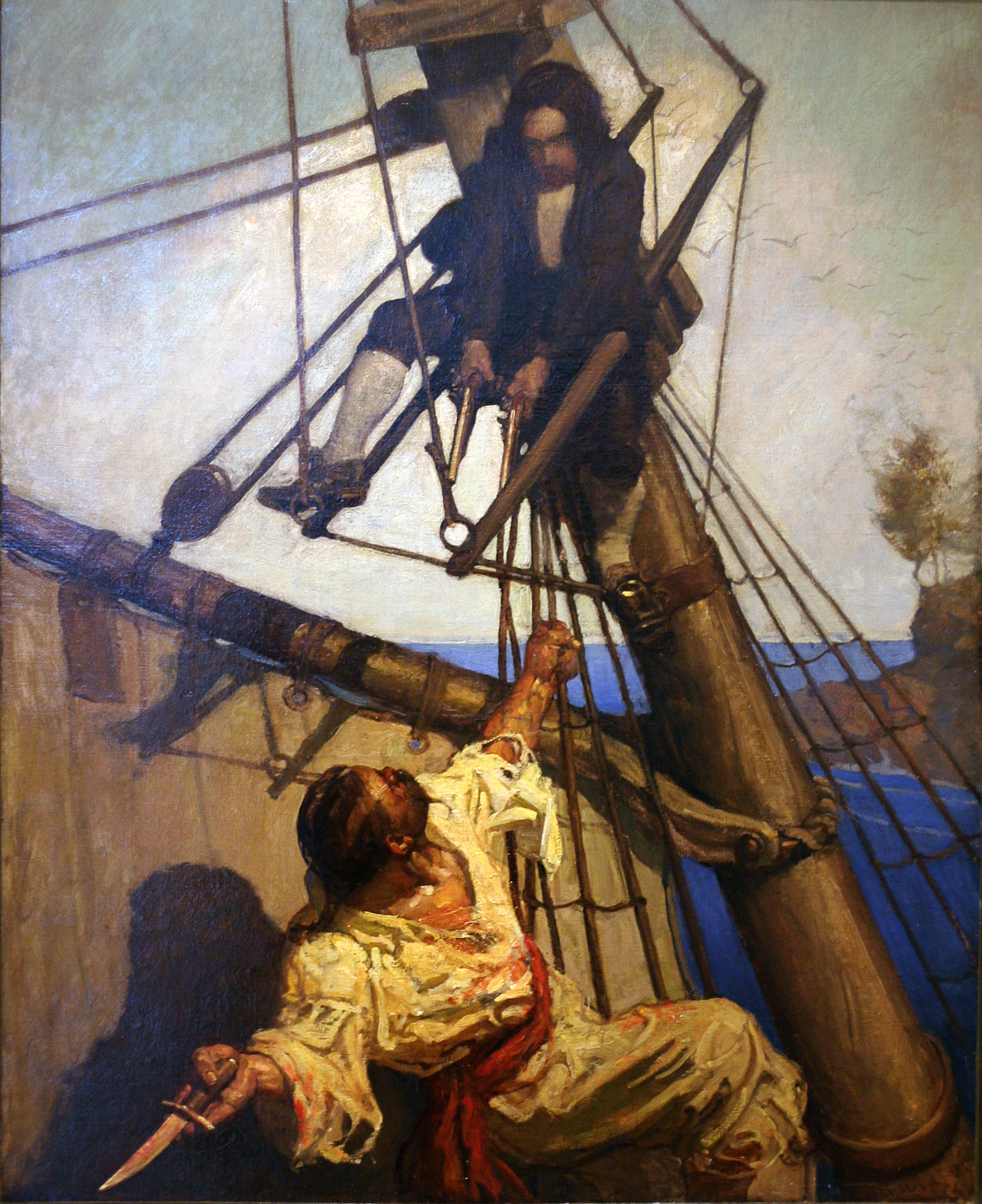
An illustration by N.C. Wyeth titled One More Step, Mr. Hands for a 1911 publication of Treasure Island. This type of illustration, which was described by the film crew as "classic storybook illustration," was the basis for Treasure Planet's overall look.

While designing for Treasure Planet, the crew operated on rule they call the "70/30 Law" (an idea that art director Andy Gaskill has credited to Ron Clements), which meant that the overall look of the film's artwork should be 70% traditional and 30% sci-fi. The overall look of Treasure Planet was based on the art style promoted by illustrators associated with the Brandywine School of Illustration (such as Howard Pyle and N.C. Wyeth), whose illustrations have been described by the film's crew as being the "classic storybook illustration", having a painterly feel to it, and being composed of a warm color palette.

There were around forty animators on the crew, and were further divided into teams; for example, sixteen animators were assigned to Jim Hawkins because he appeared on the screen the most, and twelve were assigned to John Silver. To ensure "solidity" in illustration and personality, each major character in the film had a team of animators led by one animation supervisor. Conli mentioned that the personalities of the supervisors affected the final character, citing Glen Keane (the supervisor for John Silver) as well as John Ripa (the supervisor for Jim Hawkins) as examples. The physical appearance, movements, and facial expressions of the voice actors were infused into the characters as well.

When asked if they drew inspiration from the previous film adaptations of Treasure Island for the character designs, Glen Keane said he disliked looking at previous portrayals of a character to "clear his mind of stereotypes", but that he drew some inspiration for the manner by which Silver spoke from actor Wallace Beery, whom he "loved because of the way he talked out of the side of his mouth." For the characterization and design for Jim Hawkins, John Ripa cited James Dean as an important reference because "there was a whole attitude, a posture" wherein "you felt the pain and the youthful innocence", and he also cited the film Braveheart because "there are a lot of close-ups on characters...who are going through thought processes, just using their eyes."

Animators also used maquettes, small statues of the characters in the film, as references throughout the animation process. Character sculptor Kent Melton mentioned that the first Disney film to use maquettes was Pinocchio (1940), and that this paved the way to the formation of an entire department devoted to character sculpting. Keane noted that maquettes are not just supposed to be "like a mannequin in a store", but rather has to be "something that tells you [the character's] personality" and that maquettes also helped inspire the way actors would portray their roles.

The animators took Deep Canvas, a technology initially developed for Tarzan (1999), and came up with a process they called "Virtual Sets", wherein they created entire 360 degree sets before they began staging the scenes. They combined this process with traditionally-drawn characters in order to achieve a "painted image with depth perception" and enabled the crew to place the camera anywhere in the set and maneuver it as they would maneuver a camera for a live-action film. In order to test how a computer-generated body part (specifically John Silver's cyborg arm) would mesh with a traditionally animated character, the crew took a clip of Captain Hook from Peter Pan (1953) and replaced his arm with the cyborg arm.

=== Animation ===
One of the film's goals was to blend different mediums of animation into one film to have such a seamless finish that viewers could not tell the difference between what was two-dimensional hand drawing and computer-generated 3D animations and environments. The film incorporated three animation mediums: traditional 2D character animation that Disney was known for, three-dimensional character animation, and the computer-generated or CG environments.

=== Music and sound ===
The "70/30 Law" of "70% traditional and 30% sci-fi" was not only applied to the visual designs for the film, but also for the sound effects and music. Sound designer Dane A. Davis mentioned that he and his team "scoured hobby shops and junk stores for antique windup toys and old spinning mechanisms" in order to create the sound effects for John Silver to "avoid sounding slick or sci-fi". The team did some experimentation with the sound used in dialogues, especially with the robot B.E.N., but opted to keep Short's natural voice because everything they tried "affected his comedy", and "the last thing you want to do in a story like this is affect performances".

The music from the film is largely orchestral in nature, although it includes two pop singles ("I'm Still Here" and "Always Know Where You Are") from The Goo Goo Dolls frontman John Rzeznik and British pop-rock group BBMak. Both songs were written and performed by John Rzeznik in the film, but BBMak recorded "Always Know Where You Are" for the soundtrack. The score was composed by James Newton Howard, who said that the score is "very much in the wonderful tradition of Korngold and Tiomkin and Steiner." The score has been described as a mixture of modern "classical style" music in the spirit of Star Wars and Celtic music. Scottish fiddler Alasdair Fraser is credited as the co-composer of the track "Silver Leaves", and is also listed as a soloist in the film's credits. Walt Disney Records released the film's soundtrack album on November 19, 2002. Jerry Goldsmith was also considered to compose the score.

== Marketing ==
In April 2002, a teaser trailer for Treasure Planet was officially released online. It would then debut in theaters within the next few weeks, being attached to the releases of some films, including Spider-Man and Star Wars: Episode II – Attack of the Clones. Before and during its theatrical run, Treasure Planet had promotional support from McDonald's, Pepsi-Cola, Dreyer's, and Kellogg's. McDonald's included promotional items such as action figures and puzzles in their Happy Meals and Mighty Meals, Pepsi-Cola placed promotional film graphics onto the packaging of a number of their soft drinks (Mountain Dew, Code Red, Sierra Mist, Mug Root Beer, Orange Slice, and Lipton Brisk), Dreyer's used their delivery truck panels to promote ice cream flavors inspired by the film (such as "Galactic Chocolate" and "Vanilla Treasure"), and Kellogg's included film-branded spoons in their cereal boxes.

Hasbro released a lineup of Treasure Planet action figures and toys.

A novelization was published by Puffin Books.

== Release ==
=== Theatrical ===
Treasure Planet held its world premiere in Paris, France on November 6, 2002. It premiered in the US at Cinerama Dome in Hollywood on November 17, 2002, The film is "the first major studio feature" to be released in regular and IMAX theaters simultaneously; this was done in the light of the success of Disney films that were re-released in IMAX format, such as Beauty and the Beast and Fantasia 2000. Dick Cook, then-chairman of Walt Disney Studios, expressed the hope that it would be a good way to distinguish themselves during the competitive holiday season.

=== Home media ===
Treasure Planet was released on VHS and DVD in the United States and Canada by Walt Disney Home Entertainment on April 29, 2003. The DVD includes behind-the-scenes featurettes, still galleries, deleted scenes, teaser and theatrical trailers, the music video for the song "I'm Still Here" by John Rzeznik, a virtual tour of the RLS Legacy, and a Visual Commentary that periodically branches off to these features. The DVD retained the number one spot in Billboard's top sales for two weeks and the VHS was number one in sales for three weeks. By July 2003, Treasure Planet brought in $64 million in DVD sales.

It is officially the last Disney animated feature to be presented in fullscreen on its VHS release, as the VHS releases of Brother Bear (2003) and Home on the Range (2004) are presented in widescreen. However, the Disney Movie Club exclusive VHS release of Chicken Little (2005) is presented in fullscreen.

Disney released a 10th Anniversary special edition Blu-ray/DVD combo on July 3, 2012.

== Reception ==
=== Box office ===
Treasure Planet grossed over $12 million on its debut weekend, ranking at fourth place behind Harry Potter and the Chamber of Secrets, James Bond's Die Another Day, and Disney's own The Santa Clause 2. During the five-day Thanksgiving holiday weekend, the film grossed just $16.5 million. The film ended up grossing $38.1 million domestically and $71.4 million internationally for a $109.5 million worldwide gross. Its failure became apparent early on, as Disney's Buena Vista Distribution arm reduced its fourth-quarter earnings by $47 million within a few days of the film's release. In 2014, the Los Angeles Times listed the film as one of the most expensive box office failures of all time.

=== Critical response ===
Treasure Planet received generally positive reviews from critics. The review aggregator website Rotten Tomatoes reported that 69% of critics have given the film a positive review based on 150 reviews, with an average rating of 6.5/10. The site's critics consensus states "Though its characterizations are weaker than usual, Treasure Planet offers a fast-paced, beautifully rendered vision of outer space." Metacritic assigned the film a weighted average score of 60 out of 100 based on 30 reviews from mainstream critics, indicating "mixed or average reviews". Audiences polled by CinemaScore gave the film an average grade of "A−" on an A+ to F scale.

Stephen Hunter of The Washington Post, who gave it 4 stars out of 5, stated that the film "boasts the purest of Disney raptures: It unites the generations, rather than driving them apart". Leah Rozen of People stated that the film "has imagination, humor aplenty and moves briskly", and that "the animation, combining traditional and digital techniques, is ravishing." Claudia Puig of USA Today said that the film's most noteworthy feature is "the artful way it combines the futuristic and the retro", and went on to say that the film does not have the "charm of Lilo & Stitch" nor the "dazzling artistry of Spirited Away", but concluded that Treasure Planet is "a capable and diverting holiday season adventure for a family audience." Kim Hollis of Box Office Prophets stated that "there's plenty to recommend the film – the spectacular visuals alone make Treasure Planet a worthwhile watch," though expressing disappointment because she felt that the characters were "not all that creatively rendered".

Roger Ebert of the Chicago Sun-Times gave it 2.5 stars out of 4; he felt that a more traditional take on the story would have been "more exciting" and "less gimmicky". Andy Klein of Daily Variety Gotham complained about the script, describing it as "listless" and remarked, "If only its script were as amusing as its visuals." A. O. Scott of The New York Times described the film as "less an act of homage than a clumsy and cynical bit of piracy", and went on to say that it is "not much of a movie at all" and a "brainless, mechanical picture". Owen Gleiberman of Entertainment Weekly described the film as "all cutesy updated fripperies and zero momentum."

In 2020, Petrana Radulovic, writing for Polygon, praised the characters of Jim and Silver, as well as the "I'm Still Here" sequence and stated, the film "is a visual delight, a time capsule of the early 2000s in a way that perhaps no other animated movie of the era is. It boldly, unapologetically pushes the visual limits of genre expectation in a way no Disney movie has since."

=== Awards and nominations ===
The film was nominated for the Academy Award for Best Animated Feature along with Lilo & Stitch, Ice Age and Spirit: Stallion of the Cimarron, but all four films lost to Spirited Away (2001). It was also nominated for a number of Annie Awards.

Award	Date of ceremony	Category	Recipients	Result
Academy Awards	March 23, 2003	Best Animated Feature	Ron Clements	Nominated
Annie Awards	February 1, 2003			
Annie Awards	February 1, 2003	Outstanding Character Animation	Sergio Pablos	Nominated
Annie Awards	February 1, 2003	Outstanding Achievement for Animated Effects in an Animated Production	Peter DeSève	Nominated
Annie Awards	February 1, 2003	Outstanding Achievement for Character Design in a Feature Production	Steven Olds	Nominated
Annie Awards	February 1, 2003	Voice Acting in an Animated Feature Production	Brian Murray	Nominated
Annie Awards	February 1, 2003	Voice Acting in an Animated Feature Production	Emma Thompson	Nominated
Annie Awards	February 1, 2003	Outstanding Achievement for Animated Effects in an Animated Production	Kee Nam Suong	Nominated
Golden Reel Award	2003	Golden Reel Award for Outstanding Achievement in Sound Editing – Sound Effects, Foley, Dialogue and ADR for Animated Feature Film	Dane Davis (supervising sound editor); Julia Evershade (supervising sound/dialogue/adr editor); Andrew Lackey (supervising foley editor); Richard Adrian (sound editor)	Won
Saturn Awards	May 18, 2003	Best Animated Feature	Treasure Planet	Nominated
Young Artist Awards	March 29, 2003	Best Performance in a Voice-Over Role - Age Ten or Younger	Austin Majors	Nominated

== Cancelled franchise ==
Before Treasure Planet premiered in cinemas, Thomas Schumacher, then-president of Walt Disney Feature Animation, mentioned the possibilities of having direct-to-video releases for Treasure Planet as well as a television series. He stated that they already had "a story and some storyboards and concepts up and a script for what a sequel to [Treasure Planet] could be," and that they also had a "notion" of what the series would be.

Director Jun Falkenstein and screenwriter Evan Spiliotopoulos began early development on Treasure Planet 2. In the sequel, Jim Hawkins and Kate, his love interest and classmate at the Royal Interstellar Academy, must team with Long John Silver to stop the villainous Ironbeard from freeing the inmates of Botany Bay Prison Asteroid. Gordon-Levitt and Murray were set to reprise their roles as Hawkins and Silver and Willem Dafoe was going to voice Ironbeard. Tommy Walter was asked to write and perform songs for the film. However, the sequel was canceled when Treasure Planet did poorly at the box office.

Following the box office failure of Atlantis: The Lost Empire (2001), Disneyland planned a second attempt to revive its Submarine Voyage ride with a Treasure Planet theme. These plans were scrapped due to the film experiencing the same financial performance as its predecessor. The attraction ultimately reopened in 2007 as the Finding Nemo Submarine Voyage, themed to the 2003 Disney/Pixar animated film Finding Nemo.

== Video games ==
Several Treasure Planet video games were released. In October 2002, Disney Interactive released the naval strategy game Treasure Planet: Battle at Procyon for the PC, while in November, Sony Computer Entertainment released two separate Treasure Planet 3D platform action video games for the PlayStation (developed by Magenta Software) and PlayStation 2 (developed by Bizarre Creations). Bizarre Creations used Softimage's XSI engine for modeling, texturing and animation, and released a Making-of video on their Facebook page in 2008. A Game Boy Advance game based on the film was also released. A demo of the game was also included on the December 2002 demo disc from the Official U.S. PlayStation Magazine, alongside other PS2 games.

A series of games collectively called Disney's Treasure Planet: Training Academy (or Disney's Treasure Planet Collection) was also released in 2002. It was composed of three games (Broadside Blast, Treasure Racer, and Etherium Rescue), and players with all three games could unlock a fourth game (Ship Shape).

Jim Hawkins, Captain Amelia, and John Silver appear as playable characters in Disney Heroes: Battle Mode.

=== Reception ===
Disney's Treasure Planet

Aggregate scores
Aggregator	Score
GameRankings	(GBA) 66.43% (PS2) 64% (PS) 57.14%
Metacritic	(GBA) 68/100 (PS2) 61/100 (PS) 44/100

The game was met with a mixed reception upon release. GameRankings and Metacritic gave it a score of 66.43% and 68 out of 100 for the Game Boy Advance version, 64% and 61 out of 100 for the PlayStation 2 version, and 57.14% and 44 out of 100 for the PlayStation version.

== Legacy ==
On November 27, 2022, Disney D23 posted on Twitter: "It has been 20 years since Jim Hawkins rattled the stars in @DisneyAnimation's Treasure Planet! Happy anniversary to this stellar film!" A limited commemorative pin was also released by the company for the anniversary as well as a Sketchbook Ornament. Many members of the crew who worked on the film including directors John Musker and Ron Clements, composer James Newton Howard as well as actor Corey Burton also celebrated its anniversary by partaking in a three-hour livestream on YouTube on The Tammy Tuckey Show. The event had been organised ahead of time.

== See also ==
- Treasure Island in Outer Space (Il Pianeta del Tesoro or Treasure Planet), an Italian/German 1987 live-action adaptation of the classic novel with similar setting.
- Lost in Space: "Treasure of the Lost Planet" (1967, 23rd episode of season 2), another interplanetary adventure loosely based on the same novel.

== Bibliography ==
- Odermatt, Kyle; Springfield, Chris (2002). "Creating 3D painterly environments for Disney's 'Treasure Planet'". ACM SIGGRAPH 2002 conference abstracts and applications. p. 160. doi:10.1145/1242073.1242173. ISBN 1-58113-525-4.
- Gustavson, Rolf (2022). Exploring a Pantheon of Styles : Musical eclecticism in Treasure Planet (Thesis).
- Sawyer Fritz, Sonya (2018). "In Space No One Can Hear You Cry: Late Victorian Adventure and Contemporary Boyhood in Disney's Treasure Planet". In Fritz, Sonya Sawyer; Day, Sara K. (eds.). The Victorian Era in Twenty-First Century Children's and Adolescent Literature and Culture. Routledge. pp. 55–71. doi:10.4324/9781315147529. ISBN 978-1-351-37627-3.
