= Sneaks (film) =

2025 animated film directed by Rob Edwards and Chris Jenkins

- Theatrical release poster
- Directed by: Rob Edwards; Chris Jenkins
- Written by: Rob Edwards
- Produced by: Laurence Fishburne; Helen Sugland; Len Hartman; Gil Cloyd; Meko Yohannes; Jeremy Ross; Robyn Klein
- Starring: Anthony Mackie; Martin Lawrence; Swae Lee; Chloe Bailey; Macy Gray; Ella Mai; Mustard; Roddy Ricch; Quavo; Young Miko; Amirah Hall; Kiana Ledé; Bobbito García; Sam Jay; Sky Brown; Rayssa Leal; Rico Rodriguez; Keith David; Chris Paul; Laurence Fishburne
- Music by: Terrace Martin (score); Mustard (songs)
- Production companies: Ashland Hill Media Finance; GFM Animation; Rabbits Black; RTG Features; Waffle Iron Entertainment; Assemblage Entertainment; Cinema Gypsy Productions; Lengi Studios
- Distributed by: Sky Cinema (United Kingdom); Briarcliff Entertainment (United States)
- Release dates: March 28, 2025 (United Kingdom); April 18, 2025 (United States)
- Running time: 93 minutes
- Countries: United States; United Kingdom; India; Canada
- Language: English
- Box office: $1.5 million

Sneaks is a 2025 animated sports comedy film directed by Rob Edwards and Chris Jenkins from a script by Edwards. It is Edwards' feature directorial debut.

An international co-production of the United States, United Kingdom, India and Canada, the film stars an ensemble voice cast of Anthony Mackie, Martin Lawrence, Swae Lee, Chloe Bailey, Macy Gray, Ella Mai, Mustard, Roddy Ricch, Quavo, Young Miko, Amirah Hall, Kiana Ledé, Bobbito Garcia, Sam Jay, Sky Brown, Rayssa Leal, Rico Rodriguez, Keith David, Chris Paul, and Laurence Fishburne.

Sneaks was released on Sky Cinema in the United Kingdom on March 28, 2025, and was released theatrically in the United States on April 18. The film received negative reviews from critics and grossed $1.5 million worldwide.

== Plot ==
In a world of anthropomorphic shoes, a high school basketball player named Edson wins an exclusive pair of sneakers, Ty and Maxine, much to the frustration of the Collector, a high-profile sneaker collector. Maxine is excited to finally have an owner and be used for Edson's upcoming game, whereas Ty would rather stay pristine inside the shoebox. The Collector later breaks into Edson's house and steals Ty and Maxine, but during the escape, Ty falls out of the shoebox and lands on a wire.

Ty's cries for help attract the attention of JB, an old and abandoned sneaker, who decides to help Ty after noticing he is a luxury sneaker. At the Collector's home, he is called by his employer the Forger, a mysterious maker of counterfeit shoes who plans to use Ty and Maxine to create more shoes. Realizing Ty is missing, the Collector asks for more time before he can hand the pair to the Forger and sets out to find Ty.

As they journey through the city, Ty and JB meet up with JB's old friends at a basketball court. The two play basketball and win in exchange for information on where they could find Maxine, they are redirected to Adriana, a high heel and JB's ex-girlfriend at a wedding party. Adriana further redirects Ty and JB to a bowling alley and leave after the Collector crashes the party.

After making it to the bowling alley, a betrayed Ty abandons JB as JB admits he only helped Ty for his looks. Wandering down the street, JB comes across a moribund shoe, who was cut in half by the Forger. He explains who the Forger is and what he does with the shoes' remains before succumbing to his injuries. Desperate to save his friend, JB takes Ty's place to spare him from his horrid fate after the Collector locates Ty at the bowling alley, inadvertently taking JB instead. The shoes from the bowling alley reveal JB's past life as a luxury sneaker and how he was abandoned by his owner, a famous basketball player, after he made him lose an important game. Ty and the shoes race through a city park to the Collector's apartment to save JB.

When the Collector arrives at his apartment, he finds the Forger has arrived first and has Maxine in his possession. The Forger discovers that JB had switched places with Ty and believes the Collector is trying to hold off his end of the deal. As retaliation, the Forger exposes to the world the Collector's real identity and reveals he was the basketball player JB made him lose the game. Maxine and the rest of the Collector's shoes act out and stop the Forger by tying him to a chair. Ty and Maxine are reunited, as well as JB and his long-lost pair Spike.

Later that day, the Collector decides to return Ty and Maxine to Edson during his basketball game so he can play the game properly.

== Voice cast ==
- Anthony Mackie as Ty, a limited edition white shoe, who prefers being displayed rather than being worn
- Martin Lawrence as JB, a streetwise, scuffed up black shoe with an affinity for anything shiny
- Chloe Bailey as Maxine, Ty's sister who's the opposite of her brother and prefers being worn instead of being displayed
- Laurence Fishburne as Isaac "The Collector", a former basketball player turned professional shoe collector who once owned JB and Spike
- Roddy Ricch as The Forger, The Collector's boss who cuts up shoes and uses the remains as forgeries
- Ella Mai as Britany, Ty's love interest
- Macy Gray as Adriana, JB's former lover
- Swae Lee as Edson, a basketball-obsessed young man who wins Ty and Maxine
- Chris Paul as himself
- Mustard as himself and Marcel, a wire shoe
- Quavo as Spike, JB's missing brother
- Sam Jay as a gutter ball attendant
- Keith David as O.G.
- Donovan Louis Bazemore as Trey, a wire shoe
- Coi Leray
- Kiana Ledé as Shawna, Edson’s mom
- Jonathan Kite as Whiz, a nerdy shoe
- Amari McCoy as Shanika
- Sky Brown as Sky
- Rayssa Leal as Rayssa
- Young Miko as Tiffany, a wire shoe
- Amirah Hall as Vanessa, Edson’s love interest
- Rico Rodriguez as Ice
- Bobbito Garcia as Bobbito

== Production ==
In November 2018, it was announced that Pixar veteran Teddy Newton was set to direct a new animated film titled Sneaks. In June 2021, it was announced that Rob Edwards would write the script and replace Newton as the director and that Laurence Fishburne would produce and provide the voice of The Collector. In October that same year, it was announced that Roddy Ricch, Ella Mai, Macy Gray, Swae Lee and Chris Paul were cast in the film. In February 2023, it was announced that Anthony Mackie, Chloe Bailey, Martin Lawrence and others were cast in the film. Voice recording had begun by November 2024. Mumbai-based studio Assemblage Entertainment handled the animation for the film.

== Release ==
In November 2024, Briarcliff Entertainment acquired North American distribution rights to the film. The film debuted on April 18, 2025 in over 1,430 theaters nationwide.

Three weeks prior to its American release, the film was made available to stream in the United Kingdom via Sky Cinema on March 28.

The film was released on digital platforms on May 6, 2025 and on DVD June 24, by Universal Pictures Home Entertainment (the latter through Studio Distribution Services).

== Reception ==
=== Box office ===
Sneaks grossed $916,022 in the United States, and $614,185 in other territories, for a worldwide total of $1,530,207.

The film made $530,786 in its domestic opening weekend. In its second weekend, the film was pulled from 1,092 theaters, grossing only $82,000.

=== Critical response ===
On the review aggregator website Rotten Tomatoes, 29% of 24 critics' reviews are positive, with an average rating of 4.3/10. The website's consensus reads: "Hampered by scuffed animation and a gratingly squeaky sense of humor, Sneaks falls short of imbuing its inanimate characters with a human dimension." Metacritic, which uses a weighted average, assigned the film a score of 42 out of 100, based on 5 critics, indicating "mixed or average" reviews.

Nell Minow of RogerEbert.com gave the film three and a half out of four stars and wrote, "Sneaks is an exciting, funny, heartwarming, joyful, and endearingly wise adventure, set in a dazzlingly vibrant New York City, with lively music by composer Terrace Martin and songs from producer Mustard."

Conversely, Nate Richard of Collider gave it a score of 1 out of 10, writing, "While it is correct that a movie like Sneaks is an easy target for criticism, its poor animation, plethora of corny shoe puns, uninspired story, and bland voice-acting help earn its title as one of the very worst movies of 2025."

== Accolades ==
- NAACP Image Awards - Animated Motion Picture & Character Voice Performance (nominated)
