= John Musker =

American animation filmmaker (born 1953)

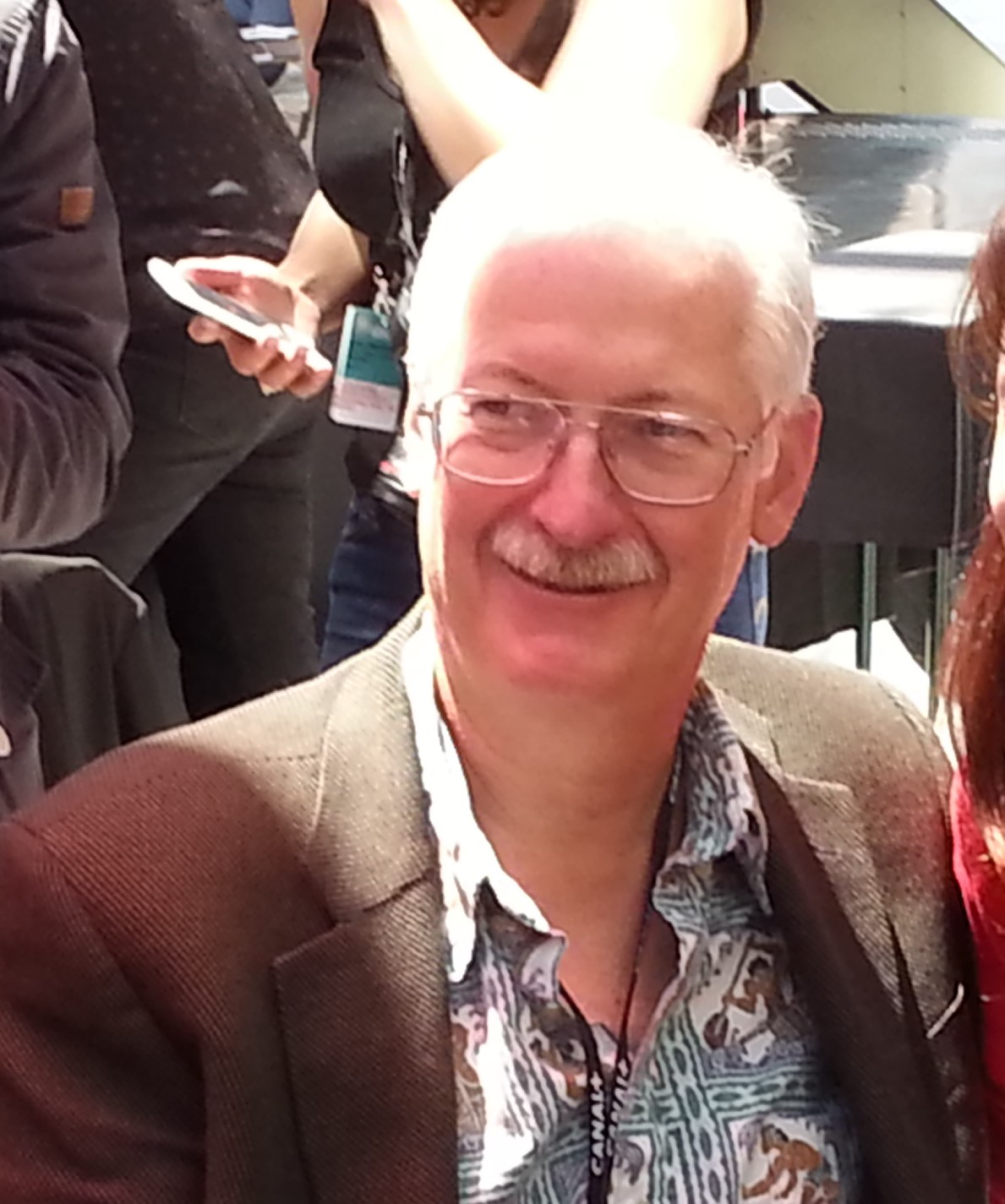
- Musker at the 2016 Annecy International Animated Film Festival
- Born: John Edward Musker; November 8, 1953 (age 72); Chicago, Illinois, U.S.
- Education: Northwestern University (BA); California Institute of the Arts (MFA)
- Occupations: Animator; film director; screenwriter; film producer
- Years active: 1977–present
- Employer: Walt Disney Animation Studios
- Spouse: Gale Musker
- Children: 3

Signature
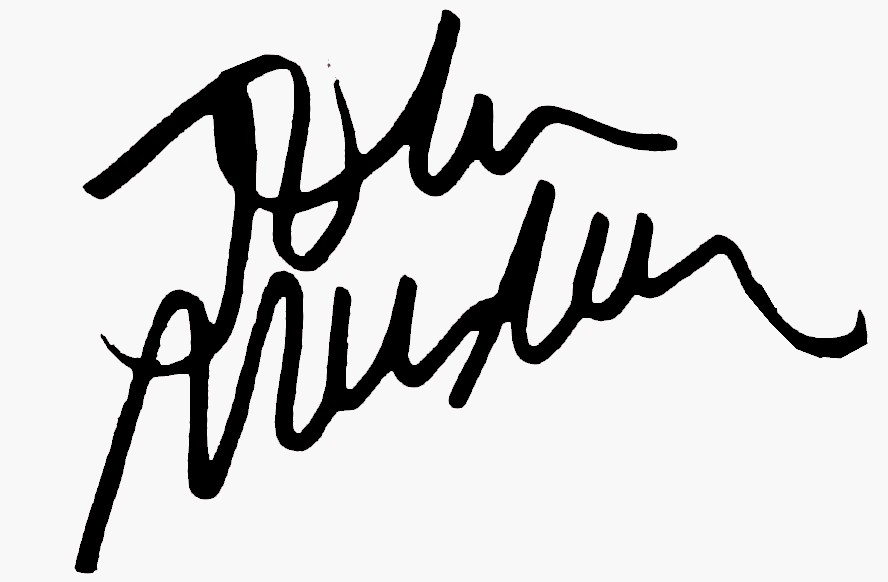

John Edward Musker (born November 8, 1953) is an American animator and filmmaker. He often collaborates with fellow director Ron Clements and is best known for writing and directing the Disney animated films The Great Mouse Detective (1986), The Little Mermaid (1989), Aladdin (1992), Hercules (1997), Treasure Planet (2002), The Princess and the Frog (2009), Moana (2016).

== Early life ==
Musker was born in Chicago, Illinois, the second oldest of eight children in an Irish Catholic family. His father, Robert J. Musker, who worked for over 40 years at Illinois Bell Telephone, died in 2008 at the age of 84, and his mother, Joan T. Musker (née Lally), died in 2011 at the age of 81.

He attended Loyola Academy in Illinois and then graduated from the Weinberg College of Arts and Sciences at Northwestern University, where he majored in English and drew cartoons for the Daily Northwestern. After that, he obtained his Master of Fine Arts at CALARTS, California Institute of the Arts in Santa Clarita. There he served a two-year apprenticeship with famed animator Frank Thomas, a supervising animator of Disney films such as Peter Pan (1953), Lady and the Tramp (1955), and The Aristocats (1970).

== Career ==
Musker met Ron Clements during the production of The Fox and the Hound in 1981, where he worked as a character animator under Clements and Cliff Nordberg. Musker teamed up with Clements as story artists on The Black Cauldron before they were removed from the project.

Following the green-lighting of Clements's pitch for an adaptation of the children's book series Basil of Baker Street by Eve Titus into an animated feature, Musker and fellow story artist Burny Mattinson were assigned as the original directors while Dave Michener was brought in as an additional director. Due to a shortened production schedule and multiple story rewrites, Roy E. Disney assigned Mattinson to serve as director/producer while Ron Clements was brought in as another director.

While working on The Great Mouse Detective, newly appointed Disney CEO and chairman Michael Eisner and Jeffrey Katzenberg issued invitations to the animation staff for their first held "gong show" session. Demanding only five new ideas, Clements pitched an adaptation of Hans Christian Andersen's The Little Mermaid and a high-concept idea of Treasure Island in Space, which were both rejected by Katzenberg and Eisner. The next morning, Katzenberg approached Clements and asked him to expand his initial treatment.

With The Little Mermaid in production in 1986, Musker joined Clements in expanding the original treatment into a twenty-page rough script, eliminating the role of the mermaid's grandmother and expanding the roles of the Merman King and the sea witch, and were later joined by Off-Broadway musical composers Howard Ashman and Alan Menken who collaborated on the song and musical score. Released in November 1989, The Little Mermaid was praised as a milestone in rebirth of Disney animation by film critics and collected a domestic gross of $84 million, cumulatively receiving $184.2 million worldwide.

When work on The Little Mermaid was wrapped, Clements and Musker re-developed their idea for Treasure Planet, but the studio still expressed disinterest. Instead, the two directors were offered three projects in development: Swan Lake, King of the Jungle, and Aladdin. The directors eventually chose the latter, desiring a wacky, faster-paced, and more contemporary mood separate from the previous Disney animated films.

Working from Ashman and Menken's treatment and musical score, the two delivered a story reel to Katzenberg in April 1991, which was strongly disapproved. Jettisoning multiple characters and story ideas and adding Ted Elliott and Terry Rossio as co-screenwriters, the production team restructured the entire story in eight days. Released in November 1992, Aladdin received positive reviews from critics, and became the first animated film to gross over $200 million domestically.

Following work on Aladdin, Clements, along with Musker, resumed their work on Treasure Planet, which was again turned down by Katzenberg in 1993, who disapproved of setting the adaptation of a classic adventure tale in outer space. A deal was struck with the two directors to create another commercial film before he would approve Treasure Planet. Rejecting projects in development such as Don Quixote, The Odyssey, and Around the World in Eighty Days, they were later informed of animator Joe Haidar's pitch for a Hercules feature, and signed onto the project.

During production on Hercules, in 1995, Clements and Musker signed a seven-year contract deal with the studio which stipulated following Hercules, the studio would produce Treasure Planet or another project of their choosing.

With Treasure Planet completed in 2002, Clements and Musker inherited Fraidy Cat, a project originally developed by Dutch animation director Piet Kroon. Fraidy Cat, however, never saw the light of day, as David Stainton, then-president of Walt Disney Feature Animation, refused to green-light the project. Shortly thereafter, Clements and Musker's resigned from Walt Disney Feature Animation in September 2005.

When John Lasseter was appointed chief creative officer over Walt Disney Feature Animation in February 2006, he invited Clements and Musker back to Disney to oversee production on The Frog Princess, and were officially confirmed as directors in the following July. Later re-titled The Princess and the Frog, the film received positive reviews and grossed $267 million worldwide.

After directing The Princess and the Frog, Clements and Musker started working on an adaptation of Terry Pratchett's Mort, but a failure to obtain the film rights prevented them from continuing the project. To avoid similar problems, they pitched three new original ideas. By 2011, at least one of those ideas was in development. In late 2012, the duo announced that they would be directing a new film in the future, but did not divulge the title, the plot, or the animation style.

In July 2013, it was revealed that the film, titled Moana, would be "a Polynesian tale involving the island folk and the idols made famous the world over." On November 10, 2014, Disney confirmed Moana would be released on November 23, 2016.

In March 2018, having worked at Disney for 40 years, Musker announced his retirement from Walt Disney Animation Studios. In 2023, he released his short film I'm Hip which he animated by hand.

== Personal life ==
Musker is married to Gale. They have twin sons, Jackson and Patrick, and a daughter, Julia. He also has sisters by the names of Patricia, Colleen, Kathleen, Maureen, and Terri, and two younger brothers, Robert and Martin.

== Filmography ==
=== Feature films ===
Year	Film	Credited as					
Year	Film	Director	Writer	Producer	Animator	Other	Notes
1981	The Fox and the Hound	No	No	No	Character	No	
1985	The Black Cauldron	No	No	No	No	Yes	Additional Story Contributor
1986	The Great Mouse Detective	Yes	Story	No	No	No	Developer - Uncredited
1989	The Little Mermaid	Yes	Yes	Yes	No	No	
1992	Aladdin	Yes	Screenplay	Yes	No	No	
1997	Hercules	Yes	Screenplay	Yes	No	No	
2002	Treasure Planet	Yes	Yes	Yes	No	No	Developer - uncredited
2008	Bolt	No	No	No	No	Yes	Special Thanks
2009	The Princess and the Frog	Yes	Yes	No	No	No	Additional Voices
2012	Wreck-It Ralph	No	No	No	No	Yes	Additional Visual Development Artist
2014	Big Hero 6	No	No	No	No	Yes	Creative Leadership
2016	Zootopia	No	No	No	No	Yes	Creative Leadership
2016	Moana	Yes	Story	No	No	No	Creative Leadership
2018	Ralph Breaks the Internet	No	No	No	No	Yes	Creative Leadership
2019	Aladdin	No	No	No	No	Yes	"Based on" credit
2023	The Little Mermaid	No	No	No	No	Yes	"Based on" credit
2026	Moana	No	No	No	No	Yes	"Based on" credit

==== Short films ====
Year	Film	Credited as		
Year	Film	Director	Other	Notes
1982	Luau	No	Yes	Role: Businessman
2008	Jack's Gift	No	Yes	Role: Doctor 1
2017	Gone Fishing	Yes	No	
2019	Mel	No	Yes	Special Thanks
2023	I'm Hip	Yes	No	

==== Documentaries ====
Year	Title	Role	Notes
2007	The Pixar Story	Himself	
2009	Waking Sleeping Beauty	Himself	caricaturist
2018	Howard	Himself	

== Awards and nominations ==
Ceremony	Category	Recipient	Result
Edgar Allan Poe Award	Best Motion Picture	The Great Mouse Detective	Nominated
Los Angeles Film Critics Association Award	Best Animated Film	The Little Mermaid	Won
Los Angeles Film Critics Association Award	Best Animated Film	Aladdin	Won
Annie Awards	Best Individual Achievement: Directing in a Feature Production	Hercules	Won
Annie Awards	Best Individual Achievement: Producing in a Feature Production	Hercules	Won
Annie Awards	Best Animated Feature	Hercules	Nominated
Los Angeles Film Critics Association Award	Best Animated Film	Hercules	Won
Academy Awards	Best Animated Feature	Treasure Planet	Nominated
Academy Awards	Best Animated Feature	The Princess and the Frog	Nominated
African-American Film Critics Association Award	Best Screenplay	The Princess and the Frog	Won
Academy Awards	Best Animated Feature	Moana	Nominated
Alliance of Women Film Journalists	Best Animated Feature	Moana	Nominated
Seattle Film Critics Awards	Best Animated Feature	Moana	Nominated

== Collaborations ==
John Musker and Ron Clements have cast certain actors in more than one of their films.

	The Great Mouse Detective	The Little Mermaid	Aladdin	Hercules	Treasure Planet	The Princess and the Frog
Charlie Adler		X mark	X mark			
Jack Angel		X mark	X mark	X mark	X mark	
Rodger Bumpass				X mark	X mark	
Corey Burton			X mark	X mark	X mark	X mark
Jim Cummings			X mark	X mark		X mark
Keith David				X mark		X mark
Mona Marshall					X mark	X mark
Debi Derryberry			X mark	X mark		
Paddi Edwards		X mark		X mark		
Jennifer Darling		X mark	X mark	X mark	X mark	X mark
Sherry Lynn		X mark	X mark	X mark	X mark	
Patrick Pinney		X mark	X mark	X mark	X mark	
Bob Bergen				X mark	X mark	
Phil Proctor			X mark	X mark	X mark	X mark
Frank Welker	X mark	X mark	X mark	X mark		X mark

== Bibliography ==
- Hulett, Steve (December 4, 2014). Mouse In Transition: An Insider's Look at Disney Feature Animation. Theme Park Press. ISBN 978-1941500248.
- Stewart, James (2005). DisneyWar. New York: Simon and Schuster. ISBN 0-684-80993-1.
- Thomas, Bob (March 7, 1997). Disney's Art of Animation: From Mickey Mouse To Hercules. Disney Editions. ISBN 978-0786862412.
