= Ron Clements =

American animation filmmaker (born 1953)

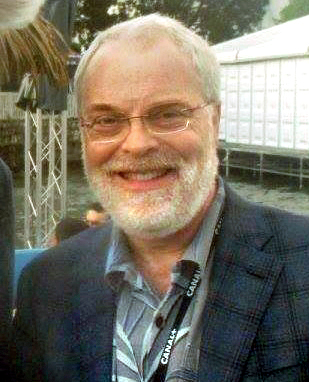
- Clements at the 2016 Annecy International Animated Film Festival
- Born: Ronald Francis Clements; April 25, 1953 (age 73); Sioux City, Iowa, U.S.
- Occupations: Animator; film director; screenwriter; film producer
- Years active: 1972–present
- Employer: Walt Disney Animation Studios
- Spouse: Tamara Lee Glumace (m. 1989)

Ronald Francis Clements (born April 25, 1953) is an American animator, film director, screenwriter, and film producer. He often collaborates with fellow director John Musker and is best known for writing and directing the Disney animated films The Great Mouse Detective (1986), The Little Mermaid (1989), Aladdin (1992), Hercules (1997), Treasure Planet (2002), The Princess and the Frog (2009), and Moana (2016).

== Life and career ==
Clements was born and raised in Sioux City, Iowa, the son of Gertrude (née Gereau) and Joseph Clements. He graduated from Bishop Heelan Catholic High School. One of his first jobs in the arts was working with the Sioux City Symphony Orchestra at the Orpheum Theatre.

Clements began his career as an animator for Hanna-Barbera. After a few months there, he was accepted into Disney's Talent Development Program, an animator training ground and workshop. After that, he served a two-year apprenticeship with famed animator Frank Thomas, a supervising animator of Disney films such as Peter Pan (1953), Lady and the Tramp (1955), and The Aristocats (1970). Clements made his feature debut as a character animator on The Rescuers and Pete's Dragon in 1977. In 1981, he became the supervising animator on The Fox and the Hound (1981). Future partner John Musker worked as a character animator under him, and Clements later teamed up with Musker as story artists on The Black Cauldron (1985) before they were removed from the project.

In 1982, Clements proposed adapting the children's book series Basil of Baker Street by Eve Titus into an animated feature and, along with story artist Pete Young, it was pitched to Ron Miller. Because the animators were displeased with the direction of The Black Cauldron was heading, Basil of Baker Street was approved as an alternative project. Burny Mattinson and Musker were assigned as the original directors while Dave Michener was brought in as an additional director. Due to a shortened production schedule and multiple story rewrites, Roy E. Disney assigned Mattinson to serve as director/producer while Clements was brought in as another director.

While working on The Great Mouse Detective (1986), newly appointed Disney CEO and chairman Michael Eisner and Jeffrey Katzenberg issued invitations to the animation staff for their first held "gong show" session. Demanding only five new ideas, Clements went to a bookstore and discovered Hans Christian Andersen's The Little Mermaid. Clements wrote and presented a two-page treatment to Disney Studios chairman Jeffrey Katzenberg at a "gong show" idea suggestion meeting, as well as conceptualized the idea of Treasure Planet (2002). At the gong show session, Mermaid was rejected for its similarities to Splash (1984) while Treasure Planet was rejected by Eisner because Paramount Pictures was developing a Star Trek sequel with a Treasure Island angle (that went eventually unproduced). The next morning, Katzenberg approached Clements and asked him to expand his initial treatment. With The Little Mermaid in production, in 1986, Clements and Musker were later joined by Off-Broadway musical composers Howard Ashman and Alan Menken who collaborated on the song and musical score.

Released in November 1989, The Little Mermaid was praised as a milestone in rebirth of Disney animation by film critics and collected a domestic gross of $84 million, cumulatively receiving $184.2 million worldwide. When The Litle Mermaid was finished, Clements and Musker re-developed their idea for Treasure Planet, but the studio was still uninterested. Instead, the two directors were offered three projects in development: Swan Lake, King of the Jungle, and Aladdin. The directors chose Aladdin because they thought the story would suit a wackier, faster-paced, and more contemporary mood than that found in then-recent Disney animated films.

Working from Ashman and Menken's treatment and musical score, the two delivered a story reel to Katzenberg in April 1991, which was strongly disapproved of. Jettisoning multiple characters and story ideas and adding Ted Elliott and Terry Rossio as co-screenwriters, the production team restructured the entire story in eight days. Released in November 1992, Aladdin received positive reviews from critics, and became the first animated film to gross over $200 million domestically.

Following Aladdin, Clements, along with Musker, resumed their work on Treasure Planet, which was again turned down by Katzenberg in 1993, who disapproved of setting the adaptation of a classic adventure tale in outer space. A deal was struck with the two directors to create another commercial film before he would approve Treasure Planet. Rejecting projects in development such as Don Quixote, The Odyssey, and Around the World in Eighty Days, they were later informed of animator Joe Haidar's pitch for a Hercules feature, and signed onto the project. During production on Hercules, in 1995, Clements and Musker signed a seven-year contract deal with the studio which stipulated following Hercules, the studio would produce Treasure Planet or another project of their choosing.

Treasure Planet was eventually approved for production and subsequently released in 2002 to mixed critical reception. The film performed poorly at the box office, costing $140 million to produce while earning only $38 million in the United States and Canada and just shy of $110 million worldwide. Despite this, it was nominated for Best Animated Feature at the 75th Academy Awards, marking his first Academy Award nomination.

After the release of Treasure Planet, Clements and Musker later inherited Fraidy Cat, which was originally a project developed by Dutch animation director Piet Kroon. However, David Stainton, then-president of Walt Disney Feature Animation, refused to green-light the project, which was followed with Clements and Musker's resignation from Disney in September 2005. When John Lasseter was appointed chief creative officer over Disney Feature Animation in February 2006, he invited Clements and Musker back to Disney to oversee production on The Frog Princess, and were officially confirmed as directors in the following July. Later retitled The Princess and the Frog (2009), the film received positive reviews and grossed $267 million worldwide.

After directing The Princess and the Frog, Clements and Musker started working on an adaptation of Terry Pratchett's Mort, but obtaining the film rights prevented them from continuing with the project. To avoid similar problems, they pitched three new ideas, where by 2011, the two directors started developing the film based on an original idea. In late 2012, Clements and Musker announced that they will be directing a new film in the future, but would not disclose further production details. In July 2013, it was revealed that the film, titled Moana, would be "a Polynesian tale involving the island folk and the idols made famous the world over". On November 10, 2014, Disney confirmed Moana would be released on November 23, 2016. At the 89th Academy Awards, Moana received two Oscar nominations for Best Animated Film and Best Original Song ("How Far I'll Go").

In June 2025, at the Annecy Film Festival, it was announced that Clements had come out of retirement and was returning to Disney Animation Studios to serve in an advisory role.

== Legacy ==
Clement's short film Shades of Sherlock Holmes was preserved by the Academy Film Archive in 2012.

Alongside longtime collaborator John Musker, Clements received the 2017 Art Directors Guild William Cameron Menzies Award.

== Personal life ==
Clements has been married to his wife Tamara Lee Glumace, since February 25, 1989.

== Filmography ==
=== Feature films ===
| Year | Film | Credited as | | | | | |
| Year | Film | Director | Writer | Producer | Animator | Other | Notes |
|---|---|---|---|---|---|---|---|
| 1977 | The Rescuers | No | No | No | Character | No | uncredited |
| 1977 | Pete's Dragon | No | No | No | Character | No | |
| 1981 | The Fox and the Hound | No | No | No | Supervising | No | |
| 1985 | The Black Cauldron | No | No | No | No | Yes | Additional story contributor |
| 1986 | The Great Mouse Detective | Yes | Story | No | No | No | |
| 1989 | The Little Mermaid | Yes | Yes | No | No | Yes | Various voices - uncredited |
| 1992 | Aladdin | Yes | Screenplay | Yes | No | Yes | Additional voices - uncredited |
| 1997 | Hercules | Yes | Screenplay | Yes | No | No | |
| 2002 | Treasure Planet | Yes | Yes | Yes | No | Yes | Developer - uncredited |
| 2008 | Bolt | No | No | No | No | Yes | Special thanks |
| 2009 | The Princess and the Frog | Yes | Yes | No | No | No | |
| 2014 | Big Hero 6 | No | No | No | No | Yes | Creative leadership |
| 2016 | Zootopia | No | No | No | No | Yes | Creative leadership |
| 2016 | Moana | Yes | Story | No | No | Yes | Creative leadership |
| 2018 | Ralph Breaks the Internet | No | No | No | No | Yes | Creative leadership |
| 2019 | Aladdin | No | No | No | No | Yes | "Based on" credit |
| 2019 | Frozen II | No | No | No | No | Yes | Creative leadership |
| 2023 | The Little Mermaid | No | No | No | No | Yes | "Based on" credit |
| 2026 | Moana | No | No | No | No | Yes | "Based on" credit |

==== Short films ====
| Year | Film | Credited as | | | | | | | | |
| Year | Film | Director | Writer | Producer | Animator | Layout artist | Background designer | Other | Role | Notes |
|---|---|---|---|---|---|---|---|---|---|---|
| 1972 | Shades of Sherlock Holmes | Yes | Yes | Yes | Yes | Yes | Yes | Yes | Sherlock Holmes | Music arrangement |
| 1982 | Luau | No | No | No | No | No | No | Yes | | Special thanks |
| 2008 | Jack's Gift | No | No | No | No | No | No | Yes | Paramedic | |
| 2017 | Gone Fishing | Yes | No | No | No | No | No | No | | |

==== Documentaries ====
| Year | Title | Role |
|---|---|---|
| 2007 | The Pixar Story | Himself |
| 2009 | Waking Sleeping Beauty | Himself |
| 2018 | Howard | Himself |
| 2020 | Into the Unknown: Making Frozen II | Himself |

== Awards and nominations ==
| Ceremony | Category | Recipient | Result |
|---|---|---|---|
| Edgar Allan Poe Award | Best Motion Picture | The Great Mouse Detective | Nominated |
| Los Angeles Film Critics Association Award | Best Animated Film | The Little Mermaid | Won |
| Los Angeles Film Critics Association Award | Best Animated Film | Aladdin | Won |
| Annie Awards | Best Individual Achievement: Directing in a Feature Production | Hercules | Won |
| Annie Awards | Best Individual Achievement: Producing in a Feature Production | Hercules | Won |
| Annie Awards | Best Animated Feature | Hercules | Nominated |
| Los Angeles Film Critics Association Award | Best Animated Film | Hercules | Won |
| Academy Awards | Best Animated Feature | Treasure Planet | Nominated |
| Academy Awards | Best Animated Feature | The Princess and the Frog | Nominated |
| African-American Film Critics Association Award | Best Screenplay | The Princess and the Frog | Won |
| Academy Awards | Best Animated Feature | Moana | Nominated |
| Alliance of Women Film Journalists | Best Animated Feature | Moana | Nominated |
| Seattle Film Critics Awards | Best Animated Feature | Moana | Nominated |

== Collaborations ==
John Musker and Ron Clements have cast certain actors in more than one of their films.

| | The Great Mouse Detective | The Little Mermaid | Aladdin | Hercules | Treasure Planet | The Princess and the Frog |
|---|---|---|---|---|---|---|
| Charlie Adler | | X mark | X mark | | | |
| Jack Angel | | X mark | X mark | X mark | X mark | |
| Rodger Bumpass | | | | X mark | X mark | |
| Corey Burton | | | X mark | X mark | X mark | X mark |
| Jim Cummings | | | X mark | X mark | | X mark |
| Keith David | | | | X mark | | X mark |
| Mona Marshall | | | | | X mark | X mark |
| Debi Derryberry | | | X mark | X mark | | |
| Paddi Edwards | | X mark | | X mark | | |
| Jennifer Darling | | X mark | X mark | X mark | X mark | X mark |
| Sherry Lynn | | X mark | X mark | X mark | X mark | |
| Patrick Pinney | | X mark | X mark | X mark | X mark | |
| Bob Bergen | | | | X mark | X mark | |
| Phil Proctor | | | X mark | X mark | X mark | X mark |
| Frank Welker | X mark | X mark | X mark | X mark | | X mark |

== Bibliography ==
- Hulett, Steve (December 4, 2014). Mouse In Transition: An Insider's Look at Disney Feature Animation. Theme Park Press. ISBN 978-1941500248.
- Stewart, James (2005). DisneyWar. New York: Simon and Schuster. ISBN 0-684-80993-1.
- Thomas, Bob (March 7, 1997). Disney's Art of Animation: From Mickey Mouse To Hercules. Disney Editions. ISBN 978-0786862412.
