= The Italian Job (2003 film) =

2003 American heist action film by F. Gary Gray

- Theatrical release poster
- Directed by: F. Gary Gray
- Screenplay by: Donna Powers; Wayne Powers
- Based on: The Italian Job; 1969 film by Troy Kennedy Martin
- Produced by: Donald De Line
- Starring: Mark Wahlberg; Charlize Theron; Edward Norton; Seth Green; Jason Statham; Mos Def; Franky G; Donald Sutherland
- Cinematography: Wally Pfister
- Edited by: Richard Francis-Bruce; Christopher Rouse
- Music by: John Powell
- Production company: De Line Pictures
- Distributed by: Paramount Pictures
- Release dates: May 11, 2003 (Tribeca Film Festival); May 30, 2003 (United States)
- Running time: 111 minutes
- Country: United States
- Language: English
- Budget: $60 million
- Box office: $176.1 million

The Italian Job is a 2003 American heist action film directed by F. Gary Gray with a screenplay by Donna Powers and Wayne Powers. The film stars an ensemble cast consisting of Mark Wahlberg, Charlize Theron, Edward Norton, Jason Statham, Seth Green, Mos Def, and Donald Sutherland. Inspired by the 1969 British film, but with an original story, the plot follows a motley crew of thieves who plan to steal gold from a former associate who double-crossed them. Despite the shared title, the plot and characters of this film differ from its source material; Gray described the film as "an homage to the original."

Most of the film was shot on location in Venice and Los Angeles, where canals and streets, respectively, were temporarily shut down during principal photography. Distributed by Paramount Pictures, The Italian Job was theatrically released in the United States on May 30, 2003, and grossed over $176 million worldwide. Critical response was generally positive, with publications comparing it favorably to the original film while highlighting the action sequences, performances of the cast and humor. A sequel, The Brazilian Job, was reportedly in development in 2004, but was subsequently cancelled. A video game based on the film was released in 2003.

== Plot ==
Professional safecracker John Bridger's team has plans to steal $35 million worth of gold bars from a safe in Venice from Italian gangsters who had stolen it weeks earlier. Professional fixer Charlie Croker, computer expert Lyle or "Napster", wheelman Handsome Rob, explosives expert Left Ear, and inside man Steve comprise the team. Although the heist is successful, Steve double-crosses them as they drive towards Austria with the bullion; with another crew, he takes it for himself and kills John. Rob drives the van over the bridge into the water to protect the others, using air tanks from the heist to stay alive. Steve leaves them for dead.

A year later in Philadelphia, Charlie finds Steve, under a new identity, laundering the gold through Ukrainian jeweler Yevhen to finance his lavish lifestyle in Los Angeles. Charlie gathers the team, and also recruits John's daughter Stella, a skilled private safecracker, offering her the chance to avenge her father's death. They stake out Steve's mansion, and Stella, disguised as a cable technician, maps out its interior and determines the location of Steve's safe containing the bullion. Unaware of Stella's identity, Steve asks her out on a date. The plan is to blow the safe while Steve is away on his supposed date, using three heavily modified Mini Coopers to transport the gold out of the mansion. Supplier Skinny Pete gets the explosives and mechanic Wrench modifies the cars.

On Steve's last visit to Yevhen, Yevhen accidentally reveals that he knows about the Venice heist, and Steve shoots him dead to cover his tracks. Mashkov, the leader of a Ukrainian crime family and Yevhen's cousin, traces the gold back to Skinny Pete via Yevhen's ex-employee Vance.

On the night of the planned heist, the crew discovers that Steve's neighbors are having a party, forcing them to abort as the explosives would draw attention. Stella meets Steve anyway, but inadvertently gives away her identity by using her dad's catchphrase. The team arrives to protect her, and Steve taunts them as he says he still has the upper hand.

Aware that Charlie intends to steal it back, Steve decides to move the gold to Mexico City. His plan, which involves transporting the gold via armored car from his L.A. home to a private plane at LAX, is overheard by Napster using a phone tap. Charlie and his gang make a new plan to steal the gold en route to the airport by hijacking the city's traffic control system to force the armored car to a planned spot where they will execute the heist.

On the day, they are surprised when three armored trucks leave Steve's mansion, but Napster determines which one carries the bullion and manipulates the traffic accordingly. As Steve is monitoring the transport by helicopter, they maneuver the truck to the target spot and detonate explosives to drop the part of the road with the truck into the subway tunnel below. Opening the truck, they find the gold in a different safe from the one Stella saw earlier. After initially struggling, Stella cracks it open and they divide the $27 million in gold among the three Minis. They race from the subway to the Los Angeles River and through the city, pursued by Steve's henchmen on motorcycles, with Napster creating a green wave to evade traffic.

Stella, Handsome Rob, and Left Ear head to Union Station, while Charlie lures Steve away in his helicopter. Steve tries to kill him by having his helicopter pilot destroy Charlie's Mini, but the helicopter's tail rotor is damaged, grounding it. Steve carjacks a Ford Bronco to follow Charlie to Union Station, where the cars are loaded onto a train car with the help of Wrench. He tries to bribe Wrench to let him in, but finds Charlie and the others waiting. When Steve pulls a gun, demanding the gold back, Mashkov and his armed men disarm him. Charlie explains that he has offered Mashkov part of the gold and Steve in exchange for helping with security protection (it is implied that Skinny Pete put him in touch). Stella punches Steve in the face as revenge. Mashkov then takes him away, implying he intends to not kill him, but rather torture him for killing Yevhen. The group boards the train as it departs to New Orleans, and celebrate in John's honor.

The team uses their share of the gold for their own desired purposes: Handsome Rob purchases an Aston Martin DB7 Volante, getting pulled over by a beautiful policewoman; Left Ear buys a mansion in Andalusia with a room for his shoe collection; Napster buys a high-end stereo with powerful speakers; and Charlie takes John's advice about finding someone he wants to spend the rest of his life with, and he and Stella travel to Venice together.

== Cast ==
- Mark Wahlberg as Charlie "Hustle" Croker, the team's leader, master thief and professional fixer. He seeks revenge for the murder of his mentor, John Bridger.
- Charlize Theron as Stella Bridger, John's daughter and a professional safe-cracker. She uses tools and technology to open safes, in contrast to her father, who opened them by feel. She joins the team in order to get revenge on Steve for killing her father.
- Edward Norton as Steve Frazelli, a thief who turned on Charlie's crew and left them for dead after stealing the gold from them.
- Donald Sutherland as John Bridger, Stella's father and safe-cracker who is pulled in by Charlie for one more job.
- Jason Statham as "Handsome" Rob, the team's wheelman and a charming ladies' man.
- Seth Green as Lyle "Napster", the team's computer expert. He claims he is the real inventor of Napster, insisting that Shawn Fanning stole the idea from him. Fanning appears as himself in a cameo role.
- Mos Def as Gilligan "Left Ear", the team's demolition and explosives expert.
- Franky G as Wrench, a mechanic whom Rob contacts to engineer the Minis to carry the gold. He later joins the team for the heist.
- Boris Lee Krutonog as Yevhen, a jewelry store owner with ties to the Ukrainian mafia. He is a conspiracy theorist who is buying the stolen gold bars from Steve.
- Aleksander Krupa as Mashkov, a member of the Ukrainian mafia family and Yevhen's cousin. He operates a junkyard as a base as he searches for Yevhen's killer.

== Production ==
=== Development ===
Neal Purvis and Robert Wade wrote a draft of a remake of the 1969 British crime film The Italian Job which was rejected by Paramount. Screenwriting team Donna and Wayne Powers were subsequently commissioned to write a remake. The duo viewed the original film, which neither had seen before, only once "because [they] wanted to get a sense of what it was about" in regards to its tone. Over the course of two years and through 18 drafts, they developed a screenplay which was described by director F. Gary Gray as "inspired by the original." Gray, Powers and Powers, and executive producer James Dyer identified the most prominent similarities as the trio of Mini Coopers used by the thieves, as well as the titular heist involving the theft of gold bullion. Some sequences of the film were storyboarded and previsualized by Gray before production began.

=== Casting ===
Gray had been interested in working with Mark Wahlberg since seeing his performance in Boogie Nights (1997). After reading the script for The Italian Job, Gray contacted Wahlberg, who "fell in love with it" after reading it himself. In April 2002, Wahlberg's casting was officially confirmed. He had to drop out a role in S.W.A.T. (2003) in favor of the film. Green was also attracted to the project because of the script. Theron was Gray's first choice for the character of Stella Bridger, and Wahlberg also recommended her for the role. She spent time with a safecracker in preparation for the role. Gray's casting director Sheila Jaffe suggested Statham for the role of getaway driver Handsome Rob, and Gray agreed with her choice. According to co-star Seth Green, Norton took the role of Steve Frazelli under duress, due to a contractual obligation he had to fulfill to Paramount. While all parties said he behaved professionally on the film, Norton was furious about being forced to make the film, and was quoted as saying of the film, "My real fans should give this a miss." Wahlberg, Theron, and Statham attended special driver's training sessions at Willow Springs International Motorsports Park for nearly a month during pre-production.

=== Filming ===
Gray and cinematographer Wally Pfister worked together to develop a visual style for the film before production began. They viewed car commercials and magazine photographs, as well as chase sequences from The French Connection (1971), Ronin (1998), and The Bourne Identity (2002) as visual references. Pfister wanted "dark textures and undertones and strong contrast;" he collaborated with production designer Charlie Wood on the color palette, and the two would confer with Gray on their ideas. It was Wally Pfister's first experience using the Super 35 format since Paramount preferred that the film not be shot in the anamorphic format, despite Pfister's wishes to do so. However, Gray still wanted a widescreen aspect ratio, just like the original, so they chose to shoot the film in Super 35 for a 2.39:1 aspect ratio. Once principal photography began, Gray frequently utilized dollies, as well as Steadicams and a Technocrane, to keep the cameras almost constantly moving.

Most of The Italian Job was shot on location, at sites Pfister scouted over 12 weeks during pre-production, but some scenes were filmed on sets. The Venice building where the film's opening heist sequence takes place, the van from which the thieves survey Steve Frazelli's mansion, a hotel room, and the LACMTA Red Line subway tunnel were sets constructed at Downey Studios in California. For the scene in which an armored truck falls through Hollywood Boulevard and into the subway tunnel below, Pfister set up seven cameras to capture the vehicle's ~30 foot (9.1 m) descent. Three hundred cars were used to simulate the traffic jam at the intersection of Hollywood and Highland, which was controlled by the production crew for a week. Three of the 32 custom-built Mini Coopers used during principal photography were fitted with electric motors since combustion engines were not allowed in the subway tunnels, where some scenes were shot. Other Mini Coopers were modified to allow for camera placement on and inside the vehicles. The director remarked that "[the Mini Coopers are] part of the cast."

Gray wanted the film to be as realistic as possible; accordingly, the actors did most of their own stunts, and computer-generated imagery was used very sparingly. The second unit, under director Alexander Witt and cinematographer Josh Bleibtreu, filmed establishing shots, the Venice canal chase sequence, and the Los Angeles chase sequence over a period of 40 days. Filming on location posed some challenges. The opening heist sequence in Venice, Italy, was strictly monitored by the local authorities, due to the high speeds of the boats. The frigid temperatures at Passo Fedaia in the Italian Alps created problems during production: "The guns would jam, and if you could imagine not being able to walk 40 feet with a bottle of water without it freezing, those are the conditions we had to work in," Gray remarked. Pedestrians had to be allowed to use the sidewalks of Hollywood Boulevard between takes. Also, scenes which took place on freeways and city streets were only filmed on weekends.

== Release ==
=== Box office performance ===
The Italian Job premiered at the Tribeca Film Festival on May 11, 2003, and was theatrically released in the United States on May 30, 2003, along with Finding Nemo and Wrong Turn. In its opening weekend, the film grossed $19.5 million, ranking at #3 behind Finding Nemo and Bruce Almighty. Paramount re-released the film on August 29, and by the time its theatrical release closed in November, the film had grossed $106.1 million in the United States and Canada, and $69.9 million in other territories, for a worldwide total of $176.1 million. It was the highest-grossing film produced by Paramount in 2003.

=== Critical response ===
On Rotten Tomatoes, The Italian Job holds an approval rating of 72% based on 178 reviews with an average rating of 6.4/10. The site's critics consensus reads, "Despite some iffy plot elements, The Italian Job succeeds in delivering an entertaining modern take on the original 1969 heist film, thanks to a charismatic cast." Metacritic calculated an average score of 68 out of 100 based on 37 critics, indicating "generally favorable reviews". Audiences polled by CinemaScore gave the film an average grade of "B+" on an A+ to F scale.

Stephanie Zacharek, writing for Salon.com, liked the reinvention of the plot and the style and execution of the action sequences, specifically those involving the trio of Mini Coopers, which she wrote were the stars of the film. BBC reviewer Stella Papamichael gave The Italian Job 4 stars out of 5, and wrote that the "revenge plot adds wallop lacking in the original." Los Angeles Times reviewer Kevin Thomas praised the opening Venice heist sequence and the characterization of each of the thieves, but felt that the Los Angeles heist sequence was "arguably stretched out a little too long." Roger Ebert gave the film 3 stars out of 4, writing that the film was "two hours of mindless escapism on a relatively skilled professional level." Mick LaSalle of the San Francisco Chronicle concurred, describing The Italian Job as pure but smart entertainment "plotted and executed with invention and humor." Reviewer James Berardinelli also gave the film 3 stars out of 4, and said that Gray had discovered the right recipe to do a heist movie: "keep things moving, develop a nice rapport between the leads, toss in the occasional surprise, and top with a sprinkling of panache." Variety's Robert Koehler compared The Italian Job to The Score (2001), another "finely tuned heist pic" which also featured Edward Norton in a similar role.

David Denby, writing for The New Yorker, praised Norton's performance, as well as Seth Green and Mos Def, and the lack of digital effects in the action sequences. Owen Gleiberman of Entertainment Weekly gave the film a B− grade, comparing it positively to the 2000 remake of Gone in 60 Seconds, as well as the 2001 remake of Ocean's Eleven. New York Daily News reviewer Jack Mathews gave The Italian Job 2.5 stars out of 4, writing that the action sequences and plot twists were a "vast improvement" from the original, and that the Los Angeles heist sequence was "clever and preposterous". Mike Clark of USA Today also questioned the probability of the Los Angeles heist sequence and wrote that the film was "a lazy and in-name-only remake," giving it 2 stars out of 4. Peter Travers, writing for Rolling Stone, gave The Italian Job 1 star out of 4, describing the film as "a tricked-out remake of a heist flick that was already flat and formulaic in 1969." Travers enjoyed the comic relief in Green's and Def's characters, and added that Norton's was "[t]he most perversely magnetic performance" outside of the Mini Coopers, but felt that there was a lack of logic in the film.

=== Home media ===
The Italian Job was released on DVD and VHS by Paramount Home Entertainment October 7, 2003, and includes five bonus features on different aspects of the film's production, in addition to six deleted scenes. As of December 2003, the video sold 3,28 million copies earning a profit of over 57.7 million dollars. It was released on HD DVD August 8, 2006 and on Blu-ray Disc October 24, 2006.

=== Accolades ===
Award	Category	Recipients	Result	Ref.
AAFCA Awards 2003	Best Picture		Nominated	
AAFCA Awards 2003	Special Achievement Award	F. Gary Gray	Won	
American Black Film Festival	Best Director	F. Gary Gray	Won	
Artios Award	Best Casting for Feature Film, Drama	Sheila Jaffe	Nominated	
ASCAP Film and Television Music Awards	Top Box Office Films	John Powell	Won	
BET Awards	Best Actor	Yasiin Bey	Nominated	
Black Reel Awards	Best Film	Donald De Line	Nominated	
Black Reel Awards	Film: Best Director	F. Gary Gray	Won	
Black Reel Awards	Film: Best Supporting Actor	Yasiin Bey	Nominated	
Santa Barbara International Film Festival	Outstanding Performer of the Year	Charlize Theron	Won	
Saturn Award	Best Action or Adventure Film		Nominated	
Taurus World Stunt Awards	Best speciality stunt	Clay Cullen, Michael Caines, Jean Paul Ruggiero, and Mike Massa	Won	

In April 2009, IGN named the film's Los Angeles chase sequence one of the top 10 car chases of the 21st century.

=== Analysis ===
Criminologist Nicole Rafter saw The Italian Job as part of a revival of the heist film around the start of the 21st century, along with The Thomas Crown Affair (1999) and Ocean's Eleven (2001), both of which were also remakes of 1960s heist films. In describing his theory of a "team film" genre, film scholar Dr. Jeremy Strong writes that The Italian Job could be categorized as such, along with The Magnificent Seven (1960), The Great Escape (1963), The Dirty Dozen (1967), and more recently The Usual Suspects (1995) and Mission: Impossible (1996). He states that

a team film involves a group working towards a particular objective. However, goal-orientation is a widely shared plot attribute of many texts and genres and it is also the case that the overwhelming majority of films involve a plurality of interacting characters. An element that distinguishes the team film then is that a heightened significance is afforded to the group as the means by which a given objective is attempted. [...] From film to film there is variation in the extent to which particular central characters may determine events and take up screen time but team films are recognizable by their insistence upon the relationship between group and goal.

Strong additionally makes a direct comparison between The Italian Job and Mission: Impossible, citing the plot device of "a first task that elucidates the roles and skills of team members but which is sabotaged by betrayal, necessitating a re-constitution of the team."

The use of BMW's then-new line of retro-styled Minis in the film was mentioned by critics and business analysts alike as a prime example of modern product placement, or more specifically "brand integration". Film critic Joe Morgenstern called The Italian Job "the best car commercial ever". Zacharek and Mathews both noted the cars' prominence in their reviews of the film, also writing that their presence served as a connection to the 1969 film upon which it was based. BusinessWeek reported in April 2004 that sales of the Mini in 2003—the year in which The Italian Job was theatrically released—had increased 22 percent over the previous year.

== Possible sequel ==
There are a couple of scripts that have been written, but in the last six years since we made [The Italian Job], Paramount's hierarchy has changed hands four times and it's never seemed to be a priority for the studio to make the movie.... There's enough of a fan outcry for it, but we just haven't been able to get the studio to greenlight it.

— Seth Green on the proposed sequel, September 7, 2008

A sequel to The Italian Job, tentatively titled The Brazilian Job, was in development by the summer of 2004, but has since faced multiple delays. Principal photography was initially slated to begin in March 2005, with a projected release date in November or December 2005. However, the script was never finalized, and the release date was pushed back to sometime in 2006, and later summer 2007.

Writer David Twohy approached Paramount Pictures with an original screenplay entitled The Wrecking Crew, and though the studio reportedly liked the idea, they thought it would work better as a sequel to The Italian Job. Gray was slated to return as director, as well as most, if not all, of the original cast. At least two drafts of the script had been written by August 2007, but the project had not been greenlit.

In March 2008, in an interview, Jason Statham said that "somebody should just erase it from IMDb.... and put it back on there when it's fully due and ready. [...] It's one of those things that's just sitting around." Producer Donald De Line revealed in June that a script for The Brazilian Job had been developed and budgeted, but "a lot of things were happening with various management changes and it got tabled." Describing its story, he said it "starts in Brazil, the set up is in Rio and the picture moves to Belgium where there’s something involving diamonds." However, Green stated that September that the sequel was unlikely in the near future.

On March 9, 2009, De Line said that "[we] have a version at Paramount that we're talking very serious about", additionally mentioning that the cast was interested in the project. Neal Purvis and Robert Wade had been working on a draft of the sequel that year. The Daily Record reported in September that Theron was signed up for the film. That October, Gray said that he enjoyed making The Italian Job and hoped that he would still be interested in directing the sequel if the script became finalized and mentioned that it would be dependent upon scheduling.

In January 2010, Twohy was quoted in an interview as saying "The Brazilian Job probably isn't happening. I wrote it years ago, and they just keep rolling it over on IMDb. Paramount—what can I say?" When asked about the sequel that June, Green said "The Brazilian Job doesn't exist actually" and called it a "wonderful myth of IMDb." However, the next month, Mark Wahlberg said that sequel production was "active" again.

In September 2026, it was announced that Paul Feig would help develop a sequel.

== See also ==
- 2003 in film
- Players – a 2012 Indian action thriller heist film, a remake of 1969 classical film
- 2 Fast 2 Furious – another film released in the same year involving cars
- Fast Five
- Backlot Stunt Coaster – the name of three roller coasters at three former Paramount theme parks which were originally themed to and named after this film
