= African-American Film Critics Association Awards 2003 =

Annual US film awards ceremony

1st African-American Film Critics Association Awards
- Date: December 22, 2003

Highlights
- Best Picture: The Lord of the Rings: The Return of the King

The 1st African-American Film Critics Association Awards, honoring the best in filmmaking of 2003, were given on 22 December 2003.

== Top 10 films ==
1. The Lord of the Rings: The Return of the King
2. Lost in Translation
3. In America
4. Dirty Pretty Things
5. The Last Samurai
6. Finding Nemo
7. The Italian Job
8. Tupac: Resurrection
9. Cidade de Deus (City of God)
10. Mystic River

== Winners ==
- Special Achievement Award:
  - F. Gary Gray - The Italian Job
