= African-American Film Critics Association =

Organization

- Abbreviation: AAFCA
- Formation: 2003; 23 years ago
- Type: Film criticism
- Location: New York City, New York
- Official language: English
- Website: www.aafca.com

The African-American Film Critics Association (AAFCA) is the world's largest group of Black film critics that gives various annual awards for excellence in film and television. It was founded in 2003 in New York City. In 2023 Variety stated that since it started, "the organization’s purpose was clear: to amplify Black voices in film criticism and arts entertainment journalism from across the African Diaspora."

== History ==
The association was founded in 2003 by Gil L. Robertson IV and Shawn Edwards. They met in New York City after a press junket, and were both concerned with the lack of themed stories in the film industry from the African Diaspora. In several weeks, the two of them were supported by other colleagues in their plan to create an association of black film critics. They drafted the initial outline for the association while in Los Angeles. In December 2003, the African-American Film Critics Association officially announced the start of its organization, and released its first "Top Ten List."

In 2019, the association began giving awards to television shows in the spring. AAFCA also joined with the Asian American Journalists Association (AAJA), GALECA: The Society of LGBTQ Entertainment Critics, the Latino Entertainment Journalists Association (LEJA), and the Online Association of Female Film Critics (OAFFC) to form the Critics Groups for Equality in Media to "help foster greater diversity in entertainment journalism" through various initiatives including a "watchdog" grading system.

== Mission ==
The association actively reviews cinema overall, but highlights films about the African-American experience. The AAFCA produces awareness for films with widespread appeal to the black community while stressing the importance of films produced, written, directed and starring people of African descent. Members also involve themselves in advocacy work for students interested in film journalism and criticism.

The AAFCA also curates resources guides and lists of historically or culturally significant black films.

The organization gives out awards for a variety of categories. Best Feature Film, Best Documentary, Best Actress, Best Actor, Best Supporting Actress, Best Supporting Actor, Best Director, Best Foreign Film, Best Screenplay, and Best Original Song. The AAFCA also gives out an award for Special Achievement. Honorees for this award are chosen by committee on the basis of their lifetime achievements. Past recipients of the Special Achievement award included Jamie Foxx, John Singleton, Edward James Olmos, Ruth E. Carter, Pearlena Igbokwe, Channing Dungey, Sherry Lansing, and Spike Lee.

== Membership ==
Members of AAFCA are a geographically diverse range of journalists who cover every genre of film and represent numerous mediums such as television, radio broadcast, online, and print. Membership into the AAFCA is by invitation only, with approval of the Board of Governors.

There are three classifications for membership in the AAFCA; active member, associate member, and student. An active member is one who writes regular film criticism for a medium with a minimum of 24 to qualify and must be based in the United States. Once accepted the active member must have a constant presence in the critique of commercial American films. An associate member is one who writes regular film coverage for a medium and must express their affiliation with an established media body by providing a written letter on company letterhead. Finally, a minimum of twelve samples of film critique is needed for consideration. A student member is one who is attending an accredited college or university and is majoring in journalism or broadcast media.

== Special programs ==
Panel discussions led by an AAFCA member are also offered by the association. One such panel is about the concept of diversity in modern films. It accentuates an understanding that each individual is special and different. The differences may run along lines of race, ethnicity, gender socio-economic status, physical abilities, sexual orientation, age, physical abilities, religious beliefs, political beliefs, or other ideologies. The panel explores the role cinema plays in understanding one another and to go beyond a simplistic message of tolerance to one of celebrating and acceptance of the plentiful dimensions of diversity in every person.

Another panel entitled "What Every Filmmaker Needs to Know about Film Critics", explores the important areas filmmakers must know when making a film. Film critics influence the success and failure of a film through their reviews so this panel attempts to help new filmmakers. It discusses the significance of plot lines and story narrative in films, the deliberations that must go into casting a film, and the crucial technical and imaginative elements filmmakers should reflect on before presenting their work to the public.

The final program offered by the AAFCA is the Junior Critic Program. Working with the historically black colleges and universities, the AAFCA selects four journalism students who demonstrate a talent and/or interest in film to cover a film promotional event as a working journalist. The selection process for the students is based on academic or department recommendations and an interview with an AAFCA member. The representative chaperones the selected student for the media event and then provides assistance with the final report.

In 2017, the AAFCA produced a series of screenings and panels honoring the late Prince at libraries and museums in Kansas City, Denver, Atlanta and Broward County, Florida.

In 2023, the AAFCA partnered with the British Academy of Film and Television Arts to present "The Struggle to be Seen" a series of panels on challenges faced by Black industry professionals.

== 2009 scandal ==
In 2009, the big winner at the African American Film Critics Association was Precious: Based on the Novel "Push" by Sapphire. The adaption won best picture, best director, best screenplay, and best supporting actress. The film's star, Gabourey Sidibe, did not win best actress, in favor of Nicole Beharie from American Violet.

After the awards, gossip blogger Roger Friedman of The Hollywood Reporter reported the tally had been manipulated by the group's president, Gil Robertson IV. Friedman posed that Robertson was to receive a bribe in the form of a donation from the producers affiliated with American Violet.

The issue sparked infighting among the group leading to a splintering. Three founding members of the AAFCA—Shawn Edwards of FOX-TV, Wilson Morales of Blackfilm.com/AOL Blackvoices, and Mike Sargent WBAI-FM/Tor.com—withdrew and created a new group, the Black Film Critics Circle. The new group includes five other former AAFCA members and officially debuted in February 2010. In the founding announcement, the Black Film Critics Circle made known that they were going to "maintain the integrity of a true critics organization".

In a statement released on December 28, 2009, and signed by 15 of the group's members, Robertson denied all accusations related to ballot tampering, and wished any group wanting to further black film appreciation the best. The only evidence to the controversy on the AAFCA website is the inclusion that "Effective January 1, 2010, final tabulations for all AAFCA Award categories will be handled by Beverly Hills accountant W. Steven Temple".

== Executive team ==
- Gil L. Robertson IV – President
- Daryle Lockhart – Vice President, East Coast
- Kathy Williamson – Vice President, West Coast
- Etienne Maurice – Creative Executive

== Advisory board ==
- Russell Williams – Oscar winner; Professor, American University; Co-founder
- Darrell Miller – Fox, Rothschilds, LLP
- Latanya Richardson – Actress, Philanthropist
- W. Stephen Temple – President of Business Affairs Mgmt., Inc
- Ava Duvernay – Filmmaker; President of DVA Media & Marketing
- Vicangelo Bullock – President of NAACP – Beverly Hills/Hollywood
- Asante Bradford – Georgia Film, Music, & Digital Entertainment

== Top Ten Films of the Year ==
Year	Winner	Top Films of the Year
2003	The Lord of the Rings: The Return of the King	City of God; Dirty Pretty Things; Finding Nemo; In America; The Italian Job; The Last Samurai; Lost in Translation; Mystic River; Tupac: Resurrection
2004	Ray	The Aviator; Baadasssss!; Brother to Brother; Collateral; Finding Neverland; Hotel Rwanda; Million Dollar Baby; Sideways; Woman Thou Art Loosed
2005	Crash	Batman Begins; Brokeback Mountain; Capote; The Constant Gardener; Good Night, and Good Luck; Hustle & Flow; North Country; Syriana; Walk the Line
2006	Dreamgirls	Akeelah and the Bee; Bobby; Catch a Fire; The Departed; The Devil Wears Prada; Idlewild; Inside Man; The Last King of Scotland; The Pursuit of Happyness
2007	The Great Debaters	American Gangster; Gone Baby Gone; Juno; Michael Clayton; No Country for Old Men; Sweeney Todd: The Demon Barber of Fleet Street; Talk to Me; There Will Be Blood; Things We Lost in the Fire
2008	The Dark Knight	Cadillac Records; The Curious Case of Benjamin Button; Doubt; Iron Man; Milk; Miracle at St. Anna; The Secret Life of Bees; Seven Pounds; Slumdog Millionaire
2009	Precious	American Violet; Goodbye Solo; Good Hair; The Hurt Locker; Medicine for Melancholy; Michael Jackson's This Is It; The Princess and the Frog; Up; Up in the Air
2010	The Social Network	Black Swan; Blood Done Sign My Name; The Fighter; For Colored Girls; Frankie and Alice; Get Low; Inception; The King's Speech; Night Catches Us
2011	The Tree of Life	A Better Life; The Descendants; Drive; The Help; Moneyball; My Week with Marilyn; Pariah; Rampart; Shame
2012	Zero Dark Thirty	Argo; Beasts of the Southern Wild; Django Unchained; Les Misérables; Life of Pi; Lincoln; Middle of Nowhere; Moonrise Kingdom; Think Like a Man
2013	12 Years a Slave	42; American Hustle; Dallas Buyers Club; Fruitvale Station; Gravity; Lee Daniels' The Butler; Mandela: Long Walk to Freedom; Out of the Furnace; Saving Mr. Banks
2014	Selma	The Imitation Game; Theory of Everything; Birdman; Belle; Top Five; Unbroken; Dear White People; Get On Up; Black or White
2015	Straight Outta Compton	Creed; Mad Max: Fury Road; Beasts of No Nation; The Martian; 3 1/2 Minutes and Dope; Chi-Raq; Carol; The Big Short; The Danish Girl
2016	Moonlight	Fences; Hidden Figures; Lion; La La Land; The Birth of a Nation; Loving; Manchester by the Sea; Hell or High Water; Queen of Katwe
2017	Get Out	Three Billboards Outside Ebbing, Missouri; Coco; Girls Trip; Detroit; Call Me by Your Name; The Shape of Water; Gook; Crown Heights; Marshall
2018	Black Panther	If Beale Street Could Talk; The Hate U Give; A Star Is Born; Quincy; Roma; Blindspotting; The Favourite; Sorry to Bother You; Widows
2019	Us	Dolemite Is My Name; Just Mercy; Clemency; The Irishman; Queen & Slim; Waves; Parasite; Atlantics; The Farewell; Harriet
2022	The Harder They Fall	King Richard; Respect; The Tragedy of Macbeth; Passing; Belfast; Who We Are: A Chronicle of Racism in America; House of Gucci; The Power of the Dog; West Side Story
2023	The Woman King	Black Panther: Wakanda Forever; Till; Sidney; Emancipation; Glass Onion: A Knives Out Mystery; The Inspection; Causeway; Everything Everywhere All at Once; Wendell & Wild
2024	American Fiction	Origin; The Color Purple; Oppenheimer; Past Lives; Spider-Man: Across the Spider-Verse; Poor Things; Anatomy of a Fall; Killers of the Flower Moon; Barbie
2025	Nickel Boys	Sing Sing; The Piano Lesson; Gladiator II; Wicked; Emilia Pérez; Albany Road; The Fire Inside; Exhibiting Forgiveness; Dahomey

== Awards ==
- AAFCA Awards 2003
- AAFCA Awards 2004
- AAFCA Awards 2005
- AAFCA Awards 2006
- AAFCA Awards 2007
- AAFCA Awards 2008
- AAFCA Awards 2009
- AAFCA Awards 2010
- AAFCA Awards 2011
- AAFCA Awards 2012
- AAFCA Awards 2013
- AAFCA Awards 2014
- AAFCA Awards 2015
- AAFCA Awards 2016
- AAFCA Awards 2017
- AAFCA Awards 2018

== Works cited ==
- Barboza, Craigh. John Singleton: Interviews. Jackson: U.P. of Mississippi, 2009. ISBN 1-60473-116-8
