= Moana (2016 film) =

2016 animated Disney film

- Theatrical release poster
- Directed by: John Musker; Ron Clements
- Screenplay by: Jared Bush
- Story by: Ron Clements; John Musker; Chris Williams; Don Hall; Pamela Ribon; Aaron Kandell Jordan Kandell
- Produced by: Osnat Shurer
- Starring: Dwayne Johnson; Auliʻi Cravalho
- Cinematography: Rob Dressel (layout); Adolph Lusinsky (lightning)
- Edited by: Jeff Draheim
- Music by: Mark Mancina (score and songs); Lin-Manuel Miranda (songs); Opetaia Foaʻi (songs)
- Production company: Walt Disney Animation Studios
- Distributed by: Walt Disney Studios; Motion Pictures (Note: Distributed under the Walt Disney Pictures banner.)
- Release dates: November 14, 2016 (AFI Fest); November 23, 2016 (United States)
- Running time: 107 minutes
- Country: United States
- Language: English
- Budget: $150–175 million
- Box office: $687.2 million

Moana (Note: Also known as Vaiana or Oceania in some markets) is a 2016 American animated musical adventure film produced by Walt Disney Animation Studios and directed by John Musker and Ron Clements from a screenplay by Jared Bush. The film stars Dwayne Johnson and Auliʻi Cravalho in her feature film debut. Its songs were written by Lin-Manuel Miranda, Opetaia Foaʻi, and Mark Mancina, who also composed the score. Set in ancient Polynesia, the film follows Moana (Cravalho), the strong-willed daughter of a village chief, who is chosen by the ocean to restore a mystical relic to the goddess Te Fiti. When a blight threatens her island, she sets sail in search of Maui (Johnson), a legendary demigod, in hopes of saving her people. The screenplay draws inspiration from Polynesian mythology.

Moana premiered at the AFI Fest at the El Capitan Theatre in Los Angeles on November 14, 2016, and was released theatrically in the United States on November 23. The film received positive reviews from critics and was a commercial success, grossing $687 million worldwide. At the 89th Academy Awards, it received nominations for Best Animated Feature and Best Original Song for "How Far I'll Go".

The film later became a major streaming success on Disney+, ranking among the most-watched films in the United States during the early 2020s. A sequel, Moana 2, was released in 2024, with a third film in development. A live-action remake was released in 2026, to negative reviews.

== Plot ==
On the Polynesian island of Motunui, the inhabitants worship the goddess of nature, Te Fiti: a living island who, long ago, brought life to the ocean using a pounamu stone as her heart and the source of her power. One day, Maui, the shape-shifting demigod of the wind and sea and master of wayfinding, stole Te Fiti's heart to give humanity the power of creation. This caused Te Fiti to disintegrate, and Maui was attacked by Te Kā, a volcanic demon. Maui lost both the heart and his magic fish hook to the depths of the sea.

A thousand years later, the ocean chooses Moana, the daughter of Motunui's chief Tui, to return the heart to Te Fiti. Tui and Sina, Moana's parents, try to keep her away from the ocean to prepare her to become the island's chief. Sixteen years later, blight strikes the island, killing vegetation and shrinking the fish catch. Moana suggests going beyond the island's reef with her pet pig, Pua, to find more fish and discover what is happening, but Tui forbids it.

Moana tries to conquer the reef, but is overpowered by the tides and shipwrecked. That afternoon, Moana's grandmother Tala shows her a secret cavern of ships and reveals Motunui's people were voyagers until Maui stole Te Fiti's heart; the ocean was no longer safe without it. Tala explains Te Kā's darkness is destroying the island, but it can be cured if Moana finds Maui and has him restore the heart of Te Fiti. Having been given the heart by the ocean, Tala gives it to Moana. Tala later becomes gravely ill and tells Moana to find Maui.

Moana sets sail on a camakau from the cavern along with her dimwitted pet rooster, Heihei, who stowed away on it. They are caught in a typhoon and shipwrecked on an island, where she finds Maui, who boasts about his achievements. She demands Maui return the heart, but he refuses and traps her in a cave before leaving on her boat. She escapes and confronts Maui, who reluctantly lets her on the camakau. They are attacked by Kakamora, coconut pirates who seek the heart, but Moana and Maui outwit them.

Moana realizes Maui is no longer a hero since he stole the heart and cursed the world, and convinces him to redeem himself by returning the heart. However, Maui first needs to retrieve his fishhook in Lalotai, the Realm of Monsters, from Tamatoa, a giant coconut crab. While Moana distracts Tamatoa, Maui retrieves his hook, only to find himself unable to control his shape-shifting. He is overpowered by Tamatoa, but Moana's quick thinking allows them to escape with the hook. Maui reveals his first tattoo was earned when his human parents abandoned him as an infant, and the gods, taking pity on him, granted him his powers. After reassurance from Moana, Maui teaches her the art of way-finding, regaining control of his powers, and the two grow closer.

They arrive at Te Fiti's island, only to be attacked by Te Kā. Moana refuses to turn back, resulting in Maui's hook being badly damaged. Unwilling to lose his hook again, Maui abandons Moana, who loses hope and tearfully asks the ocean to find someone else to restore the heart. The ocean obliges and takes the heart, but Tala's spirit appears, inspiring Moana to find her true calling. Moana retrieves the heart and sails back to confront Te Kā. Maui returns, having had a change of heart, and buys Moana time to reach Te Fiti by fighting Te Kā, destroying his hook in the process. Upon being unable to find Te Fiti, Moana realizes Te Kā is Te Fiti, but corrupted without her heart. The ocean clears a path for Moana, allowing her to return the heart to Te Fiti, who heals the ocean and islands of blight. Maui apologizes to Te Fiti, who fixes his hook as well as Moana's boat before falling into a deep sleep and becoming an island.

Moana bids farewell to Maui and Te Fiti, returning home and reuniting with her parents. After placing a shell on top of the stack of stones placed by all previous chiefs, Moana takes up her role as chieftess and wayfinder, leading her people as they resume voyaging, accompanied by Maui.

== Voice cast ==
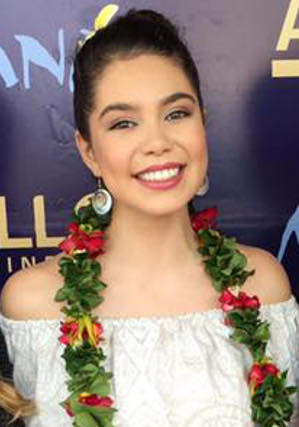
Auliʻi Cravalho at the film's premiere in Samoa in December 2016

- Auliʻi Cravalho as Moana, the curious daughter of village chief Tui and his wife Sina, who is chosen by the ocean to restore the heart of Te Fiti
  - Cravalho reprised her role in the film's Hawaiian-language version
  - Louise Bush as young Moana
- Dwayne Johnson as Maui, a legendary and strong-willed, yet egotistical shape-shifting demigod who sets off with Moana on her journey
- Rachel House as Tala, Tui's mother and Moana's paternal grandmother. Like Moana, Tala shares a passion for the ocean and the two have a very deep bond
  - House reprised her role in the film's Māori-language dub
- Temuera Morrison as Tui, Moana's overprotective father, Sina's husband, and Tala's son. He is chief of Motunui Island
  - Morrison reprised his role in the film's Māori-language dub
  - Christopher Jackson as Tui's singing voice
- Jemaine Clement as Tamatoa, a giant, villainous, treasure-hoarding coconut crab from Lalotai, the Realm of Monsters, and Maui's nemesis
  - Clement reprised his role in the film's Māori-language dub
- Nicole Scherzinger as Sina, Moana's mother, Tui's wife, and Chieftess of Motunui
  - Scherzinger also reprised her role in the film's Hawaiian-language dub
- Alan Tudyk as Heihei, Moana's pet rooster
  - Tudyk also voices Villager No. 3, an old man who suggests cooking Heihei
- Oscar Kightley as a fisherman
- Troy Polamalu as Villager No. 1
- Puanani Cravalho (Auli'i Cravalho's mother) as Villager No. 2

== Production ==
=== Development ===
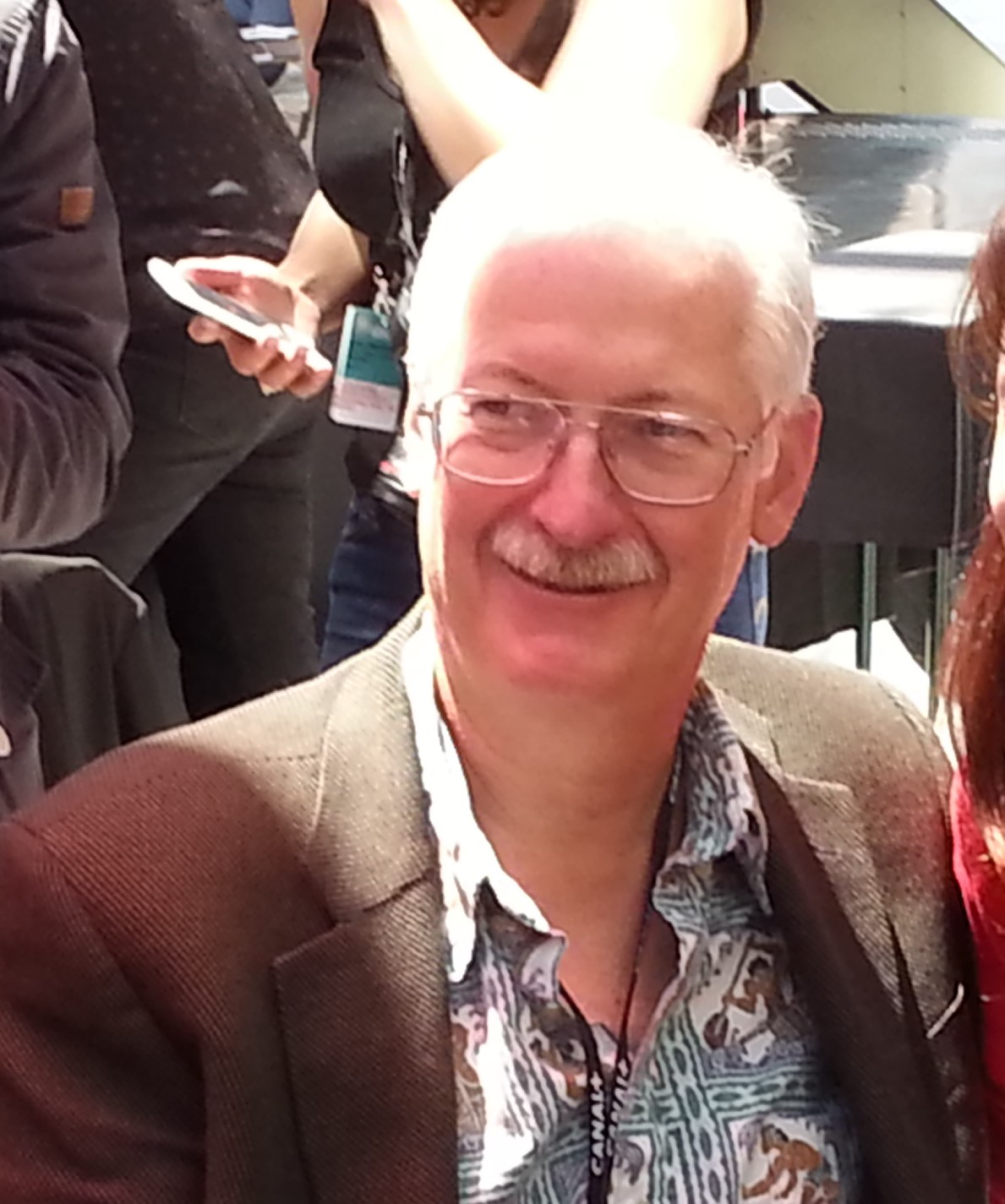
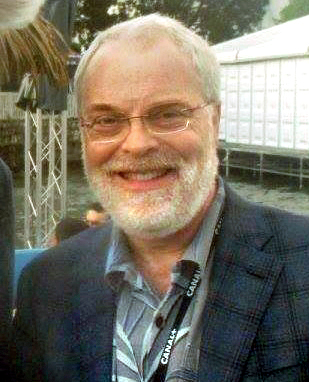
Directors John Musker and Ron Clements presented footage from the film at the 2016 Annecy International Animated Film Festival.

After directing The Princess and the Frog (2009), Clements and Musker started working on an adaptation of Terry Pratchett's Mort, but problems with acquiring the necessary film rights prevented them from continuing with that project. To avoid a recurrence of that issue, they pitched three original ideas. The genesis of one of those ideas (the one that was ultimately green-lit) occurred in 2011, when Musker began reading up on Polynesian mythology, and learned of the heroic exploits of the demigod Māui. Intrigued with the rich culture of Polynesia, he felt it would be a suitable subject for an animated film. Shortly thereafter, Musker and Clements wrote a treatment and pitched it to John Lasseter, who recommended that both of them should go on research trips. Accordingly, in 2012, Clements and Musker went on research trips to Fiji, Samoa, and Tahiti to meet the people of the South Pacific Ocean and learn about their culture. At first, they had planned to make the film entirely about Maui, but their initial research trips inspired Clements to pitch a new idea focused on the young daughter of a chief.

Clements and Musker were fascinated to learn during their research that the people of Polynesia abruptly stopped making long-distance voyages about three thousand years ago. Polynesian navigational traditions had long predated those of European explorers, beginning around 300 CE. Native people of the Pacific possessed knowledge of the world and their place in it prior to the incursion of foreigners. For example, Kānaka Maoli (Native Hawaiians) were well aware of the existence of far away islands, had names for these places, and were interested in exploring them to benefit their societies. This voyaging heritage was made possible by a geographical knowledge system based on individual perspective rather than the European cardinal direction system. The reasons for the halt of this voyaging tradition remain unknown, but scholars have offered climate change and resulting shifts in ocean currents and wind patterns as one possible explanation. Native peoples of the Pacific resumed voyaging again a thousand years later. Clements and Musker set the film at that point in time, about two thousand years ago, on a fictional island in the central Pacific Ocean, which drew inspiration from elements of the real-life island nations of Fiji, Samoa, and Tonga.

Over the five years it took to develop and produce the film, Clements and Musker recruited experts from across the South Pacific to form an Oceanic Story Trust, who consulted on the film's cultural accuracy and sensitivity as the story evolved through nine versions. The Trust responded negatively, for example, to a depiction of Maui as bald, and to a proposed scene in which Moana threw a tantrum by throwing coconuts. In response, Maui was reworked with long hair and the coconut scene was scrapped.

During the 2015 D23 Expo's panel for Disney's slate of upcoming animated films, Moana's last name was given as "Waialiki", but that name was not retained in the final film.

=== Writing ===
The first draft of the screenplay was written by Taika Waititi. Waititi left his position with Disney and went home to New Zealand in 2012 to focus on his newborn first child and What We Do in the Shadows. Years later, Waititi joked that all that was left of his original draft was "EXT: OCEAN – DAY". The first draft focused on Moana as the sole daughter in a family with "five or six brothers", in which gender played into the story. However, the brothers and gender-based theme were deleted from the story, as the directors thought Moana's journey should be about finding herself. A subsequent draft presented Moana's father as the one who wanted to resume navigation, but it was rewritten to have him oppose navigation so he would not overshadow Moana. Instead, Pamela Ribon came up with the idea of a grandmother character for the film, who would serve as a mentor linking Moana to ancient traditions. Another version focused on Moana rescuing her father, who had been lost at sea. The film's story changed drastically during the development phase (which happens with most Disney films), and that idea ultimately survived only as a subtle element of the father's backstory.

Te Kā was referred to in early drafts of the film as Te Pō, a reference to the Māori goddess Hine-nui-te-pō, who was originally the life-giving goddess Hine-tītama, but became the goddess of death upon discovering that her husband, the god Tāne, was also her father. Māui was killed in his failed attempt to bring immortality to humans.

Aaron and Jordan Kandell joined the project during a critical period to help deepen the emotional story architecture of the film. They are credited with developing the core relationship between Moana and Maui, the prologue, the Cave of the Wayfinders, the Kakamora, and the collector crab Tamatoa (played by Jemaine Clement). Jared Bush received sole credit as the writer of the final version of the screenplay.

Several major story problems were identified in 2015 after the film had already transitioned from development into production, but computer-generated films tend to have much shorter production schedules and much larger animation teams (in this case, about 90 animators) than traditionally animated films. Since Clements and Musker were already working 12-hour days (and Saturdays) directing such a large team of animators, Don Hall and Chris Williams (who had just finished directing Big Hero 6) came on board as co-directors to help fix the film's story issues. The scene in which Maui and Moana encounter the Kakamora is an intentional homage to Mad Max: Fury Road.

=== Casting ===
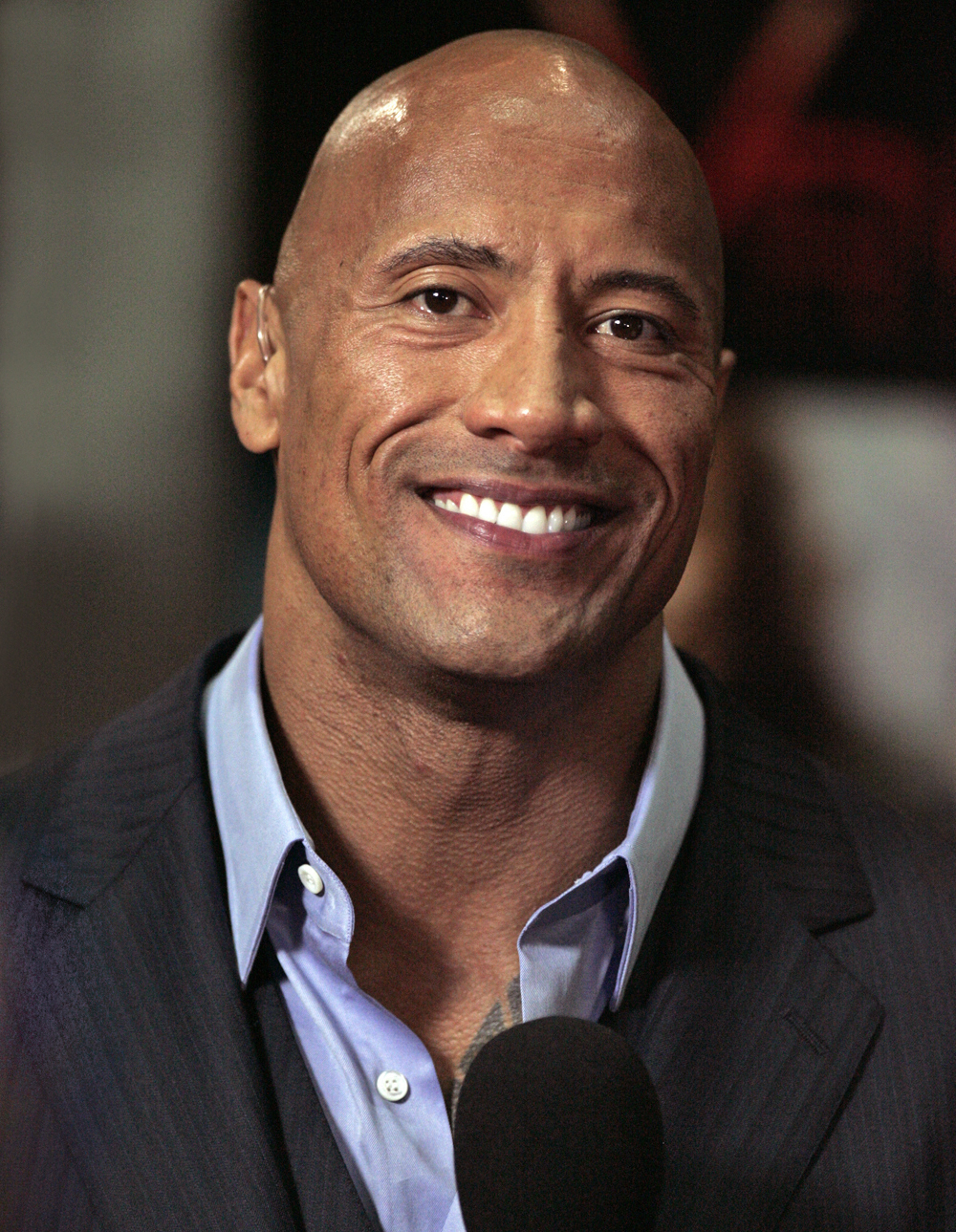
Dwayne Johnson played the co-starring role of Maui in Moana.

After the filmmakers sat through auditions of hundreds of candidates from across the Pacific, 14-year-old high school freshman Auliʻi Cravalho was cast as the lead character Moana. At that point in time, the design of Moana's face and personality was already complete, and Cravalho's obvious physical resemblance to her character was simply a coincidence. During animation production, Disney animators were able to integrate some of Cravalho's mannerisms into Moana's behavior as depicted onscreen.

The majority of the film's cast members are of Polynesian descent: Auliʻi Cravalho (Moana) and Nicole Scherzinger (Sina, Moana's mother) were born in Hawaii and are of Native Hawaiian heritage; Dwayne Johnson (Maui), Oscar Kightley (Fisherman), and Troy Polamalu (Villager No. 1) are of Samoan heritage; and New Zealand-born Rachel House (Tala, Moana's grandmother), Temuera Morrison (Tui, Moana's father), and Jemaine Clement (Tamatoa) are of Māori heritage.

=== Animation ===
Moana is Clements and Musker's first fully computer-animated film. One of the reasons for using computer animation was that the environment, including the ocean, benefited much more from the use of CGI as opposed to traditional animation. The filmmakers have also suggested that three-dimensional computer animation is well-suited to the "beautiful sculpturing" of the faces of the people of the South Pacific. Eric Goldberg worked on the hand-drawn animation used to depict Maui's sentient tattoos. During early development, the filmmakers considered the possibility of making the film with hand-drawn traditional animation, but only a few early animation tests were made in that style. In the final cut, only Maui's tattoos are hand-drawn. The animation crew consulted with the Polynesian Voyaging Society over references of material culture like ship parts so their textures would be rendered realistically in the final animation.

Moana was produced in makeshift quarters in a giant warehouse in North Hollywood (together with Zootopia), while Disney Animation's headquarters building in Burbank was being renovated. Musker observed that Moana was similar in that respect to The Little Mermaid, which was produced in a warehouse in Glendale. Production wrapped on October 20, 2016.

=== Music and soundtrack ===
The film's soundtrack was released by Walt Disney Records on November 18, 2016. The songs were written by Opetaia Foa'i; Mark Mancina, in his third collaboration with Walt Disney Animation Studios after Tarzan and Brother Bear; and Lin-Manuel Miranda, while the score was written by Mancina. The lyrics are in English, Samoan, and the Tokelauan language. The soundtrack peaked at number two on the Billboard 200. A song from the soundtrack, "How Far I'll Go" with words/lyrics by Lin-Manuel Miranda, was nominated for Best Original Song at the 89th Academy Awards.

The song "How Far I'll Go" earned several high-profile nominations, including the Academy Award for Best Original Song (89th Oscars) and the Golden Globe Award for Best Original Song (74th Golden Globes). It also secured the Grammy Award for Best Song Written for Visual Media at the 60th Annual Grammy Awards.

=== Localization ===
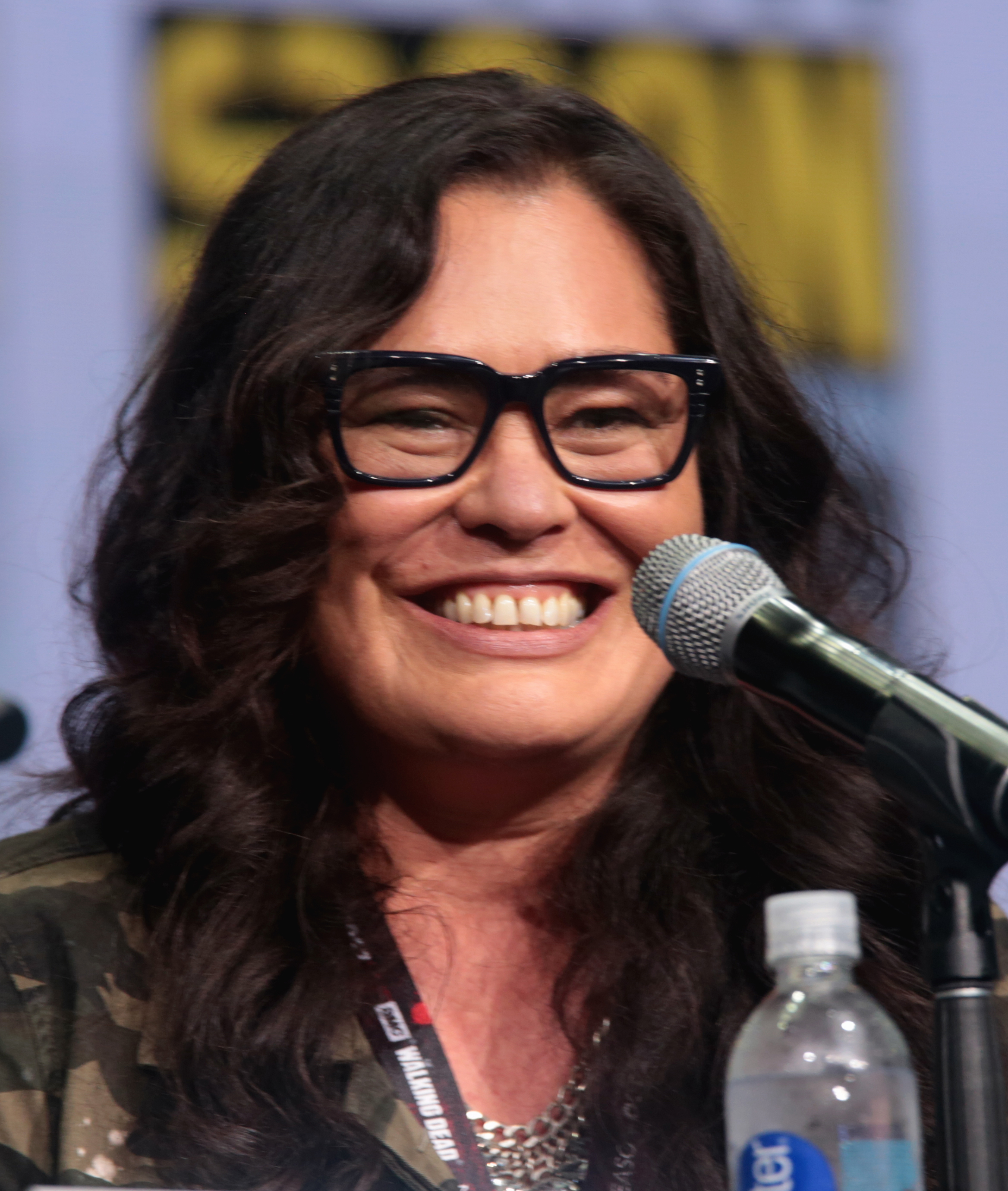
Rachel House reprised her role in the Māori version of Moana, and took over the direction of the dubbing.

In many European countries, the name of the titular character, Moana, was changed to Vaiana due to a trademark conflict. The film was released in those countries to bear the alternative name in the title. In Italy, the film was released with the title Oceania; media outlets speculated that the name change was to avoid confusion with Italian pornographic actress Moana Pozzi, and Disney Italy's head of theatrical marketing, Davide Romani, acknowledged they were "thinking about the issue" at a meeting of Italian exhibitors in 2015.

Following the success brought by international productions of Disney's Frozen, which led to the release of a complete set album which included all the official versions of "Let It Go" released at the time, Disney decided to produce a special Tahitian dubbing for the film. On October 25, 2016, at a press conference in Papeete, it was announced that the film will be the first motion picture to be fully dubbed in the Tahitian language. This marks the second time Disney has released a special dubbing dedicated to the culture which inspired the film: the first case was The Lion King (1994), for which the directors travelled to South Africa to cast voice actors for a Zulu-dubbed version. The Tahitian dubbing was made available in schools and institutions, but never for the public to purchase.

In June 2017, a Māori-language dubbing of the film produced by Matewa Media was announced, premiering in Auckland on September 11, with 30 theatres screening it for free as part of Māori Language Week. Rachel House, Jemaine Clement, Temuera Morrison, and Oscar Kightley reprised their respective roles in this version, directed by Rachel House herself. In contrast to the Tahitian dubbing, the Māori version was made available for purchase in Australia and New Zealand, and the soundtrack was uploaded on Disney's official Vevo channel.

In November 2017, a Hawaiian-language (ʻŌlelo Hawaiʻi) dubbing was announced to be under way, with Auliʻi Cravalho reprising her role as Moana and Nicole Scherzinger reprising the role of Sina. The film premiered on June 10, 2018, and like the Tahitian dubbing, was later distributed for free to schools in Hawaii. It was never released for sale in home media form.

Highlighted versions were released later than 2016

"Moana" worldwide
Language	Title	Translation
Arabic	موانا (Muwānā)	
Bengali	মোয়ানা (Mōẏānā)	
Bulgarian	Смелата Ваяна (Smelata Vayana)	Brave Vaiana
Cantonese	魔海奇緣 (Mo^{1}hoi^{2}kei^{4}jyun^{4})	Romance of the magic ocean
Catalan	Vaiana	
Croatian	Vaiana: Potraga za mitskim otokom	Vaiana: quest for the mythical island
Czech	Odvážná Vaiana: Legenda o konci světa	Brave Vaiana: The legend of the end of the world
Danish	Vaiana	
Dutch	Vaiana	
English (continental Europe)	Vaiana	
English	Moana	
Estonian	Vaiana	
Finnish	Vaiana	
Flemish	Vaiana	
French (Canada)	Moana	
French (Europe)	Vaiana, la Légende du bout du monde	Vaiana, the legend from the end of the world
German	Vaiana – Das Paradies hat einen Haken	Vaiana – Paradise has a catch
Greek	Βαϊάνα (Vaïána)	
Hawaiian	Moana	
Hebrew	מואנה (Moana)	
Hindi	मोआना (Moaana)	
Hungarian	Vaiana	
Icelandic	Vaiana	
Indonesian	Moana	
Italian	Oceania	
Japanese	モアナと伝説の海 (Moana to densetsu no umi)	Moana and The Legendary Sea
Kazakh	Моана (Moana)	
Korean	모아나 (Moana)	
Latvian	Vaiana	
Lithuanian	Vajana	
Malay	Moana	
Mandarin Chinese (China)	海洋奇缘; Hǎiyáng qí yuán	The romance of the ocean
Mandarin Chinese (Taiwan)	海洋奇緣; Hǎiyáng qí yuán	The romance of the ocean
Māori	Moana	
Norwegian	Vaiana	
Polish	Vaiana: Skarb oceanu	Vaiana: Treasure of the ocean
Portuguese (Brazil)	Moana: Um mar de aventuras	Moana: A Sea of Adventures
Portuguese (Europe)	Vaiana	
Romanian	Vaiana	
Russian	Моана (Moana)	
Serbian	Вајана (Vajana)	
Slovak	Vaiana	
Slovene	Vaiana	
Spanish (Europe)	Vaiana	
Spanish (Latin America)	Moana: Un mar de aventuras	Moana: A Sea of Adventures
Swedish	Vaiana	
Tamil	மோனா (Mōṉā)	
Tahitian	Moana	
Thai	ผจญภัยตำนานหมู่เกาะทะเลใต้ (Pà-jon pai dtam-naan mòo gòr tá-lay dtâi)	Adventure on the islands of the legendary southern sea
Turkish	Moana	
Ukrainian	Ваяна (Vaiana)	
Vietnamese	Hành trình của Moana	Moana's journey

== Release ==
On October 20, 2014, Walt Disney Pictures announced that it would be releasing the film in late 2016, and hinted that it might be the November 23, 2016, release window previously announced by the studio in March 2014 for a then-untitled film. In November 2014, Disney confirmed that it would be releasing the film on November 23, 2016. The film is accompanied by the short film Inner Workings. The film's world premiere was held on the grand opening of the AFI Fest Celebration at the El Capitan Theatre in Los Angeles on November 14, 2016.

On January 27, 2017, a sing-along version of Moana was released in more than 2,000 theaters in the United States, featuring on-screen lyrics.

As part of Disney's 100th anniversary, Moana was re-released between October 13 to 26, 2023 in the United States, on October 14 in Helios theaters across Poland, and between October 26 to November 1 in Latin America opposite Coco. This re-release included the short Once Upon a Studio, which was shown before the film.

=== Marketing ===
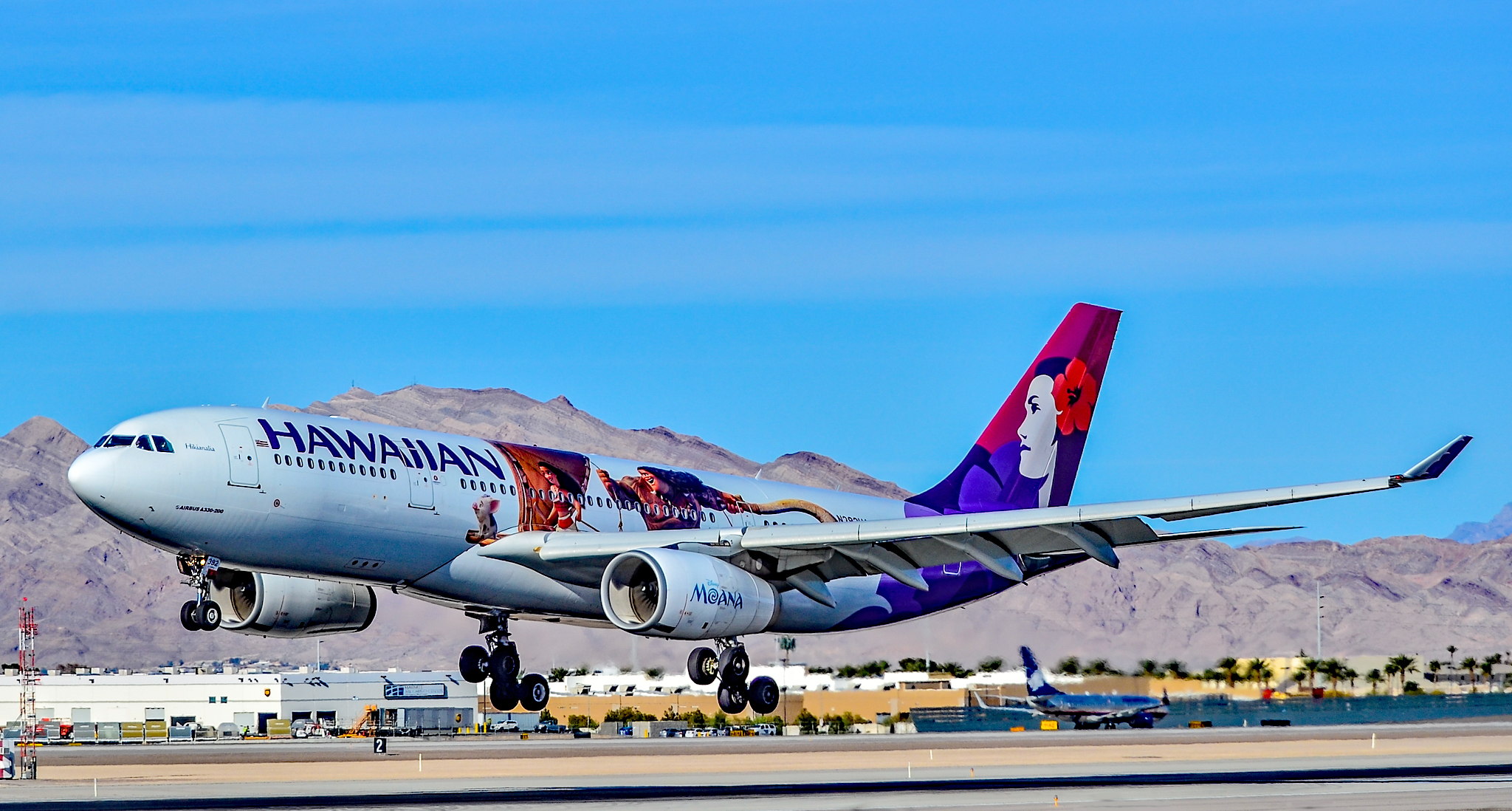
Hawaiian Airlines Moana logojet landing at McCarran International Airport in Las Vegas in March 2017

Prior to the film's first trailer, a Moana DVD appears in the 2016 film Zootopia, alongside Frozen 2 and the unproduced film Gigantic. On October 15, 2016, Hawaiian Airlines unveiled their Moana-themed livery for three of their Airbus A330-200 fleet. Disney initiating a partnership with Hawaiian Airlines to promote the film has been perceived as having the motive of fetishizing Polynesian island nations as exotic vacation spots, the people and culture of which exist only to entertain foreign audiences, as well as Auliʻi Cravalho speaking with The New York Times in an interview sharing travel tips for visitors to Hawaii. Critiques of these promotional tactics focus on how adverse effects of tourism have devastated native communities in the Pacific, resulting in environmental degradation and poverty.

A Maui "skin suit" costume made to tie in with the film was pulled by Disney from its online store following complaints about it being culturally insensitive and for appearing to promote brownface.

There are currently meet-and-greets with Moana at Disneyland, Walt Disney World, Disneyland Paris, and at Aulani, a Disney Resort and Spa. At the parks, she is located in Adventureland and is occasionally joined by Maui.

At Hong Kong Disneyland, there is a stage show called Moana's Village Festival, which opened in 2018.

=== Home media ===
Moana was released by Walt Disney Studios Home Entertainment on Blu-ray (2D and 3D) and DVD in the United States on March 7, 2017, with a digital release on February 21, 2017. The releases include the short film Inner Workings. The Blu-ray release also introduces a short film featuring Maui and Moana titled Gone Fishing. Moana was also released on the streaming service Disney+ on its launch date November 12, 2019. A sing-along version of the film was released on Disney+ July 22, 2022.

In 2017, Moana sold 4.4 million units and generated $116.3 million in revenue from home video sales, making it the best-selling film of the year. In 2018, the film sold 357,378 units, earning $5,232,197 in home video revenue. The following year, the film sold 467,213 units and generated $7,803,605 in revenue. In 2020, Moana sold 252,055 units, earning $4,055,589 in home video revenue.

Nielsen Media Research, which records streaming viewership on some U.S. television screens, reported that Moana was streamed for 10.507 billion minutes in 2020, ranking as the second most-streamed film of the year. In 2021, it was streamed for 8.896 billion minutes, again placing second among films for the year. The following year, Moana was streamed for 8.629 billion minutes, ranking fourth in annual streaming rankings. In 2023, the film was streamed for 11.6 billion minutes, making it the most-streamed film of the year. Moana retained the top position in 2024 with 13.03 billion minutes streamed. Between January and June 2025, it accumulated 3.846 billion minutes of viewing time, ranking as the fourth most-streamed film in that period. In December 2025, Disney announced that the film was among the programs to surpass one billion hours streamed on Disney+ in 2025. That same month, Nielsen subsequently that Moana had accumulated 37.7 billion minutes of watch time between 2020 and 2025, ranking first among the most-streamed films during that period. For 2025, the film garnered 5.81 billion minutes of watch time, ranking as the fourth most-streamed children's film and the seventh most-streamed film overall for the year.

== Reception ==
=== Box office ===
Moana grossed $248.7 million in the U.S. and Canada, and $438.4 million in other countries, for a worldwide total of $687.2 million. On January 22 and March 16, 2017, respectively, the film reached the $500 million and $600 million marks, becoming the fourth consecutive Walt Disney Animation Studios film to reach both milestones after Frozen (2013), Big Hero 6 (2014), and Zootopia (2016). Although Disney had not disclosed the film's production budget, most of its animated films cost around $150 million. Deadline Hollywood calculated the net profit of the film to be $121.3 million, when factoring together all expenses and revenues for the film, making it the 12th-most profitable release of 2016.

==== North America ====
In the United States, Moana was released during the Thanksgiving weekend. The film played in 3,875 theaters of which a majority of them (80%) screened it in 3D. It also played in 50 premium large-format screens and more than 400 D-Box screens. It was projected to take in around $50 million in three days, with $75–85 million in five days (some estimates going as high as $90 million). Deadline.com said the numbers were good for the original Disney film and marked a great rebound for the company in the wake of Pixar's The Good Dinosaur the previous year, which had made $55 million over five days off a production budget of $175–200 million.

Moana made $2.6 million from Tuesday paid previews which began at 7 pm, the highest ever for a Walt Disney Animation Studios film and for a non-Pixar Disney animated film. On its opening day, it made $15.5 million, a new record for a Walt Disney Animation Studios film opening on Wednesday (breaking Frozen's record) and the biggest opening day ever for a film released on pre-Thanksgiving Day. On Thanksgiving Day, it earned $9.9 million, a decrease of 36% from its previous day. On Black Friday—the highest-grossing day of the Thanksgiving stretch—it made $21.8 million, a 127% increase from the day before. Through Sunday, the film posted a three-day opening weekend worth $56.6 million over its Friday-to-Sunday debut and $82.1 million from Wednesday to Sunday, the third biggest three-day Thanksgiving opening (behind Frozen and Toy Story 2) and the second-biggest five-day Thanksgiving opening (behind Frozen), dethroning Fantastic Beasts and Where to Find Them off the top spot. Among all films that did not necessarily open in this weekend but may have played, Moana ranks sixth among three-day weekends and fifth among five-day weekends.

The film's opening was considered to be another animated success for the studio after Zootopia and Pixar's Finding Dory posted huge openings, respectively, the same year in March and June.

In its second weekend, the film dropped by about 50% for a total of $28.3 million, a smaller drop than Toy Story 2, Frozen, Tangled, and The Good Dinosaur. The film managed to top the box office for its third weekend, despite competition from newcomers and holdovers, earning $18.5 million while falling by 34%. It became the sixth film of 2016 to top the box office three times, following Deadpool, Zootopia, The Jungle Book, Finding Dory, and Suicide Squad. The film was overtaken by Disney's own Rogue One: A Star Wars Story in its fourth weekend, despite only a marginal decline.

It fell to number six in its fifth weekend, due to competition from four new releases—Sing, Passengers, Why Him?, and Assassin's Creed—despite a small drop again; it grossed $2.9 million on Christmas Day. On the holiday week of December 23–29, the film finished at number four with a gross of $26 million, which was 14% up from the previous week, despite losing over 300 theaters. It finished at number four in its sixth weekend, going up 42% and 97%, respectively, during the three-day and four-day weekends; it grossed $3.6 million on New Year's Day.

It fell outside the top ten in its eighth weekend (which included Martin Luther King Jr. Day), dropping 33% and 4%, respectively, during the three-day and four-day weekends.

==== Outside North America ====
Internationally, the film earned $17.2 million in its first weekend from 12 markets, the bulk of which came from China. In its second weekend, the film expanded to a total of 30 markets, adding an additional $33.7 million.

In China, the film had a November 25 opening day with $1.9 million from 38,000 screenings. However, it enjoyed a big weekend bump on Saturday—even though its screens dipped—and Sunday. In total, it scored an opening weekend of $12.3 million, the second best for a Disney animated title, behind only Zootopia. It was No. 2 behind Fantastic Beasts and Where to Find Them. Strong social media numbers showed among the highest the studio has seen there, similar to how Zootopia started off slow and later became a blockbuster phenomenon. The film slipped 55% in its second weekend, earning $5.8 million, and $21.8 in total in China. It would eventually earn a total of $32.7 million in China.

It had similar successful number-one debuts in France, Russia, Mexico and Spain. The film also saw success in Belgium, the Netherlands and French-speaking Switzerland. In the United Kingdom and Ireland, the film faced competition from Fantastic Beasts—which was playing in its third weekend—and as a result, it posted a low opening of only £2.2 million ($2.8 million).

The biggest earning markets to date have been Japan ($45.9 million), followed by France ($35.5 million), China ($32.8 million), the UK ($25.3 million), Brazil ($22.9 million), Australia ($19 million), Germany ($17 million), Italy ($15.9 million), and South Korea ($15.5 million).

=== Critical response ===
On review aggregator website Rotten Tomatoes, Moana holds an approval rating of 95% based on 287 reviews and an average rating of 7.9/10. The website's critical consensus reads "With a title character as three-dimensional as its lush animation and a story that adds fresh depth to Disney's time-tested formula, Moana is truly a family-friendly adventure for the ages." Subsequently, the film is also listed as number 20 on the website's "100 Best Computer-Animated Movies" list. On Metacritic, the film holds a weighted average score of 81 out of 100, based on 44 critics, indicating "universal acclaim". Audiences polled by CinemaScore gave the film an average grade of "A" on an A+ to F scale, while PostTrak reported filmgoers gave an 89% overall positive score and a 79% "definite recommend".

Joe Morgenstern of The Wall Street Journal proclaimed that "Moana is beautiful in more ways than I can tell, thanks to the brilliance of more animators than I could count." Animator Eric Goldberg received praise from critics and audiences for his hand-drawn animation of Maui's tattoos, which they claimed "stole the show" from the actual CGI-animated motion picture. Wai Chee Dimock, writing in the Los Angeles Review of Books, compared the ocean in Moana to the one in "The Water Baby", a short story by Jack London, saying that both are animated: one, by the tension between digital and analog animation, and the other, by the tension between an encroaching future and a past in retreat still capable of pushing back.

Christy Lemire of RogerEbert.com gave the film three-and-a-half out of four stars, stating "...its dazzling visuals, catchy tunes, enjoyable performances, clever running gags and overall sense of fun. It's all there, and—except for a few scary moments—it'll delight viewers of all ages." Peter Debruge of Variety praised the film, calling it "a return to the heights of the Disney Renaissance".

Critics also lauded Moana for centering on a strong female protagonist whose narrative is not confined to finding a Prince Charming, a contrast to princess characters of past Disney films. Brent Lang of Variety wrote, "Whereas earlier Disney heroines waited around for their prince to come and save the day, Moana takes it upon herself to embark on a perilous oceanic voyage in order to lift her island home from a curse. It's the kind of adventuring that would have been left for the guys in Disney films of yore... Her journey is about finding herself, not landing a husband".

A 2026 article published in The Guardian explored the similarities between the film to the 1926 documentary "Moana". A silent film by Robert J. Flahrety set in Samoa. According to the article film historian Bruce Posner and academic Dionne Fonoti claim the earlier documentary may have influenced the cultural and philosophic theme of the Disney film.

== Other media ==
Due to the success of the film, Moana was officially added to the Disney Princess franchise and was the 12th addition to the lineup. Moana was the most-streamed film in the United States over a five-year period from 2020 to 2024, being watched for a total of more than 1 billion hours, leading the Wall Street Journal to describe it as "the No.1 movie in streaming history."

=== Theme park attraction ===
On October 16, 2023, Walt Disney World Resort announced that a new water walk-through attraction, the Journey of Water Pavilion, was opened in World Nature section of the park at EPCOT, as part of The Walt Disney Company's 100th anniversary celebration, since the opening date was indefinitely delayed due to the COVID-19 pandemic.

== Expanded franchise ==
=== Sequels ===
A sequel, Moana 2, directed by Jason Hand, Dana Ledoux Miller & David Derrick Jr., was released in theaters on November 27, 2024. A 16-second first look at the film was released in February 2024. The project was originally announced in December 2020 as a television series for Disney+ before being redeveloped into a feature film.

On July 2, 2026, Dwayne Johnson confirmed that a second sequel is in the works. He also confirmed that Jared Bush and Dana Ledoux Miller would return to write the script.

=== Live-action adaptation ===
In April 2023, The Hollywood Reporter reported that Walt Disney Pictures was developing a live-action adaptation of Moana to be produced by Johnson, Dany Garcia, and Hiram Garcia, under their production company Seven Bucks Productions, and Beau Flynn of Flynn Pictures Co., executive produced by Auliʻi Cravalho and Scott Sheldon, and written by Jared Bush, with Johnson set to reprise his role as Maui. Johnson remarked "This story is my culture, and this story is emblematic of our people's grace and warrior strength. I wear this culture proudly on my skin and in my soul, and this once-in-a-lifetime opportunity to reunite with Maui, inspired by the mana and spirit of my late grandfather, High Chief Peter Maivia, is one that runs very deep for me... There is no better world for us to honor the story of our people, our passion and our purpose than through the realm of music and dance, which is at the core of who we are as Polynesian people." Sean Bailey, Disney Live Action's president of production, acknowledged that, although only seven years had passed since the animated film was released, the celebration of Disney's 100th anniversary contributed to the decision to remake the film so soon.

Thomas Kail is set to direct the film, while Cravalho would not reprise her role as Moana. The film was originally scheduled for theatrical release on June 27, 2025, in the United States, but was delayed to July 10, 2026, due to the release of Moana 2.

On June 12, 2024, it was announced that newcomer Catherine Laga'aia was cast as the titular character. Additional casting includes John Tui as Chief Tui, Frankie Adams as Sina, and Rena Owen as Gramma Tala.

== See also ==
- Austronesian peoples
- House of Moana
- Māui (Hawaiian mythology)
- Whale Rider - New Zealand film with potential cultural influences on Moana, featuring Rachel House who played Tala in Moana.
