= Polynesia =

Subregion of Oceania

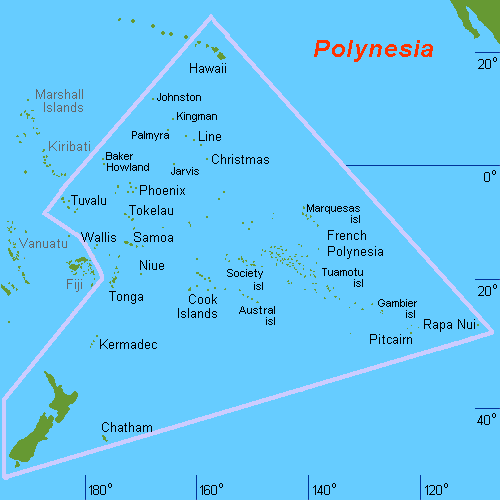
- Polynesia is generally defined as the islands within the Polynesian Triangle.

Population (2021)
  - Total: ▲7,658,846
- Demonym: Polynesians
- Countries: 6: Cook Islands (in free association with New Zealand); New Zealand; Niue (in free association with New Zealand); Samoa; Tonga; Tuvalu
- Dependencies: External: American Samoa (United States); French Polynesia (France); Pitcairn Islands (United Kingdom); Tokelau (New Zealand); Wallis and Futuna (France); Internal: Easter Island (Chile); Hawaii (United States); Rotuma (Fiji)

Polynesia (Note: Tongan: Polinisia; Māori: Poronihia; Hawaiian: Polenekia; Fijian: Polinisia; Samoan: Polenisia; Cook Islands Māori: Porinetia; Tahitian: Pōrīnetia; Tuvaluan: Polenisia; Tokelauan: Polenihia; French: Polynésie; Spanish: Polinesia. From Ancient Greek: πολύς (polýs) "many" and νῆσος (nêsos) "island".) (UK: /ˌpɒlɪˈniːziə/ POL-in-EE-zee-ə, US: /-ˈniːʒə/ -EE-zhə) is a subregion of Oceania, made up of more than 1,000 islands scattered over the central and southern Pacific Ocean. The indigenous people who inhabit the islands of Polynesia are called Polynesians. They have many things in common, including linguistic relations, cultural practices, and traditional beliefs.

The term Polynésie was first used in 1756 by the French writer Charles de Brosses, who originally applied it to all the islands of the Pacific. In 1831, Jules Dumont d'Urville proposed a narrower definition during a lecture at the Société de Géographie of Paris. By tradition, the islands located in the southern Pacific have also often been called the South Sea Islands, and their inhabitants have been called South Sea Islanders. The Hawaiian Islands have often been considered to be part of the South Sea Islands because of their relative proximity to the southern Pacific islands, even though they are in fact located in the North Pacific. Another term in use, which avoids this inconsistency, is "the Polynesian Triangle" (from the shape created by the layout of the islands in the Pacific Ocean). This term makes clear that the grouping includes the Hawaiian Islands, which are located at the northern vertex of the referenced "triangle".

Polynesia is one of three major cultural areas of the Pacific Ocean islands, along with Melanesia and Micronesia.

Subregions (Melanesia, Micronesia, Polynesia, and Australasia), as well as sovereign and dependent islands of Oceania

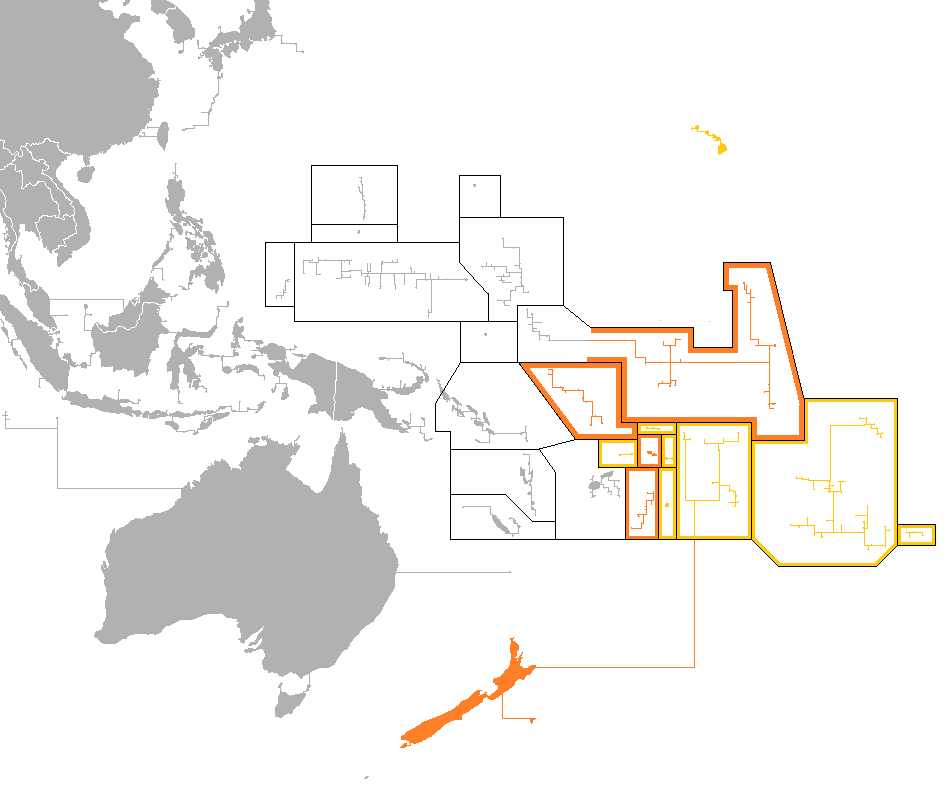
Outline of sovereign (dark orange) and dependent islands (bright orange)

== Geography ==
=== Geology ===
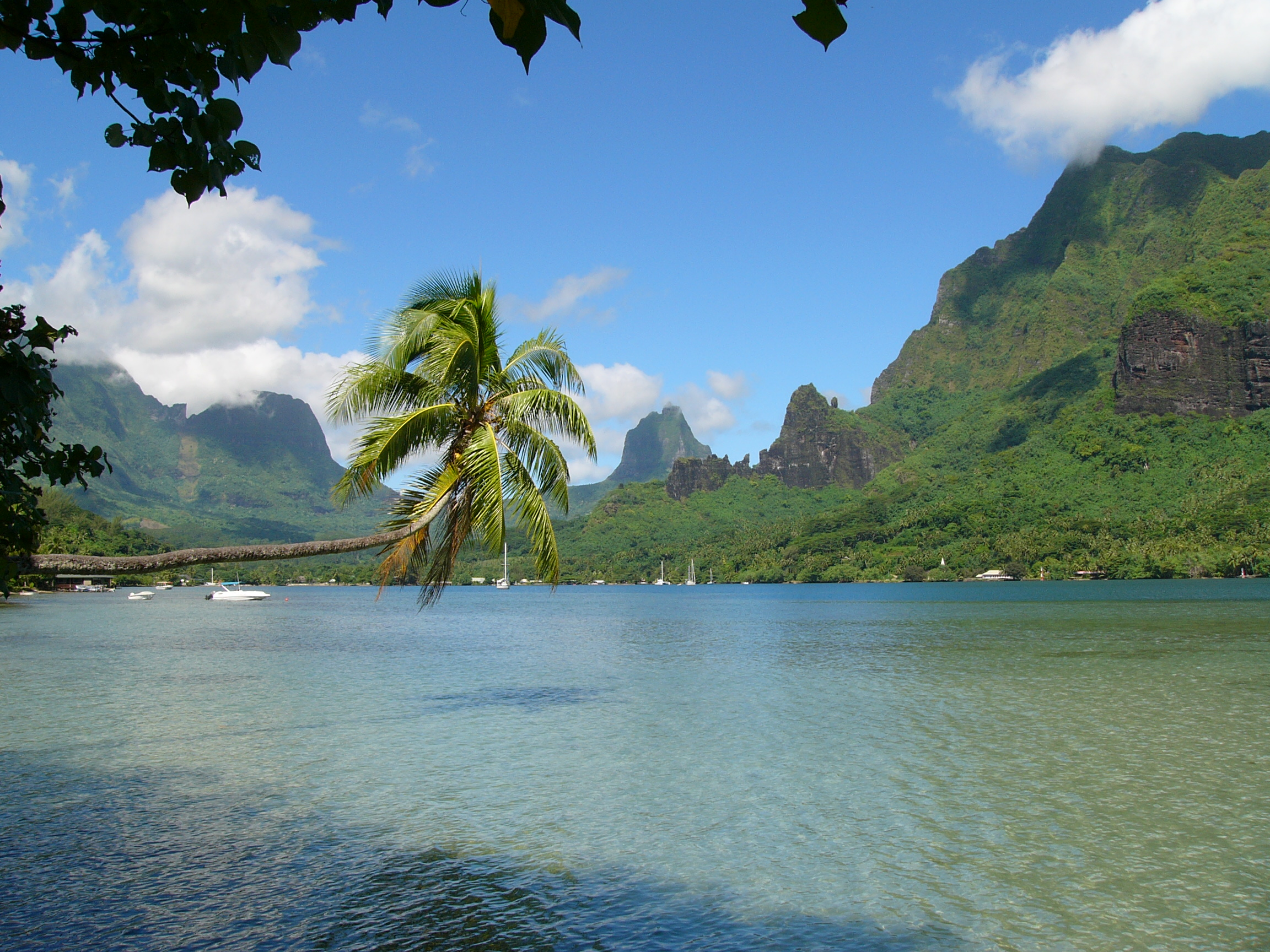
Cook's Bay on Moorea, French Polynesia

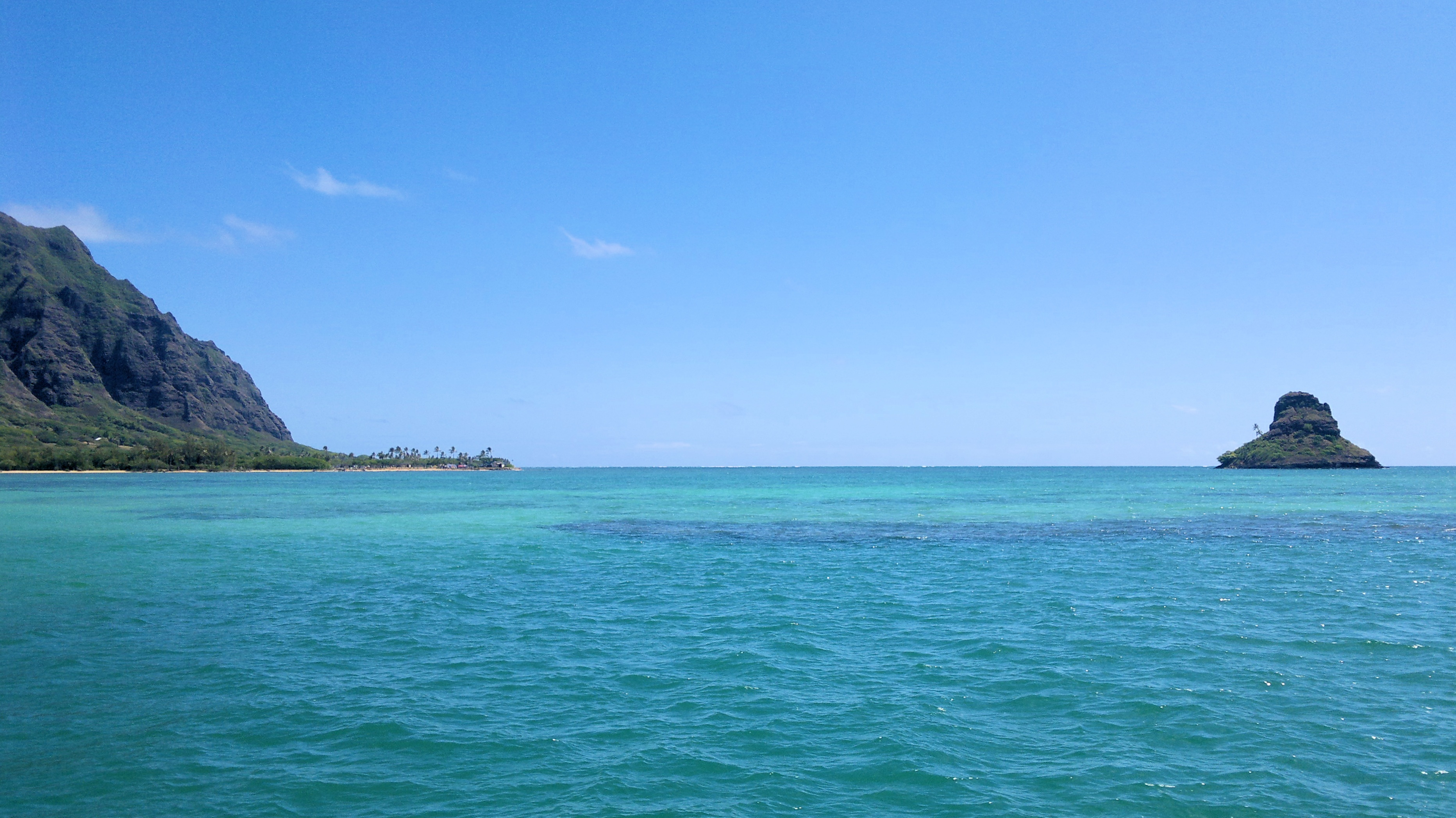
Mokoliʻi Isle near Oahu, Hawaii

Polynesia is characterized by a small amount of land spread over a very large portion of the mid- and southern Pacific Ocean. It consists of approximately 300,000 to 310,000 square kilometres (117,000 to 118,000 sq mi) of land, of which more than 270,000 km^{2} (103,000 sq mi) are within New Zealand. The Hawaiian archipelago consists of about half the remainder.

Most Polynesian islands and archipelagos, including the Hawaiian Islands and Samoa, are composed of volcanic islands built by hotspots (volcanoes). The other land masses in Polynesia—New Zealand, Norfolk Island, and Ouvéa, the Polynesian outlier near New Caledonia—are the unsubmerged portions of the largely sunken continent of Zealandia.

Zealandia is believed to have mostly sunk below sea level 23 million years ago, and recently partially resurfaced due to a change in the movements of the Pacific Plate in relation to the Indo-Australian Plate. The Pacific plate had previously been subducted under the Australian Plate. When that changed, it had the effect of uplifting the portion of the continent that is modern-day New Zealand.

The convergent plate boundary that runs northwards from New Zealand's North Island is called the Kermadec-Tonga subduction zone. This subduction zone is associated with the volcanism that gave rise to the Kermadec and Tongan islands.

There is a transform fault that currently traverses New Zealand's South Island, known as the Alpine Fault.

Zealandia's continental shelf has a total area of approximately 3,600,000 km^{2} (1,400,000 sq mi).

The oldest rocks in Polynesia are found in New Zealand and are believed to be about 510 million years old. The oldest Polynesian rocks outside Zealandia are to be found in the Hawaiian Emperor Seamount Chain and are 80 million years old.

=== Geographical area ===
Polynesia is generally defined as the islands within the Polynesian Triangle, although some islands inhabited by Polynesians are situated outside that area. Geographically, the Polynesian Triangle is drawn by connecting the points of Hawaii, New Zealand, and Easter Island. The other main island groups located within the Polynesian Triangle are Samoa, Tonga, the Cook Islands, Tuvalu, Tokelau, Niue, Wallis and Futuna, and French Polynesia.

Also, small Polynesian settlements are in Papua New Guinea, the Solomon Islands, the Caroline Islands, and Vanuatu. An island group with strong Polynesian cultural traits outside of this great triangle is Rotuma, situated north of Fiji. The people of Rotuma have many common Polynesian traits, but speak a non-Polynesian language. Some of the Lau Islands to the southeast of Fiji have strong historic and cultural links with Tonga. However, in essence, Polynesia remains a cultural term referring to one of the three parts of Oceania (the others being Melanesia and Micronesia).

=== Island groups ===
The following islands and island groups are either nations or overseas territories of former colonial powers. The residents are native Polynesians or contain archaeological evidence indicating Polynesian settlement in the past. (Note: Islands that were uninhabited at contact but which have archaeological evidence of Polynesian settlement include Norfolk Island, Pitcairn, New Zealand's Kermadec Islands and some small islands near Hawaii.) Some islands of Polynesian origin are outside the general triangle that geographically defines the region.

==== Polynesian area ====
Country / Territory	Notes
American Samoa	Unincorporated and unorganized territory of the United States; self-governing under the supervision of the Office of Insular Affairs
Cook Islands	State in free association with New Zealand
Easter Island	Province and special territory of Chile
French Polynesia	Overseas country of France
Hawaii	U.S. state
New Zealand	Sovereign state
Niue	State in free association with New Zealand
Norfolk Island	External territory of Australia
Pitcairn Islands	British Overseas Territory
Rotuma	Fijian dependency
Samoa	Sovereign state
Tokelau	Non-self-governing territory of New Zealand
Tonga	Sovereign state
Tuvalu	Sovereign state
Wallis and Futuna	Overseas collectivity of France

The Line Islands and the Phoenix Islands, most of which are parts of Kiribati, had no permanent settlements until European colonization, but are often considered to be parts of the Polynesian Triangle.

Polynesians once inhabited the Auckland Islands, the Kermadec Islands, and Norfolk Island in pre-colonial times, but these islands were uninhabited by the time European explorers arrived.

The oceanic islands to the east of Easter Island, such as Clipperton Island, the Galápagos Islands, and the Juan Fernández Islands, were in the past formerly categorized on rare occasion as part of Polynesia. No evidence of prehistoric contact with either Polynesians or the indigenous peoples of the Americas has been found.

==== Outliers ====
===== Micronesia =====
- Kapingamarangi (in the Federated States of Micronesia)
- Nukuoro (in the Federated States of Micronesia)
- Wake Island (a part of the United States Minor Outlying Islands)

===== Sub-Antarctic islands =====
- Auckland Islands (the most southerly known evidence of Polynesian settlement)

===== Melanesia =====
- Anuta (in Solomon Islands)
- Bellona Island (in Solomon Islands)
- Emae (in Vanuatu)
- Fiji (excluding Rotuma and the Lau Islands)
- Mele (in Vanuatu)
- Nuguria (in Papua New Guinea)
- Nukumanu Islands (in Papua New Guinea)
- Ontong Java Atoll (in the Solomon Islands)
- Pileni (in the Solomon Islands)
- Rennell (in the Solomon Islands)
- Sikaiana (in the Solomon Islands)
- Takuu Atoll (in Papua New Guinea)
- Tikopia (in the Solomon Islands)

== History ==
=== Origins and expansion ===
The Polynesian spread of colonization in the Pacific

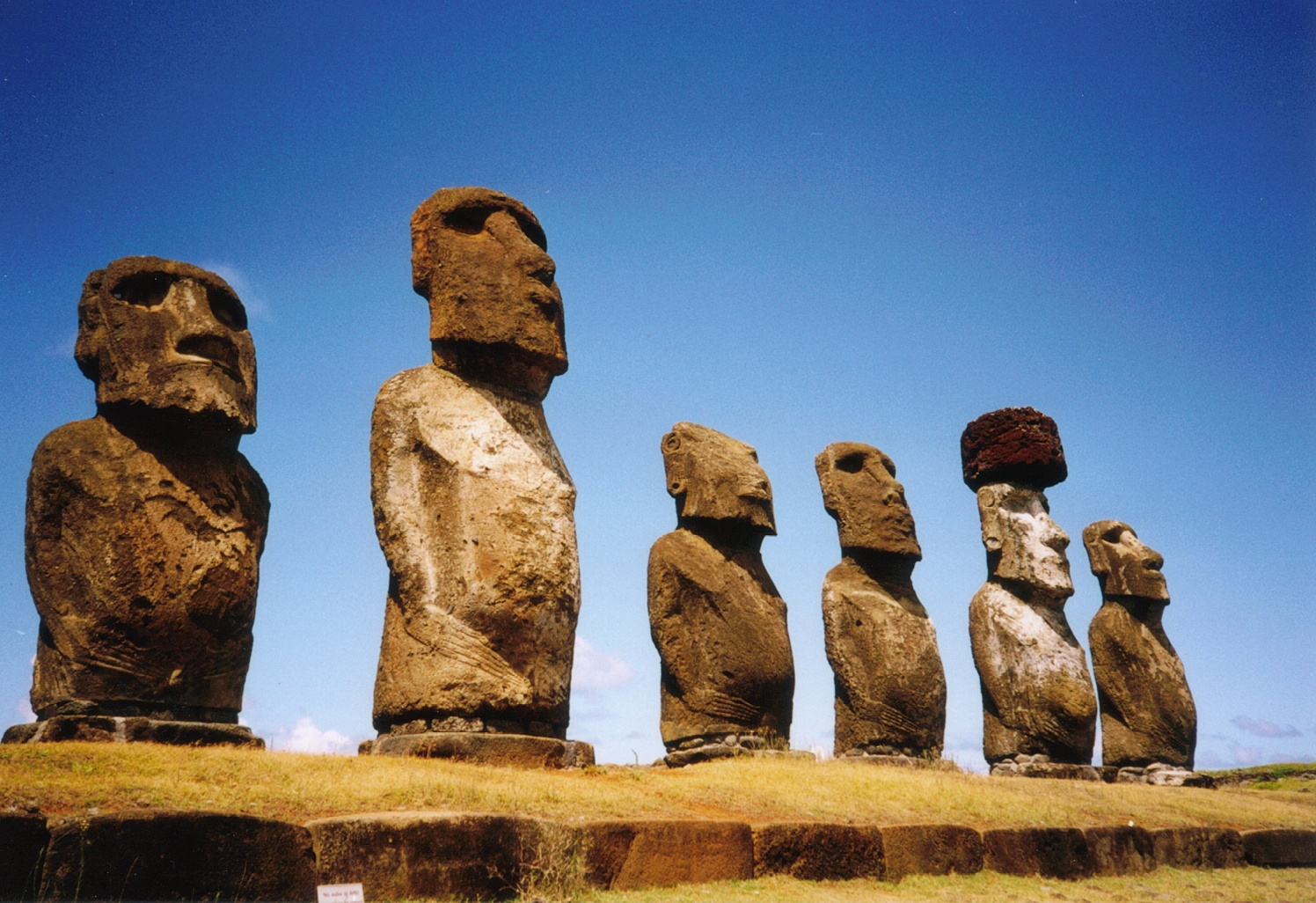
Moai at Ahu Tongariki on Rapa Nui

The Polynesian people are considered, by linguistic, archaeological, and human genetic evidence, a subset of the sea-migrating Austronesian people. Tracing Polynesian languages places their prehistoric origins in Island Melanesia, Maritime Southeast Asia, and ultimately, in Taiwan.

Between about 3000 and 1000 BC, speakers of Austronesian languages spread from Taiwan into Maritime Southeast Asia.

There are three theories regarding the spread of humans across the Pacific to Polynesia. These are outlined well by Kayser et al. (2000) and are as follows:

- Express Train model: A recent (c. 3000–1000 BC) expansion out of Taiwan, via the Philippines and eastern Indonesia and from the northwest ("Bird's Head") of New Guinea, on to Island Melanesia by roughly 1400 BC, reaching western Polynesian islands around 900 BC followed by a roughly 1000 year "pause" before continued settlement in central and eastern Polynesia. This theory is supported by the majority of current genetic, linguistic, and archaeological data.
- Entangled Bank model: Emphasizes the long history of Austronesian speakers' cultural and genetic interactions with indigenous Island Southeast Asians and Melanesians along the way to becoming the first Polynesians.
- Slow Boat model: Similar to the express-train model but with a longer hiatus in Melanesia along with admixture — genetically, culturally and linguistically — with the local population. This is supported by the Y-chromosome data of Kayser et al. (2000), which shows that all three haplotypes of Polynesian Y chromosomes can be traced back to Melanesia.

In the archaeological record, there are well-defined traces of this expansion which allow the path it took to be followed and dated with some certainty. It is thought that by roughly 1400 BC, "Lapita peoples", so-named after their pottery tradition, appeared in the Bismarck Archipelago of northwest Melanesia. This culture is seen as having adapted and evolved through time and space since its emergence "Out of Taiwan". They had given up rice production, for instance, which required paddy field agriculture unsuitable for small islands. However, they still cultivated other ancestral Austronesian staple cultigens like Dioscorea yams and taro (the latter are still grown with smaller-scale paddy field technology), as well as adopting new ones like breadfruit and sweet potato.

Map showing the migration and expansion of the Austronesians which began at about 3000 BC from Taiwan. The Polynesian branch is shown in green.

The results of research at the Teouma Lapita site (Efate Island, Vanuatu) and the Talasiu Lapita site (near Nuku'alofa, Tonga) published in 2016 supports the Express Train model; although with the qualification that the migration bypassed New Guinea and Island Melanesia. The conclusion from research published in 2016 is that the initial population of those two sites appears to come directly from Taiwan or the northern Philippines and did not mix with the 'Australo-Papuans' of New Guinea and the Solomon Islands. The preliminary analysis of skulls found at the Teouma and Talasiu Lapita sites is that they lack Australian or Papuan affinities and instead have affinities to mainland Asian populations.

A 2017 DNA analysis of modern Polynesians indicates that there has been intermarriage resulting in a mixed Austronesian-Papuan ancestry of the Polynesians (as with other modern Austronesians, with the exception of Taiwanese aborigines). Research at the Teouma and Talasiu Lapita sites implies that the migration and intermarriage, which resulted in the mixed Austronesian-Papuan ancestry of the Polynesians, occurred after the first initial migration to Vanuatu and Tonga.

A complete mtDNA and genome-wide SNP comparison (Pugach et al., 2021) of the remains of early settlers of the Mariana Islands and early Lapita individuals from Vanuatu and Tonga also suggest that both migrations originated directly from the same ancient Austronesian source population from the Philippines. The complete absence of "Papuan" admixture in the early samples indicates that these early voyages bypassed eastern Indonesia and the rest of New Guinea. The authors have also suggested a possibility that the early Lapita Austronesians were direct descendants of the early colonists of the Marianas (which preceded them by about 150 years), which is also supported by pottery evidence.

The most eastern site for Lapita archaeological remains recovered so far is at Mulifanua on Upolu. The Mulifanua site, where 4,288 pottery shards have been found and studied, has a "true" age of c. 1000 BC based on radiocarbon dating and is the oldest site yet discovered in Polynesia. This is mirrored by a 2010 study also placing the beginning of the human archaeological sequences of Polynesia in Tonga at 900 BC.

Within a mere three or four centuries, between 1300 and 900 BC, the Lapita archaeological culture spread 6,000 km further to the east from the Bismarck Archipelago, until reaching as far as Fiji, Tonga, and Samoa. A cultural divide began to develop between Fiji to the west, and the distinctive Polynesian language and culture emerging on Tonga and Samoa to the east. Where there was once faint evidence of uniquely shared developments in Fijian and Polynesian speech, most of this is now called "borrowing" and is thought to have occurred in those and later years more than as a result of continuing unity of their earliest dialects on those far-flung lands. Contacts were mediated especially through the Tovata confederacy of Fiji. This is where most Fijian-Polynesian linguistic interactions occurred.

In the chronology of the exploration and first populating of Polynesia, there is a gap commonly referred to as the long pause between the first populating of Fiji (Melanesia), Western Polynesia of Tonga and Samoa among others and the settlement of the rest of the region. In general this gap is considered to have lasted roughly 1,000 years. The cause of this gap in voyaging is contentious among archaeologists with a number of competing theories presented including climate shifts, the need for the development of new voyaging techniques, and cultural shifts.

After the long pause, dispersion of populations into central and eastern Polynesia began. Although the exact timing of when each island group was settled is debated, it is widely accepted that the island groups in the geographic center of the region (i.e. the Cook Islands, Society Islands, Marquesas Islands, etc.) were settled initially between 1000 and 1150 AD, and ending with more far-flung island groups such as Hawaii, New Zealand, and Easter Island settled between 1200 and 1300 AD.

Tiny populations may have been involved in the initial settlement of individual islands; although Professor Matisoo-Smith of the Otago study said that the founding Māori population of New Zealand must have been in the hundreds, much larger than previously thought. The Polynesian population experienced a founder effect and genetic drift. The Polynesian may be distinctively different both genotypically and phenotypically from the parent population from which it is derived. This is due to new population being established by a very small number of individuals from a larger population which also causes a loss of genetic variation.

Atholl Anderson wrote that analysis of mitochondrial DNA (mtDNA, female) and Y chromosome (male) concluded that the ancestors of Polynesian women were Austronesians while those of Polynesian men were Papuans. Subsequently, it was found that 96% (or 93.8%) of Polynesian mtDNA has an Asian origin, as does one-third of Polynesian Y chromosomes; the remaining two-thirds from New Guinea and nearby islands; this is consistent with matrilocal residence patterns. Polynesians existed from the intermixing of few ancient Austronesian-Melanesian founders, genetically they belong almost entirely to the Haplogroup B (mtDNA), which is the marker of Austronesian expansions. The high frequencies of mtDNA Haplogroup B in the Polynesians are the result of founder effect and represents the descendants of a few Austronesian females who intermixed with Papuan males.

A genomic analysis of modern populations in Polynesia, published in 2021, provides a model of the direction and timing of Polynesian migrations from Samoa to the islands to the east. This model presents consistencies and inconsistencies with models of Polynesian migration that are based on archaeology and linguistic analysis. The 2021 genomic model presents a migration pathway from Samoa to the Cook Islands (Rarotonga), then to the Society Islands (Tōtaiete mā) in the 11th century AD, the western Austral Islands (Tuha'a Pae) and the Tuāmotu Archipelago in the 12th century AD, with the migrant pathway branching to the north to the Marquesas (Te Henua 'Enana), to Raivavae in the south, and to the easternmost destination on Easter Island (Rapa Nui), which was settled in approximately 1200 AD via Mangareva.

=== Culture ===
The Polynesians were matrilineal and matrilocal Stone Age societies upon their arrival in Tonga, Samoa and the surrounding islands, after having spent at least some time in the Bismarck Archipelago. The modern Polynesians still show human genetic results of a Melanesian culture which allowed indigenous men, but not women, to "marry in" – useful evidence for matrilocality.

Although matrilocality and matrilineality receded at some early time, Polynesians and most other Austronesian speakers in the Pacific Islands were and are still highly "matricentric" in their traditional jurisprudence. The Lapita pottery for which the general archaeological complex of the earliest "Oceanic" Austronesian speakers in the Pacific Islands are named also lapsed in Western Polynesia. Language, social life and material culture were very distinctly "Polynesian" by 1000 BC.

Early European observers detected theocratic elements in traditional Polynesian government.

Linguistically, there are five sub-groups of the Polynesian language group. Each represents a region within Polynesia and the categorization of these language groups by Green in 1966 helped to confirm that Polynesian settlement generally took place from west to east. There is a very distinct "East Polynesian" subgroup with many shared innovations not seen in other Polynesian languages. The Marquesas dialects are perhaps the source of the oldest Hawaiian speech which is overlaid by Tahitian-variety speech, as Hawaiian oral histories would suggest. The earliest varieties of New Zealand Māori speech may have had multiple sources from around central Eastern Polynesia, as Māori oral histories would suggest.

=== Political history ===
==== Cook Islands ====
The Cook Islands are made up of 15 islands comprising the Northern and Southern groups. The islands are spread out across many square kilometers of a vast ocean. The largest of these islands is called Rarotonga, which is also the political and economic capital of the nation.

The Cook Islands were formerly known as the Hervey Islands, but this name refers only to the Northern Groups. It is unknown when this name was changed to reflect the current name. It is thought that the Cook Islands were settled in two periods: the Tahitian Period, when the country was settled between 900 and 1300 AD, and the Maui Settlement, which occurred in 1600 AD, when a large contingent from Tahiti settled in Rarotonga, in the Takitumu district.

The first contact between Europeans and the native inhabitants of the Cook Islands took place in 1595 with the arrival of Spanish explorer Álvaro de Mendaña in Pukapuka, who called it San Bernardo (Saint Bernard). A decade later, navigator Pedro Fernández de Quirós made the first European landing in the islands when he set foot on Rakahanga in 1606, calling it Gente Hermosa (Beautiful People).

Cook Islanders are ethnically Polynesians or Eastern Polynesia. They are culturally associated with Tahiti, Eastern Islands, New Zealand Māori and Hawaii.

==== Fiji ====
The Lau Islands were subject to periods of Tongan rulership and then Fijian control until their eventual conquest by Seru Epenisa Cakobau of the Kingdom of Fiji by 1871. In around 1855 a Tongan prince, Enele Ma'afu, proclaimed the Lau islands as his kingdom, and took the title Tui Lau.

Fiji had been ruled by numerous divided chieftains until Cakobau unified the landmass. The Lapita culture, the ancestors of the Polynesians, existed in Fiji from about 1000 BC until they were displaced by the Melanesians about a thousand years later. (Both Samoans and subsequent Polynesian cultures adopted Melanesian painting and tattoo methods.)

In 1873, Cakobau ceded a Fiji heavily indebted to foreign creditors to the United Kingdom. It became independent on 10 October 1970 and a republic on 28 September 1987.

Fiji is classified as Melanesian and (less commonly) Polynesian.

==== Hawaii ====
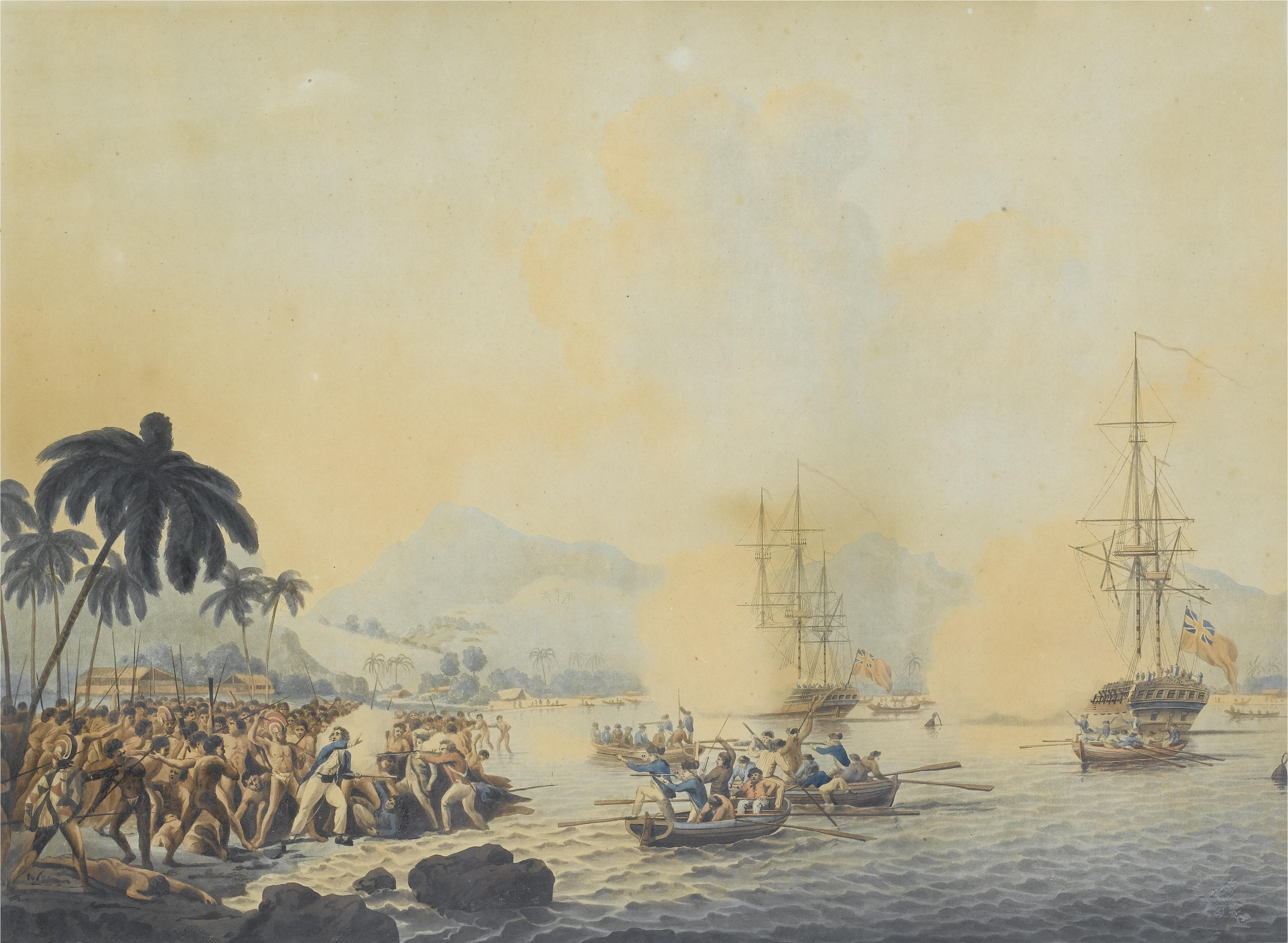
On February 14, 1779, Capt. James Cook was killed on the island of Hawaii.

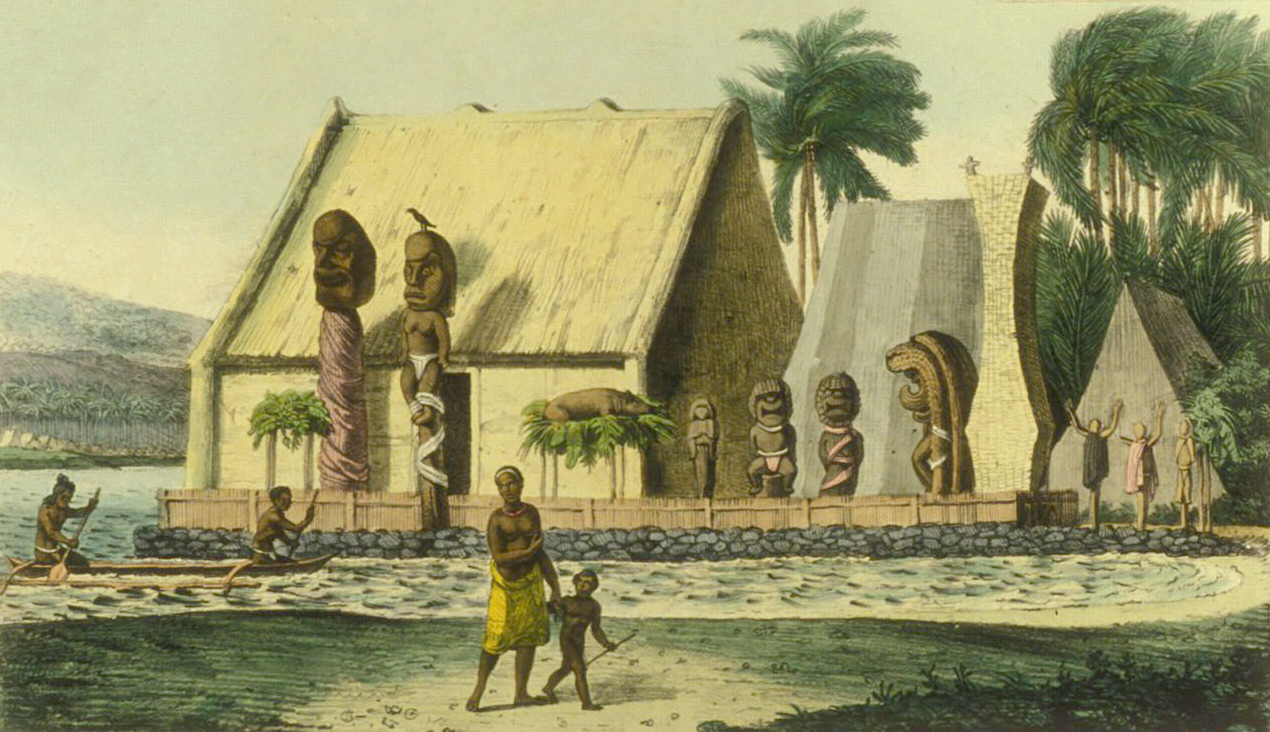
A depiction of a royal heiau (Hawaiian temple) at Kealakekua Bay, c. 1816

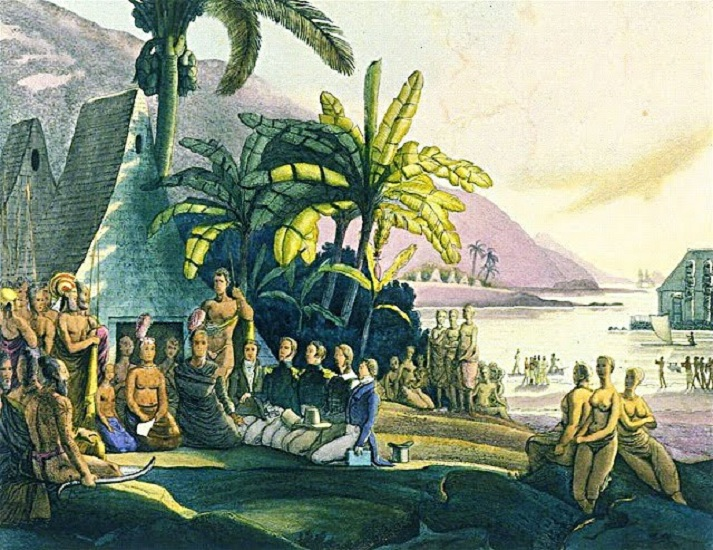
King Kamehameha I receiving the Russian naval expedition of Otto von Kotzebue. Drawing by Louis Choris in 1816.

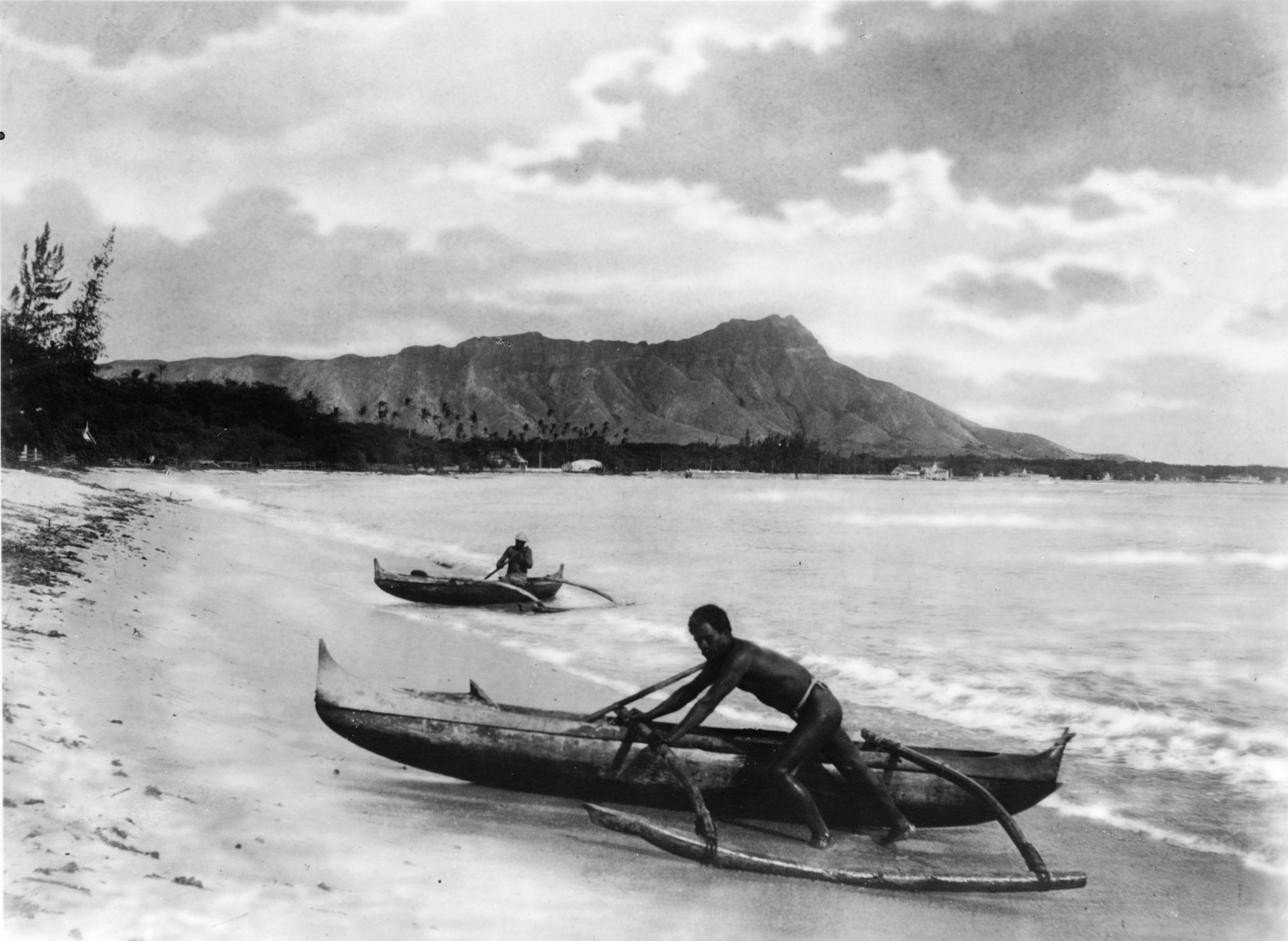
Polynesians with outrigger canoes at Waikiki Beach, Oahu Island, early 20th century

==== New Zealand ====
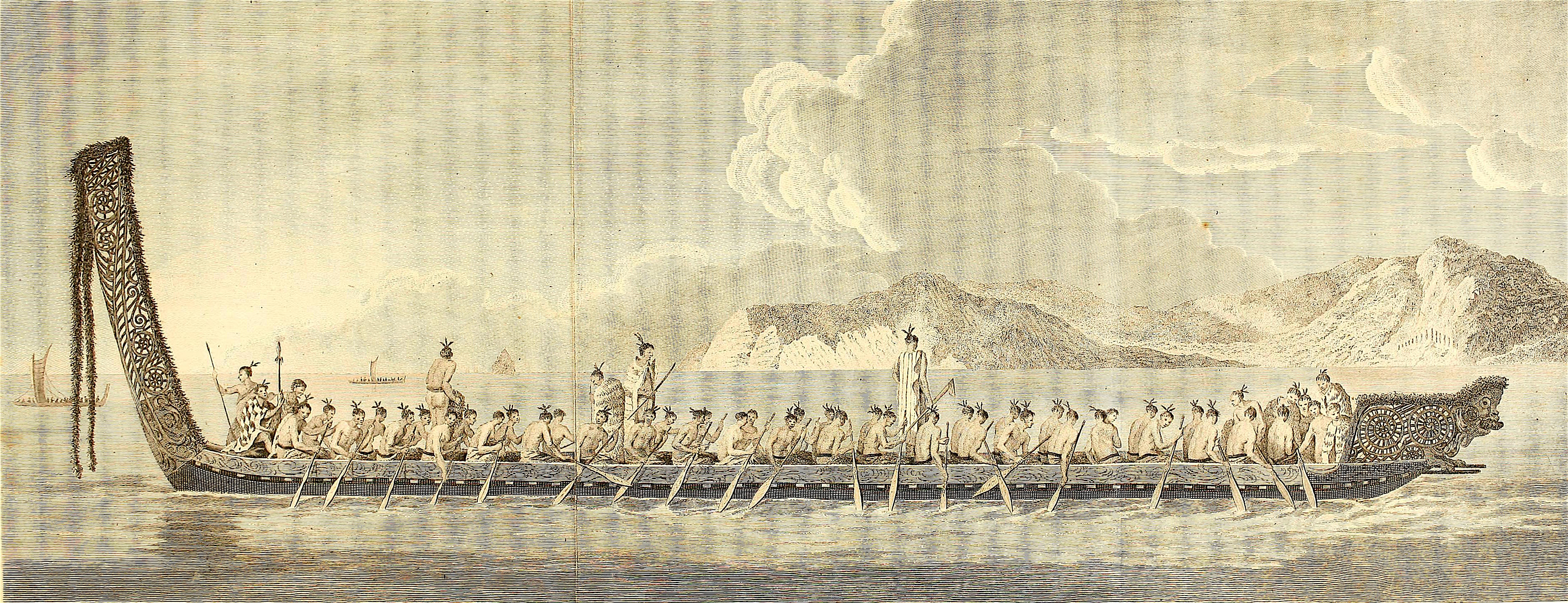
Māori war canoe (waka) drawn after James Cook's voyage to New Zealand.

Beginning in the late 13th and early 14th centuries, Polynesians began to migrate in waves to New Zealand via their canoes, settling on both the North and South islands as well as the Chatham Islands. Over the course of several centuries, the Polynesian settlers formed distinct cultures that became known as the Māori on the New Zealand mainland, while those who settled in the Chatham Islands became the Moriori people. Beginning the 17th century, the arrival of Europeans to New Zealand drastically impacted Māori culture. Settlers from Europe (known as "Pākehā") began to colonize New Zealand in the 19th century, leading to tension with the indigenous Māori. On October 28, 1835, a group of Māori tribesmen issued a declaration of independence (drafted by Scottish businessman James Busby) as the "United Tribes of New Zealand", in order to resist potential efforts at colonizing New Zealand by the French and prevent merchant ships and their cargo which belonged to Māori merchants from being seized at foreign ports. The new state received recognition from the British Crown in 1836.

In 1840 Royal Navy officer William Hobson and several Māori chiefs signed the Treaty of Waitangi, which transformed New Zealand into a colony of the British Empire and granting all Māori the status of British subjects. However, tensions between Pākehā settlers and the Māori over settler encroachment on Māori lands and disputes over land sales led to the New Zealand Wars (1845–1872) between the colonial government and the Māori. In response to the conflict, the colonial government initiated a series of land confiscations from the Māori. This social upheaval, combined with epidemics of infectious diseases from Europe, devastated both the Māori population and their social standing in New Zealand. In the 20th and 21st centuries, the Māori population began to recover, and efforts were made to redress social, economic, political and economic issues facing the Māori in wider New Zealand society. Beginning in the 1960s, a protest movement emerged seeking redress for historical grievances. In the 2013 New Zealand census, roughly 600,000 people in New Zealand identified as being Māori.

==== Samoa ====
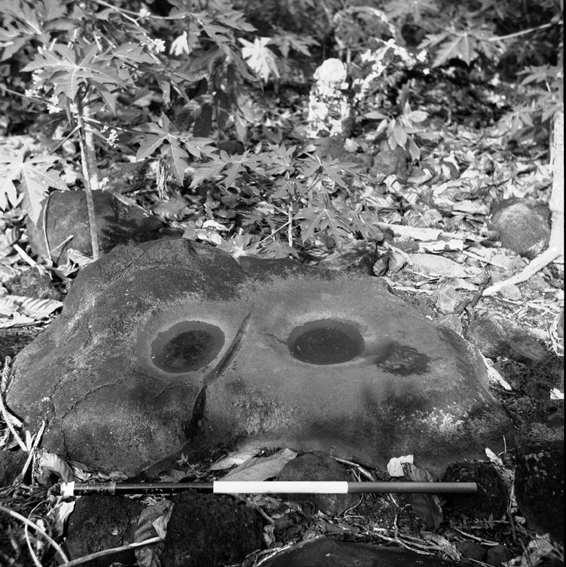
Grinding stones discovered from archaeology in Samoa

In the 9th century, the Tui Manuʻa controlled a vast maritime empire comprising most of the settled islands of Polynesia. The Tui Manuʻa is one of the oldest Samoan titles in Samoa. Traditional oral literature of Samoa and Manu'a talks of a widespread Polynesian network or confederacy (or "empire") that was prehistorically ruled by the successive Tui Manuʻa dynasties. Manuan genealogies and religious oral literature also suggest that the Tui Manuʻa had long been one of the most prestigious and powerful paramount of Samoa. Oral history suggests that the Tui Manuʻa kings governed a confederacy of far-flung islands which included Fiji, Tonga as well as smaller western Pacific chiefdoms and Polynesian outliers such as Uvea, Futuna, Tokelau, and Tuvalu. Commerce and exchange routes between the western Polynesian societies are well documented and it is speculated that the Tui Manuʻa dynasty grew through its success in obtaining control over the oceanic trade of currency goods such as finely woven ceremonial mats, whale ivory "tabua", obsidian and basalt tools, chiefly red feathers, and seashells reserved for royalty (such as polished nautilus and the egg cowry).

Samoa's long history of various ruling families continued until well after the decline of the Tui Manuʻa's power, with the western isles of Savaiʻi and Upolu rising to prominence in the post-Tongan occupation period and the establishment of the tafaʻifa system that dominated Samoan politics well into the 20th century. This was disrupted in the early 1900s due to colonial intervention, with east–west division by Tripartite Convention (1899) and subsequent annexation by the German Empire and the United States. The German-controlled Western portion of Samoa (consisting of the bulk of Samoan territory – Savaiʻi, Apolima, Manono and Upolu) was occupied by New Zealand in WWI, and administered by it under a Class C League of Nations mandate. After repeated efforts by the Samoan independence movement, the New Zealand Western Samoa Act of 24 November 1961 granted Samoa independence, effective on January 1, 1962, upon which the Trusteeship Agreement terminated. The new Independent State of Samoa was not a monarchy, though the Malietoa titleholder remained very influential. It effectively ended however with the death of Malietoa Tanumafili II, the country's head of state, on May 11, 2007.

==== Tonga ====
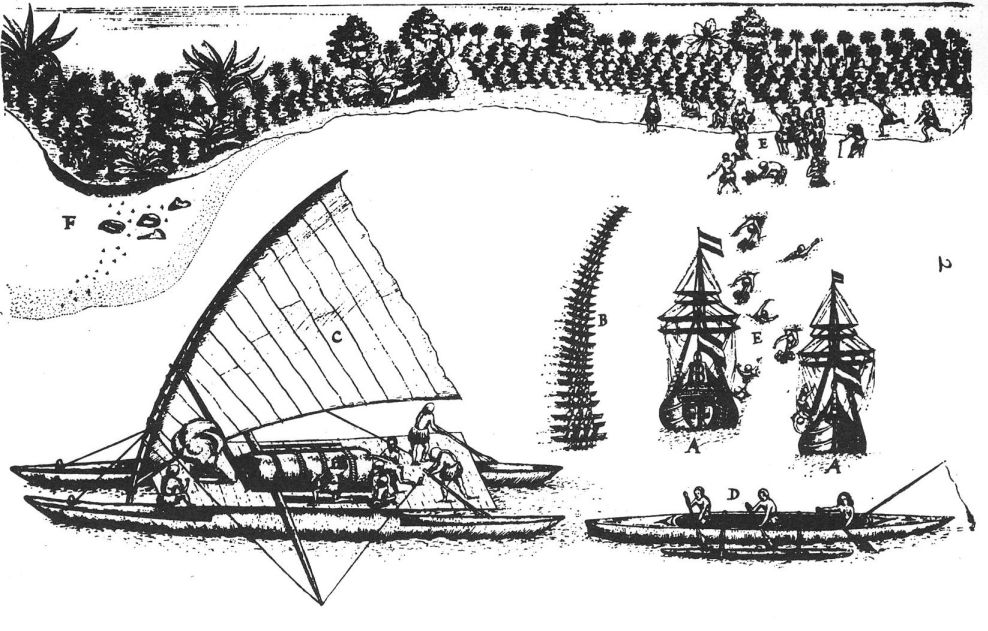
The arrival of Abel Tasman in Tongatapu, 1643; drawing by Isaack Gilsemans

In the 10th century, the Tuʻi Tonga Empire was established in Tonga, and most of the Western Pacific came within its sphere of influence, up to parts of the Solomon Islands. The Tongan influence brought Polynesian customs and language throughout most of Polynesia. The empire began to decline in the 13th century.

After a bloody civil war, political power in Tonga eventually fell under the Tuʻi Kanokupolu dynasty in the 16th century.

In 1845, the ambitious young warrior, strategist, and orator Tāufaʻāhau united Tonga into a more Western-style kingdom. He held the chiefly title of Tuʻi Kanokupolu, but had been baptised with the name Jiaoji ("George") in 1831. In 1875, with the help of the missionary Shirley Waldemar Baker, he declared Tonga a constitutional monarchy, formally adopted the western royal style, emancipated the "serfs", enshrined a code of law, land tenure, and freedom of the press, and limited the power of the chiefs.

Tonga became a British protectorate under a Treaty of Friendship on 18 May 1900, when European settlers and rival Tongan chiefs tried to oust the second king. Despite being under the protectorate, Tonga retained its monarchy and most of its local laws without interruption, with Britain exercising varying degrees of influence through consuls appointed by the Western Pacific High Commission. On June 4, 1970, the Kingdom of Tonga became independent from the British Empire.

==== Tuvalu ====
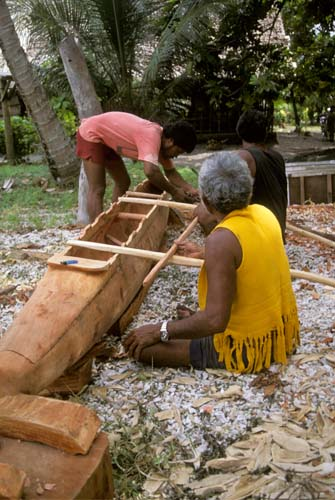
Canoe carving on Nanumea atoll, Tuvalu

The reef islands and atolls of Tuvalu are identified as being part of West Polynesia. During pre-European-contact times there was frequent canoe voyaging between the islands as Polynesian navigation skills are recognised to have allowed deliberate journeys on double-hull sailing canoes or outrigger canoes. Eight of the nine islands of Tuvalu were inhabited; thus the name, Tuvalu, means "eight standing together" in Tuvaluan. The pattern of settlement that is believed to have occurred is that the Polynesians spread out from Samoa and Tonga into the Tuvaluan atolls, with Tuvalu providing a stepping stone for migration into the Polynesian outlier communities in Melanesia and Micronesia.

Stories as to the ancestors of the Tuvaluans vary from island to island. On Niutao, Funafuti and Vaitupu the founding ancestor is described as being from Samoa; whereas on Nanumea the founding ancestor is described as being from Tonga.

The extent of influence of the Tuʻi Tonga line of Tongan kings, which originated in the 10th century, is understood to have extended to some of the islands of Tuvalu in the 11th to mid-13th century. The oral history of Niutao recalls that in the 15th century Tongan warriors were defeated in a battle on the reef of Niutao. Tongan warriors also invaded Niutao later in the 15th century and again were repelled. A third and fourth Tongan invasion of Niutao occurred in the late 16th century, again with the Tongans being defeated.

Tuvalu was first sighted by Europeans in January 1568 during the voyage of Spanish navigator Álvaro de Mendaña de Neira who sailed past the island of Nui, and charted it as Isla de Jesús (Spanish for "Island of Jesus") because the previous day was the feast of the Holy Name. Mendaña made contact with the islanders but did not land. During Mendaña's second voyage across the Pacific he passed Niulakita in August 1595, which he named La Solitaria, meaning "the solitary one".

Fishing was the primary source of protein, with the Tuvaluan cuisine reflecting food that could be grown on low-lying atolls. Navigation between the islands of Tuvalu was carried out using outrigger canoes. The population levels of the low-lying islands of Tuvalu had to be managed because of the effects of periodic droughts and the risk of severe famine if the gardens were poisoned by salt from the storm surge of a tropical cyclone.

== Links to the Americas ==
The sweet potato, called kūmara in Māori and kumar in Quechua, is native to the Americas and was widespread in Polynesia when Europeans first reached the Pacific. Remains of the plant in the Cook Islands have been radiocarbon-dated to before 1400, and the present scholarly consensus is that it was brought to central Polynesia c. 1300 by Polynesians who had traveled to South America and back, from where it spread across the region. Some genetic evidence suggests that sweet potatoes may have reached Polynesia via seeds at least 100,000 years ago, pre-dating human arrival; however, this hypothesis fails to account for the similarity of names.

There are also other possible material and cultural evidence of Pre-Columbian contact by Polynesia with the Americas with varying levels of plausibility. These include chickens, coconuts, and bottle gourds. The question of whether Polynesians reached the Americas and the extent of cultural and material influences resulting from such a contact remains highly contentious among anthropologists.

One of the most enduring misconceptions about Polynesians was that they originated from the Americas. This was due to Thor Heyerdahl's proposals in the mid-20th century that the Polynesians had migrated in two waves of migrations: one by Native Americans from the northwest coast of Canada by large whale-hunting dugouts; and the other from South America by "bearded white men" with "reddish to blond hair" and "blue-grey eyes" led by a high priest and sun-king named "Kon-Tiki" on balsa-log rafts. He claimed the "white men" then "civilized" the dark-skinned natives in Polynesia. He set out to prove this by embarking on a highly publicized Kon-Tiki expedition on a primitive raft with a Scandinavian crew. It captured the public's attention, making the Kon-Tiki a household name.

None of Heyerdahl's proposals have been accepted in the scientific community. The anthropologist Wade Davis in his book The Wayfinders, criticized Heyerdahl as having "ignored the overwhelming body of linguistic, ethnographic, and ethnobotanical evidence, augmented today by genetic and archaeological data, indicating that he was patently wrong." Anthropologist Robert Carl Suggs included a chapter titled "The Kon-Tiki Myth" in his 1960 book on Polynesia, concluding that "The Kon-Tiki theory is about as plausible as the tales of Atlantis, Mu, and 'Children of the Sun'. Like most such theories, it makes exciting light reading, but as an example of scientific method it fares quite poorly." Other authors have also criticized Heyerdahl's hypothesis for its implicit racism in attributing advances in Polynesian society to "white people", at the same time ignoring relatively advanced Austronesian maritime technology in favor of a primitive balsa raft.

In July 2020, a novel high-density genome-wide DNA analysis of Polynesians and Native South Americans reported that there has been intermingling between Polynesian people and pre-Columbian Zenú people in a period dated between 1150 and 1380 AD. Whether this happened because of indigenous American people reaching eastern Polynesia or because the northern coast of South America was visited by Polynesians is not clear yet.

== Cultures ==
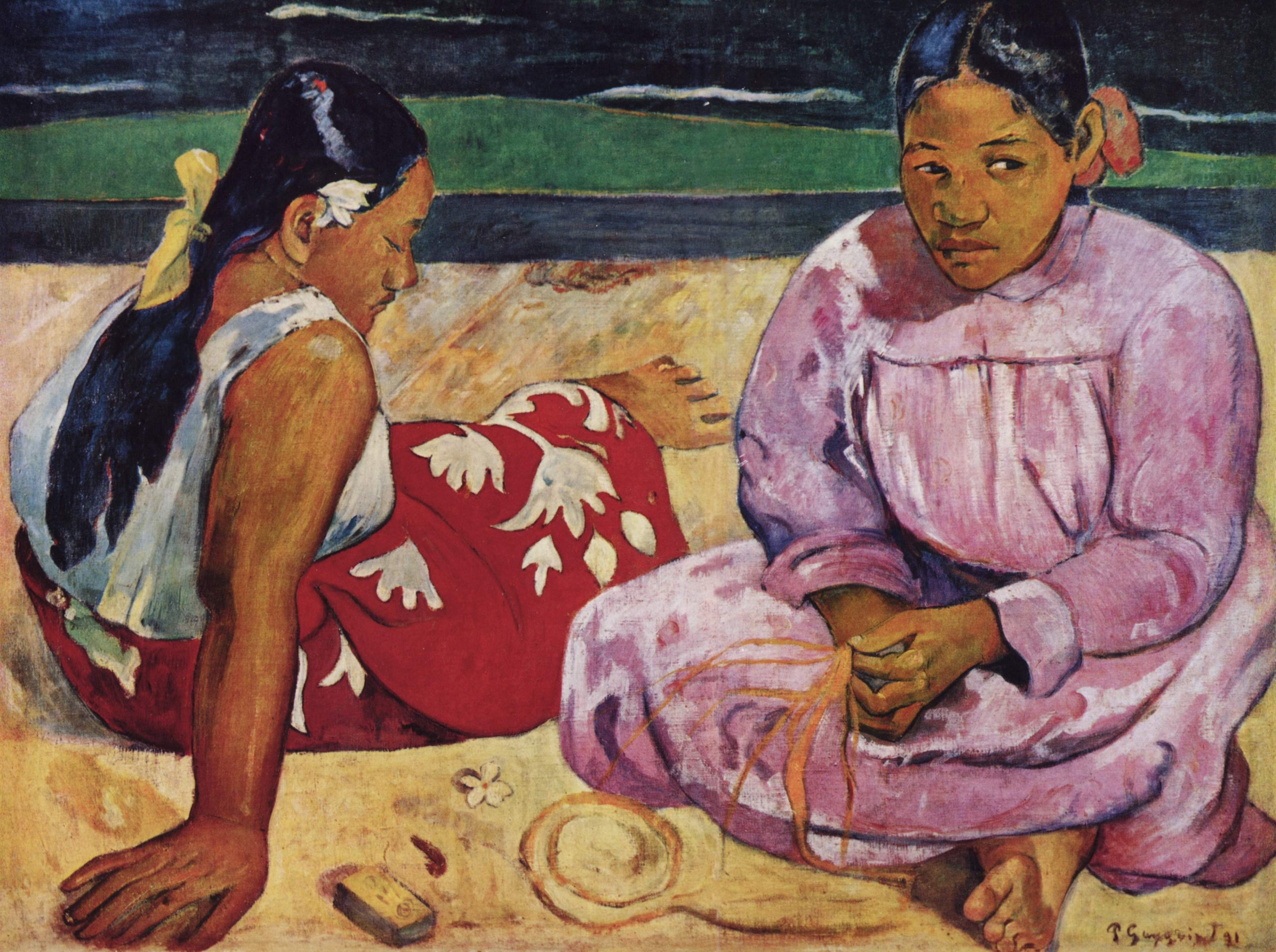
Painting of Tahitian Women on the Beach by Paul Gauguin—Musée d'Orsay

Polynesia divides into two distinct cultural groups, East Polynesia and West Polynesia. The culture of West Polynesia is conditioned to high populations. It has strong institutions of marriage and well-developed judicial, monetary and trading traditions. West Polynesia consists of the groups of Tonga, Samoa and surrounding islands. The pattern of settlement to East Polynesia began from Samoan Islands into the Tuvaluan atolls, with Tuvalu providing a stepping stone to migration into the Polynesian outlier communities in Melanesia and Micronesia.

Eastern Polynesian cultures are highly adapted to smaller islands and atolls, principally Niue, the Cook Islands, Tahiti, the Tuamotus, the Marquesas, Hawaii, Rapa Nui, and smaller central-pacific groups. The large islands of New Zealand were first settled by Eastern Polynesians who adapted their culture to a non-tropical environment.

Unlike western Melanesia, leaders were chosen in Polynesia based on their hereditary bloodline. Samoa, however, had another system of government that combines elements of heredity and real-world skills to choose leaders. This system is called Fa'amatai. According to Ben R. Finney and Eric M. Jones, "On Tahiti, for example, the 35,000 Polynesians living there at the time of European discovery were divided between high-status persons with full access to food and other resources, and low-status persons with limited access."

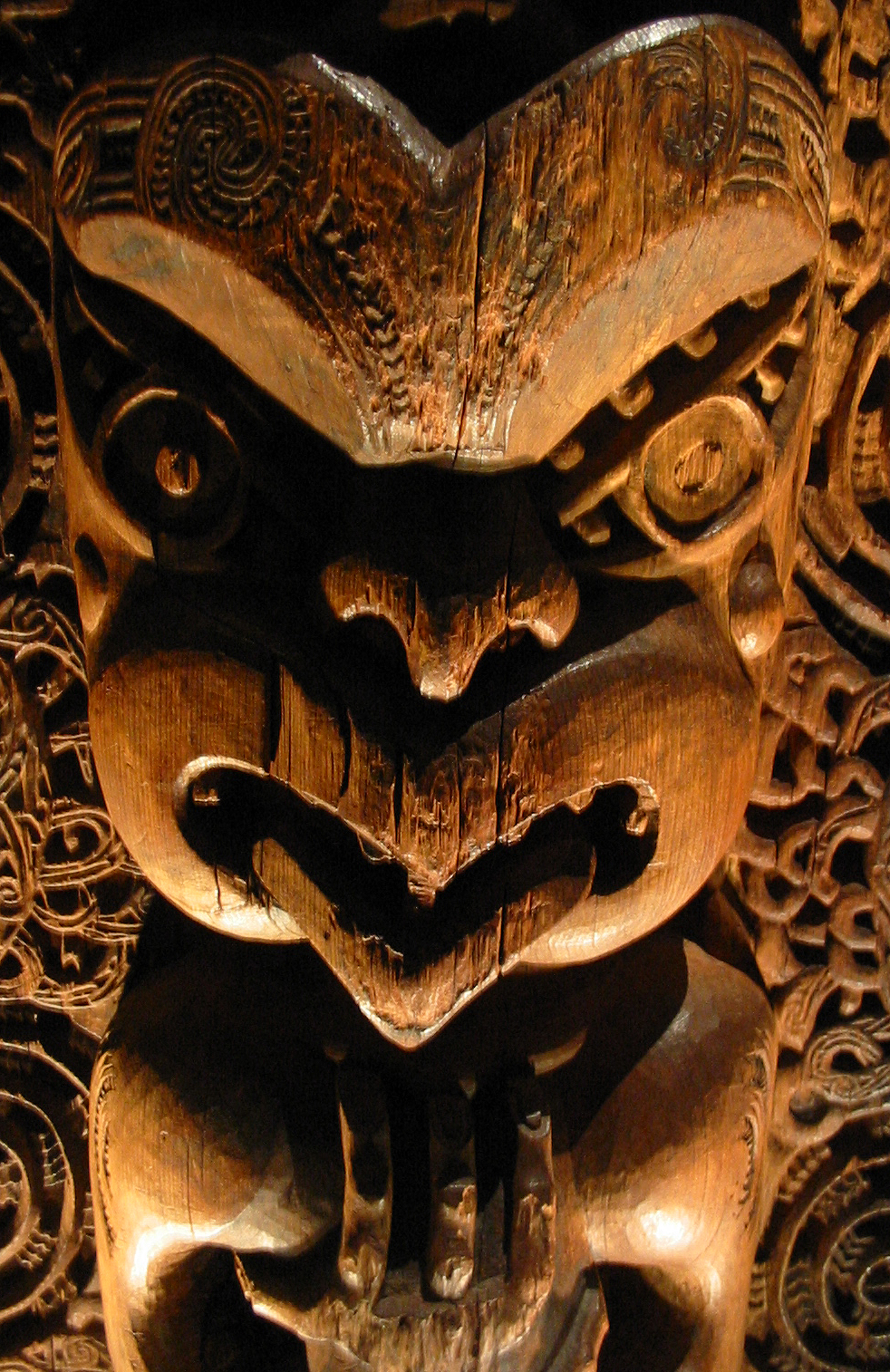
Carving from the ridgepole of a Māori house, ca 1840

Religion, farming, fishing, weather prediction, out-rigger canoe (similar to modern catamarans) construction and navigation were highly developed skills because the population of an entire island depended on them. Trading of both luxuries and mundane items was important to all groups. Periodic droughts and subsequent famines often led to war. Many low-lying islands could suffer severe famine if their gardens were poisoned by the salt from the storm surge of a tropical cyclone. In these cases fishing, the primary source of protein, would not ease the loss of food energy. Navigators, in particular, were highly respected and each island maintained a house of navigation with a canoe-building area.

Settlements by the Polynesians were of two categories: the hamlet and the village. The size of the island inhabited determined whether or not a hamlet would be built. The larger volcanic islands usually had hamlets because of the many zones that could be divided across the island. Food and resources were more plentiful. These settlements of four to five houses (usually with gardens) were established so that there would be no overlap between the zones. Villages, on the other hand, were built on the coasts of smaller islands and consisted of thirty or more houses—in the case of atolls, on only one of the group so that food cultivation was on the others. Usually, these villages were fortified with walls and palisades made of stone and wood.

However, New Zealand demonstrates the opposite: large volcanic islands with fortified villages.

As well as being great navigators, these people were artists and artisans of great skill. Simple objects, such as fish-hooks would be manufactured to exacting standards for different catches and decorated even when the decoration was not part of the function. Stone and wooden weapons were considered to be more powerful the better they were made and decorated. In some island groups weaving was a strong part of the culture and giving woven articles as gifts was an ingrained practice. Dwellings were imbued with character by the skill of their building. Body decoration and jewelry is of an international standard to this day.

The religious attributes of Polynesians were common over the whole Pacific region. While there are some differences in their spoken languages they largely have the same explanation for the creation of the earth and sky, for the gods that rule aspects of life and for the religious practices of everyday life. People traveled thousands of miles to celebrations that they all owned communally.

Beginning in the 1820s large numbers of missionaries worked in the islands, converting many groups to Christianity. Polynesia, argues Ian Breward, is now "one of the most strongly Christian regions in the world ... Christianity was rapidly and successfully incorporated into Polynesian culture. War and slavery disappeared."

== Demographics ==
The countries and territories in this table are categorised according to sources in cross-referenced articles; where sources differ, provisos have been clearly indicated. These territories and regions are subject to various additional categorisations, depending on the source and purpose of each description.

Region, followed by country	Area (km^{2})	Population (2021)	Population density (per km^{2})	Capital	ISO 3166-1
American Samoa (United States)	199	45,035	279.4	Pago Pago, Fagatogo	AS
Cook Islands	240	17,003	72.4	Avarua	CK
Easter Island (Chile)	164	5,761	35.1	Hanga Roa	CL
French Polynesia (France)	4,167	304,032	67.2	Papeete	PF
Hawaii (United States)	16,636	1,360,301	81.8	Honolulu	US
Johnston Atoll (United States)	276.6	0	0	Johnston Atoll	UM
Midway Atoll (United States)	2,355	39	6.37	Midway Atoll	UM
New Zealand (Note: Part of Australasia according to the UN)	268,680	5,129,727	17.3	Wellington	NZ
Niue	260	1,937	6.2	Alofi	NU
Pitcairn Islands (United Kingdom)	47	47	1	Adamstown	PN
Samoa	2,944	218,764	66.3	Apia	WS
Tokelau (New Zealand)	10	1,849	128.2	Atafu (de facto)	TK
Tonga	748	106,017	143.2	Nukuʻalofa	TO
Tuvalu	26	11,204	426.8	Funafuti	TV
Wallis and Futuna (France)	274	11,627	43.4	Mata-Utu	WF
Polynesia (total excluding New Zealand)	25,715	2,047,444	79.6		
Polynesia (total including New Zealand)	294,395	7,177,171	24.4		

== Languages ==
Polynesian languages are all members of the family of Oceanic languages, a sub-branch of the Austronesian language family. Polynesian languages show a considerable degree of similarity. The vowels are generally the same—/a/, /e/, /i/, /o/, and /u/, pronounced as in Italian, Spanish, and German—and the consonants are always followed by a vowel. The languages of various island groups show changes in consonants. The glottal stop /ʔ/ is increasingly represented by an inverted comma or ʻokina. In the Society Islands, the original Proto-Polynesian *k and *ŋ (or the ng sound) have merged as /ʔ/, *s changed to /h/, and *w changed to /v/; so the name for the ancestral homeland, deriving from Proto-Nuclear Polynesian *sawaiki, becomes Havaiʻi. In New Zealand, where *s changed to /h/, the ancient home is Hawaiki. In the Cook Islands, where /ʔ/ replaces *s (with a likely intermediate stage of *h) and /v/ replaces *w, it is ʻAvaiki. In the Hawaiian islands, where /ʔ/ and /h/ replace *k and *s, respectively, the largest island of the group is named Hawaiʻi. In Samoa, where /v/ and /ʔ/ replace *w and *k, respectively, the largest island is called Savaiʻi.

Maritime Polynesian Pidgin based on Tahitian, Māori and Hawaiian was a common regional trade language used between European voyagers and local islanders between 18th to 19th centuries before supplanted by English.

== Economy ==
With the exception of New Zealand, the majority of independent Polynesian islands derive much of their income from foreign aid and remittances from those who live in other countries. Some encourage their young people to go where they can earn good money to remit to their stay-at-home relatives. Many Polynesian locations, such as Easter Island, supplement this with tourism income. Some have more unusual sources of income, such as Tuvalu which marketed its '.tv' internet top-level domain name or the Cooks that relied on postage stamp sales.

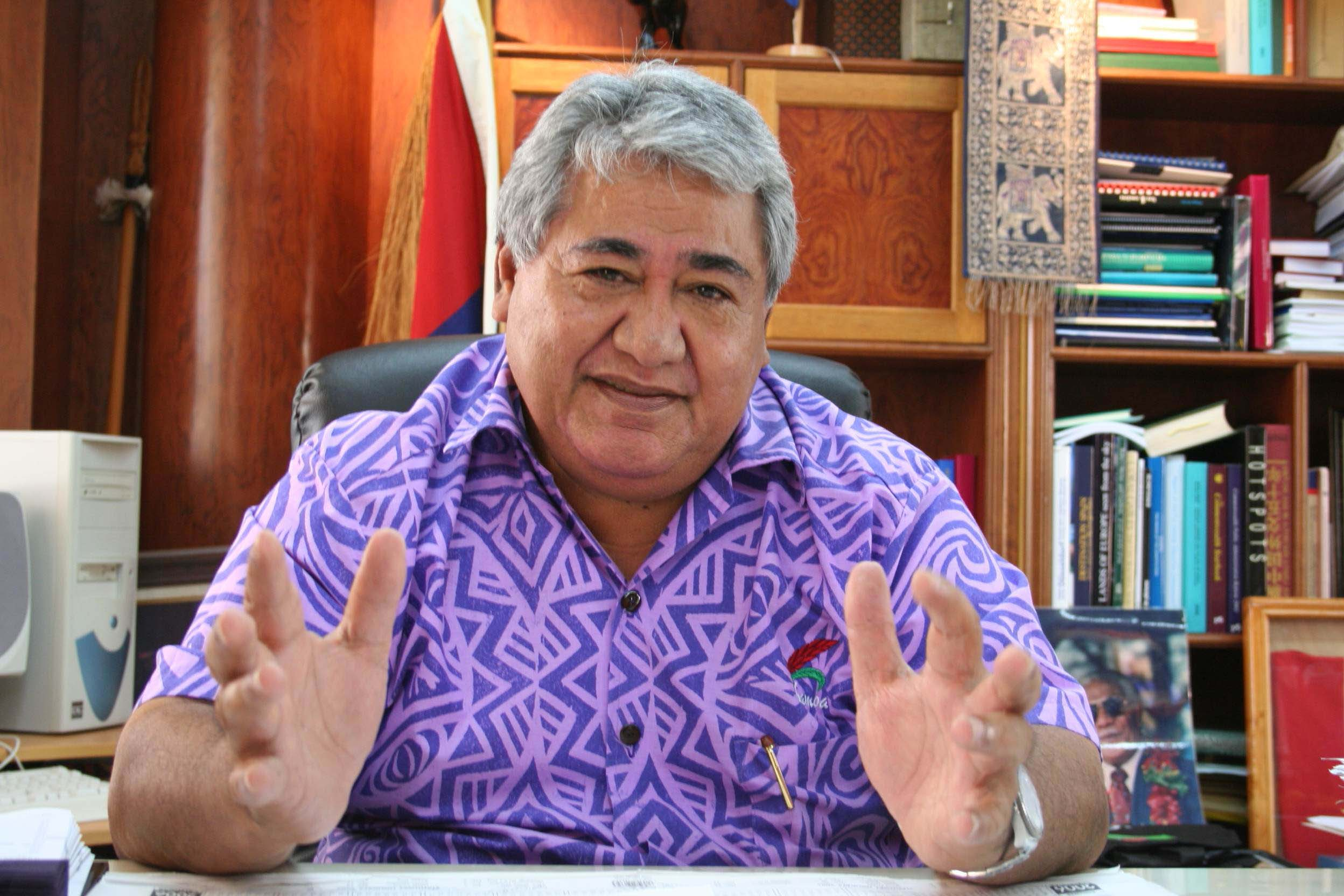
Tuilaepa Sailele Malielegaoi, Prime Minister of Samoa from 1998 to 2021, who initiated the Polynesian Leaders Group in late 2011.

Aside from New Zealand, another focus area of economic dependence regarding tourism is Hawaii. Hawaii is one of the most visited areas within the Polynesian Triangle, entertaining more than ten million visitors annually, excluding 2020. The economy of Hawaii, like that of New Zealand, is steadily dependent on annual tourists and financial counseling or aid from other countries or states. "The rate of tourist growth has made the economy overly dependent on this one sector, leaving Hawaii extremely vulnerable to external economic forces." By keeping this in mind, island states and nations similar to Hawaii are paying closer attention to other avenues that can positively affect their economy by practicing more independence and less emphasis on tourist entertainment.

== Inter-Polynesian cooperation ==
The first major attempt at uniting the Polynesian islands was by Imperial Japan in the 1930s, when various theorists (chiefly Hachirō Arita) began promulgating the idea of what would soon become known as the Greater East Asia Co-Prosperity Sphere. Under the Greater East Asia Co-Prosperity Sphere, all nations stretching from Southeast Asia and Northeast Asia to Oceania would be united under one, large, cultural and economic bloc which would be free from Western imperialism. The policy theorists who conceived it, along with the Japanese public, largely saw it as a pan-Asian movement driven by ideals of freedom and independence from Western colonial oppression. In practice, however, it was frequently corrupted by militarists who saw it as an effective policy vehicle through which to strengthen Japan's position and advance its dominance within Asia. At its greatest extent, it stretched from Japanese occupied Indochina in the west to the Gilbert Islands in the east, although it was originally planned to stretch as far east as Hawaii and Easter Island and as far west as India. This never came to fruition, however, as Japan was defeated during World War II and subsequently lost all power and influence it had.

After several years of discussing a potential regional grouping, three sovereign states (Samoa, Tonga, and Tuvalu) and five self-governing but non-sovereign territories formally launched, in November 2011, the Polynesian Leaders Group, intended to cooperate on a variety of issues including culture and language, education, responses to climate change, and trade and investment. It does not, however, constitute a political or monetary union.

== Navigation ==
Polynesia consists of islands diffused throughout a triangular area with sides of four thousand miles. The area from the Hawaiian Islands in the north, to Easter Island in the east and to New Zealand in the south were all settled by Polynesians.

Navigators traveled to small inhabited islands using only their own senses and knowledge passed by oral tradition from navigator to apprentice. In order to locate directions at various times of day and year, navigators in Eastern Polynesia memorized important facts: the motion of specific stars, and where they would rise on the horizon of the ocean; weather; times of travel; wildlife species (which congregate at particular positions); directions of swells on the ocean, and how the crew would feel their motion; colors of the sea and sky, especially how clouds would cluster at the locations of some islands; and angles for approaching harbors.

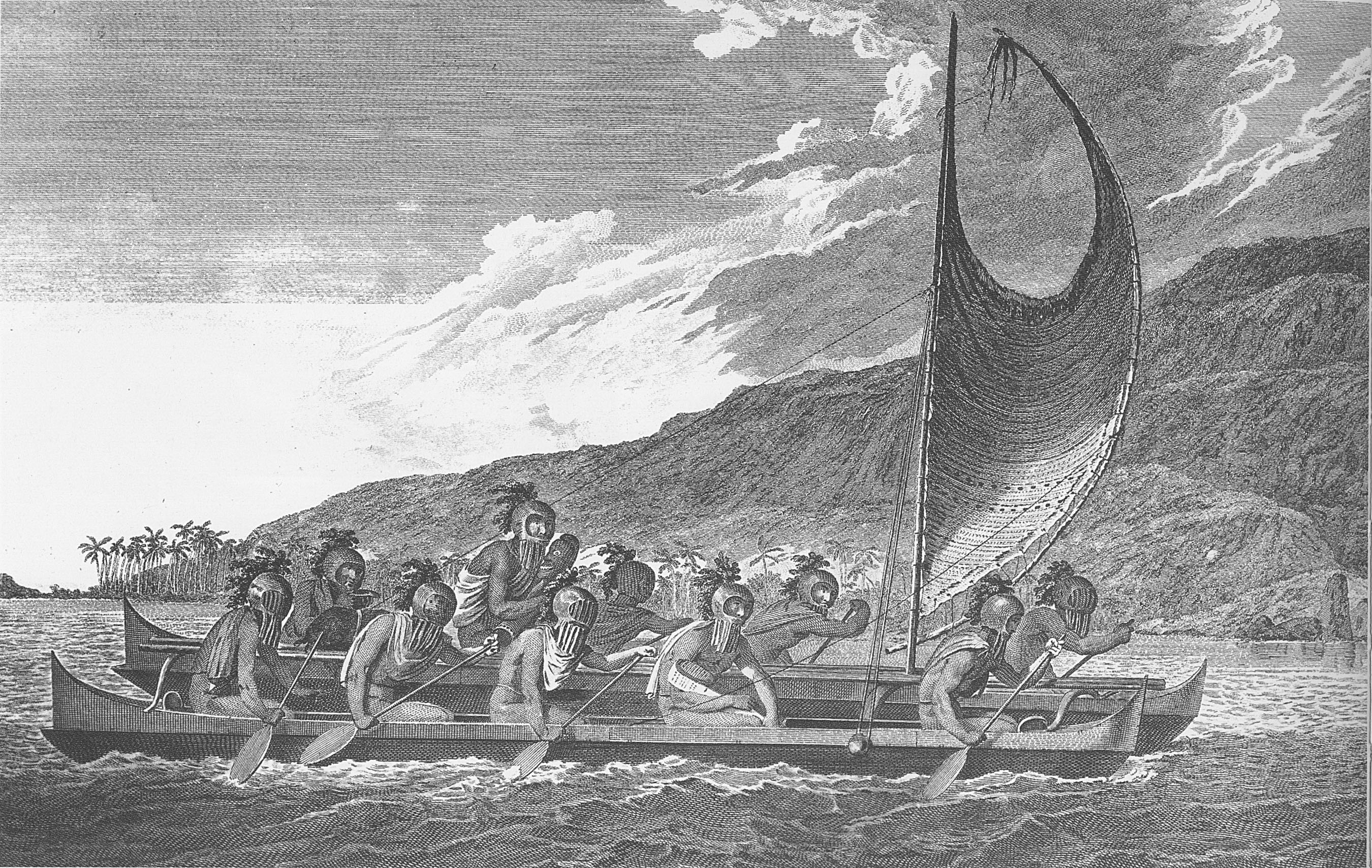
Polynesian (Hawaiian) navigators sailing multi-hulled canoe, c. 1781

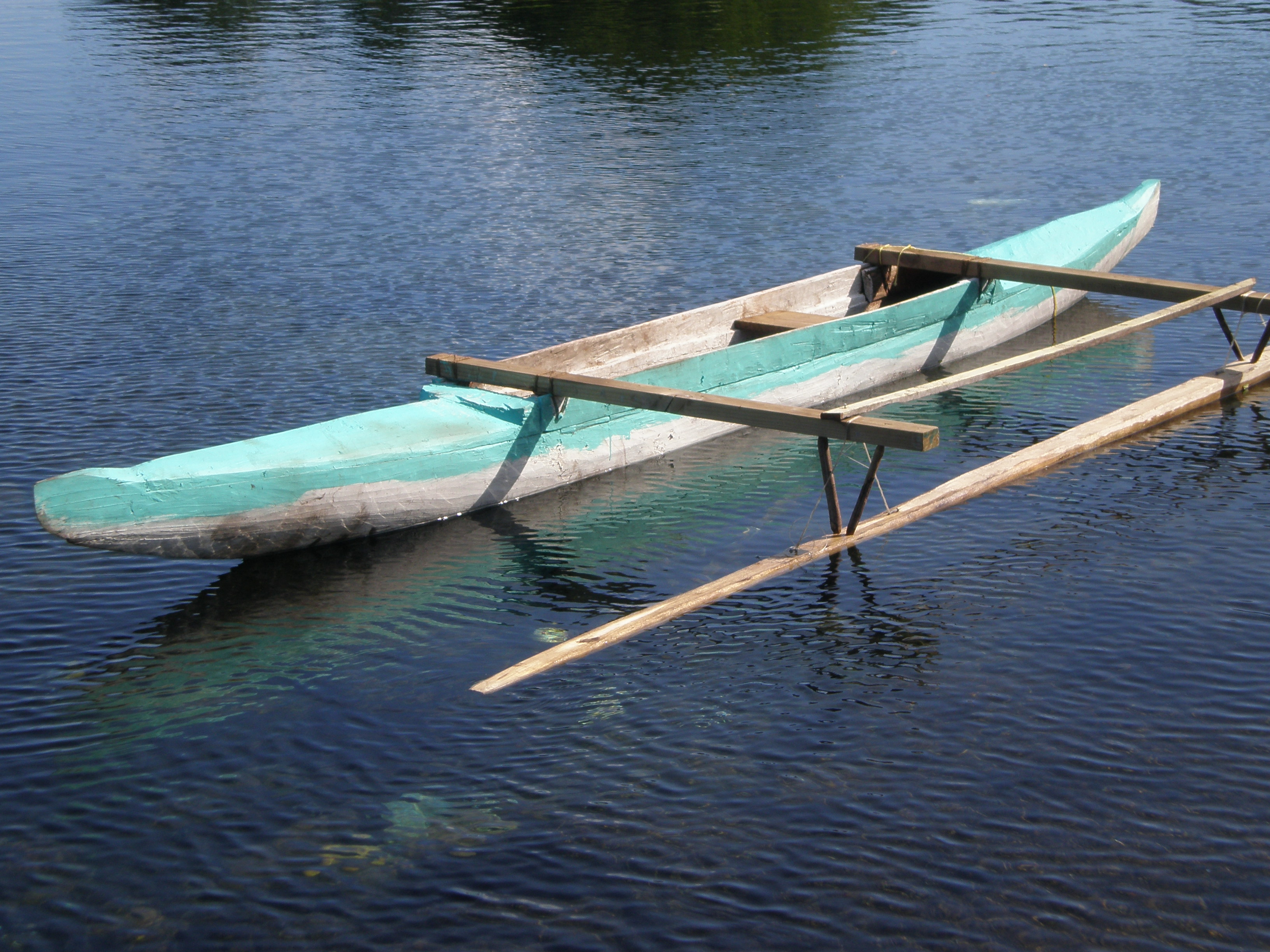
A common fishing canoe va'a with outrigger in Savaiʻi island, Samoa, 2009

These wayfinding techniques, along with outrigger canoe construction methods, were kept as guild secrets. Generally, each island maintained a guild of navigators who had very high status; in times of famine or difficulty these navigators could trade for aid or evacuate people to neighboring islands. On his first voyage of Pacific exploration Cook had the services of a Polynesian navigator, Tupaia, who drew a hand-drawn chart of the islands within 3,200 km (2,000 mi) radius (to the north and west) of his home island of Ra'iatea. Tupaia had knowledge of 130 islands and named 74 on his chart. Tupaia had navigated from Ra'iatea in short voyages to 13 islands. He had not visited western Polynesia, as since his grandfather's time the extent of voyaging by Raiateans has diminished to the islands of eastern Polynesia. His grandfather and father had passed to Tupaia the knowledge as to the location of the major islands of western Polynesia and the navigation information necessary to voyage to Samoa, Tonga and Melanesian island of Fiji. As the Admiralty orders directed Cook to search for the "Great Southern Continent", Cook ignored Tupaia's chart and his skills as a navigator. To this day, original traditional methods of Polynesian Navigation are still taught in the Polynesian outlier of Taumako Island in the Solomon Islands.

From a single chicken bone recovered from the archaeological site of El Arenal-1, on the Arauco Peninsula, Chile, a 2007 research report looking at radiocarbon dating and an ancient DNA sequence indicate that Polynesian navigators may have reached the Americas at least 100 years before Columbus (who arrived 1492 AD), introducing chickens to South America. A later report looking at the same specimens concluded:

A published, apparently pre-Columbian, Chilean specimen and six pre-European Polynesian specimens also cluster with the same European/Indian subcontinental/Southeast Asian sequences, providing no support for a Polynesian introduction of chickens to South America. In contrast, sequences from two archaeological sites on Easter Island group with an uncommon haplogroup from Indonesia, Japan, and China and may represent a genetic signature of an early Polynesian dispersal. Modeling of the potential marine carbon contribution to the Chilean archaeological specimen casts further doubt on claims for pre-Columbian chickens, and definitive proof will require further analyses of ancient DNA sequences and radiocarbon and stable isotope data from archaeological excavations within both Chile and Polynesia.

Knowledge of the traditional Polynesian methods of navigation was largely lost after contact with and colonization by Europeans. This left the problem of accounting for the presence of the Polynesians in such isolated and scattered parts of the Pacific. By the late 19th century to the early 20th century, a more generous view of Polynesian navigation had come into favor, perhaps creating a romantic picture of their canoes, seamanship and navigational expertise.

In the mid to late 1960s, scholars began testing sailing and paddling experiments related to Polynesian navigation: David Lewis sailed his catamaran from Tahiti to New Zealand using stellar navigation without instruments and Ben Finney built a 12-meter (40-foot) replica of a Hawaiian double canoe "Nalehia" and tested it in Hawaii. Meanwhile, Micronesian ethnographic research in the Caroline Islands revealed that traditional stellar navigational methods were still in everyday use. Recent re-creations of Polynesian voyaging, as done by the Honolulu-based Polynesian Voyaging Society, have used methods based largely on Micronesian methods and the teachings of Micronesian navigator Mau Piailug.

It is probable that the Polynesian navigators employed a whole range of techniques including use of the stars, the movement of ocean currents and wave patterns, the air and sea interference patterns caused by islands and atolls, the flight of birds, the winds and the weather. Scientists think that long-distance Polynesian voyaging followed the seasonal paths of birds. There are some references in their oral traditions to the flight of birds and some say that there were range marks onshore pointing to distant islands in line with these flyways. One theory is that they would have taken a frigatebird with them. These birds refuse to land on the water as their feathers will become waterlogged making it impossible to fly. When the voyagers thought they were close to land they may have released the bird, which would either fly towards land or else return to the canoe. It is likely that the Polynesians also used wave and swell formations to navigate. It is thought that the Polynesian navigators may have measured the time it took to sail between islands in "canoe-days" or a similar type of expression.

Another navigational technique may have involved following sea turtle migrations. While other navigational techniques may have been sufficient to reach known islands, some research finds only sea turtles could have helped Polynesian navigators reach new islands. Sea turtle migrations are feasible for canoes to follow, at shallow depths, slower speeds, and in large groups. This could explain how Polynesians were able to find and settle the majority of Pacific Islands.

Also, people of the Marshall Islands used special devices called stick charts, showing the places and directions of swells and wave-breaks, with tiny seashells affixed to them to mark the positions of islands along the way. Materials for these maps were readily available on beaches, and their making was simple; however, their effective use needed years and years of study.

== See also ==
- Films set in Polynesia
- Australasia
- Melanesia
- Micronesia
- Polynesian narrative
- Polynesian Society
- Polynesian Voyaging Society
- Polynesian outlier
- Polynesian navigation
