= Long pause =

A long pause may refer to:

- A long rest in music.
- A period of 1,000 years in Polynesian history in which no ocean voyaging took place.
