= Moana (franchise) =

Disney media franchise

- Franchise logo used since 2016
- Created by: Ron Clements; John Musker; Chris Williams; Don Hall; Pamela Ribon; Aaron Kandell; Jordan Kandell
- Developed by: Jared Bush
- Original work: Moana
- Owner: The Walt Disney Company
- Years: 2016–present

Films and television
- Films: Moana (2016); Moana 2 (2024); Moana (2026); Moana 3 (TBA)
- Short film: Gone Fishing (2017)

Audio
- Soundtracks: Moana (2016); Moana 2; Moana (2026)

Miscellaneous
- Theme park attraction: Journey of Water

Official website
- movies.disney.com/moana/

Moana (also known as Vaiana or Oceania in some markets) is a Disney media franchise that originally started in 2016 with the release of the American animated feature film Moana, produced by Walt Disney Animation Studios, and released by Walt Disney Studios Motion Pictures.

The franchise consists of two animated films, Moana (2016) and its sequel Moana 2 (2024), as well as a live-action remake adaptation of the 2016 film, which released in 2026.

== Films ==
| Film | Release date | Director(s) | Screenwriter(s) | Story | Producer(s) |
Animated
| Moana | November 23, 2016 | John Musker & Ron Clements Co-Directors; Chris Williams & Don Hall | Jared Bush | Ron Clements, John Musker, Chris Williams, Don Hall, Pamela Ribon, Aaron Kandell, & Jordan Kandell | Osnat Shurer |
| Moana 2 | November 27, 2024 | Jason Hand, Dana Ledoux Miller & David Derrick Jr. | Jared Bush & Dana Ledoux Miller | Jared Bush, Dana Ledoux Miller & Bek Smith | Yvett Merino & Christina Chen |
Live-action
| Moana | July 10, 2026 | Thomas Kail | Jared Bush & Dana Ledoux Miller | Jared Bush & Dana Ledoux Miller | Dwayne Johnson, Dany Garcia, Beau Flynn, Hiram Garcia & Lin-Manuel Miranda |

=== Animated ===
==== Moana (2016) ====
After directing The Princess and the Frog (2009), Clements and Musker started working on an adaptation of Terry Pratchett's Mort, but problems with acquiring the necessary film rights prevented them from continuing with that project. To avoid a recurrence of that issue, they pitched three original ideas. The genesis of one of those ideas (the one that was ultimately green-lit) occurred in 2011, when Musker began reading up on Polynesian mythology, and learned of the heroic exploits of the demigod Māui. Intrigued with the rich culture of Polynesia, he felt it would be a suitable subject for an animated film. Shortly thereafter, Musker and Clements wrote a treatment and pitched it to John Lasseter, who recommended that both of them should go on research trips. Accordingly, in 2012, Clements and Musker went on research trips to Fiji, Samoa, and Tahiti to meet the people of the South Pacific Ocean and learn about their culture. At first, they had planned to make the film entirely about Maui, but their initial research trips inspired Clements to pitch a new idea focused on the young daughter of a chief.

Clements and Musker were fascinated to learn during their research that the people of Polynesia abruptly stopped making long-distance voyages about three thousand years ago. Polynesian navigational traditions had long predated those of European explorers, beginning around 300 CE. Native people of the Pacific possessed knowledge of the world and their place in it prior to the incursion of foreigners. For example, Kānaka Maoli (Native Hawaiians) were well aware of the existence of far away islands, had names for these places, and were interested in exploring them to benefit their societies. This voyaging heritage was made possible by a geographical knowledge system based on individual perspective rather than the European cardinal direction system. The reasons for the halt of this voyaging tradition remain unknown, but scholars have offered climate change and resulting shifts in ocean currents and wind patterns as one possible explanation. Native peoples of the Pacific resumed voyaging again a thousand years later. Clements and Musker set the film at that point in time, about two thousand years ago, on a fictional island in the central Pacific Ocean, which drew inspiration from elements of the real-life island nations of Fiji, Samoa, and Tonga, although Motunui is actually a real islet located south of Easter Island in Chilean Polynesia.

Over the five years it took to develop and produce the film, Clements and Musker recruited experts from across the South Pacific to form an Oceanic Story Trust, who consulted on the film's cultural accuracy and sensitivity as the story evolved through nine versions. The Trust responded negatively, for example, to a depiction of Maui as bald, and to a proposed scene in which Moana threw a tantrum by throwing coconuts. In response, Maui was reworked with long hair and the coconut scene was scrapped.

During the 2015 D23 Expo's panel for Disney's slate of upcoming animated films, Moana's last name was given as "Waialiki", but that name was not retained in the final film.

==== Moana 2 (2024) ====
In December 2020, during a Disney Investor Day meeting, Walt Disney Animation Studios chief creative officer Jennifer Lee announced that a musical series titled Moana: The Series, based on the 2016 film of the same name, was in development at the studio for Disney+. By August 2021, it was reported that Osnat Shurer would once again serve as producer. In January 2022, it was announced that David Derrick Jr. would serve as the writer and director, after filling the role of storyboard artist of the first film. The series entered development simultaneously with the live action remake of Moana according to Jared Bush, a writer of the film and screenplay writer of the 2016 animated film.

In February 2024, Disney CEO Bob Iger announced that the series had been reworked into a theatrical sequel titled Moana 2, with Derrick and Shurer remaining attached to the project. By the release of the first trailer in May, Jason Hand and Dana Ledoux Miller were confirmed as co-directors alongside Derrick, while Christina Chen and Yvett Merino were revealed to replace Shurer as the film's producers.

==== Moana 3 (TBA) ====
On July 2, 2026, eight days before the release of the live-action film, Johnson confirmed that a third animated film in the Moana franchise was in the works. He also confirmed that Jared Bush and Dana Ledoux Miller would return to write the script.

=== Live-action ===
==== Moana (2026) ====
In April 2023, The Hollywood Reporter reported that Walt Disney Pictures was developing a live-action adaptation of Moana to be produced by Johnson, Dany Garcia, and Hiram Garcia, under their production company Seven Bucks Productions, and Beau Flynn of Flynn Pictures Co., executive produced by Auliʻi Cravalho and Scott Sheldon, and written by Jared Bush, with Johnson set to reprise his role as Maui. On June 12, 2024, Catherine Laga'aia was announced as the titular character.

The film was originally scheduled for theatrical release in the United States on June 27, 2025; however, it was delayed to July 10, 2026, due to the release of Moana 2 for the previous year. A teaser trailer for the film was released on November 17, 2025.

== Short film ==
=== Gone Fishing (2017) ===
Maui Mini Movie: Gone Fishing was released along with the first film's Blu-ray and digital release. It follows Maui trying and failing to fish until Moana shows him how it's done.

== Cast and characters ==
List indicators

This section includes characters who will appear or have appeared in the franchise.

- An empty grey cell indicates the character was not in the film, or that the character's official presence has not yet been confirmed.
- ^{V} indicates a voice-only role.
- ^{Y} indicates a younger version of the character.
- ^{S} indicates an appearance as a character's singing voice.

| Characters | Animated films | | Short film | Live-action film |
| Characters | Moana | Moana 2 | Gone Fishing | Moana |
| Characters | 2016 | 2024 | 2017 | 2026 |
|---|---|---|---|---|
| Moana | Auli'i Cravalho Louise Bush^{Y} | Auli'i Cravalho | Auli'i Cravalho | Catherine Laga'aia Amaya Masoli^{Y} Emma Puahi-Shapazian^{Y} |
| Maui | Dwayne Johnson | Dwayne Johnson | Dwayne Johnson | Dwayne Johnson |
| Gramma Tala | Rachel House | Rachel House | | Rena Owen |
| Chief Tui | Temuera Morrison Christopher Jackson^{S} | Temuera Morrison | | John Tui |
| Sina | Nicole Scherzinger | Nicole Scherzinger | | Frankie Adams |
| Heihei | Alan Tudyk | Alan Tudyk | | Animal sounds only |
| Tamatoa | Jemaine Clement | Jemaine Clement | | Jemaine Clement^{V} |
| Tautai Vasa | Opetaia Foa'i^{S} | Gerald Ramsey Opetaia Foa'i^{S} | | Uncredited role |
| Fisherman | Oscar Kightley | | | |
| Villager No. 1 | Troy Polamalu | | | |
| Villager No. 2 | Puanani Cravalho | | | |
| Villager No. 3 | Alan Tudyk | | | |
| Simea | | Khaleesi Lambert-Tsuda | | |
| Moni | | Hualālai Chung | | |
| Loto | | Rose Matafeo | | |
| Kele | | David Fane | | |
| Matangi | | Awhimai Fraser | | |
| Nalo | | Tofiga Fepulea'i | | |
| Moanabes | | Tiana & Jasmine Johnson | | |

== Crew ==
| Role | Animated films | | Live-action film |
| Role | Moana | Moana 2 | Moana |
|---|---|---|---|
| Director(s) | John Musker; Ron Clements Co-Directors: Chris Williams; Don Hall | Jason Hand; Dana Ledoux Miller; David Derrick Jr. | Thomas Kail |
| Producer(s) | Osnat Shurer | Yvett Merino; Christina Chen | Dwayne Johnson; Dany Garcia; Beau Flynn; Hiram Garcia; Lin-Manuel Miranda |
| Writer(s) | Screenplay by: Jared Bush Story by: Ron Clements; John Musker; Chris Williams; Don Hall; Pamela Ribon; Aaron Kandell; Jordan Kandell | Screenplay by: Jared Bush; Dana Ledoux Miller Story by: Jared Bush; Dana Ledoux Miller; Bek Smith | Jared Bush; Dana Ledoux Miller |
| Executive Producer(s) | John Lasseter | Jennifer Lee; Jared Bush; Dwayne Johnson | Thomas Kail; Scott Sheldon; Charles Newirth; Auliʻi Cravalho |
| Composer | Mark Mancina | Mark Mancina | Mark Mancina |
| Songwriters | Lin-Manuel Miranda; Opetaia Foaʻi; Mark Mancina | Abigail Barlow; Emily Bear; Opetaia Foaʻi; Mark Mancina | Lin-Manuel Miranda; Opetaia Foaʻi; Mark Mancina |
| Editor(s) | Jeff Draheim | Jeremy Milton; Michael Louis Hill | Melanie Ann Oliver |
| Studio(s) | Walt Disney Pictures; Walt Disney Animation Studios | Walt Disney Pictures; Walt Disney Animation Studios | Walt Disney Pictures; Seven Bucks Productions; Flynn Picture Co. |
| Distributor | Walt Disney Studios Motion Pictures | Walt Disney Studios Motion Pictures | Walt Disney Studios Motion Pictures |
| Runtime | 1hr 47 min | 1hr 40 min | 1hr 55 min |

== Reception ==
=== Box office performance ===
| Film | U.S. release date | Box office gross | | | All-time ranking | | Budget | Ref. |
| Film | U.S. release date | U.S. and Canada | Other territories | Worldwide | U.S. and Canada | Worldwide | Budget | Ref. |
Animated films
| Moana | November 23, 2016 | $248,757,044 | $394,574,067 | $643,331,111 | 155 | 171 | $150 million | |
| Moana 2 | November 27, 2024 | $460,352,256 | $598,463,382 | $1,058,815,638 | 28 | 46 | $150 million | |
| Animated series | | $709,109,300 | $993,037,449 | $1,702,146,749 | | | $300,000,000 | |
Live-action remake
| Moana | July 10, 2026 | $126,061,370 | $182,450,000 | $308,511,370 | | | $250 million | |
| Total | | $835,170,670 | $1,175,487,449 | $2,010,658,119 | | | $550,000,000 | |

=== Critical and public response ===
| Film | Critical | | Public | |
| Film | Rotten Tomatoes | Metacritic | CinemaScore | PostTrak |
Animated films
| Moana | 95% (288 reviews) | 81 (44 reviews) | A | |
| Moana 2 | 61% (245 reviews) | 58 (50 reviews) | A− | |
Live-action remake
| Moana | 32% (177 reviews) | 42 (40 reviews) | A− | |

=== Accolades ===
| Award | Category | Moana | Moana 2 |
|---|---|---|---|
| Academy Awards | Best Animated Feature | Nominated | |
| Golden Globe Awards | Best Animated Feature | Nominated | Nominated |
| Annie Awards | Best Animated Feature | Nominated | Nominated |
| Kids' Choice Awards | Favorite Animated Movie | Nominated | Nominated |

Moana have received many nominations and awards, the majority for Best Animated Feature category and for Auliʻi Cravalho’s performance. At the 44th Annie Awards, Moana received six nominations and won two including Outstanding Achievement, Animated Effects in an Animated Production and Outstanding Achievement for Voice Acting in an Animated Feature Production. Also Lin-Manuel Miranda won a Grammy Award for Best Song Written for Visual Media for "How Far I'll Go", performed by Auliʻi Cravalho.

== Music ==
=== Soundtracks ===
| Title | U.S. release date | Length | Composer(s) | Label |
Animated series
| Moana (Original Motion Picture Soundtrack) | November 19, 2016 | 69:40 | Lin-Manuel Miranda; Opetaia Foaʻi; Mark Mancina | Walt Disney Records |
| Moana 2 (Original Motion Picture Soundtrack) | November 22, 2024 | 32:38 (standard); 110:08 (deluxe) | Abigail Barlow; Emily Bear; Opetaia Foaʻi; Mark Mancina | Walt Disney Records |
Live-action remake
| Moana (Original Motion Picture Soundtrack) | June 26, 2026 | 30:02 | Lin-Manuel Miranda; Opetaia Foaʻi; Mark Mancina | Walt Disney Records |

=== Singles ===
==== Moana (2016) ====
- “How Far I'll Go” (Alessia Cara version)
- “You're Welcome” (Dwayne Johnson version)
- “You're Welcome” (Jordan Fisher version)

==== Moana 2 (2024) ====
- “Beyond” (End Credit Version)

==== Moana (2026) ====
- “Along the Way” (by Auliʻi Cravalho, Catherine Laga'aia & Dwayne Johnson)

== Theme parks ==
Moana appears as a meet-and-greet character at Disney Parks.

=== Journey of Water ===
Journey of Water, Inspired by Moana is a walkthrough water trail attraction, which depicts the Earth's water cycle, opened at Epcot on October 16, 2023.

=== Upcoming Moana attraction ===
On April 28, 2025, the Oriental Land Company announced that Western River Railroad, Swiss Family Treehouse, Jungle Cruise: Wildlife Expeditions and The Enchanted Tiki Room: Stitch Presents Aloha e Komo Mai! will be closing and replaced with a new The Incredibles, Up and Moana attraction in the section of Adventureland at Tokyo Disneyland.

== In other media ==
Moana and Heihei make guest appearances in the 2018 film Ralph Breaks the Internet. Moana appears as one of the main characters in the 2023 special Lego Disney Princess: The Castle Quest, as well as its sequel Lego Disney Princess: Villains Unite. The characters of the first film have cameo appearances in the 2023 short film Once Upon a Studio.

The franchise's titular protagonist, Moana, is part of the characters in the Disney Princess franchise. The antagonists of the 2016 film, Tamatoa and the Kakamora, have been included as part of the Disney Villains franchise.

== Lawsuit ==
On January 10, 2025, Buck Woodall filed a lawsuit against the Walt Disney Company for the alleged reasons of stealing the ideas of the first Moana movie and the second, asking for a sum of $17 billion. The lawsuit ruled in Disney's favor on March 10, 2025.
