= Maui (Moana) =

Fictional character from Disney's Moana

- Moana character
- Maui, as depicted in Moana (2016)
- First appearance: Moana (2016)
- Created by: Ron Clements; John Musker
- Based on: Māui
- Voiced by: Dwayne Johnson; Jess Harnell (Disney Dreamlight Valley and Disney Speedstorm)
- Portrayed by: Dwayne Johnson (2026 film)

In-universe information
- Species: Demigod
- Titles: Shapeshifter; Demigod of the Wind and Sea; Hero of Men and Women/Everyone
- Weapon: Fish hook
- Nationality: Polynesian

Maui (/maʊwiː/) is a fictional character that appears in the 2016 Walt Disney Animation Studios animated film Moana. He was created by directors Ron Clements and John Musker and is voiced by American actor Dwayne Johnson. Maui is loosely based on the mythological figure Māui in Polynesian mythology. He is characterized as a demigod, trickster and shapeshifter and is distinguishable by his bulky tattooed body, thick, flowing hair and magical fish hook that allows him to shapeshift into various creatures. Maui's tattoos recount his deeds and feature an animated miniature version of himself that pokes fun at his overinflated ego. The character returns in the sequel film Moana 2, which premiered in November of 2024. Johnson also portrays Maui in the 2026 live-action remake of Moana.

In Moana, the title character Moana (Auliʻi Cravalho) sets sail to seek Maui in order to save her island from ecological disaster. She convinces him to accompany her on her voyage to recover his magical fish hook and restore the heart stone that he stole from the goddess Te Fiti. The story concept was inspired by various myths about Māui from across Polynesia, which Clements and Musker incorporated to create an original character.

Disney's version of the mythological figure has faced criticism from prominent Polynesians for cultural insensitivities, but has been positively received by critics who praised the charm and charisma of Johnson's performance, including for his vocals in the song "You're Welcome", which was written by American songwriter Lin-Manuel Miranda. Johnson has also received several award nominations and won a Teen Choice Award for voicing the character.

== Concept and creation ==
=== Story concept and writing ===
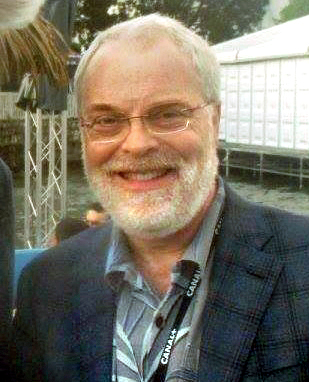
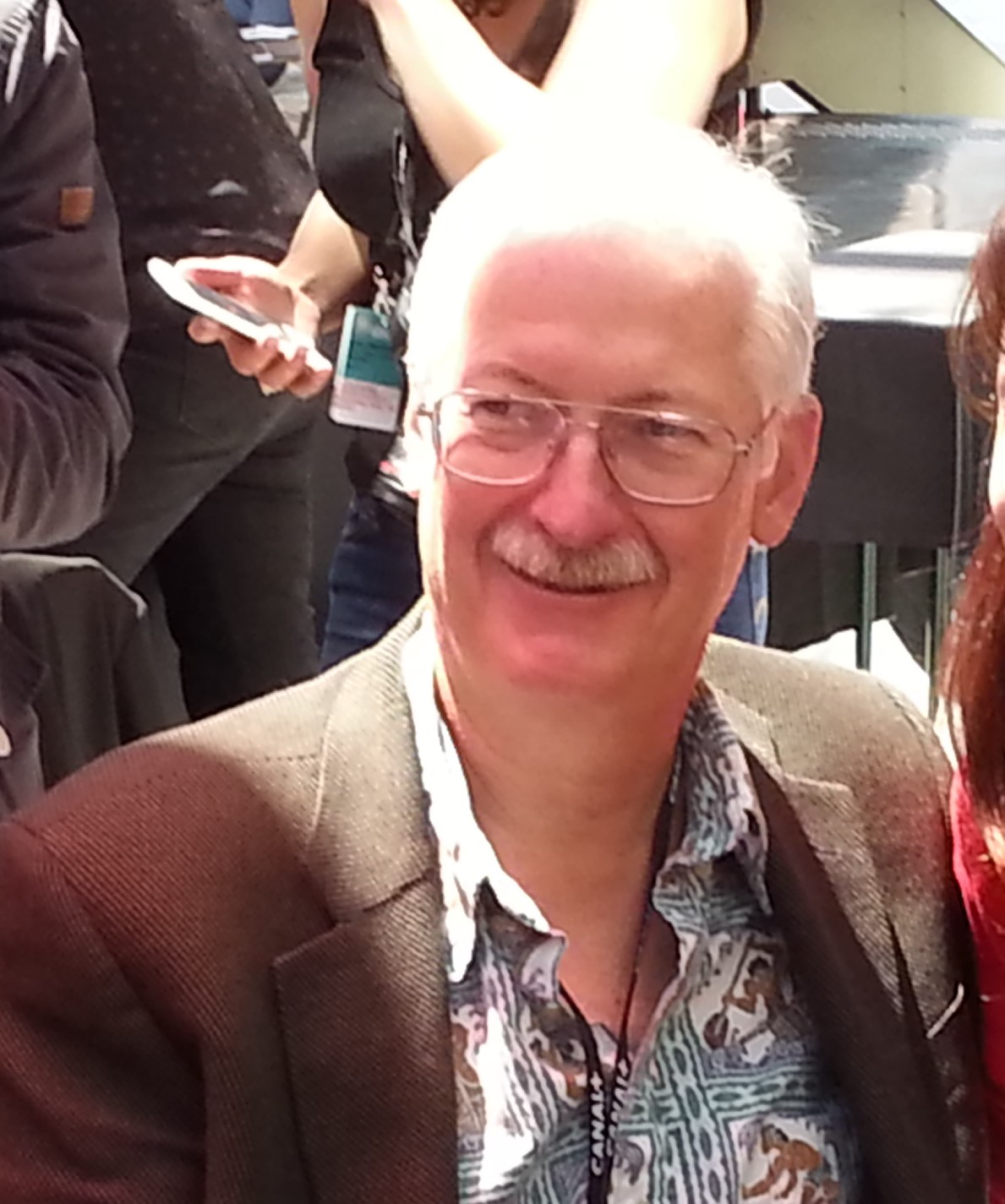
Directors Ron Clements (left) and John Musker (right) took inspiration from Māui in Polynesian mythology to create an original character and story concept.

In 2011, director John Musker started reading about Polynesian mythology and decided that Māui was an ideal focus for an animated story. Ron Clements said that Māui was the inspiration for the film, being a mythic demigod and larger than life figure who is found in many cultures of the South Pacific in different variations and therefore seemed like the perfect focal character. Their early story concept was based on a myth and involved a supporting female character enlisting the help of Maui to help her save her kidnapped lover. Musker and Clements wrote and pitched the story concept to Disney animation chief John Lasseter, who asked them to conduct research in Polynesia for the project to progress.

Although Musker and Clements originally intended Maui to be the film's protagonist, they were inspired by the "beautiful, powerful women in Polynesia" and decided to instead focus the story on the daughter of a chief. Influenced by their research trips to Fiji, Tahiti, and Samoa, they devised a new story concept that focused on the Polynesian tradition of navigation, particularly a 1,000-year period when the people did not sail, and made it a teenage girl's coming-of-age story. They imagined the story to be similar to True Grit involving "a determined young girl who teamed with a down-on-his-luck trickster". During development of the character, Musker and Clements read myths about Maui and his various depictions, which sometimes portray him as a heroic character and sometimes as a trickster. They wanted to create a character that is flawed but likeable. The story evolved during the development process, abandoning some ideas such as Moana being a fan of Maui. The initial draft of the script was written by Taika Waititi, who had been brought in because Musker and Clements wanted someone from Polynesian culture to write it. The draft was written over several months, after which Waititi returned to New Zealand to direct What We Do in the Shadows. He later joked that little of his original script remained in the final film. Aaron and Jordan Kandell were two of the five screenwriters on the project and developed various aspects of the story, including the relationship between Maui and Moana. Jared Bush and Pamela Ribon also worked on producing the script. Bush said that during the process the writing team did their best to work around cliches but had to tear apart the script several times and start again.

Maui's song "You're Welcome" was originally intended to be sung by Moana upon first meeting Maui. Musker explained that in an early draft Moana idolized Maui, so she sang a song to motivate him into action by reminding him of his many great feats. The song was later transferred to Maui once his egotistical personality had been conceived. The ending of Moana went through many revisions before reaching the final version. In a previous ending, Moana and Maui teamed up to fight the lava monster Te Ka, with Maui mainly being the character who defeated her. Bush said this was changed because Moana needed to be the star of the final act: "We really wanted to get Maui out of the way for that moment".

=== Character design ===
Musker and Clements began making trips to Polynesia in 2011. This led to the establishment of a group named the Oceanic Trust that was formed of cultural advisors from various islands such as Samoa, Tahiti, Mo'orea, and Fiji. The trust provided detailed feedback at all levels of the film's development and shaped Maui's final design. Early character art depicted Maui with a shorter stature and a bald head but this was abandoned following feedback from the trust, which resulted in a broader frame and thick, flowing hair. Upon seeing the original sketch, Tahitian cultural practitioner Hinano Murphy advised that it was important for Maui to have hair because this was his mana, his power as a demigod. Maui's full head of hair was initially considered to be a technical challenge, but the bald design was abandoned. Character art director Bill Schwab wanted to push his design creatively to make him "both funny and powerful simultaneously", while also balancing the contrasting proportions of Maui's and Moana's sizes. To ensure authenticity in Maui's design, the designers conducted research into Polynesian designs, including materials, patterns, and dyes used in clothing and tattoo designs. Maui's tattoos were created following a careful study of the tattoos of Samoan chiefs. Clements said that the tattoos recount Maui's life by depicting his great deeds and victories. When development artist Sue Nichols created drawings of Maui's tattoos coming to life, Musker and Clements thought it was a great idea to exploit the animation by giving Maui animated tattoos. They visualized Maui as a demigod with matching superhero proportions who would be capable of pulling islands from the sea and battling monsters so they designed him as a strong, larger than life caricature: "a big, solid man-mountain kind of a guy". His magical fish hook was inscribed with intricate detail to give the impression of recounting his exploits going back thousands of years.

=== Animation ===
Animator Eric Goldberg, who previously worked on Aladdin and Hercules, led the animation for Moana. Two dimensional hand-drawn animation was integrated into the 3D animation to depict Maui's past achievements in the tattoos that cover his body. An animated miniature tattoo version of Maui brought the character's conscience to life. The Mini Maui tattoo figure was created by Goldberg making hand-drawn sketches on paper in the traditional Polynesian tattoo style. The 2D animation and 3D animation were then created separately before being integrated. Musker explained that Mini Maui's sentience emerged during the creative process as a figure that could poke fun at Maui's egotistical personality. He felt it was important that the character's emotions were expressed despite being a graphic character. The process of combining the hand animated Mini Maui and the 3D animated Maui proved difficult but was solved by superimposing the drawings of Mini Maui onto the computer generated Maui to ensure they interacted correctly.

=== Voice ===
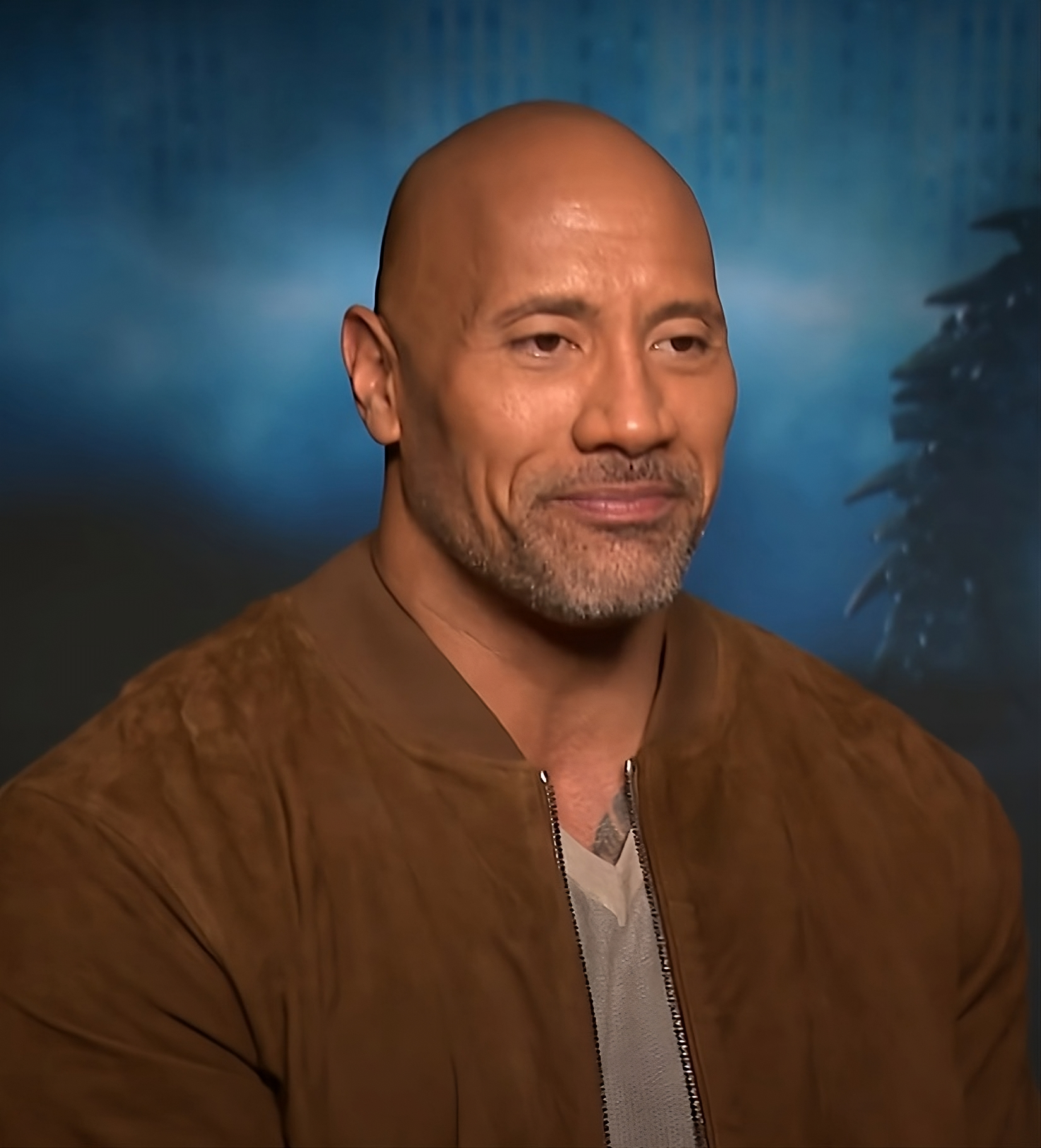
Maui is voiced by Dwayne Johnson in the English version of Moana, and also physically portrays the character in the live-action remake.

On December 2, 2014, it was announced that Dwayne Johnson was in talks to voice Maui, and was excited to be cast. Musker said that although the character of Maui was conceived before considering Johnson in the role, he was suggested early on in the process by a contact on their first research trip. He and Clements were aware of Johnson's connection to Polynesia and felt that he physically resembled a demigod, therefore no other actors were auditioned for the role. Jared Bush began to write Johnson's personality into the character, transforming Maui into a more likeable character than earlier more negative versions. Lin-Manuel Miranda felt that it would be difficult to make Maui's song "You're Welcome" a success without Johnson's "instant likeability". When preparing to write Maui's song, Miranda said that he watched YouTube videos of Johnson's past career in WWE to write for his vocal range. Performing Maui's song pushed Johnson out of his comfort zone. He relied on Miranda for voice coaching through 20-minute sessions on Skype until he was comfortable with his vocal abilities. Miranda sent him a recording of the track so that Johnson could play the song repeatedly and encouraged him to add his own personality into the performance. According to Johnson, Maui was based on his grandfather, Peter Maivia, a wrestler and Samoan high chief who had tattoos covering his body. Being of Polynesian descent, Johnson said that the film was an opportunity to showcase Polynesian culture in film. His personality was infused into Maui's animation by shooting his facial expressions on camera as he was voicing the character.

== Depiction of Maui ==
Disney's character is based on the Polynesian demigod Māui, a mythical character whose story varies across the Pacific Islands. While Disney's Maui is presented as an orphan, this diverges from traditional Polynesian stories in which Māui has four brothers. "The Māui Myths", which recount his stories by Māori natives of Tolaga Bay in the North Island of New Zealand, describe the accomplishments of Māui, such as crediting him with using his magical fish hook to pull up islands from the Pacific Ocean and snaring the sun to slow it down. These accomplishments are highlighted in the lyrics of Maui's song "You're Welcome", which was written by Lin-Manuel Miranda.

Musker admitted that he had never heard of Māui until he stumbled upon him in Polynesian mythology, but thought that made him more appealing because he realized that nobody had done anything with him in film. He was struck by his potential as a character due to his larger-than-life traits and his "superpowers" as a shape-shifter and trickster. He was drawn to the tales of Māui's deeds in Polynesian mythology, noting that he is pan-Pacific rather than being from one specific culture. He and Clements were advised to not base Maui on one particular culture as there were varying myths that evolved on different islands. They therefore decided to use parts from different myths and marry them together in the story. Clements said that while in some myths he is a straight character, in others he is a trickster, but they chose the mischievous version for the film because he appeared to be a more entertaining character.

Clements explained that in Moana, Maui is a fallen hero that Moana must restore to his former greatness, although initially she does not trust him. Musker described Maui's tattoos as a "a walking billboard of all his exploits" allowing him to recount his deeds simply by turning his body and showing his back. The Mini Maui tattoo figure acts as his conscience and sidekick. Clements explained that he has a relationship with Maui and, although he does not speak, provides storytelling and humour.

== Appearances ==
=== Film ===
==== Moana (2016) ====
In Moana, Maui is a legendary trickster who stole the heart stone of the goddess Te Fiti. He owns a magical fish hook that allows him to shapeshift into different animals, but manages to lose it. When a young girl named Moana discovers that her island is facing an ecological disaster, she defies her father by sailing beyond the reef. She finds the vain demigod Maui and convinces him to accompany her on her sea voyage so that they can recover his fish hook and restore the heart of Te Fiti. Moana initially finds Maui to be self-centered and egotistical, but over time they develop a mutual bond. He teaches her to navigate the ocean and protects her from dangers. When they reach the island of Te Fiti, they are confronted by the lava demon Te Ka and in the battle Maui's magical fish hook is broken, which causes him to lose hope. Having found her courage, Moana returns to the island and successfully restores the heart of Te Fiti, which causes the goddess to return and bring renewed life to the surrounding islands. As a reward, she restores Maui's fish hook and his powers.

==== Once Upon a Studio (2023) ====
Maui appears alongside other Disney characters in the 2023 short film Once Upon a Studio, in which Dwayne Johnson reprises his role.

==== Moana 2 (2024) ====
In February 2024, it was announced that an animated sequel, Moana 2, would be released in November 2024. A television series was in development until CEO Bob Iger decided upon a feature film after being impressed by the footage. The film's plot involves a new voyage for Moana and Maui and a crew of seafarers in which Moana makes a journey to Oceania. On February 8, 2024, Deadline reported that Johnson was in talks to reprise his role as the voice of Maui in the animated sequel.

==== Moana (2026) ====
In April 2023, The Hollywood Reporter reported that Walt Disney Pictures was developing a live-action adaptation of Moana, with Dwayne Johnson set to reprise his role as Maui along with a new supporting cast. On the announcement, Johnson remarked that he was "deeply humbled and overcome with gratitude" to develop a live-action Moana and that he was inspired by his grandfather, Peter Maivia. The film was originally set for release in June 2025 but was delayed by 13 months, with a scheduled release date of July 10, 2026.

=== Video games ===
==== Disney Dreamlight Valley ====
Maui is one of several characters that can be unlocked in the life simulation game Disney Dreamlight Valley. Veteran voice actor Jess Harnell replaces Johnson in the voice role for this game.

=== Theme parks ===
In June 2017, Maui made a debut appearance alongside Moana in a stage show at Shanghai Disneyland. In 2020, Maui made appearances as one of the characters in the "Magic Happens" Disney Parade at Disneyland Resort.

== Merchandise ==
In June 2023, Maui was revealed as one of the characters in the collectible card game Disney Lorcana. He has appeared in the form of toys and dolls, including as a Lego big figure as part of the Disney Moana lego sets named "Moana's Island Adventure" and "Moana's Ocean Voyage".

== Reception ==
=== Controversy ===
The Guardian reported that Disney's portrayal of Maui was met with criticism in the Pacific islands for depicting a negative stereotype of the demigod as an obese character and an unhealthy stereotype of Polynesian men. New Zealand politician Jenny Salesa shared an image on Facebook that described Disney's Maui as "half pig, half hippo" and considered it an unacceptable negative stereotype of Maui. Samoan rugby player Eliota Fuimaono-Sapolu echoed this by writing that Maui looked like he "fished up the Islands, he deep fried em and ate em". The Washington Post reported that the film had been criticized by several prominent Polynesians largely for failing to portray Maui as a serious, powerful character and a significant cultural figure, while instead choosing to represent him as a frivolous comic relief character. Disney received further criticism in September 2016 over a Maui costume consisting of a tattooed body stocking, which was pulled from the Disney store after accusations of brownface. In a BBC critique, Arieta Tegeilolo Talanoa Tora Rika commented that for many people of the Pacific, Māui is "a hero, ancestor, demi-God and a spiritual guide" and felt that it was disrespectful to make money from such a significant aspect of Polynesian culture. Producer Osnat Shurer responded by saying that the production team had spent five years working with Polynesian advisors to create a beautiful representation and that the film was produced "with love and respect". She explained that while conducting research on Māui, it was apparent that different islands had different ideas about him, but in all versions he was larger than life, thus the animators ensured he was big and strong.

=== Critical reception ===
Justin Chang of the Los Angeles Times called Maui a "boisterous agent of show-stopping supernatural chaos" and opined that while opposition to him for being a stereotype of over-sized Polynesian males was valid, it failed to recognize the comedy in Johnson's performance. The New Zealand Herald dismissed the backlash to the character and described him as "a bouncing ball of fun". Ben Child writing for The Guardian thought that it was unsurprising that Disney had moved away from the mythological figure as his exploits seemed inappropriate for a Disney animation. He thought that Disney's Maui appeared to be more powerful than obese and had a "remarkable sense of dexterity and elastic grace" despite his large size.

Eric Kohn of IndieWire praised the "enlightened" casting of Johnson and the underlying joke that Maui's macho image as an invincible hero deteriorates once Moana realizes that she cannot rely on him. Christy Lemire writing for RogerEbert.com praised the charm and charisma of Johnson's performance and commented that the film also allowed him to showcase his abilities within its dramatic and intimate moments. In his Empire review, Nick de Semlyen thought that Johnson singing "You're Welcome" was "an ode to egotism that is simultaneously a perfect storm of delightfulness". Christopher Orr writing for The Atlantic considered Johnson's performance as Maui to be "charming" and "witty", describing it as the most joyous part of the film. Jake Wilson of The Sydney Morning Herald described Maui as "the film's key triumph" and likened him to an older brother who is bigger but not smarter. Den of Geek writer David Crow enjoyed the rapport between Cravalho and Johnson. He also opined that Johnson "exudes the kind of charisma not seen by animated Disney characters since the days of Robin Williams and Eddie Murphy".

By contrast, Tim Grierson of Screen International felt that the awkward relationship between Moana and Maui is more jokey than funny and, despite commenting that Johnson's arrogance is amusing, he thought that Maui's annoyance at Moana's assertiveness creates "hit-or-miss comedic returns". ScreenCrush writer Britt Hayes criticized the film for the incessant arguing between Moana and Maui. She further described Maui as "narcissistic" and "an obnoxious character who lacks any semblance of humility". Vadim Rizov writing for Sight and Sound magazine highlighted that the moment in which Maui dismisses Moana and declares "If you have a dress and an animal sidekick, you're a princess" acts as a self-reflective nod to Disney's past "retrograde formula".

=== Accolades ===
Johnson's Maui received nominations at the 2017 Nickelodeon Kids' Choice Awards, including Favorite Voice From An Animated Movie and Favorite Frenemies alongside Auliʻi Cravalho. Johnson was nominated at the 48th NAACP Image Awards in 2017 for Character Voiceover. He was also nominated for Outstanding Voice Performance at the Black Reel Awards of 2017. At the 2017 Teen Choice Awards he won the Choice Fantasy Movie Actor category for Moana.
