= Moana (2026 film) =

2026 film by Thomas Kail

- Theatrical release poster
- Directed by: Thomas Kail
- Screenplay by: Jared Bush; Dana Ledoux Miller
- Based on: Disney's Moana by: Jared Bush; Ron Clements; John Musker
- Produced by: Dwayne Johnson; Beau Flynn; Dany Garcia; Hiram Garcia; Lin-Manuel Miranda
- Starring: Dwayne Johnson; Rena Owen; John Tui; Frankie Adams; Jemaine Clement; Catherine Laga'aia
- Cinematography: Óscar Faura
- Edited by: Melanie Ann Oliver
- Music by: Mark Mancina (score and songs); Lin-Manuel Miranda (songs); Opetaia Foaʻi (songs)
- Production companies: Walt Disney Pictures; Seven Bucks Productions; Flynn Picture Co.; 5000 Broadway Productions
- Distributed by: Walt Disney Studios; Motion Pictures
- Release date: July 10, 2026
- Running time: 115 minutes
- Country: United States
- Language: English
- Budget: $250 million
- Box office: $323.6 million

Moana is a 2026 American musical adventure film and a live-action adaptation of Disney Animation's 2016 film. As the overall third installment and the first live-action film in the Moana franchise, the film was directed by Thomas Kail and written by Jared Bush and Dana Ledoux Miller. It was produced by Dwayne Johnson, Hiram Garcia, Dany Garcia, Beau Flynn, and songwriter Lin-Manuel Miranda. The film stars Johnson (reprising his role as Maui from the animated films), Rena Owen, John Tui, Frankie Adams, Jemaine Clement (reprising his role as Tamatoa from the animated films) and introducing Catherine Laga'aia in her film debut as the title character.

Development of a live-action Moana film was announced by Johnson in April 2023, with Kail hired as director in the following May. Laga'aia was announced in the title role in June 2024, along with the main supporting cast. Principal photography occurred in Atlanta and Hawaii between July and November 2024. With a production budget of $250 million, Moana is one of the most expensive films ever made.

Moana was released by Walt Disney Studios Motion Pictures in the United States on July 10, 2026. Unlike the original version, it underperformed at the box office, grossing $323.6 million worldwide against a $250 million budget, and received mixed to negative reviews from critics.

== Plot ==
Long ago, on the Polynesian island of Motunui, the inhabitants worship the goddess of nature, Te Fiti: a living island who brought life to the ocean using a pounamu stone as her heart and the source of her power. Maui, the shape-shifting demigod of the wind and sea and master of wayfinding, stole Te Fiti's heart and gave humanity the power of creation. Te Fiti disintegrated, and Maui was attacked by Te Kā, a volcanic demon. Maui lost both the heart and his magic fish hook to the depths of the sea before he disappeared.

A thousand years later, the ocean chooses Moana, the daughter of Motunui's chief Tui, to return the heart to Te Fiti. Tui and Sina, Moana's parents, try to keep her away from the ocean to prepare her to become the island's chief. Sixteen years later, blight strikes the island, killing vegetation and shrinking the fish catch. Moana suggests going beyond the island's reef with her pet pig, Pua, to catch more fish and explore the oceans, but Tui forbids it.

Moana tries to conquer the reef but is overpowered by the tides and shipwrecked. Moana's grandmother, Tala, shows her a secret cavern of ships and reveals that Motunui's people were voyagers until Maui stole Te Fiti's heart; the ocean was no longer safe. Tala explains that Te Kā's darkness is destroying the island, but it can be cured if Moana finds Maui and has him restore Te Fiti's heart. Having been given the heart by the ocean, Tala gives it to Moana. Tala later becomes gravely ill and tells Moana to find Maui.

Moana sets sail on a camakau from the cavern along with her dimwitted pet rooster, Heihei, who stowed away on it. They are caught in a typhoon and shipwrecked on an island, where she finds Maui stranded. She demands Maui return the heart, but he refuses and traps her in a cave before leaving on her boat. She escapes and confronts Maui, who reluctantly lets her on the camakau. They are attacked by Kakamora, coconut pirates who seek the heart, but Moana and Maui escape.

Moana doesn't see Maui as a hero since he stole the heart and cursed the world, and convinces him to redeem himself by returning the heart. However, Maui first needs to retrieve his fishhook from Tamatoa, a giant coconut crab, in Lalotai, the Realm of Monsters. While Moana distracts Tamatoa, Maui retrieves his hook, only to find he can no longer control his shape-shifting. He is overpowered by Tamatoa, but Moana manages to help them escape. Maui reveals his first tattoo was earned when his human parents abandoned him as an infant, and the gods granted him his powers out of pity. After reassurance from Moana, Maui teaches her the art of wayfinding, regaining control of his powers, and the two grow closer.

They arrive at Te Fiti's island, only to be attacked by Te Kā. Moana refuses to turn back, and the confrontation badly damages Maui's hook. Unwilling to lose his hook again, Maui abandons Moana, who loses hope and tearfully asks the ocean to find someone else to restore the heart. The ocean obliges and takes the heart, but Tala's spirit appears, inspiring Moana to find her true calling. Moana retrieves the heart and sails back to confront Te Kā. Maui returns, having had a change of heart, and buys Moana time to reach Te Fiti by fighting Te Kā, thereby destroying his hook. Upon being unable to find Te Fiti, Moana realizes Te Kā is Te Fiti, but corrupted without her heart. The ocean clears a path for Moana, allowing her to return the heart to Te Fiti, who heals the ocean and the islands from blight. Maui apologizes to Te Fiti, who fixes his hook and Moana's boat before falling into a deep sleep and becoming an island.

Moana bids farewell to Maui and Te Fiti, then returns home and reunites with her parents. After placing a shell on top of the stack of stones placed by all previous chiefs, Moana takes up her role as chieftess and wayfinder, leading her people as they resume voyaging, accompanied by Maui.

== Cast ==
- Dwayne Johnson as Maui, a legendary and strong-willed, yet egotistical shapeshifting demigod who sets off with Moana on her journey. Johnson reprises his role from the animated films.
- Catherine Laga'aia as Moana, the curious daughter of village chief Tui and his wife Sina, who is chosen by the ocean to restore the heart of Te Fiti.
  - Amaya Masoli appears as 8-year-old Moana while Emma Puahi-Shapazian appears as 4-year-old Moana.
- Rena Owen as Gramma Tala, Moana's grandmother and Tui's mother. Like Moana, Tala shares a passion for the ocean and the two have a very deep bond.
- John Tui as Chief Tui, Moana's father, Sina's husband, and Tala's son. He is chief of Motunui Island.
- Frankie Adams as Sina, Moana's mother, Tui's wife, and chieftess of Motunui.
- Jemaine Clement as the voice of Tamatoa, a giant, villainous, treasure-hoarding coconut crab from Lalotai, the Realm of Monsters, and Maui's nemesis. Clement also reprises his role from the animated films.

== Production ==
=== Development ===
In 2019, Walt Disney Pictures privately approached Dwayne Johnson with plans for a live-action adaptation of Moana (2016). On April 3, 2023, Johnson publicly announced the news and noted that he would reprise his role as Maui in addition to producing alongside his ex-wife Dany Garcia and her brother Hiram Garcia for Seven Bucks Productions, and Beau Flynn for Flynn Picture Co. The animated film's lead star Auliʻi Cravalho would serve as executive producer. Johnson remarked, "This story is my culture, and this story is emblematic of our people's grace and warrior strength. I wear this culture proudly on my skin and in my soul, and this once-in-a-lifetime opportunity to reunite with Maui, inspired by the mana and spirit of my late grandfather, High Chief Peter Maivia, is one that runs very deep for me. [...] [T]here is no better world for us to honor the story of our people, our passion and our purpose than through the realm of music and dance, which is at the core of who we are as Polynesian people." Sean Bailey, Disney Live Action's president of production at the time, acknowledged that, although only seven years had passed since the animated film was released, the celebration of Disney's 100th anniversary contributed to the decision to remake the film so soon. The budget of the film was US$200–250 million.

On May 31, 2023, Thomas Kail was announced as the director, making his narrative feature directorial debut after helming the live film recording of the Broadway production of Hamilton (2020).

=== Casting ===
Casting was expected to begin later in the year, but was suspended until November 8, 2023, due to the 2023 SAG-AFTRA strike. In February 2024, Johnson stated that an actress had been cast in the titular role, but her identity would be kept under wraps for the time being. In June 2024, Catherine Laga'aia was announced as the actress in the titular role, alongside John Tui, Frankie Adams, and Rena Owen joining the cast, with Jared Bush and Moana 2 co-director Dana Ledoux Miller writing the screenplay. This marked the third collaboration between Johnson and Tui, after Hobbs & Shaw (2019) and Young Rock (2021–2023).

=== Filming ===
Principal photography began in Atlanta, Georgia on July 29, 2024, under the working title Canon, and wrapped in Hawaii on November 22. It was previously scheduled to begin filming in June 2024 under the working title Motorheads, after being delayed from an October 2023 start date due to the SAG-AFTRA strike. Óscar Faura serves as cinematographer. Bill Westenhofer serves as the visual effects supervisor, having left the Marvel Cinematic Universe film Captain America: Brave New World (2025) to do so. In August 2025, it was revealed that the studio wanted to use an AI-generated deepfake of Johnson's face composited onto a body double for select shots with the actor's approval and the help of AI company Metaphysic, but later abandoned the idea to avoid potential controversy in the midst of societal and governmental issues surrounding the regulation of AI in the filmmaking process and everyday life. Melanie Oliver edited the film.

== Music ==
Mark Mancina, who provided the musical score for the original film and its sequel, confirmed in December 2024 that he would return to score the remake. Lin-Manuel Miranda, who was a songwriter for the original film, also returned. He was not involved with Moana 2 due to scheduling conflicts with Mufasa: The Lion King. Miranda wrote "Along the Way" for the remake with Auli'i Cravalho, Catherine Laga'aia, and Dwayne Johnson performing the end credits version of the song.

Johnson and his wife Lauren Hashian executive produced Moana: Voices Across the Ocean, a companion album by Pacific Island artists released on July 31, 2026, featuring songs inspired by the Moana films and a new version of "We Know the Way".

== Release ==
=== Theatrical ===
Moana was released on July 10, 2026, coinciding with the 10th anniversary of the franchise and the release of the original film. The film was released in IMAX. It was originally scheduled for release on June 27, 2025, but following the announcement of Moana 2, it was delayed by one year to increase the gap between the two films.

=== Home media ===
Moana was released digitally on September 8, 2026, and on Ultra HD Blu-ray, Blu-ray, and DVD on October 6, 2026. The film began streaming on Disney+ on October 21, 2026.

In the United Kingdom, Moana debuted at No. 1 on the Official Film Chart for the week ending September 16, ahead of Supergirl and Obsession. In the United States, the film topped Fandango at Home's weekly digital sales and rental chart for the week ending September 13, following its premium digital release on September 8. On physical media, it was the best-selling film for the week ending October 10, according to Circana's VideoScan tracking service, which compiles DVD and Blu-ray sales. It subsequently ranked as the third best-selling film for the month of October.

Nielsen Media Research, which records streaming viewership on certain American television screens, reported that Moana was the most-streamed film between October 19–25, with 579 million minutes viewed. The following week, from October 26 to November 1, it placed fifth, with 273 million minutes of watch time.

== Reception ==
=== Box office ===
As of October 4, 2026, Moana has grossed $126.2 million in the United States and Canada, and $197.6 million in other territories, for a worldwide total of $323.9 million. Following its low opening weekend, Deadline Hollywood estimated the film could lose the studio between $100-125 million. Disney CEO Josh D'Amaro said that the film did not meet their box office expectations, but contributed to merchandise sales and theme park admissions, and that it was expected to perform well on Disney+, where the original Moana is one of the most-streamed movies of all time. Dana Walden, Disney president and chief creative officer, attributed the film's underperformance to being released 18 months after Moana 2.

In the United States and Canada, Moana was projected to gross between $60–65 million during its opening weekend from 3,875 theaters. The film was also projected to have a global opening of $130 million, the lowest from a Disney live-action film. After the film earned $18 million on Friday, which included Thursday previews, the domestic box office projections were dropped to $42–46 million. The film ended up debuting to $43 million domestically, and $52 million overseas for a worldwide total of $95 million. This start was seen as a "misfire" by several media outlets. It ranks as among the lowest domestic opening weekend earnings for a Disney live-action adaptation, below 2019's Dumbo ($46 million), but above Snow White from the year prior ($42.2 million). The film's underperformance was attributed to "fatigue" from Disney live-action remakes and its release during a crowded marketplace, including competition from Disney's own Toy Story 5. In its second weekend, it dropped into second place behind The Odyssey, declining by 56% and making $19 million. The film once again finished in second place in its third weekend, declining 41% and making $10.6 million.

=== Critical response ===
On review aggregation website Rotten Tomatoes, Moana has an approval rating of 33% based on 198 reviews with an average rating of 4.8/10. The site's critical consensus reads, "The sea calls to no one in this underwhelming new version of Moana, a rather lifeless endeavor that solidifies its animated predecessor as the superior adventure." Metacritic, which assigns a normalized rating to reviews, gave it a score of 42 out of 100 based on 40 critics, indicating "mixed or average reviews". Audiences polled by CinemaScore gave the film an average grade of "A−" on an A+ to F scale.

Tasha Robinson of Polygon stated that, "Virtually every line, beat, and song in the new movie is identical to the 2016 version, apart from a few minor punch-ups or extra comedy tags here and there.... There's no artistic or aesthetic reason for this movie to exist." Wilson Chapman of IndieWire wrote, "This is, undoubtedly, the most faithful any Disney remake has ever been, hitting almost every single beat from the original with such mathematical accuracy that it's really not an exaggeration to call it a shot-for-shot facsimile on par with Gus Van Sant's Psycho." In a one out of five review, Clarisse Loughrey of The Independent stated that "Dwayne Johnson's terrible wig is just one low point of a film that has all the visual allure of a Febreze advert." Jonathan Romney of The Observer described it as "an unimaginatively faithful remake that leaves the original intact, complete with songs co-written by Lin-Manuel Miranda. But the replacement of animated beings with live actors manages to ramp up the folkloric kitsch considerably."

Liz Shannon Miller of Consequence rated the film a B−, stating that, "Moana contains no nightmare fuel on the level of 2025's Snow White—which ends up being high praise for adaptations like these." Marshall Shaffer of The Playlist stated that "this film is destined for great viewership in households that accidentally click the wrong title on the service and can't reach the remote to change back to the original."

Alissa Wilkinson of The New York Times called the film "the most pointless, and perhaps not accidentally, the worst" of all of Disney's live-action remakes.

=== Accolades ===
Award	Date of ceremony	Category	Recipient(s)	Result	Ref.
Nickelodeon Kids' Choice Awards	November 14, 2026	Favorite Movie	Moana	Nominated	
Nickelodeon Kids' Choice Awards	November 14, 2026	Favorite Movie Actress	Catherine Laga'aia	Nominated	
Nickelodeon Kids' Choice Awards	November 14, 2026	Favorite Movie Actor	Dwayne Johnson	Nominated	

== See also ==
- List of remakes and adaptations of Disney animated films
