= Moana 2 =

2024 animated Disney film

- Theatrical release poster
- Directed by: David Derrick Jr.; Jason Hand; Dana Ledoux Miller
- Screenplay by: Jared Bush; Dana Ledoux Miller
- Story by: Jared Bush; Dana Ledoux Miller; Bek Smith
- Produced by: Christina Chen; Yvett Merino
- Starring: Dwayne Johnson; Auliʻi Cravalho
- Edited by: Michael Louis Hill; Jeremy Milton
- Music by: Mark Mancina
- Production company: Walt Disney Animation Studios
- Distributed by: Walt Disney Studios; Motion Pictures (Note: Distributed under the Walt Disney Pictures banner.)
- Release dates: November 21, 2024 (Lanikuhonua Cultural Institute); November 27, 2024 (United States)
- Running time: 100 minutes
- Country: United States
- Language: English
- Budget: $150 million
- Box office: $1.059 billion

Moana 2 (Note: Also known as Vaiana 2 or Oceania 2 in some markets) is a 2024 American animated musical adventure film directed by David Derrick Jr., Jason Hand, and Dana Ledoux Miller and written by Miller and Jared Bush. Produced by Walt Disney Animation Studios, it is the second animated film in the Moana franchise, following the 2016 film. Most of the principal cast members reprise their roles including Dwayne Johnson, Auliʻi Cravalho, Rachel House, Temuera Morrison, Nicole Scherzinger and Alan Tudyk. Set three years after the first film, it follows Moana reuniting with the demigod Maui and assembling a wayfinding crew to find the lost island of Motufetu, break its curse, and reconnect the people of the ocean.

A follow-up to 2016's Moana was originally developed as a miniseries for Disney+, but by February 2024, it had been reworked into a theatrical sequel. Mark Mancina and Opetaia Foaʻi, the composers and co-songwriters of the first film, returned to score and co-write the songs, while Abigail Barlow and Emily Bear served as the main songwriters.

Moana 2 premiered at the Lanikuhonua Cultural Institute in Kapolei, Hawaii, on November 21, 2024, and was released by Walt Disney Studios Motion Pictures in the United States on November 27. The film received mixed reviews from critics and grossed $1.059 billion worldwide, outgrossing its predecessor and becoming the third highest-grossing film of 2024. It was nominated for Best Animated Feature Film at the 82nd Golden Globe Awards. A sequel is in development. A live-action remake to the first film was released in 2026.

== Plot ==
Three years after becoming a chieftess and wayfinder for her people, (Note: As depicted in Moana (2016)) Moana spends her days exploring other islands near her home island of Motunui in the hope of finding people connected to the ocean. On her return from one such voyage, Moana is named Motunui's first tautai (master wayfinder) in a thousand years.

In a vision, Moana's ancestor, Tautai Vasa, reveals why none of those people are connected anymore: the malicious storm god Nalo wanted power over the mortals, so he sunk a legendary island called Motufetu, which connected all of the islands, down to the depths of the ocean. Vasa further warns that the people of Motunui will go extinct in the future if Moana cannot find a way to raise Motufetu. In response to this call from the ancestors, Moana assembles a crew of people from Motunui — craftswoman Loto, historian Moni, and grumpy elderly farmer Kele, alongside her pet pig and rooster, Pua and Heihei — to follow the path of a comet across the ocean towards Motufetu.

Meanwhile, Maui is seeking Motufetu himself since he had a previous quarrel with Nalo, but he is captured by Nalo's enforcer, Matangi. Maui is reluctant to contact Moana, as he fears she may not survive if she comes to help. Moana and her crew are captured by the Kakamora, a tribe of savage coconut-like pirates that Moana previously encountered, who reveal that Nalo's actions against Motufetu had caused them to be disconnected from their home island. A Kakamora named Kotu helps the crew paralyze a gargantuan monster clam inside of which is Matangi's lair. While the crew finds Maui, Moana meets Matangi and learns that she is not happy serving Nalo. Matangi helps Moana escape and reunite with Maui and her friends, before sending them to where Nalo is.

Maui warns that Nalo's realm is deadlier compared to the mortal realm and that fighting him will spell certain death for mere mortals. Nalo's monsters ambush the group, damaging their raft and washing them ashore on an isolated island. Moana begins to despair, but Maui encourages her to keep on going. With Moana revitalized, the group plans to have Maui raise Motufetu so that Moana can touch it, as that is the only way to stop Nalo. Her crew repairs her raft, but when the group ventures forth to confront Nalo, they encounter a gigantic storm.

Moana, realizing that Nalo is trying to stop humans from breaking the curse, asks Maui to lift Motufetu enough for her to touch it. Maui begins to pull up Motufetu with his giant hook, but Nalo strips Maui of his demigod powers with a lightning bolt. Moana, in a moment of desperation, dives into the ocean to touch Motufetu underwater, but as she succeeds, Nalo's lightning kills her. Maui jumps in after her body, and with a magical chant, summons the spirits of Tautai Vasa and Moana's ancestors, including her grandmother Tala, who help revive her as a demigoddess, with Moana gaining a wayfinder's tattoo. Maui, also regaining his powers as a demigod, finally raises Motufetu and helps Moana reconnect the people with the ocean.

The crew returns home to Motunui, leading a flotilla of the people of the ocean, and a celebration is held in Moana's honor. Meanwhile, Nalo plans his revenge and is about to punish Matangi for helping Moana, when the giant crab Tamatoa arrives to join his cause.

== Voice cast ==
- Auliʻi Cravalho as Moana, the curious daughter of village chief Tui and his wife Sina, who is chosen by the ocean to break the curse on the island of Motufetu
  - Cravalho reprises her role in the film's Hawaiian language dubbing.
- Dwayne Johnson as Maui, a strong-willed shapeshifting demigod who accompanies Moana on her journey.
- Hualālai Chung as Moni, a member of Moana's wayfinding crew and a fan of Maui's
  - Chung reprises his role in the film's Hawaiian language dubbing.
- Rose Matafeo as Loto, a brainy but quirky craftswoman member of Moana's wayfinding crew
- David Fane as Kele, a grumpy farmer and member of Moana's wayfinding crew
- Awhimai Fraser as Matangi, Nalo's enforcer who controls bats.
  - Fraser reprises her role in the film's Māori-language dubbing.
- Khaleesi Lambert-Tsuda as Simea, Moana's little sister
- Temuera Morrison as Tui, Moana's father, and chief of Motunui Island. Unlike the first film, where his singing voice was done by Christopher Jackson, Morrison does his own singing.
  - Morrison reprises his role in the film's Māori language dubbing.
- Nicole Scherzinger as Sina, Moana's mother and Chieftess of Motunui
- Rachel House as Tala, Tui's late mother and Moana's paternal grandmother, who returns as a manta ray spirit
  - House reprises her role in the film's Māori-language dubbing.
- Gerald Ramsey as Tautai Vasa, Moana's ancestor
- Alan Tudyk as Heihei, Moana's pet rooster

Additionally, some of Dwayne Johnson's family members have voice roles in the film including daughters Jasmine and Tiana as members of Moana's fan club, "MOANA-BEs", and his mother Ata Maivia Johnson as a villager. Tofiga Fepulea'i voices the storm god and main antagonist Nalo in the mid-credits scene, which also features the giant coconut crab Tamatoa from the first film with Jemaine Clement reprising his role.

== Production ==
=== Development ===
In December 2020, during a Disney Investor Day meeting, Walt Disney Animation Studios chief creative officer Jennifer Lee announced that a long-form musical comedy series titled Moana: The Series, based on the 2016 film of the same name, was in development at the studio and set for release on Disney+ in 2023. The series was to consist of five episodes. By August 2021, it was reported that Osnat Shurer would once again serve as producer. In January 2022, it was announced that David Derrick Jr., storyboard artist for the first film, would serve as the writer and director. The series entered development simultaneously with the live-action remake of Moana according to Jared Bush, a writer of the film and screenplay writer of the 2016 animated film.

Dana Ledoux Miller came onto the series in early 2023 as a consulting writer, having finished writing the live-action remake with Bush, and turned in several revisions for the series.

According to Bush, the director and the writers repeatedly received feedback during development to the effect of: "We love this story. Why is it not going on the biggest screen you can possibly imagine?" In January 2024, Walt Disney Studios president Alan Bergman "informed the team that they needed to shift rapidly from making a five-episode streaming series to a second Moana feature film". This last-minute "story pivot" was possible because nearly all the actual animation work for Disney animated films is not performed until the final year before the release date—everything before that is development.

In February 2024, Disney CEO Bob Iger officially announced that the series had been reworked into a theatrical sequel titled Moana 2, with Derrick and Shurer remaining attached to the project. Iger explained that this occurred after Disney executives saw early footage: "We were impressed with what we saw and knew it deserved a theatrical release". By the release of the first trailer in May, Jason Hand and Dana Ledoux Miller were confirmed as co-directors alongside Derrick, while Christina Chen and Yvett Merino were revealed to replace Shurer as the film's producers.

=== Casting ===
Shortly after the announcement that the series was being repurposed into a theatrical feature film, Auliʻi Cravalho and Dwayne Johnson were confirmed to reprise their respective roles as Moana and Maui. Johnson later confirmed that he had been involved with the project since its conception, including its development, stating: "I can't wait for fans to see the film, the technology, the effects, cutting edge. We all really went for it. We thought if we're gonna make a sequel to something so beloved, let's really go for it." Several more cast members were unveiled at the Annecy International Animation Film Festival, including Temuera Morrison and Nicole Scherzinger reprising their roles as Moana's parents from the first film. New additions include Khaleesi Lambert-Tsuda as Moana's new sister, and Rose Matafeo, David Fane, and Hualālai Chung as members of Moana's wayfinding crew.

According to Cravalho, this film was the first time "that a Disney princess has been allowed to age." When Cravalho returned to the recording studio after the first film to record lines for Disney fireworks shows, Disney on Ice, and Lego Disney Princess, she was repeatedly asked to raise her vocal pitch to sound like herself as a teenager at age 16. She was delighted when the film's directors allowed her to record Moana's lines at age 19 with her natural voice as a woman in her early twenties.

=== Animation ===
Animation was handled at Walt Disney Animation Studios' Vancouver studio when it was being developed as a series, while pre-production and storyboarding took place at the Burbank studio. It is the first feature film to be made at the Vancouver studio. At the Annecy International Animation Film Festival, it was revealed that veterans Mark Henn and Eric Goldberg would supervise a team of apprentices of hand-drawn animators for Maui's tattoos. Goldberg was a supervising animator for "Mini Maui" for the first film.

In May 2025, The Animation Guild published a report estimating that as a result of Disney Animation's decision to largely outsource the animation work to its new Vancouver studio, California had lost as much as 817 jobs, $87 million in wages, and $178 million in state gross domestic product.

=== Music ===
Mark Mancina and Opetaia Foaʻi returned to compose the film score, while Abigail Barlow and Emily Bear contributed songs, replacing Lin-Manuel Miranda from the first film. Barlow and Bear are the youngest and the first all-female songwriting duo to write the songs for a Disney film. Walt Disney Music president Tom MacDougall recruited Barlow and Bear in the fall of 2021, after hearing the quality of their work on The Unofficial Bridgerton Musical, and about a year later, in 2022, they began to work with the production team on writing songs. Miranda assisted by providing Barlow with "a stack of books" on how to write lyrics for musical films. Bear focused on studying the existing Moana score, with its Polynesian instrumentation, and learning how to write songs with that musical vocabulary. Cravalho stated that having Barlow and Bear, two young women, help voice Moana's "story, which is a young woman finding her way, I couldn't think of a better duo than Barlow and Bear. ... This is a new part of my voice. ... This film digs into these low notes in these times of indecision when we don't know what we are supposed to do next. There's a lot of deeper layers to these songs."

Miranda later explained that the reason he was not asked to return for the sequel came down to a matter of timing. He was a longtime fan of The Lion King (1994) and desperately wanted to work on Mufasa: The Lion King (2024), but director Barry Jenkins had to first wait six months for him. Miranda was simply too busy in the second half of 2021 with finishing the songs for Encanto (2021), finishing up the editing of his first feature film as a director, and having to do press interviews to promote Encanto and two other films. By the time Miranda was done with Encanto interviews, he had to get started on Mufasa right away in early 2022. Meanwhile, Disney Animation moved forward with Barlow and Bear, and they were "already cooking" by the time the decision was made to turn the streaming series into a feature-length sequel.

On November 7, 2024, Disney revealed a full tracklist, along with the first single "Beyond" by Cravalho which was billed as a spiritual sequel to the original Moana anthem, "How Far I'll Go". On November 11, Johnson revealed his song "Can I Get a Chee Hoo?" as a female empowerment song for Moana's character, which follows the tune of Maui's original "You're Welcome". The Original Motion Picture Soundtrack was released on November 22. "Beyond" and "Can I Get a Chee Hoo?" were nominated for the 2024 Hollywood Music in Media Award for Best Original Song in an Animated Film, and "Beyond" has been nominated for a 2025 Society of Composers & Lyricists Award for Outstanding Original Song for a Comedy or Musical Visual Media Production.

== Release ==
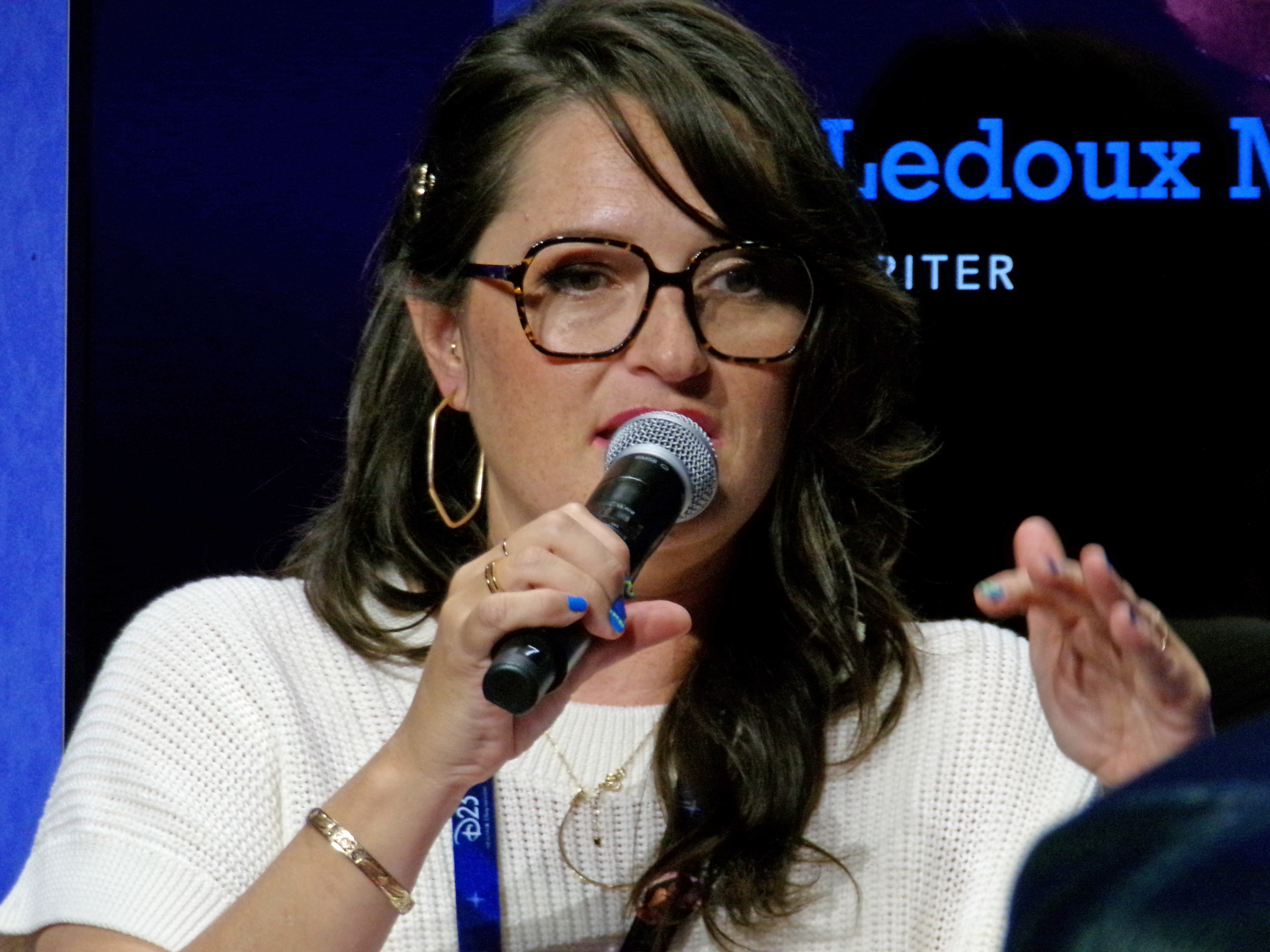
Dana Ledoux Miller, co-director and co-screenwriter

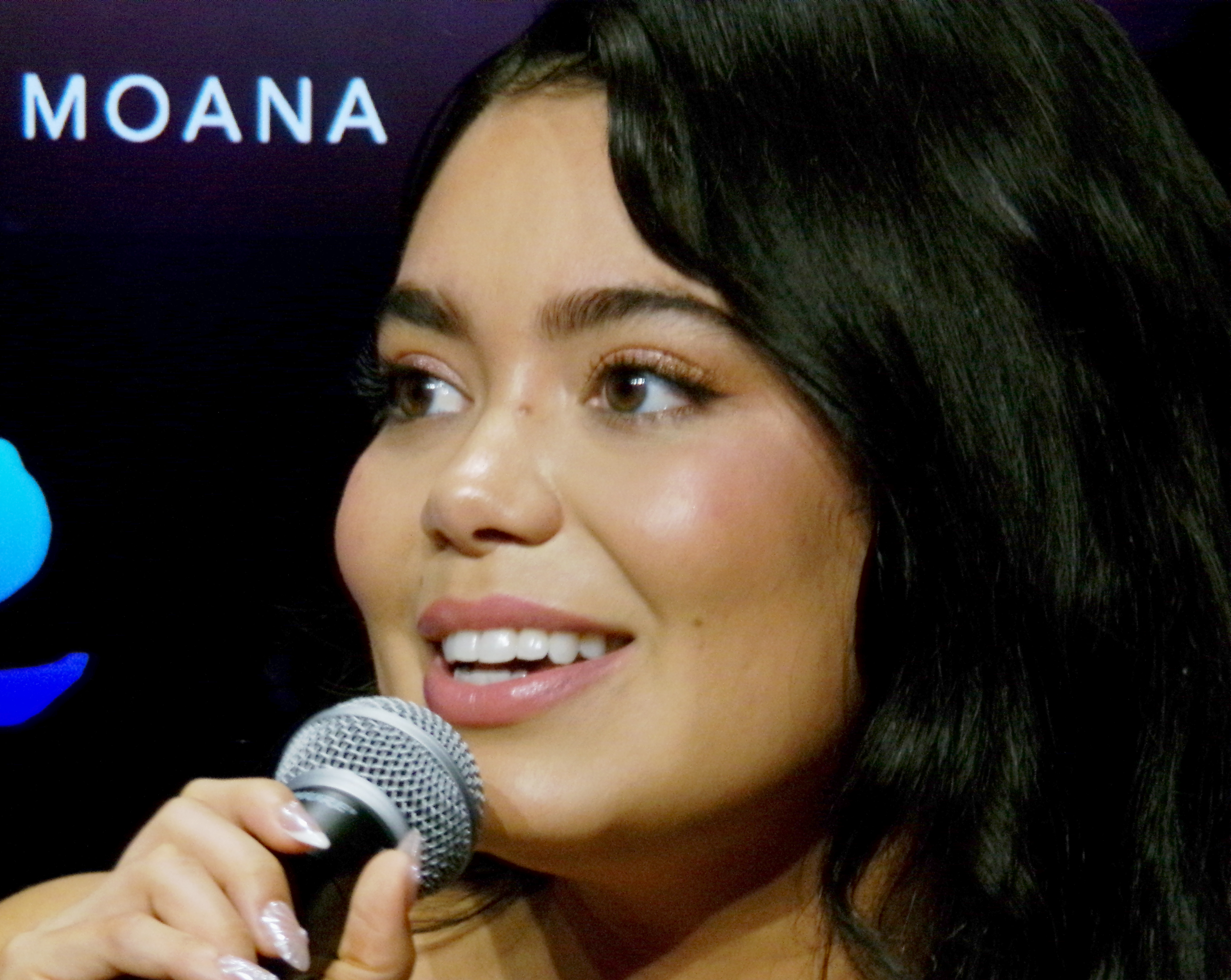
Auliʻi Cravalho, the voice of Moana

Miller and Cravalho discussed their work on the film at D23 2024 in Anaheim, California.

Moana 2 had its world premiere at the Lanikuhonua Cultural Institute in Kapolei, Hawaii on November 21, 2024, and was released in theaters in the United States on November 27, 2024. It became the 44th-highest-grossing movie of all time.

=== Marketing ===
The first trailer for the film was released on May 29, 2024, after debuting at CinemaCon the month before. The trailer earned over 178 million views in its first 24 hours across all platforms, breaking a new record as the most watched trailer of all time for a Disney animated film, a record previously held by Frozen 2 and Pixar's Inside Out 2 (the latter of which the trailer was attached to in the theaters). A sneak peek of the film was screened at the 2024 Annecy International Animation Film Festival on June 14, 2024.

On August 9, 2024, Cravalho and Johnson appeared at the Disney Entertainment Showcase at the 2024 D23 Expo in Anaheim, California to promote the film and release a new trailer, which was released online shortly thereafter. During the D23 presentation, Cravalho performed a new song from the film, "We're Back," accompanied by Polynesian dancers. Johnson also used the presentation to announce a new live-action Monster Jam film that he would be producing with Disney.

=== Localization ===
Like the first film, Moana 2 was released in European countries with the title and protagonist's name changed to Vaiana due to a trademark conflict.

Four special dubbings in Polynesian languages were released for the sequel, in Hawaiian, Māori, Tahitian, and Samoan. The first three languages had previously received a dubbing of the first film, while a Samoan dubbing of the sequel was released without the original film having been dubbed. Cravalho reprised the lead role in the Hawaiian dubbing of the sequel, like she did in the first film, while several other members of the cast reprised their roles in the Māori dubbing.

Of the six films dubbed into Māori so far, Moana 2 is the first to have premiered in New Zealand simultaneously in English and Māori. This marks the third time in Disney's history a dubbing in an indigenous language is released at the same time as regular dubbings. The first such instance happened with the Tahitian dubbing of Moana, released in 2016 in French Polynesia. The second was the Sámi dubbing of Frozen 2, released in 2019 in Finland, Norway, and Sweden.

=== Home media ===
Moana 2 was released as a digital download on January 28, 2025, began streaming on Disney+ on March 12, 2025, and was released on 4K Ultra HD, Blu-ray, and DVD on March 18.

In the United Kingdom, Moana 2 debuted at No. 1 on the Official Film Chart based on digital downloads, remaining at the top for a second consecutive week with over 33,000 copies sold. In the United States, it topped both the iTunes and Fandango at Home charts for the week ending February 2. The film maintained the number-one position on both charts in its second week. For 2025, Moana 2 ranked seventh overall on Fandango at Home's digital sales and rentals chart. In physical media for 2025, Moana 2 ranked fifteenth on the Top Selling Titles on Disc (DVD + Blu-ray) of 2025, according to Circana VideoScan. The film achieved a sales index of 32.61 compared to the year's top-selling title. Blu-ray formats made up 44% of total unit sales, while 4K Ultra HD accounted for 4%.

On Disney+, Moana 2 garnered 27.3 million views in its first five days, becoming the third-highest launch ever for a theatrical film on the platform and the best launch for a Walt Disney Animation Studios title since Encanto in December 2021. Nielsen Media Research, which records streaming viewership on some U.S. television screens, reported that the film accumulated 1.9 billion minutes of watch time between March 10–16, making it the most-streamed film that week. Moana 2 was subsequently the sixth most-streamed title overall in March 2025, with 3.9 billion minutes viewed. Between January and June 2025, the film reached a total of 7.227 billion minutes streamed, ranking as the most-streamed film during that period. In December 2025, Disney announced that it was the most-watched film of the year on Disney+, with more than 80 million views. Nielsen later reported that Moana 2 was the second most-streamed film overall in 2025, with 9.43 billion minutes of watch time.

== Reception ==
=== Box office ===
Moana 2 grossed $460.4 million in the United States and Canada, and $598.8 million in other territories, for a total of $1.059 billion worldwide. Deadline Hollywood calculated the film's net profit as $415 million, accounting for production budgets, marketing, talent participations and other costs; box office grosses, television and streaming, and home media revenues, making Moana 2 the second-most profitable film of 2024.

In the United States and Canada, Moana 2 was originally projected to gross $105–115 million over the five-day Thanksgiving weekend. After making $57.8 million on its first day (including $13.8 million from Tuesday night previews, both the highest-ever for a Walt Disney Animation film and Thanksgiving week release), five-day estimates were raised to $175–200 million. It then made a record $28 million on Thanksgiving, nearly doubling the 2019 film Frozen 2's previous high of $14.9 million. It went on to debut to $139.8 million (and a total of $225 million over the five days), breaking Frozen 2's $130.3 million record for the best opening weekend for a Walt Disney Animation film and a Thanksgiving weekend release, as well as nearly matching the entire domestic run of the first film ($248.7 million). The worldwide five-day gross of $389 million surpassed the 2023 film The Super Mario Bros. Movie as the highest such opening for an animated film. In its second weekend the film made $52 million (a drop of 62.8%), remaining in first. In its third weekend, the film retained the top spot again, grossing $26.6 million (dropping 48% from its second weekend). The film was finally dethroned in its fourth weekend, grossing $13.1 million and finishing in fourth place. On January 19, 2025, the film crossed the $1 billion threshold, becoming the third film released in 2024 to do so.

=== Critical response ===
On the review aggregator website Rotten Tomatoes, 61% of 245 critics' reviews are positive, with an average rating of 6.0/10. The website's consensus reads: "Riding high on a wave of stunning animation even when its story runs adrift, Moana 2 isn't as inspired as the original but still delights as a colorful adventure." Metacritic, which uses a weighted average, assigned the film a score of 58 out of 100, based on 50 critics, indicating "mixed or average" reviews. Audiences polled by CinemaScore gave the film an average grade of "A–" on an A+ to F scale (down from the first's A), while those surveyed by PostTrak gave it an 89% overall positive score, with 64% saying they would "definitely recommend" it.

Writing for CinemaBlend, Dirk Libbey praised Moana 2 as "a really good movie", but also noted that it was too obvious that the film had been originally written as a much longer television series and then trimmed down for release as a feature film. Libbey pointed out that the film introduces viewers to several interesting characters like Matangi, Loto, Kele, and Moni, but fails to explore their backstories: the kind of subplots that would be "exactly where I would start" to cut if asked to condense several television scripts into a film script.

Radheyan Simonpillai (Globe and Mail) found the music flat and uninspired. Alison Willmore (Vulture) argued the film suffers from a lack of tension, part of Disney's recent trend away from colorful villains in favor of softer, internal conflicts. Owen Gleiberman (Variety) called it "an okay movie" and "efficient enough" to be a holiday hit, though far more product-like than its predecessor.

=== Accolades ===
Award	Date of ceremony	Category	Recipient(s)	Result	Ref.
American Music Awards	May 26, 2025	Favorite Soundtrack	Moana 2	Nominated	
Annie Awards	February 8, 2025	Outstanding Achievement for Animated Effects in an Animated Production	Santiago Robles, Marc Bryant, Deborah Carlson, Jake Rice, and Ian J. Coony	Nominated	
Annie Awards	February 8, 2025	Outstanding Achievement for Character Animation in an Animated Feature Production	Brian Scott	Nominated	
Annie Awards	February 8, 2025	Outstanding Achievement for Editorial in an Animated Feature Production	Jeremy Milton and Michael Louis Hill	Nominated	
Annie Awards	February 8, 2025	Outstanding Achievement for Storyboarding in an Animated Feature Production	Ryan Green	Nominated	
Black Reel Awards	February 17, 2025	Outstanding Voice Performance	Dwayne Johnson	Nominated	
Celebration of Asian Pacific Cinema and Television	October 22, 2024	Animation Award	David Derrick Jr., Jason Hand, Dana Ledoux Miller, Christina Chen and Yvett Merino	Won	
Golden Globe Award	January 5, 2025	Best Animated Feature Film	Moana 2	Nominated	
Hollywood Music in Media Awards	November 20, 2024	Best Original Song in an Animated Film	"Beyond" – Written by Abigail Barlow and Emily Bear; Performed by Auli'i Cravalho	Nominated	
Hollywood Music in Media Awards	November 20, 2024	Best Original Song in an Animated Film	"Can I Get a Chee Hoo?" – Written by Abigail Barlow & Emily Bear; Performed by Dwayne Johnson	Nominated	
NAACP Image Awards	February 22, 2025	Outstanding Animated Motion Picture	Moana 2	Nominated	
Nickelodeon Kids' Choice Awards	June 21, 2025	Favorite Animated Movie	Moana 2	Nominated	
Nickelodeon Kids' Choice Awards	June 21, 2025	Favorite Male Voice from an Animated Movie	Dwayne Johnson	Won	
Nickelodeon Kids' Choice Awards	June 21, 2025	Favorite Female Voice from an Animated Movie	Auli'i Cravalho	Won	
Nickelodeon Kids' Choice Awards	June 21, 2025	Favorite Song from a Movie	"Can I Get a Chee Hoo?" – Dwayne Johnson	Nominated	
Society of Composers & Lyricists Awards	February 12, 2025	Outstanding Original Song for a Comedy or Musical Visual Media Production	"Beyond" – Written by Emily Bear and Abigail Barlow	Nominated	
Visual Effects Society Awards	February 11, 2025	Outstanding Visual Effects in an Animated Feature	Carlos Cabral, Tucker Gilmore, Ian Gooding, Gabriela Hernandez	Nominated	
Visual Effects Society Awards	February 11, 2025	Outstanding Effects Simulations in an Animated Feature	Zoran Stojanoski, Jesse Erickson, Shamintha Kalamba Arachchi, Erin V. Ramos	Nominated	
Washington D.C. Area Film Critics Association	December 8, 2024	Best Voice Performance	Auli'i Cravalho	Nominated	

== Sequel ==
On July 2, 2026, during an interview for the live-action Moana (2026), Johnson confirmed that a third animated film in the Moana franchise is in development. He also confirmed that Jared Bush and Dana Ledoux Miller would return to write the script.
