= Moana (character) =

Title character of Disney's 2016 animated film of the same name

- Moana character
- Moana as she appears in the 2016 film.
- First appearance: Moana (2016)
- Created by: Ron Clements; John Musker
- Voiced by: Auliʻi Cravalho (2016-present); Louise Bush (toddler)
- Portrayed by: Catherine Laga'aia (live-action film)

In-universe information
- Full name: Moana
- Species: Demigoddess (formerly human)
- Titles: Tautai of Motunui; Chieftess of Motunui
- Occupation: Tribal chieftain; Wayfinding voyager Demigoddess
- Affiliation: Disney Princesses
- Family: Chief Tui (father); Sina (mother); Simea (younger sister)
- Relatives: Tala (paternal grandmother, deceased)
- Nationality: Polynesian

Moana of Motunui is the title character of the 2016 Walt Disney Animation Studios film Moana. Created by directors Ron Clements and John Musker, Moana is voiced by Hawaiian actress and singer Auliʻi Cravalho. As a toddler, she is voiced by Louise Bush. Moana returns in the sequel film Moana 2, which premiered in November 2024, again voiced by Cravalho, as well as a live-action remake film, in 2026, in which she is portrayed by Catherine Laga'aia.

Inspired by Polynesian mythology, Moana is depicted as the strong-willed daughter of a chief of a Polynesian village, who is chosen by the ocean itself to reunite a mystical relic with the goddess Te Fiti. When a blight strikes her island, Moana sets sail in search of Maui (Dwayne Johnson), a legendary demigod, in the hope of returning the relic to Te Fiti and saving her people. She then forms a crew and embarks on a voyage to recover the lost island of Motufetu and restore the channels that connected the people of the sea. It comes at the cost of her life, but she is revived as a demigoddess.

Moana received widespread critical acclaim for her independence as well as Cravalho for her vocal performance. By 2019, Moana was officially inducted into the Disney Princess line-up, becoming the twelfth member.

== Development ==
=== Conception and writing ===
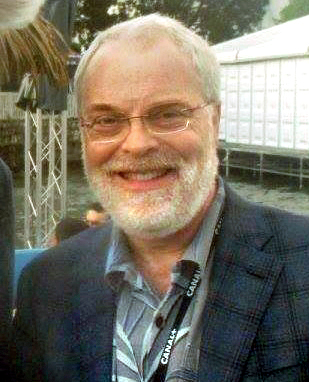
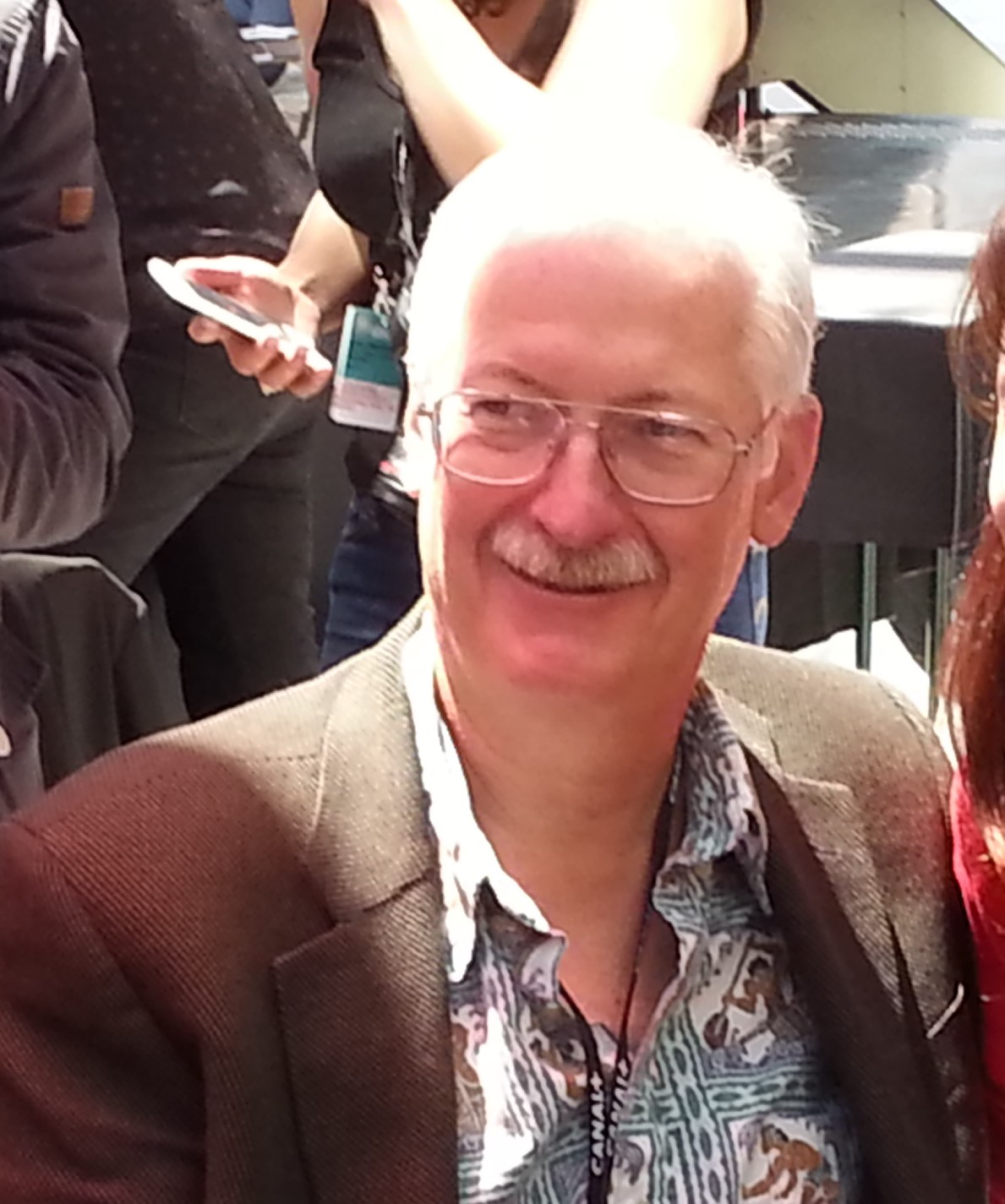
Directors Ron Clements (right) and John Musker (left) created Moana.

After directing The Princess and the Frog (2009), Clements and Musker started working on an adaptation of Terry Pratchett's Mort, but problems with acquiring the necessary film rights prevented them from continuing with that project. To avoid a recurrence of that issue, they pitched three original ideas. The genesis of one of those ideas (the one that was ultimately green-lit) occurred in 2011, when Musker began reading up on Polynesian mythology and learned of the heroic exploits of the demigod Māui. Intrigued with the rich culture of Polynesia, he felt it would be a suitable subject for an animated film. Shortly thereafter, Musker and Clements wrote a treatment and pitched it to John Lasseter, who recommended that both of them should go on research trips. Accordingly, in 2012, Clements and Musker went on research trips to Fiji, Samoa, and Tahiti to meet the people of the South Pacific Ocean and learn about their culture. At first, they had planned to make the film entirely about Maui, but their initial research trips inspired Clements to pitch a new idea focused on the young daughter of a chief.

Clements and Musker were fascinated to learn during their research that the people of Polynesia abruptly stopped making long-distance voyages about three thousand years ago. Their navigational traditions predated those of European explorers, beginning around 300 CE. Native people of the Pacific possessed knowledge of the world and their place in it prior to the incursion of foreigners. For example, Kānaka Maoli (Native Hawaiians) were well aware of the existence of far away islands, had names for these places, and were interested in exploring them to benefit their societies. This voyaging heritage was made possible by a geographical knowledge system based on individual perspectives rather than the European cardinal direction system. The reasons for the halt of this voyaging tradition remain unknown, but scholars have offered climate change and resulting shifts in ocean currents and wind patterns as one possible explanation. Native peoples of the Pacific resumed voyaging again a thousand years later; Clements and Musker set the film at that point in time, about two thousand years ago. The setting on a fictional island in the central Pacific Ocean drew inspiration from elements of the real-life island nations of Fiji, Samoa, and Tonga.

Taika Waititi wrote the initial screenplay, but went home to New Zealand in 2012 to focus on his newborn first child and What We Do in the Shadows (2014). The first draft focused on Moana as the sole daughter in a family with "five or six brothers", in which gender played into the story. However, the brothers and gender-based themes were deleted from the story, as the directors thought Moana's journey should be about finding herself. A subsequent draft presented Moana's father as the one who wanted to resume voyage navigation, but it was rewritten to have him oppose navigation so he would not overshadow Moana. Instead, Pamela Ribon came up with the idea of a grandmother character for the film, who would serve as a mentor linking Moana to ancient traditions. Another version focused on Moana rescuing her father, who had been lost at sea. The film's story changed drastically during the development phase, and that idea ultimately survived only as a subtle element of the father's backstory.

=== Voice ===
In late 2014, a global casting call for the role of Moana began. Cravalho did not consider auditioning for Moana as there had "already been so many great submissions over YouTube" and decided to focus on school instead as she was in her first year which was "confusing as it is". Cravalho was discovered at an audition to perform as entertainment at a non-profit event, without knowing that the agent who had attended those auditions was the same for Moana. Agent Rachel Sutton asked Cravalho if she wanted to audition for Moana; she was the last girl to be seen on the last day of casting. During her audition, Cravalho sang 30 seconds of her favorite Disney song—"I See the Light" from Tangled—as well as Hawaiian songs. Cravalho stated she was confused throughout the entire audition—especially the process of slating—but felt she "gave it [her] best in the audition and it worked really well." In October 2015, Cravalho was officially chosen as Moana's voice actress. Producer Osnat Shurer said: "We were looking for someone who could embody the character, with all the strength and commitment, humor, heart and compassion. When we met Auliʻi, she was just bringing Moana to life."

"I've grown up on an island all my life—so has she—and we're both deeply connected to our culture. I go to an all-Hawaiian school, so even the mythology and the folklore of Maui is something I grew up with. I love that Disney has taken the time and effort to do research about us and extensive research about our culture and find those wonderful stories about Maui. [...] Her journey is something I feel as well—that journey to find yourself. It's a recurring theme I think everyone can really take away [from]."
—Auli'i Cravalho on her similarities with Moana

Cravalho described Moana as being brave, beautiful, kind and strong, explaining she could list adjectives "all day". She called her a model for everyone, not just for girls. Furthermore, she stated that Moana recognises her desires and is eager to obtain them. The actress enjoyed viewing her development and her assistance to grow her culture. Cravalho stated Moana is "different" from other Disney characters since she was "truly described as a Disney heroine", being both "empowered and empowering" and not having a love interest. She compared her to Mulan since they were both "kick butt". Cravalho "thoroughly enjoyed and will always feel deeply connected to Moana and voicing her as the strong, independent, beautiful heroine that she is."

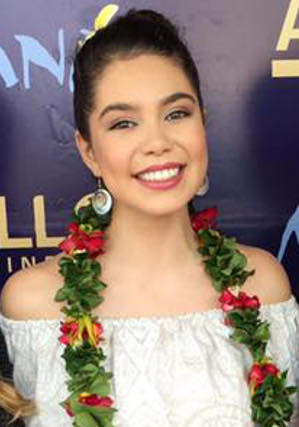
Moana is voiced by Hawaiian singer Auliʻi Cravalho in the English and Hawaiian versions of Moana (2016).

Since Cravalho had never done professional film work before, she was surprised about many things in the process. She recorded a line up to "30 or 40 times". She explained a different stress or emphasis on a particular word could create different emotions. 40 engineers would listen to her and listen to every grunt, voice change and volume change Cravalho made, listening for the exact emotion that they wanted to give in the film. Usually, the directors decided which take they would put in the final film. She also felt it was hard to be comfortable in the recording booth; usually, there were cameras for the animators to be able to add realistic facial expressions to the character. She was not sure how she should act while cameras were filming her recording her lines. When she sang, Cravalho needed the lights to be turned down. She asked for this since she did not want to feel like anybody was watching her since there were directors, animators, and writers watching her, sometimes sketching her and sometimes watching how she pronounced words. Cravalho was not used to the cameras and the "lights, camera, action" process and never recorded with co-stars Dwayne Johnson, Temuera Morrison, or Rachel House.

Cravalho reprised the role in 2017, dubbing the character again in the special Hawaiian-language dubbing of the movie. Cravalho reprised the role in Ralph Breaks the Internet where the character made a cameo appearance alongside the other Disney Princesses.

She reprised the role again by voicing Moana in Moana 2 in 2024. According to Cravalho, this was the first time "that a Disney princess has been allowed to age." Moana and Cravalho were both 16 when the first film came out, but within the sequel's narrative, only three years had elapsed, while the sequel was actually released eight years later. During those years, Cravalho had been asked to raise the pitch of her voice to sound like her former teenage self when recording lines for Disney fireworks shows, Disney on Ice, and Disney Lego Princess. She was delighted when the sequel's directors allowed her to record her lines using her natural voice as a woman in her early twenties.

==== International versions ====
When the movie had its first theatrical release worldwide, it numbered 45 versions overall, including a special Tahitian-language dubbing created specifically for the movie. In June 2017, a Māori-language version of the movie, featuring four voice-actors from the original English cast, was announced. Three weeks later, New Zealander Jaedyn Randell was introduced as Moana's voice. The movie was released in September 2017. In the same year, Shruti Rane (Hindi) reprised her role in the Bengali-language version of the movie. In November 2017, a Hawaiian-language dubbing was announced to be underway, with Auliʻi Cravalho reprising her role as Moana. The movie premiered on June 10, 2018.

In many European countries, Moana's name was changed to "Vaiana" due to a trademark conflict. The film was released in those countries to bear the alternative name in the title.

Highlighted versions were released later than 2016

Moana's dubbers worldwide
Language	Speaking	Singing	Name
Arabic	إلهام صبري (Ilham Sabry)	كارمن عصام سليمان (Carmen Essam Suleiman)	موانا (Moana)
Bengali	—N/a	श्रुति राणे (Shruti Rane)	মোয়ানা (Moana)
Bulgarian	Михаела Маринова (Mihaela Marinova)		Ваяна (Vaiana)
Cantonese	蘇麗珊 (So Lai Shan)		莫娜 (Moana)
Catalan	Cristal Barreyro	Ana Fernández Pellicer	Vaiana
Croatian	Mia Negovetić		Vaiana
Czech	Michaela Tomešová		Vaiana
Danish	Clara Rugaard		Vaiana
Dutch	Vajèn van den Bosch		Vaiana
English	Auliʻi Cravalho		Moana; Vaiana (Europe except the UK and Ireland) (Note: In most European countries where the movie was released with the character's name changed to "Vaiana", the English dubbing was also distributed with the alternative name)
Estonian	Emma Tross	Kelly Tulvik	Vaiana
Finnish	Yasmine Yamajako		Vaiana
Flemish	Laura Tesoro		Vaiana
French (Canada)	Cerise Calixte		Moana
French (Europe)	Cerise Calixte		Vaiana
German	Lina Larissa Strahl	Debby van Dooren	Vaiana
Greek	Μαρίνα Σάττι (Marína Sátti)		Βαϊάνα (Vaiana)
Hawaiian	Auliʻi Cravalho		Moana
Hebrew	משי קלינשטיין (Meshi Kleinstein)		מואנה (Moana)
Hindi	मुस्कान जाफरी (Muskkaan Jafri)	श्रुति राणे (Shruti Rane)	मोआना (Moana)
Hungarian	Faluvégi Fanni		Vaiana
Icelandic	Agla Bríet Einarsdóttir		Vaiana
Indonesian	Miranti Anna Juantara		Moana
Italian	Emanuela Ionica	Chiara Grispo	Vaiana
Japanese	屋比久知奈 (Tomona Yabiku)		モアナ (Moana)
Kazakh	Назерке Серікболова (Nazerke Serikbolova)		Моана (Moana)
Korean	김수연 (Kim Su-yeon)	김소향 (Kim So-Hyang)	모아나 (Moana)
Latvian	Vanda Siliņa		Vaiana
Lithuanian	Dorotėja Kravčenkaitė		Vaiana
Malay	Mae Elliessa		Moana
Mandarin Chinese (China)	刘美麟 (Liú Měi-Lín)		莫娜 (Moana)
Mandarin Chinese (Taiwan)	曾詩淳 (Céng Shī-Chún)	吳以悠 (Wú Yǐ-Yōu)	莫娜 (Moana)
Māori	Jaedyn Randell		Moana
Norwegian	Nora Gjestvang		Vaiana
Polish	Weronika Bochat		Vaiana
Portuguese (Brazil)	Any Gabrielly Ana Elena Bittecourt		Moana
Portuguese (Europe)	Luz Fonseca	Sara Madeira	Vaiana
Romanian	Ana Bianca Popescu		Vaiana
Russian	Зинаида Куприянович (Zinaida Kupriyanovich)		Моана (Moana)
Serbian	Ивона Рамбосек (Ivona Rambosek)		Вајана (Vaiana)
Slovak	Monika Potokárová		Vaiana
Slovene	Katja Ajster		Vaiana
Spanish (Europe)	Cristal Barreyro	María Parrado	Vaiana
Spanish (Latin America)	Sara Paula Gómez Arias		Moana
Swedish	Wiktoria Johansson		Vaiana
Tahitian	Sabrina Laughlin		Moana
Tamil	M. Haripriya		மோனா (Moana)
Thai	ไมร่า มณีภัสสร มอลลอย (Myra Molloy)		โมอาน่า (Moana)
Turkish	Ezgi Erol		Moana
Ukrainian	Маргарита Мелешко (Margarita Meleshko)		Ваяна (Vaiana)
Vietnamese	Trần Minh Như		Moana

=== Portrayal ===
In April 2023, it was announced that Walt Disney Pictures was developing a live-action film remake of Moana, executive produced by Auliʻi Cravalho, who would not reprise her role, but would be involved in the casting of her replacement. In July, casting for this replacement was paused due to the 2023 SAG-AFTRA strike.

=== Personality and design ===
Musker explained he and Clements invited a story without romance and alternatively have a focus on female empowerment with True Grit-quality: "the determined girl who teams up with a washed-up guy. They have this adventure and she finds her true calling—and saves the world in the process." He also said he appreciated the idea of an "action-adventure princess that could dive off cliffs and battle monsters". Shurer said, to make a female protagonist, they needed to "make her whole in and of herself". Furthermore, she said they wanted Moana to be self-assertive and have both compassion and courage to set her apart from other characters.

The creative team decided to create for Moana a realistic model with which girls could identify themselves, strong enough to be credible in activities, such as swimming, climbing a tree and jumping off a cliff. Shurer stated it was an "absolutely" conscious decision, further explaining that since they were writing a "hero's journey", she needed to be identifiable to all. Musker said this was intentional and partially prompted by hopes for her to be distinctive. Additionally, they aimed to create an experienced "action hero". The visual development drawings of the people of the South Pacific also had realistic bodies. Musker said it "seemed right" for her to have this body as Moana performed many stunts that require a lot of physicality. There were also women who worked on Moana who greatly hoped for her to have a realistic body.

To make the hair more realistic and expressive, a new program, Quicksilver, was created. Disney Elastic Rods was created to support twist for Moana's curly hair and the Multicurve for new twist information. To make the hair look realistic when wet, animators had models with similar hair to Moana's dunk their head in water. There were "collision driven hair rigs" which opened up "the possibilities of what the character's hair was able to do". Artistic direction and continuity was influenced by the freedom of motion, with most of the performance made through simulation. A new grab node was developed to help the curls of Moana's hair interact and collide. Various levels of wind were required for the character's hair since the film was set outside; as a result, the majority of the hair shots were the first time the Disney animators had animated such shots.

The costume designers wanted to make Moana's dress as authentic to her culture as possible. For example, the red color of Moana's dress was used to signify royalty at the time and since buttons did not exist, visual development artist Neysa Bové added a boar's tusk to keep the dress together. Bové stated Moana's top is made of mulberry while her skirt is made of pandanas. Bové added a slit at the front of Moana's dress so she could do the different activities she did in the film. She stated that with Moana, a large amount of research occurred at the Pacific Islands, where the film takes place. The film, however, was intended to be set 2,000 years before, making photo references impossible. Instead, they acquired material references from their Oceanic Trust. Much exploration was done for Moana's necklace, which is seen throughout most of the film.

We found this abalone shell. It's actually a mollusk, and you find this on all the Pacific Islands; it's something they use quite a bit. What's beautiful about it is that it sort of looks like a rock until you start scraping that away, and you reveal this beautiful abalone beneath it with all these ocean colors [...] I sort of added a curve to the shell and it's a nice juxtaposition between land and sea, and as a voyager she uses the stars to navigate, so I added some star carvings up on top of the shell.

— Bové, Disney Style

== Appearances ==
=== Films ===
==== Moana (2016) ====
Moana's grandmother, Tala, tells the story of Maui, the shape-shifting demigod of the wind and sea and master of sailing who stole goddess Te Fiti's heart. However, Te Fiti disintegrates, and Maui is attacked by Te Kā, a volcanic demon. His magical fishhook and Te Fiti's heart are lost in the ocean. The ocean then chooses Moana to return the heart to Te Fiti. Tui and Sina, Moana's parents, try to keep her away from the ocean to prepare her to become the island's chief. Sixteen years later, blight strikes her island and to attempt to prevent it, Moana suggests going beyond the reef which her father forbids her to. She tries with Pua the Pig but is overpowered by the waves and is shipwrecked back to shore. Tala shows Moana a secret cavern full of ships, revealing her ancestors were voyagers but stopped after Te Fiti's heart was stolen due to the ocean no longer being safe. She further explains Te Kā is causing the blight and she must seek Maui and the heart to stop it. On her deathbed, Tala convinces Moana to do so.

Setting sail on a camakau from the cavern, Moana is caught in a typhoon and shipwrecked on an island where she finds Maui, who boasts about his achievements. She demands that Maui return the heart, but he refuses and traps her in a cave. She escapes and confronts Maui who throws her off the boat multiple times but due to the ocean he reluctantly lets her onto the camakau. They are then attacked by Kakamora—coconut pirates—who, like other creatures, seek the heart. Moana and Maui escape them and Moana convinces Maui to help her by saying Maui is no longer a hero and should redeem himself by returning the heart. First, Moana and Maui must retrieve Maui's fishhook in Lalotai, the Realm of Monsters, from Tamatoa, a giant coconut crab. Maui takes his fishhook, only to find he does not have control over his shape-shifting anymore. Moana outwits Tamatoa and they escape. Maui reveals to Moana he became a demigod after his mortal parents abandoned him, the gods took pity on him and granted him powers. After Maui's confession, the two grow closer.

They are attacked by Te Kā after they arrive at Te Fiti's island. Moana refuses to turn back, resulting in Maui's hook being badly damaged. Unwilling to lose his hook in another confrontation, Maui abandons a tearful Moana who asks the ocean to find someone else to restore the heart and loses hope. The ocean obliges and takes the heart, Moana breaks down crying feeling hopeless but Tala's spirit appears, inspiring Moana to find her true calling. She retrieves the heart and sails back to confront Te Kā. Maui returns, having had a change of heart, and buys Moana time to reach Te Fiti by fighting Te Kā, destroying his hook in the process. Moana discovers Te Fiti is missing, and realizes Te Kā is Te Fiti, corrupted without her heart. Moana tells the ocean to clear a path, allowing her to return Te Fiti's heart, and the restored goddess heals the ocean and islands of the blight. Maui apologizes to Te Fiti, who restores his hook and gives Moana a new boat before falling into a deep sleep and becoming a mountain. Moana bids farewell to Te Fiti, returning home where she reunites with her parents and the rest of the villagers. Tui now accepts going past the reef, stating that it suits her. She then succeeds her father as the chief (Chiefess) and also becomes the wayfinder, leading her people as they resume voyaging.

==== Ralph Breaks the Internet (2018) ====
A "meta" version of the character appears with other Disney princesses and Elsa and Anna from Frozen (2013) in the Wreck-It Ralph (2012) sequel, Ralph Breaks the Internet (2018). When some of the princesses describe to Vanellope von Schweetz how they stare at "important water" to gain inspiration for their songs, Moana says she stares at the ocean. Later, when Ralph is falling from a tower and needs saving by the princesses, Moana causes water from a fountain to spiral upwards so that Elsa can freeze it into a slide to slow Ralph's fall, saying "You're Welcome" after saving him.

==== Moana 2 (2024) ====
In December 2020, it was announced that Moana would have a self-titled spin-off animated television series debuting on Disney+ in 2023. The show was later redeveloped into a feature film sequel, set for release in November 2024.

3 years after she returned Te Fiti's heart, Moana is now on the search for other people besides her island. She also has a younger sister named Simea who she adores. A visit from her ancestors tells her she must break the curse imposed by the power hungry god Nalo by bringing the island of Motufetu to reconnect the people. Due to the danger of the trip Moana recruits a crew to aid her. The craftswoman Loto, experienced elder farmer Kele, and historian and fanboy Moni. She desires to get Maui's aid but does not know how to call him.

Moana and her crew are attacked again by the Kakamora, but soon realize that the Kakamora seek the same goal they do. The Kakamora provide them with a weapon and assign a skilled coconut warrior, Kotu, to assist them. During the encounter, Moana becomes separated from her group and meets Matangi, a goddess who serves unwillingly as a companion to Nalo. Matangi agrees to help Moana, explaining that Nalo's defeat would free her from her confinement within a clam. She reveals that she has been holding Maui and brought him there to ensure that he and Moana would reunite, before sending them onward to their destination.

Nalo's sea monsters turn out to be almost too much for the crew and Moni almost dies. Moana is devastated and loses faith in herself, but Maui manages to inspire her. Together the crew face Nalo with the humans distracting Nalo so that Maui can raise the island. The plan goes astray so Moana dives in and successfully touches the sunken island, breaking the curse. However a lightning strike from Nalo kills her just after she succeeds. Maui and the ancestors (including her grandmother) revive Moana and turn her into a demigoddess herself. Maui raises the island and they finally meet other groups of people. Afterwards, the crew travels to explore the free ocean. Unknown to her, Nalo has captured Matangi and is planning his revenge against Moana, with Tamatoa offering to aid him on it.

==== Moana (2026) ====
In April 2023, it was announced that Walt Disney Pictures was developing a live-action film remake of Moana for a 2025 release, executive produced by Auliʻi Cravalho, who would not reprise her role, but would be involved in the casting of her replacement. In July, casting for this replacement was paused due to the 2023 SAG-AFTRA strike. Dwayne Johnson stated in February 2024 that an actress had been cast in the lead role but that it was intentionally being kept under wraps. Following the unveiling of Moana 2, the film was delayed to 2026. In June 2024, it was announced that newcomer Catherine Laga'aia from Sydney, Australia was cast as Moana.

Moana was released on July 10, 2026, coinciding with the 10th anniversary of the franchise and the release of the original film. The film was noted by critics to be a very close remake of the animated version, adding no new elements to the story or the character.

=== Television ===
==== Lego Disney Princess: The Castle Quest ====
Moana appears as one of the main characters in Lego's animated special Lego Disney Princess: The Castle Quest, released on Disney+ on August 18, 2023.

==== Lego Disney Princess: Villains Unite ====
Moana returns in the sequel special Lego Disney Princess: Villains Unite, released on Disney+ on August 25, 2025.

==== Sofia The First: Royal Magic ====
Moana will guest star in the series, with Auliʻi Cravalho reprising her role, with the series as a sequel to Sofia the First, entitled Sofia the First: Royal Magic. It will be the first time Moana and Sofia have interacted in a Disney series, with Moana providing "wisdom and guidance" to Sofia.

=== Merchandise ===
By 2019, Moana was inducted into the Disney Princess line-up, becoming the twelfth member of the media franchise, and toyline featuring female protagonists from various Disney animated films. In 2016, Disney released a Moana doll with sustainable packaging. On November 17, 2016, Disney released Moana: Rhythm Run, a premium mobile game as well as adding Moana content to Disney Stickers, Disney Crossy Road, Disney Emoji Blitz, Disney Story Central, and Disney Jigsaw Puzzles. On January 2, 2017, Disney released Moana: Island Life, a free-to-play mobile game.

==== Theme parks ====
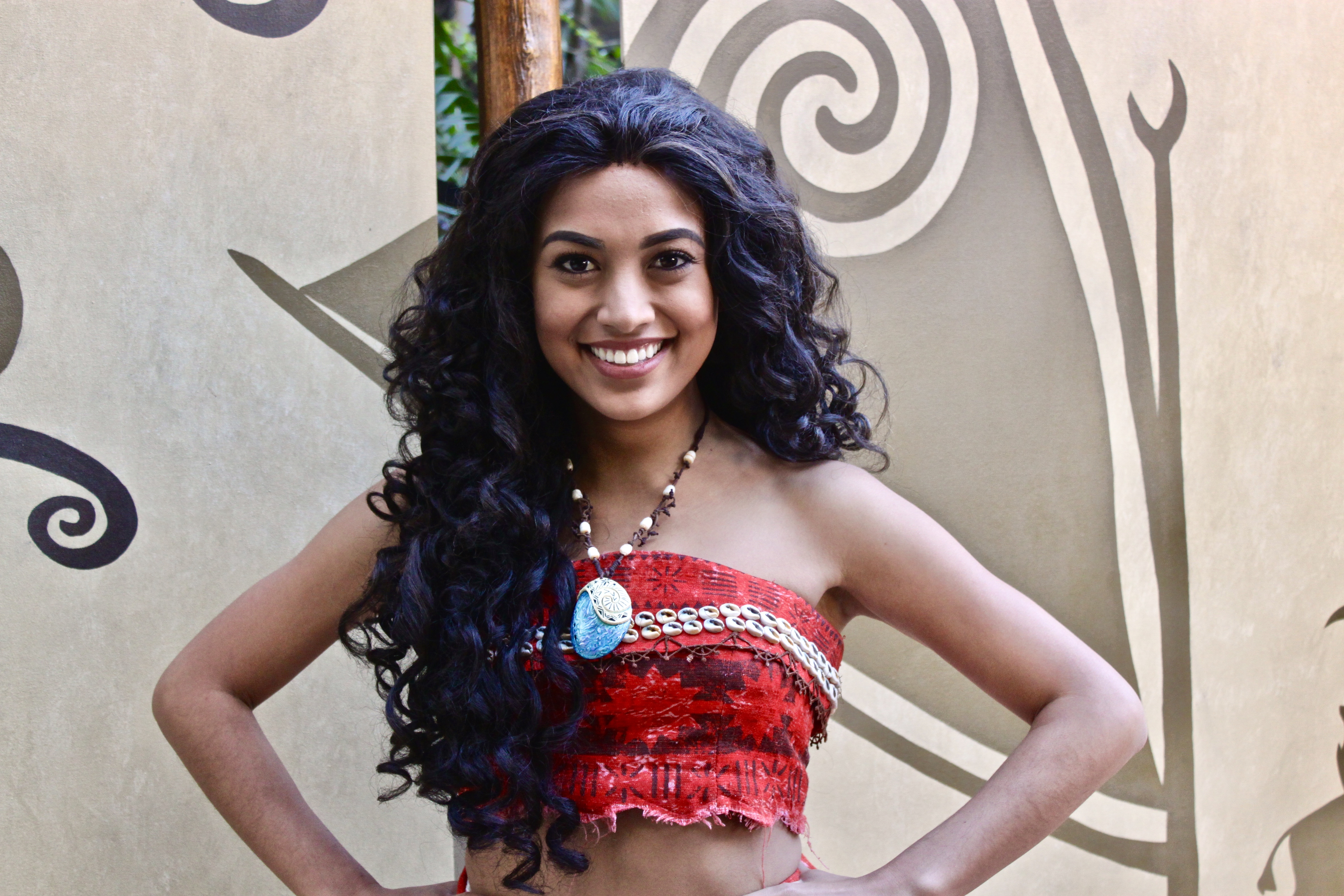
Moana, as she appears in the Disney Parks.

On November 16, 2016, prior to her film's release, Moana made her debut at Walt Disney World, doing meet-and-greets at Disney's Polynesian Resort. On November 18, 2016, Moana appeared in a surprise pre-parade of the Happy Birthday Mickey cavalcade in Disneyland Paris. On November 20, 2016, in Disneyland Paris, Moana began doing meet-and-greets at the Animation Station interactive post-show area of Art of Disney Animation. Since its debut on May 12, 2017, Moana appeared in Happily Ever After in Magic Kingdom, singing "How Far I'll Go". After Tokyo Disneyland's refurbishment of "It's A Small World", Moana and Pua were featured in the Polynesian scene. Since the stage show's opening on May 25, 2018, Moana performed in Moana: A Homecoming Celebration in Hong Kong Disneyland. Moana has also appeared in Summer Blast in Shanghai Disneyland since 2019. Since its opening on October 16, 2023, the day of the 100th anniversary of the Walt Disney company, Moana appeared in a new meet-and-greet location called Character Greetings, right located in next door to Journey of Water Pavilion in World Nature neighborhoods at EPCOT.

== Reception ==
=== Critical reviews ===
"She chooses to be a forward-thinking leader of her people on her own terms, rather than a stereotypical princess in need of rescue, which the film acknowledges in amusingly knowing fashion. She has both the wisdom to respect her people's traditions and the bravery to blaze her own trail toward the future."
—Christy Lemire, RogerEbert.com film critic

The Verge stated that Moana is a fully-rounded character with a believable, while still idealized body. They also praised her resourcefulness and the fact she does not end up partnered at the end of the film. IGN conveyed that she is a wonderful role model for her perseverance and courage. Victoria McNally states that she is the most revolutionary Disney Princess by not having a love interest, being a good leader, and embracing her culture. A. O. Scott of The New York Times said Moana was "inspiring" due to her smartness, bravery and decency. The fact Moana did not aim to meet a prince was praised by Firstpost. Plugged In writer Bob Hoose lauded Moana's focus, determination, and the fact she was able to face death to fix the wrongs of the past. The Times of India wrote "she also conquers your heart. You won't regret setting sail and voyaging with her." The Guardian commended Moana since she cared about nature and was willing to face the challenges of the future. Variety described her as "one of Disney's most remarkable heroines yet" since she did not await a prince and took control of her own destiny. The Stanford Daily praised Moana's development and her "human traits" which were not present in previous Disney Princesses.

Cravalho was also praised for her voice acting and singing. Screen Rant called her performance "lively and charismatic". Common Sense Media stated Cravalho and Johnson shared a "refreshingly student-and-mentor-like chemistry". Firstpost said she was going to be a "huge star" in the future and felt her "insane" singing range was one of the most surprising things in the film. Rolling Stone described Cravalho's performance as sassy. The Guardian and Radio Times felt Cravalho's voice acting and singing were beautiful. RogerEbert.com said Cravalho showed skills beyond her age and praised her grace, timing and energy. Flixist wrote Cravalho was an "absolute delight". The New Zealand Herald compared her voice acting to that of Mickey Mouse Club. The Hollywood Reporter was impressed by Cravalho's voice acting and complimented her singing range. Entertainment Weekly wrote Cravalho "show[ed] off her pipes" during Moana's "I Want" song "How Far I'll Go".

The character has not been without criticism, however. ScreenCrush said it was "not impossible" to criticize Moana's "underwhelming qualities". Film Inquiry felt Moana lacked originality and unpredictability in her arc, calling her a "carbon copy of every other Disney Princess". Similarly, Den of Geek found it unfortunate that Moana was an "inversion" of Ariel from The Little Mermaid.

=== Accolades ===
Moana received a nomination for Best Animated Female from the Alliance of Women Film Journalists, tying for the award with Judy Hopps from Zootopia. Additionally, Moana and Maui were nominated for Favourite Frenemies at the 2017 Kids' Choice Awards, losing the award to characters from Zootopia. Cravalho has also received and been nominated for several other awards including winning an Annie Award for Outstanding Voice Acting and a Kids' Choice Award for Favorite Female Voice from an Animated Movie as well as being nominated for two Teen Choice Awards, winning one for Choice Breakout Movie Actress.
