= Catherine Laga'aia =

Australian actress and musician (born 2006)

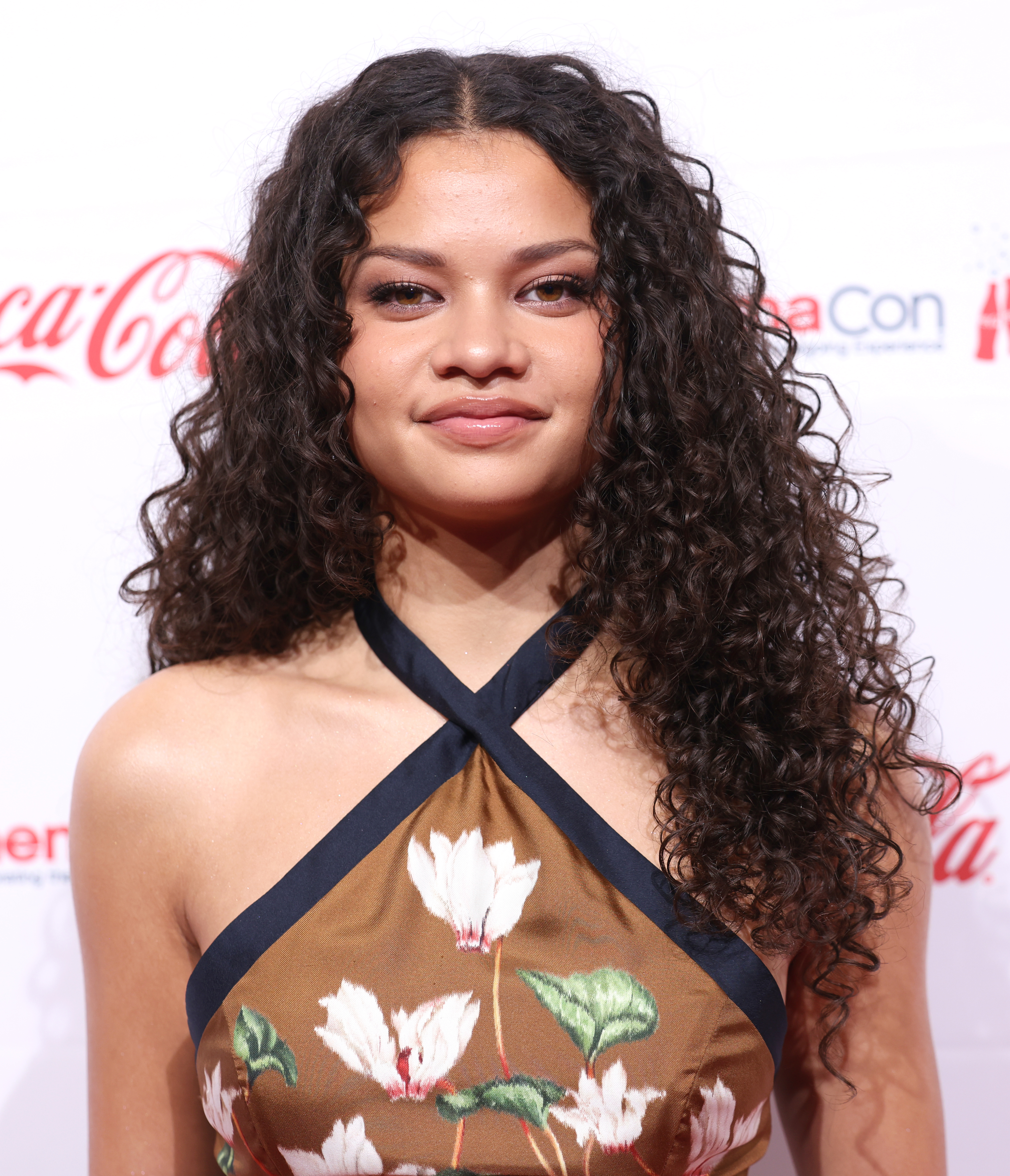
- Laga'aia in 2026
- Born: Catherine Laga'aia; 17 December 2006 (age 19); Sydney, New South Wales, Australia
- Occupations: Actress; singer
- Years active: 2023–present
- Father: Jay Laga'aia

Catherine "Katie" Laga'aia (born 17 December 2006) is an Australian actress and singer. Her film debut was the title role of the live-action film Moana (2026).

== Early life ==
Laga'aia was born on 17 December 2006 in Sydney, New South Wales, Australia, to actor Jay Laga'aia and his wife Sandra Jane. She has seven siblings and is of Samoan and English descent. Her grandparents are from Savai'i and Upolu in Samoa. She grew up in the inner west of Sydney as part of a theatrical family, being one of eight children. Five of her siblings have also pursued careers in the performing arts.

Laga'aia attended Newtown High School of the Performing Arts and graduated in 2024. In 2025, Laga'aia graduated from the National Institute of Dramatic Art with a Diploma of Stage and Screen Performance.

== Career ==
Laga'aia made her screen debut in the television series The Lost Flowers of Alice Hart (2023), appearing as a younger version of the character Candy. In June 2024, Laga'aia was cast in the title role of Disney's 2026 film Moana, opposite Dwayne Johnson. Laga'aia was selected from over 32,000 international applicants to star as Moana in Disney's live-action adaptation. Laga'aia's sisters Isabella and Georgia also applied and sent tapes in for the auditions. Prior to her casting, she had primarily focused on straight acting. Her mother encouraged her to audition, which led to a screen test in New York where she was directed by Thomas Kail.

Production involved a seven-month schedule that required Laga'aia to balance her Year 12 HSC assessments and examinations. As Laga'aia was still a student when cast as Moana, she finished her classwork remotely so she could still sit her HSC. One of Laga'aia's teachers, Mr. Kavanagh, stated: "We had her emailing assessment tasks and exams back and forth from the set of Moana, to ensure that she was able to complete her HSC while filming." During the production of Moana, Laga'aia completed her final secondary school assessments on location, taking her English examination in front of a mirror on the first day of filming. She finished her final examinations in a trailer in Los Angeles with her on-set tutor's golden retriever by her side. While studying she occasionally confused math equations with her script lines.

While Moana (2026) received an unfavorable critical response, Laga'aia received praise for her performance. In Fortress of Solitude magazine, Casey Chong wrote: "Catherine Laga’aia brings a grounded yet feisty charm to her titular character [and] pairs well with Dwayne Johnson." Marshall Shaffer of The Playlist stated that "the closest thing this Moana offers to reality is Catherine Lagaʻaia, the actress making her screen debut in the titular role. She manages to embody both the wisdom of an emerging tribal leader and the impetuousness of a teenager with some attitude."

Laga'aia has been cast in the upcoming Australian thriller film Crashout, directed by Nick Annas, and the Disney+ pilot Spaceship Earth.

== Filmography ==
=== Film ===
Key
†	Denotes films that have not yet been released

Year	Title	Role	Notes
2026	Moana	Moana	also contributed to the film's soundtrack
TBA	Crashout †	Riley	Filming

=== Television ===
Key
†	Denotes television productions that have not yet been released

Year	Title	Role	Notes
2023	The Lost Flowers of Alice Hart	Young Candy	3 episodes
