= Aaron and Jordan Kandell =

American screenwriters and journalists

Aaron and Jordan Kandell (both born June 16, 1982) are identical twin American screenwriters and journalists. They were born and raised in Honolulu, Hawaii, and studied film and creative writing at the University of Southern California. They have written numerous original feature film and television projects for Fox Animation, Disney Animation, Warner Brothers Pictures, 20th Century Fox, Legendary and Paramount Pictures. The Kandell brothers were on the 2013 Young and Hungry List and their screenplay The Golden Record was on the 2013 Black List. They also served as screenwriters on Disney Animation's Moana.

The Kandells wrote the spec script that was turned into the film Adrift (2018), directed by Baltasar Kormákur and starring Shailene Woodley.

== Films ==
- Happiest Man Alive (2010), writers
- Moana (2016), writers for Disney Animation
- Adrift (2018), writers (also producers)
- Untitled Fox Animation Project (in development), writers for Fox Animation
- Sidekicks (in development), writers for Paramount Pictures
- Supernormal (in development), writers for Netflix
- The Golden Record (in development), writers for Endgame Entertainment
- Stranded (in development)
- Conviction (in development), producing with Malpaso Productions for Warner Bros.

=== Television ===
- Swift Harding (in development)
- Capitol (in development)
