= Auliʻi Cravalho =

American actress and singer (born 2000)

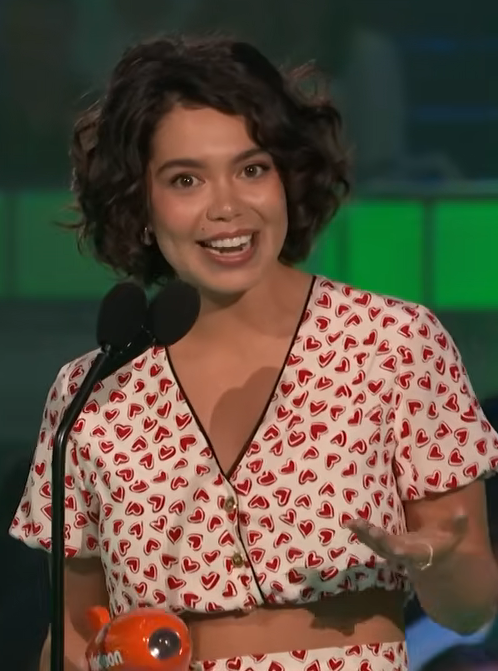
- Cravalho in 2025
- Born: Chloe Auliʻi Cravalho; November 22, 2000 (age 25); Kohala, Hawaii, U.S.
- Occupations: Actress, singer
- Years active: 2016–present

Chloe Auliʻi Cravalho (/aʊˈliːʔi krəˈvɑːljoʊ/; born November 22, 2000) is an American actress and singer. She made her acting debut as the voice of the title character in the Disney animated musical film Moana (2016) and reprised her role in the 2024 sequel.

Cravalho has had leading roles in the drama series Rise (2018), the drama film All Together Now (2020), the supernatural comedy Darby and the Dead (2022), Crush (2022), the sci-fi series The Power (2023), and the 2024 film adaptation of Mean Girls: The Musical. She has also acted in several theatrical productions, including Evita (2023) in London and Cabaret (2024) on Broadway.

== Early life and education ==
Cravalho was born in Kohala, Hawaii, and is of Chinese, Native Hawaiian, Puerto Rican, Portuguese, and Irish descent. Her parents Dwayne and Puanani "ran a construction company and divorced when she was young". At the time she made her breakthrough, she was living in Mililani, Hawaii, with her mother and was in her first year of high school, singing soprano in the glee club at Kamehameha Schools' Kapālama campus. She grew up with her mother in a one-bedroom apartment, and they had to rely on the federal food stamps program for support. Following the success of Moana, she bought a house for her mother.

In June 2021, Cravalho announced that she had been accepted into Columbia University and subsequently revealed that she planned to major in environmental science. However, she repeatedly deferred her entrance to Columbia in order to focus on acting to the point where she would have to reapply for admission to study there.

== Career ==
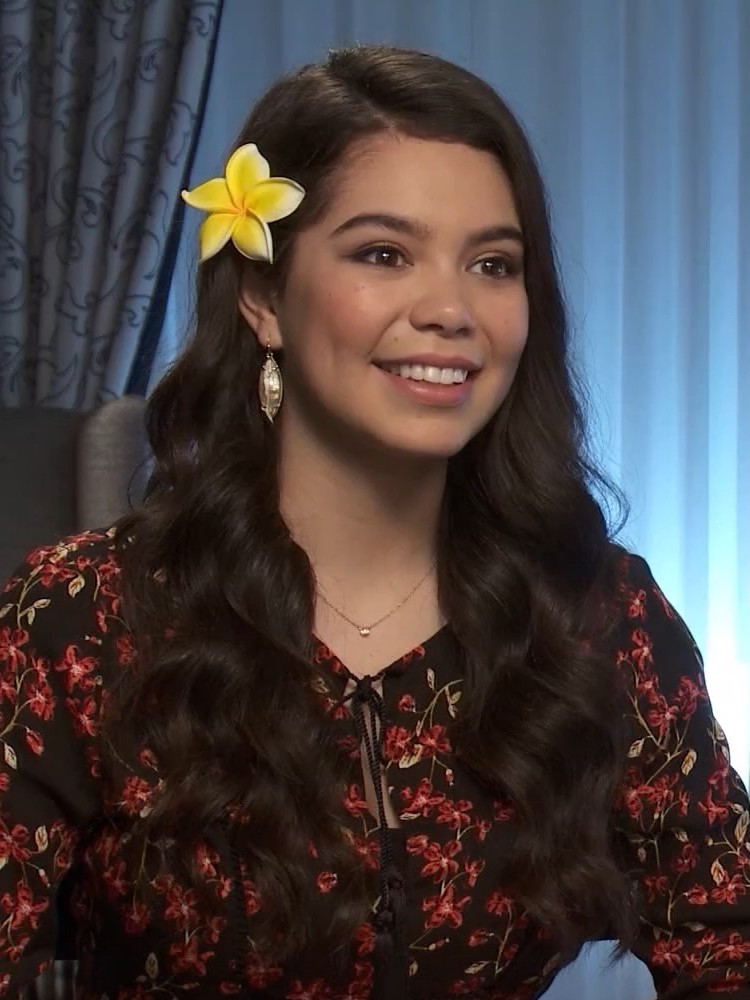
Cravalho in 2017

As a 14-year-old high school freshman, Cravalho was cast as the title character in the 2016 animated movie Moana. She has stated that she was initially not going to audition for the role because "there were already so many great submissions that [she] didn't think [she] needed to try out". However, a talent agent in Oʻahu discovered her through a charity video contest and brought her to Los Angeles to audition for the role. Casting director Rachel Sutton has stated that Cravalho was the last person to audition out of hundreds of actresses.

In February 2017, it was announced that she had been cast in the pilot for the NBC drama Rise, which was ordered to series on May 4, 2017. The series premiered on March 13, 2018, but NBC cancelled the series on May 15, 2018, due to low ratings. In May 2017, she sang the national anthem at the National Memorial Day Concert. In November 2017, Cravalho announced she was going to reprise her role as Moana in the first Hawaiian language–dubbed Disney film. The dubbed Moana premiered on June 10, 2018.

On November 5, 2019, Cravalho portrayed Ariel in ABC's The Little Mermaid Live!, a live-action concert rendition of The Little Mermaid. In 2020, she starred in All Together Now, directed by Brett Haley for Netflix. Cravalho has twice performed as guest narrator at Disney's Candlelight Processional at Walt Disney World, in 2018 and 2021.

In 2020, Cravalho participated in Acting for a Cause, a live classic play and screenplay reading series created, directed and produced by Brando Crawford. Cravalho played Gwendolen Fairfax in The Importance of Being Earnest, Laertes in Hamlet, Lady Catherine in Pride and Prejudice, and Jeannie Bueller in Ferris Bueller's Day Off. The reading raised funds for non-profit charities including Mount Sinai Medical Center.

On November 18, 2021, it was announced that Cravalho would voice the title character, Hailey, in the animated comedy-adventure series Hailey's On It!, which premiered on June 8, 2023, on Disney Channel. She also has a role in the sci-fi drama series The Power, where she plays Jos Cleary-Lopez, a teenager who develops electric powers, and as Janis ʻImiʻike in Mean Girls, a 2024 film adaptation of the stage musical Mean Girls.

In 2023, it was announced that Cravalho would be an executive producer on the upcoming live-action adaptation of Moana but would not reprise the titular role. She stated in 2024 that "it feels really important to me to pass the baton to the next young woman of Pacific Island descent".

In July 2024, it was announced that Cravalho will take over the role of Sally Bowles in the Broadway production of Cabaret beginning September 16. She had a brief voice role as a talking anti-venom pen in the 2025 film Zootopia 2.

In April 2026, it was announced that Cravalho would guest-star in Sofia the First: Royal Magic, a sequel to Sofia the First, as Moana, reprising her voice role. It will be the first time Moana and Sofia have interacted in a Disney series, with Moana providing "wisdom and guidance" to Sofia.

== Personal life ==
In April 2020, Cravalho came out as bisexual. In January 2024, she revealed that she has Ehlers–Danlos syndrome. Cravalho is a fan of the Buffalo Bills National Football League team and sang "The Star-Spangled Banner" for the first regular season home opener at Highmark Stadium.

== Filmography ==
=== Film ===
List of Auliʻi Cravalho film appearances
Year	Title	Role	Notes
2016	Moana	Moana (voice)	
2018	Ralph Breaks the Internet	Moana (voice)	
2020	All Together Now	Amber Appleton	
2022	Crush	AJ Campos	
2022	Darby and the Dead	Capri Donahue	
2023	Once Upon a Studio	Moana (voice)	Short film
2024	Mean Girls	Janis ʻImiʻike	
2024	Moana 2	Moana (voice)	Also contributed to film's soundtrack
2025	Reef Builders	Herself	Documentary
2025	Zootopia 2	Anti-Venom Pen (voice)	Cameo
2026	Moana	—	Executive producer
2027	Monkey Quest †	Elle (voice)	In production

=== Television ===
List of Auliʻi Cravalho television appearances
Year	Title	Role	Notes
2018	Rise	Lilette Suarez	Main role
2019	Weird City	Rayna Perez	Episode: "Go to College"
2019	The Little Mermaid Live!	Ariel	Television special
2019	Elena of Avalor	Veronica (voice)	Episode: "The Last Laugh"
2022	Harmonious Live!	Narrator	Television special
2022	Maui Shark Mystery	Narrator	Main role
2023	The Power	Jos Cleary-Lopez	Main role
2023	Lego Disney Princess: The Castle Quest	Moana (voice)	Television special
2023–2024	Hailey's On It!	Hailey Banks (voice)	Main role
2023–2024	Hailey's On It!	Kelci Fyre (voice)	Episode: "An Imposter Is Born"
2024–2025	Chibiverse	Hailey Banks, Scientist #5 (voice)	2 episodes
2024	Hailey Banks' Disney Mini Movie Marathon	Hailey Banks (voice)	Television special
2024	Krapopolis	Muses (voice)	Episode: "Muse Your Illusion"
2024	The Tiny Chef Show	Herself	Episode: "Poi"
2025	Lulu Is a Rhinoceros	Lulu (voice)	Television special
2025	Lego Disney Princess: Villains Unite	Moana (voice)	Television special
2025	The Mighty Nein	Toya (voice)	2 episodes
2026	My Adventures with Superman	Jessica Cruz (voice)	Episode: "Mobile Suit Toyman"
2026	Lego Disney Princess: Magical Mayhem	Moana (voice)	Television special
2026	Sofia the First: Royal Magic	Moana (voice)	Guest role
TBA	My Adventures with Green Lantern	Jessica Cruz (voice)	Main role

=== Video games ===
List of Auliʻi Cravalho video game roles
Year	Title	Role
2019	The Sims 4	Nalani Mahiʻai (voice)
2023	Disney Dreamlight Valley	Moana (voice)
2025	Disney Speedstorm	Moana (voice)
TBA	Ark 2	Meeka (voice)

=== Web ===
Year	Title	Role	Notes
2020	Acting for a Cause	Jeannie Bueller, Lady Catherine, Laertes, Gwendolen	4 episodes
2023	Theme Song Takeover	Hailey Banks (voice)	3 episodes
2023	Broken Karaoke	Hailey Banks (voice)	1 episode
2024	Hailey's On It!: Road Trip	Hailey Banks (voice)	Short series

=== Stage ===
List of Auliʻi Cravalho stage performances
Year	Title	Role	Venue	Notes
2018	Have a Nice Day	Teenage daughter	Minetta Lane Theatre	Off-Broadway live reading
2019	The Little Mermaid	Ariel	Walt Disney Studios	Concert
2023	Sunset Boulevard	Betty Schaefer	Eisenhower Theater, Kennedy Center	Regional
2023	Evita	Eva Perón	LW Theatres, Drury Lane	West End
2024	Children of Eden	Yonah	David Geffen Hall, Lincoln Center	Concert
2024–2025	Cabaret	Sally Bowles (replacement)	August Wilson Theatre	Broadway

=== Music videos ===
List of Auliʻi Cravalho music videos
Year	Title	Role	Notes
2018	Live Your Story	Herself	Music video for Walt Disney Records

== Awards and nominations ==
Year	Award	Category	Nominated work	Result	Ref.
2016	Indiana Film Journalists Association	Best Vocal/Motion Capture Performance	Moana	Nominated	
2016	Washington D.C. Area Film Critics Association	Best Voice Performance	Moana	Nominated	
2017	Alliance of Women Film Journalists	Best Animated Female	Moana	Won (Note: Tied with Ginnifer Goodwin for Zootopia (2016))	
2017	Annie Awards	Outstanding Voice Acting in an Animated Feature Production	Moana	Won (Note: Tied with Jason Bateman for Zootopia (2016))	
2017	BTVA Feature Film Voice Acting Award	Best Female Lead Vocal Performance in a Feature Film	Moana	Won	
2017	BTVA Feature Film Voice Acting Award	Best Vocal Ensemble in a Feature Film (shared with the cast of Moana)	Moana	Nominated	
2017	BTVA People's Choice Voice Acting Award	Best Female Lead Vocal Performance in a Feature Film	Moana	Won	
2017	BTVA People's Choice Voice Acting Award	Best Vocal Ensemble in a Feature Film (shared with the cast of Moana)	Moana	Won	
2017	BTVA People's Choice Voice Acting Award	Breakthrough Voice Actress of the Year	Moana	Won	
2017	BTVA Voice Acting Award	Breakthrough Voice Actress of the Year	Moana	Nominated	
2017	Kids' Choice Awards	Favorite Frenemies (with Dwayne Johnson)	Moana	Nominated	
2017	MTV Movie + TV Awards	Best Musical Moment	Moana	Nominated	
2017	Teen Choice Awards	Choice Movie: Breakout Star	Moana	Won	
2017	Teen Choice Awards	Choice Movie: Fantasy Actress	Moana	Nominated	
2017	Young Artist Awards	Best Performance in a Voice-Over Role - Teen Actress	Moana	Nominated	
2017	World Soundtrack Awards	Best Original Song Written Directly for a Film (with Lin-Manuel Miranda)	Moana	Nominated	
2018	National Film and Television Award	Best Newcomer	Moana	Nominated	
2025	Washington D.C. Area Film Critics Association	Best Voice Performance	Moana 2	Nominated	
2025	Kids' Choice Awards	Favorite Female Voice From An Animated Movie	Moana 2	Won	
2025	Broadway.com Audience Choice Awards	Favorite Replacement (Female)	Cabaret at the Kit Kat Club	Nominated	
