= Moana (2026 soundtrack) =

2026 film soundtrack album

Moana (Original Motion Picture Soundtrack)

Soundtrack album by various artists
- Released: June 26, 2026
- Length: 30:02
- Label: Walt Disney
- Producers: Lin-Manuel Miranda; Mark Mancina; Opetaia Foaʻi

Lin-Manuel Miranda chronology
Mufasa: The Lion King (2024)	Moana (Original Motion Picture Soundtrack) (2026)

Mark Mancina chronology
Moana 2 (2024)	Moana (2026)

Moana (Original Motion Picture Soundtrack) is the soundtrack album to the 2026 musical adventure film Moana directed by Thomas Kail which is the live-action adaptation of Disney Animation's 2016 film and the overall third installment and first live-action film in the Moana franchise; it featured Catherine Laga'aia playing the title character while Dwayne Johnson reprises his role as Maui from the animated films. The soundtrack was released through Walt Disney Records on June 26, 2026, two weeks prior to the film's release and featured songs composed and produced by Mark Mancina, Lin-Manuel Miranda and Opetaia Foaʻi, all reprising their roles from their contribution to the animated film as songwriter, composer and producer. The soundtrack incorporates and remakes the songs featured in the animated film. A deluxe edition of the album was released on July 8, 2026, featuring Mancina's score and instrumental versions of the songs.

== Background ==
Lin-Manuel Miranda, Mark Mancina and Opetaia Foaʻi, who all had contributed to the soundtrack to the animated film, returned for the live-action adaptation. All of them had been a key contributors in shaping the musical identity for Moana, and part of the previous animated films, except Miranda who was not involved in Moana 2 (2024) owing to his commitments with Mufasa: The Lion King; Abigail Barlow and Emily Bear contributed to the songs in Moana 2. Miranda wrote a new version of the song, "Along the Way" which had Auliʻi Cravalho—who portrayed the titular character in the animated film—alongside Laga'aia and Johnson performing the song; it was featured in the film's end credits. Miranda said that, "We've got the only two women in the world who know what it feels like to play Moana. It's this mix of... I've been there before and you're going to be fine. To musicalise that as a conversation between two sisters was really special."

Like the previous films, Miranda and Op. Foaʻi emphasized on using Polynesian languages to authentically showcase the Pacific Island culture through music. The band Te Vaka was also involved in the score, recording vocals, chants and drums. The band recorded their contributions for Moana within a week, which Op. Foaʻi considered it to be "exciting" and being proud on introducing Pacific culture to the world and inspiring millions through music.

== Release ==
The soundtrack was preceded by "Along the Way" as the lead single on June 15, 2026. The standard edition of the album, featuring 13 tracks, was released digitally on June 26, two weeks prior to the film's release. An accompanying deluxe edition album, featuring Mancina's score and instrumental versions of the original songs, were released on July 8. Mancina's score was separately released, two days later, while the CD and LP formats of the score and songs were also made available on the same date. The vinyl editions consisted of a black standard vinyl LP and a "liquid filled" sea-blue colored vinyl LP.

== Reception ==
Filmtracks wrote "Don't be surprised if the 2026 version of Moana elicits the exact same reaction as 2019's The Lion King. There's nothing offensive about it, aside from its existence and a constant, nagging feeling that it's not as satisfying as the original."

== Track listing ==
Moana (Original Motion Picture Soundtrack)
No.	Title	Writer(s)	Producer(s)	Length
1.	"Tulou Tagaloa" (performed by Matatia Foaʻi, Olivia Foaʻi, and Opetaia Foaʻi)	Opetaia Foa'i	Mark Mancina; Op. Foaʻi	0:49
2.	"An Innocent Warrior" (performed by Olivia Foaʻi and Sulata Foaʻi-Amiatu)	Op. Foaʻi	Op. Foaʻi	1:44
3.	"Where You Are" (performed by Amaya Masoli, Catherine Laga'aia, Emma Puahi-Shapazian, Frankie Adams, John Tui, Rena Owen, and Te Vaka)	Mancina; Op. Foaʻi; Lin-Manuel Miranda	Mancina; Miranda; Op. Foaʻi; Alex Lacamoire^{[a]}	3:41
4.	"How Far I'll Go" (performed by Catherine Laga'aia)	Miranda	Mancina; Miranda	2:51
5.	"We Know the Way" (performed by Moses Mackay, Opetaia Foaʻi, and Te Vaka)	Miranda; Op. Foaʻi	Mancina; Miranda; Op. Foaʻi; Lacamoire^{[a]}	2:20
6.	"How Far I'll Go" (reprise) (performed by Catherine Laga'aia)	Mancina; Miranda	Mancina; Miranda; Lacamoire^{[a]}	1:25
7.	"You're Welcome" (performed by Dwayne Johnson)	Miranda	Mancina; Miranda; Op. Foaʻi; Lacamoire^{[a]}	2:47
8.	"Shiny" (performed by Jemaine Clement)	Mancina; Miranda	Mancina; Miranda; Lacamoire^{[a]}	3:04
9.	"Along the Way (Malaga Ki Ei)" (performed by Olivia Foaʻi, Sulata Foaʻi-Amiaitu, and Te Vaka)	Mancina; Miranda; Op. Foaʻi	Mancina; Miranda; Op. Foaʻi	1:42
10.	"I Am Moana (Song of the Ancestors)" (performed by Catherine Laga'aia and Rena Owen)	Mancina; Miranda; Op. Foaʻi	Mancina; Miranda; Op. Foaʻi; Lacamoire^{[a]}	2:42
11.	"Know Who You Are" (performed by Catherine Laga'aia, Matthew Ineleo, Olivia Foaʻi, Opetaia Foaʻi, and Sulata Foaʻi-Amiatu)	Mancina; Miranda; Op. Foaʻi	Mancina; Miranda; Lacamoire^{[a]}	1:24
12.	"We Know the Way (Finale)" (performed by Catherine Laga'aia, Frankie Adams, John Tui, and Te Vaka)	Miranda; Op. Foaʻi	Mancina; Miranda; Op. Foaʻi; Lacamoire^{[a]}	1:10
13.	"Along the Way" (performed by Auliʻi Cravalho, Catherine Laga'aia, and Dwayne Johnson)	Miranda	Mancina; Miranda; Kurt Crowley^{[a]}	4:17
Total length:				30:02

Notes

- ^{^[a]} Vocal producer

== Moana: Voices Across the Ocean ==
Moana: Voices Across the Ocean (Music Inspired By)

Compilation album by various artists
- Released: July 31, 2026
- Length: 51:46
- Label: Walt Disney
- Producers: Dwayne Johnson; Lauren Hashian

Moana: Voices Across the Ocean is a companion album inspired by the film and its songs, that featured vocal performances by Pacific Island artists. It was executive produced by Johnson and his wife Lauren Hashian. The album was released on July 31, and featured 15 tracks, one of which included a new version of "We Know the Way".

Track listing
No.	Title	Writer(s)	Producer(s)	Length
1.	"We Know The Way" (performed by Dinah Jane and Stan Walker)	Op. Foa'i; Miranda	Matt Sadgrove	3:11
2.	"Toloa (Those Who Love You)" (performed by Fia)	Eric Zayne; Lauren Hashian; Nazerine Henderson; Fiavaai Desmond Esene; Isaiah Fa’alogo Mauga	Eric Zayne	4:00
3.	"Natural" (performed by Becca Hatch)	Willie Tafa; Rebecca Natalie Hatch; Milan Ring; Jamie Jonathon Santos Muscat	Willstah; Chunkyluv	3:12
4.	"Omai" (performed by DJ Noiz, Kennyon Brown and Donell Lewis)	Kennyon TJ Howard Niu Brown; Faasalafa Zion Tootoo Opapo; Donnelley Jade Thomas Lewis	DJ Noiz	3:26
5.	"Island Queen" (performed by Spawnbreezie and Tenelle)	Anapogi Fau; Tenelle Christine Luafalemana; Chaz Mark Toney	Chaz "Rox" Toney	3:13
6.	"Strength Of A Woman" (performed by Dinah Jane)	Dinah Jane; Ljay Currie; Benjamin Workman; Regina Rochelle Hansen	Ljay Currie; TrapMoneyBenny	2:52
7.	"Be" (performed by Aaradhna)	Aaradhna Patel; Leonardo Coghini	Aaradhna Patel	2:28
8.	"In The Waves" (performed by Iam Tongi and Paula Fuga)	Paula Fuga; William Tongi	Iam Tongi	3:39
9.	"Your Dad" (performed by Dwayne Johnson)	Dwayne Johnson; William Tongi; Johnny Reid	Iam Tongi	3:42
10.	"Reflections Of Me" (performed by Common Kings)	Dominic Jordan; Jimmy Giannos; Sasualei Maliga; Lui Kirimaua; Jerome Taito; Tautua Reed; Taumata Grey; Jason Boyd	The Audibles; Dominic Jordan; Jimmy Giannos	3:38
11.	"Two Of Us" (performed by Josh Tatofi and Keilana)	Josh Tatofi; Eric Zayne; Lauren Hashian	Josh Tatofi; Kapena De Lima; Eric Zayne	3:44
12.	"Deep End" (performed by Fatai and Sammy Johnson)	Fatai Veamatahau; Samuel Hone Taylor Johnson	Nick Monson; Mark Nilan Jr.	3:51
13.	"Golden Days" (performed by Maoli)	Glenn Awong; Emily Falvey; Fraser Churchill	Eric Zayne	3:35
14.	"Family Tree" (performed by Stan Walker)	Stan Walker; Billy Davis; Benny Morrell; Mohamed Komba	Matt Sadgrove	3:12
15.	"TĀTOU" (performed by Tiana Nonosina Liufau, MEVINA, Rex Atirai, Afatia Thompson, Chesser Cowan and Kaumakaiwa Kanaka'Ole)	Tiana Nonosina Liufau; Rex Atirai; Afatia Thompson; Chesser Cowan; Kaumakaiwa Kanaka'Ole; Kayla Fa'amaligi; Mike Zombie; Lauren Hashian; Mevina Liufau; Hinatea Colombani; Adam Kobylarz; Dru De Caro	Tiana Nonosina Liufau; Kayla Fa'amaligi; Mike Zombie	4:03
Total length:				51:46

== Personnel ==
These credits have been adapted from various music streaming services.

- Original songs written and composed by: Lin-Manuel Miranda, Opetaia Foaʻi, Mark Mancina
- Original score composed by: Mark Mancina
- Original songs produced by: Mark Mancina, Lin-Manuel Miranda, Opetaia Foaʻi
- Songs and score recorded and mixed by: David Boucher
- Original song vocals produced and supervised by: Alex Lacamoire
- "Along the Way" produced by: Mark Mancina, Lin-Manuel Miranda
- Original score produced and additional music by: Marlon E. Espino
- "Along the Way" vocals produced by: Kurt Crowley
- Supervising music editor: Jennifer Dunnington
- Music editor: Tim Marchiafava
- Score music editor: Sebastian Zuleta
- Assistant music editor: Khai McAllister
- Song orchestrations by: Dave Metzger
- Score orchestrations by: Larry Rench
- Orchestra conducted by: Pete Anthony, Don Harper
- Additional score orchestrations by: Steven Rader, Tyler Rydosz, Penka Kouneva
- MIDI programming: Eduardo Diez, Jake Monaco
- Music contractor: Peter Rotter for Encompass Music Partners
- Te Vaka music contractor: Julie Foa
- Vocal consultant: Jasper Randall
- Cast vocal coach: Peter Rutherford
- Additional vocal contractor: Sandra Park
- Score choir leader and arranger: Kale Chang
- Choir production support: Andrew Page
- Vocal contracting administration:
- Supervising copyist: Booker White
- Music librarian: Nicholas Cazares
- Music preparation: Chris Anderson-Bazzoli, Brandon Bailo, Lisa Bennett, Joshua Britt, Jackie Burrell, Leslie Buttars, April DiDomenico, Dave Giuli, Jennifer Hammond, David Horne, Valarie King, Martin McClellan, Aaron Meyer, Melissa Orquiza, Susie Seiter, Karen Smith
- Digital recordist and additional engineering by: Kevin Harp
- Vocals recorded at: Abbey Road Studios, Hercules Street Studios, Igloo Studios, Park Road Post, Pixar Animation Studios, Power Station at Berklee NYC, Trackdown Studios, Village Recorders
- Additional vocal engineering by: Joey Raia, Chandler Harrod, Derik Lee, Angie Teo, Andrew Dudman, John Barrett, Vince Caro
- Assistant engineers: Craig Beckett, Juan Carlos Martinez, Henry Reinach, Isaac Ross, Beth Scott, Jayden Whitbread
- Score recorded at: Eastwood Scoring Stage, Red Horse Studios
- Eastwood Scoring Stage crew: Brian Bair, David Clark, Thomas Hardisty, Peter Nelson, Jamie Olvera, Richard Wheeler Jr.
- Red Horse Studios assistant: Wyatt Wadsworth

Vocals and musicians

- Featuring performances by: Te Vaka, Opetaia Foaʻi, Olivia Fo’ai, Matatia Foa’i, Sulata Foa’i-Amiatu, Douglas "Fresh Bernard, Joe "Jojo" To’omata, Talaga Steve Sale, Neil "Nelly" Forrest, Melodee Panapa, Alana Foa’i-Auimatagi, Malcolm Smith, Matthew Ineleo
- Additional Pacific vocals: Savannah Foa’i-Amiatu, Zyon Foa’i-Amiatu, Merisa Foa’i-Wolfgramm, Theresa Vailega Talaga, Mequita Tai Amituana’i-To’omata, Tavita-Peasolo Hunt
- Additional song vocals: Andy Tofa, Jason Tam, Makoa, Daryl Tofa, Jonathan Christopher, Ben Thompson, Nik Walker, Tim Young, Gabriel "Shu Q" Leung, Anaseini Katoa, Heather Makalani, Isabella Spann, Aisha Jackson, Hannah Corneau, Susan Oliveras, Yvette González-Nacer, Alysha Umphress
- Score choir: Jana Anguay Alcain, Iwalani Apo, Piilani Flores, Waipu’ilani Flores-Simpson, Brandan Mafua, Te Maioha Makekau, Kau’ionālani Mead, Jerrod Mose, Mikaele Oloa, Ruta Savea Oloa, Kalenaku Parish, Noni Slade, Joshua "Baba" Tavares, Christian Vaa, Vanessa Sinaita’aga Mamalu Vaa
- "Song of the Mountain" Samoan translation by: Fa’alagilagi Tuala-Tama’alelagi-O’Brien
- Violins: Roger Wilkie (CM), Luanne Homzy (P2), Alyssa Park, Amy Hershberger, Ana Landauer, Ben Jacobson, Bruce Dukov, Carrie Kennedy, Charlie Bisharat, Eun-Mee Ahn, Grace Oh, Handyul Jang, Heather Powell, Helen Nightingale, Irina Voloshina, Jacqueline Brand, Jessica Guideri, Joel Pargman, Josefina Vergara, Kayvon Sesar, Lorand Lokuszta, Marisa Kuney, Max Karmazyn, Maya Magub, Michelle Shin, Natalie Leggett, Neil Samples, Paul Cartwright, Paul Manaster, Phil Levy, Rafael Rishik, Sandy Cameron, Sara Parkins, Sarah Thornblade, Shalini Vijayan, Songa Lee, Stephanie Matthews, Stephanie Yu, Tamara Hatwan, Tereza Stanislav, Wynton Grant
- Violas: Andrew Duckles, Alma Fernandez, Dave Walther, Diana Wade, Zach Dellinger, Jonah Sirota, Kiara Perico, Luke Maurer, Matt Funes, Meredith Crawford, Nadia Sirota, Rita Andrade, Rob Brophy, Shawn Mann, Stefan Smith
- Oboes: Lara Wickes (first), David Weiss, Jennifer Cullinan, Jessica Pearlman
- Cellos: Jacob Braun (first), Ben Lash, Cameron Stone, Tina Soule, David Low, Dennis Karmazyn, Giovanna Clayton, Paula Hochhalter, Ross Gasworth, Vanessa Freebairn-Smith
- Clarinets: Stuart Clark (first), Don Foster, Josh Ranz, Phil O’Connor
- Horns: Dylan Hart (first), Adam Wolf, Adedeji Ogunfolu, Allen Fogle, Amy Rhine, Andrew Bain, Avid Cooper, Jaclyn Rainey, Kaylet Torriz, Laura Brenes, Melia Badalian, Stephanie Thomas, Teag Reaves
- Basses: Nico Abondolo (first), David Parmeter, Drew Dembowski, Geoff Osika, Mike Valerio, Steve Dress, Stephanie Payne, Thomas Harte
- Flutes: Geri Rotella (first), Ben Smolen, Jenni Olson
- Bassoons: Rose Corrigan (first), Anthony Parnther, Damian Montano, William May
- Trumpets: Jon Lewis (first), Wayne Bergeron, Dan Fornero, Dan Rosenboom, Rod Schaer
- Tuba: Doug Tornquist
- Harp: JoAnn Turovsky
- Saxophones: Dan Higgins (first), Brandon Fields, James Mason
- Trombones: Alex Iles (first), Byron Sleugh, Craig Gosnell, Ido Meshulam, David Rejano Cantero, Dillon MacIntyre
- Percussion: Sefa Pumphrey (first), Louella Sumler, Lou Molino, Olin Caban, Stephen Sumler, Tiana Nonosina Liufau, Chloe Catherine Espino, Penni Rosenberg
- Celtic harp: Marcia Dickstein
- Guitar: David Levitt

== Charts ==
Chart performance for Moana (Original Motion Picture Soundtrack)
Chart (2026)	Peak position
UK Compilation Albums (Official Charts)	28
UK Soundtrack Albums (Official Charts)	37
US Kid Albums (Billboard)	7
US Soundtrack Albums (Billboard)	20

== Release history ==
Region	Date	Format(s)	Label(s)	Ref.
Various	June 26, 2026 (standard); July 8, 2026 (deluxe)	Digital download; streaming	Walt Disney Records	
Various	July 10, 2026	CD	Walt Disney Records	
Various	July 10, 2026	LP	Walt Disney Records	
