= Moana 2 (soundtrack) =

Moana 2 (Original Motion Picture Soundtrack)

Soundtrack album by various artists
- Released: November 22, 2024
- Recorded: 2023–2024
- Studios: Eastwood Scoring Stage, Warner Bros., Burbank; Trackdown, Sydney; Te Vaka, Mount Colah; Red Horse, Los Angeles
- Length: 32:38 (standard); 110:08 (deluxe)
- Languages: English; Tokelauan; Tuvaluan; Samoan
- Label: Walt Disney
- Producers: Mark Mancina; Opetaia Foaʻi; Abigail Barlow; Emily Bear

Mark Mancina chronology
Juror No. 2 (2024)	Moana 2 (Original Motion Picture Soundtrack) (2024)	Moana (2026)

Singles from Moana 2 (Original Motion Picture Soundtrack)
- 1. "Beyond (End Credit Version)" Released: November 7, 2024

Moana 2 (Original Motion Picture Soundtrack) is the soundtrack album to the 2024 Disney animated film Moana 2 released by Walt Disney Records on November 22, 2024. The 16-track album features original songs written by Mark Mancina and Opetaia Foaʻi returning from the first film, while Abigail Barlow and Emily Bear replaced the first film's composer Lin-Manuel Miranda to co-compose the songs.

The musical numbers were performed by the voice cast members, Auliʻi Cravalho, Dwayne Johnson, Rose Matafeo, David Fane, Rachel House, Awhimai Fraser, Hualālai Chung, along with New Zealand musicians Olivia Foa'i, Te Vaka, Sulata Foai-Amiatu, Matatia Foaʻi and Matthew Ineleo. A deluxe edition of the album was released on November 25, featuring the original score composed by Mancina and Foaʻi and six instrumental versions of the songs. The album was preceded by the first single "Beyond" released on November 7, 2024, as the spiritual sequel to "How Far I'll Go".

The soundtrack received mostly mixed reception from critics who compared the show tunes unfavorably to the music from its predecessor due to the absence of Miranda's involvement, while the instrumental score was a critical and commercial success.

== Development ==
"For two women to be part of that and trying to get to the heart of the story, which is a young woman finding her way, I couldn't think of a better duo than Barlow and Bear. ... This is a new part of my voice. ... This film digs into these low notes in these times of indecision when we don't know what we are supposed to do next. There's a lot of deeper layers to these songs."

— Cravalho on the involvement of Barlow and Bear, replacing Miranda, as the songwriters

Mark Mancina and Opetaia Foaʻi returned to compose the film score. In late 2021, Walt Disney Music president Tom MacDougall recruited Abigail Barlow and Emily Bear to replace Miranda as songwriters for what was then planned as a direct-to-streaming television series, after hearing the quality of their work on The Unofficial Bridgerton Musical. In 2022, they began to work with the production team on writing songs. Barlow and Bear are the youngest and the first all-female team to write the songs for a Disney film.

Lin-Manuel Miranda said that he was not asked by Walt Disney Animation Studios to return for the sequel because of a timing issue. As a longtime fan of The Lion King (1994), he was eager to work on Mufasa: The Lion King (2024). Miranda was busy in the second half of 2021 finishing the songs for Encanto, editing his first feature film as a director and doing press interviews to promote In The Heights, Vivo and Encanto (all released in 2021). He then needed to start working immediately on Mufasa at the beginning of 2022. Miranda, however, assisted by providing Barlow with "a stack of books" on how to write lyrics for musical films. According to Miranda, by the time Disney decided in January 2024 to turn the series into a feature-length sequel, Barlow and Bear were "already cooking", so it made more sense to continue with the songs they had already written. After the premiere, he praised Barlow and Bear: "Those girls are so insanely talented, and I was really proud of them."

Mancina and Foaʻi discussed with Barlow and Bear how to establish a new sonic landscape for Moana 2 with the already established themes, while also pushing Moana's voice to new places. Foaʻi and Mancina also assisted Barlow and Bear in utilizing the musical landscape of the Pacific and Polynesian culture, and the music team at Disney sent a bulk Dropbox library of drums, skins, logs and vocal samples from the first film. The two also met with members of the Oceania Cultural Trust, and real-life wayfinders, who inspired full songs with some of their ideas. Barlow recalled: "Working on this project taught me how to be a good collaborator", to tell stories through music and work with a "huge village of people" on the challenging task. Bear added that working with a large group helped them get in touch with "a big cultural anchor of the Pacific." Barlow further likened the songwriting process to a table tennis game, where "One of us will come to the table, or both of us will come to the table with ideas, and then it'll just be like ping pong, ping pong back and forth. You go through a million different rounds of notes, and the story goes through a million different lives before it's the movie you see on the screen."

Just as Moana's character had aged, so had Cravalho, with her deepened and expanded vocals reflecting the maturation of her instrument. This was used by the songwriters in "Beyond", a spiritual sequel to the first film's "How Far I'll Go", Moana's original "I Want" song. Since the film was reaching for themes larger than the character's personal journey, and also because the team wanted to make her more vulnerable, they designed the song "Beyond" as slightly darker than the first film's anthem. Bear commented: "Because the stakes are suddenly so much higher. She's about to make a big decision that will affect the rest of her life. She knows more of the world and what's out there, so she knows what to expect — and that could be scary."

The first song the duo wrote and composed is "We're Back", which uses the musical language from the first film to establish that the viewer is back in world of the first film, but to "show how the island has grown and thrived" and to introduce new characters. On November 11, Johnson revealed his song "Can I Get a Chee Hoo?" as a female empowerment song for Moana's character, which follows up Maui's original "You're Welcome". Johnson described the song as "vocally challenging" except for the rap portions.

== Release ==
On November 7, 2024, Disney revealed the full track list, along with the first single "Beyond" performed by Cravalho. The 16-track album featuring original songs were released on November 22, five days before the film's theatrical release. A deluxe edition soundtrack featuring Mancina and Foaʻi's original score and instrumental versions of the songs, were released on November 25. The album will be distributed in CD and vinyl LP formats at the Disney Music Emporium on January 10, 2025.

== Critical reception ==
Louis Peitzman of Vulture wrote that each song, without Miranda's involvement, "feels as flimsy and disposable as the last" and that added "the music of Moana 2 is the biggest mark against it with derivative melodies and clunky lyrics that screech the action to a halt. When the songs occasionally interpolate a line or motif from the original Moana score, it has the water-drop-in-a-desert effect of reminding us how far we've fallen." Dani Kessel Odom of Screen Rant commented: "Though the harmonies are enjoyable, the music in "What Could Be Better Than This?" is highly repetitive. The lyrics also feel surface-level, unlike those from songs in the first Moana movie. They aren't interesting to listen to because the slant rhymes are simple." Matt Patches of Polygon wrote, "In the end, Moana 2 is a vehicle for one banger, a feel-good throwback, and a few songs we'll never talk about again, which doesn't feel like enough for a brand-new Moana." Tyler Nichols of JoBlo.com called the music "more forgettable".

Owen Gleiberman of Variety said "The songs in “Moana 2,” by Abigail Barlow and Emily Bear, are perky and appealing, with that electrified island drum bounce, but most of them sound like the imitation-Lin-Manual knockoffs they are [...] none of the songs summon that indelible quality that sealed the story of “Moana” into our hearts." Ben Wasserman of Comic Book Resources, wrote the film falls short in its soundtrack, compared to the predecessor, and stated that despite the songs "Get Lost" and "Can I Get A Chee Hoo?" being catchy, "these songs never reach the level of earworm that made "You're Welcome" and "How Far I'll Go" such memorable classics amongst Disney fans." A dissenting voice was Sarah El-Mahmoud of Cinema Blend, who felt that Barlow and Bear "delivered on a memorable new Disney soundtrack packed with emotional callbacks and new melodies. ... I haven't been able to get the soundtrack out of my head".

"Beyond" and "Can I Get a Chee Hoo?" were nominated for the 2024 Hollywood Music in Media Award for Best Original Song in an Animated Film, and "Beyond" was nominated for a 2025 Society of Composers & Lyricists Award for Outstanding Original Song for a Comedy or Musical Visual Media Production.

== Track listing ==
Moana 2 (Original Motion Picture Soundtrack) standard edition track listing
No.	Title	Lyrics	Music	Performer(s)	Length
1.	"Tulou Tagaloa" (Sei e Va'ai Mai)	Opetaia Foaʻi	Foaʻi	Olivia Foa'i and Te Vaka	1:07
2.	"We're Back"	Abigail Barlow, Emily Bear and Foaʻi	Barlow, Bear and Foaʻi	Auliʻi Cravalho and Villagers of Motunui	3:12
3.	"Tuputupu" (The Feast)	Matatia Foa’i	Foa’i	Te Vaka	0:35
4.	"Beyond"	Barlow, Bear and Foaʻi	Barlow, Bear and Foaʻi	Auliʻi Cravalho feat. Rachel House	3:50
5.	"My Wish for You" (Innocent Warrior)	Foaʻi	Foaʻi	Olivia Foa'i, Sulata Foai-Amiatu, Matatia Foai, Matthew Ineleo and Opetaia Foaʻi	0:53
6.	"Finding the Way"	Foaʻi	Foaʻi and Mark Mancina	Olivia Foa'i and Te Vaka	1:29
7.	"What Could Be Better Than This?"	Barlow and Bear	Barlow and Bear	Auliʻi Cravalho, Hualālai Chung, Rose Matafeo and David Fane	2:59
8.	"Get Lost"	Barlow and Bear	Barlow and Bear	Awhimai Fraser	3:05
9.	"Can I Get a Chee Hoo?"	Barlow and Bear	Barlow and Bear	Dwayne Johnson	2:50
10.	"Mana Vavau"	Foaʻi	Foaʻi	Dwayne Johnson, Opetaia Foaʻi and Rachel House	1:31
11.	"Beyond" (Reprise)	Barlow, Bear and Foaʻi	Barlow, Bear and Foaʻi	Auliʻi Cravalho	0:53
12.	"Nuku O Kaiga"	Foaʻi	Foaʻi	Te Vaka	1:10
13.	"Finding the Way" (Reprise)	Foaʻi	Foaʻi and Mancina	Te Vaka	1:09
14.	"We Know the Way" (Te Fenua te Malie)	Foaʻi and Lin-Manuel Miranda	Foaʻi	Auliʻi Cravalho, Olivia Foa'i, Opetaia Foaʻi and Te Vaka	1:28
15.	"Beyond" (End Credit Version)	Barlow, Bear and Foaʻi	Barlow, Bear and Foaʻi	Auliʻi Cravalho feat. Te Vaka	3:16
16.	"We're Back" (Te Vaka version)	Barlow, Bear and Foaʻi	Barlow, Bear and Foaʻi	Olivia Foa'i, Sulata Foai-Amiatu and Te Vaka	3:11
Total length:					32:38

Moana 2 (Original Motion Picture Soundtrack) deluxe edition track listing
No.	Title	Lyrics	Music	Performer(s)	Length
17.	"Motufetu"		Mancina	Mark Mancina	2:58
18.	"An Easy Hop"		Mancina	Mark Mancina	1:09
19.	"The Wayfinder of Motunui"		Mancina	Mark Mancina featuring Te Vaka	0:55
20.	"Missed Connections"		Mancina	Mark Mancina	2:02
21.	"It's Me Maui"		Mancina	Mark Mancina	2:25
22.	"Sacred Title"		Mancina	Mark Mancina	4:03
23.	"Fire in the Sky"		Mancina	Mark Mancina	2:02
24.	"Assembling the Crew"		Mancina	Mark Mancina	1:57
25.	"Run and You'll Live"		Mancina	Mark Mancina	2:04
26.	"Out to Sea"		Mancina	Mark Mancina	3:49
27.	"Hei Hei Saves the Day"		Mancina	Mark Mancina	0:41
28.	"The Plan for the Clam"		Mancina	Mark Mancina	2:25
29.	"It's Go Time"		Mancina	Mark Mancina	2:09
30.	"Clam Chow"		Mancina	Mark Mancina	1:10
31.	"Maui Breaks Free"		Mancina	Mark Mancina	1:30
32.	"Meet Matangi"		Mancina	Mark Mancina	2:54
33.	"The Pearly Gate"		Mancina	Mark Mancina	2:02
34.	"Between Realms"		Mancina	Mark Mancina	1:34
35.	"Welcome to Pouli"		Mancina	Mark Mancina	2:00
36.	"Sea Snake Attack"		Mancina	Mark Mancina	1:19
37.	"Safe-ish for Now"		Mancina	Mark Mancina	1:47
38.	"Gotta Chee Hoo It"		Mancina	Mark Mancina	0:52
39.	"Stronger Together"		Mancina	Mark Mancina	1:59
40.	"Nalo"		Mancina	Mark Mancina	1:52
41.	"Waves Like Mountains"		Mancina and Foaʻi	Mark Mancina, Opetaia Foaʻi and Te Vaka	1:38
42.	"Change of Course"		Mancina	Mark Mancina	1:25
43.	"There's Another Way"		Mancina	Mark Mancina feat. Te Vaka	2:16
44.	"Just a Little Different"		Mancina	Mark Mancina feat. Te Vaka	2:37
45.	"Wayfinders"		Mancina	Mark Mancina	2:35
46.	"We're Back" (Instrumental)	Barlow, Bear and Foaʻi	Barlow, Bear and Foaʻi	Abigail Barlow, Emily Bear and Mark Mancina	3:12
47.	"Beyond" (Instrumental)	Barlow, Bear and Foaʻi	Barlow, Bear and Foaʻi	Abigail Barlow, Emily Bear and Mark Mancina	3:59
48.	"What Could Be Better Than This?" (Instrumental)	Barlow and Bear	Barlow and Bear	Abigail Barlow, Emily Bear and Mark Mancina	2:59
49.	"Get Lost" (Instrumental)	Barlow and Bear	Barlow and Bear	Abigail Barlow, Emily Bear and Mark Mancina	3:05
50.	"Can I Get a Chee Hoo?" (Instrumental)	Barlow and Bear	Barlow and Bear	Abigail Barlow, Emily Bear and Mark Mancina	2:50
51.	"Beyond" (End Credit Version/Instrumental)	Barlow, Bear and Foaʻi	Barlow, Bear and Foaʻi	Benjamin Rice	3:16
Total length:					110:08

== Charts ==
=== Weekly charts ===
Weekly chart performance for Moana 2 (Original Motion Picture Soundtrack)
Chart (2024–2025)	Peak position
Australian Albums (ARIA)	80
Austrian Albums (Ö3 Austria)	67
Belgian Albums (Ultratop Wallonia)	116
French Albums (SNEP)	34
Japanese Combined Albums (Oricon)	49
New Zealand Albums (RMNZ)	30
UK Compilation Albums (Official Charts)	7
UK Soundtrack Albums (Official Charts)	4
US Billboard 200	102
US Independent Albums (Billboard)	16
US Kid Albums (Billboard)	1
US Top Soundtracks (Billboard)	3
US World Albums (Billboard)	1

=== Year-end charts ===
Year-end chart performance for Moana 2 (Original Motion Picture Soundtrack)
Chart (2025)	Position
French Albums (SNEP)	145
US Top Soundtracks (Billboard)	6
US World Albums (Billboard)	4

== Certifications ==
Certifications for Moana 2 (Original Motion Picture Soundtrack)
Region	Certification	Certified units/sales
France (SNEP)	Gold	50,000^{‡}
United Kingdom (BPI)	Silver	60,000^{‡}
^{‡} Sales+streaming figures based on certification alone.

== Release history ==
Release history and formats for Moana 2 (Original Motion Picture Soundtrack)
Region	Date	Format(s)	Label(s)	Ref.
Various	November 22, 2024 (standard); November 25, 2024 (deluxe)	Digital download; streaming	Walt Disney Records	
Various	January 10, 2025	CD	Walt Disney Records	
Various	January 10, 2025	LP	Walt Disney Records	
