= Greatest Hits: Songs That Inspired Moana =

TE VAKA: Greatest Hits: Songs That Inspired Moana

Compilation album by Te Vaka
- Released: 18 August 2017
- Genre: South Pacific Fusion
- Label: Walt Disney Records

Te Vaka chronology
Te Vaka Beats: Percussion Album Vol. 1 (2017)	TE VAKA: Greatest Hits: Songs That Inspired Moana (2017)	Te Vaka Beats Vol. 2 (2020)

TE VAKA: Greatest Hits: Songs That Inspired Moana is a compilation album by the Oceanic group Te Vaka, released by Walt Disney Records in 2017. The album consists of songs selected by John Lasseter to encapsulate the history of the band and the sound that inspired the 2016 film Moana, as well as the new song "Lakalaka".

== Track listing ==
No.	Title	Writer(s)	Length
1.	"Tutuki"	Opetaia Foaʻi	3:06
2.	"Haoloto"	O. Foaʻi; Malcolm Smith	3:48
3.	"Pate Pate"	O. Foaʻi; Smith	3:17
4.	"Havili"	O. Foaʻi	4:01
5.	"Tele Ve Ko Koe"	O. Foaʻi	3:33
6.	"E Keli"	O. Foaʻi; Traditional	3:14
7.	"Sei Ma Le Losa"	O. Foaʻi; Smith	4:07
8.	"Taku Uo Pele"	O. Foaʻi	3:46
9.	"Manu Samoa"	O. Foaʻi; Smith	3:28
10.	"Papa E" (Edit)	O. Foaʻi	3:57
11.	"Lakalaka"	O. Foa'i; Matatia Foa'i	2:59
