= Haoloto =

Studio album by Te Vaka
- Released: December 5, 2009
- Genre: South Pacific Fusion
- Label: Spirit of Play Productions; Warm Earth Records

Te Vaka chronology
Olatia (2007)	Haoloto (2009)	Havili (2011)

Haoloto, is the sixth studio album, released in 2009, by the Oceanic group, Te Vaka. It won the Best Pacific Album category in the New Zealand Music Awards.

The title track is featured in "Gone Fishing", a short from the 2016 Walt Disney Pictures film Moana.

== Track listing ==
All tracks are written by Opetaia Foaʻi.

No.	Title	Length
1.	"Ata Fou"	4:21
2.	"Mau Piailug"	4:06
3.	"Tauasa"	4:13
4.	"Kaluve Pepe"	3:32
5.	"Te Maveaga"	4:47
6.	"Tui Moana"	4:20
7.	"Na Ko Koe"	4:01
8.	"Tolu Afe"	2:35
9.	"Katakata Mai"	3:41
10.	"Well... You Lied"	4:04
11.	"Tautaimi"	4:01
12.	"Haoloto"	3:49
13.	"Toe Fetaui"	3:48
14.	"Talanoa Te Pate"	1:34
15.	"Mana Malohi"	4:02
