= Nukukehe =

Studio album by Te Vaka
- Released: 2002
- Label: Spirit of Play Productions

Te Vaka chronology
Ki Mua (1999)	Nukukehe (2002)	Tutuki (2004)

Nukukehe, released in 2002, is the third album by the Oceanic group, Te Vaka.

This album is dedicated to environmental groups around the world for caring enough to do something about it. The song "Sei Ma Le Losa" was written for David McTaggart, who was killed in a car accident the previous year.

"Loimata e Maligi" (lit. "Let the Tears Fall Down") was written in memory of 18 girls and their matron who lost their lives in a fire at Motufoua Secondary School in Vaitupu, Tuvalu in 2000. The song was later rewritten as "An Innocent Warrior" for the 2016 Walt Disney Animation Studios film Moana.

== Track listing ==
No.	Title	Writer(s)	Length
1.	"Nukukehe"	Opetaia Foaʻi; Malcolm Smith	3:36
2.	"Manatu"	Foaʻi; Smith	4:55
3.	"Sei Ma Le Losa"	Foaʻi; Smith	4:04
4.	"Pukepuke Te Pate"	Foaʻi	2:37
5.	"Alamagoto"	Foaʻi; Smith	3:41
6.	"Tamatoa"	Foaʻi; Smith	3:43
7.	"Luelue"	Foaʻi	2:40
8.	"Toku Matua"	Foaʻi	4:37
9.	"Loimata e Maligi"	Foaʻi	3:31
10.	"Haloa Olohega"	Foaʻi	3:13
11.	"Sapasui"	Foaʻi	2:26
12.	"Te Hiva"	Foaʻi; Smith	3:00
13.	"Tesema"	Foaʻi; Smith	3:28
14.	"Te Vaka Ka Fano"	Foaʻi; Smith; Traditional	4:55

== Accolades ==
Nukukehe was nominated for "Best Roots Album" in the New Zealand music awards. It was also nominated for Audience Choice and Asia Pacific category in the BBC 3 World music awards.
