= Ki Mua =

Studio album by Te Vaka
- Released: 1999
- Recorded: 1998–1999
- Studio: Startrek Studios
- Length: Malcolm Smith, Opetaia Foa'i
- Label: Spirit of Play Productions/Warm Earth Records

Te Vaka chronology
| Te Vaka (1996) | Ki Mua (1999) | Nukukehe (2002) |

Ki Mua, released in 1999, is the second album by the Oceanic group, Te Vaka. This album contains the hit song "Pate Pate" which was very popular around the world and no.1 in the South Pacific.

== Track listing ==
All tracks are written by Opetaia Foaʻi, except where noted.

| No. | Title | Writer(s) | Length |
|---|---|---|---|
| 1. | "Ki Mua" | | 4:27 |
| 2. | "Lua Afe" | | 3:01 |
| 3. | "Ke Ke Kitea" | | 4:25 |
| 4. | "Pate Pate" | Foaʻi; Malcolm Smith | 3:16 |
| 5. | "Hea La Koe Iei" | | 5:07 |
| 6. | "Pate Mo Tou Agaga" | | 2:21 |
| 7. | "Vaka Atua" | O. Foa'i; Traditional | 4:29 |
| 8. | "Tagaloa" | | 4:08 |
| 9. | "Kaleve" | | 2:25 |
| 10. | "Sagalogalo Ake" | | 4:01 |
| 11. | "Aue Kapaku" | O. Foa'i; Traditional | 2:11 |
| 12. | "Kau Tufuga Fai Vaka" | | 4:42 |
