= Ralf J. Radlanski =

German medical professor (born 1958)

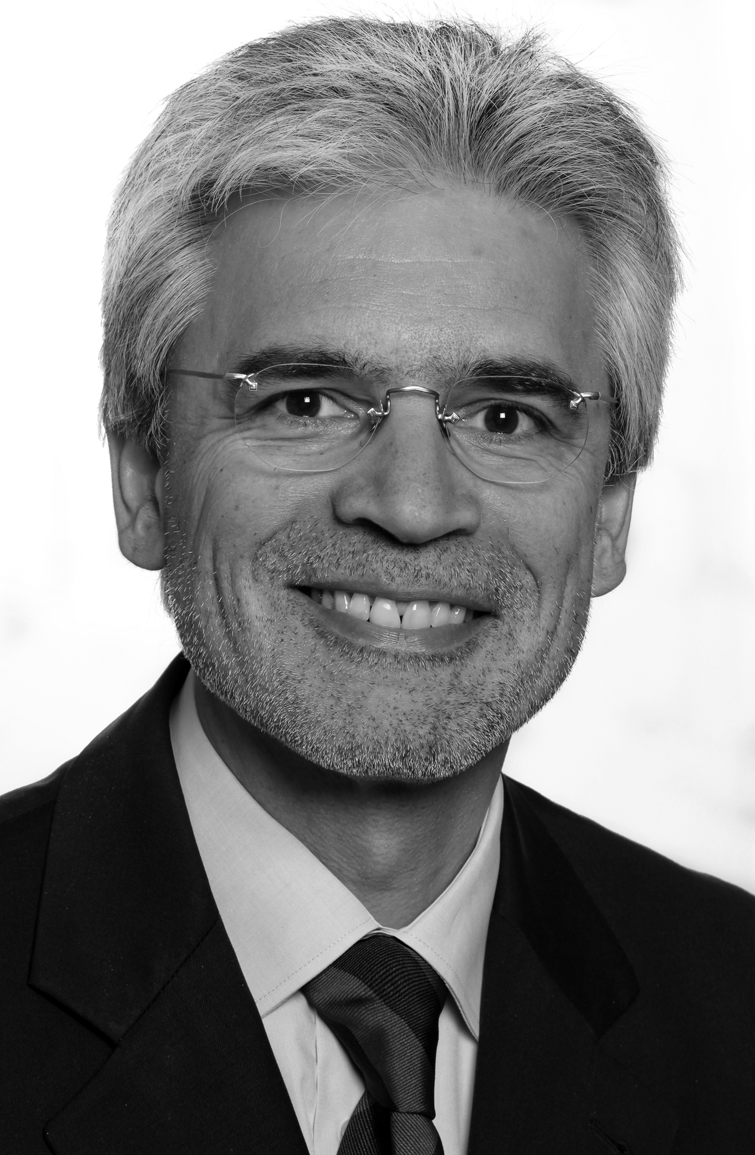
Ralf J. Radlanski

Ralf Johannes Radlanski (born 9 October 1958 in Paris) is a German anatomist, orthodontist and university professor. From 1992 to 2024 he was director of the Dept. of Craniofacial Developmental Biology at the Center for Dental and Craniofacial Sciences, Charité – University Medicine Berlin (Germany). When he became emeritus, the institution was closed. All of his lectures are published on YouTube. He was a guest professor at the University of California, San Francisco (USA), at the University of Turku (Finland), at the University of Queensland, Brisbane, at the University of Basle (Switzerland) and at the University of Zurich (Switzerland). He is a Dr. honoris causa at Coorg Institute of Dental Sciences Virajpet (India).

== Career ==
Ralf J. Radlanski studied medicine and dentistry at the Universities of Göttingen (Germany) and Minneapolis (MN, USA). He received his postgraduate education at the Institute of Anatomy at the University of Göttingen and he underwent a residency in orthodontics at the medical faculty of Göttingen University. In 1992 he was appointed professor and director of the Dept. of Craniofacial Developmental Biology at the Center for Dental and Craniofacial Sciences, Charité – University Medicine Berlin (Germany). His scientific work is focused on the visualization of prenatal craniofacial morphogenesis, as well as on microstructural research. Furthermore, he has contributed to practical orthodontic questions. With funding from the German Research Foundation (DFG), he established a human embryological serial section collection focused on craniofacial morphogenesis (the Radlanski Collection). An atlas featuring 3D reconstructions of the facial region across 34 developmental stages has been published by Springer Nature.

Radlanski is the author of over 100 scientific articles, has written and contributed to about a dozen textbooks and has given lectures in Europe, Africa, Asia and the USA.

With his violoncello, Ralf J. Radlanski is a member of the Berliner Ärzte-Orchester and the World Doctors Orchestra.

== Science management ==
- President and organizer of the 10th International Symposium of Dental Morphology, 1995 in Berlin
- National Delegate and Managing Board of the COST B 28 action (Craniofacial Morphogenesis) 2001–2008
- President and organizer of the 10th Tooth Morphogenesis and Tissue Differentiation Symposium 2010 in Berlin
- President of the International Orthodontic Symposium in 2004, 2006–2026 in Prague

== Honorary appointments ==
- President of the EurAsian Association of Orthodontists (EAO)
- President of the German Society for Aligner Orthodontics (DGAO)
- President of the Written Art Foundation (2009 - 2019)

== Selected publications ==
- Mein Gesicht, Quintessenz, Berlin 2016. ISBN 978-3-86867-338-8
- The Face. Pictorial Atlas of Clinical Anatomy. Quintessence Publ. Co. Chicago 2012 (with Karl H. Wesker) ISBN 978-1-85097-289-1
- Oral Structure & Biology (Textbook), Quintessence Publishing, Batavia, IL, USA 2018 ISBN 978-0-86715-746-8
- Facial Growth – Dynamics of Orthodontics, Vol 2a, (with Frans van der Linden und James McNamara), Quintessence Publ., Chicago 2006 ISBN 978-3-87652-473-3
- Normal Development of the Dentition, Malocclusions and interventions - Dynamics of Orthodontics, Vol. 3 a,b (with Frans van der Linden und James McNamara), Quintessence Publ., ISBN 978-3-87652-473-3
- Facial Growth, Dentition and Function - Dynamics of Orthodontics, Vol. 5 (with Frans van der Linden und James McNamara), Quintessence Publ., ISBN 978-3-87652-732-1
- Radlanski, Ralf Johannes: Atlas of Human Craniofacial Development. Springer, Cham 2025. ISBN 978-3-031-88811-3
