= Havili (album) =

Studio album by Te Vaka
- Released: 2011
- Genre: South Pacific Fusion
- Label: Spirit of Play Productions; Warm Earth Records

Te Vaka chronology
Haoloto (2009)	Havili (2011)	Amataga (2015)

Havili is the seventh studio album by the Oceanic group Te Vaka, released in 2011. It won second place in the ISC Awards.

The song "Logo te Pate" is featured in the 2016 Walt Disney Pictures film Moana. In 2022, it was certified Silver by the British Phonographic Industry (BPI).

== Track listing ==
All tracks are written by Opetaia Foa'i

No.	Title	Length
1.	"Havili"	4:02
2.	"Taku uo Pele"	3:46
3.	"Luga ma Lalo"	4:32
4.	"Vevela"	2:31
5.	"Logo te Pate"	3:24
6.	"Moemiti"	4:06
7.	"Tu i Fea"	3:53
8.	"Taumalo"	2:34
9.	"Lovely World"	4:03
10.	"Tamaiti Uma"	4:53
11.	"Manuia"	3:26
12.	"Puketu"	2:50
13.	"Kofu o Lakau"	4:09
