= WDO =

WDO may refer to:

- Women Development Organization, one of the eight specialized institutions of the Organisation of Islamic Cooperation
- World Doctors Orchestra, an orchestra made up entirely of physicians
- World Design Organization, an international organization focused on industrial design
- WDO, the National Rail station code for Waddon railway station, London, England
