= Te Vaka (album) =

Studio album by Te Vaka
- Released: 1996
- Genre: South Pacific Fusion
- Label: Spirit of Play Productions; ARC Music; Warm Earth Records

Te Vaka chronology
| Te Vaka (1996) | Ki Mua (1999) |

Professional ratings
Review scores
| Source | Rating |
|---|---|
| Allmusic | 4/5 stars |

Te Vaka, also known as Original Contemporary Pacific Music, is the 1996 self-titled debut album by the Oceanic group Te Vaka. Their music is often described as "South Pacific fusion", making use of contemporary musical styles while mixing in traditional instruments and themes from the South Pacific. This album has seen multiple releases, with some variations to the cover art and track listings due to changes in domestic and international distribution rights since its initial independent release in 1996. In October 2008 the album was made available as a digital download from Amazon.com

== Track listing ==
All tracks are written by Opetaia Foaʻi, except where noted.

| No. | Title | Writer(s) | Length |
|---|---|---|---|
| 1. | "Tokelau" | | 1:04 |
| 2. | "Te Namo" | | 5:02 |
| 3. | "Pate Mo Tou Vae" | | 2:56 |
| 4. | "Papa E" | | 4:17 |
| 5. | "Ki Te La" | O. Foa'i; Traditional | 4:26 |
| 6. | "Tautai E" | | 4:10 |
| 7. | "Vaka Gaoi" | | 2:15 |
| 8. | "Tagi Sina" | O. Foa'i; Traditional | 2:03 |
| 9. | "Te Vaka" | | 3:10 |
| 10. | "E Keli" | O. Foa'i; Traditional | 3:14 |
| 11. | "Ika Ika" | | 4:56 |
| 12. | "Siva Mai" (medley of traditional songs) | Traditional (arr. by O. Foa'i) | 4:13 |
