= Tutuki =

Studio album by Te Vaka
- Released: 28 June 2004
- Genre: South Pacific Fusion
- Label: Spirit of Play Productions; Warm Earth Records

Te Vaka chronology
Nukukehe (2002)	Tutuki (2004)	Olatia (2007)

Tutuki is the fourth album, released in 2004, by the Oceanic group, Te Vaka. It features the song Tamahana which won first place in the world music category of the 2008 International Songwriting Competition. and first place in the International category of the Australian Songwriting Association competition. This is the first of Te Vaka's albums to win the Best Pacific Album at the New Zealand Music Awards. Tutuki debuted on the World Music Chart Europe at number 4.

Tamahana is the theme song and lead song on the soundtrack to the film The Legend of Johnny Lingo.

== Track listing ==
All tracks are written by Opetaia Foaʻi, except where noted.

No.	Title	Writer(s)	Length
1.	"Samulai"	Foaʻi; Traditional	5:26
2.	"Tauale Mataku"		4:12
3.	"Lakilua"		2:52
4.	"Tutuki"		3:08
5.	"Tamahana"	Foaʻi; Malcolm Smith	4:03
6.	"Te Kaiga"		4:31
7.	"Magalogalo"		3:07
8.	"Uluhina"		3:25
9.	"Aivoli Taoa"		4:50
10.	"Oku Tupuga"		0:45
11.	"Manu Samoa"	Foaʻi; Smith	3:34
12.	"Te Lalama"		2:59
13.	"Iuliana"		4:12
14.	"Tofa E"		4:08
