= Olatia =

Studio album by Te Vaka
- Released: 14 August 2007
- Genre: South Pacific Fusion
- Label: Spirit of Play Productions; Warm Earth Records

Te Vaka chronology
Tutuki (2004)	Olatia (2007)	Haoloto (2009)

Olatia is the fifth studio album, released in 2007, by the Oceanic group, Te Vaka. It won the Best Pacific Album category in the New Zealand Music Awards Olatia has more of a contemporary feeling to it while still blending in traditional Polynesian music Te Vaka are known for, with many of the songs focusing on spiritual, social, or environmental issues.

== Track listing ==
All tracks are written by Opetaia Foaʻi and Malcolm Smith, except where noted.

No.	Title	Writer(s)	Length
1.	"Vakaaitu"		5:12
2.	"Lelei Ilo Tenei"		3:29
3.	"Nonu Paoa"		3:34
4.	"Lua Afe (Reload)"	Foaʻi	2:21
5.	"Ki Te Fakaolatia"		5:41
6.	"Ke Faitatala"		4:29
7.	"Mata O Tane"	Foaʻi	2:55
8.	"Tu Tokatahi"		2:49
9.	"Mataliki"	Foaʻi	4:35
10.	"Limatane"	Foaʻi	2:40
11.	"Vaitaimi Mihia"		4:24
12.	"Te Kupu"	Foaʻi; Traditional	5:16
13.	"Our Ocean"	Foaʻi	4:34
