= Emily Bear =

American composer and pianist (born 2001)

- Bear in 2026

Background information
- Born: August 30, 2001 (age 25)
- Origin: Rockford, Illinois, U.S.
- Genres: Classical, jazz, film score, musical theatre
- Occupations: Composer, pianist, songwriter, singer
- Instruments: Piano, vocals
- Years active: 2007–present
- Website: www.emilybear.com

Emily Jordan Bear (born August 30, 2001) is an American composer and pianist. After beginning to play the piano and compose music as a small child, Bear made her professional piano debut at the Ravinia Festival at the age of five, the youngest performer ever to play there. She gained wider notice from a series of appearances on The Ellen DeGeneres Show beginning at the age of six. She has since played her own compositions and other works with orchestras and ensembles in North America, Europe and Asia, including appearances at Carnegie Hall, the Hollywood Bowl, the Montreux Jazz Festival and Jazz Open Stuttgart. She won two Morton Gould Young Composer Awards, the youngest person ever to win the award, and also won two Herb Alpert Young Jazz Composers Awards.

In 2013, Bear released an album of her own jazz compositions, Diversity, produced by her mentor and manager, Quincy Jones. She composes and plays classical, jazz and pop music, film and TV scores, and is heard on the 2015 Broadway cast recording of the musical Doctor Zhivago. With her own jazz trio, she released an EP, Into the Blue, in 2017. She was the youngest performer in the history of the Night of the Proms tour (2017). Her 2019 EP Emotions was her first to feature Bear singing her own songs. In 2021, she and Abigail Barlow co-wrote and released an album inspired by the Netflix series Bridgerton, titled The Unofficial Bridgerton Musical, which won the 2022 Grammy Award for Best Musical Theater Album, making Bear the youngest Grammy nominee and winner ever in the musical theater category. She was listed on Forbes' 2022 30 Under 30. With the 2023 release of Dog Gone, she became "the youngest person to score a feature film for release on a streaming platform".

In mid-2023, she toured as the featured pianist for Beyoncé's Renaissance World Tour. Barlow and Bear wrote songs for the Disney animated film Moana 2 (2024).

== Early life ==
Bear was born and raised in Rockford, Illinois, the youngest of three children of Brian Bear, an orthopedic surgeon, and Andrea Bear. Her mother has sung professionally and has a music education degree. After being home-schooled for a few years, Bear enrolled in Guilford High School in Rockford in 2015, graduating at age 15 in 2017.

When Bear was two years old, her grandmother Merle Langs Greenberg, a piano teacher, recognized her talent at the piano. By age three, she had composed her first song, "Crystal Ice". The next year, Bear began to study with Emilio del Rosario at the Music Institute of Chicago. Hal Leonard Music has been publishing Bear's original compositions since she was 4 years old. She made her professional piano debut at the Ravinia Festival at age five, the youngest performer to play there. Soon she was enrolled at the Winnetka campus to study classical music. At age six, in 2008, she won her first ASCAP Foundation Morton Gould Young Composer Award for her piece "Northern Lights", the youngest composer ever to win the award. She also won the Rockford Area Music Industry Outstanding Achievement Award (RAMI) that year.

As a small child, Bear made six appearances on The Ellen DeGeneres Show. She played in 2008 at the White House for President George W. Bush, at the age of six, and performed Mozart's Piano Concerto No. 23 with the Champaign-Urbana Symphony Orchestra at the age of seven. She performed the same piece later in 2008 with the Rockford Symphony Orchestra. She also participated that year at the McDonald's Thanksgiving Parade in Chicago and performed the next year on Good Morning America. By the age of eight, Bear had composed more than 350 pieces, and between 2007 and 2010, she released five albums of her piano music.

From the age of six, Bear studied classical piano with the former principal keyboardist of the Chicago Symphony Orchestra, Mary Sauer, and later with Veda Kaplinsky, head of the piano department at the Juilliard School. She studied jazz improvisation with Frank Kimbrough and composing with Ron Sadoff, head of NYU Steinhardt film scoring department. She expressed a strong interest in film scoring, and in 2013 she was the youngest composer in history to attend the NYU Steinhardt Film Scoring Workshop.

== Career ==
=== 2010 to 2012: Carnegie Hall debut and festival performances ===
In 2010, Bear made her Carnegie Hall debut at the age of 9, playing her own piece for orchestra and chorus, "Peace: We Are the Future". The same year, she performed on the television show Dancing with the Stars.

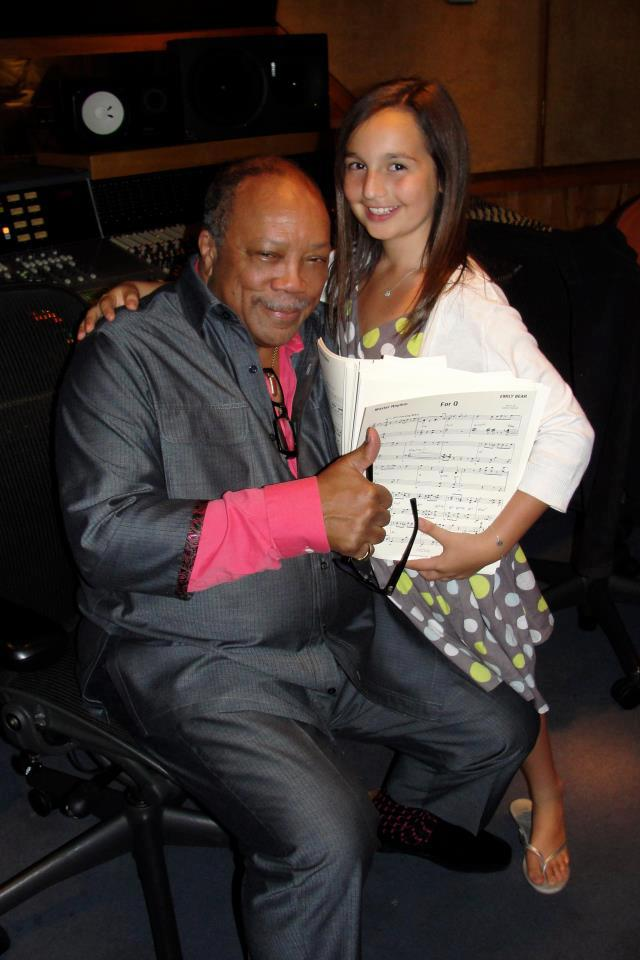
Bear with her mentor, Quincy Jones, 2012

In 2011, at the 3rd PTTOW! Youth Media and Innovation Summit in California addressed by the Dalai Lama, Bear performed her song "Diversity", which she had written in honor of the Dalai Lama. The same year, she began working with Quincy Jones, who became her mentor and manager. He presented Bear at the 45th Montreux Jazz Festival in Switzerland and the Festival Castell at the Peralada Castle in Spain, where she performed her original song, "Peralada", and a trio with Esperanza Spalding and Andrea Motis. Later in 2011, she appeared with him at the Hollywood Bowl, where she played a medley of her own arrangement, "Bumble Boogie" and accompanied "Miss Celie's Blues", from The Color Purple, sung by Gloria Estefan, Patti Austin, Siedah Garrett and Nikki Yanofsky. Jones stated: "I am at once astounded and inspired by the enormous talent that Emily embodies [with] the ability to seamlessly move from Classical to Jazz and Be-bop." Bear returned to Carnegie Hall at the end of the year.

In 2012, she performed as a guest in Zurich, Switzerland, on the "Art on Ice" skating arena tour before an audience of 15,000. She also performed at the Life Ball 2012 gala in Vienna, Austria, to benefit the charity AIDS Life. Later in 2012, she played the first movement of the Schumann piano concerto in A minor with the Santa Fe Concert Association. At this concert, the orchestra also debuted her composition "Santa Fe" and performed her arrangement of "Satin Doll". She returned to perform with the same orchestra two years later.

=== 2013 to 2016: Diversity ===
In 2013, Bear released Diversity, an album of original jazz compositions, on the Concord Records label, with bassist Carlitos del Puerto, drummer Francisco Mela and cellist Zuill Bailey, led by Bear at the piano. It was produced by Jones and recorded at Westlake Recording Studios in Los Angeles. The album peaked at No. 5 on Billboard's Jazz Albums chart and No. 3 on its Traditional Jazz Albums chart. Jeff Tamarkin wrote for JazzTimes:

Bear is a gifted (if not quite virtuosic yet) pianist ... who understands innately the role of her instrument in both solo and group capacities. She can improvise smartly, shift between genres, tempos and dispositions effortlessly, elevate a melody. ... [T]here's nothing childlike about Bear's music: While some of her classically informed ballads teeter on the edge of new age, she never quite falls into that hole; she already knows the difference between jazz and Muzak. With many super-talented children, there's often a sense that some sort of rote mechanism takes over and guides them, but Diversity feels like the work of an artist of depth and sensitivity."

Also in 2013, she again performed with the Rockford Symphony as part of its salute to big bands. She also composed the music for a national ad campaign for Weight Watchers, called "Simple Start". The same year, WGN-TV presented the documentary "Girl with a Gift", exploring Bear's early promise. The program won a 2014 Chicago/Midwest Emmy Award.

Ellen Marie Hawkins, in Relate magazine, commented about Diversity: "There's an excitement to this music, and ... I felt as if I was being whisked off with limitless energy, eager to see one thing and then just as quickly, experience another. ... I was smiling and I was dancing, and I was living through this music." Bear has often donated a portion of her earnings to charity. In July 2013 she participated in Quincy Jones 80th birthday concerts in Montreux, Switzerland, Seoul, South Korea and in Japan.

Bear performed in 2014 on The Queen Latifah Show, accompanying herself at the piano and singing "The Girl from Ipanema". In concerts and on broadcasts, Bear has demonstrated her ability to compose musical stories and mood music improvisationally upon request. In late 2014, she performed George Gershwin's Rhapsody in Blue, as well as her own compositions, with New Haven Symphony Orchestra, Winnipeg Symphony Orchestra and Performance Santa Fe Orchestra. Holly Harris wrote for the Winnipeg Free Press: "After wowing the crowd with a two-hour program of jazz and classical music selections, [Bear] tossed off Gershwin's knuckle-busting Rhapsody in Blue as easily as child's play." She also performed with her trio and cellist Dave Eggar at the ASCAP Centennial Awards in November. Since 2014, Bear has led the Emily Bear Trio, consisting of Bear, bassist Peter Slavov and drummer Mark McLean.

In 2015, Bear won another ASCAP Foundation Morton Gould Young Composer Award for her orchestral piece "Les Voyages". At the Jazz Open Stuttgart 2015 jazz festival, she gave several concerts. Bear appears on the 2015 Broadway Cast Recording of the musical Doctor Zhivago playing a solo piano version of "He's There". The same year, she composed, orchestrated and performed an orchestral piece, "The Bravest Journey", for the event "Stars & Stripes: A Salute to Our Veterans", with Rockford Symphony before General Colin Powell, veterans and others in Rockford, Illinois. She ended the year with her debut at Joe's Pub in New York City.

In 2016, for the opening charity gala of the "Play Me, I'm Yours" street piano event in Mesa, Arizona, Bear re-orchestrated "The Bravest Journey" for 25 pianos. The same year, Bear received a Herb Alpert Young Jazz Composers Award, from the ASCAP Foundation, for her jazz song "Old Office". In August 2016, she was featured in a Disney Channel program, performing the song "Reflection", from the film Mulan, with singer Laura Marano. Also in 2016, Bear returned to Rockford Symphony to play "Les Voyages" and Edvard Grieg's Piano Concerto in A minor. She also played with her trio at the Gilmore Festival in Kalamazoo, Michigan, and gave a concert with the Kishwaukee Symphony Orchestra, playing her own symphonic compositions "Santa Fe", "The Bravest Journey" and "Les Voyages", and George Gershwin's Rhapsody in Blue.

=== 2017–2018: Into the Blue; Night of the Proms tour ===
On January 27, 2017, Bear released a jazz EP, Into the Blue, with her trio, on her independent label, Edston Records. The EP includes five original jazz songs and her arrangement of Richard Rodgers' "My Favorite Things". Reviewing the album for All About Jazz, C. Michael Bailey wrote: "Bear demonstrates a capability well beyond her age. ... [She] tears percussively through her short and tightly composed originals 'Old Office' and 'Je Ne Sais Pas', before showing her willowy ballad chops on 'Araignee'. 'Tiger Lily' returns to up-tempo form, descending figures over a light, almost stride, beat. On 'My Favorite Things' the pianist surprises with an emotional depth translated into a mature lyricism." Luiz Orlando Carneiro of Jornal do Brasil felt that "Old Office" is driven by chords that refer to Dizzy Gillespie's "A Night in Tunisia"; "Je ne sais" pas has a bossa nova beat; "Indigo", also with a bossa nova feel, is more melancholy; and "Tiger Lily" has a theme that recalls Thelonious Monk's "It's Over Now". He also noted that "Araingnée" (spider in French), is adapted from Bear's soundtrack for an animated film about two spiders competing to create increasingly elaborate webs inspired by famous works of art. Mike Greenblatt of The Aquarian Weekly called the disc "a thoroughly delightful trio romp". The EP debuted at No. 7 on Billboard's Jazz Albums chart.

In January 2017, Bear performed three of her pieces at Valley Performing Arts Center near Los Angeles, California, in a concert benefit for Save a Child's Heart, an Israel-based international humanitarian organization that provides lifesaving heart surgery for children in developing countries. In 2017, she received her second ASCAP Herb Alpert Young Jazz Composers Award, for her song "Je ne sais pas", and won a 2017 RAMI award for composition of the year. Bear participated in Chicago, in March, in Concert for America: Stand Up, Sing Out! to benefit several human rights charities. As a recipient of the Morton Gould Young Composers Award, she was commissioned to write a choral piece, "We have a dream" (with lyrics adapted from "I have a dream"), which she premiered and accompanied at St. Ignatius of Antioch Church in New York City in May. In June, Bear performed with her trio at the Blues'n'Jazz Festival in Rapperswil, Switzerland.

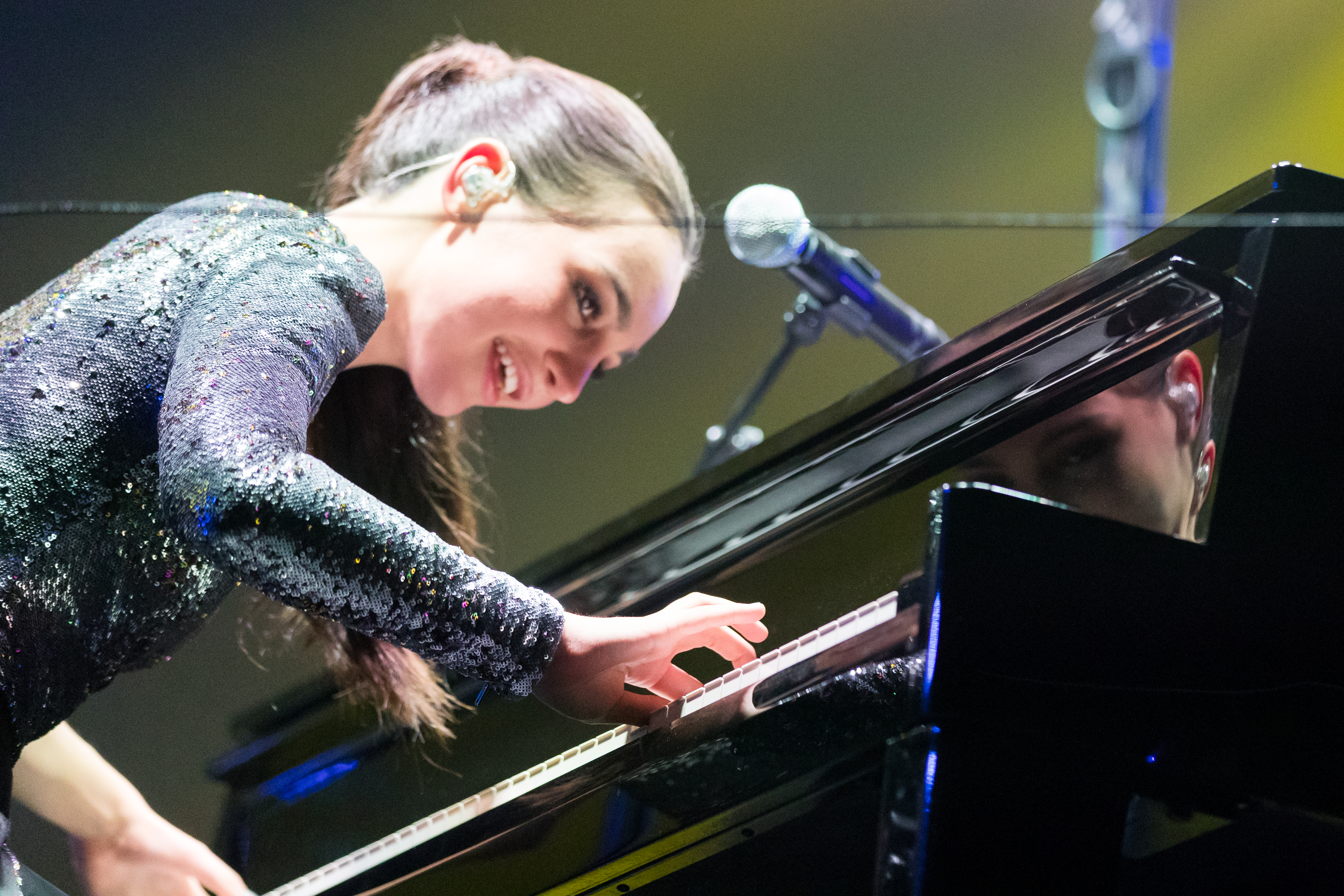
Bear performing at Night of the Proms 2017 in SAP Arena, Mannheim (Germany)

In November 2017, Bear performed the piano score to The Cat Concerto live at the Hollywood Bowl, accompanying screenings of the 1947 Tom and Jerry short. From late November to December, Bear performed at Night of the Proms 2017, a 25-concert arena tour in Belgium, the Netherlands, Germany and Luxembourg. She was the youngest artist ever to appear at Night of the Proms. In each concert, she played "Epilogue" from the film La La Land, led her orchestral/choir arrangements of "Skyfall" and "Crazy", composed an improvised musical story based on a suggestion by an audience member, and played "Bumble Bear Boogie" and part of Rachmaninoff's second piano concerto, leading into "All by Myself" with John Miles, among other things. Reviewers called Bear the highlight of the concerts and the "discovery of the evening".

Bear was a 2018 recipient of Illinois' Order of Lincoln Award, the state's highest honor for professional achievement and public service. She was the youngest recipient of that award. At the award ceremony, she led the Rockford Symphony in her composition, "And Forever Free", celebrating "the spirit of Abraham Lincoln". In May, Bear returned to the Hollywood Bowl to play two performances of the Freddy Martin piano and orchestra arrangement of "Bumble Boogie" live to the segment of the same name in the 1948 Disney film Melody Time as part of an evening that featured a live concert of the Beauty and the Beast soundtrack. In June, Bear received a 2018 Abe Olman Scholarship at the Songwriters Hall of Fame Awards in New York City. In July she performed Gershwin's Rhapsody in Blue with the Grant Park Symphony Orchestra at the Grant Park Music Festival in Chicago's Jay Pritzker Pavilion.

=== 2019–2021: Emotions; Bridgerton concept album ===
In February 2019, Bear played with the World Doctors Orchestra in Israel to benefit Save a Child's Heart and also sang together with Ester Rada. Bear composed and sang "More than Just a Girl" and "Daylight", two songs in the film Nancy Drew and the Hidden Staircase. She also played the piano on the score for another 2019 film, A Dog's Journey. The same year she returned to the Hollywood Bowl to play her new score to the 1938 Disney short film Merbabies, as part of the 30th Anniversary celebration of Disney's The Little Mermaid.

Bear released an EP of pop songs, Emotions, in October 2019. A single from the album, "I'm Not Alone" was released in April 2019 and featured in the TV show Love & Hip Hop: Atlanta. She performed a second single, "Dancin'", on The Ellen DeGeneres Show in June. Bear performed several concerts beginning in August 2019 and released the album's title track, "Emotions", in September. The critic for Rockford Register Star wrote: "The songs pair her jazzy pop-charged vocals with her ability to write catchy tunes." In April 2020, she arranged the music, accompanied and sang for a project involving 117 dancers, including Radio City Rockettes and Broadway dancers, titled Don'tcha Wanna Dance?.

Bear met songwriter Abigail Barlow around 2019. In 2021 they wrote songs together for a musical inspired by the first season of the Netflix series Bridgerton, livestreaming their songwriting and recording sessions, incorporating viewer suggestions, and posting demos of the songs on TikTok and other social media. Members of Bidgerton's cast, the writer of the Bridgerton novels and Netflix expressed their admiration of the musical numbers. Bear and Barlow received more than 300 million views and 48 million likes on TikTok. The two performed songs from the musical in New York City at Elsie Fest in August 2021 and in London in November with Bear at the piano. Bear orchestrated and produced a concept album consisting of 15 of the songs, The Unofficial Bridgerton Musical, which she and Barlow released on September 10, 2021. It debuted at No. 3 on the Heatseekers Albums chart and No. 36 on the Top Album Sales chart, among other Billboard charts. Bear and Barlow performed their song "Ocean Away" with Darren Criss at the Kennedy Center 50th anniversary concert in September, which aired on PBS on October 1, 2021. The album won the 2022 Grammy Award for Best Musical Theater Album. Bear is the youngest Grammy nominee, and youngest winner, in the musical theater category to date.

Also in 2021 Bear orchestrated and conducted "The Magic Is Calling", an anthem written to celebrate Walt Disney World's 50th anniversary, scored, with Brooke Blair, two episodes of the streaming series The Premise, and composed the music for the KCET documentary Life Centered: The Helen Jean Taylor Story, for which she won a 2022 Los Angeles Area Emmy Award. She became a founding member of the Leadership Council of The Recording Academy's Songwriters & Composers Wing in 2021.

=== 2022–present ===
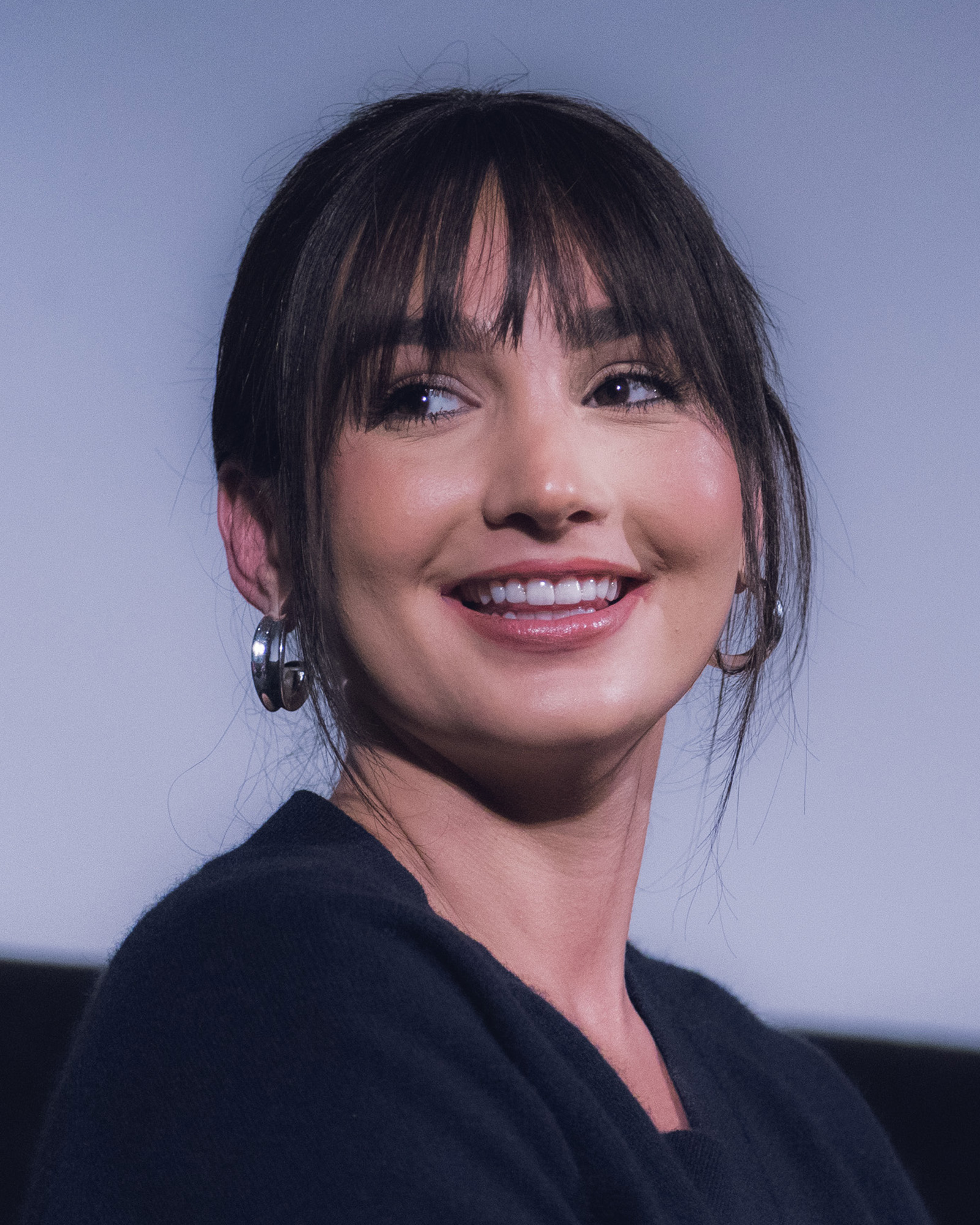
Bear in 2024

Bear was listed on the Forbes' 2022 30 Under 30. She plays the piano on the soundtrack to the game Syberia: The World Before (2022). Early in 2022, she returned to play with the World Doctors Orchestra in Anguilla. She and Barlow performed "Burn for You" from their Bridgerton album on Today in April and "Alone Together" on The Kelly Clarkson Show in May, and in July, Bear participated in the PBS concert A Capitol Fourth in Washington, D.C. Also in July, Bear and Barlow performed their album live in concert with the National Symphony Orchestra, conducted by Steven Reineke, and guest stars including Kelli O'Hara, at the Kennedy Center.

In late July 2022, Netflix sued Bear and Barlow in U.S. federal court for copyright infringement, claiming that they had objected to any for-profit live concerts of the songs. The company discontinued the lawsuit in September 2022 after a reported settlement. Also in 2022, Bear and Barlow were engaged by Taco Bell to write the music for Mexican Pizza: The Musical, with a book by Hannah Friedman, which featured Doja Cat and Dolly Parton. The satirical musical's true story concerns the eponymous fan-favorite item at Taco Bell, Mexican pizza, which was removed from, and later returned to, its menus. The musical streamed on Taco Bell's TikTok and YouTube accounts on September 15, 2022.

Bear composed the score of the Netflix film Dog Gone, based on the 2016 book by Pauls Toutonghi; the film and soundtrack album were both released in January 2023. The release made her "the youngest person to ever score a feature film to be released on any streaming platform". Nell Minow of RogerEbert.com called it "a fine score", while Jonathan Broxton of Movie Music UK wrote:

The whole thing overflows with charm and warmth, and is awash in beautifully sentimental string passages, backed by appealing woodwind writing, and enlivened with moments of sprightly piano-led effervescence, light comedy, and entertaining action featuring lively guitars and jovial percussion. Some of the music occasionally has a country twang, both in its orchestrations, and in some of the slurred accents at the end of the string phrases, which increases its tonal appeal. [The score] is consistently enjoyable and dramatically engaging throughout ... [and is] by turns sprightly and lively, warmly nostalgic, and playfully comedic. ... [T]he orchestrations ... are, on the whole, terrific [and] bring a sense of sparkling movement, and a lightness of touch ... which just give the entire work an inviting and engaging personality. [T]he music is able to offer a variety of emotional touchstones and interesting thematic explorations in a limited timeframe.

In mid-2023, Bear toured as the featured pianist for Beyoncé's Renaissance World Tour and appears in the concert film Renaissance: A Film by Beyoncé. Barlow and Bear wrote songs for the film Moana 2 (2024), the youngest composers, and the first female songwriting team for an animated Disney movie. Two of their songs, "Beyond" and "Can I Get a Chee Hoo?", were nominated for the 2024 Hollywood Music in Media Award for Best Original Song in an Animated Film, and "Beyond" was nominated for a 2025 Society of Composers & Lyricists Award for Outstanding Original Song for a Comedy or Musical Visual Media Production. In 2024, Bear scored the indie film K-Pops!, which a reviewer called a "killer soundtrack", and the Netflix movie Our Little Secret. A review of her live set at the Sundance Film Festival in 2026 said Bear "commanded the audience's attention. ... Though many of her songs are rooted in sadness, they carry an infectious rhythm that makes them feel alive ... leaving the crowd visibly moved and eager for more." She was a songwriter and producer on Meghan Trainor's 2026 album Toy with Me.

Bear wrote two of the musical numbers in the film Behemoth! (2026). With Barlow, she wrote the score for To Die for Love (Barlow co-wrote the script with Julia Aks), a musical scheduled to be available on TikTok on December 21, 2026, produced by TikTok and Ampersand, led by Agnes Chu; a soundtrack is set to be released by Atlantic Records.

== Discography ==
- Five Years Wise (2007)
- The Love in Us (2008)
- Once Upon a Wish (2008)
- Always True (2009)
- Hope (2010)
- Diversity (2013)
- Into the Blue EP (2017)
- Emotions EP (2019)
- The Unofficial Bridgerton Musical (2021, with Abigail Barlow)
- Moana 2 (2024, with Barlow, Mark Mancina and Opetaia Foaʻi)
