= Soundtrack album =

Music recorded directly from the soundtrack of a piece of media

A soundtrack album is any album that incorporates music directly recorded from the soundtrack of a particular feature film or television show. The first such album to be commercially released in was Walt Disney's Snow White and the Seven Dwarfs, the soundtrack to the film Snow White and the Seven Dwarfs, in 1938. The first soundtrack album of a film's orchestral score was that for Alexander Korda's 1942 film Rudyard Kipling's Jungle Book, composed by Miklós Rózsa.

== Overview ==
When a feature film is released, or during and after a television series airs, an album in the form of a soundtrack is frequently released alongside it.

A soundtrack typically contains instrumentation or alternatively a film score. But it can also feature songs that were sung or performed by characters in a scene (or a cover version of a song in the media, re-recorded by a popular artist), songs that were used as background music in important scenes, songs that were heard in the closing credits, or songs for no apparent reason related to the media other than for promotion, that were included in a soundtrack. Before home video became widespread in the 1980s, many soundtrack albums would also feature snippets of dialogue, as this was one of the few ways to re-experience a film after its original release apart from television broadcasts or theatrical reissues.

Soundtracks are usually released on major record labels (just as if they were released by a musical artist), and the songs and the soundtrack itself can also be on music charts, and win musical awards.

By convention, a soundtrack record can contain any kind of music including music "inspired by" but not actually appearing in the movie; the score contains only music by the original film's composers.

Contemporaneously, a soundtrack can go against normality, (most typically used in popular culture franchises) and contains recently released or exclusive never before released original pop music selections, (some of which become high-charting records on their own, which due to being released on another franchises title, peaked because of that) and is simply used for promotional purposes for well known artists, or new or unknown artists. These soundtracks contain music not at all heard in the film/television series, and any artistic or lyrical connection is purely coincidental.

However depending on the genre of the media the soundtrack of popular songs would have a set pattern; a lighthearted romance might feature easy listening love songs, whilst a more dark thriller would compose of hard rock or urban music.

In 1908, Camille Saint-Saëns composed the first music specifically for use in a motion picture (L'assasinat du duc de Guise), and releasing recordings of songs used in films became prevalent in the 1930s. Henry Mancini, who won an Emmy Award and two Grammys for his soundtrack to Peter Gunn, was the first composer to have a widespread hit with a song from a soundtrack.

Before the 1970s, soundtracks (with a few exceptions), accompanied towards musicals, and was an album that featured vocal and instrumental, (and instrumental versions of vocal songs) musical selections performed by cast members. Or cover versions of songs sung by another artist.

After the 1970s, soundtracks started to include more diversity, and music consumers would anticipate a motion picture or television soundtrack. Many top-charting songs were featured or released on a film or television soundtrack album.

Nowadays, the term "soundtrack" sort of subsided. It now mostly commonly refers to instrumental background music used in that media. Popular songs featured in a film or television series are instead highlighted and referenced in the credits, not a part of a "soundtrack".

In advertisements or store listings, soundtrack albums are sometimes confused with original cast albums. These are albums made with the original stage cast of a musical, and are recorded by the cast either in live performance or in a studio, not transferred from a movie soundtrack.

In some cases, recorded dialogue may be incorporated into the soundtrack album. This comes in two kinds: audio clips from the movie itself (used on the albums for Pulp Fiction and Apollo 13, for example) or radio dramas that involve the characters from the movie involved in other events (example: King of Pirates, from FLCL). The unusual first soundtrack album of the 1939 film The Wizard of Oz, issued in 1956 in conjunction with the film's first telecast, was virtually a condensed version of the film, with enough dialogue on the album for the listener to be able to easily follow the plot, as was the first soundtrack album of the 1968 Romeo and Juliet, and the soundtrack albums of The Taming of the Shrew (1967 version), Cromwell, and Little Big Man. In the case of Patton, the bulk of the album featured the film's musical score, while the opening and final tracks featured George C. Scott's opening and closing speeches from the movie. The highly unusual soundtrack album of the 1972 mystery film Sleuth was designed as a sort of teaser, with Laurence Olivier and Michael Caine's voices heard for the first three minutes, after which the dialogue was abruptly cut off and the musical score of the film took over, forcing listeners to "see the film if they wished to know what the mystery was all about."

In a few rare instances, the complete soundtrack for a film — dialogue, music, sound effects, etc. — has been released. One notable example was a 3-LP set of the 1977 Rankin-Bass film The Hobbit. Because this particular film was produced for television, it lent itself well to the LP format: built-in commercial insert points were used to end each LP side, thus avoiding any additional editing. Another example was the above-mentioned Zeffirelli Romeo and Juliet – the movie proved so popular that two years after the film's original release, an album set of the complete soundtrack was released. Still another example was the Laurence Olivier Richard III, the soundtrack of which was released as a 3-LP album by RCA Victor in 1955.

=== Extra tracks ===
Sometimes tracks not in the movie are included in the album, especially on a CD release of the soundtrack as opposed to an LP. Some of these may be "outtakes" (songs or instrumental music recorded for use in the movie but "cut" in the final edit as released), or they may have been used in trailers but not in the movie itself. Examples include the South Park: Bigger, Longer & Uncut soundtrack. Two other well-known examples are the soundtrack albums to Rodgers and Hammerstein's Carousel and The King and I both of which include two or more songs not heard in the finished film.

=== Popularity in cultures ===
Soundtrack albums account for the bulk of the Indian music industry. Music from the Indian film industry, particularly the music of Bollywood, usually sells more than Indian pop records.

== Lists ==
=== Best-selling soundtrack albums ===
Year	Album	Artists	Claimed sales (in millions)	Ref.
1992	The Bodyguard	Whitney Houston & Various	50	
1987	Dirty Dancing	Various artists	42	
1977	Saturday Night Fever	Bee Gees & Various	40	
1997	Titanic: Music from the Motion Picture	James Horner & Various	30	
1978	Grease: The Original Soundtrack from the Motion Picture	Various	28	
1965	The Sound of Music	Various	20	
1995	Dilwale Dulhania Le Jayenge	Jatin-Lalit	20	
1990	Aashiqui	Nadeem-Shravan	20	
1991	Saajan	Nadeem-Shravan	20	

=== Best-streaming soundtrack albums ===
Rank	Year	Soundtrack	Artist(s)	Streams (billions)	Ref.
1	2015	Furious 7 ("See You Again")	Wiz Khalifa, Charlie Puth	4.9	
2	2018	A Star Is Born	Lady Gaga, Bradley Cooper	4.3	
3	2017	The Greatest Showman	Hugh Jackman, Keala Settle, Zac Efron, Zendaya, various	4	
4	2013	Frozen ("Let It Go")	Robert Lopez, Kristen Anderson-Lopez, Idina Menzel, Kristen Bell	3.1	
5	2016	Moana	Lin-Manuel Miranda, Mark Mancina, Opetaia Foaʻi, Auliʻi Cravalho, Alessia Cara	2.5	
6	2016	Suicide Squad	Skrillex, Rick Ross, Lil Wayne, Wiz Khalifa, various	2.5	
7	2015	Fifty Shades of Grey	Ellie Goulding, The Weeknd, various	2.4	
8	2016	Trolls ("Can't Stop the Feeling!")	Justin Timberlake	1.7	
9	2017	Tiger Zinda Hai	Vishal–Shekhar, Irshad Kamil, Atif Aslam, Vishal Dadlani, Neha Bhasin, various	1.6	
10	2018	Bohemian Rhapsody ("Bohemian Rhapsody")	Queen	1.6	

== See also ==
- Cast recording – for musical theater
- Show tune
