= The Unofficial Bridgerton Musical =

Studio album by Barlow & Bear
- Released: September 10, 2021
- Recorded: 2021
- Genre: Musical theatre
- Producer: Emily Bear

The Unofficial Bridgerton Musical is a concept album by Abigail Barlow and Emily Bear based on season 1 of the Netflix series Bridgerton. They developed the songs on the album on TikTok in early 2021 in a series of live sessions, during which they received and incorporated viewer feedback. Released in September 2021, the album charted on Billboard and elsewhere. It later won the 2022 Grammy Award for Best Musical Theater Album and was the first Grammy winner to be developed on TikTok. Barlow and Bear became the youngest nominees and winners ever in their Grammy category.

Barlow and Bear promoted the album by appearing at various venues and on television and online to perform songs from album. In July 2022, they organized a live concert performance of the musical at the Kennedy Center with notable guest soloists such as Kelli O'Hara. The same month, Netflix sued the two in U.S. federal court for copyright infringement and to prevent further live performances, but it dropped the suit in September after a reported settlement.

== Conception and development ==
In January 2021, singer-songwriter Abigail Barlow posted a TikTok video in which she asked, "What if Bridgerton was a musical?" and sang a verse of a song that she had written based on a line uttered by a character in the Netflix series Bridgerton. Before posting the video, she sent the song to her writing partner, composer-producer Emily Bear, who arranged the number. The video received wide attention, and so Barlow and Bear teamed up to write more songs inspired by the first season of the TV series. The two livestreamed their songwriting and recording sessions from Los Angeles in early 2021, inviting and incorporating viewer suggestions, and posted demos of the songs on TikTok and other social media.

Members of Bridgerton's cast, the author of the Bridgerton series of novels, and Netflix expressed their admiration of the musical numbers, and Netflix did not stand in the way of the release of an album of the songs. By September 2021, Barlow and Bear had received more than 200 million views and 48 million likes on TikTok. The two performed several of the songs in New York City at Elsie Fest in August 2021 and in London in November, with Bear at the piano and Barlow doing most of the singing, along with several guest artists.

== Production and release ==
Bear orchestrated and produced a concept album consisting of 15 of the songs, The Unofficial Bridgerton Musical, with Barlow again singing most of the vocals, and Bear singing the rest; they released the album on September 10, 2021. It debuted at No. 3 on the Heatseekers Albums chart and No. 36 on the Top Album Sales chart, among other Billboard charts.

== Post-release ==
Bear and Barlow performed a song from the album, "Ocean Away", with Darren Criss at the Kennedy Center 50th anniversary concert in September, which aired on PBS on October 1, 2021. The two performed "Burn for You" from the album on Today in April 2022 and "Alone Together" on The Kelly Clarkson Show in May.

=== Grammy Award ===
The album won the 2022 Grammy Award for Best Musical Theater Album. It is the first musical that originated on TikTok and the only musical that had not been staged by the time of the ceremony to win a Grammy in the musical theatre category. Bear and Barlow were the youngest Grammy winners and nominees in the category.

=== Live concert and lawsuit ===
In July 2022, Bear and Barlow performed the album live in concert with the National Symphony Orchestra, conducted by Steven Reineke, at the Kennedy Center. Guest soloists were Solea Pfeiffer, Micaela Diamond, Ephraim Sykes, Denée Benton, Emmy Raver-Lampman, Jason Gotay and Kelli O'Hara, with direction by Sammi Cannold. A similar concert was planned for September 2022 at the Royal Albert Hall in London with the BBC Concert Orchestra, but it was cancelled following the initiation of the Netflix lawsuit against Barlow and Bear.

In late July 2022, Netflix sued Barlow and Bear in the U.S. district court for Washington, D.C. for copyright infringement and to enjoin further live performances, claiming that the company had objected to live concerts of the album and that Barlow and Bear had refused a licensing deal with Netflix. The lawsuit also alleged that live shows competed with Netflix's own live touring "Bridgerton Experience". The company discontinued the case in September 2022 after a reported settlement.

== Track listing ==
All tracks are written by Abigail Barlow and Emily Bear.

No.	Title	Length
1.	"Tis the Season"	5:19
2.	"Lady Whistledown"	1:19
3.	"If I Were a Man"	2:59
4.	"Penelope Featherington"	2:45
5.	"The Ruse"	3:00
6.	"Fool for You"	0:52
7.	"Alone Together"	2:13
8.	"Entertain Me"	3:33
9.	"Friend Turned Foe"	2:30
10.	"Burn for You"	2:54
11.	"Worker Bee"	0:52
12.	"Every Inch"	2:46
13.	"Burned Me Instead"	1:02
14.	"Balancing the Scales"	2:23
15.	"Ocean Away"	3:15

== Charts ==
Weekly chart performance for The Unofficial Bridgerton Musical
Chart (2021)	Peak position
US Top Heatseekers Albums (Billboard)	3
US Top Album Sales (Billboard)	36
US Top Current Album Sales (Billboard)	26
