= Moana (2016 soundtrack) =

Moana: Original Motion Picture Soundtrack

Soundtrack album by various artists
- Released: November 19, 2016
- Recorded: 2016
- Studios: Eastwood Scoring Stage, Warner Bros. Studios, Los Angeles (score) Elbo Studios, Avatar Studios, The Hit Factory, NRG Recording Studios, Red Horse Studios, University of the South Pacific
- Genre: Film score
- Length: 1:09:40
- Languages: English, Tokelauan, Tuvaluan, Samoan
- Label: Walt Disney
- Producers: Mark Mancina; Lin-Manuel Miranda; Opetaia Foaʻi; Tom MacDougall

Mark Mancina chronology
Planes: Fire & Rescue (2014)	Moana: Original Motion Picture Soundtrack (2016)	Cry Macho (2021)

Singles from Moana: Original Motion Picture Soundtrack
- 1. "How Far I'll Go (Alessia Cara version)" Released: November 3, 2016; 2. "You're Welcome (Dwayne Johnson version)" Released: December 7, 2016; 3. "You're Welcome (Jordan Fisher version)" Released: March 1, 2017

Moana: Original Motion Picture Soundtrack is the soundtrack to the 2016 Disney animated film of the same name. The soundtrack was released by Walt Disney Records on November 19, 2016. It features original songs written by Lin-Manuel Miranda, Mark Mancina and Opetaia Foaʻi, with orchestrations provided by David Metzger, and with lyrics in English, Samoan, Tokelauan and Tuvaluan. The two-disc deluxe edition includes the score, which was composed by Mancina, as well as demos, outtakes and instrumental karaoke tracks. The record also produced two singles.

The album debuted on the Billboard 200 chart at number 16 and peaked at number 2, kept off the top spot by The Weeknd's Starboy. "How Far I'll Go" won the Grammy Award for Best Song Written for Visual Media, and was nominated for the Golden Globe Award for Best Original Song and the Academy Award for Best Original Song.

== Recording ==
For the soundtrack, Disney wanted to combine traditional South Pacific culture with pop and Broadway sensibilities, which led to the hiring of Broadway playwright, songwriter and composer Lin-Manuel Miranda, composer Mark Mancina and Tokelauan singer-songwriter Opetaia Foaʻi. The first song they completed was "We Know the Way", which Foa'i began after his first meeting with Disney in December 2013. The trio worked together in New Zealand and in Los Angeles. At the same time, Miranda was also developing and starring in the Broadway musical Hamilton, which meant he was able to recruit Hamilton stars Phillipa Soo, Christopher Jackson, and Renée Elise Goldsberry as well as In The Heights star Marcy Harriell to help him record demos of his songs.

Since Hamilton had not yet premiered on Broadway at the time Disney Animation was hiring a songwriter, Miranda was still relatively unknown and had to audition for Moana. The day he got the job was the same day he learned he was going to become a father. He was overjoyed to meet directors John Musker and Ron Clements, where he told them they were the reason he became a songwriter, because the song "Under the Sea" in The Little Mermaid (1989) "blew [his] tiny 9-year-old mind".

The songs feature Foaʻi's New Zealand-based vocal group Te Vaka, as well as a choir from Fiji. The soundtrack contains seven original songs, two reprises, and two end-credits versions of songs from the film. Mancina composed the score and produced both the score and the songs. In addition to guitars and strings, the score features some vocals in Polynesian languages, as well as Polynesian percussion, woodwinds made from bamboo from the South Pacific, and traditional hide-covered Tyka drums.

According to Miranda, "Shiny" was inspired by the Flight of the Conchords' tribute to David Bowie at the Aspen Comedy Festival in 2004, as well as listening to Bowie's songs on a loop shortly after the singer's death in January 2016.

== Commercial performance ==
"How Far I'll Go" appears during the film performed by actress Auliʻi Cravalho, and during the end credits performed by Canadian singer-songwriter Alessia Cara. A music video for Cara's version of the song was released on November 3, 2016. It reached number 88 on the Billboard Hot 100 for the week of December 17, 2016. South African singer Lira and Filipino singer Janella Salvador recorded two English-language versions of "How Far I'll Go" that played over the end credits on the South African and Filipino release of the film, while Indonesian singer Maudy Ayunda and Malaysian singer Ayda Jebat recorded their own versions of the song respectively in Indonesian and Malaysian language.

Lin-Manuel Miranda and Jordan Fisher sing a duet on "You're Welcome", which plays over the end credits. The song as performed by Dwayne Johnson appears in the film. Johnson's version of "You're Welcome" peaked at number 83 on the Billboard Hot 100 for the week of December 17, 2016. The soundtrack also features Jemaine Clement, who voices the coconut crab Tamatoa.

The album sold 509,000 copies in the United States by April 2017, making it the third soundtrack to surpass a half-million in sales that year after Suicide Squad and Trolls. Moana sold 709,000 copies and earned 1,254,000 album-equivalents, finishing as the country's fifth-best-selling album of the year and had its ninth largest overall album consumption.

The album set a record for most weeks at No. 1 on Billboard Soundtracks Chart, with 61 weeks in total by October 23, 2021.

== Critical reception ==
Professional ratings
Review scores
Source	Rating
AllMusic	3/5 stars

Pablo Ruiz of Rotoscopers called Lin-Manuel Miranda "the perfect choice" to write the songs. He further wrote: "The result, accompanied by the score by Mark Mancina, is absolutely delightful. It might take some people a while to get used to the new rhythms, since this is not as Broadway-ish as Frozen, but I firmly believe we will all be singing these tunes for years and years to come."

== Accolades ==
At the 60th Annual Grammy Awards, "How Far I'll Go" won the Best Song Written For Visual Media. At the 74th Golden Globe Awards, it was nominated for Best Original Song. It also received a nomination for Best Original Song at the 89th Academy Awards.

== In popular culture ==
During an episode of WWE Raw on March 15, 2024, Maui's voice actor Dwayne "The Rock" Johnson—having returned to his part-time professional wrestling career and revived his villainous "Hollywood Rock" persona for the first time since 2003—vowed to injure Cody Rhodes and threatened Rhodes' mother by singing a line from the chorus of "You're Welcome" into the camera in a sinister fashion.

== Track listing ==
Disc one
No.	Title	Lyrics	Music	Performer(s)	Length
1.	"Tulou Tagaloa"	Opetaia Foaʻi	Foaʻi	Olivia Foa'i and Opetaia Foaʻi	0:51
2.	"An Innocent Warrior"	Foaʻi	Foaʻi	Vai Mahina, Sulata Foai-Amiatu and Matthew Ineleo	1:37
3.	"Where You Are"	Lin-Manuel Miranda	Miranda, Foaʻi and Mark Mancina	Christopher Jackson, Rachel House, Nicole Scherzinger, Auliʻi Cravalho and Louise Bush	3:30
4.	"How Far I'll Go"	Miranda	Miranda	Auliʻi Cravalho	2:43
5.	"We Know the Way"	Foaʻi and Miranda	Foaʻi	Opetaia Foaʻi and Lin-Manuel Miranda	2:21
6.	"How Far I'll Go (Reprise)"	Miranda	Miranda and Mancina	Auliʻi Cravalho	1:27
7.	"You're Welcome"	Miranda	Miranda	Dwayne Johnson	2:43
8.	"Shiny"	Miranda	Miranda and Mancina	Jemaine Clement	3:05
9.	"Logo Te Pate"	Foaʻi	Foaʻi	Olivia Foa'i, Opetaia Foaʻi and Talaga Steve Sale	2:10
10.	"I Am Moana (Song of the Ancestors)"	Miranda and Foaʻi	Miranda, Foaʻi and Mancina	Rachel House and Auliʻi Cravalho	2:42
11.	"Know Who You Are"	Foaʻi and Miranda	Foaʻi, Miranda and Mancina	Auliʻi Cravalho, Vai Mahina, Olivia Foa'i, Opetaia Foa'i and Matthew Ineleo	1:12
12.	"We Know the Way (Finale)"	Foaʻi and Miranda	Foaʻi	Lin-Manuel Miranda and Opetaia Foaʻi	1:09
13.	"How Far I'll Go (Alessia Cara version)"	Miranda	Miranda	Alessia Cara	2:55
14.	"You're Welcome" (featuring Lin-Manuel Miranda)	Miranda	Miranda	Jordan Fisher (produced by Illmind)	2:17
15.	"Prologue"		Mancina	Mark Mancina	2:25
16.	"He Was You"		Mancina	Mark Mancina	0:50
17.	"Village Crazy Lady"		Mancina	Mark Mancina	0:45
18.	"Cavern"		Mancina	Mark Mancina	2:05
19.	"The Ocean Chose You"		Mancina	Mark Mancina	1:17
20.	"The Hook"		Mancina	Mark Mancina	1:09
21.	"Tala's Deathbed"		Mancina	Mark Mancina	2:00
22.	"Battle of Wills"		Mancina	Mark Mancina	3:10
23.	"Kakamora"		Mancina	Mark Mancina	4:33
24.	"Wayfinding"		Mancina	Mark Mancina	1:52
25.	"Climbing"		Mancina	Mark Mancina	0:54
26.	"Tamatoa's Lair"		Mancina	Mark Mancina	2:46
27.	"Great Escape"		Mancina	Mark Mancina	0:59
28.	"If I Were the Ocean"		Mancina	Mark Mancina	3:01
29.	"Te Ka Attacks"		Mancina	Mark Mancina and Opetaia Foaʻi	1:41
30.	"Maui Leaves"		Mancina	Mark Mancina	2:05
31.	"Heartache"		Mancina	Mark Mancina	0:39
32.	"Tala Returns"		Mancina	Mark Mancina	1:01
33.	"Sails to Te Fiti"		Mancina	Mark Mancina and Opetaia Foaʻi	5:46
34.	"Shiny Heart"		Mancina	Mark Mancina	0:36
35.	"Te Fiti Restored"		Mancina	Mark Mancina and Opetaia Foaʻi	1:03
36.	"Hand of a God"		Mancina	Mark Mancina	0:30
37.	"Voyager Tagaloa"		Mancina	Mark Mancina and Opetaia Foaʻi	0:57
38.	"Toe Feiloa'i"		Mancina	Mark Mancina	1:25
39.	"Navigating Home"		Mancina	Mark Mancina	0:47
40.	"The Return to Voyaging"		Mancina	Mark Mancina and Opetaia Foaʻi	1:01
Total length:					1:15:48

Disc two
No.	Title	Lyrics	Music	Performer(s)	Length
1.	"Unstoppable" (outtake)	Lin-Manuel Miranda	Miranda, Opetaia Foaʻi and Mark Mancina	Lin-Manuel Miranda	3:59
2.	"More" (outtake)	Miranda	Miranda, Foaʻi and Mancina	Marcy Harriell	3:16
3.	"More (Reprise)" (outtake)	Miranda	Miranda, Foaʻi and Mancina	Marcy Harriell	2:38
4.	"Warrior Face" (outtake)	Miranda	Miranda	Lin-Manuel Miranda	2:16
5.	"Where You Are" (demo)	Miranda	Miranda, Foaʻi and Mancina	Lin-Manuel Miranda	3:01
6.	"You're Welcome" (demo)	Miranda	Miranda	Lin-Manuel Miranda	2:37
7.	"Shiny" (demo)	Miranda	Miranda and Mancina	Lin-Manuel Miranda	3:04
8.	"Prologue" (score demo)		Mancina	Mark Mancina	2:26
9.	"Village Crazy Lady" (score demo)		Mancina	Mark Mancina	0:45
10.	"Cavern" (score demo)		Mancina	Mark Mancina	2:05
11.	"Kakamora (Ocean Creatures)" (score demo)		Mancina	Mark Mancina	3:58
12.	"It's Called Wayfinding" (score demo)		Mancina	Mark Mancina	0:53
13.	"Maui Leaves" (score demo)		Mancina	Mark Mancina	2:04
14.	"Sails to Te Fiti" (score demo)		Mancina	Mark Mancina	1:37
15.	"Maui Battles" (score demo)		Mancina	Mark Mancina	1:57
16.	"Sea Monsters" (score demo)		Mancina	Mark Mancina	0:46
17.	"Tala Returns" (score demo)		Mancina	Mark Mancina	1:15
18.	"How Far I'll Go" (instrumental)	Miranda	Miranda	Lin-Manuel Miranda	2:44
19.	"You're Welcome" (instrumental)	Miranda	Miranda	Lin-Manuel Miranda	2:44
Total length:					44:04

== Charts ==
=== Weekly charts ===
Weekly chart performance for Moana: Original Motion Picture Soundtrack
Chart (2016–2017)	Peak position
Australian Albums (ARIA)	2
Austrian Albums (Ö3 Austria) Vaiana	8
Belgian Albums (Ultratop Flanders) Vaiana	49
Belgian Albums (Ultratop Wallonia) Vaiana	48
Canadian Albums (Billboard)	4
Danish Albums (Hitlisten) Vaiana	12
Dutch Albums (Album Top 100) Vaiana	50
French Albums (SNEP) Vaiana	20
German Albums (Offizielle Top 100) Vaiana	11
Irish Albums (Official Charts)	9
Italian Compilation Albums (FIMI) Oceania	3
New Zealand Albums (RMNZ)	1
Norwegian Albums (VG-lista) Vaiana	5
Polish Albums (ZPAV) Vaiana	39
Scottish Albums (Official Charts)	5
Spanish Albums (Promusicae) Vaiana	61
Swiss Albums (Schweizer Hitparade) Vaiana	18
UK Albums (Official Charts)	7
UK Soundtrack Albums (Official Charts)	1
US Billboard 200	2
US Kid Albums (Billboard)	1
US Soundtrack Albums (Billboard)	1

=== Year-end charts ===
2017 year-end chart performance for Moana: Original Motion Picture Soundtrack
Chart (2017)	Position
Australian Albums (ARIA)	5
Austrian Albums (Ö3 Austria) Vaiana	33
Belgian Albums (Ultratop Flanders) Vaiana	122
Belgian Albums (Ultratop Wallonia) Vaiana	159
Canadian Albums (Billboard)	10
Danish Albums (Hitlisten) Vaiana	37
Dutch Albums (MegaCharts) Vaiana	79
French Albums (SNEP) Vaiana	51
German Albums (Offizielle Top 100) Vaiana	78
New Zealand Albums (RMNZ)	4
Swiss Albums (Schweizer Hitparade) Vaiana	96
UK Albums (OCC)	12
US Billboard 200	6
US Soundtrack Albums (Billboard)	1

2018 year-end chart performance for Moana: Original Motion Picture Soundtrack
Chart (2018)	Position
Australian Albums (ARIA)	28
Danish Albums (Hitlisten) Vaiana	84
New Zealand Albums (RMNZ)	38
US Billboard 200	52
US Soundtrack Albums (Billboard)	4

2019 year-end chart performance for Moana: Original Motion Picture Soundtrack
Chart (2019)	Position
Australian Albums (ARIA)	64
US Billboard 200	81
US Soundtrack Albums (Billboard)	5

2020 year-end chart performance for Moana: Original Motion Picture Soundtrack
Chart (2020)	Position
Australian Albums (ARIA)	98
US Billboard 200	82
US Soundtrack Albums (Billboard)	3

2021 year-end chart performance for Moana: Original Motion Picture Soundtrack
Chart (2021)	Position
US Billboard 200	100
US Soundtrack Albums (Billboard)	1

2022 year-end chart performance for Moana: Original Motion Picture Soundtrack
Chart (2022)	Position
US Billboard 200	110
US Soundtrack Albums (Billboard)	2

2023 year-end chart performance for Moana: Original Motion Picture Soundtrack
Chart (2023)	Position
US Billboard 200	146
US Soundtrack Albums (Billboard)	2

2024 year-end chart performance for Moana: Original Motion Picture Soundtrack
Chart (2024)	Position
US Billboard 200	161
US Soundtrack Albums (Billboard)	2

2025 year-end chart performance for Moana: Original Motion Picture Soundtrack
Chart (2025)	Position
Belgian Albums (Ultratop Wallonia) Vaiana	191
US Billboard 200	178
US Soundtrack Albums (Billboard)	4

=== Decade-end charts ===
Decade-end chart performance for Moana: Original Motion Picture Soundtrack
Chart (2010–2019)	Position
Australian Albums (ARIA)	100
US Billboard 200	42

=== Tracks ===
Chart performance for tracks from Moana: Original Motion Picture Soundtrack
Track title	Performer(s)	Peak positions				
Track title	Performer(s)	US	AUS	CAN	NZ	UK
"How Far I'll Go"	Auliʻi Cravalho	41	49	58	— (Note: "How Far I'll Go" did not enter the NZ Top 40 Singles Chart, but peaked at number one on the NZ Heatseekers Singles Chart.)	55
"How Far I'll Go"	Alessia Cara	56	15	46	3	49
"You're Welcome"	Dwayne Johnson	65	77	85	— (Note: "You're Welcome" did not enter the NZ Top 40 Singles Chart, but peaked at number three on the NZ Heatseekers Singles Chart.)	—
"We Know the Way"	Opetaia Foaʻi & Lin-Manuel Miranda	93	—	—	— (Note: "We Know the Way" did not enter the NZ Top 40 Singles Chart, but peaked at number two on the NZ Heatseekers Singles Chart.)	—
"Shiny"	Jemaine Clement	— (Note: "Shiny" did not enter the Billboard Hot 100, but peaked at number six on the Bubbling Under Hot 100 Singles chart.)	—	—	— (Note: "Shiny" did not enter the NZ Top 40 Singles Chart, but peaked at number five on the NZ Heatseekers Singles Chart.)	—
"Where You Are"	Christopher Jackson, Rachel House, Nicole Scherzinger, Auliʻi Cravalho & Louise Bush	—	—	—	— (Note: "Where You Are" did not enter the NZ Top 40 Singles Chart, but peaked at number six on the NZ Heatseekers Singles Chart.)	—
"I Am Moana (Song of the Ancestors)"	Rachel House & Auliʻi Cravalho	—	—	—	— (Note: "I Am Moana (Song of the Ancestors)" did not enter the NZ Top 40 Singles Chart, but peaked at number eight on the NZ Heatseekers Singles Chart.)	—
"—" denotes a recording that did not chart.

== Certifications ==
Certifications for Moana: Original Motion Picture Soundtrack
Region	Certification	Certified units/sales
Australia (ARIA)	Platinum	70,000^{‡}
Austria (IFPI Austria)	Platinum	15,000^{*}
Canada (Music Canada)	2× Platinum	160,000^{‡}
Denmark (IFPI Danmark)	2× Platinum	40,000^{‡}
France (SNEP)	2× Platinum	200,000^{‡}
Germany (BVMI)	Platinum	200,000^{‡}
Italy (FIMI)	Gold	25,000^{‡}
Mexico (AMPROFON)	Gold	30,000^{‡}
New Zealand (RMNZ)	5× Platinum	75,000^{‡}
Poland (ZPAV)	Platinum	20,000^{‡}
Singapore (RIAS)	Platinum	10,000^{*}
Sweden (GLF)	Gold	15,000^{‡}
United Kingdom (BPI)	2× Platinum	600,000^{‡}
United States (RIAA)	5× Platinum	5,000,000^{‡}
^{*} Sales figures based on certification alone.^{‡} Sales+streaming figures based on certification alone.
