= Olivia Foa'i =

New Zealand musician

Olivia Foaʻi is a New Zealand musician of Polynesian descent. She is known for her work with the group Te Vaka, including on the soundtrack of Disney's Moana, as well as her solo career, particularly her efforts to revive songwriting in the Tokelauan language.

== Biography ==
Foaʻi was born in New Zealand in the mid-1990s, and she grew up in Auckland. She is of Tokelauan, Tuvaluan, and British heritage.

Her father is the musician and producer Opetaia Foaʻi, the founder of the group Te Vaka, and her mother is Julie Foaʻi, the band's manager. She began performing with Te Vaka at a young age, touring with the group around the world.

Alongside fellow members of Te Vaka, she was featured prominently as a singer on several of the tracks for the 2016 Disney film Moana, including the opening song "Tulou Tagaloa". That song earned her the award for Best Pacific Language Song at the 2017 Pacific Music Awards.

Foaʻi then branched out on her own, releasing her first solo album, Candid, in 2019. Her solo music combines Polynesian music, pop, and R&B.

She has since been described as "one of the Pacific's most prominent singers". In 2020, she was named Best Female Artist at the Pacific Music Awards for her album Candid. The album was also named Best Pacific Language and Best Pacific Music Album. She won Best Female Artist again as well as Best Pacific Language in 2023 for her single "Sunlight".

Having heard her aunt singing in Tokelauan growing up, Foaʻi was inspired to incorporate her Tokelauan heritage into her music. In 2023, she released her first song fully in Tokelauan, "Mai Anamua".

In November 2023, she released her second album, Tūmau Pea, meaning 'Everlasting'.

In 2024, she returned with her family for the soundtrack to the Moana sequel, Moana 2. She is the lead singer for various songs on the soundtrack, including "Finding the Way" and "Tulou Tagaloa." Her work was also featured in the 2026 live-action remake of the original film, also titled Moana.

Foaʻi is currently based in Australia.

== Discography ==
=== Studio albums ===
- Candid (2019)
- Tūmau Pea (2023)
