= Te Vaka =

Oceanic musical group

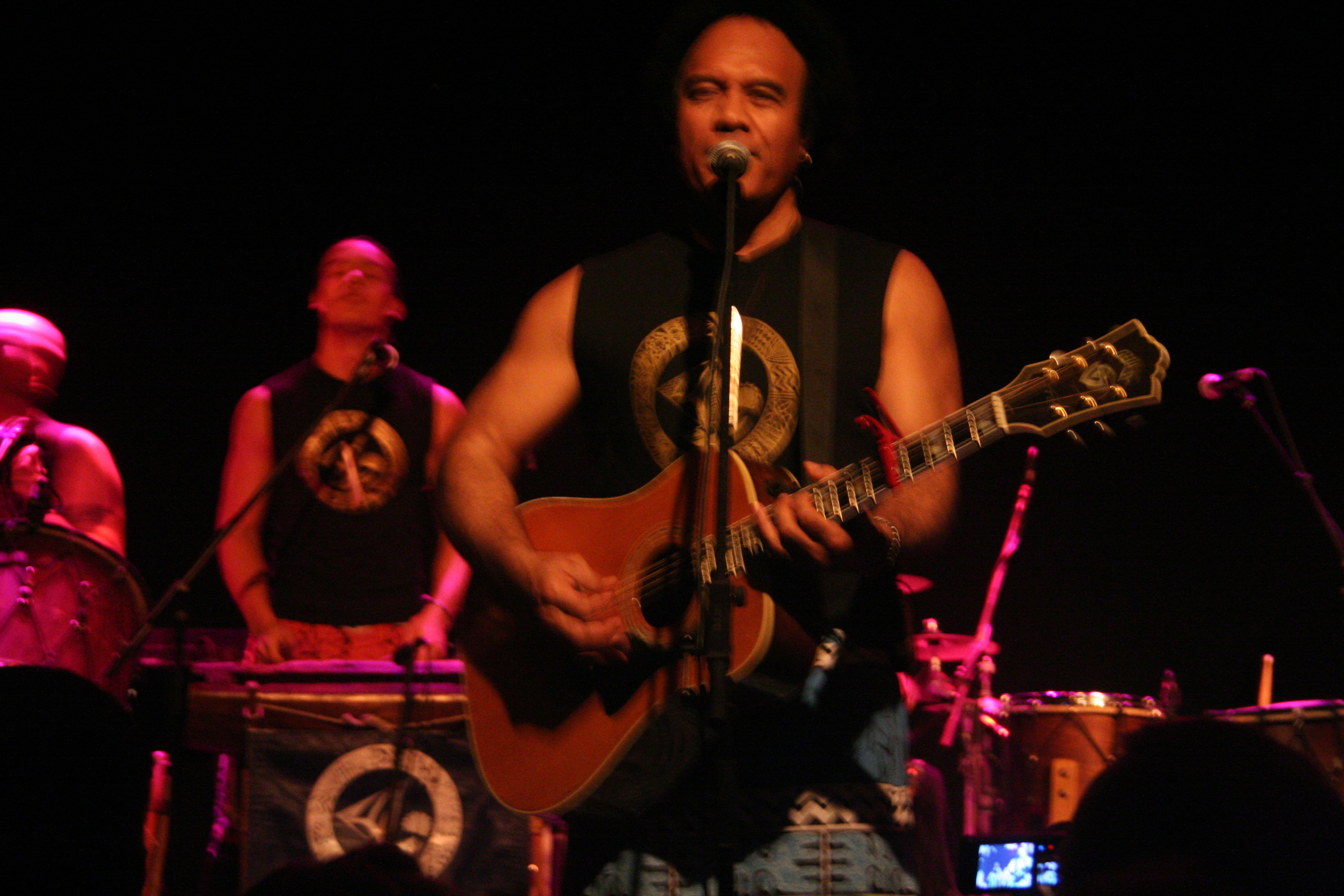
- Te Vaka performing at Brotfabrik in 2007

Background information
- Origin: New Zealand
- Genre: South Pacific Fusion
- Years active: 1995–present
- Label: Warm Earth
- Members: Opetaia Foaʻi; Olivia Foaʻi; Matatia Foaʻi; Sulata Foai-Amiatu; Douglas Bernard; Joe Toomata; Neil Forrest; Etueni (Edwin) Pita; Dave Kuresa
- Past members: Alana Foai-Auimatagi; Melodee Panapa-Leilua; Malcolm Lakatani; Jeff Harris; Talaga Sale; Simon Hope; Etueni Pita; Tremayne Lihou
- Website: www.tevaka.com

Te Vaka (English: The Canoe) is an Oceanic music group that performs original contemporary Pacific music or "South Pacific Fusion". The group was founded in 1995 by singer and songwriter Opetaia Foaʻi in New Zealand. They have toured the world consistently since 1997 and have won a number of awards including the "Best Pacific Music Album" award from the New Zealand Music Awards for their albums Tutuki (2004), Olatia (2007), and Amataga (2015), alongside awards such as "Best Pacific Group" in the 2008 Pacific Music Awards. According to the BBC, they are "the world's most successful band playing original contemporary Pacific music."

== History ==
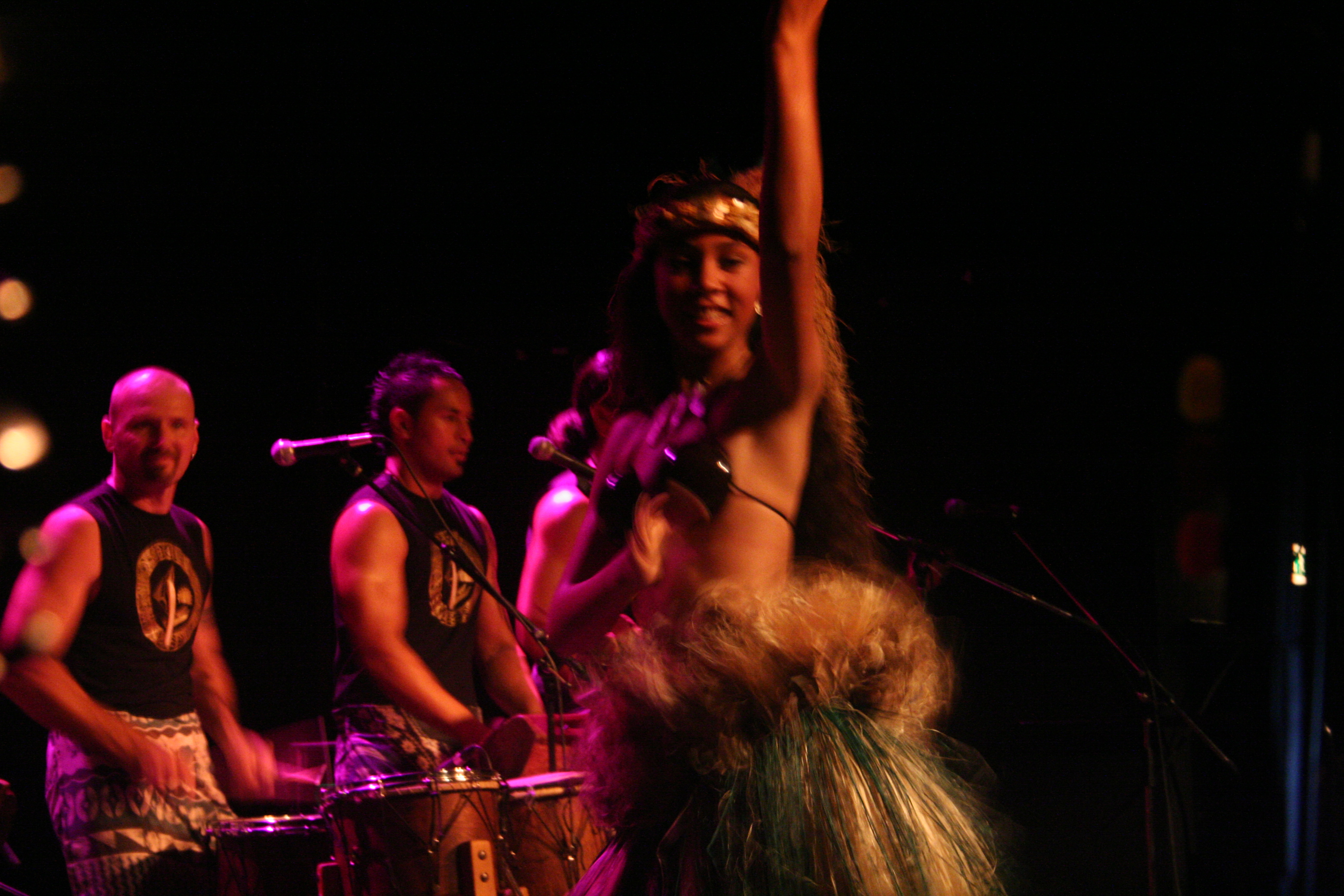
Te Vaka performing at Brotfabrik in 2007

Te Vaka is a group of musicians and dancers with origins from various Polynesian backgrounds (including Tokelau, Tuvalu, Samoa and New Zealand) that formed in the 1990s, under the leadership of award-winning songwriter, Opetaia Foaʻi. That year, they released their eponymous debut album through ARC Music, a UK/European record company. The album gained immediate success and recognition, being distributed to over 80 countries. Their follow-up album, Ki Mua, was released through Warm Earth Records, and went #1 on world music charts and mainstream radio in the South Pacific.

In 2002, the band released their third album, Nukukehe. The album gained the group a nomination in the New Zealand Music Awards and the BBC Radio 3 Awards for World Music. Their next albums entered the European World Music Charts, as well as winning numerous awards.

Through their career, Te Vaka has performed extensively around the world, performing in London's Royal Festival Hall and Ronnie Scott's Jazz Club, as well as headlining music festivals throughout Europe like WOMAD. They have also performed at the APEC ministerial dinners and America's Cup events in Auckland, the Commonwealth Games in Melbourne, the Rugby World Cup in Paris and the Olympic Games in Beijing. Te Vaka toured the world extensively performing in 40 countries between 1997 and 2018.

In 2010 and 2011, the band completed two tours in North America. That same year, Te Vaka released their seventh album, Havili.

In 2015, the band was selected by Walt Disney Pictures to contribute to the soundtrack of the 2016 animated film Moana, and later contributed to songs and the soundtrack for its 2024 sequel, Moana 2.

== Musical style ==
Te Vaka uses traditional musical instruments from the Pacific region like pate (single and double log drums), paʻu (indigenous goat skin conga), and bass drums.

Most of their songs are written in the Tokelauan language, reflecting the heritage of band founder, singer, and main songwriter, Opetaia Foaʻi. Foaʻi was born in Western Samoa, to a Tokelauan father and a Tuvaluan mother, and raised in a Tokelauan community in New Zealand. He has said that the inspiration for his music comes from his multi-cultural upbringing. However, some songs are also written in Samoan and Tuvaluan languages, which are the native tongues of most of the other band members.

As a result of this mixture of sounds and diversity of influences, their music has been referred to as "a truly pan-Pacific sound".

== Current lineup ==
- Opetaia Foaʻi: vocals, guitar, percussion
- Olivia Foa'i: vocals, dance
- Matatia Foa'i: percussion
- Sulata Foai-Amiatu: vocals
- Douglas Bernard (a.k.a. D.Burn): vocals, keyboards, percussion
- Joe Toomata: electric guitar, percussion
- Neil Forrest: bass, flute, percussion
- Etueni (Edwin) Pita: dance
- Dave Kuresa: dance

== Awards and nominations ==
Year	Nominee / work	Award	Result
2000	Ki Mua	New Zealand Music Awards - International Achievement	Nominated
2002		BBC Radio 3 Awards for World Music	Nominated
2003	Te Vaka	BBC Radio 3 Awards for World Music - Audience Award	Nominated
2003	Nukukehe	New Zealand Music Awards - Best Roots Album	Nominated
2004	Tutuki	New Zealand Music Awards - Best Pacific Music Album	Won
2005	Opetaia Foaʻi	Senior Pacific Artist	Won
2008	Te Vaka	Pacific Music Awards - Best Pacific Band	Won
2008	Olatia	Pacific Music Awards - Best Pacific Album	Won
2008	Te Vaka	Australian Songwriters Association Awards - Best Live Performance of the Night	Won
2008	"Tamahana"	Australian Songwriters Association Awards - International	Won
2010	Haoloto	New Zealand Music Awards	Nominated
2010	Te Vaka	Pacific Music Awards - Best Pacific Group	Won
2010	Haoloto	Best Pacific Language Album	Won
2011	Haoloto	Hawaiian Music Awards - Polynesian	Won
2012	Havili	Pacific Music Awards	Nominated
2012	"Lovely World"	ISC Awards - World Music	Nominated
2016	Amataga	Pacific Music Awards - Best Pacific Album	Won
2016	"Papua I Sisifo"	Pacific Music Awards - Best Pacific Song	Won

== Discography ==
=== Studio albums ===
- 1997 Te Vaka
- 1999 Ki Mua
- 2002 Nukukehe
- 2004 Tutuki
- 2007 Olatia
- 2009 Haoloto
- 2011 Havili
- 2015 Amataga
- 2017 Te Vaka Beats: Percussion Album Vol. 1
- 2020 Te Vaka Beats Vol. 2
- 2022 Te Vaka Beats Vol. 3

=== Compilations ===
- 2017 Greatest Hits: Songs That Inspired Moana

=== DVDs ===
- 2003 Live at Apia Park
- 2007 Live in Concert 2006

=== Singles ===
- "Lakalaka"

=== Filmography ===
- Moana - contributed to the film's soundtrack
- Moana 2 (soundtrack) - contributed to the film's soundtrack
