= Abigail Barlow =

American singer-songwriter

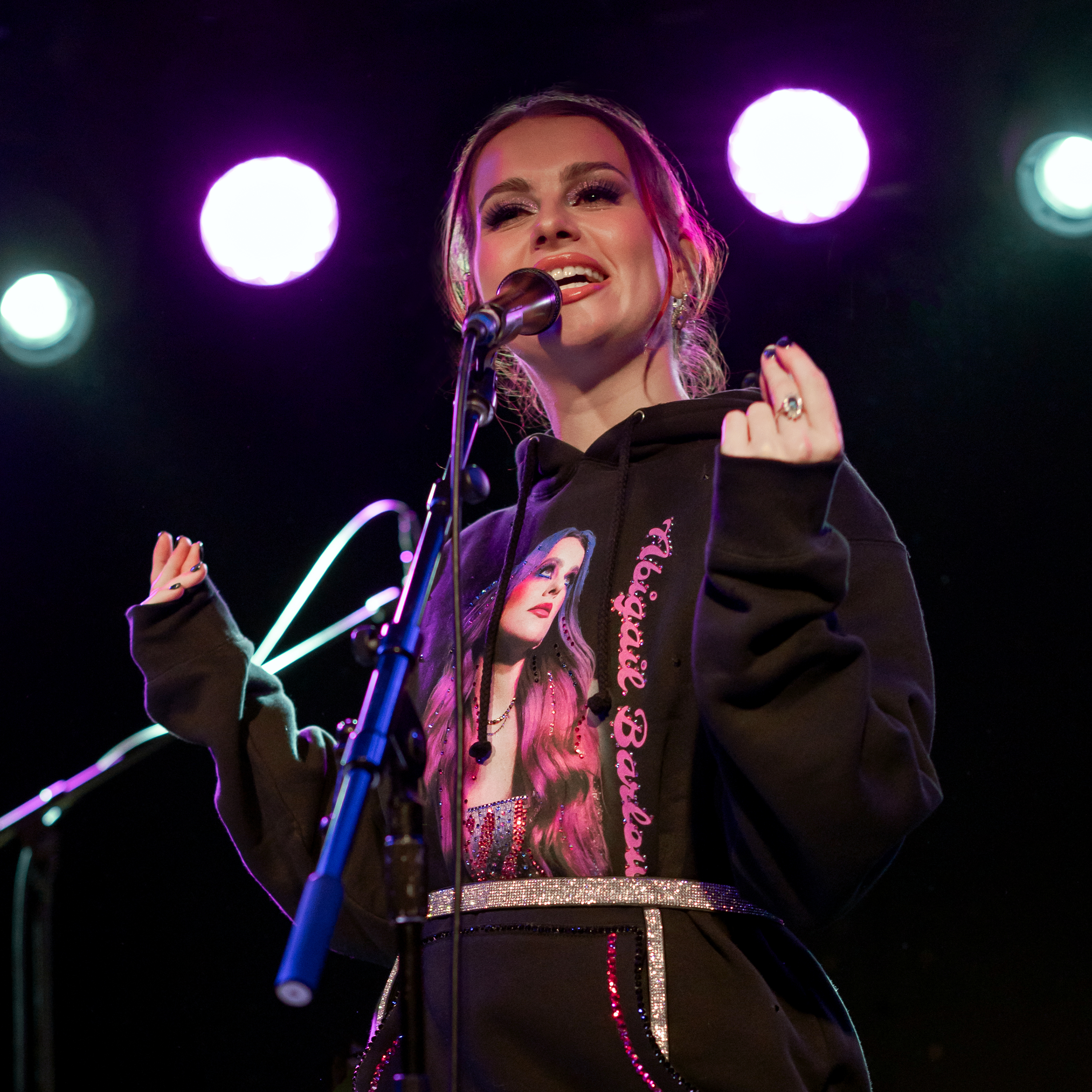
- Barlow in February 2024
- Born: November 10, 1998 (age 28); Jackson, Mississippi, U.S.
- Notable work: The Unofficial Bridgerton Musical
- Relatives: Anna Grace Barlow (sister)
- Awards: Grammy Award for Best Musical Theater Album
- Website: https://www.abigailbarlowmusic.com/

Abigail Barlow is an American singer-songwriter and actress. She shared a Grammy Award for Best Musical Theater Album in 2022 for The Unofficial Bridgerton Musical, co-written with Emily Bear. Barlow and Bear also wrote songs for the Disney animated film Moana 2 (2024). Barlow portrayed the role of Katherine Howard in the musical Six on Broadway and departed the show August 16, 2026.

== Early life and education ==
Barlow was born in Jackson, Mississippi, but moved to Birmingham, Alabama, in first grade. She graduated from the Alabama School of Fine Arts and trained at Birmingham Dance Theatre.

== Career ==
=== 2022–2024 ===
Her album The Unofficial Bridgerton Musical, co-written with and produced by, Emily Bear, won the Grammy Award for Best Musical Theater Album in 2022. She is also known for her independent pop hit “Heartbreak Hotel,” which peaked at #2 on iTunes and has more than 6.5 million streams. She and Bear were honored by the Songwriters Hall of Fame and named to the Forbes 30 Under 30 list. She has more than 2.4 million TikTok followers. Barlow has collaborated with Meghan Trainor, who co-wrote and produced a track on Barlow's self-titled debut EP in 2020 titled Phantom Feelings.

In July 2022, Bear and Barlow performed their Bridgerton album live in concert with the National Symphony Orchestra, conducted by Steven Reineke, at the Kennedy Center. Guest soloists included Ephraim Sykes, Denée Benton and Kelli O'Hara. In late July 2022, Netflix sued Barlow and Bear in U.S. federal court for copyright infringement, claiming that they had objected to live concerts of the album. The company discontinued the lawsuit in September 2022 after a reported settlement.

Also in 2022, Barlow and Bear were engaged by Taco Bell to write the music for Mexican Pizza: The Musical, with a book by Hannah Friedman, which featured Doja Cat and Dolly Parton. The satirical musical's true story concerns a fan-favorite item at Taco Bell, Mexican pizza, which was removed from, and later returned to, its menus. The musical streamed on Taco Bell's TikTok and YouTube accounts on September 15, 2022.

=== 2024–present ===
Barlow and Bear wrote songs for the Disney film Moana 2. Two of their songs, "Beyond" and "Can I Get a Chee Hoo?", were nominated for the 2024 Hollywood Music in Media Award for Best Original Song in an Animated Film, and "Beyond" was nominated for a 2025 Society of Composers & Lyricists Award for Outstanding Original Song for a Comedy or Musical Visual Media Production. Barlow and Bear are the youngest composers, and the first female writing team for an animated Disney movie.

Barlow made her Broadway acting debut as Catherine Howard in the musical Six at the Lena Horne Theatre on February 16, 2026. In 2026, she wrote the score (with Bear) and script (with Julia Aks) for To Die for Love, a musical scheduled to be available on TikTok on December 21, 2026. She also stars in the musical, which is produced by TikTok and Ampersand, led by Agnes Chu; a soundtrack is set to be released by Atlantic Records.
