= World Doctors Orchestra =

The World Doctors Orchestra (WDO) is an orchestra made up entirely of physicians. It was established as a non-profit organization in 2008 by Prof. Stefan Willich at the Charité University Medical Center in Berlin, Germany with the purpose of combining music with global medical responsibility. The proceeds from every concert session go to selected non-profit medical aid organizations.
