= Opetaia Foaʻi =

Polynesian musician, composer and singer

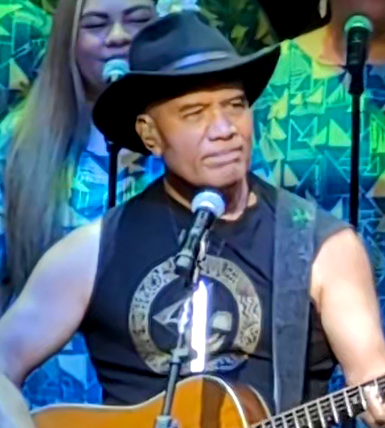
Opetaia Foaʻi in 2026

Opetaia Foaʻi (born 1956) is a Tokelauan-Tuvaluan composer, musician, and singer who was born in Samoa, grew up in New Zealand and now lives in Australia. He is best known as the founder of the Polynesian band Te Vaka, and for his collaboration with Lin-Manuel Miranda on the music for the Disney film Moana (2016). He also worked on the music for its 2024 sequel and live-action remake.

== Biography ==
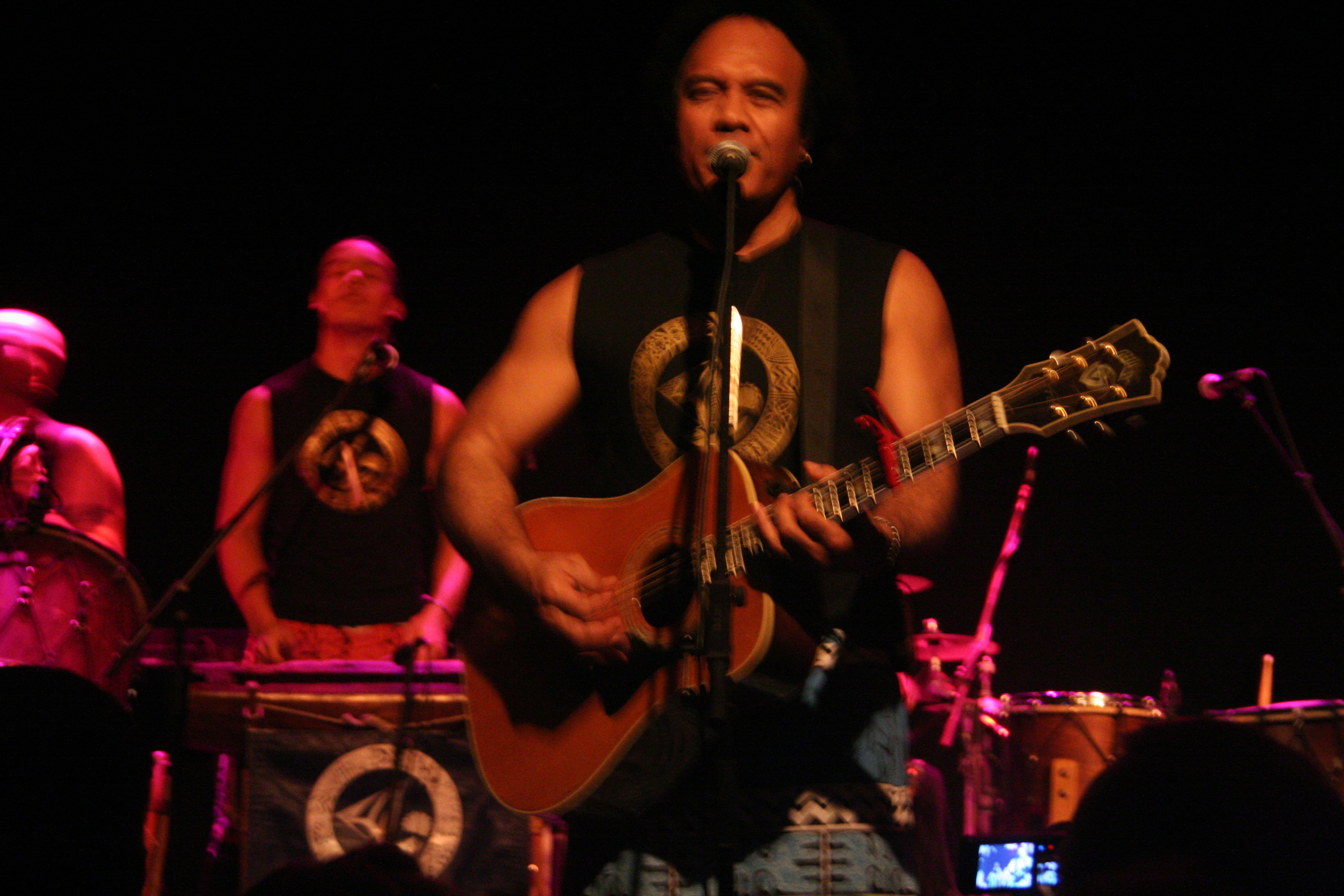
Opetaia Foaʻi in 2007

Foaʻi was born in Alamagoto in Samoa to Tokelauan and Tuvalan parents. He moved to New Zealand at the age of 9, where he was educated at Grey Lynn Primary School, Pasadena Intermediate School, and Kelston Boys' High School. He began compusing in 1994, and his first song was "Ki te la". He founded the band Te Vaka, which released its first album in 1997. He is married and has 4 children in total, including Olivia Foa'i and Matatia Foa'i. He composed the Samoan and Tokelauan language songs Logo te Pate, An Innocent Warrior and We Know the Way (English Lyrics by Lin-Manuel Miranda) for the Disney film Moana. He currently lives in Australia. He was the Arts Pasifika Award winner of the Senior Pacific Artist Award in 2005. He was the second place winner of the 2004 International Songwriting Competition in the World Music category and the 2008 first place winner for the song Tamahana.

He was awarded a Special Recognition Award for outsrtanding achievement at the 2017 Pacific Music Awards. In 2025 he was awarded a lifetime achievement award by the Pacific Music Awards Trust. In 2026 he was awarded a billions award for "We Know the Way".
