= British Academy Children's Award for Feature Film =

British Academy Children and Young People Award for Feature Film
- Awarded for: The best feature length content of any genre with a specific appeal to children and young people.
- Country: United Kingdom
- Presented by: British Academy of Film and Television Arts
- Currently held by: Wolfwalkers (2022)
- Website: www.bafta.org/children

The British Academy Children and Young People Award for Feature Film is an award presented annually by the British Academy of Film and Television Arts (BAFTA). It is given to "feature length content of any genre with a specific appeal to children and young people". Films with a certificate of U, PG, 12, 12A or 15 may be considered. The category includes international films that have been released in the United Kingdom on any platform. It was first presented at the 4th British Academy Children's Awards in 1999, with American comedy film Paulie being the first recipient.

While no film can win the award more than once, several film series have been nominated multiple times such as the entire The Lord of the Rings film series, seven out of eight of the Harry Potter films, and three of the four Toy Story films. Out of the twenty-two winners, fourteen have been animated films while eight have been live-action ones.

== Winners and nominees ==
=== 1990s ===
Year	Film	Recipient(s)	Studio(s)
1999 (4th)	Paulie	Mark Gordon, Gary Levinsohn, Allison Lyon Segan, John Roberts	DreamWorks Pictures
1999 (4th)	A Bug's Life	Darla K. Anderson, Kevin Reher, John Lasseter	Pixar, Walt Disney Pictures
1999 (4th)	Dr. Dolittle	John Davis, Joseph M. Singer, David T. Friendly, Betty Thomas	20th Century Fox
1999 (4th)	The Rugrats Movie	Arlene Klasky, Gabor Csupo, Norton Virgien, Igor Kovalyov	Paramount Pictures, Nickelodeon Movies

=== 2000s ===
Year	Film	Recipient(s)	Studio(s)
2000 (5th)	The Iron Giant	Allison Abbate, Des McAnuff, Brad Bird, Tim McCanlies	Warner Bros. Animation
2000 (5th)	Chicken Run	Peter Lord, Dave Sproxton, Nick Park, Karey Kirkpatrick	Aardman Animations, DreamWorks Animation
2000 (5th)	Stuart Little	Douglas Wick, Rob Minkoff, M. Night Shyamalan, Greg Brooker	Columbia Pictures
2000 (5th)	Toy Story 2	Helene Plotkin, Karen Robert Jackson, John Lasseter	Pixar, Walt Disney Pictures
2001 (6th)	Shrek	Andrew Adamson, Vicky Jenson, Aron Warner, Jeffrey Katzenberg	DreamWorks Animation
2001 (6th)	The Emperor's New Groove	Randy Fullmer, Mark Dindal, David Reynolds	Walt Disney Animation Studios
2001 (6th)	How the Grinch Stole Christmas	Brian Grazer, Ron Howard, Jeffrey Price, Peter S. Seaman	Universal Pictures
2001 (6th)	Spy Kids	Elizabeth Avellan, Robert Rodriguez	Troublemaker Studios, Dimension Films
2002 (7th)	Monsters, Inc.	Darla K. Anderson, Pete Docter, Andrew Stanton, Daniel Gerson	Pixar
2002 (7th)	Harry Potter and the Philosopher's Stone	David Heyman, Chris Columbus, Steve Kloves	Warner Bros. Pictures
2002 (7th)	The Lord of the Rings: The Fellowship of the Ring	Peter Jackson, Barrie M. Osborne, Fran Walsh, Tim Sanders	New Line Cinema
2002 (7th)	Stuart Little 2	Douglas Wick, Lucy Fisher, Rob Minkoff, Bruce Joel Rubin	Columbia Pictures
2003 (8th)	Whale Rider	Tim Sanders, John Barnett, Frank Hübner, Niki Caro	South Pacific Pictures
2003 (8th)	Harry Potter and the Chamber of Secrets	David Heyman, Chris Columbus, Steve Kloves	Warner Bros. Pictures
2003 (8th)	The Lord of the Rings: The Two Towers	Peter Jackson, Barrie M. Osborne, Fran Walsh	New Line Cinema
2003 (8th)	The Wild Thornberrys Movie	Arlene Klasky, Gabor Csupo, Jeff McGrath, Cathy Malkasian	Paramount Pictures, Nickelodeon Movies
2004 (9th)	Harry Potter and the Prisoner of Azkaban	David Heyman, Chris Columbus, Mark Radcliffe, Alfonso Cuarón	Warner Bros. Pictures
2004 (9th)	Finding Nemo	Graham Walters, Andrew Stanton, Lee Unkrich	Pixar
2004 (9th)	The Lord of the Rings: The Return of the King	Barrie M. Osborne, Peter Jackson, Fran Walsh	New Line Cinema
2004 (9th)	Shrek 2	Andrew Adamson, Conrad Vernon, Kelly Asbury	DreamWorks Animation
2005 (10th)	The Incredibles	John Walker, Brad Bird	Pixar
2005 (10th)	Charlie and the Chocolate Factory	Richard D. Zanuck, Tim Burton	Warner Bros. Pictures
2005 (10th)	The Polar Express	Steve Starkey, Robert Zemeckis	Warner Bros. Pictures
2005 (10th)	Shark Tale		DreamWorks Animation
2006 (11th)	Wallace & Gromit: The Curse of the Were-Rabbit	Nick Park, Steve Box, Peter Lord, David Sproxton	Aardman Animations, DreamWorks Animation
2006 (11th)	The Chronicles of Narnia: The Lion, the Witch and the Wardrobe	Mark Johnson, Andrew Adamson	Walt Disney Pictures
2006 (11th)	Pirates of the Caribbean: Dead Man's Chest	Jerry Bruckheimer, Gore Verbinski, Ted Elliot, Terry Rossio	Walt Disney Pictures
2006 (11th)	Harry Potter and the Goblet of Fire	David Heyman, Mike Newell, Steve Kloves	Warner Bros. Pictures
2007 (12th)	Happy Feet	George Miller, Bill Miller, Doug Mitchell	Warner Bros. Pictures
2007 (12th)	Bridge to Terabithia	Hal Lieberman, Lauren Levine, David L. Paterson, Gábor Csupó	Walt Disney Pictures
2007 (12th)	Flushed Away	Peter Lord, Cecil Kramer, Sam Fell, David Bowers	Aardman Animations, DreamWorks Animation
2007 (12th)	Harry Potter and the Order of the Phoenix	David Heyman, David Barron, David Yates, Michael Goldenberg	Warner Bros. Pictures
2008 (13th)	WALL-E	Jim Morris, Andrew Stanton	Pixar
2008 (13th)	Horton Hears a Who!	Steve Martino, Jimmy Hayward	20th Century Fox
2008 (13th)	Ratatouille	Brad Lewis, Brad Bird, Jan Pinkava	Pixar
2008 (13th)	Stardust	Matthew Vaughn, Lorenzo Di Bonaventura, Michael Dreyer, Neil Gaiman	Paramount Pictures
2009 (14th)	Coraline	Bill Mechanic, Henry Selick, Claire Jennings, Mary Sandell	Laika
2009 (14th)	Bolt	Clark Spencer, Chris Williams, Byron Howard, Dan Fogelman	Walt Disney Animation Studios
2009 (14th)	High School Musical 3: Senior Year	Bill Borden, Barry Rosenbush, Kenny Ortega, Peter Barsocchini	Walt Disney Pictures
2009 (14th)	Ice Age: Dawn of the Dinosaurs	Lori Forte, John C. Donkin, Carlos Saldanha, Mike Thurmeier	Blue Sky, 20th Century Fox

=== 2010s ===
Year	Film	Recipient(s)	Studio(s)
2010 (15th)	Up	Jonas Rivera, Pete Docter, Bob Peterson	Pixar
2010 (15th)	Fantastic Mr. Fox	Wes Anderson, Allison Abbate, Scott Rudin, Jeremy Dawson	20th Century Fox
2010 (15th)	Nanny McPhee and the Big Bang	Lindsay Doran, Eric Fellner, Susanna White, Emma Thompson	Universal Pictures
2010 (15th)	Toy Story 3	Darla K. Anderson, Lee Unkrich, Michael Arndt	Pixar
2011 (16th)	Harry Potter and the Deathly Hallows: Part 2	David Barron, David Heyman, J. K. Rowling, David Yates	Warner Bros. Pictures
2011 (16th)	Kung Fu Panda 2	Jonathan Aibel, Glenn Berger, Melissa Cobb, Jennifer Yuh Nelson	DreamWorks Animation
2011 (16th)	Harry Potter and the Deathly Hallows : Part 1	David Barron, David Heyman, J. K. Rowling, David Yates	Warner Bros. Pictures
2011 (16th)	Tangled	Roy Conli, Dan Fogelman, Nathan Greno, Byron Howard	Walt Disney Animation Studios
2012 (17th)	The Hunger Games	Gary Ross, Nina Jacobson, Jon Kilik	Lionsgate
2012 (17th)	Arthur Christmas	Peter Lord, Sarah Smith, Peter Baynham	Sony Pictures Animation, Aardman Animations
2012 (17th)	Hugo	Martin Scorsese, Graham King, Tim Headington, Johnny Depp	Paramount Pictures
2012 (17th)	The Muppets	David Hoberman, Todd Lieberman, James Bobin	Walt Disney Pictures
2013 (18th)	Life of Pi	Ang Lee, Gil Netter, David Womark	20th Century Fox
2013 (18th)	Brave	Mark Andrews, Brenda Chapman, John Lasseter	Pixar
2013 (18th)	ParaNorman	Arianne Sutner, Travis Knight, Sam Fell, Chris Butler	Laika
2013 (18th)	Wreck-It Ralph	Rich Moore, Clark Spencer, John Lasseter	Walt Disney Animation Studios
2014 (19th)	The Lego Movie	Phil Lord, Christopher Miller, Dan Lin, Roy Lee	Warner Animation Group
2014 (19th)	Frozen	Peter Del Vecho, Jennifer Lee, Chris Buck	Walt Disney Pictures
2014 (19th)	How to Train Your Dragon 2	Dean DeBlois, Bonnie Arnold	DreamWorks Animation
2014 (19th)	Maleficent	Joe Roth, Robert Stromberg, Linda Woolverton	Walt Disney Pictures
2015 (20th)	Paddington	Paul King, David Heyman	StudioCanal
2015 (20th)	Big Hero 6	Roy Conli, Chris Williams, Don Hall	Walt Disney Animation Studios
2015 (20th)	Inside Out	Pete Docter, Ronnie del Carmen, Jonas Rivera	Pixar
2015 (20th)	Shaun the Sheep Movie	Mark Burton, Richard Starzak, Julie Lockhart, Paul Kewley	Aardman Animations
2016 (21st)	Zootropolis	Byron Howard, Rich Moore, Clark Spencer	Walt Disney Animation Studios
2016 (21st)	The Jungle Book	Jon Favreau, Brigham Taylor	Walt Disney Pictures
2016 (21st)	Star Wars: The Force Awakens	J.J. Abrams, Lawrence Kasdan, Kathleen Kennedy, Bryan Burk	Walt Disney Pictures
2016 (21st)	The Good Dinosaur	Peter Sohn, Meg LeFauve	Walt Disney Animation Studios
2017 (22nd)	The Little Prince	Mark Osborne, Aton Soumache, Alexis Vonarb, Dimitri Rassam	On Animation Studios, Netflix
2017 (22nd)	Kubo and the Two Strings	Travis Knight, Arianne Sutner	Laika
2017 (22nd)	Moana	Ron Clements, John Musker, Osnat Shurer	Walt Disney Animation Studios
2017 (22nd)	Sing	Chris Meledandri, Janet Healy, Garth Jennings	Illumination Entertainment
2018 (23rd)	Paddington 2	Paul King, Simon Farnaby, David Heyman	StudioCanal
2018 (23rd)	Coco	Lee Unkrich, Darla K. Anderson	Pixar
2018 (23rd)	The Greatest Showman	Michael Gracey, Laurence Mark, Peter Chernin, Jenno Topping	20th Century Fox
2018 (23rd)	Incredibles 2	Brad Bird, John Walker, Nicole Grindle	Pixar
2019 (24th)	Spider-Man: Into the Spider-Verse	Bob Persichetti, Peter Ramsey, Rodney Rothman, Phil Lord	Sony Pictures Animation
2019 (24th)	Horrible Histories: The Movie – Rotten Romans	Will Clarke, Caroline Norris, Dominic Brigstocke	Altitude Film Distribution, BBC Films
2019 (24th)	Mary Poppins Returns	Rob Marshall, John Deluca, Marc Platt	Walt Disney Pictures
2019 (24th)	Toy Story 4	Josh Cooley, Jonas Rivera, Mark Nielsen	Pixar

=== 2020s ===
Year	Film	Recipient(s)	Studio(s)
2022 (25th)	Wolfwalkers	Will Collins, Tomm Moore, Ross Stewart	Cartoon Saloon, Apple TV+
2022 (25th)	Klaus	Sergio Pablos, Jinko Gotoh	Netflix
2022 (25th)	The Mitchells vs. the Machines	Mike Rianda, Phil Lord, Christopher Miller, Kurt Albrecht	Netflix
2022 (25th)	Over the Moon	Glen Keane, Gennie Rim, Peilin Chou	Netflix

- Note: The films that don't have recipients on the tables had Production team credited as recipients for the award or nomination.
