= BAFTA Award for Best Animated Film =

British film industry award

- Awarded for: Excellence in animated films
- Country: United Kingdom
- Presented by: British Academy of Film and Television Arts
- First award: 1955
- Currently held by: Zootopia 2 (2025)
- Website: https://www.bafta.org/awards/film/animated-film

The BAFTA Award for Best Animated Film is a film award presented by the British Academy of Film and Television Arts (BAFTA) at the annual British Academy Film Awards. BAFTA is a British organisation that hosts annual awards shows for film, television, and video games (and formerly also for children's film and television).

The original version of the category, introduced in the 1955 ceremony and awarded until the 1982 ceremony, covered both short and feature-length animated films. Subsequently, two separate animation award categories have been used, based on the films' running times: in the 1980s, the BAFTA Award for Best Short Animation was introduced, and in the 2007 ceremony, the Best Animated Film title was re-introduced, now as an award only for feature films.

== Winners and nominees ==
indicates the winner

Note: In the following tables, the titles and names in bold with a gold background are the winners and recipients; those not in bold are the nominees. The dates given below refer to the years in which the films under consideration were released or eligible, not to the years in which the award ceremonies took place. (This differs from the BAFTA website's awards history feature, which uses years based on the award ceremonies' dates.)

=== 1950s (inauguration) ===
Year	Film	Director(s)	Producer(s)	Country
**1954** (8th)	**Árie prérie** (Song of the Prairie, 1949)			
**1954** (8th)	Little Brave Heart			
**1954** (8th)	Power to Fly			
**1954** (8th)	The Unicorn in the Garden	William Hurtz		United States
**1955** (9th)	**Blinkity Blank**	**Norman McLaren**		Canada
**1955** (9th)	Animal Farm	John Halas, Joy Batchelor		United Kingdom, United States
**1955** (9th)	Down a Long Way			
**1955** (9th)	Fudget's Budget			United States
**1955** (9th)	Lady and the Tramp	Hamilton Luske, Clyde Geronimi, Wilfred Jackson	Walt Disney	United States
**1955** (9th)	Magoo Express			
**1956** (10th)	**Gerald McBoing! Boing! on Planet Moo**			
**1956** (10th)	Calling All Salesmen			
**1956** (10th)	Christopher Crumpet's Playmate			
**1956** (10th)	The History of the Cinema			
**1956** (10th)	The Invisible Moustache of Raoul Dufy			
**1956** (10th)	Love and the Zeppelin			
**1956** (10th)	Rythmetic			
**1957** (11th)	**Pan-tele-tron**			
**1957** (11th)	Earth is a Battlefield			
**1957** (11th)	The Magic Fluke			
**1957** (11th)	The Shepherdess and the Chimneysweep (La Bergère et le Ramoneur)			
**1958** (12th)	**The Little Island**	Richard Williams	Richard Williams	United Kingdom
**1958** (12th)	The Juggler of Our Lady			
**1958** (12th)	The Blackbird (Le Merle)			
**1959** (13th)	**The Violinist**	**Ernest Pintoff**	Ernest Pintoff	United States
**1959** (13th)	Beep Peep			
**1959** (13th)	Dom	Walerian Borowczyk, Jan Lenica		
**1959** (13th)	Short and Suite	Norman McLaren, Evelyn Lambart (Note: Listed as "Evelyn Lambert" on BAFTA website.)		

=== 1960s ===
Year	Film	Recipient(s)	Country
**1960** (14th)	**Universe**	**Roman Kroitor, Colin Low**	Canada
**1960** (14th)	The Interview	Ernest Pintoff	United States
**1960** (14th)	Piccolo	Dušan Vukotić	Hungary
**1961** (15th)	**One Hundred and One Dalmatians**		United States
**1961** (15th)	Do It Yourself Cartoon Kit		
**1961** (15th)	For Better... For Worse		
**1962** (16th)	**The Apple**		
**1962** (16th)	Four Line Conics		
**1962** (16th)	The Travelling Tune		
**1963** (17th)	**Automania 2000** (Note: BAFTA's website lists both Automania 2000 and The Critic as winners.)	John Halas	United Kingdom
**1963** (17th)	**The Critic**	Ernest Pintoff	United States
**1964** (18th)	**The Insects**	**Jimmy T. Murakami**	
**1965** (19th)	**Do Be Careful Boys**	**Vera Linnecar, Nancy Hanna, Keith Learner**	
**1965** (19th)	The Bargain	Beryl Stevens	
**1965** (19th)	Birds, Bees And Storks	John Halas	United Kingdom
**1965** (19th)	The Hoffnung Symphony Orchestra	Harold Whitaker	United Kingdom
**1966** (20th)	**Not awarded.** (Note: The cited archived version of the BAFTA website specifically states "Category not awarded this year".)		
**1967** (21st)	**Notes On A Triangle**	**René Jodoin**	
**1967** (21st)	Tidy Why	Bill Sewell	
**1967** (21st)	Toys	Grant Munro	Canada
**1968** (22nd)	**Dance For Two (Pas de deux)**	**Norman McLaren**	Canada
**1968** (22nd)	The Hand	Jiří Trnka	Czech Republic
**1968** (22nd)	The House That Jack Built	Ron Tunis	Canada
**1968** (22nd)	The Question	John Halas	United Kingdom
**1969** (23rd)	**Not awarded.**		

=== 1970s ===
Year	Film	Recipient(s)	Country
**1970** (24th)	**Henry 9 'til 5**	**Bob Godfrey**	United Kingdom
**1970** (24th)	Children And Cars	John Halas	United Kingdom
**1970** (24th)	Espolio	Sidney Goldsmith	
**1970** (24th)	It's Tough to Be a Bird	Ward Kimball	United States
**1971** (25th)	**Not awarded.**		
**1972** (26th)	**Not awarded.**		
**1973** (27th)	**Tchou-tchou**		
**1973** (27th)	Balablok		Canada
**1974** (28th)	**Hunger (La Faim)**	Peter Foldes	Canada
**1974** (28th)	Cat's Cradle	Paul Driessen	Canada
**1975** (29th)	**Great**	**Bob Godfrey**	United Kingdom
**1975** (29th)	The Owl Who Married a Goose	Caroline Leaf (advised by Co Hoedeman)	Canada
**1976** (30th)	**Not awarded.** (Note: The cited archived version of the BAFTA website does not specifically state that this category was not awarded in this year.)		
**1977** (31st)	**Not awarded.**		
**1978** (32nd)	**Not awarded.**		
**1979** (33rd)	**Not awarded.**		

=== 1980s ===
Year	Film	Recipient(s)	Country
**1980** (34th)	**The Three Inventors**	**Michel Ocelot**	
**1980** (34th)	Bio Woman	Bob Godfrey	
**1980** (34th)	The Cube	Kamil Pixa	
**1980** (34th)	Seaside Woman	Oscar Grillo	
**1981** (35th)	**The Sweater**	**Sheldon Cohen**	Canada
**1981** (35th)	Beginnings	Clorinda Warny	Canada
**1981** (35th)	Creole	Sam Weiss	

=== 2000s (re-inauguration) ===
Year	Film	Director(s)	Producer(s)	Country
**2006** (60th)
**2006** (60th)	**Happy Feet**	**George Miller, Warren Coleman, Judy Morris**	**Bill Miller, George Miller, Doug Mitchell, Philip Hearnshaw**	**United States**; **Australia**
**2006** (60th)	Cars	John Lasseter, Joe Ranft	Darla K. Anderson	United States
**2006** (60th)	Flushed Away	David Bowers, Sam Fell	Dick Clement, Ian La Frenais, Simon Nye	United Kingdom; United States
**2007** (61st)
**2007** (61st)	**Ratatouille**	**Brad Bird, Jan Pinkava**	**Brad Lewis, John Lasseter, Andrew Stanton, Galyn Susman**	**United States**
**2007** (61st)	Shrek the Third	Chris Miller, Raman Hui	Aron Warner, Andrew Adamson, Denise Nolan Cascino	United States
**2007** (61st)	The Simpsons Movie	David Silverman	James L. Brooks, Matt Groening, Al Jean, Mike Scully, Richard Sakai	United States
**2008** (62nd)
**2008** (62nd)	**WALL-E**	**Andrew Stanton**	**Jim Morris, Lindsey Collins, John Lasseter**	**United States**
**2008** (62nd)	Persepolis	Marjane Satrapi, Vincent Paronnaud	Marc-Antoine Robert	France; Iran
**2008** (62nd)	Waltz with Bashir	Ari Folman	Ari Folman, Serge Lalou, Gerhard Meixner, Yael Nahlieli, Roman Paul	Israel
**2009** (63rd)
**2009** (63rd)	**Up**	**Pete Docter, Bob Peterson**	**Jonas Rivera, John Lasseter, Andrew Stanton**	**United States**
**2009** (63rd)	Coraline	Henry Selick	Claire Jennings	United States
**2009** (63rd)	Fantastic Mr. Fox	Wes Anderson	Wes Anderson, Scott Rudin, Allison Abbate, Steven Rales	United States

=== 2010s ===
Year	Film	Director(s)	Producer(s)	Country
**2010** (64th)
**2010** (64th)	**Toy Story 3**	**Lee Unkrich**	**Darla K. Anderson, John Lasseter, Nicole Paradis Grindle**	**United States**
**2010** (64th)	Despicable Me	Pierre Coffin, Chris Renaud	John Cohen, Janet Healy, Chris Meledandri	United States
**2010** (64th)	How to Train Your Dragon	Chris Sanders, Dean DeBlois	Bonnie Arnold, Doug Davison, Roy Lee, Michael Connolly, Tim Johnson	United States
**2011** (65th)
**2011** (65th)	**Rango**	**Gore Verbinski**	**John B. Carls, Graham King, Gore Verbinski**	**United States**
**2011** (65th)	The Adventures of Tintin	Steven Spielberg	Peter Jackson, Kathleen Kennedy, Steven Spielberg	United States; New Zealand
**2011** (65th)	Arthur Christmas	Sarah Smith	Steve Pegram, Chris Juen	United Kingdom; United States
**2012** (66th)
**2012** (66th)	**Brave**	**Mark Andrews, Brenda Chapman**	**Katherine Sarafian**	**United States**
**2012** (66th)	Frankenweenie	Tim Burton	Tim Burton, Allison Abbate	United States
**2012** (66th)	ParaNorman	Sam Fell, Chris Butler	Travis Knight, Arianne Sutner	United States
**2013** (67th)
**2013** (67th)	**Frozen**	**Chris Buck, Jennifer Lee**	**Peter Del Vecho**	**United States**
**2013** (67th)	Despicable Me 2	Pierre Coffin, Chris Renaud	Janet Healy, Chris Meledandri	United States
**2013** (67th)	Monsters University	Dan Scanlon	Kori Rae	United States
**2014** (68th)
**2014** (68th)	**The Lego Movie**	**Phil Lord and Christopher Miller**	**Dan Lin, Roy Lee**	**United States**; **Denmark**; **Australia**
**2014** (68th)	Big Hero 6	Don Hall, Chris Williams	Roy Conli	United States
**2014** (68th)	The Boxtrolls	Anthony Stacchi, Graham Annable	Travis Knight, David Ichioka	United States
**2015** (69th)
**2015** (69th)	**Inside Out**	**Pete Docter**	**Jonas Rivera**	**United States**
**2015** (69th)	Minions	Pierre Coffin, Kyle Balda	Chris Meledandri, Janet Healy	United States
**2015** (69th)	Shaun the Sheep Movie	Richard Starzak, Mark Burton	Paul Kewley, Julie Lockhart	United Kingdom
**2016** (70th)
**2016** (70th)	**Kubo and the Two Strings**	**Travis Knight**	**Travis Knight, Arianne Sutner**	**United States**
**2016** (70th)	Finding Dory	Andrew Stanton	Lindsey Collins	United States
**2016** (70th)	Moana	Ron Clements, John Musker	Osnat Shurer	United States
**2016** (70th)	Zootopia	Byron Howard, Rich Moore	Clark Spencer	United States
**2017** (71st)
**2017** (71st)	**Coco**	**Lee Unkrich**	**Darla K. Anderson**	**United States**
**2017** (71st)	Loving Vincent	Dorota Kobiela, Hugh Welchman	Hugh Welchman, Ivan Mactaggart, Sean Bobbitt	Poland; United Kingdom
**2017** (71st)	My Life as a Courgette	Claude Barras	Armelle Glorennec, Éric Jacquot, Marc Bonny	Switzerland; France
**2018** (72nd)
**2018** (72nd)	**Spider-Man: Into the Spider-Verse**	**Bob Persichetti, Peter Ramsey, Rodney Rothman**	**Phil Lord**	**United States**
**2018** (72nd)	Incredibles 2	Brad Bird	John Walker	United States
**2018** (72nd)	Isle of Dogs	Wes Anderson	Jeremy Dawson	United States; Germany
**2019** (73rd)
**2019** (73rd)	**Klaus**	**Sergio Pablos**	**Jinko Gotoh**	**Spain**; **United States**
**2019** (73rd)	Frozen 2	Chris Buck, Jennifer Lee	Peter Del Vecho	United States
**2019** (73rd)	A Shaun the Sheep Movie: Farmageddon	Will Becher, Richard Phelan	Paul Kewley	United Kingdom
**2019** (73rd)	Toy Story 4	Josh Cooley	Mark Nielsen	United States

=== 2020s ===
Year	Film	Director(s)	Producer(s)	Country
**2020** (74th)
**2020** (74th)	**Soul**	**Pete Docter, Kemp Powers**	**Dana Murray**	**United States**
**2020** (74th)	Onward	Dan Scanlon	Kori Rae	United States
**2020** (74th)	Wolfwalkers	Tomm Moore, Ross Stewart	Paul Young, Nora Twomey, Tomm Moore, Stéphan Roelants	United Kingdom; Ireland; Luxembourg; France
**2021** (75th)
**2021** (75th)	**Encanto**	**Jared Bush, Byron Howard**	**Yvett Merino, Clark Spencer**	**United States**
**2021** (75th)	Flee	Jonas Poher Rasmussen	Monica Hellström, Signe Byrge Sørensen	Denmark; United States
**2021** (75th)	Luca	Enrico Casarosa	Andrea Warren	United States
**2021** (75th)	The Mitchells vs. the Machines	Mike Rianda	Phil Lord and Christopher Miller, Kurt Albrecht	United States
**2022** (76th)
**2022** (76th)	**Guillermo del Toro's Pinocchio**	**Guillermo del Toro, Mark Gustafson**	**Gary Ungar, Alex Bulkley**	**United States**; **Mexico**
**2022** (76th)	Marcel the Shell with Shoes On	Dean Fleischer Camp	Andrew Goldman, Elisabeth Holm, Caroline Kaplan, Paul Mezey	United States
**2022** (76th)	Puss in Boots: The Last Wish	Joel Crawford	Mark Swift	United States
**2022** (76th)	Turning Red	Domee Shi	Lindsey Collins	United States
**2023** (77th)
**2023** (77th)	**The Boy and the Heron**	**Hayao Miyazaki**	**Toshio Suzuki**	**Japan**
**2023** (77th)	Chicken Run: Dawn of the Nugget	Sam Fell	Steve Pegram, Leyla Hobart	United Kingdom
**2023** (77th)	Elemental	Peter Sohn	Denise Ream	United States
**2023** (77th)	Spider-Man: Across the Spider-Verse	Joaquim Dos Santos, Kemp Powers, Justin K. Thompson	Phil Lord, Christopher Miller, Amy Pascal, Avi Arad, Christina Steinberg	United States
**2024** (78th)	**Wallace & Gromit: Vengeance Most Fowl**	**Nick Park, Merlin Crossingham**	**Richard Beek**	**United Kingdom**
**2024** (78th)	Flow	Gints Zilbalodis	Matīss Kaža	Latvia
**2024** (78th)	Inside Out 2	Kelsey Mann	Mark Nielsen	United States
**2024** (78th)	The Wild Robot	Chris Sanders	Jeff Hermann	United States
**2025** (79th)
**2025** (79th)	**Zootopia 2**	**Jared Bush**; **Byron Howard**	**Yvett Merino**	**United States**
**2025** (79th)	Elio	Madeline Sharafian; Domee Shi; Adrian Molina	Mary Alice Drumm	United States
**2025** (79th)	Little Amélie or the Character of Rain	Maïlys Vallade; Liane-Cho Han	Claire La Combe; Edwina Liard; Henri Magalon; Nidia Santiago	France; Belgium

== Multiple Studio Wins and Nominations ==
Studio	Wins	Nominations	Films
Pixar	8	19	Cars, Ratatouille, WALL-E, Up, Toy Story 3, Brave, Monsters University, Inside Out, Finding Dory, Coco, Incredibles 2, Toy Story 4, Onward, Soul, Luca, Turning Red, Elemental, Inside Out 2, Elio
DreamWorks Animation	0	5	Flushed Away, Shrek the Third, How to Train Your Dragon, Puss in Boots: The Last Wish, The Wild Robot
Disney	3	7	Frozen, Big Hero 6, Zootopia, Moana, Frozen 2, Encanto, Zootopia 2
Aardman	1	6	Flushed Away, Arthur Christmas, Shaun the Sheep Movie, A Shaun the Sheep Movie: Farmageddon, Chicken Run: Dawn of the Nugget, Wallace and Gromit: Vengeance Most Fowl
Nickelodeon Movies	1	2	Rango, The Adventures of Tintin: The Secret of the Unicorn
Laika	1	4	Coraline, ParaNorman,The Boxtrolls, Kubo and the Two Strings
Sony	1	4	Arthur Christmas, Spider-Man: Into the Spider-Verse, The Mitchells vs. the Machines, Spider-Man: Across the Spider-Verse
20th Century Fox	0	3	The Simpsons Movie, Fantastic Mr. Fox, Isle of Dogs
Tim Burton	0	1	Frankenweenie
Illumination	0	3	Despicable Me, Despicable Me 2, Minions
Netflix	2	2	Klaus, Guillermo del Toro's Pinocchio
Other Studios	0	9	Persepolis, Waltz with Bashir, Loving Vincent, My Life as a Courgette, Flee, Marcel the Shell with Shoes On, Flow, Little Amélie or the Character of Rain
Studio Ghibli	1	1	The Boy and the Heron
Cartoon Saloon	0	1	Wolfwalkers
Indian Paintbrush/American Empirical Pictures	0	2	Fantastic Mr. Fox, Isle of Dogs

== See also ==
- Academy Award for Best Animated Feature
- Golden Globe Award for Best Animated Feature Film
- Annie Award for Best Animated Feature
- Annie Award for Best Animated Feature — Independent
- Producers Guild of America Award for Best Animated Motion Picture
- Critics' Choice Movie Award for Best Animated Feature
- Japan Media Arts Festival
- Animation Kobe
- Tokyo Anime Award
- Los Angeles Film Critics Association Award for Best Animated Film
