= Producers Guild of America Award for Best Animated Motion Picture =

Animated film award

- Awarded for: Outstanding Production of Animated Theatrical Motion Pictures
- Country: United States
- Presented by: Producers Guild of America
- First award: 2005
- Currently held by: Michelle Wong for KPop Demon Hunters (2025)

The Producers Guild of America Award for Outstanding Producer of Animated Theatrical Motion Pictures is an award annually given since 2005.

Disney and Pixar's Toy Story is the first franchise with multiple wins, thanks to Toy Story 3 (2010) and Toy Story 4 (2019). Sony's Spider-Verse films won in 2018 and 2023.

== Information ==
Before the Producers Guild of America handed the first outstanding award on animation, animated films competed against live-action films in the Best Theatrical Motion Picture category. Two animated films were nominated in that category:

1. 2001 – Shrek (lost to Moulin Rouge!)
2. 2004 – The Incredibles (lost to The Aviator)

Since the inception of the Best Animated Motion Picture award, animated films can still be nominated for Best Theatrical Motion Picture. Two animated films were nominated since 2005:

1. 2009 – Up (lost to The Hurt Locker)
2. 2010 – Toy Story 3 (lost to The King's Speech)

== Notes ==
- † - indicates a winner of the Academy Award for Best Animated Feature
- ‡ - indicates a nominee for the Academy Award for Best Animated Feature

== Winners and nominees ==
=== 2000s ===
Year	Film	Studio(s)	Producer(s)	Ref.
2005 (17th)	Wallace & Gromit: The Curse of the Were-Rabbit †	Aardman Animations and DreamWorks Animation	Claire Jennings and Nick Park	
2005 (17th)	Chicken Little	Walt Disney Feature Animation	Randy Fullmer	
2005 (17th)	Corpse Bride ‡	Laika Entertainment and Tim Burton Productions	Tim Burton and Allison Abbate	
2005 (17th)	Madagascar	DreamWorks Animation and Pacific Data Images	Mireille Soria	
2005 (17th)	Robots	Blue Sky Studios and 20th Century Fox Animation	Jerry Davis, John C. Donkin, and William Joyce	
2006 (18th)	Cars ‡	Pixar Animation Studios	Darla K. Anderson	
2006 (18th)	Flushed Away	Aardman Animations and DreamWorks Animation	Cecil Kramer and Peter Lord	
2006 (18th)	Happy Feet †	Village Roadshow Pictures, Kennedy Miller Productions, and Animal Logic	Bill Miller, George Miller, and Doug Mitchell	
2006 (18th)	Ice Age: The Meltdown	Blue Sky Studios and 20th Century Fox Animation	Lori Forte	
2006 (18th)	Monster House ‡	Relativity Media, ImageMovers, and Amblin Entertainment	Jack Rapke and Steve Starkey	
2007 (19th)	Ratatouille †	Pixar Animation Studios	Brad Lewis	
2007 (19th)	Bee Movie	DreamWorks Animation	Jerry Seinfeld, Christina Steinberg, and Cameron Stevning	
2007 (19th)	The Simpsons Movie	20th Century Fox Animation, Gracie Films, Film Roman, AKOM Production, and Rough Draft Feature Animation	James L. Brooks, Matt Groening, Al Jean, Mike Scully, and Richard Sakai	
2008 (20th)	WALL-E †	Pixar Animation Studios	Jim Morris	
2008 (20th)	Bolt ‡	Walt Disney Animation Studios	Clark Spencer and John Lasseter	
2008 (20th)	Kung Fu Panda ‡	DreamWorks Animation	Melissa Cobb	
2009 (21st)	Up †	Pixar Animation Studios	Jonas Rivera	
2009 (21st)	9	Bazelevs Animation, Relativity Media, Starz Animation, and Tim Burton Animations	Timur Bekmambetov, Tim Burton, Dana Ginsburg, and Jim Lemley	
2009 (21st)	Coraline ‡	Laika Entertainment and Pandemonium	Henry Selick and Claire Jennings	
2009 (21st)	Fantastic Mr. Fox ‡	20th Century Fox Animation, Indian Paintbrush, Regency Enterprises, American Empirical Pictures, Scott Rudin Productions, and Dune Entertainment	Allison Abbate, Scott Rudin, Wes Anderson, and Jeremy Dawson	
2009 (21st)	The Princess and the Frog ‡	Walt Disney Animation Studios	Peter Del Vecho and John Lasseter	

=== 2010s ===
Year	Film	Studio(s)	Producer(s)	Ref.
2010 (22nd)	Toy Story 3 †	Pixar Animation Studios	Darla K. Anderson	
2010 (22nd)	Despicable Me	Illumination Entertainment	Chris Meledandri, Janet Healy, and John Cohen	
2010 (22nd)	How to Train Your Dragon ‡	DreamWorks Animation	Bonnie Arnold	
2011 (23rd)	The Adventures of Tintin	Nickelodeon Movies, Amblin Entertainment, The Kennedy/Marshall Company, WingNut Films, Hemisphere Media Capital, and Studios Hergé	Steven Spielberg, Peter Jackson, and Kathleen Kennedy	
2011 (23rd)	Cars 2	Pixar Animation Studios	Denise Ream	
2011 (23rd)	Kung Fu Panda 2 ‡	DreamWorks Animation	Melissa Cobb	
2011 (23rd)	Puss in Boots ‡	DreamWorks Animation	Latifa Ouaou and Joe M. Aguilar	
2011 (23rd)	Rango †	Nickelodeon Movies, Blink Wink, GK Films, and Industrial Light & Magic	Gore Verbinski, Graham King, and John B. Carls	
2012 (24th)	Wreck-It Ralph ‡	Walt Disney Animation Studios	Clark Spencer	
2012 (24th)	Brave †	Pixar Animation Studios	Katherine Sarafian	
2012 (24th)	Frankenweenie ‡	Tim Burton Productions	Tim Burton and Allison Abbate	
2012 (24th)	ParaNorman ‡	Laika Entertainment	Travis Knight and Arianne Sutner	
2012 (24th)	Rise of the Guardians	DreamWorks Animation	Christina Steinberg and Nancy Bernstein	
2013 (25th)	Frozen †	Walt Disney Animation Studios	Peter Del Vecho	
2013 (25th)	The Croods ‡	DreamWorks Animation	Kristine Belson and Jane Hartwell	
2013 (25th)	Despicable Me 2 ‡	Illumination Entertainment	Chris Meledandri and Janet Healy	
2013 (25th)	Epic	Blue Sky Studios and 20th Century Fox Animation	Lori Forte and Jerry Davis	
2013 (25th)	Monsters University	Pixar Animation Studios	Kori Rae	
2014 (26th)	The Lego Movie	Village Roadshow Pictures, Lego System A/S, Vertigo Entertainment, Lin Pictures, Animal Logic, RatPac-Dune Entertainment, and Warner Animation Group	Dan Lin and Roy Lee	
2014 (26th)	Big Hero 6 †	Walt Disney Animation Studios	Roy Conli	
2014 (26th)	The Book of Life	Reel FX Creative Studios and 20th Century Fox Animation	Aaron Berger, Brad Booker, Guillermo del Toro, and Carina Schulze	
2014 (26th)	The Boxtrolls ‡	Laika Entertainment	Travis Knight and David Ichioka	
2014 (26th)	How to Train Your Dragon 2 ‡	DreamWorks Animation	Bonnie Arnold	
2015 (27th)	Inside Out †	Pixar Animation Studios	Jonas Rivera	
2015 (27th)	Anomalisa ‡	Starburn Industries and Snoot Films	Rosa Tran, Duke Johnson, Charlie Kaufman, and Dino Stamatopoulos	
2015 (27th)	The Good Dinosaur	Pixar Animation Studios	Denise Ream	
2015 (27th)	Minions	Illumination Entertainment	Chris Meledandri and Janet Healy	
2015 (27th)	The Peanuts Movie	Blue Sky Studios and 20th Century Fox Animation	Craig Schulz, Bryan Schulz, Cornelius Uliano, Paul Feig, and Michael J. Travers	
2016 (28th)	Zootopia †	Walt Disney Animation Studios	Clark Spencer	
2016 (28th)	Finding Dory	Pixar Animation Studios	Lindsey Collins	
2016 (28th)	Kubo and the Two Strings ‡	Laika Entertainment	Travis Knight and Arianne Sutner	
2016 (28th)	Moana ‡	Walt Disney Animation Studios	Osnat Shurer	
2016 (28th)	The Secret Life of Pets	Illumination Entertainment	Chris Meledandri and Janet Healy	
2017 (29th)	Coco †	Pixar Animation Studios	Darla K. Anderson	
2017 (29th)	The Boss Baby ‡	DreamWorks Animation	Ramsey Ann Naito	
2017 (29th)	Despicable Me 3	Illumination Entertainment	Chris Meledandri and Janet Healy	
2017 (29th)	Ferdinand ‡	Blue Sky Studios and 20th Century Fox Animation	Lori Forte and Bruce Anderson	
2017 (29th)	The Lego Batman Movie	Warner Animation Group	Dan Lin, Phil Lord, Christopher Miller, and Roy Lee	
2018 (30th)	Spider-Man: Into the Spider-Verse †	Sony Pictures Animation	Avi Arad, Amy Pascal, Phil Lord, Christopher Miller, and Christina Steinberg	
2018 (30th)	Dr. Seuss' The Grinch	Illumination Entertainment	Chris Meledandri and Janet Healy	
2018 (30th)	Incredibles 2 ‡	Pixar Animation Studios	John Walker and Nicole Paradis Grindle	
2018 (30th)	Isle of Dogs ‡	Babelsberg Studio, Indian Paintbrush, and American Empirical Pictures	Wes Anderson, Scott Rudin, Steven Rales, and Jeremy Dawson	
2018 (30th)	Ralph Breaks the Internet ‡	Walt Disney Animation Studios	Clark Spencer	
2019 (31st)	Toy Story 4 †	Pixar Animation Studios	Mark Nielsen and Jonas Rivera	
2019 (31st)	Abominable	DreamWorks Animation and Pearl Studio	Suzanne Buirgy	
2019 (31st)	Frozen 2	Walt Disney Animation Studios	Peter Del Vecho	
2019 (31st)	How to Train Your Dragon: The Hidden World ‡	DreamWorks Animation	Brad Lewis and Bonnie Arnold	
2019 (31st)	Missing Link ‡	Laika	Arianne Sutner and Travis Knight	

=== 2020s ===
Year	Film	Studio(s)	Producer(s)	Ref.
2020 (32nd)	Soul †	Pixar Animation Studios	Dana Murray	
2020 (32nd)	The Croods: A New Age	DreamWorks Animation	Mark Swift	
2020 (32nd)	Onward ‡	Pixar Animation Studios	Kori Rae	
2020 (32nd)	Over the Moon ‡	Netflix Animation and Pearl Studio	Gennie Rim and Peilin Chou	
2020 (32nd)	Wolfwalkers ‡	Cartoon Saloon and Melusine Productions	Paul Young, Nora Twomey, Tomm Moore, and Stéphan Roelants	
2021 (33rd)	Encanto †	Walt Disney Animation Studios	Yvett Merino and Clark Spencer	
2021 (33rd)	Luca ‡	Pixar Animation Studios	Andrea Warren	
2021 (33rd)	The Mitchells vs. the Machines ‡	Sony Pictures Animation	Phil Lord, Christopher Miller, and Kurt Albrecht	
2021 (33rd)	Raya and the Last Dragon ‡	Walt Disney Animation Studios	Osnat Shurer and Peter Del Vecho	
2021 (33rd)	Sing 2	Illumination	Chris Meledandri and Janet Healy	
2022 (34th)	Guillermo del Toro's Pinocchio †	Netflix Animation	Guillermo del Toro, Gary Ungar, and Alex Bulkley	
2022 (34th)	Marcel the Shell with Shoes On ‡	Chiodo Bros. Production	Elisabeth Holm, Andrew Goldman, Paul Mezey, and Caroline Kaplan	
2022 (34th)	Minions: The Rise of Gru	Illumination	Chris Meledandri, Janet Healy, and Chris Renaud	
2022 (34th)	Puss in Boots: The Last Wish ‡	DreamWorks Animation	Mark Swift	
2022 (34th)	Turning Red ‡	Pixar Animation Studios	Lindsey Collins	
2023 (35th)	Spider-Man: Across the Spider-Verse ‡	Sony Pictures Animation	Phil Lord, Christopher Miller, Amy Pascal, Avi Arad, and Christina Steinberg	
2023 (35th)	The Boy and the Heron †	Studio Ghibli	Toshio Suzuki	
2023 (35th)	Elemental ‡	Pixar Animation Studios	Denise Ream	
2023 (35th)	The Super Mario Bros. Movie	Illumination	Chris Meledandri and Shigeru Miyamoto	
2023 (35th)	Teenage Mutant Ninja Turtles: Mutant Mayhem	Nickelodeon Movies	Seth Rogen, Evan Goldberg, and James Weaver	
2024 (36th)	The Wild Robot ‡	DreamWorks Animation	Jeff Hermann	
2024 (36th)	Flow †	Dream Well Studio, Sacrebleu Productions and Take Five	Matīss Kaža, Gints Zilbalodis, Ron Dyens and Gregory Zalcman	
2024 (36th)	Inside Out 2 ‡	Pixar Animation Studios	Mark Nielsen	
2024 (36th)	Moana 2	Walt Disney Animation Studios	Christina Chen and Yvett Merino	
2024 (36th)	Wallace & Gromit: Vengeance Most Fowl ‡	Aardman Animations	Richard Beek	
2025 (37th)	KPop Demon Hunters †	Sony Pictures Animation	Michelle L.M. Wong	
2025 (37th)	The Bad Guys 2	DreamWorks Animation	Damon Ross	
2025 (37th)	Demon Slayer: Kimetsu no Yaiba Infinity Castle	Toho / Ufotable	Akifumi Fujio, Masanori Miyake and Yūma Takahashi	
2025 (37th)	Elio ‡	Pixar Animation Studios	Mary Alice Drumm	
2025 (37th)	Zootopia 2 ‡	Walt Disney Animation Studios	Yvett Merino	

== Multiple nominations and wins ==
Wins	Nominations	Name (Years)
3	5	Clark Spencer (2008, 2012, 2016, 2018, 2021)
3	3	Darla K. Anderson (2006, 2010, 2017)
3	3	Jonas Rivera (2009, 2015, 2019)
2	4	Christina Steinberg (2007, 2012, 2018, 2023)
2	4	Phil Lord (2017, 2018, 2021, 2023)
2	4	Christopher Miller (2017, 2018, 2021, 2023)
2	2	Amy Pascal (2018, 2023)
2	2	Avi Arad (2018, 2023)
1	4	Peter Del Vecho (2009, 2013, 2019, 2021)
1	3	Yvett Merino (2021, 2024, 2025)
1	2	Claire Jennings (2005, 2009)
1	2	Brad Lewis (2007, 2019)
1	2	Dan Lin (2014, 2017)
1	2	Guillermo del Toro (2014, 2022)
0	9	Chris Meledandri (2010, 2013, 2015, 2016, 2017, 2018, 2021, 2022, 2023)
0	8	Janet Healy (2010, 2013, 2015, 2016, 2017, 2018, 2021, 2022)
0	4	Travis Knight (2012, 2014, 2016, 2019)
0	3	Allison Abbate (2005, 2009, 2012)
0	3	Tim Burton (2005, 2009, 2012)
0	3	Lori Forte (2006, 2013, 2017)
0	3	Arianne Sutner (2012, 2016, 2019)
0	3	Bonnie Arnold (2010, 2014, 2019)
0	2	Melissa Cobb (2008, 2011)
0	2	Jerry Davis (2005, 2013)
0	2	John Lasseter (2008, 2009)
0	2	Denise Ream (2011, 2015)
0	2	Kori Rae (2013, 2020)
0	2	Osnat Shurer (2016, 2021)
0	2	Lindsey Collins (2016, 2022)
0	2	Mark Swift (2020, 2022)
