= 24th Producers Guild of America Awards =

24th Annual Producers Guild Awards
- Date: January 26, 2013
- Location: The Beverly Hilton, Beverly Hills, California
- Country: United States
- Presented by: Producers Guild of America

Highlights
- Best Producer(s) Motion Picture: Argo – Ben Affleck, George Clooney, and Grant Heslov
- Best Producer(s) Animated Feature: Wreck-It Ralph – Clark Spencer
- Best Producer(s) Documentary Motion Picture: Searching for Sugar Man – Malik Bendjelloul and Simon Chinn
- Website: www.producersguild.org

The 24th Producers Guild of America Awards (also known as 2013 Producers Guild Awards), honoring the best film and television producers of 2012, were held at The Beverly Hilton Hotel in Beverly Hills, California on January 26, 2013. The television nominations were announced on November 28, 2012, the documentary nominations on November 30, 2012, and the motion picture nominations on January 2, 2013.

== Winners and nominees ==
=== Film ===
Darryl F. Zanuck Award for Outstanding Producer of Theatrical Motion Pictures
- Argo – Ben Affleck, George Clooney, and Grant Heslov
  - Beasts of the Southern Wild – Michael Gottwald, Dan Janvey, and Josh Penn
  - Django Unchained – Reginald Hudlin, Pilar Savone, and Stacey Sher
  - Les Misérables – Tim Bevan, Eric Fellner, Debra Hayward, and Cameron Mackintosh
  - Life of Pi – Ang Lee, Gil Netter, and David Womark
  - Lincoln – Kathleen Kennedy and Steven Spielberg
  - Moonrise Kingdom – Wes Anderson, Jeremy Dawson, Steven Rales, and Scott Rudin
  - Silver Linings Playbook – Bruce Cohen, Donna Gigliotti, and Jonathan Gordon
  - Skyfall – Barbara Broccoli and Michael G. Wilson
  - Zero Dark Thirty – Kathryn Bigelow, Mark Boal, and Megan Ellison
Outstanding Producer of Animated Theatrical Motion Pictures
- Wreck-It Ralph – Clark Spencer
  - Brave – Katherine Sarafian
  - Frankenweenie – Tim Burton and Allison Abbate
  - ParaNorman – Travis Knight and Arianne Sutner
  - Rise of the Guardians – Christina Steinberg and Nancy Bernstein
Outstanding Producer of Documentary Theatrical Motion Pictures
- Searching for Sugar Man – Malik Bendjelloul and Simon Chinn
  - A People Uncounted – Marc Swenker and Aaron Yegerr
  - The Gatekeepers – Estelle Fialon, Philippa Kowarsky, and Dror Moreh
  - The Island President – Richard Berge and Bonni Cohen
  - The Other Dream Team – Marius Markevicius and Jon Weinbach

=== Television ===
Norman Felton Award for Outstanding Producer of Episodic Television, Drama
- Homeland
  - Breaking Bad
  - Downton Abbey
  - Game of Thrones
  - Mad Men
Danny Thomas Award for Outstanding Producer of Episodic Television, Comedy
- Modern Family
  - 30 Rock
  - The Big Bang Theory
  - Curb Your Enthusiasm
  - Louie
David L. Wolper Award for Outstanding Producer of Long-Form Television
- Game Change
  - American Horror Story
  - The Dust Bowl
  - Hatfields & McCoys
  - Sherlock
Outstanding Producer of Non-Fiction Television
- American Masters
  - Anthony Bourdain: No Reservations
  - Deadliest Catch
  - Inside the Actors Studio
  - Shark Tank
Outstanding Producer of Competition Television
- The Amazing Race
  - Dancing with the Stars
  - Project Runway
  - Top Chef
  - The Voice
Outstanding Producer of Live Entertainment & Talk Television
- The Colbert Report
  - Jimmy Kimmel Live!
  - Late Night with Jimmy Fallon
  - Real Time with Bill Maher
  - Saturday Night Live
Outstanding Sports Program
- Real Sports with Bryant Gumbel
  - 24/7
  - 30 for 30: Catching Hell
  - The Fight Game with Jim Lampley
  - On Freddie Roach
Outstanding Children's Program
- Sesame Street
  - Good Luck Charlie
  - iCarly
  - Phineas and Ferb
  - The Weight of the Nation for Kids: The Great Cafeteria Takeover

=== Digital ===
Outstanding Digital Series
- 30 Rock: The Webisodes
  - Bravo's Top Chef: Last Chance Kitchen
  - Dexter Early Cuts: All in the Family
  - The Guild
  - H+: The Digital Series
  - Red vs. Blue

=== David O. Selznick Achievement Award in Theatrical Motion Pictures ===
- Tim Bevan and Eric Fellner

=== Milestone Award ===
- Bob and Harvey Weinstein

=== Norman Lear Achievement Award in Television ===
- J. J. Abrams

=== Stanley Kramer Award ===
- Bully

=== Visionary Award ===
- Russell Simmons
