= Travis Knight =

American filmmaker (born 1973)

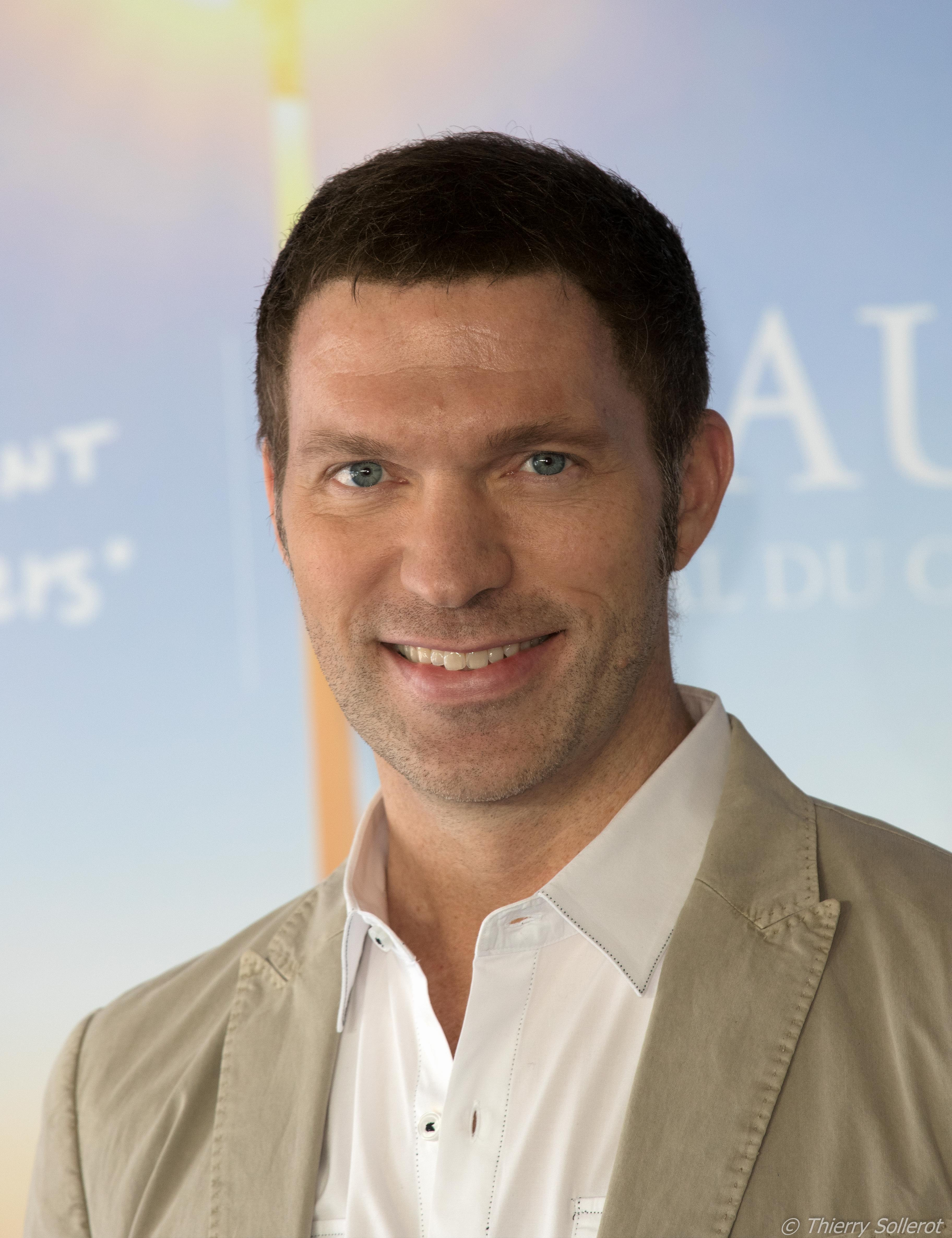
- Knight in 2016
- Born: September 13, 1973 (age 53); Hillsboro, Oregon, U.S.
- Education: Portland State University
- Occupations: Film director; producer; animator; rapper
- Years active: 1990–present
- Children: 2
- Father: Phil Knight
- Relatives: William W. Knight (grandfather)
- Musical career
- Also known as: Chilly Tee
- Genre: Hip hop

Travis Andrew Knight (born September 13, 1973) is an American filmmaker, animator, and former rapper. The son of Nike co-founder Phil Knight, he has worked as the lead animator and is the current CEO of the stop-motion animation studio Laika as well as the director of the company's films Kubo and the Two Strings (2016) and Wildwood (2026). He also directed the live-action films Bumblebee (2018) and Masters of the Universe (2026). For his work at Laika, Knight has earned three Academy Award nominations for Best Animated Feature.

== Early life ==
Knight was born in Hillsboro, Oregon, near Portland. He is the son of Phil Knight (co-founder of Nike), and grandson of publisher William W. Knight. He attended Jesuit High School in Beaverton, Oregon. He is a graduate of Portland State University.

== Career ==
=== Music career ===
Knight began his career as a rapper under the name "Chilly Tee". Using a recording studio built in his father's mansion, Knight self-produced a five-song demo album. The demo caught the attention of Bernie Singleton, president of MCA, who passed the demo to producer Hank Shocklee, who liked the demo and agreed to produce Knight's debut album with his production team, The Bomb Squad.

Knight moved into his parents' Manhattan penthouse for six months while recording the album. The Bomb Squad helped him develop fleshed out choruses, as Shocklee felt that Knight was very skilled at writing verses, but his choruses were weak.

In 1993, Knight released the album Get Off Mine. According to Knight, the record did not sell well and he disliked performing. According to Shocklee, "One of the reasons why it didn't catch on was because it was one record that came out of nowhere, and rap is about building momentum." However, Shocklee is proud of the album, saying, "this record still holds up. You can play it now and it doesn't sound dated."

=== Animation ===
After Travis graduated from Portland State University, Knight's father had become an investor in Will Vinton Studios, and persuaded the company to hire Travis as an intern. He worked on the television series The PJs for Fox Studios and Gary & Mike on UPN, as well as television commercials and promo spots.

By 2003, Phil became a controlling shareholder in Will Vinton Studios, and Travis was promoted to the board of directors, despite having no management experience himself. Following the firing of Vinton, the Knights began to reorganize the studio, which was rebranded as Laika.

Since 2005, Travis has been Laika's vice president of animation. He was a producer and lead animator for Coraline (2009), ParaNorman (2012) and The Boxtrolls (2014). He also sits on the Laika board of directors. Along with Anthony Stacchi and Graham Annable, Knight was nominated for Best Animated Feature at the Academy Awards, for The Boxtrolls.

Travis remains president and CEO of Laika, and is on the board of directors of his father's company, Nike, Inc., since 2015.

=== Directorial career ===
In 2014, Shannon Tindle pitched to Knight a fantasy project based on samurais, which Knight, a fan of fantasy films, approved for development. The film was announced in December 2014, as Kubo and the Two Strings, while Knight was revealed to be producing and directing the film, marking his directorial debut. The film was released in 2016. Along with Arianne Sutner, Knight was again nominated for Best Animated Feature at the Academy Awards, for Kubo and the Two Strings.

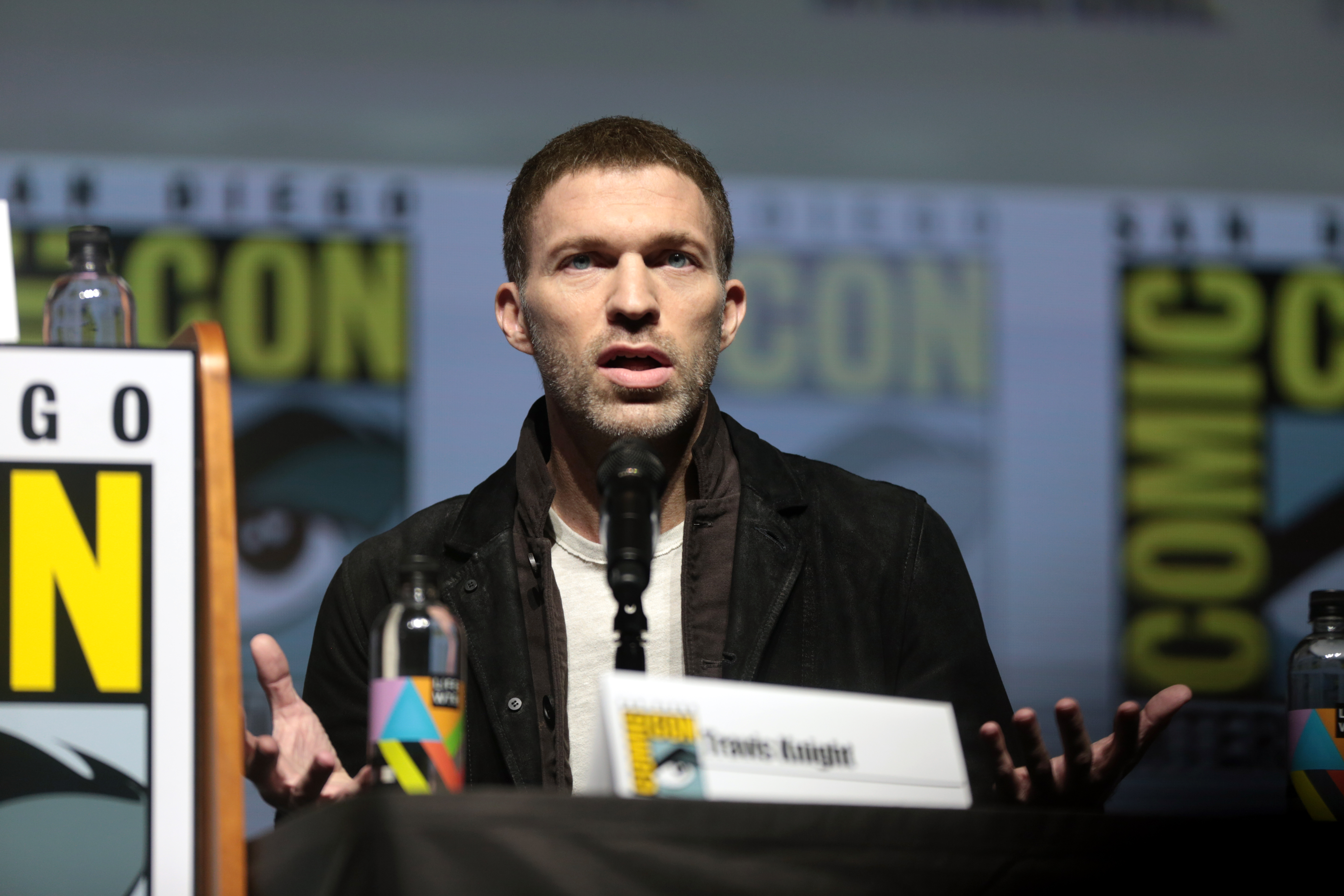
Knight at the 2018 San Diego Comic-Con for Bumblebee

On March 2, 2017, Knight was revealed to be directing the live-action film Bumblebee from the Transformers film series, marking Knight's first time working on a live-action film, and his first time working in a film without acting as a producer. Knight, a fan of the G1 version of the franchise, used many elements from the G1 version in the film. Bumblebee was released on December 21, 2018, to positive reception from both critics and Transformers fans, with many calling it the best film in the franchise.

In April 2019, he was set to direct an adaptation of Six Million Dollar Man starring Mark Wahlberg. In September 2021, Knight was announced to direct a film adaptation of Wildwood, with Chris Butler writing the screenplay. In April 2022, he was announced to direct a new Laika stop-motion neo-noir film titled The Night Gardener.

On May 1, 2024, it was confirmed that Knight would direct a live-action Masters of the Universe movie for Amazon MGM Studios and Mattel Films. The film was released on June 5, 2026.

On June 20, 2024, it was announced that Knight would direct an animated adaptation of the novel Piranesi.

== Personal life ==
Travis Knight, his wife Maryse Knight, and their family live in Oregon.

== Filmography ==
Year	Title	Director	Producer	Notes
2012	ParaNorman	No	Yes	Also animator
2014	The Boxtrolls	No	Yes	Also animator
2016	Kubo and the Two Strings	Yes	Yes	Also animator
2018	Bumblebee	Yes	No	Live-action debut
2019	Missing Link	No	Yes	
2026	Masters of the Universe	Yes	No	
2026	Wildwood	Yes	Yes	

Animator only

Year	Title	Notes
2000	Boyer Brothers	TV movie
2000	The PJs	Episode: "Haiti and the Tramp"
2001	Gary & Mike	
2002	Día de Los Muertos	Short film
2005	Moongirl	Short film
2009	Coraline	

== Awards ==
Year	Award	Category	Film	Result
2010	Annie Awards	Character Animation in a Feature Production	Coraline	Nominated
2010	Visual Effects Society Awards	Outstanding Animated Character in an Animated Feature Motion Picture; Shared with Trey Thomas	Coraline	Nominated
2012	Awards Circuit Community Awards	Best Animated Feature Film; Shared with Arianne Sutner	ParaNorman	Nominated
2013	Annie Awards	Character Animation in a Feature Production	ParaNorman	Won
2013	Online Film & Television Association Awards	Best Animated Picture; Shared with Arianne Sutner	ParaNorman	Nominated
2013	Producers Guild of America Awards	Outstanding Producer of Animated Theatrical Motion Pictures; Shared with Arianne Sutner	ParaNorman	Nominated
2013	Visual Effects Society Awards	Outstanding Animated Character in an Animated Feature Motion Picture; Shared with Chris Butler, Sam Fell & Brad Schiff	ParaNorman	Nominated
2015	Academy Awards	Best Animated Feature; Shared with Anthony Stacchi & Graham Annable	The Boxtrolls	Nominated
2015	Annie Awards	Outstanding Achievement in Character Animation in a Feature Production	The Boxtrolls	Nominated
2015	Producers Guild of America Awards	Outstanding Producer of Animated Theatrical Motion Pictures; Shared with David Bleiman Ichioka	The Boxtrolls	Nominated
2015	Visual Effects Society Awards	Outstanding Animated Character in an Animated Feature Motion Picture; Shared with Jason Stalman, Mike Laubach & Kyle Williams	The Boxtrolls	Nominated
2015	Visual Effects Society Awards	Outstanding Animation in an Animated Feature Motion Picture; Shared with Anthony Stacchi, Graham Annable & Brad Schiff	The Boxtrolls	Nominated
2017	Academy Awards	Best Animated Feature; Shared with Arianne Sutner	Kubo and the Two Strings	Nominated
2017	Annie Awards	Outstanding Achievement, Directing in an Animated Feature Production	Kubo and the Two Strings	Nominated
2017	British Academy Film Awards	Best Animated Film	Kubo and the Two Strings	Won
2017	Chicago Film Critics Association	Most Promising Filmmaker	Kubo and the Two Strings	Nominated
2017	Producers Guild of America Award	Best Animated Motion Picture; Shared with Arianne Sutner	Kubo and the Two Strings	Nominated
2017	Visual Effects Society Awards	Outstanding Visual Effects in an Animated Feature; Shared with Steve Emerson, Brad Schiff and Arianne Sutner	Kubo and the Two Strings	Won
2020	Academy Awards	Best Animated Feature; Shared with Arianne Sutner and Chris Butler	Missing Link	Nominated
2020	Golden Globe Awards	Best Animated Feature Film; Shared with Arianne Sutner and Chris Butler	Missing Link	Won
2026	Sitges Film Festival	Grand People's Choice Award for Best Feature film in the SOFC	Wildwood	Won
