= Missing Link (2019 film) =

Animated film by Chris Butler

- Theatrical release poster
- Directed by: Chris Butler
- Screenplay by: Chris Butler
- Produced by: Arianne Sutner; Travis Knight
- Starring: Hugh Jackman; Zoe Saldaña; David Walliams; Stephen Fry; Timothy Olyphant; Matt Lucas; Amrita Acharia; Ching Valdes-Aran; Emma Thompson; Zach Galifianakis
- Cinematography: Chris Peterson
- Edited by: Stephen Perkins
- Music by: Carter Burwell
- Production company: Laika
- Distributed by: United Artists Releasing (Note: under Annapurna Pictures)
- Release dates: April 5, 2019 (United Kingdom); April 12, 2019 (United States)
- Running time: 94 minutes
- Country: United States
- Language: English
- Budget: $100 million
- Box office: $26.6 million

Missing Link is a 2019 American stop-motion animated adventure comedy film written and directed by Chris Butler. It features the voices of Hugh Jackman, Zoe Saldaña, Emma Thompson, Stephen Fry, David Walliams, Timothy Olyphant, Matt Lucas, Amrita Acharia, and Zach Galifianakis. The plot follows Mr. Link, an orangutan-like Sasquatch who, with the help of British explorers Sir Lionel Frost and Adelina Fortnight, travels to the Himalayas to meet his Yeti cousins.

Development on a new animated Laika film began in April 2018, with Butler to direct and write the project and the voice cast announced. In May 2018, additional voice cast were announced, with the title being revealed. In June 2018, Laika announced a release date in April 2019. Production was reportedly underway by May 2018 with Laika's artists having constructed over 110 sets with 65 unique locations for the film. Carter Burwell composed the film's musical score. With a budget of $100 million, Missing Link is tied with Wildwood as the most expensive stop-motion animated film of all time.

Missing Link was theatrically released in the United States on April 12, 2019, by United Artists Releasing, and was a box-office bomb, grossing $26.6 million against a $100 million budget, losing the studio $101 million, but received generally positive reviews from critics, who praised its animation and its lighter-hearted tone compared to other Laika works. The film won the Golden Globe Award for Best Animated Feature Film, making it the first non-CGI animated film to win in the category. It also received a nomination at the 92nd Academy Awards for Best Animated Feature.

It is the first animated film to be theatrically released by United Artists in thirty years, following 1989's All Dogs Go to Heaven.

== Plot ==
In 1898, Sir Lionel Frost, a struggling investigator of mythical creatures, continuously searches for different creatures to study and announce their presence in the world, which would allow him to be accepted into the "Society of Great Men", which is led by Sir Lionel's rival, Lord Piggot-Dunceby. Lionel receives a letter acknowledging the presence of a Sasquatch, making a deal with Piggot-Dunceby that would allow him to join the society if he proved that the creature was real.

Lionel travels to the Pacific Northwest, eventually stumbling upon the Sasquatch in a forest. After dubbing him "Mr. Link", Lionel is told by the Sasquatch that he was, in fact, the one who sent the letter. Mr. Link requests Lionel's help in finding his relatives, the Yetis, in the Himalayas. Lionel agrees to help him but is unaware of the fact that Piggot-Dunceby has hired a bounty hunter named Willard Stenk to track Lionel and kill him, ensuring that the pro-imperialist conservative views of the society remain unchallenged.

Lionel's old lover Adelina Fortnight has a map to the Himalayas locked at her house in Santa Ana, California, in a safe that belonged to her late husband, one of Lionel's past partners, so the two visit her mansion to acquire it. However, Adelina harbors resentment for Lionel missing her husband's funeral and kicks him out when he offers to pay her for the map. Lionel and Mr. Link come back later at night and break in, but Mr. Link's noise-making awakens Adelina, who fires at the intruders and instead creates a hole in the safe. Mr. Link pushes the safe out of the top-floor window. Mr. Link and Lionel grab the map and escape but are discovered the next day by Adelina, who allows them to search for the Yetis as long as she is there to accompany them. Stenk arrives, and a shootout ensues, but the trio tricks their pursuer into hopping on the train to search for them.

The trio makes their journey via boat, and Adelina pressures Lionel into reaching out to Mr. Link to prove his sincerity. Lionel enjoys a heartwarming talk with Mr. Link on the boat's deck, where Mr. Link gives himself the name "Susan" after a friendly prospector he once encountered. However, they are once again ambushed by Stenk. After various scuffles across different parts of the ship, the trio eventually locks Stenk in the boat's boarding rooms while they make another escape.

The trio eventually makes their way to the Himalayas and is pointed in the direction of the Yeti temple at Shangri-La, and led to their Queen, who reveals their secluded valley to the group. She then reveals their disdain for mankind extends to Susan, who has interacted closely with them. They throw the trio in a pit for them to stay until they die, where Adelina confronts Lionel on his need for the Society's acceptance being similar to Susan's rejection by the yetis. Susan hoists up Adelina enough to knock down a few Yeti guards, allowing them to stack them and escape. They run across the ice bridge, where an armed Piggot-Dunceby, his assistant Mr. Collick and Stenk are waiting at the center of the bridge. Lionel denounces his rival's pride and defends Susan as more human than Piggot-Dunceby ever will be. As a result, the insane Piggot-Dunceby starts firing his rifle at the ice bridge to kill the trio, until Susan stops Piggot-Dunceby from getting any further, still causing it to crack and break. Piggot-Dunceby and Collick fall to their deaths while the trio and Stenk make a run for it. They are too late and are left hanging on the edge of the destroyed ice bridge. Stenk, who has made it all the way across, decides to finish off Lionel, despite Lionel insisting that it is pointless since Piggot is no longer alive to pay him. This leads to the two engaging in a slapping fight while hanging on the bridge. The trio works together to rid themselves of Stenk, who falls to his death after an icicle breaks and falls on him. Lionel appoints Susan as his new partner in investigations.

After arriving home, Adelina tells Lionel that she will be adventuring on her own for a while and departs, but not before the pair share a brief mutual acceptance of their feelings for each other. Susan and Lionel arrive back at the latter's work space and begin their next case to find Atlantis. After they leave, the end credits reveal maps and souvenirs of their subsequent adventures.

== Voice cast ==
- Hugh Jackman as Sir Lionel Frost, a rash but well-meaning monsters investigator.
- Zach Galifianakis as Mr. Susan Link, a shy yet good-natured and polite orangutan-like Sasquatch searching for his relatives.
- Zoe Saldaña as Adelina Fortnight, a fiercely independent and conscientious adventurer and Sir Lionel's former girlfriend.
- Stephen Fry as Lord Piggot-Dunceby, the arrogant and self-absorbed head of the "Society of Great Men", a foil to Sir Lionel, and Link/Susan's rival.
- Timothy Olyphant as Willard Stenk, a bloodthirsty bounty hunter hired by Lord Piggot-Dunceby to stop Link/Susan and Sir Lionel's quest.
- Emma Thompson as the Yeti Elder, the paranoid and secretive leader of the Yetis.
- Amrita Acharia as Ama Lhamu, a mountain guide who Sir Lionel, Link/Susan and Adelina meet and leads them to the Yeti temple at Shangri-La. Mother of infant Little Ang.
- Ching Valdes-Aran as Gamu, Ama's grandmother and a Yak Herder.
- Matt Lucas as Mr. Collick, Lord Piggot-Dunceby's neurotic assistant and right-hand man.
- David Walliams as Mr. Lemuel Lint, Sir Lionel's former assistant who resigns after almost getting eaten by the Loch Ness Monster.
- Humphrey Ker as Doorman, General Pugh
- Adam Godley as Lord Bilge
- Neil Dickson as Mr. Roylott
- Ian Ruskin as Lord Scrivener
- Matthew Wolf as Lord Ramsbottom
- Darren Richardson as Alfie
- Alan Shearman as Lord Entwhistle
- Jack Blessing as McVitie, a conductor. This was Blessing's final film role, his voice role having been recorded before his death in 2017.
- Richard Miro as Ricardo

Old Worlders voiced by Leila Birch, Jean Gilpin, Peter Lavin, Tom Muggeridge, Jimmy Hibbert, David Holt, Christopher Neame, Moira Quirk, Maebel Rayner, Alexander James Rodriguez, Julian Stone, and Nick Toren.

New Worlders voiced by Kirk Baily, David Beron, William Calvert, David Cowgill, Kerry Gutierrez, Bridget Hoffman, Scott Menville, Erin Myles, Juan Pacheco, Paul Pape, André Sogliuzzo, and Scott Whyte.

Himalayan villagers voiced by Phal Tong Lama, Yangchen Dolkar Gakyil, and Tharlam Dolma Wolfe.

== Production ==
On April 25, 2018, it was announced that Laika had begun development on "Film Five," a new animated film written and directed by Chris Butler and starring Hugh Jackman, Zoe Saldaña, and Zach Galifianakis. The film was set to be distributed by Annapurna Pictures in the United States. On May 7, 2018, it was announced that the film had been titled Missing Link and that additional voice actors would include Stephen Fry, Emma Thompson, Timothy Olyphant, Matt Lucas, David Walliams, Ching Valdes-Aran, and Amrita Acharia.

Production was reportedly underway by May 2018 with Laika's artists having constructed over 110 sets with 65 unique locations for the film.

Overall, the budget was approximately $100 million.

=== Music ===
On October 9, 2018, Carter Burwell was confirmed to score music for the film. The soundtrack was released on April 12, 2019, by Lakeshore Records, the same day as the theatrical release.

== Release ==
The film was released in the United States on April 12, 2019, by United Artists Releasing, Annapurna Pictures and Metro-Goldwyn-Mayer's joint distribution company, making it Laika's first film not to be distributed by Focus Features.

The film was originally planned to be distributed by Focus Features and released on May 18, 2018.

International sales rights to the film were held by AGC International, who pre-sold the movie to distribution companies like Lionsgate for the United Kingdom, Metropolitan Filmexport for France, Elevation Pictures for Canada, Roadshow Films for Australia and New Zealand, Entertainment One for Germany and Spain, Leone Film Group for Italy, Applause Entertainment for Taiwan, GAGA for Japan, ISU C&E for South Korea, Selim Ramia for the Middle East, The Searchers for Benelux, Mis. Label for Scandinavia, Vertical Entertainment for Eastern Europe, UFD for Ukraine and Buena Vista International for Latin America, Russia, Malaysia and Singapore.

== Home media ==
20th Century Fox Home Entertainment released the film in the United States on digital on July 9, 2019, and on Blu-ray and DVD on July 23, 2019.

A 4K home media release is in the works.

== Reception ==
=== Box office ===
Missing Link grossed $16.6 million in the United States and Canada, and $9.6 million in other territories, for a worldwide total of $26.2 million. Deadline Hollywood calculated the net loss of the film to be $101.3 million, when factoring together all expenses and revenues.

In the United States and Canada, the film was released alongside Little, Hellboy, and After, and was projected to gross around $10 million from 3,314 theaters in its opening weekend. However, after grossing $1.6 million on its first day (including $230,000 from Thursday night previews), it went on to debut to $5.9 million, finishing ninth at the box office and marking the 12th-worst opening for a film playing in over 3,000 theaters, the worst opening for a film playing in over 3,150 theaters, and the lowest start for a Laika film ever. In its second weekend the film dropped 27% to $4.4 million, finishing ninth.

=== Critical response ===
On Rotten Tomatoes, the film has an approval rating of 88% based on 171 reviews, with an average rating of 7.2/10. The website's critical consensus reads, "Another beautifully animated triumph for Laika, Missing Link is a visual treat with lots of humor, plenty of heart, and even a little food for thought." On Metacritic, the film has a weighted average score of 68 out of 100, based on 30 critics, indicating "generally favorable reviews". Audiences polled by CinemaScore gave the film an average grade of "B+" on an A+ to F scale, while those at PostTrak gave it an overall positive score of 81% and a "definite recommend" of 63%.

Peter Debruge of Variety wrote: "Sooner or later, Laika was bound to branch out, which makes this funnier, more colorful film the link previously missing between the company's Goth-styled past and whatever comes next." John Nugent of Empire Magazine praised the film, calling it "a charming family-friendly story about adventure and friendship—told with bar-raising artistic craft and technical skill. We'd expect nothing less from Laika."

=== Accolades ===
Accolades received by Missing Link (2019 film)
Award	Date of ceremony	Category	Recipient(s)	Result	Ref.
Academy Awards	February 9, 2020	Best Animated Feature	Chris Butler, Arianne Sutner, and Travis Knight	Nominated	
Annie Awards	January 25, 2020	Best Animated Feature	Arianne Sutner and Travis Knight	Nominated	
Annie Awards	January 25, 2020	Animated Effects in an Animated Production	Eric Wachtman, David Horsley, Peter Stuart, Timur Khodzhaev, and Joe Strasser	Nominated	
Annie Awards	January 25, 2020	Character Animation in a Feature Production	Rachelle Lambden	Nominated	
Annie Awards	January 25, 2020	Directing in a Feature Production	Chris Butler	Nominated	
Annie Awards	January 25, 2020	Production Design in an Animated Feature Production	Nelson Lowry, Santiago Montiel, and Trevor Dalmer	Nominated	
Annie Awards	January 25, 2020	Storyboarding in an Animated Feature Production	Julián Nariño	Nominated	
Annie Awards	January 25, 2020	Storyboarding in an Animated Feature Production	Oliver Thomas	Nominated	
Annie Awards	January 25, 2020	Editorial in an Animated Feature Production	Stephen Perkins	Nominated	
Critics' Choice Movie Awards	January 12, 2020	Best Animated Feature	Missing Link	Nominated	
Golden Globe Awards	January 5, 2020	Best Animated Feature Film	Missing Link	Won	
Producers Guild of America Awards	January 18, 2020	Outstanding Producer of Animated Theatrical Motion Pictures	Arianne Sutner and Travis Knight	Nominated	
San Diego Film Critics Society Awards	December 9, 2019	Best Animated Film	Missing Link	Nominated	
Visual Effects Society Awards	January 29, 2020	Outstanding Visual Effects in an Animated Feature	Brad Schiff, Travis Knight, Steve Emerson, and Benoit Dubuc	Won	
Visual Effects Society Awards	January 29, 2020	Outstanding Animated Character in an Animated Feature	Rachelle Lambden, Brenda Baumgarten, Morgan Hay, and Benoit Dubuc for "Susan"	Won	
Visual Effects Society Awards	January 29, 2020	Outstanding Created Environment in an Animated Feature	Oliver Jones, Phil Brotherton, Nick Mariana, and Ralph Procida for "Passage to India Jungle"	Nominated	
Visual Effects Society Awards	January 29, 2020	Outstanding Model in a Photoreal or Animated Project	Todd Alan Harvey, Dan Casey, and Katy Hughes for "The Manchuria"	Nominated	

== See also ==
- Smallfoot (2018)
- Abominable (2019)
