= Jim Morris (film producer) =

American film producer

- Born: James Morris
- Education: Syracuse University
- Occupations: Producer; production executive; visual effects producer
- Organization(s): General Manager & President of Pixar

James Morris is an American film producer, production executive and visual effects producer. He is currently the general manager and president of Pixar. Previously, he held key positions at Industrial Light & Magic (ILM) for 17 years.

== Education and early career ==
Morris graduated from the Tower Hill School in Wilmington, Delaware in 1973. In 1977, Morris earned a Bachelor of Science degree in film, and in 1978 a Master of Science degree in television/radio, from the S. I. Newhouse School of Public Communications at Syracuse University.

Morris began his career with local television studios, followed by working on TV commercials. He started as a cameraman and editor at NBC affiliate WSYR-TV. During this time, he independently produced and directed the award-winning documentary The Stag Hotel. He then worked at PBS affiliate WCNY-TV, where he wrote and produced the educational series Behind the Wheel as well as the Jim Lehrer-hosted documentary Old Folks at Home and Journey to the Mountain. During this same period, Morris wrote, directed and produced the independent documentary Snapshot. In 1980, Morris moved to San Francisco and worked as an editor at KTVU-TV in Oakland, after which he moved on to the production departments at advertising agencies J. Walter Thompson, and Foote, Cone & Belding. Morris was named executive producer heading the commercial production department at the innovative post-production facility One Pass, and then became the executive producer at Arnold & Associates, producing national commercials for clients such as Atari and Chevron. While at Arnold & Associates, Morris received an NEA Grant to write, direct and produce the independent documentary Rehearsal.

== Industrial Light & Magic ==
In 1987, Morris joined ILM as a producer of visual effects for films and commercials, working on, amongst others, Steven Spielberg's Always and James Cameron's The Abyss, which earned an Oscar for Best Visual Effects. He was subsequently promoted to be ILM's executive in charge of production, supervising all the company's production, and then ILM's general manager, supervising more than 1,400 artists and technicians and guiding the largest visual effects facility in the industry, a post he held for 13 years. During this period, ILM's innovations resulting in Academy Awards included the pioneering use of computer-generated characters in Jurassic Park, realistic digital skin in Death Becomes Her, Terminator 2: Judgment Day and Forrest Gump. Other ILM projects he managed from the period include Mission: Impossible, Twister, Saving Private Ryan, Star Wars Episodes I and II, The Perfect Storm, Pearl Harbor, Minority Report, Pirates of the Caribbean: The Curse of the Black Pearl, Master and Commander, and three Harry Potter films. ILM worked on over 160 films during this period.

Morris was president of Lucas Digital Ltd. for 11 years, and managed its two divisions, ILM and Skywalker Sound. Additionally, Morris oversaw Lucasfilm Animation from 2000 to 2005.

== Pixar ==
Morris joined Pixar Animation Studios in 2005. He was producer of Pixar's critically acclaimed 2008 film, WALL-E, and was responsible for managing the production of the studio's features, shorts, DVD content, and theme park activities. In 2008 he was named as general manager for Pixar Animation Studios.

Morris was producer of Disney's 2012 film John Carter.

On November 18, 2014, he was named as president of Pixar Animation Studios, succeeding Edwin Catmull. In August 2019, former Walt Disney Animation Studios head Andrew Millstein was named as co-president of Blue Sky Studios, while Morris would also be taking a supervising role over Millstein.

== Industry roles and awards ==
Morris served for many years as president of the San Francisco Film Commission. He was a 2009 recipient of the Producers Guild of America Digital 25 Award. Morris was the founding chair of the Visual Effect Society, and served in that role for two terms. He received the Visual Effects Society's board of directors Award in 2006, a Lifetime Membership in 2007, and their Founders Award in 2010 and was made a VES Fellow in 2016. For WALL-E, Morris was awarded Producers Guild of America's 2009 Producer of the Year for Animated Motion Pictures, the 2008 BAFTA Award for Best Animated Film, a 2008 American Film Institute Award for one of the 10 best films of the year, the 2008 Golden Globe Award for Best Animated Feature Film and a Visual Effects Society Award. Morris is an active member in the VES, BAFTA, the Producers Guild and AMPAS, where he serves as a member of the Finance Committee. In 2021, Morris received the George Arents Award, Syracuse University's highest alumni honor.

== Filmography ==
- Caddyshack II (1988) (visual effects producer)
- The Burbs (1989) (visual effects producer)
- Skin Deep (1989) (visual effects producer)
- The Abyss (1989) (visual effects producer)
- Always (1989) (visual effects producer)
- The Hunt for Red October (1990) (ILM executive in charge of production)
- Joe Versus the Volcano (1990) (ILM executive in charge of production)
- Back to the Future Part III (1990) (ILM executive in charge of production)
- Total Recall (1990) (ILM executive in charge of production)
- Die Hard 2 (1990) (ILM executive in charge of production)
- Ghost (1990) (ILM executive in charge of production)
- Arachnophobia (1990) (ILM executive in charge of production)
- Dreams (1990) (ILM executive in charge of production)
- Kindergarten Cop (1990) (ILM executive in charge of production)
- The Godfather: Part III (1990) (ILM executive in charge of production)
- Flight of the Intruder (1991) (ILM executive in charge of production)
- The Doors (1991) (ILM executive in charge of production)
- Switch (1991) (ILM executive in charge of production)
- Backdraft (1991) (ILM executive in charge of production)
- Hudson Hawk (1991) (ILM executive in charge of production)
- The Rocketeer (1991) (ILM executive in charge of production)
- Terminator 2: Judgment Day (1991) (ILM executive in charge of production)
- Star Trek VI: The Undiscovered Country (1991) (ILM executive in charge of production)
- Hook (1991) (ILM general manager)
- Memoirs of an Invisible Man (1992) (ILM general manager)
- Death Becomes Her (1992) (ILM general manager)
- The Public Eye (1992) (ILM general manager)
- Toys (1992) (ILM general manager)
- Alive (1993) (ILM general manager)
- Fire in the Sky (1993) (ILM general manager)
- Jurassic Park (1993) (ILM general manager)
- Last Action Hero (1993) (ILM general manager)
- Rising Sun (1993) (ILM general manager)
- The Meteor Man (1993) (ILM general manager)
- The Nutcracker (1993) (ILM general manager)
- Schindler's List (1994) (ILM president)
- The Hudsucker Proxy (1994) (ILM president)
- Maverick (1994) (ILM president)
- The Flintstones (1994) (ILM president)
- Wolf (1994) (ILM president)
- Baby's Day Out (1994) (ILM president)
- Forrest Gump (1994) (ILM president)
- The Mask (1994) (ILM president)
- Radioland Murders (1994) (ILM president)
- Star Trek Generations (1994) (ILM president)
- Disclosure (1994) (ILM president)
- In the Mouth of Madness (1995) (ILM president)
- Casper (1995) (ILM president)
- Congo (1995) (ILM president)
- Village of the Damned (1995) (ILM president)
- The Indian in the Cupboard (1995) (ILM president)
- The American President (1995) (ILM president)
- Jumanji (1995) (ILM president)
- Sabrina (1995) (ILM president)
- Twister (1996) (ILM president)
- Mission: Impossible (1996) (ILM president)
- Dragonheart (1996) (ILM president)
- Eraser (1996) (ILM president)
- Special Effects: Anything Can Happen (1996) (ILM president)
- Sleepers (1996) (ILM president)
- Star Trek: First Contact (1996) (ILM president)
- 101 Dalmatians (1996) (ILM president)
- Daylight (1996) (ILM president)
- Mars Attacks! (1996) (ILM president)
- Star Wars: A New Hope Special Edition (1996) (ILM president)
- Star Wars: The Empire Strikes Back Special Edition (1996) (ILM president)
- Star Wars: Return of the Jedi Special Edition (1996) (ILM president)
- The Lost World: Jurassic Park (1997) (ILM president)
- Speed 2: Cruise Control (1997) (ILM president)
- Men in Black (1997) (ILM president)
- Contact (1997) (ILM president)
- Spawn (1997) (ILM president)
- Starship Troopers (1997) (ILM president)
- Midnight in the Garden of Good and Evil (1997) (ILM president)
- Flubber (1997) (ILM president)
- Deconstructing Harry (1997) (ILM president)
- Titanic (1997) (ILM president)
- Amistad (1997) (ILM president)
- Deep Rising (1998) (ILM president)
- Mercury Rising (1998) (ILM president)
- Deep Impact (1998) (ILM president)
- Small Soldiers (1998) (ILM president)
- Saving Private Ryan (1998) (ILM president)
- Snake Eyes (1998) (ILM president)
- Reach the Rock (1998) (ILM president)
- Meet Joe Black (1998) (ILM president)
- Celebrity (1998) (ILM president)
- Jack Frost (1998) (ILM president)
- Mighty Joe Young (1998) (ILM president)
- October Sky (1999) (ILM president)
- The Mummy (1999) (ILM president)
- Star Wars: Episode I – The Phantom Menace (1999) (ILM president)
- Wild Wild West (1999) (ILM president)
- The Haunting (1999) (ILM president)
- Deep Blue Sea (1999) (ILM president)
- Bringing Out the Dead (1999) (ILM president)
- Sleepy Hollow (1999) (ILM president)
- The Green Mile (1999) (ILM president)
- Galaxy Quest (1999) (ILM president)
- Snow Falling (2000) (ILM president)
- Magnolia (2000) (ILM president)
- Mission to Mars (2000) (ILM president)
- The Adventures of Rocky and Bullwinkle (2000) (ILM president)
- The Perfect Storm (2000) (ILM president)
- Space Cowboys (2000) (ILM president)
- Pay It Forward (2000) (ILM president)
- Sweet and Lowdown (2000) (ILM president)
- The Pledge (2001) (ILM president)
- Sweet November (2001) (ILM president)
- The Mummy Returns (2001) (ILM president)
- Pollock (2001) (ILM president)
- Pearl Harbor (2001) (ILM president)
- A.I. Artificial Intelligence (2001) (ILM president)
- Jurassic Park III (2001) (ILM president)
- Planet of the Apes (2001) (ILM president)
- Harry Potter and the Sorcerer's Stone (2001) (ILM president)
- The Majestic (2001) (ILM president)
- Impostor (2002) (ILM president)
- The Time Machine (2002) (ILM president)
- Big Trouble (2002) (ILM president)
- Star Wars: Episode II – Attack of the Clones (2002) (ILM president)
- Minority Report (2002) (ILM president)
- The Bourne Identity (2002) (ILM president)
- Men in Black II (2002) (ILM president)
- Blood Work (2002) (ILM president)
- K-19: The Widowmaker (2002) (ILM president)
- Signs (2002) (ILM president)
- E.T. - 20th Anniversary (2002) (ILM president)
- Punch-Drunk Love (2002) (ILM president)
- Harry Potter and the Chamber of Secrets (2002) (ILM president)
- Gangs of New York (2002) (ILM president)
- Tears of the Sun (2003) (ILM president)
- The Hunted (2003) (ILM president)
- Dreamcatcher (2003) (ILM president)
- Hulk (2003) (ILM president)
- Terminator 3: Rise of the Machines (2003) (ILM president)
- Pirates of the Caribbean: The Curse of the Black Pearl (2003) (ILM president)
- Once Upon a Time in Mexico (2003) (ILM president)
- Master and Commander: The Far Side of the World (2003) (ILM president)
- Timeline (2003) (ILM president)
- Stuck on You (2003) (ILM president)
- Peter Pan (2003) (ILM president)
- Along Came Polly (2004) (ILM president)
- Twisted (2004) (ILM president)
- Hidalgo (2004) (ILM president)
- Van Helsing (2004) (ILM president)
- The Day After Tomorrow (2004) (ILM president)
- Harry Potter and the Prisoner of Azkaban (2004) (ILM president)
- The Chronicles of Riddick (2004) (ILM president)
- The Village (2004) (ILM president)
- The Bourne Supremacy (2004) (ILM president)
- Artifact from the Future: The Making of THX 1138 (2004) (ILM president)
- Sky Captain and the World of Tomorrow (2004) (ILM president)
- Lemony Snicket's A Series of Unfortunate Events (2004) (ILM president)
- Are We There Yet? (2005) (ILM president)
- Son of the Mask (2005) (ILM president)
- The Pacifier (2005) (ILM president)
- xXx: State of the Union (2005) (ILM president)
- Star Wars: Episode III – Revenge of the Sith (2005) (ILM president)
- War of the Worlds (2005) (ILM president)
- The Island (2005) (ILM president)
- Jarhead (2005) (ILM president)
- Harry Potter and the Goblet of Fire (2005) (ILM president)
- Pirates of the Caribbean: Dead Man's Chest (2006) (ILM president)
- Ratatouille (2007) (Pixar executive vice president, Production)
- WALL-E (2008) (producer)
- Up (2009) (Pixar EVP, general manager)
- Toy Story 3 (2010) (Pixar EVP, general manager)
- Cars 2 (2011) (Pixar EVP, general manager)
- John Carter (2012) (producer)
- Brave (2012) (Pixar EVP, general manager)
- Monsters University (2013) (Pixar EVP, general manager)
- Inside Out (2015) (Pixar president)
- The Good Dinosaur (2015) (Pixar president)
- Finding Dory (2016) (Pixar president)
- Cars 3 (2017) (Pixar president)
- Coco (2017) (Pixar president)
- Incredibles 2 (2018) (Pixar president)
- Toy Story 4 (2019) (Pixar president)
- Onward (2020) (Pixar president)
- Soul (2020) (Pixar president)
- Luca (2021) (Pixar president)
- Turning Red (2022) (Pixar president)
- Lightyear (2022) (Pixar president)
- Elemental (2023) (Pixar president)
- Inside Out 2 (2024) (Pixar president)
- Elio (2025) (Pixar president)
- Hoppers (2026) (Pixar president)
- Toy Story 5 (2026) (Pixar president)
- Incredibles 3 (2028) (executive producer)
