= Kori Rae =

American film producer

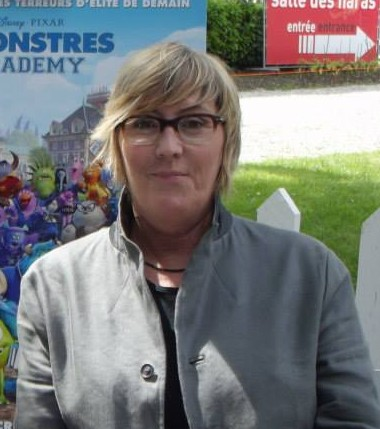
- Rae at the 2013 Annecy International Animated Film Festival
- Occupation: Film producer
- Employer: Pixar
- Spouses: Darla K. Anderson (m. 2004–2004) (m. 2008)

Kori Rae is a film producer for Pixar. She produced several Mater's Tall Tales shorts and the feature films Monsters University and Onward.

== Personal life ==
Rae is married to Darla K. Anderson, also a Pixar producer, who produced Monsters, Inc.. They live together in Noe Valley, San Francisco.

They met in 1991 when Anderson, a San Francisco newcomer, joined a softball team that Rae managed. Anderson and Rae started dating in 2001, during the last year of Monsters, Inc. Since then, they have decided not to work together on the same films. They first married on Presidents' Day 2004 while San Francisco was issuing same-sex marriage licenses, but those licenses were voided by the state Supreme Court.

They married again in 2008, after that court declared same-sex marriage legal but before Proposition 8 took effect.

== Filmography ==
Year	Title	Role	Notes
1998	A Bug's Life	Animation manager	First collaboration with John Lasseter
1999	Toy Story 2	Animation manager	Second collaboration with John Lasseter
2001	Monsters, Inc.	Associate producer	First collaboration with Pete Docter
2004	The Incredibles	Associate producer	
2009	Up	Pre-production producer	Second collaboration with Pete Docter
2008–2010	Mater's Tall Tales	Producer	Short film series
2013	Monsters University	Producer	First collaboration with Dan Scanlon
2018	Purl	Special Thanks	Short film
2020	Onward	Producer	Second collaboration with Dan Scanlon
