= Kubo and the Two Strings =

2016 animated film by Travis Knight

- Theatrical release poster
- Directed by: Travis Knight
- Screenplay by: Marc Haimes; Chris Butler
- Story by: Shannon Tindle; Marc Haimes
- Produced by: Arianne Sutner; Travis Knight
- Starring: Charlize Theron; Art Parkinson; Ralph Fiennes; George Takei; Cary-Hiroyuki Tagawa; Brenda Vaccaro; Rooney Mara; Matthew McConaughey
- Cinematography: Frank Passingham
- Edited by: Christopher Murrie
- Music by: Dario Marianelli
- Production company: Laika
- Distributed by: Focus Features (North America); Universal Pictures (International)
- Release dates: August 13, 2016 (MIFF); August 19, 2016 (United States)
- Running time: 102 minutes
- Country: United States
- Language: English
- Budget: $60 million
- Box office: $77.5 million

Kubo and the Two Strings is a 2016 American epic stop-motion animated fantasy film directed by Travis Knight and written by Marc Haimes and Chris Butler. Produced by Laika, the film stars the voices of Charlize Theron, Art Parkinson, Ralph Fiennes, George Takei, Cary-Hiroyuki Tagawa, Brenda Vaccaro, Rooney Mara, and Matthew McConaughey. Set in feudal Japan, the film revolves around Kubo (Parkinson), a young boy who wields a magical musical instrument and whose left eye was stolen during infancy. Accompanied by an anthropomorphic Japanese macaque charm (Theron) and a human/stag beetle hybrid (McConaughey), he must embark on a quest to defeat his mother's baleful twin sisters (Mara) and his ominous grandfather, the Moon King (Fiennes), who is responsible for stealing his left eye.

Laika's production designer Shannon Tindle pitched the fantasy story based on samurai to Knight. By December 2014, Laika announced that Kubo and the Two Strings would be released in August 2016, with Knight to direct and produce the project, as well as the voice casting announcement. He was enthusiastic about the project, owing partly to his affinity towards both the "epic fantasy" genre as well as Japanese culture in general, despite the studio never having ventured into the genre before. The stop-motion animation was inspired by Japanese media such as ink wash painting, ukiyo-e woodblock printing, and origami among others. Assistance came from 3D printing firm Stratasys who allowed Laika to use their newest technologies in exchange for feedback on them. Knight stated that the story for the film was partly inspired by works of Japanese animator Hayao Miyazaki. Dario Marianelli, who previously composed the music for Laika's 2014 film The Boxtrolls, composed the film's musical score.

Kubo and the Two Strings premiered at Melbourne International Film Festival on August 13, 2016, and was released by Focus Features in the United States on August 19. The film received critical acclaim for its craftsmanship and story. However, it was a box office disappointment, grossing $78 million worldwide against a $60 million budget. The film won the BAFTA Award for Best Animated Film, and was nominated for Academy Awards for Best Animated Feature and Best Visual Effects.

== Plot ==
In the early feudal Japan era, a 12-year-old boy with only one eye named Kubo tends to his ill mother in a mountain cave near a village. He earns their living by manipulating origami with music from his magical shamisen (a Japanese stringed instrument), telling the tale of his missing father Hanzo, a samurai warrior. Kubo is never able to finish his story, as he does not know what happened to Hanzo and his mother cannot recall the end due to her deteriorating mental state. His mother warns him not to stay out after dark as her sisters, as well as his grandfather, the Moon King (who took his left eye when he was a baby), will find him and take his remaining eye.

One day, Kubo learns of the village's Bon Festival that allows them to speak to deceased loved ones. Kubo attends the festival, but is angry when Hanzo does not appear from his lantern, and consequently forgets to return home before sunset. The Sisters, Kubo's twin aunts, quickly find him and attack, but his mother suddenly appears and sends Kubo far away using her magic, telling him to find his father's armor. Kubo wakes up in a distant land to find that Monkey, his wooden snow monkey charm, (Note: Identified in the script as a netsuke) has come alive. Monkey tells him that his mother is gone and the village has been destroyed. With the help of "Little Hanzo", an origami figure based on Kubo's father, they set out to find the armor. Along the way, they meet Beetle, an amnesiac samurai who was cursed to take the form of a stag beetle/human hybrid, but believes he once was a follower of Hanzo.

The three reclaim the "Sword Unbreakable" from a cave guarded by a giant skeleton. They cross the Long Lake in a leaf boat to locate the "Breastplate Impenetrable" deep underwater. Kubo and Beetle swim down to retrieve it and encounter the "Garden of Eyes", a sea monster that uses its many eyes to entrance its victims by showing them visions of secrets, then eats them while they are distracted. Kubo obtains the breastplate, but is caught in the creature's sight and, while entranced, realizes that Monkey is the reincarnated spirit of his mother. Beetle rescues the unconscious Kubo, but once they return to the boat, they find that Monkey has been badly wounded fighting and vanquishing one of her sisters.

Going ashore to recover, Monkey explains that she and her sisters were sent from the heavens and ordered by the Moon King to kill Hanzo, but she arrived early and instead fell in love with him, whereupon she was ousted from the sky. That night, Kubo dreams of meeting his grandfather, who points him towards the "Helmet Invulnerable" in Hanzo's abandoned fortress. They travel there the next day, but realize too late it is a trap. The surviving sister appears and kills Beetle, revealing that he is Hanzo, cursed by the Moon King for taking his daughter away. Monkey sacrifices herself, buying Kubo the time to use his instrument to vanquish the Sister, breaking two of the three strings on it. Little Hanzo provides insight to Kubo that the helmet is actually the bell at the village, and Kubo breaks the last string to quickly travel there.

At the village, Kubo again meets the Moon King, who offers to take Kubo's other eye to make him perfect and immortal, but Kubo refuses. Angered, the Moon King transforms into the Moon Beast, a giant dunkleosteus-like creature, and pursues Kubo and the remaining villagers into the cemetery. When the armor proves ineffective, Kubo removes it and restrings his instrument using his father's bowstring, a strand of his mother's hair, and a strand of his own hair. Playing the instrument, he summons the spirits of the villagers' loved ones, to protect all of them from the Beast and to show the Moon King that memories are the strongest magic of all and can never be destroyed. Kubo and the spirits' magic strip the Moon King of his powers, leaving him a mortal old man without any memories.

Spurred on by Kubo's stories, the villagers choose compassion and tell him he was a man of many positive traits, accepting him into the village. Kubo is able to speak to his parents' ghosts during the subsequent Bon ceremony, as they watch the deceased villagers' lanterns transform into golden cranes and fly to the spirit world.

== Voice cast ==
- Art Parkinson as Kubo, an adventurous 12-year-old boy who can make origami move when he plays his magical instrument
- Charlize Theron as Monkey, a former goddess and Kubo's mother who is reincarnated as a Japanese macaque
- Matthew McConaughey as Hanzo/Beetle, a legendary samurai and Kubo's father who was transformed into a stag beetle/human hybrid
- Rooney Mara as the Sisters, twin goddesses tasked with taking Kubo's other eye by their father, the Moon King
- Ralph Fiennes as the Moon King, God of the Moon and Kubo's grandfather who took Kubo's left eye
- Brenda Vaccaro as Kameyo, Kubo's elderly friend and grandmother-figure in the local village
- George Takei as Hosato, a local villager
- Cary-Hiroyuki Tagawa as Hashi, a local villager who entertains with a Japanese dragon puppet
- Minae Noji as Minae, a local villager
- Alpha Takahashi as Aiko, a local villager
- Laura Miro as Miho, a local villager
- Ken Takemoto as Ken, a local villager

The villagers are voiced by Aaron Aoki, Luke Donaldson, Michael Sun Lee, Cary Y. Mizobe, Rachel Morihiro, Thomas Isao Morinaka, Saemi Nakamura, Zachary Alexander Rice, and Mariel Sheets.

== Production ==
=== Development ===
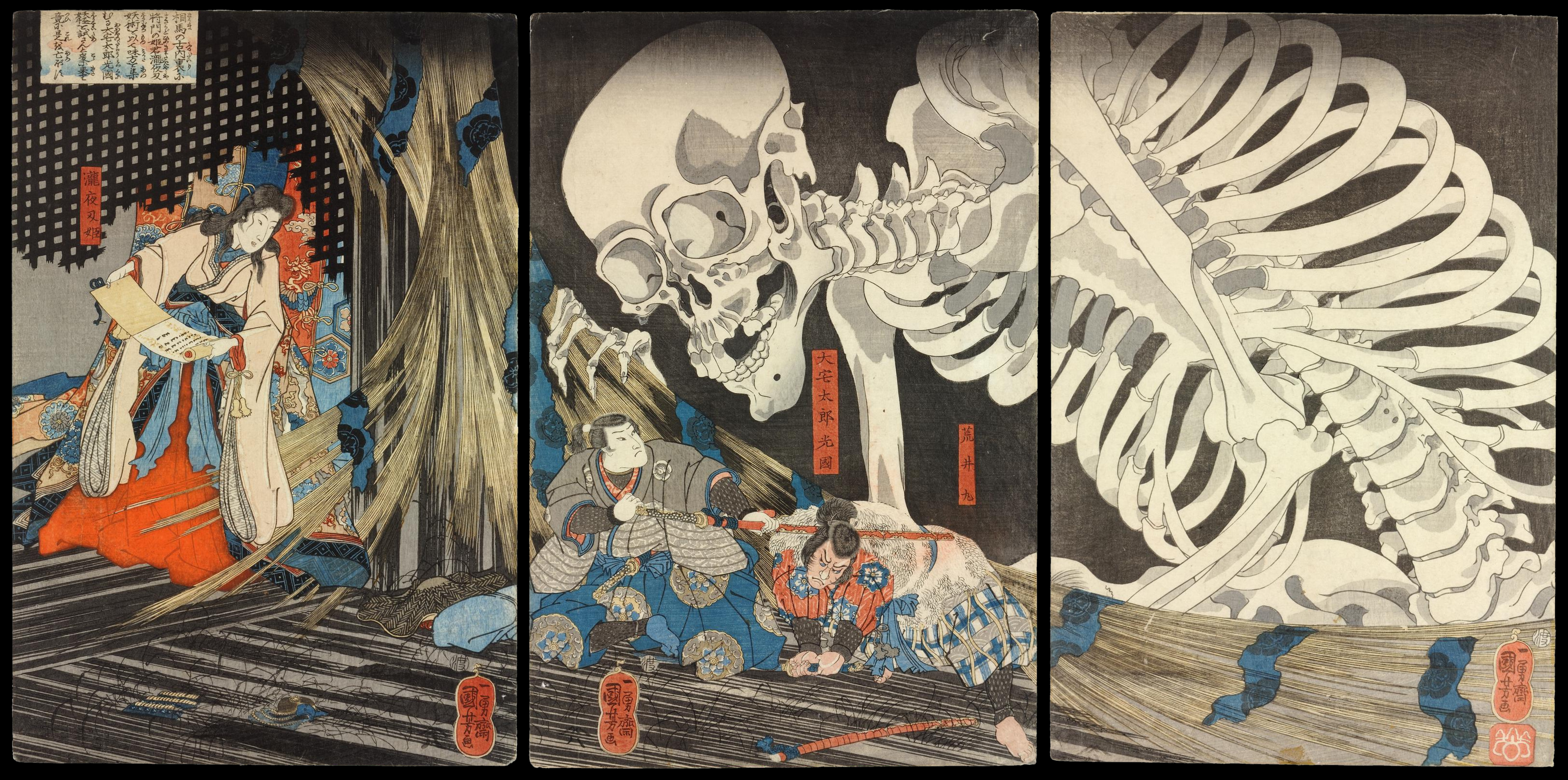
Takiyasha the Witch and the Skeleton Spectre, a 19th-century ukiyo-e woodblock print triptych by Utagawa Kuniyoshi that inspired the giant skeleton.

Kubo and the Two Strings was announced by the stop-motion animation studio Laika in December 2014, and is the directorial debut of Laika's CEO Travis Knight. Laika's production designer Shannon Tindle pitched the story to Knight as a "stop-motion samurai epic". Although the studio had never ventured into the genre before, Knight was enthusiastic about the project; owing partly his affinity towards both the "epic fantasy" genre as well as Japanese culture in general.

The art took inspiration from such Japanese media as ink wash painting and origami among others. A particular influence came from the ukiyo-e woodblock printing style, with Laika intending to make the entire film "to look and feel as if it's a moving woodblock print" A second major influence on the film included the works of Kiyoshi Saito, who was a 20th-century Japanese graphic artist. Assistance came from 3D printing firm Stratasys who allowed Laika to use their newest technologies in exchange for feedback on them. Knight mentioned that the story for the film was partly inspired by works of Japanese animator Hayao Miyazaki and filmmaker Akira Kurosawa.

The art of Kiyoshi Saito was a strong influence on the style of the animation. In an interview, director Travis Knight described Saito's work as being the "touchstone" and the "one key visual artist" that inspired the film. Knight also describes being profoundly affected by the artist's interest in both eastern and western art styles and fusing them together in his works. This artist's combination of different styles across cultures inspired Knight and his film crew in the creation of Kubo and the Two Strings.

For the giant skeleton, the team created a giant 16 ft (5 m), 400 lb (180 kg) puppet, which Laika claims is the record holder for largest stop-motion puppet. The idea to make such a massive puppet was born out of a fear that individual smaller parts (meant to represent the larger monster) would not work well on screen interacting with the other puppets. The resulting puppet was built in two parts which were then attached together by magnets. For movement, Laika had to design a robot to easily manipulate it. The team at one point purchased an industrial robot from eBay, but found that it would not work with their setup. A small portion of the production was released on YouTube.

=== Casting ===
On December 22, 2014, Art Parkinson, Matthew McConaughey, Charlize Theron, Rooney Mara, Ralph Fiennes and Brenda Vaccaro joined the voice cast.

== Music ==
Dario Marianelli composed and conducted the score for the film. The soundtrack album featuring 16 tracks—including a rendition by Regina Spektor of George Harrison's track, "While My Guitar Gently Weeps" from the 1968 double-album The Beatles also known as "The White Album"—was released by Warner Records on August 5, 2016.

== Release ==
Kubo and the Two Strings was first screened at the Melbourne International Film Festival on August 13, 2016, and was theatrically released in the United States on August 19, 2016.

=== Box office ===
Kubo and the Two Strings was released in the United States on August 19, 2016, alongside Ben-Hur and War Dogs. The film was projected to gross $12–15 million from 3,260 theaters in its opening weekend with some projections going as high as $17–20 million. It made $515,000 from its Thursday night previews and $4.1 million on its first day, going on to gross $12.6 million in its opening weekend—just meeting its target—finishing 4th at the box office behind War Dogs, Sausage Party, and Suicide Squad. The film grossed $48 million in North America and $29.5 million in other territories for a worldwide total of $77.5 million, against a budget of $60 million.

=== Critical response ===
On the review aggregator website Rotten Tomatoes, 97% of 230 critics' reviews are positive, with an average rating of 8.4/10. The website's consensus reads: "Kubo and the Two Strings matches its incredible animation with an absorbing—and bravely melancholy—story that has something to offer audiences of all ages." On Metacritic, the film has a weighted average score of 84 out of 100, based on 38 critics, indicating "universal acclaim". Audiences polled by CinemaScore gave the film an average grade of "A" on an A+ to F scale, while PostTrak reported filmgoers gave it an 85% overall positive score and a 63% "definite recommend".

Christy Lemire of RogerEbert.com awarded the film three and a half out of four stars, saying that "one of the most impressive elements of Kubo and the Two Strings—besides its dazzling stop-motion animation, its powerful performances and its transporting score—is the amount of credit it gives its audience, particularly its younger viewers." IGN's Samantha Ladwig gave the film 7.5/10, stating that the film is "dark, twisted, and occasionally scary, but also with humor, love, and inspiration." Jesse Hassenger, of The A.V. Club, praised the film, saying that "no American animation studio is better-suited to dreamlike plotting than Laika, and the animation of Kubo is truly dazzling, mixing sophistication and handmade charm with inspired flow."

Michael O'Sullivan of The Washington Post gave the film four out of four stars, stating that the film is "both extraordinarily original and extraordinarily complex, even for a grown-up movie masquerading as a kiddie cartoon (which it kind of is)." In The New York Times, Glenn Kenny said that "the movie's blend of stop-motion animation for the main action with computer-generated backgrounds is seamless, creating what is the most visually intoxicating of all Laika's movies." Peter Debruge of Variety wrote that "'Kubo' offers another ominous mission for a lucky young misfit, this one a dark, yet thrilling adventure quest that stands as the crowning achievement in Laika's already impressive oeuvre." Jordan Hoffman of The Guardian was more critical of the film, giving it a two out of five stars and saying that "older kids, except for a few teacher’s pets, will soon realise that this is hardly a fun action-adventure cartoon at all, but a plate of vegetables."

Jonathan Pile of Empire, wrote of the film: "Yet another success for stop-motion giants Laika … boasts big laughs and effective scares in a typically gorgeous animated tale."

=== Casting criticism ===
While the film received critical acclaim for its craft and story, it was criticized for its perceived whitewashing as a film set in ancient Japan but featuring a centrally white voice cast of animated characters. George Takei and Cary-Hiroyuki Tagawa were the only actors of Japanese descent, and both played minor characters.

=== Accolades ===
At the 89th Academy Awards, Kubo and the Two Strings was nominated for two awards, Best Animated Feature and Best Visual Effects, but lost to two Disney films respectively: Zootopia and The Jungle Book.

== Home media ==
Format	Release date	Studio
DVD, Blu-ray, Blu-ray 3D, & digital media	22 November 2016	Universal Pictures Home Entertainment
DVD & Blu-ray	14 September 2021	new edition from Shout! Factory under license from Universal
4k Ultra-HD Blu-ray	28 February 2023	Shout! Factory

== Video game ==
A game called Kubo: A Samurai Quest was released for iOS and Android on August 20, 2016, and was removed from the App Store on October 17, 2017.
