= Arianne Sutner =

American film producer and animator

Arianne Sutner is an American film producer and animator, best known for producing the stop-motion animated film Kubo and the Two Strings. She was nominated for an Academy Award for Best Animated Feature at both the 89th Academy Awards and the 92nd Academy Awards.

== Filmography ==
=== As a producer ===
- Missing Link (producer) (2019)
- Kubo and the Two Strings (producer) (2016)
- ParaNorman (producer) (2012)
- The Life Aquatic with Steve Zissou (animation producer - uncredited) (2004)
- The Pigeon and the Onion Pie (Short) (producer) (2004)
- Phantom Investigators (TV Series) (line producer - 4 episodes) (2002)
- KaBlam! (TV Series) (line producer - 17 episodes) (1998-2000)
- Life with Loopy Birthday Gala-Bration (TV Movie) (line producer) (1998)

=== Other Credits ===
- Lodgers (Short) (special thanks) (2016)
- The Big Day Off (Short) (assistant director) (1998)
- James and the Giant Peach (apprentice editor) / (editorial coordinator) (1996)
- Runaway Brain (Short) (assistant production manager: editorial) (1995)
- The Nightmare Before Christmas (story artist - uncredited) (1993)

== Awards and nominations ==
- 2019: Academy Award for Best Animated Feature - Missing Link (nom)
- 2019: Golden Globe Award for Best Animated Feature Film - Missing Link (won)
- 2019: Producers Guild of America Award for Best Animated Motion Picture - Missing Link (nom)
- 2016: Academy Award for Best Animated Feature - Kubo and the Two Strings (nom)
- 2016: BAFTA Award for Best Animated Film - Kubo and the Two Strings (won)
- 2016: Producers Guild of America Award for Best Animated Motion Picture - Kubo and the Two Strings (nom)
- 2016: Visual Effects Society Award for Outstanding Animation in an Animated Feature Motion Picture - Kubo and the Two Strings (won)
- 2012: GLAAD Media Award for Outstanding Film – Wide Release - ParaNorman (nom)
- 2012: Producers Guild of America Award for Best Animated Motion Picture - ParaNorman (nom)
