= Jonas Rivera =

American film producer (born 1971)

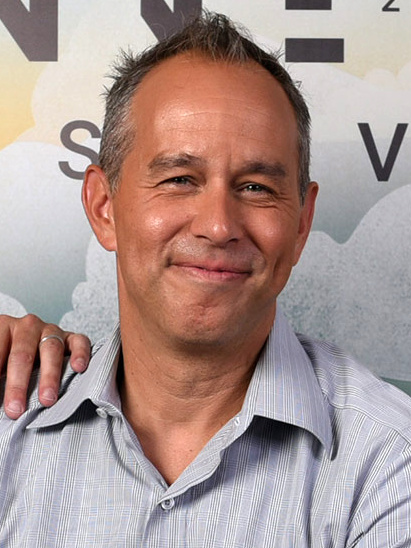
- Rivera at the 2019 Annecy International Animation Festival
- Born: Jonas H. Rivera; May 2, 1971 (age 55); Castro Valley, California, U.S.
- Education: Film Production
- Alma mater: San Francisco State University
- Occupation: Film producer
- Years active: 1994–present
- Employer: Pixar Animation Studios (1994–present)
- Notable work: Up, Inside Out, Toy Story 4
- Spouse: Michele Rivera
- Children: 3
- Awards: Academy Award for Best Animated Feature; Up (2009); Inside Out (2015); Toy Story 4 (2019)

Jonas H. Rivera (born May 2, 1971) is an American film producer of Mexican descent. As of September 2022, he is the executive vice president for film production at Pixar Animation Studios, overseeing operational issues (as distinguished from creative issues) for all film and streaming production. He produced the animated films Up (2009), Inside Out (2015), and Toy Story 4 (2019), all of which won the Academy Award for Best Animated Feature. Rivera is an alumnus of San Francisco State University and has worked at Pixar since starting there as an intern in 1994.

== Early life ==
Rivera was born and raised in Castro Valley, California. His father is of Mexican descent, while his mother is of English Canadian descent. As a boy, he wanted to become an animator, but according to him, he could not draw: "I was a terrible artist, and I still am." Rivera graduated from San Francisco State University with a degree in Film Production.

== Career ==
In 1994, in the last year of making Toy Story, he joined Pixar as their first production intern: "I saw Luxo Jr. in a class and liked it so much I cold-called Pixar." Since then he worked on almost every Pixar film, at first as a coordinator and manager. In 2009, as the producer of Up, he received a nomination for the Academy Award for Best Picture. Rivera also produced Inside Out (2015) and Toy Story 4, both of which won the Academy Award for Best Animated Feature. He was the Development Producer on Soul.

During the making of the first Toy Story, he was collecting things used in the production of the movie, a collection which would eventually be known as the Pixar Archives, now counting thousands of objects and stored in a climate-controlled building. He was inspired by Disney, which also saved objects from the studio productions.

== Personal life ==
Rivera is married to Michele. They have three children: daughters Ava and Elsa and son William.

== Filmography ==
- Toy Story (1995) – Production office assistant
- A Bug's Life (1998) – Art department coordinator
- Toy Story 2 (1999) – Marketing and creative resources coordinator
- Monsters, Inc. (2001) – Art department manager
- Cars (2006) – Production manager, voice of "Boost"
- Up (2009) – Producer - nominated for the Academy Award for Best Picture
- Inside Out (2015) – Producer - winner of the Academy Award for Best Animated Feature
- Toy Story 4 (2019) – Producer - winner of the Academy Award for Best Animated Feature
- Soul (2020) – Development Producer
- Inside Out 2 (2024) – Executive Producer
- Toy Story 5 (2026) – Executive Producer
- Gatto (2027) – Executive Producer
- Ghost Market (2028) – Executive Producer
- Incredibles 3 (2028) – Executive Producer
- Coco 2 (2029) – Executive Producer

=== Short films ===
- George and A.J. (2009) – Executive Producer
- Riley's First Date? (2015) – Executive Producer
