= Chris Butler (filmmaker) =

English animator, writer and director

- Born: 12 February 1974 (age 52); Liverpool, England
- Education: University for the Creative Arts
- Occupations: Animator, writer, director
- Years active: 2000–present

Chris Butler (born 12 February 1974) is an English animator, writer and director, known for his works at Laika, such as ParaNorman and Missing Link, which were both nominated for the Academy Award for Best Animated Feature.

== Education ==
Butler studied animation at the University for the Creative Arts in south England and is an alumnus of Hugh Baird College in Merseyside.

== Filmography ==
Year	Title	Director	Writer	Notes
2012	ParaNorman	Yes	Yes	Co-directed by Sam Fell
2016	Kubo and the Two Strings	No	Yes	Also head of story
2019	Missing Link	Yes	Yes	Also character designer
2025	ParaNorman: The Thrifting	No	Yes	Short film Also executive producer
2026	Masters of the Universe	No	Yes	
2026	Wildwood	No	Yes	Also creative consultant

Character designer

- The Tigger Movie (2000) (Also sequence co-director)
- Missing Link (2019)

Storyboard artist

- Mr. Bean: The Animated Series (2002-2004) (10 episodes)
- Tarzan 2 (2005)
- Corpse Bride (2005)
- The Tale of Despereaux (2008) (Uncredited)
- Coraline (2009) (Storyboard supervisor)
