= ParaNorman =

2012 stop-motion animated film

- Theatrical release poster
- Directed by: Sam Fell; Chris Butler
- Written by: Chris Butler
- Produced by: Arianne Sutner; Travis Knight
- Starring: Kodi Smit-McPhee; Tucker Albrizzi; Anna Kendrick; Casey Affleck; Christopher Mintz-Plasse; Leslie Mann; Jeff Garlin; Elaine Stritch; Bernard Hill; Jodelle Ferland; John Goodman
- Cinematography: Tristan Oliver
- Edited by: Christopher Murrie
- Music by: Jon Brion
- Production company: Laika
- Distributed by: Focus Features (North America); Universal Pictures (International)
- Release dates: August 3, 2012 (Mexico); August 17, 2012 (United States)
- Running time: 92 minutes
- Country: United States
- Language: English
- Budget: $60 million
- Box office: $109.2 million

ParaNorman is a 2012 American independent stop-motion animated comedy horror film produced by Laika. Directed by Sam Fell and Chris Butler (in his directorial debut) and written by Butler, the film stars the voices of Kodi Smit-McPhee, Jodelle Ferland, Bernard Hill, Tucker Albrizzi, Anna Kendrick, Casey Affleck, Christopher Mintz-Plasse, Leslie Mann, Jeff Garlin, Elaine Stritch, and John Goodman. It is the first stop-motion film to use a 3D color printer to create character faces. In the film, Norman Babcock (Smit-McPhee), a young boy who can communicate with ghosts, is given the task of ending a 300-year-old witch's curse on his Massachusetts town.

Announced as part of Laika's upcoming slate of projects, the idea of ParaNorman came from Butler, who thought making such a movie for kids could help express the challenges kids face growing up, after realizing that zombie films often contained a degree of social commentary. Production of the stop-motion animation took place at Laika's studio in Hillsboro, Oregon for three years, with the animating stage of production lasting about two years and beginning in late 2009. Instead of using traditional 3D format cameras, the studio had sixty Canon EOS 5D Mark II DSLR cameras film the movie. Jon Brion composed the film's musical score.

ParaNorman was released on August 17, 2012, by Focus Features. It received positive reviews from critics, who praised its animation and script, and was a modest box office success, earning $109 million against a budget of $60 million. The film was nominated for an Academy Award and a BAFTA for Best Animated Film.

== Plot ==
In the small town of Blithe Hollow, Massachusetts, Norman Babcock is an 11-year-old outcast who speaks with the dead, including the ghost of his paternal grandmother and various ghosts in town. Almost no one believes him and he is isolated emotionally from his family while being looked down upon by his own peers around the school. Neil Downe, an overweight boy who is also bullied, finds in Norman a kindred spirit. After rehearsing a school play commemorating the town's execution of a witch three centuries ago, the boys are confronted by Norman's estranged and seemingly deranged great-uncle, Mr. Prenderghast, who tells Norman that he soon must take up his regular ritual to protect the town. Soon after this encounter, Mr. Prenderghast dies of a heart attack.

During the official performance of the school play, Norman has a nightmarish vision of the town's past in which he is pursued through the woods by townsfolk on a witch hunt, embarrassing himself and leading to a heated argument with his paranoid father Perry, who later grounds him. His mother Sandra tells him that his father's manner is stern because he is afraid for him. The next day, Norman sees Prenderghast's spirit who tells him that the ritual must be performed with a certain book before sundown that day; then making him "swear" to complete the task, Prenderghast's spirit is set free and crosses over. Norman is at first reluctant to go because he is scared but his grandmother tells him it is all right to be scared as long as he does not let it change who he is. Norman sets off to retrieve the book from Prenderghast's house (having to take it from his corpse).

He then goes to the graves of the five men and two women who were cursed by the witch, but finds that the book is merely a series of fairy tales. Alvin, a school bully who always picks on Norman, arrives and prevents Norman from reading the story before sundown. Norman attempts to continue reading from the book, to no effect. A ghostly storm resembling the witch appears in the air, summoning the cursed dead to arise as zombies, who chase the boys along with Neil, Norman's 17-year-old sister Courtney, and Neil's older brother Mitch, down the hill and into town. Having realized that the witch was not buried in the graveyard, Norman contacts classmate Salma (who tells them to access the Town Hall's archives for the location of the witch's unmarked grave) for help. As the kids make their way to the Town Hall, the zombies are attacked by the citizenry. During the riot, Norman and his companions break into the archives but cannot find the information they need. As the mob moves to attack Town Hall, the witch storm appears over the crowd. Norman climbs the Hall's tower to read the book, in a last-ditch effort to finish the ritual, but the witch strikes the book with lightning, hurling Norman from the tower and deep into the archives.

Unconscious, Norman has a dream where he learns that the witch was Agatha "Aggie" Prenderghast, a little girl of his age and a distant relative, who was also a medium. Norman realizes that Aggie was wrongfully convicted by the town council when they mistook her powers for witchcraft. After awakening, Norman encounters the zombies and recognizes them as the town council who convicted Aggie. The zombies and their leader Judge Hopkins admit that they only wanted to speak with him to ensure that he would take up the ritual, to minimize the damage of the mistake they made so long ago. Norman attempts to help the zombies slip away so they can guide him to Aggie's grave, but is cornered by the mob. Courtney, Mitch, Neil, and Alvin rally to Norman's side and confront the crowd, arguing that their rage, fear, and misunderstanding make them no different from the cursed townsfolk from long ago. Although the mob realizes the error of their ways, the witch unleashes her powers to create greater havoc throughout the town.

Judge Hopkins guides Norman's family to the grave in a forest. Before the grave is reached, Aggie's magical powers separate Norman from the others. Norman finds the grave and interacts with Aggie's vengeful ghost, determined to stop the cataclysmic tantrum she has been having over the years. Though she attempts to push him away, Norman holds his ground, telling her that he understands how she feels as an outcast, that her vengeance has only made her like the ones who wronged her, causing her to remember happier days. Having finally encountered someone who understands her plight and by remembering her caring mother, Aggie is able to find a measure of peace and cross over to the afterlife. The storm dissipates, and she, the zombies and even the Judge all fade away. The town cleans up and regards Norman as a hero.

In the end, Norman watches a horror film with his family and the ghost of his grandmother, who have grown to accept Norman for who he is.

== Voice cast ==
- Kodi Smit-McPhee as Norman Babcock, an 11-year-old misfit who can speak to the dead.
- Tucker Albrizzi as Neil Downe, Norman's 12-year-old overweight best friend.
- Anna Kendrick as Courtney Babcock, Norman's 17-year-old sister and a cheerleader.
- Casey Affleck as Mitch Downe, Neil's 19-year-old brother and a jock who is the target of Courtney's affections. He later reveals that he has a boyfriend.
- Christopher Mintz-Plasse as Alvin, a 15-year-old school bully.
- Leslie Mann as Sandra Babcock (née Prenderghast), Courtney and Norman's sympathetic mother.
- Jeff Garlin as Perry Babcock, Courtney and Norman's stern father who is concerned about his son's well-being.
- Elaine Stritch as Grandma Babcock, the ghost of Courtney and Norman's paternal grandmother and Perry's mother.
- Bernard Hill as Judge Hopkins, the judge who accused and punished Aggie for witchcraft, and the leader of the cursed zombies.
- Jodelle Ferland as Agatha "Aggie" Prenderghast, the ghost of an 11-year-old Puritan girl from the 1700s who was accused of witchcraft.
- Tempestt Bledsoe as Sheriff Hooper, the sheriff of Blithe Hollow.
- Alex Borstein as Mrs. Margot Henscher, Norman and Neil's drama teacher.
- John Goodman as Mr. Prenderghast, Sandra's uncle, Courtney and Norman's great uncle and the town's local eccentric.
- Hannah Noyes as Salma, a smart girl from Norman's class.
- Ariel Winter as Blithe Hollow Kid
- Bridget Hoffman as Crystal and Parachutist Ghost
- Scott Menville as Deputy Wayne, a deputy who works for Sheriff Hooper.
- David Cowgill as Greaser Ghost
- Wendy Hoffman as Gucci Lady
- Jeremy Shada as Pug
- Emily Hahn as Sweet Girl
- Jack Blessing as Civil War Ghost

Blithe Hollow townspeople are voiced by Kirk Baily, Cam Clarke, Lara Cody, Eddie Frierson, Rif Hutton, Edie Mirman and David Zyler.

== Production ==
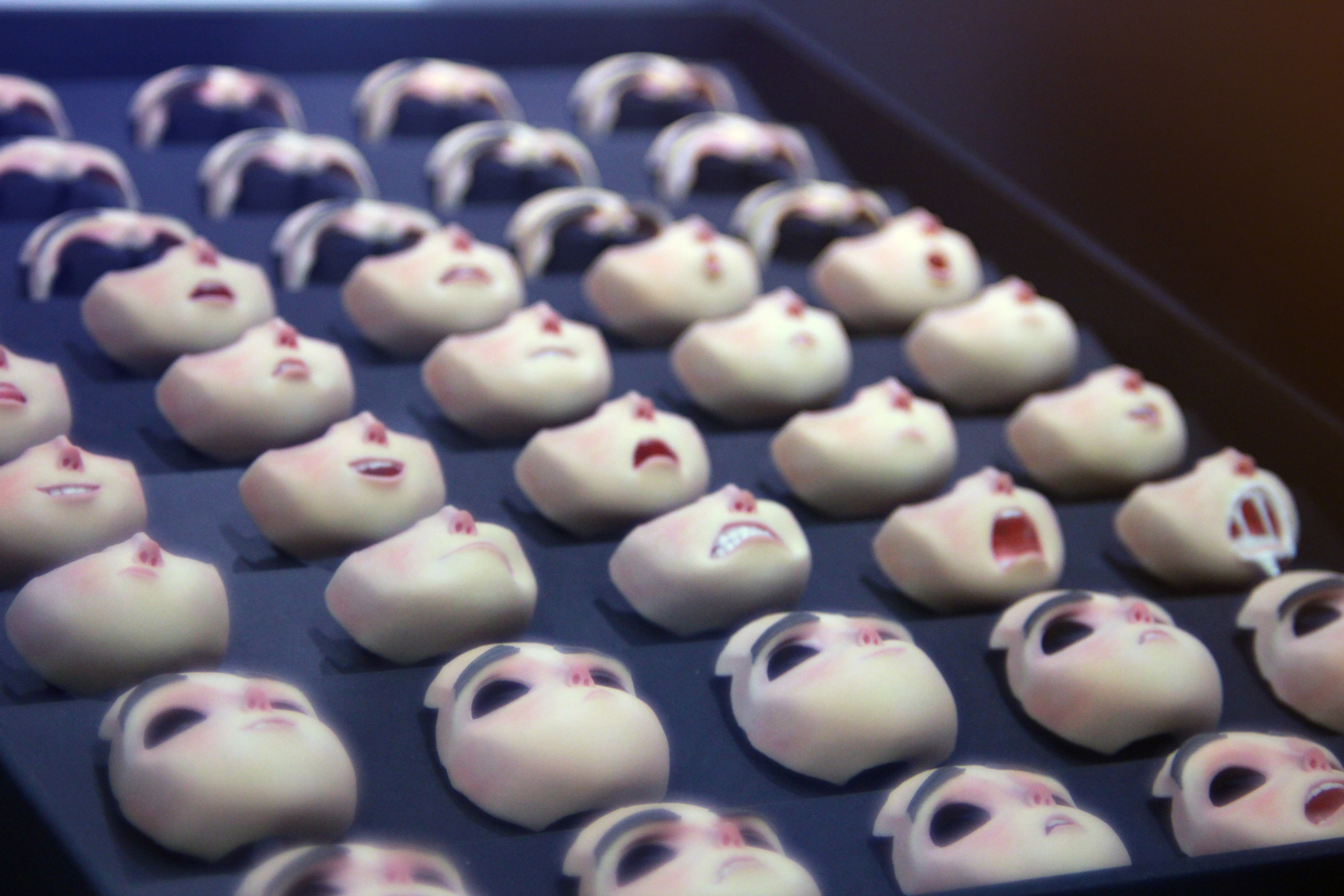
ParaNorman was the first film that used full-color 3D printers for animation.

In 2008, Laika Studios announced a slate of upcoming animated projects including one being ParaNorman, written and directed by Chris Butler who was the supervising storyboarder for the company's first stop-motion film Coraline (2009). The idea of the film came from Butler, who, realizing that zombie films often contained a degree of social commentary, thought making such a movie for kids could help express the challenges kids face growing up.

Production of the stop-motion animation feature took place at Laika's studio in Hillsboro, Oregon. The film was in production for three years, with the animating stage of production lasting about two years and beginning in late 2009. Rather than using traditional 3D-format cameras, the studio had sixty Canon EOS 5D Mark II DSLR cameras film the movie. Advertising agency Wieden+Kennedy created the campaign for the film. ParaNorman is the first-ever stop-motion film to use full-color 3D printers for replacement animation. Laika's previous film Coraline had pioneered and popularized the use of black and white 3D printers, which sped up puppet production considerably and allowed the team to make the large number of puppet faces required for the film. "Quite often it's the stop-motion movies that are more out there," co-director Fell told The New York Times. "They're a little quirkier, they're a little harder to pin down."

The final fight around the film's third act twist villain, Aggie Prenderghast, was a blend of stop motion, CGI effects, and hand-drawn animation. While her body is mostly stop-motion animated, her hair and dress are more grounded in VFX as her hair was exampled from studying one of the concept artists of the film by blowing ink to create a Tesla Coil effect around the hand-drawn feel of her rage. Other VFX used in the film from the storm to the angry mob was all done by Laika's in-house VFX department, making storms out of cotton and putting those visuals in the computer to the crowd shots that took over 100 or 200 background characters to produce with some still in stop motion by hand.

== Soundtrack ==
Jon Brion composed the film's score, and an accompanying soundtrack album was released on August 14, 2012. Bits of other music appear in the film, including the theme music from Halloween, the Donovan song "Season of the Witch" (sung by the school play cast) and "Fix Up, Look Sharp" by British rapper Dizzee Rascal. "Little Ghost", a White Stripes song from their 2005 album Get Behind Me Satan, plays at the end, over character cards identifying the main cast. However, one track in the film, an updated version of "Aggie Fights", was not included in the soundtrack.

== Release ==
=== Home media ===
ParaNorman was released on DVD and Blu-ray by Universal Pictures Home Entertainment on November 27, 2012. A new edition from Shout! Factory under license from Laika was released on Blu-ray on September 14, 2021, and later on 4K Ultra HD Blu-ray on December 13, 2022.

== Other media ==
=== Video game ===
A video game called ParaNorman: 2-Bit Bub was made for iOS.

=== ParaNorman: The Thrifting ===
ParaNorman: The Thrifting
- Directed by: Thibault LeClercq
- Written by: Chris Butler
- Produced by: Peter McCown
- Starring: Brayden Gleave; Beckett Maillard; Anna Kendrick; Finn Wolfhard; Kaden Stoneking; Amanda Sykes
- Music by: Kevin Lax; Robert Lydecker
- Production companies: Laika; Passion Pictures
- Distributed by: Fathom Entertainment
- Release date: October 25, 2025
- Running time: 7 minutes
- Country: United States
- Language: English

ParaNorman: The Thrifting is a computer animated horror comedy short film directed by Laika's principal character designer Thibault LeClercq (who designed Mitch's boyfriend Luca in June 2025 after the film's release), and written by film director Chris Butler who executive produced the short with producer and CEO Travis Knight, based on the characters from the film by Butler and Sam Fell.

The short brings back Anna Kendrick, who voiced Courtney in the film, along with new actors such as Finn Wolfhard as Chad while Brayden Gleave and Beckett Maillard voice Norman and Neil respectively. Produced by Laika in association with Passion Pictures, the short was released in promotion to the re-release of the main film in October 2025.

==== Plot ====
The short opens up with Norman and Courtney walking to Ye Olde Grimporium to find a Halloween costume this year. While Courtney flirts with a moody shop clerk, Chad, Norman starts searching for a costume before bumping into his friend Neil. Finding a strange mask, the lights went out as a supernatural entity chases the boys around the shop. However, it turns out the entity is only a spiritual ghost kid named Edward who wants his mask back from Norman, thinking everything in the store is his. Fighting over the mask, Edward's mother, who's also a spiritual ghost, interrupts this and takes Edward away while grounding him even on a school night. The store is restored from Edward's spiritual influence but Norman decides he doesn't want a costume, leaving the mask on a table. Chad kicks the boys and Courtney out and locks the store for tonight. As they leave, Norman takes one last look at Edward above before leaving while Courtney calls Mitch about Chad.

==== Voice cast ====
- Brayden Gleave as Norman Babcock
- Beckett Maillard as Neil Downe
- Anna Kendrick as Courtney Babcock
- Finn Wolfhard as Chad
- Kaden Stoneking as Edward
- Amanda Sykes as Edward's mother

==== Production ====
In June 2025, Laika announced at the Annecy of a re-release of their film ParaNorman with company Fathom Entertainment along with a CGI-animated short follow-up by as part of their 20th anniversary of the studio. Anna Kendrick reprise her role while Finn Wolfhard was cast as Chad while newcomers, Brayden Gleave and Beckett Maillard, replaces Kodi Smit-McPhee and Tucker Albrizzi as Norman and Neil. On October 9, the trailer was posted from Laika's YouTube channel with a first look at the short being more stylized like the credits of the original film.

Unlike the original film which was produced in stop motion, the animation was made by Passion Pictures in Paris, France while assets and production design comes from Laika Studios. Composers Kevin Lax and Robert Lydecker, who previously worked with producer Peter McCown on DreamWorks Animation's Netflix film Orion and the Dark, were attached to score the short film, replacing Jon Brion.

==== Release ====
The short had its world premiere at the Animation is Film festival on October 18, 2025. It had a theatrical release on October 25, 2025, as part of a re-release anniversary of the original film.

==== Accolades ====
Award	Category	Recipients	Result
53rd Annie Awards	Best Production Design in an Animated Television/Broadcast Production	Thibault Leclercq, Santiago Montiel, Jung Woonyoung, Stephanie Bray-Lee	Nominated
53rd Annie Awards	Best Storyboarding in an Animated Television/Broadcast Production	Coleton Palmer, Katherine Jay Myong, Heewon Jeong	Nominated

== Reception ==
=== Critical response ===
Review aggregator website Rotten Tomatoes gives ParaNorman an approval rating of 89% based on 189 reviews, and an average score of 7.3/10. The website's critical consensus reads, "Beautifully animated and solidly scripted, ParaNorman will entertain (and frighten) older children while providing surprisingly thoughtful fare for their parents." Metacritic gives the film a weighted average score of 72 out of 100 based on 33 reviews, which indicates "generally favorable" reviews. Audiences surveyed by CinemaScore gave the film an average grade of "B+" on an A+ to F scale.

Justin Chang of Variety wrote in his review, "Few movies so taken with death have felt so rudely alive as ParaNorman, the latest handcrafted marvel from the stop-motion artists at Laika." Michael Rechtshaffen of The Hollywood Reporter said, "It has its entertaining moments, but this paranormal stop-motion animated comedy-chiller cries out for more activity."

=== Box office ===
ParaNorman earned $57.1 million in North America, and $52.1 million in other territories, for a worldwide total of $109.2 million. The film premiered in Mexico on August 3, 2012, opening in second place with box office receipts of $2.2 million, behind The Dark Knight Rises. For its opening weekend in North America, the film placed third, with receipts of $14 million, behind The Expendables 2 and The Bourne Legacy. Travis Knight, head of the studio that produced the film, believed the box office total was fine, but did not live up to his expectations.

=== Gay character ===
The film has drawn attention for the revelation in its final scenes that supporting character Mitch is gay, making him the first openly gay character in a mainstream animated film. Nancy French of National Review Online suggested that the film could lead parents "to answer unwanted questions about sex and homosexuality on the way home from the movie theater." Conversely, Mike Ryan of The Huffington Post cited Mitch's inclusion as one of the reasons why ParaNorman is "remarkable". Co-director Chris Butler said that the character was explicitly connected with the film's message: "If we're saying to anyone that watches this movie don't judge other people, then we've got to have the strength of our convictions." In 2013, ParaNorman was the first-ever PG-rated movie nominated by GLAAD in its annual GLAAD Media Awards, but lost to The Perks of Being a Wallflower.

=== Accolades ===
List of awards and nominations
Award	Category	Recipients	Result
Academy Awards	Best Animated Feature	Sam Fell, Chris Butler	Nominated
Alliance of Women Film Journalists	Best Animated Film		Won
Annie Awards	Best Animated Feature	Travis Knight, Arianne Sutner	Nominated
Annie Awards	Outstanding Directing in an Animated Feature Production	Sam Fell, Chris Butler	Nominated
Annie Awards	Outstanding Animated Effects in an Animated Production	Andrew Nawrot, Joe Gorski, Grant Lake	Nominated
Annie Awards	Outstanding Character Animation in a Feature Production	Travis Knight	Won
Annie Awards	Outstanding Character Design in an Animated Feature Production	Heidi Smith	Won
Annie Awards	Outstanding Production Design in an Animated Feature Production	Nelson Lowry, Ross Stewart, Pete Oswald, Ean McNamara, Trevor Dalmer	Nominated
Annie Awards	Outstanding Storyboarding in an Animated Feature Production	Emmanuela Cozzi	Nominated
Annie Awards	Outstanding Writing in an Animated Feature Production	Chris Butler	Nominated
BAFTA Awards	Best Animated Film	Sam Fell, Chris Butler, Travis Knight, Arianne Sutner	Nominated
Chicago Film Critics Association	Best Animated Feature		Won
Critics Choice Awards	Best Animated Feature		Won
Dallas-Fort Worth Film Critics Association	Best Animated Film		Won
Denver Film Critics Society	Best Animated Feature		Won
GLAAD Media Awards	Outstanding Film - Wide Release		Nominated
Houston Film Critics Society	Best Animated Film		Nominated
Indiana Film Critics Association	Best Animated Feature		Nominated
Las Vegas Film Critics Society	Best Animated Film		Won
New York Film Critics Circle Awards	Best Animated Feature		Nominated
Online Film Critics Society	Best Animated Feature		Won
Phoenix Film Critics Society	Best Animated Film		Nominated
Producers Guild of America	Animated Theatrical Motion Pictures	Travis Knight, Arianne Sutner	Nominated
San Diego Film Critics Society	Best Animated Film		Won
San Francisco Film Critics Circle	Best Animated Feature		Won
Satellite Awards	Motion Picture, Animated or Mixed Media		Nominated
Saturn Awards	Best Animated Film	Sam Fell and Chris Butler	Nominated
Southeastern Film Critics Association	Best Animated Film		Won
St. Louis Gateway Film Critics Association	Best Animated Film		Nominated
Toronto Film Critics Association Awards	Best Animated Feature		Won
Utah Film Critics Association	Best Animated Feature		Won
Visual Effects Society	Outstanding Animation in an Animated Feature Motion Picture	Chris Butler, Sam Fell, Travis Knight, Brad Schiff	Nominated
Visual Effects Society	Outstanding Created Environment in an Animated Feature Motion Picture	Graveyard: Phil Brotherton, Robert Desue, Oliver Jones, Nick Mariana	Nominated
Visual Effects Society	Outstanding Created Environment in an Animated Feature Motion Picture	Main Street: Alice Bird, Matt Delue, Caitlin Pashalek	Nominated
Visual Effects Society	Outstanding FX and Simulation Animation in an Animated Feature Motion Picture	Practical Volumetrics: Aidan Fraser, Joe Gorski, Eric Kuehne, Andrew Nawrot	Nominated
Visual Effects Society	Outstanding FX and Simulation Animation in an Animated Feature Motion Picture	Angry Aggie Ink-Blot Electricity: Michael Cordova, Grant Laker, Susanna Luck, Peter Vickery	Nominated
Washington D. C. Area Film Critics Association	Best Animated Feature		Won

== Future ==
=== Proposed television series ===
In 2017, animator Ila Solomon posted test footage for a ParaNorman television spin-off. The series would have used practical sets, but all the characters would have been rendered in CGI made to look like stop motion. Not much information was given, but it was apparent that the show did not get picked up.

== See also ==
- List of ghost films
- List of films about witchcraft
