= Sam Fell =

English film director and animator (born 1965)

- Born: 22 November 1965 (age 60); Isle of Sheppey, Kent, England
- Education: Nottingham Trent University
- Occupations: Animator; director; screenwriter; voice actor
- Years active: 1991–present
- Known for: Flushed Away (2006); The Tale of Despereaux (2008); ParaNorman (2012); Chicken Run: Dawn of the Nugget (2023)

Samuel Jason Fell (born 22 November 1965) is an English animator, director, screenwriter and voice actor.

== Career ==
Fell started his career as director on the short film The Big Cheese for 3 Peach Animation. He then joined Aardman Animations and worked on projects like Pop, Peter Lord's Oscar-nominated short film Wat's Pig, as well as Rex the Runt, before directing the 2002 project Chump. He also developed a children's TV series called Rabbits!.

In 2001, he came up with the story of Flushed Away which he developed through 2002. From 2003, he went on to direct (with David Bowers) the film for Aardman. He also provided the voices for the characters Liam, The Prophet, Ladykiller and Fanseller. From 2008, he went on to direct The Tale of Despereaux for Universal Studios, and also provided the voices of the characters Ned and Smudge.

Fell co-directed Laika's ParaNorman, with Chris Butler, which was released in the United States in August 2012. In May 2013, Fell was set to direct the action comedy film Skiptrace, before he was replaced by Renny Harlin. In 2016, he directed the stop motion short The Greatest Gift for Sainsbury's Christmas advertisement campaign. In 2022, he directed the stop motion comedy film Chicken Run: Dawn of the Nugget (2023). In 2025, he directed the short film Gaza Film Kids for the online initiative "To Gaza, With Love: A Global Anijam". By June 2025, he was developing an untitled stop-motion film for Laika.

== Filmography ==
Short film

| Year | Title | Director | Writer | Animator | Notes |
|---|---|---|---|---|---|
| 1996 | Pop | Yes | Yes | Yes | Also set designer |
| 1996 | Wat's Pig | No | No | Yes | |
| 2001 | Chump | Yes | No | No | |
| 2016 | The Greatest Gift | Yes | No | No | |
| 2025 | Gaza Film Kids | Yes | No | No | |

Television

| Year | Title | Director | Writer | Animator | Notes |
|---|---|---|---|---|---|
| 1992 | The Big Cheese | Yes | Yes | Yes | TV short |
| 2001 | Rex the Runt | Yes | No | Yes | Directed 3 episodes |

Feature film

| Year | Title | Director | Writer | Executive producer | Notes |
|---|---|---|---|---|---|
| 2006 | Flushed Away | Yes | Story | No | Co-directed with David Bowers |
| 2008 | The Tale of Despereaux | Yes | No | No | Co-directed with Rob Stevenhagen |
| 2012 | ParaNorman | Yes | No | No | Co-directed with Chris Butler |
| 2023 | Chicken Run: Dawn of the Nugget | Yes | No | Yes | |

Voice roles

| Year | Title | Role |
|---|---|---|
| 2006 | Flushed Away | Liam / The Prophet / Ladykiller / Fanseller |
| 2008 | The Tale of Despereaux | Ned / Smudge |
