= Darla K. Anderson =

American film producer

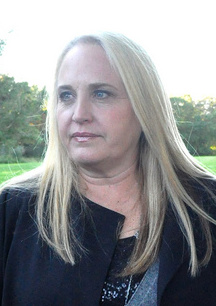
- Anderson in October 2010 attending 18th Annual Hamptons International Film Festival Chairman's Reception at the home of Stuart Suna in East Hampton, New York
- Born: Darla Kay Anderson; October 22, 1968 (age 57); Glendale, California, U.S.
- Occupation: Film producer
- Employers: Pixar Animation Studios (1993–2018); Netflix (2019–present)
- Spouses: Kori Rae (m. 2004–2004) (m. 2008)
- Relatives: Jack Taylor (nephew)
- Awards: Academy Award for Best Animated Feature; Coco (2017)

Darla Kay Anderson (born October 22, 1968) is an American film producer who formerly worked at Pixar Animation Studios. She sits on the national board of directors for the Producers Guild of America.

== Life and career ==
She produced the 2010 film Toy Story 3, which was nominated for the 2011 Academy Award for Best Picture and which won the 2011 Academy Award for Best Animated Feature.

Previously, Anderson won a Golden Satellite Award for A Bug's Life, a BAFTA award for A Bug's Life and Monsters, Inc. and a Producer's Guild Award for Cars.

The 2008 Guinness Book of World Records lists Anderson as having the highest average movie gross for a producer: $221 million per movie, and in 2011 the Wall Street Journal listed a combined gross for the four movies she's produced of over $2 billion.

Anderson was born and raised in Glendale, California. She studied environmental design at San Diego State University. Before coming to Pixar in 1993, she worked as an executive producer at Angel Studios. The character Darla in Finding Nemo was created by the director and screenwriter Andrew Stanton to get back at her for playing practical jokes on him.

On March 8, 2018, it was announced that Anderson left Pixar to pursue other opportunities. In January 2019, it was reported that Anderson had signed a multi-year development deal with Netflix, in which she will develop and produce new animated and live-action projects.

== Personal life ==
Anderson is married to Kori Rae, also a Pixar producer, who produced Monsters University. They live together in Noe Valley, San Francisco.

They met in 1991 when Anderson, a San Francisco newcomer, joined a softball team that Rae managed. Anderson and Rae started dating in 2001, during the last year of Monsters, Inc. Since then, they have decided not to work together on the same films. They first married on Presidents' Day 2004 while San Francisco was issuing same-sex marriage licenses, but those licenses were voided by the state Supreme Court.

They married again in 2008, after that court declared same-sex marriage legal but before Proposition 8 took effect.

Anderson's nephew, Jack Taylor, scored an NCAA record 138 points playing college basketball. She helped him pay to attend basketball camps at upper-tier colleges while he was growing up.

== Filmography ==
Year	Title	Role	Notes
1995	Toy Story	Digital Angel	
1997	Geri's Game	Special Thanks	
1998	It's Tough to Be a Bug!	Executive Producer	
1998	A Bug's Life	Producer	
2001	Monsters, Inc.	Producer	
2002	Mike's New Car	Special Thanks	
2003	Exploring the Reef	Special Thanks	
2006	Cars	Producer	
2006	Mater and the Ghostlight	Executive Producer	
2007	Ratatouille	Pixar Animation Studios	
2008	Cars Toons: Mater's Tall Tales	Special Thanks	
2009	Up	Special Thanks	
2010	Toy Story 3	Producer	
2011	Toy Story Toons: Hawaiian Vacation	Special Thanks	
2011	Cars 2	Special Thanks	
2012	Brave	Special Thanks	
2012	Kalifornija	Producer	Short film
2013	Monsters University	Special Thanks	
2015	Sanjay's Super Team	Special Thanks	
2015	The Good Dinosaur	Special Thanks	
2016	Finding Dory	Special Thanks	
2017	Cars 3	Special Thanks	
2017	Coco	Producer	
2018	Incredibles 2	Special Thanks	
2019	Sitara: Let Girls Dream	Executive producer	Short film
2021	Mission: Joy - Finding Happiness in Troubled Times	Executive producer	

== See also ==
- List of LGBT Academy Award winners and nominees
