= List of accolades received by Encanto =

Encanto accolades
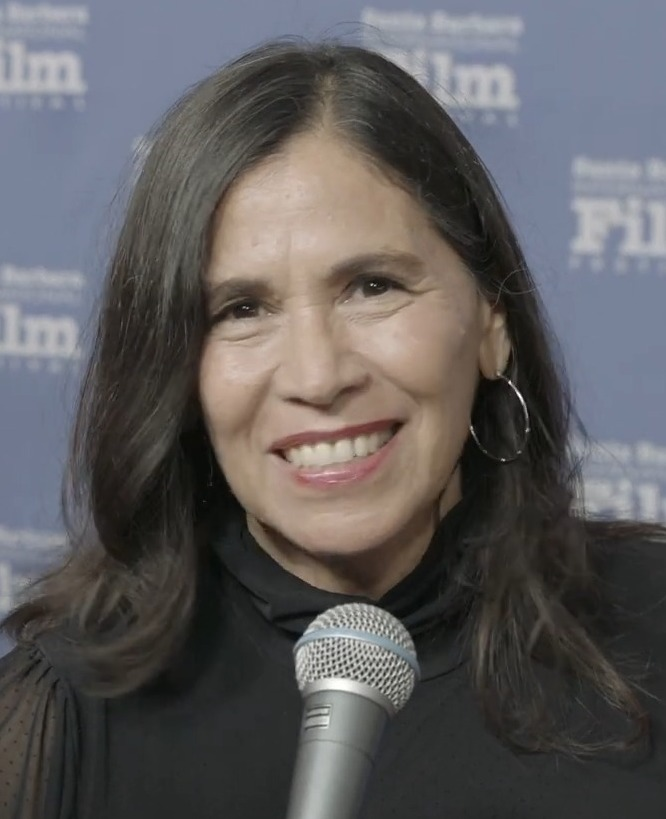
- Composer Germaine Franco received multiple accolades for her work in the film.
Awards and nominations
Award	Wins	Nominations
Academy Awards	1	3
ACE Eddie Awards	1	1
Alliance of Women Film Journalists Awards	2	2
American Music Awards	0	3
Annie Awards	3	9
Art Directors Guild Awards	1	1
Artios Awards	1	1
ASCAP Awards	2	2
Austin Film Critics Association Awards	0	3
Billboard Music Awards	1	1
British Academy Film Awards	1	1
Chicago Film Critics Association	0	1
Cinema Audio Society Awards	1	1
Critics' Choice Movie Awards	0	2
Dallas–Fort Worth Film Critics Association Awards	1	1
Detroit Film Critics Society Awards	0	1
Dorian Awards	0	2
Florida Film Critics Circle Awards	1	1
Georgia Film Critics Association Awards	0	3
Golden Globe Awards	1	3
Golden Reel Awards	0	1
Golden Trailer Awards	0	2
Grammy Awards	3	3
Guild of Music Supervisors Awards	1	2
Hollywood Critics Association Awards	1	3
Hollywood Professional Association Awards	1	3
Houston Film Critics Society Awards	0	2
Hugo Awards	0	1
Imagen Awards	4	6
International Film Music Critics Association Awards	0	1
Lumiere Awards	1	1
MTV Movie & TV Awards	0	2
NAACP Image Awards	1	1
National Board of Review Awards	1	1
Nebula Awards	0	1
Nickelodeon Kids' Choice Awards	1	1
Online Film Critics Society Awards	0	2
Producers Guild of America Awards	1	1
ReFrame Stamp	1	1
San Diego Film Critics Society Awards	0	1
San Francisco Bay Area Film Critics Circle Awards	1	1
Satellite Awards	2	2
Saturn Awards	0	1
Seattle Film Critics Society Awards	0	1
Society of Composers & Lyricists Awards	1	1
St. Louis Film Critics Association Awards	1	1
Toronto Film Critics Association Awards	1	1
Visual Effects Society Awards	4	6
Voice Arts Awards	4	4
Washington D.C. Area Film Critics Association Awards	0	2
Women Film Critics Circle Awards	1	2
World Soundtrack Awards	0	1

Totals (Note: Certain award groups do not simply award one winner. They acknowledge several different recipients, have runners-up, and have third place. Since this is a specific recognition and is different from losing an award, runner-up mentions are considered wins in this award tally. For simplification and to avoid errors, each award in this list has been presumed to have had a prior nomination.)
- Wins: 48
- Nominations: 101

Encanto is a 2021 American animated musical fantasy comedy film produced by Walt Disney Animation Studios and distributed by Walt Disney Studios Motion Pictures. It was directed by Jared Bush and Byron Howard, co-directed by Charise Castro Smith, and produced by Yvett Merino and Clark Spencer. The film features original songs written by Lin-Manuel Miranda and a score composed by Germaine Franco. Stephanie Beatriz, María Cecilia Botero, John Leguizamo, Mauro Castillo, Jessica Darrow, Angie Cepeda, Carolina Gaitán, Diane Guerrero, and Wilmer Valderrama voice the Madrigals, a multigenerational Colombian family. They are led by Alma, the matriarch, whose children and grandchildren—except for Mirabel (Beatriz)—receive magical gifts from a miracle that helps them serve their rural community. When Mirabel learns that the family's magic is fading, she sets out to find out what is happening.

Premiered at the El Capitan Theatre in Hollywood, Los Angeles, on November 3, 2021, the film was released theatrically in the United States on November 24 for a limited 30-day run due to the COVID-19 pandemic. Encanto grossed over $255 million worldwide and became the second highest-grossing animated film of 2021, behind Sing 2. It was met with wider commercial success after its release on Disney+ on December 24, 2021, propelled by viral internet popularity. The film has received acclaim from critics, who praised its music, animation, diversity, and portrayal of family dynamics.

The film and its soundtrack have received various awards and nominations. It garnered three Golden Globe nominations at the 79th ceremony, winning for the Best Animated Feature Film. The National Board of Review named Encanto the Best Animated Film of 2021. It won three of nine nominations at the 49th Annie Awards. At the 94th Academy Awards, the film received three Oscar nominations, including Best Original Score and Best Original Song (for "Dos Oruguitas"), and won for Best Animated Feature. In 2023, Encanto won three awards for its score, soundtrack, and the song "We Don't Talk About Bruno" at the Grammy Awards' 65th ceremony. Various critic circles have also picked Encanto as the best animated feature film of the year.

== Accolades ==
Accolades received by Encanto
Award	Date of ceremony	Category	Recipient(s)	Result	Ref.
Academy Awards	March 27, 2022	Best Animated Feature	Jared Bush, Byron Howard, Yvett Merino, and Clark Spencer	Won	
Academy Awards	March 27, 2022	Best Original Score	Germaine Franco	Nominated	
Academy Awards	March 27, 2022	Best Original Song	Lin-Manuel Miranda (for "Dos Oruguitas")	Nominated	
ACE Eddie Awards	March 5, 2022	Best Edited Animated Feature Film	Jeremy Milton	Won	
Alliance of Women Film Journalists Awards	January 25, 2022	Best Animated Film	Encanto	Won	
Alliance of Women Film Journalists Awards	January 25, 2022	Best Animated Female	Stephanie Beatriz	Won	
American Music Awards	November 20, 2022	Collaboration of the Year	Carolina Gaitán, Mauro Castillo, Adassa, Rhenzy Feliz, Diane Guerrero, Stephanie Beatriz, and the Encanto cast (for "We Don't Talk About Bruno")	Nominated	
American Music Awards	November 20, 2022	Favorite Pop Song	Carolina Gaitán, Mauro Castillo, Adassa, Rhenzy Feliz, Diane Guerrero, Stephanie Beatriz, and the Encanto cast (for "We Don't Talk About Bruno")	Nominated	
American Music Awards	November 20, 2022	Top Soundtrack	Encanto	Nominated	
Annie Awards	March 12, 2022	Best Feature	Encanto	Nominated	
Annie Awards	March 12, 2022	Best FX – Feature	Alex Moaveni, Dimitri Berberov, Bruce Wright, Scott Townsend, and Dale Mayeda	Nominated	
Annie Awards	March 12, 2022	Best Character Animation – Feature	Dave Hardin	Won	
Annie Awards	March 12, 2022	Best Direction – Feature	Jared Bush, Byron Howard, and Charise Castro Smith	Nominated	
Annie Awards	March 12, 2022	Best Music – Feature	Lin-Manuel Miranda and Germaine Franco	Won	
Annie Awards	March 12, 2022	Best Storyboarding – Feature	Jason Hand	Won	
Annie Awards	March 12, 2022	Best Voice Acting – Feature	John Leguizamo	Nominated	
Annie Awards	March 12, 2022	Best Voice Acting – Feature	Stephanie Beatriz	Nominated	
Annie Awards	March 12, 2022	Best Editorial – Feature	Jeremy Milton, John Wheeler, Pace Paulsen, and Brian Estrada	Nominated	
Art Directors Guild Awards	March 5, 2022	Excellence in Production Design for an Animated Film	Ian Gooding and Lorelay Bové	Won	
Artios Awards	March 23, 2022	Outstanding Achievement in Casting – Animation	Jamie Sparer Roberts and Grace C. Kim	Won	
ASCAP Awards	May 2, 2022	Film Score of the Year	Germaine Franco	Won	
ASCAP Awards	May 2, 2022	Top Box Office Films	Germaine Franco and Lin-Manuel Miranda	Won	
Austin Film Critics Association Awards	January 11, 2022	Best Animated Film	Encanto	Nominated	
Austin Film Critics Association Awards	January 11, 2022	Best Voice Acting/Animated/Digital Performance	Stephanie Beatriz	Nominated	
Austin Film Critics Association Awards	January 11, 2022	Best Voice Acting/Animated/Digital Performance	John Leguizamo	Nominated	
Billboard Music Awards	May 15, 2022	Top Soundtrack	Encanto	Won	
British Academy Film Awards	March 13, 2022	Best Animated Film	Jared Bush, Byron Howard, Yvett Merino and Clark Spencer	Won	
Chicago Film Critics Association Awards	December 15, 2021	Best Animated Film	Encanto	Nominated	
Cinema Audio Society Awards	March 19, 2022	Outstanding Achievement in Sound Mixing for a Motion Picture – Animated	Paul McGrath, David E. Fluhr, Gabriel Guy, David Boucher, Alvin Wee, Doc Kane, and Scott Curtis	Won	
Critics' Choice Movie Awards	March 13, 2022	Best Animated Feature	Encanto	Nominated	
Critics' Choice Movie Awards	March 13, 2022	Best Song	"Dos Oruguitas"	Nominated	
Dallas–Fort Worth Film Critics Association Awards	December 20, 2021	Best Animated Film	Encanto	Won	
Detroit Film Critics Society Awards	December 6, 2021	Best Animated Film	Encanto	Nominated	
Dorian Awards	March 17, 2022	Best Animated Film	Encanto	Nominated	
Dorian Awards	March 17, 2022	Best Film Music	Encanto	Nominated	
Florida Film Critics Circle Awards	December 22, 2021	Best Animated Film	Encanto	Won	
Georgia Film Critics Association Awards	January 14, 2022	Best Animated Film	Encanto	Nominated	
Georgia Film Critics Association Awards	January 14, 2022	Best Original Score	Germaine Franco	Nominated	
Georgia Film Critics Association Awards	January 14, 2022	Best Original Song	Lin-Manuel Miranda (for "Dos Oruguitas")	Nominated	
Golden Globe Awards	January 9, 2022	Best Motion Picture – Animated	Encanto	Won	
Golden Globe Awards	January 9, 2022	Best Original Score	Germaine Franco	Nominated	
Golden Globe Awards	January 9, 2022	Best Original Song	Lin-Manuel Miranda (for "Dos Oruguitas")	Nominated	
Golden Reel Awards	March 13, 2022	Outstanding Achievement in Sound Editing – Feature Animation	Shannon Mills, Brad Semenoff, Nia Hansen, Samson Neslund, Justin Doyle, Cameron Barker, Qianbaihui Yang, Richard Quinn, Alyssa Nevarez, John Roesch, Shelley Roden, Earl Ghaffari, Angie Rubin, and Kendall Demarest	Nominated	
Golden Trailer Awards	October 6, 2022	Best Digital: Animation/Family	"Music" (Tiny Hero)	Nominated	
Golden Trailer Awards	October 6, 2022	Best Viral Campaign for a Feature Film	Encanto (Create Advertising Group)	Nominated	
Grammy Awards	February 5, 2023	Best Compilation Soundtrack for Visual Media	Encanto	Won	
Grammy Awards	February 5, 2023	Best Score Soundtrack for Visual Media	Germaine Franco	Won	
Grammy Awards	February 5, 2023	Best Song Written for Visual Media	Lin-Manuel Miranda (for "We Don't Talk About Bruno")	Won	
Guild of Music Supervisors Awards	March 20, 2022	Best Music Supervision for Films Budgeted Over $25 Million	Tom MacDougall	Nominated	
Guild of Music Supervisors Awards	March 20, 2022	Best Song Written and/or Recorded for a Film	Lin-Manuel Miranda, Sebastián Yatra, and Tom MacDougall (for "Dos Oruguitas")	Won	
Hollywood Critics Association Awards	February 28, 2022	Best Animated Film	Encanto	Nominated	
Hollywood Critics Association Awards	February 28, 2022	Best Animated or VSX Performance	Stephanie Beatriz	Won	
Hollywood Critics Association Awards	February 28, 2022	Best Animated or VSX Performance	John Leguizamo	Nominated	
Hollywood Professional Association Awards	November 17, 2022	Outstanding Editing – Feature Film	Jeremy Milton	Nominated	
Hollywood Professional Association Awards	November 17, 2022	Outstanding Sound – Feature Film	Shannon Mills, Nia Hansen, David E. Fluhr, Gabriel Hutchins, and Christopher Hendryx	Nominated	
Hollywood Professional Association Awards	November 17, 2022	Outstanding Visual Effects – Feature Film	Scott Kersavage, Erin V. Ramos, David E. Fluhr, and Paul McGrath	Won (Note: Tied with Julian Foddy, Jan Maroske, Koen Hofmeester, Sally Wilson, and John Seru (Industrial Light & Magic) for Doctor Strange in the Multiverse of Madness (2022))	
Houston Film Critics Society Awards	January 19, 2022	Best Animated Feature	Encanto	Nominated	
Houston Film Critics Society Awards	January 19, 2022	Best Original Song	Lin-Manuel Miranda (for "Dos Oruguitas")	Nominated	
Hugo Awards	September 4, 2022	Best Dramatic Presentation, Long Form	Charise Castro Smith, Jared Bush, and Byron Howard	Nominated	
Imagen Awards	October 2, 2022	Best Feature Film	Encanto	Won	
Imagen Awards	October 2, 2022	Best Director – Feature Film	Jared Bush, Byron Howard, and Charise Castro Smith	Won	
Imagen Awards	October 2, 2022	Best Actor – Feature Film	John Leguizamo	Nominated	
Imagen Awards	October 2, 2022	Best Actress – Feature Film	Stephanie Beatriz	Nominated	
Imagen Awards	October 2, 2022	Best Music Composition for Film or Television	Lin-Manuel Miranda and Germaine Franco	Won	
Imagen Awards	October 2, 2022	Best Music Supervision for Film or Television	Tom MacDougall	Won	
International Film Music Critics Association Awards	February 17, 2022	Best Original Score for an Animated Feature	Germaine Franco	Nominated	
Lumiere Awards	March 4, 2022	Best Feature Film – Animation	Encanto	Won	
MTV Movie & TV Awards	June 5, 2022	Best Song	Encanto Cast (for "We Don’t Talk About Bruno")	Nominated	
MTV Movie & TV Awards	June 5, 2022	Best Musical Moment	Encanto Cast (for "We Don’t Talk About Bruno")	Nominated	
NAACP Image Awards	February 26, 2022	Outstanding Animated Motion Picture	Encanto	Won	
National Board of Review Awards	December 2, 2021	Best Animated Film	Encanto	Won	
Nebula Awards	May 21, 2022	Ray Bradbury Nebula Award for Outstanding Dramatic Presentation	Charise Castro Smith, Jared Bush, Byron Howard, Jason Hand, Nancy Kruse, and Lin-Manuel Miranda	Nominated	
Nickelodeon Kids' Choice Awards	April 9, 2022	Favorite Animated Movie	Encanto	Won	
Online Film Critics Society Awards	January 24, 2022	Best Animated Feature	Encanto	Nominated	
Online Film Critics Society Awards	January 24, 2022	Best Original Score	Germaine Franco	Nominated	
Producers Guild of America Awards	March 19, 2022	Outstanding Producer of Animated Theatrical Motion Pictures	Yvett Merino and Clark Spencer	Won	
The ReFrame Stamp	March 1, 2022	2021 Top 28-Grossing Narrative Feature Recipients	Encanto	Won (Note: This award does not have a single winner, but recognizes multiple films.)	
San Diego Film Critics Society Awards	January 10, 2022	Best Animated Film	Encanto	Nominated	
San Francisco Bay Area Film Critics Circle Awards	January 10, 2022	Best Animated Feature	Encanto	Won	
Satellite Awards	April 2, 2022	Best Motion Picture, Animated or Mixed Media	Encanto	Won	
Satellite Awards	April 2, 2022	Best Original Song	Lin-Manuel Miranda (for "Colombia, Mi Encanto")	Won	
Saturn Awards	October 25, 2022	Best Animated Film	Encanto	Nominated	
Seattle Film Critics Society Awards	January 17, 2022	Best Animated Feature	Encanto	Nominated	
Society of Composers & Lyricists Awards	March 8, 2022	Outstanding Original Score for a Studio Film	Germaine Franco	Won	
St. Louis Film Critics Association Awards	December 19, 2021	Best Animated Film	Encanto	Runner-up	
Toronto Film Critics Association Awards	January 16, 2022	Best Animated Film	Encanto	Runner-up (Note: Shared with The Mitchells vs. the Machines (2021))	
Visual Effects Society Awards	March 8, 2022	Outstanding Visual Effects in an Animated Feature	Scott Kersavage, Bradford Simonsen, Thaddeus P. Miller, and Ian Gooding	Won	
Visual Effects Society Awards	March 8, 2022	Outstanding Animated Character in an Animated Feature	Kelly McClanahan, Sergi Caballer, Mary Twohig, and Jose Luis "Weecho" Velasquez (for "Mirabel Madrigal")	Won	
Visual Effects Society Awards	March 8, 2022	Outstanding Created Environment in an Animated Feature	Camille Andre, Andrew Finley, Chris Patrick O'Connell, and Amol Sathe (for "Antonio's Room")	Won	
Visual Effects Society Awards	March 8, 2022	Outstanding Virtual Cinematography in a CG Project	Nathan Detroit Warner, Dorian Bustamante, Tyler Kupferer, and Michael Woodside (for "We Don't Talk About Bruno")	Won	
Visual Effects Society Awards	March 8, 2022	Outstanding Model in a Photoreal or Animated Project	Jonathan Lin, Chris Patrick O'Connell, Christoffer Pedersen, and Alberto Abril (for "Casita Madrigal")	Nominated	
Visual Effects Society Awards	March 8, 2022	Outstanding Effects Simulations in an Animated Feature	Francisco Rodriguez, Christopher Hendryx, Brent Burley, and David Hutchins	Nominated	
Voice Arts Awards	December 18, 2022	Outstanding Animation Cast - Motion Picture - Best Voiceover	Encanto	Won	
Voice Arts Awards	December 18, 2022	Outstanding Animation Character - Motion Picture - Best Voiceover	Stephanie Beatriz as Mirabel Madrigal	Won	
Voice Arts Awards	December 18, 2022	Outstanding Dubbing - International - Motion Picture - Best Spanish Voiceover	Daniela Sierra as Dolores Madrigal	Won	
Voice Arts Awards	December 18, 2022	Outstanding Casting - Feature Film Animation - Best Casting Director	Jamie Sparer Roberts	Won	
Washington D.C. Area Film Critics Association Awards	December 6, 2021	Best Animated Feature	Encanto	Nominated	
Washington D.C. Area Film Critics Association Awards	December 6, 2021	Best Voice Performance	Stephanie Beatriz	Nominated	
Women Film Critics Circle Awards	December 14, 2021	Best Animated Female	Mirabel Madrigal	Won	
Women Film Critics Circle Awards	December 14, 2021	Best Animated Female	Abuela Alma Madrigal	Nominated	
World Soundtrack Awards	October 22, 2022	Soundtrack Composer of the Year	Germaine Franco	Nominated	
