= Seattle Film Critics Society Award for Best Animated Feature =

Award given by the Seattle Film Critics Society

The Seattle Film Critics Society Award for Best Animated Feature is one of the annual awards given by the Seattle Film Critics Society.

== Winners and nominees ==
indicates the winners.

† indicates the winner of the Academy Award for Best Animated Feature.

=== 2010s ===
Year	Film	Nominee(s)
2016
2016	Zootopia †	Byron Howard, Rich Moore, and Jared Bush
2016	Finding Dory	Andrew Stanton and Angus MacLane
2016	Kubo and the Two Strings	Travis Knight
2016	Moana	Ron Clements and John Musker
2016	Tower	Keith Maitland
2017
2017	Coco †	Lee Unkrich and Adrian Molina
2017	The Breadwinner	Nora Twomey
2017	The Lego Batman Movie	Chris McKay
2017	Loving Vincent	Dorota Kobiela and Hugh Welchman
2017	Your Name	Makoto Shinkai
2018
2018	Spider-Man: Into the Spider-Verse †	Bob Persichetti, Peter Ramsey, and Rodney Rothman
2018	Incredibles 2	Brad Bird
2018	Isle of Dogs	Wes Anderson
2018	Mirai	Mamoru Hosoda
2018	Ralph Breaks the Internet	Rich Moore and Phil Johnston
2019
2019	Toy Story 4 †	Josh Cooley
2019	Frozen 2	Chris Buck and Jennifer Lee
2019	How to Train Your Dragon: The Hidden World	Dean DeBlois
2019	I Lost My Body	Jérémy Clapin
2019	Missing Link	Chris Butler

=== 2020s ===
Year	Film	Nominee(s)
2020
2020	Wolfwalkers	Tomm Moore and Ross Stewart
2020	Onward	Dan Scanlon
2020	Over the Moon	Glen Keane and John Kahrs
2020	Ride Your Wave	Masaaki Yuasa
2020	Soul †	Pete Docter and Kemp Powers
2021
2021	Flee	Jonas Poher Rasmussen
2021	Encanto †	Jared Bush and Byron Howard
2021	Luca	Enrico Casarosa
2021	The Mitchells vs. the Machines	Mike Rianda
2021	Raya and the Last Dragon	Don Hall and Carlos López Estrada
2022
2022	Marcel the Shell with Shoes On	Dean Fleischer Camp
2022	Guillermo del Toro's Pinocchio †	Guillermo del Toro and Mark Gustafson
2022	Mad God	Phil Tippett
2022	Puss in Boots: The Last Wish	Joel Crawford and Januel Mercado
2022	Turning Red	Domee Shi
2023
2023	Spider-Man: Across the Spider-Verse	Joaquim Dos Santos & Kemp Powers
2023	The Boy and the Heron †	Hayao Miyazaki
2023	Nimona	Nick Bruno & Troy Quane
2023	Suzume	Makoto Shinkai
2023	Teenage Mutant Ninja Turtles: Mutant Mayhem	Jeff Rowe
2024
2024	The Wild Robot	Chris Sanders
2024	Flow †	Gints Zilbalodis
2024	Inside Out 2	Kelsey Mann
2024	Transformers One	Josh Cooley
2024	Wallace & Gromit: Vengeance Most Fowl	Merlin Crossingham and Nick Park
2025
2025	KPop Demon Hunters †	Maggie Kang and Chris Appelhans
2025	Arco	Ugo Bienvenu
2025	The Colors Within	Naoko Yamada
2025	Little Amélie or the Character of Rain	Maïlys Vallade and Liane-Cho Han
2025	Zootopia 2	Jared Bush and Byron Howard
