= National Board of Review Award for Best Animated Film =

Annual film award

The National Board of Review Award for Best Animated Feature is one of the annual awards given (since 2000) by the National Board of Review of Motion Pictures. Every year from 2001 to 2004 and from 2007 to 2011, 2015, 2017 and in 2020, 2021 and 2024 the award was given to the film that would eventually receive the Academy Award counterpart.

== Winners ==
=== 2000s ===
Year	Film	Director(s)
2000	Chicken Run	Peter Lord and Nick Park
2001	Shrek	Andrew Adamson and Vicky Jenson
2002	Spirited Away (Sen to Chihiro no kamikakushi)	Hayao Miyazaki
2003	Finding Nemo	Andrew Stanton
2004	The Incredibles	Brad Bird
2005	Corpse Bride	Tim Burton and Mike Johnson
2006	Cars	John Lasseter
2007	Ratatouille	Brad Bird
2008	WALL-E	Andrew Stanton
2009	Up	Pete Docter

=== 2010s ===
Year	Film	Director(s)
2010	Toy Story 3	Lee Unkrich
2011	Rango	Gore Verbinski
2012	Wreck-It Ralph	Rich Moore
2013	The Wind Rises (Kaze tachinu)	Hayao Miyazaki
2014	How to Train Your Dragon 2	Dean DeBlois
2015	Inside Out	Pete Docter
2016	Kubo and the Two Strings	Travis Knight
2017	Coco	Lee Unkrich
2018	Incredibles 2	Brad Bird
2019	How to Train Your Dragon: The Hidden World	Dean DeBlois

=== 2020s ===
Year	Film	Director(s)
2020	Soul	Pete Docter
2021	Encanto	Byron Howard
2022	Marcel the Shell with Shoes On	Dean Fleischer Camp
2023	Spider-Man: Across the Spider-Verse	Kemp Powers and Joaquim Dos Santos
2024	Flow (Straume)	Gints Zilbalodis
2025	Arco	Ugo Bienvenu

== Multiple winners ==
- Brad Bird – 3
- Pete Docter – 3
- Dean DeBlois – 2
- Hayao Miyazaki – 2
- Andrew Stanton – 2
- Lee Unkrich – 2
