= San Francisco Bay Area Film Critics Circle Award for Best Animated Feature =

Annual US film award

San Francisco Film Critics Circle Award for Best Animated Feature
- Country: United States
- Presented by: San Francisco Film Critics Circle
- First award: Henry Selick; Coraline (2009)
- Currently held by: Maggie Kang and Chris Appelhans; KPop Demon Hunters (2025)
- Website: sffcc.org

The San Francisco Film Critics Circle Award for Best Animated Feature is an award given by the San Francisco Film Critics Circle to honor an outstanding animated film.

== Winners and nominees ==
indicates the winners.

=== 2000s ===
Year	Film	Director
2009
2009	Coraline	Henry Selick

=== 2010s ===
Year	Film	Director
2010
2010	Toy Story 3	Lee Unkrich
2011
2011	Rango	Gore Verbinski
2012
2012	ParaNorman	Sam Fell and Chris Butler
2013
2013	Frozen	Chris Buck and Jennifer Lee
2013	The Croods	Kirk DeMicco and Chris Sanders
2013	Despicable Me 2	Chris Renaud and Pierre Coffin
2013	Monsters University	Dan Scanlon
2013	The Wind Rises	Hayao Miyazaki
2014
2014	The Lego Movie	Phil Lord and Christopher Miller
2014	Big Hero 6	Don Hall and Chris Williams
2014	The Boxtrolls	Graham Annable and Anthony Stacchi
2014	How to Train Your Dragon 2	Dean DeBlois
2014	The Tale of the Princess Kaguya	Isao Takahata
2015
2015	Anomalisa	Charlie Kaufman and Duke Johnson
2015	Boy and the World	Alê Abreu
2015	Inside Out	Pete Docter
2015	The Peanuts Movie	Steve Martino
2015	Shaun the Sheep Movie	Mark Burton and Richard Starzak
2016
2016	The Red Turtle	Michaël Dudok de Wit
2016	Finding Dory	Andrew Stanton
2016	Kubo and the Two Strings	Travis Knight
2016	Moana	John Musker and Ron Clements
2016	Zootopia	Byron Howard and Rich Moore
2017
2017	Coco	Lee Unkrich
2017	The Breadwinner	Nora Twomey
2017	The Lego Batman Movie	Chris McKay
2017	Loving Vincent	Dorota Kobiela and Hugh Welchman
2017	Your Name	Makoto Shinkai
2018
2018	Spider-Man: Into the Spider-Verse	Bob Persichetti, Peter Ramsey and Rodney Rothman
2018	Incredibles 2	Brad Bird
2018	Isle of Dogs	Wes Anderson
2018	Mirai	Mamoru Hosoda
2018	Ralph Breaks the Internet	Rich Moore and Phil Johnston
2019
2019	I Lost My Body	Jérémy Clapin and Marc Du Pontavice
2019	How to Train Your Dragon: The Hidden World	Dean DeBlois
2019	Klaus	Sergio Pablos
2019	Missing Link	Chris Butler
2019	Toy Story 4	Josh Cooley

=== 2020s ===
Year	Film	Director
2020
2020	Soul	Pete Docter
2020	Marona's Fantastic Tale	Anca Damian
2020	Onward	Dan Scanlon
2020	Over the Moon	Glen Keane
2020	Wolfwalkers	Tomm Moore and Ross Stewart
2021
2021	Encanto	Jared Bush and Byron Howard
2021	Belle	Mamoru Hosoda
2021	Flee (Honorable Mention)	Jonas Poher Rasmussen
2021	Luca	Enrico Casarosa
2021	The Mitchells vs. the Machines	Mike Rianda
2022
2022	Guillermo del Toro's Pinocchio	Guillermo del Toro
2022	Apollo 10 1/2: A Space Age Childhood	Richard Linklater
2022	Marcel the Shell with Shoes On	Dean Fleischer Camp
2022	Puss in Boots: The Last Wish	Joel Crawford
2022	Turning Red	Domee Shi
2023
2023	The Boy and the Heron	Hayao Miyazaki
2023	Elemental	Peter Sohn
2023	Nimona	Nick Bruno and Troy Quane
2023	Robot Dreams	Pablo Berger
2023	Spider-Man: Across the Spider-Verse	Joaquim Dos Santos & Kemp Powers
2024
2024	Flow	Gints Zilbalodis
2024	Inside Out 2	Kelsey Mann
2024	Memoir of a Snail	Adam Elliot
2024	Wallace & Gromit: Vengeance Most Fowl	Nick Park & Merlin Crossingham
2024	The Wild Robot	Chris Sanders
2025
2025	KPop Demon Hunters	Maggie Kang and Chris Appelhans
2025	Arco	Ugo Bienvenu
2025	Elio	Madeline Sharafian, Domee Shi & Adrian Molina
2025	Little Amélie or the Character of Rain	Maïlys Vallade & Liane-Cho Han
2025	Zootopia 2	Jared Bush & Byron Howard

=== Multiple wins ===
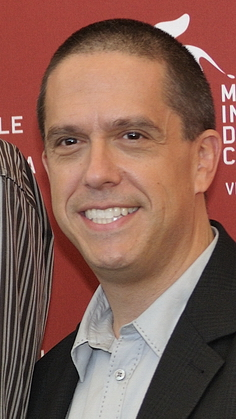
Lee Unkrich is the only director to win this award multiple times, for Toy Story 3 and Coco.

2 wins

- Lee Unkrich

=== Multiple nominations ===
3 nominations

- Byron Howard

2 nominations

- Chris Butler
- Dean DeBlois
- Pete Docter
- Mamoru Hosoda
- Hayao Miyazaki
- Rich Moore
- Dan Scanlon
- Lee Unkrich
