= Yvett Merino =

Film producer

Yvett Merino is an American film producer who served as a main producer for the film Disney's Encanto. As producer, she won the Academy Award for Best Animated Feature, with Jared Bush, Byron Howard, and Clark Spencer.

== Personal life ==
Merino's grandparents are from Mexico. Her father was a machinist, and her mother was an office manager. She grew up in Norwalk, California, and studied sociology at University of California Santa Barbara. Working as a social worker for a year, she began taking temp placements outside of that role, including at Disney.

== Career ==
Merino began with Disney Animation in the 1990s, expecting to stay for five years.

Merino was a software engineer and technology administration manager for Chicken Little (2005), and promotional support for Meet the Robinsons (2007).

Having worked up through the technology department to the role of administrative manager, Tangled (2010) producer Roy Conli asked her to manage the editing department, which made her a production manager.

She re-enrolled in school, receiving an MBA. She was a production assistant for Wreck-It Ralph (2012). Merino was a production manager and departmental leadership for Big Hero 6 (2014), departmental leadership for Zootopia (2016), production manager for Moana (2016), and studio and creative leadership for Raya and the Last Dragon (2021). Merino joined Encanto (2021) two years into development, as it started to transition to production. It is her first film where she is listed as the main producer.

Merino created an employee resource group at Disney called Voces (Voices). Separately, Encanto had a Familia Group, which would meet monthly for lunch to discuss the concept of family.

== Filmography ==
- Big Hero 6 (2014) (production manager)
- Moana (2016) (production manager)
- Encanto (2021) (producer)
- Once Upon a Studio (2023) (producer)
- Moana 2 (2024) (producer)
- Zootopia 2 (2025) (producer)
- Hexed (2026) (producer)

== Awards ==
- Encanto (2022) (NHMC Impact Awards Gala) (Producer Impact Award)
- Encanto (2022) (Academy Award) (Best Animated Feature Film)
- Once Upon a Studio (2023) (Children's and Family Emmy Awards) (Outstanding Animated Short Form Program)
