= Austin Film Critics Association Award for Best Animated Film =

Annual award given by the Austin Film Critics Association

The Austin Film Critics Association Award for Best Animated Film is an annual award given by the Austin Film Critics Association, honoring the best in animated filmmaking.

== Winners ==
=== 2000s ===
Year	Winner	Director(s)
2005	Sin City	Frank Miller and Robert Rodriguez
2006	Cars	John Lasseter
2007	Ratatouille	Brad Bird
2008	WALL-E	Andrew Stanton
2009	Up	Pete Docter

=== 2010s ===
Year	Winner	Director(s)
2010	Toy Story 3	Lee Unkrich
2011	Rango	Gore Verbinski
2012	Wreck-It Ralph	Rich Moore
2013	Frozen	Chris Buck and Jennifer Lee
2014	The Lego Movie	Phil Lord and Christopher Miller
2015	Inside Out	Pete Docter
2016	Kubo and the Two Strings	Travis Knight
2017	Coco	Lee Unkrich
2018	Spider-Man: Into the Spider-Verse	Bob Persichetti, Peter Ramsey and Rodney Rothman
2019	I Lost My Body	Jérémy Clapin

=== 2020s ===
Year	Winner	Director(s)
2020	Wolfwalkers	Tomm Moore and Ross Stewart
2021	The Mitchells vs. the Machines	Mike Rianda
2022	Marcel the Shell with Shoes On	Dean Fleischer Camp
2023	Spider-Man: Across the Spider-Verse	Kemp Powers
2024	The Wild Robot	Chris Sanders
2025	KPop Demon Hunters	Maggie Kang and Chris Appelhans

== Nominees ==
=== 2015 ===
- Anomalisa - Charlie Kaufman
- The Good Dinosaur - Peter Sohn
- The Peanuts Movie
- Shaun the Sheep Movie

=== 2016 ===
- The Little Prince
- Moana
- Tower
- Zootopia - Byron Howard and Rich Moore

=== 2017 ===
- The Breadwinner - Nora Twomey
- The Lego Batman Movie
- Loving Vincent
- Your Name

=== 2018 ===
- Incredibles 2 - Brad Bird
- Isle of Dogs - Wes Anderson
- Mirai
- Ralph Breaks the Internet - Rich Moore

=== 2019 ===
- Frozen 2
- Klaus
- Missing Link
- Toy Story 4

=== 2021 ===
- Belle
- Flee
- Encanto - Byron Howard and Jared Bush
- Luca

=== 2022 ===
- Apollo 10 1/2: A Space Age Childhood - Richard Linklater
- Guillermo del Toro's Pinocchio - Guillermo del Toro
- Mad God - Phil Tippett
- Turning Red - Domee Shi

=== 2023 ===
- The Boy and the Heron - Hayao Miyazaki
- Elemental - Peter Sohn
- Suzume
- Teenage Mutant Ninja Turtles: Mutant Mayhem

=== 2024 ===
- Flow - Gints Zilbalodis
- Inside Out 2
- Memoir of a Snail - Adam Elliot
- Wallace & Gromit: Vengeance Most Fowl - Nick Park

=== 2025 ===
- Arco
- Elio
- Little Amélie or the Character of Rain
- Zootopia 2 - Byron Howard

== Multiple winners ==
- Pete Docter - 2
- Lee Unkrich - 2
