= Arco (film) =

- French theatrical release poster
- Directed by: Ugo Bienvenu
- Written by: Ugo Bienvenu; Félix de Givry
- Produced by: Félix de Givry; Sophie Mas; Natalie Portman; Ugo Bienvenu
- Starring: Swann Arlaud; Alma Jodorowsky; Margot Ringard Oldra; Oscar Tresanini; Vincent Macaigne; Louis Garrel; William Lebghil; Oxmo Puccino
- Edited by: Nathan Jacquard
- Music by: Arnaud Toulon
- Production companies: Remembers; MountainA; France 3 Cinéma; Fit Via Vi Film Productions; Sons of Rigor
- Distributed by: Diaphana Distribution
- Release dates: 16 May 2025 (Cannes); 22 October 2025 (France)
- Running time: 89 minutes
- Countries: France; United Kingdom; United States
- Language: French
- Budget: €9.5 million
- Box office: US$5.2 million

Arco is a 2025 French animated science fantasy film co-produced and directed by Ugo Bienvenu in his feature film directorial debut, who co-wrote it with Félix de Givry. It stars Swann Arlaud, Alma Jodorowsky, Margot Ringard Oldra, Oscar Tresanini, Vincent Macaigne, Louis Garrel, William Lebghil, and Oxmo Puccino.

The film had its world premiere in the Special Screenings section of the 2025 Cannes Film Festival on 16 May, followed by a theatrical release in France on 22 October by Diaphana Distribution. It was nominated for Best Animated Feature at the Critics' Choice Awards, Golden Globe Awards and Academy Awards.

== Plot ==
Arco Dorell is a ten-year-old boy in the year 2932, an idyllic future where humans live in the clouds and travel through time using rainbow flight suits. Arco, too young to fly, steals his sister's time-traveling cape and gemstone in the night and attempts to travel to the distant past to see dinosaurs.

In the year 2075, robots perform most essential jobs and extreme weather events and wildfires are commonplace, though most infrastructure is protected by bubble-like barriers activated during such events. Ten-year-old Iris and her infant brother Peter are looked after by a kindly robot caretaker named Mikki while their parents spend the weekdays working in the city. Iris and her neighbor Clifford bike to school through debris from the previous night's violent storm, unfazed by the wreckage. Excusing herself from class to sit outside and draw, Iris sees a rainbow speeding through the sky. She follows it to its end and discovers Arco crash landed in the forest. Three eccentric brothers named Dougie, Stewie, and Frankie encounter Iris in the forest and seem to be looking for Arco. Iris sends the brothers in the wrong direction, but they find the gemstone from Arco's suit. Iris takes Arco back to her home, where Mikki tends to Arco's wounds and mends his cape.

Arco and Iris bond. Arco tells Iris about how future humans have moved into the clouds to allow the Earth to rest and Iris sketches the design of the platform homes from his description. The three brothers are tracking Arco. Arco explains that he cannot fly without the gemstone unless it's raining and sunny at the same time, which rarely happens. Mikki, unaware that Arco is from the future, calls the police in a well-meaning attempt to reunite him with his parents. Iris and Arco escape to her school to evade the police, while a massive wildfire rages over the town. Clifford sees Iris and Arco leave the house and follows them, as do the three brothers. Mikki shows up at the school with Peter, but the police robots at the scene will not allow them to enter.

The three brothers confront Arco and Iris but ultimately prove amiable and help them evade the police. They return the gem to Arco and he attempts to fly home from the roof of the school, but Iris begs to come along. As the wildfire grows stronger, a bubble barrier begins to enclose the school. Arco escapes to the outside of the barrier. Iris, assisted by Clifford despite him not wanting her to go, narrowly joins Arco on the outside of the barrier before it closes. Arco agrees to take Iris with him, but their combined weight is too heavy and they crash into the middle of the burning forest. With Peter in tow, Mikki follows the rainbow trail from Arco's flight, finding Arco and Iris unconscious amid the wildfire. Mikki tries to carry them to safety out of the forest, but falling trees force them to shelter in a cave.

Iris wakes up safe in an underground area with Arco and Peter. She finds Mikki carving detailed images of its memories into the cave wall, including one of Iris and Arco flying with a rainbow trail. When Mikki turns to face Iris, she sees it is badly damaged and on the verge of breaking down. As it dies, Mikki tells Iris to leave it and go. Iris escapes from the cave with Arco and Peter. When they reach the outside, many rainbows descend upon them. Arco immediately realizes his family has come to his rescue, but is surprised to find his parents are now elderly and his sister is an older adult. Arco's family explains that they have spent their entire lives searching through time for Arco and finally found him thanks to the cave art Mikki made. Iris and Arco say goodbye before he leaves with his family. It is hinted that Iris becomes an architect and designs the platform homes of the future, as well as beginning to invent time travel.

== Voice cast ==
Character	Voice actor	
Character	French	English
Iris	Margot Ringard Oldra	Romy Fay
Arco Dorell	Oscar Tresanini	Juliano Krue Valdi
Clifford	Nathanaël Perrot	Wyatt Danieluk
Jeanne, Iris' mother	Alma Jodorowsky	Natalie Portman
Tom, Iris' father	Swann Arlaud	Mark Ruffalo
Mikki (Note: Mikki is voiced by an overlaid dual-audio blend of Iris's parents in all the language dubs.)	Jodorowsky; Arlaud	Portman; Ruffalo
Dougie	Vincent Macaigne	Will Ferrell
Stewie	Louis Garrel	Andy Samberg
Frankie	William Lebghil	Flea
Mrs. Dorell, Arco's mother	Sophie Mas (young); Frédérique Cantrel (old)	America Ferrera
Mr. Dorell, Arco's father	Oxmo Puccino	Roeg Sutherland
Ada	Joséphine Mancini	Zoya Bogomolova (child); Michaela Celella (adult)

== Production ==
Director Ugo Bienvenu developed the film visually based on his own sketches rather than a script. He used ten to twenty drawings as the skeleton of the film and refined it further from there. Bienvenu worked on storyboarding for three years, and Felix de Givry translated the images into a script. They self-financed and hired three people to create a full-length animatic which they then used to convince investors to back the film. After securing funding and thanks to the previously developed animatic, they were able to complete production in a little over a year. Bienvenu worked to balance the handcrafted look with the requirements of managing a team of 130 people. The film shares its setting and the character Mikki with Bienvenu's 2023 Bande dessinée Le Journal de Mikki, published in English as System Preference by Titan Comics in 2025.

In May 2024, it was revealed that Natalie Portman, who also served as a producer on the film, had joined the cast for the English dub, which was written and directed by Bienvenu.

== Release ==
Arco had its world premiere at the Cannes Film Festival on 16 May 2025. A few days later, Neon acquired North American distribution rights to the film.

The film opened in the Locarno Kids section at the 78th Locarno Film Festival on 6 August 2025. The film was released in theaters across France on 22 October 2025. The film was given a week-long awards qualifying theatrical run in the United States on 14 November 2025. In December 2025, Neon announced that the film would be given a limited theatrical release in Los Angeles and New York on 23 January 2026, expanding nationwide a week later on 30 January.

In India, after an early screening at AniMela 2026 on 21 February 2026, the film was released nationwide on 28 February 2026, by Impact Films.

== Reception ==
=== Critical response ===
On the review aggregator website Rotten Tomatoes, 93% of 118 critics' reviews are positive, with an average rating of 7.5/10. The website's consensus reads: "Blending together different influences that complement each other like the colors of a rainbow, Arco soars with its clever world-building and lovable characters." Metacritic, which uses a weighted average, assigned the film a score of 72 out of 100, based on 27 critics, indicating "generally favorable" reviews.

Leslie Felperin of The Guardian said the film has much going for it, including its expressive character design and musical store, but noted "the script is a touch too derivative for its own good." David Friend of The Canadian Press described the film's "rusty charm," which evoked everything from old Saturday morning cartoons to René Laloux’s 1973 animated film "Fantastic Planet." Bavner Donaldo of Cinejour gave 4.1 out of 5 stars, praising it as "a prime example of why an animated film should never be judged by its graphic style" while highlighting its captivating time-travel adventure woven with family elements.

=== Accolades ===
Award	Date of ceremony	Category	Recipient(s)	Result	Ref.
Cannes Film Festival	24 May 2025	Camera d'Or	Ugo Bienvenu	Nominated	
Annecy International Animation Film Festival	14 June 2025	Cristal Award for Best Feature Film	Arco	Won	
Annecy International Animation Film Festival	14 June 2025	SACEM Award for Best Original Music Award in a Feature Film	Arnaud Toulon	Won	
Hollywood Music in Media Awards	19 November 2025	Original Score – Animated Film	Arnaud Toulon	Nominated	
National Board of Review Awards	3 December 2025	Best Animated Film	Arco	Won	
Washington D.C. Area Film Critics Association	7 December 2025	Best Animated Film	Arco	Nominated	
Michigan Movie Critics Guild	8 December 2025	Best Animated Film	Arco	Nominated	
Chicago Film Critics Association	11 December 2025	Best Animated Feature	Arco	Nominated	
San Francisco Bay Area Film Critics Circle	14 December 2025	Best Animated Feature	Arco	Nominated	
St. Louis Film Critics Association	14 December 2025	Best Animated Film	Arco	Nominated	
New York Film Critics Online	15 December 2025	Best Animation	Arco	Won	
Seattle Film Critics Society	15 December 2025	Best Animated Film	Arco	Nominated	
Dallas–Fort Worth Film Critics Association	17 December 2025	Best Animated Film	Arco	Runner-up	
Austin Film Critics Association	18 December 2025	Best Animated Film	Arco	Nominated	
Florida Film Critics Circle	19 December 2025	Best Animated Film	Arco	Nominated	
Las Vegas Film Critics Society	19 December 2025	Best Animated Film	Arco	Nominated	
Online Association of Female Film Critics	19 December 2025	Best Animated Feature	Arco	Nominated	
Kansas City Film Critics Circle	21 December 2025	Best Animated Feature	Arco	Nominated	
Georgia Film Critics Association	27 December 2025	Best Animated Film	Arco	Runner-up	
North Texas Film Critics Association	29 December 2025	Best Animated Film	Arco	Nominated	
New Jersey Film Critics Circle	31 December 2025	Best Animated Feature	Arco	Runner-up	
Alliance of Women Film Journalists	31 December 2025	Best Animated Feature	Arco	Nominated	
Puerto Rico Critics Association	2 January 2026	Best Animated Feature	Arco	Runner-up	
Minnesota Film Critics Association	2 January 2026	Best Animated Feature	Arco	Nominated	
Critics' Choice Movie Awards	4 January 2026	Best Animated Feature	Arco	Nominated	
Columbus Film Critics Association	8 January 2026	Best Animated Film	Arco	Nominated	
Astra Film Awards	9 January 2026	Best Animated Feature	Arco	Nominated	
Astra Film Awards	9 January 2026	Best Voice Over Performance	Natalie Portman	Nominated	
Greater Western New York Film Critics Association	10 January 2026	Best Animated Film	Arco	Nominated	
Golden Globe Awards	11 January 2026	Best Motion Picture – Animated	Arco	Nominated	
North Dakota Film Society	12 January 2026	Best Animated Feature	Arco	Nominated	
Hawaii Film Critics Society	12 January 2026	Best Animated Film	Arco	Nominated	
Utah Film Critics Association	17 January 2026	Best Animated Feature	Arco	Nominated	
Lumière Awards	18 January 2026	Best Animated Film	Arco	Won	
Lumière Awards	18 January 2026	Best Music	Arnaud Toulon	Nominated	
London Film Critics Circle Awards	1 February 2026	Animated Feature of the Year	Arco	Nominated	
Annie Awards	21 February 2026	Best Feature - Independent	Arco	Won	
Annie Awards	21 February 2026	Best Direction – Feature	Ugo Bienvenu, Adam Sillard, Anaëlle Saba	Nominated	
Annie Awards	21 February 2026	Best Music – Feature	Arnaud Toulon	Nominated	
Annie Awards	21 February 2026	Best Storyboarding – Feature	Ugo Bienvenu	Nominated	
Annie Awards	21 February 2026	Best Editorial – Feature	Nathan Jacquard	Nominated	
César Awards	26 February 2026	Best Animated Film	Arco	Won	
César Awards	26 February 2026	Best First Film	Arco	Nominated	
César Awards	26 February 2026	Best Sound	Nicolas Becker, Andrea Ferrera and Damien Lazzerini	Nominated	
César Awards	26 February 2026	Best Original Music	Arnaud Toulon	Won	
Satellite Awards	10 March 2026	Best Motion Picture – Animated or Mixed Media	Arco	Nominated	
Academy Awards	15 March 2026	Best Animated Feature	Ugo Bienvenu, Félix de Givry, Sophie Mas and Natalie Portman	Nominated	
