= Academy Award for Best Animated Feature =

Film award

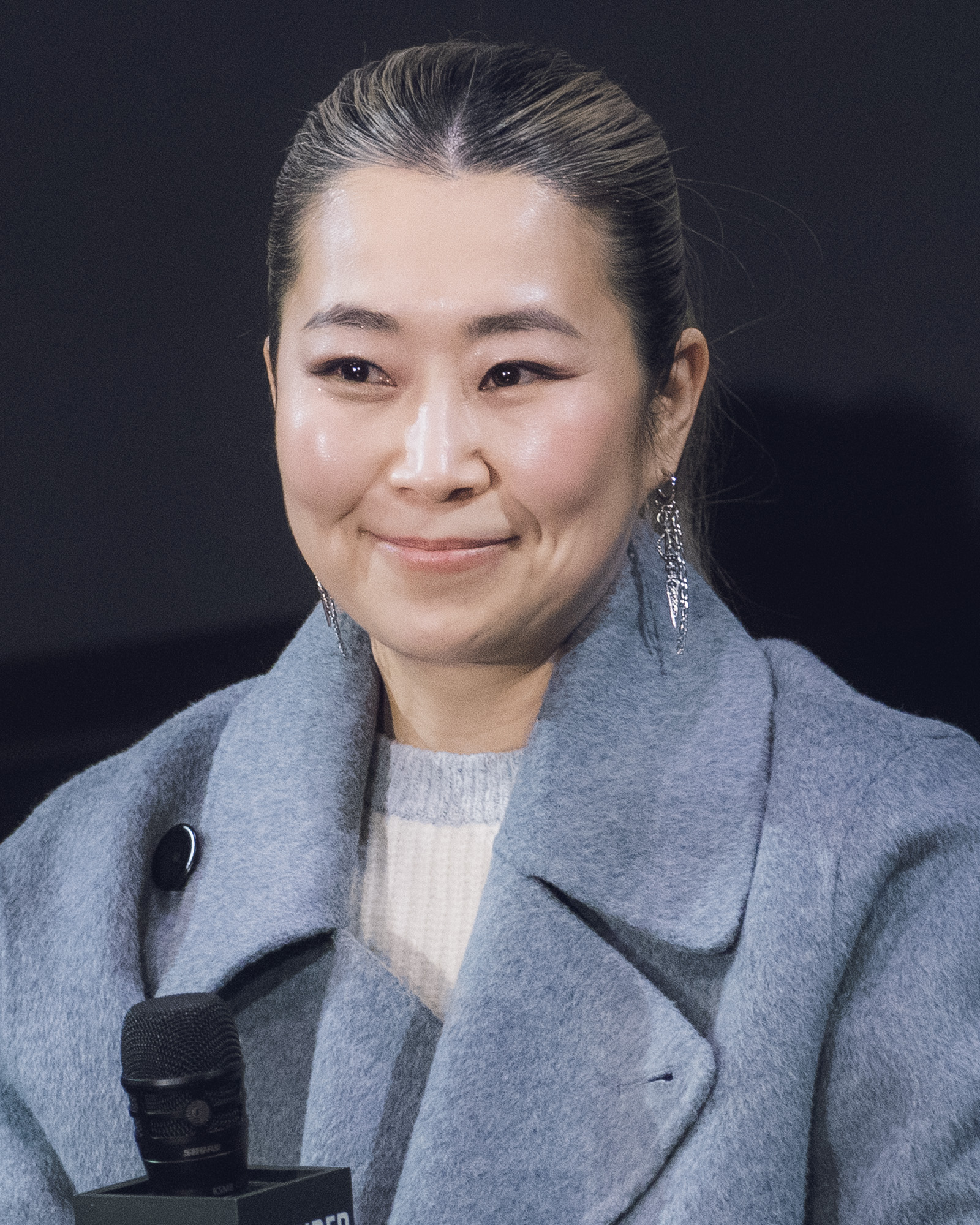
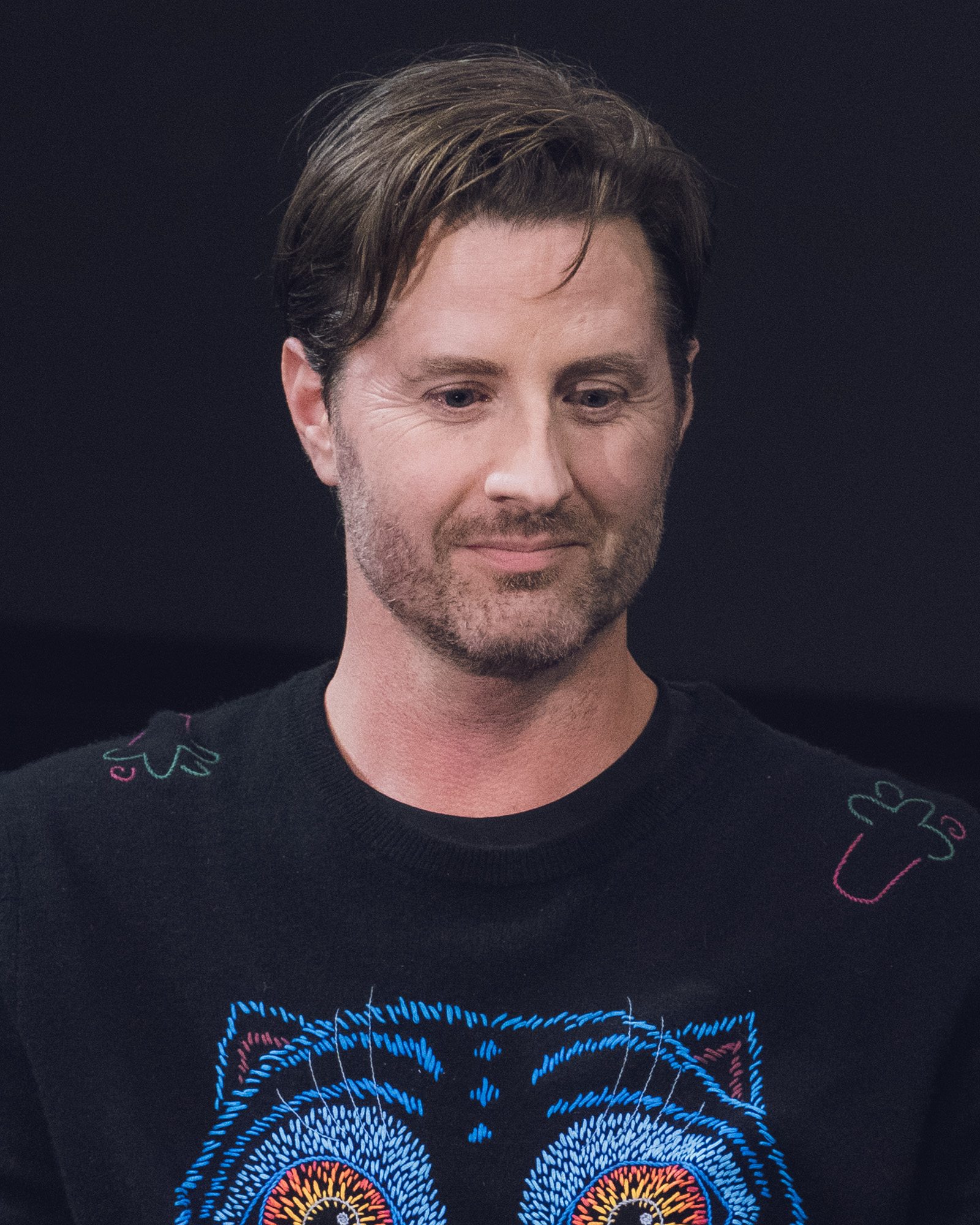
- Maggie Kang Chris Appelhans 2026 co-recipients
- Awarded for: The best animated film with a running time of more than 40 minutes, a significant number of the major characters animated, and at least 75 percent of the picture's running time including animation.
- Country: United States
- Presented by: Academy of Motion Picture Arts and Sciences (AMPAS)
- First award: Shrek (2001)
- Most recent winner: KPop Demon Hunters (2025)

Highlights
- Most awards: Pixar (11) / Pete Docter (3)
- Most nominations: Pixar (20) / Pete Docter, Byron Howard, Hayao Miyazaki, and Chris Sanders (4)
- Website: oscars.org

The Academy Award for Best Animated Feature is an Academy Award presented annually by the Academy of Motion Picture Arts and Sciences (AMPAS) for the best animated feature film. An animated feature is defined by the academy as a film with a running time of more than 40 minutes in which characters' performances are created using a frame-by-frame technique, a significant number of the major characters are animated, and animation figures in no less than 75 percent of the running time. The Academy Award for Best Animated Feature was first awarded in 2002 for films released in 2001.

For much of the Academy Awards' history, AMPAS was resistant to the idea of a regular award for animated features, considering there were simply too few produced to justify such consideration. Instead, the Academy occasionally bestowed special Oscars for exceptional productions, usually for Walt Disney Pictures, such as Academy Honorary Award for Snow White and the Seven Dwarfs in 1938, and the Special Achievement Academy Award for the live action/animated hybrid Who Framed Roger Rabbit in 1989, and Toy Story in 1996. Prior to the award's creation, only one animated film was nominated for Best Picture: 1991's Beauty and the Beast, also by Disney.

By 2001, the rise of sustained competitors to Disney in the feature animated film market, such as DreamWorks Animation (founded by former Disney executive Jeffrey Katzenberg), created an increase of film releases of significant annual number enough for AMPAS to reconsider. The Academy Award for Best Animated Feature was first given out at the 74th Academy Awards, held on March 24, 2002.

== Winners and nominees ==
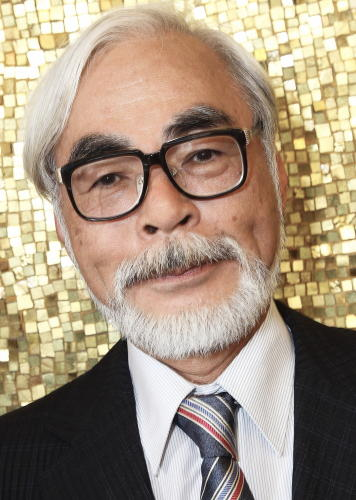
Hayao Miyazaki won twice for Spirited Away (2001) and for The Boy and the Heron (2023)

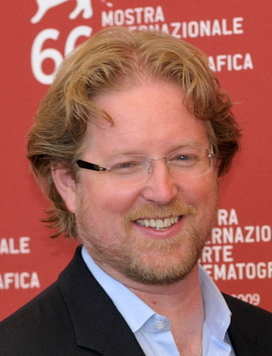
Andrew Stanton won twice for Finding Nemo (2003) and WALL-E (2008).

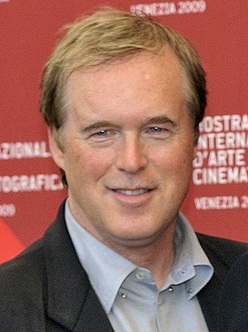
Brad Bird won twice for The Incredibles (2004) and Ratatouille (2007).

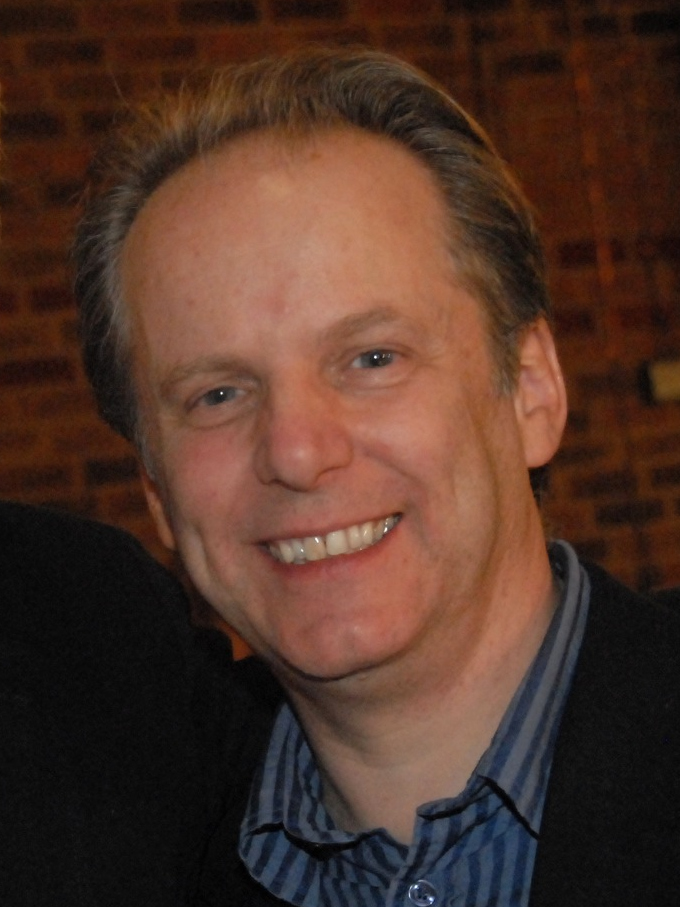
Nick Park won for Wallace & Gromit: The Curse of the Were-Rabbit (2005).

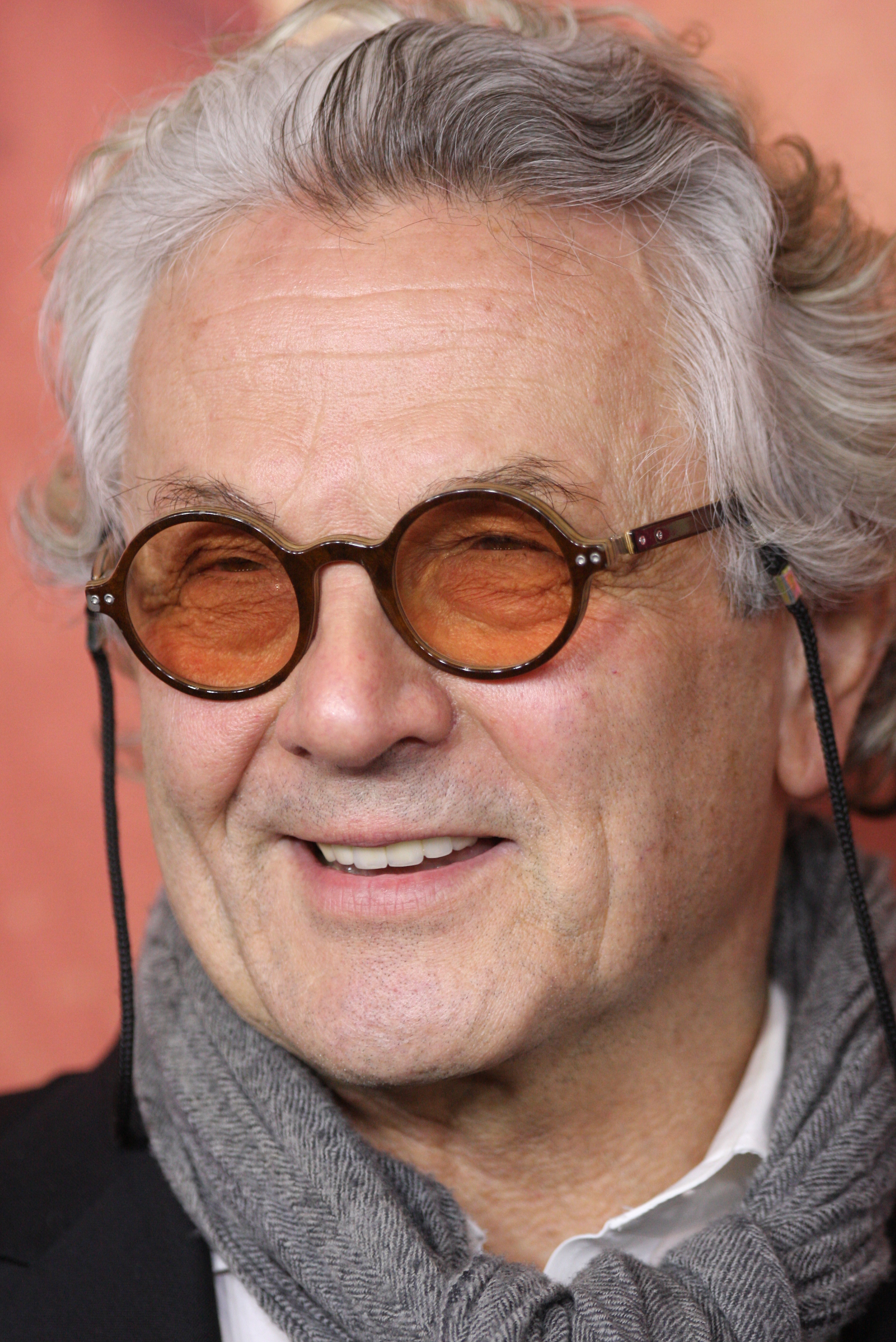
George Miller won for Happy Feet (2006).

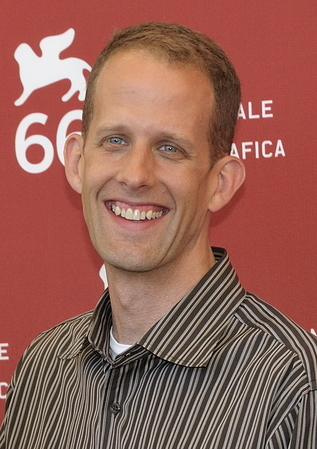
Pete Docter (Note: holds the record for most wins in this category) won thrice for Up (2009), Inside Out (2015) and Soul (2020).

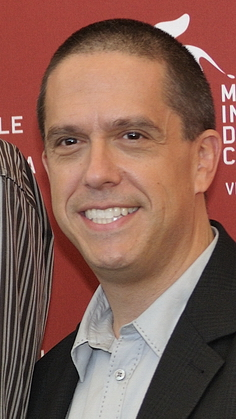
Lee Unkrich won twice for Toy Story 3 (2010) and Coco (2017).

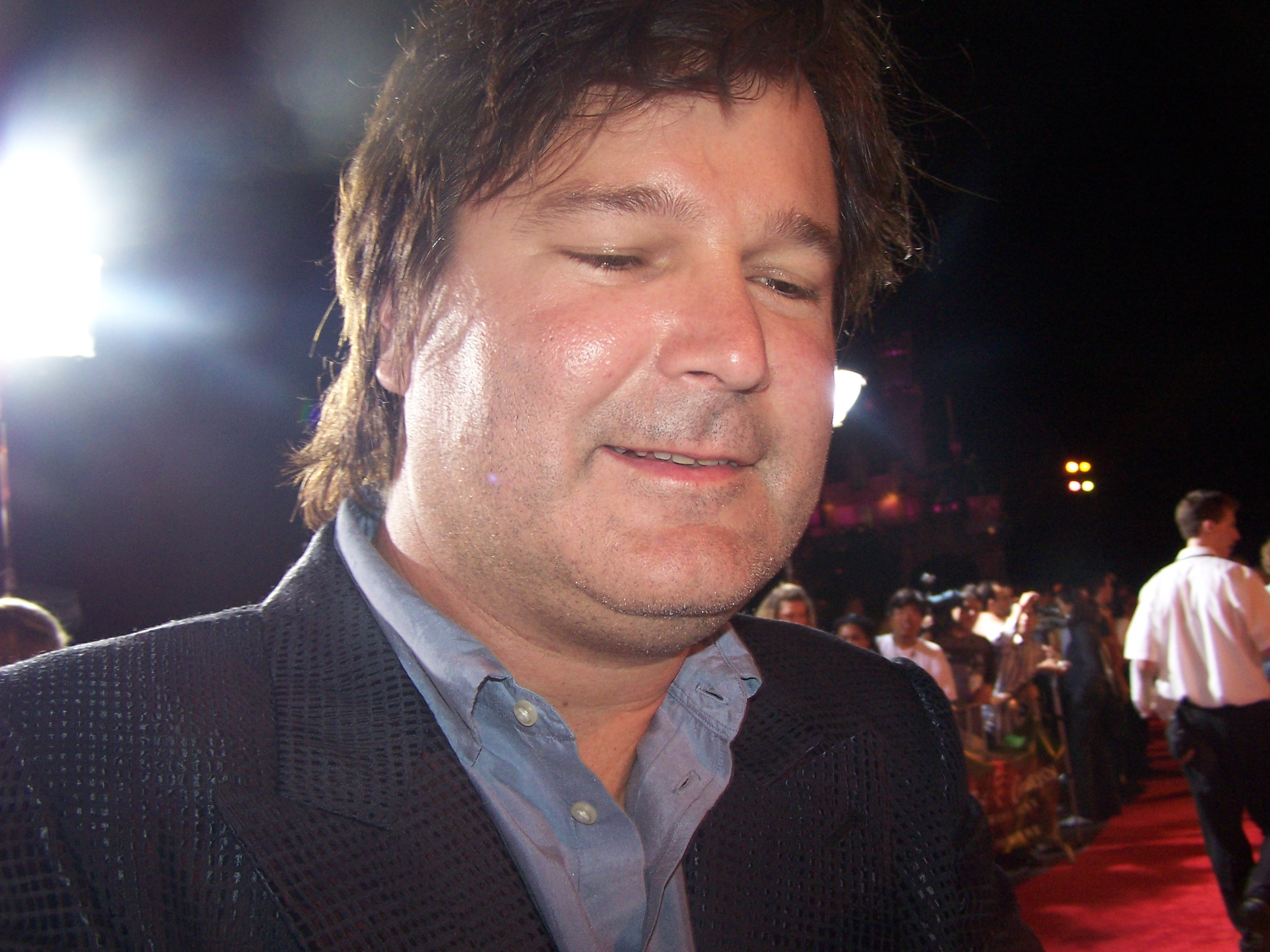
Gore Verbinski won in 2011 for Rango.

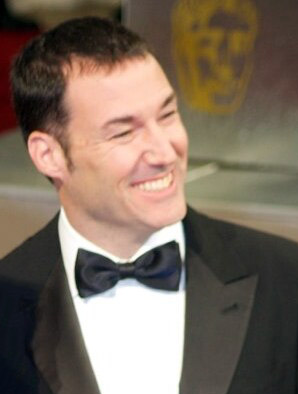
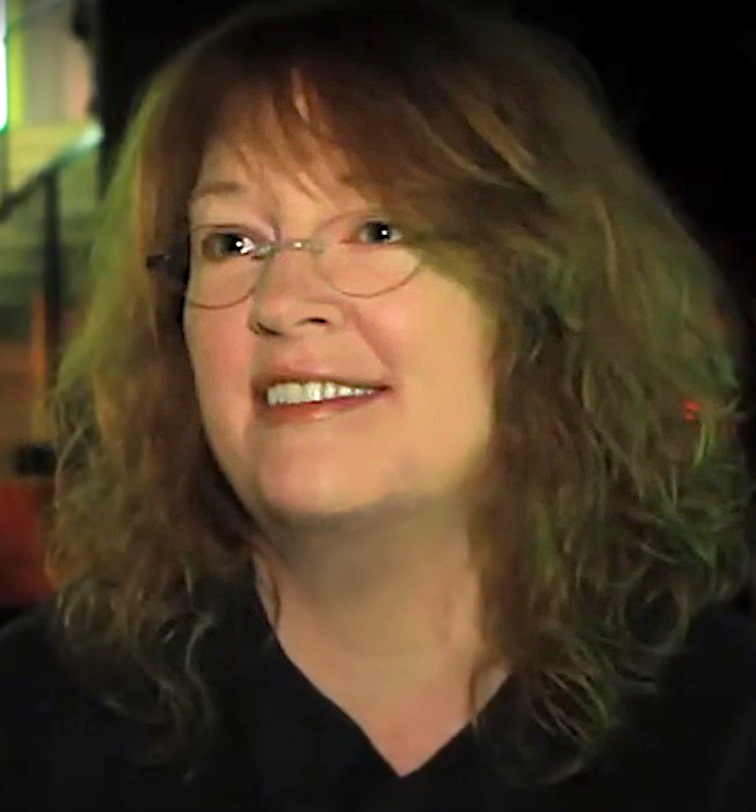
Mark Andrews and Brenda Chapman won in 2012 for Brave.
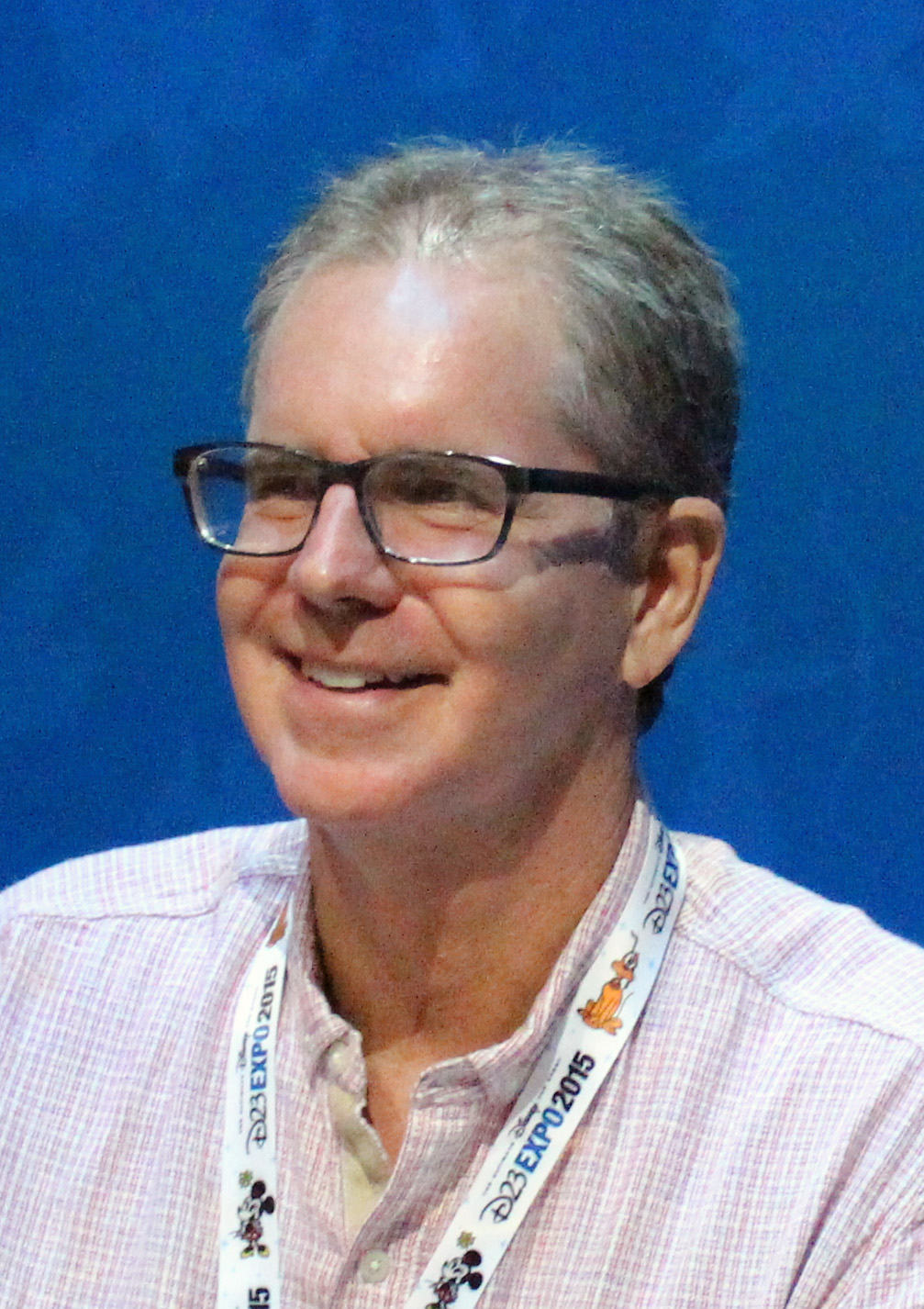
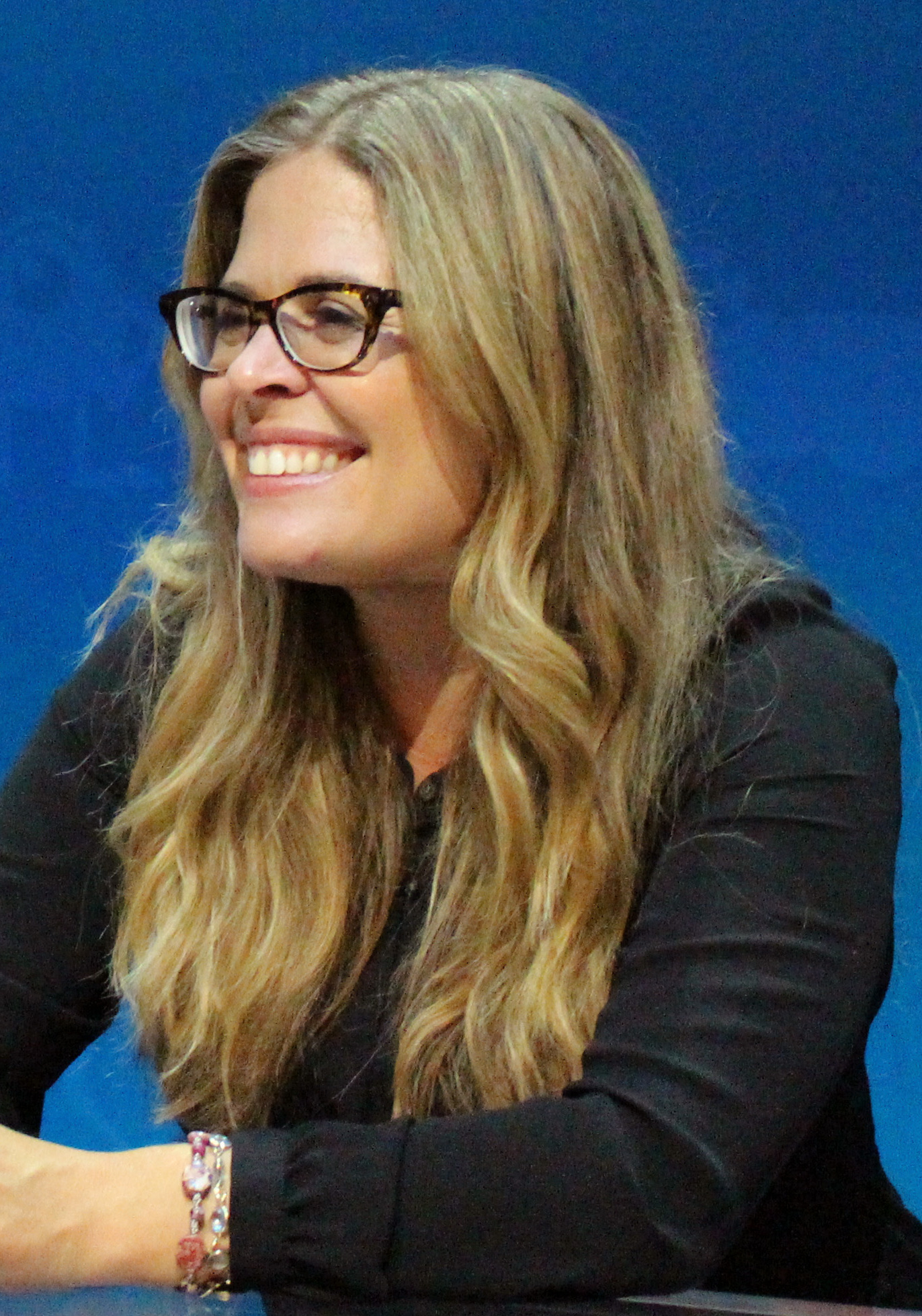
Chris Buck and Jennifer Lee won in 2013 for Frozen.

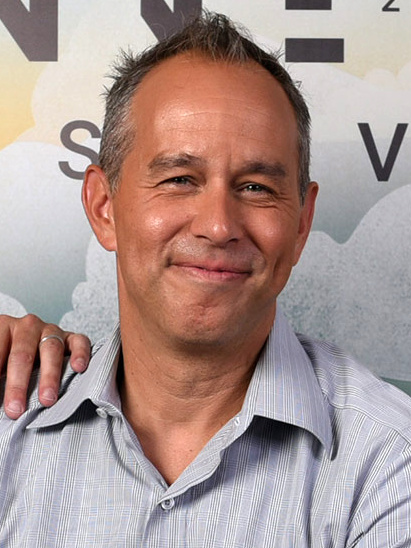
Jonas Rivera won twice for Inside Out (2015) and Toy Story 4 (2019).

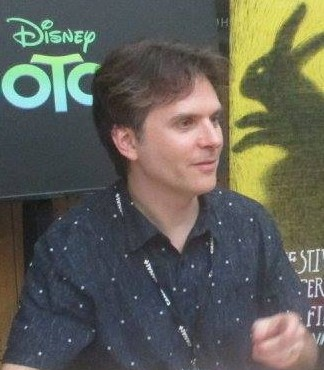
Byron Howard won twice for Zootopia (2016) and Encanto (2022).

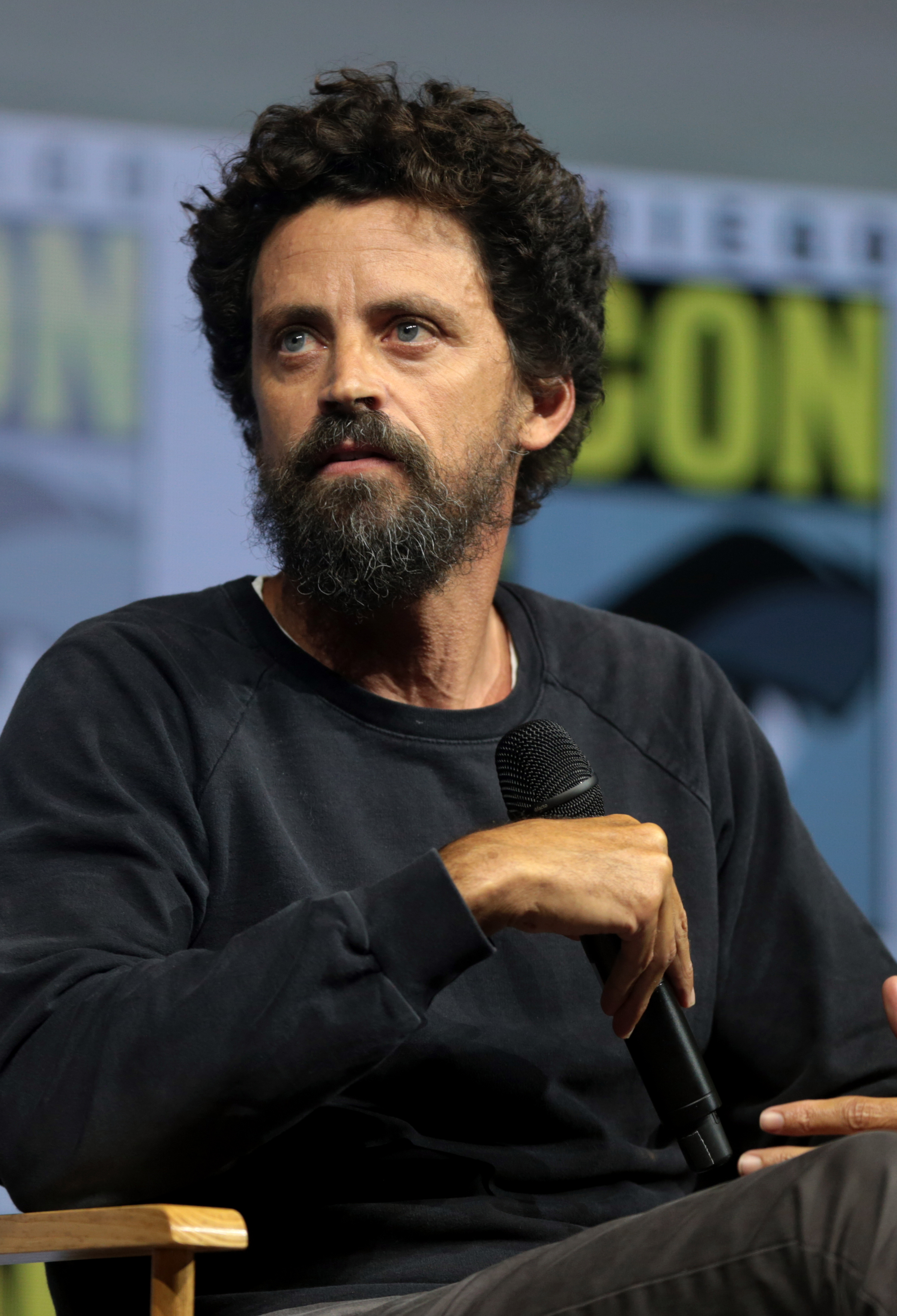
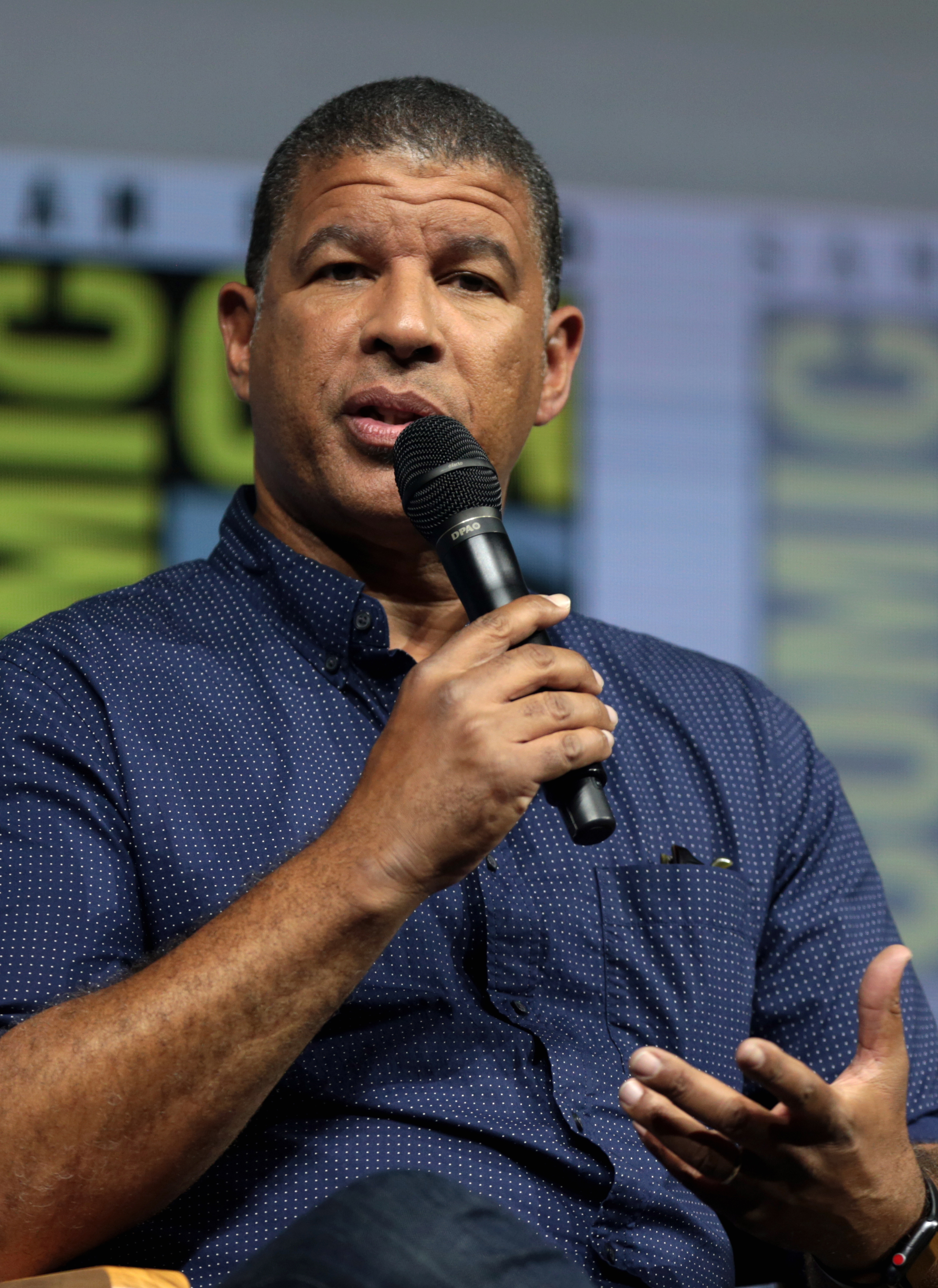
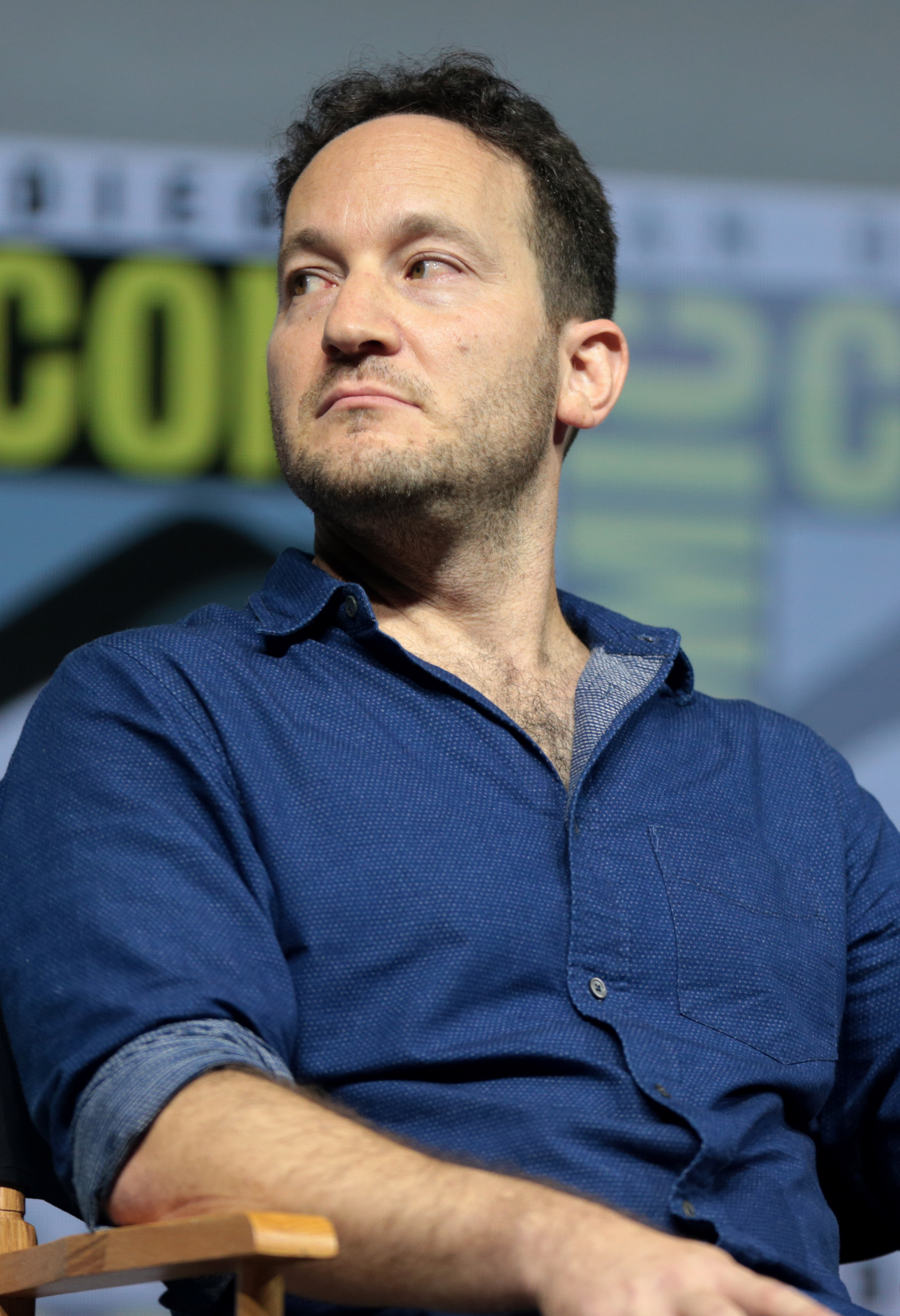
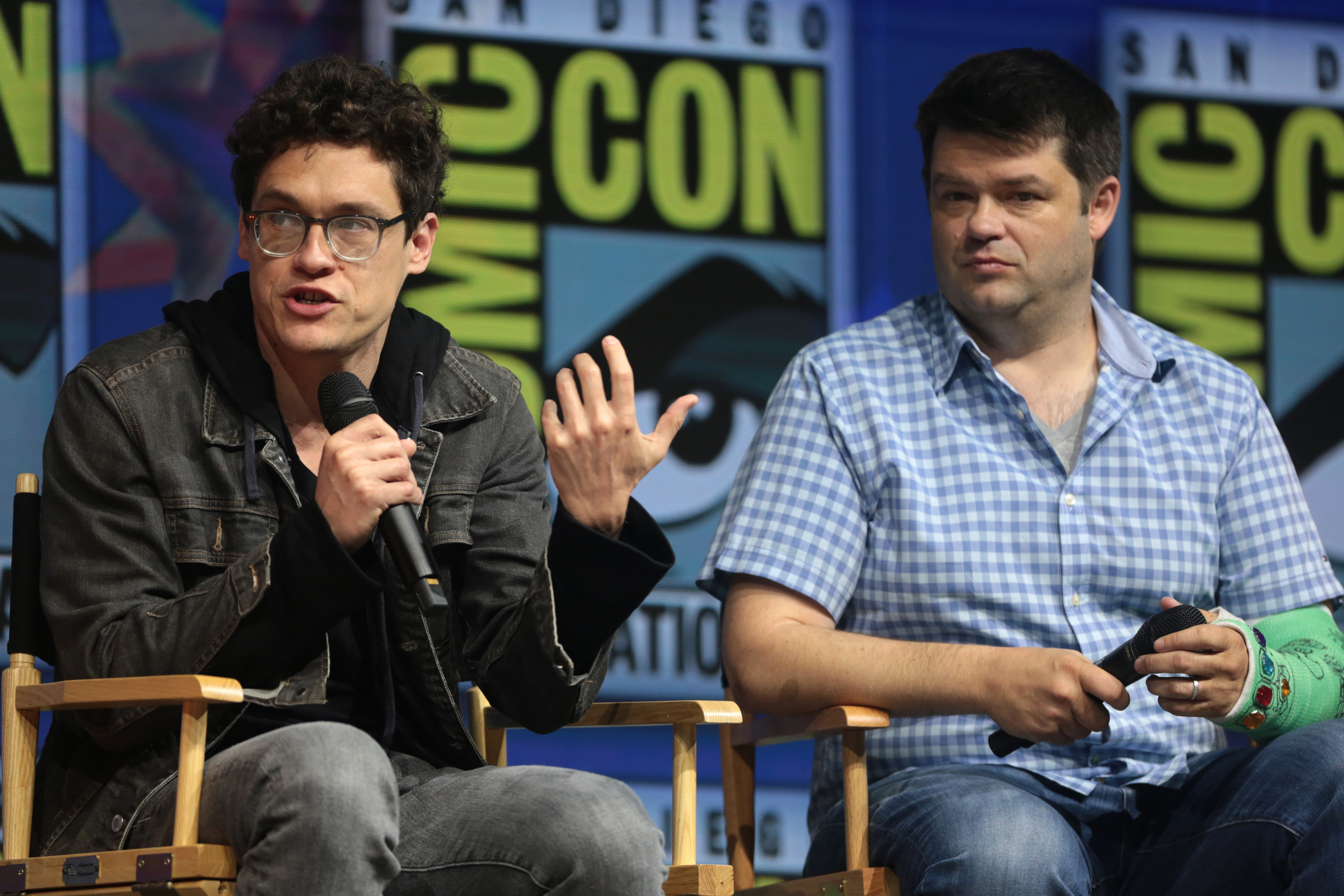
Film directors Bob Persichetti, Peter Ramsey, and Rodney Rothman, and producers Phil Lord and Christopher Miller won for Spider-Man: Into the Spider-Verse (2018).
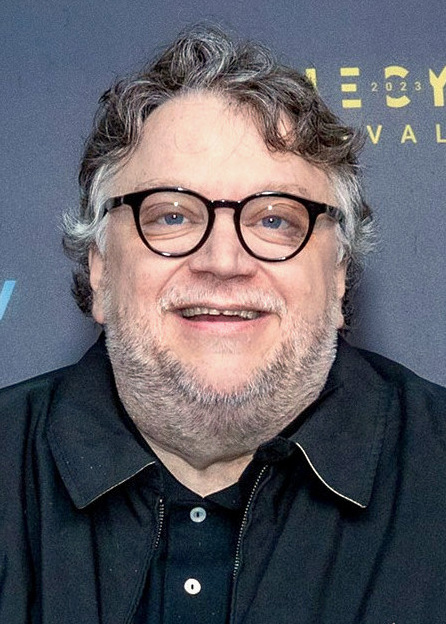
Guillermo del Toro and Mark Gustafson won in 2022 for Guillermo del Toro's Pinocchio.

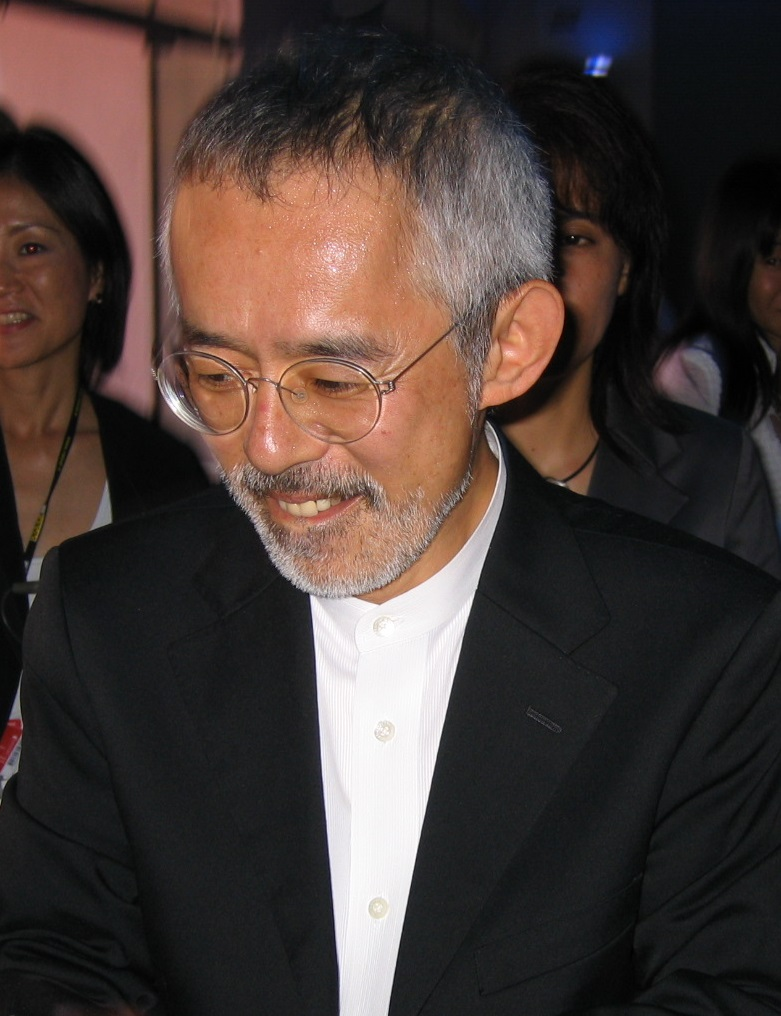
Toshio Suzuki won in 2024 for The Boy and the Heron as a film producer.

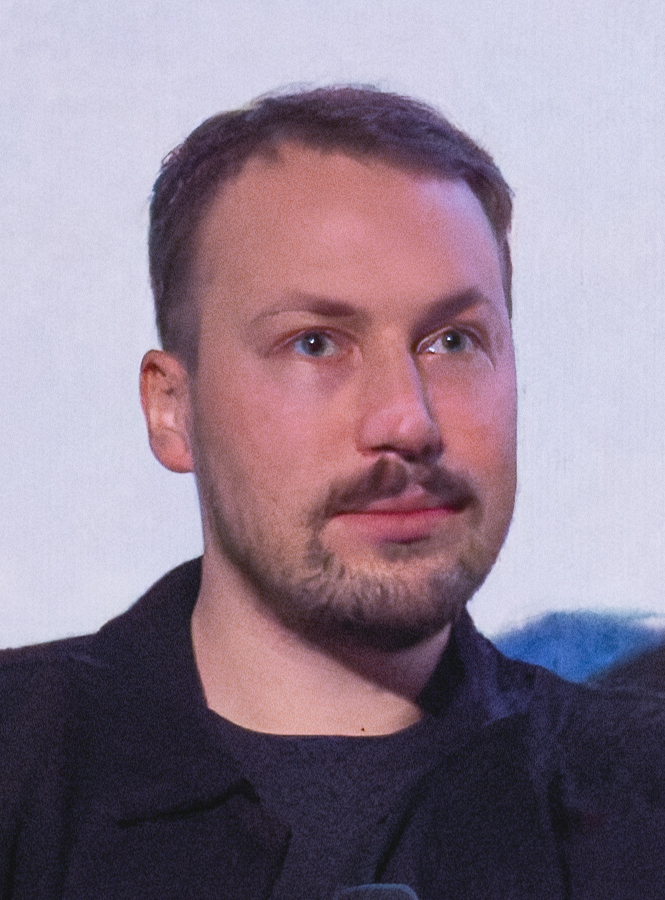
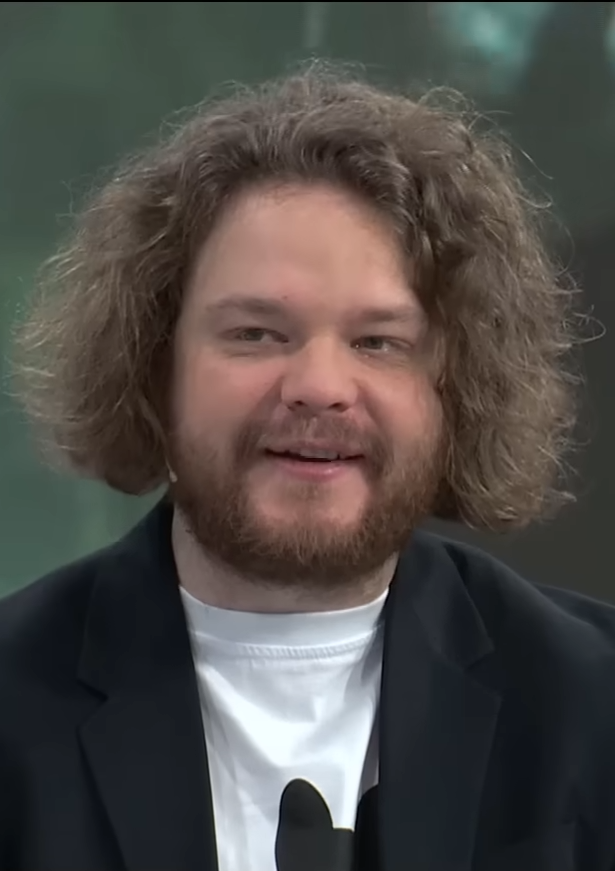
Gints Zilbalodis and Matīss Kaža won in 2025 for Flow.

When the category was first instated, the nomination went to the person(s) most involved in creating the film. This could be the producer, the director, or both. For the 76th Academy Awards in 2003, only the director(s) of the film received the nomination. For the 86th Academy Awards ten years later, this was amended to include one producer and up to two directors. For the 91st Academy Awards, this was amended once again to include up to four individuals, one of whom must be a director and one of whom must be a producer; an exception to this is that "[i]n the case of a TWO-PERSON TEAM with shared and equal director or producer credit, an additional statuette may be awarded."

The Academy included a rule that stated that the award would not be presented in a year in which fewer than eight eligible films opened in theaters. In regards of the Academy, it allows for all members to make voting for animated films more acceptable.

At the same year, the Academy enacted a new rule regarding the motion capture technique employed in films such as A Christmas Carol (2009) and The Adventures of Tintin (2011), directed by Academy Award for Best Director winners Robert Zemeckis and Steven Spielberg respectively, and how they might not be eligible in this category in the future. The new rule now reads "An animated feature film is defined as a motion picture with a running time of greater than 40 minutes, in which movement and characters' performances are created using a frame-by-frame technique. Motion capture by itself is not an animation technique. In addition, a significant number of the major characters must be animated, and animation must figure in no less than 75 percent of the picture's running time." This rule was possibly made to prevent nominations of live-action films that rely heavily on motion capture, such as Avatar (2009).

Only three films (most are live-action/animation hybrid) have been disqualified for not meeting the 75 percent of animation threshold under submission. With exceptions, it was unclear whether Marcel the Shell with Shoes On would be eligible for the award at the 95th Academy Awards due to being a stop-motion animated film with the use of live-action elements. Director Dean Fleischer Camp said that he and A24 had to submit documentation in order to prove the film had enough animation to meet the award's minimum requirements. The AMPAS officially deemed the film eligible for consideration in the Animated Feature category and was eventually nominated for said category.

Table key
Indicates the winner

=== 2000s ===
Year	Film	Nominees
2001 (74th)	Shrek	Aron Warner
2001 (74th)	Jimmy Neutron: Boy Genius	John A. Davis and Steve Oedekerk
2001 (74th)	Monsters, Inc.	Pete Docter and John Lasseter
2002 (75th)	Spirited Away	Hayao Miyazaki
2002 (75th)	Ice Age	Chris Wedge
2002 (75th)	Lilo & Stitch	Chris Sanders
2002 (75th)	Spirit: Stallion of the Cimarron	Jeffrey Katzenberg
2002 (75th)	Treasure Planet	Ron Clements
2003 (76th)	Finding Nemo	Andrew Stanton
2003 (76th)	Brother Bear	Aaron Blaise and Robert Walker
2003 (76th)	The Triplets of Belleville	Sylvain Chomet
2004 (77th)	The Incredibles	Brad Bird
2004 (77th)	Shark Tale	Bill Damaschke
2004 (77th)	Shrek 2	Andrew Adamson
2005 (78th)	Wallace & Gromit: The Curse of the Were-Rabbit	Nick Park and Steve Box
2005 (78th)	Corpse Bride	Tim Burton and Mike Johnson
2005 (78th)	Howl's Moving Castle	Hayao Miyazaki
2006 (79th)	Happy Feet	George Miller
2006 (79th)	Cars	John Lasseter
2006 (79th)	Monster House	Gil Kenan
2007 (80th)	Ratatouille	Brad Bird
2007 (80th)	Persepolis	Vincent Paronnaud and Marjane Satrapi
2007 (80th)	Surf's Up	Chris Buck and Ash Brannon
2008 (81st)	WALL-E	Andrew Stanton
2008 (81st)	Bolt	Byron Howard and Chris Williams
2008 (81st)	Kung Fu Panda	Mark Osborne and John Stevenson
2009 (82nd)	Up	Pete Docter
2009 (82nd)	Coraline	Henry Selick
2009 (82nd)	Fantastic Mr. Fox	Wes Anderson
2009 (82nd)	The Princess and the Frog	John Musker and Ron Clements
2009 (82nd)	The Secret of Kells	Tomm Moore

=== 2010s ===
Year	Film	Nominees
2010 (83rd)	Toy Story 3	Lee Unkrich
2010 (83rd)	How to Train Your Dragon	Chris Sanders and Dean DeBlois
2010 (83rd)	The Illusionist	Sylvain Chomet
2011 (84th)	Rango	Gore Verbinski
2011 (84th)	A Cat in Paris	Alain Gagnol and Jean-Loup Felicioli
2011 (84th)	Chico and Rita	Javier Mariscal and Fernando Trueba
2011 (84th)	Kung Fu Panda 2	Jennifer Yuh Nelson
2011 (84th)	Puss in Boots	Chris Miller
2012 (85th)	Brave	Brenda Chapman and Mark Andrews
2012 (85th)	Frankenweenie	Tim Burton
2012 (85th)	ParaNorman	Chris Butler and Sam Fell
2012 (85th)	The Pirates! In an Adventure with Scientists!	Peter Lord
2012 (85th)	Wreck-It Ralph	Rich Moore
2013 (86th)	Frozen	Chris Buck, Jennifer Lee, and Peter Del Vecho
2013 (86th)	The Croods	Chris Sanders, Kristine Belson, and Kirk DeMicco
2013 (86th)	Despicable Me 2	Chris Renaud, Pierre Coffin, and Chris Meledandri
2013 (86th)	Ernest & Celestine	Didier Brunner and Benjamin Renner
2013 (86th)	The Wind Rises	Hayao Miyazaki and Toshio Suzuki
2014 (87th)	Big Hero 6	Don Hall, Chris Williams, and Roy Conli
2014 (87th)	The Boxtrolls	Travis Knight, Graham Annable, and Anthony Stacchi
2014 (87th)	How to Train Your Dragon 2	Dean DeBlois and Bonnie Arnold
2014 (87th)	Song of the Sea	Tomm Moore and Paul Young
2014 (87th)	The Tale of the Princess Kaguya	Isao Takahata and Yoshiaki Nishimura
2015 (88th)	Inside Out	Pete Docter and Jonas Rivera
2015 (88th)	Anomalisa	Duke Johnson, Charlie Kaufman, and Rosa Tran
2015 (88th)	Boy and the World	Alê Abreu
2015 (88th)	Shaun the Sheep Movie	Mark Burton and Richard Starzak
2015 (88th)	When Marnie Was There	Hiromasa Yonebayashi and Yoshiaki Nishimura
2016 (89th)	Zootopia	Byron Howard, Rich Moore, and Clark Spencer
2016 (89th)	Kubo and the Two Strings	Travis Knight and Arianne Sutner
2016 (89th)	Moana	John Musker, Ron Clements, and Osnat Shurer
2016 (89th)	My Life as a Courgette	Claude Barras and Max Karli
2016 (89th)	The Red Turtle	Michaël Dudok de Wit and Toshio Suzuki
2017 (90th)	Coco	Lee Unkrich and Darla K. Anderson
2017 (90th)	The Boss Baby	Tom McGrath and Ramsey Naito
2017 (90th)	The Breadwinner	Nora Twomey and Anthony Leo
2017 (90th)	Ferdinand	Carlos Saldanha and Lori Forte
2017 (90th)	Loving Vincent	Dorota Kobiela, Ivan Mactaggart, and Hugh Welchman
2018 (91st)	Spider-Man: Into the Spider-Verse	Bob Persichetti, Peter Ramsey, Rodney Rothman, Phil Lord and Christopher Miller
2018 (91st)	Incredibles 2	Brad Bird, John Walker and Nicole Paradis Grindle
2018 (91st)	Isle of Dogs	Wes Anderson, Jeremy Dawson, Steven Rales, and Scott Rudin
2018 (91st)	Mirai	Mamoru Hosoda and Yuichiro Saito
2018 (91st)	Ralph Breaks the Internet	Rich Moore, Phil Johnston, and Clark Spencer
2019 (92nd)	Toy Story 4	Josh Cooley, Mark Nielsen, and Jonas Rivera
2019 (92nd)	How to Train Your Dragon: The Hidden World	Dean DeBlois, Bonnie Arnold, and Brad Lewis
2019 (92nd)	I Lost My Body	Jérémy Clapin and Marc du Pontavice
2019 (92nd)	Klaus	Sergio Pablos, Jinko Gotoh, and Marisa Román
2019 (92nd)	Missing Link	Chris Butler, Travis Knight, and Arianne Sutner

=== 2020s ===
Year	Film	Nominees
2020 (93rd)	Soul	Pete Docter and Dana Murray
2020 (93rd)	Onward	Dan Scanlon and Kori Rae
2020 (93rd)	Over the Moon	Glen Keane, Peilin Chou, and Gennie Rim
2020 (93rd)	A Shaun the Sheep Movie: Farmageddon	Will Becher, Paul Kewley, and Richard Phelan
2020 (93rd)	Wolfwalkers	Tomm Moore, Stéphan Roelants, Ross Stewart, and Paul Young
2021 (94th)	Encanto	Jared Bush, Byron Howard, Yvett Merino, and Clark Spencer
2021 (94th)	Flee	Charlotte de la Gournerie, Monica Hellström, Jonas Poher Rasmussen, and Signe Byrge Sørensen
2021 (94th)	Luca	Enrico Casarosa and Andrea Warren
2021 (94th)	The Mitchells vs. the Machines	Mike Rianda, Kurt Albrecht, Phil Lord, and Christopher Miller
2021 (94th)	Raya and the Last Dragon	Peter Del Vecho, Carlos López Estrada, Don Hall, and Osnat Shurer
2022 (95th)	Guillermo del Toro's Pinocchio	Guillermo del Toro, Mark Gustafson, Alex Bulkley, and Gary Ungar
2022 (95th)	Marcel the Shell with Shoes On	Dean Fleischer Camp, Andrew Goldman, Elisabeth Holm, Caroline Kaplan, and Paul Mezey
2022 (95th)	Puss in Boots: The Last Wish	Joel Crawford and Mark Swift
2022 (95th)	The Sea Beast	Chris Williams and Jed Schlanger
2022 (95th)	Turning Red	Lindsey Collins and Domee Shi
2023 (96th)	The Boy and the Heron	Hayao Miyazaki and Toshio Suzuki
2023 (96th)	Elemental	Peter Sohn and Denise Ream
2023 (96th)	Nimona	Nick Bruno, Troy Quane, Karen Ryan, and Julie Zackary
2023 (96th)	Robot Dreams	Pablo Berger, Ibon Cormenzana, Ignasi Estapé, and Sandra Tapia Díaz
2023 (96th)	Spider-Man: Across the Spider-Verse	Kemp Powers, Justin K. Thompson, Phil Lord, Christopher Miller, and Amy Pascal
2024 (97th)	Flow	Gints Zilbalodis, Matīss Kaža, Ron Dyens, and Gregory Zalcman
2024 (97th)	Inside Out 2	Kelsey Mann and Mark Nielsen
2024 (97th)	Memoir of a Snail	Adam Elliot and Liz Kearney
2024 (97th)	Wallace & Gromit: Vengeance Most Fowl	Nick Park, Merlin Crossingham, and Richard Beek
2024 (97th)	The Wild Robot	Chris Sanders and Jeff Hermann
2025 (98th)	KPop Demon Hunters	Maggie Kang, Chris Appelhans and Michelle L.M. Wong
2025 (98th)	Arco	Ugo Bienvenu, Félix de Givry, Sophie Mas and Natalie Portman
2025 (98th)	Elio	Madeline Sharafian, Domee Shi, Adrian Molina and Mary Alice Drumm
2025 (98th)	Little Amélie or the Character of Rain	Maïlys Vallade, Liane-Cho Han, Nidia Santiago and Henri Magalon
2025 (98th)	Zootopia 2	Jared Bush, Byron Howard and Yvett Merino

== Multiple wins and nominations ==
=== Nominees ===
Winners are highlighted in bold below.

Individual	Wins	Nominations	Films
Pete Docter	3	4	Monsters, Inc., **Up**, **Inside Out**, **Soul**
Hayao Miyazaki	2	4	**Spirited Away**, Howl's Moving Castle, The Wind Rises, **The Boy and the Heron**
Byron Howard	2	4	Bolt, **Zootopia**, **Encanto**, Zootopia 2
Brad Bird	2	3	**The Incredibles**, **Ratatouille**, Incredibles 2
Clark Spencer	2	3	**Zootopia**, Ralph Breaks the Internet, **Encanto**
Jonas Rivera	2	2	**Inside Out**, **Toy Story 4**
Andrew Stanton	2	2	**Finding Nemo**, **WALL-E**
Lee Unkrich	2	2	**Toy Story 3**, **Coco**
Phil Lord	1	3	**Spider-Man: Into the Spider-Verse**, The Mitchells vs. the Machines, Spider-Man: Across the Spider-Verse
Christopher Miller	1	3	**Spider-Man: Into the Spider-Verse**, The Mitchells vs. the Machines, Spider-Man: Across the Spider-Verse
Rich Moore	1	3	Wreck-It Ralph, **Zootopia**, Ralph Breaks the Internet
Toshio Suzuki	1	3	The Wind Rises, The Red Turtle, **The Boy and the Heron**
Chris Williams	1	3	Bolt, **Big Hero 6**, The Sea Beast
Nick Park	1	2	**Wallace & Gromit: The Curse of the Were-Rabbit**, Wallace & Gromit: Vengeance Most Fowl
Chris Buck	1	2	Surf's Up, **Frozen**
Jared Bush	1	2	**Encanto**, Zootopia 2
Don Hall	1	2	**Big Hero 6**, Raya and the Last Dragon
Peter Del Vecho	1	2	**Frozen**, Raya and the Last Dragon
Yvett Merino	1	2	**Encanto**, Zootopia 2
Mark Nielsen	1	2	**Toy Story 4**, Inside Out 2
Chris Sanders	0	4	Lilo & Stitch, How to Train Your Dragon, The Croods, The Wild Robot
Ron Clements	0	3	Treasure Planet, The Princess and the Frog, Moana
Dean DeBlois	0	3	How to Train Your Dragon, How to Train Your Dragon 2, How to Train Your Dragon: The Hidden World
Travis Knight	0	3	The Boxtrolls, Kubo and the Two Strings, Missing Link
Tomm Moore	0	3	The Secret of Kells, Song of the Sea, Wolfwalkers
Wes Anderson	0	2	Fantastic Mr. Fox, Isle of Dogs
Bonnie Arnold	0	2	How to Train Your Dragon 2, How to Train Your Dragon: The Hidden World
Sylvain Chomet	0	2	The Triplets of Belleville, The Illusionist
John Lasseter	0	2	Monsters, Inc., Cars
John Musker	0	2	The Princess and the Frog, Moana
Tim Burton	0	2	Corpse Bride, Frankenweenie
Chris Butler	0	2	ParaNorman, Missing Link
Yoshiaki Nishimura	0	2	The Tale of the Princess Kaguya, When Marnie Was There
Domee Shi	0	2	Turning Red, Elio
Osnat Shurer	0	2	Moana, Raya and the Last Dragon
Arianne Sutner	0	2	Kubo and the Two Strings, Missing Link
Paul Young	0	2	Song of the Sea, Wolfwalkers

=== Studios ===
Winners are highlighted in bold below.

Studio	Wins	Nominations	Films
Pixar	11	20	Monsters, Inc., **Finding Nemo**, **The Incredibles**, Cars, **Ratatouille**, **WALL-E**, **Up**, **Toy Story 3**, **Brave**, **Inside Out**, **Coco**, Incredibles 2, **Toy Story 4**, Onward, **Soul**, Luca, Turning Red, Elemental, Inside Out 2, Elio
Walt Disney Animation Studios	4	14	Lilo & Stitch, Treasure Planet, Brother Bear, Bolt, The Princess and the Frog, Wreck-It Ralph, **Frozen**, **Big Hero 6**, **Zootopia**, Moana, Ralph Breaks the Internet, Raya and the Last Dragon, **Encanto**, Zootopia 2
DreamWorks Animation	2	15	**Shrek**, Spirit: Stallion of the Cimarron, Shrek 2, Shark Tale, **Wallace & Gromit: The Curse of the Were-Rabbit**, (Note: Co-production between Aardman Animations and DreamWorks Animation) Kung Fu Panda, How to Train Your Dragon, Kung Fu Panda 2, Puss in Boots, The Croods, How to Train Your Dragon 2, The Boss Baby, How to Train Your Dragon: The Hidden World, Puss in Boots: The Last Wish, The Wild Robot
Studio Ghibli	2	7	**Spirited Away**, Howl's Moving Castle, The Wind Rises, The Tale of the Princess Kaguya, When Marnie Was There, The Red Turtle, **The Boy and the Heron**
Sony Pictures Animation	2	6	Surf's Up, The Pirates! Band of Misfits, (Note: Co-production between Aardman Animations and Sony Pictures Animation) **Spider-Man: Into the Spider-Verse**, The Mitchells vs. the Machines, Spider-Man: Across the Spider-Verse, **KPop Demon Hunters**
Aardman	1	5	**Wallace & Gromit: The Curse of the Were-Rabbit**, The Pirates! Band of Misfits, Shaun the Sheep Movie, A Shaun the Sheep Movie: Farmageddon, Wallace & Gromit: Vengeance Most Fowl
Netflix Animation Studios	1	4	Klaus, Over the Moon, The Sea Beast, **Guillermo del Toro's Pinocchio**
Nickelodeon	1	2	Jimmy Neutron: Boy Genius, **Rango**
Laika	0	6	Corpse Bride, (Note: Co-production between Laika and Tim Burton Productions) Coraline, ParaNorman, The Boxtrolls, Kubo and the Two Strings, Missing Link
Cartoon Saloon	0	4	The Secret of Kells, (Note: Co-production between Cartoon Saloon and Les Armateurs) Song of the Sea, The Breadwinner, Wolfwalkers
Les Armateurs	0	3	The Triplets of Belleville, The Secret of Kells, Ernest & Celestine
Blue Sky Studios	0	2	Ice Age, Ferdinand
Tim Burton Productions	0	2	Corpse Bride, Frankenweenie
American Empirical	0	2	Fantastic Mr. Fox, Isle of Dogs

=== Franchises ===
Winners are highlighted in bold below.

Franchise	Wins	Nominations	Films
Toy Story	2		**Toy Story 3**, **Toy Story 4**
Shrek	1	4	**Shrek**, Shrek 2, Puss in Boots, Puss in Boots: The Last Wish
Wallace & Gromit	1	4	**Wallace & Gromit: The Curse of the Were-Rabbit**, Shaun the Sheep Movie, A Shaun the Sheep Movie: Farmageddon, Wallace & Gromit: Vengeance Most Fowl
The Incredibles	1	2	**The Incredibles**, Incredibles 2
Inside Out	1	2	**Inside Out**, Inside Out 2
Spider-Verse	1	2	**Spider-Man: Into the Spider-Verse**, Spider-Man: Across the Spider-Verse
Zootopia	1	2	**Zootopia**, Zootopia 2
How to Train Your Dragon	0	3	How to Train Your Dragon, How to Train Your Dragon 2, How to Train Your Dragon: The Hidden World
Irish Folklore Trilogy	0	3	The Secret of Kells, Song of the Sea, Wolfwalkers
Kung Fu Panda	0	2	Kung Fu Panda, Kung Fu Panda 2
Wreck-It Ralph	0	2	Wreck-It Ralph, Ralph Breaks the Internet

== Superlatives ==
=== Age ===
Record	Recipient	Film	Age
Oldest winner	Hayao Miyazaki	The Boy and the Heron	83 years, 65 days
Oldest nominee	Hayao Miyazaki	The Boy and the Heron	83 years, 18 days
Youngest winner	Matīss Kaža	Flow	29 years, 183 days
Youngest nominee	Matīss Kaža	Flow	29 years, 145 days

=== Length ===
Record	Film	Length
Longest winner	Spirited Away	125 minutes
Longest nominee	Spider-Man: Across the Spider-Verse	140 minutes
Shortest winner	Flow	84 minutes
Shortest nominee	A Cat in Paris	65 minutes

== International films ==
A number of non-English-language or non-dialogue films have been nominated or won. Almost all non-English language films on this list have also been released with English-language dubbing. Winners are highlighted in bold below.

=== Japanese nominees ===
==== Studio Ghibli ====
- **Spirited Away**
- Howl's Moving Castle
- The Wind Rises
- The Tale of the Princess Kaguya
- When Marnie Was There
- **The Boy and the Heron**

==== Other films ====
- Mirai

=== French nominees ===
==== Les Armateurs ====
- The Triplets of Belleville
- Ernest & Celestine

==== Other films ====
- Persepolis
- The Illusionist
- A Cat in Paris
- My Life as a Zucchini
- I Lost My Body
- Arco
- Little Amélie or the Character of Rain

=== Other languages ===
- Chico and Rita (Spanish)
- Boy and the World (Portuguese)
- Flee (Danish)

=== Non-dialogue or fictional languages ===
- Shaun the Sheep Movie
- The Red Turtle
- A Shaun the Sheep Movie: Farmageddon
- Robot Dreams
- **Flow**

== Milestones and records ==
=== Films and production companies ===
- Pixar holds the most wins for a studio with 11, the most nominations with 20, and the most consecutive wins (4, between 2007 and 2010).
  - Pixar, with 11 wins, and Walt Disney Animation Studios, with 4, are both owned by the Walt Disney Company, which has 15 wins for the category in total.
- Laika has the most nominations without a win, with 6 films.
  - DreamWorks Animation has the most nominations after last win, with 10 films.
- Toy Story is the only franchise to win this award twice, for its third and fourth films. Additionally, the third and fourth films are so far the only two sequels to win this award.
- Shrek and Wallace & Gromit are the most-nominated franchise, with 4 (and having won once) each. Other franchises with three nominations include How to Train Your Dragon and Cartoon Saloon's "Irish Folklore Trilogy" (consisting of The Secret of Kells, Song of the Sea, and Wolfwalkers); both hold the record as the most-nominated franchises without a win.
- Of the several adult animated films (judging from their MPAA ratings), The Triplets of Belleville was the first PG-13-rated nominee, Anomalisa and Memoir of a Snail are so far the only R-rated animated films to be nominated, and The Boy and the Heron became the first PG-13-rated winner.
- Studio Ghibli (Japan) has the most wins (two) and nominations (seven) for a non-US studio; Spirited Away and The Boy and the Heron are the only non-English language films to win.
- Flee is the first animated documentary film to be nominated.
- Since 2019, each year has had at least one nominee that was mainly released via streaming, with three winners (denoted in bold): Klaus (Netflix) in 2019; **Soul** (Disney+) in 2020; Luca (Disney+) and The Mitchells vs. the Machines (Netflix) in 2021; **Guillermo del Toro's Pinocchio** (Netflix), The Sea Beast (Netflix), and Turning Red (Disney+) in 2022; Nimona (Netflix) in 2023; Wallace & Gromit: Vengeance Most Fowl (Netflix) in 2024; and **KPop Demon Hunters** (Netflix) in 2025.
- 2005 and 2011 are the only years that did not have a Disney or Pixar film nominated in the category.
- Flow is the first independent film to win the award.
  - Due to being an independent film with a minimal budget, Flow is the only film with a seven-figure budget to win.
- There were only six non-Disney/Pixar films to win the category until 2022. The consecutive wins of Guillermo del Toro's Pinocchio, The Boy and the Heron, Flow, and KPop Demon Hunters between 2022 and 2025 marked the first time that a non-Disney/Pixar film won the award four years in a row.
- KPop Demon Hunters is the first non-Disney/Pixar film to win 2 Academy Awards.

=== People ===
- Pete Docter has the most wins of any individual (3), and is tied with Hayao Miyazaki and Chris Sanders for the most nominations (4). Additionally, Miyazaki has the most wins and nominations for a non-US individual.
- Chris Sanders has the most nominations without winning (4).
- Hayao Miyazaki became the oldest winner in 2024 at the age of 83; he previously held the record between 2003 and 2023 (briefly being succeeded by Mark Gustafson for Guillermo del Toro's Pinocchio).
- Matīss Kaža became the youngest winner in 2025 at the age of 29, with Gints Zilbalodis also the second youngest winner at the age of 30, beating Andrew Stanton in a 21-year streak between 2004 (at the age of 38) and 2025.
- In diversity, Brenda Chapman was the first woman to win for Brave, Peter Ramsey was the first black director to win for Spider-Man: Into the Spider-Verse and Maggie Kang became the first Korean director to win for KPop Demon Hunters.

== Legacy ==
The winners of non-Disney/Pixar or Dreamworks Animation films led its significant influence among animation studios for its aesthetics as well as displaying statuettes at museums, solidifying animation's recognition in mainstream cinema.

- On March 20, 2024, Studio Ghibli displayed Hayao Miyazaki's Oscar statuette for a limited time at Ghibli Park's "Ghibli's Grand Warehouse" in the Broadcast Room.
- In 2025, after the success of Flow and its eventual win in the Best Animated Feature category, the statuette, along with the Golden Globe and the European Film Award, was later put on display at the Latvian National Museum of Art for a week.

== See also ==
- List of submissions for the Academy Award for Best Animated Feature
- Critics' Choice Movie Award for Best Animated Feature
- Golden Globe Award for Best Animated Feature Film
- Producers Guild of America Award for Best Animated Motion Picture
- BAFTA Award for Best Animated Film
- Lists of animated films
- List of animation awards
- List of animated feature films nominated for Academy Awards
- List of Academy Award–nominated films

== Bibliography ==
- Osborne, Robert (2013). 85 Years of the Oscar. New York: Abberville Press. ISBN 978-0-7892-1142-2.
