= Clark Spencer =

American Producer of Walt Disney Animation Studios

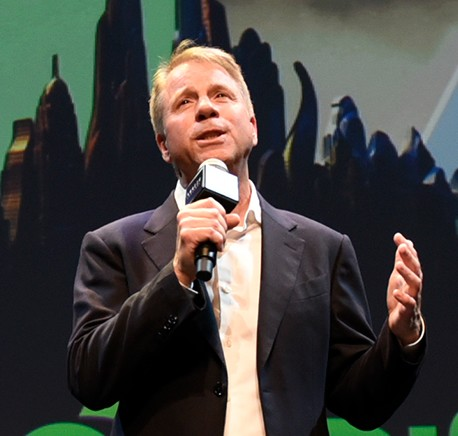
- Annecy international animated film festival 2022
- Born: Seattle, Washington, U.S.
- Education: Harvard University
- Occupations: Film producer; businessman; studio executive
- Years active: 1993–present
- Notable work: Lilo & Stitch; Bolt; Winnie the Pooh; Wreck-It Ralph; Zootopia; Ralph Breaks the Internet; Encanto
- Title: President of Walt Disney Animation Studios (2019–present)
- Awards: Academy Award for Best Animated Feature; Zootopia (2016); Encanto (2021)

Clark Spencer is an American film producer, businessman and studio executive serving as President of Walt Disney Animation Studios since 2019. He has won two Academy Awards for Best Animated Feature for his work on Zootopia and Encanto.

== Biography ==
Spencer was born in Seattle, Washington, and attended Woodrow Wilson High School in Portland, Oregon from September 1977 to June 1981. Spencer graduated from Harvard University in 1985 with a degree in history.

He joined Walt Disney Feature Animation in 1993. He was director of planning but moved on to be senior vice president of finance and operations. He moved on to the Florida animation division of the company where he was the head of studio before becoming the producer of Lilo & Stitch (2002). Since then, Spencer has gone on to also produce the Disney animated film Bolt, as well as Winnie the Pooh, Wreck-It Ralph and Zootopia.

He was involved in the purchase of Miramax Films in the early 1990s.

In August 2019, Spencer was named president of Walt Disney Animation Studios after Andrew Millstein was moved over to co-president of Blue Sky Studios.

== Filmography ==
=== Feature films ===
Year	Title	Producer	Studio Leadership
2002	Lilo & Stitch	Yes	No
2007	Meet the Robinsons	Executive	No
2008	Bolt	Yes	No
2009	The Princess and the Frog	No	Uncredited
2010	Tangled	No	Yes
2011	Winnie the Pooh	Yes	Yes
2012	Wreck-It Ralph	Yes	Uncredited
2013	Frozen	No	Yes
2014	Big Hero 6	No	Yes
2016	Zootopia	Yes	Yes
2016	Moana	No	Yes
2018	Ralph Breaks the Internet	Yes	Yes
2019	Frozen 2	No	Yes
2021	Raya and the Last Dragon	No	Yes
2021	Encanto	Yes	Yes
2022	Strange World	No	Yes
2023	Wish	No	Yes
2024	Moana 2	No	Yes
2025	Zootopia 2	No	Yes

=== Short films ===
Year	Title	Producer
2009	Super Rhino	Yes

== Awards ==
Producers Guild of America

- 2008 – Nominated: Best Animated Motion Picture for Bolt
- 2012 – Won: Best Animated Motion Picture for Wreck-It Ralph
- 2016 – Won: Best Animated Motion Picture for Zootopia
- 2018 – Nominated: Best Animated Motion Picture for Ralph Breaks the Internet
- 2022 – Won: Best Animated Motion Picture for Encanto

Academy Award

- 2016 – Won: Academy Award for Best Animated Feature for Zootopia
- 2019 – Nominated: Academy Award for Best Animated Feature for Ralph Breaks the Internet
- 2022 – Won: Academy Award for Best Animated Feature for Encanto
