= Jared Bush =

American filmmaker (born 1974)

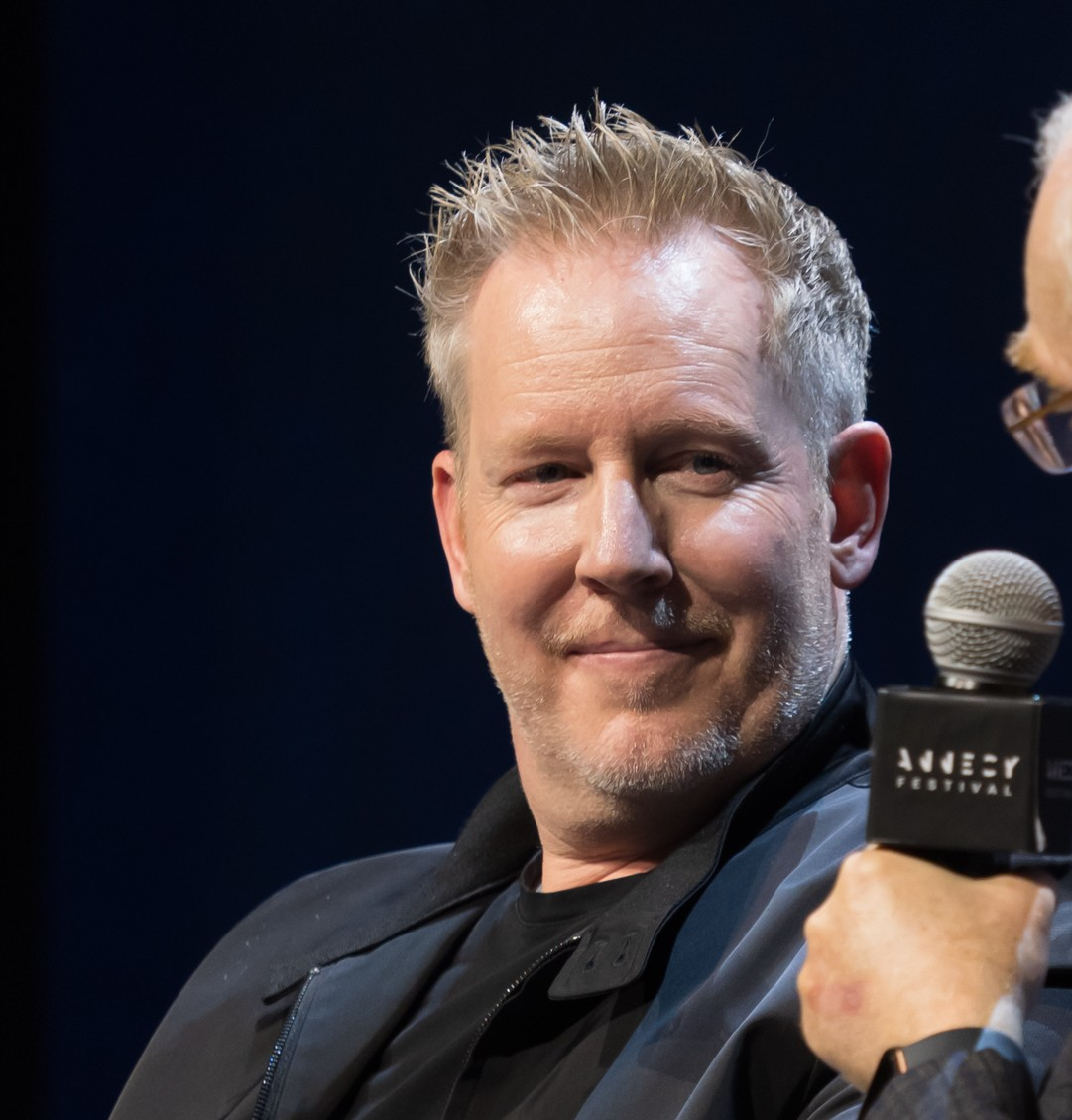
- Bush in 2025
- Born: June 12, 1974 (age 52); Gaithersburg, Maryland, U.S.
- Education: Harvard University (AB)
- Occupations: Screenwriter; director; producer
- Years active: 1998–present
- Employer: Walt Disney Animation Studios (2011–present)
- Spouse: Pamela McDonald
- Children: 3
- Awards: Academy Award for Best Animated Feature; Encanto (2021)

Jared Bush (born June 12, 1974) is an American filmmaker serving as the chief creative officer of Walt Disney Animation Studios since 2024. He is best known for co-writing and co-directing the company's animated films Zootopia (2016), its sequel Zootopia 2 (2025), and Encanto (2021), the latter of which won an Academy Award for Best Animated Feature. He also wrote the screenplays for Moana (2016), its sequel Moana 2 (2024), and its 2026 live-action remake. He also co-created and executive produced the Disney XD animated series Penn Zero: Part-Time Hero (2014–17).

== Early life and education ==
Bush was born and raised in Gaithersburg, Maryland. He attended Harvard University, where he was president of Harvard-Radcliffe Television. He graduated from Harvard with a degree in English and American literature.

== Career ==
Bush was originally hired by Walt Disney Animation Studios in 2011 on a "provisional eight-week contract". He joined the Zootopia project early on, before it evolved from a spy film into a police procedural; he was excited to work on a spy film because both his father and grandfather had worked for the Central Intelligence Agency. Several months after joining Disney, he had to personally pitch Zootopia to Disney chief executive officer Bob Iger. He later went to co-write the screenplay and co-direct the film. He returned to write the screenplay for Zootopia 2, the sequel to Zootopia, which he also directed alongside one of the first film's directors Byron Howard. Bush and Howard alongside producer Yvett Merino received an Academy Award nomination for Best Animated Feature for Zootopia 2, but lost to Sony Pictures Animation's KPop Demon Hunters. He also wrote the screenplays for Disney animated films Moana and its sequel Moana 2.

Bush co-created the animated television series Penn Zero: Part-Time Hero. In November 2018, Bush originally developed the Star Wars series Andor, writing a pilot script and series bible for the project. In 2021, Bush directed another Disney animated film Encanto about a Colombian magical family alongside Howard with Charise Castro Smith as co-director. Bush also co-wrote the screenplay alongside Castro Smith. Bush, Howard and Merino alongside another producer Clark Spencer won the Academy Award for Encanto.

On September 19, 2024, Disney Animation announced that chief creative officer Jennifer Lee was stepping down from that position to direct and write Frozen 3 and to write and executive produce Frozen 4. Bush was named as her successor.

== Personal life ==
Bush is married to Pamela McDonald. The two met while students at Harvard. They have three sons.

== Filmography ==
=== Films ===
Year	Title	Director	Writer	Executive Producer	Other	Voice	Note
2000	What Lies Beneath	No	No	No	Yes		Assistant: Mr. Rapke
2014	Big Hero 6	No	No	No	Yes		Creative Leadership
2016	Zootopia	Co-Director	Yes	No	Yes	Pronk Oryx-Antlerson	Creative Leadership
2016	Moana	No	Screenplay	No	Yes		Creative Leadership
2018	Ralph Breaks the Internet	No	No	No	Yes		Creative Leadership
2019	Frozen 2	No	No	No	Yes		Creative Leadership
2021	Raya and the Last Dragon	No	No	Yes	Yes		Creative Leadership
2021	Encanto	Yes	Yes	No	Yes		Creative Leadership
2022	Strange World	No	No	No	Yes		Creative Leadership
2023	Wish	No	No	No	Yes		Creative Leadership
2024	Moana 2	No	Yes	Yes	Yes		Creative Leadership
2025	Zootopia 2	Yes	Yes	Yes	Yes	Jürgen Ziegenkäse/Pronk	Creative Leadership
2026	Moana	No	Screenplay	No	No		
2026	Hexed	No	Yes	Yes	TBA		

=== Television ===
Year	Title	Creator	Producer	Writer	Story Editor	Composer
2000	DAG	No	No	Assistant	No	No
2002	Baby Bob	No	Co-Producer	Staff	No	No
2003	Totally Outrageous Behavior	No	No	Yes	No	No
2003	Dumber and Dumber	No	No	Yes	No	No
2003–04	Who Wants to Marry My Dad?	No	No	Yes	No	No
2003–07	All of Us	No	Co-Producer	Yes	Executive	No
2014–17	Penn Zero: Part-Time Hero	Yes	Executive	Yes	No	Yes

=== Short films ===
Year	Title	Executive Producer	Other	Voice	Notes
2022	Zootopia+	Yes	Yes	Pronk	Disney+ Original short films
2026	Lilo & Scratch	Yes	No		

=== Unrealized projects ===
- Save the Date
- Adrenaline
- Mancation

== Awards and nominations ==
Award	Date of ceremony	Category	For	Recipient(s)	Result	Ref.
BET Comedy Awards	2005	Outstanding Writing for a Comedy Series	All of Us	Jared Bush, Arthur Harris, Stacy A. Littlejohn, Lori Lakin, Jewel Wormley, Josh Wolf, Demetrius Andre Bady, Byron Hord, Ray Lancon, John Simmons, Rob Rosell, Chad Drew, Betsy Borns	Nominated	
Seattle Film Critics Award	2017	Best Animated Feature	Zootopia	Jared Bush, Byron Howard, Rich Moore	Won	
Alliance of Women Film Journalists	December 21, 2016	Best Animated Film	Zootopia	Jared Bush, Byron Howard, Rich Moore	Won	
Annie Awards	February 4, 2017	Outstanding Achievement for Writing in an Animated Feature Production	Zootopia	Jared Bush and Phil Johnston	Won	
Science Fiction and Fantasy Writers of America	May 20, 2017	Ray Bradbury Award	Zootopia	Jared Bush and Phil Johnston	Nominated	
Annie Awards	March 12, 2022	Best Animated Feature	Encanto	Jared Bush, Byron Howard, and Charise Castro Smith	Nominated	
British Academy Film Awards	March 13, 2022	Best Animated Film	Encanto	Jared Bush, Byron Howard, Yvett Merino and Clark Spencer	Won	
Academy Awards	March 27, 2022	Best Animated Feature	Encanto	Jared Bush, Byron Howard, Yvett Merino and Clark Spencer	Won	
Hugo Awards	September 4, 2022	Best Dramatic Presentation, Long Form	Encanto	Charise Castro Smith, Jared Bush, and Byron Howard	Nominated	
Imagen Awards	October 2, 2022	Best Director – Feature Film	Encanto	Charise Castro Smith, Jared Bush, and Byron Howard	Won	
Nebula Awards	May 21, 2022	Ray Bradbury Nebula Award for Outstanding Dramatic Presentation	Encanto	Charise Castro Smith, Jared Bush, Byron Howard, Jason Hand, Nancy Kruse, and Lin-Manuel Miranda	Nominated	
Academy Awards	March 15, 2026	Best Animated Feature	Zootopia 2	Jared Bush, Byron Howard, and Yvett Merino	Nominated	
Annie Awards	February 21, 2026	Best Feature	Zootopia 2	Jared Bush, Byron Howard, and Yvett Merino	Nominated	
Annie Awards	February 21, 2026	Best Writing – Feature	Zootopia 2	Jared Bush	Nominated	
British Academy Film Awards	February 22, 2026	Best Animated Film	Zootopia 2	Jared Bush, Byron Howard, and Yvett Merino	Won	
British Academy Film Awards	February 22, 2026	Best Children's & Family Film	Zootopia 2	Jared Bush, Byron Howard, and Yvett Merino	Nominated	
