= Byron Howard =

American filmmaker (born 1968)

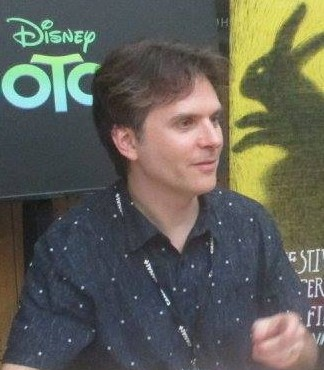
- Howard at the 2015 Annecy International Animated Film Festival
- Born: December 26, 1968 (age 57); Misawa, Aomori, Japan
- Education: Evergreen State College
- Occupations: Animator; character designer; story artist; film director; film producer; screenwriter
- Years active: 1994–present
- Employer: Walt Disney Animation Studios (1994–present)
- Awards: Academy Award for Best Animated Feature; Zootopia (2016); Encanto (2021)

Byron P. Howard (born December 26, 1968) is an American animator, character designer, story artist, film director, producer, and screenwriter. He is one of the directors of the Walt Disney Animation Studios films Bolt (2008), Tangled (2010), Zootopia (2016), Encanto (2021), and Zootopia 2 (2025). He received four Academy Award nominations, with the latter two won for Zootopia and Encanto.

== Early life and education ==
Howard was born in Misawa, Japan, and raised in both the outskirts of Philadelphia and Issaquah, Washington, United States, in a middle-class family. He attended Evergreen State College in Olympia, Washington.

== Career ==
Howard began his career at Disney as a tour guide at Disney MGM Studios. Howard had dreamed of working for Disney, and had written to Master Animator Frank Thomas, one of Disney's Nine Old Men, as he was growing up. He soon began the Disney Studio Internship and was hired in 1994, working as an animator on films including Pocahontas, Mulan, Lilo & Stitch and Brother Bear. He was nominated for a 2003 Annie Award for Character Animation for Brother Bear.

The first film Howard directed was the animated Disney film Bolt, which was nominated for the 2008 Academy Award for Best Animated Feature. In his role as co-director of the film with Chris Williams, Howard focused on character design and animation. Howard went on to direct the animated Disney films Tangled (2010, co-directed with Nathan Greno) and Zootopia (2016, co-directed with Rich Moore). He and Greno also co-directed and wrote the animated short Tangled Ever After, which features supporting characters from Tangled and showed in theaters before the 2012 3D re-release of Beauty and the Beast.

Following the making of Zootopia, Howard was one of the keynote speakers at the 2016 View Conference. He presented on the process behind the making of Zootopia and he taught the skills behind creating characters in a workshop entitled "The DNA of Disney Character Design". After his work on Zootopia, Howard worked with Lin-Manuel Miranda on Encanto. Howard co-directed the film, alongside Zootopia co-director Jared Bush and Charise Castro Smith, while Miranda wrote songs for the project, which centered on a girl from a magical Colombian family who lacks magic herself. Howard was officially announced as the co-director of Zootopia 2 on September 20, 2024, alongside Jared Bush, who the day before had become Chief creative officer of Walt Disney Animation Studios following Jennifer Lee's resignation of the position to direct Frozen 3.

In 2009, Howard became a member of the Academy of Motion Picture Arts & Sciences.

== Personal life ==
In the Fusion documentary Imagining Zootopia, Howard mentioned he is gay and has been married since 1988.

== Filmography ==
=== Feature films ===
Year	Film	Credited as							
Year	Film	Director	Story	Executive Producer	Animator	Visual Development Artist	Other	Voice Role	Notes
1995	Pocahontas	No	No	No	No	No	Yes		In-between-er
1998	Mulan	No	No	No	Yes	No	No		Animator: Yao and Fa Family Ancestors
2002	Lilo & Stitch	No	No	No	Supervising	No	Yes		Supervising Animator: Cobra Bubbles; Character Design
2003	Brother Bear	No	No	No	Supervising	No	No		Supervising Animator: Kenai - Bear
2005	Chicken Little	No	No	No	No	No	Yes		Additional Story Artist
2008	Bolt	Yes	No	No	No	No	Yes		Additional Screenplay Material
2009	The Princess and the Frog	No	No	No	No	No	No		Disney Story Trust - uncredited
2010	Tangled	Yes	No	No	No	No	Yes	Guard 2/Thug 2	Disney Story Trust - uncredited
2011	Winnie the Pooh	No	No	No	No	No	No		Disney Story Trust - uncredited
2012	Wreck-It Ralph	No	No	No	No	Additional	No		Disney Story Trust - uncredited
2013	Frozen	No	No	No	No	No	No		Disney Story Trust - uncredited
2014	Big Hero 6	No	No	No	No	No	Yes		Creative Leadership
2016	Zootopia	Yes	Yes	No	No	Yes	Yes	Bucky Oryx-Antlerson/Travis	Creative Leadership
2016	Moana	No	No	No	No	No	Yes		Creative Leadership
2018	Ralph Breaks the Internet	No	No	No	No	No	Yes		Creative Leadership
2019	Frozen II	No	No	Yes	No	No	Yes		Creative Leadership
2021	Raya and the Last Dragon	No	No	No	No	No	Yes		Additional Story, Creative Leadership
2021	Encanto	Yes	Yes	No	No	No	Yes		Creative Leadership
2022	Strange World	No	No	No	No	No	Yes		Creative Leadership
2023	Wish	No	No	No	No	No	Yes		Creative Leadership
2024	Moana 2	No	No	No	Directing	No	Yes		Additional Story, Creative Leadership
2025	Zootopia 2	Yes	No	No	No	No	Yes	Berthold Hufschmerz/Bucky/Rusty/Joel	Creative Leadership

==== Short films and series ====
Year	Title	Director	Writer	Artistic Supervisor	Executive Producer	Other	Voice	Notes
2000	John Henry	No	No	Yes	No	No		Character Animation
2009	Super Rhino	No	No	No	Yes	No		
2012	Tangled Ever After	Yes	Yes	No	No	Yes	Lantern Wrangler/Chef	
2022	Zootopia+	No	No	No	Yes	Yes	Bucky	Disney+ Original short films
2024	Iwájú	No	No	No	Yes	No		Disney+ Original long-form limited series

== Awards ==
Golden Globe Award

- 2008 – Nominated: Golden Globe Award for Best Animated Feature Film for Bolt
- 2010 – Nominated: Golden Globe Award for Best Animated Feature Film for Tangled
- 2017 – Won: Golden Globe Award for Best Animated Feature Film for Zootopia
- 2021 – Won: Golden Globe Award for Best Animated Feature Film for Encanto
- 2025 – Nominated: Golden Globe Award for Best Animated Feature Film for Zootopia 2

Academy Award

- 2008 – Nominated: Academy Award for Best Animated Feature for Bolt
- 2017 – Won: Academy Award for Best Animated Feature for Zootopia
- 2021 – Won: Academy Award for Best Animated Feature for Encanto
- 2025 – Nominated: Academy Award for Best Animated Feature for Zootopia 2

== See also ==
- List of LGBT Academy Award winners and nominees
