= The Vampire Diaries season 7 =

The Vampire Diaries
- Season 7
- Season 7 DVD cover
- Showrunner: Julie Plec
- Starring: Paul Wesley; Ian Somerhalder; Kat Graham; Candice King; Zach Roerig; Matt Davis; Michael Malarkey
- No. of episodes: 22

Release
- Original network: The CW
- Original release: October 8, 2015 – May 13, 2016

Season chronology
- ← Previous; Season 6 Next → Season 8

The Vampire Diaries, an American supernatural drama, was renewed for a seventh season by The CW on January 11, 2015, and premiered on October 8, 2015. On March 11, 2016, The CW renewed The Vampire Diaries for an eighth season, which was confirmed to be the final one in July 2016.

== Cast ==
=== Main ===
- Paul Wesley as Stefan Salvatore
- Ian Somerhalder as Damon Salvatore
- Kat Graham as Bonnie Bennett
- Candice King as Caroline Forbes
- Zach Roerig as Matt Donovan
- Matt Davis as Alaric Saltzman
- Michael Malarkey as Enzo St. John

=== Recurring ===
- Elizabeth Blackmore as Valerie Tulle
- Scarlett Byrne as Nora Hildegard
- Teressa Liane as Mary-Louise
- Todd Lasance as Julian
- Leslie-Anne Huff as Rayna Cruz
- Jaiden Kaine as Beau
- Ana Nogueira as Penny Ares
- Mouzam Makkar as Alex St. John
- Lily Rose Mumford as Josie Saltzman
- Tierney Mumford as Lizzie Saltzman

=== Special guest ===
- Annie Wersching as Lily Salvatore
- Michael Trevino as Tyler Lockwood
- Joseph Morgan as Klaus Mikaelson

=== Guest ===
- Jodi Lyn O'Keefe as Jo Laughlin (possessed by Florence)
- Tim Kang as Oscar (himself; possessed by an unknown phoenix stone vampire)
- Alex Mauriello as Krystal
- Aisha Duran as Virginia St. John
- Evan Gamble as Henry Wattles
- Ryan Dorsey as Marty Hammond (possessed by Stefan Salvatore)
- Justice Leak as Malcolm
- John Charles Meyer as young Giuseppe Salvatore
- Gavin Casalegno as young Damon Salvatore
- Luke Judy as young Stefan Salvatore
- Euseph Messiah as Ellis
- Nina Dobrev as Elena Gilbert (voice only; uncredited)

== Episodes ==
No. overall	No. in season	Title	Directed by	Written by	Original release date	Prod. code	U.S. viewers (millions)
134	1	"Day One of Twenty-Two Thousand, Give or Take"	Pascal Verschooris	Caroline Dries	October 8, 2015	3J5701	1.38
Damon, Bonnie and Alaric have been spending the summer in Europe to get over their grief, while Stefan, Caroline and Matt make a deal with Lily and her Heretics after failing to defeat them. Caroline and Bonnie miss Elena deeply and each day are writing in a diary everything that occurs so that when Elena wakes up it’ll be like she never missed anything. Stefan and Caroline evacuate the whole town to protect them from the Heretics, but agree that anyone who passes the border will be at the mercy of the Heretics. Alaric consults psychics about his dead wife, with no luck. Damon rescues Bonnie from a car accident at the last moment. When the trio get back in town, they learn about the deal with the Heretics. Damon and Bonnie make their own plan and kill a Heretic. When Lily learns about the death, she attains revenge by kidnapping Caroline with the help of Enzo. Flashforward:Three years into the future, Stefan is seen rushing into a storage unit, opening a casket containing a desiccated Damon. After reviving Damon against his wishes, Stefan proceeds to tell him that his scar opened up which means that "she's back," right as they are attacked by an old (yet unknown) foe.
135	2	"Never Let Me Go"	Chris Grismer	Brian Young	October 15, 2015	3J5702	1.40
In present day, Caroline is held prisoner at the Salvatore mansion by the Heretics. She is bound by vervain-soaked ropes, but escapes from Enzo. The Heretic girls capture her again before she can leave the house and proceed to torture her. Valerie seems to protect her by putting a spell on her which makes her skin vervain-like to vampires. It's discovered that Matt was made owner of the home and compelled to forget the fact, so Damon and Stefan can't enter their home without being invited in. They get Bonnie to temporarily stop Matt's heart so they can enter the home and rescue Caroline. Unfortunately, Caroline's vervain-like skin slows the rescue, and Stefan is forcibly ejected from the house when Matt is revived. Damon is told by Enzo that the Heretics have Elena. Lily and the Heretics perform a funeral ritual for the heretic killed by Damon and Bonnie. Lily threatens Damon into admitting to the murder of the Heretic and tells him to keep away from Mystic Falls. Bonnie chides Alaric for not coming to her instead of random psychics when he shows her an object known as the Phoenix Stone. When she examines it with her magic, her head is filled with violent images of murder and death. She tells him to destroy it. Later, Alaric tests the Phoenix stone on a corpse in the morgue. Flashforward: Three years into the future, Caroline is seen working at a TV station in Dallas, Texas, when her assistant informs her that she got a call from her fiancé saying he is planning a trip back to Mystic Falls. When Caroline hears that, she says they cannot go back there. Later, when her assistant tells her that she got a call from Stefan, she responds angrily telling him to never accept calls from him. She and her assistant are then shot with stakes by an unknown person.
136	3	"Age of Innocence"	Michael Allowitz	Melinda Hsu Taylor & Holly Brix	October 22, 2015	3J5703	1.20
Damon sets off on a road trip with Bonnie and Alaric in search of leverage they can use against his mother. The trio searches for and meets the last heretic, Oscar, who used the pretext of a mission for Lily to defect from the group. Damon asks for Oscar's help in siphoning magic from Bonnie who is still getting horrible visions after touching the Phoenix Stone. Oscar refuses to help when he finds out about the stone, fleeing after knocking Alaric and Bonnie unconscious, and breaking Damon's neck. The trio captures Oscar and makes a deal with Lily in exchange for Elena's coffin. Meanwhile, Caroline, still being held hostage by the Heretics, learns some information about Valerie's past. Flashbacks to 1863 show Valerie meeting Stefan for the first time. Valerie was sent by Lily to check on her son, but she and Stefan fell in love and enjoyed a sensual evening together. When Valerie was forced to leave by her chaperone, Julian, she promised Stefan she would return. As Valerie tries to do just that, she is found out by Julian, who beats her so badly she loses Stefan's unborn child before dragging her to the ship. There, Valerie killed herself which turned her into the very first heretic as she had died with Lily's blood in her system. At the same time, Stefan learns a few unexpected details about his own past from Lily about how she first met Valerie. Also, Alaric turns to Bonnie for her help after admitting that he still has the Phoenix Stone, which can bring the dead back to life. Lily sets Caroline free out of admiration for Stefan's honesty with her. Valerie kills Oscar because he has found Julian, the murderer of her baby and the love of Lily's life. Flashforward: Three years later, Tyler is seen driving around in New York City when he gets a call from a frantic Stefan, who tells him that his scar opened up and that he needs Tyler to get hold of Caroline to warn her as she is not taking his calls. Stefan is about to leave town and sets his car on fire.
137	4	"I Carry Your Heart with Me"	Jeffrey Hunt	Neil Reynolds	October 29, 2015	3J5704	1.24
On Halloween, Stefan and Damon desperately hide Oscar's corpse, as his death disables their exchange plan with Lily. Bonnie and Alaric are in the morgue, preparing to resurrect Jo when Damon rushes in carrying Oscar's body. Meanwhile, the heretic girls, Nora and Mary Louise, come searching for the corpse. Lily instructs Nora and Mary Louise to kill a student at Whitmore College every hour unless Oscar is returned to her. So, Stefan and Caroline team up to lure Nora and Mary Louise to Whitmore's annual Heaven and Hell dance to keep an eye on the couple, while Damon, Bonnie and Alaric try to resurrect Oscar using the Phoenix Stone. Valerie confides in Enzo about killing Oscar in order to prevent him from detailing the whereabouts of Lily's former lover, Julian, with whom Valerie has a past. Flashforward: Three years later, Alaric is seen trying to fix a teddy bear revealing that he is the father to two daughters. When they become quiet, he goes to the front door and sees them looking at Damon, who threatens Alaric in order to be let in.
138	5	"Live Through This"	Kellie Cyrus	Rebecca Sonnenshine	November 5, 2015	3J5705	1.34
Damon and Stefan team up with Valerie, who is searching for Julian's coffin to destroy it. Meanwhile, Rick is dealing with Jo to cope things after she becomes alive again. Bonnie goes to the Salvatore manor to ask Oscar, who is under Enzo's watch, about the Phoenix stone but is attacked by him. Enzo gets the Phoenix stone as Bonnie loses it when she tries to run away from Oscar. Enzo then stabs Oscar when he becomes unmanageable. When the Salvatore brothers and Valerie reach their location, she explains that the Phoenix stone does not bring people alive but it transferres vampire souls imprisoned in the stone into a body. Just as Valerie tries to burn Julian's corpse, Lily and the Heretics arrive and rescue him. Valerie, who for her actions are left alone by the Heretics, tells Damon that it was Lily's plan to make Elena sleep as long as Bonnie is alive. Damon tries to murder Lily but they escape by making coffins explode and injuring Stefan, Damon and Valerie. Back in the Salvatore house, Enzo, in possession of Phoenix stone, makes Lily choose between him and Julian but Lily chooses the latter and disappointed, Enzo gives her the stone. With the stone, the Heretics revive Julian. Bonnie sadly informs Rick about the stone and that Jo's body might not have his wife's soul. Bonnie is joined by Damon who vows to get revenge on Lily who destroys everything that makes him happy. Flashforward: Three years later, Bonnie is living in a mental institution and during a group session, expresses guilt for what she has done in the past. When she goes back to her room, she finds Enzo, who remarks that she needs to come home. They then kiss.
139	6	"Best Served Cold"	Darren Genet	Caroline Dries	November 12, 2015	3J5706	1.32
Lily and the Heretics throw a party at Salvatore manor which Stefan and Damon also attend. Bonnie arrives with Enzo and she tries to make Lily jealous for Enzo. Meanwhile, Rick deals with Jo and her suddenly declining health. Valerie and Caroline arrive there, where Valerie explains that Jo was human and the vampire soul is not compatible with her body which meant that she was as good as dead. Back in the manor, Julian and the Salvatore brothers get into an argument which brings them to fight until Lily intervenes and says she will never let her children suffer. Rick has to let go of Jo but Valerie finds out the twins are still alive. They then make a locator spell which seems to points nowhere but shockingly Valerie deduces that the twins are inside Caroline's body. Flashforward: Three years from now on, Damon arrives at Rick's home to talk about his twins. While they are in deep conversation, Caroline, who is now a production manager at a news channel and engaged to Alaric, appears on television bloodied announcing there is a message for Stefan Salvatore.
140	7	"Mommie Dearest"	Tony Solomons	Chad Fiveash & James Stoteraux	November 19, 2015	3J5707	1.10
In order to get through to Lily about Julian's manipulating ways, Stefan and Damon confront their mother with painful memories from their childhood. However, when Lily reveals a dark secret she's been harboring for over 160 years, Stefan and Damon are left questioning everything they've ever known about their family. Determined to prove himself to Lily, Enzo comes face to face with Julian and challenges him to a duel, but an unexpected twist threatens to complicate things. Elsewhere, Matt finds himself in the middle of a deepening mystery involving the residents of Mystic Falls, and Caroline's world is turned upside down when Valerie reveals some life-changing news to her. Flashforward: Three years later, Damon and Alaric are seen on their way to find Caroline after they assume she is being held captive at the TV station. They argue on how to save her also mentioning Stefan, talking that his scar opened up and that he will try to interfere. Damon goes in to the TV station, however Caroline is not there and he is shot with vervain darts by an unknown person.
141	8	"Hold Me, Thrill Me, Kiss Me, Kill Me"	Leslie Libman	Brett Matthews	December 3, 2015	3J5708	1.31
Lily, Damon and Stefan plan killing Julian which requires unlinking him from Lily with the help of the Heretics. Caroline informs Stefan about her pregnancy who finally comes to terms with it. Enzo warns Lily of the impending threat to her life and they share a moment. Later, Enzo is kidnapped by Matt and his troop. Valerie and the Salvatore brothers corner Julian but are interrupted by Mary Louise. Julian forces Lily to choose between killing Valerie or Damon. Unaware that the unlinking's already done, Lily stakes herself, thinking this could kill Julian. Nora breaks up with Mary Louise as the latter sided with Julian instead of Lily. Everybody then says their goodbyes to Lily before her death, except Damon, who coldly dismisses her for Elena's sleep spell. Flashforward: Damon is held captive by some woman whom he hallucinates as Lily and thus asks forgiveness for his harsh goodbye. In return, the woman tell him that he is hallucinating as Lily has long died and he too will die soon of werewolf venom. Then, she knocks him down unconscious.
142	9	"Cold as Ice"	Geoffrey Wing Shotz	Brian Young	December 10, 2015	3J5709	1.18
Lily is put to rest. Stefan and Damon's search for Julian leads them to a bar outside of Mystic Falls filled with dead Santas. As Julian arrives with his minions, the two parties tiff up which later aggravates back home. Nora and Bonnie become friends during a toy drive. Caroline is struggling with her pregnancy as her feeding urges keep her on the edge; she visits her mom's grave for some peace. The fight between the Salvatore brothers and Julian finally leads to him staking Damon with the Phoenix sword, ergo trapping his soul inside the Phoenix hell-stone. It is shown that Damon is back to his Civil War days, injured and scared. When Nora learns that all this time Bonnie was simply stalling her from saving Mary Louise, she siphons out Bonnie's magic and stakes Stefan with the Phoenix Sword as well. Flashforward: Three years from now in Chicago, Stefan is with Valerie. He has burnt down his Porsche, so he borrows her car to go to Dallas where Damon has been kidnapped. Valerie promises that if something happens to him, she will rain hell down on anyone responsible and they part with a kiss.
143	10	"Hell Is Other People"	Deborah Chow	Holly Brix & Neil Reynolds	January 29, 2016	3J5710	1.23
Three months later, Damon's hell: Amidst Civil War, Damon receives a sad letter from Stefan asking him to return. According to higher orders, in order to take leave, he has to arrest union sympathizers. So he and his friend Henry leave for the mission but end up massacring the host family. As Damon searches the basement, Lily shows up and he realizes it is all fake. Next, Bonnie brings back Damon who wakes up only to realize that Stefan, too, is stuck in hell-world and Julian's held his body hostage. He rushes to a miffed Julian who scorches Stefan's body. Lily shows up again. Damon quickly realizes all this is still hell. He keeps shuttling between the war day and real life, in hell, on a loop unable to save the deserters. Eventually, under the influence of Stefan, Damon realizes that his messed up life basically roots down to him escaping guilt after having missed his mother when he needed her the most. Finally, Damon returns to the very first vision of hell he had and finds Lily in excruciating pain. Overwhelmed by emotions, Damon starts sobbing and saying that he missed her and how angry he was at himself for not bidding her goodbye the way she deserved in the last two chances. He begs her to give him one last chance to serve her and receive her love but death intervenes. Lily dies in his arms and Damon is left devastated. This time he actually escapes hell, unable to believe that he lost his mother again and begs Bonnie to send him back. As Stefan tries explaining to him that all of it was hell faux, he loses it completely and goes on an attacking spree over Stefan, Caroline, Matt and Bonnie. As the episode ends, Damon is mentally and emotionally drained as he staggers to stand still, looking around and realizing that this time it was real.
144	11	"Things We Lost in the Fire"	Paul Wesley	Melinda Hsu Taylor	February 5, 2016	3J5711	1.09
Damon saves Matt and Bonnie as Caroline stealthily injects him with vervain. Stefan is having disturbing post-hell hallucinations of him and Damon underwater with the latter drowning. In his hallucinations, Damon even posed a threat to his and Caroline's relationship. (Damon kept Stefan from escaping hell-world, so in order to escape, the latter had to let go of him). Soon, Henry's spirit starts haunting Damon. Tyler shows up for Caroline's baby shower. Under Julian's leadership, Mystic Falls is now a shoddy home to his vampire mates. It is revealed that Alaric will move to Dallas and Caroline finds it hard to accept that she has to eventually part with the twins. Matt is arrested by a cop named Penny for DUI who later questions his wooden weapons. Nora and Bonnie anxiously plan to face a ruthless legendary vampire huntress (she hunts down any Phoenix sword-staked vampire) after Nora receives an X-marked envelope warning of her arrival. Damon meets up with an apprehensive Tyler forcing him to take him to see Elena. As Damon opens Elena's coffin, he finds Henry. He charges at a prepared Tyler but eventually bashes him against concrete. Henry here advises Damon to attain liberation by letting go of what holds back his true monstrous nature. An exasperated Damon attempts to finish off Henry by setting the coffin on fire. As he watches it burn, Henry reappears telling him that he burnt Elena for good which leaves him devastated. Back home, Stefan assures Damon that he will always have his back who is at a loss of words, unable to reveal that his reason to breathe and live is no more as he killed Elena. Flashforward: Dallas news station: Matt has become rough. He frees Caroline who was kidnapped and asks her to get out and stay out of sight until the huntress gets what she wants. Caroline is shocked at Matt's change in behavior and the fact that he is in cahoots with The Huntress.
145	12	"Postcards from the Edge"	Pascal Verschooris	Rebecca Sonnenshine	February 12, 2016	3J5712	1.05
Back in Whitmore, Caroline's supernatural pregnancy is affecting her as the babies are siphoners, siphoning away her vampirism magic causing her to desiccate. Valerie tries swapping their magic source for a magic-filled talisman but it is in vain. Officer Penny learns about Mystic Falls brimming with vampires from Matt. Bonnie, Mary Lou and Nora search for Rayna Cruz, "The Huntress" finding her old and feeble in a psychiatric ward. Puzzled, the Heretics carry on their search whist Rayna attacks Bonnie who is saved by Enzo. It is revealed that Enzo sent the 'X' cards to track Rayna; he burns her to ashes only to revive her back in her young true self. Elsewhere, Damon returns to his road-kill antics, picks on Julian and indulges in dangerous games with his mates. The fights esculate with Julian stepping up to fight him. Stefen arrives and begs Damon to stop but Damon continues to fight. Damon begs Julian for death. Stefan interferes and finally gets Damon to step out of the ring. Eventually, Damon discloses that he burned Elena alive. Stefan punches him, and returns to his car. He is now hell bent on killing Julian. Damon looks on bleeding and remorseful. Back in Mystic Falls, Valerie and Stefan finally take on Julian as Stefan catches him off guard and stakes him while Valerie keeps them cloaked. Back in the Salvatore boarding house, Damon gets an unexpected visitor, a brunette (she saved him during one of the ring fights) who kisses him. Wallowing in emptiness, Damon gazes into her eyes accepting the bitter truth of fate and as a final jolt of mental agony, he bends down to kiss her back. Flashforward: Three years from now, near the Dallas news station, Matt vervains Stefan after freeing Caroline (as shown in the previous episode). Inside the news station, the unseen vampire hunter is finally revealed to be a young Rayna, who looks on at Damon as he sits there tied to a chair weakened by werewolf toxin.
146	13	"This Woman's Work"	Garreth Stover	Chad Fiveash & James Stoteraux	February 19, 2016	3J5713	1.01
Rayna is a supernaturally blessed vampire huntress who was once compelled by Julian to kill her own father, a hunter belonging to one among The Five, using the Phoenix sword as her weapon. Back in 1903, hell bent on seeking revenge, she impaled Beau and staked Julian into the Phoenix hell-stone. She has now released herself and retrieved her sword from Bonnie and Damon. Caroline's fast desiccation calls for an early C section delivery which is aided by the Heretics and later Bonnie. Suddenly, Beau's wound reopens and he is killed and burnt by Rayna. Nora and Mary Louise run for their lives. Meanwhile, Valerie and Stefan try easing the delivery (the twins were reluctant to come out thus leave their constant source of magic). Bonnie, Alaric and Valerie watch as Caroline successfully gives birth to the twins. Damon distracted and attempting to fight Rayna id almost staked, but Stefan comes to rescue. Stefan is marked by the sword forcing him to run from her. Enzo informs Damon that Elena is alive and protected by his men and that her death was a hallucination. Relieved, Damon promises Stefan that he will make things right now that life has offered him a second chance. Alaric names the twins Josie in honor of their mom, and Elizabeth, in honor of Caroline's mom. Flashforward: Caroline and the twins who call her mummy are driving away to New Orleans. She needs to meet a friend.
147	14	"Moonlight on the Bayou"	Jeffrey Hunt	Caroline Dries & Brett Matthews	February 26, 2016	3J5714	1.12
Caroline moves to Dallas with Alaric and the twins. Valerie locates an anti-magic bar in New Orleans, "St. James Infirmary" where Stefan must hide (as Rayna's sword will not be able to trace him there). At the bar, Stefan meets Klaus. He eventually finds out that Stefan is there hiding from Rayna and is furious. He asks Stefan to leave, and Stefan forgets his phone. Klaus gets to talk with Caroline, finally agreeing to protect Stefan and does so. While on the run, both Nora and Mary Louise are tranquilized and captured by men who work for "The Armory". Meanwhile, Bonnie and Damon meet Enzo at a supernatural museum-like organization named "The Armory", who are desperate to lock up Rayna. Enzo works for them as they are giving him information about his family. He wants to know Stefan's location in order to lure Rayna in. Damon adamantly keeps his brother's location a secret after getting warned about the organization's dubious past from Valerie. An equally adamant Enzo tranquilizes Damon and knocks out Bonnie (it is shown that, somehow, Enzo makes Bonnie immune to magic). Damon finds himself locked in with a comatose Tyler who will soon transition into a werewolf because it is a full moon. Bonnie takes desperate measures to save Damon from being bitten. Damon struggles with Tyler, who makes him realize that "people around him are always dying in order to save him and it must stop". Taking it to heart, Damon advises Bonnie to not open the cell as she could die. Undeterred, Bonnie manages to open the cell, only to get her skull bashed by Tyler who runs away after a fight. Damon sees that she is not healing with his blood and gets her hospitalized. As he talks to an unconscious Bonnie, he says that he is deeply hurt to have put her and Stefan's lives in danger, both of whom tried to save him. This makes him think that it would be best to take himself out of the equation as to no longer bother his loved ones, and it will all end tomorrow. This episode begins a crossover with The Originals that concludes on "A Streetcar Named Desire". Flashforward: Caroline and the twins have come to meet Klaus at the same bar that Stefan was hiding. A waitress informs her that it has been three years since Klaus has disappeared.
148	15	"I Would for You"	Mike Karasick	Brian Young	March 4, 2016	3J5715	1.06
Stefan and Valerie pursue a herb that can hide them from Rayna. With help from Matt, Damon finally captures Rayna and kills her multiple times in order to die permanently. Bonnie and Enzo discover that once Rayna's lives are over, all of those she marked will die as well and inform Damon just in time before she dies permanently. Damon escapes and notifies Stefan of his intention to desiccate for the next 60 years, to Stefan's disapproval. After an advice from Penny, Matt confronts Stefan and tells him and all vampires to get away from Mystic Falls, otherwise he will show the world the existence of vampires on a CCTV footage. Damon arrives at the storage unit where he plans to desiccate alongside Elena's coffin, but Bonnie shows up letting him know that she is extremely hurt with his decision. She leaves him there and Damon finally lies down to slowly desiccate near to death with hopes that he has saved his loved ones from the array of bad choices he makes putting their lives in jeopardy. Flashforward: Stefan is captured by Rayna who tells him that there is a Plan B and that she does not want to kill him. His mark can be transferred to someone else who deserves it. She mentions Damon, but Stefan says she is trying to get them apart and rejects, but Damon comes in and says it was his idea.
149	16	"Days of Future Past"	Ian Somerhalder	Melinda Hsu Taylor	April 1, 2016	3J5716	1.07
Three years have passed and The Armory is searching for Enzo and Rayna as they believe the former released the huntress, but actually Matt had freed her to get Stefan back into the Phoenix hell stone as the vampire had something to do with his girlfriend's (Penny) death. Alex has kept Nora and Mary Lou as hostages for these three years experimenting on the latter with Rayna's blood (it is lethal to witches) and eventually sending Nora to find Enzo in return of Mary Lou. Rayna and a werewolf toxin-saturated Damon coax Stefan to do the mark transfer who eventually sets off on a run from Rayna. Damon is struggling with the werewolf toxin in his system and contemplating on whether he should participate for the mark transfer (as he will die when Rayna does naturally in another 60-70 years ergo, bidding goodbye to his chance of seeing Elena ever again) or come up with a better plan. In the meanwhile, Valerie comes to his rescue; over the past three years - her and Stefan's friendship has seen evolution and while globe-trotting, they have managed to contact an individual who may know ways to end Rayna. Nora finds Enzo and they decide to collectively fight Alex who they eventually corner. Alex is curious as to why Enzo is so desperate to stash all the lethal-to-a-witch pills and reveals that there is no antidote and Mary Lou is as good as dead. Valerie and Damon are running against time to capture Rayna and save Stefan but it gets too late as the huntress gains over them - Damon finally agrees to do the mark transfer but before they are done, Rayna has already stabbed and sent Stefan back into the hell stone leaving Valerie and Damon devastated. Nora and Mary Lou share their final moments and in a run-in with Rayna, Nora gets marked and the sword gets stuck to their car. Both Nora and Mary Lou finally decide to be together in death as they do their last magic to break and destroy the Phoenix stone forever along with blowing their car off to pieces. Rayna who was chasing them all along stands there devastated and stunned as she watches her stone, her mark (Nora) and probably her sword get destroyed this time, for real.
150	17	"I Went to the Woods"	Julie Plec	Story by : Julie Plec & Neil Reynolds; Teleplay by : Neil Reynolds	April 8, 2016	3J5717	1.03
Destroying the Phoenix stone led to the escape of all the trapped souls followed by rampant possession of dead bodies. Stefan's body gets possessed by a remorseless vampire who goes to Memphis sorority parties to quench his bloodthirst. Stefan's soul gets into Marty, an alcoholic mariner who was in the middle of a road mishap. He/Stefan struggles to stay alive as an ongoing blizzard starts taking a toll on him. Damon, Alaric and Valerie team up to catch hold of both Stefan's body and soul before the latter's host body succumbs to cold and detox. Valerie, with the help of Rayna, gets to know about Marty's whereabouts and informs Damon who goes on the search of him and manages to contact him via cellphone. He keeps Marty/Stefan engaged and moving while Stefan reminisces about their childhood and opens up about how he felt about Damon selfishly bailing on him time and again over the years. Eventually Damon catches up on Marty just in time who falls down unconscious. He makes him sit inside the warmer car and gives him doughnuts to keep his younger brother fed and going. However hypothermia starts pacing up on Marty and now, they are rushing against time to go catch Stefan's body, which is busy feeding off University sororities in Memphis.
151	18	"One Way or Another"	Rashaad Ernesto Green	Story by : Penny Cox; Teleplay by : Rebecca Sonnenshine	April 15, 2016	3J5718	1.02
Damon arranges an ambulance as Marty Hammond's state worsens. Alaric and Damon track down Ambrose - the vampire who has taken residence in Stefan's body. After both Marty Hammond and Stefan's body are arranged, Valerie does the transfer spell during which she realizes that Stefan was meant to be with Caroline and she should not be in their way. After fixing Stefan, she lets go of him on good terms and parts ways to explore the world. Damon apologizes for his selfish desiccation decision and begs Alaric to get back to being friends who blankly refuses stating that he has been better and safer without being disturbed by Damon and he does not want things to go back to the way they were. Cut-to Bonnie in a psychiatric ward in Asheville, where she has been taking the pills for over three years, to stay off The Armory's radar; she learns that they needed her to open some basement vault once sealed shut by a Bennett witch. Enzo gives her a visit and lets her know that these pills would eventually kill her so she should stop taking them. Just as they hug, Bonnie sees Damon standing outside her room holding flowers. He has come to apologize to her but cannot bring up anything to say. A tear falls from Bonnie’s face before she slams the door shut.
152	19	"Somebody That I Used to Know"	Chris Grismer	Story by : Matthew D'Ambrosio; Teleplay by : Holly Brix	April 22, 2016	3J5719	1.02
Bonnie's condition worsens as her first scab appears. Damon and Enzo work out a deal with Rayna in which if they kill all the enlisted vampires in her murder list, Rayna will allow them to utilize her last Everlasting's life and help out Bonnie. Over the last 3 years, Bonnie and Enzo have become a couple. Bonnie has not yet forgiven Damon; he does most of the dirty work but remains an uninvited guest to Bonnie and Enzo. Stefan goes to Dallas trying to make amends for how he left things with Caroline but neither her nor Alaric are interested in bridging back their old friendship with Stefan. Just as Damon and Enzo are close to sealing the end of their deal, Rayna adds hundreds of more names to the list leaving an impossible task ahead of them as they only have a week to kill them all before Bonnie succumbs to the effects of those poisonous pills.
153	20	"Kill 'Em All"	Kellie Cyrus	Chad Fiveash & James Stoteraux	April 29, 2016	3J5720	1.05
Damon makes a deal with Alexandria wherein he will deliver them Bonnie for opening the vault provided they send some workforce to help him track down the long list of vampires. Matt realizes that 2 years back, he killed Penny while she was capturing Stefan, who came to Mystic Falls to pay respect to Liz Forbes - a thought that had been compelled away by Stefan under a false cover story of the car accident as Matt would get shattered as he and Penny had just gotten engaged. However, Matt still holds grudge against Stefan for having destroyed his, Penny's and hundreds of others' lives. Damon-Enzo, Matt-Stefan, Caroline-Alaric, and the men from Armory team up separately to finish off Rayna's list. Pills' effects start wearing off of Bonnie enabling her to practice magic again. She opens the vault and Alex finds Yvette's body in an unrecognizable state though hearing her voices. As Alex and the others search inside the vault, Bonnie traps them inside the building thus keeping her promise she made to Virginia. Finally, Rayna's last life gets transferred to Bonnie, but along with that gets transferred her hunter instincts, turning Bonnie, a girl whose entire life revolves around her near and dear ones who unfortunately are vampires, into a vampire huntress.
154	21	"Requiem for a Dream"	Paul Wesley	Brett Matthews & Neil Reynolds	May 6, 2016	3J5721	0.90
Bonnie is not waking up to prevent herself from killing her vampire friends. Caroline and Enzo individually enter her head and try convincing her to let go of the murdering urge and to embrace this new chance at living. Each of them fail as Bonnie kills them in the dreams, thus marking them in a way. Stefan vervains Caroline to keep her out of harm's way; both have a heart-to-heart talk clearing away 3 years' worth of misunderstanding. Damon tries reverse psychology on Bonnie by getting in her head and urging her to better die so he gets his Elena back. Enraged and hurt, Bonnie rips out his heart, marking him. But this try by Damon doesn't go in vain, as Bonnie does wake up. She gives a heads up to Caroline who is heartbroken as she realizes that she'll have to abandon her daughters to be on a never-ending run with Stefan. Matt convinces Bonnie to try to remain rooted to her human side and she agrees, but in one condition: she needs to finish off Damon once and for all. Bonnie and Damon have a major clash at the woods where she beats Damon more brutally than ever; yet he doesn't give up and draws her towards the very tree stump where Bonnie was once remembered after she had died. He tries calming her down by making her realize that she's powerful, she's handled more supernatural forms than he can remember, that he admires and cares for her and that may she forgive him for what he has done to their once strong friendship. Undeterred, Bonnie takes a final jolt at Damon but just in time, Matt tranquilizes her. Damon and Matt tuck her in to safety in Matt's car hoping that she'd be out for 8 hours or so. Somewhere in midway, Bonnie wakes up, chains up Matt, shoving him in the backseat of the car and takes control of the wheels and drives back to finish her unfinished business. Damon and Enzo find ways to save Bonnie as Matt had earlier, known from the Shaman that: if the link between Bonnie and the Last Everlasting can be severed in any way, the curse will probably sever too. With all paths in front of them, there are just a few major roadblocks: The Armory's magically sealed shut, wherein the evil from the vault could be wandering anywhere and someone has to go get inside the Armory to get The Everlasting's body out.
155	22	"Gods and Monsters"	Michael A. Allowitz	Brian Young	May 13, 2016	3J5722	1.04
Enzo, Damon, Stefan and Caroline try coming up with plans to open The Armory while Matt and Bonnie are chasing after them. While doing so, they meet an accident that injures Matt badly. Alaric and Caroline decide on making the twins open up the Armory by siphoning off Bonnie's spell. Penny's spirit makes Matt realize that he deserves better, making him regain his consciousness. The twins open the Armory. Damon and Stefan go inside. Enzo lures Bonnie to the cabin letting Damon and Stefan buy more time. The tiny cabin gets nasty as Bonnie, unable to hold her urges, holds a stake down Enzo's chest. While searching, Damon and Stefan finally approach the vault which Damon decides to venture in, alone. He assures Stefan that in some way or another, everything will be okay. They share a handshake and hug and part ways as Damon finally gets inside the vault. Enzo recollects of the glorious 3 years as he struggles to the impale while Damon, just in time, finds the Everlasting's body, sets it on fire thus severing the link and lifting the curse off of Bonnie. Outside, Alaric tells Caroline to stay back with Stefan and parts ways on good terms saying that no matter what, they will always be family. Stefan and Caroline get back together. A rejoiced Bonnie forgives Damon on the phone and while he's getting out, he starts hearing Elena's voice. Enzo and Bonnie warn Damon that it is the vault playing tricks with his mind but he keeps following the voice and something scary overpowers him. Enzo rushes in to help encounter the damaged Damon. The monster takes Enzo as well. Flashforward: Three months from now, Everybody's trying to find Enzo and Damon, Alaric manages to crack open the code for the vault but they find it empty. Bonnie remains helpless as she lost two of her closest people and her magic never came back. Gradually, the rest start getting reports of large number of people going missing and they realize it's them, but they don't know where to start looking. Somewhere far off, Damon and Enzo have lost every shred of humanity and killing endless people for the sake of sport. Stefan is shown writing his journal to Elena promising that he'll get them back and whatever Damon does in all this time, it's not his fault.

== Casting ==
The cast features Paul Wesley as Stefan Salvatore, Ian Somerhalder as Damon Salvatore, Kat Graham as Bonnie Bennett, Candice Accola as Caroline Forbes and Zach Roerig as Matt Donovan.

On April 6, 2015, it was announced that Nina Dobrev would be leaving after the sixth season and that Michael Trevino would only appear as a guest on the new season. On April 11, 2015, it was announced that Steven R. McQueen would be departing the show.

On July 15, 2015, it was announced that Scarlett Byrne and Teressa Liane were hired to play Nora and Mary Louise, respectively. Nora and Mary Louise are described as extremely powerful and protective with each other, because it is the first same-sex couple in the series; additionally it is reported that Elizabeth Blackmore was chosen to give life to Valerie. The trio is part of the family of heretics adopted by Lily Salvatore. On November 5, it was announced that Leslie-Anne Huff was hired to play Rayna, a vampire huntress.

== Reception ==
=== Critical response ===
Based on 13 reviews, the 7th season currently holds a 77% on Rotten Tomatoes with an average rating of 7.75 out of 10. The site's critics consensus reads, "Despite an Elena-less season, Vampire Diaries still has plenty of fleshed out plot and new characters for fans to sink their teeth into."

=== Ratings ===
Viewership and ratings per episode of The Vampire Diaries season 7
No.	Title	Air date	Rating/share (18–49)	Viewers (millions)	DVR (18–49)	DVR viewers (millions)	Total (18–49)	Total viewers (millions)
1	"Day One of Twenty-Two Thousand, Give or Take"	October 8, 2015	0.6/2	1.38	0.5	0.92	1.1	2.30
2	"Never Let Me Go"	October 15, 2015	0.6/2	1.40	0.5	0.90	1.1	2.30
3	"Age of Innocence"	October 22, 2015	0.5/2	1.20	0.5	0.86	1.0	2.06
4	"I Carry Your Heart with Me"	October 29, 2015	0.6/2	1.24	0.6	1.11	1.2	2.34
5	"Live Through This"	November 5, 2015	0.6/2	1.34	0.5	0.98	1.1	2.31
6	"Best Served Cold"	November 12, 2015	0.6/2	1.32	0.6	0.99	1.2	2.31
7	"Mommie Dearest"	November 12, 2015	0.5/1	1.10	0.5	0.89	1.0	2.00
8	"Hold Me, Thrill Me, Kiss Me, Kill Me"	December 3, 2015	0.5/2	1.31	0.6	0.87	1.1	2.18
9	"Cold as Ice"	December 10, 2015	0.5/2	1.18	0.5	0.89	1.0	2.07
10	"Hell Is Other People"	January 29, 2016	0.5/2	1.23	0.4	0.81	0.9	2.04
11	"Things We Lost in the Fire"	February 5, 2016	0.4/1	1.09	0.5	0.77	0.9	1.86
12	"Postcards from the Edge"	February 12, 2016	0.4/1	1.05	0.4	0.78	0.8	1.82
13	"This Woman's Work"	February 19, 2016	0.4/1	1.01	0.4	0.71	0.8	1.72
14	"Moonlight on the Bayou"	February 26, 2016	0.5/2	1.12	0.4	0.75	0.9	1.88
15	"I Would for You"	March 4, 2016	0.4/1	1.06	0.4	0.73	0.8	1.79
16	"Days of Future Past"	April 1, 2016	0.4/2	1.07	0.4	0.66	0.8	1.74
17	"I Went to the Woods"	April 8, 2016	0.3/1	1.03	0.3	0.69	0.7	1.73
18	"One Way or Another"	April 15, 2016	0.4/1	1.02	0.4	0.64	0.8	1.67
19	"Somebody That I Used to Know"	April 22, 2016	0.4/2	1.02	0.3	0.69	0.7	1.70
20	"Kill 'Em All"	April 29, 2016	0.4/1	1.05	0.4	0.67	0.8	1.71
21	"Requiem for a Dream"	May 6, 2016	0.3/1	0.90	0.5	0.76	0.8	1.67
22	"Gods and Monsters"	May 13, 2016	0.4/1	1.04	0.4	0.75	0.8	1.79
