= Landline (film) =

- Theatrical release poster
- Directed by: Gillian Robespierre
- Screenplay by: Elisabeth Holm; Gillian Robespierre
- Story by: Elisabeth Holm; Gillian Robespierre; Tom Bean
- Produced by: Elisabeth Holm; Russell Levine; Gigi Pritzker
- Starring: Jenny Slate; Edie Falco; Abby Quinn; John Turturro; Jay Duplass; Finn Wittrock
- Cinematography: Chris Teague
- Edited by: Casey Brooks
- Music by: Chris Bordeaux; Clyde Lawrence; Jordan Cohen
- Production companies: Odd Lot Entertainment; Route One Entertainment
- Distributed by: Amazon Studios; Magnolia Pictures
- Release dates: January 20, 2017 (Sundance); July 21, 2017 (United States)
- Running time: 93 minutes
- Country: United States
- Language: English
- Budget: $3.7 million
- Box office: $940,854

Landline is a 2017 American comedy film directed by Gillian Robespierre with a screenplay by Robespierre and Elisabeth Holm from a story by Robespierre, Holm and Tom Bean. The film stars Jenny Slate, Edie Falco, Abby Quinn, John Turturro, Jay Duplass and Finn Wittrock, and follows sisters in 1990s New York City who think their father is having an affair.

It had its world premiere at the 2017 Sundance Film Festival on January 20, 2017, and was released by Amazon Studios on July 21, 2017.

== Plot ==
In 1995, the Jacobs family is a tight-knit Italian-Jewish family. Parents Pat and Alan have a marriage that seems to be struggling because of Pat's disinterest in her husband. Elder daughter Dana is in a long-term relationship with her fiancé Ben that has hit a rut. Younger child Ali is still in high school and more interested in going to raves and getting high than applying to colleges.

Returning from a rave one night and trying to do her homework Ali unlocks a file containing her father's love-notes to a mysterious woman named "C".

Around the same time Dana runs into an ex, Nate, at a party. Sometime later she decides to blow off her social obligations and take a day to herself. She runs into Nate and the two have sex.

After being confronted by her parents over her behavior Ali runs away to their family's country home to have sex with her boyfriend. She is confronted by Dana who has gone there to get away from Ben. The two end up having a girls' weekend where Ali tells Dana about their father's affairs and Dana tells Ali that she cheated on Ben.

Dana decides to move back home to "support" Ali and help her find C however she continues her affair with Nate and acts irresponsibly, blowing off her obligations. The sisters hit a dead end, but at a staged reading of their father's play they meet Carla, an actress, and believe she is the C of the letters. Dana is upset but when she mentions it to Nate he blows her off laughing that monogamy doesn't exist and causing her to end the affair. After a conversation with her father where she tells him she's not sure about the direction of her life, Dana begins to reach out to Ben once more.

On Halloween Dana goes to meet up with Ben but reveals to him she cheated with Nate causing him to leave her. Ali then takes Dana to a drug deal where Dana convinces her not to buy the drugs, but the two get picked up by the police anyway. That same night Pat goes out to a bar and flirts with a man but returns home and has sex with Alan. She then reveals that she knows about Alan's affair with Carla. Pat and Alan's fight is interrupted by a phone call from jail where Alan goes to pick up his daughters. Returning home, the sisters find Pat smoking and crying. She reveals the affair to them and the two of them hug her in comfort.

Dana pursues Ben and convinces him to take her back. Alan moves out of the family home but vows to stay a part of the family. At Ali's birthday party the family reunite to celebrate.

== Cast ==
- Jenny Slate as Dana Jacobs, Alan and Pat's older daughter and Ali's older sister
- Edie Falco as Pat Jacobs, Alan's wife and Dana and Ali's mother
- Abby Quinn as Ali Jacobs, Dana's younger sister and Alan and Pat's younger daughter
- John Turturro as Alan Jacobs, Pat's husband and Dana and Ali's father
- Jay Duplass as Ben, Dana's fiancé
- Finn Wittrock as Nate, an ex-lover of Dana
- Jordan Carlos as Ravi
- Ali Ahn as Sandra

== Production ==
On May 15, 2016, it was reported that Jenny Slate would star in Landline, reuniting with Obvious Child director Gillian Robespierre and producer Elisabeth Holm, alongside Edie Falco, John Turturro, Jay Duplass, and newcomer Abby Quinn. On May 19, 2016, Finn Wittrock joined the cast. On June 9, 2016, Landline began filming in New York City.

== Release ==
The film had its world premiere at the 2017 Sundance Film Festival on January 20, 2017. Shortly after, Amazon Studios acquired distribution rights to the film. Magnolia Pictures co-distributed the film with Amazon. It was released on July 21, 2017.

== Reception ==
On Rotten Tomatoes the film has an approval rating of 75% based on 126 reviews, and an average rating of 6.49/10. The website's critical consensus reads, "Landline's talented cast — and a fast-paced approach from director/co-writer Gillian Robespierre — help this charming multi-generational dramedy overcome a familiar storyline." On Metacritic, the film has an average weighted score of 66 out of 100, based on 33 critics, indicating "generally favorable" reviews.
