= Elisabeth Holm =

American film producer and screenwriter

- Born: December 3, 1986 (age 39)
- Occupations: screenwriter, producer
- Known for: Obvious Child

Elisabeth Holm is an Academy Award-nominated and Sundance Award-winning film producer and screenwriter.

== Career ==
Holm produced and co-wrote the story for Marcel the Shell with Shoes On, which premiered at the Telluride Film Festival and was acquired by A24. Hailed by the National Board of Review and New York Film Critics' Circle as The Best Animated Film of the Year, the film and Holm garnered Academy Award, Golden Globe, BAFTA, and Producers Guild of America Award nominations and won Annie Awards for Best Indie Feature, Best Writing, and Best Voice Acting for its co-creator and star Jenny Slate.

Holm co-wrote and produced the independent romantic comedy Obvious Child, directed by Gillian Robespierre and starring Slate. Holm received the Sundance Film Festival Producer's Award for her work on the film, which was acquired by A24 and ranked as one of the National Board of Review's Top Independent Films of the Year.

Holm also co-wrote and produced Robespierre's follow up feature Landline, which premiered at the 2017 Sundance Film Festival and starred Slate, Edie Falco, and John Turturro.

Holm wrote and executive produced a television pilot for Annapurna and Amazon Studios starring Sarah Michelle Gellar, and Holm and Robespierre co-wrote and executive produced a pilot for A24 and FX starring Jenny Slate and Ari Graynor.

Holm was the associate producer of the Emmy and Academy Award-nominated Paradise Lost 3: Purgatory, the third film in an HBO documentary series about the West Memphis Three by Joe Berlinger and Bruce Sinofsky. She also produced the Slamdance Grand Jury and FIPRESCI Prize-winning Welcome to Pine Hill, directed by Keith Miller and released by Oscilloscope Laboratories.

Holm was recognized by Forbes as one of "30 Under 30" and is a Sundance Women's Initiative Fellow.

== Personal life ==
Holm was born and raised in New York City.

== Filmography ==
Year	Title	Role		Notes
Year	Title	Producer	Writer	Notes
2011	Paradise Lost 3: Purgatory	Associate	No	
2012	Welcome to Pine Hill	Yes	No	
2014	Obvious Child	Yes	Story	
2015	Sailing a Sinking Sea	Yes	No	
2017	Landline	Yes	Co-wrote	
2021	Marcel the Shell with Shoes On	Yes	Story	Nominated – Academy Award for Best Animated Feature
