= Gillian Robespierre =

American director and writer (born 1978)

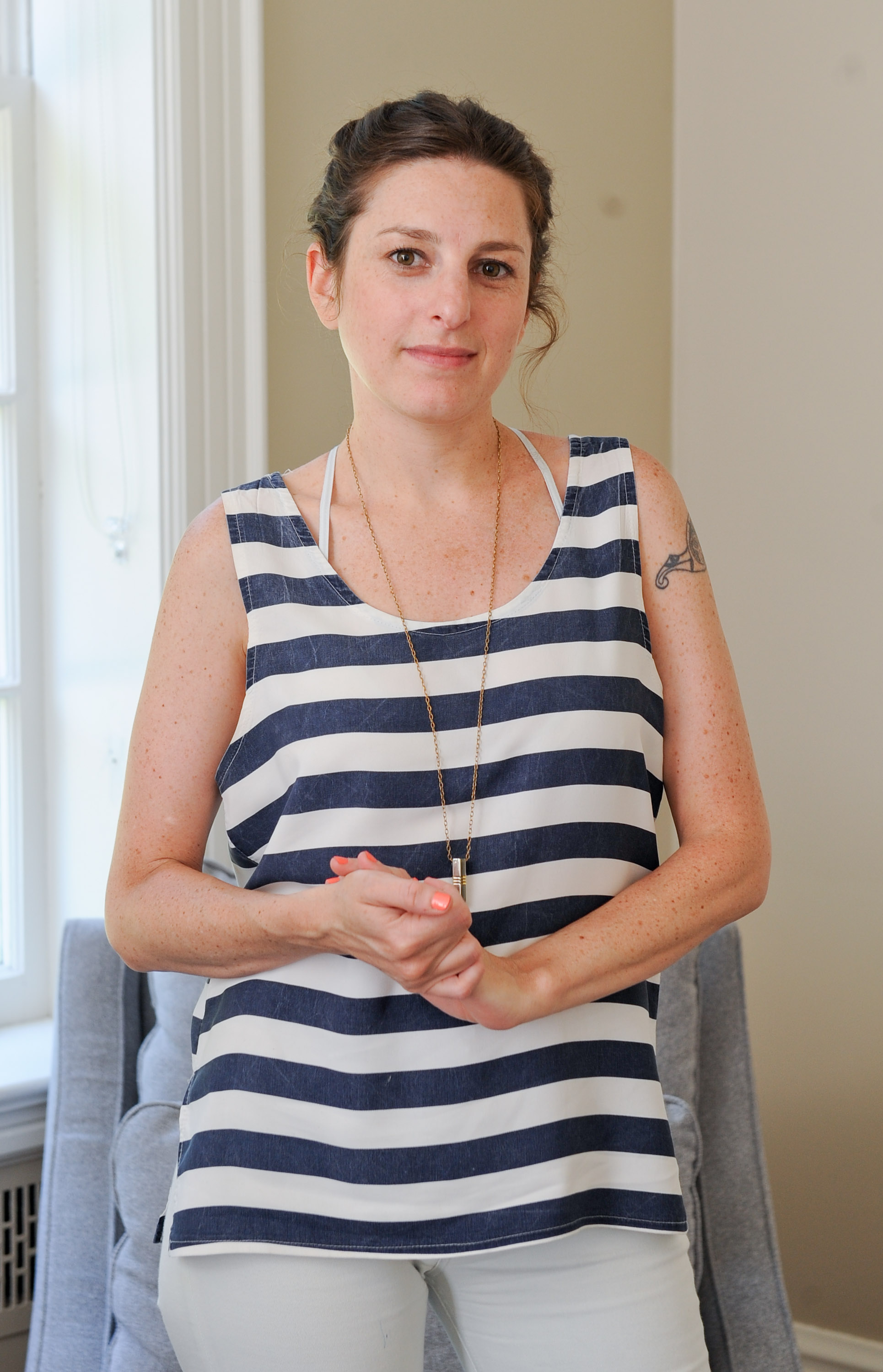
- Robespierre in 2014
- Born: June 29, 1978 (age 48); Brooklyn, New York City, New York, U.S.
- Education: School of Visual Arts (BA)
- Occupations: Filmmaker, writer, director, producer, actress
- Known for: Obvious Child
- Children: 1

Gillian Robespierre (born June 29, 1978) is an American director and writer, known for writing and directing the films Obvious Child and Landline.

== Early life ==
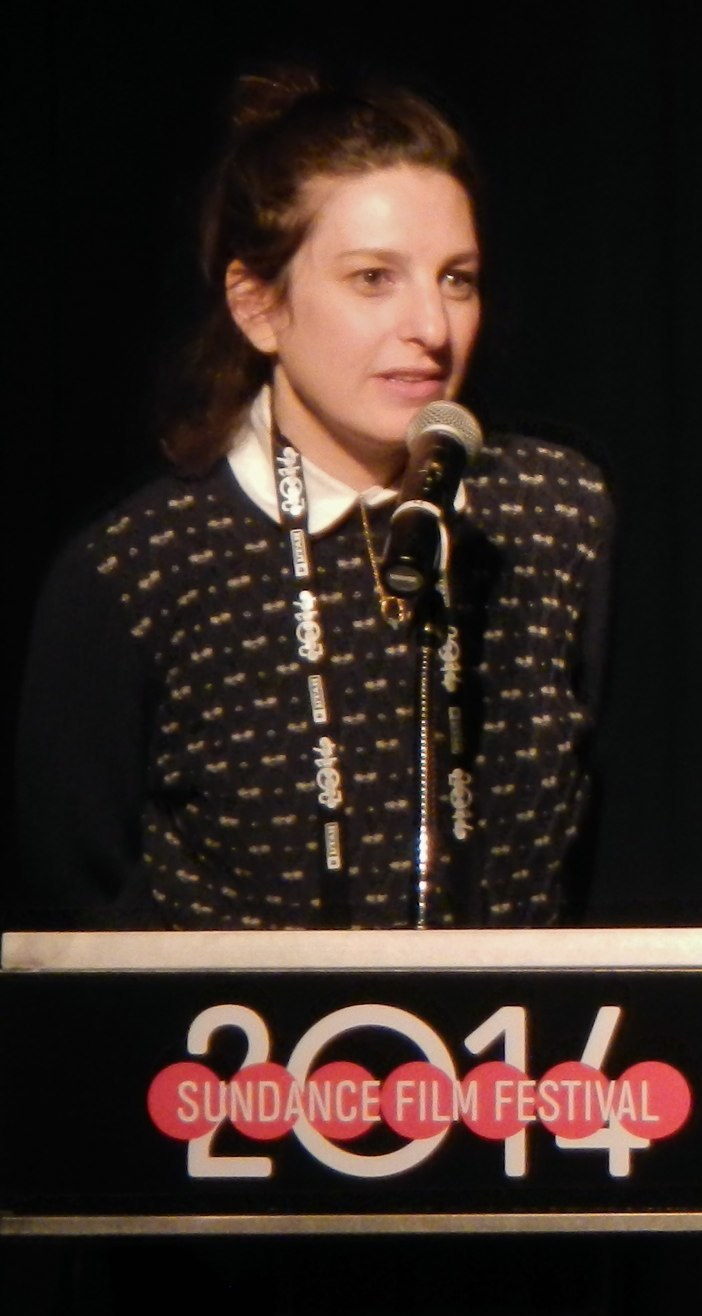
Gillian Robespierre, 2014

Robespierre was born to a Jewish family and raised in New York City. In 2005 she graduated from the School of Visual Arts, where she majored in Film and Video.

== Career ==
Robespierre began her career working as a production assistant on big budget features like American Gangster. She also worked for the Directors Guild of America until 2014.

In 2009, Robespierre co-wrote (with Anna Bean and Karen Maine) and directed the short film Obvious Child, about a young woman who is impregnated after a one-night stand and decides to have an abortion. Robespierre approached Jenny Slate to star in the lead role after seeing her perform at a comedy club. Robespierre later expanded the short into her 2014 feature film debut Obvious Child with Slate once again playing the lead role. The film premiered at the 2014 Sundance Film Festival where it was acquired by A24 Films.

In early 2015, Robespierre announced she was developing a comedy pilot for FX with Elisabeth Holm, who co-wrote Obvious Child, starring Jenny Slate and Ari Graynor. Robespierre's second film, Landline, premiered at the Sundance Film Festival on January 20, 2017, followed by a theatrical release on July 21, 2017. The film stars Jenny Slate, Abby Quinn, Edie Falco, John Turturro, and Jay Duplass.

It was announced in January 2021 that Robespierre would direct an adaptation of Melissa Broder's novel The Pisces, about a woman and her "erotic infatuation with a merman". The film will star Claire Foy.

== Filmography ==
Film
Year	Title	Credit	Notes
2009	Obvious Child	Writer, director, producer	(Short)
2014	Obvious Child	Writer, director, producer	
2017	Landline	Writer, director	
TBA	The Pisces	Writer, director	

=== As director ===
Television

- Casual (4 episodes) (2017–18)
- Crashing (6 episodes) (2018–19)
- Silicon Valley (1 episode) (2018)
- Jenny Slate: Stage Fright (2019)
- Shrill (1 episode) (2019)
- Mrs. Fletcher (2 episodes) (2019)
- A Teacher (2 episodes) (2020)
- Only Murders in the Building (2 episodes) (2021)
- And Just Like That... (2 episodes) (2021)
- Everything's Trash (1 episode) (2022)
- Goosebumps (2 episodes) (2025)
- Every Year After (2026); (1 episode) (also executive producer)
- Not Suitable for Work (2 episodes) (2026)
- The Answers (1 episode) (TBA); also executive producer
