= Dead Souls (2012 film) =

American film

- Directed by: Colin Theys
- Screenplay by: John Doolan
- Based on: Dead Souls by Michael Laimo
- Edited by: Adrian Correia
- Music by: Jonathan Bartz; Matthew Llewellyn
- Distributed by: Chiller
- Release date: October 12, 2012
- Country: United States
- Language: English

Dead Souls is a 2012 film directed by Colin Theys, based on the novel of the same name by Michael Laimo.

== Synopsis ==
On his 18th birthday Johnny is surprised to discover that he was adopted, and that he has inherited his birth family's farm in Maine. He decides to accept this inheritance and travels to the farm, where he finds that the house has been abandoned and that a squatter named Emma has been living there. Johnny also learns that his entire birth family was killed in the house and that it contains secrets that put his very life in danger.

== Cast ==
- Jesse James as Johnny Petrie
- Magda Apanowicz as Emma
- Bill Moseley as Sheriff Depford
- Geraldine Hughes as Mary Petrie
- Noah Fleiss as Mack
- Jaiden Kaine as Andrew Judson
- J.H. Torrance Downes as Benjamin Conroy
- Elizabeth Irene as Faith Conroy
- Kyle Donnery as Daniel Conroy
- Bridget Megan Clark as Elizabeth Conroy

== Production ==
Michael Laimo first published his book Dead Souls in 2007 through Leisure Books. The novel was optioned for film and John Doolan was brought on to adapt the novel into a screenplay. Colin Theys was confirmed as director and actors Jesse James, Bill Moseley, and Magda Apanowicz were named as its stars. Filming took place in Canterbury, Connecticut during April 2012. To prepare for his role Moseley read both the script and Laimo's novel, which he enjoyed. Brian Spears handled the film's special effects; he stated that his main priority for the film were the movie's ghosts, which were "the reason I took the job".

== Release ==
Dead Souls premiered on Chiller on October 12, 2012, followed by a release on home video through Scream Factory on June 25, 2013.

== Reception ==
Critical reception for the film was predominantly negative. Common criticism for Dead Souls focused on the characters and script. HorrorNews.net panned the film, writing that it was "one of the more inept ghost stories to come along in quite a spell, compliments of Chiller TV. At least SyFy knows how to polish a turd." Common praise centered on Moseley.
