= Marcel the Shell with Shoes On (short film series) =

2010 American short films

- Directed by: Dean Fleischer Camp
- Written by: Jenny Slate; Dean Fleischer-Camp
- Produced by: Dean Fleischer-Camp
- Starring: Jenny Slate
- Edited by: Dean Fleischer Camp
- Release dates: October 16, 2010 (1); November 11, 2011 (2); October 20, 2014 (3)
- Running time: 4 minutes
- Country: United States
- Language: English

Marcel the Shell with Shoes On is a trilogy of American 4-minute stop-motion animated mockumentary short films about an anthropomorphic seashell (voiced by Jenny Slate). The short films were directed, edited and produced by Dean Fleischer Camp who co-wrote with Slate. Fleisher Camp and Slate released a 2021 feature film of the same name about the title character with Slate reprising the role.

== Premise ==
The three short films show the everyday life of Marcel (voiced by Jenny Slate), an anthropomorphic seashell outfitted and dressed with a single googly eye and a pair of miniature shoes.

== Short films ==
Title	Director	Writers	Release date	Summary
Marcel the Shell with Shoes On	Dean Fleischer Camp	Dean Fleischer Camp and Jenny Slate	October 16, 2010	In part 1 of Marcel the Shell With Shoes On, the video begins with Marcel introducing himself to the interviewer. Caught off guard by the camera, he briefly apologizes for the mess before he proceeds to explain his day-to-day life as a shell. As the camera frames him in various locations of the house, Marcel notes things like what he uses as a hat, what happens when he eats cheese, and how he manages to go hang gliding. As he demonstrates for the interviewer how he adapts to his circumstances — taking phone calls and walking his pet lint, Alan — Marcel expresses his fear of soda, regrets of never owning a dog, and the dangers of smelly shoes.
Marcel the Shell with Shoes On, Two	Dean Fleischer Camp	Dean Fleischer Camp and Jenny Slate	November 11, 2011	In part 2 of Marcel the Shell With Shoes On, Marcel brings the audience around his house and answers questions about his day-to-day, activities and tribulations. For Marcel, modes of transportation include, by bug - which requires the driver to be easy going as "you can only go where the bug wants to go" - or by caterpillar bus. After showing the audience his bed, made out of bread, Marcel hangs out next to the sleeping dog, who he conveniently leaves unnamed. He rants about the dogs desire only for treats and nothing else. The dog is a place of fear for Marcel, he hides from it in a large slipper, and cries out when it barks. In his final remarks, Marcel discusses his hardships, like losing his sister to a balloon and longing for a nickname to be given to him. He reminds the audience the importance of always smiling, "[be]cause it's worth it".
Marcel the Shell with Shoes On, Three	Dean Fleischer Camp	Dean Fleischer Camp and Jenny Slate	October 20, 2014	In part 3 of Marcel the Shell with Shoes On, the audience follows the main character, Marcel, as he embarks on a new adventure in his backyard. Marcel shares his thoughts with the audience, expressing a fondness for the intimacy that arises when two individuals find themselves in a tight spot, possibly alluding to himself and the narrator behind the camera. Throughout the episode, Marcel engages in comical rants, including one about the idiotic nature of shrimp, as well as his reflections on stress and frustration. The storyline pivots when Marcel finds himself caught in a storm, which prompts the narrator to ask about his favourite saying. "Life's a party, rock your body," Marcel responds. The episode concludes with Marcel singing through the window after recovering from a minor cold caused by the rain.

== Production ==
The character of Marcel came at an unexpected time. Slate and Dean Fleischer Camp were attending a wedding and were sharing a single hotel room with a group of friends. Things began to feel claustrophobic and tensions began to rise when Slate began voicing her needs in the voice that would come to be that of Marcel. Upon returning home, Fleischer Camp worked with found objects, eventually settling on Polly Pocket shoes, a seashell and a single googly eye.

== Release ==
The first short film premiered theatrically at AFI FEST 2010, where it was awarded Best Animated Short and was an official selection of the 2011 Sundance Film Festival. It won the Grand Jury and Audience Awards at the 2011 New York International Children's Film Festival. Two additional short films were released in 2011 and 2014. The first sequel, titled Marcel the Shell with Shoes On, Two, was posted to YouTube on November 14, 2011. The second sequel, titled Marcel the Shell with Shoes On, Three, was posted to YouTube on October 20, 2014. Each was accompanied by a tie-in storybook featuring Marcel.

== Feature film adaptation ==
Slate and Fleischer Camp announced in 2014 that they planned to create a feature film adaptation of Marcel the Shell with Shoes On. The film premiered at the Telluride Film Festival on 3 September 2021 and it stars Slate, Thomas Mann, Isabella Rossellini and Rosa Salazar. The film received critical acclaim and a nomination for the Academy Award for Best Animated Feature.
