= Marcel the Shell with Shoes On (2021 film) =

American film by Dean Fleischer Camp

- Theatrical release poster
- Directed by: Dean Fleischer Camp
- Screenplay by: Dean Fleischer Camp; Jenny Slate; Nick Paley
- Story by: Dean Fleischer Camp; Jenny Slate; Nick Paley; Elisabeth Holm
- Based on: Characters created by: Dean Fleischer Camp; Jenny Slate
- Produced by: Elisabeth Holm; Andrew Goldman; Caroline Kaplan; Paul Mezey; Dean Fleischer Camp; Jenny Slate; Terry Leonard
- Starring: Jenny Slate; Rosa Salazar; Thomas Mann; Dean Fleischer Camp; Lesley Stahl; Isabella Rossellini
- Cinematography: Bianca Cline
- Edited by: Dean Fleischer Camp; Nick Paley
- Music by: Disasterpeace
- Production companies: Cinereach; You Want I Should; Human Woman; Sunbeam Television & Films; Chiodo Bros. Productions
- Distributed by: A24 (United States and Canada); Universal Pictures International Focus Features (international)
- Release dates: September 3, 2021 (Telluride); June 24, 2022 (United States)
- Running time: 90 minutes
- Country: United States
- Language: English
- Budget: $6 million
- Box office: $7 million

Marcel the Shell with Shoes On is a 2021 American independent mockumentary film directed by Dean Fleischer Camp in his feature directorial debut. Combining live action and stop motion animation, it is based on and serves both as a direct stand-alone sequel and prequel to the series of Marcel the Shell shorts by Jenny Slate and Fleischer Camp, both were co-written with Nick Paley. Slate reprises her voice role as Marcel, an anthropomorphic seashell. Fleischer Camp, Rosa Salazar, Thomas Mann, Lesley Stahl, and Isabella Rossellini also star. The film follows Marcel, a shell who lives with his grandmother, Connie, after posting a short film online bringing Marcel millions of passionate fans and a new hope of reuniting with his long-lost family.

Marcel the Shell with Shoes On premiered at the Telluride Film Festival on September 3, 2021, and began a limited release in the United States by A24 on June 24, 2022, before its wide release on July 15. It was critically acclaimed and nominated for the Academy Award for Best Animated Feature.

== Plot ==
Following the end of his marriage, documentary filmmaker Dean moves into an Airbnb and discovers Marcel, a one-inch-tall talking shell living in the home with his grandmother, Nana Connie, and Alan, his pet ball of lint.

Inspired by Marcel's whimsicality, resourcefulness, and fascination with the world, Dean begins filming Marcel's daily activities, most of which consist of gathering resources from the backyard in order to support himself and Nana Connie. Connie is wise but has some dementia. She tends to her garden assisted by insects she has befriended. Marcel and Connie share their mutual love of 60 Minutes and Lesley Stahl.

After Dean uploads his first video about Marcel to YouTube, it quickly becomes a cultural phenomenon. Marcel is both flattered and overwhelmed with his newfound popularity, lamenting that his family is not around to celebrate it with him. Marcel explains to Dean that there used to be an entire community of shells on the property, including Marcel's mother, father, brother, and aunt. The shells would take shelter in a sock drawer when the house's previous owners, Mark and Larissa, started knocking objects over while fighting. Following one fight, Mark accidentally packed the shells into his suitcase while moving out, leaving Marcel and Connie the only ones left on the property.

Dean helps Marcel produce a livestream on the Internet asking for help in locating his family. The livestream gains a substantial number of viewers, but after Marcel shares his location with viewers, the house becomes a popular area for influencers. Marcel becomes dismayed after realizing most of the people who saw his videos are fans desperate to be associated with him but largely uninterested in helping him.

The constant attention to the house quickly begins to bother Marcel, who is worried about Connie's deteriorating health. Marcel convinces Dean to drive him around the city in search of Mark's car but is overwhelmed to discover how large and vast the world outside his house really is. Realizing that the world is too big to likely discover the car on his own, a discouraged Marcel returns home to find Connie has fallen off the top of a washing machine and cracked her shell. Marcel tends to her wounds and grows more protective of Connie.

As a result of Marcel's Internet popularity, 60 Minutes reaches out to Marcel in the hopes of doing a cover story. Despite Dean's encouragement, Marcel is reluctant to accept the offer, concerned with what the large production crew and more attention to the house would do to Connie's health. Marcel tells Dean he will not accept the interview until Connie is fully recovered. Dean confides this information to a fast-deteriorating Connie. Wanting Marcel to live a meaningful life of his own, Connie pretends to show signs of improvement around Marcel while encouraging him to accept the interview. Despite his strong reservations, Marcel eventually agrees to the interview, believing it may help him find his family.

Connie's health continues to worsen as the day of the interview approaches. Connie and Marcel watch as the 60 Minutes crew sets up in the living room and are starstruck upon seeing Lesley Stahl in person. Marcel and Dean both participate in the interview. Upon its completion, Marcel and Dean struggle to find Connie before realizing she died while their segment was being filmed. Marcel buries Connie in her garden and grieves her. Dean signs a lease for a new apartment.

60 Minutes calls Dean requesting additional filming after making new discoveries regarding the whereabouts of Larissa. The segment airs, showing that they were able to locate Larissa in Guatemala. Larissa then brings the 60 Minutes crew to Mark's house, where she and Mark get into an argument. Marcel urges Dean and the crew to check in Mark's sock drawer, where the entire shell community is discovered. They reunite in the Airbnb with Marcel, who is able to give Connie a proper funeral. Dean moves into his new apartment and begins dating again. Reunited with his family, Marcel confides to Dean that despite missing his family and delighted they are reunited, he often finds himself going to the laundry room window alone and feeling the wind blow through his shell. Marcel shows Dean the sound it produces, remarking on its beauty as he stares out the window and feeling a newfound, deeper connection with all things.

A closing scene interspersed with the early credits shows Dean introducing Marcel to his new apartment.

== Cast ==
- Jenny Slate as the voice of Marcel
- Dean Fleischer Camp as Dean, a documentarian who is a semi-fictionalized version of Fleischer Camp himself, as revealed by blurry shots of a clapperboard showing his full name and of a computer screen showing a real-life photo of him and his ex-wife Slate
- Isabella Rossellini as the voice of Nana Connie, Marcel's Italian grandmother, who calls him "Marcello"
- Rosa Salazar as Larissa Geller
- Thomas Mann as Mark Booth
- Lesley Stahl as herself
- Shari Finkelstein as 60 Minutes producer
- Sarah Thyre as the voice of Catherine, Marcel's mother
- Andy Richter as the voice of Mario, Marcel's father and Connie's son
- Nathan Fielder as the voice of Justin, Marcel's brother
- Jessi Klein as the voice of Judy, Marcel's aunt
- Peter Bonerz as the voice of The Maestro
- Jamie Leonhart as Shell Family (voices)
- Conan O'Brien as himself (Note: Via archive footage of Conan.)
- Brian Williams as himself (Note: Via archive footage of Rock Center with Brian Williams.)
- Jesse Cilio as Darwin

== Production ==
Chiodo Bros. Production (known for the 1988 cult classic Killer Klowns from Outer Space) led animation, with Edward Chiodo as animation producer and Kirsten Lepore as animation director. Stephen Chiodo was the film's supervising animation director. Bianca Cline led live action cinematography, while Eric Adkins (Mars Attacks!, The PJs) led stop-motion cinematography.

== Release ==
The film premiered at the Telluride Film Festival on September 3, 2021. It was also shown at SXSW in March 2022.

In November 2021, A24 acquired the distribution rights. The film was released in select theaters in the United States on June 24, 2022, before releasing nationwide on July 15. The film was released on Blu-ray and 4K Ultra HD on September 5, 2022.

The film was released on February 17, 2023, by Focus Features and Universal Pictures in the United Kingdom.

== Reception ==
=== Box office ===
In the United States and Canada, the film made $169,606 from six theaters in its opening weekend. It then made $262,022 from 22 theaters in its second and $322,167 from 48 theaters in its third. Playing in 153 theaters the following weekend, the film added another $567,918, bringing its four-week running total to $1.7 million. The film expanded to 590 theatres in the second wide weekend, grossing $874,302 with the average revenue on $1,481, finishing eleventh at the box office. It continued to gross $671,361 from 821 theaters in its third wide weekend and $345,484 from 498 theaters in its fourth wide weekend, both times finishing fourteenth at the box office.

=== Critical response ===
On the review aggregator Rotten Tomatoes, 98% of 193 reviews are positive, with an average rating of 8.3/10. The critical consensus reads, "Poignant, profound, and utterly heartwarming, Marcel the Shell with Shoes On is animated entertainment with real heart." Metacritic, which uses a weighted average, assigned the film a score of 80 out of 100 based on 42 critics, indicating "generally favorable" reviews.

=== Accolades ===
The film was nominated for Best Animated Feature at the 95th Academy Awards in 2023, meeting the Academy requirements that "animation must figure in no less than 75 percent of the picture's running time." It was also nominated for a Golden Globe Award for Best Animated Feature Film, but lost to Guillermo del Toro's Pinocchio which would also win the Oscar afterwards.

| Award | Date of ceremony | Category | Recipient(s) | Result | Ref. |
|---|---|---|---|---|---|
| Heartland Film Festival | October 16, 2022 | Truly Moving Picture Award | Dean Fleischer Camp | Won | |
| Hollywood Critics Association Midseason Film Awards | July 1, 2022 | Best Picture | Marcel the Shell with Shoes On | Nominated | |
| Hollywood Critics Association Midseason Film Awards | July 1, 2022 | Best Indie Film | Marcel the Shell with Shoes On | Nominated | |
| Saturn Awards | October 25, 2022 | Best Animated Film Release | Marcel the Shell with Shoes On | Won | |
| New York Film Critics Circle Awards | December 2, 2022 | Best Animated Film | Marcel the Shell with Shoes On | Won | |
| National Board of Review | December 8, 2022 | Best Animated Film | Marcel the Shell with Shoes On | Won | |
| New York Film Critics Online Awards | December 11, 2022 | Best Animated Feature | Marcel the Shell with Shoes On | Won | |
| Los Angeles Film Critics Association Awards | December 11, 2022 | Best Animated Film | Marcel the Shell with Shoes On | Runner-up | |
| Washington D.C. Area Film Critics Association Awards | December 12, 2022 | Best Animated Feature | Marcel the Shell with Shoes On | Nominated | |
| Washington D.C. Area Film Critics Association Awards | December 12, 2022 | Best Voice Performance | Jenny Slate | Won | |
| Chicago Film Critics Association Awards | December 14, 2022 | Best Animated Film | Marcel the Shell with Shoes On | Nominated | |
| Utah Film Critics Association | December 17, 2022 | Best Animated Feature | Marcel the Shell with Shoes On | Won | |
| Utah Film Critics Association | December 17, 2022 | Best Adapted Screenplay | Dean Fleischer Camp, Jenny Slate, Nick Paley and Elisabeth Holm | Won | |
| St. Louis Gateway Film Critics Association Awards | December 18, 2022 | Best Animated Film | Marcel the Shell with Shoes On | Won | |
| St. Louis Gateway Film Critics Association Awards | December 18, 2022 | Best Scene | "Marcel on 60 Minutes" | Nominated | |
| Dallas–Fort Worth Film Critics Association | December 19, 2022 | Best Animated Film | Marcel the Shell with Shoes On | Runner-up | |
| Indiana Film Journalists Association Film Awards | December 19, 2022 | Best Picture | Marcel the Shell with Shoes On | Finalist | |
| Indiana Film Journalists Association Film Awards | December 19, 2022 | Best Animated Film | Marcel the Shell with Shoes On | Won | |
| Indiana Film Journalists Association Film Awards | December 19, 2022 | Best Adapted Screenplay | Dean Fleischer Camp, Jenny Slate, Nick Paley and Elisabeth Holm | Nominated | |
| Indiana Film Journalists Association Film Awards | December 19, 2022 | Best Director | Dean Fleischer Camp | Nominated | |
| Indiana Film Journalists Association Film Awards | December 19, 2022 | Best Vocal/Motion-Capture Performance | Jenny Slate | Won | |
| Indiana Film Journalists Association Film Awards | December 19, 2022 | Best Vocal/Motion-Capture Performance | Isabella Rossellini | Runner-up | |
| Indiana Film Journalists Association Film Awards | December 19, 2022 | Best Musical Score | Disasterpeace | Nominated | |
| Indiana Film Journalists Association Film Awards | December 19, 2022 | Original Vision | Marcel the Shell with Shoes On | Runner-up | |
| Phoenix Film Critics Society | December 19, 2022 | Best Animated Feature | Marcel the Shell with Shoes On | Won | |
| Phoenix Film Critics Society | December 19, 2022 | PFCS 2022 Top Ten | Marcel the Shell with Shoes On | Won | |
| Phoenix Film Critics Society | December 19, 2022 | The Overlooked Film of the Year | Marcel the Shell with Shoes On | Won | |
| Florida Film Critics Circle | December 22, 2022 | Best Animated Film | Marcel the Shell with Shoes On | Nominated | |
| Alliance of Women Film Journalists | January 5, 2023 | Best Animated Film | Marcel the Shell with Shoes On | Nominated | |
| Alliance of Women Film Journalists | January 5, 2023 | Best Animated Female | "Connie" (Isabella Rossellini) | Won | |
| San Diego Film Critics Society | January 6, 2023 | Best Animated Film | Marcel the Shell with Shoes On | Runner-up | |
| Toronto Film Critics Association | January 8, 2023 | Best Animated Film | Marcel the Shell with Shoes On | Runner-up | |
| Toronto Film Critics Association | January 8, 2023 | Best First Feature | Marcel the Shell with Shoes On | Runner-up | |
| San Francisco Bay Area Film Critics Circle | January 9, 2023 | Best Animated Feature | Marcel the Shell with Shoes On | Nominated | |
| Austin Film Critics Association | January 10, 2023 | Best Animated Film | Marcel the Shell with Shoes On | Won | |
| Austin Film Critics Association | January 10, 2023 | Best First Film | Dean Fleischer Camp | Nominated | |
| Austin Film Critics Association | January 10, 2023 | Best Voice Acting/Animated/Digital Performance | Jenny Slate | Won | |
| Cinema Eye Honors | January 13, 2023 | Heterodox Award | Marcel the Shell with Shoes On | Nominated | |
| Seattle Film Critics Society | January 17, 2023 | Best Animated Feature | Marcel the Shell with Shoes On | Won | |
| Golden Globe Awards | January 10, 2023 | Best Motion Picture – Animated | Marcel the Shell with Shoes On | Nominated | |
| Georgia Film Critics Association Awards | January 13, 2023 | Best Animated Film | Marcel the Shell with Shoes On | Runner-up | |
| Critics' Choice Movie Awards | January 15, 2023 | Best Animated Feature | Marcel the Shell with Shoes On | Nominated | |
| Online Film Critics Society | January 23, 2023 | Best Animated Feature | Marcel the Shell with Shoes On | Nominated | |
| Art Directors Guild Awards | February 18, 2023 | Excellence in Production Design for an Animated Film | Liz Toonkel | Nominated | |
| British Academy Film Awards | February 19, 2023 | Best Animated Film | Dean Fleisher Camp, Andrew Goldman, Elisabeth Holm, Caroline Kaplan, Paul Mezey | Nominated | |
| Houston Film Critics Society | February 18, 2023 | Best Animated Feature | Marcel the Shell with Shoes On | Nominated | |
| Hollywood Critics Association Awards | February 24, 2023 | Best Animated Film | Marcel the Shell with Shoes On | Nominated | |
| Hollywood Critics Association Awards | February 24, 2023 | Best Indie Film | Marcel the Shell with Shoes On | Won | |
| Hollywood Critics Association Awards | February 24, 2023 | Best Voice or Motion-Capture Performance | Jenny Slate | Won | |
| Annie Awards | February 25, 2023 | Best Animated Feature — Independent | Marcel the Shell with Shoes On | Won | |
| Annie Awards | February 25, 2023 | Outstanding Achievement for Directing in an Animated Feature Production | Dean Fleischer Camp, Kirsten Lepore, Stephen Chiodo | Nominated | |
| Annie Awards | February 25, 2023 | Outstanding Achievement for Voice Acting in an Animated Feature Production | Jenny Slate | Won | |
| Annie Awards | February 25, 2023 | Outstanding Achievement for Writing in an Animated Feature Production | Dean Fleischer Camp, Jenny Slate, Nick Paley, Elisabeth Holm | Won | |
| Producers Guild of America Awards | February 25, 2023 | Outstanding Producer of Animated Theatrical Motion Pictures | Elisabeth Holm, Andrew Goldman, Paul Mezey, and Caroline Kaplan | Nominated | |
| Satellite Awards | March 3, 2023 | Best Motion Picture – Animated or Mixed Media | Marcel the Shell with Shoes On | Won | |
| Independent Spirit Awards | March 4, 2023 | Best Editing | Dean Fleischer-Camp and Nick Paley | Nominated | |
| American Cinema Editors Awards | March 5, 2023 | Best Edited Animated Feature Film | Dean Fleischer Camp and Nick Paley | Nominated | |
| Academy Awards | March 12, 2023 | Best Animated Feature Film | Dean Fleischer Camp, Elisabeth Holm, Andrew Goldman, Caroline Kaplan and Paul Mezey | Nominated | |
