= Geraldine Hughes =

Northern Irish actress

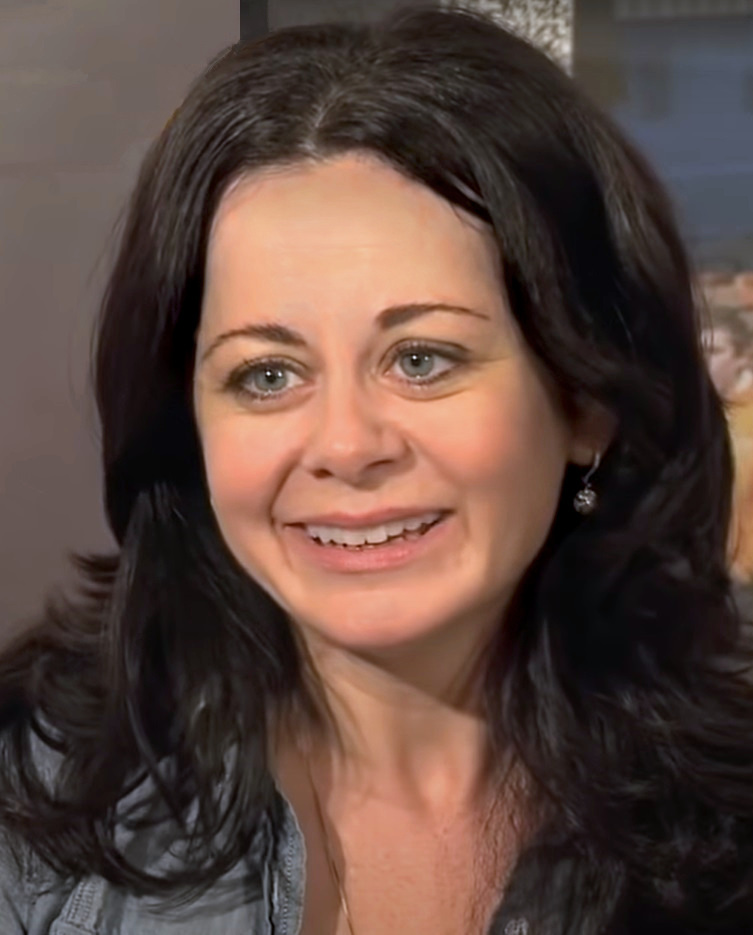
- Hughes in 2013
- Born: 1970 (age 55–56); Belfast, Northern Ireland
- Education: University of California, Los Angeles
- Occupation: Actress
- Years active: 1984–present
- Height: 5 ft 3 in (1.60 m)

Geraldine Hughes (born 1970) is an actress from Belfast, Northern Ireland. Born in West Belfast, Hughes has appeared in films such as Duplex, Rocky Balboa, and Gran Torino. She also played Mary Todd Lincoln in Killing Lincoln. More recently, she performed a solo play written by herself, Belfast Blues.

== Early life ==
Hughes grew up in the Divis Flats in Belfast, Northern Ireland, during The Troubles. To get herself through the tough times, Hughes participated in her school's drama club. She loved school, saying it made her feel safe and she enjoyed the structure it provided. It was where she escaped from The Troubles. After being chosen for her role in the film Children in the Crossfire, Hughes spent her first summer in the United States. She had no acting experience beyond her school's drama club before accepting her role as Mary in the movie.

== Education ==
In Belfast, Hughes attended St. Louise's Comprehensive College in the '80s. Later, she attended the University of California in Los Angeles (UCLA) with a private scholarship from those she worked with in the film Children in the Crossfire. While they paid her tuition, she paid her living expenses. Hughes graduated from the university with a BA from the School of Theater, Film and TV. And in 2009, Queens University in Belfast awarded Hughes an honorary doctorate for her contributions to the performing arts.

== Career ==
When Hughes was just 14, American TV producers auditioned hundreds of children in Ireland for their film and of the hundreds, three were chosen to participate in the film, Hughes being one of them. This first film debut of hers was in the movie, Children of the Crossfire in the year 1984. Later, during her first years in Los Angeles, Hughes became a part-time nanny to Danny DeVito and Rhea Perlman's children.

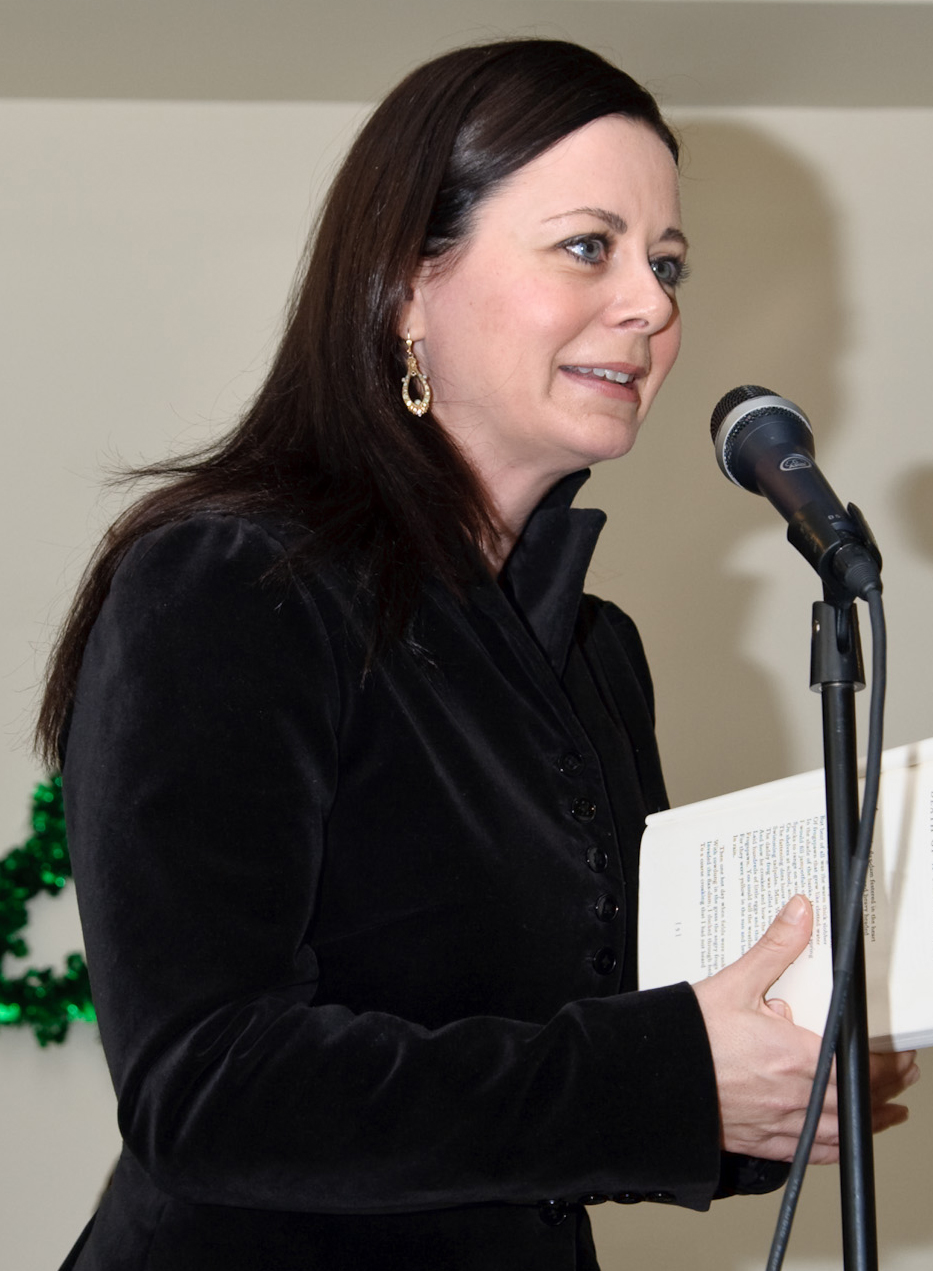
Geraldine Hughes in New York City in March 2009

After a theater performance, Hughes was contacted by a casting director and asked to audition for the role of Marie in Rocky Balboa, a role she is arguably most known for.

Hughes has been and continues to work in the field of performing arts.

== Family and personal life ==
Hughes comes from a working-class family in Belfast, Northern Ireland. She grew up in a Catholic household. Because she lived during The Troubles, Hughes experienced life in a war zone. Belfast Blues is a play she wrote detailing her real life experiences from her life in Belfast. As a child, Hughes never spoke of the horrors she witnessed in Belfast. Her performances of this play are dedicated “to all the children who live in places of conflict.” Hughes left Belfast at the age of 18. She lived in Los Angeles for 16 years then moved to New York City. Family comes first for Hughes as she regularly returns to Belfast for visits.

Hughes was married to an American from Pennsylvania, Ian Harrington. He also "came from nothin'' as his family was very poor. He was the first to encourage Hughes to share her story.

== Filmography and theatrical appearances ==
=== Film ===
Year	Title	Role	Notes
1984	Children in the Crossfire	Mary	
1997	St. Patrick's Day	Maeve	
1986	The End of the World Man	Barbara	
2003	Duplex	Receptionist	
2006	Rocky Balboa	Marie	
2008	Gran Torino	Karen Kowalski	
2009	Pumpgirl	Sinead	
2012	Dead Souls	Mary Petrie	
2013	Killing Lincoln	Mary Todd Lincoln	
2014	Time Out of Mind	Marie	
2017	The Book of Henry	Mrs. Evans	
2020	Nine Days	Colleen	

=== Television ===
Year	Title	Role	Notes
1998	ER	Susan McFarlan	
2003	Murder She Wrote	Fiona Byrne	
2007–2017	Law & Order: Special Victims Unit	Tina Parven/Denise Drake	TV series, 2 episodes
2008	Law & Order	Sandra Talbot	
2010	Nurse Jackie	Molly Gaherty	
2010	Mercy	Tammy Singer	
2010	The Good Wife	Rachel Knox	
2010	Law & Order: Criminal Intent	Regina	
2013	Blue Bloods	Meara McGuire	
2013–2017	The Blacklist	Dr. Nina	TV series, 3 episodes
2020	Your Honor	Betty	Episode: “Part Two”

=== Theater ===
Year	Title	Role	Notes
	Jerusalem		Westend and Broadway productions
	Particle of Dread		
	Cyrano De Bergerac		Broadway
	Translations	Bridget	Broadway
	Molly Sweeney		
	Orson's Shadow		
	The Cripple Inishmaan		
	The Architect		
	Belfast Blues	24 characters	a solo play written by Hughes, based on real life events

== Awards and nominations ==
Hughes received her first award in 2003, the Los Angeles Ovation Award. Just a year later, in 2004 she received the Garland and Drama Critics Circle Awards. Hughes also received a nomination for Distinguished Performance from the Drama League Award for her acting in her solo play, Belfast Blues, in 2004.
