= Jaiden Kaine =

American actor

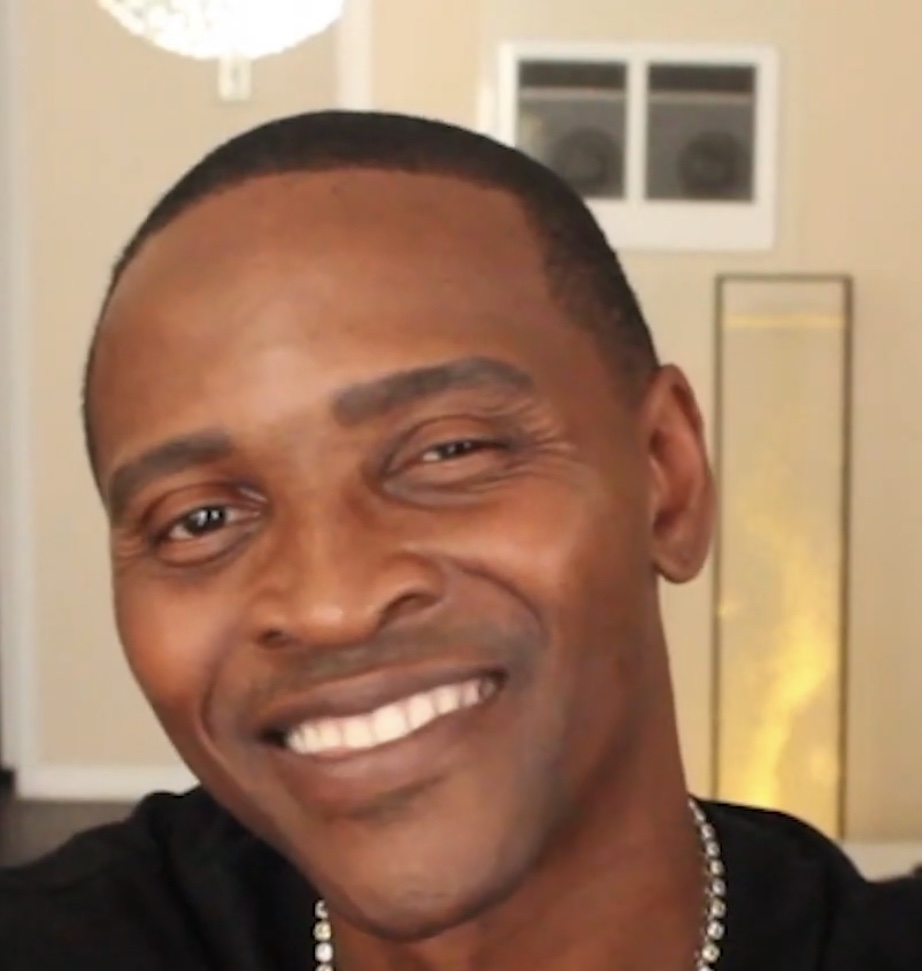
- Kaine in 2019
- Born: New York City, United States
- Occupation: Actor
- Years active: 2010–present

Jaiden Kaine is an American actor. He is known for his roles in Killing Lincoln and The Vampire Diaries. He has Cuban, Irish, and Antiguan ancestry. He was a member of the military outfit Blackwater.

== Filmography ==
Film
Year	Title	Role	Notes
2011	If You Could Hear My Own Tune	D.L. Boyfriend	Voice only
2011	Extremely Loud & Incredibly Close	Business Man	
2011	Ninja B-Boy	3G	Short
2011	Gasp	Security Guard	Short
2011	Chess Boxing	Velvet Rope Bouncer	
2012	Welcome to Pine Hill	Jay	
2012	The Dictator	African King	
2012	Zoo	Head of DEA – Anthony Barnes	
2012	Dead Souls	Andrew Judson	
2014	Candid	Max	
2015	Mr. Right	Bruce	
2016	Misconduct	Doctor Hughes	
2016	Cold Moon	Henry Harp	
2016	Hidden Figures	Joshua Coleman	
2019	Marriage Killer	Detective Erickson	
2020	Forgotten Kingdom: The Divide	Funeral Director	
2021	Alabama Girl	Kilo	
2022	Lone Road	Detective Crenshaw	Filming

Television and web
Year	Title	Role	Notes
2010	The Big C	Naked Lenny	(1 episode)
2011	30 Rock	Angie's friend	(1 episode)
2013	Killing Lincoln	Oswell Swann	TV movie
2013	Orange Is the New Black	Airport Bystander	(1 episode)
2014	Believe	Security Officer	(1 episode)
2014	Person of Interest	Federal Agent	(1 episode)
2015–2016	The Vampire Diaries	Beau	Recurring (season 7 - 12 episodes)
2015	Zoo	Kenyan Policeman	(1 episode)
2014–2016	The Peter Austin Noto Show	Calvin Klein Model	Recurring cast (16 episodes)
2016	Luke Cage	Zip	(10 episodes)
2016	Brooklynification	The Broker	Recurring cast (2 episodes)
2017	Six	Senior Officer Okafor	(1 episode)
2018	Valor	Khalid Samatar	Recurring cast (8 episodes)
2019	S.W.A.T.	Yusef Ahmed	(1 episode)
2020	For Life	Green	(1 episode)
2021	Just My Type	Alex	Writer
2022	NCIS: Hawaiʻi	Bandile	(1 episode)
2022	Long Slow Exhale	Deputy Belmont	Recurring cast (4 episodes)
2022	Three Women	Issac	(1 episode)
