= Gods and Monsters (The Vampire Diaries) =

- The Vampire Diaries episode
- Episode no.: Season 7 Episode 22
- Directed by: Michael A. Allowitz
- Written by: Brian Young
- Production code: 3J5722
- Original air date: May 13, 2016

Guest appearances
- Ana Nogueira (Penny Ares); Andrea Laing (EMT); Lily Rose Mumford (Josie Saltzman); Tierney Mumford (Lizzie Saltzman); Aisha Duran (Virginia St. John); Nina Dobrev (Elena Gilbert) (archive footage/voice role; uncredited)

Episode chronology
← Previous "Requiem for a Dream"	Next → "Hello Brother"
- The Vampire Diaries season 7

"Gods and Monsters" is the 22nd episode of the seventh season of the American series The Vampire Diaries and the series' 155th episode overall. "Gods and Monsters" was originally aired on May 13, 2016, on The CW. The episode was written by Brian Young and directed by Michael A. Allowitz.

== Plot ==
Enzo (Michael Malarkey), Damon (Ian Somerhalder), Stefan (Paul Wesley) and Caroline try coming up with plans to open The Armory while Matt (Zach Roerig) and Bonnie (Kat Graham) are chasing after them. While doing so, they meet an accident that injures Matt badly. Alaric (Matt Davis) and Caroline decide on making the twins open up the vault by siphoning off Bonnie's spell. Penny's spirit makes Matt realize that he deserves better, making him regain consciousness. The twins open the Armory. Damon and Stefan go inside. Enzo lures Bonnie to the cabin letting Damon and Stefan buy more time. The tiny cabin gets nasty as Bonnie, unable to hold her urges, holds a stake down Enzo's chest. While searching, Damon and Stefan finally approach the vault which Damon decides to venture in, alone. He assures Stefan that in some way or another, everything will be okay. They share a handshake and hug and part ways as Damon finally gets inside the vault. Enzo recollects the previous 3 years he shared with Bonnie as he struggles to stop her from impaling him while Damon, just in time, finds the Everlasting's body, sets it on fire thus severing the link and lifting the curse off of Bonnie. Outside, Alaric tells Caroline to stay back with Stefan and parts ways on good terms saying that no matter what, they will always be family. Stefan and Caroline get back together. A rejoiced Bonnie forgives Damon on the phone and while he's getting out, he starts hearing Elena (Nina Dobrev)'s voice. Enzo and Bonnie warn Damon that it is the vault playing tricks with his mind but he keeps following the voice and something scary overpowers him. Enzo rushes in to help encountering a strange Damon. The monster takes Enzo as well.

Flashforward: Three months from now, Everybody's trying to find Enzo and Damon, Alaric manages to crack open the code for the vault but they find it empty. Bonnie remains helpless as she lost two of her closest people and her magic never came back. Gradually, the rest start getting reports of large number of people going missing and they realize it's them, but they don't know where to start looking. Somewhere far off, Damon and Enzo have lost every shred of humanity and killing endless people for the sake of sport. Stefan is shown writing his journal to Elena promising that he'll get them back and whatever Damon does in all this time, it's not his fault.

== Feature music ==
In the episode "Gods and Monsters" we can hear the songs:

- "Horns" by Bryce Fox
- "Like a Funeral" by Erik Jonasson
- "Silhouette" by Aquilo
- "Don't Panic (Coldplay song)" by Clairity
