= Dean Fleischer Camp =

American filmmaker (born 1984)

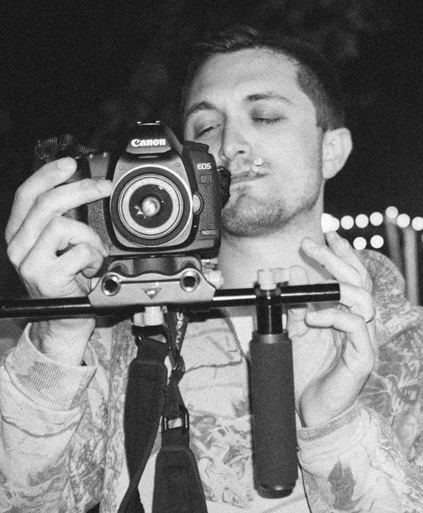
- Fleischer Camp pictured at SXSW 2013
- Born: February 28, 1984 (age 42); Henrico County, Virginia, U.S.
- Education: Douglas S. Freeman High School; New York University (BFA)
- Occupations: Film director; producer; screenwriter
- Years active: 2008–present
- Spouse: Jenny Slate (m. 2012; div. 2016)

Dean Fleischer Camp (Note: Also spelled as Dean Fleischer-Camp according to some sources. This article presumes his surname to be "Fleischer Camp" due to this prior hyphenation.) (born February 28, 1984) is an American film director, film producer, screenwriter and film editor. He created the Marcel the Shell with Shoes On short films with Jenny Slate, to whom he was married from 2012 to 2016. He also directed and starred in the feature film of the same name, which he co-wrote with Slate and Nick Paley. For their work in the feature film, Fleischer Camp and Paley were nominated for the Independent Spirit Award for Best Editing at the 38th Independent Spirit Awards. Fleischer Camp was also nominated for the Academy Award for Best Animated Feature at the 95th Academy Awards.

He also directed the 2016 collage film Fraud and the 2025 live-action remake of Lilo & Stitch.

== Early life ==
Fleischer Camp is a graduate of the New York University Tisch School of the Arts. His mother was a social worker. He grew up in Henrico County, Virginia and graduated from Douglas S. Freeman High School.

== Personal life ==
In September 2012, Fleischer Camp married actress Jenny Slate. The pair announced their separation in May 2016. They collaborated on the Marcel the Shell with Shoes On works, including the books, the short films, and later the 2021 feature film, the last of which subtly alludes to their previous marriage in a few scenes.

== Filmography ==
=== Film ===
Year	Title	Director	Producer	Writer	Notes
2016	Fraud	Yes	No	No	
2021	Marcel the Shell with Shoes On	Yes	Yes	Yes	Also editor and actor (as "Dean")
2025	Lilo & Stitch	Yes	No	No	Also additional editor

=== Television ===
Year	Title	Director	Writer	Editor	Notes
2010	Superego	No	No	Yes	TV movie
2014	Thank You Very Much with Host Jack Antonoff	No	Yes	No	TV movie
2014	Rubberhead	Yes	No	No	TV movie
2015	Better. Dumber. Faster. with Kurt Braunohler	Yes	No	No	TV special
2019	The Bible	Yes	Yes	Yes	TV short

=== Short film ===
Year	Title	Director	Producer	Writer	DoP	Editor
2008	Steven	No	No	No	No	Yes
2009	Science Fair (Or: Migratory Patterns & the Flight of the March Brown Mayfly)	Yes	No	Yes	No	Yes
2009	Fashion Kills!	Yes	No	No	No	Yes
2009	Reality Boom	No	No	No	No	Yes
2010	Marcel the Shell with Shoes On	Yes	Yes	Yes	No	Yes
2011	Marcel the Shell with Shoes On, Two	Yes	Yes	Yes	No	Yes
2012	Smile	Yes	Yes	No	Yes	Yes
2013	We Do Not Belong	Yes	No	Yes	No	Yes
2014	Catherine	Yes	No	Yes	No	Yes
2014	Marcel the Shell with Shoes On, Three	Yes	Yes	Yes	No	Yes
2016	Hospital Head Doctor	Yes	No	Yes	No	No
