= Welcome to Pine Hill =

- Directed by: Keith Miller
- Written by: Keith Miller
- Story by: Keith Miller
- Produced by: Elisabeth Holm; Keith Miller
- Starring: Shanon Harper
- Cinematography: Begonia Colomar; Lily Henderson; Alex Mallis; Eric Phillips-Horst
- Edited by: Keith Miller
- Production companies: Esopus Creek Pictures; Meerkat Media Collective
- Distributed by: Oscilloscope
- Release dates: January 2012 (Slamdance); March 1, 2013 (United States)
- Running time: 81 minutes
- Country: United States
- Language: English

Welcome to Pine Hill is a 2012 American drama film written and directed by Keith Miller and starring Shanon Harper.

== Reception ==
The film has an 86% rating on Rotten Tomatoes. Nick McCarthy of Slant Magazine awarded the film two and a half stars out of four.
