= Obvious Child =

2014 film by Gillian Robespierre

- Theatrical release poster
- Directed by: Gillian Robespierre
- Screenplay by: Gillian Robespierre
- Story by: Gillian Robespierre; Karen Maine; Elisabeth Holm
- Based on: Obvious Child by Anna Bean; Karen Maine; Gillian Robespierre
- Produced by: Elisabeth Holm
- Starring: Jenny Slate; Jake Lacy; Gaby Hoffmann; Gabe Liedman; Richard Kind; Polly Draper; David Cross
- Cinematography: Chris Teague
- Edited by: Casey Brooks; Jacob Craycroft
- Music by: Chris Bordeaux
- Production companies: Rooks Nest Entertainment; Sundial Pictures; Votiv Films
- Distributed by: A24
- Release dates: January 17, 2014 (Sundance); June 6, 2014 (United States)
- Running time: 83 minutes
- Country: United States
- Language: English
- Budget: $1 million
- Box office: $3.3 million

Obvious Child is a 2014 American romantic comedy-drama film written and directed by Gillian Robespierre (in her directorial debut) and stars Jenny Slate, Jake Lacy, Gaby Hoffmann and David Cross. The story follows Donna, a stand-up comedian, who has a drunken one-night stand with a man named Max after breaking up with her boyfriend. She subsequently finds out she is pregnant and decides to have an abortion.

Obvious Child originated as a 2009 short film which was written by Robespierre, Anna Bean and Karen Maine, and also starred Slate in the main role. By making the film, Robespierre hoped to remove the stigma surrounding abortion and to correct what she perceived as a misrepresentation of unplanned pregnancy in earlier films. She finished the feature-length script in 2012.

The film premiered at the Sundance Film Festival on January 17, 2014, and was released in theaters on June 6, 2014. It grossed $3.3 million and was well received by critics. David Edelstein, Mick LaSalle and Dana Stevens praised the film's portrayal of abortion, while A. O. Scott and Ty Burr highlighted its realism and humor. The film won numerous accolades, including two awards from the National Board of Review and two Independent Spirit Award nominations.

== Plot ==
After performing a set at her regular comedy club, Donna Stern is dumped in the bathroom by her boyfriend, Ryan, who confesses he is leaving her for one of her friends. Donna tailspins into a wave of depression and later drunkenly delivers a terrible set in which she insults her ex-boyfriend. Later that night, at the bar, she meets Max, who is there with clients but who missed her set. Donna and Max have an instant connection and they end up having sex. In the morning Donna leaves Max's apartment without saying goodbye.

Several weeks after their one-night stand, Donna discovers that her breasts are sore while trying on clothes and suspects she is pregnant. A home pregnancy test later confirms this. Donna visits a Planned Parenthood clinic to schedule an abortion and discovers the only dates available are her mother's birthday and Valentine's Day; she picks Valentine's Day.

Max tracks Donna down at the bookstore where she works and they have the first of several awkward conversations. Donna then runs into Max when he stops by her mother's apartment to return a book to her mother, Nancy, who is a former professor of his. They have dinner together where Donna is prepared to tell Max about her pregnancy and impending abortion, but cannot bring herself to tell him after he makes a comment about how he wants to be a grandfather someday. He comes to Donna's comedy show, but her set is canceled and she leaves with another man, Sam. She has an awkward evening with Sam and quickly leaves. After her terrible night, Donna visits her mother to talk about her upcoming abortion. Her mother comforts her by telling her that she too had an abortion before Donna was conceived.

Donna regrets pushing Max away and leaves him several unreturned voicemails apologizing and saying she really does need to talk to him. As a final effort, she invites him to the club to see her perform. Max arrives just as she goes on stage to perform a set about how she is pregnant and will have an abortion the next day. Max leaves, but on the day of Donna's abortion, he arrives at her home with flowers and asks if he can accompany her to her procedure. While at the clinic he tells her he supports her, and that when he said that he wanted to be a grandfather, he didn’t mean tomorrow but sometime far in the future. After the abortion, Max takes Donna to his home where he makes her tea, and then they watch Gone with the Wind together.

== Cast ==
- Jenny Slate as Donna Stern, a comedian who works at a bookstore
- Jake Lacy as Max, Donna's love interest
- Gaby Hoffmann as Nellie, Donna's roommate and best friend
- David Cross as Sam, a comedian and friend of Donna's
- Gabe Liedman as Joey, Donna and Nellie's friend, who is also a comedian
- Richard Kind as Jacob Stern, Donna's father
- Polly Draper as Nancy Stern, Donna's mother
- Paul Briganti as Ryan, Donna's ex-boyfriend
- Cindy Cheung as Dr. Bernard, a physician at the Planned Parenthood clinic
- Stephen Singer as Gene, owner of the bookstore at which Donna works

== Production ==
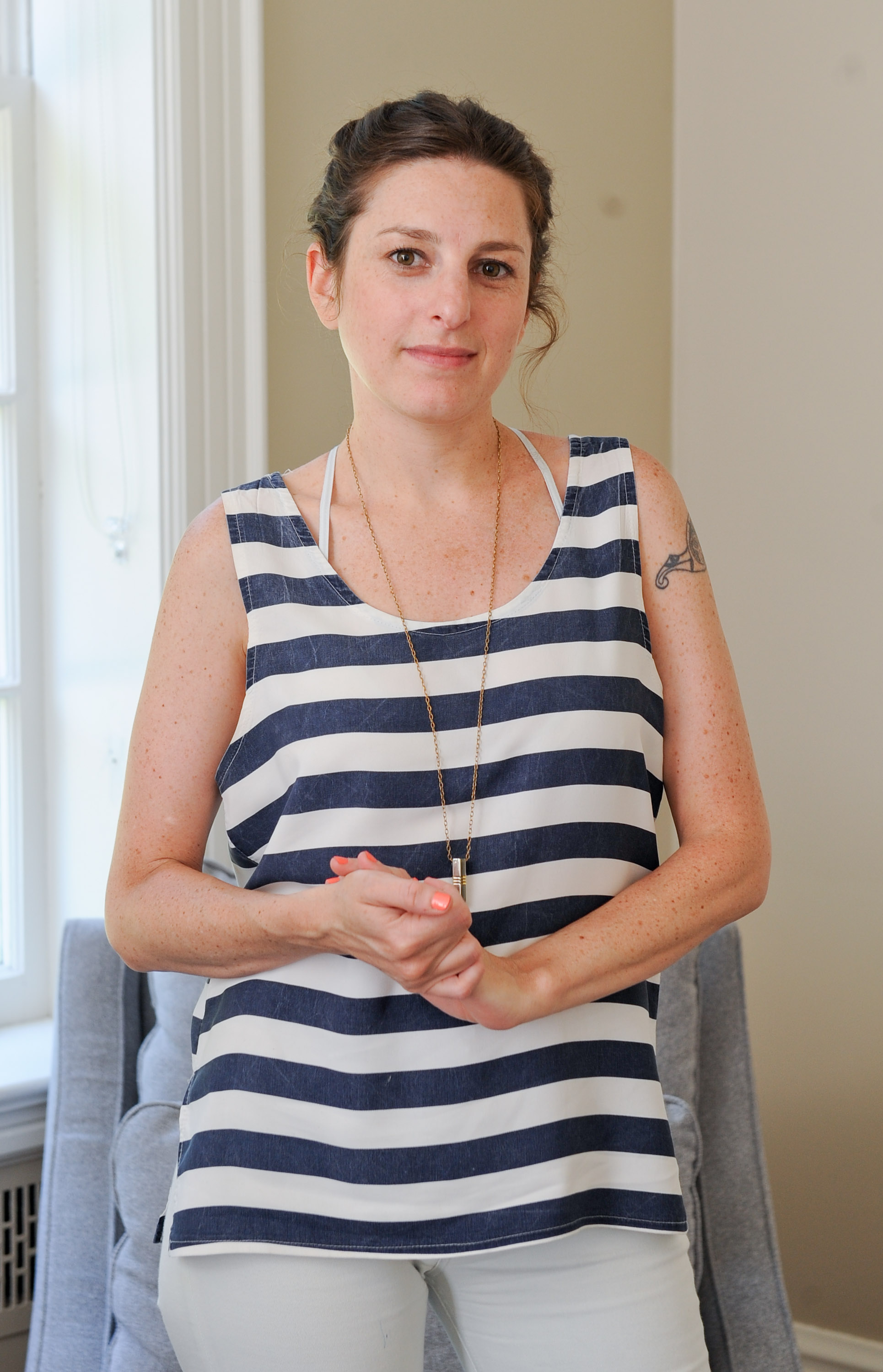
Gillian Robespierre wrote and directed Obvious Child, which was based on a short film she made in 2009.

Obvious Child originated as a short film of the same name about an unemployed woman who decides to terminate her pregnancy resulting from a one-night stand, which was written by Gillian Robespierre, Anna Bean and Karen Maine. Robespierre said that the story was spawned from her frustration with what she perceived as a "misrepresentation of women on screen when it came to unplanned pregnancy", in films such as Juno (2007), Knocked Up (2007) and Waitress (2007). Robespierre, Bean and Maine, feeling "disenchanted with the representation of young women's experience with becoming pregnant", wanted to make a film that destigmatized an abortion by featuring a woman who terminates a pregnancy without regretting her decision. Jenny Slate was cast as the lead after Robespierre and Bean saw Slate performing stand-up comedy. The short was produced in 2009 and released on the video-sharing website Vimeo, where it was watched by 40,000 people.

Inspired by the responses to the short film, Robespierre decided to expand the story into a feature film, and wrote an extended screenplay with Karen Maine and Elisabeth Holm. Although the writers wanted to "stick as close ... as possible" to the original story and characters, they changed the lead character's profession to stand-up comedy. The film's stand-up scenes were written by Robespierre, who tried to emulate Jenny Slate's style of comedy, and were revised by Slate and Gabe Liedman, another comedian, who also volunteered their own material. The script was written over an 18-month period before Robespierre and Holm began to seek financiers to fund the film's production; they started sending the script to potential financiers in November 2012. It was financed through a variety of sources, including the production companies Animal Kingdom Films, Rooks Nest Entertainment, Sundial Pictures and Votiv Films, as well as grants from Rooftop Films, the Tribeca Film Institute and the San Francisco Film Society.

The film was shot by cinematographer Chris Teague over 18 days in New York during April 2013. The filmmakers were given permission by Planned Parenthood to film for a day in the organization's New Rochelle clinic. The film was edited by Casey Brooks in Greenpoint, Brooklyn, and the score was written by Robespierre's boyfriend.

== Release ==
Obvious Child premiered at the 2014 Sundance Film Festival on January 17, 2014. A Kickstarter campaign to help send the film to Sundance was created by the director on December 13, 2013, earning a total of $37,214 by January 14, 2014. Independent film distributor A24 bought the film's North American distribution rights, while international distribution rights were purchased by The Exchange. Obvious Child was released in the United States on June 6, 2014

Posters for the film advertised it as an "abortion comedy". Gillian Robespierre said that she found the descriptor reductive, but also said that she was pleased that the word "abortion" was being used on the film's poster and in headlines about the film. Writing for Entertainment Weekly, Emily Blake speculated that the film's lack of recognition in mainstream award circles may have been due to its label as "the abortion comedy". NBC drew criticism for requesting that the word "abortion" be removed from an online advertisement for the film; it apologized after a petition circulated by Planned Parenthood accused the network of censorship. The film was marketed in conjunction with the abortion-rights organization NARAL Pro-Choice America.

The film was released on DVD and Blu-ray in North America on October 7, 2014. Extra features include an audio commentary with Robespierre, Elisabeth Holm and Jenny Slate, a featurette about the film's production, a collection of extended scenes, and the original 2009 Obvious Child short film on which the feature was based.

== Reception ==
=== Box office ===
Obvious Child earned $3,123,963 at the box office in 18 weeks. It also earned $197,361 and $4,093 in the United Kingdom and New Zealand respectively, making a total gross of $3,325,417.

=== Critical response ===
On Rotten Tomatoes, the film has an approval rating of 90% based on 168 reviews, with an average rating of 7.3/10. The critical consensus from the website states, "Tackling a sensitive subject with maturity, honesty, and wit, Obvious Child serves as a deeply promising debut for writer-director Gillian Robespierre." On Metacritic, the film has a score of 76 out of 100, based on 35 critics, indicating "generally favorable reviews".

Peter Travers described Obvious Child as "uniquely special" in Rolling Stone, while The Washington Post's Ann Hornaday described it as "one of the most startlingly honest romantic comedies to appear onscreen in years". Ty Burr of The Boston Globe found the characters sympathetic and realistic, and enjoyed the humor. The New York Times' chief critic A. O. Scott praised the film for striking a balance between humor and sentimentality, writing, "It's both funny and serious without trying too hard to be either, and by trying above all to be honest." Peter Debruge described Jenny Slate as "wildly funny" in Variety, while Marc Mohan called her performance "endearing and real" in The Oregonian. The Hollywood Reporter's Todd McCarthy was also impressed by Slate's performance and opined that the supporting cast members were equally impressive.

Numerous critics praised Obvious Child for its portrayal of abortion, including Dana Stevens of Slate, who wrote that the way Donna's abortion was portrayed was humane and politically neutral but also that the film, "for all its lightness of tone, is radical". In a review for The Guardian, Xan Brooks described the film as "fresh and funny and really rather brave" for handling a controversial topic that other filmmakers routinely avoid. New York critic David Edelstein called Robespierre "brave enough to be ambivalent" in choosing not to include a blatant political message in the film. The San Francisco Chronicle's Mick LaSalle similarly concluded that "If the movie has a political statement, it's a subtle one"; he also praised the film for treating the topic sincerely while still maintaining a humorous tone.

Conversely, Michelle Golberg suggested in a review for The Nation that the film's popularity with critics was not due to its quality but rather its taboo subject matter: "If the ordinary drama of abortion were more regularly represented in the movies, Obvious Child wouldn't be much more than an amusing hipster diversion." Kate Taylor of The Globe and Mail expressed a similar sentiment and opined that many of the film's jokes were crude and lacking in humor. USA Today's Scott Bowles also found Obvious Child unfunny, describing the characters as "so morbid and whiny that the jokes don't work, even as irony".

The film was criticized by a variety of conservative and anti-abortion groups and publications. In an article for The Human Life Review, Mary Rose Somarriba dismissed the film as "obvious propaganda". Katelyn Beaty, meanwhile, who reviewed Obvious Child for Christianity Today, wrote: "While I ultimately disagree with Robespierre's political aims, at the least she has provided a sometimes funny, often tender portrait of many (though not all) women who face an unplanned pregnancy."

=== Accolades ===
List of accolades received by Obvious Child
Award	Category	Recipients	Result	Ref(s)
Chicago Film Critics Association Awards	Most Promising Performer	Jenny Slate	Nominated	
Critics' Choice Movie Awards	Best Actress in a Comedy	Jenny Slate	Won	
Dorian Awards	Unsung Film of the Year		Nominated	
Georgia Film Critics Association Awards	Breakthrough Award	Jenny Slate	Nominated	
Gotham Awards	Breakthrough Performance	Jenny Slate	Nominated	
Independent Spirit Awards	Best Female Lead	Jenny Slate	Nominated	
Independent Spirit Awards	Best First Feature	Gillian Robespierre and Elisabeth Holm	Nominated	
Kansas City Film Critics Circle Awards	Best Adapted Screenplay	Gillian Robespierre	Won	
Alliance of Women Film Journalists Awards	Best Woman Screenwriter	Gillian Robespierre	Nominated	
Alliance of Women Film Journalists Awards	Best Breakthrough Performance	Jenny Slate	Nominated	
National Board of Review Awards	Best Directorial Debut	Gillian Robespierre	Won	
National Board of Review Awards	Top 10 Independent Films		Won	
NewNowNext Awards	Best New Film Actress	Jenny Slate	Nominated	
Newport Beach Film Festival	Breakout Performance	Jenny Slate	Won	
North Carolina Film Critics Association Awards	Tar Heel Award	Jake Lacy	Nominated	
Phoenix Film Critics Society Awards	Overlooked Film of the Year		Nominated	
Phoenix Film Critics Society Awards	Breakthrough Performance on Camera	Jenny Slate	Nominated	
Phoenix Film Critics Society Awards	Breakthrough Performance Behind the Camera	Gillian Robespierre	Nominated	
Rotterdam International Film Festival	Big Screen Award	Gillian Robespierre	Nominated	
Rotterdam International Film Festival	KNF Award	Gillian Robespierre	Nominated	
Santa Barbara International Film Festival	Virtuosos Award	Jenny Slate	Won	
Seattle International Film Festival	Best Actress	Jenny Slate	Nominated	
Sundance Film Festival	Red Crown Producer's Award	Elisabeth Holm	Won	
Women Film Critics Circle Awards	Best Comedic Actress	Jenny Slate	Won	
Women Film Critics Circle Awards	Best Female Images in a Film		Nominated	
Women Film Critics Circle Awards	Best Screen Couple		Nominated	
Women Film Critics Circle Awards	Best Woman Storyteller	Gillian Robespierre	Nominated	
