= Jenny Slate =

American actress, comedian, and writer (born 1982)

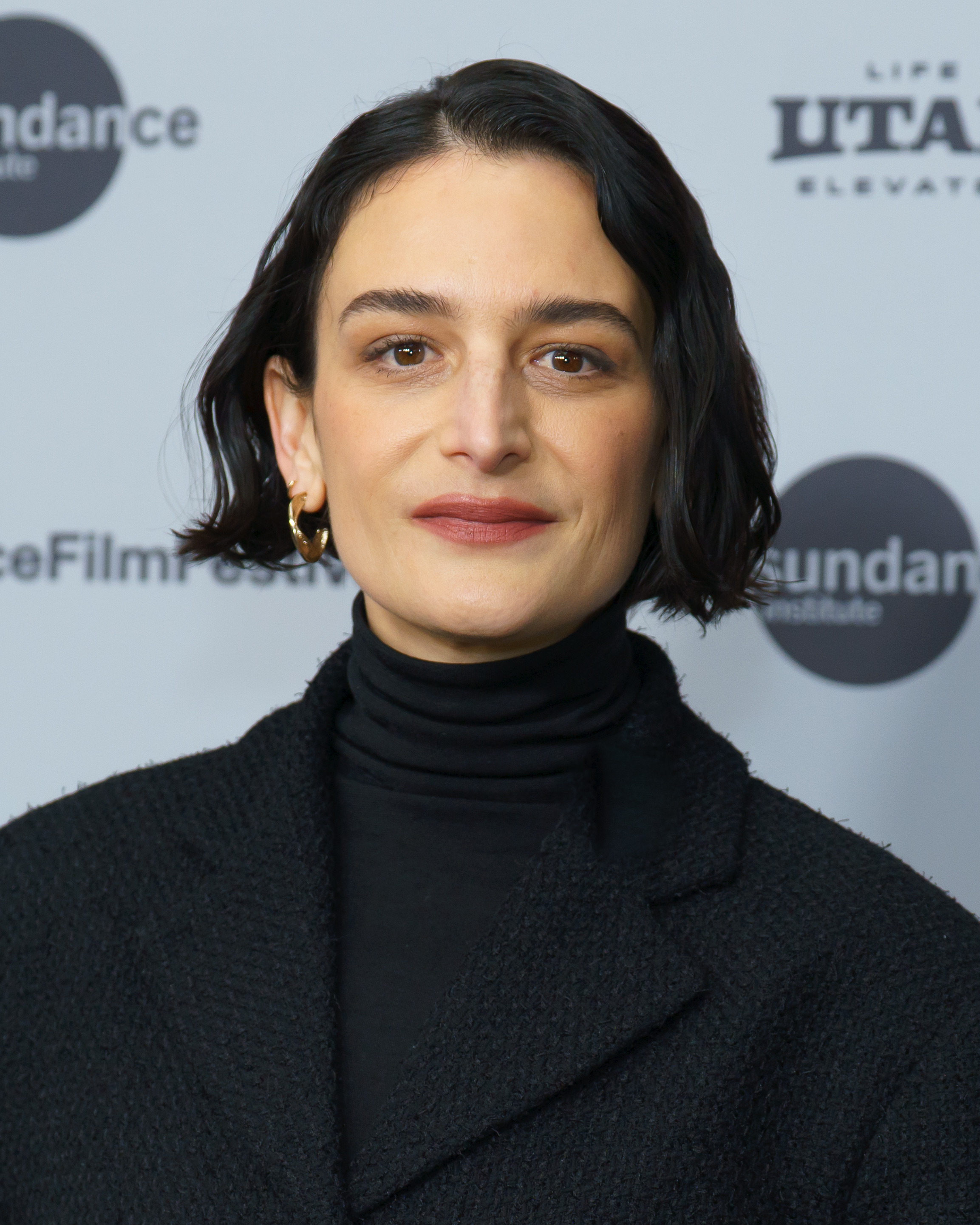
- Slate at the 2026 Sundance Film Festival Carousel premiere
- Born: March 25, 1982 (age 44); Milton, Massachusetts, U.S.
- Education: Columbia University (BA)
- Occupations: Actress; comedian; television writer
- Years active: 2005–present
- Spouses: Dean Fleischer Camp (m. 2012; div. 2016) Ben Shattuck (m. 2021)
- Children: 1

Jenny Slate (born March 25, 1982) is an American actress, stand-up comedian, and writer. After early acting and stand-up roles on television, Slate gained recognition for her live variety shows in New York City and for co-creating the children's short film and book series Marcel the Shell with Shoes On (2010–2014) with Dean Fleischer Camp, to whom she was married from 2012 to 2016. Slate became more widely known as a cast member on the 35th season of Saturday Night Live in 2009, followed by her roles in the sitcoms Bob's Burgers (2012–present), Parks and Recreation (2013–2015), House of Lies (2013–2015), and Kroll Show (2013–2015). She also had a supporting role in the film It Ends with Us (2024).

Slate's breakout role came with her leading performance in Gillian Robespierre's coming-of-age dramedy film Obvious Child (2014), for which she won the Critics' Choice Movie Award for Best Actress in a Comedy. She lent her voice to the animated films The Lorax (2012), Zootopia, The Secret Life of Pets (both 2016), The Lego Batman Movie, Despicable Me 3 (both 2017), The Secret Life of Pets 2 (2019), and Zootopia 2 (2025) and ventured into dramatic roles with her supporting performance in Gifted (2017). Slate appeared in the Daniels' Everything Everywhere All at Once (2022), winning the Screen Actors Guild Award for Outstanding Performance by a Cast in a Motion Picture.

== Early life and education ==
Slate was born on March 25, 1982, in Milton, Massachusetts, to Nancy (née Gilson) and Ronald "Ron" Slate, and has two sisters. She and her family are Jewish. After graduating from Milton Academy as valedictorian, Slate attended Columbia University as a literature major, where she helped form the improv group Fruit Paunch, starred in the Varsity Show, and met Gabe Liedman, who later was her comedy partner. Slate graduated from Columbia University in 2004.

== Career ==
She and Liedman formed the comedy duo Gabe & Jenny. Their stand-up shows with Max Silvestri, "Big Terrific", were named best new variety show of 2008 by Time Out New York. In 2015, Slate, Liedman, and Silvestri ended the show, citing their busy schedules, although they have since occasionally performed together. Slate first met Liedman in 2000 while attending Columbia University. They describe their relationship as a "nonsexual romance"; Slate says, "I like to think of us as kind of like (Seinfeld characters) Elaine Benes and George Costanza, but we like each other." Throughout 2008 and 2009, Slate regularly performed her one-woman show Jenny Slate: Dead Millionaire at the Upright Citizens Brigade Theatre (UCBT) in New York City.

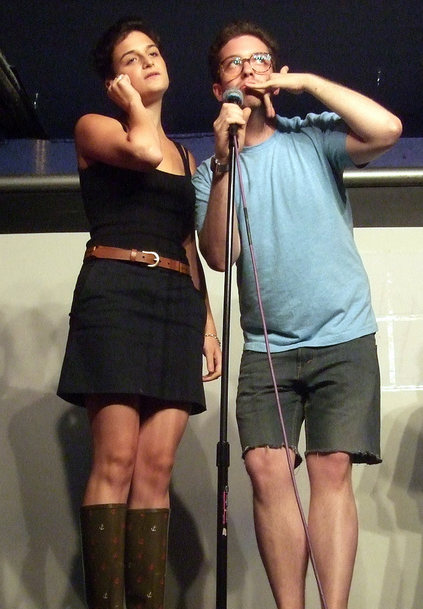
Slate with comedy partner Gabe Liedman, July 2007

Slate was a regular commentator on many VH1 "talking head" programs with commentary. In early 2009, she made several appearances on the Late Night with Jimmy Fallon recurring sketch "7th Floor West", where she played an NBC page, later promoted to Fallon's assistant. She had a recurring role in Bored to Death, and guest appearances on several television programs.

Slate joined the cast of Saturday Night Live for the 2009–10 season. In her first episode, she accidentally said "fucking" during her debut sketch, which was heard on the live broadcast, but removed from reruns. Amongst various impressions, she was best known for Tina-Tina Cheneuse, an infomercial pitcher who advertises personalized doorbells, car horns, and alarm clocks. Despite rumors to the contrary, Slate has insisted that her SNL termination was not due to cursing but rather simply because "I didn't click."

In August 2010, she co-wrote and voiced the animated short film Marcel the Shell with Shoes On. This led to Marcel the Shell with Shoes on, Two. Slate also wrote a "Marcel"-themed children's book that was released on November 1, 2011. Her first live film role was as Zoe in Alvin and the Chipmunks: Chipwrecked; more films followed in 2012, including the voice of Ted's mother in The Lorax. Her first appearance in Parks and Recreation was in the 2013 episode "Bailout", in which she portrayed Mona-Lisa Saperstein. Then, Slate released her own 12-episode mini-series on YouTube called Catherine, celebrating late 1980s and early 1990s soap-opera aesthetics.

In 2014, Slate starred in the comedy-drama film Obvious Child, which follows the life of a young stand-up comic as she grapples with an unplanned pregnancy and eventual abortion. Slate won the Critics Choice Award for Best Actress in a Comedy, Best Breakout Performance at the Newport Beach Film Festival, the Virtuosos Award at the Santa Barbara International Film Festival, and Best Comedic Actress at the Women Film Critics Circle Awards for her performance in the film. She co-starred with Judy Greer and Nat Faxon in the first season of the FX series Married. Slate still appeared in a few episodes after season one. Sarah Burns took her place in the series.

Slate appeared as Liz B. in the recurring "PubLIZity" sketches in Kroll Show, as well as many other recurring and one-off characters, performing in some capacity in almost every episode until the series ended in 2015. In 2016, Slate voiced antagonist Dawn Bellwether in the Disney film Zootopia and Gidget in The Secret Life of Pets. She and her father co-wrote a book titled About the House, about their time living in Slate's childhood home in Milton, Massachusetts, which was published in December 2016.

From 2017 until 2019, Slate voiced the biracial character Missy Foreman-Greenwald on the animated Netflix series Big Mouth. Slate exited the role on June 24, 2020, writing on Instagram that "At the start of the show, I reasoned with myself that it was permissible for me to play Missy because her mom is Jewish and white—as am I. But Missy is also Black and Black characters on an animated show should be played by Black people." In 2017, Slate starred in the film Gifted as Bonnie Stevenson, the teacher of a 7-year-old mathematical genius. In October 2019, she released a stand-up comedy special on Netflix, titled Stage Fright.

Slate published her book titled Little Weirds, about her struggles with and thoughts about life and relationships, in 2019. In 2022, she appeared in the critically acclaimed science fiction film Everything Everywhere All at Once as Big Nose. Her character's original name was changed to Debbie the Dog Mom for the film's digital release due to its association with Jewish stereotypes. For their performance the cast won the Screen Actors Guild Award for Outstanding Performance by a Cast in a Motion Picture.

== Personal life ==
Slate lived in Cobble Hill, Brooklyn, before moving with filmmaker Dean Fleischer Camp to Los Angeles in the early 2010s. In September 2012, Slate married Fleischer Camp. They collaborated on the Marcel the Shell with Shoes On franchise, including the books, the short films, and later, the 2021 feature film. The pair announced their separation in May 2016. Slate started dating actor Chris Evans a couple of months later.

In September 2019, Slate announced she and art curator and author Ben Shattuck, owner of the Davolls General Store in Dartmouth, Massachusetts, were engaged. On February 3, 2021, Slate announced that she had given birth to a daughter in late 2020. After three attempts at a wedding were canceled during the COVID-19 pandemic, she and Shattuck married in their living room on New Year's Eve 2021. They planned to move back to Brooklyn in the fall of 2025. They had been living in Shattuck's childhood home in Dartmouth, and his parents lived down the street from them.

Slate is an agnostic.

== Filmography ==
Key
†	Denotes works that have not yet been released

=== Film ===
Year	Title	Role	Notes
2010	Marcel the Shell with Shoes On	Marcel (voice)	Short film; also writer
2011	Marcel the Shell with Shoes On, Two	Marcel (voice)	Short film; also writer
2011	Alvin and the Chipmunks: Chipwrecked	Zoe	
2012	This Means War	Emily	
2012	The Lorax	Mrs. Wiggins (voice)	
2013	Bitch	Molly Horner	Short film
2014	Obvious Child	Donna Stern	Also executive producer
2014	The Longest Week	Jocelyn	
2014	Marcel the Shell with Shoes On, Three	Marcel (voice)	Short film; also writer
2015	Digging for Fire	Yoga Couple	
2016	Joshy	Jodi	
2016	Zootopia	Dawn Bellwether (voice)	
2016	My Blind Brother	Rose	
2016	The Secret Life of Pets	Gidget (voice)	
2016	Zoolander: Super Model	Nani (voice)	Television film
2016	Brain on Fire	Margo	
2017	Landline	Dana Jacobs	Also executive producer
2017	The Polka King	Marla Lewan	
2017	The Lego Batman Movie	Harley Quinn (voice)	
2017	Gifted	Bonnie Stevenson	
2017	Aardvark	Emily Milburton	
2017	Batman is Just Not That Into You	Harley Quinn (voice)	Short film
2017	Despicable Me 3	Valerie Da Vinci (voice)	Cameo
2018	Hotel Artemis	Morgan Daniels	
2018	Venom	Dr. Dora Skirth	
2019	The Sunlit Night	Frances	Also producer
2019	The Secret Life of Pets 2	Gidget (voice)	
2019	Super Gidget	Gidget (voice)	Short film
2020	On the Rocks	Vanessa	
2021	Marcel the Shell with Shoes On	Marcel (voice)	Also writer and producer
2022	I Want You Back	Emma	
2022	Everything Everywhere All at Once	Debbie the Dog Mom (Note: Character was initially named "Big Nose" but was renamed in the digital release of the film due to it being a negative Jewish stereotype.)	
2022	The Bob's Burgers Movie	Tammy Larsen (voice)	
2024	It Ends with Us	Allysa	
2025	The Electric State	Penny Pal (voice)	
2025	Zootopia 2	Dawn Bellwether (voice)	
2026	Carousel	Rebecca	
2026	At the Sea	Debbie	
2026	Forgotten Island	Batiba (Voice)	
TBA	The Ark and the Aardvark †	Mitzi (voice)	Post-production

=== Television ===
Year	Title	Role	Notes
2005	Starved	Member of Belt Tighteners	Uncredited; Episode: "The Breatharians"
2008	The Whitest Kids U' Know	Trevor's Date	Episode #2.1
2009	Important Things with Demetri Martin	Bride	Episode: "Chairs"
2009	Late Night with Jimmy Fallon	Jenny the Page	8 episodes
2009	Brothers	Annette	2 episodes
2009–2010	Saturday Night Live	Various	22 episodes
2009–2010	Bored to Death	Stella	5 episodes
2011	Ugly Americans	Jaclyn (voice)	Episode: "Lily and the Beast"
2011	The Electric Company	Runner	Episode: "Off Target"
2012	Raising Hope	Joan	2 episodes
2012–2016	Girls	Tally Schifrin	2 episodes
2012–present	Bob's Burgers	Tammy Larsen (voice)	58 episodes
2013	Hello Ladies	Amelia Gordon	4 episodes
2013–2015	Kroll Show	Various	14 episodes
2013–2015	Parks and Recreation	Mona-Lisa Saperstein	9 episodes
2013–2016	House of Lies	Sarah Guggenheim	11 episodes
2013–2016	Drunk History	Herself	3 episodes
2014	Brooklyn Nine-Nine	Bianca	Episode: "Undercover"
2014–2015	Married	Jess	14 episodes
2015–2019	Star vs. the Forces of Evil	Pony Head (voice)	25 episodes
2016	David: Story of David	Elizabeth	Web series
2016	Animals	Snake (voice)	Episode: "Squirrels. Part I."
2016–2017	Lady Dynamite	Karen Grisham	4 episodes
2016–2018	Adventure Time	Huntress Wizard (voice)	3 episodes
2017	Comrade Detective	Jane (voice)	6 episodes
2017–2025	Big Mouth	Missy Foreman-Greenwald (2017–20), other characters (voice)	53 episodes
2018	Clarence	Pipi, Cookie Mama Cashier, Beatrice (voice)	Episode: "Belson Gets a Girlfriend"
2018–2022	Muppet Babies	Miss Nanny (voice)	69 episodes
2019	The Simpsons	Piper Paisley (voice)	Episode: "Crystal Blue-Haired Persuasion"
2019	The Unauthorized Bash Brothers Experience	Stacy	Television special
2019	Jenny Slate: Stage Fright	Herself	Stand-up special
2020	Elena of Avalor	Cahu (voice)	Episode: "Coronation Day"
2021	Q-Force	(voice)	Episode: "Rogue"
2021–2025	The Great North	Judy Tobin (voice)	Series regular
2023	Adventure Time: Fionna and Cake	Huntress (voice)	Episode: "The Star"
2024	Jenny Slate: Seasoned Professional	Herself	Stand-up special
2025	Dying for Sex	Nikki	Miniseries; 8 episodes

=== Music videos ===
Year	Title	Artist(s)	Role
2009	"Threw It On the Ground"	The Lonely Island	Girlfriend
2019	"Oakland Nights"	The Lonely Island (feat. Sia)	Stacy

=== Podcasts ===
Year	Title	Role	Notes
2019	Earth Break	Lynn Gellert	9 episodes

== Awards and nominations ==
Association	Year	Category	Work	Result	Ref.
Annie Award	2020	Outstanding Voice Acting in a Feature	The Secret Life of Pets 2	Nominated	
Annie Award	2023	Outstanding Voice Acting in a Feature	Marcel the Shell with Shoes On	Won	
Astra TV Awards	2025	Best Supporting Actress in a Limited Series or TV Movie	Dying for Sex	Nominated	
Astra TV Awards	2025	Best Cast Ensemble in a Limited Series or TV Movie	Dying for Sex	Nominated	
Austin Film Critics Association	2023	Best Voice Acting/Animated/Digital Performance	Marcel the Shell	Won	
Chicago Film Critics Association	2014	Most Promising Performer	Obvious Child	Nominated	
Critics' Choice Movie Award	2014	Best Actress in a Comedy	Obvious Child	Won	
Georgia Film Critics Association	2015	Breakthrough Award	Obvious Child	Nominated	
Gotham Independent Film Award	2014	Breakthrough Actress	Obvious Child	Nominated	
Gotham TV Awards	2025	Outstanding Supporting Performance in a Limited Series	Dying for Sex	Won	
Independent Spirit Award	2014	Best Female Lead	Obvious Child	Nominated	
Independent Spirit Award	2026	Best Supporting Performance in a New Scripted Series	Dying for Sex	Nominated	
BTVA People's Choice Voice Acting Award	2016	Best Supporting Female Vocal Performance - Feature Film	Zootopia	Won	
BTVA People's Choice Voice Acting Award	2016	Best Vocal Ensemble in a Feature Film (shared with cast)	Zootopia	Nominated	
BTVA People's Choice Voice Acting Award	2016	Best Female Lead Vocal Performance in a Feature Film	The Secret Life of Pets	Nominated	
BTVA People's Choice Voice Acting Award	2017	Best Supporting Female Vocal Performance - Television Series	Star vs. the Forces of Evil	Nominated	
BTVA People's Choice Voice Acting Award	2018	Best Vocal Ensemble in a Feature Film (shared with cast)	Despicable Me 3 and The Lego Batman Movie	Nominated	
Primetime Emmy Award	2025	Outstanding Supporting Actress in a Limited Series or Movie	Dying for Sex	Nominated	
Santa Barbara International Film Festival	2014	Virtuoso Award	Obvious Child	Won	
Screen Actors Guild Award	2018	Outstanding Cast in a Motion Picture	Everything Everywhere All at Once	Won	
Seattle International Film Festival	2014	Best Actress	Obvious Child	Nominated	
Women Film Critics Circle	2014	Best Comedic Actress	Obvious Child	Won	
Women Film Critics Circle	2014	Best Screen Couple (with Jake Lacy)	Obvious Child	Nominated	
Washington DC Area Film Critics Association Awards	2023	Best Voice Performance	Marcel the Shell	Won	

== Bibliography ==
- Slate, Jenny; Fleischer-Camp, Dean (2011). Marcel the Shell with Shoes On: Things About Me. Razorbill. ISBN 978-1-59514-455-3.
- Slate, Jenny; Fleischer-Camp, Dean (2014). Marcel the Shell: The Most Surprised I've Ever Been. Razorbill. ISBN 978-1-59514-456-0.
- Slate, Jenny; Slate, Ron (2016). About the House. Concord Free Press. ISBN 9780990805922.
- Slate, Jenny (2019). Little Weirds. Little, Brown and Company (published November 5, 2019). ISBN 978-0-316-48534-0.
- Slate, Jenny (2024). Lifeform. Little, Brown and Company (published October 22, 2024). ISBN 9780316263931.
