= List of accolades received by Kubo and the Two Strings =

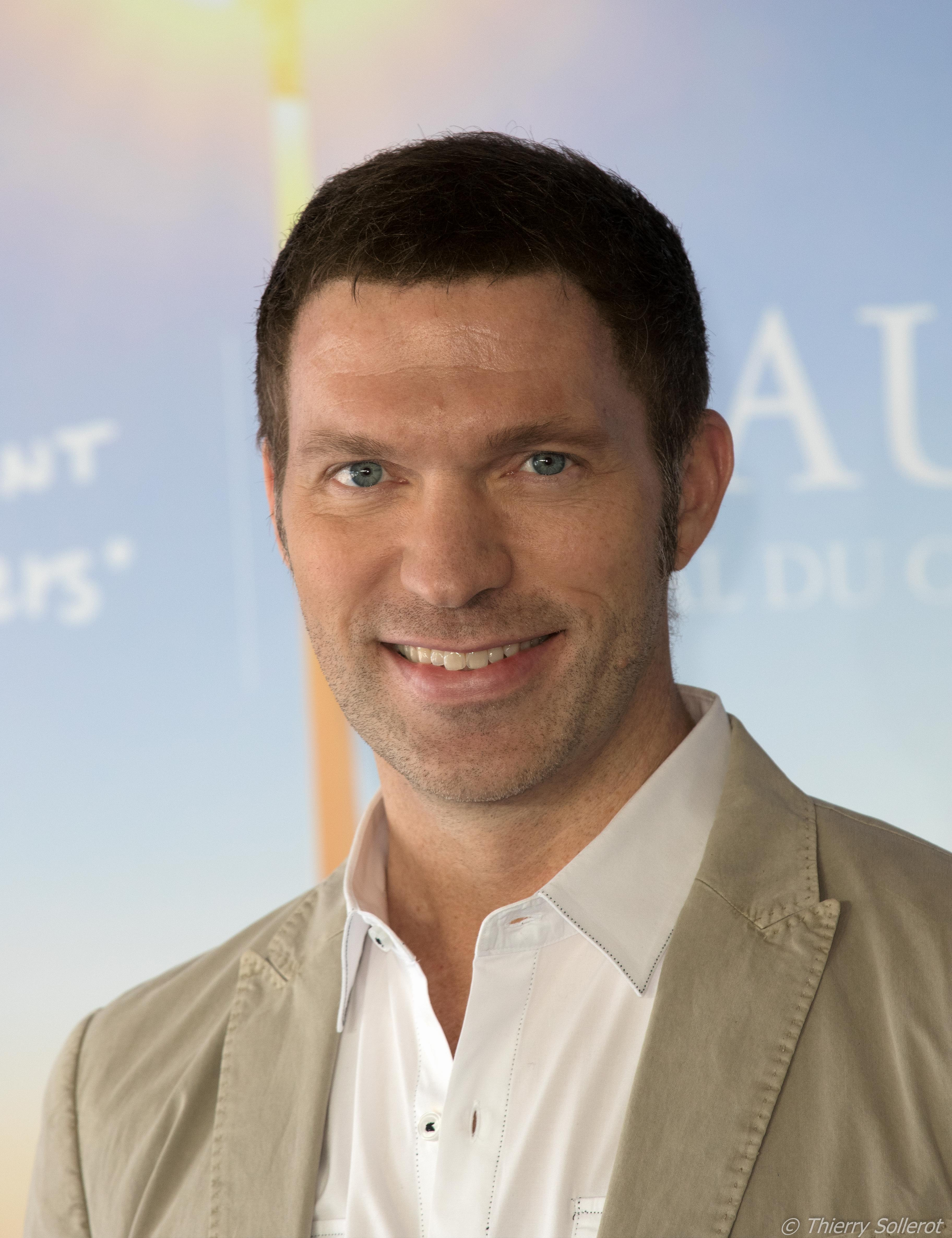
Travis Knight directed Kubo and the Two Strings.

Kubo and the Two Strings is a 2016 American stop-motion action-adventure film directed by Travis Knight and produced by Laika. The screenplay, written by Marc Haimes and Chris Butler, revolves around Kubo, a 12-year-old boy with an eyepatch. Kubo's left eye was stolen in infancy, and he must subdue his corrupt family members now coming to get the other eye. The film features the voices of Charlize Theron, Art Parkinson, Ralph Fiennes, Rooney Mara, George Takei, and Matthew McConaughey.

The film premiered at the Melbourne International Film Festival on August 13, 2016. Focus Features released it theatrically on September 9. Worldwide, the film grossed nearly $70 million on a $60 million budget. On the review aggregator Rotten Tomatoes, Kubo and the Two Strings holds a rating of 97%, based on 192 reviews, with an average rating of 8.4/10.

Kubo and the Two Strings garnered awards and nominations in a general animated film category at several award ceremonies. At the 89th Academy Awards, it was nominated in the categories Best Animated Feature and Best Visual Effects; it was the second animated film to be nominated in the latter category, following The Nightmare Before Christmas (1993). It was nominated for Best Animated Feature Film at the 74th Golden Globe Awards and Best Animated Feature at the 22nd Critics' Choice Awards. The film received the second-most nominations at the 44th Annie Awards, one fewer than Zootopia's 11, and won Outstanding Achievement in Character Animation, Production Design, and Editorial in an Animated Feature Production, with seven other nominations.

Kubo and the Two Strings was named best animated feature film at the 12th Austin Film Critics Association Awards, the 29th Chicago Film Critics Association Awards, the 70th British Academy Film Awards, the 21st Florida Film Critics Circle Awards, the 10th Houston Film Critics Society Awards, the 88th National Board of Review Awards, the 20th Online Film Critics Society Awards, the 21st San Diego Film Critics Society Awards, and the 15th Washington D.C. Area Film Critics Association Awards.

== Accolades ==
Award	Date of ceremony	Category	Recipients	Result	Ref.
AARP Annual Movies for Grownups Awards	February 6, 2017	Best Movie for Grownups who Refuse to Grow Up	Kubo and the Two Strings	Won	
Academy Awards	February 26, 2017	Best Animated Feature	Travis Knight and Arianne Sutner	Nominated	
Academy Awards	February 26, 2017	Best Visual Effects	Steve Emerson, Oliver Jones, Brian McLean and Brad Schiff	Nominated	
ACE Eddie Awards	January 27, 2017	Best Edited Animated Feature Film	Christopher Murrie	Nominated	
Alliance of Women Film Journalists	December 21, 2016	Best Animated Film	Travis Knight	Nominated	
Annie Awards	February 4, 2017	Best Animated Feature	Kubo and the Two Strings	Nominated	
Annie Awards	February 4, 2017	Outstanding Achievement, Animated Effects in an Animated Production	David Horsley, Eric Wachtman, Timur Khodzhaev, Daniel Leatherdale and Terrance Tomberg	Nominated	
Annie Awards	February 4, 2017	Outstanding Achievement, Character Animation in a Feature Production	Jan Maas	Won	
Annie Awards	February 4, 2017	Outstanding Achievement, Character Design in an Animated Feature Production	Shannon Tindle	Nominated	
Annie Awards	February 4, 2017	Outstanding Achievement, Directing in an Animated Feature Production	Travis Knight	Nominated	
Annie Awards	February 4, 2017	Outstanding Achievement, Production Design in an Animated Feature Production	Nelson Lowry, Trevor Dalmer, August Hall and Ean McNamara	Won	
Annie Awards	February 4, 2017	Outstanding Achievement, Storyboarding in an Animated Feature Production	Mark Garcia	Nominated	
Annie Awards	February 4, 2017	Outstanding Achievement, Voice Acting in an Animated Feature Production	Art Parkinson	Nominated	
Annie Awards	February 4, 2017	Outstanding Achievement, Writing in an Animated Feature Production	Marc Haimes and Chris Butler	Nominated	
Annie Awards	February 4, 2017	Outstanding Achievement, Editorial in an Animated Feature Production	Christopher Murrie	Won	
Austin Film Critics Association	December 28, 2016	Best Animated Film	Kubo and the Two Strings	Won	
British Academy Film Awards	February 12, 2017	Best Animated Film	Travis Knight	Won	
British Academy Children's Awards	November 26, 2017	Feature Film	Travis Knight, Arianne Sutner	Nominated	
Chicago Film Critics Association	December 15, 2016	Best Animated Film	Kubo and the Two Strings	Won	
Chicago Film Critics Association	December 15, 2016	Most Promising Filmmaker	Travis Knight	Nominated	
Cinema Audio Society	February 18, 2017	Outstanding Achievement in Sound Mixing for a Motion Picture – Animated	Tim Chau, Tim LeBlanc, Darrin Mann, Carlos Sotolongo and Nick Wollage	Nominated	
Columbus Film Critics Association Awards	January 5, 2017	Columbus Film Critics Association Awards for Best Animated Feature	Kubo and the Two Strings	Won	
Costume Designers Guild	February 21, 2017	Excellence in Fantasy Film	Deborah Cook	Nominated	
Critics' Choice Awards	December 11, 2016	Best Animated Feature	Kubo and the Two Strings	Nominated	
Dallas–Fort Worth Film Critics Association	December 13, 2016	Best Animated Film	Kubo and the Two Strings	Nominated	
Florida Film Critics Circle	December 23, 2016	Best Animated Film	Kubo and the Two Strings	Won	
Golden Globe Awards	January 8, 2017	Best Animated Feature Film	Kubo and the Two Strings	Nominated	
Golden Tomato Awards	January 12, 2017	Best Wide Release 2016	Kubo and the Two Strings	8th Place	
Golden Tomato Awards	January 12, 2017	Best Animated Movie 2016	Kubo and the Two Strings	3rd Place	
Houston Film Critics Society	January 6, 2017	Best Animated Feature Film	Kubo and the Two Strings	Won	
National Board of Review	January 4, 2017	Best Animated Film	Kubo and the Two Strings	Won	
New York Film Critics Online	December 11, 2016	Best Animated Film	Kubo and the Two Strings	Won	
Online Film Critics Society	January 3, 2017	Best Animated Feature	Kubo and the Two Strings	Won	
Producers Guild of America	January 28, 2017	Best Animated Motion Picture	Travis Knight and Arianne Sutner	Nominated	
Ray Bradbury Award	May 20, 2017	Outstanding Dramatic Presentation	Mark Haimes, Chris Butler and Travis Knight	Nominated	
San Diego Film Critics Society	December 12, 2016	Best Animated Film	Kubo and the Two Strings	Won	
San Francisco Film Critics Circle	December 11, 2016	Best Animated Feature	Kubo and the Two Strings	Nominated	
Satellite Awards	February 19, 2017	Best Animated or Mixed Media Feature	Kubo and the Two Strings	Nominated	
St. Louis Gateway Film Critics Association	December 18, 2016	Best Animated Film	Kubo and the Two Strings	Runner-up	
Toronto Film Critics Association	December 11, 2016	Best Animated Film	Travis Knight	Runner-up	
Village Voice Film Poll	January 6, 2017	Best Animated Feature	"Kubo and the Two Strings"	Won	
Visual Effects Society	February 7, 2017	Outstanding Visual Effects in an Animated Feature	Steve Emerson, Travis Knight, Brad Schiff and Arianne Sutner	Won	
Visual Effects Society	February 7, 2017	Outstanding Animated Performance in an Animated Feature	Kubo – Adam Lawthers, Jeff Riley, Jeremy Spake and Ian Whitlock	Nominated	
Visual Effects Society	February 7, 2017	Outstanding Animated Performance in an Animated Feature	Monkey – Andy Bailey, Jessica Lynn, Kim Slate and Dobrin Yanev	Nominated	
Visual Effects Society	February 7, 2017	Outstanding Created Environment in an Animated Feature	Hanzo's Fortress – Phil Brotherton, Emily Greene, Nick Mariana and Joe Strasser	Nominated	
Visual Effects Society	February 7, 2017	Outstanding Created Environment in an Animated Feature	Waves – David Horsley, Takashi Kuboto, Daniel Leatherdale and Eric Wachtman	Nominated	
Visual Effects Society	February 7, 2017	Outstanding Effects Simulations in an Animated Feature	Water – David Horsley, Timur Khodzhaev, Peter Stuary and Terrance Tornberg	Nominated	
Washington D.C. Area Film Critics Association	December 5, 2016	Best Animated Feature	Kubo and the Two Strings	Won	
Women Film Critics Circle	December 19, 2016	Best Family Film	Kubo and the Two Strings	Nominated	
