= Stephen Ellis (film editor) =

British film editor and film producer

Stephen Ellis is a British documentary film editor and producer. Best known for his work as an editor Fire in the Night, Syria: Children on the Frontline, The Tower: A Tale of Two Cities, Ronaldo and for producing Watani: My Homeland that earned him Academy Award for Best Documentary (Short Subject) nomination at 89th Academy Awards, with director Marcel Mettelsiefen.

== Awards and nominations ==
- Nominated: Academy Award for Best Documentary (Short Subject) - Watani: My Homeland
