= Walter Mair =

Austrian-born composer (born 1978)

- Birth name: Walter Christian Mair
- Born: 17 December 1978 (age 46); Vienna, Austria
- Occupation: Composer
- Website: www.waltermair.com

Walter Christian Mair (born 17 December 1978) is an Austrian-born composer.

== Biography ==
Mair has created scores for feature films, television drama, commercials, and narrative-driven interactive entertainment such as computer games.

Mair studied in Austria, earning a degree in music composition for orchestra from the University of Vienna and a major in music composition for motion pictures from Salzburg University.

He composed music for the Universal Pictures documentary feature Ronaldo, directed by Anthony Wonke. In 2016, Mair scored the music for Toby Tobias' thriller Blood Orange starring Ben Lamb and Iggy Pop. In television, he has written music for BBC 1's Cuffs and E4's teen drama mini-series Glue. He has also written music for Rockstar's Grand Theft Auto video games, Sony's sci-fi franchise Killzone, Tom Clancy's Splinter Cell: Conviction and The Creative Assembly's Total War series.

Mair writes in a wide range of styles, from large orchestral symphonic scores with choir down to smaller ensembles and also intersperses electronics and hybrid or bespoke sounds with live solo instruments.

Mair has written the music and created sound design for numerous commercials for television and cinema campaigns including for Range Rover, Audi, and Jaguar.

Mair works out of a recording studio in Soho, London and is represented by The Gorfaine/Schwartz Agency. He is a member of the British Academy of Film and Television Arts (BAFTA) and British Academy of Songwriters, Composers and Authors (BASCA).
