= 89th Academy Awards =

- Official poster
- Date: February 26, 2017
- Site: Dolby Theatre; Hollywood, Los Angeles, California, U.S.
- Hosted by: Jimmy Kimmel
- Preshow hosts: Jess Cagle; Robin Roberts; Lara Spencer; Michael Strahan; Nina García; Krista Smith
- Produced by: Michael De Luca; Jennifer Todd
- Directed by: Glenn Weiss

Highlights
- Best Picture: Moonlight
- Most awards: La La Land (6)
- Most nominations: La La Land (14)

TV in the United States
- Network: ABC
- Duration: 3 hours, 49 minutes
- Ratings: 32.9 million 22.4% (Nielsen ratings)

The 89th Academy Awards ceremony, presented by the Academy of Motion Picture Arts and Sciences (AMPAS), honored the best films of 2016, and took place on February 26, 2017, at the Dolby Theatre in Hollywood, Los Angeles, California, at 5:30 p.m. PST. During the ceremony, AMPAS presented Academy Awards (commonly referred to as Oscars) in 24 categories. The ceremony, televised in the United States by ABC, was produced by Michael De Luca and Jennifer Todd and directed by Glenn Weiss. Comedian Jimmy Kimmel hosted the ceremony for the first time.

Relatedly, the academy held its 8th Annual Governors Awards ceremony at the Grand Ballroom of the Hollywood and Highland Center on November 12, 2016. On November 25, 2016, the AMPAS announced that no anime shorts would be considered for this year's ceremony. On February 11, 2017, in a ceremony at the Beverly Wilshire Hotel in Beverly Hills, California, the Academy Scientific and Technical Awards were presented by hosts John Cho and Leslie Mann.

In the main ceremony, Moonlight won three awards including Best Picture—after La La Land was mistakenly announced as the winner—as well as Best Supporting Actor for Mahershala Ali. La La Land won six awards, the most for the evening, out of its record-tying 14 nominations, including Best Actress for Emma Stone and Best Director for Damien Chazelle. Hacksaw Ridge and Manchester by the Sea won two awards each with Casey Affleck winning Best Actor for the latter. Viola Davis won the Best Supporting Actress honor for Fences. The telecast was viewed by 32.9 million people in the United States.

== Winners and nominees ==
The nominees for the 89th Academy Awards were announced on January 24, 2017, via global live stream from the academy. La La Land received the most nominations with a record-tying fourteen (1950's All About Eve and 1997's Titanic also achieved this distinction); Arrival and Moonlight came in second with eight apiece. La La Land's Best Picture loss to Moonlight meant it set a record for most nominations without winning Best Picture. Four of the five nominations for Best Original Score were by first-time nominees, the highest figure since 1967.

The winners were announced during the awards ceremony on February 26, 2017. Moonlight became the first film with an all-black cast and the first LGBT-themed film to win Best Picture. In an event unprecedented in the history of the Oscars, La La Land was incorrectly announced as the Best Picture, and, a few minutes later, the error was corrected and Moonlight was declared the winner. O.J.: Made in America, at 467 minutes, became the longest film to win an Academy Award, surpassing the 431-minute long War and Peace, which won the Academy Award for Best Foreign Language Film in 1969. Following the five-part documentary's win, new academy rules barred any "multi-part or limited series" from being eligible for documentary categories. With Casey Affleck winning the Oscar for Best Actor, he and his older brother, Ben Affleck, became the 16th pair of siblings to win Academy Awards. Mahershala Ali became the first Muslim actor to win an Oscar. Viola Davis became the first black person to achieve the Triple Crown of Acting with her Oscar, Emmy, and Tony wins.

At the age of thirty-two years and thirty-eight days, Damien Chazelle became the youngest person to win Best Director; Norman Taurog was only two hundred and twenty-two days older than Chazelle when he won Best Director for the 1931 comedy Skippy. Kevin O'Connell ended the longest losing streak in Oscar history after 20 unsuccessful nominations for sound mixing, winning for Hacksaw Ridge. Moonlight's Dede Gardner became the first woman to win twice for producing, following her previous Best Picture win for 12 Years a Slave.

=== Awards ===
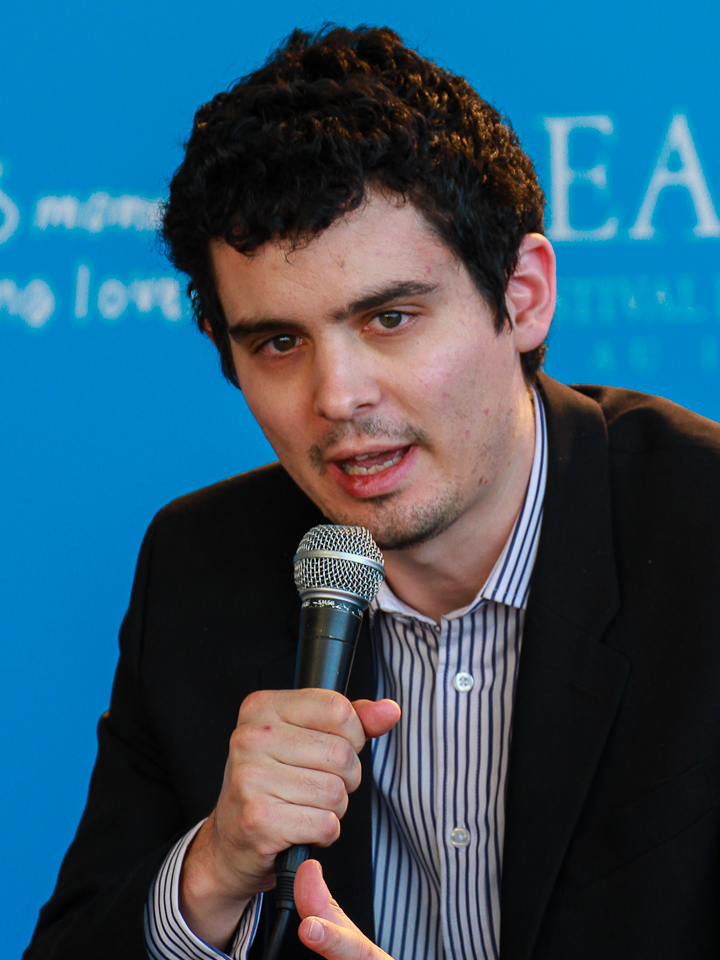
Damien Chazelle, Best Director winner

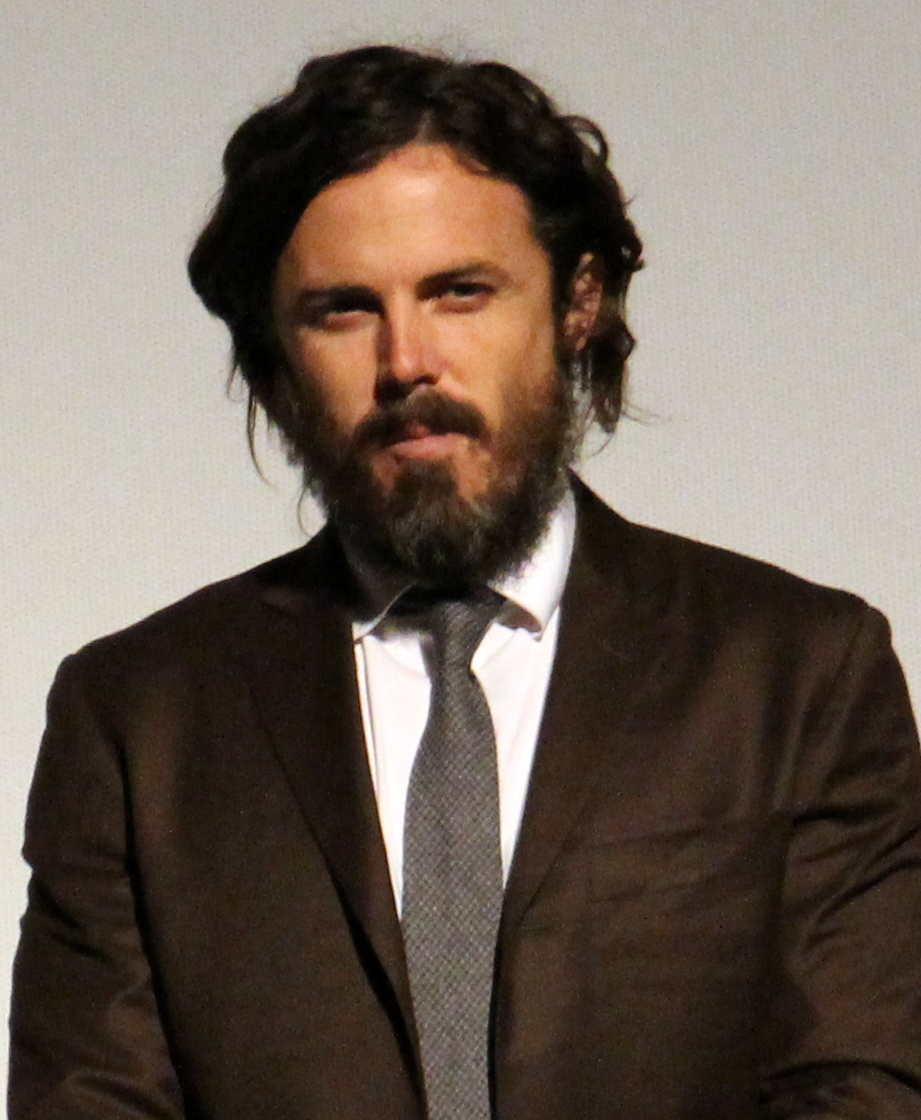
Casey Affleck, Best Actor winner

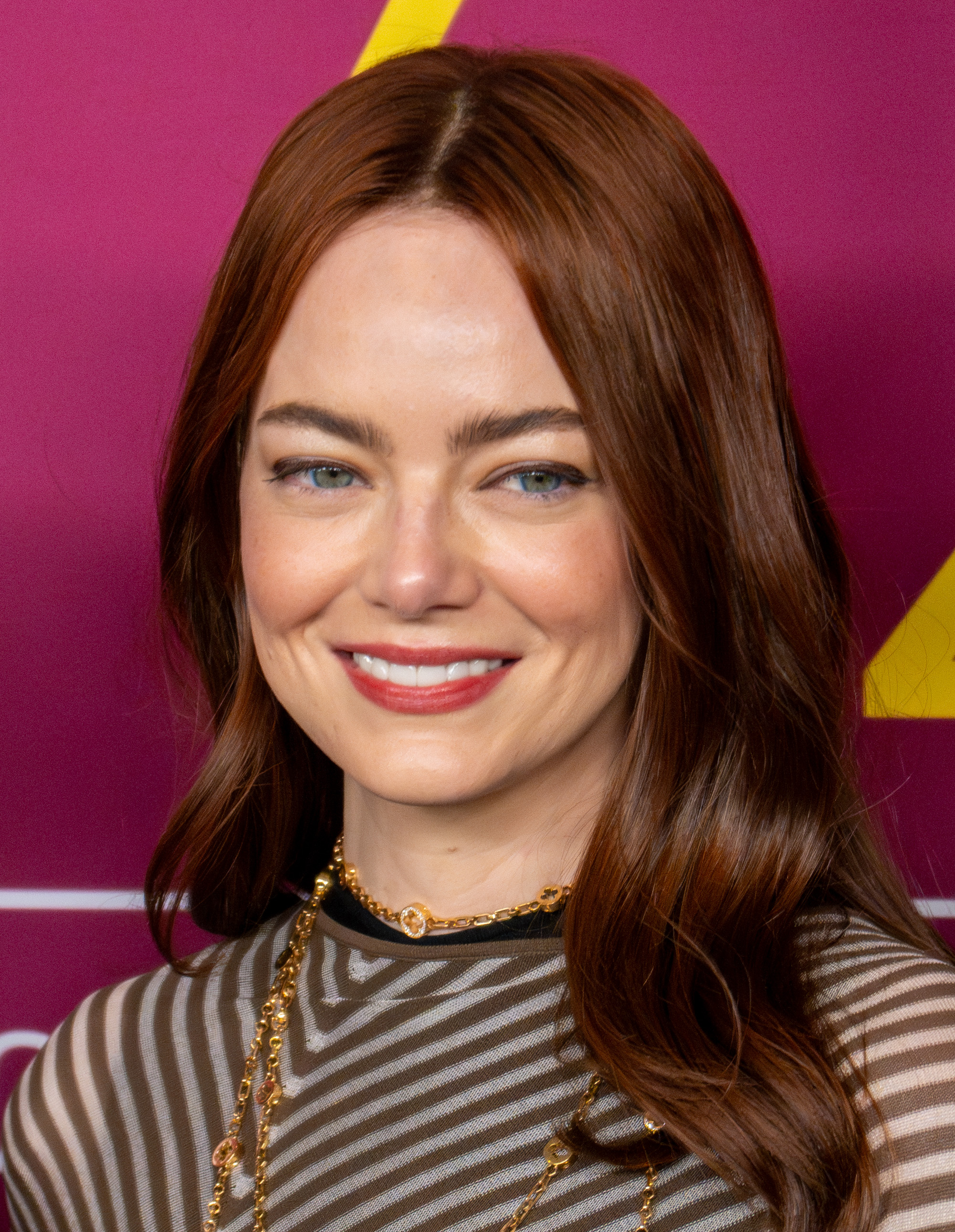
Emma Stone, Best Actress winner

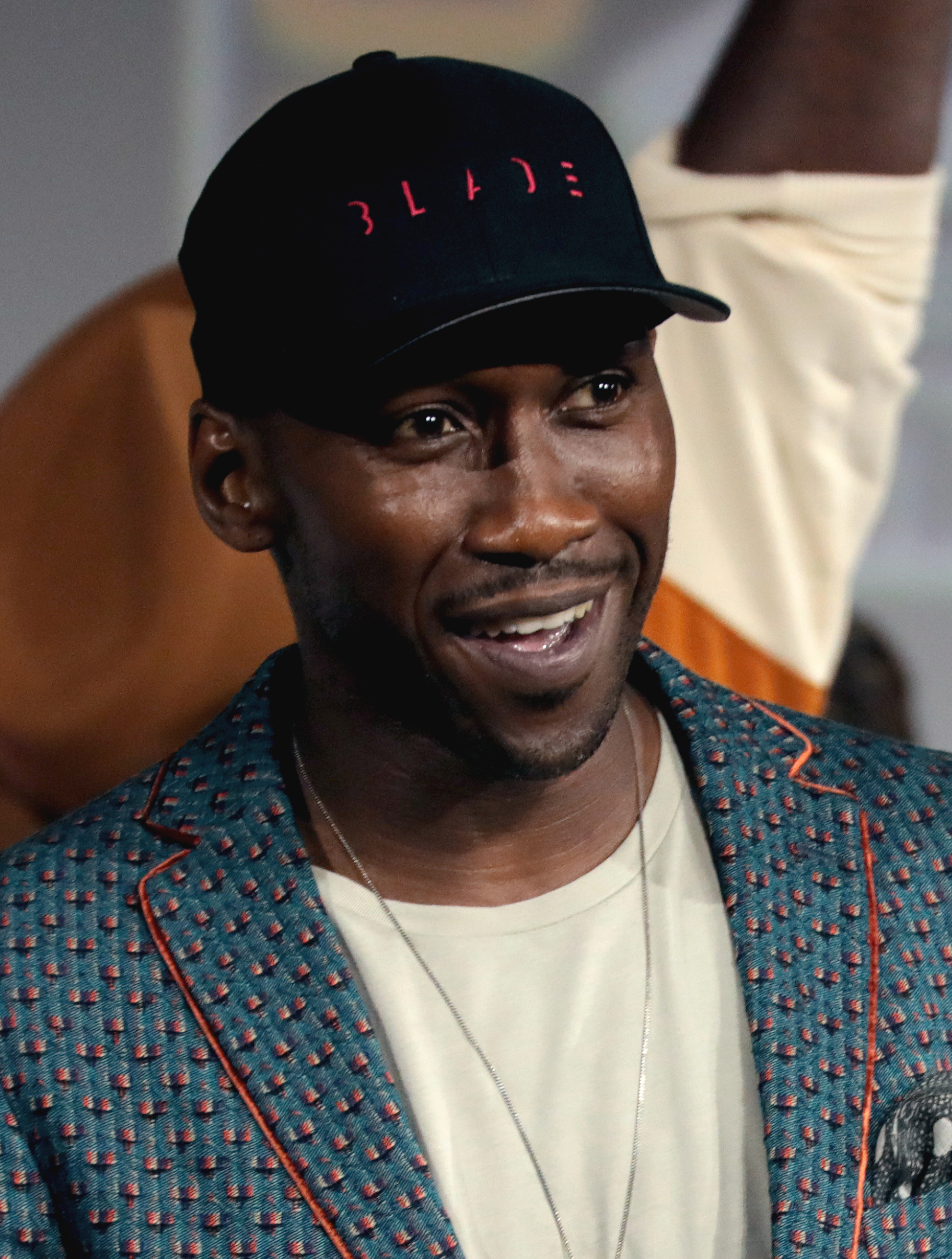
Mahershala Ali, Best Supporting Actor winner

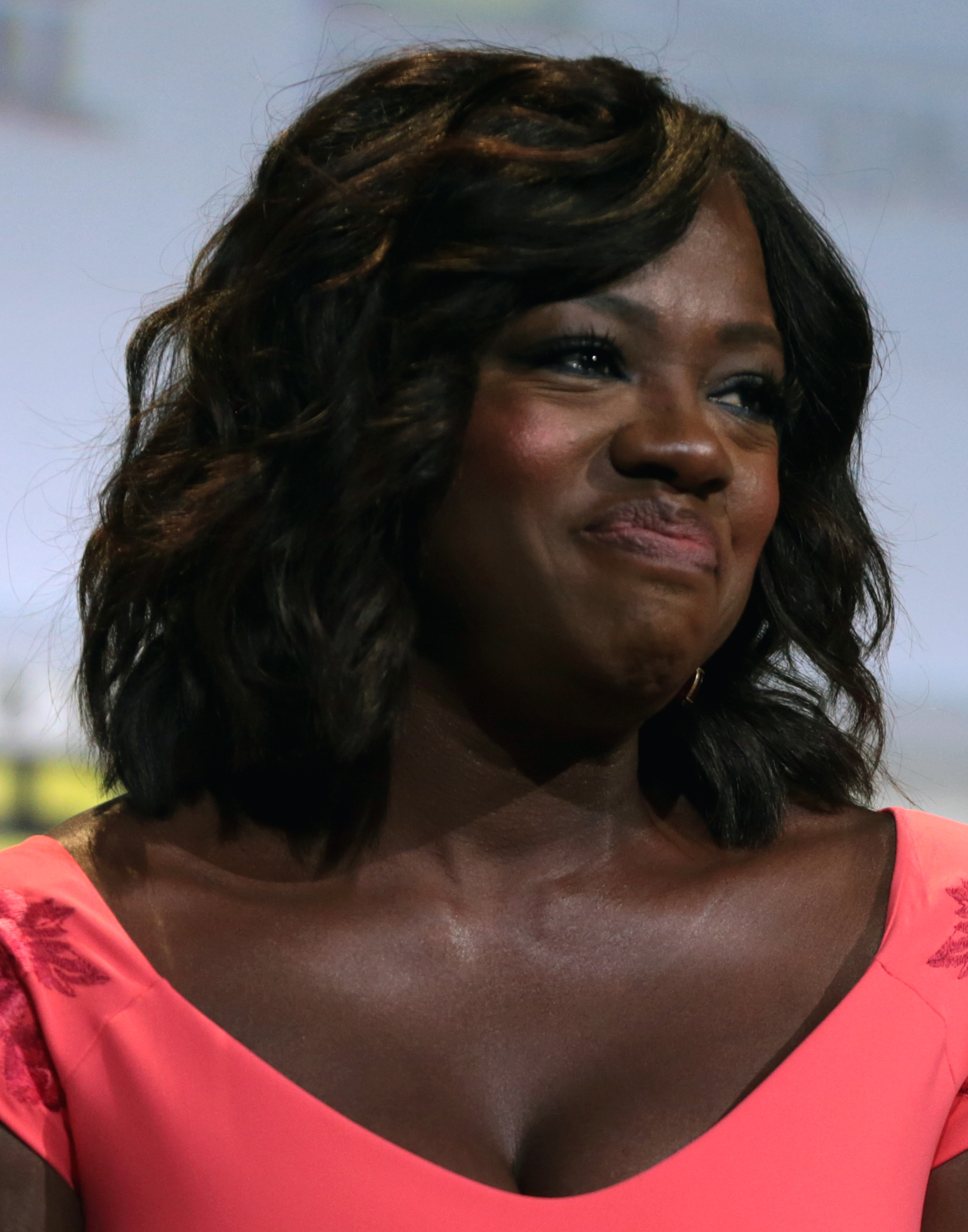
Viola Davis, Best Supporting Actress winner

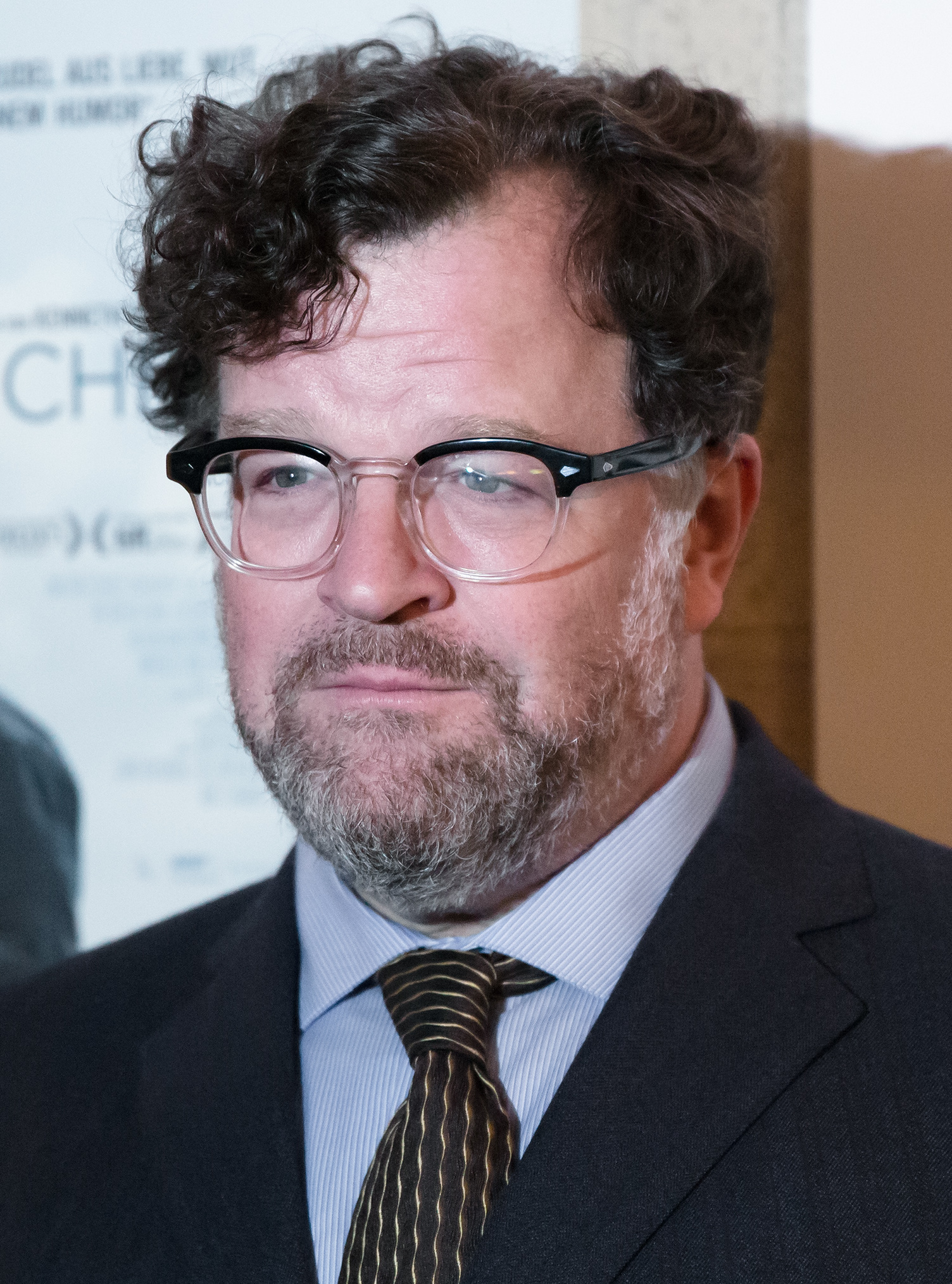
Kenneth Lonergan, Best Original Screenplay winner

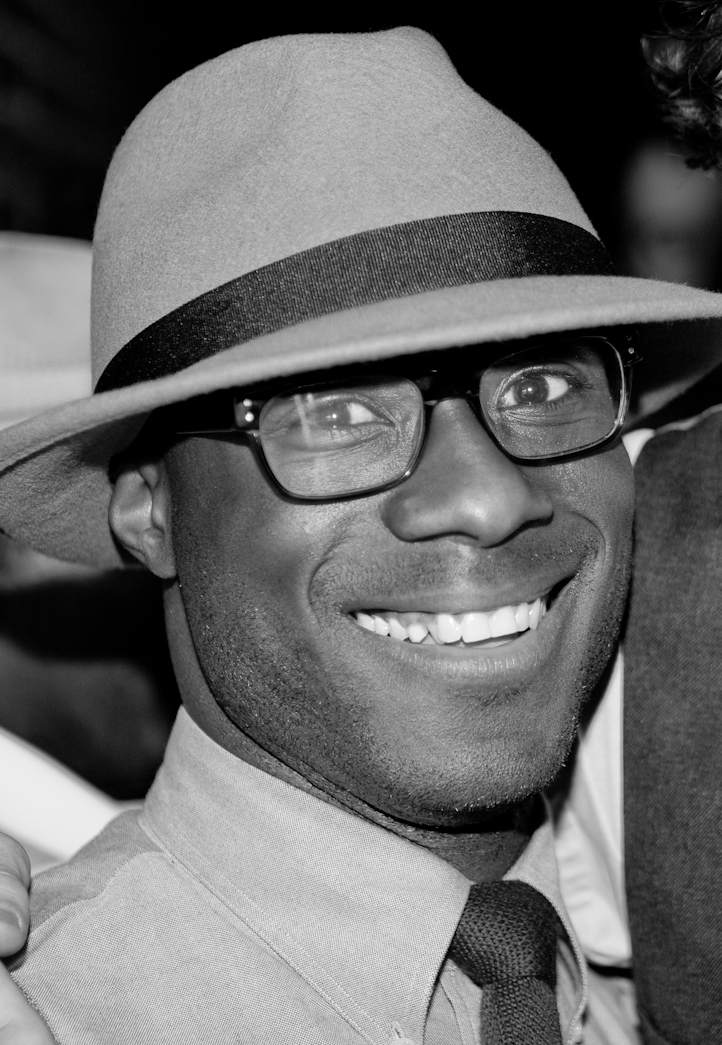
Barry Jenkins, Best Adapted Screenplay co-winner

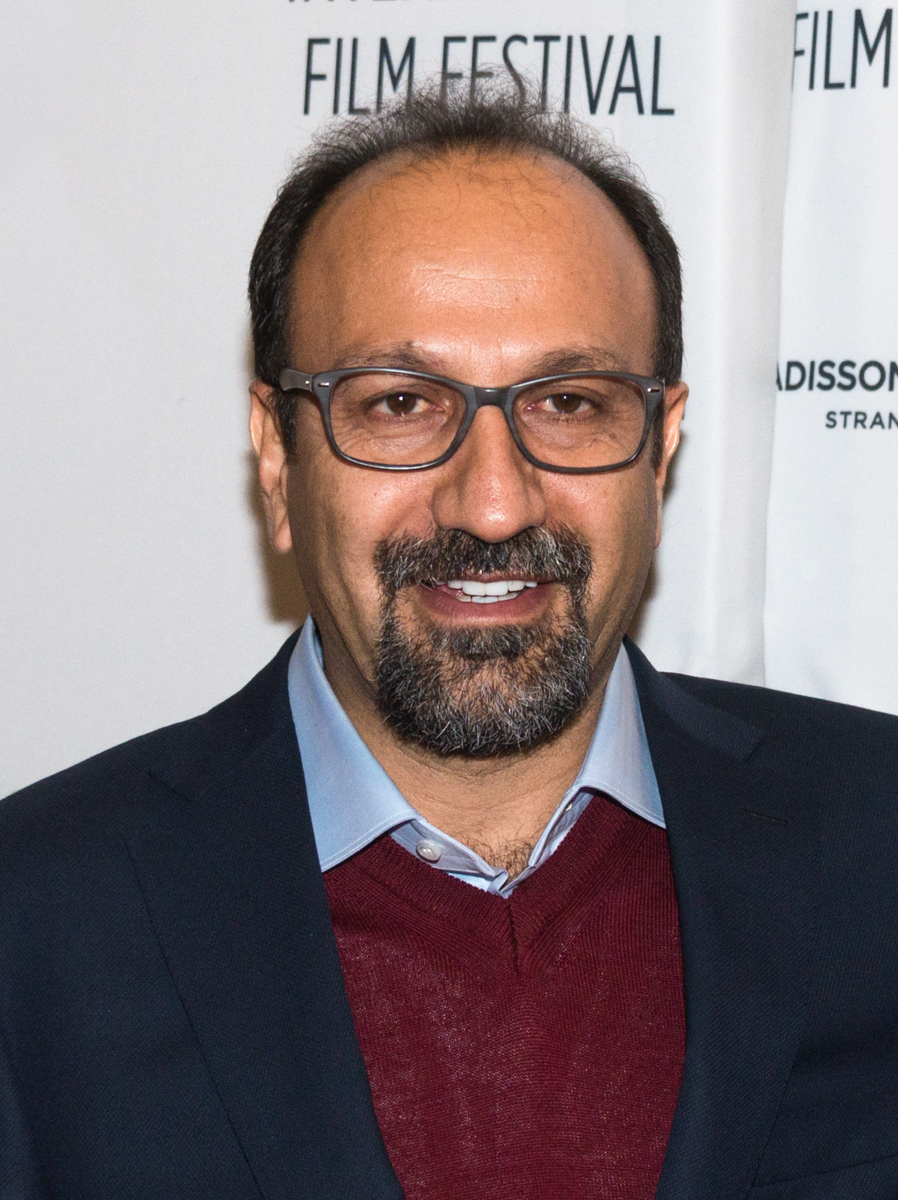
Asghar Farhadi, Best Foreign Language Film winner

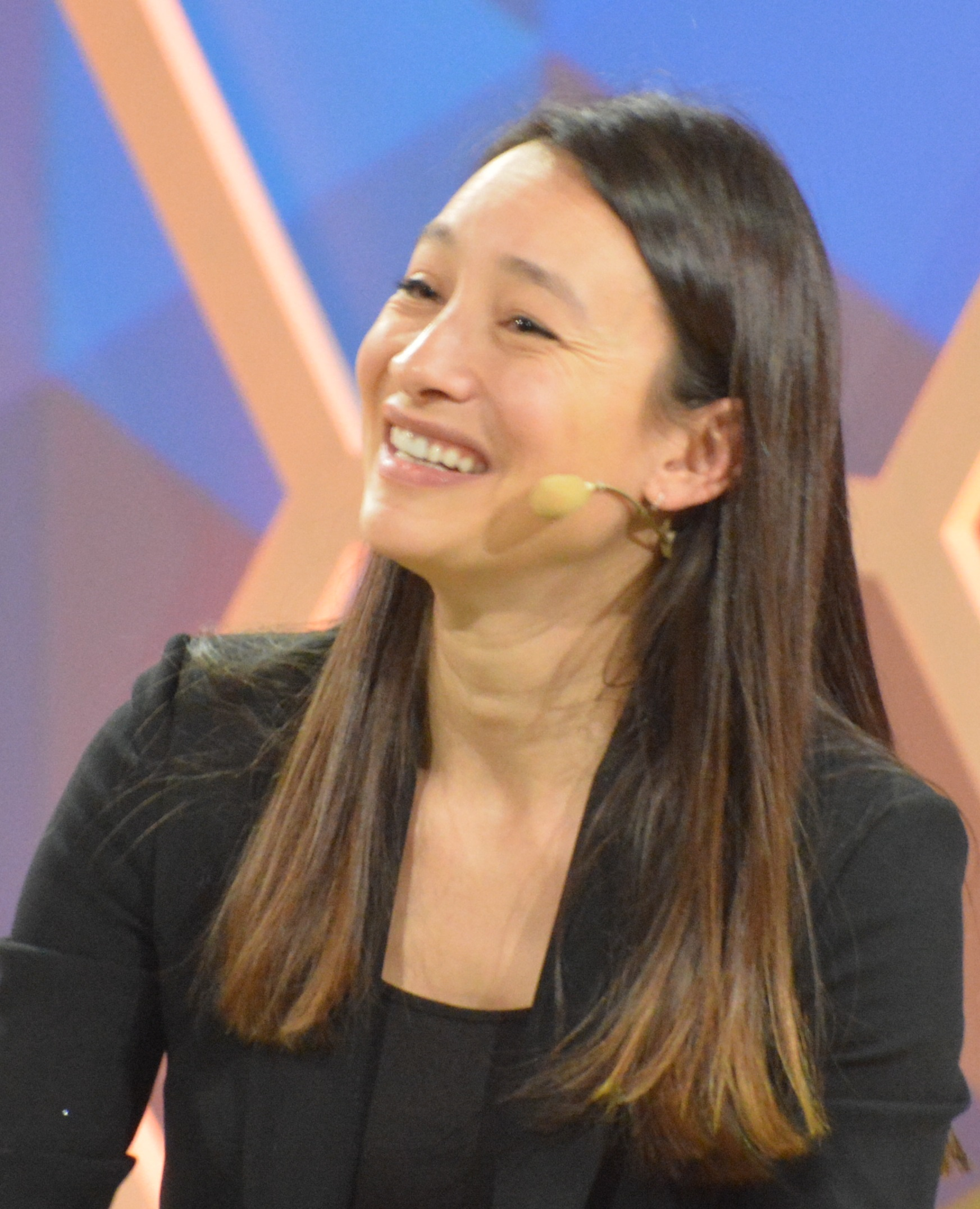
Joanna Natasegara, Best Documentary Short Subject co-winner

Winners are listed first, highlighted in boldface, and indicated with a double dagger (‡).

**Best Picture**: **Moonlight – Adele Romanski, Dede Gardner and Jeremy Kleiner**‡; Arrival – Shawn Levy, Dan Levine, Aaron Ryder and David Linde; Fences – Scott Rudin, Denzel Washington and Todd Black; Hacksaw Ridge – Bill Mechanic and David Permut; Hell or High Water – Carla Hacken and Julie Yorn; Hidden Figures – Donna Gigliotti, Peter Chernin, Jenno Topping, Pharrell Williams and Theodore Melfi; La La Land – Fred Berger, Jordan Horowitz and Marc Platt; Lion – Emile Sherman, Iain Canning and Angie Fielder; Manchester by the Sea – Matt Damon, Kimberly Steward, Chris Moore, Lauren Beck and Kevin J. Walsh	**Best Directing**: **Damien Chazelle – La La Land**‡; Denis Villeneuve – Arrival; Mel Gibson – Hacksaw Ridge; Kenneth Lonergan – Manchester by the Sea; Barry Jenkins – Moonlight
**Best Actor in a Leading Role**: **Casey Affleck – Manchester by the Sea as Lee Chandler**‡; Andrew Garfield – Hacksaw Ridge as Desmond Doss; Ryan Gosling – La La Land as Sebastian "Seb" Wilder; Viggo Mortensen – Captain Fantastic as Ben Cash; Denzel Washington – Fences as Troy Maxson	**Best Actress in a Leading Role**: **Emma Stone – La La Land as Amelia "Mia" Dolan**‡; Isabelle Huppert – Elle as Michèle Leblanc; Ruth Negga – Loving as Mildred Loving; Natalie Portman – Jackie as Jacqueline "Jackie" Kennedy; Meryl Streep – Florence Foster Jenkins as Florence Foster Jenkins
**Best Actor in a Supporting Role**: **Mahershala Ali – Moonlight as Juan**‡; Jeff Bridges – Hell or High Water as Marcus Hamilton; Lucas Hedges – Manchester by the Sea as Patrick Chandler; Dev Patel – Lion as Saroo Brierley; Michael Shannon – Nocturnal Animals as Detective Bobby Andes	**Best Actress in a Supporting Role**: **Viola Davis – Fences as Rose Maxson**‡; Naomie Harris – Moonlight as Paula; Nicole Kidman – Lion as Sue Brierley; Octavia Spencer – Hidden Figures as Dorothy Vaughan; Michelle Williams – Manchester by the Sea as Randi Chandler
**Best Writing (Original Screenplay)**: **Manchester by the Sea – Kenneth Lonergan**‡; 20th Century Women – Mike Mills; Hell or High Water – Taylor Sheridan; La La Land – Damien Chazelle; The Lobster – Yorgos Lanthimos and Efthimis Filippou	**Best Writing (Adapted Screenplay)**: **Moonlight – Barry Jenkins; story by Tarell Alvin McCraney; based on the play In Moonlight Black Boys Look Blue by Tarell Alvin McCraney‡**; Arrival – Eric Heisserer; based on the short story "Story of Your Life" written by Ted Chiang; Fences – August Wilson (posthumous nomination); based on his play; Hidden Figures – Allison Schroeder and Theodore Melfi; based on the book by Margot Lee Shetterly; Lion – Luke Davies; based on the book A Long Way Home by Saroo Brierley
**Best Animated Feature Film**: **Zootopia – Byron Howard, Rich Moore and Clark Spencer**‡; Kubo and the Two Strings – Travis Knight and Arianne Sutner; Moana – John Musker, Ron Clements and Osnat Shurer; My Life as a Zucchini – Claude Barras and Max Karli; The Red Turtle – Michaël Dudok de Wit and Toshio Suzuki	**Best Foreign Language Film**: **The Salesman (Iran) in Persian – Directed by Asghar Farhadi**‡; Land of Mine (Denmark) in Danish – Directed by Martin Zandvliet; A Man Called Ove (Sweden) in Swedish – Directed by Hannes Holm; Tanna (Australia) in Nauvhal – Directed by Martin Butler and Bentley Dean; Toni Erdmann (Germany) in German – Directed by Maren Ade
**Best Documentary (Feature)**: **O.J.: Made in America – Ezra Edelman and Caroline Waterlow**‡; 13th – Ava DuVernay, Spencer Averick and Howard Barish; Fire at Sea – Gianfranco Rosi and Donatella Palermo; I Am Not Your Negro – Raoul Peck, Rémi Grellety and Hébert Peck; Life, Animated – Roger Ross Williams and Julie Goldman	**Best Documentary (Short Subject)**: **The White Helmets – Orlando von Einsiedel and Joanna Natasegara**‡; 4.1 Miles – Daphne Matziaraki; Extremis – Dan Krauss; Joe's Violin – Kahane Cooperman and Raphaela Neihausen; Watani: My Homeland – Marcel Mettelsiefen and Stephen Ellis
**Best Short Film (Live Action)**: **Sing – Kristóf Deák and Anna Udvardy**‡; Ennemis intérieurs – Sélim Azzazi; La femme et le TGV – Timo von Gunten and Giacun Caduff; Silent Nights – Aske Bang and Kim Magnusson; Timecode – Juanjo Giménez	**Best Short Film (Animated)**: **Piper – Alan Barillaro and Marc Sondheimer**‡; Blind Vaysha – Theodore Ushev; Borrowed Time – Andrew Coats and Lou Hamou-Lhadj; Pear Cider and Cigarettes – Robert Valley and Cara Speller; Pearl – Patrick Osborne
**Best Music (Original Score)**: **La La Land – Justin Hurwitz**‡; Jackie – Mica Levi; Lion – Dustin O'Halloran and Hauschka; Moonlight – Nicholas Britell; Passengers – Thomas Newman	**Best Music (Original Song)**: **"City of Stars" from La La Land – Music by Justin Hurwitz; lyrics by Benj Pasek and Justin Paul**‡; "Audition (The Fools Who Dream)" from La La Land – Music by Justin Hurwitz; lyrics by Benj Pasek and Justin Paul; "Can't Stop the Feeling!" from Trolls – Music and lyrics by Justin Timberlake, Max Martin and Karl Johan Schuster; "The Empty Chair" from Jim: The James Foley Story – Music and lyrics by J. Ralph and Sting; "How Far I'll Go" from Moana – Music and lyrics by Lin-Manuel Miranda
**Best Sound Editing**: **Arrival – Sylvain Bellemare**‡; Deepwater Horizon – Wylie Stateman and Renée Tondelli; Hacksaw Ridge – Robert Mackenzie and Andy Wright; La La Land – Ai-Ling Lee and Mildred Iatrou Morgan; Sully – Alan Robert Murray and Bub Asman	**Best Sound Mixing**: **Hacksaw Ridge – Kevin O'Connell, Andy Wright, Robert Mackenzie and Peter Grace**‡; 13 Hours: The Secret Soldiers of Benghazi – Greg P. Russell, (Note: AMPAS revoked Russell's nomination after discovering that he had contacted voters for the award by telephone in violation of campaigning regulations.) Gary Summers, Jeffrey J. Haboush and Mac Ruth; Arrival – Bernard Gariépy Strobl and Claude La Haye; La La Land – Andy Nelson, Ai-Ling Lee and Steven A. Morrow; Rogue One: A Star Wars Story – David Parker, Christopher Scarabosio and Stuart Wilson
**Best Production Design**: **La La Land – Production design: David Wasco; set decoration: Sandy Reynolds-Wasco**‡; Arrival – Production design: Patrice Vermette; set decoration: Paul Hotte; Fantastic Beasts and Where to Find Them – Production design: Stuart Craig; set decoration: Anna Pinnock; Hail, Caesar! – Production design: Jess Gonchor; set decoration: Nancy Haigh; Passengers – Production design: Guy Hendrix Dyas; set decoration: Gene Serdena	**Best Cinematography**: **La La Land – Linus Sandgren**‡; Arrival – Bradford Young; Lion – Greig Fraser; Moonlight – James Laxton; Silence – Rodrigo Prieto
**Best Makeup and Hairstyling**: **Suicide Squad – Alessandro Bertolazzi, Giorgio Gregorini and Christopher Nelson**‡; A Man Called Ove – Eva von Bahr and Love Larson; Star Trek Beyond – Joel Harlow and Richard Alonzo	**Best Costume Design**: **Fantastic Beasts and Where to Find Them – Colleen Atwood**‡; Allied – Joanna Johnston; Florence Foster Jenkins – Consolata Boyle; Jackie – Madeline Fontaine; La La Land – Mary Zophres
**Best Film Editing**: **Hacksaw Ridge – John Gilbert**‡; Arrival – Joe Walker; Hell or High Water – Jake Roberts; La La Land – Tom Cross; Moonlight – Nat Sanders and Joi McMillon	**Best Visual Effects**: **The Jungle Book – Robert Legato, Adam Valdez, Andrew R. Jones and Dan Lemmon**‡; Deepwater Horizon – Craig Hammack, Jason Snell, Jason Billington and Burt Dalton; Doctor Strange – Stephane Ceretti, Richard Bluff, Vincent Cirelli and Paul Corbould; Kubo and the Two Strings – Steve Emerson, Oliver Jones, Brian McLean and Brad Schiff; Rogue One: A Star Wars Story – John Knoll, Mohen Leo, Hal Hickel and Neil Corbould

=== Governors Awards ===
The academy held its 8th annual Governors Awards ceremony on November 12, 2016, during which the following awards were presented:

==== Honorary Awards ====
- To Jackie Chan, an international film star who has captivated millions with his wit, boundless energy and unparalleled athletic artistry.
- To Anne V. Coates, in recognition of a film editing career of remarkable breadth and exceptional collaborative achievement.
- To Lynn Stalmaster, a true pioneer whose keen insight and inspired creativity transformed the art of motion picture casting.
- To Frederick Wiseman, whose masterful and distinctive documentaries examine the familiar and reveal the unexpected.

=== Films with multiple nominations and awards ===
Films that received multiple nominations
Nominations	Film
14	La La Land
8	Arrival
8	Moonlight
6	Hacksaw Ridge
6	Lion
6	Manchester by the Sea
4	Fences
4	Hell or High Water
3	Hidden Figures
3	Jackie
2	A Man Called Ove
2	Deepwater Horizon
2	Fantastic Beasts and Where to Find Them
2	Florence Foster Jenkins
2	Kubo and the Two Strings
2	Moana
2	Passengers
2	Rogue One: A Star Wars Story

Films that received multiple awards
Awards	Film
6	La La Land
3	Moonlight
2	Hacksaw Ridge
2	Manchester by the Sea

== Presenters and performers ==
The following individuals, listed in order of appearance, presented awards or performed musical numbers.

=== Presenters ===
Name(s)	Role
Randy Thomas	Served as announcer for the 89th annual Academy Awards
Alicia Vikander	Presented the award for Best Supporting Actor
Jason Bateman; Kate McKinnon	Presented the awards for Best Makeup and Hairstyling and Best Costume Design
Taraji P. Henson; Janelle Monáe; Octavia Spencer	Presented the award for Best Documentary Feature
Dwayne Johnson	Introduced the performance of Best Original Song nominee "How Far I'll Go"
Cheryl Boone Isaacs (AMPAS president)	Introduced a special presentation highlighting the benefits of film and diversity
Sofia Boutella; Chris Evans	Presented the awards for Best Sound Editing and Best Sound Mixing
Vince Vaughn	Presented the Governor Award
Mark Rylance	Presented the award for Best Supporting Actress
Shirley MacLaine; Charlize Theron	Presented the award for Best Foreign Language Film
Dev Patel	Introduced the performance of Best Original Song nominee "The Empty Chair"
Gael García Bernal; Hailee Steinfeld	Presented the awards for Best Animated Short Film and Best Animated Feature Film
Jamie Dornan; Dakota Johnson	Presented the award for Best Production Design
Riz Ahmed; Felicity Jones	Presented the award for Best Visual Effects
Michael J. Fox; Seth Rogen	Presented the award for Best Film Editing
Salma Hayek; David Oyelowo	Presented the awards for Best Documentary Short Subject and Best Live Action Short Film
John Cho; Leslie Mann	Presented the segment of the Academy Scientific and Technical Awards
Javier Bardem; Meryl Streep	Presented the award for Best Cinematography
Ryan Gosling; Emma Stone	Introduced the performance of Best Original Song nominees "Audition (The Fools Who Dream)" and "City of Stars"
Samuel L. Jackson	Presented the award for Best Original Score
Scarlett Johansson	Presented the award for Best Original Song
Jennifer Aniston	Presented the "In Memoriam" tribute
Ben Affleck; Matt Damon (Note: Referred to only as Ben Affleck's "guest" in this segment.)	Presented the award for Best Original Screenplay
Amy Adams	Presented the award for Best Adapted Screenplay
Halle Berry	Presented the award for Best Director
Brie Larson	Presented the award for Best Actor
Leonardo DiCaprio	Presented the award for Best Actress
Warren Beatty; Faye Dunaway	Presented the award for Best Picture

=== Performers ===
Name(s)	Role	Performed
Harold Wheeler	Musical arranger and conductor	Orchestral
Justin Timberlake	Performer	Opening number: "Can't Stop the Feeling!" from Trolls and "Lovely Day"
Auliʻi Cravalho; Lin-Manuel Miranda	Performers	"How Far I'll Go" from Moana
Sting	Performer	"The Empty Chair" from Jim: The James Foley Story
John Legend	Performer	"City of Stars" and "Audition (The Fools Who Dream)" from La La Land
Sara Bareilles	Performer	"Both Sides, Now" during the annual "In Memoriam" tribute

== Ceremony information ==
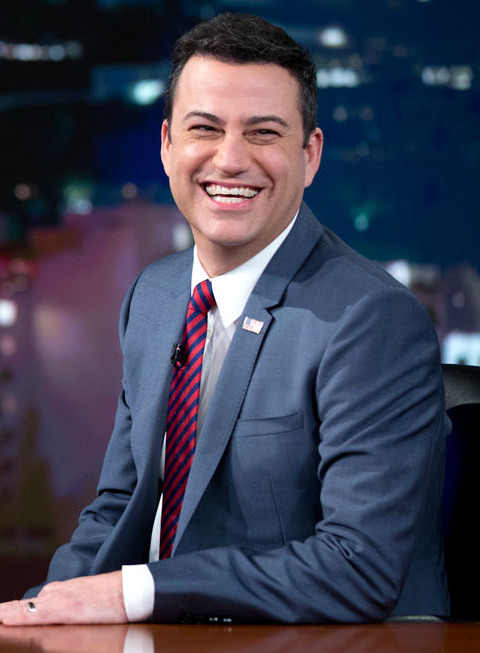
Jimmy Kimmel hosted the 89th Academy Awards

On August 31, 2016, AMPAS renewed their deal with ABC to broadcast the Academy Awards through 2028. The Hollywood Reporter reported that the producers of the previous year's ceremony, David Hill and Reginald Hudlin, were not asked to return. Its host Chris Rock told Variety regarding whether he would return to host, "someone else will do it." On November 4, 2016, Michael De Luca and Jennifer Todd were announced as the producers of the 89th ceremony. On December 5, 2016, it was announced that Jimmy Kimmel would host the ceremony. The Hollywood Reporter reported that Disney–ABC Television Group urged AMPAS to consider him, as he was the host of the ABC's Jimmy Kimmel Live!. Kimmel expressed that it was truly an honor and a thrill to be asked to host Academy Awards, commenting "Mike and Jennifer have an excellent plan and their enthusiasm is infectious. I am honored to have been chosen to host the 89th and final Oscars."

On February 8, 2017, Glenn Weiss was announced as the director, for the second year in a row. On February 14, 2017, producers announced the creative team, including the production designer Derek McLane (for his fifth consecutive year), writers Billy Kimball and Jon Macks, musical director Harold Wheeler and lighting designer Robert Dickinson. Due to Kimmel's hosting duties, ABC did not broadcast a special episode of Jimmy Kimmel Live! following the ceremony, as in past years. Instead, ABC aired Live from Hollywood: The After Party, co-hosted by Anthony Anderson and Lara Spencer of Good Morning America.

=== Box office performance of nominated films ===
North American box office gross for Best Picture nominees
Film	Pre-nomination (before Jan. 24)	Post-nomination (Jan. 24 – Feb. 26)	Post-awards (after Feb. 26)	Total
Hidden Figures	$85 million	$67.7 million	$16.5 million	$169.3 million
La La Land	$90.5 million	$50.5 million	$10.2 million	$151.1 million
Arrival	$95.7 million	$4.6 million	$210,648	$100.5 million
Hacksaw Ridge	$65.5 million	$1.4 million	$274,090	$67.2 million
Fences	$48.8 million	$7.7 million	$1.1 million	$57.7 million
Lion	$16.5 million	$26.3 million	$8.9 million	$51.7 million
Manchester by the Sea	$39 million	$7.9 million	$819,980	$47.7 million
Moonlight	$15.9 million	$6.4 million	$5.6 million	$27.9 million
Hell or High Water	$27 million	–	–	$27 million
Total	$483.9 million	$172.4 million	$43.6 million	$700.1 million
Average	$53.8 million	$19.2 million	$4.8 million	$77.8 million

At the time of the nominations announcement on January 24, 2017, the combined gross of the nine Best Picture nominees at the North American box offices was $483.8 million, with an average of $53.8 million per film. When the nominations were announced, Arrival was the highest-grossing film among the Best Picture nominees with $95.7 million in domestic box office receipts. La La Land was the second-highest-grossing film with $90.5 million, followed by Hidden Figures ($85 million), Hacksaw Ridge ($65.5 million), Fences ($48.8 million), Manchester by the Sea ($39 million), Hell or High Water ($27 million), Lion ($16.5 million) and Moonlight ($15.8 million). Moonlight became the second-lowest-grossing film to win Best Picture award.

Thirty-five nominations went to 13 films on the list of the top 50 grossing movies of the year. Of those 13 films, only Zootopia (3rd), Moana (15th), La La Land (45th), and Arrival (48th) were nominated for Best Picture, Best Animated Feature or any of the directing, acting or screenwriting awards. The other top 50 box-office hits that earned nominations were Rogue One: A Star Wars Story (4th), The Jungle Book (5th), Fantastic Beasts and Where to Find Them (8th), Suicide Squad (10th), Doctor Strange (11th), Star Trek Beyond (24th), Trolls (25th), Passengers (30th), and Sully (32nd).

=== Racial diversity ===
In the previous two years, the awards had come under scrutiny for the lack of racial diversity among the nominees in major categories, which included no actors of color being nominated. After the nominees for the 89th Awards were announced on January 24, many media outlets noted the diversity of the nominations, which included a record-tying seven non-white actors and a record-setting six black actors. For the first time in the academy's history, each acting category had black actors, with three nominated in the Best Supporting Actress category and three black screenwriters nominated in the Best Adapted Screenplay category in the same year. Also nominated was one black director, the fourth in Oscar history.

The awards continued to be criticized by actors and media organizations representing non-black minorities in America. The National Hispanic Media Coalition stated that Latino actors were "not getting the opportunities to work in front of camera, and with few exceptions, in back of the camera as well." Daniel Mayeda, chair of the Asian Pacific American Media Coalition, stated that the omission of Asian actors from the nominations list (with only one actor, Dev Patel, nominated) reflected "the continued lack of real opportunities for Asians in Hollywood". A skit performed during the ceremony, in which a group of tourists enter the theater, led to criticism of host Kimmel when he was accused of mocking an Asian woman's name.

Having previously been nominated for Doubt (2008) and The Help (2011), Viola Davis became the first African-American actress to garner three Academy Award nominations. She went on to win the award, making her the first African-American to achieve the Triple Crown of Acting: winning a competitive Emmy, Tony, and Oscar in acting categories. Bradford Young became the first African-American to be nominated for Best Cinematography, while Joi McMillon became the first African-American to be nominated for Best Film Editing since Hugh A. Robertson for Midnight Cowboy, as well as the first black woman to be nominated for that award. Octavia Spencer became the first African-American actress to be nominated after having already won before. Moonlight became the first film with an all-black cast to win the Best Picture award. Additionally, the ceremony had the most black winners of the Academy Awards ever.

=== Travel ban controversy ===
Iranian director Asghar Farhadi, who won the award for Best Foreign Language Film for The Salesman, was revealed to initially be unable to attend the ceremony due to President Donald Trump's immigration ban. He boycotted the event, saying, "I have decided to not attend the Academy Awards ceremony alongside my fellow members of the cinematic community." The academy president Cheryl Boone Isaacs reacted to the travel ban, saying, "America should always be not a barrier but a beacon and each and every one of us knows that there are some empty chairs in this room which has made academy artists into activists."

Two prominent Iranian Americans – engineer Anousheh Ansari, known as the first female space tourist, and Firouz Naderi, a former director of Solar Systems Exploration at NASA – accepted Asghar Farhadi's Oscar on his behalf at the ceremony. Congratulations which had initially been tweeted to the Iranian people from the US State Department's official Persian-language Twitter account were deleted following the acceptance speech given by Firouz Naderi in which President Trump's travel ban was described as "inhumane".

=== Best Picture announcement error ===
Warren Beatty and Faye Dunaway came onstage to present the award for Best Picture, in celebration of the 50th anniversary of Bonnie and Clyde. After opening the envelope, Beatty hesitated, eventually showing it to Dunaway, who glanced at it and declared La La Land to be the winner. However, more than two minutes later, as the producers of La La Land were making their acceptance speeches, Oscar crew members came on stage and took the envelopes from those assembled, explaining to them that there had been a mistake. La La Land producer Fred Berger, having heard the news, concluded his brief speech by saying, "We lost, by the way".

Beatty was then given the correct opened envelope as La La Land producer Jordan Horowitz stepped to the microphone, announced the error, stated that Moonlight had actually won the award, and took the card bearing the film's title from Beatty's hand and showed it to the camera and the audience as proof. The La La Land team, particularly Horowitz, would later be praised for their professional handling of the situation. Beatty returned to the microphone and explained that the envelope he had initially been given named Emma Stone for her actress performance in La La Land, hence his confused pause, and confirmed that Moonlight was the winner. The producers of Moonlight then came onstage, Horowitz presented the Best Picture award given to them, and they gave their acceptance speeches.

According to The Hollywood Reporter, PricewaterhouseCoopers (PwC) – the accounting firm responsible for tabulating results, preparing the envelopes, and handing them to presenters – creates two sets of envelopes, which are kept on opposite sides of the stage. It is intended that each award has one primary envelope and one backup envelope that remains with one of the PwC staff in the wings. (An emergency third set of envelopes is kept at an undisclosed location until the first two sets of envelopes are confirmed to have arrived at the Oscars ceremony location safely.) Video stills from the broadcast show that Beatty and Dunaway had been given the single remaining still-unopened backup envelope for the Best Actress award as they walked onto the stage.

PwC issued a statement apologizing for this error:

We sincerely apologize to Moonlight, La La Land, Warren Beatty, Faye Dunaway, and Oscar viewers for the error that was made during the award announcement for Best Picture. The presenters had mistakenly been given the wrong category envelope and when discovered, was immediately corrected. We are currently investigating how this could have happened, and deeply regret that this occurred. We appreciate the grace with which the nominees, the Academy, ABC, and Jimmy Kimmel handled the situation.

An article from The New York Times explained:

The design of the envelopes could have been a factor. The envelopes were redesigned this year to feature red paper with gold lettering that specified the award enclosed, rather than gold paper with dark lettering. That could have made the lettering harder to read. The Academy of Motion Picture Arts and Sciences, not PwC, is responsible for the design and procurement of the envelopes.

Brian Cullinan, the PwC accountant who gave the wrong envelope to Beatty, had been instructed not to use social media during the event; however, moments after handing over the envelope, he had tweeted a snapshot of Stone standing backstage. Variety published photographs of Cullinan that were taken at the time which showed him backstage while tweeting the image.

=== Critical reviews ===
The show received a mixed reception from media publications. Some media outlets were more critical and complained of repetitive jokes; Jeff Jensen of Entertainment Weekly complained that the show "didn't know when to stop and didn't know when to bail on stuff that wasn't working", and Kristi Turnquist of The Oregonian agreed and especially noted the repeated segments featuring actors discussing their favorite films at length to be "tedious and ill-advised". Writing for Time television critic Daniel D'Addario bemoaned that, "It was unfortunate that the evening's host didn't seem to share the evening's general embrace of humanity."

Some media outlets reviewed the broadcast more positively with some praise for Kimmel. Variety television critic Sonia Saraiya praised Kimmel's performance writing that he "found a way to balance the telecast between that sensibility – the treacly self-satisfaction of sweeping orchestrals and tap dancing starlets." Chief television critics, Robert Bianco of USA Today and Frazier Moore from Associated Press applauded Kimmel's hosting saying he "was up to the challenge" while Moore added that the ceremony's induction of the montage of moviegoers shows that "Hollywood can surmount its share of walls." Brian Lowry of CNN gave an average critique of the ceremony but acclaimed Kimmel's hosting. Many critics praised the playful jabs between Kimmel and Matt Damon, who was introduced as Ben Affleck's unnamed guest as well as music being played over him.

=== Rating and reception ===
The American telecast on ABC drew an average of 32.9 million people over its length, which was a 4% decrease from the previous year. The show also earned lower Nielsen ratings compared to the previous ceremony with 22.4% of households watching over a 36 share. In addition, it received a lower 18–49 demo rating with a 9.1 rating over a 26 share. It also had the lowest U.S. viewership since the 80th ceremony in 2008, which averaged 32 million viewers. Nonetheless, it was the eighth most watched television broadcast in the United States in 2017, behind only sport events and the Donald Trump speech to a joint session of Congress.

In July 2017, the ceremony presentation received six nominations for the 69th Primetime Creative Arts Emmys. The following month, the ceremony won two of those nominations for Outstanding Creative Achievement In Interactive Media within an Unscripted Program and for Outstanding Directing for a Variety Special (Glenn Weiss).

== "In Memoriam" ==
The annual "In Memoriam" segment was introduced by Jennifer Aniston, with Sara Bareilles performing a rendition of the Joni Mitchell song "Both Sides, Now" during the montage. Beforehand, Aniston paid verbal tribute to actor Bill Paxton, who died the day before the ceremony. The segment paid tribute to:

- Arthur Hiller – Director, Academy president 1993–1997
- Ken Adam – Production designer
- Tracy Scott – Script supervisor
- Bill Nunn – Actor
- Alice Arlen – Screenwriter
- George Kennedy – Actor
- Gene Wilder – Actor, director, producer, screenwriter
- Donald P. Harris – Film executive
- Paul Sylbert – Production designer, set decorator
- Michael Cimino – Director, producer, screenwriter
- Andrzej Wajda – Theater director
- Patty Duke – Actress
- Garry Marshall – Actor, director, producer
- Wilma Baker – Animator
- Emmanuelle Riva – Actress
- Janet Patterson – Costume designer, production designer
- Anton Yelchin – Actor
- Mary Tyler Moore – Actress
- Prince – Singer-songwriter, record producer
- Kenny Baker – Actor, musician
- John Hurt – Actor
- Jim Clark – Editor
- Norma Moriceau – Costume designer, production designer
- Fern Buchner – Makeup artist
- Kit West – Special effects artist
- Lupita Tovar – Actress
- Manlio Rocchetti – Makeup artist
- Pat Conroy – Author
- Nancy Davis Reagan – Actress, First Lady of the United States 1981-89
- Abbas Kiarostami – Director, screenwriter, producer
- William Peter Blatty – Writer, filmmaker
- Ken Howard – Actor
- Tyrus Wong – Artist
- Héctor Babenco – Actor, director, producer
- Curtis Hanson – Director, producer, screenwriter
- Marni Nixon – Singer, actress
- Ray West – Sound engineer
- Raoul Coutard – Cinematographer
- Zsa Zsa Gabor – Actress, socialite
- Antony Gibbs – Editor
- Om Puri – Actor
- Andrea Jaffe – Publicist
- Richard Portman – Sound editor
- Debbie Reynolds – Actress, singer, humanitarian
- Carrie Fisher – Actress, writer, humorist

The slide for Janet Patterson, an Australian costume designer, mistakenly used a photograph of Australian producer Jan Chapman, who is still alive.

== See also ==
- 22nd Critics' Choice Awards
- 37th Golden Raspberry Awards
- 59th Grammy Awards
- 69th Primetime Emmy Awards
- 70th British Academy Film Awards
- 71st Tony Awards
- 74th Golden Globe Awards
- List of submissions to the 89th Academy Awards for Best Foreign Language Film
