= Andrea Jaffe =

American entertainment publicist (1950–2016)

Andrea Sue Jaffe (February 18, 1950 – August 24, 2016) was a prominent Hollywood publicist in the 1980s and early 1990s. Jaffe initially worked as an assistant at marketing and public relations agency Rogers & Cowan before working for PMK and establishing her own publicity company, Andrea Jaffe and Associates. Her clients included Tom Cruise, Farrah Fawcett, Demi Moore, and Dustin Hoffman.

== Career ==
Jaffe began her public relations career at Rogers & Cowan working as an assistant before joining PMK as a vice president. In 1986, she formed her own publicity company, Andrea Jaffe and Associates. She acted as a personal press agent for Hollywood clients such as actors Tom Cruise, Dustin Hoffman, film director Oliver Stone and actresses Farrah Fawcett and Demi Moore. Jaffe also worked on public relations of films such as Platoon (1986), Rain Man (1988), and JFK (1991). In January 1992, Jaffe closed her firm to become the president of marketing for film studio 20th Century Fox, a role which saw her oversee marketing for all domestic films released by the company. After working for 20th Century Fox for three years, she worked as an independent marketing consultant and worked with charities such as Save the Children.

== Personal life ==
Andrea Jaffe was the daughter of film executive Leo Jaffe and sister of film producer Stanley R. Jaffe.

== Death ==
Jaffe died on August 24, 2016, at the age of 66 in Wilmington, North Carolina after a prolonged illness. She was mentioned in the 89th Academy Awards "In Memoriam" segment.
