= Anthony Wonke =

British documentary filmmaker

- Occupations: Film maker, director, producer
- Notable work: Ronaldo, Fire in the Night, The Tower: A Tale of Two Cities

Anthony Wonke is an Emmy and triple BAFTA-winning British film director, and an Oscar- nominated and Emmy-winning executive producer. Working across cinematic documentaries, feature films, television series, and high-end commercials. He has also received the Prix Italia, Peabody, Grierson, RTS, and One World Media awards for his work. His films are noted for combining intelligence, visual flair, and emotional insight, and have premiered at festivals across the US, Canada, Asia, Europe, and the UK, as well as being screened on Netflix, Amazon, Disney+, Sky, the BBC, Channel 4, HBO, PBS, and Arte. In 2026 he made his debut as a narrative feature director with In the Shadows, starring Jasmine Jobson. For commercials, Wonke is represented by Partizan and has directed campaigns for Global brands including Google, Johnnie Walker, Vodafone, Expedia, Uber, Jaguar, and DAZN, earning nominations and awards at Cannes Lions, the Clios, and the British Arrows.

== Career ==
Wonke's most recent film is In the Shadows (2026), his debut narrative feature, starring Jasmine Jobson. It's having its world premiere at the BFI London Film Festival, ahead of a UK theatrical release on 30 October 2026.

The same year, he directed The Decision, a feature documentary on the life and career of former Argentine president Mauricio Macri, produced by Oscar winning Frida Torresblanco for Hangtime Films.

In 2024, he directed The Accidental Spy, a feature documentary on Blerim Skoro, an American CIA and FBI informant who infiltrated al-Qaeda after being recruited from a Manhattan prison following 9/11. The film had its world premiere at the Warsaw International Film Festival, where it was nominated for Best Documentary Feature in the Documentary Competition; it went on to win Best Documentary Feature at the Seoul Whistler Film Festival and Best Documentary Director at the Silk Road International Film Festival. It is now streaming on Amazon.

In 2022, he directed Dettori, a feature documentary on the life and career of champion jockey Frankie Dettori, produced by Embankment Films and Trombone Pictures for Sky. It was nominated for the FOCAL International Award for Best Use of Footage in a Sports Production, shared with Jack Lee Taylor and Nick Ryle.

In 2020, he directed The Man Who Walked Around the World, which received an official selection at the Edinburgh International Film Festival.

In 2019, he directed Unmasking Jihadi John: Anatomy of a Terrorist, a feature documentary

for HBO on the identity of the ISIS executioner known as "Jihadi John." It was nominated for a BAFTA (Best Current Affairs Documentary, 2020), an International Emmy, and a Grierson Award.

In 2018, his feature documentary The Director and the Jedi, following director Rian Johnson during the making of Star Wars: The Last Jedi and produced for Lucasfilm/Disney, had its world premiere at SXSW.

In 2015, Wonke released two theatrical documentary features: Ronaldo, released by Universal Pictures, an intimate portrait of footballer Cristiano Ronaldo produced by the makers of Senna and Amy; and Being AP, released by BBC Films on champion jump jockey A. P. McCoy, which had its world premiere at the Toronto International Film Festival.

In 2014, he directed Children on the Frontline, a documentary for Channel 4 and Arte on children living through the Syrian civil war, co-directed with Marcel Mettelsiefen. The film received 16 awards in total, including an Emmy, two BAFTAs, the Prix Italia, a Peabody Award, an RTS Award, a Grierson Award, and a One World Media Award.

In 2013, he directed Fire in the Night, a theatrical documentary on the Piper Alpha disaster, produced by STV for Creative Scotland/BBC. It won the Audience Award at the Edinburgh International Film Festival and Best Single Documentary at the BAFTA Scotland awards, where it was also nominated for the Audience Film Award and Best Feature Film.

In 2012, he directed three films: The Battle for Marjah, made with Ben Anderson for HBO/Channel 4, which followed a US Marine platoon in Afghanistan and was nominated for three Emmy Awards, winning the History Makers Award for Best Current Affairs; Crack House USA, made for MSNBC/More4 about a Chicago drug gang brought down by a federal wiretap, which was nominated for a BAFTA for Factual Photography; and Gymnast, a documentary following the British Olympic gymnastics squad, shot with exclusive access in 2008 and broadcast on BBC Two.

Around 2009, he directed The £800M Railway Station, a six-part series for BBC Two on the renovation of St Pancras International, which was nominated for a Broadcasting Press Guild Award.

In 2008, he directed The Tower: A Tale of Two Cities, an eight-part BBC One documentary series that he directed and series-produced over three years, following a London tower block being sold as luxury flats amid one of the city's poorest estates. It won the BAFTA for Best Factual Series and the RTS Award for Factual Editing, and was nominated for a Grierson Award and a Broadcast Award.

As executive producer, Wonke's credits include Watani: My Homeland (2016), a 40-minute documentary following a family's escape from the Syrian Civil War, which was nominated for the Academy Award for Best Documentary Short.

Wonke is represented for film and television by Casarotto Ramsay & Associates, and for commercials by Partizan.

== Personal life ==
Wonke lives in North London.

== Filmography ==
Executive producer

Year	Title	Awards and nominations
2016	Children of Syria	Winner - Emmy - Current Affairs Nominated - Emmy - Best Documentary
2016	Watani: My Homeland	Nominated - Oscar - Best Documentary Short

Director

Year	Title	Awards and nominations
2026	In The Shadows	
2026	The Decision	
2024	The Accidental Spy	World premiere, Warsaw International Film Festival — Nominated, Best Documentary Feature (Documentary Competition). Winner, Best Documentary Feature (Seoul Whistler Film Festival). Winner, Best Documentary Director (Silk Road International Film Festival)
2022	Dettori	Nominated, FOCAL International Award — Best Use of Footage in a Sports Production (shared with Jack Lee Taylor and Nick Ryle)
2020	The Man Who Walked Around the World	Premiered Edinburgh International Film Festival
2019	Unmasking Jihadi John: Anatomy of a Terrorist	Nominated - BAFTA Awards 2020- Best Current Affairs Documentary Nominated. - Emmy Awards 2020- News & Documentary Winner - Spotlight Documentary Film Awards 2019 Winner - Telly Awards 2021 - Music composer Nominated - The Grierson Trust British Documentary Award 2019
2017	The Director and The Jedi	Official Selection - SXSW 2018
2015	Ronaldo	
2015	Being AP	Official Selection - Toronto Film Festival 2015
2014	Children on the Frontline - Syria	Winner - Prix Italia - Best TV Documentary, Current Affairs Winner - International Emmy; Winner - Cinema for Peace Award, Berlin 2014; Winner - Bayeux-Calvados Award - Long-Format Television; Winner - Grierson Award - Best Documentary On An International Contemporary Theme; Winner - One World Media - Television Award; Winner - Edinburgh TV Awards - Producer/Director Debut Award (Marcel Mettelsiefen); Winner - AIB Media Excellence Awards - International Current Affairs Documentary Television; Winner - RTS - International Documentary; Winner - BAFTA Current Affairs; Winner - BAFTA CRAFT - Factual Photography; Winner - LA FIGRA Award; Winner - Peabody Awards - Documentary; Nominated - BAFTA CRAFT - Best Newcomer (Marcel Mettelsefien); Nominated - Amnesty's Media Award - Documentary; Nominated - Rory Peck Award - Feature; Nominated - Frontline Awards - Broadcast; Nominated - Broadcast Awards - Best Current Affairs Documentary
2013	Fire in the Night	Official Selection - Edinburgh International Film Festival 2013 Winner - Edinburgh International Film Festival 2013 - Audience Award; Winner - BAFTA Scotland - Single Documentary; Nominated - BAFTA Scotland - Cineworld Film Audience Award; Nominated - BAFTA Scotland - Feature Film; Winner - RTS Scotland Award - Factual; Nominated - Celtic Media Festival - Factual Single; Nominated - FOCAL International Awards - Best Use of Footage In a Cinema Release
2012	Between the Waves and the Sky	
2010	The Battle for Marjah	Winner - History Makers Award - Current Affairs, 2012 Nominated - News & Documentary Emmy Award 2012 - Outstanding Continuing Coverage of a News Story - Long Form; Nominated - News & Documentary Emmy Award 2012 - Outstanding Individual Achievement in a Craft: Editing - Documentary and Long Form; Nominated - News & Documentary Emmy Award 2012 - Outstanding Individual Achievement in a Craft: Music & Sound
2010	The £800M Railway Station	Nominated - Broadcasting Press Guild Award, 2008
2010	Crack House USA	Nominated - BAFTA - Best Factual Photography 2012
2010	Gymnast	
2004–07	The Tower: A Tale of Two Cities	Winner - BAFTA - Best Factual Series, 2008 Winner - RTS Award- Factual Editing, 2008 Nominated - Grierson Award - Documentary Series, 2008; Nominated - Broadcast Award - Factual Series, 2008; Nominated - Televisual Bulldog Award - Factual Series, 2008
2007	The Tower	Official selection Sheffield International film festival
2005	A Very British Bollywood	Official selection Sheffield International film festival
2003	Squaddies on the Rampage	
2003	Property People	
2002	Witness: Running for God	
2002	Bullet Catchers	
2001	Fraud Squad	
2001	Cutting Edge: Kidnap	
2001	The Art of Crime (ep: Inside Job)	
2000	Amsterdam: City of Sin	
1999	Behind the Crime (ep: "Car Crimes")	
1998	Staying Lost	Winner - Indies Award - Best Current Affairs Series, 1999 Nominated - BBC2 Awards - Documentary Series, 1999; Nominated - Grierson Awards - Documentary Series, 2000; Nominated - RTS Awards - Documentary & Factual Editing, 2000

== Awards and honours ==
=== Awards ===
- 2008 British Academy Television Award, British Academy Television Award for Best Factual Series: The Tower: A Tale of Two Cities
- 2008 RTS Award, Factual Editing: The Tower: A Tale of Two Cities
- 2012 History Makers Award, Best Current Affairs: The Battle for Marjah
- 2013 Edinburgh International Film Festival, Audience Award: Fire in the Night
- 2013 British Academy Scotland Awards, Best Single Documentary: Fire in the Night
