= Fire in the Night =

Fire in the Night may refer to:

- Fire in the Night (1955 film)
- Fire in the Night (2013 film)
- Fire in the Night (Dion album)
