= Steve Emerson (visual effects artist) =

American special effects supervisor

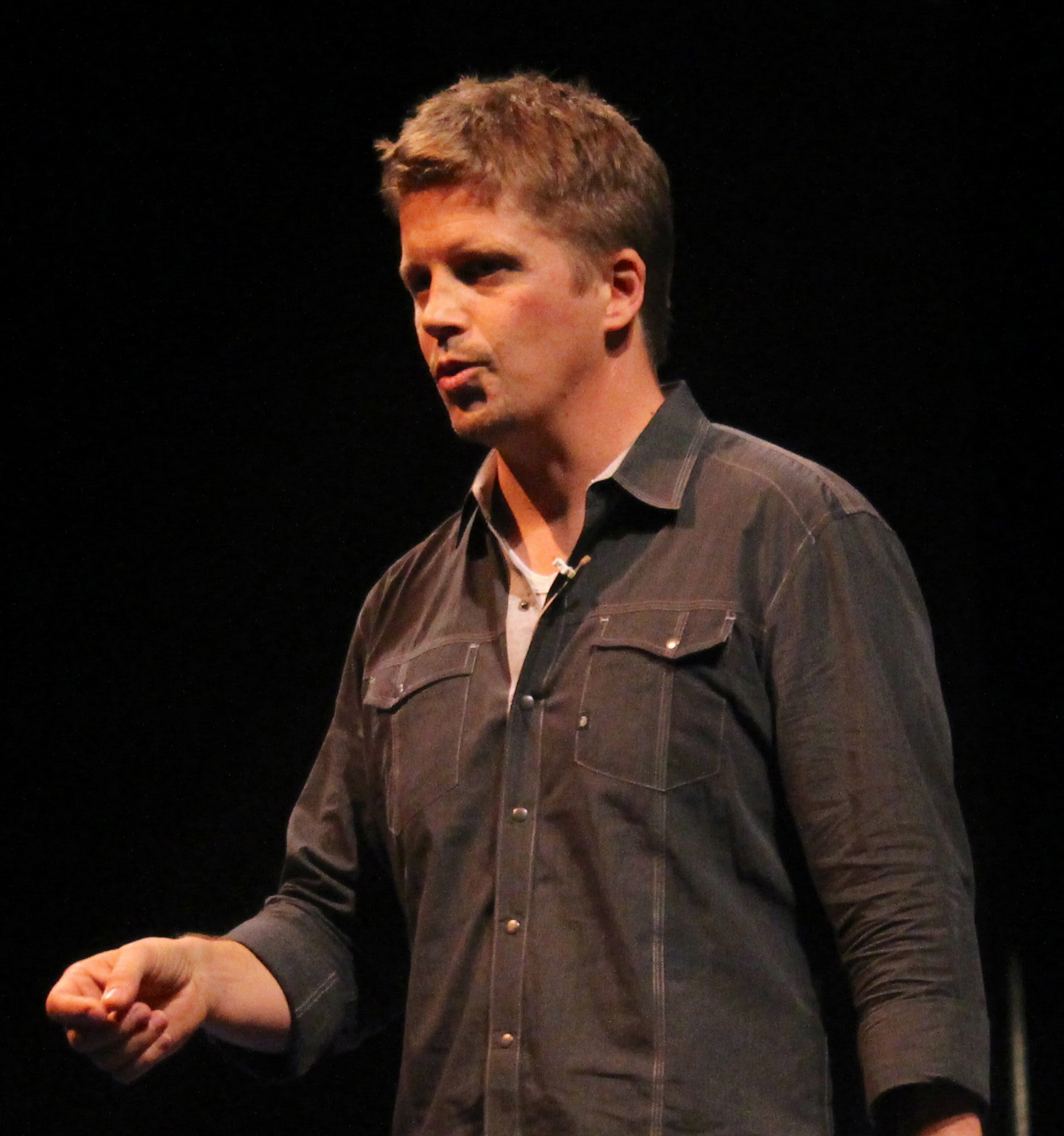
Emerson in 2015

Steve Emerson is an American visual effects supervisor. Known for his works at LAIKA as a visual effects supervisor in acclaimed films such as Coraline (2009), ParaNorman (2012), The Boxtrolls (2014) and Kubo and the Two Strings (2016) for which he received an Academy Award for Best Visual Effects nomination at the 89th Academy Awards. that he shared with Oliver Jones, Brian McLean, and Brad Schiff

== Filmography ==
Year	Title	Notes
2019	Missing Link	(visual effects supervisor)
2016	Kubo and the Two Strings	(visual effects supervisor)
2014	The Boxtrolls	(visual effects supervisor)
2012	ParaNorman	(compositing supervisor)
2009	Coraline	(2D supervisor)
2007	Beowulf	(digital compositor)
2007	Transformers	(digital compositor)
2004	NASCAR: The IMAX Experience	(Documentary short) (digital compositor)
2003	The Matrix Revolutions	(digital compositor)
2003	Our Country	(Documentary short) (digital compositor)
2003	The Matrix Reloaded	(digital compositor)
2003	Top Speed	(Documentary short) (digital effects: DKP 70mm Inc.) / (film recording: DKP 70mm Inc.)
2003	Coral Reef Adventure	(Documentary) (digital compositor)
2002	Phase IV	(digital compositor)
2002	Straight Up: Helicopters in Action	(Short documentary) (digital compositor)
2002	Space Station 3D	(Documentary) (digital compositor)
2001	Jane Doe	(TV Movie) (digital compositor)
2001	Prozac Nation	(digital compositor)
2001	All Access: Front Row. Backstage. Live!	(Documentary) (digital compositor)
2000	Michael Jordan to the Max	(Documentary) (digital compositor)
1998	Jack Frost	(data manager)
1997	Flubber	(data manager)

=== Other credits ===
- 2009 The Mouse That Soared (Short) (associate producer)
- 2005 Rocketbook Presents: The Great Gatsby (Video documentary) (executive producer)
- 2005 Rocketbook Presents: The Scarlet Letter (Video) (executive producer)
- 2005 Shakespeare's Hamlet (Video documentary) (executive producer)
- 1996 Gunplay
