= Oliver Jones (visual effects artist) =

British special effects supervisor

Oliver Jones is a British special effects supervisor. Known for his works at LAIKA as a visual effects supervisor in acclaimed films such as Coraline (2009), ParaNorman (2012), and Kubo and the Two Strings for which he received Academy Award for Best Visual Effects nomination at 89th Academy Awards, that he shared with Steve Emerson, Brian McLean, and Brad Schiff.

== Filmography ==
Year	Title	Notes
2005	Corpse Bride	(modeller)
2009	Fantastic Mr. Fox	(puppet model rigger)
2009	Coraline	(model rigger: animation)
2012	ParaNorman	(animation rigging supervisor)
2016	Kubo and the Two Strings	(animation rigging supervisor)
