= Leo Jaffe =

American film studio executive

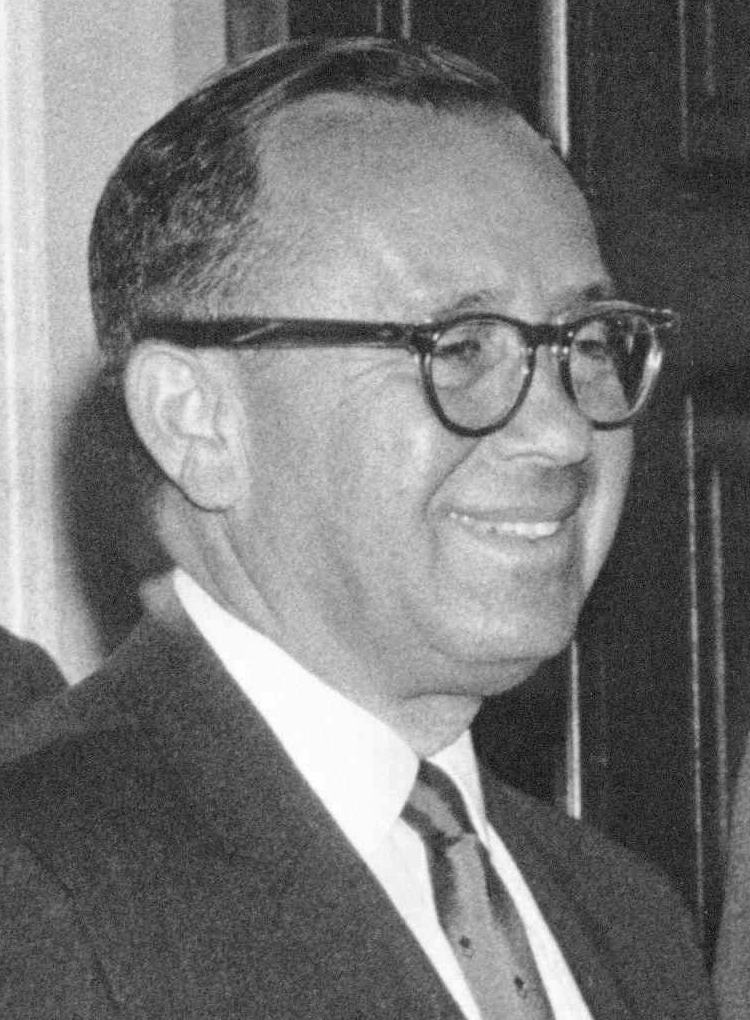
Leo Jaffe in 1963

Leo Jaffe (April 23, 1909 in New York City, New York – August 20, 1997 in New York City, New York) was an American film executive. He was chairman of the board of Columbia Pictures from 1973 until his retirement in 1981. He is the father of film producer Stanley R. Jaffe and film agent Andrea Jaffe.

== Career ==
The son of Lithuanian immigrants, Jaffe began working in a glue factory in the Bronx to put himself through college. While still a graduate at New York University, he began working in the mailroom at Columbia in the summer of 1930, spending his entire career there and working his way to the top. He became a travelling auditor and worked his way up the finance department, becoming treasurer and member of the board in 1956 and executive vice president in 1962. He ran the studio during the 1960s and 1970s becoming president in 1967 and chairman in August 1973. In 1979, Jaffe received the Academy of Motion Picture Arts and Sciences Jean Hersholt Award. In 1981 he retired after 51 years with the company and became chairman emeritus.

== Personal life ==
In 1968, Jaffe received the Bronze Medallion, New York City's highest civilian honor. In 1994, a Golden Palm Star on the Palm Springs, California, Walk of Stars was dedicated to him.

He was married three times and had three sons, Howard, Ira and Stanley and two daughters, Marie and Andrea. He is the father to producer and director Stanley R. Jaffe known for the movie Kramer vs. Kramer. Stanley went on to have two children Robert and Elizabeth Jaffe
