= Brian McLean (visual effects artist) =

American special effects person (born 1977)

Brian F McLean (born January 19, 1977) is an American special effects person.

He was born in Syracuse, New York. He received a Bachelor of Fine Arts in sculpture in 1999 from Boston University.

He is the director of rapid prototype at Laika. McLean is known for his works on acclaimed stop motion films such as Coraline (2009), ParaNorman (2012), The Boxtrolls (2014) and Kubo and the Two Strings for which he received an Academy Award for Best Visual Effects nomination at the 89th Academy Awards, that he shared with Steve Emerson, Oliver Jones, and Brad Schiff.

In 2016, he was awarded a Scientific and Engineering Award – an Academy plaque; at the Academy Scientific and Technical Awards from the Academy of Motion Pictures Arts and Science that he shared with Martin Meunier for pioneering the use of rapid prototyping and 3D printing in character animation-stop motion film productions.

In 2025, he presented at TedX Portland on The Art (and science) of Stop-motion animation and his talk was selected on Ted.com Considered one of the 25 Essential TedX talks of 2025

== Filmography ==
Year	Title	Notes
2009	Coraline	Facial structure supervisor
2012	ParaNorman	Creative supervisor: replacement animation and engineering
2014	The Boxtrolls	Creative supervisor: replacement animation and engineering
2016	Kubo and the Two Strings	Director of Rapid Prototype
2019	Missing Link	Director of Rapid Prototype
In production	Wildwood (film)	Director of Rapid Prototype

== Awards ==
- 2009: Annie Award for Special Achievement in Animation - Coraline
- 2015: Academy Scientific and Technical Awards (Academy Plaque) - "for pioneering the use of rapid prototyping for character animation in stop-motion film production."
- 2016: (nomination) Academy Award for Best Visual Effects - Kubo and the Two Strings
- 2017: Boston University - College of Fine Arts Distinguished Alumni Award
