= Tracy Scott =

American script supervisor (1970–2016)

- Born: March 8, 1970; Charleston, South Carolina, U.S.
- Died: April 30, 2016 (aged 46); Lady Lake, Florida, U.S.
- Years active: 1999–2016

Tracy Scott (March 8, 1970 – April 30, 2016) was an American script supervisor, who frequently collaborated with producer Megan Ellison on her productions, including Her, American Hustle, Foxcatcher and Joy.

== Biography ==
Born in Charleston, South Carolina and raised in Toledo, Ohio, Scott was a graduate of Miami University, as well as Watkins College of Art, Design & Film, during which she interned on the Stephen King adaptation of The Green Mile. Encouraged by Susan Malerstein, The Green Mile's script supervisor, Scott moved to Los Angeles in 1999.

Scott supervised the scripts for films such as Garden State, The Proposal, Up in the Air, The Last Song, Movie 43, Whiplash and The Gambler. Her last credits were in 2015, on the projects Joy, Concussion and Black Mass.

Scott also worked on television series such as Parks and Recreation, Sons of Anarchy, Wilfred and Happy Endings.

Scott was diagnosed with breast cancer in May 2015, and after undergoing treatments for the disease was informed in April 2016 she had cancer. She died at her parents' home in Florida on April 30, 2016, aged 46.
