= Watani: My Homeland =

- Film poster
- Directed by: Marcel Mettelsiefen
- Written by: Marcel Mettelsiefen
- Produced by: Marcel Mettelsiefen; Stephen Ellis
- Edited by: Stephen Ellis
- Production company: ITN Productions
- Release date: 28 October 2016
- Running time: 40 minutes
- Countries: United Kingdom; Syria; Germany
- Languages: English; Arabic

Watani: My Homeland is a 2016 documentary short film directed, produced and written by Marcel Mettelsiefen. The film follows the story of a family's escape from Syrian Civil War, and their attempt to start a new life in Germany.

It was shortlisted with ten other short-film from 61 entries submitted to the 89th Academy Awards in Best Documentary Short Subject category. It eventually received a nomination.

The same family is profiled in two Frontline documentaries, "Children of Aleppo" from 2014 that covers their time in Aleppo prior to Watani, and "Children of Syria" from 2015 that covers much of the same time period as Watani covers.

== Plot ==
It depicts the lives of Hammoudi, Helen, Farah and Sara, the young children of Free Syrian Army Commander Abu Ali. They live on the frontline of the civil war in Aleppo, the only family living in a derelict war zone that was once a busy residential neighborhood. After Abu Ali is captured by ISIS, the family is forced to flee their homeland and to start a new life in a small, medieval town in Germany.

== Accolades ==
- Academy Award for Best Documentary (Short Subject) – Nominated
