= Stanley R. Jaffe =

American film producer and director (1940–2025)

- Born: Stanley Richard Jaffe; July 31, 1940; New Rochelle, New York, U.S.
- Died: March 10, 2025 (aged 84); Rancho Mirage, California, U.S.
- Education: University of Pennsylvania
- Occupations: Film producer; director
- Known for: CEO of Columbia Pictures; Chairman of 20th Century Fox Academy Award Winner
- Spouses: Joan Ellen Goodman (divorced); Melinda Jill Marciano (m. 1986)
- Children: 4
- Father: Leo Jaffe

Stanley Richard Jaffe (/ˈdʒæfi/; July 31, 1940 – March 10, 2025) was an American film producer. His producing credits included Fatal Attraction, The Accused and Kramer vs. Kramer, which won an Academy Award for Best Picture.

== Background ==
Jaffe was born into a Jewish family in New Rochelle, New York, the son of film executive Leo Jaffe. He received a Bachelor of Science degree in economics from the Wharton School, University of Pennsylvania, in 1962.

== Career ==
In 1962, Jaffe joined Seven Arts Associates, and in 1964, he was named executive assistant to the president of Seven Arts. After Warner Bros. purchased Seven Arts in 1967, Jaffe left to join CBS for two years.

After producing Goodbye Columbus, Jaffe was appointed executive vice president and chief operations officer of Paramount Pictures in 1970, and within three months was named president. In 1971, he resigned to form an independent production company called Jaffilms, which was associated with Columbia Pictures. Jaffilms produced Bad Company (1972) and The Bad News Bears (1976). In 1977, Jaffe became executive vice president of worldwide production at Columbia Pictures.

Jaffe returned to independent production with Kramer vs. Kramer in 1979. In 1983, in collaboration with Sherry Lansing (then president of Twentieth Century-Fox), he started the production company Jaffe-Lansing. In 1991, he was named president and chief operating officer of Paramount Communications and dissolved his partnership with Lansing. In 1992, he was named successor to Brandon Tartikoff as president of Paramount.

When Viacom purchased Paramount in 1994, Jaffe was forced out and filed a lawsuit against Paramount for $20 million in a stock option dispute. The case was dismissed by the court in 1995 and Jaffe's company Jaffilms entered into a production agreement with Sony Pictures Entertainment.

=== Veto of the Star Trek Enterprise complex in Las Vegas ===
In or around 1992, a consortium of developers and city officials proposed a replica of the Star Trek ship Enterprise in Las Vegas. The giant scale model of the ship would include restaurants and tours but no hotel or casino. The proposal was approved by president of Paramount Sherry Lansing and only needed Jaffe's approval as Paramount CEO. However, Jaffe rejected the proposal, believing that if unsuccessful, the building would be a permanent reminder of failure.

== Death ==
Jaffe died at his home in Rancho Mirage, California, on March 10, 2025, aged 84.

== Awards and nominations ==
- 1994 Stanley Cup, as president of Paramount, which owned the New York Rangers.
- 1988 Academy Awards, nominated for Oscar for Best Picture, Fatal Attraction (1987)
- 1981 British Academy Film Awards, nominated for Best Film, Kramer vs. Kramer (1979)
- 1980 Academy Awards, won Oscar for Best Picture, Kramer vs. Kramer (1979)
- 1980, David di Donatello Awards, won David for Best Foreign Film (Miglior Film Straniero), Kramer vs. Kramer (1979)

== Filmography ==
Jaffe served as the producer for all films unless otherwise noted.

=== Film ===
Year	Film	Credit	Notes
1969	Goodbye, Columbus		
1970	I Start Counting		
1972	Bad Company		
1976	The Bad News Bears		
1979	Kramer vs. Kramer		
1981	Taps		
1983	Without a Trace		
1984	Racing with the Moon	Uncredited	
1984	Firstborn	Executive producer	
1987	Fatal Attraction		
1988	The Accused		
1989	Black Rain		
1992	School Ties		
1998	Madeline	Executive producer	
2000	I Dreamed of Africa		
2002	The Four Feathers		

As director

Year	Film
1983	Without a Trace
