= The Tower: A Tale of Two Cities =

- Genre: Documentary
- Directed by: Anthony Wonke
- Country of origin: United Kingdom
- Original language: English
- No. of series: 1
- No. of episodes: 8

Production
- Executive producer: Simon Ford
- Producer: Anthony Wonke
- Running time: 50 minutes

Original release
- Network: BBC One
- Release: 25 June 2007

The Tower: A Tale of Two Cities is a British television documentary series based on the Pepys estate in Deptford, south-east London. The eight-part series premiered on 25 June 2007, on BBC One.

In 2004, Lewisham council sold one of three adjacent public housing tower blocks on the economically deprived Pepys Estate to a private property developer. The tower was converted into luxury apartments and sold to people who, for the most part, did not grow up in the local area. The documentary was filmed over three years and chronicled the difficulties faced by some of the local residents in adapting to the changes sweeping the neighbourhood. Notable characters included heroin-addicted Leol and his alcoholic best friend Nicky, and the landlord of the local pub who is struggling with the challenges of satisfying his conservative (and dwindling) 'old guard' and tempting the new arrivals – mostly young and relatively wealthy – into his traditional boozer.

The Tower: A Tale of Two Cities won the BAFTA Award for Best Factual Series in 2008.
