= Ronaldo (film) =

- Theatrical poster
- Directed by: Anthony Wonke
- Produced by: Paul Martin
- Starring: Cristiano Ronaldo
- Cinematography: Mike Eley; Neil Harvey
- Music by: Walter Mair
- Production companies: On the Corner Films; We Came We Saw We Conquered Studios; Mediapro
- Distributed by: Universal Pictures; Picturehouse Entertainment
- Release date: 9 November 2015
- Running time: 92 minutes
- Country: United Kingdom
- Languages: English; Portuguese

Ronaldo is a 2015 British documentary film directed by Anthony Wonke. It tells the life and career of Portuguese professional footballer Cristiano Ronaldo. The film was released worldwide on 9 November 2015. A trailer for the film was released on 28 September 2015.

== Production ==
Directed by Anthony Wonke and executive-produced by Asif Kapadia, who directed Senna (2010) and Amy (2015), documentaries depicting the lives and deaths of Brazilian racing driver Ayrton Senna and English singer-songwriter Amy Winehouse respectively, Ronaldo was shot over 14 months with the film-makers gaining access to Ronaldo's private life and inner circle of friends, family and team-mates. The film was shot in Madeira, Ronaldo's birthplace, Funchal, where he began his professional career with Sporting CP, and Madrid, where he was residing when he played for Real Madrid. Ronaldo himself announced the film's production on Twitter on 9 June 2015, posting a picture of his son, Cristiano Jr., behind a camera along with the announcement.

== Synopsis ==
Ronaldo documents the life and way of thinking of Cristiano Ronaldo (born Cristiano Ronaldo dos Santos Aveiro; 5 February 1985), from his childhood until 2015, through a series of interviews with Ronaldo himself as well as friends and family. Parts of the film also follow Ronaldo's day-to-day life with family and friends, including his son Cristiano Jr., his mother Maria Dolores dos Santos Aveiro, his brother Hugo and his sisters Elma and Cátia Aveiro.

== See also ==
- Messi (2014 film)
- List of association football films
