= Marcel Mettelsiefen =

German documentary filmmaker

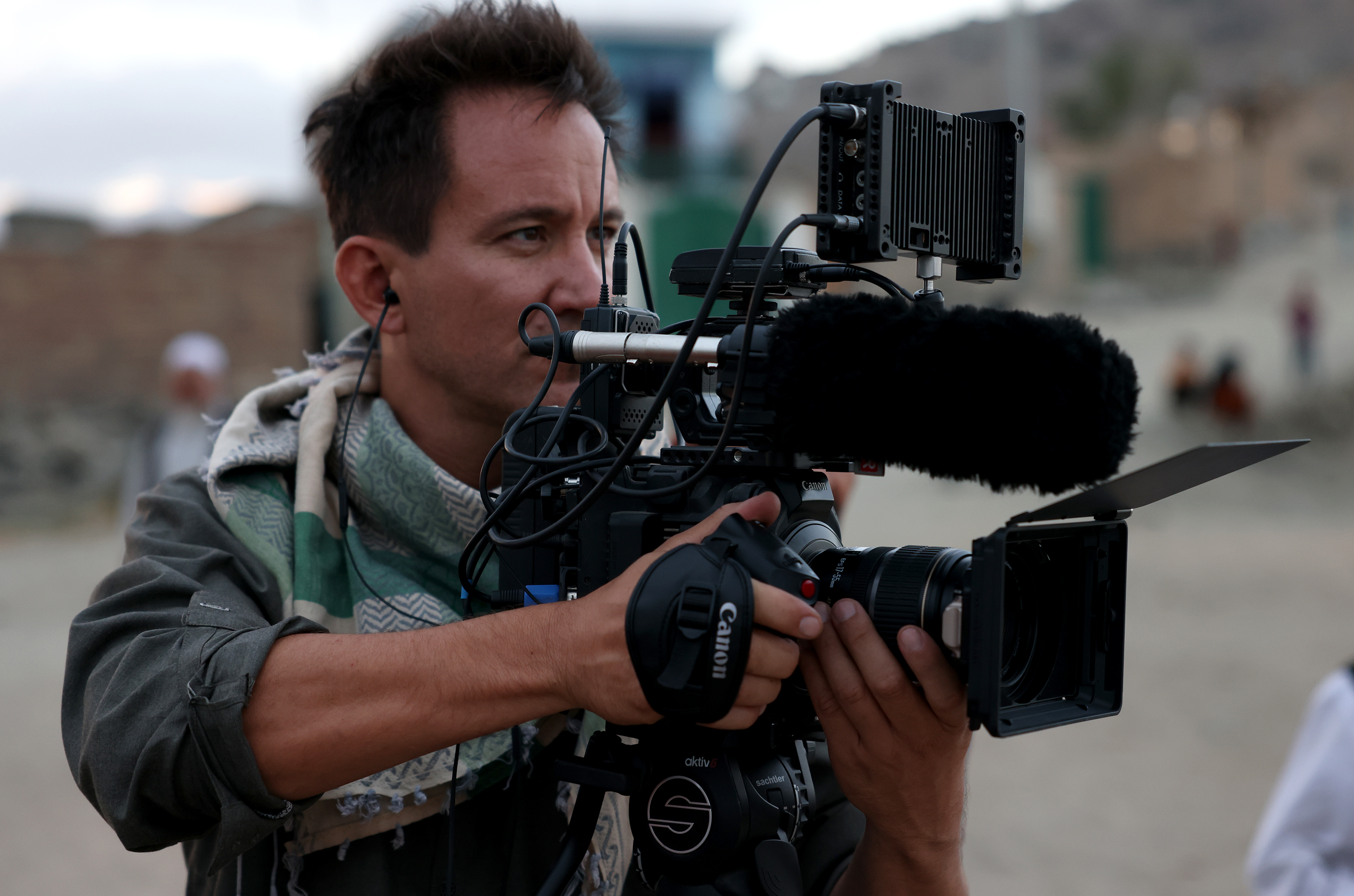
- Mettelsiefen in 2022
- Born: 1978 (age 47–48); Munich, West Germany
- Occupations: Documentary filmmaker, cinematographer, producer
- Years active: 2012–present
- Notable work: Watani: My Homeland, Children of The Taliban, In Her Hands

Marcel Mettelsiefen (born 1978) is a German documentary filmmaker. He has won six BAFTA awards and four Emmy awards, and was nominated for an Oscar in 2017 for Watani: My Homeland in the category of Best Documentary Short. In 2023, he won two BAFTA's for Children of the Taliban. In the same year, In Her Hands, was nominated for three Emmy awards, and won the award for Outstanding Politics & Government Documentary.

Mettelsiefen has a background in photo journalism and has reported from the Middle East and Afghanistan, and South America.

Mettelsiefen studied political science and medicine at the Humboldt University in Berlin.

== Career ==
Mettelsiefen was born in Munich to a German father and an Ecuadorian mother and began taking photographs after graduating from high school. He came to photojournalism through his work for the magazine Zenith – Zeitschrift für den Orient, founded in 1998.

In early 2000, he traveled to Israel and the Palestinian Territories, photographing for the Associated Press news agency. After his return, he began working for the news German Press news agency, for which he reported from crisis areas such as Afghanistan (2001), Iraq (2003) and Haiti (2004).

In addition to his work as a photographer, Mettelsiefen studied politics and medicine at the FU Berlin. In 2008, he went to Afghanistan for 14 months, where he started a cooperation with Spiegel correspondent Christoph Reuter from Kabul.

At the beginning of the Arab Spring, Mettelsiefen traveled to the besieged areas in Egypt and Libya for the news magazine Der Spiegel. From 2011 to 2014, he travelled undercover to Syria more than 28 times and produced numerous reports and short documentaries for which he received numerous international awards, including the Emmy Award, Bafta, Grierson and the Dupont Award.

One of Mettelsiefen's films is the short documentary Watani: My Homeland, which tells the story of children in war-torn Syria. Over a period of three years, Marcel documented the life of a Syrian mother and her four young children in the besieged city of Aleppo. The film was nominated for an Academy Award in 2017 and won a Peabody Award, a Grierson Award, and an Emmy Award.

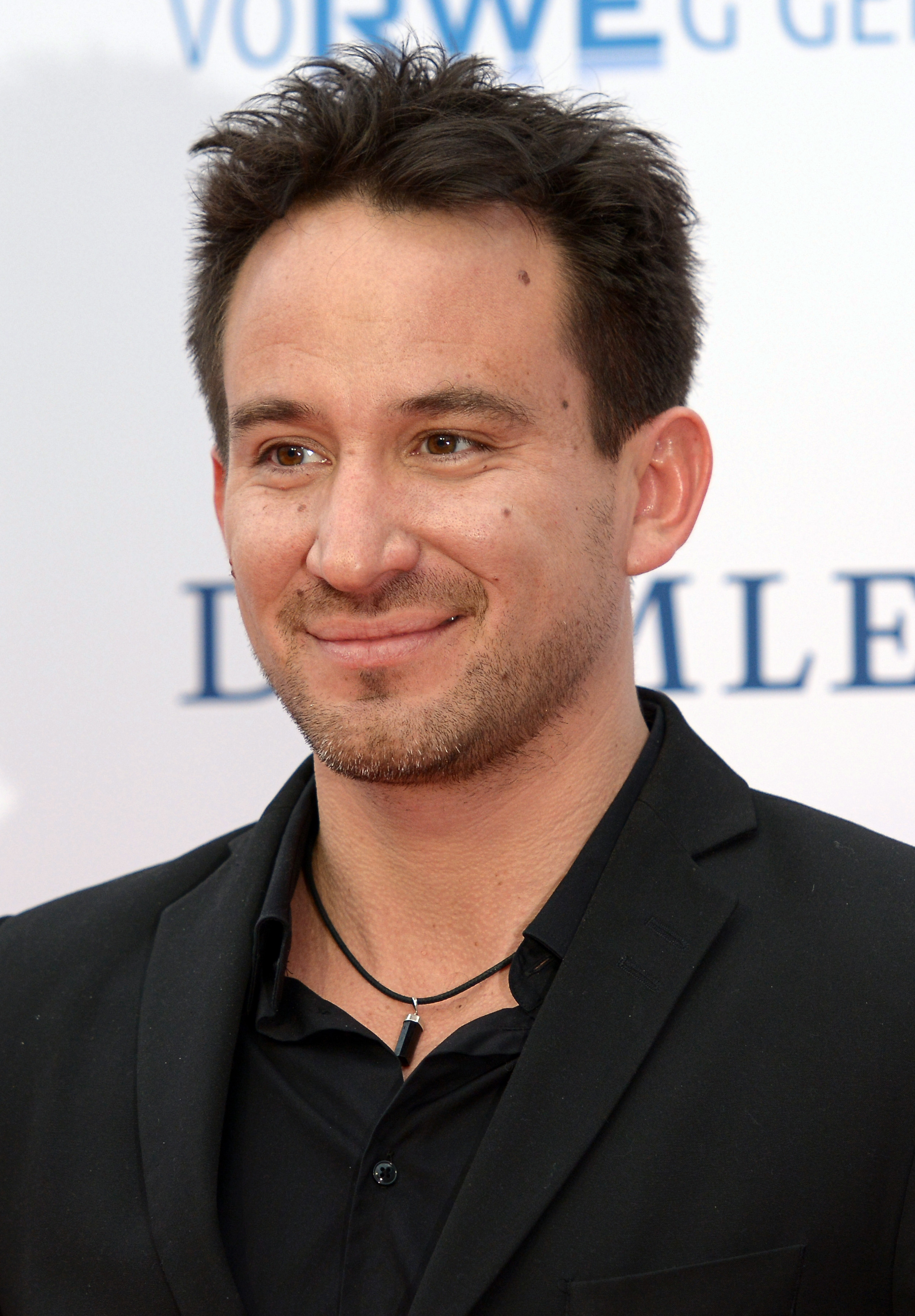
Mettelsiefen in 2015

In his four-part documentary series "Afghanistan – The Wounded Land", Mettelsiefen combines archival footage with first-hand testimonials from Afghans.

Children of the Taliban followed a cinematic account of the lives of children in Afghanistan told through the lens and stories of four young children.

His feature documentary In Her Hands premiered on the opening weekend of the Toronto Film Festival 2022 and was sold to Netflix.

In 2023, Mettelsiefen released Tanja, a documentary about Tanja Nijmeijer, a Dutch woman named who was once part of the Revolutionary Armed Forces of Colombia (FARC). The film, according to Mettelsiefen, is meant to depict her as a strong but not necessarily likeable woman and a victim of male chauvinism. Mettelsiefen first met Nijmeijer in the early 2010s, while reporting on the Colombian peace process on behalf of Der Spiegel, but he did not secure enough funds and support for a documentary on her until 2019. In his original draft, the film would "hide" her at first and describe her indirectly through interviews with other people, then show her on camera midway. However, his editors rejected that idea.

== Filmography ==
- 2024 state of rage
- 2023 A Second Shot
- 2023 Tanja
- 2022 Children of the Taliban
- 2022 In Her Hands
- 2021 I Want My Country Back
- 2020 El conserje
- 2019 Afghanistan – The Wounded Land (TV Series documentary) (4 episodes)
- 2019 Cajun Navy
- 2016 Watani: My Homeland (Documentary short)
- 2016 Slum Britain: 50 Years On (TV Movie documentary)
- 2016 Children on the Frontline: The Escape (TV Movie documentary)
- 2014–2016 Frontline (TV Series documentary) (2 episodes)
- 2014 Unreported World (TV Series documentary) (1 episode)
- 2014 Syria: Children on the Frontline (TV Movie documentary)

== Awards and nominations ==
- Winner: Emmy Outstanding Politics & Government Documentary – In Her Hands. (2023)
- Nominated: Emmy Outstanding Direction Documentary – In Her Hands. (2023)
- Nominated: Emmy Outstanding Editing Documentary – In Her Hands. (2023)
- Nominated: Peabody Award Best Documentary – Children of The Taliban. (2023)
- Winner: BAFTA Best Documentary – Children of The Taliban. (2023)
- Winner: BAFTA Craft for Best Cinematography – Children of The Taliban. (2023)
- Winner: Grimme Preis – Afghanistan – A Wounded Land.
- Nominated: The Rose d’Or Award – Afghanistan – Ein Verwundetes Land.
- Winner: Rory Peck Award – Children on the Frontline: The Escape, Sony Impact Award for Current Affairs.
- Nominated: Academy Award for Best Documentary (Short Subject) – Watani, My Homeland (2016)
- Winner: Prix Europa prize for Best TV Programme about Cultural Diversity – Children of Syria
- Winner: Prix Italia – Best TV Documentary, Current Affairs – Children on the Frontline, Syria (2014)
- Winner: Cinema for Peace Award – Children on the Frontline, Syria (2014)
- Winner: Cinema for Peace – Children on the Frontline, Syria (2014)
- Winner: International Emmy – Children on the Frontline, Syria (2014)
- Winner: Grimme Preis – Children on the Frontline, Syria (2014)
- Winner: Bayeux-Calvados Award – Long-Format Television – Children on the Frontline, Syria (2014)
- Winner: Grierson Award – Best Documentary On An International Contemporary Theme – Children on the Frontline, Syria (2014)
- Winner: One World Media – Television Award
- Winner: Edinburgh TV Awards – Producer/Director Debut Award
- Winner: RTS – International Documentary
- Winner: BAFTA Current Affairs – Children on the Frontline, Syria (2014)
- Winner: BAFTA CRAFT – Factual Photography – Children on the Frontline, Syria (2014)
- Winner: Peabody Awards – Documentary – Children on the Frontline, Syria (2014)
- Winner: Amnesty International Media Awards – Gaby Rado Memorial Award – Children on the Frontline, Syria (2014)
- Nominated: BAFTA CRAFT – Best Newcomer (Marcel Mettelsefien)
- Nominated: Amnesty's Media Award – Documentary – Children on the Frontline, Syria (2014)
- Nominated: Frontline Awards – Broadcast – Children on the Frontline, Syria (2014)
- Winner: Hanns-Joachim-Friedrichs-Preis – Agony in Aleppo (2014)
- Winner: Edward Murrow Award – Homs a City Under Siege (2012)
