= Fire in the Night (2013 film) =

2013 film

- Film poster
- Directed by: Anthony Wonke
- Written by: Stephen McGinty
- Release date: 20 June 2013
- Running time: 94 minutes
- Country: United Kingdom
- Language: English

Fire in the Night is a 2013 British documentary film about the Piper Alpha disaster made by Berriff McGinty Films which had been set up by Stephen McGinty, author of the 2008 book Fire in the Night and Paul Berriff, a film maker and cameraman who had witnessed the events of the disaster. It was directed by Anthony Wonke. It won a Scottish BAFTA as Best Single Documentary and the Audience Award at the 2013 Edinburgh International Film Festival. It was first shown on television on 9 July 2013 on BBC Two, three days after the 25th anniversary of the disaster.
