= Brad Schiff =

American stop-motion animation supervisor

Brad Schiff is an American stop-motion animation supervisor. Known for his works at Laika as an animation supervisor in acclaimed films such as ParaNorman (2012), The Boxtrolls (2014) and Kubo and the Two Strings for which he received an Academy Award for Best Visual Effects nomination at the 89th Academy Awards.

== Filmography ==
Year	Title	Notes
1995	No More Mr. Nice Guy	(Short) (animator)
1998	Space Bunnies Must Die!	(Video Game) (animator)
1999	The PJs	(TV Series) (animator)
1998-1999	Celebrity Deathmatch	(TV Series) (animator - 10 episodes)
2001	Gary & Mike	(TV Series) (animator - 1 episode)
2005	Corpse Bride	(animator)
2009	Coraline	(animator)
2009	Fantastic Mr. Fox	(key animator)
2012	ParaNorman	(animation supervisor)
2014	The Boxtrolls	(animation supervisor)
2016	Kubo and the Two Strings	(animation supervisor)
2018	Isle of Dogs	(animation supervisor: Sushi scene)
2019	Missing Link	(animation supervisor)

== Awards ==
- 2001: Primetime Emmy Award for Outstanding Individual Achievement in Animation - Gary & Mike
- 2013: Visual Effects Society Award for Outstanding Animation in an Animated Feature Motion Picture - ParaNorman
- 2015: Visual Effects Society Award for Outstanding Animation in an Animated Feature Motion Picture - The Boxtrolls
- 2017: Visual Effects Society Award for Outstanding Animation in an Animated Feature Motion Picture - Kubo and the Two Strings
- 2019: Visual Effects Society Award for Outstanding Animation in an Animated Feature Motion Picture - Missing Link
- 2016: Academy Award for Best Visual Effects (nominated) - Kubo and the Two Strings
