= The Croods (franchise) =

DreamWorks Animation media franchise

- Created by: Kirk DeMicco; Chris Sanders; John Cleese
- Owners: DreamWorks Animation (Universal Pictures)
- Years: 2013–present

Films and television
- Films: The Croods (2013); The Croods: A New Age (2020)
- Animated series: Dawn of the Croods (2015–2017); The Croods: Family Tree (2021–2023)

Games
- Video games: The Croods: Prehistoric Party! (2013); The Croods (2013)

Audio
- Soundtracks: The Croods; The Croods: A New Age

The Croods is an American media franchise by DreamWorks Animation. The franchise began with the 2013 film The Croods, and has since grown to include a sequel, The Croods: A New Age; two television series, Dawn of the Croods and The Croods: Family Tree; and two video games. Set in the fictional prehistoric "Croodaceous" time period which is roamed by a series of bizarre hybrid animals, the franchise follows the eponymous cavepeople family as they travel through the dangerous but exotic lands in search of a new home after their previous home was destroyed.

== Feature films ==
Film	U.S. release date	Director(s)	Story by	Screenwriter(s)	Producer(s)
The Croods	March 22, 2013	Chris Sanders & Kirk DeMicco	John Cleese, Kirk DeMicco & Chris Sanders	Kirk DeMicco & Chris Sanders	Kristine Belson and Jane Hartwell
The Croods: A New Age	November 25, 2020	Joel Crawford	Kirk DeMicco & Chris Sanders	Dan Hageman, Kevin Hageman, Paul Fisher and Bob Logan	Mark Swift

=== The Croods (2013) ===
The Croods is a 2013 American animated adventure comedy film produced by DreamWorks Animation and distributed by 20th Century Fox, set in a fictional prehistoric Pliocene era known as "The Croodaceous" (a prehistoric period which contains fictional prehistoric creatures) when a caveman's position as a "Leader of the Hunt" is threatened by the arrival of a prehistoric genius who comes up with revolutionary new inventions as they trek through a dangerous but exotic land in search of a new home. The film was originally announced in May 2005, under the working title Crood Awakening, originally a stop motion film being made by Aardman Animations.

Chris Sanders took over development of the film in March 2007; however, development of How to Train Your Dragon postponing its original schedule for a year to a then planned March 2012. The film's final title, The Croods, was revealed in May 2009, along with new co-director, Kirk DeMicco. The film features the voices of Nicolas Cage, Emma Stone, Ryan Reynolds, Catherine Keener, Clark Duke, Cloris Leachman, and Randy Thom.

=== The Croods: A New Age (2020) ===
The Croods: A New Age is a 2020 American sequel to the 2013 film The Croods, again produced by DreamWorks Animation and distributed by Universal Pictures, following the Croods after leaving their cave in the first film as they encounter their biggest threat since leaving the cave: another family called the Bettermans.

Originally scheduled for a November 3, 2017 release by 20th Century Fox, but was moved to December 22, 2017. On August 9, 2016, nearing Comcast and NBCUniversal's impending acquisition of DreamWorks Animation, Fox removed the film from the release schedule, with Blue Sky's Ferdiand taking over its release date. The film would instead be released by Universal, sometime in 2018. On November 11, 2016, DreamWorks announced that production for the sequel was cancelled, however in September 2017, Universal and DreamWorks announced the film was back in production with a scheduled September 2020 release, but the release date was moved to November 25, 2020 due to the COVID-19 pandemic. Along with the returning cast of the first film, the film features the voices of Peter Dinklage, Leslie Mann, and Kelly Marie Tran, Tran replacing Kat Dennings.

== Television series ==
Series	Seasons	Episodes	First released	Last released	Showrunner(s)	Network(s)
Dawn of the Croods	4	52	December 24, 2015	July 7, 2017	Brendan Hay	Netflix
The Croods: Family Tree	8	52	September 23, 2021	November 9, 2023	Mark Banker and Todd Grimes	Hulu/Peacock

=== Dawn of the Croods (2015–2017) ===
A 2D-animated web television series serving as a prequel to the film, titled Dawn of the Croods, aired on Netflix between December 24, 2015 and July 7, 2017. A total of 88 episodes each consisting of 2 11-minute segments were released. The cast featured new voice actors for the characters of Grug (Dan Milano), Ugga (Cree Summer), Eep (Stephanie Lemelin), Thunk (A.J. LoCascio), Sandy (Grey Griffin), Gran (Laraine Newman), and Guy (Dominic Catrambone). The first three episodes were animated in Toon Boom Harmony by Vancouver's Bardel Entertainment. DreamWorks soon found that Harmony was not the best fit for animating scenes that contained multiple characters at once. The rest of the episodes were traditionally hand-drawn by South Korean studios: EMation, NE4U, and Dong Woo Animation. On July 9, 2017, executive producer Hay confirmed that the then recently released fourth season of Dawn of the Croods had been its last.

=== The Croods: Family Tree (2021–2023) ===
On August 31, DreamWorks announced a CGI animated series titled The Croods: Family Tree, based on The Croods: A New Age and will be streaming September 23 on Hulu and Peacock. Tran reprises her role as Dawn, while A.J. LoCascio reprises his role as Thunk from Dawn of the Croods. The new voice cast features, Amy Landecker as Ugga, Kiff VandenHeuvel as Grug, Ally Dixon as Eep, Artemis Pebdani as Gran, Darin Brooks as Guy, Matthew Waterson as Phil, and Amy Rosoff as Hope. Mark Banker (from Go, Dog, Go!) and Todd Grimes (from The Epic Tales of Captain Underpants) serve as executive producers and showrunners for the series.

== Cast and characters ==
List indicators
- A dark gray cell indicates the character did not appear in that installment.
- A ^{Y} indicates an actor or actress voiced a younger version of their character.

Characters	Feature films		Video game	Short films			Television series	
Characters	The Croods	The Croods: A New Age	The Croods: Prehistoric Party!	Belt's Cave Journal	Dear Diary: World's First Pranks	Family Movie Night: Little Red Bronana Bread	Dawn of the Croods	The Croods: Family Tree
Grug Crood	Nicolas Cage	Nicolas Cage	Chris Parson		Nicolas Cage		Dan Milano	Kiff VandenHeuvel
Eep Crood	Emma Stone	Emma Stone	Stephanie Lemelin		Emma Stone	Emma Stone	Stephanie Lemelin	Ally Dixon
Guy	Ryan Reynolds	Ryan Reynolds	Dominic Catrambone	Ryan Reynolds	Ryan Reynolds		Dominic Catrambone	Darin Brooks
Guy	Ryan Reynolds	Gabriel Jack^{Y}	Dominic Catrambone	Ryan Reynolds	Ryan Reynolds		Dominic Catrambone	Darin Brooks
Ugga Crood	Catherine Keener	Catherine Keener	Elizabeth Keener		Catherine Keener		Cree Summer	Amy Landecker
Thunk Crood	Clark Duke	Clark Duke	A.J. LoCascio		Clark Duke	Clark Duke	A.J. LoCascio	A.J. LoCascio
Gran	Cloris Leachman	Cloris Leachman	Jodi Carlisle		Cloris Leachman	Silent role	Laraine Newman	Artemis Pebdani
Sandy Crood	Randy Thom	Kailey Crawford	Jessica DiCicco				Grey Griffin	Dee Bradley Baker
Belt	Chris Sanders	Chris Sanders	Chris Sanders	Chris Sanders	Silent cameo		Chris Sanders	Dee Bradley Baker
Phil Betterman		Peter Dinklage			Peter Dinklage			Matthew Waterson
Hope Betterman		Leslie Mann			Leslie Mann	Leslie Mann		Amy Rosoff
Dawn Betterman		Kelly Marie Tran			Kelly Marie Tran	Kelly Marie Tran		Kelly Marie Tran Abby Trott
Sash		James Ryan			Silent cameo			Dee Bradley Baker
Shaman Monkey		Januel Mercado						
Bud							Dan Milano	
Womp							Dan Milano	
Pat							Cree Summer	
Clip							Cree Summer	
Pup Howler							Cree Summer	
Baitsy							A.J. LoCascio	
Steve							A.J. LoCascio	
Lerk							Grey Griffin	
One-Eyed Amber							Laraine Newman	
Mosh							Laraine Newman	
Pram							Laraine Newman	
Bulk							Dee Bradley Baker	
Squawk							Dee Bradley Baker	
Bearowl							Dee Bradley Baker	
Moler Bear							Dee Bradley Baker	
Tyrannaconda							Dee Bradley Baker	
Mow							Dee Bradley Baker	
Earl							Dee Bradley Baker	
Old Man Root							Dee Bradley Baker	
Yelp							Dee Bradley Baker	
Sulk							Dominic Catrambone	
Kevin							Dominic Catrambone	
Fan							Dominic Catrambone	
Night Mare							Dominic Catrambone	
Ow the Dentist							Dominic Catrambone	
Bag							Dominic Catrambone	
Little Mantrap							Jim Cummings	
Meep Boor							Ana Gasteyer	
Crud							Thomas Lennon	
Munk							Thomas Lennon	
Snoot Boor							Chris Parnell	
Gurg							Christian Slater	
Hwam								Tru Valentino

== Crew ==
Role	The Croods	The Croods: A New Age
Role	2013	2020
Director(s)	Chris Sanders; Kirk DeMicco	Joel Crawford
Producer(s)	Kristine Belson; Jane Hartwell	Mark Swift
Writer(s)	Screenplay: Kirk DeMicco; Chris Sanders Story: John Cleese; Kirk DeMicco; Chris Sanders	Screenplay: Dan Hageman; Kevin Hageman; Paul Fisher; Bob Logan Story: Kirk DeMicco; Chris Sanders
Composer(s)	Alan Silvestri	Mark Mothersbaugh
Editor(s)	Eric Dapkewicz; Darren T. Holmes	James Ryan
Studio(s)	DreamWorks Animation	DreamWorks Animation
Distributor(s)	20th Century Fox	Universal Pictures
Running time	1hr 39mins	1hr 35mins

=== Additional crew ===
TV series	Detail				
TV series	Composer	Production companies	Distributor	Network	Running time
Dawn of the Croods	Gabriel Mann, Rebecca Kneubuhl	DreamWorks Animation Television	NBCUniversal Television and Streaming, Netflix	Netflix	22 minutes per episode
The Croods: Family Tree	Hannah Parrott	DreamWorks Animation Television	NBCUniversal Television and Streaming	Hulu/Peacock	22 minutes per episode

== Reception ==
=== Box office performance ===
Film	Release date	Box office gross			Budget	Ref.
Film	Release date	North America	Other territories	Worldwide	Budget	Ref.
The Croods	March 22, 2013	$187,168,425	$400,036,894	$587,205,319	$135 million	
The Croods: A New Age	November 25, 2020	$58,568,815	$157,337,000	$215,905,815	$65 million	
Total		$245,737,240	$557,373,894	$803,111,134	$200 million	

=== Critical and public response ===
Critical and public response of The Croods films
Film	Critical		Public	
Film	Rotten Tomatoes	Metacritic	CinemaScore	PostTrak
The Croods	71% (142 reviews)	55 (30 reviews)	A	—N/a
The Croods: A New Age	76% (157 reviews)	56 (30 reviews)	A	83%

== Video games ==
A video game based on the series, titled The Croods: Prehistoric Party!, was released on March 19, 2013. Developed by Torus Games, and published by D3 Publisher, it was adapted for Wii U, Wii, Nintendo 3DS, and Nintendo DS. The game enables players to take the members of the Croods family on an adventure through 30 party style mini games. It received mainly negative reviews.

A mobile game, titled The Croods, which is a village-building game, was developed and published by Rovio, the creator of Angry Birds. It was released on March 14, 2013, to the iOS and Android platforms. It received negative reviews from critics, with Metacritic giving it a 40 out of 100.

== Chronology ==
Chronological order of The Croods' franchise history:

1. Dawn of the Croods (2015–2017)
2. The Croods (2013)
3. Dawn of the Croods series finale (2017)
4. The Croods: A New Age (2020)
5. The Croods: Family Tree (2021–2023)
