= Visual Effects Society Award for Outstanding Visual Effects in an Animated Feature =

Animation award

The Visual Effects Society Award for Outstanding Visual Effects in an Animated Feature is one of the annual awards given by the Visual Effects Society starting from 2008.

== Winners and nominees ==
=== 2000s ===
Year	Film	Nominee(s)
2008	WALL-E	Andrew Stanton, Jim Morris, Lindsey Collins, Nigel Hardwidge
2008	Bolt	Chris Williams, Byron Howard, John Murrah, Doug Bennett
2008	Kung Fu Panda	Markus Manninen, Dan Wagner, Alex Parkinson, Raymond Zibach
2008	Roadside Romeo	Pankaj Khandpur, Sherry Bharda, Shrirang Sathayem Suhael Merchant
2008	Waltz With Bashir	Yoni Goodman, Yael Nahlieli
2009	Up	Pete Docter, Jonas Rivera, Steve May, Gary Bruins
2009	9	Ken Duncan, Jinko Gotoh, Daryl Graham, Joe Ksander
2009	Cloudy with a Chance of Meatballs	Pete Nash, Chris Juen, Alan Hawkins, Mike Ford
2009	Coraline	Henry Selick, Claire Jennings
2009	Ice Age: Dawn of the Dinosaurs	Melvin Tan, Galen Chu, Jeff Gabor, Anthony Nisi

=== 2010s ===
Year	Film	Nominee(s)
2010	How to Train Your Dragon	Simon Otto, Craig Ring, Bonnie Arnold
2010	Legend of the Guardians: The Owls of Ga'Hoole	Zareh Naibandian, Simon Whiteley, Eric Leighton, Alex Weight
2010	Shrek Forever After	Jason Reisig, Doug Cooper, Gina Shay, Teresa Cheng
2010	Tangled	Clay Kaytis, John Kahrs, Glen Keane, Roy Conli
2010	Toy Story 3	Lee Unkrich, Darla K. Anderson, Guido Quaroni, Michael Fong
2011	Rango	Tim Alexander, Hal Hickel, Jacqui Lopez, Katie Lynch
2011	The Adventures of Tintin	Jamie Beard, Joe Letteri, Meredith Meyer-Nichols, Eileen Moran
2011	Arthur Christmas	Doug Ikeler, Chris Juen, Alan Short, Mandy Tankenson
2011	Kung Fu Panda 2	Melissa Cobb, Alex Parkinson, Jennifer Yuh Nelson, Raymond Zibach
2011	Puss in Boots	Joe M. Aguilar, Guillaume Aretos, Ken Bielenberg, Chris Miller
2012	Brave	Mark Andrews, Steve May, Katherine Sarafian, Bill Wise
2012	Hotel Transylvania	Lydia Bottegoni, James Crossley, Mike Ford, Daniel Kramer
2012	ParaNorman	Chris Butler, Sam Fell, Travis Knight, Brad Schiff
2012	Rise of the Guardians	Nancy Bernstein, David Prescott, Peter Ramsey, Christina Steinberg
2012	Wreck-It Ralph	Sean Jenkins, Scott Kersavage, Rich Moore, Clark Spencer
2013	Frozen	Chris Buck, Jennifer Lee, Peter Del Vecho, Lino Di Salvo
2013	Cloudy with a Chance of Meatballs 2	Peter Nash, Michael Ford, Chris Juen, Mandy Tankenson
2013	The Croods	Jane Hartwell, Chris Sanders, Kirk DeMicco, Markus Manninen
2013	Despicable Me 2	Chris Meledandri, Janet Healy, Chris Renaud, Pierre Coffin
2013	Monsters University	Kori Rae, Sanjay Bakshi, Jon Reisch, Scott Clark
2014	Big Hero 6	Don Hall, Chris Williams, Roy Conli, Zach Parrish
2014	The Boxtrolls	Travis Knight, Anthony Stacchi, Graham Annable, Brad Schiff
2014	How to Train Your Dragon 2	Bonnie Arnold, Dean DeBlois, Dave Walvoord, Simon Otto
2014	The Lego Movie	Chris McKay, Amber Naismith, Jim Dodd, David Williams
2014	Rio 2	Carlos Saldanha, Bruce Anderson, John C. Donkin, Kirk Garfield
2015	The Good Dinosaur	Sanjay Bakshi, Denise Ream, Michael Venturini, Jon Reisch
2015	Anomalisa	Derek Smith, Rosa Tran, Joe Passarelli, John Joyce
2015	Hotel Transylvania 2	Karl Herbst, Skye Lyons, Alan Hawkins, Genndy Tartakovsky
2015	Inside Out	Michael Fong, Jonas Rivera, Victor Navone, Paul Mendoza
2015	The Peanuts Movie	Steve Martino, Michael J. Travers, Nick Bruno, Scott Carroll
2016	Kubo and the Two Strings	Travis Knight, Arianne Sutner, Steve Emerson, Brad Schiff
2016	Finding Dory	Angus MacLane, Lindsey Collins, John Halstead, Chris J. Chapman
2016	Moana	Kyle Odermatt, Nicole P. Hearon, Hank Driskill, Ian Gooding
2016	The Little Prince	Mark Osborne, Jinko Gotoh, Pascal Bertrand, Jamie Caliri
2016	Zootopia	Scott Kersavage, Bradford S. Simonsen, David Goetz, Ernest J. Petti
2017	Coco	Lee Unkrich, Darla K. Anderson, David Ryu, Michael K. O'Brien
2017	Captain Underpants: The First Epic Movie	David Soren, Mark Swift, Mireille Soria, David Dulac
2017	Cars 3	Brian Fee, Kevin Reher, Michael Fong, Jon Reisch
2017	Despicable Me 3	Pierre Coffin, Chris Meledandri, Kyle Balda, Eric Guillon
2017	The Lego Batman Movie	Rob Coleman, Amber Naismith, Grant Freckelton, Damien Gray
2017	The Lego Ninjago Movie	Gregory Jowle, Fiona Childton, Miles Green, Kim Taylor
2018	Spider-Man: Into the Spider-Verse	Joshua Beveridge, Christian Hejnal, Danny Dimian, Bret St. Clair
2018	Dr. Seuss' The Grinch	Pierre Leduc, Janet Healy, Bruno Chauffard, Milo Riccarand
2018	Incredibles 2	Brad Bird, John Walker, Rick Sayre, Bill Watral
2018	Isle of Dogs	Mark Waring, Jeremy Dawson, Tim Ledbury, Lev Kolobov
2018	Ralph Breaks the Internet	Scott Kersavage, Bradford Simonsen, Ernest J. Petti, Cory Loftis
2019	Missing Link	Brad Schiff, Travis Knight, Steve Emerson, Benoit Dubuc
2019	Frozen 2	Steve Goldberg, Peter Del Vecho, Mark Hammel, Michael Giaimo
2019	Klaus	Sergio Pablos, Matthew Teevan, Marcin Jakubowski, Szymon Biernacki
2019	The Lego Movie 2: The Second Part	David Burgess, Tim Smith, Mark Theriault. John Rix
2019	Toy Story 4	Josh Cooley, Mark Nielsen, Bob Moyer, Gary Bruins

=== 2020s ===
Year	Film	Nominee(s)
2020	Soul	Pete Docter, Dana Murray, Michael Fong, Bill Watral
2020	Onward	Dan Scanlon, Kori Rae, Sanjay Bakshi, Vincent Serritella
2020	Over the Moon	Glen Keane, Gennie Rim, Céline Desrumaux, David Alexander Smith
2020	The Croods: A New Age	Joel Crawford, Mark Swift, Betsyf Nofsinger, Jakob Hjort Jensen
2020	Trolls World Tour	Walt Dohrn, Gina Shay, Kendal Cronkhite-Shaindlin, Matt Baer
2021	Encanto	Scott Kersavage, Bradford Simonsen, Thaddeus P. Miller, Ian Gooding
2021	Luca	Enrico Casarosa, Andrea Warren, David Ryu, Jon Reisch
2021	The Mitchells vs. the Machines	Alan Hawkins, Carey A. Smith, Mike Lasker, Nicola Lavender
2021	Raya and the Last Dragon	Kyle Odermatt, Osnat Shurer, Kelsey Hurley, Paul Felix
2021	Sing 2	Patrick Delage, Nathalie Vancauwenberghe, Christophe Lourdelet, Boris Jacq
2022	Guillermo del Toro's Pinocchio	Aaron Weintraub, Jeffrey Schaper, Cameron Carson, Emma Gorbey
2022	The Bad Guys	Pierre Perifel, Damon Ross, Matt Baer, JP Sans
2022	Mad God	Chris Morley, Phil Tippett, Ken Rogerson, Tom Gibbons
2022	The Sea Beast	Joshua Beveridge, Christian Hejnal, Stirling Duguid, Spencer Lueders
2022	Strange World	Steve Goldberg, Laurie Au, Mark Hammel, Mehrdad Isvandi
2022	Turning Red	Domee Shi, Lindsey Collins, Danielle Feinberg, Dave Hale
2023	Spider-Man: Across the Spider-Verse	Alan Hawkins, Christian Hejnal, Michael Lasker, Matt Hausman
2023	Chicken Run: Dawn of the Nugget	Jon Biggins, Jim Lewis, Charles Copping, Matthew Perry
2023	Elemental	Peter Sohn, Denise Ream, Sanjay Bakshi, Stephen Marshall
2023	Nimona	Archie Donato, Yancy Lindquist, Theodore Ty, Anthony Kemp
2023	Teenage Mutant Ninja Turtles: Mutant Mayhem	Matthieu Rouxel, Marie Balland, Jacques Daigle, Vincent Leroy
2024	The Wild Robot	Chris Sanders, Jeff Hermann, Jeff Budsberg, Jacob Hjort Jensen
2024	Inside Out 2	Kelsey Mann, Mark Nielsen, Sudeep Rangaswamy, Bill Watral
2024	Moana 2	Carlos Cabral, Tucker Gilmore, Ian Gooding, Gabriela Hernandez
2024	Transformers One	Frazer Churchill, Fiona Chilton, Josh Cooley, Stephen King
2024	Ultraman: Rising	Hayden Jones, Sean M. Murphy, Shannon Tindle, Mathieu Vig
2025	KPop Demon Hunters	Joshua Beveridge, Jacky Priddle, Benjamin Hendricks, Clara Chan
2025	The Bad Guys 2	Pierre Perifel, Damon Ross, Matt Baer, Benjamin Willis
2025	Zootopia 2	Gregory Smith, Laurie Au, Marlon West, Shweta Viswanathan
2025	In Your Dreams	Sacha Kapijimpangan Carey Smith, Nicola Lavender, Steve Pilcher
2025	Elio	Claudia Chung Sanii, Mary Alice Drumm, Harley Jessup, Dave Quirus
