= Annie Award for Outstanding Achievement for Animated Effects in an Animated Production =

Film award category

Annie Award for Animated Effects in an Animated Production
- Awarded for: Excellence in animated effects
- Country: United States
- Presented by: ASIFA-Hollywood
- First award: 1997
- Currently held by: Filippo Macari, Nicola Finizio, Simon Lewis, Naoki Kato, and Daniel La Chapelle KPop Demon Hunters (2025)
- Website: annieawards.org

The Annie Award for Animated Effects in an Animated Production is an Annie Award given annually to the best animated effects in animation feature productions. It was first presented at the 25th Annie Awards.

From 2011 to 2016, the category Outstanding Achievement for Animated Effects in a Live Action Production was presented to reward only the animated effects for live-action productions.

== Winners and nominees ==
± = live-action production

=== 1990s ===
Best Individual Achievement for Effects Animation

Year	Recipient(s)	Film
1997 (25th)
1997 (25th)	Mauro Maressa	Hercules
1997 (25th)	John Allan Armstrong	Cats Don't Dance
1997 (25th)	Bob Simmons	Cats Don't Dance
1997 (25th)	Jay Redd	Contact ±
1998 (26th)
1998 (26th)	David Tidgwell	Mulan
1998 (26th)	Jerome Chen	Godzilla ±
1998 (26th)	Michel Gagné	Quest for Camelot
1998 (26th)	Peter Matheson	Anastasia
1999 (27th)
1999 (27th)	Allen Foster	The Iron Giant
1999 (27th)	Peter de Mund	Tarzan
1999 (27th)	Michel Gagné	The Iron Giant
1999 (27th)	Joel Krasnove	The Angry Beavers
1999 (27th)	Jamie Lloyd	The Prince of Egypt

=== 2000s ===
Best Individual Achievement for Effects Animation

Year	Recipient(s)	Film
2000 (28th)
2000 (28th)	Ted C. Kierscey	Fantasia 2000
2000 (28th)	Robert Bredon	Stuart Little ±
2000 (28th)	Julian Hynes	Titan A.E.
2000 (28th)	Simon O'Connor	Dinosaur
2000 (28th)	Doug Ikeler	The Road to El Dorado
2001 (29th)
2001 (29th)	Arnauld Lamorlette	Shrek
2001 (29th)	Michel Gagné	Osmosis Jones
2001 (29th)	Marlon West	Atlantis: The Lost Empire
2002 (30th)
2002 (30th)	Yancy Lindquist	Spirit: Stallion of the Cimarron
2002 (30th)	Robert Bennett	Lilo & Stitch
2002 (30th)	Garrett Wren	Lilo & Stitch
2002 (30th)	Jamie Lloyd	Spirit: Stallion of the Cimarron
2002 (30th)	Kee Nam Suong	Treasure Planet
2003 (31st)
2003 (31st)	Martin Nguyen	Finding Nemo
2003 (31st)	Dave Stephens	The Haunted Mansion
2003 (31st)	Justin Ritter	Finding Nemo
2003 (31st)	Jason Wolbert	Brother Bear
2003 (31st)	Madoka Yasuet	Piglet's Big Movie

Outstanding Achievement for Animated Effects

Year	Recipient(s)	Film
2004 (32nd)
2004 (32nd)	Martin Nguyen	The Incredibles
2004 (32nd)	Scott Cegielski	Shark Tale
2004 (32nd)	Hisashi Ezura	Ghost in the Shell 2: Innocence
2004 (32nd)	Matt Hausman	The Polar Express
2004 (32nd)	Jonathan Gibbs	Shrek 2
2005 (33rd)
2005 (33rd)	Jason Wen	Wallace & Gromit: The Curse of the Were-Rabbit
2005 (33rd)	Dale Mayeda	Chicken Little
2005 (33rd)	Matt Baer	Madagascar
2005 (33rd)	Rick Glumac	Madagascar
2005 (33rd)	Martin Usiak	Madagascar
2006 (34th)
2006 (34th)	Scott Cegielski	Flushed Away
2006 (34th)	Keith Klohn	Cars
2006 (34th)	Erdem Taylan	Cars
2006 (34th)	David Stephens	Open Season
2006 (34th)	John David Thornton	Ice Age: The Meltdown
2007 (35th)
2007 (35th)	Deborah Carlson	Surf's Up
2007 (35th)	Gary Bruins	Ratatouille
2007 (35th)	Jon Reisch	Ratatouille
2007 (35th)	Ryan Laney	Spider-Man 3 ±
2007 (35th)	James Mansfield	How to Hook Up Your Home Theater
2008 (36th)
2008 (36th)	Li-Ming Lawrence Lee	Kung Fu Panda
2008 (36th)	Alen Lai	Horton Hears a Who!
2008 (36th)	Fangwei Lee	Madagascar: Escape 2 Africa
2008 (36th)	Kevin Lee	Bolt
2008 (36th)	Enrique Vila	Wall-E
2009 (37th)
2009 (37th)	James Mansfield	The Princess and the Frog
2009 (37th)	Scott Cegielski	Monsters vs. Aliens
2009 (37th)	Alexander Feigin	9
2009 (37th)	Eric Froemling	Up
2009 (37th)	Tom Kluyskens	Cloudy with a Chance of Meatballs

=== 2010s ===
Outstanding Achievement for Animated Effects in an Animated Production

Year	Recipient(s)	Film
2010 (38th)
2010 (38th)	Brett Miller	How to Train Your Dragon
2010 (38th)	Andrew Young Kim	Shrek Forever After
2010 (38th)	Jason Mayer	How to Train Your Dragon
2010 (38th)	Sebastien Quessy	Legend of the Guardians: The Owls of Ga'Hoole
2010 (38th)	Krzysztof Rost	Megamind
2011 (39th)
2011 (39th)	Kevin Romond	The Adventures of Tintin
2011 (39th)	Can Yuksel	Puss in Boots
2011 (39th)	Chase Cooper	Rango
2011 (39th)	Willi Geiger	Rango
2011 (39th)	Dan Lund	Winnie the Pooh
2011 (39th)	Dave Tidgwell	Kung Fu Panda 2
2011 (39th)	Jason Mayer	Kung Fu Panda 2
2011 (39th)	Eric Froemling	Cars 2
2011 (39th)	Jon Reisch	Cars 2
2011 (39th)	Joel Aron	Star Wars: The Clone Wars
2012 (40th)
2012 (40th)	Andy Hayes, Carl Hooper, David Lipton	Rise of the Guardians
2012 (40th)	Andrew Nawrot, Joe Gorski, Grant Laker	ParaNorman
2012 (40th)	Andrew Schneider	Ice Age: Continental Drift
2012 (40th)	Bill Watral, Chris Chapman, Dave Hale, Keith Klohn, Michael K. O'Brien	Brave
2012 (40th)	Brett Albert	Wreck-It Ralph
2012 (40th)	Jihyun Yoon	Madagascar 3: Europe's Most Wanted
2012 (40th)	Joel Aron	Star Wars: The Clone Wars
2013 (41st)
2013 (41st)	Jeff Budsberg, Andre Le Blanc, Louis Flores, Jason Mayer	The Croods
2013 (41st)	Alen Lai, David Quirus, Diego Garzon Sanchez, Ilan Gabai	Epic
2013 (41st)	David Jones	Dragons: Defenders of Berk
2013 (41st)	Joshua Jenny, Jason Johnston, Matthew Wong, Eric Froemling, Enrique Vila	Monsters University
2013 (41st)	Greg Gladstone, Nikita Pavlov, Allen Ruilova, Matt Titus, Can Yuksel	Turbo
2014 (42nd)
2014 (42nd)	Michael Kaschalk, Peter DeMund, David Hutchins, Henrik Falt, John Kosnik	Big Hero 6
2014 (42nd)	James Jackson, Lucas Janin, Tobin Jones, Baptiste Van Opstal, Jason Mayer	How to Train Your Dragon 2
2014 (42nd)	Fangwei Lee, Krzysztof Rost, Jihyun Yoon, Robert Chen	Mr. Peabody & Sherman
2014 (42nd)	Mitul Patel, Nicolas Delbecq, Santosh Khedkar, Yash Argawal	Penguins of Madagascar
2014 (42nd)	Augusto Schillaci, Erich Turner, Bill Konersman, Chris Rasch, Joseph Burnette	The Book of Life
2014 (42nd)	Rick Sevy, Peter Vickery, Kent Estep, Peter Stuart, Ralph Procida	The Boxtrolls
2014 (42nd)	Jayandera Danappal, Matt Ebb, Christian Epunan Hernandez, Danielle Brooks, Raphael Gadot	The Lego Movie
2015 (43rd)
2015 (43rd)	Jon Reisch, Stephen Marshall, Magnus Wrenninge, Michael Hall, Michael K. O'Brien	The Good Dinosaur
2015 (43rd)	Greg Gladstone, Tim Hoff, Mark Newport, Jason Rickwald, Stephen Wood	Home
2015 (43rd)	Chris Logan, Brian Casper, Gavin Baxter, William Eckroat	Hotel Transylvania 2
2015 (43rd)	Amit Baadkar, Dave Hale, Vincent Serritella, Paul Mendoza	Inside Out
2015 (43rd)	Frank Baradat, Antonin Seydoux, Milo Riccarand, Nicolas Brack	Minions
2015 (43rd)	Brice Mallier, Paul Buckley, Brent Droog, Alex Whyte, Jonothan Freisler	The SpongeBob Movie: Sponge Out of Water
2016 (44th)
2016 (44th)	Marlon West, Erin V. Ramos, Blair Pierpont, Ian J. Coony, John M. Kosnik	Moana
2016 (44th)	David Horsley, Eric Wachtman, Timur Khodzhaev, Daniel Leatherdale, Terrance Tornberg	Kubo and the Two Strings
2016 (44th)	Matt Titus, Jeff Budsberg, Carl Hooper, Louis Flores, Jason Mayer	Kung Fu Panda 3
2016 (44th)	Mouloud Oussid	The Red Turtle
2016 (44th)	Thom Wickes, Henrik Fält, Dong Joo Byun, Rattanin Sirinaruemarn, Sam Klock	Zootopia
2017 (45th)
2017 (45th)	Shaun Galinak, Dave Hale, Jason Johnston, Carl Kaphan, Keith Daniel Klohn	Coco
2017 (45th)	Richard Baneham, Thrain Shadbolt, Sam Cole, Pavani Rao Boddapati, Daniele Tosti	Avatar Flight of Passage
2017 (45th)	Amit Baadkar, Greg Gladstone, Stephen Marshall, Jon Reisch, Tim Speltz	Cars 3
2017 (45th)	Bruno Chauffard, Frank Baradat, Nicolas Brack, Milo Riccarand	Despicable Me 3
2017 (45th)	Christopher Hendryx, Dan Lund, Mike Navarro, Hiroaki Narita, Steven Chitwood	Olaf's Frozen Adventure
2018 (46th)
2018 (46th)	Cesar Velazquez, Marie Tollec, Alexander Moaveni, Peter DeMund, Ian J. Coony	Ralph Breaks the Internet
2018 (46th)	Howard Jones, Dave Alex Riddett, Grant Hewlett, Pat Andrew, Elena Vitanza Chiarani	Early Man
2018 (46th)	Patrick Witting, Kiel Gnebba, Spencer Lueders, Joe Pepper, Sam Rickles	Hotel Transylvania 3: Summer Vacation
2018 (46th)	Greg Gladstone, Tolga Göktekin, Jason Johnston, Eric Lacroix, Krzysztof Rost	Incredibles 2
2018 (46th)	So Ishigaki, Graham Wiebe	Next Gen
2019 (47th)
2019 (47th)	Benjamin Fiske, Alex Moaveni, Jesse Erickson, Dimitre Berberov, Kee Nam Suong	Frozen 2
2019 (47th)	Amaury Aubel, James Jackson, Domin Lee, Michael Losure, Alex Timchenko	Abominable
2019 (47th)	Eric Wachtman, David Horsley, Peter Stuart, Timur Khodzhaev, Joe Strasser	Missing Link
2019 (47th)	Alexis Angelidis, Amit Ganapati Baadkar, Greg Gladstone, Kylie Wijsmuller, Matthew Kiyoshi Wong	Toy Story 4
2019 (47th)	Hidetsugu Ito, Yuko Nakajima, Jumi Lee, Ryosuke Tsuda	Weathering with You

Outstanding Achievement for Animated Effects in a Live Action Production

Year	Recipient(s)	Film
2011 (39th)
2011 (39th)	Florent Andorra	Transformers: Dark of the Moon
2011 (39th)	Branko Grujcic	Pirates of the Caribbean: On Stranger Tides
2011 (39th)	Gary Wu	Cowboys & Aliens
2011 (39th)	Lee Uren	Cowboys & Aliens
2012 (40th)
2012 (40th)	Jerome Platteaux, John Sigurdson, Ryan Hopkins, Raul Essig, Mark Chataway	The Avengers
2012 (40th)	Stephen Marshall, Joseph Pepper, Dustin Wicke	The Amazing Spider-Man
2012 (40th)	Sue Rowe, Simon Stanley-Clamp, Artemis Oikonomopoulou, Holger Voss, Nikki Makar, Catherine Elvidge	John Carter
2012 (40th)	Willi Geiger, Rick Hankins, Florent Andorra, Florian Witzel, Aron Bonar	Battleship
2013 (41st)
2013 (41st)	Michael Balog, Ryan Hopkins, Patrick Conran, Florian Witzel	Pacific Rim
2013 (41st)	Jonathan Paquin, Brian Goodwin, Gray Horsfield, Mathieu Chardonnet, Adrien Toupet	Man of Steel
2013 (41st)	Ben O'Brien, Karin Cooper, Lee Uren, Chris Root	Star Trek Into Darkness
2013 (41st)	Dan Pearson, Jay Cooper, Jeff Grebe, Amelia Chenoweth	Star Trek Into Darkness
2014 (42nd)
2014 (42nd)	Steve Avoujageli, Atsushi Ikarashi, Pawel Grochola, Paul Waggoner, Viktor Lundqvist	Edge of Tomorrow
2014 (42nd)	Raul Essig, Karin Cooper, Rick Hankins, Owen Calouro	Noah
2014 (42nd)	Charles-Felix Chabert, Daniel La Chapelle, Spencer Lueders, Klaus Seitschek, Chris Messineo	The Amazing Spider-Man 2
2014 (42nd)	Areito Echevarria, Andreas Soderstrom, Ronnie Menahem, Christoph Sprenger, Kevin Romond	The Hobbit: The Desolation of Smaug
2014 (42nd)	Michael Balog, Jim Van Allen, Rick Hankins, John Hansen	Transformers: Age of Extinction
2014 (42nd)	Jeremy Hampton, Daniel Stern, Edmond Smith III, Hiroshi Tsubokawa, Daniel Jenkins	X-Men: Days of Future Past
2015 (43rd)
2015 (43rd)	Michael Balog, Jim Van Allen, Florent Andorra, Georg Kaltenbrunner	Avengers: Age of Ultron
2015 (43rd)	Raul Essig, Roman Schmidt, Mark Chataway, Ryan Hopkins	Jurassic World
2015 (43rd)	Ronnie Menahem, Pavani Rao Boddapati, Francois Sugny, Leslie Chan, Nicolas Petit	Maze Runner: The Scorch Trials
2015 (43rd)	Ronnie Menahem, Brian Goodwin, Jason Lazaroff, Paul Harris, James Ogle	The Hobbit: The Battle of the Five Armies
2016 (44th)
2016 (44th)	Georg Kaltenbrunner, Michael Marcuzzi, Thomas Bevan, Andrew Graham, Jihyun Yoon (for "Mirror Dimension")	Doctor Strange
2016 (44th)	Raul Essig, Mark Chataway, George Kuruvilla, Mihai Cioroba (for "The Rig")	Deepwater Horizon
2016 (44th)	Chris Young, Van Aarde Krynauw, Aleksa Dodic, Gabriel Reichle	Ghostbusters
2016 (44th)	Claude Schitter, Benjaman Folkman, Gary Boyle, David Caeiro, Luke Millar	The BFG
2016 (44th)	John Hansen, George Kuruvilla, Alexis Hall, Gordon Chapman, Ben O'Brien (for "Magic")	Warcraft

=== 2020s ===
Best FX - Feature

Year	Recipient(s)	Film
2020 (48th)
2020 (48th)	Tolga Göktekin, Carl Kaphan, Hiroaki Narita, Enrique Vila, Kylie Wijsmuller	Soul
2020 (48th)	Ian Farnsworth, Brian Casper, Reinhold Rittinger, Zoran Stojanoski, Jennifer Lasrado	Over the Moon
2020 (48th)	Amaury Aubel, Domin Lee, Alex Timchenko, Andrew Wheeler, Derek Cheung	The Croods: A New Age
2020 (48th)	Zachary Glynn, Landon Gray, Youxi Woo, John Kosnik, Doug Rizeakos	Trolls World Tour
2020 (48th)	Andreu Campos, Narissa Schander, Eimhin McNamara	Wolfwalkers
2021 (49th)
2021 (49th)	Christopher Logan, Man-Louk Chin, Devdatta Nerurkar, Pav Grochola, Filippo Maccari	The Mitchells vs. the Machines
2021 (49th)	Ryo Horibe, Yohei Shimozawa	Belle
2021 (49th)	Alex Moaveni, Dimitre Berberov, Bruce Wright, Scott Townsend, Dale Mayeda	Encanto
2021 (49th)	Peter De Mund, Cong Wang, Robert Bennett, Joel Einhorn, Debbie Carlson	Raya and the Last Dragon
2021 (49th)	Martin Furness, Lucy Maxian, Nachiket Pujari, Theodor Vandernoot, Stephanie Molk	Vivo
2022 (50th)
2022 (50th)	Johnathan M. Nixon, David Moraton, Nicholas Illingworth, David Caeiro Cebrian, Alex Nowotny	Avatar: The Way of Water
2022 (50th)	Carl Kaphan, Cody Harrington, Hope Schroers, Jon Barry, Nate Skeen	Lightyear
2022 (50th)	Aaron Weintraub, Warren Lawtey, Alireza Malmiri, Baptiste Malbranque, Mikhail Donchenko	Guillermo del Toro's Pinocchio
2022 (50th)	Frank Baradat, Simon Pate, Milan Voukassovitch, Milo Riccarand	Minions: The Rise of Gru
2022 (50th)	Spencer Lueders, Dmitriy Kolesnik, Kiel Gnebba, Oleksandr (Alex) Loboda, Jeremy Hoey	The Sea Beast
2023 (51st)
2023 (51st)	Pav Grochola, Filippo Maccari, Naoki Kato, Nicola Finizio, and Edmond Boulet-Gilly	Spider-Man: Across the Spider-Verse
2023 (51st)	Charles Copping, Jon Biggins, Jim Lewis, Rich Spence, and Martin Lipmann	Chicken Run: Dawn of the Nugget
2023 (51st)	Chris Chapman, Tim Speltz, Krzysztof Rost, Amit Baadkar, Ravindra Dwivedi	Elemental
2023 (51st)	Lukasz Mackiewicz and Kamil Polak	The Peasants
2023 (51st)	Yoshitaka Takeuchi and Hiroyuki Seshita	Suzume
2024 (52nd)
2024 (52nd)	Derek Cheung, Michael Losure, David Chow, Nyoung Kim, Steve Avoujageli	The Wild Robot
2024 (52nd)	Zachary Glynn, Alex Timchenko, Kiem Ching Ong, Yorie Kaela Kumalasari, Jinguang Huang	Kung Fu Panda 4
2024 (52nd)	Santiago Robles, Marc Bryant, Deborah Carlson, Jake Rice, Ian J. Coony	Moana 2
2024 (52nd)	Goncalo Cabaca, Vishal Patel, Zheng Yong Oh, Nicholas Yoon Joo Kuang, Pei-Zhi Huang Huang	Ultraman: Rising
2024 (52nd)	Howard Jones, Rich Spence, Deborah Jane Price, Jon Biggins, Kirstie Deane	Wallace & Gromit: Vengeance Most Fowl
2025 (53rd)
2025 (53rd)	Filippo Macari, Nicola Finizio, Simon Lewis, Naoki Kato, and Daniel La Chapelle	KPop Demon Hunters
2025 (53rd)	Ferdi Scheepers, Shaun Galinak, Alyssa Lee, Nate Skeen, and Gary Bruins	Elio
2025 (53rd)	Dmitriy Kolesnik, Stephen Paschk, David Sellares, and Stephanie McNair	In Your Dreams
2025 (53rd)	Landon Gray, Michael Losure, Zachary Glynn, Chris Wombold, and Olivier Malric	The Bad Guys 2
2025 (53rd)	Le Joyce Tong, Shamintha Kalamba Arachchi, Dimitre Berberov, Chris Carignan, and Cristiana Covone	Zootopia 2
