= Steven MacLeod =

American storyboard artist

Steven A. MacLeod is an American storyboard artist at DreamWorks Animation. He served as the head of story for Glen Keane's 2020 Netflix film Over the Moon and the 2026 DreamWorks film Forgotten Island.

== Education ==
MacLeod studied at the California Institute of the Arts. After his first year, he took a three-year break from CalArts in the early 2000s to become a missionary in Brazil, and eventually graduated from CalArts in 2007.

== Career ==
After graduation, MacLeod was immediately accepted by DreamWorks Animation in 2007 for its story training program as ran by animator Jeff Snow. After spending three months in the program, MacLeod began work as a storyboard artist for Chris Sanders' then-upcoming film The Croods as his first project, wherein he was placed in charge of character creation. MacLeod also served as a story artist for How to Train Your Dragon (2010) for 11 months when Sanders became its director, and afterwards returned to storyboarding for The Croods until as late as October 2012. After The Croods premiered in February 2013, MacLeod began storyboarding for Me and My Shadow, a project conceptualized by filmmaker Edgar Wright, but the film did not come to fruition.

In the late 2010s, MacLeod served as the head of story for the Netflix animated film Over the Moon, directed by former Disney animator Glen Keane, and by 2024, became head of story for the DreamWorks project Forgotten Island (2026).

== Personal life ==
MacLeod's first child, a daughter, was born in 2007. MacLeod is partially of Filipino ethnicity from his mother Luisa.

== Filmography ==
=== Film ===
Year	Title	Role	Studio	Note(s)	Ref.
2005	My Little Obsessive Compulsive Friend	Director, animator	—N/a	short film	
2010	How to Train Your Dragon	Story artist	DreamWorks Animation		
2013	The Croods	Story artist	DreamWorks Animation		
2014	Rocky & Bullwinkle	Story artist	DreamWorks Animation	Short film	
2016	Trolls	Additional story artist	DreamWorks Animation		
2017	The Boss Baby	Story artist	DreamWorks Animation		
2019	The Lego Movie 2: The Second Part	Additional story artist	Warner Bros. Animation		
2020	Over the Moon	Head of story	Netflix Animation Studios; Pearl Studio; Glen Keane Productions		
2020	The Croods: A New Age	Additional story artist	DreamWorks Animation		
2021	Back to the Outback	Story artist	Netflix Animation Studios; Reel FX Animation; Weed Road Pictures		
2022	Puss in Boots: The Last Wish	Story artist	DreamWorks Animation		
2024	Thelma the Unicorn	Story artist	Netflix Animation Studios; Scholastic Entertainment		
2024	The Wild Robot	Story artist	DreamWorks Animation		
2025	A Minecraft Movie	Illustrator	Warner Bros. Pictures		
2026	Forgotten Island	Head of story	DreamWorks Animation		

=== Television ===
Year	Title	Role	Note(s)	Ref.
2014	Over the Garden Wall	Writer	Episode: "Songs of the Dark Lantern"	
2017	Trolls Holiday	Story artist	Television special	

== Accolades ==
Year	Award-giving body	Category	Work	Result	Ref.
2014	41st Annie Awards	Outstanding Achievement, Storyboarding in an Animated Feature Production	The Croods	Nominated	
