= The Croods: A New Age =

2020 animated film directed by Joel Crawford

- Theatrical release poster
- Directed by: Joel Crawford
- Screenplay by: Dan Hageman; Kevin Hageman; Paul Fisher; Bob Logan
- Story by: Kirk DeMicco; Chris Sanders
- Produced by: Mark Swift
- Starring: Nicolas Cage; Emma Stone; Ryan Reynolds; Catherine Keener; Clark Duke; Cloris Leachman; Leslie Mann; Peter Dinklage; Kelly Marie Tran
- Edited by: James Ryan
- Music by: Mark Mothersbaugh
- Production company: DreamWorks Animation
- Distributed by: Universal Pictures
- Release date: November 25, 2020
- Running time: 95 minutes
- Country: United States
- Language: English
- Budget: $65 million
- Box office: $215.9 million

The Croods: A New Age (also known as The Croods 2) is a 2020 American animated adventure comedy film produced by DreamWorks Animation. It is the sequel to The Croods (2013), and was directed by Joel Crawford, and written by Paul Fisher, Bob Logan, and Dan and Kevin Hageman. Nicolas Cage, Emma Stone, Ryan Reynolds, Catherine Keener, Clark Duke, and Cloris Leachman reprise their roles from the original film, with Leslie Mann, Peter Dinklage, and Kelly Marie Tran joining the cast. The film follows the Croods, Guy, and their pets Belt, Chunky, and Douglas as they discover an idyllic, walled-in paradise that meets all of their needs. However, they must also learn to live with the Bettermans, a family a couple of steps above the Croods on the evolutionary ladder.

The sequel was first announced in April 2013, with directors Chris Sanders and Kirk DeMicco returning to helm the film. Its development continued through 2014 and 2015 until its cancellation in November 2016 due to doubts in response to NBCUniversal's August 2016 acquisition of DreamWorks Animation. However, the project was revived in September 2017, with Crawford replacing Sanders and DeMicco as directors in the following month, though they retain story credit. Due to the COVID-19 pandemic in the United States, most of the animating process was done from the crew's homes.

The Croods: A New Age was theatrically released in the United States on November 25, 2020, by Universal Pictures. It grossed $215 million against its $65 million budget and received generally positive reviews from critics. The film was nominated for the Golden Globe Award for Best Animated Feature Film.

== Plot ==
The Croods, Guy, and their pets Belt, Chunky, and Douglas roam their new homeland, fighting off dangerous creatures as they look for a place to permanently settle. Grug, the family patriarch, is increasingly concerned about the budding romance between Guy and his daughter, Eep, fearing they might leave the rest of the family behind.

The Croods' journey takes an unexpected turn when Grug discovers a massive wall and leads the family over it into a paradise-like land on the other side. They are quickly captured by the land's owners, Phil and Hope Betterman, modern humans who were friends with Guy's late parents and are now technologically advanced. They release the Croods, but behave condescendingly towards them. Believing that Guy would be better off with them, Phil and Hope devise a plan to get him to leave Eep and the Croods.

Grug's time with the Bettermans becomes uncomfortable. As Phil takes him into his man cave, a sauna, he is manipulated by Phil who believes that Guy should stay with them while Eep stays with her family. Hope also tries to manipulate Ugga, Grug's wife, but fails, and Grug and Ugga consider leaving. Eep discovers that Phil and Hope's daughter, Dawn, has never been outside the walls. Eep persuades Dawn to escape with her for a joyride using Chunky, but their adventure goes awry, leaving them both disheveled. Upon their return, Guy scolds Eep for her recklessness, leading to a falling out between them.

During dinner, tensions escalate, and Grug accidentally reveals some of his conversations with Phil. Fed up with the Bettermans' condescension towards their differences, the Croods decide to leave, while Guy opts to stay behind. However, their departure is disrupted by Punch Monkeys, who are angry for not having the bananas that Phil usually provides as a daily offering due to Grug and Ugga having eaten all of them. The Punch Monkeys capture Grug, Phil, and Guy, taking them to their lair, while the remaining Croods and Bettermans follow their scent.

At the lair, it is revealed that one of Phil's irrigation projects deprived the Monkeys of their water supply; the monkeys demanded the bananas as repayment because they needed extra food to offer to a monstrous Spiny Mandrilla to maintain their peace with it. Meanwhile, the remaining Croods and Bettermans lose the boys' scent and find themselves marooned in a frozen wasteland, where they encounter giant wolf spiders. Hope finally comes to terms with her prejudice against the Croods; she and the others accept each other as equals and decide to call themselves "The Thunder Sisters". They eventually locate Grug, Phil, and Guy just as the Punch Monkeys prepare to sacrifice them to the Spiny Mandrilla. Guy and Eep reconcile and use a giant skull chandelier to knock the Spiny Mandrilla into a chasm, where it plummets to its death while the two families escape.

With their differences resolved, the Bettermans invite the Croods to live as neighbors on their land. Guy and Eep choose to share one of the Bettermans' bedrooms, and the Punch Monkeys become their next-door neighbors.

== Voice cast ==
- Nicolas Cage as Grug Crood, a caveman and the patriarch of the Croods.
- Emma Stone as Eep Crood, a cavewoman, Grug's oldest daughter, and Guy's girlfriend.
- Ryan Reynolds as Guy, a caveman with an advanced modern mindset who lives with the Croods and is Eep's boyfriend.
  - Gabriel Jack voices a younger Guy.
- Catherine Keener as Ugga Crood, a cavewoman and Grug's wife.
- Cloris Leachman as Gran, an old cavewoman who is Ugga's mother and Eep, Thunk, and Sandy's grandmother.
- Clark Duke as Thunk Crood, a cave boy and Grug's son.
- Peter Dinklage as Phil Betterman, the patriarch of the Bettermans who had a history with Guy's parents.
- Leslie Mann as Hope Betterman, the matriarch of the Bettermans and Phil's wife.
- Kelly Marie Tran as Dawn Betterman, Phil and Hope's daughter and only child who befriends Eep and is Guy's old friend.
- Kailey Crawford as Sandy Crood, a cavegirl and Grug's 5-year-old daughter. Her vocal effects were previously performed by Randy Thom in the last movie.
- Chris Sanders as Belt, Guy's pet sloth.
- James Ryan as Sash, Dawn's pet sloth.
- Melissa Disney as Guy's mom, the unnamed mother of Guy who died in the rising tar pit.
- Joel Crawford as Guy's dad, the unnamed father of Guy who died in the rising tar pit.
- Januel Mercado as Shaman Monkey, the head of the Punch Monkeys.
- Ryan Naylor as Creepo Monkey, a creepy-eyed member of the Punch Monkeys.
- Artemis Pebdani as additional voices

ADR group was provided by Richard Gould, Ryan Naylor, Randy Thom, editor James Ryan, head-of-story Januel Mercado and director Joel Crawford.

== Production ==
=== Development ===
In April 2013, DreamWorks announced a sequel to the film The Croods, with Chris Sanders and Kirk DeMicco set to return as directors and writers. According to DeMicco, the sequel would focus on Ugga and motherhood, making it "the first chapter of society," expanding on the first film, which he said is about "the last chapter of the caveman."

On June 12, 2014, it was announced that the sequel would be released on November 3, 2017. On August 21, 2014, the film was pushed back to December 22, 2017. On August 9, 2016, nearing Comcast's impending acquisition of DreamWorks Animation, 20th Century Fox removed the film from the release schedule, with Blue Sky's Ferdinand taking over its release date. The film would instead be released by Universal Pictures, which would take over distribution once DreamWorks Animation's distribution deal with Fox expires in 2017, sometime in 2018. On August 23, 2016, it was reported that Kevin and Dan Hageman had been hired to rewrite the script.

On November 11, 2016, DreamWorks announced that production for the sequel was cancelled. According to reports, there had been doubts about proceeding with the project before NBCUniversal's acquisition of the studio, and DreamWorks decided to cancel the film. However, in September 2017, DreamWorks and Universal revealed that the film was back in production, with a release date scheduled for September 18, 2020. It was also revealed that both DeMicco and Sanders would not be returning. In October 2017, it was reported that Joel Crawford would replace them as director and Mark Swift would replace both the first film's producers, Jane Hartwell and Kristine Belson, as the producer of the film. Januel Mercado, who previously served as supervising director of the television series Harvey Beaks, was brought on as the film's head of story. Mercado stated that much of the film's comedic elements took inspiration from the ensemble comedy of Arrested Development. Production of the film was shifted to work remotely during the COVID-19 pandemic.

=== Casting ===
In September 2013, it was confirmed that Nicolas Cage, Emma Stone, and Ryan Reynolds would reprise their roles in the sequel as Grug, Eep, and Guy, respectively, from the first film. On May 21, 2015, Leslie Mann and Kat Dennings joined the voice cast. Mann would lend her voice to an upscale mother of a rival family named Hope Betterman, while Dennings was set to voice her daughter, Dawn. It was also reported that Catherine Keener and Clark Duke were reprising their roles as Ugga and Thunk. In September 2017, it was confirmed that the original actors would reprise their roles. In October 2018, Peter Dinklage was cast in the film to voice the character Phil Betterman. In October 2019, DreamWorks revealed that Kelly Marie Tran had replaced Dennings as Dawn.

=== Animation and design ===
While the first film had some rough details similar to How to Train Your Dragon, the designs of the second film were more simplified and rendered by MoonRay. 2D animation for the Travel Logs and the Cave Diary was provided by Bird Karma director William Salazar rather than animation from James Baxter on the first film.

=== Music ===
In September 2020, it was announced that Mark Mothersbaugh had replaced the first film's composer, Alan Silvestri, as composer for this film. On November 12, 2020, a single called "Feel the Thunder," performed by HAIM was released.

== Release ==
=== Theatrical ===
The Croods: A New Age was theatrically released in the United States on November 25, 2020, by Universal Pictures, which was then followed by a PVOD release on December 18. It was previously scheduled to be released on November 3, 2017, December 22, 2017, September 18, 2020, and December 23, 2020. The studio spent about $26.5 million promoting the film. In the United Kingdom, the film was released on July 16, 2021.

=== Home media ===
The Croods: A New Age was released by Universal Pictures Home Entertainment on Digital HD and on DVD, Blu-ray, Blu-ray 3D, and 4K Ultra HD on February 23, 2021. All the releases include two new short films, Family Movie Night: Little Red Bronana Bread and Dear Diary: World's First Pranks, the award-winning short To: Gerard, deleted scenes, an audio commentary, and more.

== Reception ==
=== Box office and VOD ===
The Croods: A New Age has grossed $58.6 million in the United States and Canada and $157.4 million in other territories, for a worldwide total of $216 million. It became the first animated film released during the COVID-19 pandemic and the first family film since Sonic the Hedgehog to break the $200 million mark.

In the United States, the film made $1.85 million from 2,211 theaters on its first day, $2.7 million on its second (a 47% increase, as opposed to the normal 40% drop seen on Thanksgiving Day), and $4 million on its third. It went on to debut at $9.7 million in its opening weekend (a five-day total of $14.3 million), the biggest opening weekend since Tenet over two months prior. The film remained in theaters the following two weekends, grossing $4.4 million and $3 million, respectively. It was dethroned by Monster Hunter in its fourth weekend. That same weekend, the film was the most-rented on FandangoNow, Apple TV, and Google Play. In its fifth weekend, the film grossed $1.7 million over the Christmas frame. It also remained number one on all digital rental platforms. IndieWire estimated the film had made about $20 million from PVOD sales up to that point (of which Universal would keep 80%). The film continued to hold steady on subsequent weekends and regained the top box office spot in its 12th week of release with $2.7 million.

The film earned $3 million on its opening day in China, which is the third biggest for a Hollywood film in 2020, behind Tenet and Mulan. It went on to earn $19.2 million in China and a total of $21.6 million internationally. By its third weekend of release, the film had crossed $46 million (RMB 300 million) in China, becoming the second-biggest Hollywood title of the year in the country behind Tenet ($66.6 million). It made $3.2 million in its fourth weekend of international play, pushing its running total above $57 million.

=== Critical response ===
Critics noted The Croods: A New Age as "a decent-enough follow-up" and commended the cast. On review aggregator Rotten Tomatoes, 76% of 157 critics' reviews of the film are positive, with an average rating of 6.4/10. The website's critic consensus reads: "Another agreeable outing for the titular prehistoric clan, The Croods: A New Age may be the missing link for parents between more elevated family-friendly fare." According to Metacritic, which calculated a weighted average score of 56 out of 100 based on 30 critics, the film received "mixed or average reviews."

Ben Kenigsberg of The New York Times gave a mixed-to-positive review, writing, "No one would call it a huge leap on the evolutionary ladder, but the animated sequel The Croods: A New Age is slightly funnier than its serviceable 2013 predecessor." Michael O'Sullivan of The Washington Post rated the film 2/4 stars, describing it as a "larky, slightly lunatic film." Lindsey Bahr at Associated Press rated the film 2.5/4, stating, "it might not be as novel as the first, but it's essentially harmless, if a little chaotic, fun for kids and doesn't need to be anything more than that." Kate Erbland of IndieWire gave the film a "C+" and said, "It's a little silly, very colorful, and entertaining enough to deliver some good-hearted ideas that aren't beholden to any period in time. Worth nearly a decade of push-pull to get here? Probably not, but on its own merits it's a charming throwback." Cath Clarke of The Guardian rated the film 3/5 stars, writing, "A-list voice actors leaven this hectic children’s movie with gags for grownups." Alonso Duralde of TheWrap gave the film a positive review and wrote, "You may never have thought you needed or even wanted a sequel to The Croods, but you may find it a pleasant surprise in a year where most of the surprises have been anything but."

Audiences polled by CinemaScore gave the film an average grade of "A" on an A+ to F scale (the same score as the first film), and PostTrak reported 83% of those gave the film a positive score, with 59% saying they would definitely recommend it.

=== Accolades ===
Accolades received by The Croods: A New Age
Award	Date of ceremony	Category	Recipient(s)	Result	Ref.
Alliance of Women Film Journalists Awards	January 4, 2021	Time Waster Remake or Sequel Award	The Croods: A New Age	Nominated	
American Cinema Editors Awards	April 17, 2021	Best Edited Animated Feature Film	James Ryan	Nominated	
Annie Awards	April 16, 2021	Best Animated Feature	The Croods: A New Age	Nominated	
Annie Awards	April 16, 2021	Outstanding Achievement for Animated Effects in an Animated Production	Amaury Aubel, Domin Lee, Alex Timchenko, Andrew Wheeler, and Derek Cheung	Nominated	
Annie Awards	April 16, 2021	Outstanding Achievement for Character Animation in a Feature Production	Rani Naamani	Nominated	
Annie Awards	April 16, 2021	Outstanding Achievement for Character Design in a Feature Production	Joe Pitt	Nominated	
Annie Awards	April 16, 2021	Outstanding Achievement for Storyboarding in a Feature Production	Evon Freeman	Nominated	
Annie Awards	April 16, 2021	Outstanding Achievement for Voice Acting in a Feature Production	Nicolas Cage	Nominated	
Art Directors Guild Awards	April 10, 2021	Excellence in Production Design for an Animated Film	Nate Wragg	Nominated	
Artios Awards	April 15, 2021	Animation	Christi Soper Hilt	Nominated	
Cinema Audio Society Awards	April 17, 2021	Outstanding Achievement in Sound Mixing for a Motion Picture – Animated	Tighe Sheldon, Christopher Scarabosio, Leff Lefferts, Alan Meyerson, Richard Duarte, and Scott Curtis	Nominated	
Detroit Film Critics Society Awards	March 12, 2021	Best Animated Feature	The Croods: A New Age	Nominated	
Georgia Film Critics Association Awards	March 12, 2021	Best Animated Film	The Croods: A New Age	Nominated	
Golden Globe Awards	February 28, 2021	Best Animated Feature Film	The Croods: A New Age	Nominated	
Golden Reel Awards	April 16, 2021	Outstanding Achievement in Sound Editing – Feature Animation	Brian Chumney, Leff Lefferts, Randy Thom, Rick Hromadka, Dominick Certo, Pascal Garneau, Mac Smith, Doug Winningham, Dee Selby, Jonathan Greber, Ronni Brown, Shelley Roden, John Roesch, and Janna Vance	Nominated	
Golden Trailer Awards	July 22, 2021	Most Original TV Spot (for a Feature Film)	"Fashion Statement" (Framework)	Nominated	
Golden Trailer Awards	October 6, 2022	Best Comedy/Drama TrailerByte for a Feature Film	"Wildest Wildlife Documentary" (The Picture Production Company)	Nominated	
Hollywood Critics Association Awards	March 5, 2021	Best Animated Film	The Croods: A New Age	Nominated	
Hollywood Music in Media Awards	January 27, 2021	Best Original Score in an Animated Film	Mark Mothersbaugh	Nominated	
Hollywood Music in Media Awards	January 27, 2021	Best Original Song in an Animated Film	Alana Haim, Danielle Haim, Este Haim, and Ariel Rechtshaid for "Feel the Thunder"	Nominated	
Houston Film Critics Society Awards	January 18, 2021	Best Animated Film	The Croods: A New Age	Nominated	
Nickelodeon Kids' Choice Awards	March 13, 2021	Favorite Animated Movie	The Croods: A New Age	Nominated	
Nickelodeon Kids' Choice Awards	March 13, 2021	Favorite Voice from an Animated Movie	Ryan Reynolds	Nominated	
Nickelodeon Kids' Choice Awards	March 13, 2021	Favorite Voice from an Animated Movie	Emma Stone	Nominated	
Producers Guild of America Awards	March 24, 2021	Best Animated Motion Picture	Mark Swift	Nominated	
Visual Effects Society Awards	April 6, 2021	Outstanding Visual Effects in an Animated Feature	Joel Crawford, Mark Swift, Betsyf Nofsinger, and Jakob Hjort Jensen	Nominated	
Washington D.C. Area Film Critics Association Awards	February 8, 2021	Best Animated Feature	The Croods: A New Age	Nominated	

== Television series ==
A sequel animated series, titled The Croods: Family Tree, was announced and set to be released simultaneously on Peacock and Hulu on September 23, 2021. Tran reprises her role as Dawn, while A.J. LoCascio reprises his role as Thunk from Dawn of the Croods. The new voice cast features Amy Landecker as Ugga, Kiff VandenHeuvel as Grug, Ally Dixon as Eep, Artemis Pebdani as Gran, Darin Brooks as Guy, Matthew Waterson as Phil, Amy Rosoff as Hope, and Dee Bradley Baker as Sandy.
