= The Croods =

2013 film by Kirk DeMicco and Chris Sanders

- Theatrical release poster
- Directed by: Chris Sanders; Kirk DeMicco
- Screenplay by: Kirk DeMicco; Chris Sanders
- Story by: John Cleese; Kirk DeMicco; Chris Sanders
- Produced by: Kristine Belson; Jane Hartwell
- Starring: Nicolas Cage; Emma Stone; Ryan Reynolds; Catherine Keener; Cloris Leachman; Clark Duke
- Edited by: Erika Dapkewicz (Note: Credited as Eric Dapkewicz; Dapkewicz came out as transgender and changed her name in the 2010s.); Darren T. Holmes
- Music by: Alan Silvestri
- Production company: DreamWorks Animation
- Distributed by: 20th Century Fox (Note: In 2018, the film's distribution rights were transferred from 20th Century Fox to Universal Pictures, following NBCUniversal's acquisition of DreamWorks Animation in 2016.)
- Release dates: February 15, 2013 (Berlin); March 22, 2013 (United States)
- Running time: 98 minutes
- Country: United States
- Language: English
- Budget: $135–175 million
- Box office: $587.3 million

The Croods is a 2013 American animated adventure comedy film produced by DreamWorks Animation. Written and directed by Chris Sanders and Kirk DeMicco both of whom co-wrote the story with John Cleese, it stars the voice talents of Nicolas Cage, Emma Stone, Ryan Reynolds, Catherine Keener, Clark Duke, and Cloris Leachman. It is set in a fictional prehistoric Pliocene era known as "The Croodaceous" where Grug (Cage), patriarch of the Croods, is threatened by the arrival of a genius named Guy (Reynolds), who comes up with revolutionary new inventions as they trek through a dangerous land in search of a new home.

The Croods first premiered at the 63rd Berlin International Film Festival on February 15, 2013, and it was first released theatrically in the United States by 20th Century Fox on March 22, 2013. It received mixed reviews from critics and it grossed a total box office of $587.3 million against a total budget of $135–175 million. The Croods was nominated for an Academy Award and a Golden Globe for Best Animated Feature.

The Croods launched a franchise consisting of two television series Dawn of the Croods (2015) and The Croods: Family Tree (2021) and a sequel The Croods: A New Age (2020).

== Plot ==
The Croods, a cave family, have survived various natural disasters, due to the overprotective father Grug refusing to let anyone leave the cave except for short periods to gather food. Eep, his teenage daughter, loves her family but frequently rebels against Grug's strictures. One night, Eep sneaks out after seeing a light, and encounters a modern human boy named Guy and his pet sloth Belt, who have made a torch. He warns her of an impending apocalypse and offers to help her escape, but Eep elects to stay with the family. Guy leaves her a shell horn to blow if she needs help, but when Eep returns to her family, Grug and the others destroy the horn out of fear of the "New".

An earthquake destroys the cave and surrounding lands, and the Croods flee into a jungle they discover below their home mountains. Encountering a "Macawnivore" (portmanteau of "macaw" and "carnivore"), a Saber-toothed Cat whom Eep's grandmother dubs "Chunky", the family flees him, until he is scared off by "piranhakeets" (portmanteau of "piranha" and "parakeet") that devour a ground whale. Eep makes another horn and calls to Guy, who rescues them with his fire. After some confusion regarding the Croods' first contact with fire, Grug imprisons Guy in a log so he can guide them somewhere safe. To appease Grug, Guy suggests the Croods go to a mountain where there are caves, though in reality he and the other Croods doubt the wisdom of this.

During the journey, Guy is eventually trusted enough to be allowed out of the log. Grug attempts to steal a bird's egg for dinner, but catches a scorpion instead, and Guy teaches Eep how to lay a trap for the bird itself. Guy endears himself to most of the Croods by inventing rudimentary shoes, and other "ideas" which help them along the way. He also talks about "Tomorrow", a land of light where curiosity is not to be feared. Grug becomes jealous of Guy, especially after noticing he and Eep are falling in love. His disastrous attempts to fight against change, and to come up with inventions and ideas of his own, distance him from his family and cause his wife Ugga to argue with him.

The family finds a cave. However, no one but Grug wants to go in, having learned to adapt to living outside. Angered, Grug attacks Guy, and the two fall over a cliff into a tar flow. Believing they are doomed, Guy reveals that he lost his own family to a tar flow. Touched by this tragic backstory, Grug decides to work together with Guy to escape. They make a puppet to attract Chunky, who mistakes them for a female cat and pulls them free.

A volcanic cataclysm begins, and Guy and the Croods flee until they are halted at the edge of a chasm where the continents are drifting apart. Grug feels the sun's warmth through the smoke, and realizes that there may be good land on the other side. Grug tosses the others over the chasm one by one, knowing he will be left behind. He shares his latest invention, a "hug" with Eep before throwing her over with the rest of the family. They land, unharmed, on fertile land on the opposite cliff, while Grug shelters alone in a cave. Grug encounters Chunky, who reveals he is scared of the dark, and seeks comfort with Grug instead of attacking him. Hearing Eep blowing her horn to mourn him, Grug assumes they are calling for his help and comes up with a new idea. He uses tar, fire, a whale ribcage and the piranhakeets to create a makeshift airship in which he, Chunky, and other animals escape the final eruption and fly over the chasm to join the others.

Grug is welcomed lovingly back as the leader of the family, and Eep returns his hug. They all start a new life on a tropical mountainside that leads down to the seashore, where they can follow the sun every day and enjoy Guy and Grug's inventions.

== Voice cast ==
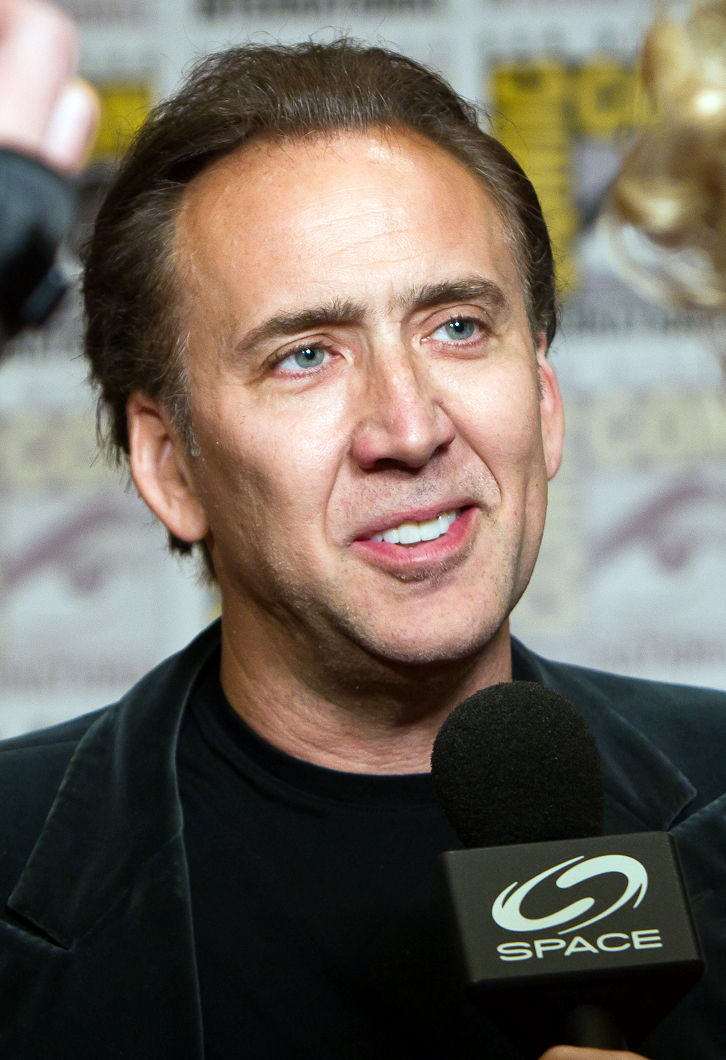
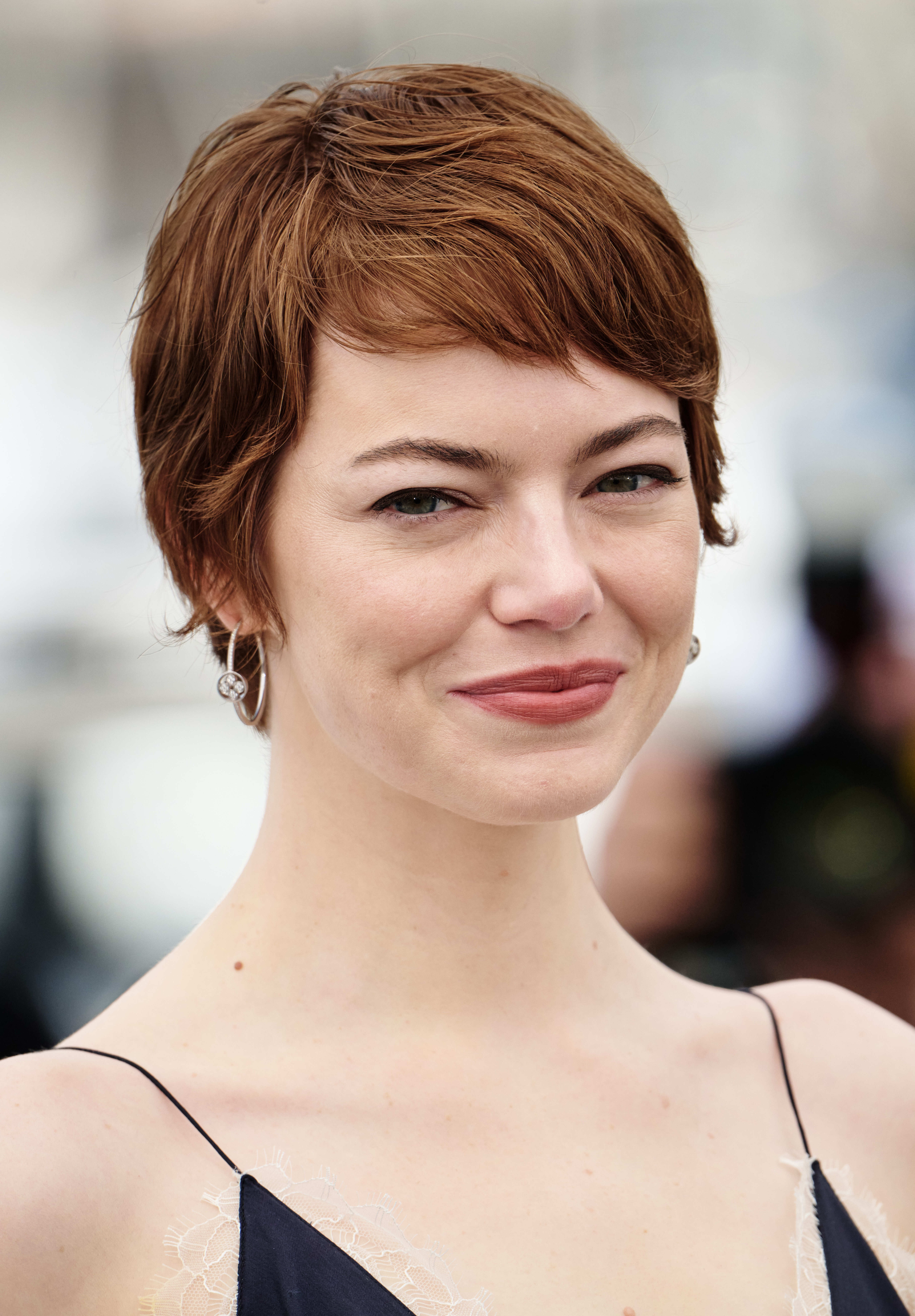
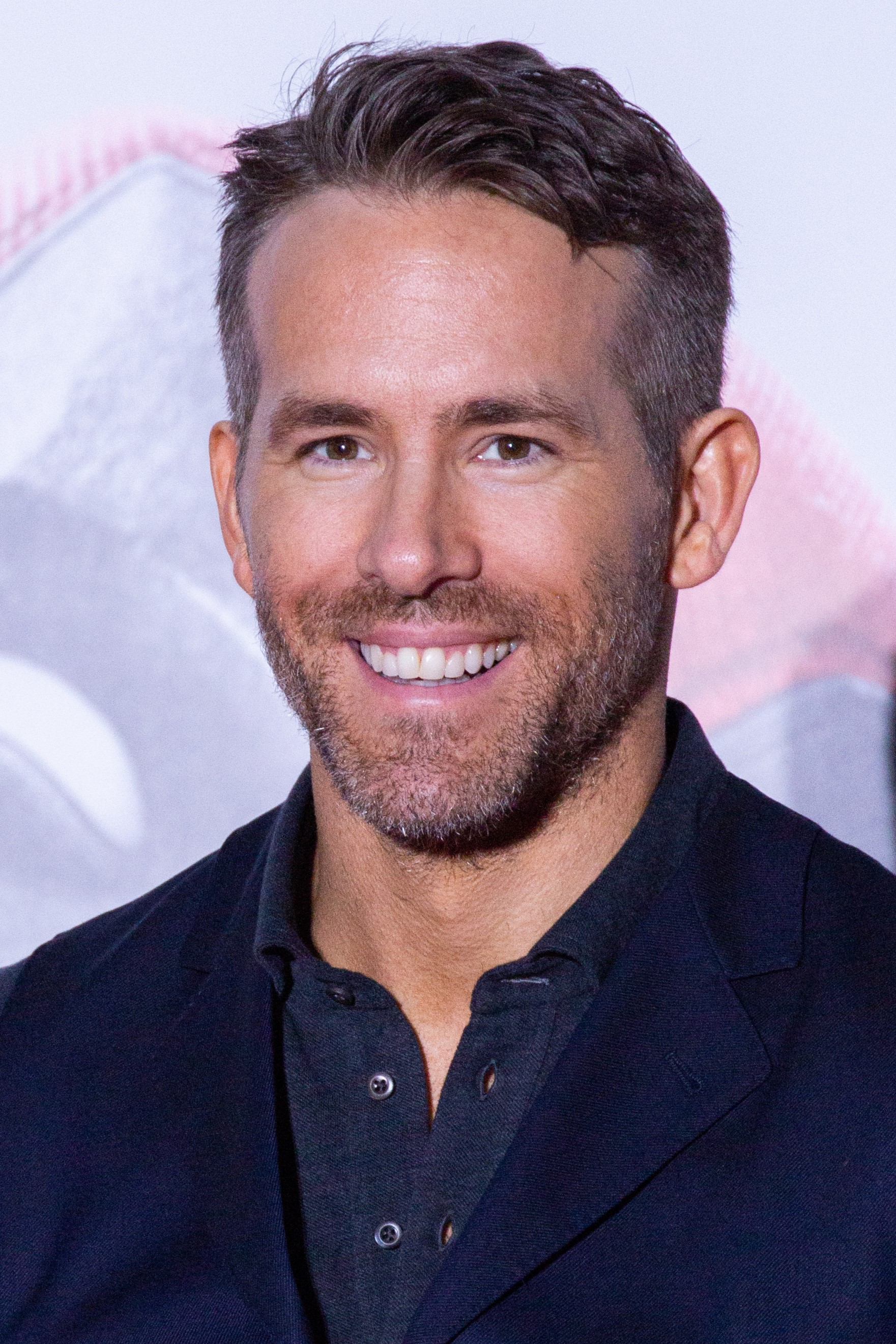
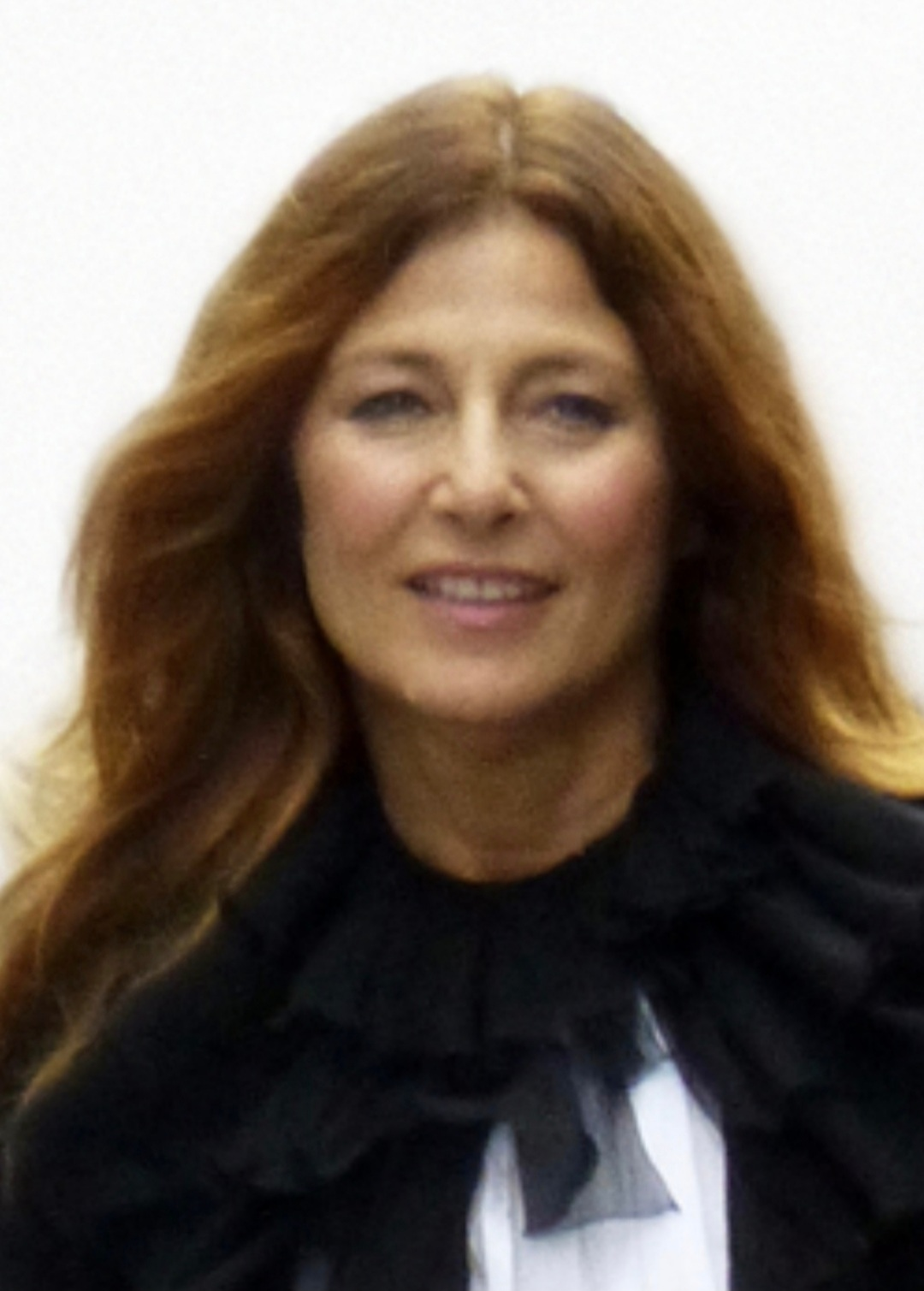
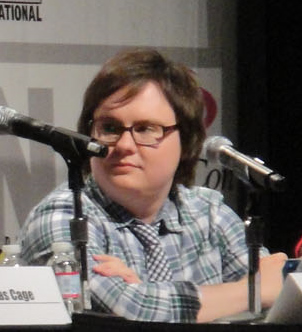
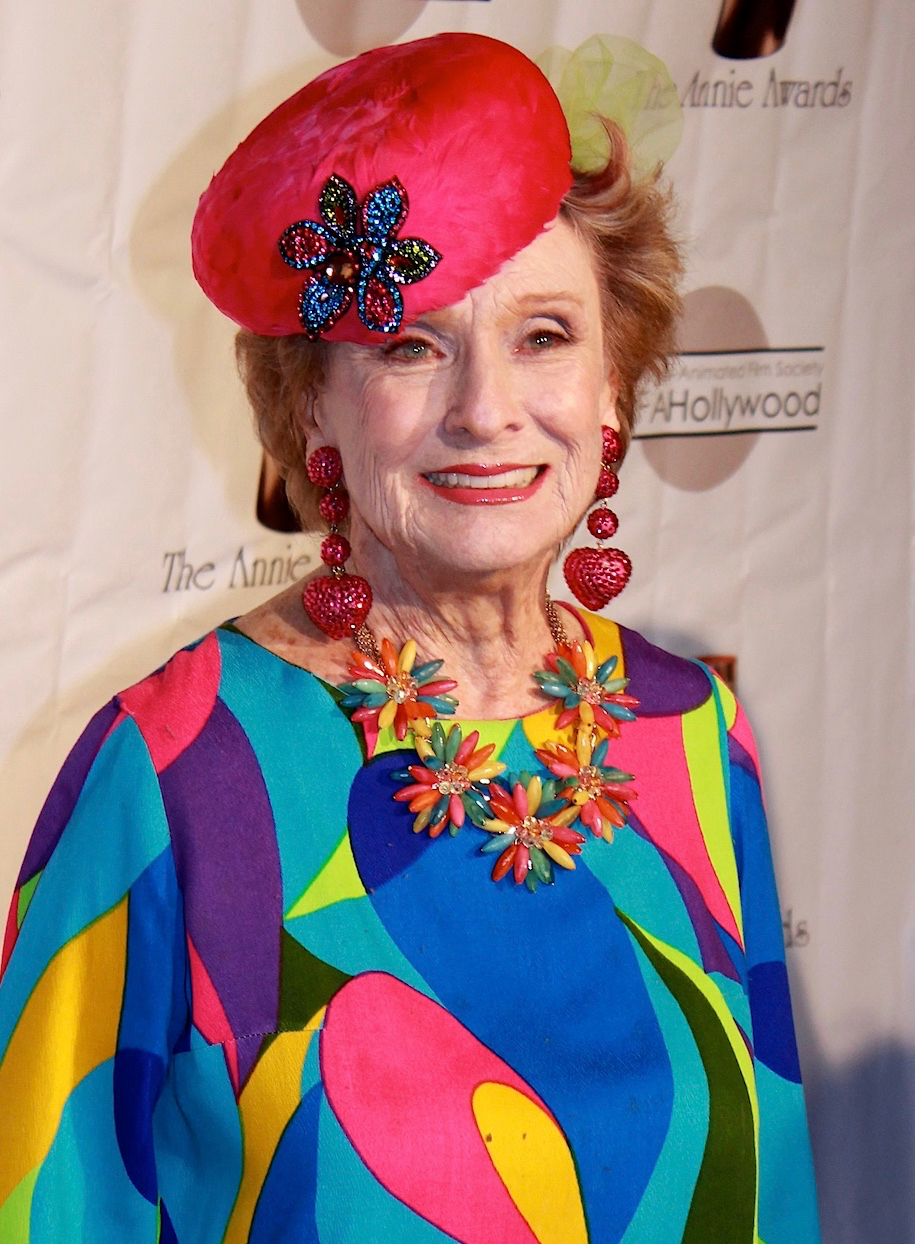
(Left-to-Right) Nicolas Cage (pictured in 2011), Emma Stone (2025), Ryan Reynolds (2018), Catherine Keener (2014), Clark Duke (2010) and Cloris Leachman (2014) lend their voices to Grug, Eep, Guy, Ugga, Thunk and Gran
- Emma Stone as Eep Crood, a teenage cavegirl who is Grug's and Ugga's first daughter, Thunk and Sandy's older sister, and Gran's oldest granddaughter. Eep is the eldest child and is much more willing to try anything new than the rest of her family. She holds romantic feelings towards Guy.
- Nicolas Cage as Grug Crood, an overprotective caveman who is Ugga's husband, Gran's son-in-law, and the father of Eep, Thunk, and Sandy.
- Ryan Reynolds as Guy, a more evolved teenage caveboy that, with the help of his pet sloth named Belt, thinks of new ideas and inventions that can help themselves or others. He holds romantic feelings towards Eep.
- Catherine Keener as Ugga Crood, a cavewoman who is Grug's wife, the daughter of Gran, and the mother of Eep, Thunk, and Sandy. She is more open-minded than Grug, but also finds it difficult to keep her family safe.
- Clark Duke as Thunk Crood, a caveboy who is Grug's and Ugga's son, Eep and Sandy's brother, and Gran's grandson. Thunk is the middle child and is not bright and has bad coordination, but has a good heart. He gets a "Crocopup" named Douglas for a pet.
- Cloris Leachman as Gran, an old and ferocious cavewoman who is the mother of Ugga, the mother-in-law of Grug, and the grandmother of Eep, Thunk, and Sandy.
- Randy Thom as Sandy Crood, Grug and Ugga's youngest daughter, Eep and Thunk's younger sister, and Gran's youngest granddaughter who still bites and growls instead of speaking. Thom created her voice with creature noises.
- Chris Sanders as Belt, Guy's pet sloth.

== Production ==
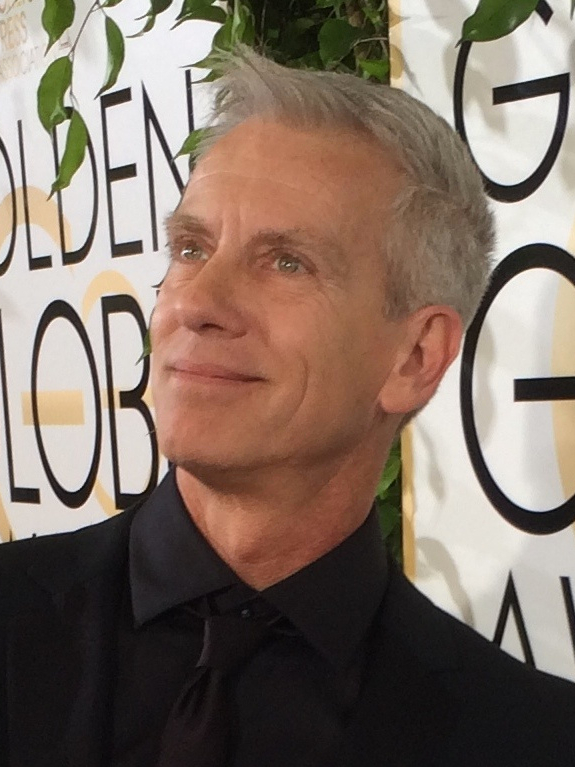
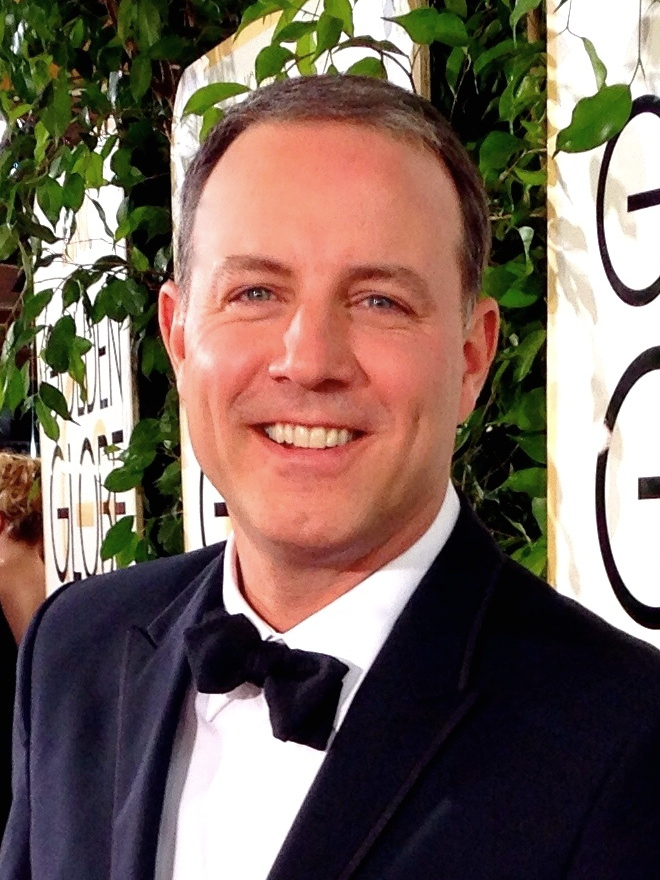
Director/Screenplay/Story Chris Sanders (left) and Kirk DeMicco (right).

The Croods was announced in May 2005 under the working title Crood Awakening. It was originally going to be a stop-motion film, being made by Aardman Animations, the creators of Wallace & Gromit: The Curse of the Were-Rabbit, as part of a "5-film deal" with DreamWorks Animation. John Cleese and Kirk DeMicco had been working together on a feature based on Roald Dahl's story The Twits, a project that never went into production.

DreamWorks Animation got a copy of their script and liked it, and invited Cleese and DeMicco over to take a look at the company's ideas to see if they found something they would like to work with. They chose a basic story idea about two cavemen on the run, an inventor and a luddite, and wrote the first few drafts of the script. In January 2007, with the departure of Aardman due to the box-office underperformance of Flushed Away, the rights for the film reverted to DreamWorks Animation. Aardman Animations, however, continued experimenting with the idea of a Stone Age-themed story which became Early Man, and was released in 2018.

In March 2007, Chris Sanders, writer and director of Disney's Lilo & Stitch, joined DreamWorks to direct the film, with intentions to significantly rewrite the script. In September 2008, it was reported that Sanders took over How to Train Your Dragon putting Crood Awakening on hold, and thus postponing its original schedule for a year to a then planned March 2012. The film's final title, The Croods, was revealed in May 2009, along with new co-director, DeMicco. In March 2011, the film got another delay, being pushed back a year to March 1, 2013, and finally to March 22.

== Release ==
=== Theatrical ===
The Croods had its world premiere in the out of competition section at the 63rd Berlin International Film Festival on February 15, 2013. It was released in the United States by 20th Century Fox on March 22, 2013. As part of their distribution deal, it was the first DreamWorks Animation film to be distributed by 20th Century Fox, following the expiration of their previous distribution deal with Paramount Pictures after Rise of the Guardians in 2012. The film was the first feature film to be shown in the 4DX format, featuring strobe lights, moving seats, blowing wind, fog and scent effects in Hungary, where it was shown at the Cinema City theater in Budapest, Hungary. It was also the first film in China to be distributed by Oriental DreamWorks, a film production and distribution company founded in 2012 by DreamWorks Animation and Chinese investment companies.

=== Home media ===
The Croods was released on Blu-ray (2D and 3D) and DVD by 20th Century Fox Home Entertainment (through DreamWorks Animation Home Entertainment) on October 1, 2013. The DVD and Blu-ray comes with a Belt plush toy. The DVD version also came with holiday specials Shrek the Halls, Merry Madagascar, Kung Fu Panda Holiday and Gift of the Night Fury. As of February 2015, 9 million home entertainment units were sold worldwide. The Croods was released on 4K Ultra HD Blu-ray by Universal Pictures Home Entertainment on November 17, 2020. It was also released in a 2-movie pack alongside its sequel The Croods: A New Age on DVD and Blu-ray by Universal Pictures Home Entertainment in 2021.

== Reception ==
=== Box office ===
The Croods grossed $187.2 million in the United States and Canada, and $400 million in other countries, for a worldwide total of $587.2 million. Deadline Hollywood calculated the net profit of the film to be $106.5 million, when factoring together all expenses and revenues. It is the eleventh highest grossing 2013 film, and the fourth highest grossing 2013 animated film (behind Frozen, Despicable Me 2, and Monsters University). It became the second highest grossing original DreamWorks Animation film, behind Kung Fu Panda. As of September 2023, it is the 188th-highest-grossing film, and the 40th-highest-grossing animated film.

In North America, the film earned $11.6 million on its opening day. On its opening weekend, the film topped the box office with $43.6 million from 4,046 locations, a vast improvement over the DreamWorks Animation's directly preceding release Rise of the Guardians, yet still below some of the studio's other original films, like Megamind and How to Train Your Dragon.

Outside North America, the film topped the box office during its first weekend with $62.4 million (including previews from the previous weekend). It opened at number one in 54 countries, with the biggest openings achieved in the United Kingdom, Ireland and Malta ($8.08 million), Russia and the CIS ($7.82 million), China ($6.34 million), and Mexico ($4.37 million).

In total grosses, the film's biggest market was China with $63.3 million, becoming the highest grossing original animated film, surpassing DreamWorks Animation's film Kung Fu Panda. In addition, the film earned $43.1 million in the United Kingdom, Ireland and Malta, $28.6 million in Russia and the CIS, $27.7 million in Mexico, and $23.8 million in Australia. Earning a total of $400 million, it is the highest grossing 2013 film distributed by 20th Century Fox.

=== Critical response ===
On review aggregator Rotten Tomatoes, the film holds an approval rating of 71% based on 142 reviews, with an average score of 6.6/10. The website's critical consensus reads: "While it may not be as (ahem) evolved as the best modern animated fare, The Croods will prove solidly entertaining for families seeking a fast-paced, funny cartoon adventure." On Metacritic, which assigns a normalized rating to reviews, the film has a weighted average score of 55 out of 100, based on 30 critics, indicating "mixed or average reviews". Audiences polled by CinemaScore gave the film an average grade of "A" on an A+ to F scale.

Lisa Kennedy of The Denver Post gave the film three and a half stars out of four, saying "It captures the wonder (and more gently, the anxiety) of discovery time and time again. And the filmmakers have a hoot playing with the Croods' encounters with, as well as their misunderstandings of, all things new." Paul Asay of Plugged In gave the film a positive review, stating "The Croods is, first and foremost, Grug's story. And it's one I think an awful lot of fathers might relate to...I should say that there's very little to fear from this movie. The Croods, for all its slapstick violence, is a fun, mostly clean and utterly charming diversion - something made for kids but meant for their parents. It's funny. It's touching. It reminds us that being a parent is tough in any epoch, but always worth the effort."

Claudia Puig of USA Today gave the film two and a half stars out of four, saying, "A visually dazzling animated adventure with a well chosen voice cast is hampered by lackluster humor and a meandering story." Tom Russo of The Boston Globe also gave the film two and a half stars out of four, saying, "Had the movie figured out a way to stay the less clichéd course, it might have helped the DreamWorks oeuvre take steps toward Pixar's emotional resonance." Tirdad Derakhshani of The Philadelphia Inquirer also gave the film two and a half stars out of four, saying, "The movie is well edited and lean, a fast-paced, action filled bit of froth that manages to be diverting and surprisingly fun."

David Rooney of The Hollywood Reporter called the film, "Further back on the evolutionary chain than the Flintstones, and also lagging in the comedy stakes, this sweet Stone Age clan nonetheless will captivate the youngsters." Leslie Felperin of Variety found that, "The main problem with the film is that the script simply isn't very funny, and its various subplots never quite mesh satisfyingly together."

Laremy Legel of Film.com gave the film a B, saying "How to Train Your Dragon and Lilo & Stitch are completely indicative of the experience you'll have with The Croods, which is to say a supremely positive one." Keith Staskiewicz of Entertainment Weekly gave the film a C+, and wrote in his review, "A handful of adrenalizing sequences of animated anarchy can't save this story from feeling overly primitive."

In August 2021, Australian Prime Minister Scott Morrison compared the plot of the film to the process of easing COVID-19 restrictions. His comments were mocked on social media, with Courtney Fry of Pedestrian.TV noting the film as an odd reference, describing it as a "film that nobody has even thought about for nearly a decade".

=== Accolades ===
Accolades received by The Croods
Award	Date of ceremony	Category	Recipient(s)	Result	Ref.
3D Creative Arts Awards	January 28, 2014	Best Feature Film – Animation	The Croods	Nominated	
Academy Awards	March 2, 2014	Best Animated Feature	Chris Sanders, Kirk DeMicco, and Kristine Belson	Nominated	
Alliance of Women Film Journalists Awards	December 16, 2013	Best Animated Feature	The Croods	Nominated	
Alliance of Women Film Journalists Awards	December 16, 2013	Best Animated Female	Eep (Emma Stone)	Nominated	
Annie Awards	February 1, 2014	Best Animated Feature	The Croods	Nominated	
Annie Awards	February 1, 2014	Outstanding Achievement for Animated Effects in an Animated Production	Jeff Budsberg, Andre Le Blanc, Louis Flores, and Jason Mayer	Won	
Annie Awards	February 1, 2014	Outstanding Achievement for Character Animation in a Feature Production	Jakob Jensen	Won	
Annie Awards	February 1, 2014	Outstanding Achievement for Character Design in a Feature Production	Carter Goodrich, Takao Noguchi, and Shane Prigmore	Won	
Annie Awards	February 1, 2014	Outstanding Achievement for Directing in a Feature Production	Kirk DeMicco and Chris Sanders	Nominated	
Annie Awards	February 1, 2014	Outstanding Achievement for Editorial in a Feature Production	Darren T. Holmes	Nominated	
Annie Awards	February 1, 2014	Outstanding Achievement for Music in a Feature Production	Alan Silvestri	Nominated	
Annie Awards	February 1, 2014	Outstanding Achievement for Production Design in an Animated Feature Production	Christophe Lautrette, Paul Duncan, and Dominique R. Louis	Nominated	
Annie Awards	February 1, 2014	Outstanding Achievement for Storyboarding in a Feature Production	Steven MacLeod	Nominated	
BMI Film & TV Awards	May 15, 2013	BMI Film Music Awards	Alan Silvestri (Note: Also for The Avengers (2012) and Flight (2012))	Won	
British Academy Children's Awards	November 24, 2013	BAFTA Kid's Vote (Feature Film)	The Croods	Nominated	
Chicago Film Critics Association Awards	December 16, 2013	Best Animated Film	The Croods	Nominated	
Cinema Audio Society Awards	February 22, 2014	Outstanding Achievement in Sound Mixing for a Motion Picture – Animated	Tighe Sheldon, Randy Thom, Gary A. Rizzo, Dennis Sands, and Corey Tyler	Nominated	
Critics' Choice Movie Awards	January 16, 2014	Best Animated Feature	The Croods	Nominated	
Georgia Film Critics Association Awards	January 10, 2014	Best Animated Film	The Croods	Nominated	
Golden Globe Awards	January 12, 2014	Best Animated Feature Film	The Croods	Nominated	
Golden Reel Awards	February 16, 2014	Outstanding Achievement in Sound Editing – Sound Effects, Foley, Dialogue and ADR for Animated Feature Film	Randy Thom and Jonathan Null	Nominated	
Houston Film Critics Society Awards	December 15, 2013	Best Animated Film	The Croods	Nominated	
International Film Music Critics Association Awards	February 20, 2014	Best Original Score for an Animated Film	Alan Silvestri	Nominated	
Movieguide Awards	February 7, 2014	Best Movie for Families	The Croods	Nominated	
Producers Guild of America Awards	January 19, 2014	Best Animated Motion Picture	Kristine Belson and Jane Hartwell	Nominated	
San Diego Film Critics Society Awards	December 11, 2013	Best Animated Film	The Croods	Nominated	
San Francisco Film Critics Circle Awards	December 15, 2013	Best Animated Feature	The Croods	Nominated	
Satellite Awards	February 23, 2014	Best Animated or Mixed Media Feature	The Croods	Nominated	
Satellite Awards	February 23, 2014	Best Visual Effects	Markus Manninen and Matt Baer	Nominated	
Satellite Awards	February 23, 2014	Outstanding Youth Blu-Ray/DVD	The Croods	Nominated	
Toronto Film Critics Association Awards	December 17, 2013	Best Animated Feature	The Croods	Runner-up (Note: Shared with Frozen (2013))	
Visual Effects Society Awards	February 12, 2014	Outstanding Visual Effects in an Animated Feature	Jane Hartwell, Chris Sanders, Kirk DeMicco, and Markus Manninen	Nominated	
Visual Effects Society Awards	February 12, 2014	Outstanding Animated Performance in an Animated Feature	Line Andersen, Won Young Byun, Koji Morihiro, and Chris De St. Jeor for "Eep"	Nominated	
Visual Effects Society Awards	February 12, 2014	Outstanding Created Environment in an Animated Feature	Jonathan Harman, Violette Sacre-Shaik, Benjamin Venancie, and Philippe Brochu for "The Maze"	Nominated	
Visual Effects Society Awards	February 12, 2014	Outstanding Effects Simulations in an Animated Feature	Jeff Budsberg, Andre Le Blanc, Jason Mayer, and Michael Losure	Nominated	
Washington D.C. Area Film Critics Association Awards	December 9, 2013	Best Animated Feature	The Croods	Nominated	
Women Film Critics Circle Awards	December 16, 2013	Best Animated Females	The Croods	Runner-up	

== Soundtrack ==
The Croods

Film score by Alan Silvestri
- Released: March 15, 2013
- Recorded: 2012
- Genre: Score
- Length: 70:16
- Label: Relativity Music Group

Alan Silvestri film scores chronology
Flight (2012)	The Croods (2013)	Red 2 (2013)

Alan Silvestri, who previously collaborated with co-director Chris Sanders on Lilo & Stitch (2002), composed the film's original score, which was released digitally on March 15, 2013, by Relativity Music Group, and on CD on March 26, 2013, by Sony Classical. The soundtrack also includes "Shine Your Way", an original song performed by Owl City and Yuna.

Track listing:
No.	Title	Length
1.	"Shine Your Way" (performed by Owl City and Yuna)	3:27
2.	"Prologue"	2:07
3.	"Smash and Grab (feat. USC Marching Band)"	4:09
4.	"Bear Owl Escape"	2:45
5.	"Eep and the Warthog"	3:52
6.	"Teaching Fire to Tiger Girl"	1:54
7.	"Exploring New Dangers"	3:33
8.	"Piranhakeets"	2:25
9.	"Fire and Corn"	2:06
10.	"Turkey Fish Follies"	4:17
11.	"Going Guys Way"	3:15
12.	"Story Time"	3:55
13.	"Family Maze"	3:21
14.	"Star Canopy"	2:07
15.	"Grug Flips His Lid"	1:44
16.	"Planet Collapse"	1:44
17.	"We'll Die If We Stay Here"	5:28
18.	"Cave Painting"	1:12
19.	"Big Idea"	2:34
20.	"Epilogue"	4:25
21.	"Cave Painting Theme"	2:52
22.	"The Crood's Family Theme"	5:54
23.	"Cantina Croods"	1:12
Total length:		70:16

iTunes bonus track:
No.	Title	Length
24.	"Shine Your Way (Adam Young Remix)" (performed by Owl City feat. Yuna)	3:19

== Video games ==
A video game based on the film, titled The Croods: Prehistoric Party!, was released on March 19, 2013. Developed by Torus Games and published by D3 Publisher in North America, and in PAL regions by Namco Bandai Games, it was adapted for Wii U, Wii, Nintendo 3DS, and Nintendo DS. The game enables players to take the members of the Croods family on an adventure through 30 party style mini games. It received mainly negative reviews.

A mobile game, titled The Croods, which is a village building game was developed and published by Rovio, the creator of Angry Birds. It was released on March 14, 2013, for the iOS and Android platforms.

== Expanded franchise ==
=== Sequel ===
On April 17, 2013, DreamWorks Animation had started developing a sequel to the film, with Sanders and DeMicco set to return as directors. According to DeMicco, the sequel would focus on Ugga and motherhood, making it "the first chapter of society," expanding on the first film, which is about "the last chapter of the caveman."

On September 9, 2013, it had been confirmed that Cage, Stone, and Reynolds would reprise their roles in the sequel. On June 12, 2014, it was announced that the sequel would be released on November 3, 2017. On September 21, 2014, the film's release date was delayed to December 22, 2017. On May 21, 2015, Leslie Mann and Kat Dennings had joined the voice cast. Mann would lend her voice to Hope Betterman, an upscale mother of the rival family, while Dennings would voice her daughter, Dawn. It was also confirmed that Keener and Duke would also reprise their roles. On August 9, 2016, nearing NBCUniversal/Comcast's impending acquisition of DreamWorks Animation, 20th Century Fox removed the film from its release schedule. The film would be instead released by Universal Pictures sometime in 2018. On August 23, 2016, it was announced that The Lego Movie and Hotel Transylvania co-writers Kevin and Dan Hageman will rewrite the script.

On November 11, 2016, DreamWorks announced that production for the sequel was cancelled. According to reports, there had been doubts about proceeding with the project before Universal's acquisition of DreamWorks, and it was DreamWorks' decision to cancel the film. Following this, DeMicco, the co-director of the first film, left DreamWorks to work as director on Vivo for Sony Pictures Animation. On September 19, 2017, DreamWorks and Universal announced that the film was back in production with a release date of September 18, 2020. It was also confirmed that the original actors would reprise their roles. On October 18, 2017, it was announced that Joel Crawford will direct the film, replacing Sanders following his departure from DreamWorks to direct The Call of the Wild for 20th Century Fox (currently known as 20th Century Studios), with Mark Swift serving as producer. This marks as Crawford's directorial debut. On October 5, 2018, it was announced that Peter Dinklage had joined the cast to voice Phil Betterman. On April 12, 2019, the film's release date was delayed to December 23, 2020. On October 29, 2019, DreamWorks announced that Kelly Marie Tran had replaced Dennings as Dawn while Mann was still confirmed to be part of the cast.

Production continued remotely during the COVID-19 pandemic with on-site work at the DreamWorks lot suspended.

=== Television series ===
A traditionally-animated television series based on the film, titled Dawn of the Croods, debuted on December 24, 2015, on Netflix. None of the original cast members that voiced the Croods family in the film reprise their roles in the series. The voice cast consists of Dan Milano as Grug, Stephanie Lemelin as Eep, Cree Summer as Ugga, A.J. LoCascio as Thunk, Laraine Newman as Gran, and Grey Griffin as Sandy.

A second animated series, this time CGI-animated, was announced titled The Croods: Family Tree, which was released simultaneously on Peacock and Hulu on September 23, 2021. Tran reprises her role as Dawn from the sequel while LoCascio reprises his role as Thunk from the previous series. The new voice cast features, Amy Landecker as Ugga, Kiff VandenHeuvel as Grug, Ally Dixon as Eep, Artemis Pebdani as Gran, Darin Brooks as Guy, Matthew Waterson as Phil, and Amy Rosoff as Hope.

== Legacy ==
The film was referenced in 2021 by Australian Prime Minister Scott Morrison after his comparison between his government's COVID-19 lockdown exit roadmap strategy and the film, saying "we can't stay in the cave".

In May 2025, memes referencing the movie emerged on social media. The most common version of the meme was of main character Grug saying "rhymes with Grug."
