= 41st Annie Awards =

US media awards ceremony held in 2013

- Date: February 1, 2014
- Site: Royce Hall; Los Angeles, California, U.S.
- Hosted by: Patrick Warburton
- Organized by: ASIFA-Hollywood

Highlights
- Best Animated Feature: Frozen
- Best Direction: Chris Buck and Jennifer Lee; Frozen
- Most awards: Frozen (5)
- Most nominations: Frozen and Monsters University (10)

The 41st Annual Annie Awards honoring excellence in the field of animation of 2013 were held on February 1, 2014, at the University of California, Los Angeles's Royce Hall in Los Angeles, California, presenting in 35 categories. On December 2, 2013, the nominations for Annie Awards were announced.

== Production nominees ==
Best Animated Feature	Best Animated Special Production
Frozen – Walt Disney Pictures / Walt Disney Animation Studios: A Letter to Momo – GKIDS; Despicable Me 2 – Universal Pictures / Illumination Entertainment; Ernest & Celestine – GKIDS; Monsters University – Walt Disney Pictures / Pixar; The Croods – DreamWorks Animation; The Wind Rises – Studio Ghibli / Touchstone Pictures	Chipotle Scarecrow – Chipotle Creative Department, Moonbot Studios, CAA Marketing: Listening Is an Act of Love – StoryCorps; Room on the Broom – Magic Light Pictures; Toy Story OF TERROR! – Pixar
Best Animated Short Subject	Best Animated TV/Broadcast Commercial
Get a Horse! – Walt Disney Animation Studios: Despicable Me 2 - Puppy – Illumination Entertainment/Universal Pictures; Gloria Victoria – National Film Board of Canada; My Mom is an Airplane – Acme Filmworks; The Numberlys – Moonbot Studios	Despicable Me 2 – Cinemark – Illumination Entertainment/Universal Pictures: Pictures Sound of the Woods – Acme Filmworks; The Polar Bears Movie – Scott Free Productions/RSA Films, Animal Logic, CAA Marketing
Best General Audience Animated TV/Broadcast Production For Preschool Children	Best Animated TV/Broadcast Production For Children's Audience
Disney's Sofia the First – Disney Television Animation: Bubble Guppies – Nickelodeon Productions/Nelvana; Doc McStuffins – Brown Bag Films; Justin Time – Guru Studio; Peter Rabbit – Nickelodeon Productions/Silvergate Media	Adventure Time – Cartoon Network Studios: Beware the Batman – Warner Bros. Animation; Disney's Gravity Falls – Disney Television Animation; Kung Fu Panda: Legends of Awesomeness – Nickelodeon Animation Studio; Regular Show – Cartoon Network Studios; Scaredy Squirrel – Nelvana Ltd.; Teen Titans Go! – Warner Bros. Animation; The Legend of Korra – Nickelodeon Animation Studio
Best General Audience Animated TV/Broadcast Production	Best Animated Video Game
Futurama – 20th Century Fox Television: Archer – FX Networks; Bob's Burgers – Bento Box Entertainment; Disney's Tron Uprising – Disney Television Animation; Motorcity – Titmouse Inc.	The Last of Us – Naughty Dog: Diggs Nightcrawler – Moonbot Studios, Sony London Studio, Exient; Tiny Thief – 5 ANTS
Best Student Film	
Wedding Cake – Filmakademie Baden-Wuerttemberg: Chicken or the Egg – Ringling College of Art and Design; Kellerkind – Filmakademie Baden-Wuerttemberg; Miss Todd – Kristina Yee; Move Mountain – Kirsten Lepore; SEMÃ•FORO – University of Southern California; The Final Straw – Ringling College of Art and Design; Trusts & Estates – CalArts	

== Individual achievement categories ==
Outstanding Achievement, Animated Effects in an Animated Production	Outstanding Achievement, Animated Effects in a Live Action Production
Jeff Budsberg, Andre Le Blanc, Louis Flores, Jason Mayer – The Croods – DreamWorks Animation: Alen Lai, David Quirus, Diego Garzon Sanchez, Ilan Gabai – Epic – Blue Sky Studios; David Jones – Dragons: Defenders of Berk – DreamWorks Animation; Joshua Jenny, Jason Johnston, Matthew Wong, Eric Froemling, Enrique Vila – Monsters University – Pixar; Greg Gladstone, Nikita Pavlov, Allen Ruilova, Matt Titus, Can Yuksel – Turbo – DreamWorks Animation	Michael Balog, Ryan Hopkins, Patrick Conran, Florian Witzel – Pacific Rim – Industrial Light & Magic: Jonathan Paquin, Brian Goodwin, Gray Horsfield, Mathieu Chardonnet, Adrien Toupet – Man Of Steel – Weta Digital; Ben O'Brien, Karin Cooper, Lee Uren, Chris Root – Star Trek: Into Darkness – Industrial Light & Magic; Dan Pearson, Jay Cooper, Jeff Grebe, Amelia Chenoweth – Star Trek: Into Darkness – Industrial Light & Magic
Outstanding Achievement, Character Animation in an Animated Television/Broadcast Production	Outstanding Achievement, Character Animation in a Feature Production
Kureha Yokoo – Toy Story OF TERROR! – Pixar: Brad Schaffer – Friendship All-Stars of Friendship: Wrong Number – Stoopid Buddy Stoodios; Eric Urban – Ubermansion – Stoopid Buddy Stoodios; JC Tran Quang Thieu – Toy Story OF TERROR! – Pixar; David DeVan – Toy Story OF TERROR! – Pixar; Keith Kellogg – Star Wars: The Clone Wars – Lucasfilm Animation	Jakob Jensen – The Croods – DreamWorks Animation: Thom Roberts – Epic – Blue Sky Studios; Jonathan Del Val – Despicable Me 2 – Illumination Entertainment/Universal Pictures; John Chun Chiu Lee – Monsters University – Pixar; Kitaro Kosaka – The Wind Rises - Studio Ghibli/Touchstone Pictures; Tony Smeed – Frozen – Walt Disney Animation Studios; Patrick Imbert – Ernest & Celestine – GKIDS
Outstanding Achievement, Character Animation in a Live Action Production	Outstanding Achievement, Character Design in an Animated TV/Broadcast Production
Jeff Capogreco, Jedrzej Wojtowicz, Kevin Estey, Alessandro Bonora, Gino Acevedo – The Hobbit: An Unexpected Journey – Gollum – Weta Digital: Dave Clayton, Simeon Duncombe, Jung Min Chang, Matthew Cioffi, Guillame Francois – The Hobbit: An Unexpected Journey – Goblin King – Weta Digital; Hal Hickel, Chris Lentz, Derrick Carlin, Steve Rawlins, Kyle Winkelman – Pacific Rim – Industrial Light & Magic	Paul Rudish – Disney's Mickey Mouse – Disney Television Animation: Craig McCracken – Disney's Wander Over Yonder – Disney Television Animation; Andy Bialk – The Awesomes – Bento Box Entertainment; Ben Adams – Regular Show – Cartoon Network Studios; Danny Hynes, Colin Howard – Steven Universe – Cartoon Network Studios
Outstanding Achievement, Character Design in an Animated Feature Production	Outstanding Achievement, Directing in an Animated TV/Broadcast Production
Carter Goodrich, Takao Noguchi, Shane Prigmore – The Croods – DreamWorks Animation: Sylvain Deboissy, Shannon Tindle – Turbo – DreamWorks Animation; Craig Kellman – Cloudy With A Chance of Meatballs 2 – Sony Pictures Animation; Chris Sasaki – Monsters University – Pixar; Christophe Lourdelet – A Monster in Paris – Shout! Factory; Eric Guillon – Despicable Me 2 – Illumination Entertainment/Universal Pictures; Bill Schwab – Frozen – Walt Disney Animation Studios	Angus MacLane – Toy Story OF TERROR! – Pixar: Colin Heck – The Legend of Korra – Nickelodeon Animation; Elaine Bogan – Dragons: Defenders of Berk – DreamWorks Animation; Stephan Franck – The Smurfs: The Legend of Smurfy Hollow – Sony Pictures Animation; John Aoshima – Disney's Gravity Falls – Disney Television Animation; Aaron Springer – Disney's Mickey Mouse – Disney Television Animation; Harold Harris – Justin Time – Guru Studio
Outstanding Achievement, Directing in an Animated Feature Production	Outstanding Achievement, Music in an Animated TV/Broadcast Production
Chris Buck, Jennifer Lee – Frozen – Walt Disney Animation Studios: Chris Sanders, Kirk DeMicco – The Croods – DreamWorks Animation; David Soren – Turbo – DreamWorks Animation; Chris Wedge – Epic – Blue Sky Studios; Benjamin Renner, Vincent Patar, Stéphane Aubier – Ernest & Celestine – GKIDS	Christopher Willis – Disney's Mickey Mouse – Disney Television Animation: Alan Williams – Estefan – BYU Center for Animation; Guy Moon – T.U.F.F. Puppy – Nickelodeon Animation Studio; Peter Lurye, Stuart Kollmorgen, Peter Zizzo – Peter Rabbit – Nickelodeon Animation Studio; Kevin Kliesch, Craig Gerber, John Kavanaugh – Disney's Sofia the First – Disney Television Animation; Andy Bean – Disney's Wander Over Yonder – Disney Television Animation
Outstanding Achievement, Music in an Animated Feature Production	Outstanding Achievement, Production Design in an Animated TV/Broadcast Production
Kristen Anderson-Lopez, Robert Lopez, Christophe Beck – Frozen – Walt Disney Animation Studios: Alan Silvestri – The Croods – DreamWorks Animation; Henry Jackman – Turbo – DreamWorks Animation; Mark Mothersbaugh – Cloudy with a Chance of Meatballs 2 – Sony Pictures Animation; Heitor Pereira, Pharrell Williams – Despicable Me 2 – Illumination Entertainment/Universal Pictures; Danny Elfman – Epic – Blue Sky Studios; Randy Newman – Monsters University – Pixar; Dominic Lewis – Free Birds – Reel FX	Angela Sung, William Niu, Christine Bian, Emily Tetri, Frederic Stewart – The Legend of Korra – Nickelodeon Animation Studio: Liz Artinian, Ray Feldman, Chris Fisher, George Fort – The Venture Bros. "What Color is Your Cleansuit?" – Titmouse Inc.; Steven Sugar, Emily Walus, Sam Bosma, Elle Michalka, Amanda Winterstein – Steven Universe "Gem Glow" – Cartoon Network Studios; Lynna Blankenship, Dima Malanitchev, Debbie Peterson, Charles Ragins, Jefferson R. Weekley – The Simpsons "Treehouse of Horror XXIV" Gracie; Films in Association with 20th Century Fox TV; Christophe Vacher – Transformers Prime 'Beast Hunters' – Hasbro Studios; Nick Jennings, Sandra Calleros, Teri Shikasho, Ron Russell, Martin Ansolebehere – Adventure Time – Cartoon Network Studios
Outstanding Achievement, Production Design in an Animated Feature Production	Outstanding Achievement, Storyboarding in an Animated TV/Broadcast Production
Michael Giaimo, Lisa Keene, David Womersley – Frozen – Walt Disney Animation Studios: Christophe Lautrette, Paul Duncan, Dominique R. Louis – The Croods – DreamWorks Animation; Yarrow Cheney, Eric Guillon – Despicable Me 2 – Illumination Entertainment/Universal Pictures; Michael Knapp, Greg Couch, William Joyce – Epic – Blue Sky Studios; Zaza, Zyk – Ernest & Celestine – GKIDS; Ricky Nierva, Robert Kondo, Daisuke "Dice" Tsutsumi – Monsters University – Pixar	Daniel Chong – Toy Story of TERROR! – Pixar: Piero Piluso – Monsters vs. Aliens – Nickelodeon Animation Studio; Douglas Lovelace – Dragons: Riders of Berk – DreamWorks Animation; Adam Ford, Deke Wightman, Kevin Mellon, Justin Wagner, Benji Williams – Archer – FX Networks; Alonso Ramos-Ramirez – Disney's Mickey Mouse – Disney Television Animation; Alonso Ramos-Ramirez – Gravity Falls – Disney Television Animation; Guillermo del Toro, Guy Davis, Ralph Sosa – The Simpsons -- "Treehouse of Horror XXIV" -- Gracie Films in Association with 20th Century Fox TV; Paul Watling – Justin Time – Guru Studio
Outstanding Achievement, Storyboarding in an Animated Feature Production	Outstanding Achievement, Voice Acting in an Animated TV/Broadcast Production
Dean Kelly - Monsters University - Pixar: Steven MacLeod - The Croods - DreamWorks Animation; Eric Favela – Despicable Me 2 - Illumination Entertainment/Universal Pictures; Jason Hand - Planes - Disneytoon Studios; John Ripa - Frozen - Walt Disney Animation Studios	Tom Kenny as the voice of Ice King - Adventure Time - Cartoon Network Studios: Eric Bauza as the voice of Foop - The Fairly OddParents - Nickelodeon Animation Studio; Bill Farmer as the voice of Goofy - Mickey Mouse - Disney Television Animation; Chris Diamantopoulos as the voice of Mickey Mouse - Mickey Mouse - Disney Television Animation; Mark Hamill as the voice of Skips and Walks - Regular Show - Cartoon Network Studios
Outstanding Achievement, Voice Acting in an Animated Feature Production	Outstanding Achievement, Writing in an Animated TV/Broadcast Production
Josh Gad as the voice of Olaf - Frozen - Walt Disney Animation Studios: Paul Giamatti as the voice of Chet - Turbo - DreamWorks Animation; Terry Crews as the voice of Earl – Cloudy with a Chance of Meatballs 2 - Sony Pictures Animation; Kristen Wiig as the voice of Lucy – Despicable Me 2 - Illumination Entertainment/Universal Pictures; Steve Carell as the voice of Gru – Despicable Me 2 - Illumination Entertainment/Universal Pictures; Pierre Coffin as the voice of Minions - Despicable Me 2 - Illumination Entertainment/Universal Pictures; Billy Crystal as the voice of Mike – Monsters University – Pixar	Lewis Morton - Futurama - 20th Century Fox Television: Katie Mattila - Kung Fu Panda: Legends of Awesomeness - Nickelodeon Animation Studio; Ian Maxtone-Graham and Billy Kimball - The Simpsons - "Dark Knight Court" – Gracie Films in association with 20th Century Fox; Matt Price, John Infantino, Mike Roth, Michele Cavin, and Sean Szeles - Regular Show - Cartoon Network Studios; Michael Price - The Simpsons - "Dangers on a Train" – Gracie Films in association with 20th Century Fox
Outstanding Achievement, Writing in an Animated Feature Production	Outstanding Achievement, Editorial in an Animated TV/Broadcast Production
Hayao Miyazaki - The Wind Rises - Studio Ghibli/Touchstone Pictures/The Walt Disney Studios: Daniel Pennac - Ernest & Celestine - GKIDS; Daniel Gerson, Robert L. Baird, Dan Scanlon - Monsters University - Pixar; Jennifer Lee - Frozen - Walt Disney Animation Studios	Illya Owens - Mickey Mouse - Disney Television Animation: Adam Arnold, Hugo Morales, and Davrick Waltjen - Kung Fu Panda: Legends of Awesomeness - Nickelodeon Animation Studio; Myra Lopez, Ana Adams, and Justin Baker - Teenage Mutant Ninja Turtles - Nickelodeon Animation Studio; Lynn Hobson - Dragons: Defenders of Berk - DreamWorks Animation; Axel Geddes, Kathy Graves, and Chloe Kloezeman - Toy Story OF TERROR! – Pixar; Paul D. Calder - Futurama - 20th Century Fox Television; Paul Douglas - Adventure Time - Cartoon Network Studios; Jason W.A. Tucker - Star Wars: The Clone Wars - Lucasfilm Animation
Outstanding Achievement, Editorial in an Animated Feature Production
Greg Snyder, Gregory Amundson, and Steve Bloom - Monsters University - Pixar: Darren Holmes - The Croods - DreamWorks Animation; James Ryan - Turbo - DreamWorks Animation; Fabienne Alvarez-Giro - Ernest & Celestine - GKIDS; Jeff Draheim - Frozen - Walt Disney Animation Studios

== Awards ==
Winsor McCay Award
Katsuhiro Otomo, Steven Spielberg, and Phil Tippett
June Foray Award
Alice Davis
Ub Iwerks Award
DZED Systems for Dragonframe stop-motion animation software
Special Achievement Award
Creative Talent Network (CTN) Animation eXpo
Certificate of Merit
I Know That Voice
