= Dawn of the Croods =

American animated TV series (2015–2017)

- Official release poster
- Genre: Animated sitcom Adventure
- Based on: Characters created by John Cleese, Kirk DeMicco and Chris Sanders
- Developed by: Brendan Hay
- Voices of: Grey Griffin; Stephanie Lemelin; A.J. LoCascio; Dan Milano; Laraine Newman; Cree Summer
- Theme music composer: John Van Tongeren
- Composers: Gabriel Mann; Rebecca Kneubuhl
- Country of origin: United States
- No. of seasons: 4
- No. of episodes: 52 (89 segments) (list of episodes)

Production
- Executive producer: Brendan Hay
- Running time: 23 minutes
- Production company: DreamWorks Animation Television

Original release
- Network: Netflix
- Release: December 24, 2015 – July 7, 2017

Related
- The Croods (2013); The Croods: Family Tree (2021–2023)

Dawn of the Croods is an American 2D-animated television sitcom series that is produced by DreamWorks Animation. The series is a prequel to the 2013 animated film The Croods. It premiered on December 24, 2015, on Netflix. The second season premiered on August 26, 2016, third season on April 7, 2017, and fourth and final season on July 7, 2017. Sam Riegel was the voice director for the first two seasons, and Brendan Hay replaced him for the last two. It also aired on Family Channel and Family Chrgd in Canada.

== Plot ==
The adventures of the series takes place before the events of the film, with Eep and the family having new friends, and facing off against new enemy creatures.

== Cast ==
- Dan Milano as Grug, Bud, Womp
- Cree Summer as Ugga, Pat, Clip, Pup Howler
- Stephanie Lemelin as Eep
- A.J. LoCascio as Thunk, Baitsy, Steve
- Grey Griffin as Sandy, Lerk
- Laraine Newman as Gran, One-Eyed Amber Mosh, Pram

=== Additional voices ===
- Dee Bradley Baker as Bulk Boor, Squawk, Bearowl, Creatures, Moler Bear, Mow, Earl, Old Man Root, Yelp
- Dominic Catrambone as Sulk Boor, Kevin, Fan, Night Mare, Ow the Dentist, Cave Teen, Bag, Guy
- Jim Cummings as Little Mantrap
- Ana Gasteyer as Meep Boor
- Thomas Lennon as Crud, Munk
- Chris Parnell as Snoot Boor
- Chris Sanders as Belt the Sloth

== Episodes ==
Season	Segments	Episodes	Originally released
1	17	13	December 24, 2015
2	24	13	August 26, 2016
3	24	13	April 7, 2017
4	24	13	July 7, 2017

On July 9, 2017, executive producer Hay replied on Twitter to a question about whether the fourth season would be the last season, saying that it "most likely" would be.

== Production ==
In contrast to the computer-animated film, the series is 2D-animated. The series' creators wanted to make it more "cartoonish", but found doing "squash and stretch" in CG too expensive for television. Different animation technique also helped the series to stand out from the feature film, which was concurrently shown on Netflix. The first three episodes were animated in Toon Boom Harmony by Vancouver's Bardel Entertainment. DreamWorks soon found that Harmony was not the best fit for animating scenes that contained multiple characters at once. The rest of the episodes were traditionally hand-drawn by South Korean studios: EMation, NE4U, and Dong Woo Animation.

== Awards and nominations ==
Year	Award	Category	Nominee	Result
2016	Annie Award	Outstanding Achievement, Production Design in an Animated TV/Broadcast Production	Jonathan Pyun, Aaron Spurgeon, Baptiste Lucas, Margaret Wuller and Ethan Becker (for "Garden of Eaten")	Nominated
2016	Annie Award	Outstanding Achievement, Voice Acting in an Animated TV/Broadcast Production	Grey Griffin (for Lerk)	Nominated
2016	Annie Award	Outstanding Achievement, Voice Acting in an Animated TV/Broadcast Production	Laraine Newman (for Amber)	Nominated
