= The Croods (video game) =

2013 video game

- Developer: Rovio Entertainment
- Publisher: Rovio Entertainment
- Platforms: iOS, Android
- Release: March 14, 2013
- Genre: Life simulation
- Mode: Single-player

The Croods is a life simulation game developed and published by Rovio Entertainment for iOS and Android in 2013. It is based on the 2013 film of the same name.

== Reception ==
Reception

Aggregate score
Aggregator	Score
Metacritic	40/100

Review scores
Publication	Score
Gamezebo	2/5
MacLife	1.5/5
Pocket Gamer	2.5/5
Digital Spy	1/5

The iOS version received "unfavorable" reviews according to the review aggregation website Metacritic.
