= Jane Hartwell =

American film producer

- Occupation: Film producer
- Years active: 1987–present

Jane Hartwell is an American film producer, as well as a variety of other filmography positions. She is known for her work in animation, most notably for The Croods. She received two award nominations for The Croods: the Producers Guild of America Award and the Visual Effects Society award.

== Biography ==
Hartwell graduated from Barnard College. San Francisco's Colossal Pictures in 1987 is where she started here career in production. She then spent four years working on multiple different commercial productions, and Italian documentaries in Rome. While her time in Rome, Hartwell worked on the filming of Francis Ford Coppola's The Godfather Part III. When Hartwell moved back to the United States, she went back to work for Colossal Pictures as a production manager and producer for multiple commercials. She then worked the film James and the Giant Peach as the associate production manager. For the company's first CG animated film, Antz, Hartwell worked as the production manager. She then became the associate producer for Shrek. In 2001, DreamWorks Studio in Glendale, California, promoted Hartwell to Head of Digital Production to accommodate the plans of the studio's growth. Hartwell also helped lead the company transition from traditional 2D animation to computer generated animation. There Hartwell produced The Croods with Kristine Belson under two directors. Hartwell used 3D to try to engage viewers by using 3D animation throughout the production of the movie.

== Filmography ==
=== Producer ===
- UglyDolls (2019)
- The Croods (2013)
- Shrek (2001) (Associate Producer)
- Antz (1998) (Production Manager)

=== Cast ===
- Made in Hollywood: Teen Edition: The Creative Team Behind The Croods (2013)
