= Jeff Budsberg =

Visual effects artist (born 1982)

- Born: Jeffrey Blaine Budsberg; 28 June 1982 (age 43); Houston, Texas
- Occupation: Visual effects artist
- Years active: 2006–present

Jeffrey Blaine Budsberg (born 28 June 1982) is a visual effects artist.

He won a 2014 Annie Award for Outstanding Achievement, Animated Effects in an Animated Production for his work on The Croods. Budsberg won the award along with Andre Le Blanc, Louis Flores and Jason Mayer.

He won a 2015 Academy Award in Technical Achievement and was nominated for his second Annie in 2017.

== Selected filmography ==
- Shrek Forever After (2010)
- The Croods (2014)
- Kung Fu Panda 3 (2016)
- The Bad Guys (2022)
