= Kristine Belson =

American film producer

- Born: United States
- Education: Trinity College
- Occupation: Film producer
- Years active: 1999-present
- Employers: DreamWorks Animation (2005–2014); Sony Pictures Animation (2015–present)
- Title: President
- Parent: Jerry Belson (father)
- Relatives: Monica Johnson (aunt)

Kristine Belson is a film producer and the president of Sony Pictures Animation.

Belson's mother was a member of the Hollywood Foreign Press Association, and her father, Jerry Belson, was a comedy writer for television and film. Belson graduated from Trinity College in 1986.

In 1994, she joined Turner Pictures, before she and Matt Tolmach joined Columbia Pictures in 1997 shortly after Turner was acquired by Time Warner.

In 2005, Belson joined DreamWorks Animation as head of development, where she oversaw the development and acquisition of all feature film projects for the company. There she also served as executive producer on How to Train Your Dragon (2010). Belson and her fellow producers were nominated for an Academy Award for Best Animated Feature for the 2013 film The Croods.

In January 2015, she was named the president of Sony Pictures Animation, tasked to lead the development and production of existing and original materials.
