= Chris Sanders =

American filmmaker, animator, and voice actor (born 1962)

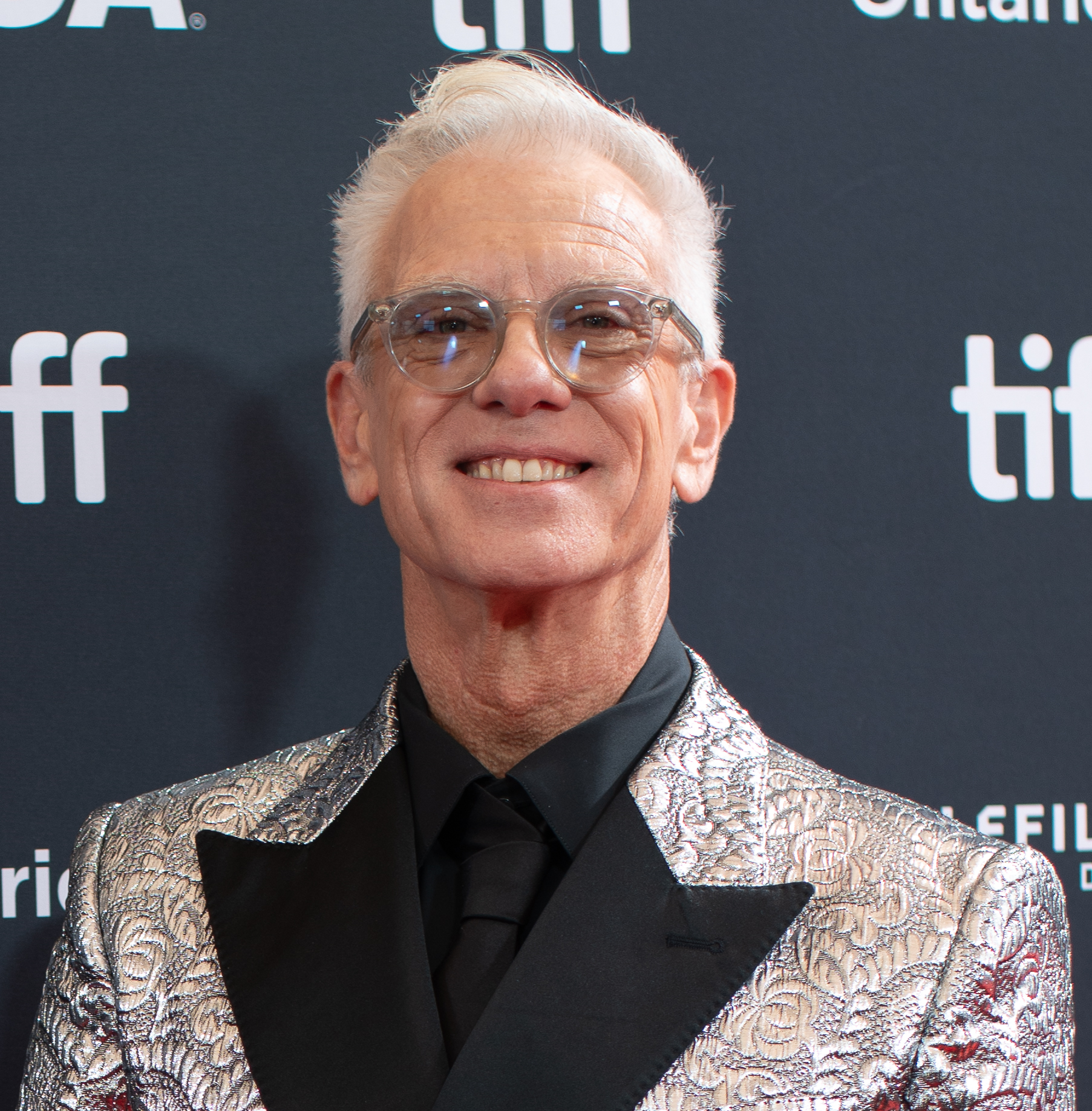
- Sanders at the 2024 Toronto International Film Festival
- Born: Christopher Michael Sanders; March 12, 1962 (age 64); Colorado Springs, Colorado, U.S.
- Education: California Institute of the Arts (BFA)
- Occupations: Film director; screenwriter; producer; animator; illustrator; voice actor
- Years active: 1984–present
- Employers: Walt Disney Animation Studios (1988–2007); DreamWorks Animation (2007–present); Walt Disney Pictures (2025–present)
- Spouse: Jessica Steele-Sanders (m. 2015)
- Children: 1

Christopher Michael Sanders (born March 12, 1962) is an American filmmaker, animator, and voice actor. His credits include Lilo & Stitch (2002) for Walt Disney Animation Studios, and How to Train Your Dragon (2010), both of which he co-wrote and directed with Dean DeBlois; The Croods (2013) with Kirk DeMicco; and The Wild Robot (2024) for DreamWorks Animation, receiving nominations for the Academy Award for Best Animated Feature for all of them. In 2020, he made his live-action directorial debut with the adventure-drama The Call of the Wild. He created the popular Disney character Stitch in 1985, wrote the story of Lilo & Stitch, and has voiced Stitch in most of his media appearances.

As of 2026, he is writing the sequel to The Wild Robot for DreamWorks and is writing and directing the sequel to the live-action Lilo & Stitch for Walt Disney Studios.

== Early life ==
Christopher Michael Sanders was born in Colorado Springs, Colorado, on March 12, 1962.

He had been intensely interested in comic strips and filmmaking, especially animation, from an early age. He was the only one of three siblings in his family to borrow his father's Super 8 film camera and, with encouragement from his father towards his drawing interests, make his own comics. He later got interested in animation upon learning about the camera's single-frame feature.

He attended Arvada High School in Arvada, Colorado, graduating in 1980. He initially wanted to take art classes at the school but was dissuaded when he asked the art teacher to teach him cartooning, only for the teacher to reply, "Comics aren't art." Sanders later attended the California Institute of the Arts, graduating in 1984.

== Career ==
=== Walt Disney Animation Studios ===
Sanders created the Lilo & Stitch character Stitch in 1985, and voiced the character. Sanders continues to voice the character in nearly every Disney production to date.

Sanders began his career as a character designer for Jim Henson's Muppet Babies. He then served as lead storyboard artist for Walt Disney Animation Studios, and was a storyboard artist, artistic director, production designer, and character designer on the company's films Beauty and the Beast, Aladdin, The Lion King, and Mulan.

In 1985 Sanders created a character named "Stitch" for an unsuccessful children's book pitch. When Sanders was the head storyboard artist for Disney Feature Animation, then-Disney CEO Michael Eisner decided that, in the wake of a number of high-profile and large-budget Disney animated features during the mid-1990s, the studio might try its hand at a smaller and less expensive film. Sanders was approached by Thomas Schumacher to pitch that idea, and Sanders reused the "Stitch" character he came up with. The storyline required a remote, non-urban location, so Sanders chose Kauaʻi as the location. Stitch became the central character of the 2002 film Lilo & Stitch, which Sanders co-directed and co-wrote with Dean DeBlois. Sanders would also end up voicing the character he created for the film. The film's commercial and critical success spawned a franchise with three sequel films and three television series, with Sanders reprising his role of Stitch throughout the original 2002–06 run of the franchise (Sanders did not reprise his role for the English dub of the anime Stitch! or the English-language-produced Chinese animated series Stitch & Ai, with Ben Diskin taking over the role for both series), as well in several later Disney crossover works such as Kingdom Hearts Birth by Sleep, Kinect: Disneyland Adventures, and the Disney Infinity series.

In the late 1980s, Sanders created an allegorical picture book entitled The Big Bear Aircraft Company, with the subheading "A book for the big retreat" clarifying that it was created for a Disney offsite event. The Big Bear Aircraft Company is a thinly disguised version of Disney itself, and the book is critical of the creative process at the company, which prioritized "big ideas, figuring they will be big successes" and noted that if proposed aircraft (i.e., movie ideas) "don't look the same as the ones [that were] built before, [the boss, Big Bear] gets uncomfortable." After handing each idea pitched by the "visual engineer" to a writer who "likes airplanes" but "has actually never worked on one before, and couldn't tell you for sure what makes one fly", the story states the assigned writer "is guaranteed of making the same mistakes every time. He will make his airplane look like everyone he's seen before ..." In the end, the head of the company, Big Bear, gets an airplane that is "a lot like last year's; not very inspiring and not very memorable. But people bought it before, and they'll probably buy it again. By playing it safe, he's insured his company's survival." However, since it is not the only aircraft company, these policies are destined to leave the company vulnerable to more imaginative competitors "with its wings of good reputation all shot off." The story concludes that Big Bear should instead give the visual engineers "the two things they need to do their job: Bear's trust and time" to allow smaller, more innovative ideas to flourish. Years later, to explain his motivation regarding the piece, Sanders wrote about his concern over "the ever-growing complexity of our films, and what I saw as an emerging pattern they were all cut from", citing the example that during the story development for Mulan, one of the major concerns was the manner of the villain's death rather than the idea that the villain had to die at all. This in turn motivated him to develop Lilo & Stitch, which he summarized as "a story about a villain who becomes a hero."

By December 2006, Sanders had been removed as the director of the upcoming Disney animated film American Dog by John Lasseter. By March 2007, Sanders had been negotiating his exit from Disney. After the departure of Sanders from Disney, directing duties were handed to Chris Williams and Byron Howard, and the film was retitled Bolt. Sanders later stated he had no ill will over being removed from the film, and hoped he could revisit some of his ideas in the future. He approved of the final film and the changes made, stating: "I think it would have been frustrating if the movie were essentially the same but with only slight changes. And I suppose my scenes and storylines are still sitting there on the shelf. I could actually pull them out and do them again. But it would be completely different." Despite his departure from Disney, Sanders continues to voice Stitch in all official Disney media except for the aforementioned Eastern-produced shows. (Note: Sanders incorrectly claims that he's "done Stitch's voice for everything since the first film," not acknowledging Stitch! or Stitch & Ai and Ben Diskin's English voice role for those animated series. Sanders does, however, continue to provide new Stitch voice recordings as of 2025, with him saying in a February 2025 interview, "I go to the [recording] studio 10 times a year to do stuff.")

=== DreamWorks Animation ===
By March 2007, Sanders had moved to DreamWorks Animation and had then taken over as director on Crood Awakening (later renamed to The Croods), a project previously in co-production with Aardman Animations before they departed from DreamWorks. At the time, Sanders said about the move: "I've been so anxious to start working on things, and so I talked to a lot of people... I like the way DreamWorks looks at animation. Animation still has a lot of different places to go, and I don't want to miss out on a chance to try some new things with it."

On September 24, 2008, it was reported that Sanders and DeBlois would be screenwriting and directing How to Train Your Dragon for DreamWorks Animation. The film was released on March 26, 2010, and was a huge success with both critics and at the box office, grossing nearly $500 million worldwide. It was nominated for the Academy Award for Best Animated Feature and Best Original Score at the 83rd Academy Awards. The movie also won ten Annie Awards, including Best Animated Feature.

After completing How to Train Your Dragon, Sanders returned to The Croods, which was released on March 22, 2013. He shared directing and writing credits with Kirk DeMicco, who had joined in the middle of production. The film proved to be a success, grossing over $500 million. Sanders and DeMicco then worked on The Croods sequel for three and a half years, before its cancellation in late 2016. However, the sequel was revived in September 2017, although with Joel Crawford replacing both Sanders and DeMicco as director. After the sequel was out, now titled The Croods: A New Age, Sanders and DeMicco were both credited for the story while Sanders reprised his role as Belt.

=== 20th Century Studios/return to Disney ===
In October 2017, it was announced that Sanders would be directing a new film adaptation of the 1903 Jack London novel The Call of the Wild for 20th Century Fox. The film, his live-action and solo directorial debut, was released in February 2020. The film received mixed critical reception, with a 63% approval rating on Rotten Tomatoes (as of March 2024), making it the lowest-received film in Sanders's directorial career thus far, and grossed $107.6 million on a budget of $125–$150 million, becoming Sanders's first directorial box-office bomb.

While it was speculated in February 2020 that Sanders would reprise his voice role of Stitch in the live-action remake of Lilo & Stitch, he claimed in a September 2022 interview that Disney had not yet approached him on reprising the role, although he stated that he was always open to returning to voice his creation. In April 2023, it was confirmed he would reprise his role in the remake, which was released in 2025, earning over $1 billion in the global box office. Sanders would ultimately do five voice recordings for the film, each session taking about four hours, which he stated was hard for him to maintain his "Stitch voice" for such a long period of time.

=== The Wild Robot Escapes and returning to Lilo & Stitch ===
On September 28, 2023, it was revealed that Sanders would return to DreamWorks Animation to write and direct an animated film adaptation of Peter Brown's book series The Wild Robot. The film was released in September 2024 to critical acclaim. The following month, Sanders confirmed that he would be working on a sequel to the film. By March 2026, it was confirmed he was only returning as screenwriter for The Wild Robot Escapes.

On July 23, 2025, The Hollywood Reporter reported that Sanders would be writing the script for the sequel to the live-action Lilo & Stitch, which Sanders himself confirmed at a Lilo & Stitch panel held at San Diego Comic-Con two days later. The magazine later reported nearly a year later on June 12, 2026, that Sanders would also be directing the sequel, which will be his second live-action directorial effort.

== Personal life ==
Sanders married writer Jessica Steele-Sanders on May 18, 2015, on the Big Island of Hawaii. Together, they wrote an illustrated novel, titled Rescue Sirens: The Search for the Atavist (2015). He has a daughter named Nicole. Sanders filed for divorce in September 2023 citing "irreconcilable differences", but has since withdrawn the divorce as of 2025.

Sanders also previously drew the webcomic Kiskaloo, which follows a talking cat and former Hollywood actor who lives with two Haida sisters.

== Filmography ==
Key
†	Denotes films that have not yet been released

=== Film ===
Year	Title	Director	Writer	Other	Notes
1994	The Lion King	No	Story	Yes	Production designer
1998	Mulan	No	Yes	Yes	Story supervisor
1999	Fantasia 2000	No	Concept	No	"Pines of Rome" Segment
2002	Lilo & Stitch	Yes	Yes	Yes	With Dean DeBlois; character designer
2008	Bolt	No	Concept/Story	No	Removed as original writer/director
2010	How to Train Your Dragon	Yes	Yes	No	With Dean DeBlois
2013	The Croods	Yes	Yes	No	With Kirk DeMicco
2020	The Call of the Wild	Yes	No	No	Live-action debut
2020	The Croods: A New Age	No	Story	No	
2024	The Wild Robot	Yes	Yes	No	
2028	Lilo & Stitch 2 †	Yes	Yes	No	Filming

Animation department

Year	Title	Notes
1988	Garfield: His 9 Lives	animation stylist (segment "Diana's Piano")
1990	The Rescuers Down Under	storyboard artist / character designer / visual development
1991	Beauty and the Beast	storyboard artist / visual development artist
1992	Aladdin	storyboard artist
1994	The Lion King	storyboard artist

Executive producer

- How to Train Your Dragon 2 (2014)
- How to Train Your Dragon: The Hidden World (2019)
- How to Train Your Dragon (2025)

Voice-acting credits

Year	Title	Role	Notes
1998	Mulan	Little Brother	
1999	Tarzan	Baby Baboon	
2002	Lilo & Stitch	Stitch	Credited as "Christopher Michael Sanders"
2003	Stitch! The Movie	Stitch	Direct-to-video
2004	The Lion King 1½	Stitch	Direct-to-video, Cameo archive audio
2004	Stitch's Great Escape!	Stitch	Theme park attraction (closed 2018)
2005	Lilo & Stitch 2: Stitch Has a Glitch	Stitch	Direct-to-video
2005	The Origin of Stitch	Stitch	Direct-to-video short
2006	Leroy & Stitch	Stitch, Leroy, Leroy Clones	Direct-to-video
2013	The Croods	Belt	
2014	Penguins of Madagascar	Antarctic Penguin	
2020	The Croods: A New Age	Belt	
2023	Once Upon a Studio	Stitch	Short film, archive audio
2025	Lilo & Stitch	Stitch	
2025	Walt Disney World Railroad	Stitch	Theme park attraction originally opened in 1971, voiceover only on Main Street, U.S.A. to Fantasyland route during Beyond Big Thunder Mountain expansion construction in Frontierland
2026	Lilo & Scratch	Stitch	Short film
2028	Lilo & Stitch 2 †	Stitch	Filming

=== Television ===
Year	Title	Credited as
1984–1988	Muppet Babies	model designer
1985	Little Muppet Monsters	model designer
1986–1987	The Glo Friends	model designer
1996	Quack Pack	storyboard artist
1998–1999	Histeria!	storyboard artist

Voice actor

Year	Title	Role
2003–2006	Lilo & Stitch: The Series	Stitch, Experiment 627

=== Video games ===
Year	Title	Voice role	Notes
1999	Tarzan Activity Center	Baby Baboon	
1999	Tarzan	Baby Baboon	
2002	Disney's Lilo & Stitch	Stitch	Vocal effects only
2002	Lilo & Stitch: Trouble in Paradise	Stitch	
2002	Disney's Stitch: Experiment 626	Stitch	
2002	Lilo & Stitch: Hawaiian Adventure	Stitch	
2003	Lilo & Stitch's Island of Adventures	Stitch	DVD game
2005	Kingdom Hearts II	Stitch	English version (including add-on Final Mix+ in 2007)
2008	Disney Think Fast	Stitch	
2010	Kingdom Hearts Birth by Sleep	Stitch	English version
2011	Kinect: Disneyland Adventures	Stitch	
2013	Disney Magical World	Stitch	
2014	Disney Infinity 2.0	Stitch	
2015	Disney Infinity 3.0	Stitch	Reused audio from Disney Infinity 2.0
2023	Disney Speedstorm	Stitch	Released in early access in April 2023 and fully released in September 2023, Stitch added in a July/August 2023 update
2023	Disney Dreamlight Valley	Stitch	Released in early access in 2022, Stitch added in a December 2022 update

== Selected awards and nominations ==
Ceremony	Year	Category	Nominated work	Result	Ref.
Academy Awards	2003	Best Animated Feature	Lilo & Stitch	Nominated	
Academy Awards	2011	Best Animated Feature	How to Train Your Dragon	Nominated	
Academy Awards	2014	Best Animated Feature	The Croods	Nominated	
Academy Awards	2025	Best Animated Feature	The Wild Robot	Nominated	
Annie Awards	1998	Outstanding Writing in a Feature Production	Mulan	Won	
Annie Awards	1998	Outstanding Storyboarding in a Feature Production	Mulan	Won	
Annie Awards	2003	Outstanding Directing in a Feature Production	Lilo & Stitch	Nominated	
Annie Awards	2003	Outstanding Writing in a Feature Production	Lilo & Stitch	Nominated	
Annie Awards	2003	Outstanding Character Animation in a Feature Production	Lilo & Stitch	Nominated	
Annie Awards	2011	Outstanding Directing in a Feature Production	How to Train Your Dragon	Won	
Annie Awards	2011	Outstanding Writing in a Feature Production	How to Train Your Dragon	Won	
Annie Awards	2014	Outstanding Directing in a Feature Production	The Croods	Nominated	
Annie Awards	2025	Outstanding Directing in a Feature Production	The Wild Robot	Won	
Annie Awards	2026	Winsor McCay Award	—N/a	Won	
BAFTA Awards	2011	Best Animated Film	How to Train Your Dragon	Nominated	
BAFTA Awards	2025	Best Animated Film	The Wild Robot	Nominated	
BAFTA Awards	2025	Best Children's & Family Film	The Wild Robot	Nominated	
Critics' Choice Awards	2003	Best Animated Feature	Lilo & Stitch	Nominated	
Critics' Choice Awards	2011	Best Animated Feature	How to Train Your Dragon	Nominated	
Critics' Choice Awards	2014	Best Animated Feature	The Croods	Nominated	
Critics' Choice Awards	2025	Best Animated Feature	The Wild Robot	Won	
Golden Globes	2011	Best Animated Feature Film	How to Train Your Dragon	Nominated	
Golden Globes	2014	Best Animated Feature Film	The Croods	Nominated	
Golden Globes	2025	Best Animated Feature Film	The Wild Robot	Nominated	
