= Critics' Choice Movie Award for Best Animated Feature =

Award given by the Broadcast Film Critics Association

- Awarded for: Best animated feature film of the year
- Sponsored by: Broadcast Film Critics Association
- Date: Annually
- Country: United States
- First award: 1998
- Website: http://www.criticschoice.com

The Critics' Choice Movie Award for Best Animated Feature is an award given by the Broadcast Film Critics Association. The award was introduced in 1998. Pixar's Toy Story franchise and Sony's Spider-Verse franchise are the only franchises with multiple wins, Toy Story won three times for Toy Story 2 (1999), Toy Story 3 (2010) and Toy Story 4 (2019), Spider-Verse won for Spider-Man: Into the Spider-Verse (2018), and Spider-Man: Across the Spider-Verse (2023).

In 2020, the category and animated films were honored at the Critics' Choice Super Awards instead of the main Critics' Choice Awards. The category returned to the main show in 2021.

== Winners and nominees ==
=== 1990s ===
Year	Winner	Director(s)
1998	A Bug's Life (TIE)	John Lasseter and Andrew Stanton
1998	The Prince of Egypt (TIE)	Brenda Chapman, Steve Hickner, and Simon Wells
1998	Antz	Eric Darnell and Tim Johnson
1998	The Rugrats Movie	Igor Kovalyov and Norton Virgien
1999	Toy Story 2	John Lasseter, Lee Unkrich, and Ash Brannon

=== 2000s ===
Year	Winner	Director(s)
2000	Chicken Run	Peter Lord and Nick Park
2000	Dinosaur	Ralph Zondag and Eric Leighton
2000	The Emperor's New Groove	Mark Dindal
2001	Shrek	Andrew Adamson and Vicky Jenson
2001	Monsters, Inc.	Pete Docter, Lee Unkrich, and David Silverman
2001	Waking Life	Richard Linklater
2002	Spirited Away	Hayao Miyazaki
2002	Ice Age	Chris Wedge and Carlos Saldanha
2002	Lilo & Stitch	Chris Sanders and Dean DeBlois
2002	Spirit: Stallion of the Cimarron	Kelly Asbury and Lorna Cook
2003	Finding Nemo	Andrew Stanton and Lee Unkrich
2003	Brother Bear	Aaron Blaise and Robert Walker
2003	The Triplets of Belleville	Sylvain Chomet
2004	The Incredibles	Brad Bird
2004	The Polar Express	Robert Zemeckis
2004	Shrek 2	Andrew Adamson, Kelly Asbury, and Conrad Vernon
2005	Wallace & Gromit: The Curse of the Were-Rabbit	Nick Park and Steve Box
2005	Chicken Little	Mark Dindal
2005	Corpse Bride	Tim Burton and Mike Johnson
2005	Howl's Moving Castle	Hayao Miyazaki
2005	Madagascar	Eric Darnell and Tom McGrath
2006	Cars	John Lasseter and Joe Ranft
2006	Flushed Away	David Bowers and Sam Fell
2006	Happy Feet	George Miller, Warren Coleman, and Judy Morris
2006	Monster House	Gil Kenan
2006	Over the Hedge	Tim Johnson and Karey Kirkpatrick
2007	Ratatouille	Brad Bird and Jan Pinkava
2007	Bee Movie	Steve Hickner and Simon J. Smith
2007	Beowulf	Robert Zemeckis
2007	Persepolis	Marjane Satrapi and Vincent Paronnaud
2007	The Simpsons Movie	David Silverman
2008	WALL-E	Andrew Stanton
2008	Bolt	Chris Williams and Byron Howard
2008	Kung Fu Panda	John Stevenson and Mark Osborne
2008	Madagascar: Escape 2 Africa	Eric Darnell and Tom McGrath
2008	Waltz with Bashir	Ari Folman
2009	Up	Pete Docter and Bob Peterson
2009	Cloudy with a Chance of Meatballs	Phil Lord and Christopher Miller
2009	Coraline	Henry Selick
2009	Fantastic Mr. Fox	Wes Anderson
2009	The Princess and the Frog	Ron Clements and John Musker

=== 2010s ===
Year	Winner	Director(s)
2010	Toy Story 3	Lee Unkrich
2010	Despicable Me	Pierre Coffin and Chris Renaud
2010	How to Train Your Dragon	Chris Sanders and Dean DeBlois
2010	The Illusionist	Sylvain Chomet
2010	Tangled	Nathan Greno and Byron Howard
2011	Rango	Gore Verbinski
2011	The Adventures of Tintin	Steven Spielberg
2011	Arthur Christmas	Sarah Smith
2011	Kung Fu Panda 2	Jennifer Yuh Nelson
2011	Puss in Boots	Chris Miller
2012	Wreck-It Ralph	Rich Moore
2012	Brave	Mark Andrews and Brenda Chapman
2012	Frankenweenie	Tim Burton
2012	Madagascar 3: Europe's Most Wanted	Eric Darnell, Tom McGrath, and Conrad Vernon
2012	ParaNorman	Chris Butler and Sam Fell
2012	Rise of the Guardians	Peter Ramsey
2013	Frozen	Chris Buck and Jennifer Lee
2013	The Croods	Kirk DeMicco and Chris Sanders
2013	Despicable Me 2	Pierre Coffin and Chris Renaud
2013	Monsters University	Dan Scanlon
2013	The Wind Rises	Hayao Miyazaki
2014	The Lego Movie	Phil Lord and Christopher Miller
2014	Big Hero 6	Don Hall and Chris Williams
2014	The Book of Life	Jorge Gutierrez
2014	The Boxtrolls	Graham Annable and Anthony Stacchi
2014	How to Train Your Dragon 2	Dean DeBlois
2015	Inside Out	Pete Docter and Ronnie del Carmen
2015	Anomalisa	Charlie Kaufman and Duke Johnson
2015	The Good Dinosaur	Peter Sohn
2015	The Peanuts Movie	Steve Martino
2015	Shaun the Sheep Movie	Richard Starzak and Mark Burton
2016	Zootopia	Byron Howard, Rich Moore and Jared Bush
2016	Finding Dory	Andrew Stanton
2016	Kubo and the Two Strings	Travis Knight
2016	Moana	Ron Clements and John Musker
2016	The Red Turtle	Michaël Dudok de Wit
2016	Trolls	Mike Mitchell and Walt Dohrn
2017	Coco	Lee Unkrich
2017	The Breadwinner	Nora Twomey
2017	Despicable Me 3	Pierre Coffin, Kyle Balda and Eric Guillon
2017	The Lego Batman Movie	Chris McKay
2017	Loving Vincent	Dorota Kobiela and Hugh Welchman
2018	Spider-Man: Into the Spider-Verse	Bob Persichetti, Peter Ramsey and Rodney Rothman
2018	The Grinch	Scott Mosier and Yarrow Cheney
2018	Incredibles 2	Brad Bird
2018	Isle of Dogs	Wes Anderson
2018	Mirai	Mamoru Hosoda
2018	Ralph Breaks the Internet	Rich Moore and Phil Johnston
2019	Toy Story 4	Josh Cooley
2019	Abominable	Jill Culton
2019	Frozen 2	Chris Buck and Jennifer Lee
2019	How to Train Your Dragon: The Hidden World	Dean DeBlois
2019	I Lost My Body	Jérémy Clapin
2019	Missing Link	Chris Butler

=== 2020s ===
Year	Winner	Director(s)
2020	Soul	Pete Docter
2020	Onward	Dan Scanlon
2020	Over the Moon	Glen Keane
2020	A Shaun the Sheep Movie: Farmageddon	Richard Phelan and Will Becher
2020	The Willoughbys	Kris Pearn
2020	Wolfwalkers	Tomm Moore and Ross Stewart
2021	The Mitchells vs. the Machines	Mike Rianda
2021	Flee	Jonas Poher Rasmussen
2021	Luca	Enrico Casarosa
2021	Encanto	Jared Bush and Byron Howard
2021	Raya and the Last Dragon	Don Hall and Carlos López Estrada
2022	Guillermo del Toro's Pinocchio	Guillermo del Toro and Mark Gustafson
2022	Marcel the Shell with Shoes On	Dean Fleischer Camp
2022	Puss in Boots: The Last Wish	Joel Crawford
2022	Turning Red	Domee Shi
2022	Wendell & Wild	Henry Selick
2023	Spider-Man: Across the Spider-Verse	Joaquim Dos Santos, Kemp Powers and Justin K. Thompson
2023	The Boy and the Heron	Hayao Miyazaki
2023	Elemental	Peter Sohn
2023	Nimona	Nick Bruno and Troy Quane
2023	Teenage Mutant Ninja Turtles: Mutant Mayhem	Jeff Rowe
2023	Wish	Chris Buck and Fawn Veerasunthorn
2024	The Wild Robot	Chris Sanders
2024	Flow	Gints Zilbalodis
2024	Inside Out 2	Kelsey Mann
2024	Memoir of a Snail	Adam Elliot
2024	Wallace & Gromit: Vengeance Most Fowl	Nick Park and Merlin Crossingham
2025	KPop Demon Hunters	Maggie Kang and Chris Appelhans
2025	Arco	Ugo Bienvenu
2025	Elio	Madeline Sharafian, Domee Shi and Adrian Molina
2025	In Your Dreams	Alex Woo
2025	Little Amélie or the Character of Rain	Maïlys Vallade and Liane-Cho Han
2025	Zootopia 2	Jared Bush and Byron Howard

== See also ==
- Academy Award for Best Animated Feature
- Annie Award for Best Animated Feature
- Annie Award for Best Animated Feature — Independent
- BAFTA Award for Best Animated Film
- Golden Globe Award for Best Animated Feature Film
