= Chicago Film Critics Association Award for Best Animated Film =

Annual US film award

The Chicago Film Critics Association Award for Best Animated Feature is one of the annual film awards by the Chicago Film Critics Association since 2007. Toy Story is the only franchise with multiple wins, winning two times for Toy Story 3 (2010) and Toy Story 4 (2019).

== Winners ==
=== 2000s ===
| Year | Winner | Director(s) |
|---|---|---|
| 2007 | Ratatouille | Brad Bird |
| 2007 | Beowulf | Robert Zemeckis |
| 2007 | Meet the Robinsons | Steve Anderson |
| 2007 | Persepolis | Vincent Paronnaud and Marjane Satrapi |
| 2007 | The Simpsons Movie | David Silverman |
| 2008 | WALL-E | Andrew Stanton |
| 2008 | Bolt | Byron Howard and Chris Williams |
| 2008 | Kung Fu Panda | Mark Osborne and John Stevenson |
| 2008 | The Tale of Despereaux | Sam Fell and Robert Stevenhagen |
| 2008 | Waltz with Bashir (Vals im Bashir) | Ari Folman |
| 2009 | Up | Pete Docter |
| 2009 | Coraline | Henry Selick |
| 2009 | Fantastic Mr. Fox | Wes Anderson |
| 2009 | Ponyo | Hayao Miyazaki |
| 2009 | The Princess and the Frog | Ron Clements and John Musker |

=== 2010s ===
| Year | Winner | Director(s) |
|---|---|---|
| 2010 | Toy Story 3 | Lee Unkrich |
| 2010 | Despicable Me | Chris Renaud and Pierre Coffin |
| 2010 | How To Train Your Dragon | Chris Sanders and Dean DeBlois |
| 2010 | The Illusionist | Sylvain Chomet |
| 2010 | Tangled | Nathan Greno and Byron Howard |
| 2011 | Rango | Gore Verbinski |
| 2011 | The Adventures of Tintin: The Secret of the Unicorn | Steven Spielberg |
| 2011 | Arthur Christmas | Sarah Smith |
| 2011 | Puss in Boots | Chris Miller |
| 2011 | Winnie the Pooh | Stephen Anderson and Don Hall |
| 2012 | ParaNorman | Sam Fell and Chris Butler |
| 2012 | Brave | Mark Andrews and Brenda Chapman |
| 2012 | Frankenweenie | Tim Burton |
| 2012 | The Secret World of Arrietty | Hiromasa Yonebayashi |
| 2012 | Wreck-It Ralph | Rich Moore |
| 2013 | The Wind Rises | Hayao Miyazaki |
| 2013 | The Croods | Kirk DeMicco and Chris Sanders |
| 2013 | From Up on Poppy Hill | Gorō Miyazaki |
| 2013 | Frozen | Chris Buck and Jennifer Lee |
| 2013 | Monsters University | Dan Scanlon |
| 2014 | The Lego Movie | Phil Lord and Christopher Miller |
| 2014 | Big Hero 6 | Don Hall and Chris Williams |
| 2014 | The Boxtrolls | Graham Annable and Anthony Stacchi |
| 2014 | How to Train Your Dragon 2 | Dean DeBlois |
| 2014 | The Tale of the Princess Kaguya | Isao Takahata |
| 2015 | Inside Out | Pete Docter and Ronnie del Carmen |
| 2015 | Anomalisa | Charlie Kaufman and Duke Johnson |
| 2015 | The Good Dinosaur | Peter Sohn |
| 2015 | The Peanuts Movie | Steve Martino |
| 2015 | Shaun the Sheep Movie | Richard Starzak and Mark Burton |
| 2016 | Kubo and the Two Strings | Travis Knight |
| 2016 | Moana | Ron Clements and John Musker |
| 2016 | The Red Turtle | Michaël Dudok de Wit |
| 2016 | Tower | Keith Maitland |
| 2016 | Zootopia | Byron Howard and Rich Moore |
| 2017 | Coco | Lee Unkrich |
| 2017 | The Breadwinner | Nora Twomey |
| 2017 | The Lego Batman Movie | Chris McKay |
| 2017 | Loving Vincent | Dorota Kobiela and Hugh Welchman |
| 2017 | Your Name | Makoto Shinkai |
| 2018 | Spider-Man: Into the Spider-Verse | Bob Persichetti, Peter Ramsey and Rodney Rothman |
| 2018 | Incredibles 2 | Brad Bird |
| 2018 | Isle of Dogs | Wes Anderson |
| 2018 | Ralph Breaks the Internet | Rich Moore & Phil Johnston |
| 2018 | Ruben Brandt, Collector | Milorad Krstić |
| 2019 | Toy Story 4 | Josh Cooley |
| 2019 | Frozen 2 | Chris Buck and Jennifer Lee |
| 2019 | How to Train Your Dragon: The Hidden World | Dean DeBlois |
| 2019 | I Lost My Body | Jérémy Clapin |
| 2019 | Missing Link | Chris Butler |

=== 2020s ===
| Year | Winner | Director(s) |
|---|---|---|
| 2020 | Wolfwalkers | Tomm Moore and Ross Stewart |
| 2020 | Onward | Dan Scanlon |
| 2020 | A Shaun the Sheep Movie: Farmageddon | Will Becher and Richard Phelan |
| 2020 | Soul | Pete Docter and Kemp Powers |
| 2020 | The Wolf House | Joaquín Cociña and Cristobal León |
| 2021 | Flee | Jonas Poher Rasmussen |
| 2021 | Belle | Mamoru Hosoda |
| 2021 | Encanto | Jared Bush and Byron Howard |
| 2021 | Luca | Enrico Casarosa |
| 2021 | The Mitchells vs. the Machines | Mike Rianda |
| 2022 | Guillermo del Toro's Pinocchio | Guillermo del Toro |
| 2022 | Apollo 10 1/2: A Space Age Childhood | Richard Linklater |
| 2022 | Mad God | Phil Tippett |
| 2022 | Marcel the Shell with Shoes On | Dean Fleischer Camp |
| 2022 | Turning Red | Domee Shi |
2023
| 2023 | The Boy and the Heron | Hayao Miyazaki |
| 2023 | Leo | Robert Marianetti, Robert Smigel, and David Wachtenheim |
| 2023 | Robot Dreams | Pablo Berger |
| 2023 | Spider-Man: Across the Spider-Verse | Joaquim Dos Santos, Kemp Powers, and Justin K. Thompson |
| 2023 | Teenage Mutant Ninja Turtles: Mutant Mayhem | Jeff Rowe |
2024
| 2024 | Flow | Gints Zilbalodis |
| 2024 | Inside Out 2 | Kelsey Mann |
| 2024 | Memoir of a Snail | Adam Elliot |
| 2024 | Wallace & Gromit: Vengeance Most Fowl | Nick Park and Merlin Crossingham |
| 2024 | The Wild Robot | Chris Sanders |
2025
| 2025 | KPop Demon Hunters | Maggie Kang and Chris Appelhans |
| 2025 | Arco | Ugo Bienvenu |
| 2025 | Boys Go to Jupiter | Julian Glander |
| 2025 | Little Amélie or the Character of Rain | Maïlys Vallade and Liane-Cho Han |
| 2025 | Zootopia 2 | Jared Bush and Byron Howard |

== See also ==
- Academy Award for Best Animated Feature
- Golden Globe Award for Best Animated Feature Film
