= Bob Persichetti =

American filmmaker and animator

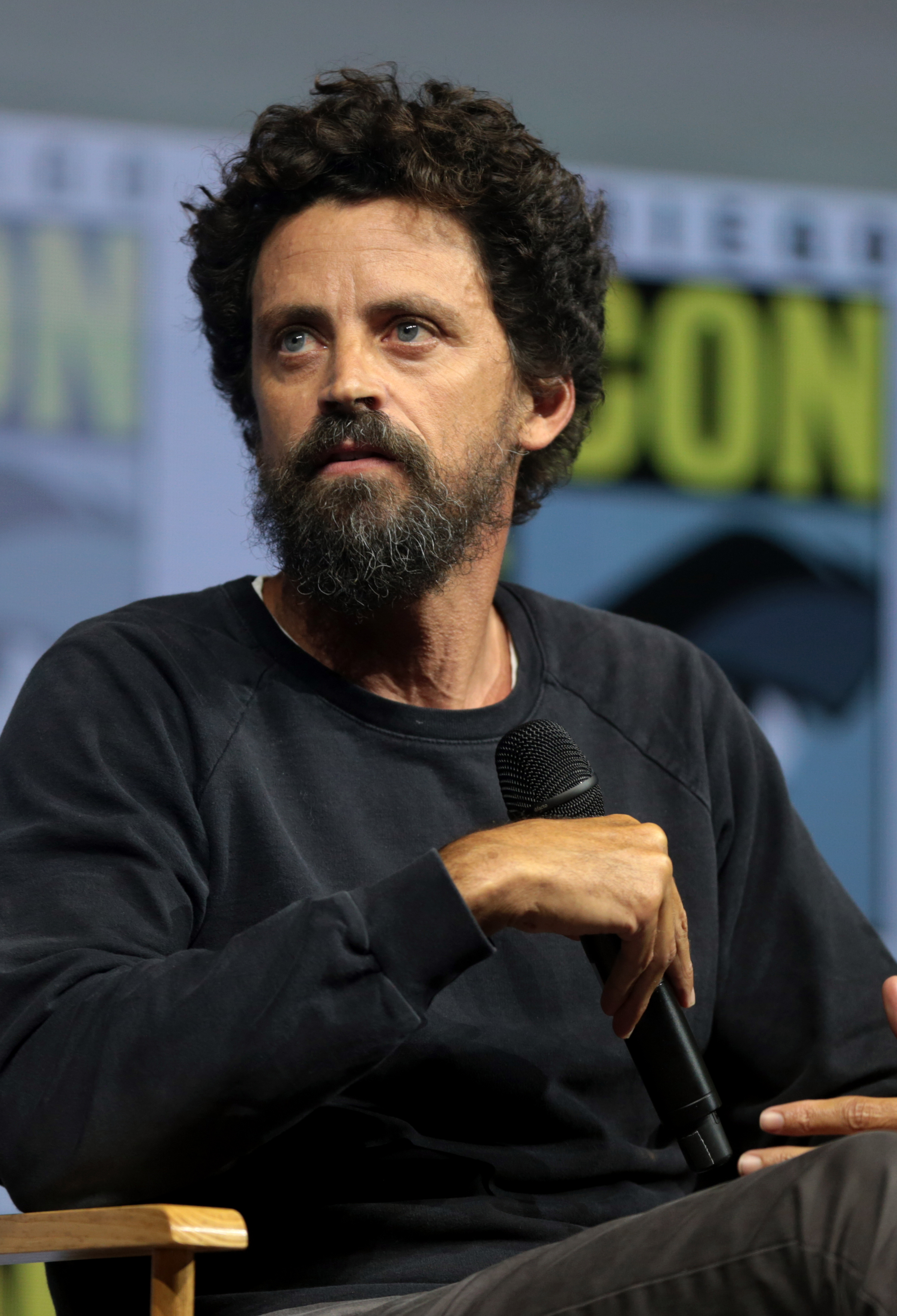
- Persichetti at the 2018 San Diego Comic-Con
- Born: Robert Persichetti Jr. September 28, 1970 (age 55); Los Angeles County, California
- Education: California Institute of the Arts
- Occupations: Filmmaker; animator; storyboard artist
- Years active: 1997–present

Robert Persichetti Jr. (born September 28, 1970) is an American filmmaker, animator, and storyboard artist. He is best known for co-directing the film Spider-Man: Into the Spider-Verse, for which he won the Academy Award for Best Animated Feature.

== Career ==
In November 2014, Persichetti was announced to be developing a film based on the Playmobil toys, and in September 2015 plans by French studio Wild Bunch were announced for him to make his feature directorial debut with the film, though this fell apart with them as he was trying to make a pitch to Sony. As the project with Playmobil played out, in December 2015, Persichetti joined the production of Spider-Man: Into the Spider-Verse. Kristine Belson, the head of Sony Pictures Animation, reached out to him, and he joined after reading a 40-page script treatment. This served as Persichetti's introduction to Phil Lord and Christopher Miller, and at that point Lord had a "loose first act" he was working on, with a full draft coming to fruition over the next six months while storyboarding and film reels were being worked on simultaneously. Peter Ramsey, with whom Persichetti had worked with frequently before, joined as a co-director at the end of 2016, and they were joined by Rodney Rothman by December 2017.

In February 2019, Persichetti was set to direct Puss in Boots: The Last Wish, but was replaced by Joel Crawford by March 2021.

Persichetti produced The Tiger's Apprentice (2024), directed by Raman Hui and co-directed by Paul Watling and Yong Duk Jhun.

Persichetti returned to direct Spider-Man: Beyond the Spider-Verse alongside Across the Spider-Verse co-director Justin K. Thompson. Officially announced in the role in December 2024, Persichetti and Thompson had served in their capacities since production began.

== Filmography ==
Director

- Spider-Man: Into the Spider-Verse (2018) (with Peter Ramsey and Rodney Rothman)
- Spider-Man: Beyond the Spider-Verse (2027) (with Justin K. Thompson)

Executive producer

- Playmobil: The Movie (2019)
- Spider-Man: Across the Spider-Verse (2023)

Producer

- The Tiger's Apprentice (2024)

Writer

- The Little Prince (2015) (also head of story)

Head of story

- Puss in Boots (2011)

Storyboard artist

- Shrek 2 (2004)
- Wallace & Gromit: The Curse of the Were-Rabbit (2005)
- Flushed Away (2006)
- Shrek the Halls (2007)
- Monsters vs. Aliens (2009)

Inbetweener

- Hercules (1997)
- Mulan (1998)
- Tarzan (1999)
- Fantasia 2000 (1999)
- The Emperor's New Groove (2000)
- Atlantis: The Lost Empire (2001)
- Treasure Planet (2002)

== Accolades ==
Award	Date of ceremony	Category	Title	Result	Ref.
Academy Awards	February 24, 2019	Best Animated Feature	Spider-Man: Into the Spider-Verse	Won	
Alliance of Women Film Journalists	January 10, 2019	Best Animated Feature Film	Spider-Man: Into the Spider-Verse	Won	
Annie Awards	February 4, 2006	Outstanding Achievement for Storyboarding in a Feature Production	Wallace & Gromit: The Curse of the Were-Rabbit	Won	
Annie Awards	February 2, 2019	Outstanding Achievement for Directing in an Animated Feature Production	Spider-Man: Into the Spider-Verse	Won	
BAFTA Awards	February 10, 2019	Best Animated Film	Spider-Man: Into the Spider-Verse	Won	
Chicago Film Critics Association Awards	December 7, 2018	Best Animated Feature	Spider-Man: Into the Spider-Verse	Won	
Critics' Choice Movie Awards	January 13, 2019	Best Animated Feature	Spider-Man: Into the Spider-Verse	Won	
Golden Globe Awards	January 6, 2019	Best Animated Feature Film	Spider-Man: Into the Spider-Verse	Won	
Hugo Awards	August 18, 2019	Best Dramatic Presentation, Long Form	Spider-Man: Into the Spider-Verse	Won	
Washington D.C. Area Film Critics Association Awards	December 3, 2018	Best Animated Feature	Spider-Man: Into the Spider-Verse	Nominated	
