= 46th Annie Awards =

US media awards ceremony held in 2019

- Date: February 2, 2019
- Site: Royce Hall; Los Angeles, California, U.S.
- Hosted by: Daran Norris
- Organized by: ASIFA-Hollywood

Highlights
- Best Animated Feature: Spider-Man: Into the Spider-Verse
- Best Direction: Bob Persichetti, Peter Ramsey, and Rodney Rothman; Spider-Man: Into the Spider-Verse
- Most awards: Spider-Man: Into the Spider-Verse (7)
- Most nominations: Incredibles 2 (11)

The 46th Annual Annie Awards honoring excellence in the field of animation of 2018 took place on February 2, 2019, at the University of California, Los Angeles's Royce Hall in Los Angeles, California, and presented awards in 32 categories.

== Production categories ==
On December 3, 2018, the nominations were announced. Incredibles 2 earned the most number of nominations with 11, followed by Ralph Breaks the Internet with 10.

Best Animated Feature	Best Animated Feature — Independent
Spider-Man: Into the Spider-Verse — Sony Pictures Animation; Early Man — Aardman Animations; Incredibles 2 — Pixar Animation Studios; Isle of Dogs — Fox Searchlight Pictures, Indian Paintbrush, American Empirical Pictures; Ralph Breaks the Internet — Walt Disney Animation Studios	Mirai — Studio Chizu; Ce Magnifique Gâteau! — Beast Animation, Vivement Lundi!, Pedri Animation; MFKZ — Ankama, Studio 4 °C; Ruben Brandt, Collector — Hungarian National Film Fund; Tito and the Birds — Bits Productions, Split Studio
Best Animated Special Production	Best Animated Short Subject
Mary Poppins Returns — Walt Disney Studios; Back to the Moon — Google Spotlight Stories, Google Doodles, Nexus Studios; The Emperor's Newest Clothes — HBO, Starburns Industries; The Highway Rat — Magic Light Pictures	Weekends — past lives productions; Grandpa Walrus — Caïmans Productions; Lost & Found — Wabi Sabi Studios; SOLAR WALK — Nørlum; Untravel — Production: Film House Baš Čelik, Serbia Coproduction: BFilm, Bratislava, Your Dreams Factory, Bratislava
Best Animated Television/Broadcast Commercial	Best Animated Television/Broadcast Production for Preschool Children
Greenpeace 'There's a Rang-Tan In My Bedroom' — Passion Animation Studios; Goldfish at the Fair — Stoopid Buddy Stoodios; Grinch / 40 / Olympics Spot — Illumination; JD.com, 'Joy and Heron' — Passion Pictures; The Fearless Are Here — Nexus Studio	Ask the StoryBots — Episode: How Do Computers Work? — JibJab Bros. Studios for Netflix; Dinotrux: Supercharged — Episode: Crabcavator — DreamWorks Animation Television; Hey Duggee — Episode: The Singing Badge — Studio AKA; PJ Masks — Episode: Wacky Floats — Frog Box Entertainment One; Tumble Leaf — Episode: Moonlight Mermaid/Hedge's Hatchlings — Amazon Studios and Bix Pix Entertainment; Sesame Street — Episode: Kitty Kindness — Sesame Workshop
Best Animated Television/Broadcast Production for Children	Best General Audience Animated Television/Broadcast Production
Hilda — Episode: Chapter 1: The Hidden People — Hilda Productions Limited, a Silvergate Media Company, Netflix Inc. and Mercury Filmworks; Kung Fu Panda: The Paws of Destiny — Episode: Enter the Dragon Master — DreamWorks Animation Television; Little Big Awesome — Episode: Puppy Shower — Amazon Studios; Rise of the Teenage Mutant Ninja Turtles — Episode: Mystic Mayhem — Nickelodeon Animation Studio; Tales of Arcadia: Trollhunters — Episode: The Eternal Knight Pt. 2 — DreamWorks Animation Television; SpongeBob SquarePants — Episode: Squirrel Jelly — Nickelodeon Animation Studio	BoJack Horseman — Episode: The Dog Days are Over — Tornante Productions, LLC for Netflix; Big Mouth — Episode: The Planned Parenthood Show — Netflix; Bob's Burgers — Episode: The Bleakening, Parts 1 and 2 — 20th Century FOX Television/Bento Box Entertainment for FOX; Human Kind Of — Episode: Desperately Seeking Social Skills — Cartuna for Facebook Watch; The Venture Bros. — Episode: The Saphrax Protocol — Titmouse, Inc. for Adult Swim
Best Student Film	Best Virtual Reality Production
Best Friend — Nicholas Olivieri, Yi Shen, Juliana De Lucca, Varun Nair, David Feliu; A Blink of An Eye — Kiana Naghshineh; Facing It — Sam Gainsborough; Hors Piste — Léo Brunel, Loris Cavalier, Camille Jalabert, Oscar Mallet; Sister — Siqi Song	Crow: The Legend — Baobab Studios; Age of Sail — Google Spotlight Stories, Broad Reach Pictures; Battlescar —AtlasV; Mind Palace — Filmakademie Baden-Württemberg GmbH; Moss — Polyarc

== Individual achievement categories ==
Outstanding Achievement for Animated Effects in an Animated Television/Broadcast Production	Outstanding Achievement for Animated Effects in an Animated Production
David M.V. Jones, Vincent Chou, Clare Yang – Trollhunters: Tales of Arcadia – DreamWorks Animation Television; Zach Glynn, Shyh-Chyuan Huang, Michael Losure, K.C. Ong, Alex Timchenko – DreamWorks Theatre Presents Kung Fu Panda – DreamWorks Animation; Jeffrey Lai – Rise of the Teenage Mutant Ninja Turtles – Nickelodeon Animation Studio; Mike Spitzmiller, Steve Gallant, Iain Collins, Daniel Craven, Lynda Rollins – SuperMansion – Stoopid Buddy Stoodios; Philip Child, Nilesh Sardesai – Watership Down – 42 / Biscuit Entertainment with Netflix	Cesar Velazquez, Marie Tollec, Alexander Moaveni, Peter DeMund, Ian J. Coony – Ralph Breaks the Internet – Walt Disney Animation Studios; Howard Jones, Dave Alex Riddett, Grant Hewlett, Pat Andrew, Elena Vitanza Chiarani – Early Man – Aardman Animations; Patrick Witting, Kiel Gnebba, Spencer Lueders, Joe Pepper, Sam Rickles – Hotel Transylvania 3: Summer Vacation – Sony Pictures Animation; Greg Gladstone, Tolga Göktekin, Jason Johnston, Eric Lacroix, Krzysztof Rost – Incredibles 2 – Pixar; So Ishigaki, Graham Wiebe – Next Gen – Baozou with Alibaba Pictures Inc. in association with Tangent Animation for Netflix
Outstanding Achievement for Character Animation in an Animated Television / Broadcast Production	Outstanding Achievement for Character Animation in an Animated Feature Production
Scott Lewis – Hilda – Hilda Productions Limited, a Silvergate Media Company, Netflix Inc. and Mercury Filmworks; Sikand Srinivas – Age of Sail – Google Spotlight Stories, Broad Reach Pictures; Lucas Vigroux – Back to the Moon – Google Spotlight Stories, Google Doodles, Nexus Studios; Juliane Martin – Rapunzel's Tangled Adventure – Walt Disney Television Animation; Dan MacKenzie – Tumble Leaf – Amazon Studios and Bix Pix Entertainment	David Han – Spider-Man: Into the Spider-Verse – Sony Pictures Animation; Laurie Sitzia – Early Man – Aardman Animations; Lance Fite – Incredibles 2 – Pixar; Vitor Vilela – Ralph Breaks the Internet – Walt Disney Animation Studios; Jason Stalman – Isle of Dogs – Fox Searchlight Pictures, Indian Paintbrush, American Empirical Pictures
Outstanding Achievement for Character Animation in a Live Action Production	Outstanding Achievement for Character Animation in a Video Game
Chris Sauvé, James Baxter, Sandro Cleuzo – Mary Poppins Returns – Walt Disney Pictures; Paul Story, Sidney Kombo-Kintombo, Eteuati Tema, Jacob Luamanuvae-Su'a, Sam Sharplin – Avengers: Infinity War – Marvel Studios; Arslan Elver, Laurent Laban, Kayn Garcia, Claire Blustin, Marc-André Coulombe – Christopher Robin – Walt Disney Pictures; Pablo Grillo, Laurent Laban, Kyle Dunlevy, Stuart Ellis, Liam Russell – Paddington 2 – StudioCanal, Heyday Films, Marmalade Films Ltd; Richard Oey, Adrien Annesley, Allison Orr, Wei Liang Yap, Shan Hao – The Nutcracker and the Four Realms – Walt Disney Animation Studios	Adrian Miguel, Adrian Garcia, Adrian Miguel – GRIS – Nomada Studio; Erica Pinto, Mehdi Yssef, Bruno Velazquez – God of War – Santa Monica Studio; Bobby Coddington – Spider-Man – Insomniac Games; Richard Lico – Moss – Polyarc; David Hubert, Jacob Gardner, Giovanni Spinelli, Marco Foglia, Jean-Philippe Chaurette – Shadow of the Tomb Raider – Square Enix
Outstanding Achievement for Character Design in an Animated Television / Broadcast Production	Outstanding Achievement for Character Design in an Animated Feature Production
Amanda Jolly – Rapunzel's Tangled Adventure – Disney Television Animation; Bruno Mangyoku – Age of Sail – Google Spotlight Stories, Broad Reach Pictures; Jim Bryson – Niko and the Sword of Light – Amazon Studios; Chris Mitchell – The Adventures of Rocky and Bullwinkle – DreamWorks Animation Television; Keiko Murayama – The Adventures of Rocky and Bullwinkle – DreamWorks Animation Television	Shiyoon Kim – Spider-Man: Into the Spider-Verse – Sony Pictures Animation; Matt Nolte – Incredibles 2 – Pixar; James Woods – Mary Poppins Returns – Walt Disney Studios; Marceline Tanguay – Next Gen – Baozou with Alibaba Pictures Inc. in association with Tangent Animation for Netflix; Ami Thompson – Ralph Breaks the Internet – Walt Disney Animation Studios
Outstanding Achievement for Directing in an Animated Television / Broadcast Production	Outstanding Achievement for Directing in an Animated Feature Production
Eddie Trigueros – Mickey Mouse – Walt Disney Television Animation; Evan Spiridellis – Ask the StoryBots – JibJab Bros. Studios for Netflix; Sung Jin Ahn – Niko and the Sword of Light – Amazon Studios; Nick Simotas – SuperMansion – Stoopid Buddy Stoodios; Guillermo del Toro, Rodrigo Blaas – 3Below: Tales of Arcadia – DreamWorks Animation Television	Bob Persichetti, Rodney Rothman, Peter Ramsey – Spider-Man: Into the Spider-Verse – Sony Pictures Animation; Nick Park – Early Man – Aardman Animations; Genndy Tartakovsky – Hotel Transylvania 3: Summer Vacation – Sony Pictures Animation; Brad Bird – Incredibles 2 – Pixar; Rich Moore, Phil Johnston – Ralph Breaks the Internet – Walt Disney Animation Studios
Outstanding Achievement for Music in an Animated Television / Broadcast Production	Outstanding Achievement for Music in an Animated Feature Production
Christopher Willis – Mickey Mouse – Walt Disney Television Animation; Mathieu Alvado – Back to the Moon – Google Spotlight Stories, Google Doodles, Nexus Studios; Tony Morales, John Kavanaugh, Craig Gerber, Silvia Olivas, Rachel Ruderman – Elena of Avalor – Walt Disney Television Animation; Alan Menken, Glenn Slater, Kevin Kliesch – Tangled: The Series – Walt Disney Television Animation; Vivek Maddala – The Tom and Jerry Show – Warner Bros. Animation	Michael Giacchino – Incredibles 2 – Pixar; Danny Elfman, Tyler, The Creator – The Grinch – Illumination; Harry Gregson-Williams, Tom Howe – Early Man – Aardman Animations; Henry Jackman, Alan Menken, Phil Johnston, Tom MacDougall, Dan Reynolds – Ralph Breaks the Internet – Walt Disney Animation Studios; Michael Herrera – Smallfoot – Warner Bros. Pictures, Warner Animation Group
Outstanding Achievement for Production Design in an Animated Television / Broadcast Production	Outstanding Achievement for Production Design in an Animated Feature Production
Céline Desrumaux, Jasmin Lai – Age of Sail – Google Spotlight Stories, Broad Reach Pictures; Justin Martin – Mickey Mouse – Disney Television Animation; Antonio Canobbio: Art Director, Howard Chen: Background Layout, Ivan Louey: Background Layout Supervisor, Crystal Yoori Son: Background Paint – Little Big Awesome – Amazon Video; Antonio Canobbio: Art Director, Bobby Walker: Background Paint, Michelle Rhee: Background Layout, Richard Chang: Background Paint, Joseph Martinez: Background Layout – Niko and the Sword of Light – Amazon Video; Chris Mitchell, Chris Turnham, Tor Aunet, DanBob Thompson, Aaron Spurgeon – The Adventures of Rocky and Bullwinkle – DreamWorks Animation Television	Justin K. Thompson – Spider-Man: Into the Spider-Verse – Sony Pictures Animation; Matt Perry, Richard Edmunds – Early Man – Aardman Animations; Scott Wills – Hotel Transylvania 3: Summer Vacation – Sony Pictures Animation; Adam Stockhausen, Paul Harrod – Isle of Dogs – Fox Searchlight Pictures, Indian Paintbrush, American Empirical Pictures; Jeff Turley – Mary Poppins Returns – Walt Disney Studios
Outstanding Achievement for Storyboarding in an Animated Television / Broadcast Production	Outstanding Achievement for Storyboarding in an Animated Feature Production
Alonso Ramirez Ramos – Mickey Mouse – Disney Television Animation (TIE); Kevin Molina-Ortiz – Rise of the Teenage Mutant Ninja Turtles – Nickelodeon Animation Studio (TIE); Will Patrick – Ben 10 – Cartoon Network Studios; Trey Buongiorno – Big Hero 6: The Series – Walt Disney Television Animation; Sage Cotugno (Note: Nominated as Sabrina Cotugno; Cotugno is non-binary and announced their name change in 2023.) – Star vs. the Forces of Evil – Walt Disney Television Animation	Dean Kelly – Incredibles 2 – Pixar; Habib Louati – The Grinch – Illumination; Bobby Alcid Rubio – Incredibles 2 – Pixar; Ovi Nedelcu – Mary Poppins Returns – Walt Disney Studios; Michael Herrera – Ralph Breaks the Internet – Walt Disney Animation Studios
Outstanding Achievement for Voice Acting in an Animated Television / Broadcast Production	Outstanding Achievement for Voice Acting in an Animated Feature Production
Will Arnett –as "BoJack Horseman"– BoJack Horseman – Tornante Productions, LLC for Netflix; Debi Derryberry –as "Maureen Murphy/Bridget/Phillip/Kenny/Scott/Nurse"– F is for Family – Wild West Television in association with Gaumont Television for Netflix; Juliet Donenfeld –as "Sally Squirrel"– Pete the Cat – Amazon Studios, Alcon Television Group, LLC; Patrick Warburton –as "Flynn"– Skylanders Academy – Activision Blizzard Studios; Tara Strong –as "Princess Unikitty"– Unikitty! – Warner Bros. Animation	Bryan Cranston –as "Chief"– Isle of Dogs – Fox Searchlight Pictures, Indian Paintbrush, American Empirical Pictures; Eddie Redmayne –as "Dug"– Early Man – Aardman Animations; Holly Hunter –as "Helen Parr/Elastigirl"– Incredibles 2 – Pixar; Charlyne Yi –as "Mai Su"– Next Gen – Baozou with Alibaba Pictures Inc. in association with Tangent Animation for Netflix; Sarah Silverman –as "Vanellope Von Schweetz "– Ralph Breaks the Internet – Walt Disney Animation Studios
Outstanding Achievement for Writing in an Animated Television / Broadcast Production	Outstanding Achievement for Writing in an Animated Feature Production
Stephanie Simpson – Hilda – Hilda Productions Limited, a Silvergate Media Company, Netflix Inc. and Mercury Filmworks; Emily Altman – Big Mouth – Netflix; Matt Burnett, Ben Levin, Shauna McGarry, Jeff Trammell, Tiffany Ford – Craig of the Creek – Cartoon Network Studios; Dominic Bisignano, Aaron Hammersley, Amy Higgins, John Infantino, Daron Nefcy – Star vs. the Forces of Evil – Walt Disney Television Animation; Mikey Heller, Sang Yup Lee, Louie Zong – We Bare Bears – Cartoon Network Studios	Phil Lord, Rodney Rothman – Spider-Man: Into the Spider-Verse – Sony Pictures Animation; Brad Bird – Incredibles 2 – Pixar; Mamoru Hosoda, Stephanie Sheh – Mirai – Studio Chizu; Phil Johnston, Pamela Ribon – Ralph Breaks the Internet – Walt Disney Animation Studios; Michael Jelenic, Aaron Horvath – Teen Titans Go! To the Movies – Warner Bros. Animation
Outstanding Achievement for Editorial in an Animated Television / Broadcast Production	Outstanding Achievement for Editorial in an Animated Feature Production
Charles Jones, Joe Molinari, Dao Le, Vartan Nazarian, David Vazquez – Big Hero 6: The Series – Walt Disney Television Animation; Adam Rickabus – Puppy Dog Pals – Wild Canary Animation, Disney Junior; Estrella Miyakawa Capin, Christopher Hink, Bob Tomlin, Rick Dominicus – SpongeBob SquarePants – Nickelodeon Animation Studio; John Laus, Graham Fisher – 3Below: Tales of Arcadia – DreamWorks Animation Television; Steve Downs, John Wall, Adam Smith, Collin Erker – The Epic Tales of Captain Underpants – DreamWorks Animation Television	Bob Fisher, Andrew Leviton, Vivek Sharma – Spider-Man: Into the Spider-Verse – Sony Pictures Animation; Chris Cartagena – The Grinch – Illumination; Stephen Schaffer, ACE, Anthony J. Greenberg, Katie Schaefer Bishop – Incredibles 2 – Pixar; Jeremy Milton, Fabienne Rawley, Jesse Averna, John Wheeler, Pace Paulsen – Ralph Breaks the Internet – Walt Disney Animation Studios; Milorad Krstic, Marcell Laszlo, Laszlo Wimmer, Danijel Daka Milosevic – Ruben Brandt, Collector – Hungarian National Film Fund

== Multiple awards and nominations ==
=== Films ===
The following films received multiple nominations:

Nominations	Film
11	Incredibles 2
10	Ralph Breaks the Internet
7	Early Man
7	Spider-Man: Into the Spider-Verse
5	Mary Poppins Returns
4	The Grinch
4	Isle of Dogs
3	Hotel Transylvania 3: Summer Vacation
3	Next Gen
2	Mirai

The following films received multiple awards:

Wins	Film
7	Spider-Man: Into the Spider-Verse
2	Incredibles 2
2	Mary Poppins Returns

=== Television/Broadcast ===
The following television productions received multiple nominations:

Nominations	Show
4	Mickey Mouse
3	The Adventures of Rocky and Bullwinkle
3	Hilda
3	Niko and the Sword of Light
3	Rapunzel's Tangled Adventure
3	Rise of the Teenage Mutant Ninja Turtles
2	3Below: Tales of Arcadia
2	Ask the StoryBots
2	Big Hero 6: The Series
2	Big Mouth
2	BoJack Horseman
2	Little Big Awesome
2	Star vs. the Forces of Evil
2	SuperMansion
2	Tumble Leaf
2	Trollhunters: Tales of Arcadia

The following television productions received multiple awards:

Wins	Show
3	Hilda
3	Mickey Mouse
2	BoJack Horseman
