= Annie Award for Outstanding Achievement for Directing in a Feature Production =

Annual US film award

Annie Award for Outstanding Achievement for Directing in an Animated Feature Production
- Awarded for: Excellence in direction for film animation
- Country: United States
- Presented by: ASIFA-Hollywood
- First award: 1996 (to John Lasseter for Toy Story)
- Currently held by: Maggie Kang and Chris Appelhans for KPop Demon Hunters (2025)
- Website: annieawards.org

The Annie Award for Outstanding Achievement for Directing in a Feature Production (or Annie Award for Outstanding Achievement for Directing in an Animated Feature Production) is an Annie Award, awarded annually to the best animated feature film and introduced in 1996. It rewards directing for animated feature films. The recipients are directors as well as co-directors.

== History ==
The award was formerly called Best Individual Achievement: Directing in 1996, Best Individual Achievement: Directing in a Feature Production in 1997, and Outstanding Individual Achievement for Directing in an Animated Feature Production from 1998 to 2001.

== Multiple winners and nominations ==
The award has matched up with the Academy Award for Best Animated Feature every year except for 1997, 2006, 2011 and 2020. It has been awarded 26 times. Pete Docter, Rich Moore, John Lasseter and Dean DeBlois have won it twice, and Brad Bird and Lee Unkrich hold a record of three wins.

Jeff Rowe, Mamoru Oshii, Nora Twomey, Ron Clements, Tim Johnson, Ash Brannon, Phil Lord and Christopher Miller, David Silverman, Chris Wedge, Carlos Saldanha, Mark Dindal, John Musker, Sylvain Chomet, Andrew Adamson, Kelly Asbury, Sam Fell, Mamoru Hosoda, Don Hall, Tomm Moore, Genndy Tartakovsky, Chris Butler, Jennifer Lee, Benjamin Renner, Chris McKay, Byron Howard, and Makoto Shinkai have received two nominations each. Andrew Stanton, Chris Sanders, Dean DeBlois, Nick Park, Henry Selick and Rich Moore have received three nominations. John Lasseter, Chris Buck and Pete Docter, were nominated four times. Hayao Miyazaki, and Lee Unkrich both hold a record five nominations.

== Winners and nominees ==
=== 1990s ===
| Year | Film/TV | Winners and nominees |
1996 (24th)
| 1996 (24th) | Toy Story | John Lasseter |
| 1996 (24th) | Gargoyles | Frank Paur |
| 1996 (24th) | Ghost in the Shell | Mamoru Oshii |
| 1996 (24th) | The Hunchback of Notre Dame | Gary Trousdale and Kirk Wise |
| 1996 (24th) | James and the Giant Peach | Henry Selick |
1997 (25th)
| 1997 (25th) | Hercules | Ron Clements and John Musker |
| 1997 (25th) | Cats Don't Dance | Mark Dindal |
| 1997 (25th) | Space Jam | Bruce W. Smith and Tony Cervone |
1998 (26th)
| 1998 (26th) | Mulan | Tony Bancroft and Barry Cook |
| 1998 (26th) | Anastasia | Don Bluth and Gary Goldman |
| 1998 (26th) | Pooh's Grand Adventure: The Search for Christopher Robin | Karl Geurs |
| 1998 (26th) | Beauty and the Beast: The Enchanted Christmas | Andy Knight |
1999 (27th)
| 1999 (27th) | The Iron Giant | Brad Bird |
| 1999 (27th) | Tarzan | Chris Buck and Kevin Lima |
| 1999 (27th) | The Prince of Egypt | Brenda Chapman, Steve Hickner and Simon Wells |
| 1999 (27th) | Antz | Eric Darnell and Tim Johnson |
| 1999 (27th) | A Bug's Life | John Lasseter and Andrew Stanton |

=== 2000s ===
| Year | Film | Winners and nominees |
2000 (28th)
| 2000 (28th) | Toy Story 2 | John Lasseter, Ash Brannon and Lee Unkrich |
| 2000 (28th) | The Tigger Movie | Jun Falkenstein |
| 2000 (28th) | Princess Mononoke | Hayao Miyazaki |
| 2000 (28th) | Dinosaur | Eric Leighton and Ralph Zondag |
| 2000 (28th) | Chicken Run | Peter Lord and Nick Park |
2001 (29th)
| 2001 (29th) | Shrek | Andrew Adamson and Vicky Jenson |
| 2001 (29th) | The Emperor's New Groove | Mark Dindal |
| 2001 (29th) | Batman Beyond: Return of the Joker | Curt Geda |
| 2001 (29th) | Lady and the Tramp II: Scamp's Adventure | Darrell Rooney and Jeannine Roussel |
2002 (30th)
| 2002 (30th) | Spirited Away | Hayao Miyazaki |
| 2002 (30th) | Treasure Planet | Ron Clements and John Musker |
| 2002 (30th) | Monsters, Inc. | Pete Docter, Lee Unkrich and David Silverman |
| 2002 (30th) | Lilo & Stitch | Chris Sanders and Dean DeBlois |
| 2002 (30th) | Ice Age | Chris Wedge and Carlos Saldanha |
2003 (31st)
| 2003 (31st) | Finding Nemo | Andrew Stanton and Lee Unkrich |
| 2003 (31st) | The Triplets of Belleville | Sylvain Chomet |
| 2003 (31st) | Looney Tunes: Back in Action | Eric Goldberg |
| 2003 (31st) | Millennium Actress | Satoshi Kon |
2004 (32nd)
| 2004 (32nd) | The Incredibles | Brad Bird |
| 2004 (32nd) | Shrek 2 | Andrew Adamson, Kelly Asbury and Conrad Vernon |
| 2004 (32nd) | Home on the Range | Will Finn and John Sanford |
| 2004 (32nd) | The SpongeBob SquarePants Movie | Stephen Hillenburg |
| 2004 (32nd) | Ghost in the Shell 2: Innocence | Mamoru Oshii |
2005 (33rd)
| 2005 (33rd) | Wallace & Gromit: The Curse of the Were-Rabbit | Nick Park and Steve Box |
| 2005 (33rd) | Corpse Bride | Mike Johnson and Tim Burton |
| 2005 (33rd) | Howl's Moving Castle | Hayao Miyazaki |
2006 (34th)
| 2006 (34th) | Over the Hedge | Tim Johnson and Karey Kirkpatrick |
| 2006 (34th) | Flushed Away | David Bowers and Sam Fell |
| 2006 (34th) | Monster House | Gil Kenan |
| 2006 (34th) | Cars | John Lasseter |
| 2006 (34th) | Ice Age: The Meltdown | Carlos Saldanha |
2007 (35th)
| 2007 (35th) | Ratatouille | Brad Bird |
| 2007 (35th) | Surf's Up | Ash Brannon and Chris Buck |
| 2007 (35th) | Shrek the Third | Chris Miller and Raman Hui |
| 2007 (35th) | Persepolis | Vincent Paronnaud and Marjane Satrapi |
| 2007 (35th) | The Simpsons Movie | David Silverman |
2008 (36th)
| 2008 (36th) | Kung Fu Panda | Mark Osborne and John Stevenson |
| 2008 (36th) | Waltz with Bashir | Ari Folman |
| 2008 (36th) | $9.99 | Tatia Rosenthal |
| 2008 (36th) | WALL-E | Andrew Stanton |
| 2008 (36th) | The Tale of Despereaux | Rob Stevenhagen and Sam Fell |
2009 (37th)
| 2009 (37th) | Up | Pete Docter |
| 2009 (37th) | Fantastic Mr. Fox | Wes Anderson |
| 2009 (37th) | Cloudy with a Chance of Meatballs | Phil Lord and Christopher Miller |
| 2009 (37th) | Ponyo | Hayao Miyazaki |
| 2009 (37th) | Coraline | Henry Selick |

=== 2010s ===
| Year | Film | Winners and nominees |
2010 (38th)
| 2010 (38th) | How to Train Your Dragon | Dean DeBlois and Chris Sanders |
| 2010 (38th) | The Illusionist | Sylvain Chomet |
| 2010 (38th) | Summer Wars | Mamoru Hosoda |
| 2010 (38th) | Despicable Me | Chris Renaud and Pierre Coffin |
| 2010 (38th) | Toy Story 3 | Lee Unkrich |
2011 (39th)
| 2011 (39th) | Kung Fu Panda 2 | Jennifer Yuh Nelson |
| 2011 (39th) | Gnomeo & Juliet | Kelly Asbury |
| 2011 (39th) | Winnie the Pooh | Stephen Anderson and Don Hall |
| 2011 (39th) | Puss in Boots | Chris Miller |
| 2011 (39th) | Rio | Carlos Saldanha |
| 2011 (39th) | Rango | Gore Verbinski |
2012 (40th)
| 2012 (40th) | Wreck-It Ralph | Rich Moore |
| 2012 (40th) | Hotel Transylvania | Genndy Tartakovsky |
| 2012 (40th) | The Rabbi's Cat | Joann Sfar and Antoine Delesvaux |
| 2012 (40th) | ParaNorman | Sam Fell and Chris Butler |
| 2012 (40th) | Zarafa | Rémi Bezançon and Jean-Christophe Lie |
2013 (41st)
| 2013 (41st) | Frozen | Chris Buck and Jennifer Lee |
| 2013 (41st) | The Croods | Kirk DeMicco and Chris Sanders |
| 2013 (41st) | Turbo | David Soren |
| 2013 (41st) | Epic | Chris Wedge |
| 2013 (41st) | Ernest & Celestine | Stéphane Aubier, Vincent Patar and Benjamin Renner |
2014 (42nd)
| 2014 (42nd) | How to Train Your Dragon 2 | Dean DeBlois |
| 2014 (42nd) | Big Hero 6 | Don Hall and Chris Williams |
| 2014 (42nd) | Cheatin' | Bill Plympton |
| 2014 (42nd) | Song of the Sea | Tomm Moore |
| 2014 (42nd) | The Book of Life | Jorge R. Gutierrez |
| 2014 (42nd) | The Boxtrolls | Anthony Stacchi and Graham Annable |
| 2014 (42nd) | The Lego Movie | Phil Lord and Christopher Miller and Chris McKay |
| 2014 (42nd) | The Tale of the Princess Kaguya | Isao Takahata |
2015 (43rd)
| 2015 (43rd) | Inside Out | Pete Docter |
| 2015 (43rd) | Anomalisa | Charlie Kaufman and Duke Johnson |
| 2015 (43rd) | Extraordinary Tales | Raul Garcia |
| 2015 (43rd) | The Prophet | Roger Allers |
| 2015 (43rd) | Shaun the Sheep Movie | Mark Burton and Richard Starzak |
| 2015 (43rd) | The Peanuts Movie | Steve Martino |
| 2015 (43rd) | Hotel Transylvania 2 | Genndy Tartakovsky |
| 2015 (43rd) | When Marnie Was There | Hiromasa Yonebayashi |
2016 (44th)
| 2016 (44th) | Zootopia | Byron Howard and Rich Moore |
| 2016 (44th) | Kubo and the Two Strings | Travis Knight |
| 2016 (44th) | My Life as a Zucchini | Claude Barras |
| 2016 (44th) | The Red Turtle | Michaël Dudok de Wit |
| 2016 (44th) | Your Name | Makoto Shinkai |
2017 (45th)
| 2017 (45th) | Coco | Lee Unkrich and Adrian Molina |
| 2017 (45th) | The Big Bad Fox and Other Tales... | Benjamin Renner and Patrick Imbert |
| 2017 (45th) | The Boss Baby | Tom McGrath |
| 2017 (45th) | The Breadwinner | Nora Twomey |
| 2017 (45th) | The Lego Batman Movie | Chris McKay |
2018 (46th)
| 2018 (46th) | Spider-Man: Into the Spider-Verse | Bob Persichetti, Peter Ramsey and Rodney Rothman |
| 2018 (46th) | Early Man | Nick Park |
| 2018 (46th) | Hotel Transylvania 3: Summer Vacation | Genndy Tartakovsky |
| 2018 (46th) | Incredibles 2 | Brad Bird |
| 2018 (46th) | Ralph Breaks the Internet | Phil Johnston and Rich Moore |
2019 (47th)
| 2019 (47th) | Klaus | Sergio Pablos |
| 2019 (47th) | Missing Link | Chris Butler |
| 2019 (47th) | I Lost My Body | Jérémy Clapin |
| 2019 (47th) | Frozen 2 | Jennifer Lee and Chris Buck |
| 2019 (47th) | Weathering with You | Makoto Shinkai |

=== 2020s ===
| Year | Film | Winners and nominees |
2020 (48th)
| 2020 (48th) | Wolfwalkers | Tomm Moore and Ross Stewart |
| 2020 (48th) | Calamity Jane | Rémi Chayé |
| 2020 (48th) | Over the Moon | Glen Keane |
| 2020 (48th) | Ride Your Wave | Masaaki Yuasa |
| 2020 (48th) | Soul | Pete Docter |
2021 (49th)
| 2021 (49th) | The Mitchells vs. the Machines | Mike Rianda and Jeff Rowe |
| 2021 (49th) | Belle | Mamoru Hosoda |
| 2021 (49th) | Encanto | Jared Bush, Byron Howard and Charise Castro Smith |
| 2021 (49th) | Flee | Jonas Poher Rasmussen and Kenneth Ladekjær |
| 2021 (49th) | Luca | Enrico Casarosa |
2022 (50th)
| 2022 (50th) | Guillermo del Toro's Pinocchio | Guillermo del Toro and Mark Gustafson |
| 2022 (50th) | Turning Red | Domee Shi |
| 2022 (50th) | Marcel the Shell with Shoes On | Dean Fleischer Camp, Kirsten Lepore and Stephen Chiodo |
| 2022 (50th) | My Father's Dragon | Nora Twomey |
| 2022 (50th) | Wendell & Wild | Henry Selick |
2023 (51st)
| 2023 (51st) | Spider-Man: Across the Spider-Verse | Joaquim Dos Santos, Kemp Powers and Justin K. Thompson |
| 2023 (51st) | The Boy and the Heron | Hayao Miyazaki |
| 2023 (51st) | Nimona | Nick Bruno and Troy Quane |
| 2023 (51st) | Robot Dreams | Pablo Berger and Benoît Feroumont |
| 2023 (51st) | Teenage Mutant Ninja Turtles: Mutant Mayhem | Jeff Rowe and Kyler Spears |
2024 (52nd)
| 2024 (52nd) | The Wild Robot | Chris Sanders |
| 2024 (52nd) | Chicken for Linda! | Chiara Malta and Sébastien Laudenbach |
| 2024 (52nd) | Flow | Gints Zilbalodis |
| 2024 (52nd) | That Christmas | Simon Otto |
| 2024 (52nd) | Wallace & Gromit: Vengeance Most Fowl | Nick Park and Merlin Crossingham |
2025 (53rd)
| 2025 (53rd) | KPop Demon Hunters | Maggie Kang and Chris Appelhans |
| 2025 (53rd) | Arco | Ugo Bienvenu, Adam Sillard and Anaëlle Saba |
| 2025 (53rd) | Chainsaw Man – The Movie: Reze Arc | Tatsuya Yoshihara |
| 2025 (53rd) | Little Amélie or the Character of Rain | Maïlys Vallade and Liane-Cho Han |
| 2025 (53rd) | Scarlet | Mamoru Hosoda |

== See also ==
- Academy Award for Best Animated Feature
- Golden Globe Award for Best Animated Feature Film
