= Justin K. Thompson =

American Film Director

- Occupations: Film director; production designer
- Years active: 1993–present
- Employers: Various (1993–1999); Cartoon Network (2000–2005); Sony Pictures Animation (2006–present)
- Notable work: Spider-Man: Across the Spider-Verse; Spider-Man: Beyond the Spider-Verse

Justin K. Thompson is an American film director and production designer. He is best known as the production designer for the animated film Spider-Man: Into the Spider-Verse (2018) and for co-directing its sequels Spider-Man: Across the Spider-Verse (2023) and Spider-Man: Beyond the Spider-Verse (2027).

== Career ==
By 1993, he began his career working on various projects at Disney Television Animation, DreamWorks Animation Television, and Film Roman. In 2000, Thompson transitioned to Cartoon Network, working as a production designer on The Powerpuff Girls (2002–04), Samurai Jack (2003–04), and Star Wars: Clone Wars (2003–05). In 2006, he moved to Sony Pictures Animation, where he served as a production designer on Cloudy with a Chance of Meatballs (2009), its 2013 sequel, The Angry Birds Movie (2016), Smurfs: The Lost Village (2017), The Emoji Movie (2017), and Spider-Man: Into the Spider-Verse (2018). In 2021, he made his directorial debut with Spider-Man: Across the Spider-Verse (2023) with Joaquim Dos Santos and Kemp Powers. In December 2024, it was reported that he would direct Spider-Man: Beyond the Spider-Verse (2027) alongside Bob Persichetti.

== Filmography ==
=== Feature films ===
Year	Title	Director	Production designer	Notes/Ref(s)
2009	Cloudy with a Chance of Meatballs	No	Yes	
2013	Cloudy with a Chance of Meatballs 2	No	Yes	
2016	The Angry Birds Movie	No	Yes	
2017	Smurfs: The Lost Village	No	Yes	
2017	The Emoji Movie	No	Yes	
2018	Spider-Man: Into the Spider-Verse	No	Yes	
2023	Spider-Man: Across the Spider-Verse	Yes	No	With Joaquim Dos Santos and Kemp Powers
2027	Spider-Man: Beyond the Spider-Verse †	Yes	No	With Bob Persichetti; In production

=== Television ===
Year	Title	Production designer	Other	Notes/Ref(s)
2002–04	The Powerpuff Girls	Yes	Yes	Story writer (4 episodes); Storyboard artist (21 episodes)
2003–04	Samurai Jack	Yes	Yes	Layout artist (2 episodes)
2003–05	Star Wars: Clone Wars	Yes	Yes	Background animation supervisor (25 episodes)

== Accolades ==
Award	Date of ceremony	Category	Film	Result	Ref.
Academy Awards	March 10, 2024	Best Animated Feature	Spider-Man: Across the Spider-Verse	Nominated	
Annie Awards	February 2, 2019	Outstanding Achievement for Production Design in an Animated Feature Production	Spider-Man: Into the Spider-Verse	Won	
Annie Awards	February 17, 2024	Outstanding Achievement for Directing in a Feature Production	Spider-Man: Across the Spider-Verse	Won	
Art Directors Guild Awards	February 2, 2019	Best Production Design in an Animated Film	Spider-Man: Into the Spider-Verse	Nominated	
British Academy Film Awards	February 18, 2024	Best Animated Film	Spider-Man: Across the Spider-Verse	Nominated	
Celebration of Cinema and Television	December 4, 2023	Animation Award	Spider-Man: Across the Spider-Verse	Won	
Chicago Film Critics Association Awards	December 12, 2023	Best Animated Film	Spider-Man: Across the Spider-Verse	Nominated	
Critics' Choice Movie Awards	January 14, 2024	Best Animated Feature	Spider-Man: Across the Spider-Verse	Won	
Golden Globe Awards	January 7, 2024	Best Animated Feature Film	Spider-Man: Across the Spider-Verse	Nominated	
Harvey Awards	October 12, 2023	Best Adaptation from Comic Book/Graphic Novel	Spider-Man: Across the Spider-Verse	Won	
Hollywood Critics Association Midseason Film Awards	June 30, 2023	Best Director	Spider-Man: Across the Spider-Verse	Won	
Online Film Critics Society Awards	January 22, 2024	Best Animated Film	Spider-Man: Across the Spider-Verse	Won	
Primetime Emmy Awards	September 18, 2005	Outstanding Individual Achievement in Animation	Star Wars Clone Wars: Vol. 2 (Chapters 21–25)	Won	
San Diego Film Critics Society Awards	December 19, 2023	Best Animated Film	Spider-Man: Across the Spider-Verse	Runner-up	
Satellite Awards	March 3, 2024	Best Animated or Mixed Media Feature	Spider-Man: Across the Spider-Verse	Nominated	
