= Peter Ramsey =

American illustrator, storyboard artist, and filmmaker (born 1962)

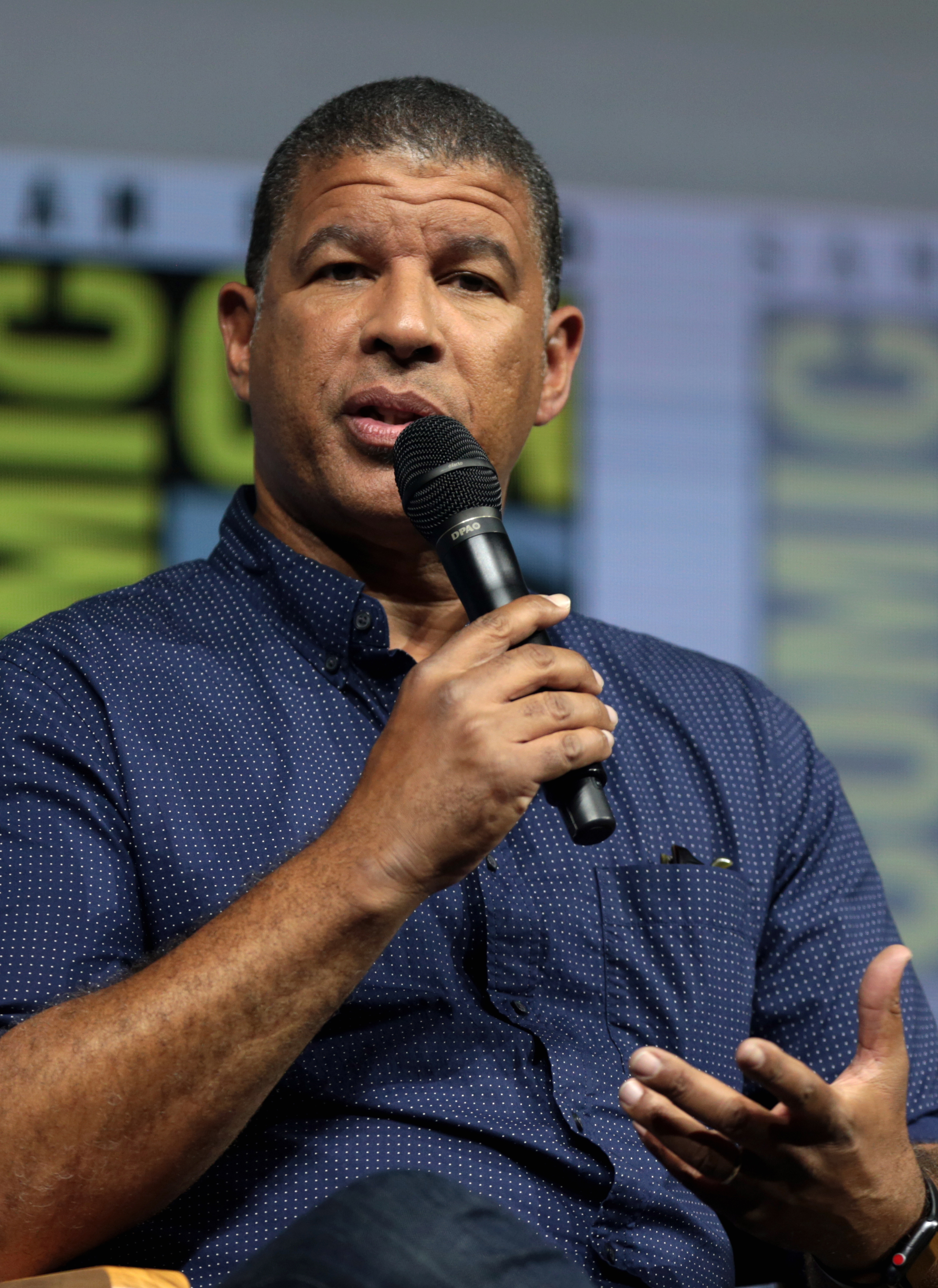
- Ramsey at the 2018 San Diego Comic-Con
- Born: Peter A. Ramsey; December 23, 1962 (age 63); Los Angeles, California, U.S.
- Education: University of California, Los Angeles; Los Angeles City College
- Occupations: Illustrator; storyboard artist; filmmaker
- Years active: 1988–present
- Known for: Rise of the Guardians; Spider-Man: Into the Spider-Verse

Peter A. Ramsey (born December 23, 1962) is an American illustrator, storyboard artist, and filmmaker. He is best known for directing DreamWorks Animation's Rise of the Guardians (2012), becoming the first African American to direct a computer-animated film and the second to direct a major American animated film (Bruce W. Smith was the first African-American director with Paramount Pictures' Bebe's Kids (1992)), and co-directing Sony Pictures Animation's Spider-Man: Into the Spider-Verse (2018). For Spider-Man: Into the Spider-Verse, he became the first African American to be nominated for and win an Academy Award for Best Animated Feature.

== Early life ==
Ramsey grew up in the Crenshaw District of South Los Angeles, and graduated in 1980 from Palisades High School. He studied painting at University of California, Los Angeles for two years before enrolling in film classes at Los Angeles City College. He was raised Catholic.

== Career ==
His first job in Hollywood was painting a mural, but soon he was working as a storyboard artist and production illustrator on 26 films including Predator 2, Backdraft, Independence Day, Fight Club and A.I. Artificial Intelligence. He was a second unit director for Poetic Justice, Higher Learning, Tank Girl and Godzilla. Aron Warner, the producer of Tank Girl, suggested he join DreamWorks Animation. After initially being uninterested, Ramsey joined DreamWorks as a story artist for Shrek the Third and Shrek the Halls.

In 2012, he directed Rise of the Guardians, based on William Joyce's The Guardians of Childhood books, making him the first African-American to direct a big-budget animated feature. In 2018, he co-directed Spider-Man: Into the Spider-Verse, which won the 2019 Academy Award for Best Animated Feature. In 2019, he was set to direct the Robert Johnson film Love in Vain. On April 16, 2021, he was set to direct the film adaptation of the Matthew Quick novel Boy21. In February 2022, he was hired to write and direct Blood Count, a period vampire thriller distributed by Paramount Pictures

In April 2022, Ramsey had been hired to direct an episode each of the Star Wars streaming series The Mandalorian season 3, which was released in March 2023, and Ahsoka, which was released in August 2023.

Ramsey is a member of AMPAS, the Directors Guild of America and The Animation Guild.

== Filmography ==
=== Director ===
Film

- Monsters vs. Aliens: Mutant Pumpkins from Outer Space (2009)
- Rise of the Guardians (2012)
- Spider-Man: Into the Spider-Verse (2018) (co-director with Bob Persichetti and Rodney Rothman)

Television

Year	Title	Notes
2021	We the People	Episode "Active Citizenship"
2022	Lost Ollie	Miniseries
2023	The Mandalorian	Episode "Chapter 21: The Pirate"
2023	Ahsoka	Episode "Part Four: Fallen Jedi"

=== Second unit director ===
Year	Title	Director
1993	Poetic Justice	John Singleton
1995	Higher Learning	John Singleton
1995	Tank Girl	Rachel Talalay
1998	Godzilla	Roland Emmerich
2026	The Mandalorian and Grogu	Jon Favreau

=== Storyboard artist ===
- A Nightmare on Elm Street 5: The Dream Child (1989)
- Predator 2 (1990)
- Tank Girl (1995)
- Mortal Kombat (1995)
- Eye for an Eye (1996)
- Independence Day (1996)
- Men in Black (1997)
- Godzilla (1998)
- Being John Malkovich (1999)
- Fight Club (1999)
- How the Grinch Stole Christmas (2000)
- Cast Away (2000)
- A.I. Artificial Intelligence (2001)
- The Affair of the Necklace (2001)
- Panic Room (2002)
- Minority Report (2002)
- Adaptation. (2002)
- The Core (2003)
- Spartan (2004)
- Shark Tale (2004) (additional)
- Shrek the Third (2007)
- Shrek the Halls (2007)
- Penguins of Madagascar (2014) (additional)
- Sausage Party (2016) (additional)
- Duck Duck Goose (2018) (additional)
- A Wrinkle in Time (2018)

=== Illustrator ===
- Backdraft (1991)
- Far and Away (1992)
- Bram Stoker's Dracula (1992)
- The Shadow (1994)
- Batman Forever (1995)
- EDtv (1999)

=== Other ===
- Almost an Angel (1990) (continuity artist)
- Monsters vs. Aliens (2009) (head of story)
- Puss in Boots (2011) (creative consultant)
- Spider-Man: Homecoming (2017) (head of story)

=== Executive producer ===
- Hair Love (2019)
- Lost Ollie (2022)
- Spider-Man: Across the Spider-Verse (2023)
- Kizazi Moto: Generation Fire (2023)
- Spider-Man: Beyond the Spider-Verse (2027)

== Awards and nominations ==
Year	Award	Title	Category	Result	Ref(s)
2023	Children's and Family Emmy Awards	Lost Ollie	Outstanding Directing for a Single Camera Program	Won	
2022	Children's and Family Emmy Awards	We the People	Outstanding Short Form Program	Won	
2019	Academy Awards	Spider-Man: Into the Spider-Verse	Best Animated Feature	Won	
2019	Annie Awards	Spider-Man: Into the Spider-Verse	Directing in a Feature Production	Won	
2019	British Academy Film Awards	Spider-Man: Into the Spider-Verse	Best Animated Film	Won	
2019	Critics' Choice Movie Awards	Spider-Man: Into the Spider-Verse	Best Animated Feature	Won	
2013	Golden Globe Awards	Rise of the Guardians	Best Animated Feature Film	Nominated	
2019	Golden Globe Awards	Spider-Man: Into the Spider-Verse	Best Animated Feature Film	Won	
2019	Hugo Awards	Spider-Man: Into the Spider-Verse	Best Dramatic Presentation	Won	
2012	Visual Effects Society Awards	Rise of the Guardians	Outstanding Visual Effects in an Animated Feature	Nominated	
