= Joel Crawford (director) =

American storyboard artist and director

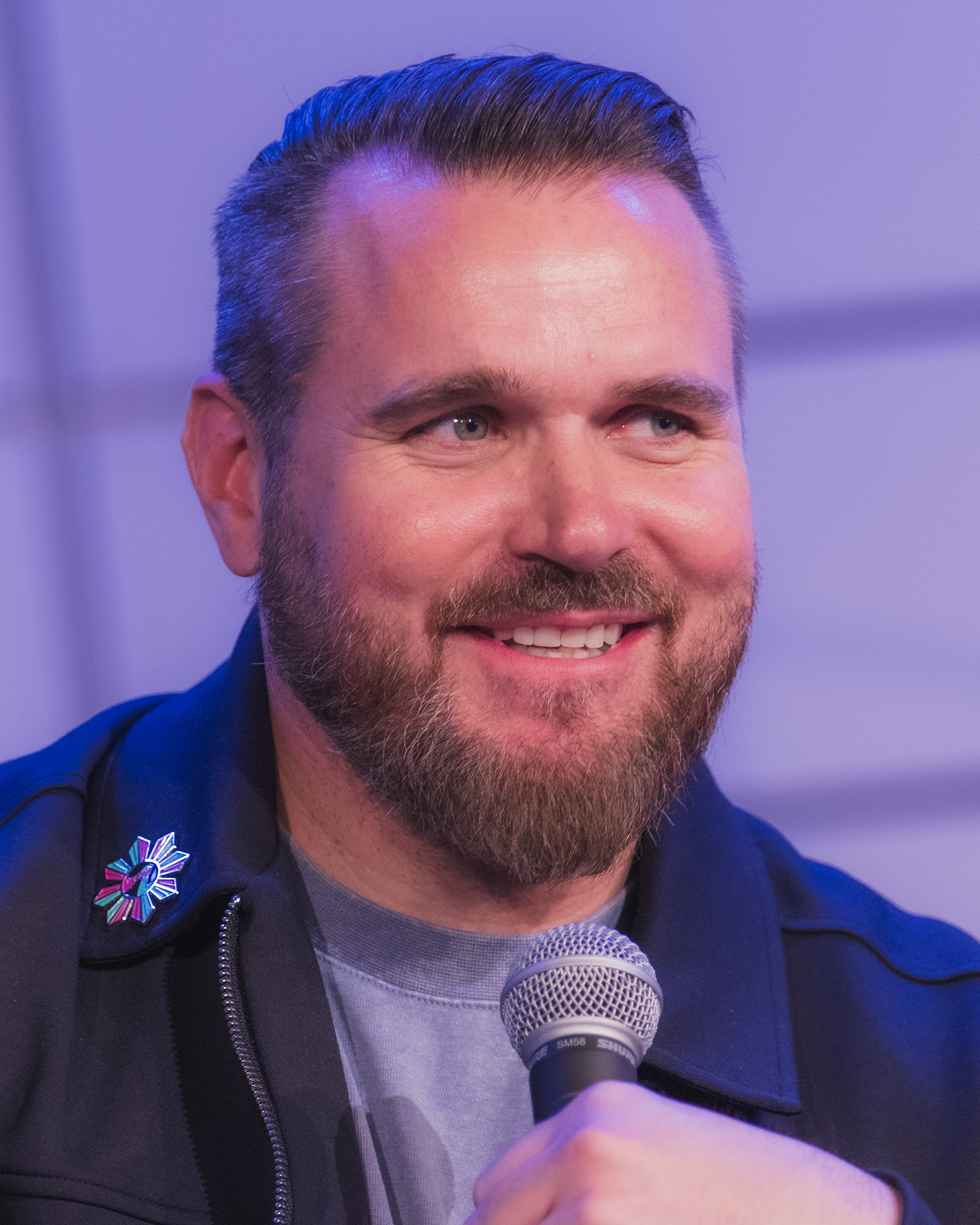
- Crawford in 2026
- Education: CalArts
- Occupations: Film director; storyboard artist; Screenwriter
- Years active: 2006–present
- Employer: DreamWorks Animation (2006–present)
- Notable work: The Croods: A New Age; Puss in Boots: The Last Wish; Forgotten Island

Joel Crawford is an American film director, storyboard artist and screenwriter. He is best known for his work at DreamWorks Animation, including directing The Croods: A New Age (2020), Puss in Boots: The Last Wish (2022), and Forgotten Island (2026). He received an Academy Award nomination for Puss in Boots: The Last Wish.

== Career ==
In 2006, Crawford joined DreamWorks Animation, where he served as a story artist on Bee Movie (2007), the Kung Fu Panda trilogy (2008–16), Shrek Forever After (2010), and Rise of the Guardians (2012). In October 2017, Crawford signed on to direct The Croods: A New Age (2020), replacing both Kirk DeMicco and Chris Sanders as director. In November 2017, Crawford directed Trolls Holiday, a half-hour Christmas-themed spinoff of Trolls (2016). In March 2021, Crawford replaced Bob Persichetti as director of Puss in Boots: The Last Wish (2022).

On June 3, 2023, Crawford received an honorary degree from the Savannah College of Art and Design for his contributions to animation. In April 2025, he signed on to write and direct Forgotten Island (2026) for DreamWorks Animation, alongside his longtime best friend Januel Mercado. Their friendship is a major inspiration for the movie's story.

== Filmography ==
Year	Title	Credited as					Notes
Year	Title	Director	Story artist	Writer	Actor	Other	Notes
2007	Bee Movie	No	Yes	No	No	No	
2008	Kung Fu Panda	No	Yes	No	No	No	
2010	Shrek Forever After	No	Yes	No	No	No	
2011	Kung Fu Panda 2	No	Yes	No	No	No	
2012	Rise of the Guardians	No	Yes	No	No	No	
2015	The SpongeBob Movie: Sponge Out of Water	No	Yes	No	No	No	
2016	Kung Fu Panda 3	No	Yes	No	No	No	
2016	Trolls	No	Yes	No	No	No	Head of story
2017	Trolls Holiday	Yes	No	No	No	No	TV special
2019	The Lego Movie 2: The Second Part	No	Yes	No	No	No	
2019	Trouble	No	No	No	No	Yes	Special thanks
2020	The Croods: A New Age	Yes	No	No	Yes	No	Role: Guy's Dad
2022	Puss in Boots: The Last Wish	Yes	No	No	Yes	No	Role: Baker's Dozen Member, Band Player
2023	Ruby Gillman, Teenage Kraken	No	No	No	No	Yes	Creative leadership: DreamWorks Animation; Special thanks
2023	Trolls Band Together	No	No	No	No	Yes	Special thanks
2024	Kung Fu Panda 4	No	No	No	No	Yes	Special thanks
2024	The Wild Robot	No	No	No	No	Yes	Special thanks
2026	Forgotten Island	Yes	No	Yes	Yes	No	Role: Doctor, Crimson Cow, Additional voices

== Accolades ==
Award	Date of ceremony	Category	Film	Result	Ref.
Golden Globe Awards	February 28, 2021	Best Animated Feature Film	The Croods: A New Age	Nominated	
Visual Effects Society Awards	April 6, 2021	Outstanding Visual Effects in an Animated Feature	The Croods: A New Age	Nominated	
Golden Globe Awards	January 10, 2023	Best Animated Feature Film	Puss in Boots: The Last Wish	Nominated	
British Academy Film Awards	February 19, 2023	Best Animated Film	Puss in Boots: The Last Wish	Nominated	
Academy Awards	March 12, 2023	Best Animated Feature	Puss in Boots: The Last Wish	Nominated	
