= Rodney Rothman =

American filmmaker and author

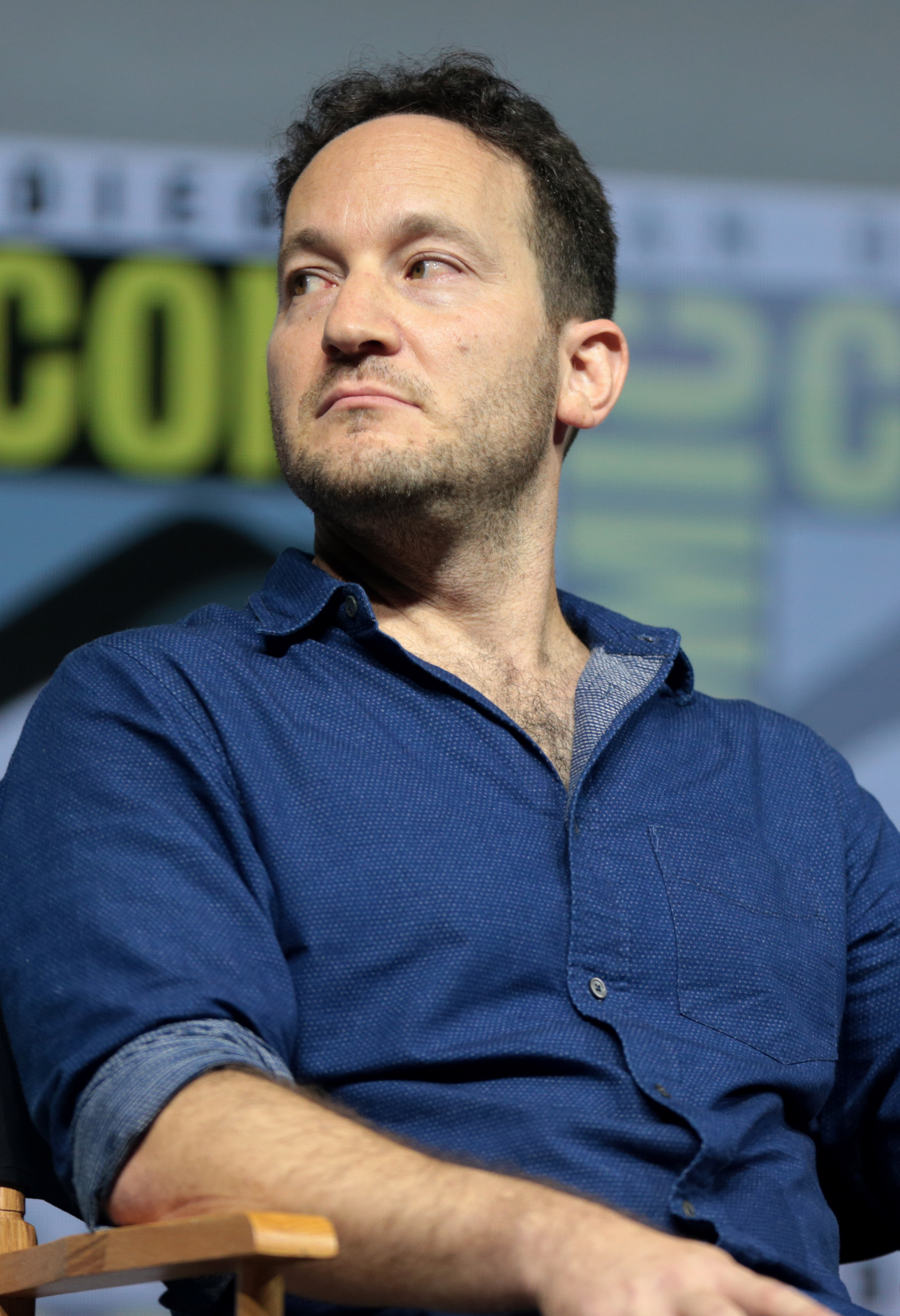
- Rothman at the 2018 San Diego Comic-Con
- Born: United States
- Occupations: Filmmaker, writer

Rodney Rothman is an American filmmaker and author. He is known for his work on Spider-Man: Into the Spider-Verse (2018) (which served as his feature directorial debut), Popstar: Never Stop Never Stopping (2016), 22 Jump Street (2014), Forgetting Sarah Marshall (2008), and Get Him to the Greek (2010), as well as being part of the writing staff of the shows Undeclared and Late Show with David Letterman. He has been nominated for five Primetime Emmy Awards for Outstanding Writing for a Variety Series.

Rothman is the author of the best-selling nonfiction humor book Early Bird: A Memoir of Premature Retirement. His writing has also appeared in The New Yorker, GQ, The New York Times, The New York Times Magazine, and McSweeney's Quarterly. His piece "My Fake Job" was included in The Best American Nonrequired Reading. He has also written for other books, Such as Camp Camp by Rodger Bennet.

His work on Spider-Man: Into the Spider-Verse earned him the Academy Award for Best Animated Feature, the Golden Globe Award for Best Animated Feature Film and Annie Awards for Directing and Writing in a Feature Production.

== Career ==
In 2005, Rothman wrote the book Early Bird: A Memoir of Premature Retirement. He has been nominated for five Primetime Emmy Awards for Outstanding Writing for a Variety Series, and also wrote the scripts for Grudge Match, 22 Jump Street and Spider-Man: Into the Spider-Verse, which served as his feature directorial debut. He co-directed the film with Bob Persichetti and Peter Ramsey, and co-wrote with Phil Lord. His work on the film earned him the Academy Award for Best Animated Feature, the Golden Globe Award for Best Animated Feature Film and Annie Awards for Directing and Writing in a Feature Production.

In 2021, Rothman partnered with former MGM Co-President of Production Adam Rosenberg to form Modern Magic, a media company focused "on creating event entertainment for the 21st-century audience, across animation and live-action". Upcoming projects include collaborations with Stephen Curry, Billie Eilish, Finneas O'Connell, Neal Stephenson, Ricky Williams, Junji Ito, an original animated feature inspired by the music of the late rapper Juice WRLD, an animated feature based on the SXSW award-winning short film Nuevo Rico, another animated series with hour-long episodes based on Wendy and Richard Pini’s influential comic series Elfquest, and a live-action feature that Quinta Brunson is currently scripting for Sony Pictures.

In August 2022, Rothman revealed on Twitter that he was the person who Chris Farley picked up and threw into a dumpster during Farley's appearance on Late Show with David Letterman in February 1996. Rothman was a writer at the Late Show at the time.

== Filmography ==
=== Television ===
Year	Title	Writer	Producer	Notes
1995–2000	Late Show with David Letterman	Yes	Yes	Apprentice writer (1995–1996), Staff writer (1996–1998), Head writer (1998–2000), Producer (1999–2000)
2001–2002	Undeclared	Yes	supervising	
2004	Game Over	No	consultant	
2004	$5.15/hr.	Yes	executive	TV pilot for HBO
2005	Early Bird	No	executive	Creator, TV pilot for NBC
2005	Committed	Yes	supervising	
2006	Help Me Help You	Yes	executive	
2006	The 78th Annual Academy Awards	Yes	No	

=== Film ===
Year	Title	Director	Writer	Notes
2013	Grudge Match	No	Yes	
2014	22 Jump Street	No	Yes	
2018	Spider-Man: Into the Spider-Verse	Yes	Yes	Co-director with Bob Persichetti and Peter Ramsey
TBA	24 Jump Street	Yes	Yes	Co-writer with Jonah Hill and Meghan Malloy

=== Executive producer ===
- Year One (2009)
- Spider-Man: Across the Spider-Verse (2023)
- Spider-Man: Beyond the Spider-Verse (2027)

=== Producer ===
- Forgetting Sarah Marshall (2008)
- Get Him to the Greek (2010)
- The Five-Year Engagement (2012)
- Popstar: Never Stop Never Stopping (2016)
- Goat (2026)
