= Spider-Man: Beyond the Spider-Verse =

Upcoming animated superhero film

- Official logo
- Directed by: Bob Persichetti; Justin K. Thompson
- Written by: Phil Lord Christopher Miller; David Callaham
- Based on: Marvel Comics
- Produced by: Phil Lord; Christopher Miller; Amy Pascal; Avi Arad; Jinko Gotoh
- Starring: Shameik Moore; Hailee Steinfeld; Brian Tyree Henry; Lauren Vélez; Jake Johnson; Jason Schwartzman; Karan Soni; John Mulaney; Kimiko Glenn; Daniel Kaluuya; Mahershala Ali; Nicolas Cage; Oscar Isaac
- Cinematography: Alice Brooks
- Edited by: Mike Andrews
- Music by: Daniel Pemberton
- Production companies: Columbia Pictures; Sony Pictures Animation; Arad Productions; Lord Miller Productions; Pascal Pictures
- Distributed by: Sony Pictures Releasing
- Release date: June 18, 2027
- Country: United States
- Language: English

Spider-Man: Beyond the Spider-Verse is an upcoming American animated superhero film based on the Marvel Comics character Miles Morales / Spider-Man. Produced by Columbia Pictures and Sony Pictures Animation, it is the direct sequel to Spider-Man: Across the Spider-Verse (2023) and the final installment in the Spider-Verse trilogy. Shameik Moore stars as the voice of Miles, alongside an ensemble cast featuring Hailee Steinfeld, Brian Tyree Henry, Lauren Vélez, Jake Johnson, Jason Schwartzman, Karan Soni, John Mulaney, Kimiko Glenn, Daniel Kaluuya, Mahershala Ali, Nicolas Cage, and Oscar Isaac. Directed by Bob Persichetti and Justin K. Thompson, the screenplay was written by the duo of Phil Lord and Christopher Miller alongside David Callaham.

Sony began developing a sequel to Spider-Man: Into the Spider-Verse before its 2018 release. During production, the sequel was split into two films—Across the Spider-Verse and Beyond the Spider-Verse—that were being worked on concurrently. The latter was initially given a March 2024 release date, before the former was prioritized. Lord and Miller described Beyond as more emotional than its predecessors by focusing on Miles attempting to save his family, with the story continuing directly from the cliffhanger ending of Across. The script and animation provided by Sony Pictures Imageworks for Beyond subsequently changed significantly during production, which was temporarily suspended by the 2023 SAG-AFTRA strike, while Sony unscheduled the film from its release date to give the filmmakers and animators enough time to complete their work. After the second film's release and the end of the strike, production resumed in December 2023. The writers and directors were revealed a year later, after they worked on the previous installments, and it was rescheduled for a 2027 release in early 2025, by which point voice recording was underway with several returning actors. Lord and Miller used the Unreal Engine and a virtual camera, directed by cinematographer Alice Brooks, for previsualization after doing so on their live-action film Project Hail Mary (2026).

Spider-Man: Beyond the Spider-Verse is scheduled to be released by Sony Pictures in the United States on June 18, 2027.

== Premise ==
Spider-Man: Beyond the Spider-Verse begins immediately after the events of Spider-Man: Across the Spider-Verse (2023), following Miles Morales trapped and on the run in an alternate universe while trying to save his family.

== Voice cast ==
- Shameik Moore as Miles Morales / Spider-Man: A teenager who took over as the Spider-Man of Earth-1610 after the death of his reality's Peter Parker and is trapped in an alternate universe, Earth-42
- Hailee Steinfeld as Gwen Stacy / Spider-Gwen: A version of Gwen Stacy who is the Spider-Woman of Earth-65 and Miles's love interest
- Brian Tyree Henry as Jefferson Morales (né Davis): Miles's father and a police officer, who was recently promoted to captain
- Lauren Vélez as Rio Morales: Miles's mother and a nurse
- Jake Johnson as Peter B. Parker / Spider-Man: An older Spider-Man from Earth-616B and Miles's mentor who is now married to his reality's Mary Jane Watson and has a daughter named Mayday
- Jason Schwartzman as Dr. Johnathon Ohnn / The Spot:
  A supervillain and former Alchemax scientist who, after an accident, became covered with interdimensional portals that allow him to travel through space and different universes. Miles's nemesis, he sets out to destroy their home universe and murder Miles's father.
- Karan Soni as Pavitr Prabhakar / Spider-Man India: An alternate universe version of Peter Parker based in Mumbattan, India
- John Mulaney as Peter Porker / Spider-Ham: A talking animal-based Spider-Man from a cartoon-like anthropomorphic universe, who was once a spider, bitten by a radioactive pig
- Kimiko Glenn as Peni Parker / SP//dr: A young Japanese-American girl from an alternative and anime-like universe who copilots her late father's biomechanical suit with a radioactive spider that she shares a telepathic link with
- Daniel Kaluuya as Hobie Brown / Spider-Punk: A punk rock version of Spider-Man from Earth-138 who uses his guitar as his main weapon
- Mahershala Ali as Aaron Davis: The Earth-42 version of Miles's deceased uncle
- Nicolas Cage as Peter Parker / Spider-Man Noir: A Spider-Man from a monochromatic universe set in the 1930s
- Oscar Isaac as Miguel O'Hara / Spider-Man 2099: A "ninja-vampire" Spider-Man from Earth-928 set in the year 2099, who is the leader of the Spider-Society, a group of Spider-People from alternate universes tasked with protecting the multiverse

Additional cast members reprising their voice roles from the previous Spider-Verse films are Marvin Jones III as Lonnie Lincoln / Tombstone, an albino gangster, Greta Lee as Lyla, the artificial intelligence assistant for the Spider-Society and Miguel O'Hara, and Jharrel Jerome as the Earth-42 version of Miles G. Morales / The Prowler.

== Production ==
=== Development ===
==== Initial work, production shifts, and delays ====
By November 2018, ahead of the release of Spider-Man: Into the Spider-Verse (2018) the next month, Sony Pictures Animation had begun development on a sequel to the film. Phil Lord and Christopher Miller returned from the first film as producers. After writing down the story they wanted to tell for the sequel, which featured the character the Spot as the villain, while a planned third film was in early development, they realized that it was too much for a single film and decided to split the second film into two parts by February 2021. This was revealed in December 2021 along with the titles Spider-Man: Across the Spider-Verse (Part One) and (Part Two). Work on both parts was taking place simultaneously, with Lord and Miller working on them with directors Joaquim Dos Santos, Kemp Powers, and Justin K. Thompson. The second part was initially expected to be released in 2023, but in April 2022 it was given a release date of March 29, 2024, when Sony Pictures pushed the release of the first part from October 2022 to June 2023. The two films were renamed at that time, becoming Spider-Man: Across the Spider-Verse (2023) and Spider-Man: Beyond the Spider-Verse. Around this time, major aspects of the third film's script, storyboards, and some visual development work and concept tests that occurred when the film was being developed as the second part were reportedly shelved and put on hold so those resources could be used to complete the second film first. By then, Beyond the Spider-Verse was internally not expected to meet its March 2024 release date, which was deemed unrealistic due to the film's technical aspects and high expectations, and it was not expected to be released until 2026 or 2027. During the Annecy International Animation Film Festival in June 2022, Sony announced that the Spot would serve as the antagonist in both Across the Spider-Verse and Beyond the Spider-Verse.

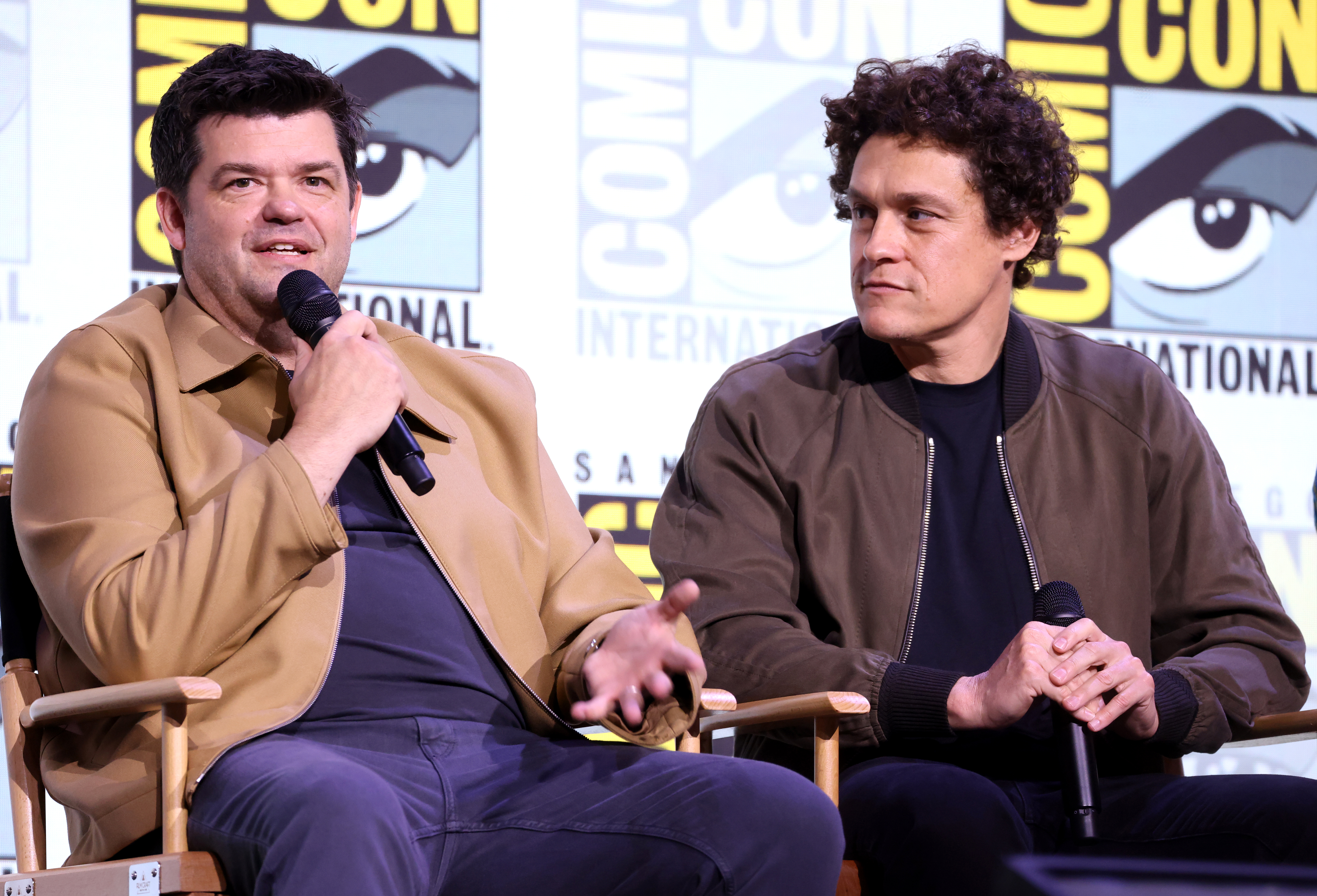
Co-writers and producers Christopher Miller and Phil Lord changed plans for the third Spider-Verse film after splitting the second film into two parts.

In May 2023, Miller said that while the beginning and ending of Beyond the Spider-Verse had been relatively figured out, the middle was "still a little squishy". Following the release of Across the Spider-Verse the next month, Lord and Miller said that Beyond would conclude the Spider-Verse trilogy and Miles Morales's story arc. They also responded to reports of potential delays and a lack of production progress, saying the production would take a necessary amount of time to complete the film and that they would not reserve a release date if it did not align with their schedule. At that time, Sony reportedly restarted work on the script, which did not include an ending. In July, Sony removed Beyond the Spider-Verse from its release schedule due to the 2023 SAG-AFTRA strike, which prevented the voice cast from recording dialogue. Sony subsequently gave Ghostbusters: Frozen Empire the March 2024 date, and a new release date was expected to be scheduled in the following weeks. After the strike ended in November, voice recording was set to resume imminently, although it was unclear if the film would still be released in 2024. Production had resumed by December 2023.

In June 2024, composer Daniel Pemberton said the creative team was "beavering away" on the film. He admitted that they felt pressured in making the film as the trilogy's conclusion because they had set a high bar for themselves, explaining that they sought to avoid repeating the "mistakes" of the third installments in other franchises, such as The Godfather Part III (1990). Karan Soni, who voices Pavitr Prabhakar / Spider-Man India, said in August that voice recording was slated to begin in "a few months" and that the film was "deep in production". The following month, journalist Jeff Sneider reported that Beyond the Spider-Verse was unlikely to be released until 2027 at the earliest. He said this was to allow the animators more time to work on the film after several scenes were scrapped and changed, and because Sony was not expected to release it within the same calendar year as its live-action film Spider-Man: Brand New Day, which was scheduled for release in July 2026; Sony ultimately did not plan to release the film in 2025. Sneider reported that this delay surprised some of its animators, who were said to be relieved by the decision. Pemberton and Miller subsequently denied that a majority of the film had been "scrapped" as previously reported, saying that the film reels were being produced.

==== Continued work post-delays ====
Bob Persichetti and Thompson were confirmed to be directing Beyond the Spider-Verse in December 2024, when Jinko Gotoh joined as a producer, while Lord and Miller were confirmed to have written the script with Across the Spider-Verse co-writer David Callaham; Persichetti was a co-director of Into the Spider-Verse and an executive producer of Across the Spider-Verse, whereas Thompson was a production designer on the first film and a co-director of the latter. While Powers and Dos Santos were expected to return as directors from Across the Spider-Verse alongside Thompson, Miller clarified that Persichetti and Thompson were the directors since production began. In January 2025, Jharrel Jerome—the voice actor for the Earth-42 version of Miles G. Morales / Prowler—said voice recording had yet to begin because the production was still "figuring out" several details, but felt positive about the process. At Sony's CinemaCon panel in March, the trio of Lord, Persichetti, and Thompson acknowledged the importance of the Spider-Verse franchise to several audiences. The pair announced the film's new release date of June 4, 2027, explaining that they "could not run it back" and were ensuring they were taking enough time to make the film right. In July 2025, the release date was delayed by three weeks to June 25, 2027, but was moved up in September 2025 to June 18, 2027.

In February 2026, Sony Pictures Animation co-presidents Damien de Froberville and Kristine Belson said that Lord and Miller were able to frequently "iterate" and provide notes on Beyond the Spider-Verse while the story was being developed, which allowed for fewer changes in animation sequences towards the end of production. They said this was complemented by Lord and Miller editing their film Project Hail Mary (2026) on the Sony Pictures Studios lot, allowing them to collaborate closely with the Beyond the Spider-Verse crew. Lord and Miller reiterated their desire to elevate the film from its predecessors, and cited the main contributor to the delays as the crew "[h]aving to take it apart to put it back together again". The following month, Lord and Miller reaffirmed that Beyond the Spider-Verse was on schedule to meet its June 2027 release date, adding in early July that the crew was well into the editing process, which he said was "coming together really well", and were focused on incrementally improving the film.

=== Writing ===
Lord and Miller called Beyond the Spider-Verse the most emotional film of the Spider-Verse trilogy, a "massive finale", and a "satisfying conclusion" to the trilogy's story. Lord explained that Beyond the Spider-Verse starts immediately after the cliffhanger ending of Across the Spider-Verse, which saw Miles trapped in an alternate universe known as Earth-42, and that it would see Miles deal with a "sense of betrayal" and explore how it becomes affirmative through the goodness and love the other characters have for him and how this "translates into his growth and success". Beyond the Spider-Verse sees Miles on the run as a fugitive from the Spider-People across the multiverse and that he may not be able to rely on his friends, such as Gwen, to help him save his family. During the writing process, Lord and Miller realized that they did not have a complete three-act structure for the film until they devised a theme for the middle of the story, questioning "when your family is broken apart by your calling, your talents, how do you put them back together? How do you have it all?"

=== Casting and voice recording ===
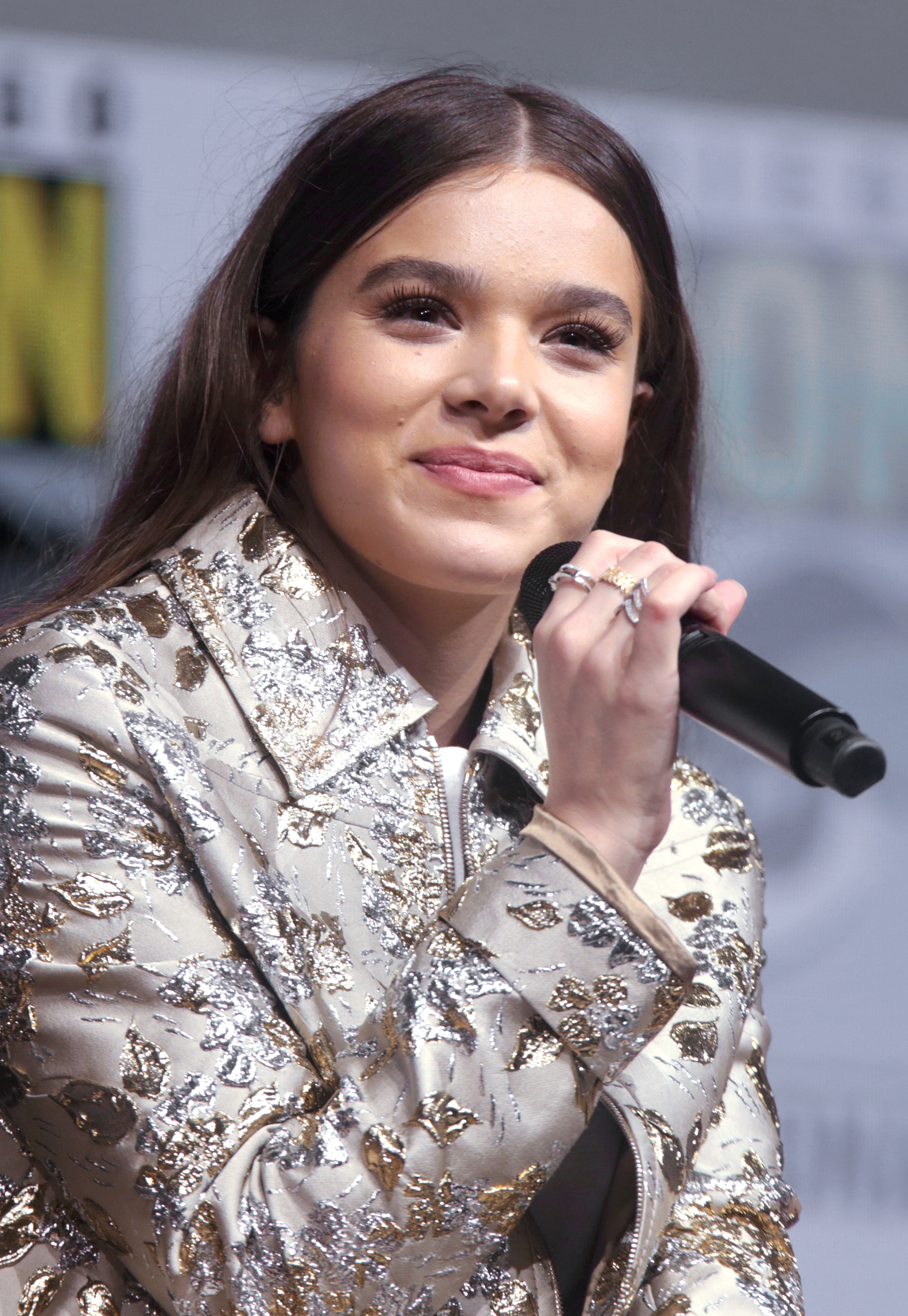
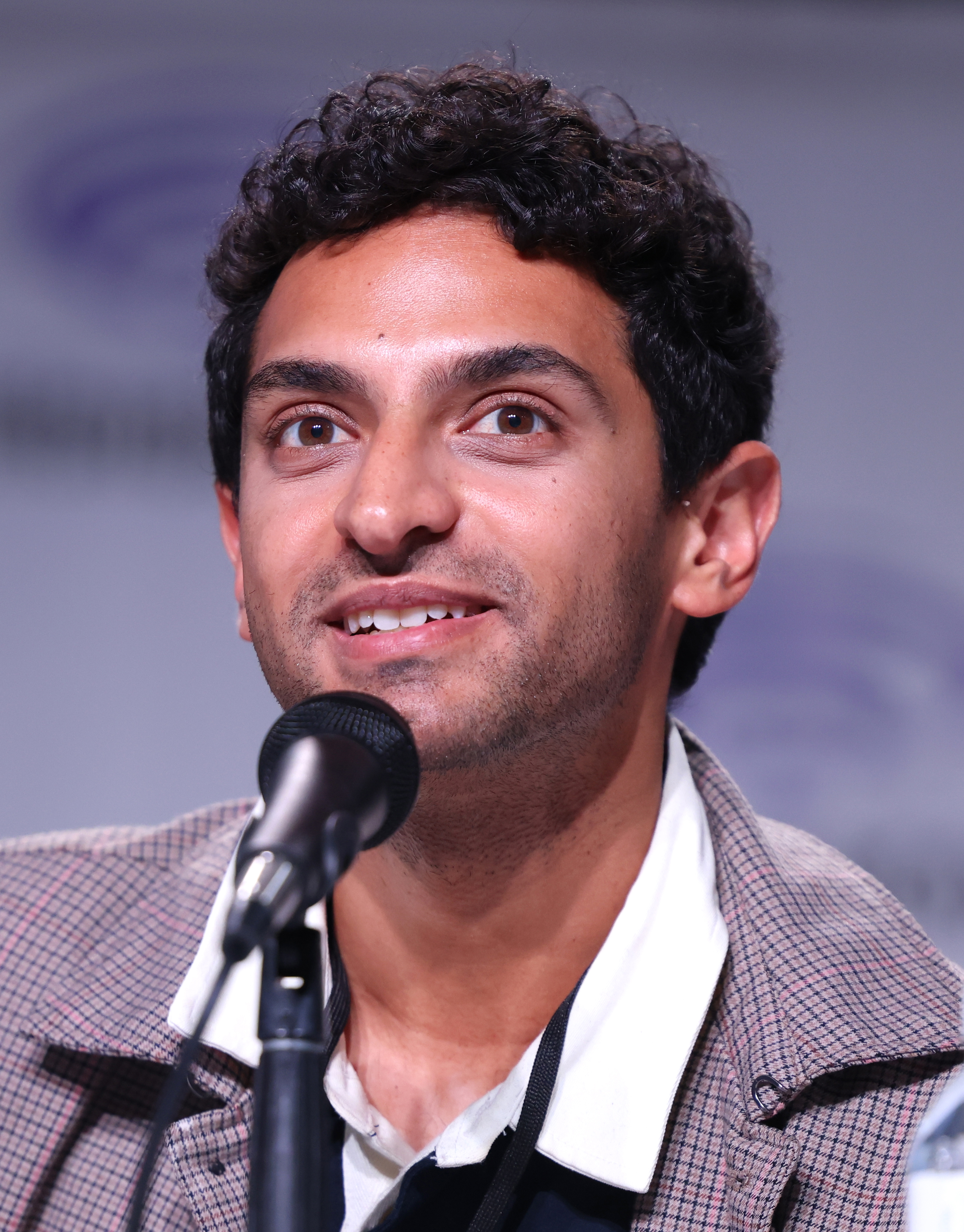
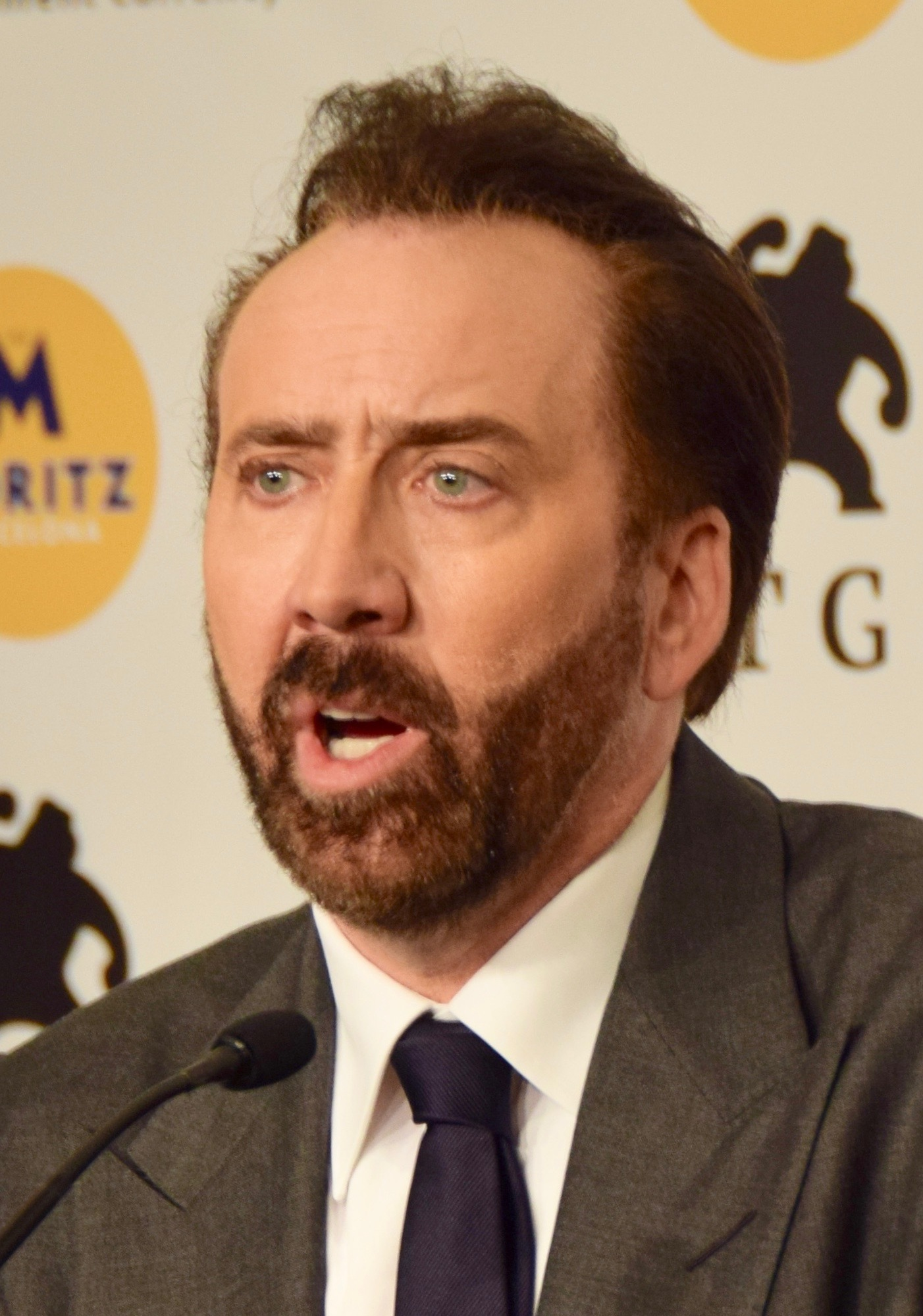
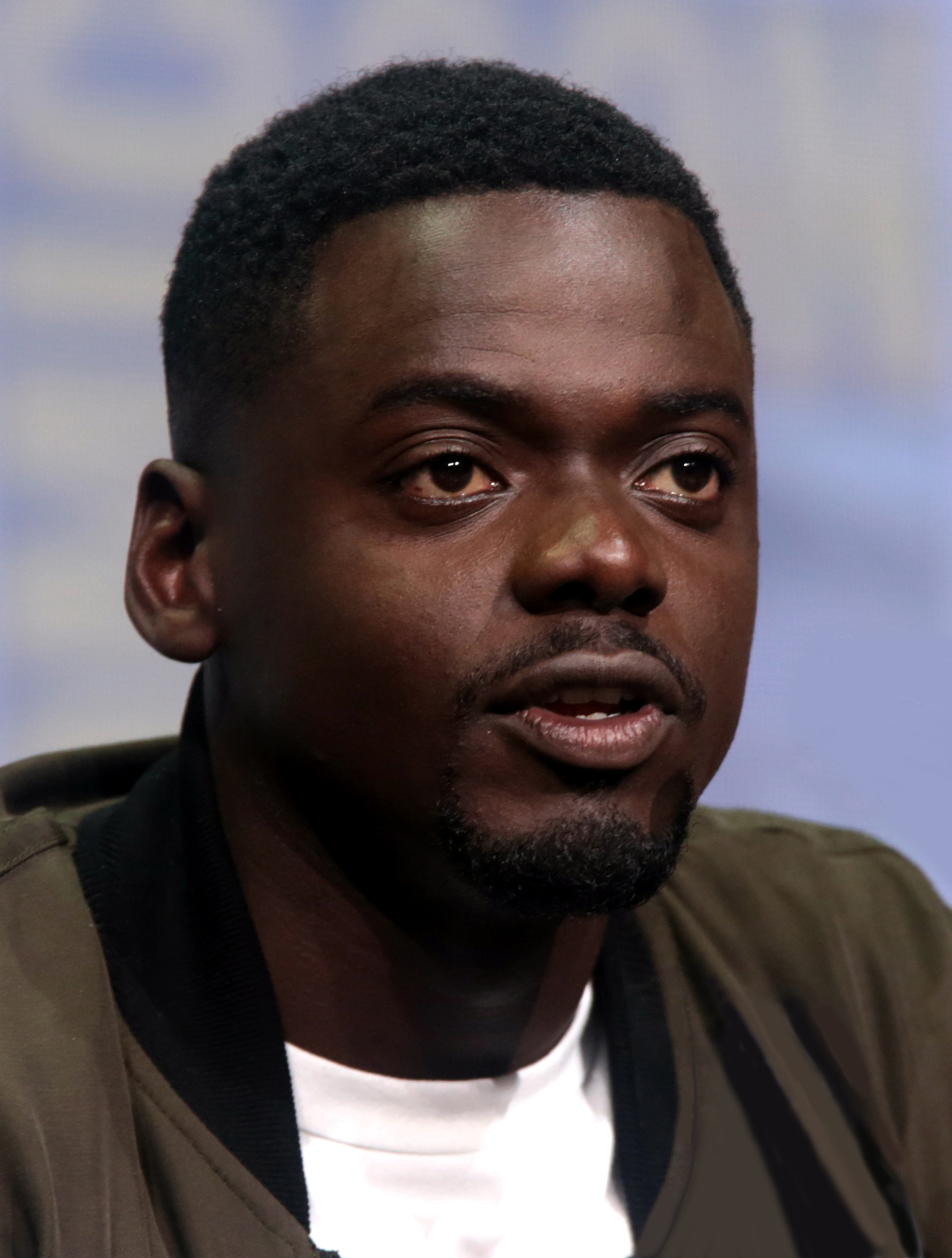
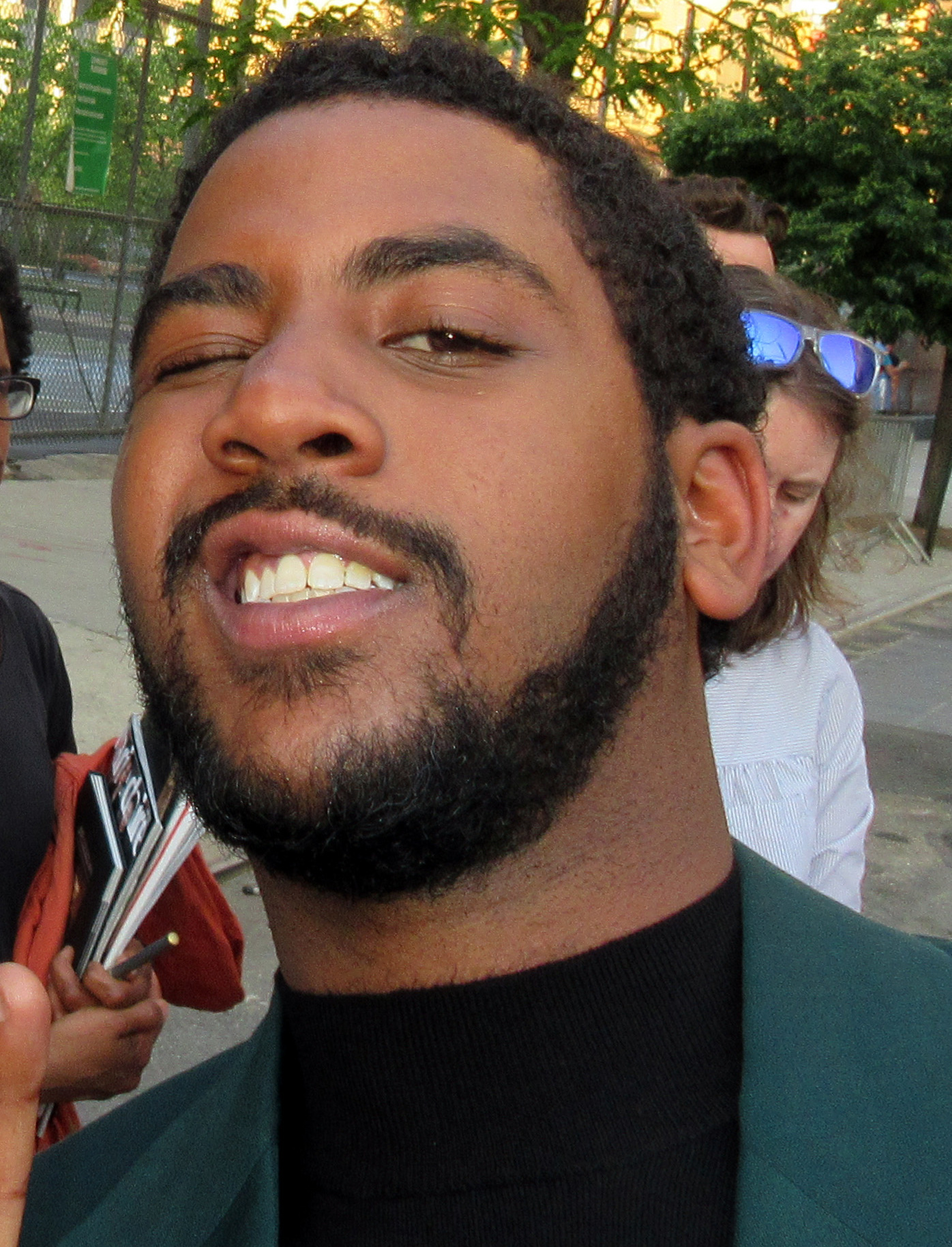
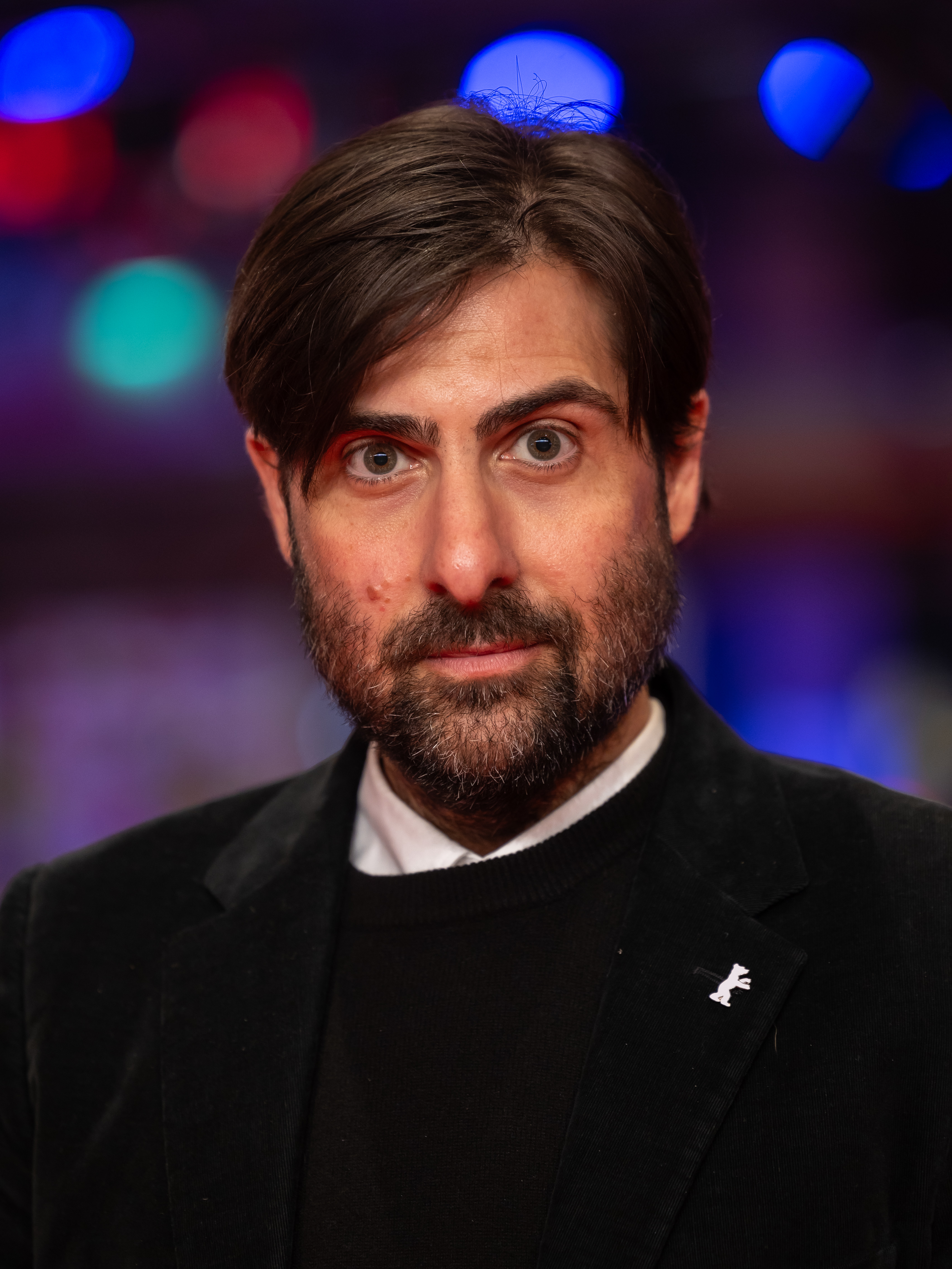
Hailee Steinfeld, Karan Soni, Nicolas Cage, Daniel Kaluuya, and Jharrel Jerome return to voice several Spider-People, while Jason Schwartzman returns as the villain the Spot (left to right, top-down)

Several actors reprise their roles from the previous Spider-Verse films, including Shameik Moore as Miles Morales, Hailee Steinfeld as Gwen Stacy / Spider-Gwen, Karan Soni as Pavitr Prabhakar / Spider-Man India, Jason Schwartzman as the Spot, Daniel Kaluuya as Hobie Brown / Spider-Punk, Nicolas Cage as Spider-Man Noir, Jake Johnson as Peter B. Parker, John Mulaney as Peter Porker / Spider-Ham, Kimiko Glenn as Peni Parker, Brian Tyree Henry as Jefferson Morales (né Davis), Lauren Vélez as Rio Morales, Jharrel Jerome as the Miles G. Morales / Prowler of Earth-42, Marvin Jones III as Lonnie Lincoln / Tombstone, and Greta Lee as the AI assistant Lyla.

The voice recording process was delayed by the SAG-AFTRA strike by July 2023, and was set to resume that November after the strike ended. Soni said in August 2024 that voice recording would start in the following months, but Jerome said it had yet to begin by January 2025. Steinfeld had started some recordings by April and said they were "well into" that process, Moore and Jerome were recording their lines by August, and Johnson had been recording his lines for several months by March 2026. Lee recorded her lines alongside Across the Spider-Verse.

=== Animation and design ===
Beyond the Spider-Verse features a wider variation of animation styles than the first two films. Sony Pictures Imageworks is providing art and designs for the film, with Mike Andrews returning as the lead editor from Across the Spider-Verse. Cinematographer Alice Brooks worked on the film. De Froberville noted that, given her work on live-action films, Brooks could direct the camera in a new way not used on the previous two films. Miller said they used the Unreal Engine and a virtual camera for previsualization after doing so with cinematographer Greig Fraser on Project Hail Mary. Lord and Miller added that the film would feature artistically abstract portal scenes for the Spot, and was designed to fit IMAX's 1.43:1 expanded aspect ratio. The duo explained that they were focused on capturing every detail up close in each frame while "doing something that hasn't been done before".

After Sony Pictures CEO Tony Vinciquerra said in May 2024 that the studio was exploring different opportunities to make their films less expensive and more efficient by primarily using artificial intelligence (AI), which was a central issue in the 2023 Hollywood labor disputes, Miller responded to concerns regarding the use of AI in Beyond the Spider-Verse, stating that generative AI would not be used in the film. He explained their goal for the Spider-Verse films was to create visual styles not used in major computer-animated films and not to repurpose other artists' work through AI. Sony Pictures Imageworks used some machine learning technology, distinct from generative AI and based on work already done on the project, to assist animators during the production of the franchise's preceding films. In October 2026, Persichetti said that the strong reception to the preceding films' distinct, sophisticated, and unorthodox animation styles, along with technological advancements since they were made, allowed the crew more creative freedom to holistically explore and test different visual styles earlier in development. He believed this would enhance the "visual extravagance" as the "narrative throughline" because audiences were more comfortable and receptive to rapidly changing visual designs and palettes.

=== Music ===
Daniel Pemberton, the composer of the first two films, confirmed he would return in June 2024, when he was focused on connecting the Beyond the Spider-Verse score with those of the prior films to provide cohesion between them.

== Marketing ==
Lord, Persichetti, and Thompson debuted the first footage from the film at Sony's CinemaCon panel in March 2025. The footage highlighted a monologue of Miles declaring he would do things "his way" after lamenting about others telling him how his story should play out. Rebecca Rubin at Variety noted that the footage appeared to show Miles facing an existential crisis. To coincide with the presentation, Sony released five promotional stills featuring Miles, Gwen, and the Earth-42 Prowler from the film online, which Kaitlyn Booth of Bleeding Cool felt would "make the long wait a little more bearable". She described the footage as a brief tease of how the film was "once again reshaping and reimagining what it means to animate a film". Germain Lussier at Gizmodo compared the footage's various shapes and colors to the visuals from the film 2001: A Space Odyssey (1968).

Perschietti, Thompson, Lord, and Miller presented new footage at CinemaCon in April 2026, followed by Sony releasing four additional stills online. Writers for DiscussingFilm described the footage as an "explosive sizzle reel" and said the various "striking" visual styles would make the film "well worth the long wait" after its several delays. The four-and-a-half-minute-long rough cut footage leaked online in August, which Miller condemned. He stated that the footage was not yet complete or fully rendered. James Hibberd of The Hollywood Reporter and John Walker at Kotaku described the extended footage as a combination of what they believed was the opening scene of Beyond the Spider-Verse—continuing immediately after the Across the Spider-Verse cliffhanger ending—that was followed by a trailer montage. They highlighted positive responses to the leaked footage online and felt it was more suitable for a fan convention, such as CinemaCon. Gizmodo's Isaiah Colbert said labeling the footage a trailer was "a bit of a misnomer". He compared the rapid circulation of the footage to fans "treating the Spider-Verse morsel like the second coming, which is hard not to blame them for, given the film's numerous delays and the general malaise over how long it would take between its second entry and the third to give the animated movie all the TLC [tender loving care] it deserves." Walker commended the high quality for such a leak, but conversely expressed some frustrations at the lack of an official trailer after Across the Spider-Verse "rather notoriously ended on a cliffhanger". He stated, "That there was then to be a four-year wait before the movie we were in the middle of watching carried on made it feel all the more odd of a choice. But now, with less than a year to go, it's probably about time Sony started building some hype, while also reminding us where things had left off. Except, this appears to be happening against its will." In October, Persichetti presented the same work-in-progress footage at the Javits Center in New York, ahead of New York Comic Con, when Dade Hayes at Deadline Hollywood noted that Sony was "holding back for now on an official teaser".

== Release ==
=== Theatrical ===
Spider-Man: Beyond the Spider-Verse is scheduled to be theatrically released by Sony Pictures Releasing in the United States on June 18, 2027, in IMAX and premium large formats (PLFs), the first Sony animated film to do so. The film will be presented in the 1.43:1 aspect ratio for IMAX. It was originally scheduled to be released on March 29, 2024, but was removed from Sony's release calendar in July 2023, due to production delays and the SAG-AFTRA strike preventing voice recording work. In March 2025, Beyond the Spider-Verse was given a release date of June 4, 2027, but this was pushed back three weeks later to June 25, to accommodate the film's K–12 target audience and international markets, before moving forward a week for the Father's Day weekend.

=== Home media ===
In April 2021, Sony signed deals with Netflix and Disney for the rights to their 2022 to 2026 film slate, following the films' theatrical and home media windows. Netflix signed for exclusive "pay 1 window" streaming rights, which is typically an 18-month window and included the sequels to Spider-Man: Into the Spider-Verse; this deal built on an existing output deal that Netflix had signed with Sony Pictures Animation in 2014. Disney signed for "pay 2 window" rights to the films, which would stream on Disney+ and Hulu and broadcast on Disney's linear television networks. In January 2026, Sony and Netflix announced a new agreement giving Netflix "pay 1 window" rights globally, an increase from just the United States, Germany, and Southeast Asia in the previous deal. The new agreement would begin later in 2026 as territory rights became available, before fully taking effect in early 2029.
