= Golden Globe Award for Best Animated Feature Film =

American film award since 2007

Golden Globe for Best Animated Feature Film
- Awarded for: Best Animated Motion Picture
- Location: United States
- Presented by: Dick Clark Productions
- First award: Cars (2006)
- Currently held by: KPop Demon Hunters (2025)
- Website: goldenglobes.com

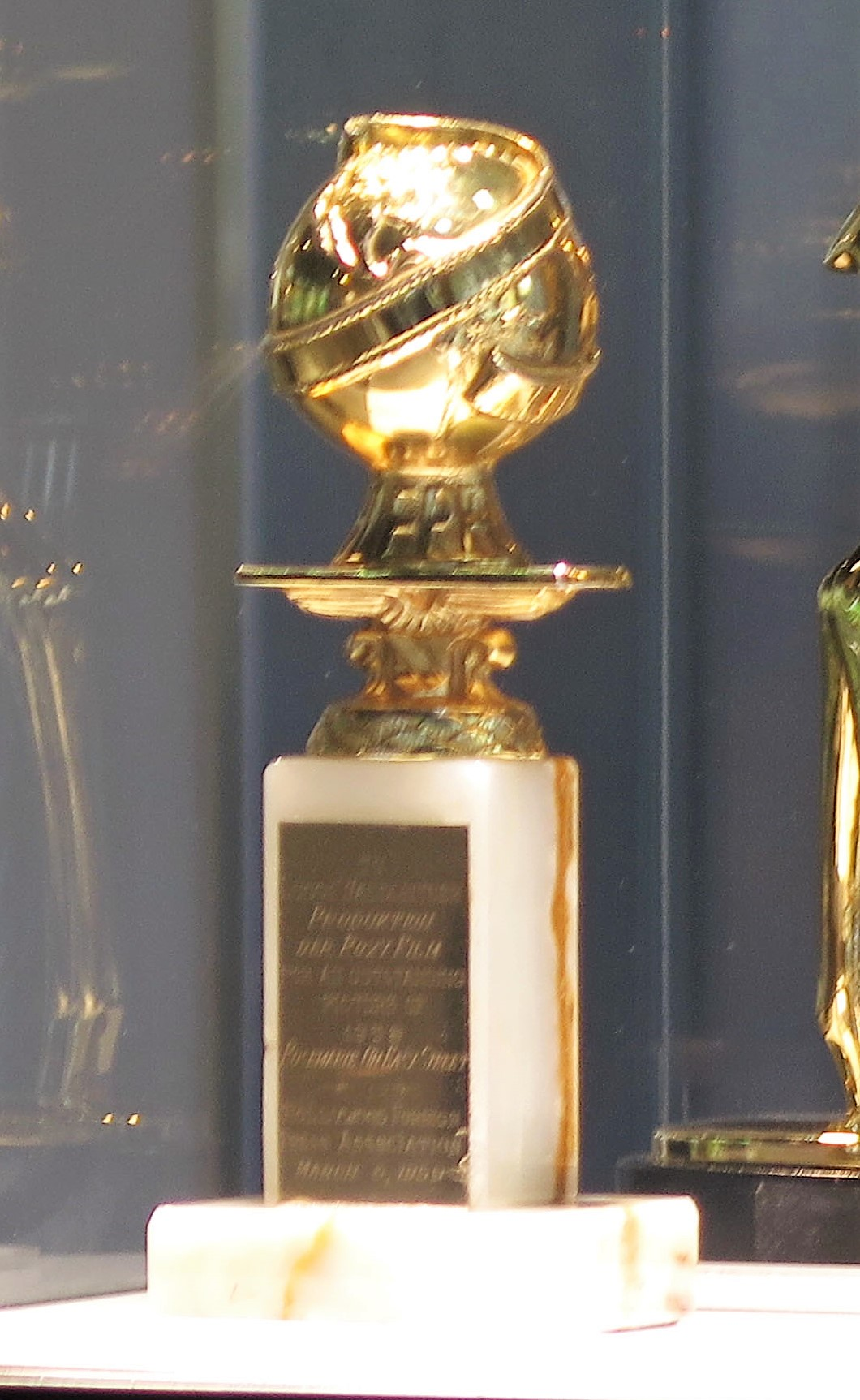
Golden Globe Award

The Golden Globe Award for Best Animated Feature Film is a Golden Globe Award category that was awarded for the first time at the 64th Golden Globe Awards in 2007. It was the first time that the Golden Globe Awards had created a separate category for animated films since its establishment. The nominations are announced in January and an awards ceremony is held later in the month. Initially, only three films were nominated for best animated film, in contrast to five nominations for the majority of other awards. The Pixar film Cars was the first recipient of the award.

== Eligibility ==
English-language films may be nominated in only one feature category. Therefore, films nominated in this category are ineligible to be nominated for Best Motion Picture – Musical or Comedy, Best Motion Picture – Drama if their principal dialogue is in English. However, films nominated for Best Foreign Language Film are eligible for Best Animated Feature; the only Golden Globe film awards for which they are ineligible are the aforementioned two Best Motion Picture awards. This has led to much confusion leading many to believe animated films are snubbed in the Best Motion Picture categories, specifically Best Motion Picture – Musical or Comedy where animated films have won and/or were nominated before, but in reality (since 2006) they simply are not eligible to be nominated; until 2023 prior of the now-defunct Hollywood Foreign Press Association, the rule is amended by Dick Clark Productions following controversies of splitting votes and snub between the main categories, which animated films are still allowed to be eligible in Comedy or Drama as well as Animated at the same time in similar vein to Golden Globe Award for Best Foreign Language Film and recently-established Cinematic and Box Office Achievement.

On November 17, 2009, the Hollywood Foreign Press Association announced that at the 67th Annual Golden Globe Awards, there will be five nominees for Best Animated Feature Film, as its members voted to amend its rules: eligible films must be feature-length (70 minutes or longer) with no more than 25% live action. If fewer than eight animated films qualify, the award will not be given, in which case the films would be eligible for Best Picture. If fewer than twelve animated films qualify, the category will be limited to three nominations per year.

== Winners and nominees ==
=== 2000s ===
Year	Film	Nominee(s)	Studio(s)
2006	Cars	John Lasseter	Walt Disney Pictures, Pixar Animation Studios
2006	Happy Feet	George Miller	Village Roadshow Pictures, Animal Logic, Kennedy Miller Productions, Warner Animation Group
2006	Monster House	Gil Kenan	ImageMovers, Amblin Entertainment, Relativity Media
2007	Ratatouille	Brad Bird	Walt Disney Pictures, Pixar Animation Studios
2007	Bee Movie	Simon J. Smith and Steve Hickner	DreamWorks Animation
2007	The Simpsons Movie	David Silverman	20th Century Fox Animation, Gracie Films
2008	WALL-E	Andrew Stanton	Walt Disney Pictures, Pixar Animation Studios
2008	Bolt	Chris Williams and Byron Howard	Walt Disney Pictures, Walt Disney Animation Studios
2008	Kung Fu Panda	Mark Osborne and John Stevenson	DreamWorks Animation
2009	Up	Pete Docter	Walt Disney Pictures, Pixar Animation Studios
2009	Cloudy with a Chance of Meatballs	Phil Lord and Christopher Miller	Sony Pictures Animation
2009	Coraline	Henry Selick	Laika, Pandemonium, Focus Features
2009	Fantastic Mr. Fox	Wes Anderson	20th Century Fox Animation, American Empirical Pictures, Regency Enterprises, Indian Paintbrush
2009	The Princess and the Frog	Ron Clements and John Musker	Walt Disney Pictures, Walt Disney Animation Studios

=== 2010s ===
Year	Film	Nominee(s)	Studio(s)
2010	Toy Story 3	Lee Unkrich	Walt Disney Pictures, Pixar Animation Studios
2010	Despicable Me	Pierre Coffin and Chris Renaud	Illumination Entertainment
2010	How to Train Your Dragon	Chris Sanders and Dean DeBlois	DreamWorks Animation
2010	The Illusionist	Sylvain Chomet	Pathé, Django Films
2010	Tangled	Nathan Greno and Byron Howard	Walt Disney Pictures, Walt Disney Animation Studios
2011	The Adventures of Tintin	Steven Spielberg	Nickelodeon Movies, Amblin Entertainment, WingNut Films, The Kennedy/Marshall Company, Weta Digital, Hemisphere Media
2011	Arthur Christmas	Sarah Smith	Aardman Animations, Sony Pictures Animation
2011	Cars 2	John Lasseter	Walt Disney Pictures, Pixar Animation Studios
2011	Puss in Boots	Chris Miller	DreamWorks Animation
2011	Rango	Gore Verbinski	Nickelodeon Movies, GK Films, Industrial Light & Magic
2012	Brave	Mark Andrews and Brenda Chapman	Walt Disney Pictures, Pixar Animation Studios
2012	Frankenweenie	Tim Burton	Walt Disney Pictures, Tim Burton Productions
2012	Hotel Transylvania	Genndy Tartakovsky	Sony Pictures Animation
2012	Rise of the Guardians	Peter Ramsey	DreamWorks Animation
2012	Wreck-It Ralph	Rich Moore	Walt Disney Pictures, Walt Disney Animation Studios
2013	Frozen	Chris Buck and Jennifer Lee	Walt Disney Pictures, Walt Disney Animation Studios
2013	The Croods	Kirk DeMicco and Chris Sanders	DreamWorks Animation
2013	Despicable Me 2	Pierre Coffin and Chris Renaud	Illumination Entertainment
2014	How to Train Your Dragon 2	Dean DeBlois	DreamWorks Animation
2014	Big Hero 6	Don Hall and Chris Williams	Walt Disney Pictures, Walt Disney Animation Studios
2014	The Book of Life	Jorge Gutierrez	Reel FX Creative Studios, 20th Century Fox Animation
2014	The Boxtrolls	Graham Annable and Anthony Stacchi	Laika, Focus Features
2014	The Lego Movie	Phil Lord and Christopher Miller	Village Roadshow Pictures, Lego System A/S, Vertigo Entertainment, Lin Pictures, Animal Logic, Warner Animation Group
2015	Inside Out	Pete Docter	Walt Disney Pictures, Pixar Animation Studios
2015	Anomalisa	Charlie Kaufman and Duke Johnson	Starburns Industries, Snoot Films, Paramount Animation
2015	The Good Dinosaur	Peter Sohn	Walt Disney Pictures, Pixar Animation Studios
2015	The Peanuts Movie	Steve Martino	Blue Sky Studios, 20th Century Fox Animation, Peanuts Worldwide, Feigco Entertainment
2015	Shaun the Sheep Movie	Richard Starzak and Mark Burton	Aardman Animations
2016	Zootopia	Byron Howard and Rich Moore	Walt Disney Pictures, Walt Disney Animation Studios
2016	Kubo and the Two Strings	Travis Knight	Laika, Focus Features
2016	Moana	Ron Clements and John Musker	Walt Disney Pictures, Walt Disney Animation Studios
2016	My Life as a Zucchini	Claude Barras	Rhône-Alpes Studios
2016	Sing	Garth Jennings	Illumination Entertainment
2017	Coco	Lee Unkrich	Walt Disney Pictures, Pixar Animation Studios
2017	The Boss Baby	Tom McGrath	DreamWorks Animation
2017	The Breadwinner	Nora Twomey	Cartoon Saloon, Telefilm Canada, Irish Film Board, Melusine Productions, Jolie Pas, Guru Studio, Aircraft Pictures
2017	Ferdinand	Carlos Saldanha	Blue Sky Studios, 20th Century Fox Animation, Davis Entertainment
2017	Loving Vincent	Dorota Kobiela and Hugh Welchman	BreakThru Productions, Trademark Films
2018	Spider-Man: Into the Spider-Verse	Bob Persichetti, Peter Ramsey and Rodney Rothman	Columbia Pictures, Marvel Entertainment, Sony Pictures Animation
2018	Incredibles 2	Brad Bird	Walt Disney Pictures, Pixar Animation Studios
2018	Isle of Dogs	Wes Anderson	Studio Babelsberg, Indian Paintbrush, American Empirical Pictures
2018	Mirai	Mamoru Hosoda	Studio Chizu
2018	Ralph Breaks the Internet	Rich Moore and Phil Johnston	Walt Disney Pictures, Walt Disney Animation Studios
2019	Missing Link	Chris Butler	Annapurna Pictures, Laika
2019	Frozen 2	Chris Buck and Jennifer Lee	Walt Disney Pictures, Walt Disney Animation Studios
2019	How to Train Your Dragon: The Hidden World	Dean DeBlois	DreamWorks Animation
2019	The Lion King	Jon Favreau	Walt Disney Pictures, Fairview Entertainment
2019	Toy Story 4	Josh Cooley	Walt Disney Pictures, Pixar Animation Studios

=== 2020s ===
Year	Film	Nominee(s)	Studio(s)
2020	Soul	Pete Docter	Walt Disney Pictures, Pixar Animation Studios
2020	The Croods: A New Age	Joel Crawford	DreamWorks Animation
2020	Onward	Dan Scanlon	Walt Disney Pictures, Pixar Animation Studios
2020	Over the Moon	Glen Keane	Netflix (Netflix Animation), Pearl Studio, Sony Pictures Imageworks, Glen Keane Productions
2020	Wolfwalkers	Tomm Moore and Ross Stewart	Cartoon Saloon, Melusine Productions
2021	Encanto	Jared Bush and Byron Howard	Walt Disney Pictures, Walt Disney Animation Studios
2021	Flee	Jonas Poher Rasmussen	Vice Studios, NEON
2021	Luca	Enrico Casarosa	Walt Disney Pictures, Pixar Animation Studios
2021	My Sunny Maad	Michaela Pavlátová	Negativ Film, Sacrebleu Productions
2021	Raya and the Last Dragon	Don Hall and Carlos López Estrada	Walt Disney Pictures, Walt Disney Animation Studios
2022	Guillermo del Toro's Pinocchio	Guillermo del Toro and Mark Gustafson	Netflix (Netflix Animation), Double Dare You!, ShadowMachine, The Jim Henson Company, Taller del Chucho
2022	Inu-Oh	Masaaki Yuasa	Science Saru
2022	Marcel the Shell with Shoes On	Dean Fleischer Camp	Cinereach, You Want I Should LLC., Human Woman Inc., Sunbeam TV & Films, Chiodo Bros. Productions, A24
2022	Puss in Boots: The Last Wish	Joel Crawford	DreamWorks Animation
2022	Turning Red	Domee Shi	Walt Disney Pictures, Pixar Animation Studios
2023	The Boy and the Heron	Hayao Miyazaki	Studio Ghibli, GKIDS
2023	Elemental	Peter Sohn	Walt Disney Pictures, Pixar Animation Studios
2023	Spider-Man: Across the Spider-Verse	Joaquim Dos Santos, Kemp Powers and Justin K. Thompson	Columbia Pictures, Marvel Entertainment, Sony Pictures Animation
2023	The Super Mario Bros. Movie	Aaron Horvath and Michael Jelenic	Universal Pictures, Illumination, Nintendo
2023	Suzume	Makoto Shinkai	CoMix Wave Films, Studio, Inc., Toho
2023	Wish	Chris Buck and Fawn Veerasunthorn	Walt Disney Pictures, Walt Disney Animation Studios
2024	Flow	Gints Zilbalodis	Janus Films, Sacrebleu Productions
2024	Inside Out 2	Kelsey Mann	Walt Disney Pictures, Pixar Animation Studios
2024	Memoir of a Snail	Adam Elliot	IFC Films, Snails Pace Films
2024	Moana 2	David Derrick Jr., Jason Hand and Dana Ledoux Miller	Walt Disney Pictures, Walt Disney Animation Studios
2024	Wallace & Gromit: Vengeance Most Fowl	Nick Park and Merlin Crossingham	Aardman Animations, Netflix
2024	The Wild Robot	Chris Sanders	DreamWorks Animation
2025	KPop Demon Hunters	Maggie Kang and Chris Appelhans	Sony Pictures Animation, Netflix
2025	Arco	Ugo Bienvenu	Fit Via Vi Film Productions, NEON
2025	Demon Slayer: Kimetsu no Yaiba – The Movie: Infinity Castle	Haruo Sotozaki	Toho, Crunchyroll
2025	Elio	Madeline Sharafian, Domee Shi, and Adrian Molina	Pixar Animation Studios
2025	Little Amélie or the Character of Rain	Maïlys Vallade and Liane-Cho Han	Ikki Films
2025	Zootopia 2	Jared Bush and Byron Howard	Walt Disney Animation Studios

== Breakdown ==
- Pixar Animation Studios - 9 wins, 19 nominations
- Walt Disney Animation Studios - 3 wins, 15 nominations
- Sony Pictures Animation - 2 wins, 7 nominations
- DreamWorks Animation - 1 win, 13 nominations
- Laika - 1 win, 4 nominations
- Nickelodeon Movies - 1 win, 2 nominations
- Netflix - 1 win, 3 nominations
- Sacrebleu Productions - 1 win, 2 nominations
- Studio Ghibli - 1 win, 1 nomination
- Illumination Entertainment - no wins, 4 nominations
- Aardman Animations - no wins, 3 nominations
- Blue Sky Studios - no wins, 2 nominations
- Warner Bros. Pictures - no wins, 2 nominations
- Cartoon Saloon - no wins, 2 nominations
- Indian Paintbrush/American Empirical Pictures - no wins, 2 nominations
- Melusine Productions - no wins, 2 nominations

== See also ==
- BAFTA Award for Best Animated Film
- Annie Award for Best Animated Feature
- Annie Award for Best Animated Feature — Independent
- Academy Award for Best Animated Feature
- Japan Media Arts Festival
- Animation Kobe
- Tokyo Anime Award
- Saturn Award for Best Animated Film
- List of submissions for the Academy Award for Best Animated Feature
