= List of accolades received by Spider-Man: Across the Spider-Verse =

Spider-Man: Across the Spider-Verse accolades
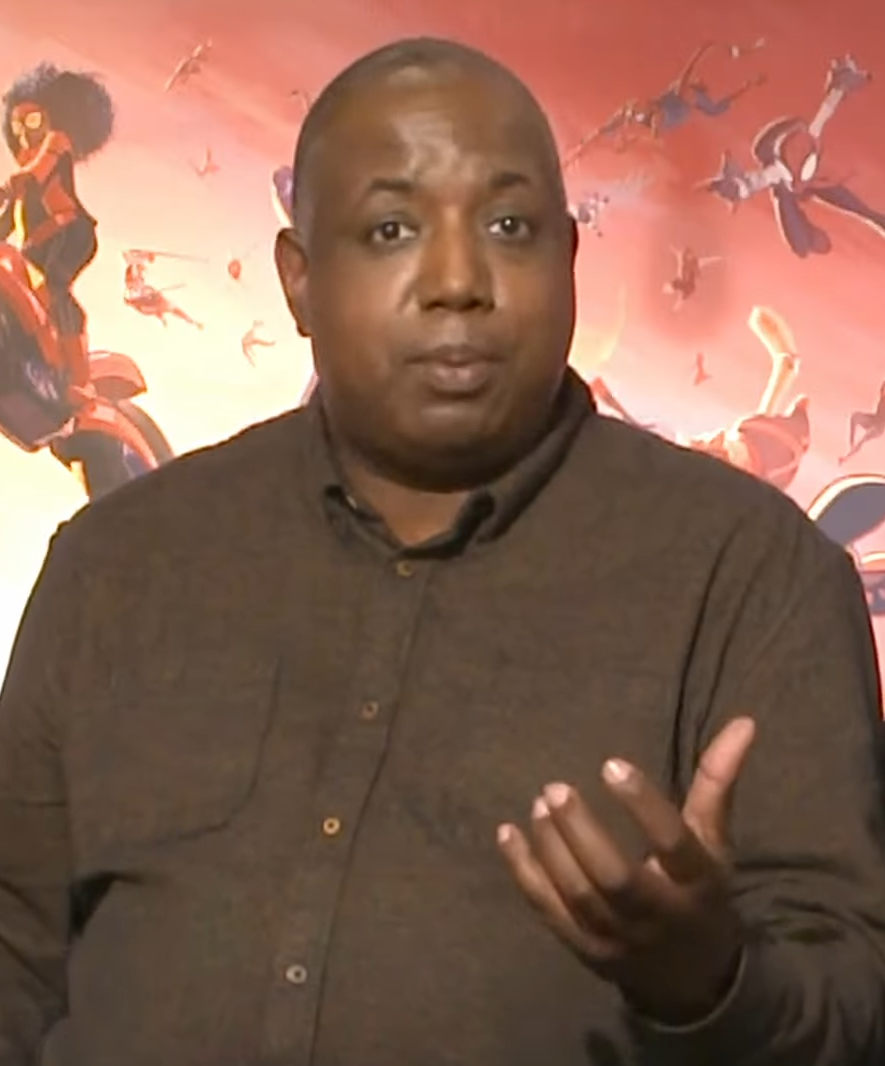
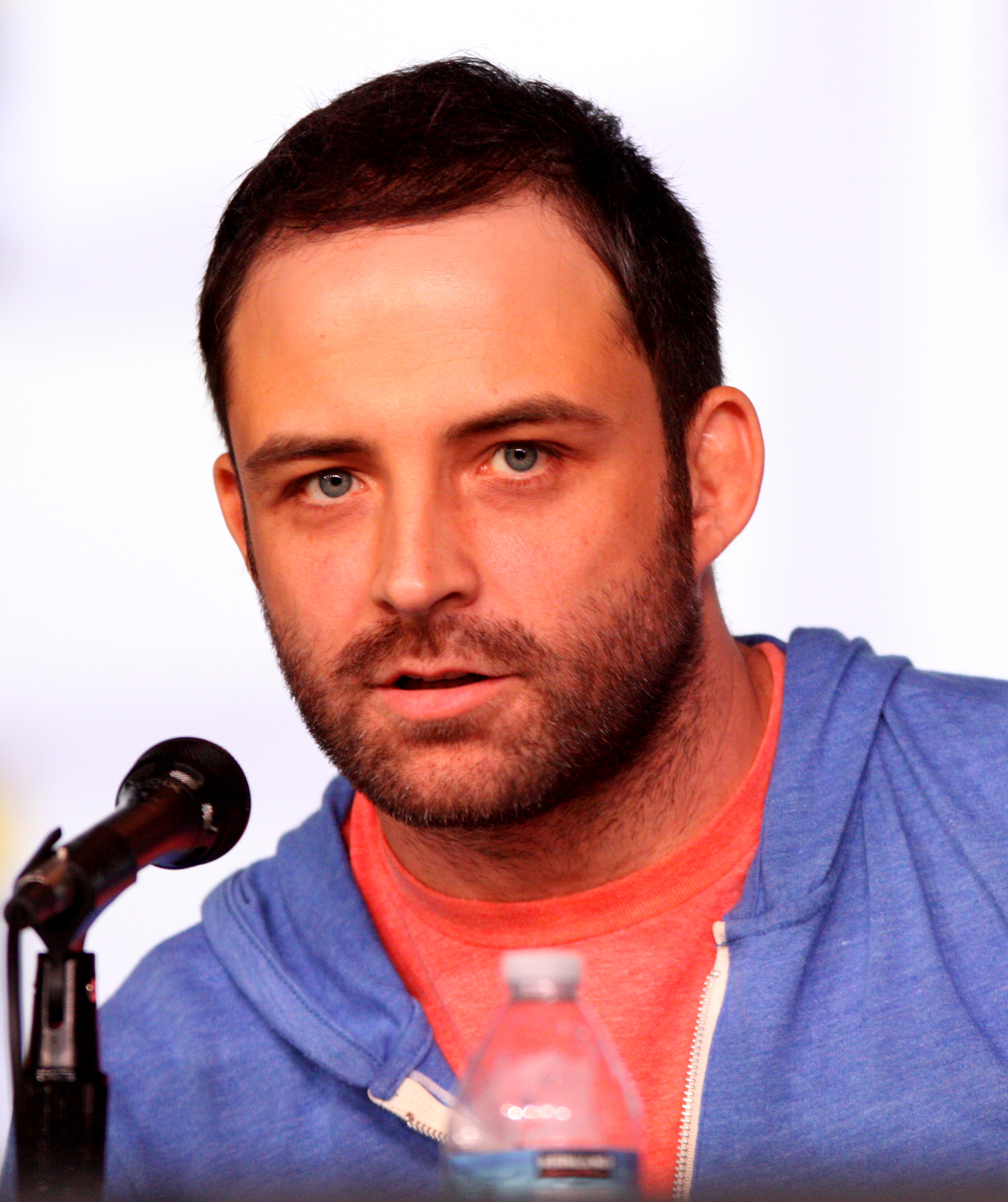
- Kemp Powers (left), Joaquim Dos Santos (middle) and Justin K. Thompson (right) received multiple accolades for co-directing the film.
Awards and nominations
Award	Wins	Nominations
Academy Awards	0	1
Advanced Imaging Society Lumiere Awards	1	1
African-American Film Critics Association Awards	2	2
Alliance of Women Film Journalists EDA Awards	1	2
American Cinema Editors Eddie Awards	1	1
American Film Institute Awards	1	1
Annie Awards	7	7
Art Directors Guild Awards	1	1
Artios Awards	1	1
Astra Creative Arts Awards	1	4
Astra Film Awards	2	6
Austin Film Critics Association Awards	2	5
BET Awards	0	1
Billboard Music Awards	0	1
Black Film Critics Circle	2	2
Black Reel Awards	2	8
Boston Society of Film Critics Awards	1	1
British Academy Film Awards	0	2
British Film Editors Awards	1	1
Capri Hollywood International Film Festival Awards	1	1
Chicago Film Critics Association Awards	0	1
Chinese American Film Festival Awards	1	1
Cinema Audio Society Awards	1	1
Critics' Choice Celebration of Cinema and Television Awards	1	1
Critics' Choice Movie Awards	1	3
Critics' Choice Super Awards	1	3
Dallas–Fort Worth Film Critics Association Awards	1	1
Denver Film Festival Awards	1	1
Dorian Awards	0	2
Florida Film Critics Circle Awards	0	3
Georgia Film Critics Association Awards	2	4
Golden Globe Awards	0	3
Gold List Awards	1	1
Golden Reel Awards	1	2
Golden Trailer Awards	1	2
Guild of Music Supervisors Awards	0	2
Harvey Awards	1	1
Hollywood Critics Association Midseason Awards	2	3
Hollywood Music in Media Awards	1	3
Hollywood Professional Association Awards	1	2
Houston Film Critics Society Awards	1	2
Hugo Awards	0	1
ICG Publicists Awards	0	1
Imagen Awards	2	2
International Cinephile Society Awards	0	1
International Film Music Critics Association Awards	0	1
Ivor Novello Awards	0	1
Kansas City Film Critics Circle Awards	2	2
London Film Critics' Circle Awards	0	1
Movieguide Awards	0	1
MTV MIAW Awards	0	1
NAACP Image Awards	2	6
National Board of Review Awards	1	1
New York Film Critics Online Awards	2	2
Nickelodeon Kids' Choice Awards	1	3
Online Film Critics Society Awards	1	2
Paris Film Critics Association Awards	0	1
People's Choice Awards	0	1
Producers Guild of America Awards	1	1
Ray Bradbury Award	0	1
San Diego Film Critics Society Awards	1	1
San Francisco Bay Area Film Critics Circle Awards	0	2
Santa Barbara International Film Festival Awards	1	1
Satellite Awards	0	3
Saturn Awards	1	2
Seattle Film Critics Society Awards	1	4
St. Louis Film Critics Association Awards	1	3
Toronto Film Critics Association Awards	1	1
Visual Effects Society Awards	4	7
Washington D.C. Area Film Critics Association Awards	2	5
Women Film Critics Circle Awards	1	1
World Soundtrack Awards	0	1

Totals (Note: Certain award groups do not simply award one winner. They acknowledge several different recipients, have runners-up, and have third place. Since this is a specific recognition and is different from losing an award, runner-up mentions are considered wins in this award tally. For simplification and to avoid errors, each award in this list has been presumed to have had a prior nomination.)
- Wins: 67
- Nominations: 149

Spider-Man: Across the Spider-Verse is a 2023 American animated superhero film produced by Columbia Pictures and Sony Pictures Animation in association with Marvel Entertainment, and distributed by Sony Pictures Releasing. The film was co-directed by Joaquim Dos Santos, Kemp Powers, and Justin K. Thompson from a screenplay by Phil Lord, Christopher Miller, and David Callaham. It is the sequel to Spider-Man: Into the Spider-Verse (2018) and the second film in the Spider-Verse franchise, which is set in a shared multiverse of alternate universes called the "Spider-Verse". Spider-Man: Across the Spider-Verse follows Miles Morales (voiced by Shameik Moore) as he goes on an adventure across the multiverse with Gwen Stacy / Spider-Woman (voiced by Hailee Steinfeld), where he meets the Spider-Society, a team of Spider-People led by Miguel O'Hara / Spider-Man 2099 (voiced by Oscar Issac), but comes into conflict with them over how to handle the threat of the Spot (voiced by Jason Schwartzman). The voice cast also features Brian Tyree Henry, Lauren Vélez, Jake Johnson, Issa Rae, Karan Soni, Shea Whigham, Greta Lee, Daniel Kaluuya, and Mahershala Ali, among others.

Spider-Man: Across the Spider-Verse premiered at the Regency Village Theatre in Los Angeles on May 30, 2023, and was released theatrically in the United States on June 2, and in most other territories in June. Produced on a budget of $100–150 million, the film grossed $690.9 million worldwide during its original theatrical run, becoming the sixth-highest-grossing film of 2023. Like its predecessor, Spider-Man: Into the Spider-Verse was released to widespread critical acclaim, with particular praise directed towards its animation, visual styles and effects, (Note: Spider-Man: Across the Spider-Verse had six different visual styles, one for each of the universes visited by the characters.) as well as Daniel Pemberton's score and the voice ensemble. (Note: Attributed to multiple sources:) On the review aggregator website Rotten Tomatoes, the film holds an approval rating of 95% based on 385 reviews.

Spider-Man: Across the Spider-Verse garnered awards and nominations in various categories with particular recognition for its voice acting, musical score and visual effects. At the 96th Academy Awards, it was nominated for Best Animated Feature, while at the 77th British Academy Film Awards, it earned nominations for Best Animated Film and Best Original Music. The film received three nominations at the 29th Critics' Choice Awards, winning Best Animated Feature, and a further three nominations at the 81st Golden Globe Awards. Like its predecessor, the film garnered seven nominations at the 51st Annie Awards, including Best Animated Feature and Outstanding Achievement for Directing in an Animated Feature Production, and won in all of its categories. It also won Best Animated Film at the 95th National Board of Review Awards. In addition, the American Film Institute named Across the Spider-Verse one of the Top 10 Films of the Year.

== Accolades ==
Accolades received by Spider-Man: Across the Spider-Verse
Award	Date of ceremony	Category	Recipient(s)	Result	Ref.
Academy Awards	March 10, 2024	Best Animated Feature	Kemp Powers, Justin K. Thompson, Phil Lord, Christopher Miller and Amy Pascal	Nominated	
Advanced Imaging Society Lumiere Awards	February 9, 2024	Best Feature Film - Animated	Spider-Man: Across the Spider-Verse	Won	
African-American Film Critics Association	January 15, 2024	Top 10 Films of the Year	Spider-Man: Across the Spider-Verse	6th Place	
African-American Film Critics Association	January 15, 2024	Best Animated Feature	Spider-Man: Across the Spider-Verse	Won	
Alliance of Women Film Journalists EDA Awards	January 3, 2024	Best Animated Film	Spider-Man: Across the Spider-Verse	Nominated	
Alliance of Women Film Journalists EDA Awards	January 3, 2024	Best Animated Female	Hailee Steinfeld	Won	
American Cinema Editors Eddie Awards	March 3, 2024	Best Edited Animated Feature Film (Theatrical or Non-Theatrical)	Michael Andrews	Won	
American Film Institute Awards	December 7, 2023	Top 10 Films of the Year	Spider-Man: Across the Spider-Verse	Won (Note: This award does not have a single winner, but recognizes multiple films.)	
Annie Awards	February 17, 2024	Best Animated Feature	Spider-Man: Across the Spider-Verse	Won	
Annie Awards	February 17, 2024	Outstanding Achievement for Animated Effects in an Animated Production	Pav Grochola, Filippo Maccari, Naoki Kato, Nicola Finizio and Edmond Boulet-Gilly	Won	
Annie Awards	February 17, 2024	Outstanding Achievement for Character Design in an Animated Feature Production	Jesús Alonso Iglesias	Won	
Annie Awards	February 17, 2024	Outstanding Achievement for Directing in a Feature Production	Joaquim Dos Santos, Kemp Powers, and Justin K. Thompson	Won	
Annie Awards	February 17, 2024	Outstanding Achievement for Editorial in an Animated Feature Production	Spider-Man: Across the Spider-Verse Editorial Team	Won	
Annie Awards	February 17, 2024	Outstanding Achievement for Music in a Feature Production	Daniel Pemberton and Metro Boomin	Won	
Annie Awards	February 17, 2024	Outstanding Achievement for Production Design in an Animated Feature Production	Patrick O'Keefe and Dean Gordon	Won	
Art Directors Guild Awards	February 10, 2024	Excellence in Production Design for an Animated Film	Patrick O'Keefe	Won	
Artios Awards	March 7, 2024	Outstanding Achievement in Casting – Feature Animation	Mary Hidalgo	Won	
Astra Creative Arts Awards	February 26, 2024	Best Sound	Spider-Man: Across the Spider-Verse	Nominated	
Astra Creative Arts Awards	February 26, 2024	Best Visual Effects	Spider-Man: Across the Spider-Verse	Won	
Astra Creative Arts Awards	February 26, 2024	Best Editing	Michael Andrews	Nominated	
Astra Creative Arts Awards	February 26, 2024	Best Score	Daniel Pemberton	Nominated	
Astra Film Awards	January 6, 2024	Best Picture	Spider-Man: Across the Spider-Verse	Nominated	
Astra Film Awards	January 6, 2024	Best Voice-Over Performance	Daniel Kaluuya	Nominated	
Astra Film Awards	January 6, 2024	Best Voice-Over Performance	Shameik Moore	Nominated	
Astra Film Awards	January 6, 2024	Best Voice-Over Performance	Hailee Steinfeld	Won	
Astra Film Awards	January 6, 2024	Best Adapted Screenplay	Phil Lord, Christopher Miller, and David Callaham	Nominated	
Astra Film Awards	January 6, 2024	Best Animated Feature	Spider-Man: Across the Spider-Verse	Won	
Austin Film Critics Association Awards	January 10, 2024	Best Film	Spider-Man: Across the Spider-Verse	8th Place	
Austin Film Critics Association Awards	January 10, 2024	Best Animated Film	Spider-Man: Across the Spider-Verse	Won	
Austin Film Critics Association Awards	January 10, 2024	Best Original Score	Daniel Pemberton	Nominated	
Austin Film Critics Association Awards	January 10, 2024	Best Voice Acting/Animated/Digital Performance	Shameik Moore	Nominated	
Austin Film Critics Association Awards	January 10, 2024	Best Voice Acting/Animated/Digital Performance	Hailee Steinfeld	Nominated	
BET Awards	June 30, 2024	Best Movie	Spider-Man: Across the Spider-Verse	Nominated	
Billboard Music Awards	November 19, 2023	Top Soundtrack	Metro Boomin Presents Spider-Man: Across the Spider-Verse (Soundtrack from and Inspired by the Motion Picture)	Nominated	
Black Reel Awards	January 16, 2024	Outstanding Film	Spider-Man: Across the Spider-Verse	Nominated	
Black Reel Awards	January 16, 2024	Outstanding Voice Performance	Shameik Moore	Won	
Black Reel Awards	January 16, 2024	Outstanding Voice Performance	Brian Tyree Henry	Nominated	
Black Reel Awards	January 16, 2024	Outstanding Voice Performance	Daniel Kaluuya	Nominated	
Black Reel Awards	January 16, 2024	Outstanding Editing	Michael Andrews	Won	
Black Reel Awards	January 16, 2024	Outstanding Production Design	Patrick O'Keefe	Nominated	
Black Reel Awards	January 16, 2024	Outstanding Original Song	"Am I Dreaming" (Metro Boomin, ASAP Rocky and Roisee)	Nominated	
Black Reel Awards	January 16, 2024	Outstanding Soundtrack	Spider-Man: Across the Spider-Verse	Nominated	
Boston Society of Film Critics Awards	December 10, 2023	Best Animated Film	Spider-Man: Across the Spider-Verse	Runner-up (Note: Shared with Teenage Mutant Ninja Turtles: Mutant Mayhem, Robot Dreams, and The Peasants)	
British Academy Film Awards	February 18, 2024	Best Animated Film	Spider-Man: Across the Spider-Verse	Nominated	
British Academy Film Awards	February 18, 2024	Best Original Music	Daniel Pemberton	Nominated	
British Film Editors Awards	February 18, 2024	Best Edited Single Animation	Michael Andrews	Won	
Capri Hollywood International Film Festival Awards	January 2, 2024	Best Animated Feature	Spider-Man: Across the Spider-Verse	Won	
Chicago Film Critics Association Awards	December 12, 2023	Best Animated Film	Spider-Man: Across the Spider-Verse	Nominated	
Chinese American Film Festival Awards	November 11, 2023	Most Popular U.S. Film in China	Spider-Man: Across the Spider-Verse	Won	
Cinema Audio Society Awards	March 2, 2024	Outstanding Achievement in Sound Mixing for Motion Picture – Animated	Brian Smith, Aaron Hasson, Howard London, Michael Semanick, Juan Peralta, Sam Okell and Randy K. Singer	Won	
Critics' Choice Celebration of Cinema and Television Awards	December 4, 2023	Animation Award	Kemp Powers	Won	
Critics' Choice Movie Awards	January 14, 2024	Best Animated Feature	Spider-Man: Across the Spider-Verse	Won	
Critics' Choice Movie Awards	January 14, 2024	Best Score	Daniel Pemberton	Nominated	
Critics' Choice Movie Awards	January 14, 2024	Best Visual Effects	Spider-Man: Across the Spider-Verse	Nominated	
Critics' Choice Super Awards	April 4, 2024	Best Superhero Movie	Spider-Man: Across the Spider-Verse	Won	
Critics' Choice Super Awards	April 4, 2024	Best Actor in a Superhero Movie	Shameik Moore	Nominated	
Critics' Choice Super Awards	April 4, 2024	Best Actress in a Superhero Movie	Hailee Steinfeld	Nominated	
Dallas–Fort Worth Film Critics Association	December 18, 2023	Best Animated Film	Spider-Man: Across the Spider-Verse	Runner-up	
Denver Film Festival Awards	November 7, 2023	5280 Award	Phil Lord, Christopher Miller, Bob Persichetti, Christina Steinberg and Humberto Rosa	Won	
Dorian Awards	February 26, 2024	Animated Film of the Year	Spider-Man: Across the Spider-Verse	Nominated	
Dorian Awards	February 26, 2024	Visually Striking Film of the Year	Spider-Man: Across the Spider-Verse	Nominated	
Florida Film Critics Circle Awards	December 21, 2023	Best Animated Film	Spider-Man: Across the Spider-Verse	Nominated	
Florida Film Critics Circle Awards	December 21, 2023	Best Score	Daniel Pemberton	Nominated	
Florida Film Critics Circle Awards	December 21, 2023	Best Visual Effects	Spider-Man: Across the Spider-Verse	Nominated	
Georgia Film Critics Association Awards	January 5, 2024	Best Picture	Spider-Man: Across the Spider-Verse	Nominated	
Georgia Film Critics Association Awards	January 5, 2024	Best Original Score	Daniel Pemberton	Runner-up	
Georgia Film Critics Association Awards	January 5, 2024	Best Original Song	"Am I Dreaming" (Mike Dean, Peter Lee Johnson, ASAP Rocky, Roisee, Landon Wayne, and Metro Boomin)	Nominated	
Georgia Film Critics Association Awards	January 5, 2024	Best Animated Film	Spider-Man: Across the Spider-Verse	Won	
Golden Globe Awards	January 7, 2024	Best Animated Feature Film	Spider-Man: Across the Spider-Verse	Nominated	
Golden Globe Awards	January 7, 2024	Cinematic and Box Office Achievement	Spider-Man: Across the Spider-Verse	Nominated	
Golden Globe Awards	January 7, 2024	Best Original Score	Daniel Pemberton	Nominated	
Gold List Awards	January 10, 2024	Best Adapted Screenplay	David Callaham, Phil Lord and Christopher Miller	Won	
Golden Reel Awards	March 3, 2024	Outstanding Achievement in Sound Editing – Feature Animation	Geoffrey G. Rubay, John J. Pospisil, Alec G. Rubay, Kip Smedley, Cathryn Wang, David Werntz, Bruce Tanis, Greg ten Bosch, Daniel McNamara, Will Digby, Andy Sisul, James Morioka, Robert Getty, Jason W. Freeman, Kai Scheer, Ashley N. Rubay, Colin Lechner, Gregg Barbanell, Jeff Wilhoit, Dylan Wilhoit, Katie Greathouse and Barbara McDermott	Won	
Golden Reel Awards	March 3, 2024	Outstanding Achievement in Music Editing – Feature Motion Picture	Katie Greathouse and Barbara McDermott	Nominated	
Golden Trailer Awards	June 29, 2023	Best Animation/Family	Sony Pictures Animation and MOCEAN/TRANSIT	Won	
Golden Trailer Awards	May 30, 2024	Best Animation/Family	Sony Pictures Animation and TRANSIT (for "Choice")	Nominated	
Guild of Music Supervisors Awards	March 3, 2024	Best Music Supervision for Film Budgeted Over $25 Million	Kier Lehman	Nominated	
Guild of Music Supervisors Awards	March 3, 2024	Best Song Written and/or Recorded for a Film	"Am I Dreaming" (Mike Dean, Peter Lee Johnson, ASAP Rocky, Roisee, Landon Wayne, Metro Boomin, and Kier Lehman)	Nominated	
Harvey Awards	October 13, 2023	Best Adaptation from Comic Book/Graphic Novel	Spider-Man: Across the Spider-Verse	Won	
Hollywood Critics Association Midseason Awards	June 30, 2023	Best Director	Joaquim Dos Santos, Kemp Powers & Justin K. Thompson	Won	
Hollywood Critics Association Midseason Awards	June 30, 2023	Best Picture	Spider-Man: Across the Spider-Verse	Won	
Hollywood Critics Association Midseason Awards	June 30, 2023	Best Screenplay	Phil Lord, Christopher Miller, and David Callaham	Nominated	
Hollywood Music in Media Awards	November 15, 2023	Best Original Score — Animated Film	Daniel Pemberton	Won	
Hollywood Music in Media Awards	November 15, 2023	Best Original Song — Animated Film	"Am I Dreaming" (Mike Dean, Peter Lee Johnson, ASAP Rocky, Roisee, Landon Wayne, and Metro Boomin)	Nominated	
Hollywood Music in Media Awards	November 15, 2023	Best Soundtrack Album	Spider-Man: Across the Spider-Verse – Boominati Worldwide and Republic Records	Nominated	
Hollywood Professional Association Awards	November 28, 2023	Outstanding Color Grading – Animated Theatrical Feature	Natasha Leonnet (Picture Shop)	Won	
Hollywood Professional Association Awards	November 28, 2023	Outstanding Editing – Feature Film	Michael Andrews	Nominated	
Houston Film Critics Society Awards	January 22, 2024	Best Animated Feature	Spider-Man: Across the Spider-Verse	Won	
Houston Film Critics Society Awards	January 22, 2024	Best Original Score	Daniel Pemberton	Nominated	
Hugo Awards	August 11, 2024	Best Dramatic Presentation, Long Form	Spider-Man: Across the Spider-Verse	Nominated	
ICG Publicists Awards	March 8, 2024	Maxwell Weinberg Award for Motion Picture Publicity Campaign	Spider-Man: Across the Spider-Verse	Nominated	
Imagen Awards	September 8, 2024	Best Animated Feature Film	Spider-Man: Across the Spider-Verse	Won	
Imagen Awards	September 8, 2024	Best Voice-Over Actor - Feature Film	Lauren Velez	Won	
International Cinephile Society Awards	February 11, 2024	Best Animated Film	Spider-Man: Across the Spider-Verse	Nominated	
International Film Music Critics Association Awards	February 22, 2024	Best Original Score for an Animated Film	Daniel Pemberton	Nominated	
Ivor Novello Awards	May 23, 2024	Best Original Film Score	Daniel Pemberton	Nominated	
Kansas City Film Critics Circle Awards	January 27, 2024	Best Animated Feature	Spider-Man: Across the Spider-Verse	Won	
Kansas City Film Critics Circle Awards	January 27, 2024	Vince Koehler Award for the Best Science Fiction/Fantasy/Horror Film	Spider-Man: Across the Spider-Verse	Runner-up	
London Film Critics' Circle Awards	February 4, 2024	Animated Film of the Year	Spider-Man: Across the Spider-Verse	Nominated	
Movieguide Awards	February 9, 2024	Best Movies for Families	Spider-Man: Across the Spider-Verse	Nominated	
MTV MIAW Awards	August 6, 2023	Killer Series / Movie	Spider-Man: Across the Spider-Verse	Nominated	
NAACP Image Awards	March 16, 2024	Outstanding Animated Motion Picture	Spider-Man: Across the Spider-Verse	Won	
NAACP Image Awards	March 16, 2024	Outstanding Character Voice Performance – Motion Picture	Daniel Kaluuya	Nominated	
NAACP Image Awards	March 16, 2024	Outstanding Character Voice Performance – Motion Picture	Shameik Moore	Nominated	
NAACP Image Awards	March 16, 2024	Outstanding Character Voice Performance – Motion Picture	Issa Rae	Won	
NAACP Image Awards	March 16, 2024	Outstanding Character Voice Performance – Motion Picture	Brian Tyree Henry	Nominated	
NAACP Image Awards	March 16, 2024	Outstanding Soundtrack/Compilation Album	Metro Boomin Presents Spider-Man: Across the Spider-Verse (Soundtrack from and Inspired by the Motion Picture/Deluxe Edition) – Metro Boomin	Nominated	
National Board of Review Awards	December 6, 2023	Best Animated Feature	Spider-Man: Across the Spider-Verse	Won	
New York Film Critics Online Awards	December 15, 2023	Top 10 Films	Spider-Man: Across the Spider-Verse	Won	
New York Film Critics Online Awards	December 15, 2023	Best Animated Feature	Spider-Man: Across the Spider-Verse	Won	
Nickelodeon Kids' Choice Awards	July 13, 2024	Favorite Animated Movie	Spider-Man: Across the Spider-Verse	Won	
Nickelodeon Kids' Choice Awards	July 13, 2024	Favorite Male Voice from an Animated Movie	Shameik Moore (for "Miles Morales")	Nominated	
Nickelodeon Kids' Choice Awards	July 13, 2024	Favorite Female Voice from an Animated Movie	Hailee Steinfeld (for "Gwen Stacy")	Nominated	
Online Film Critics Society Awards	January 22, 2024	Best Animated Feature	Spider-Man: Across the Spider-Verse	Won	
Online Film Critics Society Awards	January 22, 2024	Best Original Score	Daniel Pemberton	Nominated	
Paris Film Critics Association Awards	February 4, 2024	Best Animated Film	Spider-Man: Across the Spider-Verse	Nominated	
People's Choice Awards	February 18, 2024	The Movie of the Year	Spider-Man: Across the Spider-Verse	Nominated	
Producers Guild of America Awards	February 25, 2024	Outstanding Producer of Animated Theatrical Motion Pictures	Spider-Man: Across the Spider-Verse	Won	
Nebula Awards	June 8, 2024	Ray Bradbury Award	Spider-Man: Across the Spider-Verse	Nominated	
San Diego Film Critics Society Awards	December 19, 2023	Best Animated Feature	Spider-Man: Across the Spider-Verse	Runner-up	
San Francisco Bay Area Film Critics Circle Awards	January 9, 2024	Best Animated Film	Spider-Man: Across the Spider-Verse	Nominated	
San Francisco Bay Area Film Critics Circle Awards	January 9, 2024	Best Original Score	Daniel Pemberton	Nominated	
Santa Barbara International Film Festival Awards	January 17, 2024	Variety Artisans Award	Michael Semanick	Won	
Satellite Awards	March 3, 2024	Best Animated or Mixed Media Feature	Spider-Man: Across the Spider-Verse	Nominated	
Satellite Awards	March 3, 2024	Best Original Score	Daniel Pemberton	Nominated	
Satellite Awards	March 3, 2024	Best Visual Effects	Bret St. Clair, Pav Grochola, Alan Hawkins and Michael Lasker	Nominated	
Saturn Awards	February 4, 2024	Best Animated Film	Spider-Man: Across the Spider-Verse	Won	
Saturn Awards	February 4, 2024	Best Music	Daniel Pemberton	Nominated	
Seattle Film Critics Society Awards	January 8, 2024	Best Picture of the Year	Spider-Man: Across the Spider-Verse	Nominated	
Seattle Film Critics Society Awards	January 8, 2024	Best Animated Feature	Spider-Man: Across the Spider-Verse	Won	
Seattle Film Critics Society Awards	January 8, 2024	Best Film Editing	Michael Andrews	Nominated	
Seattle Film Critics Society Awards	January 8, 2024	Best Original Score	Daniel Pemberton	Nominated	
St. Louis Film Critics Association Awards	December 17, 2023	Best Action Film	Spider-Man: Across the Spider-Verse	Nominated	
St. Louis Film Critics Association Awards	December 17, 2023	Best Animated Film	Spider-Man: Across the Spider-Verse	Won	
St. Louis Film Critics Association Awards	December 17, 2023	Best Score	Daniel Pemberton	Nominated	
Toronto Film Critics Association Awards	December 17, 2023	Best Animated Film	Spider-Man: Across the Spider-Verse	Runner-up (Note: Shared with The Boy and the Heron)	
Visual Effects Society Awards	February 21, 2024	Outstanding Visual Effects in an Animated Feature	Alan Hawkins, Christian Hejnal, Michael Lasker and Matt Hausman	Won	
Visual Effects Society Awards	February 21, 2024	Outstanding Animated Character in an Animated Feature	Christopher Mangnall, Craig Feifarek, Humberto Rosa and Nideep Varghese (for "Spot")	Won	
Visual Effects Society Awards	February 21, 2024	Outstanding Created Environment in an Animated Feature	Taehyun Park, YJ Lee, Pepe Orozco and Kelly Han (for "Mumbattan City")	Won	
Visual Effects Society Awards	February 21, 2024	Outstanding Effects Simulations in an Animated Feature	Pav Grochola, Filippo Maccari, Naoki Kato and Nicola Finizio	Won	
Visual Effects Society Awards	February 21, 2024	Outstanding Compositing and Lighting in a Feature	Bret St.Clair, Kieron Cheuk-Chi Lo, Kelly Christophers and Rowan Young	Nominated	
Visual Effects Society Awards	February 21, 2024	Outstanding Virtual Cinematography in a CG Project	Rich Turner, Randolph Lizarda, Daniela Campos Little and Thomas Campos	Nominated	
Visual Effects Society Awards	February 21, 2024	Outstanding Model in a Photoreal or Animated Project	Dongick David Sheen, Mark JeongWoong Lee, Mikaela Bantog and René Völker (for "Spider HQ")	Nominated	
Washington D.C. Area Film Critics Association Awards	December 10, 2023	Best Animated Feature	Spider-Man: Across the Spider-Verse	Won	
Washington D.C. Area Film Critics Association Awards	December 10, 2023	Best Score	Daniel Pemberton	Nominated	
Washington D.C. Area Film Critics Association Awards	December 10, 2023	Best Voice Performance	Daniel Kaluuya	Nominated	
Washington D.C. Area Film Critics Association Awards	December 10, 2023	Best Voice Performance	Shameik Moore	Won	
Washington D.C. Area Film Critics Association Awards	December 10, 2023	Best Voice Performance	Hailee Steinfeld	Nominated	
Women Film Critics Circle Awards	December 18, 2023	Best Animated Female	Hailee Steinfeld	Won	
World Soundtrack Awards	October 21, 2023	Film Composer of the Year	Daniel Pemberton (Note: Also for work on See How They Run, Enola Holmes 2, and Amsterdam)	Nominated	

== See also ==
- List of accolades received by Spider-Man: Into the Spider-Verse
