= List of accolades received by Spider-Man: Into the Spider-Verse =

Spider-Man: Into the Spider-Verse accolades
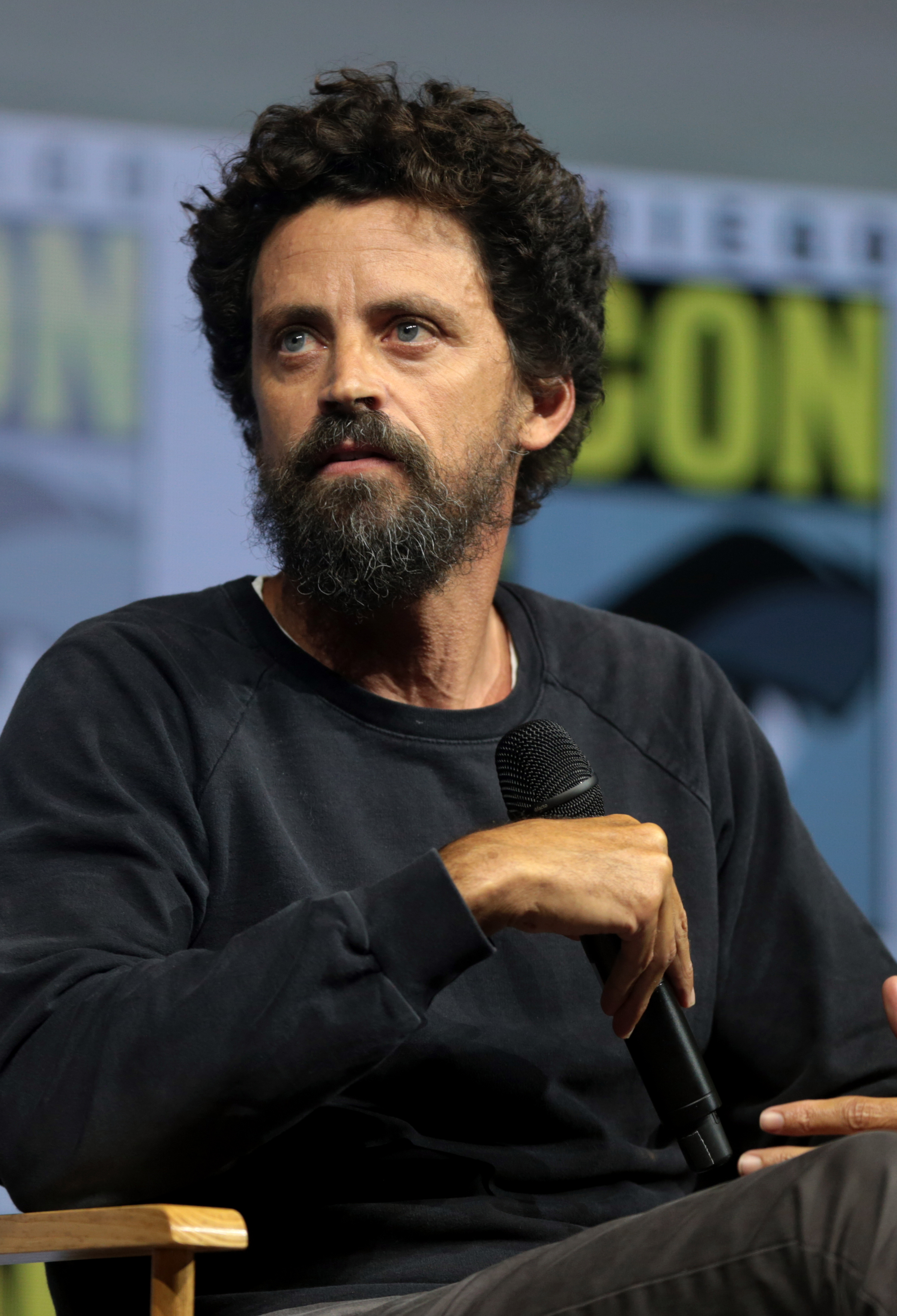
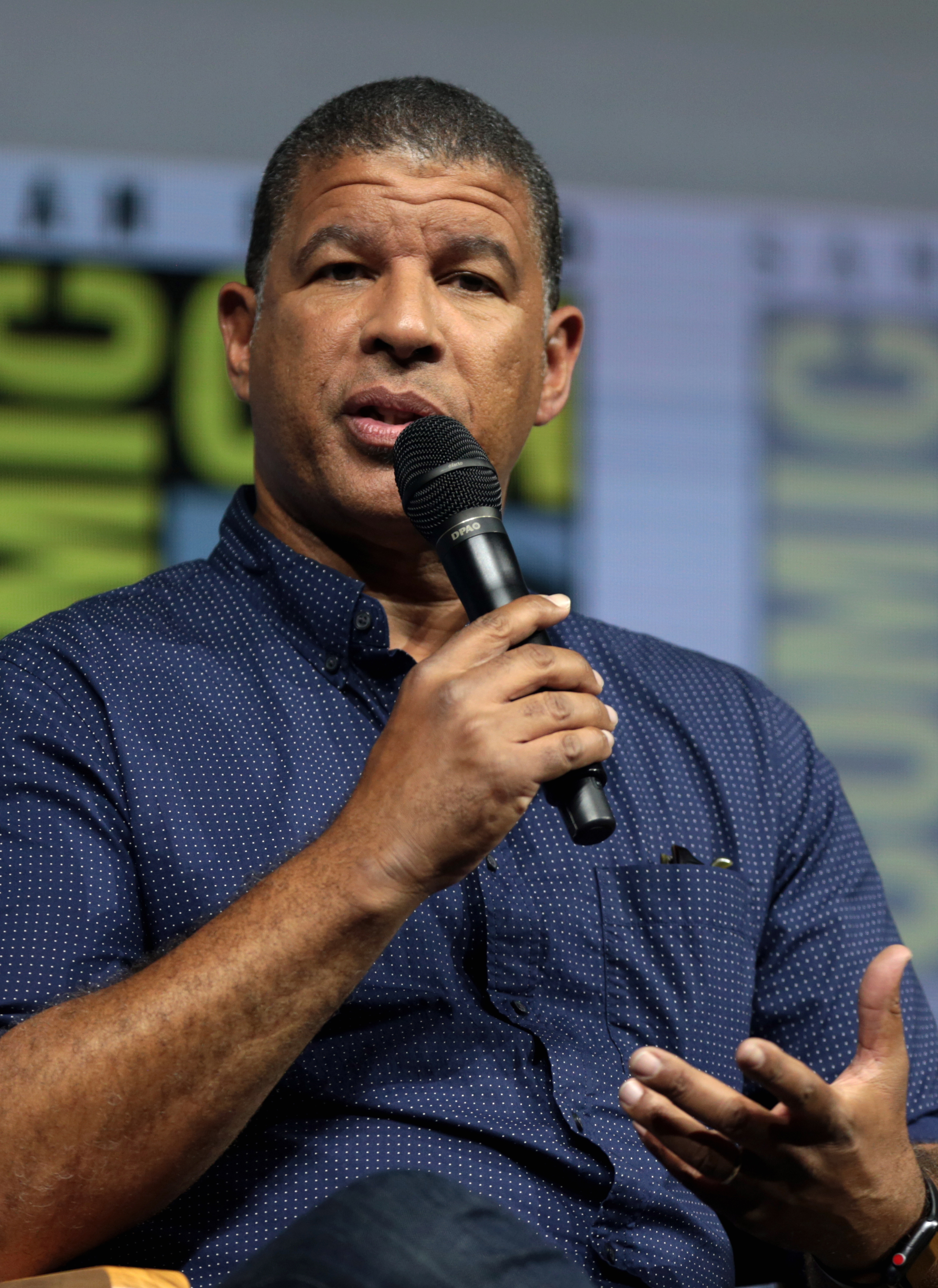
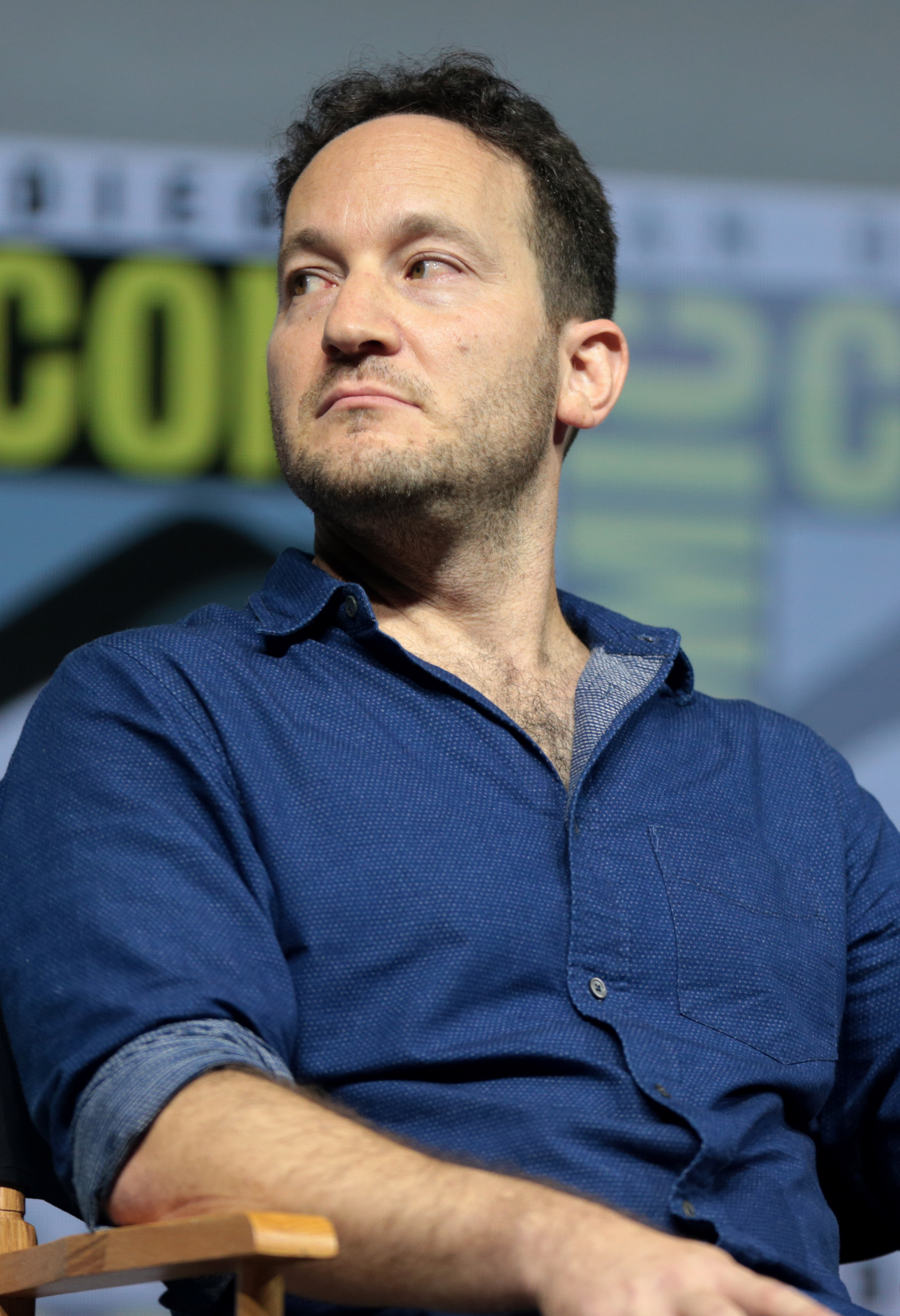
- Bob Persichetti (left), Peter Ramsey (middle) and Rodney Rothman (right) received multiple accolades for co-directing the film.
Awards and nominations
Award	Wins	Nominations
Academy Awards	1	1
Advanced Imaging Society Lumiere Awards	2	2
African-American Film Critics Association Awards	1	1
Alliance of Women Film Journalists EDA Awards	1	2
American Cinema Editors Eddie Awards	1	1
American Music Awards	0	3
Annie Awards	7	7
Art Directors Guild Awards	0	1
Austin Film Critics Association Awards	3	4
BET Awards	0	1
Black Reel Awards	1	3
Blue Ribbon Awards	0	1
British Academy Children's Awards	1	1
British Academy Film Awards	1	1
Chicago Film Critics Association Awards	1	1
Cinema Audio Society Awards	0	1
Critics' Choice Movie Awards	1	1
Dallas–Fort Worth Film Critics Association Awards	1	1
Detroit Film Critics Society Awards	1	1
Dragon Awards	0	1
Florida Film Critics Circle Awards	1	1
Georgia Film Critics Association Awards	1	1
Golden Globe Awards	1	1
Golden Raspberry Awards	0	1
Golden Reel Awards	2	2
Golden Trailer Awards	0	2
Grammy Awards	0	3
Guild of Music Supervisors Awards	1	2
Harvey Awards	1	1
Hollywood Professional Association Awards	1	1
Houston Film Critics Society Awards	0	1
Hugo Awards	1	1
ICG Publicists Awards	0	1
International Cinephile Society Awards	1	1
International Film Music Critics Association Awards	0	1
Ivor Novello Awards	0	1
Los Angeles Film Critics Association	1	1
Los Angeles Online Film Critics Society Awards	1	1
Movieguide Awards	0	1
MTV Movie & TV Awards	0	1
NAACP Image Awards	0	3
National Society of Film Critics Awards	1	1
Nebula Awards	1	1
New York Film Critics Circle Awards	1	1
New York Film Critics Online Awards	1	1
Nickelodeon Kids' Choice Awards	0	3
Online Film Critics Society Awards	1	1
Producers Guild of America Awards	1	1
Rondo Hatton Classic Horror Awards	1	1
San Diego Film Critics Society Awards	1	1
San Francisco Bay Area Film Critics Circle Awards	1	1
Saturn Awards	1	2
Seattle Film Critics Society Awards	1	1
St. Louis Film Critics Association Awards	1	1
SXSW Film Awards	1	1
Teen Choice Awards	0	2
Toronto Film Critics Association Awards	0	1
Visual Effects Society Awards	4	4
Washington D.C. Area Film Critics Association Awards	0	2
World Soundtrack Awards	0	2

Totals (Note: Certain award groups do not simply award one winner. They acknowledge several different recipients, have runners-up, and have third place. Since this is a specific recognition and is different from losing an award, runner-up mentions are considered wins in this award tally. For simplification and to avoid errors, each award in this list has been presumed to have had a prior nomination.)
- Wins: 52
- Nominations: 91

Spider-Man: Into the Spider-Verse is a 2018 American animated superhero film produced by Columbia Pictures and Sony Pictures Animation in association with Marvel Entertainment, and distributed by Sony Pictures Releasing. The film was co-directed by Bob Persichetti, Peter Ramsey, and Rodney Rothman from a screenplay by Phil Lord and Rothman. It is the first animated film in the Spider-Man franchise and the first film in the Spider-Verse franchise, which is set in a shared multiverse of alternate universes called the "Spider-Verse". Spider-Man: Into the Spider-Verse focuses on Miles Morales (voiced by Shameik Moore), an Afro-Latino teenager who becomes the new Spider-Man and teams up with Spider-People from various parallel universes to save New York City from Kingpin (voiced by Liev Schreiber). The voice cast also features Jake Johnson, Hailee Steinfeld, Mahershala Ali, Brian Tyree Henry, Nicolas Cage, John Mulaney, Lily Tomlin, Kimiko Glenn and Kathryn Hahn, among others.

Spider-Man: Into the Spider-Verse premiered at the Regency Village Theatre in Los Angeles on December 1, 2018, and was released theatrically in most territories between December 12 and December 14. Produced on a budget of $90 million, the film grossed $375 million worldwide during its original theatrical run. A subsequent re-release increased this total to $384 million. Spider-Man: Into the Spider-Verse was released to widespread critical acclaim, with particular praise directed towards its animation, visual style and effects, as well as the voice ensemble. (Note: Attributed to multiple sources:) On the review aggregator website Rotten Tomatoes, the film holds an approval rating of 97% based on 399 reviews, making it the best reviewed superhero film on the platform. It has since been regarded as one of the greatest animated films of the 21st century and all time. (Note: Attributed to multiple sources:) The film's innovation and influence on the animation industry has also been acknowledged, (Note: Attributed to multiple sources:) including on subsequent productions like The Mitchells vs. the Machines, Puss in Boots: The Last Wish, and Teenage Mutant Ninja Turtles: Mutant Mayhem.

Spider-Man: Into the Spider-Verse won Best Animated Feature at the 91st Academy Awards, becoming the first non-Disney or Pixar film to do so since Rango in 2011 and the sixth non-Disney/Pixar film overall. (Note: Apart from Rango, the other non-Disney/Pixar winning films are Shrek, Spirited Away, Wallace & Gromit: The Curse of the Were-Rabbit and Happy Feet.) The film also won Best Animated Feature Film at the 76th Golden Globe Awards, Best Animated Film at the 72nd British Academy Film Awards, and Best Animated Feature at the 24th Critics' Choice Awards. It received seven nominations at the 46th Annie Awards, including Best Animated Feature and Best Writing in a Feature Production, and won in all its categories. Several critic circles also picked Spider-Man: Into the Spider-Verse as the best animated feature film of the year.

== Accolades ==
Accolades received by Spider-Man: Into the Spider-Verse
Award	Date of ceremony	Category	Recipient(s)	Result	Ref.
Academy Awards	February 24, 2019	Best Animated Feature	Bob Persichetti, Peter Ramsey, Rodney Rothman, Phil Lord and Christopher Miller	Won	
Advanced Imaging Society Lumiere Awards	January 30, 2019	Best Animated Feature Film	Spider-Man: Into the Spider-Verse	Won	
Advanced Imaging Society Lumiere Awards	January 30, 2019	Best Stereography	Spider-Man: Into the Spider-Verse	Won	
African-American Film Critics Association Awards	December 11, 2018	Best Animated Feature	Spider-Man: Into the Spider-Verse	Won	
Alliance of Women Film Journalists EDA Awards	January 10, 2019	Best Animated Feature Film	Spider-Man: Into the Spider-Verse	Won	
Alliance of Women Film Journalists EDA Awards	January 10, 2019	Best Animated Female	Hailee Steinfeld (as Gwen Stacy)	Nominated	
American Cinema Editors Eddie Awards	February 1, 2019	Best Edited Animated Feature Film	Robert Fisher Jr.	Won	
American Music Awards	November 24, 2019	Favorite Soundtrack	Spider-Man: Into the Spider-Verse	Nominated	
American Music Awards	November 24, 2019	Collaboration of the Year	"Sunflower" (Post Malone and Swae Lee)	Nominated	
American Music Awards	November 24, 2019	Favorite Song – Pop/Rock	"Sunflower" (Post Malone and Swae Lee)	Nominated	
Annie Awards	February 2, 2019	Best Animated Feature	Spider-Man: Into the Spider-Verse	Won	
Annie Awards	February 2, 2019	Outstanding Achievement for Character Animation in an Animated Feature Production	David Han	Won	
Annie Awards	February 2, 2019	Outstanding Achievement for Character Design in an Animated Feature Production	Shiyoon Kim	Won	
Annie Awards	February 2, 2019	Outstanding Achievement for Directing in an Animated Feature Production	Bob Persichetti, Peter Ramsey and Rodney Rothman	Won	
Annie Awards	February 2, 2019	Outstanding Achievement for Production Design in an Animated Feature Production	Justin K. Thompson	Won	
Annie Awards	February 2, 2019	Outstanding Achievement for Writing in an Animated Feature Production	Phil Lord and Rodney Rothman	Won	
Annie Awards	February 2, 2019	Outstanding Achievement for Editorial in an Animated Feature Production	Robert Fisher Jr., Andrew Leviton and Vivek Sharma	Won	
Art Directors Guild Awards	February 2, 2019	Excellence in Production Design for an Animated Film	Justin K. Thompson	Nominated	
Austin Film Critics Association Awards	January 7, 2019	Best Animated Film	Spider-Man: Into the Spider-Verse	Won	
Austin Film Critics Association Awards	January 7, 2019	Best Motion Capture/Special Effects Performance	Shameik Moore	Nominated	
Austin Film Critics Association Awards	January 7, 2019	Bobby McCurdy Memorial Breakthrough Artist Award	Brian Tyree Henry	Won (Note: Also for If Beale Street Could Talk and Widows)	
Austin Film Critics Association Awards	January 7, 2019	Top 10 Films	Spider-Man: Into the Spider-Verse	6th Place	
BET Awards	June 23, 2019	Best Movie	Spider-Man: Into the Spider-Verse	Nominated	
Black Reel Awards	February 7, 2019	Outstanding Voice Performance	Mahershala Ali	Nominated	
Black Reel Awards	February 7, 2019	Outstanding Voice Performance	Shameik Moore	Won	
Black Reel Awards	February 7, 2019	Outstanding Voice Performance	Brian Tyree Henry	Nominated	
Blue Ribbon Awards	February 18, 2020	Best Foreign Film	Spider-Man: Into the Spider-Verse	Nominated	
British Academy Children's Awards	December 1, 2019	Feature Film	Spider-Man: Into the Spider-Verse	Won	
British Academy Film Awards	February 10, 2019	Best Animated Film	Bob Persichetti, Peter Ramsey, Rodney Rothman and Phil Lord	Won	
Chicago Film Critics Association Awards	December 8, 2018	Best Animated Feature	Spider-Man: Into the Spider-Verse	Won	
Cinema Audio Society Awards	February 16, 2019	Outstanding Achievement in Sound Mixing for a Motion Picture – Animated	Brian Smith, Aaron Hasson, Howard London, Michael Semanick, Tony Lamberti, Sam Okell, and Randy K. Singer	Nominated	
Critics' Choice Movie Awards	January 13, 2019	Best Animated Feature	Spider-Man: Into the Spider-Verse	Won	
Dallas–Fort Worth Film Critics Association Awards	December 17, 2018	Best Animated Film	Spider-Man: Into the Spider-Verse	Runner-up	
Detroit Film Critics Society Awards	December 3, 2018	Best Animated Feature	Spider-Man: Into the Spider-Verse	Won	
Dragon Awards	September 1, 2019	Best Science Fiction or Fantasy Movie	Spider-Man: Into the Spider-Verse	Nominated	
Florida Film Critics Circle Awards	December 21, 2018	Best Animated Film	Spider-Man: Into the Spider-Verse	Runner-up	
Georgia Film Critics Association Awards	January 12, 2019	Best Animated Film	Spider-Man: Into the Spider-Verse	Won	
Golden Globe Awards	January 6, 2019	Best Animated Feature Film	Spider-Man: Into the Spider-Verse	Won	
Golden Raspberry Awards	February 23, 2019	Razzie Redeemer Award	Sony Pictures Animation	Nominated	
Golden Reel Awards	February 17, 2019	Outstanding Achievement in Sound Editing – Sound Effects, Foley, Dialogue and ADR for Animated Feature Film	Spider-Man: Into the Spider-Verse	Won	
Golden Reel Awards	February 17, 2019	Outstanding Achievement in Sound Editing – Music Score for Feature Film	Spider-Man: Into the Spider-Verse	Won	
Golden Trailer Awards	May 30, 2019	Best Music TV Spot (for a Feature Film)	Sony and Open Road (for "Ham")	Nominated	
Golden Trailer Awards	May 30, 2019	Best TrailerByte for a Feature Length Film	Sony and Open Road (for "Ham")	Nominated	
Grammy Awards	January 26, 2020	Record of the Year	"Sunflower" (Post Malone and Swae Lee)	Nominated	
Grammy Awards	January 26, 2020	Best Pop Duo/Group Performance	"Sunflower" (Post Malone and Swae Lee)	Nominated	
Grammy Awards	January 26, 2020	Best Compilation Soundtrack for Visual Media	Spider-Man: Into the Spider-Verse	Nominated	
Guild of Music Supervisors Awards	February 13, 2019	Best Song Written and/or Recording Created for a Film	"Sunflower" (Post Malone and Swae Lee)	Nominated	
Guild of Music Supervisors Awards	February 13, 2019	Best Music Supervision in a Film Trailer	Jordan Silverberg (for "Trailer 1")	Won	
Harvey Awards	October 4, 2019	Best Adaptation From a Comic	Spider-Man: Into the Spider-Verse	Won	
Hollywood Professional Association Awards	November 22, 2019	Outstanding Color Grading – Feature Film	Natasha Leonnet (EFILM)	Won	
Houston Film Critics Society Awards	January 3, 2019	Best Animated Feature	Spider-Man: Into the Spider-Verse	Nominated	
Hugo Awards	August 18, 2019	Best Dramatic Presentation, Long Form	Spider-Man: Into the Spider-Verse	Won	
ICG Publicists Awards	February 22, 2019	Maxwell Weinberg Publicist Showmanship Award	Spider-Man: Into the Spider-Verse	Nominated	
International Cinephile Society Awards	February 4, 2019	Best Animated Feature	Spider-Man: Into the Spider-Verse	Runner-up	
International Film Music Critics Association Awards	February 21, 2019	Best Original Score for an Animated Film	Daniel Pemberton	Nominated	
Ivor Novello Awards	May 23, 2019	Best Original Film Score	Daniel Pemberton	Nominated	
Los Angeles Film Critics Association Awards	December 9, 2018	Best Animated Feature	Spider-Man: Into the Spider-Verse	Won	
Los Angeles Online Film Critics Society Awards	December 7, 2018	Best Animated Film	Spider-Man: Into the Spider-Verse	Won	
Movieguide Awards	February 8, 2019	Best Movie for Families	Spider-Man: Into the Spider-Verse	Nominated	
MTV Movie & TV Awards	June 17, 2019	Best Movie	Spider-Man: Into the Spider-Verse	Nominated	
NAACP Image Awards	March 30, 2019	Outstanding Soundtrack/Compilation	Spider-Man: Into the Spider-Verse	Nominated	
NAACP Image Awards	March 30, 2019	Outstanding Character Voice-Over Performance – Television or Film	Mahershala Ali	Nominated	
NAACP Image Awards	March 30, 2019	Outstanding Character Voice-Over Performance – Television or Film	Shameik Moore	Nominated	
National Society of Film Critics Awards	January 5, 2019	Best Supporting Actor	Brian Tyree Henry	Runner-up (Note: Also for Widows and tied with Richard E. Grant for Can You Ever Forgive Me?.)	
Nebula Awards	May 18, 2019	Ray Bradbury Award	Phil Lord and Rodney Rothman	Won	
New York Film Critics Circle Awards	November 29, 2018	Best Animated Feature	Spider-Man: Into the Spider-Verse	Won	
New York Film Critics Online Awards	December 9, 2018	Best Animated Feature	Spider-Man: Into the Spider-Verse	Won	
Nickelodeon Kids' Choice Awards	March 23, 2019	Favorite Animated Movie	Spider-Man: Into the Spider-Verse	Nominated	
Nickelodeon Kids' Choice Awards	March 23, 2019	Favorite Male Voice from an Animated Movie	Shameik Moore	Nominated	
Nickelodeon Kids' Choice Awards	March 23, 2019	Favorite Female Voice from an Animated Movie	Hailee Steinfeld	Nominated	
Online Film Critics Society Awards	January 2, 2019	Best Animated Feature	Spider-Man: Into the Spider-Verse	Won	
Producers Guild of America Awards	January 19, 2019	Outstanding Producer of Animated Theatrical Motion Pictures	Avi Arad, Phil Lord, Christopher Miller, Amy Pascal and Christina Steinberg	Won	
Rondo Hatton Classic Horror Awards	April 30, 2019	Best Fantasy/Action Film	Spider-Man: Into the Spider-Verse	Won	
San Diego Film Critics Society Awards	December 10, 2018	Best Animated Feature	Spider-Man: Into the Spider-Verse	Runner-up	
San Francisco Bay Area Film Critics Circle Awards	December 9, 2018	Best Animated Feature	Spider-Man: Into the Spider-Verse	Won	
Saturn Awards	September 13, 2019	Best Comic-to-Film Motion Picture	Spider-Man: Into the Spider-Verse	Nominated	
Saturn Awards	September 13, 2019	Best Animated Film	Spider-Man: Into the Spider-Verse	Won	
Seattle Film Critics Society Awards	December 17, 2018	Best Animated Feature	Spider-Man: Into the Spider-Verse	Won	
St. Louis Film Critics Association Awards	December 16, 2018	Best Animated Feature	Spider-Man: Into the Spider-Verse	Won	
SXSW Film Awards	March 12, 2019	Excellence in Title Design	Brian Mah and James Ramirez	Won	
Teen Choice Awards	August 11, 2019	Choice Action Movie	Spider-Man: Into the Spider-Verse	Nominated	
Teen Choice Awards	August 11, 2019	Choice Song From A Movie	"Sunflower" (Post Malone and Swae Lee)	Nominated	
Toronto Film Critics Association Awards	December 9, 2018	Best Animated Film	Spider-Man: Into the Spider-Verse	Nominated	
Visual Effects Society Awards	February 5, 2019	Outstanding Visual Effects in an Animated Feature	Joshua Beveridge, Christian Hejnal, Danny Dimian and Bret St. Clair	Won	
Visual Effects Society Awards	February 5, 2019	Outstanding Animated Character in an Animated Feature	Marcos Kang, Chad Belteau, Humberto Rosa, and Julie Bernier Gosselin (for "Miles Morales")	Won	
Visual Effects Society Awards	February 5, 2019	Outstanding Created Environment in an Animated Feature	Terry Park, Bret St. Clair, Kimberly Liptrap and Dave Morehead (for "Graphic New York City")	Won	
Visual Effects Society Awards	February 5, 2019	Outstanding Effects Simulations in an Animated Feature	Ian Farnsworth, Pav Grochola, Simon Corbaux and Brian D. Casper	Won	
Washington D.C. Area Film Critics Association Awards	December 3, 2018	Best Animated Feature	Spider-Man: Into the Spider-Verse	Nominated	
Washington D.C. Area Film Critics Association Awards	December 3, 2018	Best Animated Voice Performance	Shameik Moore	Nominated	
World Soundtrack Awards	October 18, 2019	Film Composer of the Year	Daniel Pemberton	Nominated	
World Soundtrack Awards	October 18, 2019	Best Original Song Written Directly for a Film	"Sunflower" (Post Malone and Swae Lee)	Nominated	

== See also ==
- List of accolades received by Spider-Man: Across the Spider-Verse
