= Shiyoon Kim =

Concept artist working for Disney

Shiyoon Kim (Korean: 김시윤; born 1983) is a Korean American character designer and concept artist. He has worked at Walt Disney Animation Studios and Sony Pictures Animation, where he designed the characters for the Academy Award winning Spider-Man: Into the Spider-Verse. He is also known for his work on the animated films Tangled (2010), Wreck-It Ralph (2012), Big Hero 6 (2014), and Zootopia (2016).

== Early life ==
Shiyoon Kim was born in South Korea in 1983. He moved to the United States at the age of two. Kim began to draw at the age of three, and throughout his childhood would "constantly draw whenever [he] got the chance or got bored." After seeing his proclivity towards drawing, his parents encouraged him to keep on going, and moved from Massachusetts to California to enroll him in a high school animation program shortly after tenth grade. The program Kim entered was the Rowland R.O.P. Animation Program.

Kim credits one of his professors Larry Kurnarsky with teaching him the importance of a story-driven piece. One of the main lessons which Kurnarsky taught Kim was that everything within a piece of art, or even a collection of art relates back to the story in one way, shape, or form. Kim even stated that, "Everything he looked at (storyboards, character design, layouts, animation, etc.) was in terms of how it is either pushing the story or hindering it." It was the advice of Kurnarsky that prompted Shiyoon Kim to take his first life drawing classes at the Art Center College of Design in Pasadena, California. After graduating from his high school, Kim decided he wanted to continue his education at CalArts. It was here that he studied the different components of filmmaking and animation. Kim credits the school with teaching him how to create a film, compelled by an intriguing story narrative.

== Career ==
At CalArts, Kim made Leash Boy, and The Fox and the Boy, as his third and fourth-year films, respectively. After graduation, Kim worked for Rough Draft Studios on the Futurama DVD box sets. During this time, he also interned at Pixar for Animation, and worked on doing some animation tests with the Ratatouille models (none of which appeared within the movie). After these jobs he moved on to Disney's Apprentice Program for visual development.

At Disney, Shiyoon Kim has designed characters for films including Tangled, Wreck-It Ralph, Frozen. He was most recently the lead character designer on Big Hero 6.

== Filmography ==
Kim started off his career at Disney working on the Prep & Landing (2009) films where he is credited as working within the art department. After this he moved on to work on Tangled (2010), as an accredited character designer. He also worked on the animated end credits of the film. Following Tangled, he worked on the 2011 version of Winnie-the-Pooh, in the visual development department. Once Winnie-the-Pooh was taken care of he worked on Minkyu Lee's Academy Award-nominated short film Adam and Dog (2011) as an animator and digital colorist. The success only continued as Tangled grew to be so popular, that following the movie the demand for a wedding scene was so large that the creative teams once again had to come together to create a short film, Tangled Ever After. Kim was once again in charge of doing the end credits for the short film. Paperman (2012) was the next short film which he worked on once again as a character designer. In 2013, he worked on Frozen as the designer of the Duke of Weseltown, and on the short film Feast as a character designer.

In 2014, his most notable credit would be the animated superhero film Big Hero 6, where he was enlisted to be the lead character designer on the film.

Most recently he has worked as a character designer for the academy award winning film Zootopia (2016), and the short film Inner Workings (2016). He is credited with designing Zootopia characters including Mayor Lionheart, Assistant Mayor Bellwether, Flash, Gazelle, and Bonnie and Stu Hopps. Kim would later serve as lead character designer on Sony Pictures Animation's Spider-Man: Into the Spider-Verse in 2018.

== Big Hero 6 designs ==
=== Lead characters ===
In Big Hero 6, Shiyoon Kim worked as lead character designer for the film. As a major character designer during the early phases of production, Shiyoon Kim wanted Korean characters to be in a Disney animated feature film for the first time. According to Jin Kim, the character design supervisor of Big Hero 6 and a fellow Korean Disney artist, Shiyoon Kim originally designed the lead [Asian] characters, (such as Hiro Hamada, Tadashi Hamada, and GoGo Tomago) as Korean characters according to an interview with The Korea Herald.

"Early designs were drafted by Kim Shiyoon, a fellow Korean animator, who originally created the characters as Koreans. Of course, there are no mentions of specific nationalities in the film, but that was what we, the artists, imagined," (Jin) Kim said.

As the project finalized, the approved designs for Hiro Hamada and Tadashi Hamada were ultimately given Japanese origins with GoGo Tomago resulting in being the only character to be officially Korean. However, the Korean origins among the characters are still evident as Hiro Hamada's design was based on Shiyoon Kim's childhood self, Tadashi Hamada by his Korean-Irish American voice actor Daniel Henney, and GoGo Tomago by her Korean American voice actress Jamie Chung, based on her personality and Korean actress, Bae Doona based on her looks.

=== Baymax ===
Kim was also in charge of designing Baymax, a sentient robot created by Tadashi that takes care of Hiro and his friends. Kim stated that for Baymax's simple yet quite expressive face, Japanese traditional bells were used as reference and for his durable yet inflated body, "Soft Robotics" (founded by Professor Yong-Lae Park at Carnegie Mellon University's Robotics Institute) was incorporated into the design.

== Personal life ==
On July 20, 2013, Kim married Jihyun Park. Kim currently lives in Los Angeles, California with Park and his two daughters.

== Awards ==
Kim was nominated for the 42nd Annual Annie Awards for Character Design in an Animated Production for Big Hero 6 (2014).
