= Spider-Man: Into the Spider-Verse =

2018 animated superhero film

- Theatrical release poster
- Directed by: Bob Persichetti; Peter Ramsey; Rodney Rothman
- Screenplay by: Phil Lord; Rodney Rothman
- Story by: Phil Lord
- Based on: Marvel Comics
- Produced by: Avi Arad; Amy Pascal; Phil Lord; Christopher Miller; Christina Steinberg
- Starring: Shameik Moore; Jake Johnson; Hailee Steinfeld; Mahershala Ali; Brian Tyree Henry; Lily Tomlin; Luna Lauren Vélez; Zoë Kravitz; John Mulaney; Kimiko Glenn; Nicolas Cage; Kathryn Hahn; Liev Schreiber
- Edited by: Robert Fisher Jr.
- Music by: Daniel Pemberton
- Production companies: Columbia Pictures; Marvel Entertainment; Sony Pictures Animation; Pascal Pictures; Arad Productions; Lord Miller Productions
- Distributed by: Sony Pictures Releasing
- Release dates: December 1, 2018 (Regency Village Theater); December 14, 2018 (United States)
- Running time: 117 minutes
- Country: United States
- Language: English
- Budget: $90 million
- Box office: $395 million

Spider-Man: Into the Spider-Verse is a 2018 American animated superhero film based on the Marvel Comics character Spider-Man. Directed by Bob Persichetti, Peter Ramsey and Rodney Rothman from a screenplay by Phil Lord and Rothman, it is the first animated film in the Spider-Man franchise. Shameik Moore stars as the voice of Miles Morales, with Jake Johnson, Hailee Steinfeld, Mahershala Ali, Brian Tyree Henry, Lily Tomlin, Luna Lauren Vélez, Zoë Kravitz, John Mulaney, Kimiko Glenn, Nicolas Cage, Kathryn Hahn, and Liev Schreiber in supporting voice roles. The film's story follows Miles as he becomes the new Spider-Man and teams up with other Spider-People from various parallel universes to save his universe from the Kingpin. It was produced by Columbia Pictures and Sony Pictures Animation in association with Marvel Entertainment.

Plans for an animated Spider-Man film by Phil Lord and Christopher Miller were leaked in 2014 and announced in April 2015. Persichetti, Ramsey and Rothman joined over the next two years, with Moore and Schreiber cast in April 2017. Lord and Miller wanted the film to have a unique style, combining computer animation with hand-drawn comic techniques inspired by the work of Miles Morales co-creator Sara Pichelli. The film required the largest crew of animators used by Sony Pictures Animation on a feature film.

The film premiered at the Regency Village Theater in Los Angeles on December 1, 2018, and was theatrically released in the United States on December 14. The film grossed $395 million worldwide against a $90 million budget and received critical acclaim. The film won Best Animated Feature at the 91st Academy Awards, and numerous other accolades. Lauded as one of the most important animated films of the 2010s, the film is acknowledged for its groundbreaking achievement in animation, with praise for its aesthetics and recognition of its influence.

A sequel, Spider-Man: Across the Spider-Verse, was released on June 2, 2023, to similar critical acclaim and greater commercial success, while a third film, Spider-Man: Beyond the Spider-Verse, is scheduled for release on June 18, 2027, with spin-offs in development.

== Plot ==
New York City teenager Miles Morales struggles to live up to the expectations of his father, police officer Jefferson Davis, who sees Spider-Man, the superhero persona of Peter Parker, as a menace. Miles's uncle Aaron takes him to an abandoned metro station to paint graffiti as a way to cheer him up. There, Miles is bitten by a radioactive spider and gains abilities similar to Spider-Man. Returning to the station, he discovers a collider built by Kingpin, who hopes to access parallel universes to abduct alternate versions of his late wife Vanessa and son Richard, whose deaths he condemns Peter for.

Peter attempts to shut down the collider while fighting Kingpin's enforcers the Green Goblin and Prowler, but is badly wounded when Green Goblin shoves him into it. He gives Miles a USB flash drive designed to sabotage the collider, warning that the machine could destroy the city if reactivated. After watching in horror as Kingpin murders Peter, Miles flees. As the city mourns Peter's death, Miles tries to honor his legacy by succeeding him as Spider-Man but inadvertently damages the flash drive. At Peter's grave, he meets Peter B. Parker, an alternate Peter from another dimension.

The duo infiltrate Alchemax to steal data for a new flash drive. They are confronted by its proprietor, Olivia Octavius, who discovers that Peter will die from cellular decay if he remains in their dimension. She reveals herself as this universe's Doctor Octopus and attempts to attack, chasing Miles and Peter into the nearby forest. The duo are then saved by Gwen Stacy, a Spider-Woman from another dimension. Following her defeat, Octavius returns to the lab where a furious Kingpin is waiting for her, whom she reassures that getting rid of them will be no problem and he and his family will be reunited. They visit Spider-Man's aunt, May, who is sheltering more Spider-People from other dimensions who slipped into Miles' universe due to the collider's influence – Spider-Man Noir, Peni Parker and Spider-Ham – who are also deteriorating. Miles offers to help the others return home but they tell him he lacks experience.

Distraught, Miles retreats to Aaron's apartment, where he discovers his uncle is Prowler. He returns to the Parker house, where the new drive is completed, being followed by Kingpin's team. In the ensuing brawl, he reveals his identity to Aaron. Unwilling to murder his own nephew, Aaron attempts to spare Miles, but is fatally shot by Kingpin in retaliation and dies in Miles' arms. Miles flees just as Jefferson arrives on the scene and mistakes the new Spider-Man as his brother's murderer before regrouping with the other Spider-People. Not wanting to let Miles get killed, Peter restrains Miles and chooses to sacrifice himself by staying behind and deactivating the collider.

Jefferson arrives outside the door of Miles's dorm room as he apologizes for his mistakes and expresses his faith in Miles, inspiring him. Miles manages to control his powers, escapes his restraints and creates his own Spider-Man suit with the help of Aunt May. He joins his allies in defeating Kingpin's enforcers and uses the new drive to send them home. Kingpin fights and overpowers Miles, attracting Jefferson's attention. Realizing that Spider-Man is not the menace he saw him as, he encourages Miles, who throws Kingpin at the collider's kill switch, destroying it. The city is saved and Kingpin's team is arrested as Jefferson receives evidence of Kingpin's murders of Aaron and the first Spider-Man.

Miles embraces the responsibilities of his new life. Later, Gwen finds a way to contact Miles from her home dimension. (Note: In Spider-Man: Across the Spider-Verse (2023), this scene is established to take place sixteen months later.) Elsewhere, Miguel O'Hara travels to Earth-67 and ends up in a humorous argument with its Spider-Man. (Note: This scene is a reference to a scene from the 1967–1970 Spider-Man TV series episode "Double Identity", in which the villain Charles Cameo dresses up like Spider-Man to impersonate him; the episode's scene has since become an Internet meme.)

== Voice cast ==
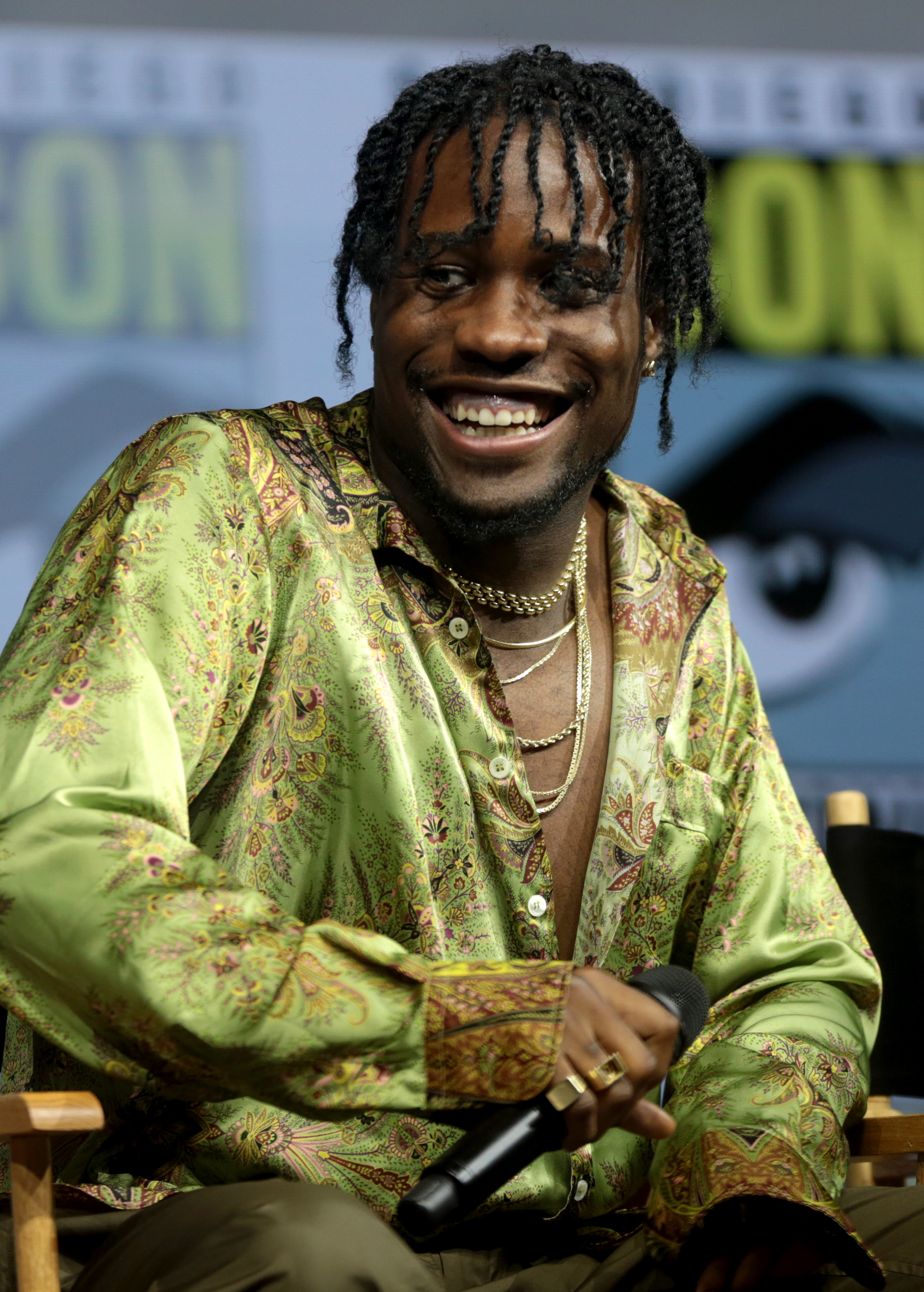
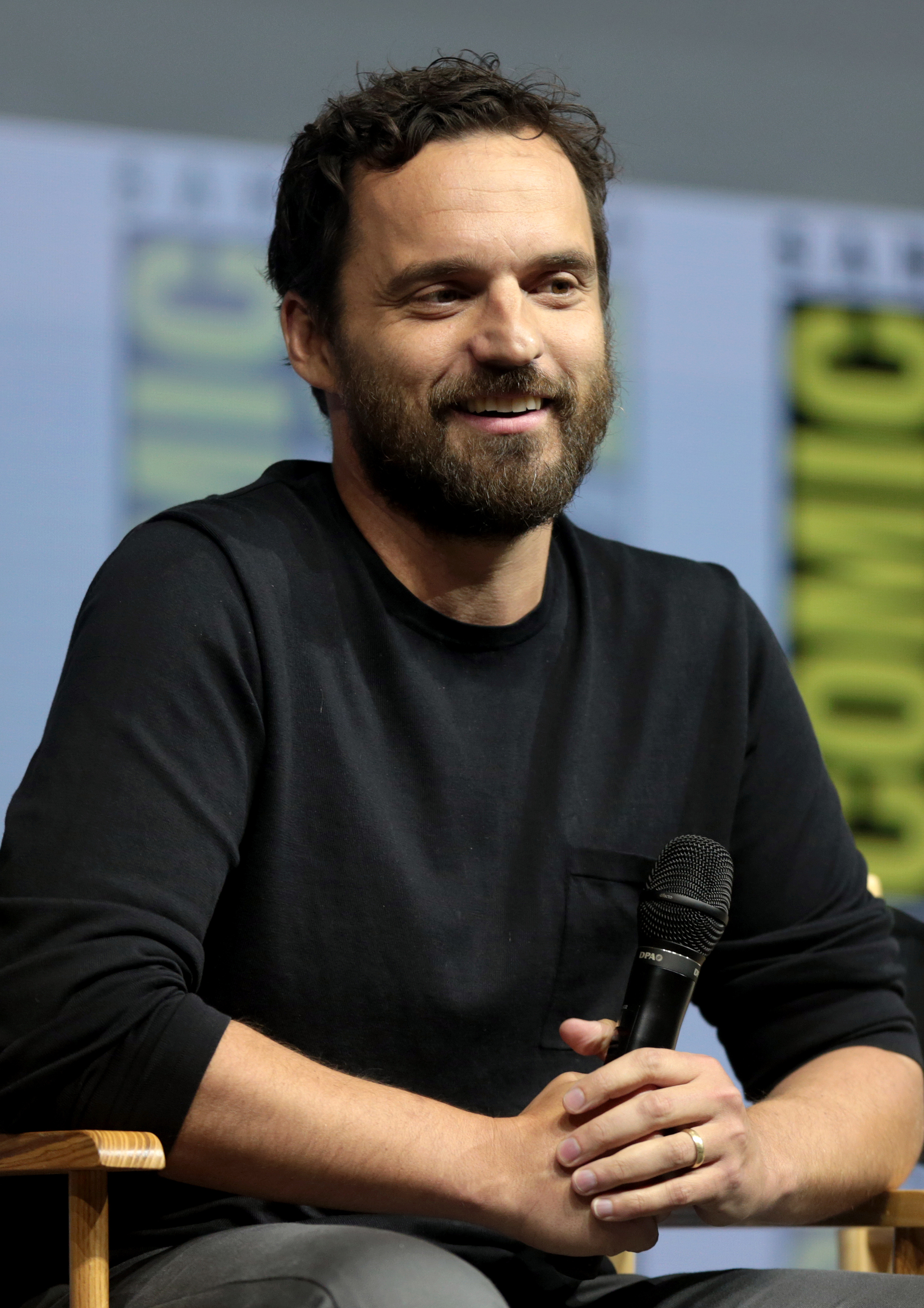
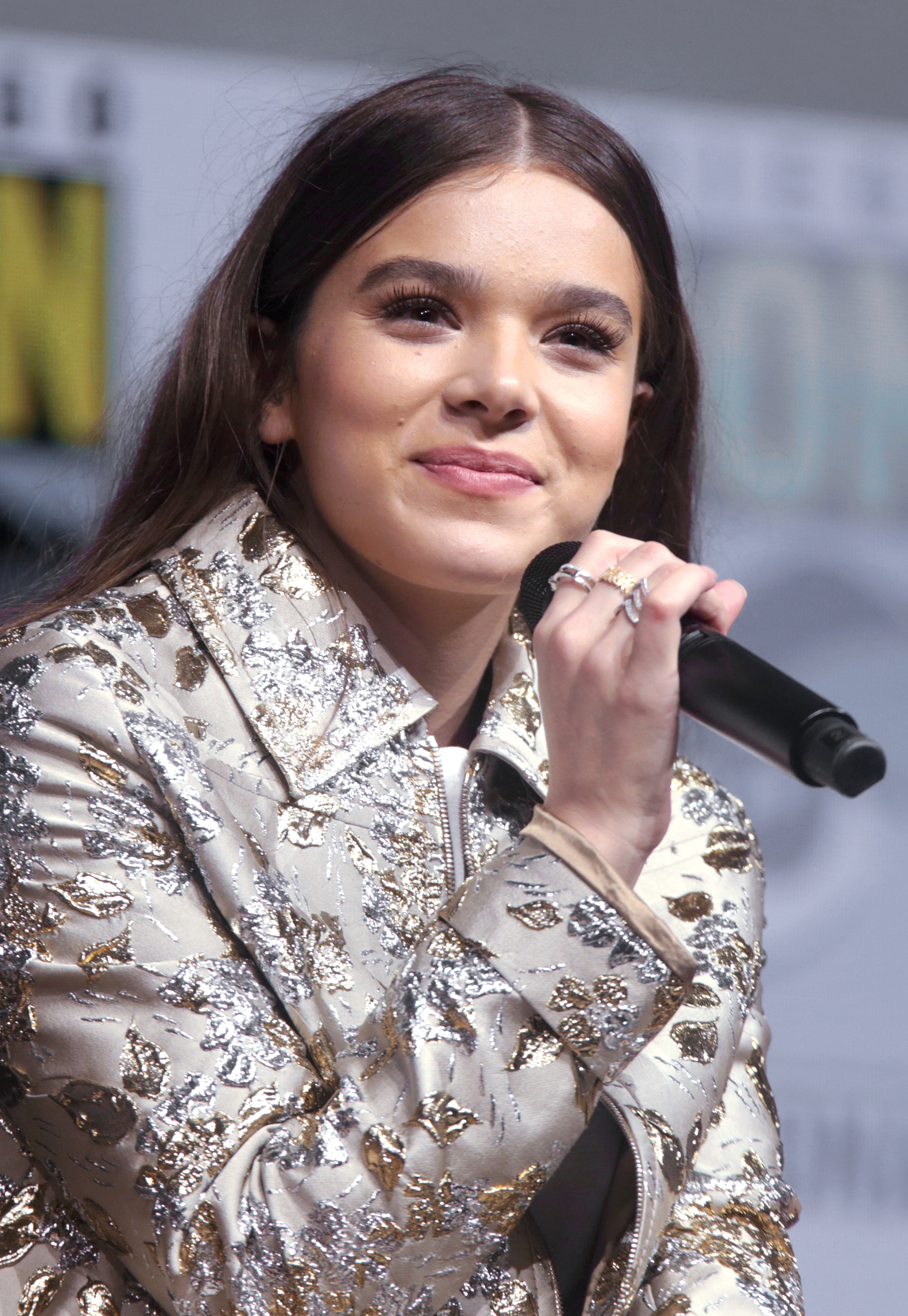
Shameik Moore, Jake Johnson and Hailee Steinfeld promoting the film at the 2018 San Diego Comic-Con
- Shameik Moore as Miles Morales / Spider-Man: An intelligent and rebellious teenager of African-American and Puerto Rican descent, who is imbued with spider-like abilities after being bitten by a radioactive spider and eventually becomes the new Spider-Man. Producers Lord and Miller described the character as unique among Spider-Men because of his Brooklyn upbringing, his African-American and Puerto-Rican background, and the fact that his family is still alive, with that family dynamic being central to the film's story.
- Jake Johnson as Peter B. Parker / Spider-Man: Miles' reluctant mentor, a disheveled, jaded and brown-haired 38-year-old counterpart of Spider-Man from another dimension. The character is intended to be an amalgamation of all pop culture Spider-Man adaptations and interpretations. Lord and Miller envisioned him to be like Mr. Miyagi from The Karate Kid franchise, if "Mr. Miyagi doesn't know anything", which they thought was a "really neat color to put onto Peter that we hadn't seen before".
- Hailee Steinfeld as Gwen Stacy / Spider-Gwen / Spider-Woman: A dimensionally-displaced counterpart of Gwen Stacy with spider-like abilities, who takes up the alias of "Gwanda" while at Miles' school. In onscreen comic books while explaining her origin story, the character is referred to as "Spider-Gwen". Her relationship with Miles is depicted as a growing friendship, while he displays outward romantic feelings on his end. This decision was made to avoid relegating Gwen to being a love interest and to help her to be defined by her capability as a hero.
- Mahershala Ali as Aaron Davis / The Prowler: Miles' uncle, who moonlights as a masked enforcer for Kingpin while keeping it a secret from his family. The character is rebellious, causing him to be looked at poorly by Jefferson.
- Brian Tyree Henry as Jefferson Davis: Miles' African-American and police officer father, who disapproves of Spider-Man's vigilante actions. At the age of thirty-five, Henry had said he was too young to portray a father of a teenager, but agreed to the role after learning that Miles Morales was the only black and Latino Spider-Man.
- Lily Tomlin as May Parker: Peter's aunt, who is deceased in Peter B. Parker's universe and provides refuge for the other Spider-People in Miles' universe.
- Luna Lauren Vélez as Rio Morales: Miles's Puerto Rican and nurse mother.
- Zoë Kravitz as Mary Jane "MJ" Parker: Peter Parker's wife in Miles's universe and Peter B. Parker's ex-wife in his universe.
- John Mulaney as Peter Porker / Spider-Ham: A talking animal-based Spider-Man from a cartoon-based anthropomorphic universe, who was once a spider, bitten by a radioactive pig.
- Kimiko Glenn as Peni Parker / SP//dr: A young Japanese-American girl from an alternative and anime-based universe who copilots her late father's biomechanical suit with a radioactive spider that she shares a telepathic link with. The filmmakers initially considered using Silk as their Asian-American Spider-Man, but eventually settled on Peni because of her more distinctive power set compared to the other Spider-People. The character's designs went through a few iterations as her initial design was particularly "iffy". Production designer Justin Thompson considered Lord and Miller's desire to use an anime design and came up with the idea to portray her in an art style similar to Sailor Moon.
- Nicolas Cage as Peter Parker / Spider-Man Noir: A Spider-Man from a monochromatic universe set in the 1930s. Cage based the character on the films of Humphrey Bogart and voices of actors from that era such as James Cagney and Edward G. Robinson.
- Kathryn Hahn as Doctor Olivia Octavius / Doctor Octopus: The head scientist and CEO of Alchemax and a scientific adviser to Kingpin. The character uses highly advanced tentacles and is featured in much of the marketing for Alchemax, even being seen in a documentary shown at Miles' school.
- Liev Schreiber as Wilson Fisk / Kingpin: A crime lord and the benefactor of Alchemax in Miles' dimension. The character is heavily responsible for the creation of the collider and is attempting to bring an alternate version of his deceased family into his dimension.

In addition to the six main versions of Spider-Man present in the film, Chris Pine is featured as the version of Peter Parker's Spider-Man native to Miles' dimension. Though the character offers to mentor Miles, he is murdered by Kingpin following the collider's activation before he can do so. This iteration of Parker was intended to be "as competent a Spider-Man as possible" and combines elements from previous Spider-Man portrayals, but with slight differences to indicate that he is from a different universe than the others. According to Parker's eulogy, he was a graduate student and married to Mary Jane Parker.

Additional voices for the film include: Lake Bell as Vanessa Fisk, Kingpin's wife, Jorma Taccone as Norman Osborn / Green Goblin, a genetically-enhanced mercenary working for Kingpin, Marvin "Krondon" Jones III as Tombstone, Kingpin's silent and heavily-armed bodyguard, Joaquín Cosío as Scorpion, a Mexican cyborg with scorpion-like prosthetics and Post Malone (who contributed to the film's soundtrack) as a bystander in Brooklyn. An archival recording of Cliff Robertson from Spider-Man 2 (2004) was used for a flashback scene involving the character Ben Parker. Spider-Man co-creator Stan Lee appears in a posthumous cameo, as a character named Stan who sells a Spider-Man costume to Morales. Lord and Miller said it was important to give Lee a bigger moment in the film rather than just a passing cameo, because he was "so integral to the spirit of this movie", and the role was "extra meaningful" following Lee's death in November 2018. Lee's character also has several brief "Easter egg" cameos throughout the film, such as when he walks over Miles and Peter B. when they are lying on the streets of New York City. A young Matt Murdock from Gwen's dimension appears in an "Easter egg" cameo during Miles's final confrontation with Kingpin as the latter's alternate universe adopted son.

Cameos during the film's post-credits include Oscar Isaac as Miguel O'Hara, a Spider-Man from the Marvel 2099 imprint, Greta Lee as O'Hara's AI assistant Lyla (respectively credited as "Interesting Person #1" and "Interesting Person #2") and Jorma Taccone as the Spider-Man from the 1967 animated series (replacing Paul Soles, with the character being credited as "Last Dude"). Donald Glover appears on a background TV screen, which is displaying a scene from the episode "Anthropology 101" of Community in which Glover's character, Troy Barnes, wears Spider-Man pajamas. This scene, a reference to an unsuccessful Twitter campaign suggesting Glover be cast in the lead role of The Amazing Spider-Man (2012), was cited by Miles Morales's creator, Brian Michael Bendis, as influencing the design and portrayal of the character. Glover had previously voiced a version of Miles Morales in the Ultimate Spider-Man animated series, and played Aaron Davis in the Marvel Cinematic Universe (MCU) film Spider-Man: Homecoming (2017).

Miles Morales's best friend and roommate Ganke Lee appears. The character originally had a bigger role, but was rewritten due to Spider-Man: Homecoming having the similar character Ned Leeds. Pixar animator Peter Sohn was cast as Ganke before the character's dialogue was cut from the final film; Sohn would later voice the character in the sequel, Spider-Man: Across the Spider-Verse (2023).

== Production ==
=== Development ===
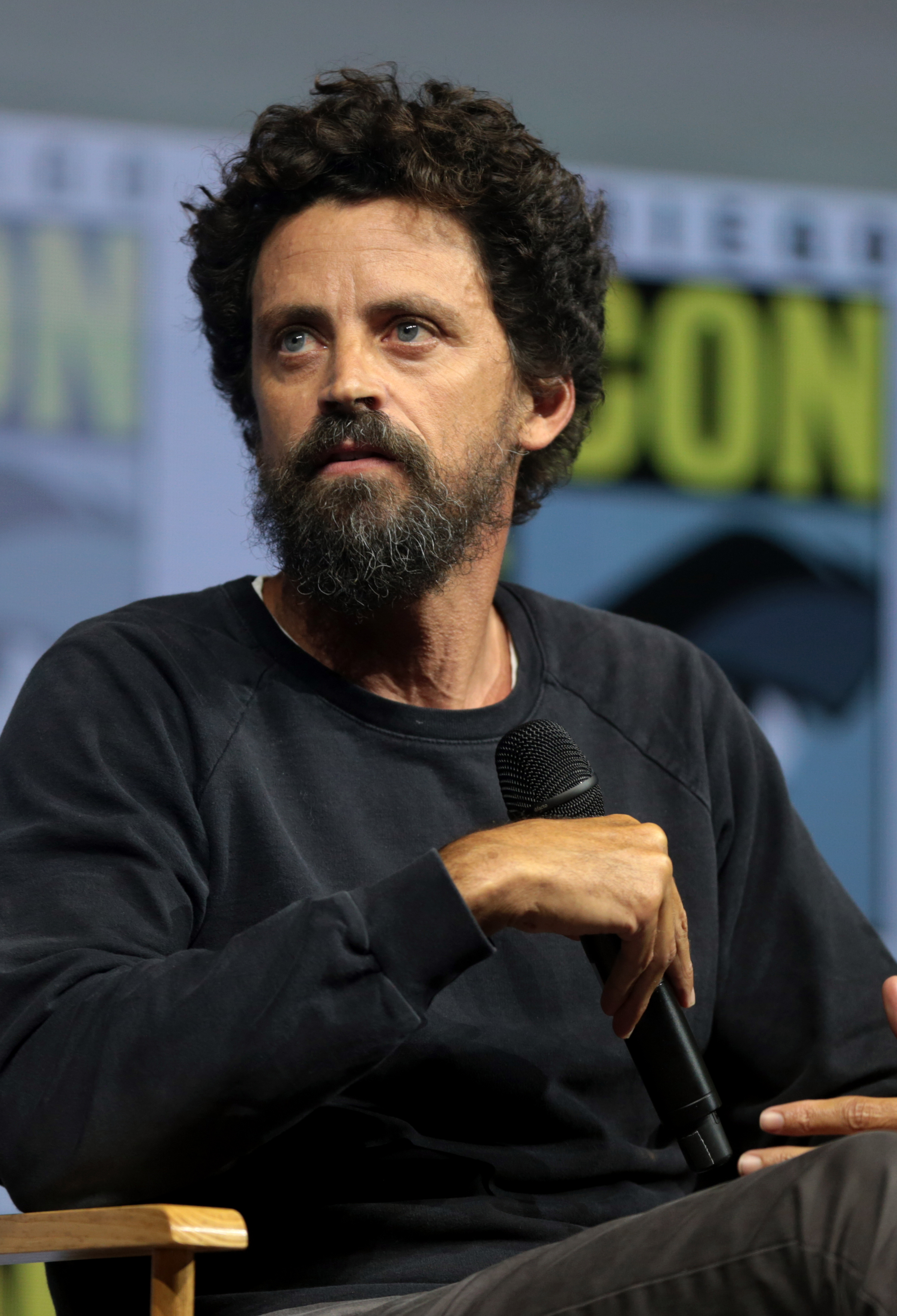
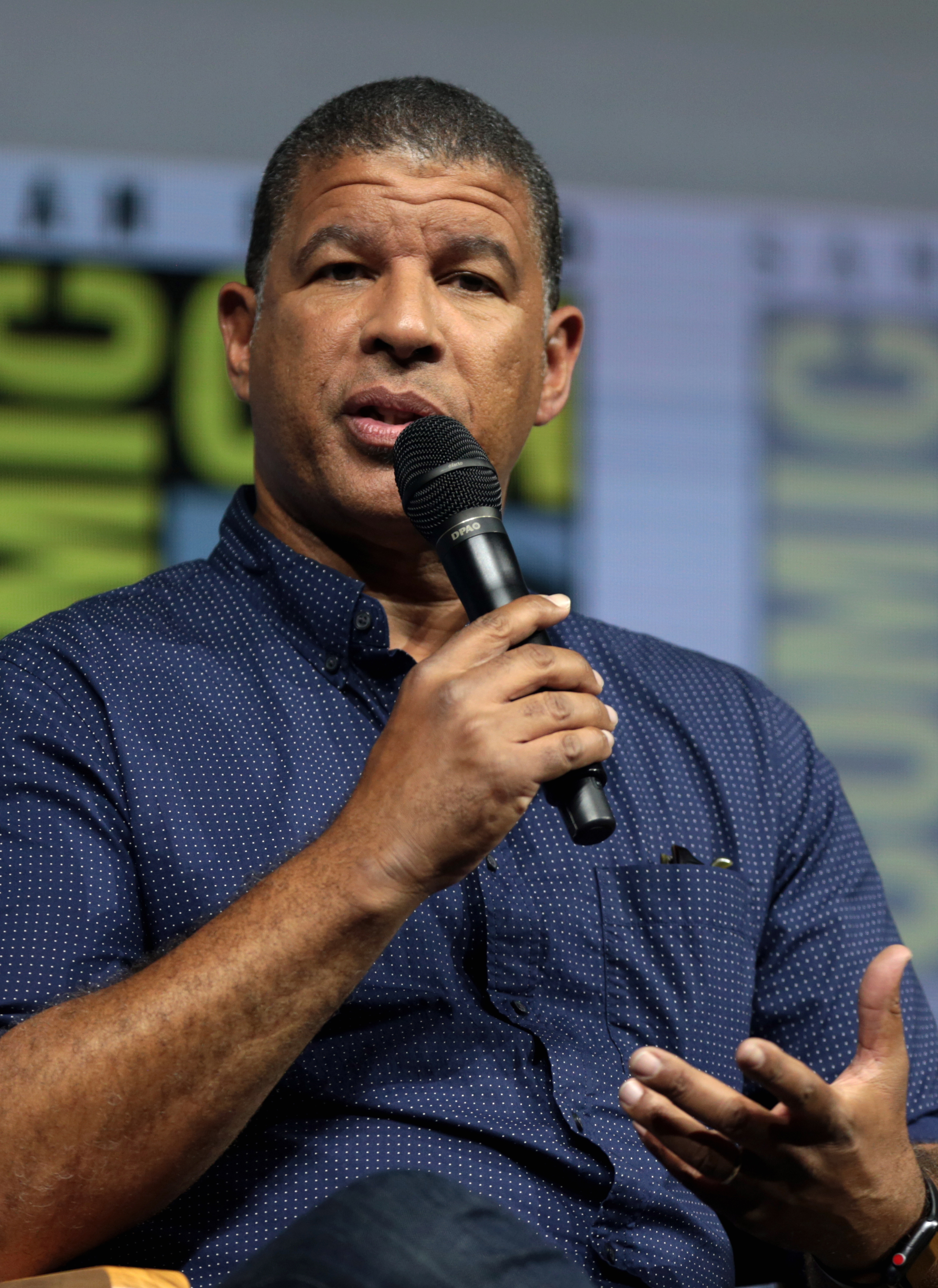
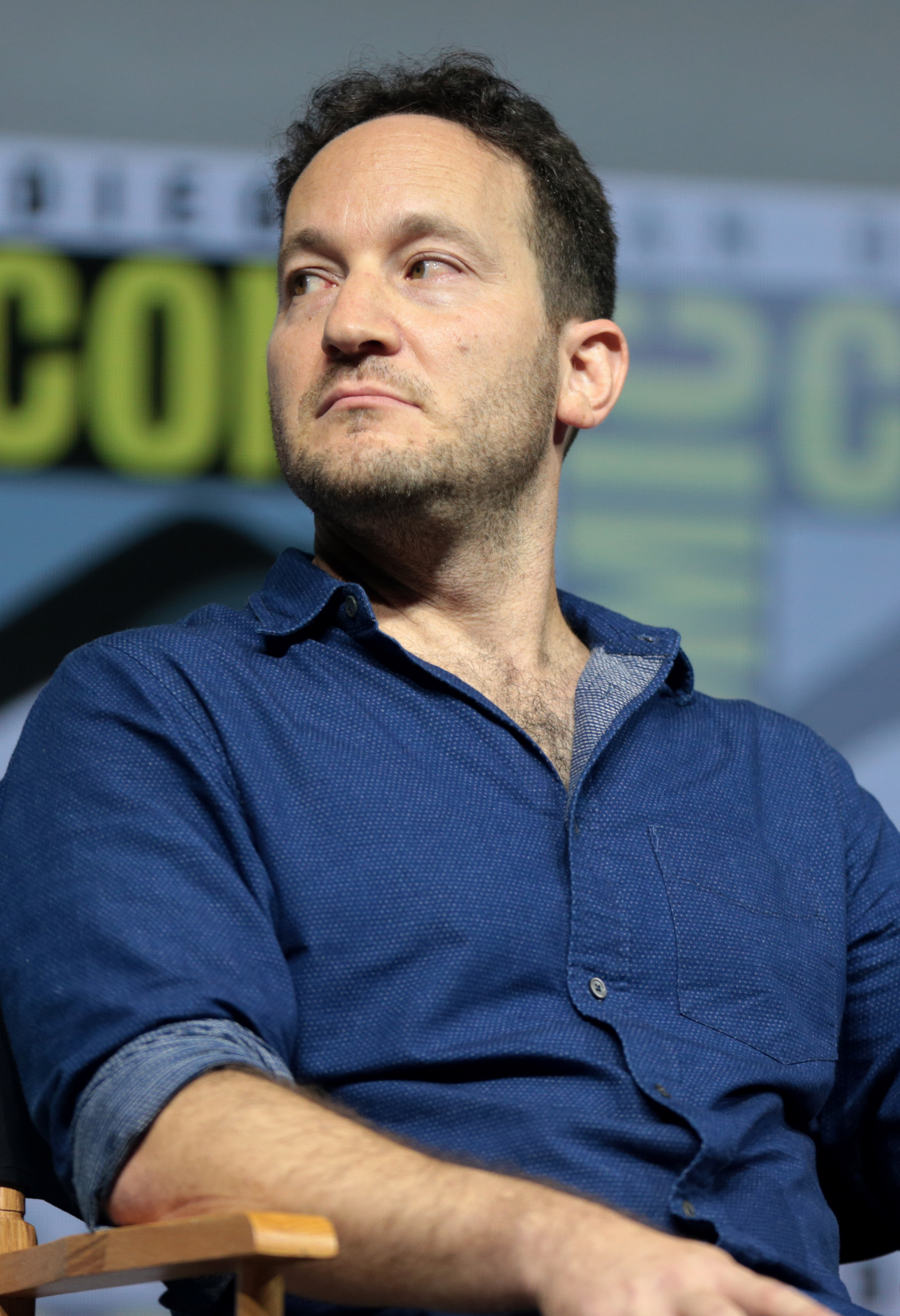
Directors Bob Persichetti, Peter Ramsey, and Rodney Rothman at the 2018 San Diego Comic-Con

Following the November 2014 hacking of Sony's computers, emails between then-Sony Pictures Entertainment co-chairman Amy Pascal and president Doug Belgrad were released, saying that Sony was planning to "rejuvenate" the Spider-Man franchise by developing an animated comedy film with Phil Lord and Christopher Miller. During her time as Sony's co-chairman, Pascal approached Lord and Miller about making an animated Spider-Man movie, to which Lord and Miller agreed with the condition that they could adapt Dan Slott's 2014 "Spider-Verse" comic book storyline and star Miles Morales as the protagonist. Phil Lord and Chris Miller believed that Miles' storyline in the comics would make a strong foundation for the movie, interpreting it as a "perfect origin myth for a young person figuring out what kind of person they want to be". Sony executives were set to talk about the project further in a discussion regarding several Spider-Man spin-off films at a summit in January 2015. At the 2015 CinemaCon in April, Sony Pictures chairman Tom Rothman announced that the animated Spider-Man film had a July 20, 2018 release date, and would be produced by Lord and Miller, Avi Arad, Matt Tolmach, and Pascal, with Lord and Miller also writing a treatment for the film. Rothman said that it would "co-exist" with the live-action Spider-Man films; though Sony soon stated that the film would "exist independently of the projects in the live-action Spider-Man universe", as it is set in an alternate universe from those films, without the version of Spider-Man as seen in the Marvel Cinematic Universe (MCU).

In December 2015, Sony moved the film's release date to December 21, 2018. Bob Persichetti was chosen to direct that month, following engagement with Sony about a failed film based on Playmobil toys. By June 2016, Lord had written a full script. Miller said the film would feel different from previous Spider-Man films, and would "stand on its own as a unique film-going experience". It was also "rumored" to focus on the Miles Morales version of Spider-Man, which Sony confirmed at a presentation for its upcoming animated films in January 2017. Peter Ramsey had joined the film as a co-director at the end of 2016, after frequently working alongside Persichetti. In February 2017, Alex Hirsch was named as a story contributor and Christina Steinberg replaced Tolmach as a producer; she previously collaborated with Ramsey on Rise of the Guardians (2012) while at DreamWorks Animation. In April, the release date was pushed up one week from December 21, 2018, to December 14, 2018. Lord and Miller announced the film's full title in December and said that multiple Spider-Men would appear in the film. By then, Rodney Rothman, who had previously co-written the screenplay for Lord and Miller's 22 Jump Street (2014), was added as a co-director. Rothman was initially added as a writer on the script, fulfilling duties Lord was unable to do due to commitments to Solo: A Star Wars Story (2018) and other projects, and as production progressed he wished to be a director. As he was the only co-writer Lord would "fully endorse", and since it was typical that writers would be involved in editorial processes with directors, Rothman wanted to fulfill a role "beyond this".

=== Writing ===
The script is credited to Lord and Rothman from a story by Lord, making it the first film Lord had written without Miller. As six Spider-Man films had been made already, the team agreed they first needed to decide why this one needed to be made; their answer was to tell the story of Morales, who had yet to appear in a film. Brian Michael Bendis, co-creator of Miles Morales, consulted on the film adaptation. The first full cut of animatics and storyboards for the film was over two hours long, which is uncommon for animated films. The directors attributed this mostly to Lord and Miller, and their approach of adding as many elements to the film as they could at the outset, with the intention of seeing what it could "handle"; and then shaping the film from there. They said that the final runtime would be between 90 and 120 minutes, the standard length of an animated film. They added that a balance would have to be found between the expectations of an animated film that will have a large audience of children, and the requirements of the story. The directors felt the plot was similar to the live-action Spider-Man films, especially due to the large number of characters in the film. One year prior to its release, Lord and Rothman opted to rewrite the story as they had to "figure out how to reshape sequences we had already boarded and animated and fold them in with new stuff". They also added that they had substantially rewritten the third act.

The film was originally set to feature a romance between Miles Morales and Spider-Gwen. While the idea was scrapped, Gwen was still featured prominently in the film, mostly due to the efforts of producer Christina Steinberg. By August 2018, the directors had considered what a potential post-credits scene for the film could be, given that audiences have come to expect them from Marvel films. At one point the writers wished to include a post-credits scene with cameos by all three live-action Spider-Man actors, Tobey Maguire, Andrew Garfield, and Tom Holland, but this was canceled as Sony felt such a moment at the time would cause confusion and be too risky. Holland recalled the scene was intended to include him as a passerby at a train station who says, "Hey, kid!" to Miles. In the original subplot, Miles was going to become Spider-Man from learning from an audio commentary featuring James Cameron and Tom Cruise. According to Bob Persichetti, Miguel O'Hara wasn't the only character Spider-Man considered to appear in post-credits scene. However, he was chosen due to the large fan disappointment around his absence as part of the main cast.

=== Casting ===
Shameik Moore was cast as Miles Morales in April 2017, along with Liev Schreiber as the film's then-unspecified main villain. A month later, Mahershala Ali and Brian Tyree Henry joined the cast as Morales's uncle Aaron Davis and father Jefferson Davis, respectively. That December, Lord and Miller said that an adult Peter Parker / Spider-Man would appear in the film as a mentor to Morales. Maguire, who played Spider-Man in the Sam Raimi films, was initially considered to be cast as this version of Spider-Man, but the idea was dropped so as not to confuse the audience with the concept of the "Spider-Verse". Jake Johnson was ultimately cast in the role in April 2018. It was also announced that the characters Green Goblin, Kingpin, and Prowler would also appear, with their designs based on the Ultimate Marvel comic series. Kathryn Hahn was cast as a female variant of Doctor Octopus called Olivia Octavius; earlier drafts for the film had the character's known male version as a The Big Lebowski (1998)-type of character, but Persichetti came up with changing the character's gender due to his kids being friends with Hahn's.

In June 2018, Sony confirmed further casting, including Schreiber playing Kingpin, Hailee Steinfeld as Spider-Gwen, Luna Lauren Vélez as Morales's mother Rio, and Lily Tomlin as Parker's Aunt May. A month later, Nicolas Cage (who was considered for the role of Green Goblin in the first Spider-Man film), John Mulaney and Kimiko Glenn were announced as the voices of Spider-Man Noir, Spider-Ham and Peni Parker, respectively. Chris Pine as the Peter Parker of Miles's universe and Oscar Isaac as Spider-Man 2099 were announced in November 2018. Pine was also involved in Ramsey's previous film, Rise of the Guardians. Lord and Miller explained that the alternate Spider-Man characters were chosen based on the comics they had read, as well as research they conducted on Marvel Comics, with the intention of including actual characters from the comics who "were as diverse as possible".

=== Music ===
Daniel Pemberton was announced as the film's composer in July 2018. A full soundtrack album was released by Republic Records on December 14, the day of the film's release, and was curated to represent what a teen like Miles Morales would listen to. Artists on the soundtrack include Jaden Smith, Nicki Minaj, Lil Wayne, Post Malone, Ty Dolla Sign, Juice Wrld, Swae Lee, Ski Mask the Slump God, Vince Staples, Thutmose, and the late XXXTentacion, who was marketed as a special guest on the Lil Wayne and Ty Dolla Sign song "Scared of the Dark". A separate album containing Pemberton's score was released by Sony Classical Records on December 17. On December 20, Sony Pictures Animation announced an extended play album, A Very Spidey Christmas, based on a throwaway joke at the beginning of the film and consisting of five Christmas songs performed by cast members Shameik Moore, Jake Johnson, and Chris Pine. The EP was released on digital platforms the next day.

Elliphant recorded the song "To the End" for the film, where it served as the introduction music for Spider-Gwen. The song was released as a single in January 2019 a month after the film was released.

=== Animation and design ===
The film's animation was handled by Sony Pictures Imageworks in Vancouver, who had handled nearly all of Sony Pictures Animation's prior films, as well as visual effects for all prior Spider-Man films. According to Lord and Miller, they wanted the film to feel like the viewer had "walked inside a comic book", and were excited about telling the story in a way they believed the live-action films could not. Persichetti concurred, feeling that animation was the best medium to honor the comics, allowing the production team to adapt 70-year-old comic art techniques for the film's visual language. It took around a year for two animators to create 10 seconds of footage that reflected the producers' vision; the animation work was created from there. During initial development, the directors worked with a single animator, Alberto Mielgo, to establish the film's look. Although Mielgo was let go by Sony before the movie had been significantly produced due to artistic differences, this number eventually grew to 60 animators during production. It became clear that they could not complete the film on time, so the crew was expanded further. The number had reached 142 animators by August 2018 and at one point reached 177 animators, the largest animation crew that Sony Pictures Imageworks had ever used for a film. Animation work was completed in October 2018.

The CGI animation for the film was combined with "line work and painting and dots and all sorts of comic book techniques", to make it look like it was created by hand, which was described as "a living painting". This was achieved by artists taking rendered frames from the CGI animators and working on top of them in 2D, with the goal of making every frame of the film "look like a comic panel". Lord described this style of animation as "totally revolutionary", and explained that the design combines the in-house style of Sony Pictures Animation with the "flavor" of comic artists such as Sara Pichelli (who co-created Miles Morales) and Robbi Rodriguez. The film's tone and visual style also drew influence from Japanese anime and manga works such as Hayao Miyazaki films and Akira (1988).

To make the film feel more like a comic book, it was animated without motion blur, instead using an older technique of 2D animation called motion smearing, as seen in the 1942 Looney Tunes short The Dover Boys. The frame rate varied between 24 images (animating on ones) and 12 images (animating on twos) per second, the latter case using the same image twice. The producers described the effect as making the animation "crunchy". Sometimes, the two frame rates would be used in the same scene, such as when Miles and Peter Parker swing through the forest; Miles was animated at 12 frames to show his inexperience while Peter was animated at 24 frame to give him smoother movement. With characters being held up for one, two and three frames, it made their motion look jittery, which was named stepped animation. To create depth of field, another technique was used: deliberately misaligned colors, as if the colors had been slightly misprinted, as happens with ink printing in real comics. Other methods to make the film look more like a comic were halftones and Ben-Day dots to create colors, tones and gradients, crisscrossed lines to create texture and shadows, Kirby Krackle to create the illusion of energy, motion lines to show movement, and onomatopoeia, words on the image, to represent sounds and motion.

Rather than using animation principles like squash and stretch, the animators came up with substitute versions, "so that in texture and feel it felt different, but it still achieved the same goal—to either feel weight or anticipation or impact or things like that." Different comic styles were emulated throughout the film for the different characters, with Gwen's animation based on the designs in her comics, Spider-Man Noir having a black-and-white color scheme, Spider-Ham being designed as "cartoony" as possible, and Peni Parker being based on Japanese anime and manga such as Sailor Moon. Former Disney concept artist Shiyoon Kim served as overall character designer, while Craig Kellman designed the exaggerated look for Spider-Ham. Justin K. Thompson served as production designer after having done so on the Cloudy with a Chance of Meatballs films for Lord, Miller, and Sony Pictures Animation. Danny Dimian, who had worked on both the 2002 Spider-Man film and the first Cloudy with a Chance of Meatballs film while at Imageworks, served as visual effects supervisor for the film. He compared the approach the company took with Spider-Verse to the 2000 film Hollow Man. Animation co-director Patrick O'Keefe said that committing fully to each Spider's unique art style was like "making five movies". In-universe comic-books in the film were designed as a combination of the artwork of Steve Ditko and John Romita Jr. Chris Pine's Peter Parker's cover was designed by Keith Pollard while Erik Larsen designed the cover for Jake Johnson's Peter Parker, and Miles Morales's co-creator Sara Pichelli also contributed art for the film.

The directors all felt that the film would be one of the few that audiences actually "need" to watch in 3D, due to the immersive nature of the animated world created, and the way that the hand-drawn animation elements designed specifically for the film create a unique experience; Persichetti described the experience as a combination of the effects of an old-fashioned hand-drawn multiplane camera and a modern virtual reality environment. One scene in Aaron Davis's apartment includes an image of Donald Glover in the background, which references Glover's part in fan campaigns to see a non-white version of Spider-Man, as well as a scene from the Community episode "Anthropology 101" where Glover's character of Troy Barnes wakes up in Spider-Man pajamas. Glover also portrayed Aaron Davis in Spider-Man: Homecoming and voiced Miles in the Ultimate Spider-Man television series.

== Themes ==
Spider-Man: Into the Spider-Verse explores several characters confronting fear, grief, and uncertainty through the idea of taking "a leap of faith." Throughout the film, Miles Morales struggles to find his identity and constantly feels like an outsider. He faces pressure from his father to succeed while also uncertain of his own purpose and talents. In addition to this, Miles feels inadequate compared to the more experienced Spider-People around him and doubts whether he can live up to the mantle of Spider-Man. Eventually, encouraged by his father's words and inspired by Peter B. Parker's advice, Miles resolves to take a "leap of faith," embracing both his identity and his role as Spider-Man. Peter B. Parker has been burdened by several tragedies that has left him cynical and bitter, including the collapse of his marriage and the death of Aunt May. Peter B. initially intends to sacrifice himself, believing he has little left to live for. However, Miles rejects this plan and sends Peter back to his own dimension, repeating Peter's own advice about taking "a leap of faith." This moment inspires Peter to confront his fears, attempting to repair his broken relationship with Mary Jane. Gwen Stacy has emotionally isolated herself after the death of her best friend, her universe's Peter Parker. Consumed by guilt, Gwen keeps others at a distance to avoid hurting others. Over the course of the film, however, her growing friendship with Miles allows her to open up again, reconnect with others, and slowly rediscover trust and belonging.

== Release ==
=== Marketing ===
A thirty-second sizzle reel from the film was shown at a Sony Pictures Animation presentation in January 2017, revealing that the film focuses on Miles Morales. Scott Mendelson at Forbes said the footage "looked incredible [sic] stylized and resembled a cross between an Alex Ross image and a psychedelic [comic] cover", but felt the most significant element of the presentation was the confirmation of Morales, meaning "2018 will offer another comic book superhero movie featuring a hero of color, during the same year as Marvel's Black Panther." A teaser trailer for the film debuted at the 2017 Comic Con Experience, and was then released online. Chris Cabin at Collider felt the trailer "looks much better than it ever needed to. The style and design that is on display ... is vibrant and immediately engaging on a visual level, showing a genuine sense of personality to the production." io9's Julie Muncy called the trailer's visual design "elegant" and "fresh", and highlighted the use of music by Vince Staples, which was also used for the Black Panther trailers.

The official trailer for the film was released online at the start of June 2018, and was praised by Chaim Gartenberg of The Verge for its "absolutely gorgeous" art style, also highlighting Miles and Gwen's appearances. For Cartoon Brew, Amid Amidi praised the trailer for focusing on drama rather than action, and for seemingly targeting "a slightly hipper, more urban, and teen-oriented crowd." He felt that animated films were usually focused on pleasing "all-ages, all-audiences," which marked this film as a "radical change for United States feature animation". Dani Di Placido of Forbes praised the trailer for inspiring interest in the Spider-Man property after several different incarnations of the character had appeared in films. He said it achieved this by leaning into the comic storyline of the Spider-Verse and having multiple versions of the character in one film, and by its "beautifully rendered" visuals, that differentiated it from other major animated films. Placido said, "it's nice to see a movie just go nuts and embrace the weirdness of comic books and their eternally shapeshifting storylines." The trailer generated 164 thousand conversations across social media platforms within a day of its release, and in three days had been viewed 44 million times, making the film one of Sony's most viral, alongside Sausage Party (2016).

Sony released a second trailer for the film in October 2018, ahead of a promotional panel at New York Comic Con where the first 35 minutes of the film were shown. Lord and Miller explained that they chose not to show clips from throughout the film because they would lack context for the audience, so instead aired an extended sequence for the presentation, even though it had some unfinished animation and music. At the time, Sony's film Venom was playing in theaters, featuring another extended clip from Into the Spider-Verse as a post-credits scene. The scene confirmed that the shared universe that Venom is part of is one of the universes connected within the "Spider-Verse" multiverse.

In November 2018, Sony launched Spider-Verse Web AR Experience, a mobile augmented reality experience created by 8th Wall and Trigger to run on Amazon Web Services. Inspired by the film, the AR experience allows users to include Spider-Man in photos they take of their environment. The film also received a $115 million promotional "boost" from various companies—one of the largest such campaigns for a Sony film—including the Ad Council, who included the film's characters in an anti-bullying campaign; McDonald's, with a unique Happy Meal TV spot created in the film's animation style, as well as a special "double height" Happy Meal box for Australian McDonald's locations, designed like a skyscraper that the characters can swing from; Synchrony Bank, as part of their "Save Like a Hero" campaign; Nike, who sold the Air Jordan shoes that Morales wears in the film; General Mills cereal; official toy lines from Hasbro; themed cruises with Genting Cruise Lines; a "comprehensive" social media-based campaign in China by Tencent QQ, a brand that can be seen in the film; and other technology partners eBay, Vodafone, Garmin, Adobe, and Wacom.

On December 21, 2018, an unlockable costume based on the Spider-Man suit worn by the Peter Parker of Miles's universe was added to the PlayStation 4 video game Marvel's Spider-Man to promote the film. On December 29, Sony published the movie's screenplay online.

=== Theatrical ===
Spider-Man: Into the Spider-Verse was released by Sony Pictures Releasing under its Columbia Pictures label on December 14, 2018. In April 2015, Sony had made its first official announcement that an animated Spider-Man film was in development, with a release date scheduled for July 20, 2018. It is the first animated Spider-Man feature film, and is independent of the timelines of other Spider-Man universe films. At the end of 2015, the release date was changed to December 21, 2018, and was moved up by one week two years later. Sony premiered the film at the Regency Village Theater in Los Angeles on December 1, 2018, and included tributes to Stan Lee and Steve Ditko. The film is dedicated to the memories of the creators of Spider-Man, Stan Lee and Steve Ditko, who both died in 2018.

=== Home media ===
Spider-Man: Into the Spider-Verse was released on digital download by Sony Pictures Home Entertainment on February 26, 2019, with Blu-ray, Ultra HD Blu-ray, and DVD releases following on March 19. All releases were accompanied by a short film featuring Spider-Ham entitled Caught in a Ham. An extended cut called the Alt-Universe Cut, featuring 30 minutes of unreleased footage, including some scenes with Miles's roommate, Ganke, and a deleted cameo with Tom Cruise and James Cameron, was also featured on its home video release. Spider-Man: Into the Spider-Verse was also released in Blu-ray 3D format in several regions, outside of the United States and United Kingdom, on April 10, 2019.

In the United Kingdom, it was aired on Sky Cinema Premiere in 2019. It drew 1.1 million viewers, making it the year's eighth most-watched film on pay TV channels.

In April 2021, Sony signed a deal with Disney giving them access to their legacy content, including Spider-Man: Into the Spider-Verse and its sequels, to stream on Disney+ and Hulu and appear on Disney's linear television networks. Disney's access to Sony's titles would come following their availability on Netflix. Into the Spider-Verse had previously been available on Starz and FX. The film became available on Disney+ in the United Kingdom, Australia and Japan on June 17, 2022, and on September 9, 2022 in Latin America and Europe.

== Reception ==
=== Box office ===
Spider-Man: Into the Spider-Verse grossed $190.2 million in the United States and Canada, and $204.6 million in other territories, for a total worldwide gross of $395 million, against a production budget of $90 million. On January 31, 2019, the film surpassed Hotel Transylvania 2 to become Sony Pictures Animation's highest-grossing film domestically, unadjusted for inflation.

In the United States and Canada, Into the Spider-Verse was released on the same weekend as Mortal Engines and The Mule, and was projected to gross $30–35 million from 3,813 theaters in its opening weekend. It made $12.6 million on its first day, including $3.5 million from Thursday night previews, and went on to debut to $35.4 million, finishing first at the box office and marking the best ever December opening for an animated film. The film made $16.7 million in its second weekend, finishing fourth, behind newcomers Aquaman, Bumblebee and Mary Poppins Returns, and then $18.3 million in its third weekend, finishing fourth again. In its fifth weekend the film made $13 million, finishing in fourth for a third straight week. On March 1–3, the weekend following its Best Animated Feature win at the Academy Awards, the film was added to 1,661 theaters (for a total of 2,104) and made $2.1 million, marking a 138% increase from the week before.

=== Critical response ===
On Rotten Tomatoes, the film has an approval rating of 97% based on 399 reviews, with an average rating of 8.8/10. The website's critical consensus reads, "Spider-Man: Into the Spider-Verse matches bold storytelling with striking animation for a purely enjoyable adventure with heart, humor, and plenty of superhero action". It is the best-reviewed superhero film on the website. On Metacritic, the film has a weighted average score of 87 out of 100 based on reviews from 50 critics, indicating "universal acclaim". Audiences polled by CinemaScore gave the film a rare grade of "A+" on an A+ to F scale, and those at PostTrak gave it a 90% overall positive score, an 80% "definite recommend," and a 5 star rating.

David Ehrlich of IndieWire gave the film a "B+" and called it "hilarious and ultimately even poignant", writing, "An eye-popping and irreverent animated experience from the marvelous comic minds who brought you 21 Jump Street… Into the Spider-Verse is somehow both the nerdiest and most inviting superhero film in a long time; every single frame oozes with fan service." Oliver Jones of The New York Observer gave the film 3.5 out of 4 stars and wrote, "The greatest triumph and biggest surprise of the film is that it is an LSD freak-out on par with 2001: A Space Odyssey". Johnny Oleksinski of the New York Post gave the film a 3.5 rating out of 4, hailing it as "the best stand-alone film to feature the iconic character so far", and praising Miles's characterization as "more fleshed out than the usual Marvel heroes". Christy Lemire of RogerEbert.com praised the film's atmosphere and visual effects, adding that it "has a wonderfully trippy, dreamlike quality about it." Todd McCarthy of The Hollywood Reporter wrote, "the freshest and most stimulating aspect of the film is the visual style, which unites the expected Marvel mix of 'universes' (it used to be assumed there was only one universe in creation) with animation that looks both computer-driven and hand-drawn, boasts futuristic as well as funky urban elements, moves the 'camera' a lot and brings together a melting pot of mostly amusing new characters."

William Bibbiani of TheWrap felt the film "represents some of the best superhero storytelling on the market", and that it "captures the sprawling inter-connectivity of comic-book universes in a way that no other feature film has", calling it the best Spider-Man film since Spider-Man 2. Justin Chang of the Los Angeles Times said that "What distinguishes Spider-Man: Into the Spider-Verse in the end is that it takes its mission seriously, even when it's being transparently silly." David Sims of The Atlantic said that the film "somehow, through sheer creative gumption, does something new in the superhero genre", particularly praising the use of comic book's "visual language" as well as the characters' dynamic, and felt that the "anarchic fingerprints" of producers Lord and Miller were "all over the movie". Katie Walsh of Tribune News Service said that the film is "unlike any other superhero or animated film that has come before", comparing the animation to "watching a comic book come to life", and feeling that the film "firmly exists in a post-Deadpool environment, where it seems the only fresh way into a century-old superhero is to skewer the tropes, make fun of the merchandising and acknowledge the cultural significance of it all in a cheeky and self-reflective manner". She added that Lord, who wrote the story and co-wrote the screenplay, was "the key to the balance of self-aware and sweet" present in the film.

=== Industry response and legacy ===
Actor Tom Holland, who plays Peter Parker / Spider-Man in the Marvel Cinematic Universe, praised Into the Spider-Verse as "one of the coolest films [he has] ever seen," and he would later reiterate his statement on the film in 2023, calling it "the best Spider-Man movie that's ever been made." Chris Pratt, who worked with Lord and Miller on The Lego Movie films, described it as an "emotionally moving, cutting edge, progressive, diverse, funny, meta, action-packed, silly, visually stunning masterpiece!" Comedian and actor Patton Oswalt, who worked with Lord and Miller on 22 Jump Street (2014) and appeared on Marvel's Agents of S.H.I.E.L.D. (2013–2020), called the film "brilliant," and continued, "This has been a non-stop year for me and I'm glad I'm ending it in such a cinematic high-note. Not only is it the best superhero film ever made, it's flat-out a game-changing MOVIE. Seeing it again tomorrow!" Kevin Smith reviewed the film on his podcast Fatman Beyond, stating, "I always liked Spider-Man but this movie made me love Spider-Man on a Batman-type level," and continued, "It just goes to show you that any character in the right hands can be a transformative experience." Barry Jenkins, writer and director of the Academy Award-winning film Moonlight (2016, which also starred Ali), praised the film, calling it "magnificent" and citing it as the best Spider-Man film, one of the best films of 2018, and the best tentpole film since Edge of Tomorrow (2014). Jenkins continued, saying, "I was stupefied. I mean just tremendous, tremendous work, so grounded and full of verve; visceral. Saw it on the biggest screen I could find, just a viscerally enthralling experience. I salute you." Rian Johnson, writer and director of Star Wars: The Last Jedi (2017), described the film as "the Velvet Underground of superhero movies", believing it will be an influential film. James Gunn, writer and director of Guardians of the Galaxy (2014), has named Into the Spider-Verse his favorite superhero film. Marvel Studios president and MCU producer Kevin Feige said that he "loved it." Many other filmmakers including Edgar Wright, Guillermo del Toro, Yance Ford, and RaMell Ross have listed the film as one of their favorites of 2018.

The film's success influenced other projects using a mixed 2D and CGI animation style. The animation techniques created for Into the Spider-Verse were notably reused for The Mitchells vs. the Machines (2021), another Sony Pictures Animation film that Lord and Miller co-produced, and similarly influenced the animation style for DreamWorks Animation's The Bad Guys franchise (2022–present) and Puss in Boots: The Last Wish (2022). Directors Adil El Arbi and Bilall Fallah said Spider-Verse inspired them to create the hand-drawn style of visual effects for the live-action MCU series Ms. Marvel (2022). Mitchells co-director Jeff Rowe also cited the film as a major influence for his directorial debut Teenage Mutant Ninja Turtles: Mutant Mayhem (2023), claiming that it "showed that a movie can look like the concept artwork and can be critically and financially successful. That opened a lot of doors and I think we tried to take that football and run with it on 'Mitchells,' and then on 'Turtles.'" The film was similarly cited as an inspiration for the animation of the Marvel/Disney series Moon Girl and Devil Dinosaur and Netflix Special Entergalactic (2022).

During a special lecture at Takarazuka University, anime director Yoshiyuki Tomino commented on the film's Best Animated Feature win at the Academy Awards: "At first glance, it looks like a live-action film, and it's very experimental in various places. For American filmgoers, it may be their first time watching an animated film that isn't expressly for kids. I won't appraise the film's quality, but on a technical level, I can see how much hard work the staff put into it." He also expressed a belief that the anime industry should strive to surpass Into the Spider-Verse and other high-profile American animated features.

Director Kemp Powers, who would later co-direct the sequel Spider-Man: Across the Spider-Verse (2023), watched an early cut of the movie with the crew of Pixar's Soul (2020) and said that despite Pixar being "a tough crowd" when judging animation, they were quickly impressed and agreed that the movie would revolutionize the medium.

Kambole Campbell of the BBC praised it, and called it and its sequel Across the Spider-Verse "the greatest comic book movies ever made", IndieWire listed it as the 4th greatest animated films of the 21st century, and Collider named it one of the 10 essential animated movies, praising it for redefining the standards of modern animation.

Ben Travis of Empire listed the film as the greatest animated feature on its "50 Best Animated Movies" list; the site's review lauded the film's reinvention of animation and comparing the film's influence to Pixar's Toy Story (1995).

=== Accolades ===
Spider-Man: Into the Spider-Verse won Best Animated Feature Film at the 76th Golden Globe Awards, and won the same award at the 24th Critics' Choice Awards and the 91st Academy Awards, among several other awards and nominations. It was the first non-Disney or Pixar film to win Best Animated Feature since Rango (2011), becoming the 6th non-Disney/Pixar film to win the award. It was similarly successful at the 76th Golden Globe Awards, the 72nd British Academy Film Awards, and the 46th Annie Awards.

Spider-Man: Into the Spider-Verse appeared on many critics' top ten lists. According to Metacritic it appeared in first place on 5 lists. Critics at New York Magazine listed it at 9 on their list of the best films of the decade. In December 2021, the film's screenplay was listed number seventy-one on the Writers Guild of America's "101 Greatest Screenplays of the 21st Century (So Far)".

== Franchise ==
=== Sequels ===
Following the "incredible buzz" of Into the Spider-Verse, Sony began development on a sequel, which was later split into two films. Into the Spider-Verse was followed by Across the Spider-Verse, released on June 2, 2023. It surpassed the box-office take of Into the Spider-Verse, and received similar acclaim from critics and audiences. The third film, Beyond the Spider-Verse, is scheduled to be released on June 18, 2027.

=== Spin-offs ===
In 2018, Sony announced a spin-off animated film based on the Spider-Women comics, focusing on three generations of female Spider-related characters, including Spider-Gwen, Jessica Drew / Spider-Woman, and Cindy Moon / Silk. Bek Smith is attached as a screenwriter and Lauren Montgomery was in talks to direct. Lord and Miller were confirmed to be producing the film in April 2021, when the project was undergoing rewrites. Pascal and Arad reaffirmed that the film was in development in May 2023, when Arad said it would be made sooner than expected, while Steinfeld expressed interest in the film.

John Mulaney jestingly expressed interest in a potential spin-off film starring Spider-Ham, suggesting its plot as a "Watergate-like story" along the lines of The Post or All the President's Men while focusing on his character's career as a reporter.

In February 2026, it was confirmed that both a Spider-Punk and a Spider-Gwen spin-off were in active development.

=== Possible television series ===
Following the release of Into the Spider-Verse, the studio discussed the possibility of television series featuring the characters. Lord and Miller both expressed interest in seeing a series of shorts starring Spider-Ham, while Sony was announced to be developing animated spin-off TV series focusing on various characters. By April 2019, Lord and Miller signed a five-year deal with Sony Pictures Television to create animated Marvel television series alongside Sony Pictures Animation, including a possible TV series based on Into the Spider-Verse. Discussing these series in August 2019, Miller could not update where or when the series would be released but said there would be several live-action series and that they would each be "their own unique experience" while still being related to each other.
