= International Cinematographers Guild =

Entertainment industry labor union

- International Cinematographers Guild Local 600
- Abbreviation: ICG
- Nickname: IATSE Local 600
- Predecessor: Locals 644, 659, 666
- Founded: 16 May 1996
- Headquarters: 7755 Sunset Blvd. Hollywood, CA 90046
- Locations: United States; Canada
- Members: 8400
- National President: John Lindley
- National Vice President: Jamie Silverstein
- Parent organization: International Alliance of Theatrical Stage Employees
- Affiliations: AFL-CIO, CLC
- Website: www.icg600.com

The International Cinematographers Guild (IATSE Local 600) represents approximately 8,400 members who work throughout the United States, Canada and the rest of the world in film and television as cinematographers, camera operators, camera assistants (1st AC, 2nd AC), digital imaging technicians, still photographers, and all members of camera crews.

== History ==
The first cinematographers union, International Alliance of Theatrical Stage Employees Local 644 was established in New York in 1926, followed by unions in Los Angeles and Chicago, but it wasn't until 1996 that Local 600 was born as a national guild. In 2015 the Guild chose Rebecca Rhine as its first female executive director.

== Archive ==
The International Cinematographers Guild Interview Collection is housed at the Academy Film Archive. The collection contains nearly 300 oral and visual history interviews.

== ICG Magazine ==
The official publication of the guild was the International Cinematographers Guild Magazine (ICG Magazine). First published in February 1929 as the International Photographer, it changed its name to ICG Magazine in 1999. Its current executive director is David Geffner, who previously worked in postproduction for Paramount Pictures and The Walt Disney Company, and in story creation for Walt Disney Animation. Film professor Jack Anderson praised ICG Magazine, saying that it "can compete with American Cinematographer", which is the "standard journal for the technical end of the industry." ICG Magazine ceased publication in December 2025, with the guild deciding to "transition toward new ways of connecting with members".
