= The Boxtrolls =

2014 Laika film

- Theatrical release poster
- Directed by: Graham Annable; Anthony Stacchi
- Screenplay by: Irena Brignull; Adam Pava
- Based on: Here Be Monsters! by Alan Snow
- Produced by: David Bleiman Ichioka; Travis Knight
- Starring: Ben Kingsley; Isaac Hempstead Wright; Elle Fanning; Toni Collette; Jared Harris; Nick Frost; Richard Ayoade; Tracy Morgan; Simon Pegg
- Cinematography: John Ashlee Prat
- Edited by: Edie Ichioka
- Music by: Dario Marianelli
- Production company: Laika
- Distributed by: Focus Features (North America); Universal Pictures (International)
- Release dates: August 31, 2014 (Venice); September 26, 2014 (United States)
- Running time: 96 minutes
- Country: United States
- Language: English
- Budget: $60 million
- Box office: $111.9 million

The Boxtrolls is a 2014 American stop-motion animated steampunk fantasy comedy film produced by Laika. Loosely based on Alan Snow's 2005 novel Here Be Monsters!, the film was directed by Graham Annable (in his directorial debut) and Anthony Stacchi. It features the voices of Ben Kingsley, Isaac Hempstead Wright, Elle Fanning, Toni Collette, Jared Harris, Nick Frost, Richard Ayoade, Tracy Morgan, and Simon Pegg. Set in the fictional European country of Norvenia, the film tells the story of Eggs (Wright), a human boy raised by Boxtrolls—subterranean trolls who wear cardboard boxes—as he attempts to save them from being exterminated.

In 2008, Laika unveiled a slate of projects in development, including an animated feature film adaptation of Here Be Monsters!. While the animation technique was not yet decided upon, Stacchi was set to direct the film. Originally focused on all five species of creatures found in the original book, producer Travis Knight noted that the script ultimately was hollow with all the monsters. As the result, the team ended up focusing on the Boxtrolls as Knight thought there was something that was really compelling about that group of characters. Dario Marianelli composed the film's musical score.

The film was released in the United States on September 26, 2014, by Focus Features, and received generally positive reviews from critics, who praised the humor and animation. It earned $111 million on a $60 million budget and was nominated for Best Animated Film at the Academy Awards, the Golden Globes and the BAFTAs.

== Plot ==
In the hilltop city of Cheesebridge in the European country of Norvenia, rumors spread that Boxtrolls, subterranean trolls who wear cardboard boxes, have kidnapped and killed a baby. When the city's pest exterminator, Archibald Snatcher, tells the city's mayor, Lord Charles Portley-Rind, they strike a deal to allow Snatcher membership in the city's cheese-loving council, the White Hats, if Snatcher can exterminate every Boxtroll, despite that Snatcher secretly has severe lactose intolerance.

In reality, the Boxtrolls are peaceful and emerge from underground at night to scavenge for discarded items. The Boxtrolls’ leader, Fish, cares for the baby, who he has named Eggs. As Eggs grows up, Snatcher captures several Boxtrolls, leaving him distraught. One night after Lord Portley-Rind's daughter, Winifred, sees Eggs with Fish and another Boxtroll named Shoe, Snatcher captures Fish. Eggs sneaks to the surface to rescue Fish. He emerges in an annual fair to commemorate his disappearance, where he discovers the city's inaccurate portrayal of the Boxtrolls.

He follows Winnie, and she directs him to Snatcher's headquarters, located at an abandoned factory. Eggs rescues Fish, in the process Snatcher recognizes Eggs as the baby and reveals that he is forcing the captured Boxtrolls to build him a machine. Winnie, who covertly followed Eggs, overhears this exchange, helps Fish and Eggs escape from Snatcher and takes shelter with them in the Boxtrolls' caves.

Spurred on by Winnie for answers, Fish explains that Eggs' father was Herbert Trubshaw, a brilliant inventor who discovered that Boxtrolls were fellow inventors. Snatcher was a close friend of Herbert, but one night he asked Herbert to build something that could help him kill the Boxtrolls. However, knowing that the Boxtrolls were innocent, Herbert refused, so Snatcher threatened to take Eggs. During the struggle, Herbert gave Eggs to Fish to protect him before Snatcher seemingly killed Herbert by hitting Herbert on the head with a wrench. Winnie agrees to help Eggs tell her father the truth.

At a ball held to commemorate the purchase of a giant cheese wheel called the Briehemoth, Eggs tries to reveal his identity to Portley-Rind, but is confronted by Snatcher, who is disguised as a woman known as Madame Frou-Frou. While trying to avoid Snatcher, Eggs inadvertently knocks the cheese wheel into a river. He announces himself as the baby, but Portley-Rind does not believe him.

He tries to persuade the remaining Boxtrolls to flee, but unknowingly demoralizes them. Snatcher digs into their caves with his new exterminating machine and captures them all. Eggs awakens in a cage to discover that his father is still alive and imprisoned beside him. A combination of Snatcher hitting Herbert on the head and hanging Herbert upside-down for ten years has caused Herbert to lose his sanity. Eggs sees the Boxtrolls stacked in a crusher and begs them to stand up for themselves, but they are seemingly killed by the crusher.

Snatcher drives his machine to Lord Portley-Rind's house, shows him the flattened boxes as evidence of the Boxtrolls' extinction, and demands Portley-Rind's white hat in exchange for killing the final Boxtroll, which is actually Eggs disguised. The Boxtrolls, who have escaped from the crusher by leaving their boxes, arrive to free Eggs while Herbert reveals himself, causing Portley-Rind and the citizens to realize that Snatcher had lied to them. Snatcher tries to take Portley-Rind's hat by force while two of his henchmen, Mr. Trout and Mr. Pickles, decide to turn against him. Eggs and the Boxtrolls manage to disable the machine, which crushes Snatcher's right-hand man, Mr. Gristle, to death. Eggs and Snatcher land on the recovered Briehemoth, causing Snatcher to swell to a grotesque, monstrous size. Snatcher holds Winnie hostage and forces Lord Portley-Rind to give up his hat in exchange for her safety, but eventually explodes after eating a piece of a rare cheese.

Now that the townspeople know that Boxtrolls are peaceful, both sides agree to form a peaceful coexistence with each other. Herbert, recovering from his ordeal and wearing a box of his own, catches up with Eggs, who has stopped wearing a box, after being separated from his son for so long.

== Voice cast ==
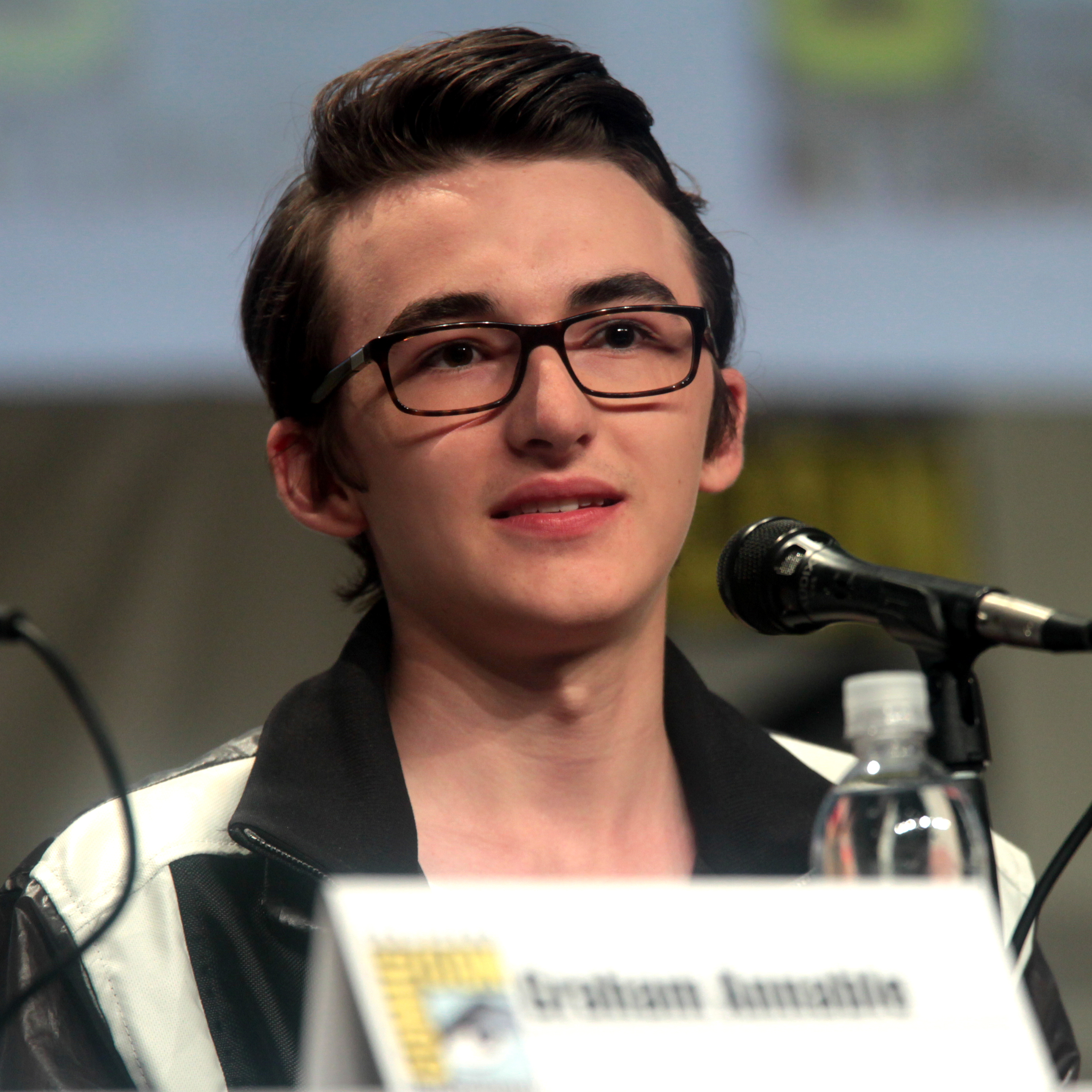
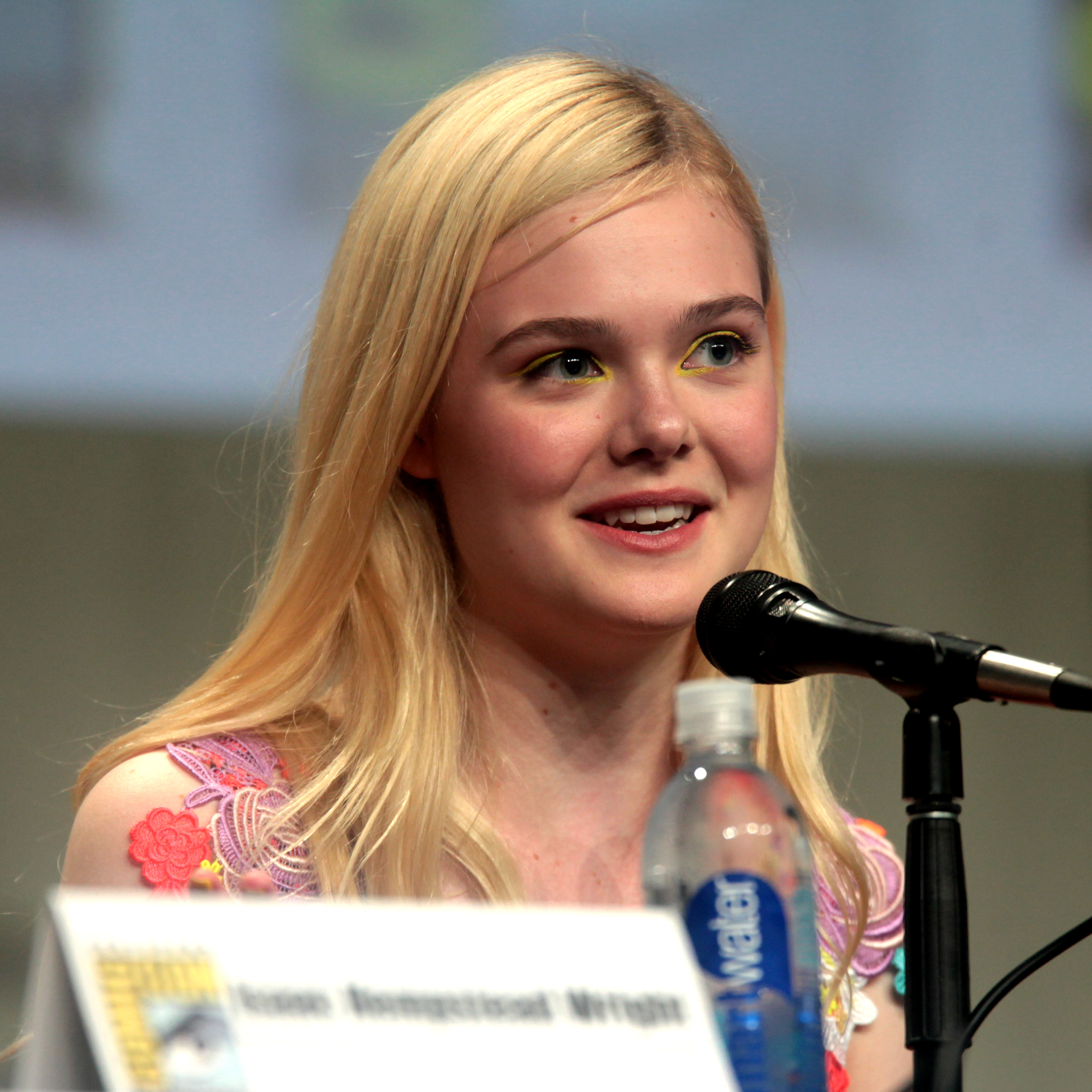
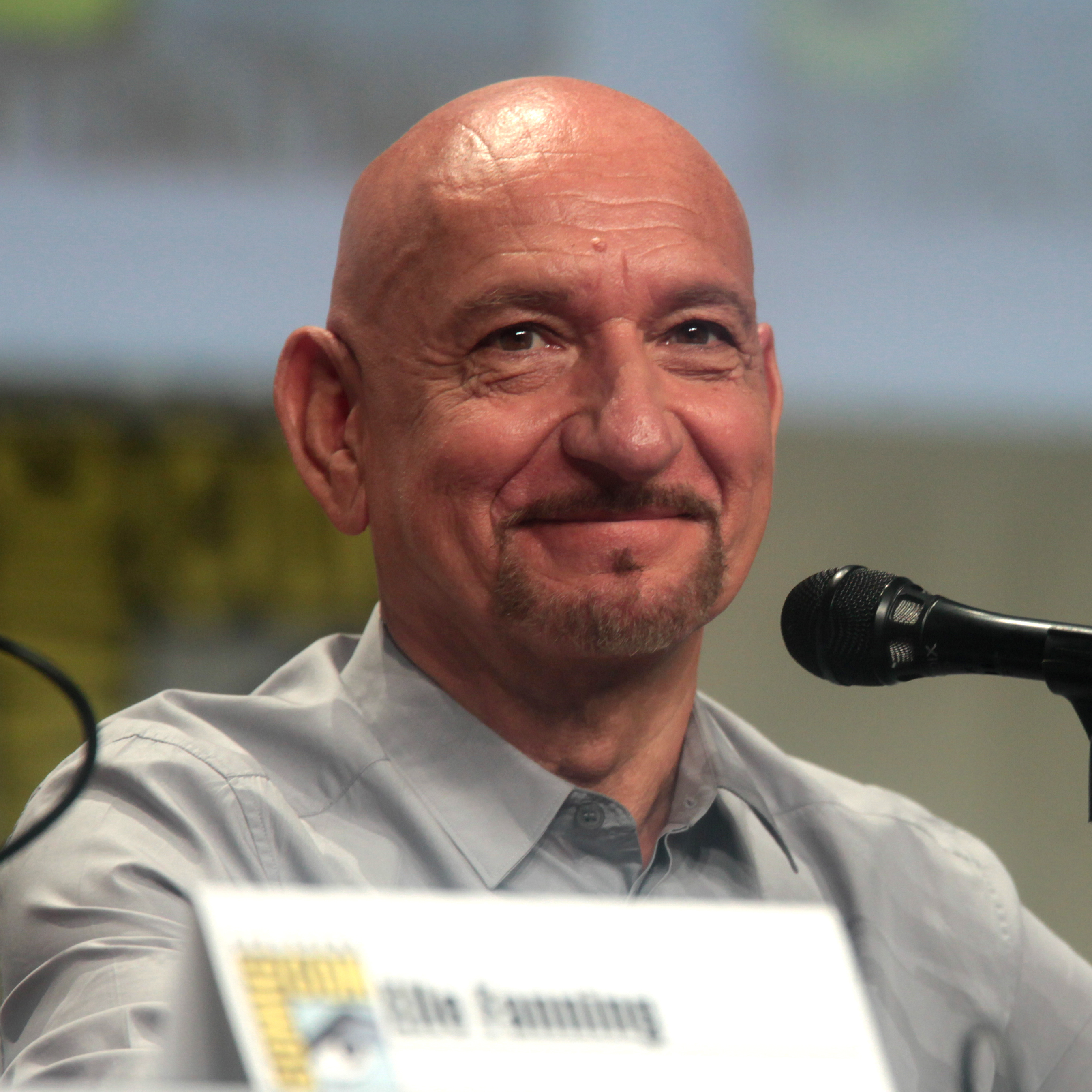
Isaac Hempstead Wright (Eggs), Elle Fanning (Winnie) and Ben Kingsley (Archibald Snatcher) promoting the film at the 2014 San Diego Comic-Con
- Isaac Hempstead Wright as Eggs Trubshaw, an orphaned 10-year-old human boy raised by the Boxtrolls, and the adoptive son of Fish
  - Max Mitchell as Baby Eggs
- Elle Fanning as Winifred "Winnie" Portley-Rind, Eggs's first human friend and the 10-year-old daughter of Lord and Lady Portley-Rind
- Ben Kingsley as Archibald Snatcher, a ruthless pest exterminator who wants to become a member of the White Hats despite having severe lactose intolerance.
- Dee Bradley Baker as Fish, Wheels, and Bucket, three Boxtrolls. Fish is the gentle yet skittish adoptive father of Eggs.
- Steve Blum as Shoe and Sparky, two Boxtrolls
- Jared Harris as Lord Charles Portley-Rind, Winnie's father, the leader of the White Hats, and the mayor of Cheesebridge
- Toni Collette as Lady Cynthia Portley-Rind, Winnie's mother and Lord Portley-Rind's snobbish wife
- Nick Frost as Mr. Trout, Snatcher's corpulent, and intellectual employee
- Richard Ayoade as Mr. Pickles, Snatcher's tall, and well-meaning employee
- Tracy Morgan as Mr. Gristle, Snatcher's diminutive, and maniacal second-in-command
- Simon Pegg as Herbert Trubshaw, an eccentric inventor and Eggs' biological father

== Production ==
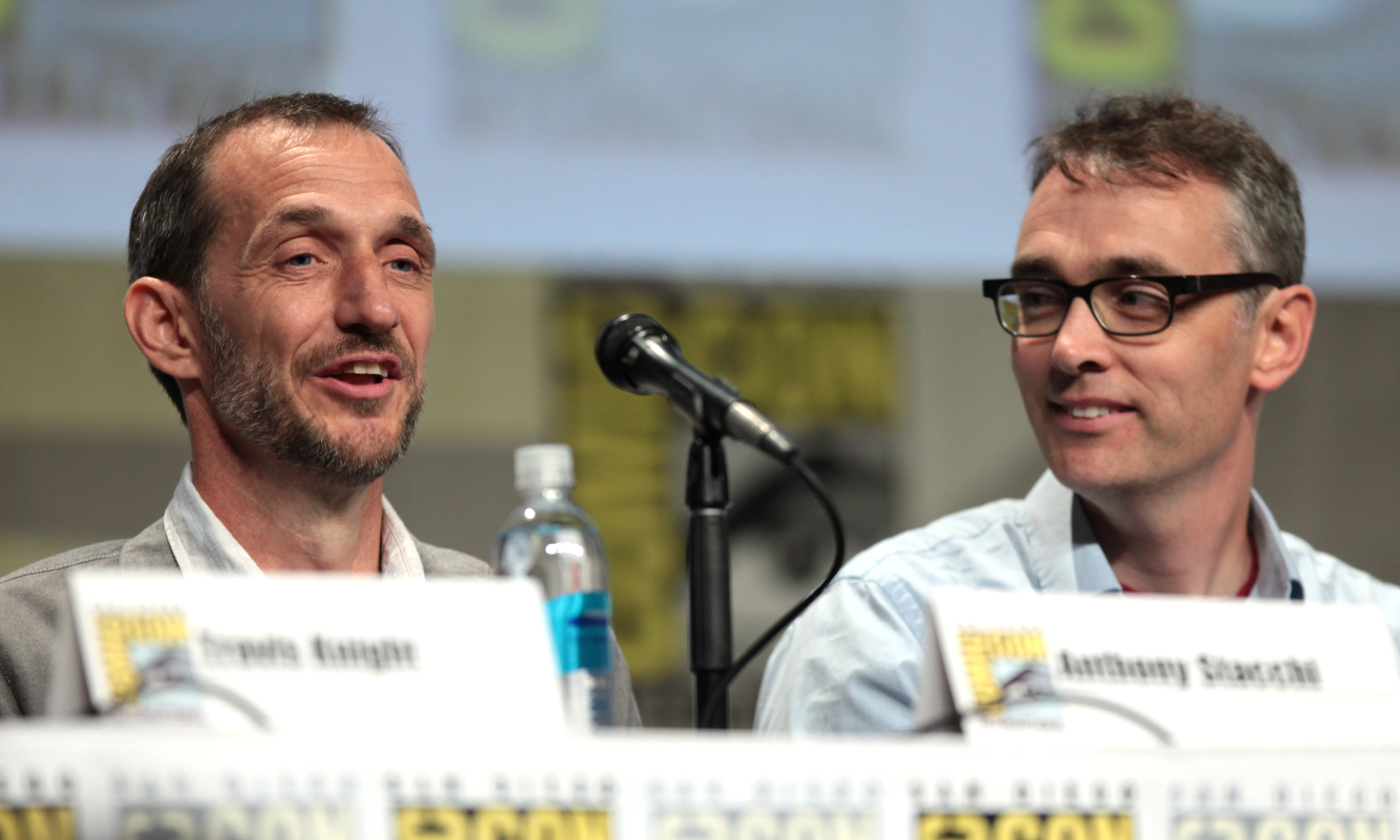
Directors Anthony Stacchi and Graham Annable promoting the film at the 2014 San Diego Comic-Con

In June 2008, Laika unveiled a slate of projects in development, among which was also an animated feature film adaptation of the 2005 Alan Snow novel Here Be Monsters!, eventually to become The Boxtrolls. The animation technique was not yet decided upon, but Anthony Stacchi was set to direct the film. The film was briefly considered to be done at DreamWorks Animation, but the studio thought the book was too dark to tackle as a film.

Laika announced on February 7, 2013, that the adaptation would be their next 3D stop-motion feature, under the title The Boxtrolls. Directed by Stacchi and Graham Annable, Laika CEO Travis Knight noted that the biggest challenge of the film was to condense a 550-page novel down to a 90-minute film. Initially the film focused on all five species of creatures found in the original book, but Knight noted that the script "ultimately was hollow" with all the monsters, and that "it didn't really have anything to say." The team ended up focusing on the Boxtrolls as Knight thought "there was something that was really compelling about that group of characters".

Crafting the film in stop motion was a lot of hard work upon the challenges and tone of the concept art by Mike Smith. One of the biggest puppets within the film was the Mecha-Drill which was a team effort to craft as both a prop and a set for the third act.

== Release ==
On February 7, 2013, Focus Features originally set the film for an October 17, 2014, release, In May 2013, the release date was changed to September 26, 2014. Focus Features holds worldwide distribution rights to The Boxtrolls, and Universal Pictures International released the movie overseas (with eOne Distribution handling Canada).

On June 11, 2014, two new trailers, one for the US and one for the UK, were released by the studio. The film premiered at the Venice Film Festival on August 31, 2014.

=== Home media ===
The Boxtrolls was released on DVD, Blu-ray and Blu-ray 3D on January 20, 2015, by Universal Pictures Home Entertainment, a new edition from Shout! Factory under license from Universal was released on Blu-ray on August 31, 2021, and then on Ultra HD Blu-ray on February 28, 2023.

== Video game ==
A platformer game called The Boxtrolls: Slide N' Sneak was developed for iOS by RED Games.

== Music ==
On December 4, 2013, composer Dario Marianelli was hired to score The Boxtrolls, the first animated feature film of his career. On August 30, 2014, it was announced that Back Lot Music would release a soundtrack album for the film on September 23, 2014.

== Reception ==
=== Box office ===
The Boxtrolls grossed $50.8 million in North America and $61.1 million in other territories, for a worldwide total of $111.9 million, against a budget of $60 million.

In the United States and Canada, it earned $17.2 million in its opening weekend from 3,464 theaters, debuting at number three at the box office behind The Equalizer and The Maze Runner. It had a strong 3.5x weekend multiplier off its $4.9 million opening day, which is more front-loaded than Coraline (3.8x) but played much less front-loaded than ParaNorman (3.11x). It set the record for the biggest opening weekend for Laika surpassing 2009's Coraline ($16.8 million), and the second biggest for a stop-motion animation film behind Laika's 2005 co-production, Corpse Bride ($19.1 million).

In other territories, The Boxtrolls earned $5.1 million from 1,806 screens in 16 countries in its opening weekend. In terms of total earnings, its largest markets are the United Kingdom and Ireland ($13.8 million), Australia ($5.8 million), and Mexico ($5 million). It is Laika's highest-grossing film overseas, surpassing ParaNorman's $51.1 million.

=== Critical response ===
On review aggregator Rotten Tomatoes, the film holds an approval rating of 78% based on 174 reviews, with an average rating of 7.2/10. The site's critical consensus states: "While it's far from Laika's best offering, The Boxtrolls is still packed with enough offbeat wit and visual splendor to offer a healthy dose of all-ages entertainment." On Metacritic, the film has a weighted average score of 61 out of 100 based on 37 critics, indicating "generally favorable reviews"—marked as the lowest-rated Laika film on the site. Audiences polled by CinemaScore gave the film an average grade of "B+" on an A+ to F scale, while PostTrak reported filmgoers gave it a 77% overall positive score and a 61% "definite recommend".

Tom Huddleston of Time Out gave the film three out of five stars, saying "Breathlessly paced and surreally funny, The Boxtrolls fizzes with visual invention and wild slapstick. But the grotesquerie is overbearing." Alonso Duralde of TheWrap gave the film a negative review, saying "A surprisingly charmless and aimless movie from Laika Studios, who previously crafted the wonderfully dark Coraline and ParaNorman, this latest venture seems destined to disturb young viewers while thoroughly boring their parents." Amy Nicholson of LA Weekly gave the film a B+, saying "The Boxtrolls is a kiddie charmer that makes you laugh, cower and think of Hitler. That's an unusual trifecta, but then again, this is an unusual film." James Rocchi of Film.com gave the film a 5.8 out of 10, saying "The Boxtrolls is a swing-and-miss for Laika; when you move forward with revolutionary techniques while standing still in terms of your themes, stories and settings, no amount of technical trickery or animation genius can bring the boring to vivid life." Jake Coyle of the Associated Press gave the film a positive review, saying "The Boxtrolls, despite a rather uncertainly structured story by screenwriters Irena Brignull and Adam Pava, has its pleasantly demented charms."

A. A. Dowd of The A.V. Club gave the film a B+, saying "In an age when most cartoon companies have traded pens for pixels, the magicians at Laika continue to create fantastically elaborate universes out of pure elbow grease." John Hartl of The Seattle Times gave the film three out of four stars, saying "Visually the film is a feast, stuffed with little jokes and surprises and the kind of black humor that Alfred Hitchcock heartily enjoyed." Brian Truitt of USA Today gave the film three out of four stars, saying "A delectable treat that balances themes of identity and class warfare with Monty Python-style political skewering, quirky humor and dairy jokes." Mick LaSalle of the San Francisco Chronicle gave the film two out of four stars, saying "One gets the sense that directors Anthony Stacchi and Graham Annable have their hearts in the action sequences and not in the characters, and that's a problem." Michael Phillips of the Chicago Tribune gave the film two out of four stars, saying "The Boxtrolls remains relentlessly busy up through its final credits, and it's clever in a nattering way. But it's virtually charmless." Michael O'Sullivan of The Washington Post gave the film three out of four stars, saying "The story of The Boxtrolls, in lesser hands, might have turned out only so-so. Under Laika's loving, labor-intensive touch, it takes on a kind of magic." Richard Corliss of Time gave the film a positive review, saying "The Boxtrolls has its penny-dreadful moments, but it's mostly a larkish stroll through a cemetery where the monsters are the good guys."

Ethan Gilsdorf of The Boston Globe gave the film a positive review, saying "Like one of its wondrously designed steampunky contraptions, The Boxtrolls is a marvelous thing to behold, and watch spin, even if it doesn't go anywhere terribly interesting." Bruce DeMara of the Toronto Star gave the film three and a half stars out of four, saying "From Laika, the animation studio that brought you such memorably quirky classics as Coraline and ParaNorman comes another totally offbeat and original tale for kids (and adults) looking for something a little more challenging and completely off the wall." Rafer Guzmán of Newsday gave the film two-and-a-half stars out of four, saying "The Boxtrolls has moments of humor and imagination, but American children may not be its ideal audience." A. O. Scott of The New York Times gave the film a positive review, saying "In The Boxtrolls, old-fashioned stop-motion animation is combined with new-style 3-D cinematography to charming effect." David Rooney of The Hollywood Reporter gave the film a mixed review, saying "There's a crucial shortage of heart here, from the messy storytelling to the hit-or-miss humor and unattractive visuals." Steve Persall of the Tampa Bay Times gave the film a D, saying "The Boxtrolls is a visually repellent pile of stop-motion animation, populated by grotesques and filmed in the palette of an exhumed casket's interior. It can frighten small children and bore anyone, with its cracked, cackled British wit." Joe Neumaier of the New York Daily News gave the film two out of five stars, saying "Kids who get a kick out of the macabre will enjoy this exquisitely crafted but tedious film."

Malcolm Lamont, one of the animators who worked on the film stated that "I like it as a movie. It's arguably not the best they've made, but it's fun. I wish there was more trolls and less old white cheese eating men."

=== Accolades ===
List of Awards and Nominations
Year	Award	Category	Recipients	Results
2014	San Francisco Film Critics Circle Award	Best Animated Feature		Nominated
2014	42nd Annual Annie Awards	Best Animated Feature		Nominated
2014	42nd Annual Annie Awards	Animated Effects in an Animated Production	Rick Sevy, Peter Vickery, Kent Estep, Peter Stuart, Ralph Procida	Nominated
2014	42nd Annual Annie Awards	Character Animation in a Feature Production	Travis Knight	Nominated
2014	42nd Annual Annie Awards	Character Animation in a Feature Production	Malcolm Lamont	Nominated
2014	42nd Annual Annie Awards	Character Animation in a Feature Production	Jason Stalman	Nominated
2014	42nd Annual Annie Awards	Character Design in an Animated Feature Production	Mike Smith	Nominated
2014	42nd Annual Annie Awards	Directing in an Animated Feature Production	Anthony Stacchi & Graham Annable	Nominated
2014	42nd Annual Annie Awards	Production Design in an Animated Feature Production	Paul Lasaine, Tom McClure & August Hall	Won
2014	42nd Annual Annie Awards	Storyboarding in an Animated Feature Production	Julian Narino	Nominated
2014	42nd Annual Annie Awards	Storyboarding in an Animated Feature Production	Emanuela Cozzi	Nominated
2014	42nd Annual Annie Awards	Voice Acting in a Feature Production	Sir Ben Kingsley (as Archibald Snatcher)	Won
2014	42nd Annual Annie Awards	Voice Acting in a Feature Production	Dee Bradley Baker (as Fish)	Nominated
2014	42nd Annual Annie Awards	Writing in an Animated Feature Production	Irena Brignull & Adam Pava	Nominated
2014	72nd Golden Globe Awards	Best Animated Feature		Nominated
2015	Academy Awards	Best Animated Feature		Nominated
2015	Critics' Choice Awards	Best Animated Feature		Nominated
2015	Producers Guild of America	Best Outstanding Producer of Animated Theatrical Motion Pictures	David Bleiman Ichioka and Travis Knight	Nominated
2015	Saturn Awards	Best Animated Film		Nominated
2015	13th Visual Effects Society Awards	Outstanding Animation in an Animated Feature Motion Picture	Travis Knight, Anthony Stacchi, Graham Annable, Brad Schiff	Nominated
2015	13th Visual Effects Society Awards	Outstanding Animated Character in an Animated Feature Motion Picture	Travis Knight, Jason Stalman, Michael Laubach, Kyle Williams for "Archibald Snatcher"	Nominated
2015	13th Visual Effects Society Awards	Outstanding Created Environment in an Animated Feature Motion Picture	Curt Enderle, Rob DeSue, Emily Greene, Jesse Gregg for "Boxtroll Cavern"	Nominated
2015	13th Visual Effects Society Awards	Outstanding Models in any Motion Media Project	Tom McClure, Oliver Jones, Raul Martinez for "Mecha-Drill"	Nominated
2015	13th Visual Effects Society Awards	Outstanding Effects Simulations in an Animated Feature Motion Picture	Kent Estep, Peter Stuart, Ralph Procida, Timur Khodzhaev	Nominated
