= Here Be Monsters! =

Novel written and illustrated by Alan Snow

- First edition
- Author: Alan Snow
- Illustrator: Alan Snow
- Language: English
- Series: The Ratbridge Chronicles
- Genre: Novel, Fantasy
- Publisher: Oxford University Press in Great Britain
- Publication date: 2005
- Publication place: United Kingdom
- Media type: Print
- Pages: 544
- ISBN: 978-0-689-87047-7
- OCLC: 61731239
- LC Class: PZ7.S6805 Her 2006

Here Be Monsters! is a children's novel written and illustrated by Alan Snow. Subtitled An adventure involving magic, trolls, and other creatures, it is presented as Volume I of "The Ratbridge Chronicles". It was first published in Great Britain in 2005 by Oxford University Press. It was published in the United States by Atheneum on 20 June 2006. The book includes over 500 black-and-white illustrations by Snow, originally executed in pen and ink.

The book has also been issued as a trilogy of shorter novels: Pants Ahoy!, The Man in the Iron Socks, and Cheese Galore!. These are subtitled Here Be Monsters Part 1, 2, and 3 (respectively). This should not be confused with the designation of the original single volume edition as being Volume I of "The Ratbridge Chronicles". The second book in the series, Worse Things Happen at Sea, was published in 2010.

An audiobook version was released in March 2010, narrated by Bill Wallis. The book served as a basis to the 2014 stop-motion animated film The Boxtrolls, produced from Laika Studios.

== Setting ==
Here Be Monsters! is set in—and below—the fictional English town of Ratbridge (based upon the Wiltshire town of Trowbridge), on the banks of the River Rat. A detail in one illustration suggests that it is set in or around the year 1803, and at least one character is depicted in clothing and wig reminiscent of that era; but Ratbridge is already so industrialised that certain industries have collapsed in the depletion of natural resources. Large electric generators, a product of the mid-19th century, are in operation, as are bicycles (developed in the 1880s). It presupposes the ready availability of cardboard boxes, an invention of the 1850s, and also of cardboard recycling programmes. Most notably, the technology for incandescent lighting, radio, television, heavier-than-air flight, and even virtual reality has been developed, albeit secretly.

== Plot ==
Protagonist Arthur lives with his adoptive grandfather, William, in the complex network of tunnels beneath Ratbridge, where William hides after he is unjustly accused of attempted murder. Arthur emerges at sundown in search of food, aided by a pair of hand-cranked mechanical wings. He also carries a doll – an effigy of his grandfather with wings – which serves as a walkie-talkie, allowing him to communicate with his grandfather. On one such expedition, Arthur witnesses an unlawful cheese hunt and follows the hunters and the captured cheeses back to the Cheese Hall. Arthur's wings are stolen, and he is almost captured by Snatcher, the leader of the once-powerful Cheese Guild. Arthur is rescued by Fish, a boxtroll, who takes Arthur to Willbury Nibble, the proprietor of a former pet shop called 'Here Be Monsters'. He shares his home with several boxtrolls (Shoe, Egg, and Fish) and a cabbagehead (Titus). Such creatures usually live underground and are collectively termed Underlings. Arthur's new friends intend to help him return to his grandfather, but quickly discover that all of the entrances to the tunnels have been sealed.

At the pet shop, a mysterious individual sells Willbury a number of miniaturised creatures and attempts (unsuccessfully) to buy their full-sized counterparts. Later, during a shopping trip, Willbury and Arthur are surprised to find that miniaturised Underlings are sold to Ratbridge's women as the latest fashion trend. They visit Willbury's friend, Marjorie: an inventor camped at the patent office, waiting for the return of a prototype of her latest invention. When they return to Willbury's shop, the place is a shambles and the Underlings are missing. While assessing the wreckage, they are visited by Kipper and Tom, members of the crew of the Ratbridge Nautical Laundry, soliciting customers. The Laundry has its headquarts on a ship that has become stuck in a canal and is staffed by men, rats, and crows. (Playing against stereotype, the rats are portrayed as intelligent, congenial characters who share leadership duties with the men. It is suggested that the crew were pirates before founding a laundry.) Several of the crew have also gone missing, and the others join the search for the Underlings. After seeing the Guild members leave on another irregular hunt, Arthur retrieves his wings and helps a number of Underlings (including his friends) to escape from the dungeon. They return to the Nautical Laundry, where corrupt police officers arrest Arthur and hand him over the Guild. The prisoner in his adjoining cell, Herbert, the Man in the Iron Socks, tells Arthur that the Guild is creating miniature creatures and helps Arthur to retrieve the keys to their cells from a sleeping guard.

Meanwhile, Willbury, Marjorie, and several members of the Laundry disguise themselves as boxtrolls and enter the Underground, where they locate Arthur's grandfather, but are caught in the traps used by the Guild to capture Underlings and are taken to the laboratory. Marjorie recognises an enlarged version of her stolen invention—now revealed to be a size transference device. A gigantic rat emerges from a pit in the middle of the floor, which the Laundry recognise as one of their missing comrades. Snatcher reveals that the Guild has been transferring the size of captured Underlings to "the Great One", and feeding him with the captured cheeses, to wreak vengeance on Ratbridge. Still believing her a boxtroll, the Guild transfers Marjorie's size to the rat, leaving her only seven inches tall. Arthur is then brought into the lab; but Herbert frees the captives and knocks a hole in the wall to allow their escape. Arthur again retrieves his wings—and Marjorie's prototype—and the group returns to the ship.

The Guild dress the Great One in armour; and the heroes return to the Cheese Hall to stop him. They activate a large electromagnet, which draws the iron armour toward the hall; whereupon the Great One explodes, covering the town in a layer of cheese. The shock wave triggers a collapse of the tunnels below the hall. Using the prototype size transference device, the miniaturised creatures are returned to their normal size. William clears his name, and he, Arthur, and Herbert take residence above the old pet shop.

== Underlings ==
Within the Here Be Monsters! universe several classes of fantastic creatures, although reclusive, are familiar to the human characters. These include the following:

- Boxtrolls are a subspecies of the common troll, who live inside cardboard boxes. They are fascinated by anything mechanical and will therefore steal almost any unsecured item. They are charged with the maintenance of the tunnels.
- Cabbageheads are small, human-like creatures that keep cabbages tied to their heads. They are led by a queen and their society has been likened to that of bees. Little else is known about them.
- Freshwater Sea Cows have traits common to both manatees or sea cows and dairy cows. They live in underwater tunnels as well as open water, and consume plants.

== Reception ==
The Guardian gave the book a good review as while the story gets more complicated, it later makes more sense and falls into place. Publishers Weekly gave it a starred review on the book as sprawling as it is silly. Kirkus Reviews praised the novel that delivers enough headlong, riotous adventure for an entire series.

== Film adaptation ==
In June 2008, Laika unveiled a slate of projects in development, among which was an animated feature film adaptation of the book. Anthony Stacchi was set to direct the film. It was briefly considered to be done at Dreamworks. Laika announced on 7 February 2013, that the adaptation would be their next 3D stop-motion feature under the title The Boxtrolls. The film, directed by Stacchi and Graham Annable, was released on 26 September 2014. Focus Features held worldwide distribution rights to The Boxtrolls, and Universal Pictures International released the movie overseas (with eOne Distribution handling Canada). The cast list includes Ben Kingsley as Archibald Snatcher, a pest exterminator; Toni Collette; Elle Fanning as Winnie, a human girl; Isaac Hempstead-Wright as Eggs, an orphan human boy; Jared Harris; Simon Pegg; Nick Frost; Richard Ayoade; Tracy Morgan; and Dee Bradley Baker and Steve Blum as the boxtrolls.
