= Althea Crome =

American knitter and miniaturist (born 1965)

- Born: 1965 (age 59–60)
- Occupation: Micro knitter
- Notable work: Miniature costumes for the movie Coraline
- Children: 4
- Website: www.altheacrome.com

Althea Crome (born 1965) is an American fiber artist who knits miniature items such as sweaters and socks. She is best known for her work on the 2009 animated stop-motion film Coraline. She knit sweaters and other clothing items for the puppets to wear on-screen.

== Biography ==
Crome started knitting in 2001. Although she originally made items at normal scale, she took it as a challenge to make smaller and smaller knitted items. She focuses on miniature items, especially garments such as sweaters. Her miniature sweaters can have over 80 stitches per inch (31 stitches per centimeter); sweaters made at a regular scale typically have around four stitches per inch (about 1.5 stitches per centimeter). She typically knits with fine silk thread on handmade needles. Commercially available knitting needles are not small enough for her work, so she makes her own needles out of surgical steel. Crome creates her own patterns and uses a magnifier to knit.

Althea Crome draws inspiration from Biblical scenes, Ancient Greek pottery, and paintings such as The Starry Night by Vincent van Gogh. Crome may use dozens of different colors in a single piece. Some of her knit pieces also contain intricate cabling. While some of Crome's pieces are inspired by existing artwork, she also makes her own designs based on events in her life. For example, she knitted a pair of socks that described her transition from living in Chicago to living in Indiana.

In 2006, Laika Studios contacted her to ask her to work on the costumes for Coraline. She first knitted leggings for Coraline, the titular character, which the studio did not end up using. However, they did end up using the 14 sweaters and six pairs of gloves she created for the character. She is credited as the "Knitwear Creator" for the film. At the time, she was working as a respiratory therapist. Later, in 2013, she quit her job to dedicate herself to knitting full-time.

Althea Crome's knitted pieces have been featured in museums such as the National Museum of Toys and Miniatures and the Kentucky Gateway Museum Center. One of her works, The Nativity, a miniature sweater with a design based on the birth of Jesus won third place for the 2017 Barbara Marshall Award for Artistic Achievement. She is a fellow of the International Guild of Miniature Artisans, which is dedicated to the creation of miniature art.

== Personal life ==
Crome lives in Bloomington, Indiana. She has four children.
