= Moon Girl =

Moon Girl may refer to:

- Moon Girl (EC Comics), a superhero from the Golden Age of Comics; real name is Claire Lune
- Moon Girl (Marvel Comics), a superhero from Marvel Comics and the partner of Devil Dinosaur; real name is Lunella "Nella" Lafayette
  - Moon Girl and Devil Dinosaur, a 2023 animated television series based on Marvel's comic

== See also ==
- Moongirl, a short film produced by Laika
