= Agent Seventeen =

2022 spy thriller novel

- Author: John Brownlow
- Language: English
- Genre: Thriller, mystery
- Published: November 2022
- Publisher: Hodder & Stoughton
- Publication place: United Kingdom
- Media type: Print (hardcover), e-book, audiobook
- Pages: 416
- Awards: Ian Fleming Steel Dagger Award
- ISBN: 978-1335449535
- OCLC: 1428270444
- Dewey Decimal: 813.6
- Followed by: Assassin Eighteen (2024)

Agent Seventeen (also known as Seventeen: Last Man Standing) is a 2022 spy thriller novel by writer John Brownlow about an assassin whose skills are unexplainable as he tackles his latest assignment in Berlin. It was published on November 2022 by Hodder & Stoughton. The novel won the Ian Fleming Steel Dagger award in August 2023.

== Premise ==
The novel follows an agent with no name, Agent Seventeen, as part of a secret agency of high-level operatives that span over a century, numbered by over one to the current one. However, when Agent Sixteen went rogue, Seventeen was ordered to track him and eliminate his target somewhere in Berlin.

== Reception ==
Travis Knight, director of Kubo and the Two Strings and Bumblebee, praised for the novel to be muscular and delighfully subversive with quick wit, a wicked sense of humor and feeling like a James Bond movie made by the Coen brothers.

Agent Seventeen holds an average rating score of 3.78 stars out of 5 for 97 reviews on the book tracking and recommendation website TheStoryGraph, with most reviewers calling the story plot driven and written for a younger audience.

Publishers Weekly praised the book, saying "Seventeen’s captivating voice helps carry the plot and mask some of its formulaic aspects and silliness.". Booklist awarded it a starred review while both The Book Reporter and The Arts Desk also raved about the novel.

== Sequel ==
A continuation novel, Assassin Eighteen, was released on April 2024.

== Film adaptation ==
On March 31, 2021, stop-motion animation Portland-based company Laika Studios announced a live-action adaptation of the novel by Brownlow, who’s a fan of Laika's previous work, as they opened a LA-based subsidiary called LAIKA Live-Action with the film being one of the first projects in their lineup.
