= Henry Selick =

American filmmaker (born 1952)

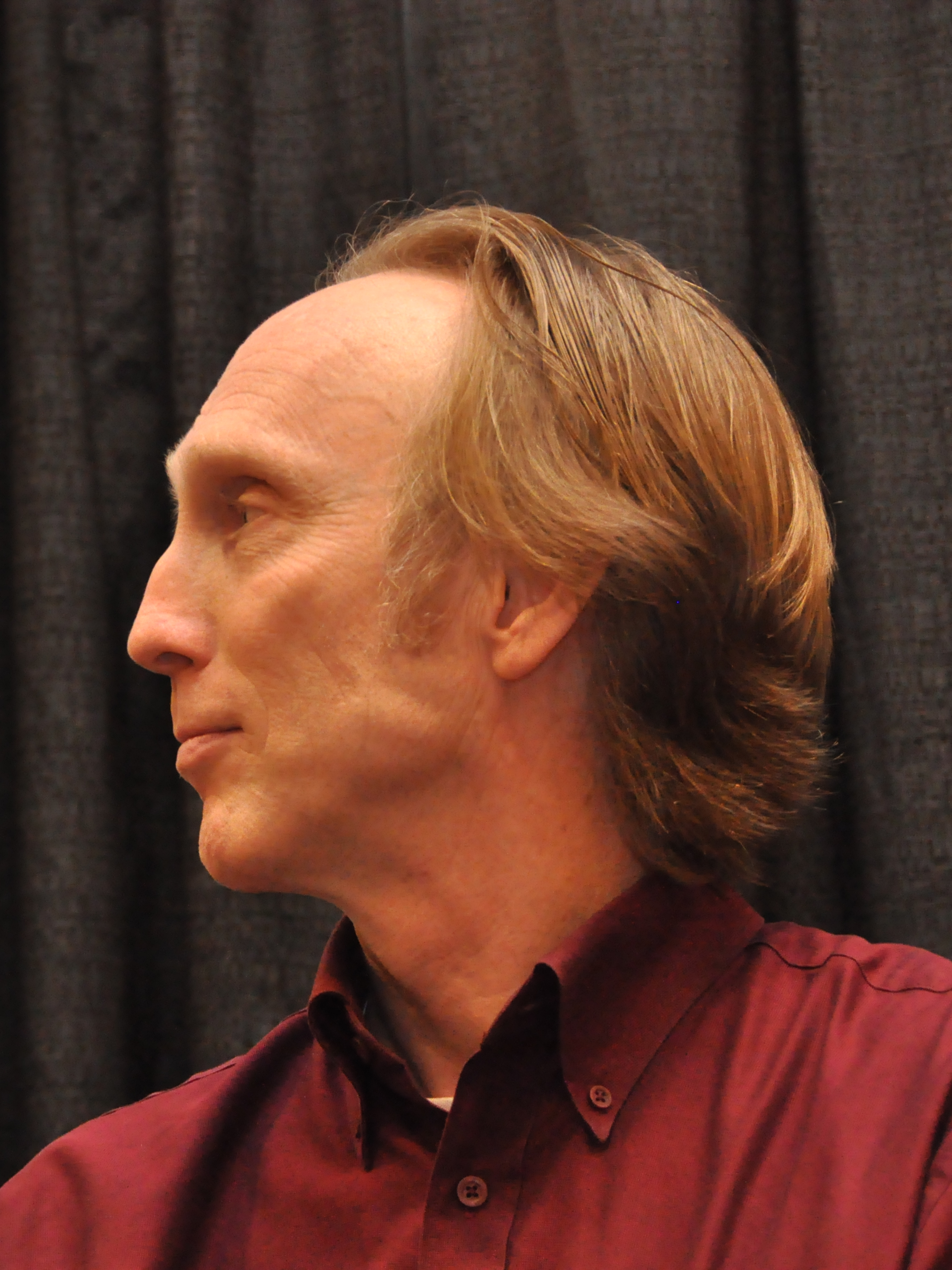
- Selick in 2009
- Born: Charles Henry Selick Jr. November 30, 1952 (age 73); Glen Ridge, New Jersey, U.S.
- Education: Rutgers University; Syracuse University; California Institute of the Arts
- Occupations: Filmmaker; stop-motion animator
- Years active: 1975–present

Charles Henry Selick Jr. (/ˈsɛlɪk/; born November 30, 1952) is an American filmmaker and animator. He is known for his pioneering work in stop-motion animation and for directing the films The Nightmare Before Christmas (1993), James and the Giant Peach (1996), Monkeybone (2001), Coraline (2009), and Wendell & Wild (2022). Selick has been recognized for his distinctively Gothic visual style, meticulous craftsmanship, metaphysical terror, with dark fantasy and surrealist elements describing his work as “scary films for brave children of all ages”, he is also known for his collaborations with the voice actor and story artist Joe Ranft as well as filmmaker Tim Burton. For Coraline, Selick received an Academy Award nomination for the Best Animated Feature.

== Early life and education ==
Charles Henry Selick Jr. was born on November 30, 1952, in Glen Ridge, New Jersey, the son of Melanie (née Molan) and Charles H. Selick. He was raised in Rumson. Selick drew a lot in his childhood. His fascination with animation came at a young age, when he saw Lotte Reiniger's stop-motion film The Adventures of Prince Achmed and the animated creatures of The 7th Voyage of Sinbad by Ray Harryhausen. He graduated from Rumson-Fair Haven High School in 1970.

After studying science at Rutgers University in New Brunswick for a year, he switched to an art major at Syracuse University. Selick enrolled at the California Institute of the Arts (CalArts) to study animation, becoming one of the first students to undertake the new Disney character animation program. He also studied experimental animation techniques under the guidance of Jules Engel. His two student films there, Phases and Tube Tales, won awards. He graduated from CalArts in 1977.

== Career ==
Selick worked on commercials, including working on the stop-motion animation for the Pillsbury Doughboy for some of the Pillsbury commercials.

=== Disney ===
After his academic studies, he went to work for Walt Disney Studios as an "in-betweener" and animator trainee on such films as Pete's Dragon and The Small One. During his time at Disney, he met and worked around many experienced filmmakers and animators, including Tim Burton. Burton served as producer on Selick's first two films as director, the Disney-produced The Nightmare Before Christmas and James and the Giant Peach. In 1996, he was set to direct the Disney-produced stop-motion film Toots and the Upside Down House, but was cancelled after the poor box office of James and the Giant Peach.

=== Further work (2000–2009) ===
Selick's third feature was Monkeybone (2001), a live-action/stop-motion adaptation of an underground comic, Dark Town by Kaja Blackley, produced by 20th Century Fox. The film was a commercial and critical failure. Selick later admitted his unhappiness with the final product and has since vowed never to make another live-action film again. Selick, who animated the fictional sea creatures in Wes Anderson's The Life Aquatic with Steve Zissou, signed on as animation director on Anderson's Fantastic Mr. Fox. In February 2006, Selick left the project, to work on Coraline for Laika. Selick, who kept in contact with Anderson, said the director would act out scenes in Fantastic Mr. Fox while in Paris and send them to the animators via iPhone.

In March 2005, Selick was set to direct the CGI film The Wall And The Wing for Vinton Studios, based on Laura Ruby's novel of the same name. Selick's first feature with Laika, LLC was Coraline, based on the novella Coraline by acclaimed fantasy author Neil Gaiman, and released in 2009. It was the first-ever stereoscopic 3D stop-motion animated film. The film received generally positive reviews from critics. Coraline was nominated for Best Animated Feature as an Academy Award, a BAFTA, and a Golden Globe.

Selick left Laika in 2009.

=== Work with Pixar ===
In 2010, Selick joined with Pixar and The Walt Disney Company in a long-term contract to exclusively produce stop-motion films. This not only returned Selick to his original roots, but also reunited Selick with numerous former friends and co-animators. His new studio, called Cinderbiter Productions, was self-described as "a new stop motion company whose mandate is to make great, scary films for young 'uns with a small, tight-knit crew who watch each other's backs."

Selick and Cinderbiter's first film under this deal, a project called ShadeMaker, was set to be released on October 4, 2013. In 2011, the film was green-lit for production and retitled The Shadow King. In August 2012, it was reported that, after spending a reported $50 million, Walt Disney Pictures canceled the project, due to "a creative and scheduling standpoint, the pic wasn't where it needed to be to meet its planned release date." Disney gave Selick the option to shop the project to another studio. Selick revealed in 2022 that the film suffered from interference from then-CCO of Pixar John Lasseter, who he claimed came in and constantly changed elements of the script and production that ended up ballooning the budget. Selick said that he had reacquired the rights for The Shadow King from Disney and that he may revive the project.

On April 28, 2012, it was announced that Disney had optioned the rights for Neil Gaiman's novel The Graveyard Book. Later that same day, it was announced that Selick would direct the film after work was completed on ShadeMaker. It was unknown if the adaptation would be live-action or stop-motion. After the studio and Selick parted ways over scheduling and development, it was announced in January 2013 that Ron Howard would direct the film.

In February 2013, it was reported in a press release by Selick that K5 International would be handling sales for The Shadow King at the European Film Market. It was unknown when the film would actually be released. In August 2016, a rep for Selick said the film was "in turnaround again" while Selick continued work on his other two projects: A Tale Dark and Grimm and Wendell and Wild.

On October 16, 2013, Selick announced a live-action film adaptation of Adam Gidwitz's children's novel A Tale Dark and Grimm.

On November 3, 2015, it was reported that Selick was developing Wendell & Wild, a new stop-motion feature with Jordan Peele and Keegan-Michael Key based on an original story by Selick. In 2018, the film was picked up by Netflix. The film was released on October 28, 2022, on Netflix.

=== Other projects ===
In June 2017, Selick was reported to direct the pilot and subsequent episodes of a Little Nightmares TV adaptation produced by the Russo brothers.

In June 2024, it was announced that Selick was developing a stop-motion film adaptation of Neil Gaiman's 2013 novel The Ocean at the End of the Lane, as well as reviving The Shadow King as a graphic novel. In August 2024, Selick implied The Ocean at the End of the Lane was back in limbo, saying that he hoped it would still happen, but he could not predict its future.

== Preservation ==
In 2012, the Academy Film Archive preserved several of Selick's short films: Phases, Seepage, and Tube Tales.

== Filmography ==
=== Short films ===
| Year | Title | Credited as | | | Notes |
| Year | Title | Director | Writer | Producer | Notes |
|---|---|---|---|---|---|
| 1975 | Tube Tales | Yes | Yes | Yes | |
| 1977 | Phases | Yes | Yes | Yes | |
| 1981 | Seepage | Yes | Yes | No | |
| 1991 | Slow Bob in the Lower Dimensions | Yes | Yes | Yes | |
| 2005 | Moongirl | Yes | Yes | No | Also voice actor |

=== Feature films ===
| Year | Title | Credited as | | | Notes |
| Year | Title | Director | Producer | Writer | Notes |
|---|---|---|---|---|---|
| 1993 | The Nightmare Before Christmas | Yes | No | No | |
| 1996 | James and the Giant Peach | Yes | Co-producer | No | |
| 2001 | Monkeybone | Yes | Executive | No | |
| 2009 | Coraline | Yes | Yes | Yes | Also production designer |
| 2022 | Wendell & Wild | Yes | Yes | Yes | |

=== Others ===
- Pete's Dragon (1977) (inbetweener)
- The Small One (1978) (animator)
- The Watcher in the Woods (1980) (designer of the alien)
- Twice Upon a Time (1983) (sequence director)
- Return to Oz (1985) (storyboard artist)
- Nutcracker: The Motion Picture (1986) (visual adaptation)
- MTV ID's: "Gravity", "Masks '87", "Dollhouse M", "Bath for Dad", "Haircut M", "Xerox Bug" (1987–1990)
- Who Framed Roger Rabbit (1988) (inbetweener)
- The Life Aquatic with Steve Zissou (2004) (animator)
