= Alan Snow =

English author and illustrator

- Born: 1959 (age 66–67); Kent, England
- Notable work: Here Be Monsters!

Alan Snow (born 1959 in Kent, England) is an English author and illustrator of children's literature. He is best known for his best selling novel Here Be Monsters! (2005), which was adapted into a stop-animation film by Laika under the name The Boxtrolls, released in 2014.

== Biography ==
Snow grew up in the county of Wiltshire and went on to study fashion design and illustration at the Salisbury College of Art. After college, he worked in variety of different jobs before becoming primarily an author and illustrator of children's books. Since then, he has illustrated over 160 books and worked on the art design of video games and animation movies as well. Moreover, he was involved in the design of children's science museum in Japan.

In 2005, Snow published his novel Here Be Monsters!, which he illustrated himself with over 500 drawings. The novel, which was also published in three separate volumes, is the first part of the Ratbridge Chronicles. The Ratbridge Chronicles are a series of novels and stories playing in the fictitious Victorian city of Ratbridge, in the underground of which the boxtrolls live. The second book of the series, Worse Things Happen at Sea, was published in 2010.

== Selected works ==
- Machines, Cars, Boats, and Airplanes (1989)
- Big Book of Knowledge (1992)
- The Monster Book of ABC Sounds (1994)
- The Truth About Cats (1995)
- What Color Is It? What Shape Is It? (1995)
- Here Be Monsters! (2005), part of the Ratbridge Chronicles
- How Santa Really Works (2007)
- Wacky Guide to Paper Fun (2007)
- How Dogs Really Work (2009)
- How Cats Really Work (2009)
- Worse Things Happen at Sea (2010), part of the Ratbridge Chronicles
- How Dinosaurs Really Work (2012)
- How Pirates Really Work (2013)
