= Isaac Hempstead Wright =

British actor (born 1999)

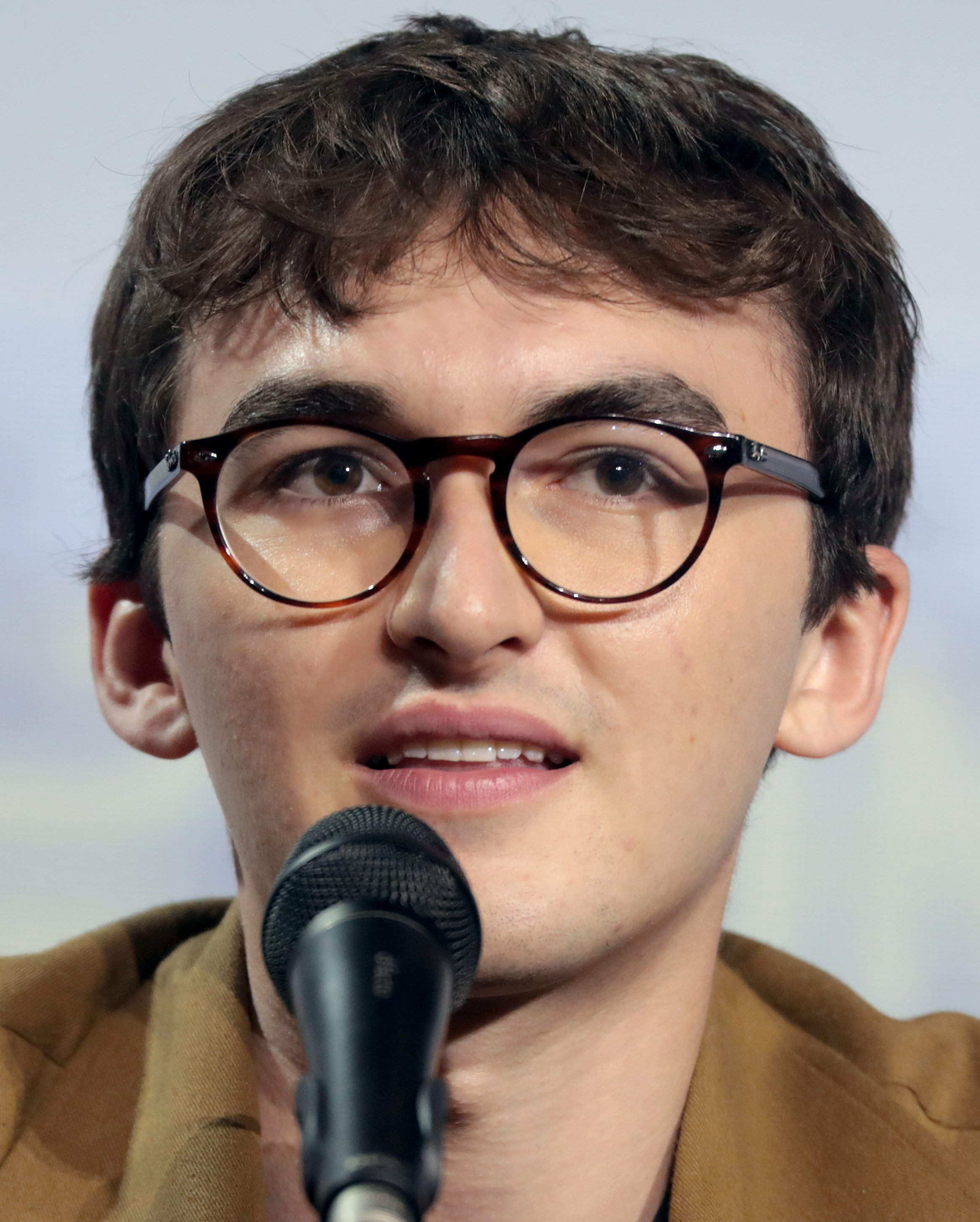
- Hempstead Wright at the 2019 San Diego Comic-Con
- Born: Isaac William Hempstead; 9 April 1999 (age 27); Surrey, England
- Education: University College London (BSc)
- Occupation: Actor
- Years active: 2011–present

Isaac Hempstead Wright (born Isaac William Hempstead on April 9, 1999) is an English actor and neuroscientist. He is best known for his role as Bran Stark in the HBO television series Game of Thrones (2011–2019), which earned him a Young Artist Award nomination as Best Young Supporting Actor in a TV Series. He also voiced Eggs in the 2014 animated film The Boxtrolls.

== Early life ==
Isaac Hempstead Wright was born in Surrey, England. His mother and father are both teachers, and his step-father runs a printing company. He studied at Queen Elizabeth's Grammar School, Faversham, Kent. He had no interest in acting until he joined a drama club to avoid playing football on Saturday mornings during the cold months of the year; he later studied acting at the Kent Youth Theatre in Canterbury.

== Career ==
Hempstead Wright began his acting career in commercials.

His big break was as Bran Stark in the hit television series Game of Thrones, which premiered in April 2011. He was part of the initial starring cast and remained a member of the starring cast for the second, third, and fourth seasons and was included in Screen Actors Guild Awards nominations as Outstanding Performance by an Ensemble in Drama Series at the 18th and 20th Screen Actors Guild Awards. He did not appear in season 5, but returned as part of the main cast in season 6 remaining through season 8, which premiered in April 2019, making Hempstead Wright one of a handful of Game of Thrones actors who remained on the show over its nine years of production.

Hempstead Wright's film debut was as Tom Hill in the horror film The Awakening (2011). He had a supporting role in the 2013 crime thriller Closed Circuit. Hempstead Wright also voice acted in the 2014 animated fantasy-comedy film, The Boxtrolls, a 2014 episode of the American TV show Family Guy, and Part 2 of the 2016 TV special Revolting Rhymes.

He appears in the Foals song "Exits" music video. In 2018, he was cast in the feature film The Blue Mauritius. The heist movie was expected to begin filming in Cape Town, South Africa in mid-2018 but has remained in pre-production. Hempstead Wright appeared in the sci-fi film Voyagers (2021).

== Personal life ==
Beginning in 2017, Hempstead Wright was a student at the University of Birmingham until dropping out early in order to focus on his acting career. In 2019, he returned to university to study neuroscience at University College London, saying that he intended to continue to act while doing so. He earned a BSc in neuroscience, and later authored a paper on "oculomotor changes in Progressive Supranuclear Palsy (PSP)".

In December 2019, Hempstead Wright, a secular humanist, became a patron of the humanist charity Humanists UK. On 24 October 2025, he announced on Instagram that he had married.

== Filmography ==
=== Film ===
Year	Title	Role	Notes
2011	The Awakening	Tom	
2013	Closed Circuit	Tom Rose	
2014	The Boxtrolls	Eggs	Voice
2021	Voyagers	Edward	

=== Television ===
Year	Title	Role	Notes
2011–2014; 2016–2019	Game of Thrones	Bran Stark	40 episodes
2014	Family Guy	Aidan (voice)	Episode: "Chap Stewie"
2016	Revolting Rhymes	Jack (voice)	Television film

== Awards and nominations ==
Year	Award	Category	Work	Result	Ref.
2011	Scream Awards	Best Ensemble	Game of Thrones	Nominated	
2011	Screen Actors Guild Awards	Outstanding Performance by an Ensemble in Drama Series	Game of Thrones	Nominated	
2013	TiBS Scifi Awards	Best Young Actor	Game of Thrones	Won	
2013	Young Artist Awards	Best Performance in a TV Series – Supporting Young Actor	Game of Thrones	Nominated	
2013	Screen Actors Guild Awards	Outstanding Performance by an Ensemble in Drama Series	Game of Thrones	Nominated	
2017	Screen Actors Guild Awards	Outstanding Performance by an Ensemble in Drama Series	Game of Thrones	Nominated	
2019	Screen Actors Guild Awards	Outstanding Performance by an Ensemble in Drama Series	Game of Thrones	Nominated	
