= Laika, LLC =

American stop-motion animation studio

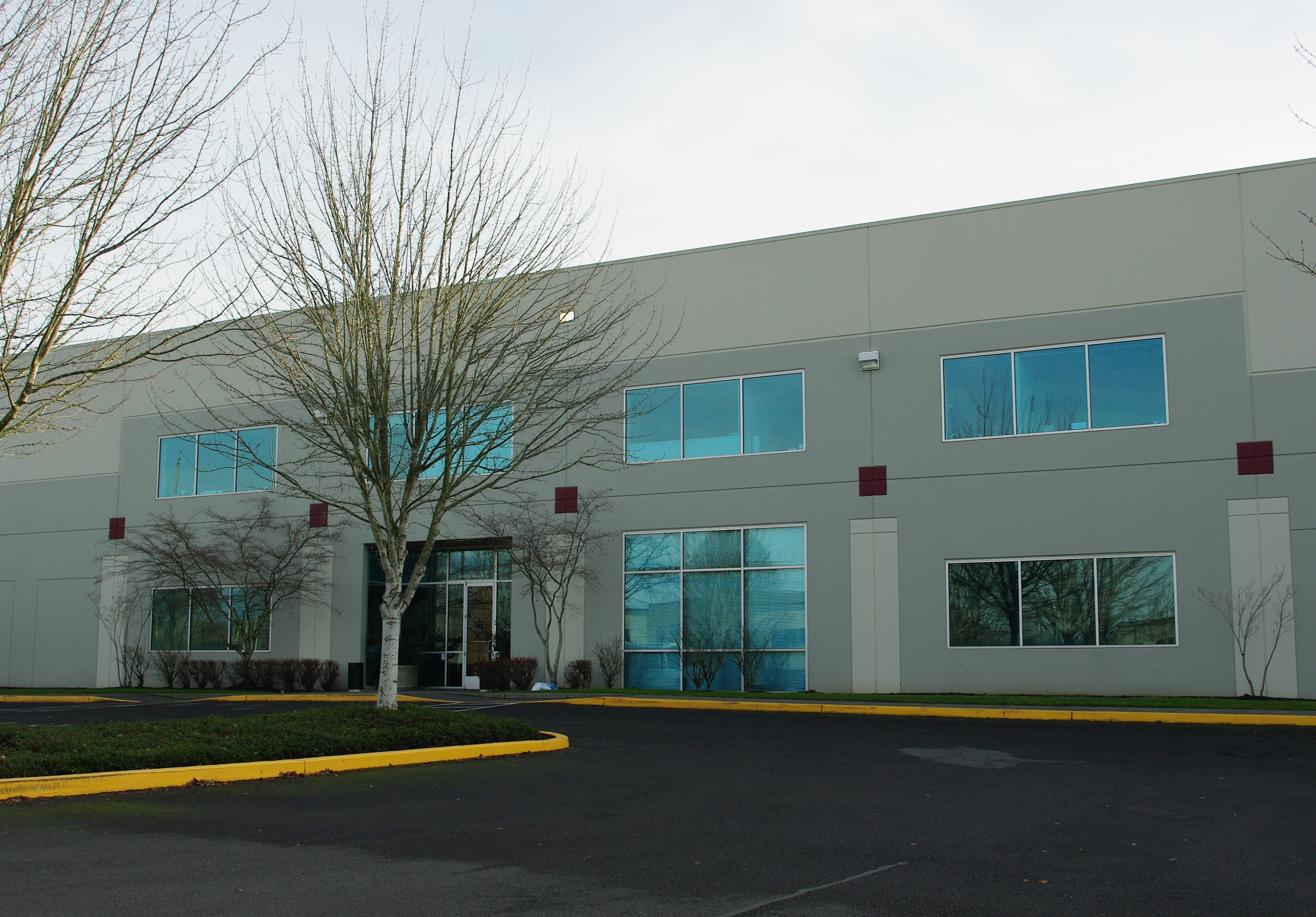
- Laika's headquarters in Hillsboro, Oregon
- Type: Private
- Industry: Animation, film production
- Genre: Stop-motion
- Predecessor: Will Vinton Studios
- Founded: July 20, 2005; 21 years ago
- Founders: Phil Knight; Travis Knight; Will Vinton
- Headquarters: Northeast Bennett Street, Hillsboro, Oregon, U.S.
- Key people: Phil Knight (chairman); Travis Knight (president & CEO); Matt Levin (president, Laika Live Action); David Burke (COO)
- Products: Films
- Owners: Phil Knight; Travis Knight
- Number of employees: 500 (2024)
- Subsidiaries: HouseSpecial (2005–2014); Laika Live Action
- Website: Official website

Laika, LLC is an American independent stop-motion animation studio owned by Nike co-founder Phil Knight and is located in Hillsboro, Oregon, part of the Portland metropolitan area, while Knight's son, Travis Knight, acts as Laika's president and CEO. The company is best known for its stop-motion feature films Coraline, ParaNorman, The Boxtrolls, Kubo and the Two Strings, Missing Link, and Wildwood, but also specializing in commercial content for all media, music videos, and short films.

Laika previously had two divisions, Laika Entertainment for feature films and Laika/house for commercial content, which was spun off by the studio in May 2014 to focus exclusively on feature film production. By July, the new independent commercial division is now called HouseSpecial.

The studio has a Los Angeles–based subsidiary called LAIKA Live Action, focusing on films in Live-Action with current projects in the works from Atmosphere, Crumble, Seventeen, Audition, Airman, and a film by Jon Spaihts, as well as going through television with Exit Party as their first foray.

In June 2026, Laika offically become a Certified B Corporation.

== History ==
In the late 1990s, Will Vinton Studios, known for its stop-motion films and commercials, sought funds for more feature-length films and brought in outside investors, which included Nike, Inc. owner Phil Knight, whose son Travis Knight worked at the studio as an animator. In 1998, Knight made his initial investment. In 2003, Phil Knight acquired the financially struggling Will Vinton Studios to pursue feature-length productions. The following year, Henry Selick, director of The Nightmare Before Christmas, joined the studio as a supervising director. In July 2005, Will Vinton Studios was rebranded as Laika – named after Laika, the dog sent to space by the Soviet Union in 1957.

It opened two divisions: Laika Entertainment for feature films and Laika/house for commercial work, such as advertisements and music videos. The studio also announced their first projects, the stop-motion film Coraline, direct by Selick, and the CGI animated film Jack & Ben's Animated Adventure.

By June 2008, Laika announced a list of projects in their slate, two of which includes ParaNorman, directed by Chris Butler, who wrote the film based on his original idea, with Sam Fell later joined to co-direct alongside Butler, and The Boxtrolls, based on Alan Snow's fantasy-adventure novel, Here Be Monsters!, and directed by Anthony Stacchi, with Graham Annable who also later joined to co-direct alongside Stacchi. However, the studio laid off a significant portion of its staff in December 2008, when its second planned feature, Jack & Ben's Animated Adventure, was cancelled before laying off more on September 2009 when their CGI department was shutdown due to the studio's exclusively on stop-motion. The following year, the studio released its first feature film, Coraline, but having been unsuccessful in renegotiating his contract, Selick departed Laika in October 2009. In May 2012, Laika announced Coraline producer Mary Sandell as head of production on all stop-motion projects. In May 23, 2014, Laika spun off its advertising portion to focus on feature film production exclusively.

Following the release of their third film, The Boxtrolls, it was announced on October 3, 2014, that Laika and Focus Features have made a pacted partnership for three more films including their next production announced in December 22, Kubo and the Two Strings, which marks the directorial debut of Laika's CEO Travis Knight. In March 2015, the company announced its intention to expand its studio space, aiming to produce one film per year. On February 1, 2016, Laika hired former NBCUniversal executive Brad Wald as Chief Financial Officer, replacing Gary Raksis after filling in when Alan Keith departed on December 2009. By September 26, 2018, Laika hired Michael Waghalter as head of business development to help build the studio's brand esteem through exhibitions at museums, pop-culture conventions and theme parks.

While it remains unclear if the deal with Focus Features has been scrapped after the release of Kubo and the Two Strings, or what will happen with the two remaining films left on that deal, their fifth film, Missing Link, was released on April 12, 2019 through Annapurna Pictures under United Artists Releasing. After its release, Laika hired David Burke as their first Chief Marketing Officer on September 2019 before being promoted as Chief Operating Officer on May 2023.

During the COVID-19 pandemic on August 2020, the studio lay off a few members for cost-saving measures, but would have intentions to rehire them if possible. On January 15, 2021, Ian Sheppard from Skydance Animation's SVP Development was hired as Head of Development for Laika Studios. On March 31, 2021, Laika opened an LA-based subsidiary division to focus on producing live-action films under its name LAIKA Live Action.

On November 28, 2022, longtime worker Jeff Stringer was promoted to Chief Technology Officer at Laika Studios.

=== Partnerships ===
On April 3, 2017, Laika hired company Striker Entertainment as their first worldwide agent on merchandising their characters from studio's animation catalogue.

On September 23, 2020, Laika struck a deal with Park Circus to handle repertory sales on its library.

As of February 1, 2021, Laika is funding a new stop-motion animation studio at Bowie State University, as the first to undertake a partnership to boost the college's animation curriculum and provide a direct pathway into the industry. On February 8, 2021, Laika signed a distribution deal with Shout! Factory for the United States, covering the studio's first four films.

In May 2024, it was announced that Laika: Frame x Frame, an exhibition showcasing "the art, science and innovative wizardry of the studio's epic films", would be hosted between August and October 2024 at BFI Southbank in London as part of a stop-motion season supported by the studio. In March 2026, Laika announced a partnership with The Gotham Film & Media Institute to launch a animation accelerator program to support early and mid-career animators, launching their first class on May 2026 to develop animated short films.

== Filmography ==
While most of their animated films are rated PG for family audiences, their sixth stop-motion animated film, Wildwood, based on the novel by Colin Meloy, and originally announced in 2011 after working on the book trailer, was the studio's first PG-13 rated film for mature audiences alike.

=== Films ===
Title	Release date	Director(s)	Writer(s)	Producer(s)	Executive Producer(s)	Composer	Co-production with	Distributor	
Title	Release date	Director(s)	Writer(s)	Producer(s)	Executive Producer(s)	Composer	Co-production with	United States	Worldwide
Coraline	February 6, 2009	Henry Selick	Based on the book by: Neil Gaiman Henry Selick	Bill Mechanic; Claire Jennings; Henry Selick; Mary Sandell	—N/a	Bruno Coulais	Pandemonium Films	Focus Features	Universal Pictures International
ParaNorman	August 17, 2012	Sam Fell; Chris Butler	Chris Butler	Arianne Sutner; Travis Knight	—N/a	Jon Brion	—N/a	Focus Features	Universal Pictures International
The Boxtrolls	September 26, 2014	Graham Annable; Anthony Stacchi	Based on the novel by: Alan Snow Irena Brignull; Adam Pava	David Bleiman Ichioka; Travis Knight	—N/a	Dario Marianelli	—N/a	Focus Features	Universal Pictures International
Kubo and the Two Strings	August 19, 2016	Travis Knight	Story by: Shannon Tindle; Marc Haimes Screenplay by: Marc Haimes; Chris Butler	Arianne Sutner; Travis Knight	—N/a	Dario Marianelli	—N/a	Focus Features	Universal Pictures International
Missing Link	April 12, 2019	Chris Butler		Arianne Sutner; Travis Knight	—N/a	Carter Burwell	—N/a	United Artists Releasing (under Annapurna Pictures)	AGC International
Wildwood	October 23, 2026	Travis Knight	Based on the book by: Colin Meloy and illustrated by: Carson Ellis Chris Butler	Travis Knight; Sam Wilson	David Burke	Dario Marianelli	—N/a	Fathom Entertainment	FilmNation Entertainment

=== Short films ===
Title	Release date	Director(s)	Writer(s)	Producer(s)	Executive Producer(s)	Composer	Distributor/co-production with
Moongirl	August 12, 2005	Henry Selick		Helen Kalafatic	Jeff Farnath	They Might Be Giants	—N/a
ParaNorman: The Thrifting	October 25, 2025	Thibault LeClercq	Chris Butler	Peter McCown	Travis Knight; Chris Butler	Robert Lydecker; Kevin Lax	Fathom Entertainment; Passion Pictures

=== Films in development ===
As of 2026, two original projects and a book-to-film adaptation are in the works from Travis Knight and Pete Candeland.

On April 27, 2022, a new Laika stop-motion film titled The Night Gardener was announced as being in the works, based on an original story by Ozark creator Bill Dubuque, with Knight set to direct. In June 2024, it was announced that Laika had acquired the rights to adapt Susanna Clarke's novel Piranesi into an animated feature film, to be directed by Knight. By September 9, 2024, an original film by Candeland was announced alongside Corpse Bride writer John August on June 2025 to develop a drama film inspired on an original idea from Candeland about a high school theatre-loving daughter finding her mother in a never-ending bacchanal.

Title	Director(s)	Writer(s)	Producer(s)	Ref(s)
The Night Gardener	Travis Knight	Bill Dubuque	TBA	
Piranesi	Travis Knight	Based on the novel by: Susanna Clarke Dave Kajganich	TBA	
Untitled film	Pete Candeland	Based on an idea by: Pete Candeland John August	TBA	

Additionally, Víctor Maldonado, Alfredo Torres, Chris and Justin Copeland, Chris Butler, and Sam Fell are working on animated films for the studio.

=== Unproduced projects ===
Title	Type	Description
Jack & Ben's Animated Adventure	Film	When Laika Entertainment opened, the first projects they announced were the stop-motion film Coraline and the CGI animated film Jack & Ben's Animated Adventure. Barry Cook would direct from a screenplay by David Skelly and with Ric Sluiter as the art director. The latter film was cancelled in 2008, which resulted in the closure of Laika's CGI film division. Characters from the scrapped film were used in a short film, The Mouse that Soared, with Laika served as an uncredited co-association company.
The Wall and the Wing	Film	Another unreleased CGI film project was The Wall and the Wing, the earliest reference to which dates back to 2005, before the publication of Laura Ruby's novel of the same name. Henry Selick was set to direct the film.
Untitled Halloween film	Film	Laika announced in 2008 of a origin film based on the holiday of Halloween with Henry Selick attached to direct and write the story with John Carls who also was set to produce.
Untitled comedy-adventure film	Film	In 2008, Laika announced a film written by british duo Dick Clement and Ian La Frenais based on an adult novel trilogy with Courtney Pledger and Sarah Radclyffe are attached as producers.
Little White Lie	Film	In 2010, it was announced that Jan Pinkava would be directing an original film for Laika, titled Little White Lie, with Chris McCoy as co-writer. Pinkava left Laika in 2011, effectively cancelling the film.
Untitled ParaNorman series	Television	There have been plans for a ParaNorman CGI sequel series, but nothing has come of the project.
Goblins	Film	In October 2012, it was announced that Laika was set to adapt Philip Reeve's book Goblins, with Mark Gustafson set to direct. No further updates were given, and Gustafson died in 2024.
Get Back	Film	Get Back would have been written by Chris McCoy, the plot is summarized as: "Two die-hard Beatles fans find a time machine and travel back in time to prevent John Lennon from ever meeting Yoko Ono, as they blame her for the Beatles' demise." The first mention of LAIKA's involvement with adapting the script came from an article by The Oregonian in 2019, stating that the indication of the studio's interest comes from court documents connected to a lawsuit filed the previous year in the state of California.
Toad Rage	Film	Laika was planning to make a CGI feature-length film based on the book Toad Rage by Morris Gleitzman.
Catch	Short	Catch was a planned short film from LAIKA, being created by the DDG.

=== Contract work ===
Title	Release date	Budget	Gross	Rotten Tomatoes	Metacritic	Note(s)
Corpse Bride	September 23, 2005	$40 million	$117.2 million	85% (200 reviews)	83 (35 reviews)	Directed by Mike Johnson and Tim Burton
They Might Be Giants - Bastard Wants To Hit Me	December 12, 2005	—N/a	—N/a	—N/a	—N/a	Music video Directed by Aaron Sorenson and Courtney Booker
Slacker Cats	August 13, 2007 – January 23, 2009	—N/a	—N/a	—N/a	—N/a	Television series
King of California	September 14, 2007	$10 million	$1.03 million	63% (67 reviews)	63 (22 reviews)	Animation sequences
The Mouse That Soared	November 7, 2009	—N/a	—N/a	—N/a	—N/a	Co-association (uncredited) and special thanks only; directed by Kyle T. Bell
A Very Harold & Kumar Christmas	November 4, 2011	$19 million	$36.2 million	68% (131 reviews)	61 (29 reviews)	Stop-motion/claymation sequence

== Reception ==
Title	Budget	Box office gross	Rotten Tomatoes	Metacritic
Coraline	$60 million	$185.9 million	91% (276 reviews)	80 (40 reviews)
ParaNorman	$60 million	$107.1 million	89% (190 reviews)	72 (33 reviews)
The Boxtrolls	$60 million	$108 million	78% (174 reviews)	61 (37 reviews)
Kubo and the Two Strings	$60 million	$77.5 million	97% (230 reviews)	84 (38 reviews)
Missing Link	$100 million	$26.6 million	88% (171 reviews)	68 (30 reviews)
Wildwood	$100 million	$75 million	97% (191 reviews)	87 (39 reviews)

=== Accolades ===
The studio has been nominated for various awards for their films including at the Academy Awards for Best Visual Effects on Kubo and the Two Strings, (as only the second animated film to receive that nomination, after The Nightmare Before Christmas), as well as winning a Golden Globe for Best Animated Feature from Missing Link, as well as the first non-CGI animated film to win in the category.

Title	Academy Award for Best Animated Feature	BAFTA Award for Best Animated Film	Golden Globe Award for Best Animated Feature	Annie Award for Best Animated Feature
Coraline	Nominated	Nominated	Nominated	Nominated
ParaNorman	Nominated	Nominated	—N/a	Nominated
The Boxtrolls	Nominated	Nominated	Nominated	Nominated
Kubo and the Two Strings	Nominated	Won	Nominated	Nominated
Missing Link	Nominated	—N/a	Won	Nominated
Wildwood	—N/a	—N/a	—N/a	—N/a

== LAIKA Live Action ==
On March 31, 2021, Laika opened an LA-based subsidiary called LAIKA Live Action and announced their first live-action film, based on the action thriller novel Seventeen by John Brownlow, a fan of Laika's previous work.

On February 7, 2023, the studio announced that former Netflix executive Matt Levin had been given the title of President, Live-Action Film & Series, and will oversee the studio's entire live-action output, reporting directly to Travis Knight. On May 23, 2023, Laika also signed Jeremy Kipp Walker as Executive Vice President of Live-Action Production and Chaz Salembier as Creative Vice President for LAIKA Live Action.

On July 23, 2024, Laika expanded its live-action division to television as the studio hired former Amblin Entertainment worker Alex Maggioni as Head of TV and veteran Zac Locke and Head of Business Affairs for Matt Levin.

=== Filmography ===
==== Films in development ====
As of 2026, there are four book-to-film adaptations and two original projects in the works from various studios.

On July 9, 2024, Laika announced an original live-action film Crumble, with Brian Duffield writing and directing and producing alongside Phil Lord and Christopher Miller, also fans of Laika's previous work, under their production company Lord Miller. In September 5, 2024, Laika acquired a original sci-fi thriller film from Dune writer Jon Spaihts.

By May 15, 2025, Laika bought the film rights to their next adaptation of Atmosphere with Captain Marvel directors Anna Boden and Ryan Fleck on board to direct, write and produce with author Taylor Jenkins Reid with Circle M+P joining co-production and Black Bear Pictures distrubing worldwide after buying the rights with Laika on September 24, 2026. In September 10, 2025, Laika acquired another film adaptation to Audition with Lulu Wang to direct, write and co-produce while Lucy Liu, and Charles Melton as signed to star in the film based on a novel by Katie Kitamura, who executive produces with Liu and VP Jeremy Kipp Walker, and co-produced with Higher Ground Productions.

By November 2026, LAIKA Live Action joined co-production with A24 on a WW2 war film Airman, directed by Ben Stiller and based on the 2016 non-ficiton novel by Seth Meyerowitz.

Title	Director(s)	Writer(s)	Producer(s)	Executive Producer(s)	Co-production with	Distributor	Status	Ref(s)
Atmosphere	Anna Boden; Ryan Fleck	Based on the novel by: Taylor Jenkins Reid Anna Boden; Ryan Fleck	Travis Knight; Matt Levin; Jeremy Kipp Walker; Anna Boden; Ryan Fleck; Taylor Jenkins Reid; Brad Mendelsohn	Maryse Knight; Zac Locke	Circle M+P; Black Bear Pictures	Black Bear Pictures	Filming	
Airman	Ben Stiller	Based on the novel by: Seth Meyerowitz with Peter Stevens Ben Shattuck; Ben Stiller	Ben Stiller; John Lesher; PJ van Sandwijk; Travis Knight; Matt Levin	Maryse Knight; Jeremy Kipp Walker; Zac Locke; Michael Lesslie; Marie Savare; Jake Gyllenhaal; Miki Emmerich; Richard Whelan; Seth Meyerowitz; Dan Bodansky; James Dixon	Le Grisbi Productions; Storyteller Productions; Red Hour Films; Nine Stories; A24	A24	Pre-production	
Seventeen	TBA	Based on the novel by: John Brownlow TBA	TBA	TBA	—N/a	TBA	In Development	
Crumble	Brian Duffield		Phil Lord; Christopher Miller; Aditya Sood; Brian Duffield	Lucy Kitada; Nikki Baida	Lord Miller Productions	TBA	In Development	
Untitled film	Jon Spaihts		TBA	TBA	—N/a	TBA	In Development	
Audition	Lulu Wang	Based on the novel by: Katie Kitamura Lulu Wang; Martyna Majok	Vinnie Malhotra; Anikah McLaren; Travis Knight; Matt Levin; Lulu Wang	Lucy Liu; Katie Kitamura; Jeremy Kipp Walker	Local Time; Higher Ground Productions	TBA	In Development	

=== Television ===
==== Series in development ====
In March 2026, LAIKA Live Action acquired its first television series based on the novel Exit Party by Emily St. John Mandel with Emma Stone and Dave McCary executive producing under their company Fruit Tree.

Title	Creator(s)/Developer(s)	Co-production with	Network/Streaming Service	Ref(s)
Exit Party	Based on the novel by: Emily St. John Mandel TBA	Fruit Tree	TBA	

== See also ==
- List of companies based in Oregon
- Arthouse animation
- American independent cinema
