= Coraline (film) =

2009 film by Henry Selick

- Theatrical release poster
- Directed by: Henry Selick
- Screenplay by: Henry Selick
- Based on: Coraline by Neil Gaiman
- Produced by: Bill Mechanic; Claire Jennings; Henry Selick; Mary Sandell
- Starring: Dakota Fanning; Teri Hatcher; Jennifer Saunders; Dawn French; Ian McShane
- Cinematography: Pete Kozachik
- Edited by: Christopher Murrie; Ronald Sanders
- Music by: Bruno Coulais
- Production companies: Laika; Pandemonium Films
- Distributed by: Focus Features (United States); Universal Pictures (international)
- Release dates: February 5, 2009 (Portland International Film Festival); February 6, 2009 (United States)
- Running time: 100 minutes
- Country: United States
- Language: English
- Budget: $60 million
- Box office: $188.3 million

Coraline is a 2009 American stop-motion animated Gothic dark fantasy black comedy horror film written, directed, and co-produced by Henry Selick and based on the 2002 novella by Neil Gaiman. The first feature-length film produced by Laika, it stars the voices of Dakota Fanning, Teri Hatcher, Jennifer Saunders, Dawn French, and Ian McShane. The film tells the story of a young girl named Coraline Jones (Fanning) who discovers an idealized alternate universe behind a secret door in her new home, unaware that it contains something dark and sinister.

As Gaiman was finishing his novella, he met Selick and invited him to make a film adaptation, as Gaiman was a fan of Selick's other stop-motion works. When Selick thought that a direct adaptation would lead to "maybe a 47-minute movie", the story was expanded. Looking for a design different from that of most animation, Selick discovered the work of Japanese illustrator Tadahiro Uesugi and invited him to become the concept artist. Uesugi's biggest influences were on the color palette, which was muted in the real world and more colorful in the alternate universe. Production of the animation took place at a warehouse in Hillsboro, Oregon.

Coraline premiered at the Portland International Film Festival on February 5, 2009, and was released theatrically in the United States on February 6 by Focus Features. The film was met with widespread acclaim from critics and grossed $126 million on its initial release. Several theatrical re-releases raised its box office total to $188 million, making it the third-highest-grossing stop-motion film of all time. The film was selected by the American Film Institute as one of the top ten films of 2009, won Annie Awards for Best Music, Best Character Design, and Best Production Design, and was nominated for Best Animated Feature at the Academy Awards and the Golden Globes.

== Plot ==
Eleven-year-old Coraline Jones and her parents, Charlie and Mel, move from Pontiac, Michigan, into the Pink Palace Apartments, an old Victorian house in Ashland, Oregon. While searching for an old well, she meets a black cat and the landlady's grandson, Wyborn "Wybie" Lovat, who gives her a doll that eerily resembles her. Since her parents are busy with work, Coraline entertains herself by exploring the house and discovers a small door with a brick wall behind it in the living room, which is unlocked with a button-shaped key.

That night, Coraline opens the door and finds that the brick wall has been replaced by a tunnel, which leads her to an "Other World", where button-eyed doppelgängers of her parents lavish her with delicious food and their attention. In the morning, Coraline awakens to find herself back in the real world, where Wybie recounts that his grandaunt disappeared when she was a child. Coraline meets her neighbors: Sergei Alexander Bobinsky, an eccentric Russian man who owns a mouse circus, and retired burlesque actresses April Spink and Miriam Forcible, who all warn her of impending danger.

Coraline continually returns to the Other World, where she meets the mute Other Wybie, as well as the Other Bobinsky and the Other Spink and Forcible. The cat, who can talk and travel between the worlds, further warns that Other World is a trap. The Other Mother offers Coraline the chance to stay in the Other World forever, on the condition she has buttons sewn into her eyes. Horrified, Coraline desperately tries to return home by sleeping, but she remains in the Other World.

After an argument, the Other Mother imprisons Coraline in a dark room behind a mirror. There, she meets three ghost children from previous time periods, one of whom is Wybie's grandaunt, who inform her that the Other Mother is an evil entity called the "Beldam", who used the doll to spy on their unhappy lives and lure them into the Other World. They allowed her to sew buttons over their eyes before she swallowed their lives. Coraline promises to help the ghost children by retrieving their "eyes", which are their souls, so they can escape the Other World. The Other Wybie frees her and helps her back through the passageway.

Back in the real world, Coraline finds her parents are missing. Wybie arrives and asks Coraline to return the doll, since it belonged to his grandaunt. She tries to explain the situation, but he does not believe her and runs away. Coraline receives an adder stone from Spink and Forcible and, teaming up with the cat, returns to the Other World. Coraline proposes a "game" to the Beldam: if she finds her parents and the eyes of the ghost children, the Beldam will let them all go; if not, she will stay and have buttons sewn over her eyes.

As Coraline finds each of the missing eyes using the adder stone, the Other World begins to fade until it disintegrates, except for the living room. The Beldam, now in her true arachnid-like form, challenges Coraline to find her parents. Coraline realizes they are trapped in a nearby snow globe, and the ghosts warn her that the Beldam will not honor her end of the deal. Coraline tricks the Beldam into unlocking the door before throwing the cat, who blinds her. She and the cat narrowly escape through the door with the ghost children's help, amputating one of the Beldam's hands in the process. Coraline's parents return with no memory of their imprisonment, and she warmly embraces them.

That night, the freed ghosts warn Coraline that the Beldam is still after the door's key. As Coraline heads toward the well to dispose of it, the Beldam's severed hand sneaks into the real world and attempts to drag her back to the Other World. Wybie, having realized Coraline was telling the truth, rescues her and vanquishes the hand before they both throw it and the key down the well.

The next day, the Jones family hosts a garden party for the Pink Palace residents. Wybie brings his grandmother to the party, and Coraline begins to tell her about her missing sister's fate.

== Voice cast ==
- Dakota Fanning as Coraline Jones
- Teri Hatcher as Melinda "Mel" Jones and The Beldam a.k.a. The Other Mother
- Jennifer Saunders as April Spink and her Other World counterpart
- Dawn French as Miriam Forcible and her Other World counterpart
- Keith David as The Cat
- John Hodgman as Charles "Charlie" Jones and The Other Father
  - John Linnell additionally provided the latter's singing voice
- Robert Bailey Jr. as Wyborne "Wybie" Lovat
- Ian McShane as Sergei Alexander Bobinsky and his Other World counterpart
- Aankha Neal, George Selick and Hannah Kaiser as The Ghost Children
- Harry Selick and Marina Budovsky as Coraline's friends back in Pontiac, Michigan
- Caroline Crawford as Mrs. Lovat, Wybie's Grandma

== Production ==
Coraline [was] a huge risk. But these days in animation, the safest bet is to take a risk.

— Henry Selick

Director Henry Selick met author Neil Gaiman just as Gaiman was finishing the novella Coraline, which was published in 2002, and as Gaiman was a fan of Selick's The Nightmare Before Christmas (1993), he invited him to make a film adaptation. As Selick thought a direct adaptation would lead to "maybe a 47-minute movie", his screenplay had some expansions, such as the creation of Wybie, who is only mentioned in the novel as the boy who lived in the house before Coraline. The character was expanded in order to not make it seem like Coraline was talking to herself all the time. When looking for a design different from that of most animation, Selick discovered the work of Japanese illustrator Tadahiro Uesugi and invited him to become the concept artist. One of Uesugi's biggest influences was on the color palette, which was muted in reality and more colorful in the Other World, as in The Wizard of Oz (1939). Uesugi said: "at the beginning, it was supposed to be a small project over a few weeks to simply create characters; however, I ended up working on the project for over a year, eventually designing sets and backgrounds, on top of drawing the basic images for the story to be built upon."

Coraline was staged in a 140,000-square-foot (13,000 m^{2}) warehouse in Hillsboro, Oregon. The stage was divided into 50 lots, which played host to nearly 150 sets. Among the sets were three miniature Victorian mansions, a 42-foot (12.8 m) apple orchard, and a model of Ashland, Oregon, including tiny details such as banners for the Oregon Shakespeare Festival. The Amazing Garden scene was the most complicated set created for the film. The hundreds of handmade flowers were created to grow and move accordingly when Coraline entered the garden. More than 28 animators worked at a time on rehearsing or shooting scenes, producing 90–100 seconds of finished animation each week. To capture stereoscopy for the 3D release, the animators shot each frame from two slightly apart camera positions.

Every object on the screen was made for the film. The crew used three 3D printing systems from Objet in the development and production of the film. Thousands of high-quality 3D models, ranging from facial expressions to doorknobs, were printed in 3D using the Polyjet matrix systems, which enable the fast transformation of computer-aided design (CAD) drawings into high-quality 3D models. The puppets had separate parts for the upper and lower parts of the head that could be exchanged for different facial expressions, and the characters could exhibit over 208,000 facial expressions. In the "Hidden Worlds: The Films of LAIKA" exhibit at Seattle's Museum of Pop Culture, the sign for "Replacing Faces" display said there were 207,336 possible face combinations for Coraline and 17,633 for her mother. Selick wanted to leave the seams in the characters' faces to show the handmade nature of the puppets, but Laika owner Phil Knight requested that the seams be removed digitally. There were 28 identical puppets of Coraline. Each one took 3–4 months to make and usually took 10 people to construct each one. Computer artists composited separately shot elements together or added their elements, which had to look handcrafted, not computer-generated; for instance, the flames were done with traditional animation and painted digitally, and the fog was dry ice.

At its peak, the film involved the efforts of 450 people, including 30 to 35 animators and digital designers in the Digital Design Group (DDG), directed by Dan Casey, and more than 250 technicians and designers. Principal photography took 18 months. One crew member, Althea Crome, was hired specifically to knit miniature sweaters and other clothing for the puppet characters, sometimes using knitting needles as thin as human hair. A single garment could take anywhere from six weeks to six months to complete. The clothes also simulated wear using paint and a file.

Coraline pays tribute to Joe and Jerome Ranft. The late Joe Ranft was a previous collaborator and a major inspiration to director Henry Selick. The Ranft Brothers are the models for the "Ranft Moving Inc." movers at the start of the film.

== Music ==
The soundtrack for Coraline features songs by Bruno Coulais, with one ("Other Father Song") by They Might Be Giants. The Other Father's singing voice is provided by John Linnell, one of the band's singers. The band was hired to compose an entire soundtrack for the film, but according to John Flansburgh, the production team "wanted the music to be more creepy", and only one song was ultimately used. Coulais's score was performed by the Budapest Symphony Orchestra and features choral pieces sung by the Children's Choir of Nice in a nonsense language. One of the choir members is coincidentally named Coraline. Coraline won Coulais the 2009 Annie Award for best score for an animated feature.

== Release ==
=== Home media ===
The film was released on DVD and Blu-ray in the United States on July 21, 2009, by Universal Studios Home Entertainment. A 3D version comes with four sets of 3D glasses—specifically the green-magenta anaglyph image. Coraline was released on DVD and Blu-ray in the United Kingdom on October 12, 2009. A 3D version of the film was also released on a two-disc Collector's Edition. The DVD opened to first-week sales of 1,036,845 and over $19 million in revenue. Total sales stand at over 2.6 million units and over $45 million in revenue. A two-disc Blu-ray 3D set, which includes a stereoscopic 3D on the first disc and an anaglyph 3D image, was released in 2011. A new edition from Shout! Factory under license from Universal was released on August 31, 2021. The film was released on 4K Ultra HD Blu-ray on December 13, 2022.

== Other media ==
The website for Coraline involves an interactive exploration game where the player can scroll through Coraline's world. It won the 2009 Webby Award for "Best Use of Animation or Motion Graphics", both by the people and the Webby organization. It was also nominated for the Webby "Movie and Film" category.

On June 16, 2008, D3 Publisher announced the release of a video game based on the film. It was developed by Papaya Studio for the Wii and PlayStation 2 and by Art Co. for Nintendo DS. It was released on January 27, 2009, close to the film's theatrical release. The soundtrack was released digitally February 3, 2009, by E1 Music, and in stores on February 24, 2009.

In November 2024, a Roblox game based on the film, Coraline: Evade the Others, was released on moblie platforms and PC, developed by Toya in honor of the film's 15th anniversity and its re-release, gaining over 18 million visits by January 2025.

== Reception ==
=== Box office ===
According to Paul Dergarabedian, a film business analyst with Media by Numbers, for the film to succeed it needed a box office comparable to Wallace & Gromit: The Curse of the Were-Rabbit, which had grossed $16 million its opening weekend and ended up grossing $125 million worldwide. Before the film's release, Dergarabedian thought Laika Studios "should be pleased" was Coraline to make $10 million in its opening weekend. In its US opening weekend, the film grossed $16.85 million, ranking third at the box office. It made $15 million during its second weekend, bringing its U.S. total up to $35.6 million, $25.5 million of which came from 3D presentations.

The film was re-released on August 14, 2023, grossing over $7 million over four days. For its 15th anniversary, it was re-released the following year in 3D on August 16, 2024, and made $12.5 million in four days, finishing fifth at the box office. By August 23, the 2024 re-release had grossed $29.2 million worldwide, making it the highest-grossing re-release in the history of Fathom Events. As of September 9, 2026, the re-release had grossed $52.4 million worldwide, bringing the film's lifetime total gross to $188.3 million worldwide. The 15th anniversary re-release became the second highest grossing re-release of a film of all time in the UK. It also earned more than its initial box gross from 2009 release in Mexico.

=== Critical response ===
On the review aggregator website Rotten Tomatoes, the film holds an approval rating of 91% based on 276 reviews, with an average rating of 8.0/10. The website's critics consensus reads, "With its vivid stop-motion animation combined with Neil Gaiman's imaginative story, Coraline is a film that's both visually stunning and wondrously entertaining." Metacritic, which uses a weighted average, assigned the film a score of 80 out of 100 based on reviews from 40 critics, indicating "generally favorable" reviews.

Roger Ebert of the Chicago Sun-Times gave the film three stars out of four, calling it "a beautiful film about several nasty people" as well as "nightmare fodder for children, however brave, under a certain age." David Edelstein of New York magazine said the film is "a bona fide fairy-tale" that needed a "touch less entrancement and a touch more ... story." A. O. Scott of The New York Times called the film "exquisitely realized", with a "slower pace and a more contemplative tone than the novel. It is certainly exciting, but rather than race through ever noisier set pieces toward a hectic climax in the manner of so much animation aimed at kids, Coraline lingers in an atmosphere that is creepy, wonderfully strange, and full of feeling."

In 2009, the American Film Institute named Coraline as part of their "Top 10 Movies of the Year" list. The film amassed a cult following. It has since been regarded as a groundbreaking work in stop-motion animation and as one of the greatest animated films of all time.

=== Accolades ===
Awards and nominations
Award	Category	Recipient(s)	Result
Academy Awards	Best Animated Feature	Henry Selick	Nominated
American Film Institute Awards	Best 10 Movies		Won
Annie Awards
Annie Awards	Best Animated Feature		Nominated
Annie Awards	Best Directing in an Animated Feature Production	Henry Selick	Nominated
Annie Awards	Best Voice Acting in an Animated Feature Production	Dawn French	Nominated
Annie Awards	Best Music in an Animated Feature Production	Bruno Coulais	Won
Annie Awards	Best Character Animation in an Animated Feature Production	Travis Knight	Nominated
Annie Awards	Best Character Design in an Animated Feature Production	Shane Prigmore; Shannon Tindle	Won
Annie Awards	Best Production Design in an Animated Feature Production	Christopher Appelhans; Tadahiro Uesugi	Won
Annie Awards	Best Storyboarding in an Animated Feature Production	Chris Butler	Nominated
Annecy International Animated Film Festival	Best Feature – Tied		Won
Broadcast Film Critics Association Awards	Best Animated Feature		Nominated
BAFTA Awards	Best Animated Film		Nominated
British Academy Children's Awards	Best Feature Film	Bill Mechanic, Henry Selick, Claire Jennings, Mary Sandell	Won
Chicago Film Critics Association Awards	Best Animated Feature		Nominated
Cinema Audio Society Awards
Cinema Audio Society Awards	Lifetime Achievement	Henry Selick	Won
Cinema Audio Society Awards	Career Achievement (sound designer/re-recording mixer)	Randy Thom	Won
EDA Alliance of Women Film Journalists Award
EDA Alliance of Women Film Journalists Award	Best Animated Female (the character of Coraline)		Won
EDA Alliance of Women Film Journalists Award	Best Animated Film		Nominated
Golden Globe Awards	Best Animated Feature Film		Nominated
Motion Picture Sound Editors Golden Reel Awards	Best Sound Editing: Sound Effects, Foley, Music, Dialogue and ADR Animation in a Feature Film		Nominated
Online Film Critics Society Awards	Best Animated Film		Nominated
People's Choice Awards	Best Animated 3D Movie of 2009		Nominated
Producers Guild of America Awards	Producer of the Year in Animated Motion Picture		Nominated
San Francisco Film Critics Circle Awards	Best Animated Feature		Won
St. Louis Film Critics Awards	Best Animated Film		Nominated
Visual Effects Society Awards
Visual Effects Society Awards	Outstanding Animation in an Animated Feature Motion Picture	Claire Jennings, Henry Selick	Nominated
Visual Effects Society Awards	Outstanding Animated Character in an Animated Feature Motion Picture	Coraline – Lead Animators Travis Knight and Trey Thomas	Nominated
Visual Effects Society Awards	Outstanding Effects Animation in an Animated Feature Motion Picture	John Allan Armstrong, Richard Kent Burton, Craig Dowsett	Nominated
Visual Effects Society Awards	Outstanding Models and Miniatures in a Feature Motion Picture	Deborah Cook, Matthew DeLeu, Paul Mack, Martin Meunier	Nominated
Washington D.C. Area Film Critics Association	Best Animated Film		Nominated

== See also ==
- List of ghost films
