= Moongirl =

2005 film by Henry Selick

- Directed by: Henry Selick
- Written by: Henry Selick
- Produced by: Helen Kalafatic
- Starring: Avrielle Corti; Zack Shada; Henry Selick
- Edited by: Christopher Murrie-Green
- Music by: They Might Be Giants
- Production company: Laika
- Release date: August 12, 2005
- Running time: 8 minutes
- Country: United States
- Language: English

Moongirl is an animated short produced in 2005 by Laika. It was written and directed by Henry Selick and features a score by They Might Be Giants. It is the first short film, and currently the only non-stop-motion film, produced by the company til ParaNorman: The Thrifting (2025).

== Premise ==
Leon, a youthful boy is out fishing at night when the Moon goes dark. He is magically transported to the Moon, where he meets Moongirl, whom he helps try to fix the Moon.

== Cast ==
- Avrielle Corti as Lorelei/Moongirl
- Zack Shada as Leon/Moonboy
- Henry Selick as Gargaloons

== Production ==
The film came about after Laika held a contest for a short film idea. CG modeler Michael Berger's idea of a girl who controls the Moon was chosen, and Selick was hired to develop the short. Selick brought on They Might Be Giants to do the score after connecting with them through Courtney Booker, who worked on the music video for "Bastard Wants to Hit Me".

In May 2004, Laika president Travis Knight's brother, Matthew, died suddenly, and the film was dedicated to his memory.

== Release ==
The film premiered at the Ottawa International Film Festival on September 24, 2005. The film was also shown with October 2005 screenings of Selick's previous work The Nightmare Before Christmas at El Capitan Theatre.

The film was adapted into a picture book which was written by Selick and illustrated by Peter Chan and Courtney Booker. The book, which was released on September 12, 2006, included a DVD copy of the film.

== Accolades ==
The film has won awards at multiple film festivals, including the Short Film Special Jury Prize at the Ottawa International Film Festival, the Grand Owl Award, Best Animation at the Fantasy Worldwide International Film Festival, Best Animated Short at the Los Angeles International Children's Film Festival, Best Animated Film at Memphis International Film Festival and Best Animated Film at San Fernando Valley International Film Festival.
